= Judo at the 2024 Summer Olympics – Qualification =

Judo competition

Qualification for judo at the Games of the XXXIII Olympiad
- Dates: 24 June 2022 (start); 23 June 2024 (end)

This article details the qualifying phase for judo at the 2024 Summer Olympics. The competition at these Games comprised a total of 372 athletes coming from their respective National Olympic Committees (NOCs); each could enter a maximum of fourteen judokas, seven each for both men and women, per bodyweight category. The host country France received a spot in all fourteen individual events, while fifteen places were reserved for the eligible NOCs through universality quotas awarded by the Tripartite Commission.

The remaining judokas were required to undergo a qualifying process to secure a spot in their respective weight category for the Games through the world ranking list prepared by the International Judo Federation (IJF). The qualification window had commenced on 24 June 2022, and concluded two years later (23 June 2024), with the final eligibility list published two days after the deadline.

The top 17 judokas in each bodyweight category from the world ranking list qualified directly for the Games, with each NOC subjected to a limit of one judoka per division. If an NOC had more than one judoka ranked among the top 17 in a weight class, it was for the NOC to decide which athlete obtained the quota place.

Further continental quotas (13 men and 12 women for Europe, 12 of each gender for Africa, ten men and 11 women for the Americas, ten of each gender for Asia, and five of each gender for Oceania) were also available. The International Judo Federation publishes a list of all judokas for each continent across all gender-based bodyweight categories to assign these quota places according to their world ranking points. Eligible judokas with the highest number of points on the ranking list will secure a continental quota for their respective NOC at the Games regardless of their gender and weight category. Each NOC may only enter a single judoka through the continental qualification rules.

The mixed-team tournament will offer five invitational places (one for each continent) to the highest-ranked NOCs that have qualified judokas in only five of the six mixed-team weight classes. Among these NOCs, the highest-ranked judoka vying for qualification will fill the remaining quota place to complete the team.

The International Olympic Committee also invited 6 (3 men and 3 women) athletes to participate for Refugee Olympic Team. These athletes will also participate in the mixed-team tournament.

== Timeline ==
Date	Milestone
24 June 2022	Start of qualification period.
23 June 2024	End of qualification period.
25 June 2024	Publication of IJF World Ranking List of the Olympic Qualification period.
25 June 2024	IJF confirms in writing to the NOCs the quota places obtained.
25 June 2024	The Tripartite Commission to confirm in writing the allocation of Universality Places to the NOCs
2 July 2024	The NOCs to confirm to the IJF the use of the allocated quota places.
3 July 2024	IJF to reallocate all unused quota places
6 July 2024	The NOCs to confirm to the IJF the use of the reallocated quota places.
8 July 2024	Paris 2024 Sport Entries deadline.

== Qualification summary ==
NOC	Men							Women							Mixed	Total	Ref.	
NOC	60 kg	66 kg	73 kg	81 kg	90 kg	100 kg	+100 kg	48 kg	52 kg	57 kg	63 kg	70 kg	78 kg	+78 kg	Team	Total	Ref.	
NOC	Algeria			Yes				Yes				Yes					Ref.	3
Angola		Yes														1		
Argentina									Yes							1		
Australia	Yes										Yes	Yes				3		
Austria			Yes	Yes		Yes		Yes			Yes	Yes			Yes	6		
Azerbaijan	Yes	Yes	Yes	Yes	Yes	Yes	Yes	Yes	Yes							9		
Bahrain				Yes												1		
Belgium	Yes			Yes		Yes						Yes				4		
Benin				Yes												1		
Bosnia and Herzegovina												Yes		Yes		2		
Brazil	Yes	Yes	Yes	Yes	Yes	Yes	Yes	Yes	Yes	Yes	Yes		Yes	Yes	Yes	13		
Bulgaria			Yes		Yes											2		
Burundi													Yes			1		
Cape Verde									Yes							1		
Cameroon														Yes		1		
Canada			Yes	Yes		Yes			Yes	Yes	Yes			Yes	Yes	7		
Central African Republic											Yes					1		
Chile						Yes		Yes								2		
China								Yes	Yes	Yes	Yes		Yes	Yes		6		
Chinese Taipei	Yes							Yes		Yes						3		
Colombia								Yes								1		
Costa Rica	Yes															1		
Croatia						Yes					Yes	Yes				3		
Cuba					Yes		Yes				Yes			Yes		4		
Cyprus									Yes							1		
Czech Republic					Yes		Yes				Yes					3		
Democratic Republic of the Congo	Yes															1		
Denmark												Yes				1		
Djibouti			Yes													1		
Dominican Republic					Yes											1		
Ecuador													Yes			1		
Egypt	Yes			Yes												2		
El Salvador	Yes															1		
Estonia					Yes											1		
Fiji							Yes									1		
Finland		Yes					Yes									2		
France	Yes	Yes	Yes	Yes	Yes	Yes	Yes	Yes	Yes	Yes	Yes	Yes	Yes	Yes	Yes	14		
Gabon								Yes								1		
The Gambia			Yes													1		
Georgia	Yes	Yes	Yes	Yes	Yes	Yes	Yes			Yes	Yes			Yes	Yes	10		
Germany			Yes	Yes	Yes		Yes	Yes	Yes	Yes		Yes	Yes	Yes	Yes	10		
Great Britain									Yes	Yes	Yes	Yes	Yes			5		
Greece					Yes							Yes				2		
Guam										Yes						1		
Guatemala								Yes								1		
Guinea										Yes			Yes			2		
Guinea-Bissau							Yes									1		
Haiti			Yes													1		
Hong Kong								Yes								1		
Hungary		Yes		Yes	Yes	Yes			Yes		Yes	Yes			Yes	7		
India														Yes		1		
Individual Neutral Athletes				Yes												1		
Indonesia									Yes							1		
Israel	Yes	Yes	Yes	Yes		Yes		Yes	Yes	Yes	Yes	Yes	Yes	Yes	Yes	12		
Italy	Yes	Yes	Yes	Yes	Yes	Yes		Yes	Yes	Yes	Yes	Yes	Yes	Yes	Yes	13		
Ivory Coast										Yes						1		
Jamaica	Yes															1		
Japan	Yes	Yes	Yes	Yes	Yes	Yes	Yes	Yes	Yes	Yes	Yes	Yes	Yes	Yes	Yes	14		
Kazakhstan	Yes	Yes	Yes	Yes		Yes		Yes			Yes			Yes	Yes	8		
Kenya													Yes			1		
Kiribati										Yes						1		
Kosovo			Yes						Yes	Yes	Yes		Yes			5		
Kyrgyzstan		Yes			Yes											2		
Lebanon					Yes											1		
Madagascar												Yes				1		
Mauritius					Yes											1		
Mexico									Yes		Yes					2		
Moldova		Yes	Yes	Yes												3		
Mongolia	Yes	Yes	Yes			Yes	Yes	Yes	Yes	Yes			Yes	Yes	Yes	10		
Morocco		Yes							Yes							2		
Mozambique									Yes							1		
Nepal										Yes						1		
Netherlands	Yes			Yes	Yes	Yes	Yes			Yes	Yes	Yes	Yes	Yes	Yes	10		
New Zealand													Yes	Yes		2		
North Korea												Yes				1		
Panama										Yes						1		
Paraguay								Yes								1		
Peru		Yes														1		
Philippines											Yes					1		
Poland			Yes			Yes					Yes		Yes			4		
Portugal				Yes		Yes		Yes			Yes	Yes	Yes	Yes		7		
Puerto Rico				Yes								Yes				2		
Romania					Yes											1		
Samoa			Yes													1		
Senegal							Yes									1		
Serbia		Yes			Yes	Yes		Yes		Yes				Yes	Yes	6		
Slovakia							Yes									1		
Slovenia							Yes	Yes		Yes	Yes	Yes	Yes			6		
South Africa								Yes								1		
South Korea	Yes	Yes		Yes	Yes		Yes	Yes	Yes	Yes	Yes		Yes	Yes	Yes	11		
Spain	Yes	Yes	Yes		Yes	Yes		Yes	Yes		Yes	Yes			Yes	9		
Sweden					Yes			Yes								2		
Switzerland			Yes			Yes			Yes							3		
Tajikistan		Yes	Yes	Yes	Yes	Yes	Yes									6		
Thailand			Yes													1		
Tunisia								Yes						Yes		2		
Turkey	Yes	Yes		Yes	Yes		Yes	Yes				Yes		Yes	Yes	8		
Turkmenistan		Yes								Yes						2		
Ukraine	Yes	Yes								Yes			Yes	Yes		5		
United Arab Emirates		Yes		Yes	Yes	Yes	Yes		Yes							6		
United States			Yes		Yes			Yes	Yes							4		
Uruguay				Yes												1		
Uzbekistan	Yes	Yes	Yes	Yes	Yes	Yes	Yes	Yes	Yes	Yes		Yes	Yes		Yes	12		
Vanuatu				Yes												1		
Venezuela											Yes					1		
Vietnam								Yes								1		
Zambia	Yes															1		
Total: 107	24	25	27	28	28	24	22	30	26	26	28	23	22	23	18	356		
References																		

== Men's events ==
=== Extra-lightweight (60 kg) ===
Provisional list. Updated to 13 July 2024.
Bold — secured qualification.

Qualification method	Places	Rank	NOC	Qualified judoka	Ranking points	Qualified* (not highest ranked in NOC)
Host nation	1	—	France	**Luka Mkheidze** (Note: Internally selected by NOC.)	5228	Romain Valadier-Picard (4093); Cédric Revol (3545); Maxime Merlin (1110); Richard Vergnes (638); Theo Raoul Hebrard (510); Romaric Wend-Yam Bouda (483); Enzo Jean (398)
IJF World Ranking List	17	1	Chinese Taipei	Yang Yung-wei	6510	
IJF World Ranking List	17	2	Georgia	**Giorgi Sardalashvili**	5674	
IJF World Ranking List	17	3	South Korea	Lee Ha-rim	5206	**Kim Won-jin** (2862)
IJF World Ranking List	17	4	Spain	**Francisco Garrigós**	5119	
IJF World Ranking List	17	5	Japan	**Ryuju Nagayama**	4950	Naohisa Takato (2960); Taiki Nakamura (2550)
IJF World Ranking List	17	6	Azerbaijan	**Balabay Aghayev**	4720	Turan Bayramov (3333)
IJF World Ranking List	17	8	Turkey	Salih Yıldız	3712	
IJF World Ranking List	17	9	Ukraine	Dilshot Khalmatov	3639	
IJF World Ranking List	17	10	Mongolia	Enkhtaivany Ariunbold	3494	
IJF World Ranking List	17	11	Uzbekistan	Dilshodbek Baratov	3424	Doston Ruziev (3216)
IJF World Ranking List	17	12	Kazakhstan	Nurkanat Serikbayev	3401	**Yeldos Smetov** (2914); Magzhan Shamshadin (2844)
IJF World Ranking List	17	13	Belgium	Jorre Verstraeten	2972	
IJF World Ranking List	17	14	Netherlands	**Tornike Tsjakadoea**	2922	
IJF World Ranking List	17	15	Brazil	**Michel Augusto**	2796	
IJF World Ranking List	17	16	Israel	Yam Wolczak	2521	
IJF World Ranking List	17	17	Egypt	Youssry Samy	2382	
Continental quota	Africa		Zambia	Simon Zulu	1130	
Continental quota	Africa		Democratic Republic of the Congo	Arnold Kisoka	705	
Continental quota	Oceania		Australia	Josh Katz	1630	
Continental quota	America		Jamaica	Ashley McKenzie	939	
Continental quota	America		El Salvador	Jairo Moreno	519	
Continental quota	America		Costa Rica	Sebastián Sancho	431	
Returned direct quota			Italy	Andrea Carlino	1863	

=== Half-lightweight (66 kg) ===
Provisional list. Updated to 13 July 2024.
Bold — secured qualification.

Qualification method	Places	Rank	NOC	Qualified judoka	Ranking points	Qualified* (not highest ranked in NOC)
Host nation	1	—	France	**Walide Khyar**	3348	Daikii Bouba (2988); Maxime Gobert (1800); Reda Seddouki (647); Romaric Wend-Yam Bouda (276); Orlando Cazorla (248)
IJF World Ranking List	17	1	Moldova	Denis Vieru	4860	
IJF World Ranking List	17	2	Georgia	**Vazha Margvelashvili**	4850	
IJF World Ranking List	17	3	Mongolia	Battogtokhyn Erkhembayar	4768	Yondonperenlein Baskhüü (4706)
IJF World Ranking List	17	4	Japan	Ryoma Tanaka	4760	**Hifumi Abe** (4500); Takeshi Takeoka (3100); Joshiro Maruyama (2600)
IJF World Ranking List	17	5	Tajikistan	Nurali Emomali	4463	Obid Dzhebov (3283)
IJF World Ranking List	17	6	Brazil	**Willian Lima**	4280	
IJF World Ranking List	17	7	Spain	**David García Torné**	4088	Alberto Gaitero Martin (3301)
IJF World Ranking List	17	8	Italy	**Matteo Piras**	3899	Elios Manzi (2922)
IJF World Ranking List	17	9	Azerbaijan	**Yashar Najafov**	3842	
IJF World Ranking List	17	10	Uzbekistan	Sardor Nurillaev	3634	Mukhriddin Tilovov (3316)
IJF World Ranking List	17	11	South Korea	**An Ba-ul**	3442	
IJF World Ranking List	17	12	United Arab Emirates	Bayanmönkhiin Narmandakh	3375	
IJF World Ranking List	17	13	Ukraine	Bogdan Iadov	3366	
IJF World Ranking List	17	14	Finland	Luukas Saha	2889	
IJF World Ranking List	17	15	Israel	Baruch Shmailov	2827	
IJF World Ranking List	17	16	Kazakhstan	**Gusman Kyrgyzbayev**	2562	
Continental quota	Africa		Morocco	Abderrahmane Boushita	2456	
Continental quota	Africa		Angola	Edmilson Pedro	991	
Continental quota	Asia		Turkmenistan	Serdar Rahymow	2324	
Continental quota	Asia		Kyrgyzstan	Kubanychbek Aibek Uulu	2049	
Continental quota	Europe		Serbia	**Strahinja Bunčić**	2300	
Continental quota	America		Peru	Juan Postigos	1259	
Returned team invitation			Hungary	Bence Pongrácz	1157	
Returned direct quota			Turkey	Muhammed Demirel	2177	

=== Lightweight (73 kg) ===
Provisional list. Updated to 13 July 2024.
Bold — secured qualification.

Qualification method	Places	Rank	NOC	Qualified judoka	Ranking points	Qualified* (not highest ranked in NOC)
Host nation	1	—	France	**Joan-Benjamin Gaba**	1710	Benjamin Axus (1642); Orlando Cazorla (869); Luca Otmane (341); Eliot Preve (302); Hans-Jorris Ahibo (166)
IJF World Ranking List	17	1	Azerbaijan	**Hidayat Heydarov**	8798	
IJF World Ranking List	17	2	Japan	**Soichi Hashimoto**	5190	Tatsuki Ishihara (3100)
IJF World Ranking List	17	3	Switzerland	Nils Stump	5098	
IJF World Ranking List	17	4	Italy	**Manuel Lombardo**	4850	
IJF World Ranking List	17	5	Uzbekistan	Shakhram Ahadov	4748	Murodjon Yuldoshev (4478); Obidkhon Nomonov (2846)
IJF World Ranking List	17	6	Brazil	**Daniel Cargnin**	4585	
IJF World Ranking List	17	7	Georgia	**Lasha Shavdatuashvili**	4402	
IJF World Ranking List	17	8	Canada	Arthur Margelidon	4050	
IJF World Ranking List	17	10	Tajikistan	Behruzi Khojazoda	3945	
IJF World Ranking List	17	11	Moldova	Adil Osmanov	3595	Petru Pelivan (3181)
IJF World Ranking List	17	12	Algeria	Messaoud Dris	3420	
IJF World Ranking List	17	13	Spain	**Salvador Cases**	3300	
IJF World Ranking List	17	14	Kosovo	Akil Gjakova	3154	
IJF World Ranking List	17	15	Kazakhstan	**Daniyar Shamshayev**	2928	
IJF World Ranking List	17	16	United States	**Jack Yonezuka**	2900	
IJF World Ranking List	17	17	Israel	Tohar Butbul	2812	
Continental quota	Africa		The Gambia	Faye Njie	1261	
Continental quota	Africa		Djibouti	Aden-Alexandre Houssein	725	
Continental quota	Asia		Mongolia	Batzayaagiin Erdenebayar	2550	
Continental quota	Asia		Thailand	Masayuki Terada	968	
Continental quota	Europe		Bulgaria	Mark Hristov	2338	
Continental quota	Oceania		Samoa	William Tai Tin	136	
Continental quota	America		Haiti	Philippe Metellus	207	
Returned team invitation			Austria	**Samuel Gassner**	712	
Returned quota			Germany	**Igor Wandtke**	2702	
Returned direct quota			Poland	Adam Stodolski	2008	

=== Half-middleweight (81 kg) ===
Provisional list. Updated to 13 July 2024.
Bold — secured qualification.

Qualification method	Places	Rank	NOC	Qualified judoka	Ranking points	Qualified* (not highest ranked in NOC)
Host nation	1	—	France	**Alpha Oumar Djalo**	2356	Arnaud Aregba (1001); Tizie Gnamien (591); Ibrahim Keita (527); Daniyl Zoubko (421); Loïc Pietri (154)
IJF World Ranking List	17	1	Belgium	Matthias Casse	7932	
IJF World Ranking List	17	2	Georgia	**Tato Grigalashvili**	7665	
IJF World Ranking List	17	3	South Korea	**Lee Joon-hwan**	5980	
IJF World Ranking List	17	4	Brazil	**Guilherme Schimidt**	5056	
IJF World Ranking List	17	5	Canada	François Gauthier-Drapeau	4560	
IJF World Ranking List	17	6	Azerbaijan	Zelim Tckaev	4321	Saeid Mollaei (3563)
IJF World Ranking List	17	7	Tajikistan	Somon Makhmadbekov	4240	
IJF World Ranking List	17	8	Japan	**Takanori Nagase**	4160	
IJF World Ranking List	17	9	Kazakhstan	**Abylaikhan Zhubanazar**	3718	
IJF World Ranking List	17	10	Turkey	Vedat Albayrak	3662	
IJF World Ranking List	17	11	Uzbekistan	Sharofiddin Boltaboev	3656	
IJF World Ranking List	17	12	Italy	**Antonio Esposito**	3594	
IJF World Ranking List	17	14	Netherlands	**Frank de Wit**	3517	
IJF World Ranking List	17	15	United Arab Emirates	Nugzar Tatalashvili	3268	
IJF World Ranking List	17	16	Israel	Sagi Muki	3248	
IJF World Ranking List	17	17	Austria	**Wachid Borchashvili**	3240	
Continental quota	Africa		Egypt	Abdelrahman Abdelghany	1647	
Continental quota	Africa		Benin	Valentin Houinato	504	
Continental quota	Asia		Bahrain	Askerbii Gerbekov	2428	
Continental quota	Europe		Hungary	Attila Ungvári	3186	
Continental quota	Europe		Germany	**Timo Cavelius**	2938	
Continental quota	Europe		Portugal	**João Fernando**	2501	
Continental quota	Europe		Moldova	Mihail Latișev	2311	
Continental quota	Oceania		Vanuatu	Hugo Cumbo	57	
Continental quota	America		Puerto Rico	Adrián Gandía	1738	
Continental quota	America		Uruguay	Alain Mikael Aprahamian	731	

=== Middleweight (90 kg) ===
Provisional list. Updated to 13 July 2024.
Bold — secured qualification.

Qualification method	Places	Rank	NOC	Qualified judoka	Ranking points	Qualified* (not highest ranked in NOC)
Host nation	1	—	France	Alexis Mathieu	3574	**Maxime-Gaël Ngayap Hambou** (1870); Axel Clerget (1587); Loris Tassier (764); Paul Livolsi (593); Max Laborde (590); Francis Damier (202); Aleksa Mitrovic (175); Teo L Herbier (156)
IJF World Ranking List	17	1	Georgia	**Lasha Bekauri**	5740	
IJF World Ranking List	17	2	Serbia	**Nemanja Majdov**	5402	
IJF World Ranking List	17	3	Japan	**Sanshiro Murao**	5210	
IJF World Ranking List	17	4	Kyrgyzstan	Erlan Sherov	4818	
IJF World Ranking List	17	5	Hungary	Krisztián Tóth	4795	
IJF World Ranking List	17	6	Uzbekistan	Davlat Bobonov	4714	
IJF World Ranking List	17	7	Turkey	Mihael Žgank	4480	
IJF World Ranking List	17	8	Italy	**Christian Parlati**	4472	
IJF World Ranking List	17	9	Cuba	Iván Felipe Silva Morales	4260	
IJF World Ranking List	17	10	Brazil	**Rafael Macedo**	3863	
IJF World Ranking List	17	11	Azerbaijan	Murad Fatiyev	3822	Eljan Hajiyev (3448)
IJF World Ranking List	17	12	Bulgaria	Ivaylo Ivanov	3800	
IJF World Ranking List	17	13	Spain	**Tristani Mosakhlishvili**	3722	
IJF World Ranking List	17	14	Greece	Theodoros Tselidis	3578	
IJF World Ranking List	17	16	Netherlands	**Noël van 't End**	3124	
IJF World Ranking List	17	17	Tajikistan	Komronshokh Ustopiriyon	2746	
Continental quota	Africa		Mauritius	Rémi Feuillet	1294	
Continental quota	Asia		South Korea	**Han Ju-yeop**	2537	
Continental quota	Asia		Lebanon	Caramnob Sagaipov	2132	
Continental quota	Asia		United Arab Emirates	Aram Grigorian	1968	
Continental quota	Europe		Czech Republic	David Klammert	2650	
Continental quota	Europe		Estonia	Klen-Kristofer Kaljulaid	2472	
Continental quota	Europe		Sweden	**Marcus Nyman**	2378	
Continental quota	Europe		Romania	Alex Creţ	2324	
Continental quota	America		Dominican Republic	Robert Florentino	2274	
Continental quota	America		United States	**John Jayne**	2124	
Returned direct quota			Germany	Eduard Trippel	2274	

=== Half-heavyweight (100 kg) ===
Provisional list. Updated to 13 July 2024.
Bold — secured qualification.

Qualification method	Places	Rank	NOC	Qualified judoka	Ranking points	Qualified* (not highest ranked in NOC)
Host nation	1	—	France	**Aurélien Diesse**	1050	Alexandre Iddir (790); Kenny Liveze (675); Francis Damier (582); Marc Francois Ngayap (551); Cédric Olivar (388)
IJF World Ranking List	17	1	Azerbaijan	**Zelym Kotsoiev**	7022	
IJF World Ranking List	17	2	Georgia	**Ilia Sulamanidze**	6350	
IJF World Ranking List	17	3	Canada	Shady Elnahas	6288	Kyle Reyes (5002)
IJF World Ranking List	17	4	Uzbekistan	Muzaffarbek Turoboyev	5749	
IJF World Ranking List	17	6	Netherlands	**Michael Korrel**	4802	
IJF World Ranking List	17	7	Spain	**Nikoloz Sherazadishvili**	4730	
IJF World Ranking List	17	8	Portugal	**Jorge Fonseca**	4260	
IJF World Ranking List	17	9	Mongolia	Batkhuyagiin Gonchigsüren	4245	
IJF World Ranking List	17	10	Israel	Peter Paltchik	4142	
IJF World Ranking List	17	11	Brazil	**Leonardo Gonçalves**	4070	Rafael Buzacarini (3032)
IJF World Ranking List	17	12	Japan	**Aaron Wolf**	3900	Dota Arai (3305)
IJF World Ranking List	17	13	Switzerland	Daniel Eich	3865	
IJF World Ranking List	17	14	Serbia	**Aleksandar Kukolj**	3682	
IJF World Ranking List	17	15	Italy	**Gennaro Pirelli**	3474	
IJF World Ranking List	17	16	United Arab Emirates	Dzhafar Kostoev	3434	
IJF World Ranking List	17	17	Austria	**Aaron Fara**	2956	
Continental quota	Asia		Kazakhstan	**Nurlykhan Sharkhan**	2722	
Continental quota	Europe		Belgium	Toma Nikiforov	2904	
Continental quota	Europe		Croatia	Zlatko Kumrić	2637	
Continental quota	Europe		Poland	Piotr Kuczera	2467	
Continental quota	America		Chile	Thomas Briceño	1170	
Returned direct quota			Hungary	Zsombor Vég	2607	
Returned continental quota			Tajikistan	Dzhakhongir Madzhidov	1850	

=== Heavyweight (+100 kg) ===
Provisional list. Updated to 13 July 2024.
Bold — secured qualification.

Qualification method	Places	Rank	NOC	Qualified judoka	Ranking points	Qualified* (not highest ranked in NOC)
Host nation	1	—	France	**Teddy Riner**	5200	Amadou Meité (716); Emre Sanal (330); Joseph Terhec (290); Tieman Diaby (260); Khamzat Saparbaev (192)
IJF World Ranking List	17	1	South Korea	**Kim Min-jong**	6405	
IJF World Ranking List	17	3	Tajikistan	Temur Rakhimov	6220	
IJF World Ranking List	17	4	Georgia	**Guram Tushishvili**	5748	
IJF World Ranking List	17	5	Cuba	Andy Granda	5554	
IJF World Ranking List	17	6	Japan	**Tatsuru Saito**	5270	Hyōga Ōta (3722)
IJF World Ranking List	17	7	Uzbekistan	Alisher Yusupov	4530	
IJF World Ranking List	17	8	Finland	Martti Puumalainen	4294	
IJF World Ranking List	17	9	Czech Republic	Lukáš Krpálek	4067	
IJF World Ranking List	17	10	Netherlands	**Jelle Snippe**	3501	Jur Spijkers (3134)
IJF World Ranking List	17	11	Brazil	**Rafael Silva**	3415	
IJF World Ranking List	17	12	United Arab Emirates	Magomedomar Magomedomarov	3375	
IJF World Ranking List	17	13	Slovakia	Márius Fízeľ	3313	
IJF World Ranking List	17	14	Azerbaijan	**Ushangi Kokauri**	3209	
IJF World Ranking List	17	15	Germany	Erik Abramov	3146	Losseni Kone (3067)
IJF World Ranking List	17	16	Mongolia	Odkhüügiin Tsetsentsengel	3144	
IJF World Ranking List	17	17	Turkey	İbrahim Tataroğlu	2522	
Continental quota	Africa		Senegal	Mbagnick Ndiaye	2176	
Continental quota	Africa		Algeria	Mohamed El Mehdi Lili	1530	
Continental quota	Africa		Guinea-Bissau	Bubacar Mane	875	
Continental quota	Oceania		Fiji	Gerard Takayawa	162	
Returned direct quota			Slovenia	Enej Marinič	2153	

== Women's events ==
=== Extra-lightweight (48 kg) ===
Provisional list. Updated to 13 July 2024.
Bold — secured qualification.

Qualification method	Places	Rank	NOC	Qualified judoka	Ranking points	Qualified* (not highest ranked in NOC)
Host nation	1	—	France	**Shirine Boukli**	5010	Blandine Pont (3435); Laura Espadinha (1144); Mélanie Vieu (779); Anais Perrot (713); Manon Urdiales (261); Marine Gilly (217); Pauline Cuq (188); Melanie Legoux Clement (180)
IJF World Ranking List	17	1	Italy	**Assunta Scutto**	7335	
IJF World Ranking List	17	2	Mongolia	Bavuudorjiin Baasankhüü	6502	Ganbaataryn Narantsetseg (3542)
IJF World Ranking List	17	3	Kazakhstan	**Abiba Abuzhakynova**	5576	Galiya Tynbayeva (3533)
IJF World Ranking List	17	4	Japan	**Natsumi Tsunoda**	5200	Wakana Koga (4300)
IJF World Ranking List	17	5	Serbia	**Milica Nikolić**	4678	
IJF World Ranking List	17	6	Portugal	**Catarina Costa**	4634	
IJF World Ranking List	17	8	South Korea	**Lee Hye-kyeong**	3970	
IJF World Ranking List	17	9	United States	**Maria Celia Laborde**	3956	
IJF World Ranking List	17	10	Turkey	Tuğçe Beder	3923	
IJF World Ranking List	17	11	Spain	**Laura Martínez**	3668	Mireia Lapuerta Comas (3389); Julia Figueroa (2905)
IJF World Ranking List	17	12	Sweden	**Tara Babulfath**	3324	
IJF World Ranking List	17	13	Slovenia	Maruša Štangar	3156	
IJF World Ranking List	17	14	China	Guo Zongying	3030	
IJF World Ranking List	17	15	Chile	Mary Dee Vargas	2980	
IJF World Ranking List	17	16	Azerbaijan	**Leyla Aliyeva**	2914	
IJF World Ranking List	17	17	Israel	Shira Rishony	2766	
Continental quota	Africa		South Africa	Geronay Whitebooi	1712	
Continental quota	Africa		Gabon	Virginia Aymard	1108	
Continental quota	Asia		Uzbekistan	Khalimajon Kurbonova	2652	
Continental quota	Asia		Chinese Taipei	Lin Chen-hao	1996	
Continental quota	Asia		Hong Kong	Wong Ka Lee	743	
Continental quota	Asia		Vietnam	Hoàng Thị Tình	313	
Continental quota	Europe		Austria	**Katharina Tanzer**	1643	
Continental quota	America		Colombia	Erika Lasso	1955	
Continental quota	America		Paraguay	Gabriela Narváez	707	
Continental quota	America		Guatemala	Jacqueline Solís	619	
Returned quota			Germany	Katharina Menz	2722	
Returned quota			Brazil	Natasha Ferreira	2694	
Returned direct quota			Tunisia	Oumaima Bedioui	1760	

=== Half-lightweight (52 kg) ===
Provisional list. Updated to 13 July 2024.
Bold — secured qualification.

Qualification method	Places	Rank	NOC	Qualified judoka	Ranking points	Qualified* (not highest ranked in NOC)
Host nation	1	—	France	**Amandine Buchard**	7184	Astride Gneto (2652); Léa Métrot (652); Leonie Gonzalez (633); Julie Weill dit Morey (476); Chloé Devictor (385); Léa Beres (350); Alyssia Poulange (268)
IJF World Ranking List	17	1	Uzbekistan	Diyora Keldiyorova	8100	Sita Kadamboeva (2540)
IJF World Ranking List	17	2	Kosovo	Distria Krasniqi	7260	
IJF World Ranking List	17	3	Italy	**Odette Giuffrida**	7252	
IJF World Ranking List	17	4	Great Britain	Chelsie Giles	5788	
IJF World Ranking List	17	5	Hungary	Réka Pupp	5380	
IJF World Ranking List	17	6	Israel	Gefen Primo	5374	
IJF World Ranking List	17	7	Germany	**Mascha Ballhaus**	4982	
IJF World Ranking List	17	8	Japan	**Uta Abe**	4850	
IJF World Ranking List	17	9	Brazil	**Larissa Pimenta**	4802	
IJF World Ranking List	17	10	United Arab Emirates	Bishreltiin Khorloodoi	3759	
IJF World Ranking List	17	11	Spain	**Ariane Toro**	3672	
IJF World Ranking List	17	12	Mongolia	Lkhagvasürengiin Sosorbaram	3265	
IJF World Ranking List	17	13	China	Zhu Yeqing	3229	
IJF World Ranking List	17	14	Morocco	Soumiya Iraoui	3164	
IJF World Ranking List	17	15	Switzerland	Binta Ndiaye	3089	Fabienne Kocher (2974)
IJF World Ranking List	17	16	United States	**Angelica Delgado**	2621	
IJF World Ranking List	17	17	South Korea	**Jung Ye-rin**	2533	
Continental quota	Africa		Cape Verde	Djamila Silva	1190	
Continental quota	Africa		Mozambique	Jacira Ferreira	481	
Continental quota	Asia		Indonesia	Maryam March Maharani	827	
Continental quota	Europe		Azerbaijan	**Gultaj Mammadaliyeva**	2446	
Continental quota	Europe		Cyprus	Sofia Asvesta	2052	
Continental quota	America		Mexico	Paulina Martínez	1872	
Continental quota	America		Canada	Kelly Deguchi	1762	
Continental quota	America		Argentina	Sofía Fiora	1453	

=== Lightweight (57 kg) ===
Provisional list. Updated to 13 July 2024.
Bold — secured qualification.

Qualification method	Places	Rank	NOC	Qualified judoka	Ranking points	Qualified* (not highest ranked in NOC)
Host nation	1	—	France	**Sarah-Léonie Cysique**	5120	Priscilla Gneto (3195); Faïza Mokdar (1712); Ophélie Vellozzi (866); Martha Fawaz (594); Chloé Devictor (422); Lou Lemire (287)
IJF World Ranking List	17	1	Canada	Christa Deguchi	9690	Jessica Klimkait (8650)
IJF World Ranking List	17	2	South Korea	**Huh Mi-mi**	6590	
IJF World Ranking List	17	3	Brazil	**Rafaela Silva**	5279	Jéssica Lima (3692)
IJF World Ranking List	17	4	Japan	**Haruka Funakubo**	4750	
IJF World Ranking List	17	5	Georgia	**Eteri Liparteliani**	4645	
IJF World Ranking List	17	6	Kosovo	Nora Gjakova	4432	
IJF World Ranking List	17	7	Serbia	**Marica Perišić**	4340	
IJF World Ranking List	17	8	Israel	Timna Nelson-Levy	3854	
IJF World Ranking List	17	9	Italy	**Veronica Toniolo**	3662	
IJF World Ranking List	17	10	Mongolia	Lkhagvatogoogiin Enkhriilen	3650	
IJF World Ranking List	17	11	Ukraine	Daria Bilodid	3445	
IJF World Ranking List	17	12	Germany	**Pauline Starke**	3366	Seija Ballhaus (2859)
IJF World Ranking List	17	13	Slovenia	Kaja Kajzer	2954	
IJF World Ranking List	17	14	Turkmenistan	Maýsa Pardaýewa	2827	
IJF World Ranking List	17	16	Chinese Taipei	Lien Chen-ling	2694	
IJF World Ranking List	17	17	China	Cai Qi	2507	
Continental quota	Africa		Guinea	Mariana Esteves	2468	
Continental quota	Africa		Ivory Coast	Zouleiha Dabonne	1390	
Continental quota	Asia		Nepal	Manita Shrestha Pradhan	208	
Continental quota	Europe		Great Britain	Lele Nairne	2320	
Continental quota	Europe		Netherlands	Julie Beurskens	2104	
Continental quota	Oceania		Guam	Maria Escano	239	
Continental quota	Oceania		Kiribati	Nera Tiebwa	10	
Continental quota	America		Panama	Kristine Jiménez	1171	
Returned direct quota			Uzbekistan	Shukurjon Aminova	2474	

=== Half-middleweight (63 kg) ===
Provisional list. Updated to 13 July 2024.
Bold — secured qualification.

Qualification method	Places	Rank	NOC	Qualified judoka	Ranking points	Qualified* (not highest ranked in NOC)
Host nation	1	—	France	**Clarisse Agbegnenou**	5212	Manon Deketer (1207); Melkia Auchecorne (1055); Gaëtane Deberdt (767); Perrine Saint Etienne (386); Melodie Turpin (328); Julie Falgon (188); Agathe Devitry (186); Rania Drid (181)
IJF World Ranking List	17	1	Netherlands	**Joanne van Lieshout**	6366	
IJF World Ranking List	17	2	Canada	Catherine Beauchemin-Pinard	6262	
IJF World Ranking List	17	3	Kosovo	Laura Fazliu	5930	
IJF World Ranking List	17	4	Poland	Angelika Szymańska	5738	
IJF World Ranking List	17	5	Australia	Katharina Haecker	5274	
IJF World Ranking List	17	6	Slovenia	Andreja Leški	5086	
IJF World Ranking List	17	7	Japan	**Miku Takaichi**	5020	Megumi Horikawa (3540)
IJF World Ranking List	17	8	Israel	Gili Sharir	4748	
IJF World Ranking List	17	9	Austria	**Lubjana Piovesana**	4201	
IJF World Ranking List	17	10	Great Britain	Lucy Renshall	4194	
IJF World Ranking List	17	11	Croatia	Katarina Krišto	3673	Iva Oberan (3214)
IJF World Ranking List	17	12	Hungary	Szofi Özbas	3648	
IJF World Ranking List	17	13	Portugal	**Bárbara Timo**	3492	
IJF World Ranking List	17	14	South Korea	**Kim Ji-su**	3430	
IJF World Ranking List	17	15	Czech Republic	Renata Zachová	3396	
IJF World Ranking List	17	16	Mexico	Prisca Awiti Alcaraz	3230	
IJF World Ranking List	17	17	Algeria	Amina Belkadi	3102	
Continental quota	Africa		Central African Republic	Nadia Matchiko Guimendego	1178	
Continental quota	Asia		China	Tang Jing	3015	
Continental quota	Asia		Philippines	Kiyomi Watanabe	373	
Continental quota	Europe		Spain	**Cristina Cabaña**	2533	
Continental quota	Europe		Italy	Savita Russo	1461	
Continental quota	America		Cuba	Maylín del Toro Carvajal	3036	
Continental quota	America		Brazil	**Ketleyn Quadros**	2717	
Continental quota	America		Venezuela	Anriquelis Barrios	2047	
Team invitation	Asia		Kazakhstan	**Esmigul Kuyulova**	1666	
Team invitation	Europe		Georgia	**Eter Askilashvili**	937	

=== Middleweight (70 kg) ===
Provisional list. Updated to 13 July 2024.
Bold — secured qualification.

Qualification method	Places	Rank	NOC	Qualified judoka	Ranking points	Qualified* (not highest ranked in NOC)
Host nation	1	—	France	**Marie-Ève Gahié**	5480	Margaux Pinot (4966); Florine Soula (537); Kaïla Issoufi (490); Lucie Jarrot (377)
IJF World Ranking List	17	1	Croatia	Barbara Matić	7300	Lara Cvjetko (5857)
IJF World Ranking List	17	2	Greece	Elisavet Teltsidou	6652	
IJF World Ranking List	17	3	Austria	**Michaela Polleres**	6268	
IJF World Ranking List	17	4	Netherlands	**Sanne van Dijke**	5784	
IJF World Ranking List	17	5	Japan	**Saki Niizoe**	5550	Shiho Tanaka (4208)
IJF World Ranking List	17	6	Germany	**Miriam Butkereit**	5305	Giovanna Scoccimarro (2781)
IJF World Ranking List	17	7	Spain	**Ai Tsunoda**	4672	
IJF World Ranking List	17	9	Australia	Aoife Coughlan	4315	
IJF World Ranking List	17	10	Puerto Rico	María Pérez	3435	
IJF World Ranking List	17	11	Italy	**Kim Polling**	3344	
IJF World Ranking List	17	12	Great Britain	Katie-Jemima Yeats-Brown	2955	Kelly Petersen Pollard (2814)
IJF World Ranking List	17	13	Uzbekistan	Gulnoza Matniyazova	2942	
IJF World Ranking List	17	14	Slovenia	Anka Pogačnik	2912	
IJF World Ranking List	17	15	Belgium	Gabriella Willems	2614	
IJF World Ranking List	17	16	Hungary	Szabina Gercsák	2577	
IJF World Ranking List	17	17	Israel	Maya Goshen	2472	
Continental quota	Africa		Madagascar	Aina Laura Rasoanaivo Razafy	1437	
Continental quota	Asia		North Korea	Mun Song-hui	1476	
Continental quota	Europe		Turkey	Fidan Ögel	2253	
Continental quota	Europe		Bosnia and Herzegovina	Aleksandra Samardžić	1600	
Continental quota	Europe		Denmark	Lærke Olsen	1525	
Returned direct quota			Portugal	Tais Pina	2469	

=== Half-heavyweight (78 kg) ===
Provisional list. Updated to 13 July 2024.
Bold — secured qualification.

Qualification method	Places	Rank	NOC	Qualified judoka	Ranking points	Qualified* (not highest ranked in NOC)
Host nation	1	—	France	Audrey Tcheuméo	5200	**Madeleine Malonga** (5159); Fanny Estelle Posvite (3282); Chloé Buttigieg (1379); Ilana Bouvier (462); Liz Ngelebeya (384); Oceane Zatchi Bi (253)
IJF World Ranking List	17	1	Italy	**Alice Bellandi**	7890	Giorgia Stangherlin (2671)
IJF World Ranking List	17	2	Germany	**Anna-Maria Wagner**	7777	Alina Böhm (5110); Anna Monta Olek (4134)
IJF World Ranking List	17	3	Israel	Inbar Lanir	7015	
IJF World Ranking List	17	4	China	Ma Zhenzhao	5172	
IJF World Ranking List	17	5	Netherlands	**Guusje Steenhuis**	4862	Lieke Derks (2123)
IJF World Ranking List	17	6	Japan	**Rika Takayama**	4802	Shori Hamada (2350); Mami Umeki (2320)
IJF World Ranking List	17	7	Ukraine	Yelyzaveta Lytvynenko	4198	Yuliia Kurchenko (3685)
IJF World Ranking List	17	8	Brazil	**Mayra Aguiar**	4075	
IJF World Ranking List	17	9	Portugal	**Patrícia Sampaio**	3952	
IJF World Ranking List	17	10	Great Britain	Emma Reid	3691	Natalie Powell (2266)
IJF World Ranking List	17	11	Poland	Beata Pacut-Kloczko	3188	
IJF World Ranking List	17	12	South Korea	Yoon Hyun-ji	3124	Lee Jeong-yun (2906)
IJF World Ranking List	17	13	Slovenia	Metka Lobnik	2922	
IJF World Ranking List	17	14	Guinea	Marie Branser	2687	
IJF World Ranking List	17	15	Uzbekistan	Iriskhon Kurbanbaeva	2481	
IJF World Ranking List	17	16	Mongolia	Otgonbayaryn Khüslen	2091	
IJF World Ranking List	17	17	Kosovo	Loriana Kuka	1873	
Continental quota	Africa		Burundi	Ange Ciella Niragira	892	
Continental quota	Africa		Kenya	Zeddy Cherotich	384	
Continental quota	Oceania		New Zealand	Moira de Villiers	1832	
Continental quota	America		Ecuador	Vanessa Chalá	1656	

=== Heavyweight (+78 kg) ===
Provisional list. Updated to 13 July 2024.
Bold — secured qualification.

Qualification method	Places	Rank	NOC	Qualified judoka	Ranking points	Qualified* (not highest ranked in NOC)
Host nation	1	—	France	**Romane Dicko**	7925	Léa Fontaine (4357); Julia Tolofua (4250); Coralie Hayme (2828); Samah Hawa Camara (544); Anne Fatoumata M Bairo (407); Laura Fuseau (161)
IJF World Ranking List	17	1	Israel	Raz Hershko	6040	
IJF World Ranking List	17	2	Turkey	Kayra Ozdemir	5716	Hilal Öztürk (4447)
IJF World Ranking List	17	3	South Korea	Kim Ha-yun	5714	Lee Hyeon-ji (2960)
IJF World Ranking List	17	4	Brazil	**Beatriz Souza**	5475	
IJF World Ranking List	17	5	China	Xu Shiyan	5284	Su Xin (5238)
IJF World Ranking List	17	6	Japan	Wakaba Tomita	5238	Mao Arai (3080); **Akira Sone** (2992)
IJF World Ranking List	17	7	Italy	**Asya Tavano**	4709	
IJF World Ranking List	17	8	Portugal	**Rochele Nunes**	4147	
IJF World Ranking List	17	9	Serbia	**Milica Žabić**	3532	
IJF World Ranking List	17	10	Kazakhstan	**Kamila Berlikash**	3344	
IJF World Ranking List	17	11	Netherlands	**Marit Kamps**	3160	Karen Stevenson (2914)
IJF World Ranking List	17	12	Cuba	Idalys Ortiz	2983	
IJF World Ranking List	17	13	Mongolia	Amarsaikhany Adiyaasüren	2650	
IJF World Ranking List	17	14	Germany	**Renée Lucht**	2578	
IJF World Ranking List	17	16	Bosnia and Herzegovina	Larisa Cerić	2440	
IJF World Ranking List	17	17	New Zealand	Sydnee Andrews	2380	
Continental quota	Africa		Tunisia	Sarra Mzougui	2305	
Continental quota	Africa		Cameroon	Richelle Anita Soppi Mbella	1628	
Continental quota	Asia		India	Tulika Maan	1345	
Continental quota	Europe		Georgia	**Sophio Somkhishvili**	1880	
Team invitation	America		Canada	Ana Laura Portuondo Isasi	732	
Returned continental quota			Ukraine	Khrystyna Homan	1099	

== Continental quota allocation ==
=== Africa ===
Men — 12 places
Rank	NOC	Qualified judoka	Ranking points	Weight class	Ref.
1	Morocco	Abderrahmane Boushita	2456	66	
2	Senegal	Mbagnick Ndiaye	2176	+100	
3	Egypt	Abdelrahman Abdelghany	1647	81	
4	Algeria	Mohamed El Mehdi Lili	1530	+100	
5	Mauritius	Rémi Feuillet	1294	90	
6	The Gambia	Faye Njie	1261	73	
7	Zambia	Simon Zulu	1130	60	
8	Angola	Edmilson Pedro	991	66	
9	Guinea-Bissau	Bubacar Mane	875	+100	
10	Djibouti	Aden-Alexandre Houssein	725	73	
11	Democratic Republic of the Congo	Arnold Kisoka	705	60	
12	Benin	Valentin Houinato	504	81	

Women — 12 places
Rank	NOC	Qualified judoka	Ranking points	Weight class	Ref.
1	Guinea	Mariana Esteves	2468	57	
2	Tunisia	Sarra Mzougui	2305	+78	
3	South Africa	Geronay Whitebooi	1712	48	
4	Cameroon	Richelle Anita Soppi Mbella	1628	+78	
5	Madagascar	Aina Laura Rasoanaivo Razafy	1437	70	
6	Ivory Coast	Zouleiha Dabonne	1390	57	
7	Cape Verde	Djamila Silva	1190	52	
8	Central African Republic	Nadia Matchiko Guimendego	1178	63	
9	Gabon	Virginia Aymard	1108	48	
10	Burundi	Ange Ciella Niragira	892	78	
11	Mozambique	Jacira Ferreira	481	52	
12	Kenya	Zeddy Cherotich	384	78	

=== Asia ===
Men — 10 places
Rank	NOC	Qualified judoka	Ranking points	Weight class	Ref.
1	Kazakhstan	Nurlykhan Sharkhan	2722	100	
2	Mongolia	Batzayaagiin Erdenebayar	2550	73	
3	South Korea	Han Ju-yeop	2537	90	
4	Bahrain	Askerbii Gerbekov	2428	81	
5	Turkmenistan	Serdar Rahymow	2324	66	
6	Lebanon	Caramnob Sagaipov	2132	90	
7	Kyrgyzstan	Kubanychbek Aibek Uulu	2049	66	
8	United Arab Emirates	Aram Grigorian	1968	90	
10	Thailand	Masayuki Terada	968	73	

Women — 10 places
Rank	NOC	Qualified judoka	Ranking points	Weight class	Ref.
1	China	Tang Jing	3015	63	
2	Uzbekistan	Khalimajon Kurbonova	2652	48	
3	Chinese Taipei	Lin Chen-hao	1996	48	
4	North Korea	Mun Song-hui	1476	70	
5	India	Tulika Maan	1345	+78	
6	Indonesia	Maryam March Maharani	827	52	
7	Hong Kong	Wong Ka Lee	743	48	
8	Philippines	Kiyomi Watanabe	373	63	
9	Vietnam	Hoàng Thị Tình	313	48	
10	Nepal	Manita Shrestha Pradhan	208	57	

=== Europe ===
Men — 13 places
Rank	NOC	Qualified judoka	Ranking points	Weight class	Ref.
1	Hungary	Attila Ungvári	3186	81	
2	Germany	Timo Cavelius	2938	81	
3	Belgium	Toma Nikiforov	2904	100	
4	Czech Republic	David Klammert	2650	90	
5	Croatia	Zlatko Kumrić	2637	100	
6	Portugal	João Fernando	2501	81	
7	Estonia	Klen-Kristofer Kaljulaid	2472	90	
8	Poland	Piotr Kuczera	2467	100	
9	Sweden	Marcus Nyman	2378	90	
10	Bulgaria	Mark Hristov	2338	73	
11	Romania	Alex Creţ	2324	90	
12	Moldova	Mihail Latișev	2311	81	
13	Serbia	Strahinja Bunčić	2300	66	

Women — 12 places
Rank	NOC	Qualified judoka	Ranking points	Weight class	Ref.
1	Spain	Cristina Cabaña	2533	63	
2	Azerbaijan	Gultaj Mammadaliyeva	2446	52	
4	Great Britain	Lele Nairne	2320	57	
5	Turkey	Fidan Ögel	2253	70	
6	Netherlands	Julie Beurskens	2104	57	
7	Cyprus	Sofia Asvesta	2052	52	
8	Georgia	Sophio Somkhishvili	1880	+78	
9	Austria	Katharina Tanzer	1643	48	
10	Bosnia and Herzegovina	Aleksandra Samardžić	1600	70	
11	Denmark	Lærke Olsen	1525	70	
12	Italy	Savita Russo	1461	63	

=== Oceania ===
Men — 5 places
Rank	NOC	Qualified judoka	Ranking points	Weight class	Ref.
1	Australia	Josh Katz	1630	60	
2	Fiji	Gerard Takayawa	162	+100	
3	Samoa	William Tai Tin	136	73	
4	Vanuatu	Hugo Cumbo	57	81	

Women — 5 places
Rank	NOC	Qualified judoka	Ranking points	Weight class	Ref.
1	New Zealand	Moira de Villiers	1832	78	
2	Guam	Maria Escano	239	57	
3	Kiribati	Nera Tiebwa	10	57	

=== America ===
Men — 10 places
Rank	NOC	Qualified judoka	Ranking points	Weight class	Ref.
1	Dominican Republic	Robert Florentino	2274	90	
2	United States	John Jayne	2124	90	
3	Puerto Rico	Adrián Gandía	1738	81	
4	Peru	Juan Postigos	1259	66	
5	Chile	Thomas Briceño	1170	100	
6	Jamaica	Ashley McKenzie	939	60	
7	Uruguay	Alain Mikael Aprahamian	731	81	
8	El Salvador	Jairo Moreno	519	60	
9	Costa Rica	Sebastián Sancho	431	60	
10	Haiti	Philippe Metellus	207	73	

Women — 11 places
Rank	NOC	Qualified judoka	Ranking points	Weight class	Ref.
1	Cuba	Maylín del Toro Carvajal	3036	63	
2	Brazil	Ketleyn Quadros	2717	63	
3	Venezuela	Anriquelis Barrios	2047	63	
4	Colombia	Erika Lasso	1955	48	
5	Mexico	Paulina Martínez	1872	52	
6	Canada	Kelly Deguchi	1762	52	
7	Ecuador	Vanessa Chalá	1656	78	
8	Argentina	Sofía Fiora	1453	52	
9	Panama	Kristine Jiménez	1171	57	
10	Paraguay	Gabriela Narváez	707	48	
11	Guatemala	Jacqueline Solís	619	48	

== Returned quota reallocation ==
Rank	NOC	Qualified judoka	Ranking points	Weight class	Ref.
1	Germany	Katharina Menz	2722	W–48	
2	Germany	Igor Wandtke	2702	M–73	
3	Brazil	Natasha Ferreira	2694	W–48	

== Team invitation ==
Rank	NOC	Qualified judoka	Ranking points	Weight class	Ref.
1	Kazakhstan	Esmigul Kuyulova	1666	W–63	
2	Georgia	Eter Askilashvili	937	W–63	
3	Canada	Ana Laura Portuondo Isasi	732	W+78	

== Returned team invitation ==
Rank	NOC	Qualified judoka	Ranking points	Weight class	Ref.
1	Hungary	Bence Pongrácz	1157	M–66	
2	Austria	Samuel Gassner	712	M–73	

== Direct quota reallocation ==
Rank	NOC	Qualified judoka	Ranking points	Weight class	Ref.
1	Hungary	Zsombor Vég	2607	M–100	
2	Uzbekistan	Shukurjon Aminova	2474	W–57	
3	Portugal	Tais Pina	2469	W–70	
4	Germany	Eduard Trippel	2274	M–90	
5	Turkey	Muhammed Demirel	2177	M–66	
6	Slovenia	Enej Marinič	2153	M+100	
7	Poland	Adam Stodolski	2008	M–73	
8	Italy	Andrea Carlino	1863	M–60	
9	Tunisia	Oumaima Bedioui	1760	W–48	

== Continental quota reallocation ==
Rank	NOC	Qualified judoka	Ranking points	Weight class	Ref.
1	Tajikistan	Dzhakhongir Madzhidov	1850	M–100	
2	Ukraine	Khrystyna Homan	1099	W+78	
