= Arnaes Odelín =

Cuban judoka (born 1998)

Personal information
- Born: 13 May 1998 (age 28)
- Occupation: Judoka

Sport
- Country: Cuba
- Sport: Judo
- Weight class: –57 kg

Achievements and titles
- World Champ.: R16 (2021, 2022)
- Pan American Champ.: (2021)
Medal record
Women's judo
Representing Cuba
Pan American Championships
Gold medal – first place	2021 Guadalajara	–57 kg
Silver medal – second place	2022 Lima	–57 kg
Bronze medal – third place	2020 Guadalajara	–57 kg
Central American and Caribbean Games
Gold medal – first place	2023 San Salvador	–57kg

Profile at external databases
- IJF: 23043
- JudoInside.com: 118277
- Updated on 28 June 2023

Arnaes Odelín (born 13 May 1998) is a Cuban judoka. She is the 2021 Pan American champion in the 57 kg category.

In 2019, Odelín competed in the 2019 Pan American Judo Championships and competitions in Tashkent, Brasilia and Osaka.

In 2020, she competed in Grand Slam tournaments in Paris and Dusseldorf. Odelín won bronze in the 57 kg category at the 2020 Pan American Judo Championships, winning against Jéssica Pereira but losing to Miryam Roper. She then won gold at the 2021 Pan American Judo Championships, beating Amelia Fulgentes, Leilani Akiyama and Ketelyn Nascimento.

Odelín competed at the 2021 World Judo Championships in the 57kg category, but was knocked out in the third round by Canadian judoka Jessica Klimkait, the eventual winner. She was also part of Cuba's team in the mixed team category, but lost her match to Eteri Liparteliani in the qualification stages.

She won silver in the 2022 Pan American-Oceania Judo Championships in Lima, only being beaten by Jéssica Lima. In June 2023, Odelín won gold at the 2023 Central American and Caribbean Games in San Salvador, defeating Kady Cabezo.
