= 2023 Judo Grand Slam Paris =

Judo 2023 Judo Grand Slam Paris
- Venue: Accor Arena
- Location: Paris, France
- Dates: 4–5 February 2023
- Competitors: 520 from 82 nations
- Total prize money: 154,000€

Competition at external databases
- Links: IJF • EJU • JudoInside

The 2023 Judo Grand Slam Paris was held at the Accor Arena in Paris, France, from 4 to 5 February 2023 as part of the IJF World Tour and during the 2024 Summer Olympics qualification period.

== Medal summary ==
=== Men's events ===
| Event | Gold | Silver | Bronze |
|---|---|---|---|
| Extra-lightweight (−60 kg) | Balabay Aghayev (AZE) | Cédric Revol (FRA) | Kamoliddin Bakhtiyorov (UZB) |
| Extra-lightweight (−60 kg) | Balabay Aghayev (AZE) | Cédric Revol (FRA) | Lee Ha-rim (KOR) |
| Half-lightweight (−66 kg) | Bogdan Iadov (UKR) | Battogtokhyn Erkhembayar (MGL) | Denis Vieru (MDA) |
| Half-lightweight (−66 kg) | Bogdan Iadov (UKR) | Battogtokhyn Erkhembayar (MGL) | An Jae-hong (KOR) |
| Lightweight (−73 kg) | Lasha Shavdatuashvili (GEO) | Daniel Cargnin (BRA) | Daniyar Shamshayev (KAZ) |
| Lightweight (−73 kg) | Lasha Shavdatuashvili (GEO) | Daniel Cargnin (BRA) | Odgereliin Uranbayar (MGL) |
| Half-middleweight (−81 kg) | Tato Grigalashvili (GEO) | Timo Cavelius (GER) | Alpha Oumar Djalo (FRA) |
| Half-middleweight (−81 kg) | Tato Grigalashvili (GEO) | Timo Cavelius (GER) | François Gauthier-Drapeau (CAN) |
| Middleweight (−90 kg) | Noël van 't End (NED) | Murad Fatiyev (AZE) | Iván Felipe Silva Morales (CUB) |
| Middleweight (−90 kg) | Noël van 't End (NED) | Murad Fatiyev (AZE) | Luka Maisuradze (GEO) |
| Half-heavyweight (−100 kg) | Michael Korrel (NED) | Dzhafar Kostoev (UAE) | Peter Paltchik (ISR) |
| Half-heavyweight (−100 kg) | Michael Korrel (NED) | Dzhafar Kostoev (UAE) | Zelym Kotsoiev (AZE) |
| Heavyweight (+100 kg) | Teddy Riner (FRA) | Hyōga Ōta (JPN) | Alisher Yusupov (UZB) |
| Heavyweight (+100 kg) | Teddy Riner (FRA) | Hyōga Ōta (JPN) | Youn Jae-gu (KOR) |

=== Women's events ===
| Event | Gold | Silver | Bronze |
|---|---|---|---|
| Extra-lightweight (−48 kg) | Blandine Pont (FRA) | Milica Nikolić (SRB) | Mireia Lapuerta Comas (ESP) |
| Extra-lightweight (−48 kg) | Blandine Pont (FRA) | Milica Nikolić (SRB) | Abiba Abuzhakynova (KAZ) |
| Half-lightweight (−52 kg) | Distria Krasniqi (KOS) | Réka Pupp (HUN) | Gefen Primo (ISR) |
| Half-lightweight (−52 kg) | Distria Krasniqi (KOS) | Réka Pupp (HUN) | Amandine Buchard (FRA) |
| Lightweight (−57 kg) | Priscilla Gneto (FRA) | Jessica Klimkait (CAN) | Daria Bilodid (UKR) |
| Lightweight (−57 kg) | Priscilla Gneto (FRA) | Jessica Klimkait (CAN) | Haruka Funakubo (JPN) |
| Half-middleweight (−63 kg) | Gili Sharir (ISR) | Nami Nabekura (JPN) | Maylín del Toro Carvajal (CUB) |
| Half-middleweight (−63 kg) | Gili Sharir (ISR) | Nami Nabekura (JPN) | Angelika Szymańska (POL) |
| Middleweight (−70 kg) | Ai Tsunoda (ESP) | Marie-Ève Gahié (FRA) | Ellen Santana (BRA) |
| Middleweight (−70 kg) | Ai Tsunoda (ESP) | Marie-Ève Gahié (FRA) | Kim Polling (NED) |
| Half-heavyweight (−78 kg) | Audrey Tcheuméo (FRA) | Chloé Buttigieg (FRA) | Guusje Steenhuis (NED) |
| Half-heavyweight (−78 kg) | Audrey Tcheuméo (FRA) | Chloé Buttigieg (FRA) | Lee Jeong-yun (KOR) |
| Heavyweight (+78 kg) | Kim Ha-yun (KOR) | Maya Akiba (JPN) | Romane Dicko (FRA) |
| Heavyweight (+78 kg) | Kim Ha-yun (KOR) | Maya Akiba (JPN) | Julia Tolofua (FRA) |

Source results:

=== Medal table ===
* Host nation (France)

| Rank | Nation | Gold | Silver | Bronze | Total |
|---|---|---|---|---|---|
| 1 | France (FRA)* | 4 | 3 | 4 | 11 |
| 2 | Netherlands (NED) | 2 | 0 | 2 | 4 |
| 3 | Georgia (GEO) | 2 | 0 | 1 | 3 |
| 4 | Azerbaijan (AZE) | 1 | 1 | 1 | 3 |
| 5 | South Korea (KOR) | 1 | 0 | 4 | 5 |
| 6 | Israel (ISR) | 1 | 0 | 2 | 3 |
| 7 | Spain (ESP) | 1 | 0 | 1 | 2 |
| 7 | Ukraine (UKR) | 1 | 0 | 1 | 2 |
| 9 | Kosovo (KOS) | 1 | 0 | 0 | 1 |
| 10 | Japan (JPN) | 0 | 3 | 1 | 4 |
| 11 | Brazil (BRA) | 0 | 1 | 1 | 2 |
| 11 | Canada (CAN) | 0 | 1 | 1 | 2 |
| 11 | Mongolia (MGL) | 0 | 1 | 1 | 2 |
| 14 | Germany (GER) | 0 | 1 | 0 | 1 |
| 14 | Hungary (HUN) | 0 | 1 | 0 | 1 |
| 14 | Serbia (SRB) | 0 | 1 | 0 | 1 |
| 14 | United Arab Emirates (UAE) | 0 | 1 | 0 | 1 |
| 18 | Cuba (CUB) | 0 | 0 | 2 | 2 |
| 18 | Kazakhstan (KAZ) | 0 | 0 | 2 | 2 |
| 18 | Uzbekistan (UZB) | 0 | 0 | 2 | 2 |
| 21 | Moldova (MDA) | 0 | 0 | 1 | 1 |
| 21 | Poland (POL) | 0 | 0 | 1 | 1 |
| Totals (22 entries) | | 14 | 14 | 28 | 56 |

== Prize money ==
The sums written are per medalist, bringing the total prizes awarded to €154,000. (retrieved from:)

| Medal | Total | Judoka | Coach |
|---|---|---|---|
| Gold | €5,000 | €4,000 | €1,000 |
| Silver | €3,000 | €2,400 | €600 |
| Bronze | €1,500 | €1,200 | €300 |
