= 2024 Judo Grand Slam Tashkent =

Judo competition

Judo 2024 Judo Grand Slam Tashkent
- Venue: Humo Arena
- Location: Tashkent, Uzbekistan
- Dates: 1–3 March 2024
- Competitors: 495 from 68 nations
- Total prize money: €154,000

Competition at external databases
- Links: IJF • EJU • JudoInside

The 2024 Judo Grand Slam Tashkent was a Judo Grand Slam tournament held at the Humo Arena in Tashkent, Uzbekistan, from 1 to 3 March 2024 as part of the IJF World Tour and during the 2024 Summer Olympics qualification period.

== Medal summary ==
=== Men's events ===
Event	Gold	Silver	Bronze
Extra-lightweight (−60 kg)	Doston Ruziev (UZB)	Giorgi Sardalashvili (GEO)	Salih Yıldız (TUR)
Extra-lightweight (−60 kg)	Doston Ruziev (UZB)	Giorgi Sardalashvili (GEO)	Romain Valadier-Picard (FRA)
Half-lightweight (−66 kg)	Nurali Emomali (TJK)	Baruch Shmailov (ISR)	Willian Lima (BRA)
Half-lightweight (−66 kg)	Nurali Emomali (TJK)	Baruch Shmailov (ISR)	Murad Chopanov (AIN)
Lightweight (−73 kg)	Manuel Lombardo (ITA)	Danil Lavrentev (AIN)	Obidkhon Nomonov (UZB)
Lightweight (−73 kg)	Manuel Lombardo (ITA)	Danil Lavrentev (AIN)	Shakhram Ahadov (UZB)
Half-middleweight (−81 kg)	Matthias Casse (BEL)	Shamil Borchashvili (AUT)	Mykhailo Svidrak (UKR)
Half-middleweight (−81 kg)	Matthias Casse (BEL)	Shamil Borchashvili (AUT)	Takanori Nagase (JPN)
Middleweight (−90 kg)	Theodoros Tselidis (GRE)	Ivaylo Ivanov (BUL)	Davlat Bobonov (UZB)
Middleweight (−90 kg)	Theodoros Tselidis (GRE)	Ivaylo Ivanov (BUL)	Christian Parlati (ITA)
Half-heavyweight (−100 kg)	Muzaffarbek Turoboyev (UZB)	Matvey Kanikovskiy (AIN)	Dota Arai (JPN)
Half-heavyweight (−100 kg)	Muzaffarbek Turoboyev (UZB)	Matvey Kanikovskiy (AIN)	Piotr Kuczera (POL)
Heavyweight (+100 kg)	Hyōga Ōta (JPN)	Tamerlan Bashaev (AIN)	Kokoro Kageura (JPN)
Heavyweight (+100 kg)	Hyōga Ōta (JPN)	Tamerlan Bashaev (AIN)	Inal Tasoev (AIN)

Source results:

=== Women's events ===
Event	Gold	Silver	Bronze
Extra-lightweight (−48 kg)	Sabina Giliazova (AIN)	Abiba Abuzhakynova (KAZ)	Tara Babulfath (SWE)
Extra-lightweight (−48 kg)	Sabina Giliazova (AIN)	Abiba Abuzhakynova (KAZ)	Tuğçe Beder (TUR)
Half-lightweight (−52 kg)	Amandine Buchard (FRA)	Gulkhayo Juraeva (UZB)	Lkhagvasürengiin Sosorbaram (MGL)
Half-lightweight (−52 kg)	Amandine Buchard (FRA)	Gulkhayo Juraeva (UZB)	Chelsie Giles (GBR)
Lightweight (−57 kg)	Priscilla Gneto (FRA)	Haruka Funakubo (JPN)	Arleta Podolak (POL)
Lightweight (−57 kg)	Priscilla Gneto (FRA)	Haruka Funakubo (JPN)	Pauline Starke (GER)
Half-middleweight (−63 kg)	Clarisse Agbegnenou (FRA)	Momo Tatsukawa (JPN)	Andreja Leški (SLO)
Half-middleweight (−63 kg)	Clarisse Agbegnenou (FRA)	Momo Tatsukawa (JPN)	Nami Nabekura (JPN)
Middleweight (−70 kg)	Miriam Butkereit (GER)	Margaux Pinot (FRA)	Saki Niizoe (JPN)
Middleweight (−70 kg)	Miriam Butkereit (GER)	Margaux Pinot (FRA)	Margit de Voogd (NED)
Half-heavyweight (−78 kg)	Rika Takayama (JPN)	Fanny Estelle Posvite (FRA)	Alice Bellandi (ITA)
Half-heavyweight (−78 kg)	Rika Takayama (JPN)	Fanny Estelle Posvite (FRA)	Anna-Maria Wagner (GER)
Heavyweight (+78 kg)	Su Xin (CHN)	Ruri Takahashi (JPN)	Maya Akiba (JPN)
Heavyweight (+78 kg)	Su Xin (CHN)	Ruri Takahashi (JPN)	Elis Startseva (AIN)

Source results:

=== Medal table ===
* Host nation (Uzbekistan)

Rank	Nation	Gold	Silver	Bronze	Total
1	France (FRA)	3	2	1	6
2	Japan (JPN)	2	3	6	11
3	Uzbekistan (UZB)*	2	1	3	6
–	Individual Neutral Athletes (AIN)	1	3	3	7
4	Germany (GER)	1	0	2	3
4	Italy (ITA)	1	0	2	3
6	Belgium (BEL)	1	0	0	1
6	China (CHN)	1	0	0	1
6	Greece (GRE)	1	0	0	1
6	Tajikistan (TJK)	1	0	0	1
10	Austria (AUT)	0	1	0	1
10	Bulgaria (BUL)	0	1	0	1
10	Georgia (GEO)	0	1	0	1
10	Israel (ISR)	0	1	0	1
10	Kazakhstan (KAZ)	0	1	0	1
15	Poland (POL)	0	0	2	2
15	Turkey (TUR)	0	0	2	2
17	Brazil (BRA)	0	0	1	1
17	Great Britain (GBR)	0	0	1	1
17	Mongolia (MGL)	0	0	1	1
17	Netherlands (NED)	0	0	1	1
17	Slovenia (SLO)	0	0	1	1
17	Sweden (SWE)	0	0	1	1
17	Ukraine (UKR)	0	0	1	1
Totals (23 entries)		14	14	28	56

== Prize money ==
The sums written are per medalist, bringing the total prizes awarded to €154,000. (retrieved from:)

Medal	Total	Judoka	Coach
Gold	€5,000	€4,000	€1,000
Silver	€3,000	€2,400	€600
Bronze	€1,500	€1,200	€300
