= Kurash at the 2018 Asian Games – Men's 90 kg =

Martial arts event

Men's 90 kg at the 2018 Asian Games
- Venue: Jakarta Convention Center
- Dates: 30 August 2018
- Competitors: 21 from 14 nations

Medalists
gold medal	Shermukhammad Jandreev	Uzbekistan
silver medal	Yakhyo Imamov	Uzbekistan
bronze medal	Yersultan Muzapparov	Kazakhstan
bronze medal	Husein Misri	Kuwait

The men's Kurash 90 kilograms competition at the 2018 Asian Games in Jakarta, Indonesia was held on 30 August at the JCC Assembly Hall.

Kurash is a traditional martial art from Uzbekistan that resembles wrestling. There are three assessment system in Kurash, namely Halal, Yambosh, and Chala. Halal is if an athlete Kurash is able to slam his opponent in the back. Yambosh is the imperfect of Halal, two Yambosh same as Halal.

== Schedule ==
All times are Western Indonesia Time (UTC+07:00)

Date	Time	Event
Thursday, 30 August 2018	14:00	Round of 32
Thursday, 30 August 2018	14:00	Round of 16
Thursday, 30 August 2018	14:00	Quarterfinals
Thursday, 30 August 2018	17:00	Semifinals
Thursday, 30 August 2018	17:00	Final

== Results ==
=== Final ===
Final
Yakhyo Imamov (UZB)	010
Shermukhammad Jandreev (UZB)	011

=== Top half ===
Round of 32
Ajmal Ishaqzai (AFG)	001
Yersultan Muzapparov (KAZ)	112
Ganbaataryn Lündeejantsan (MGL)	000
Lo Yu-hsuan (TPE)	100
Ghasem Ahadi (IRI)	001
Yakhyo Imamov (UZB)	101

Round of 16
Yersultan Muzapparov (KAZ)	002
Lê Anh Tài (VIE)	000
Lo Yu-hsuan (TPE)	012
Putu Wiradamungga (INA)	000
Yakhyo Imamov (UZB)	110
Divesh (IND)	000
Guwanç Begaliýew (TKM)	102
Jason Balabal (PHI)	000

Quarterfinals
Yersultan Muzapparov (KAZ)	101
Lo Yu-hsuan (TPE)	000
Yakhyo Imamov (UZB)	010
Guwanç Begaliýew (TKM)	001

Semifinals
Yersultan Muzapparov (KAZ)	001
Yakhyo Imamov (UZB)	010

=== Bottom half ===
Round of 32
Muhammad Dhifa Alfais (INA)	000
Danish Sharma (IND)	002
Batkhuyagiin Gonchigsüren (MGL)	001
Sanjar Abdyrahmanow (TKM)	103

Round of 16
Danish Sharma (IND)	012
Mohanad Abueida (PLE)	001
Husein Misri (KUW)	100
Davlatshoi Gazalshoi (TJK)	000
Sanjar Abdyrahmanow (TKM)	001
Shermukhammad Jandreev (UZB)	012
Mohammad Malekmohammadi (IRI)	010
Shirzad Azizi (AFG)	100

Quarterfinals
Danish Sharma (IND)	000
Husein Misri (KUW)	101
Shermukhammad Jandreev (UZB)	110
Shirzad Azizi (AFG)	000

Semifinals
Husein Misri (KUW)	012
Shermukhammad Jandreev (UZB)	111
