= 2023 World Judo Championships – Women's 57 kg =

Judo competition

Judo Women's 57 kg at the 2023 World Judo Championships
- Venue: Ali Bin Hamad Al Attiya Arena
- Location: Doha, Qatar
- Date: 9 May 2023
- Competitors: 50 from 37 nations
- Total prize money: €57,000

Medalists
gold medal	Christa Deguchi (2nd title)	Canada
silver medal	Haruka Funakubo	Japan
bronze medal	Lkhagvatogoogiin Enkhriilen	Mongolia
bronze medal	Jessica Klimkait	Canada

Competition at external databases
- Links: IJF • JudoInside

The Women's 57 kg event at the 2023 World Judo Championships was held at the Ali Bin Hamad al-Attiyah Arena in Doha, Qatar on 9 May 2023.

== Results ==
=== Finals ===
Semi-finals
(Turkey) Hasret Bozkurt	00
(Japan) Haruka Funakubo	10
(Canada) Christa Deguchi	02
(Mongolia) Lkhagvatogoogiin Enkhriilen	00

Final
(Japan) Haruka Funakubo	00
(Canada) Christa Deguchi	11

=== Repechage ===
Repechage
(Kosovo) Nora Gjakova	00
(South Korea) Huh Mi-mi	01
(France) Sarah-Léonie Cysique	00
(Canada) Jessica Klimkait	01

Bronze medal
(South Korea) Huh Mi-mi	00
(Mongolia) Lkhagvatogoogiin Enkhriilen	10
(Canada) Jessica Klimkait	02
(Turkey) Hasret Bozkurt	00

=== Pool A ===
First round
(Latvia) Anastasija Sokirjanska	00
(Turkey) Hasret Bozkurt	01
(Bosnia and Herzegovina) Anđela Samardžić	11
(Australia) Charisma Taylor	00
(United Kingdom) Lele Nairne	00
(Italy) Thauany Capanni Dias	10
(United States) Tasha Cancela	00
(Serbia) Marica Perišić	10

Round of 32
(Brazil) Rafaela Silva	00
(Turkey) Hasret Bozkurt	11
(Bosnia and Herzegovina) Anđela Samardžić	10
Muna Dahouk	00
(Kosovo) Nora Gjakova	10
(Italy) Thauany Capanni Dias	00
(Serbia) Marica Perišić	00
(Germany) Seija Ballhaus	10

Round of 16
(Turkey) Hasret Bozkurt	01
(Bosnia and Herzegovina) Anđela Samardžić	00
(Kosovo) Nora Gjakova	10
(Germany) Seija Ballhaus	00

Quarter-finals
(Turkey) Hasret Bozkurt	10
(Kosovo) Nora Gjakova	00

=== Pool B ===
First round
Kseniia Galitskaia	10
(South Africa) Jasmine Martin	00
(Slovenia) Kaja Kajzer	10
(Poland) Julia Kowalczyk	00
(Dominican Republic) Ana Rosa García	00
(Uzbekistan) Shukurjon Aminova	10
(Guinea) Mariana Esteves	00
(Croatia) Tihea Topolovec	01
(Mongolia) Mönkhtsedeviin Ichinkhorloo	00
(Chinese Taipei) Lien Chen-ling	10

Round of 32
(Japan) Haruka Funakubo	11
Kseniia Galitskaia	00
(Slovenia) Kaja Kajzer	10
(Portugal) Telma Monteiro	00
(South Korea) Huh Mi-mi	01
(Uzbekistan) Shukurjon Aminova	00
(Croatia) Tihea Topolovec	00
(Chinese Taipei) Lien Chen-ling	10

Round of 16
(Japan) Haruka Funakubo	10
(Slovenia) Kaja Kajzer	00
(South Korea) Huh Mi-mi	01
(Chinese Taipei) Lien Chen-ling	00

Quarter-finals
(Japan) Haruka Funakubo	10
(South Korea) Huh Mi-mi	00

=== Pool C ===
First round
(Uzbekistan) Nilufar Ermaganbetova	00
(Turkmenistan) Maýsa Pardaýewa	02
Daria Kurbonmamadova	01
(United Kingdom) Nekoda Smythe-Davis	02
~~(Guinea) M'mah Bangoura~~
(China) Cai Qi	w/o
(Cuba) Arnaes Odelín	00
(France) Sarah-Léonie Cysique	01

Round of 32
(Canada) Christa Deguchi	02
(Turkmenistan) Maýsa Pardaýewa	00
(United Kingdom) Nekoda Smythe-Davis	w/o
~~(Qatar) Salha Al-Badi~~
(Georgia (country)) Eteri Liparteliani	01
(China) Cai Qi	00
(France) Sarah-Léonie Cysique	10
(Germany) Pauline Starke	00

Round of 16
(Canada) Christa Deguchi	10
(United Kingdom) Nekoda Smythe-Davis	00
(Georgia (country)) Eteri Liparteliani	00
(France) Sarah-Léonie Cysique	01

Quarter-finals
(Canada) Christa Deguchi	11
(France) Sarah-Léonie Cysique	00

=== Pool D ===
First round
(Italy) Veronica Toniolo	10
(United Arab Emirates) Altantsetseg Batsukh	00
(Kosovo) Flaka Loxha	10
(Mauritius) Christianne Legentil	00
(Czech Republic) Věra Zemanová	00
(Brazil) Jéssica Lima	02
(South Africa) Donne Breytenbach	00
(United States) Mariah Holguin	10
(New Zealand) Qona Christie	10
(Kazakhstan) Bakyt Kussakbayeva	00

Round of 32
(Canada) Jessica Klimkait	10
(Italy) Veronica Toniolo	00
(Kosovo) Flaka Loxha	00
(Brazil) Jéssica Lima	01
(Israel) Timna Nelson-Levy	10
(United States) Mariah Holguin	00
(New Zealand) Qona Christie	00
(Mongolia) Lkhagvatogoogiin Enkhriilen	02

Round of 16
(Canada) Jessica Klimkait	01
(Brazil) Jéssica Lima	00
(Israel) Timna Nelson-Levy	00
(Mongolia) Lkhagvatogoogiin Enkhriilen	10

Quarter-finals
(Canada) Jessica Klimkait	00
(Mongolia) Lkhagvatogoogiin Enkhriilen	10

== Prize money ==
The sums listed bring the total prizes awarded to €57,000 for the individual event.

Medal	Total	Judoka	Coach
Gold	€26,000	€20,800	€5,200
Silver	€15,000	€12,000	€3,000
Bronze	€8,000	€6,400	€1,600
