= 2022 Judo Grand Slam Tokyo =

Judo Competition

Judo 2022 Judo Grand Slam Tokyo
- Venue: Tokyo Metropolitan Gymnasium
- Location: Tokyo, Japan
- Dates: 3–4 December 2022
- Competitors: 346 from 59 nations
- Total prize money: €154,000

Competition at external databases
- Links: IJF • EJU • JudoInside

The 2022 Judo Grand Slam Tokyo was held at the Tokyo Metropolitan Gymnasium in Tokyo, Japan, from 3 to 4 December 2022 as part of the IJF World Tour and during the 2024 Summer Olympics qualification period.

== Medal summary ==
=== Medal table ===
* Host nation (Japan)

Rank	Nation	Gold	Silver	Bronze	Total
1	Japan (JPN)*	12	12	15	39
2	South Korea (KOR)	1	0	2	3
3	Italy (ITA)	1	0	0	1
4	Australia (AUS)	0	1	0	1
4	Germany (GER)	0	1	0	1
6	France (FRA)	0	0	3	3
7	Mongolia (MGL)	0	0	2	2
8	Georgia (GEO)	0	0	1	1
8	Greece (GRE)	0	0	1	1
8	Kazakhstan (KAZ)	0	0	1	1
8	Netherlands (NED)	0	0	1	1
8	Poland (POL)	0	0	1	1
8	Spain (ESP)	0	0	1	1
Totals (13 entries)		14	14	28	56

=== Men's events ===
Event	Gold	Silver	Bronze
Extra-lightweight (−60 kg)	Jeon Seung-beom (KOR)	Hayato Kondo (JPN)	Lee Ha-rim (KOR)
Extra-lightweight (−60 kg)	Jeon Seung-beom (KOR)	Hayato Kondo (JPN)	Genki Koga (JPN)
Half-lightweight (−66 kg)	Joshiro Maruyama (JPN)	Shinsei Hattori (JPN)	Maxime Gobert (FRA)
Half-lightweight (−66 kg)	Joshiro Maruyama (JPN)	Shinsei Hattori (JPN)	Yondonperenlein Baskhüü (MGL)
Lightweight (−73 kg)	Soichi Hashimoto (JPN)	Hayato Koga (JPN)	Ken Oyoshi (JPN)
Lightweight (−73 kg)	Soichi Hashimoto (JPN)	Hayato Koga (JPN)	Ksawery Morka (POL)
Half-middleweight (−81 kg)	Kenya Kohara (JPN)	Takanori Nagase (JPN)	Sotaro Fujiwara (JPN)
Half-middleweight (−81 kg)	Kenya Kohara (JPN)	Takanori Nagase (JPN)	Alpha Oumar Djalo (FRA)
Middleweight (−90 kg)	Kosuke Mashiyama (JPN)	Eduard Trippel (GER)	Sanshiro Murao (JPN)
Middleweight (−90 kg)	Kosuke Mashiyama (JPN)	Eduard Trippel (GER)	Lasha Bekauri (GEO)
Half-heavyweight (−100 kg)	Gennaro Pirelli (ITA)	Kentaro Iida (JPN)	Kaito Green (JPN)
Half-heavyweight (−100 kg)	Gennaro Pirelli (ITA)	Kentaro Iida (JPN)	Kotaro Ueoka (JPN)
Heavyweight (+100 kg)	Hyōga Ōta (JPN)	Kokoro Kageura (JPN)	Hisayoshi Harasawa (JPN)
Heavyweight (+100 kg)	Hyōga Ōta (JPN)	Kokoro Kageura (JPN)	Galymzhan Krikbay (KAZ)

=== Women's events ===
Event	Gold	Silver	Bronze
Extra-lightweight (−48 kg)	Kano Miyaki (JPN)	Rina Tatsukawa (JPN)	Wakana Koga (JPN)
Extra-lightweight (−48 kg)	Kano Miyaki (JPN)	Rina Tatsukawa (JPN)	Natsumi Tsunoda (JPN)
Half-lightweight (−52 kg)	Uta Abe (JPN)	Ai Shishime (JPN)	Kisumi Omori (JPN)
Half-lightweight (−52 kg)	Uta Abe (JPN)	Ai Shishime (JPN)	Lkhagvasürengiin Sosorbaram (MGL)
Lightweight (−57 kg)	Haruka Funakubo (JPN)	Tsukasa Yoshida (JPN)	Momo Tamaoki (JPN)
Lightweight (−57 kg)	Haruka Funakubo (JPN)	Tsukasa Yoshida (JPN)	Akari Omori (JPN)
Half-middleweight (−63 kg)	Miku Takaichi (JPN)	Seiko Watanabe (JPN)	Megumi Horikawa (JPN)
Half-middleweight (−63 kg)	Miku Takaichi (JPN)	Seiko Watanabe (JPN)	Nami Nabekura (JPN)
Middleweight (−70 kg)	Saki Niizoe (JPN)	Aoife Coughlan (AUS)	Elisavet Teltsidou (GRE)
Middleweight (−70 kg)	Saki Niizoe (JPN)	Aoife Coughlan (AUS)	Ai Tsunoda (ESP)
Half-heavyweight (−78 kg)	Rika Takayama (JPN)	Shori Hamada (JPN)	Mami Umeki (JPN)
Half-heavyweight (−78 kg)	Rika Takayama (JPN)	Shori Hamada (JPN)	Natascha Ausma (NED)
Heavyweight (+78 kg)	Akira Sone (JPN)	Maya Akiba (JPN)	Kim Ha-yun (KOR)
Heavyweight (+78 kg)	Akira Sone (JPN)	Maya Akiba (JPN)	Léa Fontaine (FRA)

Source Results

== Prize money ==
The sums written are per medalist, bringing the total prizes awarded to €154,000. (retrieved from:)

Medal	Total	Judoka	Coach
Gold	€5,000	€4,000	€1,000
Silver	€3,000	€2,400	€600
Bronze	€1,500	€1,200	€300
