= Caroline Fritze =

German judoka (born 2000)

Personal information
- Born: 4 June 2000 (age 26)
- Occupation: Judoka

Sport
- Country: Germany
- Sport: Judo
- Weight class: ‍–‍57 kg
Medal record
Women's judo
Representing Germany
IJF Grand Slam
Silver medal – second place	2021 Paris	‍–‍57 kg
IJF Grand Prix
Bronze medal – third place	2021 Zagreb	‍–‍57 kg

Profile at external databases
- IJF: 21761
- JudoInside.com: 97438
- Updated on 21 November 2022

Caroline Fritze (born 4 June 2000) is a German judoka. She is the silver medalist in the ‍–‍57 kg at the 2021 Judo Grand Slam Paris
