= Enzo Gibelli =

French judoka (born 2000)

Personal information
- Nationality: French
- Born: 11 May 2000 (age 26)

Sport
- Country: France
- Sport: Judo
- Event: –73 kg
Medal record
World Championships
Silver medal – second place	2021 Budapest	Mixed team

Enzo Gibelli (born 11 May 2000) is a French judoka.

He won a medal at the 2021 World Judo Championships.

He competed in the men's 73 kg event at the 2022 Mediterranean Games held in Oran, Algeria.
