= Kenshi Harada =

Japanese judoka (born 1998)

Personal information
- Nationality: Japanese
- Born: 10 September 1998 (age 27)
- Occupation: Judoka

Sport
- Country: Japan
- Sport: Judo
- Weight class: –73 kg
Medal record
Men's judo
Representing Japan
World Championships
Gold medal – first place	2021 Budapest	Mixed team
Gold medal – first place	2022 Tashkent	Mixed team
IJF Grand Slam
Gold medal – first place	2021 Paris	–73 kg
Asian Junior Championships
Bronze medal – third place	2017 Bishkek	–66 kg

Profile at external databases
- IJF: 40571
- JudoInside.com: 110331
- Updated on 15 August 2022

Kenshi Harada (born 10 September 1998) is a Japanese judoka.

He won a medal at the 2021 World Judo Championships.
