= Farangiz Khojieva =

Uzbekistani judoka (born 2000)

Personal information
- Nationality: Uzbekistani
- Born: 8 May 2000 (age 26)
- Occupation: Judoka

Sport
- Country: Uzbekistan
- Sport: Judo
- Weight class: –63 kg
Medal record
World Championships
Bronze medal – third place	2021 Budapest	Mixed team

Profile at external databases
- IJF: 52316
- JudoInside.com: 114514
- Updated on 7 November 2021

Farangiz Khojieva (born 8 May 2000) is an Uzbekistani judoka. She competed in the women's 63 kg event at the 2020 Summer Olympics held in Tokyo, Japan.

She won a medal at the 2021 World Judo Championships.
