= 2021 World Judo Championships – Women's 57 kg =

Judo competition

Judo Women's 57 kg at the 2021 World Judo Championships
- Venue: László Papp Budapest Sports Arena
- Location: Budapest, Hungary
- Date: 8 June
- Competitors: 39 from 32 nations
- Total prize money: 57,000€

Medalists
gold medal	Jessica Klimkait (1st title)	Canada
silver medal	Momo Tamaoki	Japan
bronze medal	Nora Gjakova	Kosovo
bronze medal	Theresa Stoll	Germany

Competition at external databases
- Links: IJF • JudoInside

The Women's 57 kg competition at the 2021 World Judo Championships was held on 8 June 2021.

== Results ==
=== Finals ===
Semi-finals
(Canada) Christa Deguchi	00
(Japan) Momo Tamaoki	01
(Canada) Jessica Klimkait	11
(Kosovo) Nora Gjakova	00

Final
(Japan) Momo Tamaoki	00
(Canada) Jessica Klimkait	01

=== Repechage ===
Repechage
(Serbia) Marica Perišić	10
(Portugal) Telma Monteiro	00

Third place
(Serbia) Marica Perišić	00
(Kosovo) Nora Gjakova	01

Repechage
(Germany) Theresa Stoll	11
Anastasia Konkina	00

Third place
(Germany) Theresa Stoll	10
(Canada) Christa Deguchi	00

=== Pool A ===
First round
(Kosovo) Flaka Loxha	10
(New Zealand) Justine Bishop	00

Second round
(Canada) Christa Deguchi	10
(Kosovo) Flaka Loxha	00
(Poland) Anna Kuczera	11
(The Bahamas) Cynthia Rahming	00
(Mongolia) Dorjsürengiin Sumiyaa	00
(South Korea) Kim Jan-di	01
(Serbia) Marica Perišić	01
(Romania) Loredana Ohâi	00

Third round
(Canada) Christa Deguchi	01
(Poland) Anna Kuczera	00
(South Korea) Kim Jan-di	00
(Serbia) Marica Perišić	10

Quarterfinals
(Canada) Christa Deguchi	10
(Serbia) Marica Perišić	00

=== Pool B ===
First round
(Georgia (country)) Eteri Liparteliani	10
(Czech Republic) Věra Zemanová	00
(Bulgaria) Ivelina Ilieva	10
(Austria) Sabrina Filzmoser	00

Second round
(Japan) Momo Tamaoki	10
(Ivory Coast) Zouleiha Dabonne	00
(Georgia (country)) Eteri Liparteliani	11
(Belgium) Mina Libeer	00
(Portugal) Telma Monteiro	10
(Bulgaria) Ivelina Ilieva	00
(Hungary) Andrea Kármán	10
(United States) Amelia Fulgentes	00

Third round
(Japan) Momo Tamaoki	10
(Georgia (country)) Eteri Liparteliani	01
(Portugal) Telma Monteiro	10
(Hungary) Andrea Kármán	00

Quarterfinals
(Japan) Momo Tamaoki	10
(Portugal) Telma Monteiro	00

=== Pool C ===
First round
(Panama) Miryam Roper	10
(Serbia) Jovana Rogić	00
Sanda Al-Dass	00
(United States) Mariah Holguin	10

Second round
(Canada) Jessica Klimkait	10
(Panama) Miryam Roper	00
(Cuba) Arnaes Odelín	10
(Hong Kong) Leung Po Sum	00
(Germany) Theresa Stoll	11
(United States) Mariah Holguin	00
(South Africa) Donne Breytenbach	00
(Kazakhstan) Sevara Nishanbayeva	11

Third round
(Canada) Jessica Klimkait	11
(Cuba) Arnaes Odelín	00
(Germany) Theresa Stoll	10
(Kazakhstan) Sevara Nishanbayeva	00

Quarterfinals
(Canada) Jessica Klimkait	01
(Germany) Theresa Stoll	00

=== Pool D ===
First round
(Poland) Julia Kowalczyk	10
(Uzbekistan) Shukurjon Aminova	00
(Jordan) Hadeel El-Almi	00
(Brazil) Ketelyn Nascimento	11

Second round
(Kosovo) Nora Gjakova	01
(Poland) Julia Kowalczyk	00
(Tunisia) Ghofran Khelifi	01
(Netherlands) Sanne Verhagen	11
(Hungary) Hedvig Karakas	10
(Brazil) Ketelyn Nascimento	00
Anastasia Konkina	10
(Portugal) Wilsa Gomes	00

Third round
(Kosovo) Nora Gjakova	01
(Netherlands) Sanne Verhagen	00
(Hungary) Hedvig Karakas	00
Anastasia Konkina	10

Quarterfinals
(Kosovo) Nora Gjakova	10
Anastasia Konkina	00

== Prize money ==
The sums listed bring the total prizes awarded to €57,000 for the individual event.

Medal	Total	Judoka	Coach
Gold	€26,000	€20,800	€5,200
Silver	€15,000	€12,000	€3,000
Bronze	€8,000	€6,400	€1,600
