= Kosuke Mashiyama =

Japanese judoka

Personal information
- Born: 9 March 1999 (age 27)
- Occupation: Judoka

Sport
- Country: Japan
- Sport: Judo
- Weight class: ‍–‍90 kg

Achievements and titles
- World Champ.: R32 (2022)
- Asian Champ.: (gold) (2019)
Medal record
Men's judo
Representing Japan
World Championships
Gold medal – first place	2021 Budapest	Mixed team
Gold medal – first place	2022 Tashkent	Mixed team
Asian Championships
Gold medal – first place	2019 Fujairah	‍–‍90 kg
IJF Grand Slam
Gold medal – first place	2021 Baku	‍–‍90 kg
Gold medal – first place	2022 Tokyo	‍–‍90 kg
World Juniors Championships
Gold medal – first place	2018 Nassau	Mixed team
Gold medal – first place	2019 Marrakesh	Mixed team
Bronze medal – third place	2018 Nassau	‍–‍90 kg

Profile at external databases
- IJF: 43238
- JudoInside.com: 116499
- Updated on 3 December 2022

Kosuke Mashiyama (born 9 March 1999) is a Japanese judoka.

Mashiyama won a medal at the mixed team event of the 2021 World Championships.
