= 2021 World Judo Championships – Mixed team =

Judo competition

Judo Mixed team at the 2021 World Judo Championships
- Venue: László Papp Budapest Sports Arena
- Location: Budapest, Hungary
- Date: 13 June 2021
- Competitors: 149 from 15 nations
- Total prize money: 200,000€

Medalists
gold medal	Maya Akiba; Haruka Funakubo; Kenshi Harada; Soichi Hashimoto; Kokoro Kageura; Kosuke Mashiyama; Kenta Nagasawa; Saki Niizoe; Yoko Ono; Kazuya Sato; Momo Tamaoki; Wakaba Tomita	Japan
silver medal	Francis Damier; Gaëtane Deberdt; Clémence Eme; Léa Fontaine; Joan-Benjamin Gaba; Marie-Ève Gahié; Enzo Gibelli; Astride Gneto; Cyrille Maret; Alexis Mathieu; Cédric Olivar; Julia Tolofua	France
bronze medal	Shukurjon Aminova; Davlat Bobonov; Rinata Ilmatova; Shermukhammad Jandreev; Diyora Keldiyorova; Farangiz Khojieva; Iriskhon Kurbanbaeva; Gulnoza Matniyazova; Obidkhon Nomonov; Sardor Nurillaev; Bekmurod Oltiboev; Muzaffarbek Turoboyev	Uzbekistan
bronze medal	Maria Suelen Altheman; Eduardo Barbosa; Rafael Macedo; David Moura; Ketelyn Nascimento; Larissa Pimenta; Maria Portela; Ketleyn Quadros; Eduardo Yudy Santos; Rafael Silva; Beatriz Souza	Brazil

Champions
- Mixed team: Japan (4th title)

Competition at external databases
- Links: IJF • EJU • JudoInside

The mixed team competition at the 2021 World Judo Championships was held on 13 June 2021.

== Results ==
=== Bracket ===
Round of 16
IJF Refugee Team	0
Ukraine	4
Russian Judo Federation	4
Mongolia	0
Germany	3
South Korea	4
Brazil	4
Kazakhstan	3
Hungary	2
Uzbekistan	4
France	4
Netherlands	0
Cuba	1
Georgia	4

Quarter-finals
Japan	4
Ukraine	0
Russian Judo Federation	4
South Korea	0
Brazil	0
Uzbekistan	4
France	4
Georgia	3

Semi-finals
Japan	4
Russian Judo Federation	0
Uzbekistan	1
France	4

Final
Japan	4
France	0

==== Repechage brackets ====
Repechage
Ukraine	3
South Korea	4

Third place
South Korea	1
Uzbekistan	4

Repechage
Brazil	4
Georgia	1

Third place
Brazil	4
Russian Judo Federation	2

== Matches ==
=== Round of 16 ===
==== International Judo Federation Refugee Team vs Ukraine ====
Weight Class	IJF	Result	Ukraine	Score
Women +70 kg	Oula Dahouk	00 – 10	Yelyzaveta Kalanina	0 – 1
Men +90 kg	Adnan Khankan	00 (yellow card) – 11	Oleksandr Gordiienko	0 – 2
Women –57 kg	Sanda Aldass	00 – 10	Mariia Skora	0 – 3
Men –73 kg	Ahmad Alikaj	00 – 10	Artem Khomula	0 – 4
Women –70 kg	Muna Dahouk	—	Nataliia Chystiakova	—
Men –90 kg	Tareq Jamal	—	Stanislav Gunchenko	—

==== Russian Judo Federation vs Mongolia ====
Weight Class	Russian Judo Federation	Result	Mongolia	Score
Women +70 kg	Daria Vladimirova	10 – 00	Amarsaikhany Adiyaasüren	1 – 0
Men +90 kg	Alen Tskhovrebov	10 – 00	Batkhuyagiin Gonchigsüren	2 – 0
Women –57 kg	Anastasiia Konkina	10 – 00 (yellow card)	Dorjsürengiin Sumiyaa	3 – 0
Men –73 kg	Ayub Khazhaliev	10 – 00	Tsend-Ochiryn Tsogtbaatar	4 – 0
Women –70 kg	Dali Liluashvili	—	Boldyn Gankhaich	—
Men –90 kg	Khusen Khalmurzaev	—	Gantulgyn Altanbagana	—

==== Germany vs South Korea ====
Weight Class	Germany	Result	South Korea	Score
Women +70 kg	Renée Lucht	00 – 10	Kim Ha-yun	0 – 1
Men +90 kg	Jonas Schreiber	00 (yellow card) – 10 (yellow card)	Kim Sung-min	0 – 2
Women –57 kg	Amelie Stoll	00 – 10 (yellow card)	Kim Jan-di	0–3
Men –73 kg	Schamil Dzavbatyrov	10 – 00	Ahn Joon-sung	1 – 3
Women –70 kg	Marlene Galandi	10 – 00	Han Hee-ju	2 – 3
Men –90 kg	Falk Petersilka	10 – 00	Han Ju-yeop	3 – 3
Women –57 kg	Amelie Stoll	00 – 01	Kim Jan-di	3 – 4

==== Brazil vs Kazakhstan ====
Weight Class	Brazil	Result	Kazakhstan	Score
Women +70 kg	Maria Suelen Altheman	10 – 00	Kamila Berlikash	1 – 0
Men +90 kg	David Moura	10 (yellow card) – 00	Yerassyl Kazhibayev	2 – 0
Women –57 kg	Ketelyn Nascimento	01 (yellow card) – 00 (yellow card)	Sevara Nishanbayeva	3 – 0
Men –73 kg	Eduardo Barbosa	00 – 01 (yellow card)	Angsarbek Gainullin	3 – 1
Women –70 kg	Maria Portela	00 – 01	Moldir Narynova	3 – 2
Men –90 kg	Eduardo Yudy Santos	00 (yellow card) – 01 (yellow card)	Yersultan Muzapparov	3 – 3
Women –70 kg	Maria Portela	10 (yellow card) – 00	Moldir Narynova	4 – 3

==== Hungary vs Uzbekistan ====
Weight Class	Hungary	Result	Uzbekistan	Score
Women +70 kg	Mercédesz Szigetvári	10 – 00	Iriskhon Kurbanbaeva	1 – 0
Men +90 kg	Richárd Sipőcz	01 – 00	Muzaffarbek Turoboyev	2 – 0
Women –57 kg	Andrea Kármán	00 – 01	Shukurjon Aminova	2 – 1
Men –73 kg	Frigyes Szabó	00 – 01	Obidkhon Nomonov	2 – 2
Women –70 kg	Szabina Gercsák	00 (yellow card) – 01 (yellow card)	Gulnoza Matniyazova	2 – 3
Men –90 kg	Péter Sáfrány	00 (yellow card) – 01	Shermukhammad Jandreev	2 – 4

==== France vs Netherlands ====
Weight Class	France	Result	Netherlands	Score
Women +70 kg	Léa Fontaine	10 (yellow card) – 00	Karen Stevenson	1 – 0
Men +90 kg	Cyrille Maret	11 – 00 (yellow card)	Jur Spijkers	2 – 0
Women –57 kg	Gaëtane Deberdt	01 – 00	Pleuni Cornelisse	3 – 0
Men –73 kg	Joan-Benjamin Gaba	01 – 00 (yellow card)	Yannick van der Kolk	4 – 0
Women –70 kg	Marie-Ève Gahié	—	Hilde Jager	—
Men –90 kg	Alexis Mathieu	—	Jesper Smink	—

==== Cuba vs Georgia ====
Weight Class	Cuba	Result	Georgia	Score
Women +70 kg	Idalys Ortiz	10 – 00	Sophio Somkhishvili	1 – 0
Men +90 kg	Andy Granda	00 – 01 (yellow card)	Gela Zaalishvili	1 – 1
Women –57 kg	Arnaes Odelín	00 (yellow card) – 01 (yellow card)	Eteri Liparteliani	1 – 2
Men –73 kg	Magdiel Estrada	00 – 01	Nugzar Tatalashvili	1 – 3
Women –70 kg	Maylín del Toro	00 – 01	Mariam Tchanturia	1 – 4
Men –90 kg	Iván Felipe Silva Morales	—	Lasha Bekauri	—

=== Quarterfinals ===
==== Japan vs Ukraine ====
Weight Class	Japan	Result	Ukraine	Score
Men +90 kg	Sato Kazuya	01 – 00 (yellow card)	Oleksandr Gordiienko	1 – 0
Women –57 kg	Haruka Funakubo	10 – 00 (yellow card)	Mariia Skora	2 – 0
Men –73 kg	Kenshi Harada	10 (yellow card) – 01	Oleksandr Koshliak	3 – 0
Women –70 kg	Saki Niizoe	10 – 00 (yellow card)	Nataliia Chystiakova	4 – 0
Men –90 kg	Kosuke Mashiyama	—	Stanislav Gunchenko	—
Women +70 kg	Maya Segawa	—	Vasylyna Kyrychenko	—

==== Russian Judo Federation vs South Korea ====
Weight Class	Russian Judo Federation	Result	South Korea	Score
Men +90 kg	Alen Tskhovrebov	10 – 00	Kim Sung-min	1 – 0
Women –57 kg	Yulia Kazarina	10 (yellow card) – 00	Kim Jan-di	2 – 0
Men –73 kg	Denis Iartsev	10 – 00	Ahn Joon-sung	3 – 0
Women –70 kg	Dali Liluashvili	01 – 00 (yellow card)	Han Hee-ju	4 – 0
Men –90 kg	Khusen Khalmurzaev	—	Han Ju-yeop	—
Women +70 kg	Daria Vladimirova	—	Kim Ha-yun	—

==== Brazil vs Uzbekistan ====
Weight Class	Brazil	Result	Uzbekistan	Score
Men +90 kg	David Moura	00 (yellow card) – 10	Muzaffarbek Turoboyev	0 – 1
Women –57 kg	Ketelyn Nascimento	00 – 10	Shukurjon Aminova	0 – 2
Men –73 kg	Eduardo Barbosa	00 – 10	Obidkhon Nomonov	0 – 3
Women –70 kg	Maria Portela	00 – 10	Gulnoza Matniyazova	0 – 4
Men –90 kg	Rafael Macedo	—	Shermukhammad Jandreev	—
Women +70 kg	Beatriz Souza	—	Rinata Ilmatova	—

==== France vs Georgia ====
Weight Class	France	Result	Georgia	Score
Men +90 kg	Cédric Olivar	10 – 00	Lasha Bekauri	1 – 0
Women –57 kg	Gaëtane Deberdt	00 – 10 (yellow card)	Eteri Liparteliani	1 – 1
Men –73 kg	Joan-Benjamin Gaba	00 – 10 (yellow card)	Nugzar Tatalashvili	1 – 2
Women –70 kg	Marie-Ève Gahié	11 – 00	Mariam Tchanturia	2 – 2
Men –90 kg	Francis Damier	00 (yellow card) – 11	Avtandil Tchrikishvili	2 – 3
Women +70 kg	Léa Fontaine	10 – 00	Sophio Somkhishvili	3 – 3
Men –90 kg	Francis Damier	01 – 00	Avtandil Tchrikishvili	4 – 3

=== Semifinals ===
==== Japan vs Russian Judo Federation ====
Weight Class	Japan	Result	Russian Judo Federation	Score
Women –57 kg	Haruka Funakubo	10 – 00 (yellow card)	Yulia Kazarina	1 – 0
Men –73 kg	Kenshi Harada	10 – 00 (yellow card)	Ayub Khazhaliev	2 – 0
Women –70 kg	Saki Niizoe	01 – 00 (yellow card)	Taisia Kireeva	3 – 0
Men –90 kg	Kosuke Mashiyama	10 – 00	Mansur Lorsanov	4 – 0
Women +70 kg	Maya Segawa	—	Antonina Shmeleva	—
Men +90 kg	Sato Kazuya	—	Alen Tskhovrebov	—

==== Uzbekistan vs France ====
Weight Class	Uzbekistan	Result	France	Score
Women –57 kg	Shukurjon Aminova	00 – 10	Gaëtane Deberdt	0 – 1
Men –73 kg	Obidkhon Nomonov	01 – 00 (yellow card)	Joan-Benjamin Gaba	1 – 1
Women –70 kg	Gulnoza Matniyazova	00 (yellow card) – 10	Marie-Ève Gahié	1 – 2
Men –90 kg	Shermukhammad Jandreev	00 (yellow card) – 01	Francis Damier	1 – 3
Women +70 kg	Rinata Ilmatova	00 – 10	Léa Fontaine	1 – 4
Men +90 kg	Muzaffarbek Turoboyev	—	Cédric Olivar	—

=== Repechage ===
==== Ukraine vs South Korea ====
Weight Class	Ukraine	Result	South Korea	Score
Women –57 kg	Mariia Skora	01 (yellow card) – 00	Jeong Bo-kyeong	1 – 0
Men –73 kg	Artem Khomula	00 – 01 (yellow card)	Ahn Joon-sung	1 – 1
Women –70 kg	Nataliia Chystiakova	01 – 10 (yellow card)	Han Hee-ju	1 – 2
Men –90 kg	Quedjau Nhabali	00 – 01	Han Ju-yeop	1 – 3
Women +70 kg	Yelyzaveta Kalanina	01 – 00	Kim Ha-yun	2 – 3
Men +90 kg	Iakiv Khammo	10 – 00	Kim Sung-min	3 – 3
Men +90 kg	Iakiv Khammo	00 – 01	Kim Sung-min	3 – 4

==== Brazil vs Georgia ====
Weight Class	Brazil	Result	Georgia	Score
Women –57 kg	Ketelyn Nascimento	01 (yellow card) – 00	Eteri Liparteliani	1 – 0
Men –73 kg	Eduardo Barbosa	00 – 10	Nugzar Tatalashvili	1 – 1
Women –70 kg	Maria Portela	10 – 00	Mariam Tchanturia	2 – 1
Men –90 kg	Rafael Macedo	10 – 00	Avtandil Tchrikishvili	3 – 1
Women +70 kg	Beatriz Souza	10 – 00	Sophio Somkhishvili	4 – 1
Men +90 kg	David Moura	—	Gela Zaalishvili	—

=== Third place ===
==== South Korea vs Uzbekistan ====
Weight Class	South Korea	Result	Uzbekistan	Score
Men –73 kg	Ahn Joon-sung	00 – 01	Obidkhon Nomonov	0 – 1
Women –70 kg	Han Hee-ju	00 – 10	Gulnoza Matniyazova	0 – 2
Men –90 kg	Han Ju-yeop	00 (yellow card) – 01	Shermukhammad Jandreev	0 – 3
Women +70 kg	Kim Ha-yun	10 (yellow card) – 00 (yellow card)	Iriskhon Kurbanbaeva	1 – 3
Men +90 kg	Won Jong-hoon	00 – 10	Muzaffarbek Turoboyev	1 – 4
Women –57 kg	Kim Jan-di	—	Shukurjon Aminova	—

==== Brazil vs Russian Judo Federation ====
Weight Class	Brazil	Result	Russian Judo Federation	Score
Men –73 kg	Eduardo Barbosa	00 – 10 (yellow card)	Denis Yartsev	0 – 1
Women –70 kg	Maria Portela	01 – 00	Dali Liluashvili	1 – 1
Men –90 kg	Rafael Macedo	00 – 10 (yellow card)	Khusen Khalmurzaev	1 – 2
Women +70 kg	Beatriz Souza	10 – 00 (yellow card)	Daria Vladimirova	2 – 2
Men +90 kg	David Moura	11 (yellow card) – 00 (yellow card)	Alen Tskhovrebov	3 – 2
Women –57 kg	Ketelyn Nascimento	10 (yellow card) – 00	Anastasia Konkina	4 – 2

=== Final ===
Weight Class	Japan	Result	France	Score
Men –73 kg	Soichi Hashimoto	10 – 00	Joan-Benjamin Gaba	1 – 0
Women –70 kg	Saki Niizoe	10 – 00	Marie-Ève Gahié	2 – 0
Men –90 kg	Kenta Nagasawa	01 – 00	Francis Damier	3 – 0
Women +70 kg	Maya Segawa	10 (yellow card) – 00	Léa Fontaine	4 – 0
Men +90 kg	Kokoro Kageura	—	Cédric Olivar	—
Women –57 kg	Haruka Funakubo	—	Gaëtane Deberdt	—

== Prize money ==
The sums listed bring the total prizes awarded to 200,000€ for the event.

Medal	Total	Judoka	Coach
Gold	90,000€	72,000€	18,000€
Silver	60,000€	48,000€	12,000€
Bronze	25,000€	20,000€	5,000€
