= Kazuya Sato =

Japanese judoka (born 1995)

Personal information
- Born: 6 April 1995 (age 31)
- Occupation: Judoka

Sport
- Country: Japan
- Sport: Judo
- Weight class: +100 kg
Medal record
Men's judo
Representing Japan
World Championships
| Gold medal – first place | 2021 Budapest | Mixed team |
World Juniors Championships
| Bronze medal – third place | 2013 Ljubljana | Mixed team |
Asian Junior Championships
| Gold medal – first place | 2014 Hong Kong | +100 kg |

Profile at external databases
- IJF: 14814
- JudoInside.com: 35781
- Updated on 15 August 2022

Kazuya Sato (born 6 April 1995) is a Japanese judoka.

Sato won a medal at the 2021 World Judo Championships.
