= Eduardo Barbosa (judoka) =

Brazilian judoka (born 1991)

Personal information
- Born: 16 November 1991 (age 34) Registro, Brazil
- Occupation: Judoka

Sport
- Country: Brazil
- Sport: Judo
- Weight class: ‍–‍73 kg

Achievements and titles
- Olympic Games: R64 (2020)
- World Champ.: R32 (2021)
- Pan American Champ.: (2017)
Medal record
Men's judo
Representing Brazil
World Championships
Bronze medal – third place	2019 Tokyo	Mixed team
Bronze medal – third place	2021 Budapest	Mixed team
Pan American Championships
Gold medal – first place	2017 Panama City	‍–‍73 kg
Silver medal – second place	2020 Guadalajara	‍–‍73 kg
IJF Grand Prix
Bronze medal – third place	2013 Qingdao	‍–‍73 kg
Bronze medal – third place	2017 Zagreb	‍–‍73 kg

Profile at external databases
- IJF: 14564
- JudoInside.com: 89430
- Updated on 7 December 2022

Eduardo Katsuhiro Barbosa (born 16 November 1991) is a Brazilian judoka.

Barbosa won a medal at the 2019 World Judo Championships.

Barbosa represented Brazil at the 2020 Summer Olympics.
