= Maya Akiba =

Japanese judoka (born 1997)

Personal information
- Born: Maya Akiba; 1 January 1997 (age 29)
- Occupation: Judoka

Sport
- Country: Japan
- Sport: Judo
- Weight class: +78 kg
Medal record
Women's judo
Representing Japan
World Championships
Gold medal – first place	2021 Budapest	Mixed team
IJF Grand Slam
Silver medal – second place	2022 Tokyo	+78 kg
Silver medal – second place	2023 Paris	+78 kg
Bronze medal – third place	2024 Tashkent	+78 kg
IJF Grand Prix
Silver medal – second place	2019 Hohhot	+78 kg
Summer Universiade
Gold medal – first place	2019 Naples	Open
Gold medal – first place	2019 Naples	Women's team
Silver medal – second place	2019 Naples	+70 kg

Profile at external databases
- IJF: 49249
- JudoInside.com: 108915, 161625
- Updated on 4 March 2024

Maya Segawa (née Akiba; 1 January 1997) is a Japanese judoka.

Segawa won a medal at the mixed team event in the 2021 World Judo Championships.
