= 2021 Judo Grand Slam Paris =

Judo competition

Judo 2021 Judo Grand Slam Paris
- Venue: Accor Arena
- Location: Paris, France
- Dates: 16–17 October 2021
- Competitors: 281 from 45 nations
- Total prize money: 154,000€

Competition at external databases
- Links: IJF • EJU • JudoInside

The 2021 Judo Grand Slam Paris was to be held at the Accor Arena in Paris, France, from 8–9 May 2021, but postponed to 16–17 October 2021.

== Event videos ==
The event was aired freely on the IJF YouTube channel.

	Weight classes	Preliminaries				Final Block
Day 1	Men: -60, -66, -73 Women: -48, -52, -57, -63	Commentated: English, French				Tatami 2
Day 1	Men: -60, -66, -73 Women: -48, -52, -57, -63	Tatami 1	Tatami 2	Tatami 3	Tatami 4	Tatami 3
Day 2	Men: -81, -90, -100, +100 Women: -70, -78, +78	Commentated: English, French				Tatami 2
Day 2	Men: -81, -90, -100, +100 Women: -70, -78, +78	Tatami 1	Tatami 2	Tatami 3	Tatami 4	Tatami 3

== Medal summary ==
=== Men's events ===
Event	Gold	Silver	Bronze
Extra-lightweight (−60 kg)	Balabay Aghayev (AZE)	Ramazan Abdulaev (RUS)	Enkhtaivany Ariunbold (MGL)
Extra-lightweight (−60 kg)	Balabay Aghayev (AZE)	Ramazan Abdulaev (RUS)	Romain Valadier-Picard (FRA)
Half-lightweight (−66 kg)	Ryoma Tanaka (JPN)	Taikoh Fujisaka (JPN)	Walide Khyar (FRA)
Half-lightweight (−66 kg)	Ryoma Tanaka (JPN)	Taikoh Fujisaka (JPN)	Orlando Cazorla (FRA)
Lightweight (−73 kg)	Kenshi Harada (JPN)	Théo Riquin (FRA)	Alexandru Raicu (ROU)
Lightweight (−73 kg)	Kenshi Harada (JPN)	Théo Riquin (FRA)	Hidayat Heydarov (AZE)
Half-middleweight (−81 kg)	Takeshi Sasaki (JPN)	Tato Grigalashvili (GEO)	Sotaro Fujiwara (JPN)
Half-middleweight (−81 kg)	Takeshi Sasaki (JPN)	Tato Grigalashvili (GEO)	Gereltuyaagiin Bolor-Ochir (MGL)
Middleweight (−90 kg)	Kenta Nagasawa (JPN)	Khusen Khalmurzaev (RUS)	Anri Egutidze (POR)
Middleweight (−90 kg)	Kenta Nagasawa (JPN)	Khusen Khalmurzaev (RUS)	Luka Maisuradze (GEO)
Half-heavyweight (−100 kg)	Arman Adamian (RUS)	Asley González (ROU)	Simeon Catharina (NED)
Half-heavyweight (−100 kg)	Arman Adamian (RUS)	Asley González (ROU)	Onise Saneblidze (GEO)
Heavyweight (+100 kg)	Inal Tasoev (RUS)	Cyrille Maret (FRA)	Joseph Terhec (FRA)
Heavyweight (+100 kg)	Inal Tasoev (RUS)	Cyrille Maret (FRA)	Jur Spijkers (NED)

=== Women's events ===
Event	Gold	Silver	Bronze
Extra-lightweight (−48 kg)	Wakana Koga (JPN)	Mélanie Clément (FRA)	Blandine Pont (FRA)
Extra-lightweight (−48 kg)	Wakana Koga (JPN)	Mélanie Clément (FRA)	Shirine Boukli (FRA)
Half-lightweight (−52 kg)	Gefen Primo (ISR)	Astride Gneto (FRA)	Bishreltiin Khorloodoi (MGL)
Half-lightweight (−52 kg)	Gefen Primo (ISR)	Astride Gneto (FRA)	Mascha Ballhaus (GER)
Lightweight (−57 kg)	Haruka Funakubo (JPN)	Caroline Fritze (GER)	Eteri Liparteliani (GEO)
Lightweight (−57 kg)	Haruka Funakubo (JPN)	Caroline Fritze (GER)	Mina Libeer (BEL)
Half-middleweight (−63 kg)	Bárbara Timo (POR)	Lucy Renshall (GBR)	Angelika Szymańska (POL)
Half-middleweight (−63 kg)	Bárbara Timo (POR)	Lucy Renshall (GBR)	Manon Deketer (FRA)
Middleweight (−70 kg)	Saki Niizoe (JPN)	Barbara Matić (CRO)	Hilde Jager (NED)
Middleweight (−70 kg)	Saki Niizoe (JPN)	Barbara Matić (CRO)	Yoko Ono (JPN)
Half-heavyweight (−78 kg)	Aleksandra Babintseva (RUS)	Rika Takayama (JPN)	Inbar Lanir (ISR)
Half-heavyweight (−78 kg)	Aleksandra Babintseva (RUS)	Rika Takayama (JPN)	Luise Malzahn (GER)
Heavyweight (+78 kg)	Raz Hershko (ISR)	Léa Fontaine (FRA)	Julia Tolofua (FRA)
Heavyweight (+78 kg)	Raz Hershko (ISR)	Léa Fontaine (FRA)	Coralie Hayme (FRA)

Source Results

=== Medal table ===
* Host nation (France)

Rank	Nation	Gold	Silver	Bronze	Total
1	Japan (JPN)	7	2	2	11
2	Russia (RUS)	3	2	0	5
3	Israel (ISR)	2	0	1	3
4	Azerbaijan (AZE)	1	0	1	2
4	Portugal (POR)	1	0	1	2
6	France (FRA)*	0	5	9	14
7	Georgia (GEO)	0	1	3	4
8	Germany (GER)	0	1	2	3
9	Romania (ROU)	0	1	1	2
10	Croatia (CRO)	0	1	0	1
10	Great Britain (GBR)	0	1	0	1
12	Mongolia (MGL)	0	0	3	3
12	Netherlands (NED)	0	0	3	3
14	Belgium (BEL)	0	0	1	1
14	Poland (POL)	0	0	1	1
Totals (15 entries)		14	14	28	56

== Prize money ==
The sums written are per medalist, bringing the total prizes awarded to 154,000€. (retrieved from:)

Medal	Total	Judoka	Coach
Gold	5,000€	4,000€	1,000€
Silver	3,000€	2,400€	600€
Bronze	1,500€	1,200€	300€
