= Gaëtane Deberdt =

French judoka (born 1998)

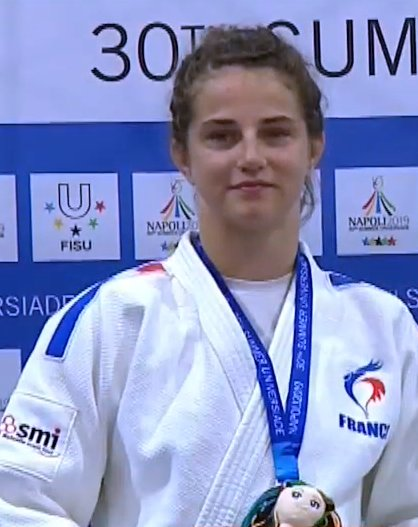

Personal information
- Born: 19 September 1998 (age 27)
- Occupation: Judoka

Sport
- Country: France
- Sport: Judo
- Weight class: ‍–‍57 kg, ‍–‍63 kg
Medal record
Women's judo
Representing France
World Championships
Silver medal – second place	2021 Budapest	Mixed team
IJF Grand Slam
Bronze medal – third place	2025 Ulaanbaatar	‍–‍63 kg
European U23 Championships
Silver medal – second place	2020 Poreč	‍–‍57 kg
Summer Universiade
Silver medal – second place	2019 Naples	‍–‍57 kg

Profile at external databases
- IJF: 32939
- JudoInside.com: 63589
- Updated on 29 July 2025

Gaëtane Deberdt (born 19 September 1998) is a French judoka.

Deberdt won a medal at the mixed team event of the 2021 World Judo Championships.
