= Francis Damier =

French judoka (born 2001)

Personal information
- Nationality: French
- Born: 24 December 2001 (age 24)
- Occupation: Judoka

Sport
- Country: France
- Sport: Judo
- Weight class: ‍–‍90 kg
Medal record
Men's judo
Representing France
World Championships
Silver medal – second place	2021 Budapest	Mixed team
World Juniors Championships
Gold medal – first place	2021 Olbia	Mixed team
Bronze medal – third place	2019 Marrakech	Mixed team
European Junior Championships
Gold medal – first place	2020 Poreč	‍–‍90 kg
Mediterranean Games
Silver medal – second place	2026 Taranto	Mixed team
Bronze medal – third place	2026 Taranto	‍–‍100 kg

Profile at external databases
- IJF: 39041
- JudoInside.com: 111140
- Updated on 1 September 2026

Francis Damier (born 24 December 2001) is a French judoka.

He won a medal at the 2021 World Judo Championships.
