= Lee Jeong-yun =

South Korean judoka (born 1996)

Personal information
- Born: September 17, 1996 (age 29)
- Occupation: Judoka

Sport
- Country: South Korea
- Sport: Judo
- Weight class: ‍–‍78 kg

Achievements and titles
- World Champ.: 5th (2024)
- Asian Champ.: (silver) (2022)
Medal record
Women's judo
Representing South Korea
Asian Championships
Silver medal – second place	2022 Nur‑Sultan	‍–‍78 kg
Bronze medal – third place	2017 Hong Kong	‍–‍78 kg
Bronze medal – third place	2019 Fujairah	‍–‍78 kg
Bronze medal – third place	2021 Bishkek	‍–‍78 kg
IJF Grand Slam
Bronze medal – third place	2021 Tashkent	‍–‍78 kg
Bronze medal – third place	2022 Paris	‍–‍78 kg
Bronze medal – third place	2023 Paris	‍–‍78 kg
IJF Grand Prix
Bronze medal – third place	2017 Hohhot	‍–‍78 kg
Bronze medal – third place	2022 Almada	‍–‍78 kg
Bronze medal – third place	2023 Perth	‍–‍78 kg
Summer Universiade
Silver medal – second place	2017 Taipei	‍–‍78 kg
Silver medal – second place	2017 Taipei	Women's team

Profile at external databases
- IJF: 17785
- JudoInside.com: 93592
- Updated on 22 May 2024

Lee Jeong-yun (born 17 September 1996) is a South Korean judoka.

In 2017, she won one of the bronze medals in the women's 78 kg event at the Asian Judo Championships held in Hong Kong. In that same year, she also won the silver medal in her event at the 2017 Summer Universiade held in Taipei, Taiwan.

At the 2019 Asian-Pacific Judo Championships held in Fujairah, United Arab Emirates, she won one of the bronze medals in the women's 78 kg event.

In 2021, she won one of the bronze medals in her event at the Judo Grand Slam Tashkent held in Tashkent, Uzbekistan. In 2022, she won one of the bronze medals in her event at the Judo Grand Prix Almada held in Almada, Portugal. She also won one of the bronze medals in her event at the 2022 Judo Grand Slam Paris held in Paris, France.
