= Ketelyn Nascimento =

Brazilian judoka (born 1998)

Personal information
- Born: 12 June 1998 (age 28)
- Occupation: Judoka

Sport
- Country: Brazil
- Sport: Judo
- Weight class: ‍–‍57 kg

Achievements and titles
- World Champ.: R32 (2021)
- Pan American Champ.: (2021)
Medal record
Women's judo
Representing Brazil
World Championships
Bronze medal – third place	2021 Budapest	Mixed team
Pan American Championships
Silver medal – second place	2021 Guadalajara	‍–‍57 kg
IJF Grand Slam
Silver medal – second place	2019 Brasilia	‍–‍57 kg
World Juniors Championships
Bronze medal – third place	2018 Nassau	Mixed team
Pan American Junior Championships
Gold medal – first place	2018 La Paz	‍–‍57 kg
Bronze medal – third place	2017 Cancún	‍–‍57 kg

Profile at external databases
- IJF: 26125
- JudoInside.com: 38304
- Updated on 21 November 2022

Ketelyn Nascimento (born 12 June 1998) is a Brazilian judoka.

Nascimento won a medal at the 2021 World Judo Championships.
