= Cédric Olivar =

French judoka (born 1995)

Personal information
- Born: 6 December 1995 (age 30)
- Occupation: Judoka

Sport
- Country: France
- Sport: Judo
- Weight class: ‍–‍100 kg

Achievements and titles
- European Champ.: R32 (2020, 2022)
Medal record
Men's judo
Representing France
World Championships
Silver medal – second place	2021 Budapest	Mixed team

Profile at external databases
- IJF: 22683
- JudoInside.com: 27698
- Updated on 27 December 2023

Cédric Olivar (born 6 December 1995) is a French judoka.

Olivar won a medal at the 2021 World Judo Championships.
