= Obidkhon Nomonov =

Uzbekistani judoka (born 1998)

Personal information
- Born: 5 May 1998 (age 28)
- Occupation: Judoka

Sport
- Country: Uzbekistan
- Sport: Judo
- Weight class: ‍–‍73 kg

Achievements and titles
- World Champ.: 7th (2023)
- Asian Champ.: (bronze) (2022)
Medal record
Men's judo
Representing Uzbekistan
World Championships
| Bronze medal – third place | 2021 Budapest | Mixed team |
Asian Championships
| Bronze medal – third place | 2022 Nur‑Sultan | ‍–‍73 kg |
IJF Grand Slam
| Silver medal – second place | 2022 Tel Aviv | ‍–‍73 kg |
| Silver medal – second place | 2023 Tbilisi | ‍–‍73 kg |
| Bronze medal – third place | 2022 Ulaanbaatar | ‍–‍73 kg |
| Bronze medal – third place | 2024 Tashkent | ‍–‍73 kg |
IJF Grand Prix
| Gold medal – first place | 2023 Almada | ‍–‍73 kg |
Asian Junior Championships
| Bronze medal – third place | 2018 Beirut | ‍–‍73 kg |

Profile at external databases
- IJF: 32478
- JudoInside.com: 106627
- Updated on 3 March 2024

Obidkhon Nomonov (born 5 May 1998) is an Uzbekistani judoka.

He won a medal at the 2021 World Judo Championships.

He won the silver medal in his event at the 2022 Judo Grand Slam Tel Aviv held in Tel Aviv, Israel.
