= Haruka Funakubo =

Japanese judoka (born 1998)

Personal information
- Born: 10 October 1998 (age 27) Fujiyoshida, Japan
- Occupation: Judoka

Sport
- Country: Japan
- Sport: Judo
- Weight class: ‍–‍57 kg

Achievements and titles
- Olympic Games: (bronze) (2024)
- World Champ.: (silver) (2022, 2023)
Medal record
Women's judo
Representing Japan
Olympic Games
Silver medal – second place	2024 Paris	Mixed team
Bronze medal – third place	2024 Paris	‍–‍57 kg
World Championships
Gold medal – first place	2021 Budapest	Mixed team
Gold medal – first place	2022 Tashkent	Mixed team
Gold medal – first place	2023 Doha	Mixed team
Silver medal – second place	2022 Tashkent	‍–‍57 kg
Silver medal – second place	2023 Doha	‍–‍57 kg
Asian Games
Gold medal – first place	2018 Jakarta	Mixed team
World Masters
Bronze medal – third place	2023 Budapest	‍–‍57 kg
IJF Grand Slam
Gold medal – first place	2021 Paris	‍–‍57 kg
Gold medal – first place	2022 Paris	‍–‍57 kg
Gold medal – first place	2022 Budapest	‍–‍57 kg
Gold medal – first place	2022 Tokyo	‍–‍57 kg
Gold medal – first place	2026 Budapest	‍–‍57 kg
Silver medal – second place	2024 Tashkent	‍–‍57 kg
Bronze medal – third place	2018 Osaka	‍–‍57 kg
Bronze medal – third place	2019 Ekaterinburg	‍–‍57 kg
Bronze medal – third place	2023 Paris	‍–‍57 kg
Bronze medal – third place	2024 Astana	‍–‍57 kg
IJF Grand Prix
Bronze medal – third place	2018 Zagreb	‍–‍57 kg
World Juniors Championships
Gold medal – first place	2015 Abu Dhabi	‍–‍57 kg
Gold medal – first place	2017 Zagreb	‍–‍57 kg
Gold medal – first place	2018 Nassau	‍–‍57 kg
Asian Cadet Championships
Gold medal – first place	2014 Hong Kong	‍–‍57 kg

Profile at external databases
- IJF: 28260
- JudoInside.com: 94060
- Updated on 13 September 2026

Haruka Funakubo (舟久保 遥香, Funakubo Haruka; born 10 October 1998 in Fujiyoshida, Yamanashi) is a Japanese judoka.

== Judo career ==
Funakubo started Judo at the age of 6. In April 2011, she went on to Fujigakuen Junior High School where she was under the instruction of Yuta Yazaki and his wife Noriko Yazaki. Yuta is a former Asian Games champion as well as a Newaza specialist. Noriko is a former national champion. They both participated at the 2003 World Judo Championships. In August 2013, she won all bouts for Ippon at the National Junior High School Championships.

In April 2014, she went on to Fujigakuen High School. She won the Inter-High School Championships and the All-Japan Junior Championships 2 times in a row respectively in 2015, 2016. In October 2015, she won the World Judo Championships Juniors both individual (–57 kg weight class) and team event. She won 5 out of 8 bouts with Funakubo-Gatame for Ippon.

In 2017, she became a member of the Judo club at the Mitsui Sumitomo Insurance Group. In February 2017, she won all bouts with Funakubo-Gatame for Ippon at the European Open Sofia.

In April 2017, she became vice champion at the All-Japan weight championships. In October 2017, she retained the world junior title as well as the team title.

In September 2018, she won the Asian Games team event. In October 2018, she won the world junior title as well as the team title three times in a row.

In April 2021, she won the All-Japan Selected Judo Championships. In June 2021, she won the 2021 World Judo Championships – Mixed team. In October 2021, she won the 2021 Judo Grand Slam Paris.

In February 2022, she won the 2022 Judo Grand Slam Paris. In April 2022, she won the All-Japan Selected Judo Championships.

== Funakubo-Gatame ==
Funakuo's favorite technique is Newaza, especially Osaekomi-waza called Funakubo-Gatame. Funakubo-Gatame is considered a modified Hara-Zutsumi (stomach wrap grabbing) technique. Hara-Zutsumi originates from Nanatei Judo This is officially classified as Kuzure-Kesa-Gatame or Kata-Gatame. When she was in the second grade at junior high school, she couldn't practice Judo because of a knee injury. Thus she was doing 1000 Pull‐ups every day for a month. After the recovery, she invented Funakubo-Gatame to turn over an opponent in a prone position.

Some in the media say Funakubo looks like the actress Rena Nōnen.
