= 2021 World Judo Championships =

Judo competition

Judo 2021 World Judo Championships
- Venue: László Papp Budapest Sports Arena
- Location: Budapest, Hungary
- Dates: 6–13 June
- Competitors: 661 from 118 nations
- Total prize money: 998,000€
- Website: Official website

Champions
- Mixed team: Japan (4th title)

Competition at external databases
- Links: IJF • JudoInside

The 2021 World Judo Championships were held from 6 to 13 June 2021 in Budapest, Hungary.

== Schedule ==
All times are local (UTC+2).

The event will air freely on the IJF YouTube channel.

Day	Date	Weight classes		Preliminaries				Final Block	
Day	Date	Men	Women	Start time	Preliminaries Links			Start time	Finals link
1	6 June	60 kg	48 kg	10:00	Tatami 1	Tatami 2	Tatami 3	17:00	Finals
2	7 June	66 kg	52 kg	10:00	Tatami 1	Tatami 2	Tatami 3	17:00	Finals
3	8 June	73 kg	57 kg	10:00	Tatami 1	Tatami 2	Tatami 3	17:00	Finals
4	9 June	81 kg	63 kg	10:00	Tatami 1	Tatami 2	Tatami 3	17:00	Finals
5	10 June	90 kg	70 kg	10:00	Tatami 1	Tatami 2	Tatami 3	17:00	Finals
6	11 June	100 kg	78 kg	10:00	Tatami 1	Tatami 2	Tatami 3	17:00	Finals
7	12 June	+100 kg	+78 kg	10:00	Tatami 1	Tatami 2	Tatami 3	17:00	Finals
8	13 June	Mixed team		10:00	Tatami 1	Tatami 2	Tatami 3	17:00	Finals

== Russia doping ban ==
On 9 December 2019, the World Anti-Doping Agency (WADA) banned Russia from all international sport for a period of four years, after the Russian government was found to have tampered with laboratory data that it provided to WADA in January 2019 as a condition of the Russian Anti-Doping Agency being reinstated. As a result of the ban, WADA plans to allow individually cleared Russian athletes to take part in the 2021-2022 World Championships and 2022 Winter Olympics under a neutral banner, as instigated at the 2018 Winter Olympics, but they will not be permitted to compete in team sports. The title of the neutral banner has yet to be determined; WADA Compliance Review Committee head Jonathan Taylor stated that the IOC would not be able to use "Olympic Athletes from Russia" (OAR) as it did in 2018, emphasizing that neutral athletes cannot be portrayed as representing a specific country. Russia later filed an appeal to the Court of Arbitration for Sport (CAS) against the WADA decision. The Court of Arbitration for Sport, on review of Russia's appeal of its case from WADA, ruled on December 17, 2020 to reduce the penalty that WADA had placed. Instead of banning Russia from sporting events, the ruling allowed Russia to participate at the Olympics and other international events, but for a period of two years, the team cannot use the Russian name, flag, or anthem and must present themselves as "Neutral Athlete" or "Neutral Team". The ruling does allow for team uniforms to display "Russia" on the uniform as well as the use of the Russian flag colors within the uniform's design, although the name should be up to equal predominance as the "Neutral Athlete/Team" designation.

== Medal summary ==
=== Medal table ===
* Host nation (Hungary)

Rank	Nation	Gold	Silver	Bronze	Total
1	Japan	6	4	2	12
2	France	1	2	0	3
3	Georgia	1	1	2	4
3	Spain	1	1	2	4
5	(Russia) Russian Judo Federation	1	1	1	3
6	Germany	1	0	1	2
6	Portugal	1	0	1	2
8	Belgium	1	0	0	1
8	Canada	1	0	0	1
8	Croatia	1	0	0	1
11	Serbia	0	1	1	2
11	Sweden	0	1	1	2
11	Uzbekistan	0	1	1	2
14	Italy	0	1	0	1
14	Kazakhstan	0	1	0	1
14	Slovenia	0	1	0	1
17	Netherlands	0	0	5	5
18	Brazil	0	0	3	3
19	Mongolia	0	0	2	2
20	Austria	0	0	1	1
20	Azerbaijan	0	0	1	1
20	Hungary*	0	0	1	1
20	Israel	0	0	1	1
20	Kosovo	0	0	1	1
20	Switzerland	0	0	1	1
20	Turkey	0	0	1	1
20	Ukraine	0	0	1	1
Totals (27 entries)		15	15	30	60

=== Men's events ===
Event	Gold	Silver	Bronze
Extra-lightweight (60 kg)	Yago Abuladze (Russia) Russian Judo Federation	Gusman Kyrgyzbayev; Kazakhstan	Karamat Huseynov; Azerbaijan
Extra-lightweight (60 kg)	Yago Abuladze (Russia) Russian Judo Federation	Gusman Kyrgyzbayev; Kazakhstan	Francisco Garrigós; Spain
Half-lightweight (66 kg)	Joshiro Maruyama; Japan	Manuel Lombardo; Italy	Yakub Shamilov (Russia) Russian Judo Federation
Half-lightweight (66 kg)	Joshiro Maruyama; Japan	Manuel Lombardo; Italy	Baskhuu Yondonperenlei; Mongolia
Lightweight (73 kg)	Lasha Shavdatuashvili; Georgia	Tommy Macias; Sweden	Bilal Çiloğlu; Turkey
Lightweight (73 kg)	Lasha Shavdatuashvili; Georgia	Tommy Macias; Sweden	Soichi Hashimoto; Japan
Half-middleweight (81 kg)	Matthias Casse; Belgium	Tato Grigalashvili; Georgia	Frank de Wit; Netherlands
Half-middleweight (81 kg)	Matthias Casse; Belgium	Tato Grigalashvili; Georgia	Anri Egutidze; Portugal
Middleweight (90 kg)	Nikoloz Sherazadishvili; Spain	Davlat Bobonov; Uzbekistan	Krisztián Tóth; Hungary
Middleweight (90 kg)	Nikoloz Sherazadishvili; Spain	Davlat Bobonov; Uzbekistan	Marcus Nyman; Sweden
Half-heavyweight (100 kg)	Jorge Fonseca; Portugal	Aleksandar Kukolj; Serbia	Varlam Liparteliani; Georgia
Half-heavyweight (100 kg)	Jorge Fonseca; Portugal	Aleksandar Kukolj; Serbia	Ilia Sulamanidze; Georgia
Heavyweight (+100 kg)	Kokoro Kageura; Japan	Tamerlan Bashaev (Russia) Russian Judo Federation	Roy Meyer; Netherlands
Heavyweight (+100 kg)	Kokoro Kageura; Japan	Tamerlan Bashaev (Russia) Russian Judo Federation	Iakiv Khammo; Ukraine

=== Women's events ===
Event	Gold	Silver	Bronze
Extra-lightweight (48 kg)	Natsumi Tsunoda; Japan	Wakana Koga; Japan	Julia Figueroa; Spain
Extra-lightweight (48 kg)	Natsumi Tsunoda; Japan	Wakana Koga; Japan	Mönkhbatyn Urantsetseg; Mongolia
Half-lightweight (52 kg)	Ai Shishime; Japan	Ana Perez Box; Spain	Fabienne Kocher; Switzerland
Half-lightweight (52 kg)	Ai Shishime; Japan	Ana Perez Box; Spain	Gefen Primo; Israel
Lightweight (57 kg)	Jessica Klimkait; Canada	Momo Tamaoki; Japan	Nora Gjakova; Kosovo
Lightweight (57 kg)	Jessica Klimkait; Canada	Momo Tamaoki; Japan	Theresa Stoll; Germany
Half-middleweight (63 kg)	Clarisse Agbegnenou; France	Andreja Leški; Slovenia	Anja Obradović; Serbia
Half-middleweight (63 kg)	Clarisse Agbegnenou; France	Andreja Leški; Slovenia	Sanne Vermeer; Netherlands
Middleweight (70 kg)	Barbara Matić; Croatia	Yoko Ono; Japan	Sanne van Dijke; Netherlands
Middleweight (70 kg)	Barbara Matić; Croatia	Yoko Ono; Japan	Michaela Polleres; Austria
Half-heavyweight (78 kg)	Anna-Maria Wagner; Germany	Madeleine Malonga; France	Mami Umeki; Japan
Half-heavyweight (78 kg)	Anna-Maria Wagner; Germany	Madeleine Malonga; France	Guusje Steenhuis; Netherlands
Heavyweight (+78 kg)	Sarah Asahina; Japan	Wakaba Tomita; Japan	Beatriz Souza; Brazil
Heavyweight (+78 kg)	Sarah Asahina; Japan	Wakaba Tomita; Japan	Maria Suelen Altheman; Brazil

=== Mixed events ===
Event	Gold	Silver	Bronze
Mixed team	Japan; Maya Akiba; Haruka Funakubo; Kenshi Harada; Soichi Hashimoto; Kokoro Kageura; Kosuke Mashiyama; Kenta Nagasawa; Saki Niizoe; Yoko Ono; Kazuya Sato; Momo Tamaoki; Wakaba Tomita	France; Francis Damier; Gaëtane Deberdt; Clémence Eme; Léa Fontaine; Joan-Benjamin Gaba; Marie-Ève Gahié; Enzo Gibelli; Astride Gneto; Cyrille Maret; Alexis Mathieu; Cédric Olivar; Julia Tolofua	Uzbekistan; Shukurjon Aminova; Davlat Bobonov; Rinata Ilmatova; Shermukhammad Jandreev; Diyora Keldiyorova; Farangiz Khojieva; Iriskhon Kurbanbaeva; Gulnoza Matniyazova; Obidkhon Nomonov; Sardor Nurillaev; Bekmurod Oltiboev; Muzaffarbek Turoboyev
Mixed team	Japan; Maya Akiba; Haruka Funakubo; Kenshi Harada; Soichi Hashimoto; Kokoro Kageura; Kosuke Mashiyama; Kenta Nagasawa; Saki Niizoe; Yoko Ono; Kazuya Sato; Momo Tamaoki; Wakaba Tomita	France; Francis Damier; Gaëtane Deberdt; Clémence Eme; Léa Fontaine; Joan-Benjamin Gaba; Marie-Ève Gahié; Enzo Gibelli; Astride Gneto; Cyrille Maret; Alexis Mathieu; Cédric Olivar; Julia Tolofua	Brazil; Maria Suelen Altheman; Eduardo Barbosa; Rafael Macedo; David Moura; Ketelyn Nascimento; Larissa Pimenta; Maria Portela; Ketleyn Quadros; Eduardo Yudy Santos; Rafael Silva; Beatriz Souza; Eric Takabatake

=== Prize money ===
The sums written are per medalist, bringing the total prizes awarded to 798,000€ for the individual events and 200,000€ for the team event. (retrieved from:)

Medal	Individual			Mixed team		
Medal	Total	Judoka	Coach	Total	Judoka	Coach
Gold	26,000€	20,800€	5,200€	90,000€	72,000€	18,000€
Silver	15,000€	12,000€	3,000€	60,000€	48,000€	12,000€
Bronze	8,000€	6,400€	1,600€	25,000€	20,000€	5,000€
