= Rika Takayama =

Japanese judoka (born 1994)

Personal information
- Born: 27 August 1994 (age 32)
- Occupation: Judoka

Sport
- Country: Japan
- Sport: Judo
- Weight class: ‍–‍78 kg

Achievements and titles
- Olympic Games: 5th (2024)
- Asian Champ.: (gold) (2024)
Medal record
Women's judo
Representing Japan
Olympic Games
Silver medal – second place	2024 Paris	Mixed team
Asian Games
Silver medal – second place	2023 Hangzhou	‍–‍78 kg
Asian Championships
Gold medal – first place	2024 Hong Kong	‍–‍78 kg
Silver medal – second place	2016 Tashkent	‍–‍78 kg
IJF Grand Slam
Gold medal – first place	2016 Tyumen	‍–‍78 kg
Gold medal – first place	2018 Ekaterinburg	‍–‍78 kg
Gold medal – first place	2022 Tokyo	‍–‍78 kg
Gold medal – first place	2023 Tashkent	‍–‍78 kg
Gold medal – first place	2024 Tashkent	‍–‍78 kg
Silver medal – second place	2021 Paris	‍–‍78 kg
Bronze medal – third place	2016 Tokyo	‍–‍78 kg
Bronze medal – third place	2019 Ekaterinburg	‍–‍78 kg
Bronze medal – third place	2023 Ulaanbaatar	‍–‍78 kg
Bronze medal – third place	2023 Tokyo	‍–‍78 kg
IJF Grand Prix
Gold medal – first place	2016 Qingdao	‍–‍78 kg
Gold medal – first place	2018 Cancún	‍–‍78 kg
Silver medal – second place	2018 Budapest	‍–‍78 kg
Bronze medal – third place	2015 Ulaanbaatar	‍–‍78 kg
Bronze medal – third place	2015 Jeju	‍–‍78 kg
Bronze medal – third place	2017 Düsseldorf	‍–‍78 kg
Asian Junior Championships
Gold medal – first place	2013 Hainan	‍–‍78 kg

Profile at external databases
- IJF: 17390
- JudoInside.com: 73967
- Updated on 3 August 2024

Rika Takayama (born 27 August 1994) is a Japanese judoka. She is the gold medallist in the ‍–‍78 kg at the 2018 Judo Grand Slam Ekaterinburg
