= Shermukhammad Jandreev =

Uzbekistani judoka (born 1996)

Personal information
- Nationality: Uzbekistani
- Born: 4 September 1997 (age 28)

Sport
- Country: Uzbekistan
- Sport: Judo
- Event: –90 kg
Medal record
World Championships
Bronze medal – third place	2021 Budapest	Mixed team

Shermukhammad Jandreev (born 4 September 1996) is an Uzbekistani judoka.

He won a medal at the 2021 World Judo Championships.
