= Jessica Klimkait =

Canadian judoka (born 1996)

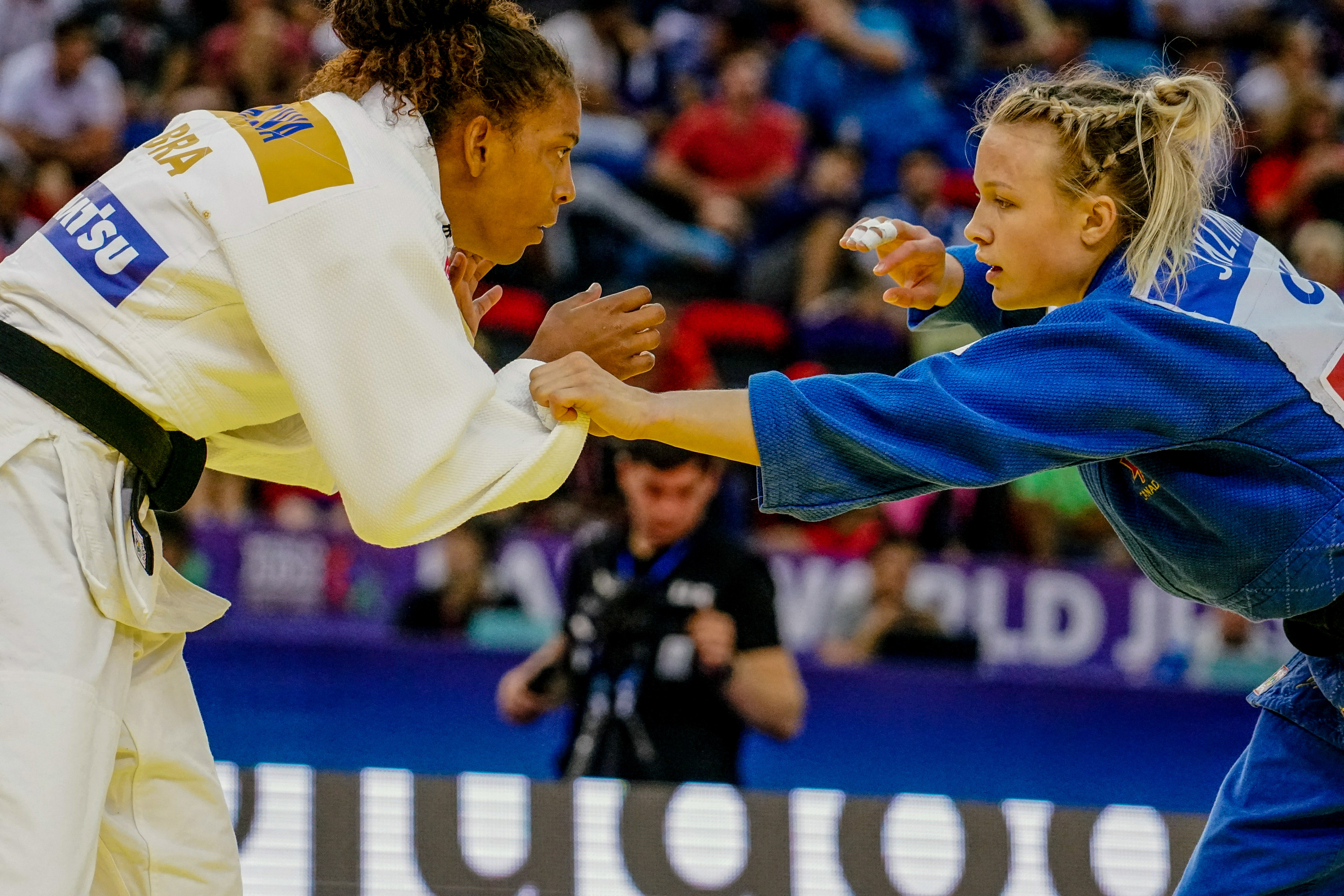
- Klimkait (right) in 2018

Personal information
- Born: 31 December 1996 (age 29) Whitby, Ontario, Canada
- Occupation: Judoka
- Height: 1.65 m (5 ft 5 in)

Sport
- Country: Canada
- Sport: Judo
- Weight class: ‍–‍57 kg, ‍–‍63 kg

Achievements and titles
- Olympic Games: (bronze) (2020)
- World Champ.: (gold) (2021)
- Pan American Champ.: (gold) (2017, 2026)
- Commonwealth Games: 5th (2014)
- Highest world ranking: 1^{st}
Medal record
Women's judo
Representing Canada
Olympic Games
Bronze medal – third place	2020 Tokyo	‍–‍57 kg
World Championships
Gold medal – first place	2021 Budapest	‍–‍57 kg
Bronze medal – third place	2022 Tashkent	‍–‍57 kg
Bronze medal – third place	2023 Doha	‍–‍57 kg
Bronze medal – third place	2024 Abu Dhabi	‍–‍57 kg
Pan American Championships
Gold medal – first place	2017 Panama City	‍–‍57 kg
Gold medal – first place	2026 Panama City	‍–‍63 kg
Bronze medal – third place	2018 San José	‍–‍57 kg
Bronze medal – third place	2023 Calgary	‍–‍57 kg
World Masters
Gold medal – first place	2023 Budapest	‍–‍57 kg
Bronze medal – third place	2018 Guangzhou	‍–‍57 kg
Bronze medal – third place	2019 Qingdao	‍–‍57 kg
Bronze medal – third place	2021 Doha	‍–‍57 kg
IJF Grand Slam
Gold medal – first place	2018 Osaka	‍–‍57 kg
Gold medal – first place	2020 Düsseldorf	‍–‍57 kg
Gold medal – first place	2020 Budapest	‍–‍57 kg
Gold medal – first place	2022 Antalya	‍–‍57 kg
Gold medal – first place	2023 Tel Aviv	‍–‍57 kg
Gold medal – first place	2023 Abu Dhabi	‍–‍57 kg
Gold medal – first place	2024 Dushanbe	‍–‍57 kg
Gold medal – first place	2025 Baku	‍–‍63 kg
Silver medal – second place	2019 Paris	‍–‍57 kg
Silver medal – second place	2021 Antalya	‍–‍57 kg
Silver medal – second place	2023 Paris	‍–‍57 kg
Silver medal – second place	2023 Ulaanbaatar	‍–‍57 kg
Silver medal – second place	2024 Tbilisi	‍–‍57 kg
Bronze medal – third place	2017 Ekaterinburg	‍–‍57 kg
Bronze medal – third place	2019 Ekaterinburg	‍–‍57 kg
Bronze medal – third place	2019 Osaka	‍–‍57 kg
Bronze medal – third place	2022 Budapest	‍–‍57 kg
Bronze medal – third place	2023 Tbilisi	‍–‍57 kg
Bronze medal – third place	2023 Tokyo	‍–‍57 kg
Bronze medal – third place	2024 Paris	‍–‍57 kg
IJF Grand Prix
Gold medal – first place	2019 Zagreb	‍–‍57 kg
Gold medal – first place	2025 Lima	‍–‍63 kg
Gold medal – first place	2026 Zagreb	‍–‍63 kg
Silver medal – second place	2018 Hohhot	‍–‍57 kg
Silver medal – second place	2018 Zagreb	‍–‍57 kg
Silver medal – second place	2018 Cancún	‍–‍57 kg
Silver medal – second place	2019 Montreal	‍–‍57 kg
Silver medal – second place	2025 Guadalajara	‍–‍63 kg
Bronze medal – third place	2017 Hohhot	‍–‍57 kg
Bronze medal – third place	2019 Hohhot	‍–‍57 kg
World Cadets Championships
Gold medal – first place	2013 Miami	‍–‍52 kg

Profile at external databases
- IJF: 7725
- JudoInside.com: 80703
- Updated on 18 November 2026

Jessica Klimkait (born 31 December 1996) is a Canadian Judoka who competes in the women's 57 kg category. In 2021 she became Canada's second judo world champion, defeating Momo Tamaoki of Japan in the women's lightweight (57 kg) final at the championships in Budapest, Hungary; the win also qualified her for the Tokyo Olympic Games. She won one of the bronze medals in the women's 57 kg event at the 2020 Summer Olympics.

== Career ==
In 2013 at the Cadet (U18) World Championship in Miami she became the first Canadian female judoka to win an age group world championship. She won gold at the 2017 Pan American Judo Championships.

In 2021, she won one of the bronze medals in her event at the 2021 Judo World Masters held in Doha, Qatar. A few months later, she won the silver medal in her event at the 2021 Judo Grand Slam Antalya held in Antalya, Turkey.

In June 2021, Klimkait was named to Canada's 2020 Olympic team. She won the bronze medal in the 57-kilogram (126 lb) class with a win over Kaja Kajzer of Slovenia, by waza-ari.

== Early life ==
Klimkait began practicing judo at the age of five at the Ajax Budokan Judo Club after watching her older brother's involvement in the sport.

== Senior International results ==
Medals
	1st place, gold medalist(s)	2nd place, silver medalist(s)	3rd place, bronze medalist(s)
Olympic games			1
World Championships	1	0	0
World Masters	0	0	1
Grand Slam	1	1	2
Continental Championships	1	0	1
Grand Prix	1	4	2
Continental Open	1	1	2
Continental Cup	1	1	0
Totals	6	7	8

Tournament	2013	2014	2015	2016	2017	2018	2019	2020	2021
World Judo Championships					3R	3R	2R		1st place, gold medalist(s)
Pan American Judo Championships	5		1R	5	1st place, gold medalist(s)	3rd place, bronze medalist(s)			
IJF World Masters						3rd place, bronze medalist(s)			
Grand Slam Abu Dhabi			1R		5				
Grand Slam Düsseldorf					1R				
Grand Slam Ekaterinburg					3rd place, bronze medalist(s)		3rd place, bronze medalist(s)		
Grand Slam Osaka						1st place, gold medalist(s)			
Grand Slam Paris				1R	2R		2nd place, silver medalist(s)		
Grand Slam Tokyo			1R	2R	1R				
Grand Prix Budapest						5			
Grand Prix Cancún						2nd place, silver medalist(s)			
Grand Prix Hohhot					3rd place, bronze medalist(s)	2nd place, silver medalist(s)	3rd place, bronze medalist(s)		
Grand Prix Montreal							2nd place, silver medalist(s)		
Grand Prix Zagreb		1R		1R		2nd place, silver medalist(s)	1st place, gold medalist(s)		
European Open Glasgow				1st place, gold medalist(s)					
European Open Madrid				2R					
European Open Oberwart					3rd place, bronze medalist(s)				
Oceanian Open Wollongong		3rd place, bronze medalist(s)							
Pan American Open San Salvador			2nd place, silver medalist(s)						
European Cup Orenburg					1st place, gold medalist(s)				
European Cup Podcetrtek				2nd place, silver medalist(s)					

== See also ==
- Judo in Ontario
- Judo in Canada
- List of Canadian judoka
