= 2023 World Judo Championships – Women's 70 kg =

Judo competition

Judo Women's 70 kg at the 2023 World Judo Championships
- Venue: Ali Bin Hamad Al Attiya Arena
- Location: Doha, Qatar
- Date: 11 May 2023
- Competitors: 49 from 41 nations
- Total prize money: €57,000

Medalists
gold medal	Saki Niizoe (1st title)	Japan
silver medal	Giovanna Scoccimarro	Germany
bronze medal	Michaela Polleres	Austria
bronze medal	Barbara Matić	Croatia

Competition at external databases
- Links: IJF

The Women's 70 kg event at the 2023 World Judo Championships was held at the Ali Bin Hamad al-Attiyah Arena in Doha, Qatar on 11 May 2023.

== Results ==
=== Finals ===
Semi-finals
(Croatia) Barbara Matić	00
(Japan) Saki Niizoe	01
(Germany) Giovanna Scoccimarro	01
(Austria) Michaela Polleres	00

Final
(Japan) Saki Niizoe	02
(Germany) Giovanna Scoccimarro	00

=== Repechage ===
Repechage
(United Kingdom) Katie-Jemima Yeats-Brown	10
(France) Marie-Ève Gahié	00
Madina Taimazova	00
(Venezuela) Elvismar Rodríguez	01

Bronze medal
(United Kingdom) Katie-Jemima Yeats-Brown	00
(Austria) Michaela Polleres	10
(Venezuela) Elvismar Rodríguez	00
(Croatia) Barbara Matić	01

=== Pool A ===
First round
(Madagascar) Aina Laura Rasoanaivo Razafy	00
(Bosnia and Herzegovina) Aleksandra Samardžić	10
(Australia) Aoife Coughlan	00
(Netherlands) Kim Polling	02
(Hungary) Szabina Gercsák	11
(Turkey) Fidan Ögel	00
(Denmark) Emilie Sook	00
(United Kingdom) Katie-Jemima Yeats-Brown	10

Round of 32
(Croatia) Barbara Matić	10
(Bosnia and Herzegovina) Aleksandra Samardžić	00
(Netherlands) Kim Polling	11
(Morocco) Assmaa Niang	00
(Germany) Miriam Butkereit	11
(Hungary) Szabina Gercsák	00
(United Kingdom) Katie-Jemima Yeats-Brown	02
(Romania) Serafima Moscalu	00

Round of 16
(Croatia) Barbara Matić	11
(Netherlands) Kim Polling	00
(Germany) Miriam Butkereit	00
(United Kingdom) Katie-Jemima Yeats-Brown	01

Quarter-finals
(Croatia) Barbara Matić	02
(United Kingdom) Katie-Jemima Yeats-Brown	00

=== Pool B ===
First round
(Cameroon) Zita Ornella Biami	00
(Israel) Maya Goshen	10
(Kazakhstan) Anastassiya Mayakova	00
(Puerto Rico) María Pérez	11
(Ecuador) Celinda Corozo	01
(Tunisia) Nihel Bouchoucha	00
(Uzbekistan) Shokhista Nazarova	10
(Senegal) Khadija Sonko	00

Round of 32
(Japan) Saki Niizoe	01
(Israel) Maya Goshen	00
(Puerto Rico) María Pérez	02
(Austria) Elena Dengg	00
(France) Marie-Ève Gahié	11
(Ecuador) Celinda Corozo	00
(Uzbekistan) Shokhista Nazarova	01
(Sweden) Ida Eriksson	00

Round of 16
(Japan) Saki Niizoe	02
(Puerto Rico) María Pérez	00
(France) Marie-Ève Gahié	02
(Uzbekistan) Shokhista Nazarova	00

Quarter-finals
(Japan) Saki Niizoe	10
(France) Marie-Ève Gahié	00

=== Pool C ===
First round
(Cuba) Idelannis Gómez	00
(Slovenia) Anka Pogačnik	02
(Germany) Giovanna Scoccimarro	10
(Jamaica) Ebony Drysdale Daley	00
(Lithuania) Ugnė Pileckaitė
(Angola) Maria Niangi	w/o
(Denmark) Lærke Olsen	01
(United Kingdom) Kelly Petersen Pollard	00
(Mongolia) Batsuuriin Nyam-Erdene	02
(United States) Chantal Wright	00

Round of 32
(Netherlands) Sanne van Dijke	10
(Slovenia) Anka Pogačnik	00
(Germany) Giovanna Scoccimarro	10
(Angola) Maria Niangi	00
(Spain) Ai Tsunoda	10
(Denmark) Lærke Olsen	00
(Mongolia) Batsuuriin Nyam-Erdene	00
Madina Taimazova	02

Round of 16
(Netherlands) Sanne van Dijke	00
(Germany) Giovanna Scoccimarro	10
(Spain) Ai Tsunoda	00
Madina Taimazova	01

Quarter-finals
(Germany) Giovanna Scoccimarro	01
Madina Taimazova	00

=== Pool D ===
First round
(Republic of Ireland) Rachael Hawkes	10
(Bulgaria) Lidia Brancheva	00
(China) Feng Yingying	01
(Sweden) Anna Bernholm	10
(Chinese Taipei) Liao Yu-jung	02
(Portugal) Joana Crisóstomo	01
(Uzbekistan) Gulnoza Matniyazova	00
(Venezuela) Elvismar Rodríguez	01

Round of 32
(Austria) Michaela Polleres	10
(Republic of Ireland) Rachael Hawkes	00
(Sweden) Anna Bernholm	00
(Poland) Eliza Wróblewska	01
(Croatia) Lara Cvjetko	02
(Chinese Taipei) Liao Yu-jung	00
(Venezuela) Elvismar Rodríguez	10
(Greece) Elisavet Teltsidou	00

Round of 16
(Austria) Michaela Polleres	02
(Poland) Eliza Wróblewska	01
(Croatia) Lara Cvjetko	00
(Venezuela) Elvismar Rodríguez	11

Quarter-finals
(Austria) Michaela Polleres	10
(Venezuela) Elvismar Rodríguez	00

== Prize money ==
The sums listed bring the total prizes awarded to €57,000 for the individual event.

Medal	Total	Judoka	Coach
Gold	€26,000	€20,800	€5,200
Silver	€15,000	€12,000	€3,000
Bronze	€8,000	€6,400	€1,600
