= 2024 World Judo Championships – Women's 70 kg =

Judo competition

Judo Women's 70 kg at the 2024 World Judo Championships
- Venue: Mubadala Arena
- Location: Abu Dhabi, United Arab Emirates
- Date: 22 May 2024
- Competitors: 47 from 39 nations
- Total prize money: €57,000

Medalists
gold medal	Margaux Pinot (1st title)	France
silver medal	Marie-Ève Gahié	France
bronze medal	Shiho Tanaka	Japan
bronze medal	Madina Taimazova

Competition at external databases
- Links: IJF • JudoInside

The Women's 70 kg event at the 2024 World Judo Championships was held at the Mubadala Arena in Abu Dhabi, United Arab Emirates on 22 May 2024.

== Results ==
=== Finals ===
Semi-finals
(Greece) Elisavet Teltsidou	00 (yellow card)
(France) Margaux Pinot	10 (yellow card)
(Belgium) Gabriella Willems	00
(France) Marie-Ève Gahié	02 (yellow card)

Final
(France) Margaux Pinot	01
(France) Marie-Ève Gahié	00

=== Repechage ===
Repechage
(Italy) Irene Pedrotti	00
(Japan) Shiho Tanaka	02
Madina Taimazova	10
(Italy) Kim Polling	00 (yellow card)

Bronze medal
(Japan) Shiho Tanaka	02 (yellow card)
(Belgium) Gabriella Willems	00
Madina Taimazova	10
(Greece) Elisavet Teltsidou	00

=== Pool A ===
First round
(Slovenia) Anka Pogačnik	00 (yellow card)
(Denmark) Emilie Sook	10
(Turkey) Fidan Ögel	w/o
(Angola) Maria Niangi
(Bosnia and Herzegovina) Aleksandra Samardžić	00
(Italy) Irene Pedrotti	01

Round of 32
(Greece) Elisavet Teltsidou	11 (yellow card)
(Denmark) Emilie Sook	00
(Turkey) Fidan Ögel	00
(North Korea) Mun Song-hui	10
(Puerto Rico) María Pérez	00
(Italy) Irene Pedrotti	10
(Venezuela) Elvismar Rodríguez	00
(United Kingdom) Kelly Petersen Pollard	10

Round of 16
(Greece) Elisavet Teltsidou	10
(North Korea) Mun Song-hui	00
(Italy) Irene Pedrotti	10
(United Kingdom) Kelly Petersen Pollard	00

Quarter-finals
(Greece) Elisavet Teltsidou	10
(Italy) Irene Pedrotti	00

=== Pool B ===
First round
(Kazakhstan) Ekaterina Tokareva	10
(Uzbekistan) Gulnoza Matniyazova	00
(Netherlands) Margit de Voogd	02
(China) Feng Yingying	00
(Poland) Eliza Wróblewska	00 (yellow card)
(Jamaica) Ebony Drysdale Daley	11
(Brazil) Ellen Froner	00
(France) Margaux Pinot	10

Round of 32
(Spain) Ai Tsunoda	10 (yellow card)
(Kazakhstan) Ekaterina Tokareva	00
(Netherlands) Margit de Voogd	00 (yellow card)
(Japan) Shiho Tanaka	02
(Australia) Aoife Coughlan	10 (yellow card)
(Jamaica) Ebony Drysdale Daley	00 (yellow card)
(France) Margaux Pinot	10
(Hungary) Szabina Gercsák	00

Round of 16
(Spain) Ai Tsunoda	00
(Japan) Shiho Tanaka	10
(Australia) Aoife Coughlan	00
(France) Margaux Pinot	01

Quarter-finals
(Japan) Shiho Tanaka	00
(France) Margaux Pinot	10

=== Pool C ===
First round
(Brazil) Luana Carvalho	00
(Netherlands) Hilde Jager	10
(Belgium) Gabriella Willems	11
(Chinese Taipei) Liao Yu-jung	01
(Ecuador) Celinda Corozo	00 (yellow card)
(Switzerland) Alina Lengweiler	01
(Morocco) Assmaa Niang	00
(Portugal) Tais Pina	11

Round of 32
(Austria) Michaela Polleres	01
(Netherlands) Hilde Jager	00
(Belgium) Gabriella Willems	10
(Germany) Giovanna Scoccimarro	00
Madina Taimazova	01 (yellow card)
(Switzerland) Alina Lengweiler	00
(Portugal) Tais Pina	00
(Poland) Katarzyna Sobierajska	10

Round of 16
(Austria) Michaela Polleres	00 (yellow card)
(Belgium) Gabriella Willems	01 (yellow card)
Madina Taimazova	02 (yellow card)
(Poland) Katarzyna Sobierajska	00

Quarter-finals
(Belgium) Gabriella Willems	10
Madina Taimazova	00

=== Pool D ===
First round
(Uzbekistan) Shokhista Nazarova	00
(Italy) Kim Polling	01
(Sweden) Ida Eriksson	11
(Costa Rica) Diana Brenes	00 (yellow card)
(United Kingdom) Katie-Jemima Yeats-Brown	10
(United States) Melissa Myers	00
(Denmark) Lærke Olsen	10
(Madagascar) Aina Laura Rasoanaivo Razafy	00

Round of 32
(Croatia) Lara Cvjetko	00
(Italy) Kim Polling	10
(Sweden) Ida Eriksson	02
(Mongolia) Batsuuriin Nyam-Erdene	00
(France) Marie-Ève Gahié	11
(United Kingdom) Katie-Jemima Yeats-Brown	00
(Denmark) Lærke Olsen	02
(Israel) Maya Goshen	00

Round of 16
(Italy) Kim Polling	10 (yellow card)
(Sweden) Ida Eriksson	00
(France) Marie-Ève Gahié	02
(Denmark) Lærke Olsen	00 (yellow card)

Quarter-finals
(Italy) Kim Polling	00
(France) Marie-Ève Gahié	02

== Prize money ==
The sums listed bring the total prizes awarded to €57,000 for the individual event.

Medal	Total	Judoka	Coach
Gold	€26,000	€20,800	€5,200
Silver	€15,000	€12,000	€3,000
Bronze	€8,000	€6,400	€1,600
