= 2026 World Judo Championships – Women's 70 kg =

Judo competition

Judo Women's 70 kg at the 2026 World Judo Championships
- Venue: National Gymnastics Arena
- Location: Baku, Azerbaijan
- Date: 8 October 2026
- Competitors: 44 from 34 nations
- Total prize money: €57,000

Medalists
gold medal	Ai Tsunoda (1st title)	Spain
silver medal	Michaela Polleres	Austria
bronze medal	Giovanna Scoccimarro	Germany
bronze medal	Madina Taimazova	Russia

Competition at external databases
- Links: IJF

The women's 70 kg event at the 2026 World Judo Championships was held at the National Gymnastics Arena in Baku, Azerbaijan on 8 October 2026.

== Results ==
=== Finals ===
Semi-finals
(Spain) Ai Tsunoda	001
(Serbia) Aleksandra Andrić	000
(Austria) Michaela Polleres	001 (yellow card)
(Germany) Giovanna Scoccimarro	000 (yellow card)

Final
(Spain) Ai Tsunoda	100 (yellow card)
(Austria) Michaela Polleres	000

=== Repechage ===
Repechage
(Sweden) Ingrid Nilsson	000
(Brazil) Nauana Silva	010
(Russia) Madina Taimazova	001
(Sweden) Ida Eriksson	000

Bronze medal
(Brazil) Nauana Silva	000 (yellow card)
(Germany) Giovanna Scoccimarro	001
(Russia) Madina Taimazova	001
(Serbia) Aleksandra Andrić	000

=== Pool A ===
First round
(Ecuador) Celinda Corozo	000
(Netherlands) Sanne van Dijke	100
(Azerbaijan) Sudaba Aghayeva	000 (yellow card)
(Spain) Ai Tsunoda	100 (yellow card)
(Denmark) Lærke Olsen	000 (yellow card)
(Bosnia and Herzegovina) Aleksandra Samardžić	101

Round of 32
(Croatia) Lara Cvjetko	000
(Netherlands) Sanne van Dijke	010
(Spain) Ai Tsunoda	010
(Slovenia) Nika Koren	000
(Italy) Giorgia Stangherlin	000
(Bosnia and Herzegovina) Aleksandra Samardžić	001
(India) Taibanganbi Chanu Khaidem	000
(Sweden) Ingrid Nilsson	101

Round of 16
(Netherlands) Sanne van Dijke	000 (yellow card)
(Spain) Ai Tsunoda	001
(Bosnia and Herzegovina) Aleksandra Samardžić	000
(Sweden) Ingrid Nilsson	010 (yellow card)

Quarter-finals
(Spain) Ai Tsunoda	020
(Sweden) Ingrid Nilsson	000 (yellow card)

=== Pool B ===
First round
(Russia) Tamara Lishchenko	010
(Uzbekistan) Khurshida Razzokberdieva	000 (yellow card)
(China) Liu Lu	000
(Serbia) Aleksandra Andrić	101
(Chinese Taipei) Liao Yu-jung	000
(Greece) Elisavet Teltsidou	010 (yellow card)

Round of 32
(Germany) Miriam Butkereit	010
(Russia) Tamara Lishchenko	000 (yellow card)
(Serbia) Aleksandra Andrić	021
(United States) Isabella Garriga	000
(France) Clémence Eme	100
(Greece) Elisavet Teltsidou	000
(Brazil) Nauana Silva	001
(Slovakia) Ema Fízeľová	000 (yellow card)

Round of 16
(Germany) Miriam Butkereit	000
(Serbia) Aleksandra Andrić	100 (yellow card)
(France) Clémence Eme	000 (yellow card)
(Brazil) Nauana Silva	010

Quarter-finals
(Serbia) Aleksandra Andrić	101 (yellow card)
(Brazil) Nauana Silva	000 (yellow card)

=== Pool C ===
First round
(United States) Melissa Myers	000
(Austria) Michaela Polleres	110
~~(Slovenia) Kaja Schuster~~
(South Korea) Lee Ye-rang	w/o
(Italy) Irene Pedrotti	001 (yellow card)
(Poland) Aleksandra Kowalewska	000 (yellow card)

Round of 32
(Australia) Aoife Coughlan	000
(Austria) Michaela Polleres	100 (yellow card)
(South Korea) Lee Ye-rang	101 (yellow card)
(India) Inunganbi Takhellambam	001
(Russia) Madina Taimazova	001
(Portugal) Taís Pina	000 (yellow card)
(Italy) Irene Pedrotti	000
(United Kingdom) Kelly Petersen Pollard	010 (yellow card)

Round of 16
(Austria) Michaela Polleres	101 (yellow card)
(South Korea) Lee Ye-rang	000 (yellow card)
(Russia) Madina Taimazova	011 (yellow card)
(United Kingdom) Kelly Petersen Pollard	000

Quarter-finals
(Austria) Michaela Polleres	012 (yellow card)
(Russia) Madina Taimazova	000 (yellow card)

=== Pool D ===
First round
(Netherlands) Margit de Voogd	000
(Switzerland) Gioia Vetterli	100
(Romania) Serafima Moscalu	000
(Madagascar) Aina Laura Rasoanaivo Razafy	100
(Georgia (country)) Nino Gulbani	100
(China) Feng Yingying	001

Round of 32
(Japan) Shiho Tanaka	100
(Switzerland) Gioia Vetterli	000
(Madagascar) Aina Laura Rasoanaivo Razafy	000 (yellow card)
(Germany) Giovanna Scoccimarro	001 (yellow card)
(Sweden) Ida Eriksson	100
(Uzbekistan) Shirinjon Yuldoshova	000
(Georgia (country)) Nino Gulbani	011 (yellow card)
(Israel) Maya Goshen	000 (yellow card)

Round of 16
(Japan) Shiho Tanaka	000
(Germany) Giovanna Scoccimarro	100
(Sweden) Ida Eriksson	100
(Georgia (country)) Nino Gulbani	000

Quarter-finals
(Germany) Giovanna Scoccimarro	010
(Sweden) Ida Eriksson	000

== Prize money ==
The sums listed bring the total prizes awarded to €57,000 for the individual event.

Medal	Total	Judoka	Coach
Gold	€26,000	€20,800	€5,200
Silver	€15,000	€12,000	€3,000
Bronze	€8,000	€6,400	€1,600
