= 2023 European Judo Championships – Women's 70 kg =

Judo competition

Judo Women's 70 kg at the 2023 European Judo Championships
- Venue: Sud de France Arena
- Location: Montpellier, France
- Date: 4 November 2023
- Competitors: 33 from 24 nations

Medalists
gold medal	Marie-Ève Gahié (2nd title)	France
silver medal	Madina Taimazova
bronze medal	Sanne van Dijke	Netherlands
bronze medal	Barbara Matić	Croatia

Competition at external databases
- Links: IJF • JudoInside

The Women's 70 kg event at the 2023 European Judo Championships was held at the Sud de France Arena in Montpellier, France on 4 November 2023.

== Results ==
=== Finals ===
Semi-finals
Madina Taimazova	10
(Croatia) Barbara Matić	00
(France) Marie-Ève Gahié	10
(Greece) Elisavet Teltsidou	01 (yellow card)

Final
Madina Taimazova	00 (yellow card)
(France) Marie-Ève Gahié	02

=== Repechage ===
Repechage
(Netherlands) Sanne van Dijke	10
(Croatia) Lara Cvjetko	00 (yellow card)
(Slovenia) Anka Pogačnik	10
(Israel) Maya Goshen	00

Bronze medal
(Netherlands) Sanne van Dijke	10 (yellow card)
(Greece) Elisavet Teltsidou	00 (yellow card)
(Slovenia) Anka Pogačnik	00
(Croatia) Barbara Matić	02

=== Pool A ===
First round

Round of 32
(Netherlands) Sanne van Dijke	10
(Bulgaria) Lidia Brancheva	00
(Kosovo) Loriana Kuka	10
(Sweden) Anna Bernholm	00
(France) Margaux Pinot	01
(Denmark) Emilie Sook	00
(Poland) Eliza Wróblewska	00 (yellow card)
Madina Taimazova	10

Round of 16
(Netherlands) Sanne van Dijke	10
(Kosovo) Loriana Kuka	00
(France) Margaux Pinot	00
Madina Taimazova	01

Quarter-finals
(Netherlands) Sanne van Dijke	00
Madina Taimazova	01

=== Pool B ===
First round

Round of 32
(Croatia) Barbara Matić	10
(Republic of Ireland) Rachael Hawkes	00
(Georgia (country)) Nino Gulbani	00
(Bosnia and Herzegovina) Aleksandra Samardžić	10 (yellow card)
(Croatia) Lara Cvjetko	01
(Switzerland) Alina Lengweiler	00
(Austria) Elena Dengg	00 (yellow card)
(Romania) Serafima Moscalu	11

Round of 16
(Croatia) Barbara Matić	02
(Bosnia and Herzegovina) Aleksandra Samardžić	00
(Croatia) Lara Cvjetko	10 (yellow card)
(Romania) Serafima Moscalu	00

Quarter-finals
(Croatia) Barbara Matić	10 (yellow card)
(Croatia) Lara Cvjetko	00

=== Pool C ===
First round
(Germany) Miriam Butkereit	10
(Portugal) Joana Crisóstomo	01 (yellow card)

Round of 32
(Austria) Michaela Polleres	00 (yellow card)
(Slovenia) Anka Pogačnik	01
(Italy) Irene Pedrotti	10 (yellow card)
(Denmark) Lærke Olsen	00
(France) Marie-Ève Gahié	10
(Switzerland) Gioia Vetterli	00
(Germany) Miriam Butkereit	01
(Netherlands) Kim Polling	00 (yellow card)

Round of 16
(Slovenia) Anka Pogačnik	01 (yellow card)
(Italy) Irene Pedrotti	00 (yellow card)
(France) Marie-Ève Gahié	02
(Germany) Miriam Butkereit	00

Quarter-finals
(Slovenia) Anka Pogačnik	00
(France) Marie-Ève Gahié	10

=== Pool D ===
First round

Round of 32
(Greece) Elisavet Teltsidou	11
Daria Khramoikina	00
(Sweden) Ida Eriksson	00 (yellow card)
(United Kingdom) Katie-Jemima Yeats-Brown	01 (yellow card)
(Spain) Ai Tsunoda	00 (yellow card)
(Israel) Maya Goshen	01 (yellow card)
(Hungary) Szabina Gercsák	00
(Georgia (country)) Mariam Tchanturia	10 (yellow card)

Round of 16
(Greece) Elisavet Teltsidou	11
(United Kingdom) Katie-Jemima Yeats-Brown	00
(Israel) Maya Goshen	10
(Georgia (country)) Mariam Tchanturia	00

Quarter-finals
(Greece) Elisavet Teltsidou	10
(Israel) Maya Goshen	00
