= 2022 World Judo Championships – Women's 70 kg =

Judo competition

Judo Women's 70 kg at the 2022 World Judo Championships
- Venue: Humo Ice Dome
- Location: Tashkent, Uzbekistan
- Date: 10 October
- Competitors: 44 from 34 nations
- Total prize money: €57,000

Medalists
| gold medal | Barbara Matić (2nd title) | Croatia |
| silver medal | Lara Cvjetko | Croatia |
| bronze medal | Saki Niizoe | Japan |
| bronze medal | Sanne van Dijke | Netherlands |

Competition at external databases
- Links: IJF • JudoInside

The Women's 70 kg event at the 2022 World Judo Championships was held at the Humo Ice Dome arena in Tashkent, Uzbekistan on 10 October 2022.

== Results ==
=== Finals ===
Semi-finals
(Croatia) Barbara Matić | 10
(Japan) Shiho Tanaka | 00
(Croatia) Lara Cvjetko | 10
(Japan) Saki Niizoe | 00

Final
(Croatia) Barbara Matić | 10
(Croatia) Lara Cvjetko | 00

=== Repechage ===
Repechage
(Uzbekistan) Gulnoza Matniyazova | 00
(Germany) Miriam Butkereit | 10
(Netherlands) Sanne van Dijke | 10
(Austria) Michaela Polleres | 00

Bronze medal
(Germany) Miriam Butkereit | 00
(Japan) Saki Niizoe | 01
(Netherlands) Sanne van Dijke | 10
(Japan) Shiho Tanaka | 00

=== Pool A ===
First round
(Sweden) Anna Bernholm | 00
(Netherlands) Hilde Jager | 10
(Bosnia and Herzegovina) Aleksandra Samardžić | 11
(Greece) Elisavet Teltsidou | 00
(Uzbekistan) Gulnoza Matniyazova | 11
(United States) Chantal Wright | 00

Round of 32
(Croatia) Barbara Matić | 10
(Netherlands) Hilde Jager | 00
(Romania) Serafima Moscalu | 00
(Bosnia and Herzegovina) Aleksandra Samardžić | 01
(United Kingdom) Kelly Petersen Pollard | 00
(Uzbekistan) Gulnoza Matniyazova | 10
(Cameroon) Zita Ornella Biami | 00
(Turkey) Fidan Ögel | 10

Round of 16
(Croatia) Barbara Matić | 10
(Bosnia and Herzegovina) Aleksandra Samardžić | 00
(Uzbekistan) Gulnoza Matniyazova | 10
(Turkey) Fidan Ögel | 00

Quarter-finals
(Croatia) Barbara Matić | 01
(Uzbekistan) Gulnoza Matniyazova | 00

=== Pool B ===
First round
(Tunisia) Nihel Bouchoucha | 10
(Chinese Taipei) Chang Ssu-tzu | 00
(Hungary) Szabina Gercsák | 00
(Slovenia) Anka Pogačnik | 10
(Denmark) Lærke Olsen | 00
(Japan) Shiho Tanaka | 10

Round of 32
(Germany) Miriam Butkereit | 10
(Tunisia) Nihel Bouchoucha | 00
(Slovenia) Anka Pogačnik | 10
(Australia) Aoife Coughlan | 00
(Brazil) Maria Portela | 10
(Kazakhstan) Anastassiya Mayakova | 01
(Japan) Shiho Tanaka | 10
(Ukraine) Nataliia Chystiakova | 00

Round of 16
(Germany) Miriam Butkereit | 10
(Slovenia) Anka Pogačnik | 00
(Brazil) Maria Portela | 00
(Japan) Shiho Tanaka | 10

Quarter-finals
(Germany) Miriam Butkereit | 00
(Japan) Shiho Tanaka | 10

=== Pool C ===
First round
~~Nigara Shaheen~~ | 00
(United Kingdom) Katie-Jemima Yeats-Brown | w/o
(Chinese Taipei) Liao Yu-jung | 10
(Uzbekistan) Shokhista Nazarova | 00
(Puerto Rico) María Pérez | 00
(Belgium) Gabriella Willems | 10

Round of 32
(Netherlands) Sanne van Dijke | 11
(United Kingdom) Katie-Jemima Yeats-Brown | 00
(Israel) Maya Goshen | 10
(Chinese Taipei) Liao Yu-jung | 00
(France) Margaux Pinot | 00
(Croatia) Lara Cvjetko | 01
(Belgium) Gabriella Willems | 00
(Italy) Martina Esposito | 01

Round of 16
(Netherlands) Sanne van Dijke | 10
(Israel) Maya Goshen | 00
(Croatia) Lara Cvjetko | 01
(Italy) Martina Esposito | 00

Quarter-finals
(Netherlands) Sanne van Dijke | 00
(Croatia) Lara Cvjetko | 01

=== Pool D ===
First round
(Venezuela) Elvismar Rodríguez | 00
(Japan) Saki Niizoe | 01
(Poland) Katarzyna Sobierajska | 01
(Spain) Ai Tsunoda | 00
(Sweden) Ida Eriksson | 00
(Germany) Sarah Mäkelburg | 01

Round of 32
(France) Marie-Ève Gahié | 10
(Brazil) Luana Carvalho | 00
(Japan) Saki Niizoe | 10
(Mongolia) Tserendulamyn Enkhchimeg | 00
(Austria) Michaela Polleres | 10
(Poland) Katarzyna Sobierajska | 00
(Germany) Sarah Mäkelburg | 10
(Jamaica) Ebony Drysdale Daley | 00

Round of 16
(France) Marie-Ève Gahié | 00
(Japan) Saki Niizoe | 01
(Austria) Michaela Polleres | 10
(Germany) Sarah Mäkelburg | 00

Quarter-finals
(Japan) Saki Niizoe | 11
(Austria) Michaela Polleres | 00
