= 2022 European Judo Championships – Women's 70 kg =

Judo Women's 70 kg at the 2022 European Judo Championships
- Venue: Armeets Arena
- Location: Sofia, Bulgaria
- Date: 30 April
- Competitors: 29 from 22 nations

Medalists
gold medal	Marie-Ève Gahié (1st title)	France
silver medal	Sanne van Dijke	Netherlands
bronze medal	Margaux Pinot	France
bronze medal	Anka Pogačnik	Slovenia

Competition at external databases
- Links: IJF • JudoInside

The women's 70 kg competition at the 2022 European Judo Championships was held on 30 April at the Armeets Arena.

== Results ==
=== Finals ===
Semi-finals
Hilde Jager (NED)	00
Marie-Ève Gahié (FRA)	10
Sanne van Dijke (NED)	10
Michaela Polleres (AUT)	00

Final
Marie-Ève Gahié (FRA)	01
Sanne van Dijke (NED)	00

=== Repechage ===
Repechage
Ida Eriksson (SWE)	00
Margaux Pinot (FRA)	10
Anka Pogačnik (SLO)	01
Kelly Petersen Pollard (GBR)	00

Bronze medal
Margaux Pinot (FRA)	11
Michaela Polleres (AUT)	00
Anka Pogačnik (SLO)	10
Hilde Jager (NED)	00

=== Pool A ===
First round
Katie-Jemima Yeats-Brown (GBR)	00
Ida Eriksson (SWE)	11
Hilde Jager (NED)	11
Jovana Bunčić (SRB)	00
Rachael Hawkes (IRL)	00
Lidia Brancheva (BUL)	10

Round of 16
Barbara Matić (CRO)	00
Ida Eriksson (SWE)	01
Hilde Jager (NED)	10
Lidia Brancheva (BUL)	00

Quarterfinals
Ida Eriksson (SWE)	00
Hilde Jager (NED)	10

=== Pool B ===
First round
Margaux Pinot (FRA)	10
Serafima Moscalu (ROU)	00
Maya Goshen (ISR)	00
Minel Akdeniz (TUR)	10
Marie-Ève Gahié (FRA)	10
Irene Pedrotti (ITA)	00
Bernadette Graf (AUT)	00
Nataliia Chystiakova (UKR)	10

Round of 16
Margaux Pinot (FRA)	10
Minel Akdeniz (TUR)	00
Marie-Ève Gahié (FRA)	10
Nataliia Chystiakova (UKR)	00

Quarterfinals
Margaux Pinot (FRA)	00
Marie-Ève Gahié (FRA)	10

=== Pool C ===
First round
Gabriella Willems (BEL)	11
Szabina Gercsák (HUN)	00
Anka Pogačnik (SLO)	10
Fidan Ögel (TUR)	00
Elisavet Teltsidou (GRE)	01
Katarzyna Sobierajska (POL)	11

Round of 16
Sanne van Dijke (NED)	10
Gabriella Willems (BEL)	00
Anka Pogačnik (SLO)	10
Katarzyna Sobierajska (POL)	00

Quarterfinals
Sanne van Dijke (NED)	10
Anka Pogačnik (SLO)	00

=== Pool D ===
First round
Aleksandra Samardžić (BIH)	00
Ai Tsunoda (ESP)	01
Kelly Petersen Pollard (GBR)	10
Yuliia Kurchenko (UKR)	00
Lærke Olsen (DEN)	00
Martina Esposito (ITA)	11

Round of 16
Michaela Polleres (AUT)	10
Ai Tsunoda (ESP)	00
Kelly Petersen Pollard (GBR)	10
Martina Esposito (ITA)	00

Quarterfinals
Michaela Polleres (AUT)	01
Kelly Petersen Pollard (GBR)	00
