= 2025 European Judo Championships – Women's 70 kg =

Judo competition

Judo Women's 70 kg at the 2025 European Judo Championships
- Venue: Morača Sports Center
- Location: Podgorica, Montenegro
- Date: 25 April 2025
- Competitors: 40 from 27 nations

Medalists
gold medal	Szofi Özbas (1st title)	Hungary
silver medal	Elisavet Teltsidou	Greece
bronze medal	Lara Cvjetko	Croatia
bronze medal	Aleksandra Andrić	Serbia

Competition at external databases
- Links: IJF • JudoInside

The women's 70 kg competition at the 2025 European Judo Championships was held at the Morača Sports Center in Podgorica, Montenegro on 25 April 2025.

== Results ==
=== Finals ===
Semi-finals
(Portugal) Tais Pina	000
(Hungary) Szofi Özbas	101
(France) Marie-Ève Gahié	001 (yellow card)
(Greece) Elisavet Teltsidou	011

Final
(Hungary) Szofi Özbas	020 (yellow card)
(Greece) Elisavet Teltsidou	000

=== Repechage ===
Repechage
(Croatia) Lara Cvjetko	001 (yellow card)
(Spain) Ai Tsunoda	000 (yellow card)
(Serbia) Aleksandra Andrić	101
(Germany) Miriam Butkereit	000 (yellow card)

Bronze medal
(Croatia) Lara Cvjetko	101 (yellow card)
(France) Marie-Ève Gahié	000
(Serbia) Aleksandra Andrić	100
(Portugal) Tais Pina	000

=== Pool A ===
First round
(Austria) Elena Dengg	000
(Germany) Dena Pohl	001
(Israel) Adelina Novitzki	020
(Azerbaijan) Sudaba Aghayeva	000

Round of 32
(Croatia) Lara Cvjetko	022 (yellow card)
(Germany) Dena Pohl	000 (yellow card)
(Lithuania) Ugnė Pileckaitė	000
(Switzerland) April Lynn Fohouo	010
(Portugal) Tais Pina	020 (yellow card)
(Israel) Adelina Novitzki	000
(Georgia (country)) Mariam Tchanturia	010 (yellow card)
(Poland) Aleksandra Kowalewska	100

Round of 16
(Croatia) Lara Cvjetko	001
(Switzerland) April Lynn Fohouo	000
(Portugal) Tais Pina	100 (yellow card)
(Poland) Aleksandra Kowalewska	000 (yellow card)

Quarter-finals
(Croatia) Lara Cvjetko	000
(Portugal) Tais Pina	010

=== Pool B ===
First round
(Denmark) Lærke Olsen	000
(Hungary) Szofi Özbas	100
(Czech Republic) Věra Zemanová	000 (yellow card)
(Italy) Giorgia Stangherlin	011 (yellow card)

Round of 32
(Netherlands) Sanne van Dijke	000
(Hungary) Szofi Özbas	001 (yellow card)
(United Kingdom) Kelly Petersen Pollard	100
(Serbia) Jovana Čakarević	000
(Spain) Ai Tsunoda	100 (yellow card)
(Italy) Giorgia Stangherlin	000
(Ukraine) Olha Tsimko	000
(Belgium) Gabriella Willems	101

Round of 16
(Hungary) Szofi Özbas	001 (yellow card)
(United Kingdom) Kelly Petersen Pollard	000
(Spain) Ai Tsunoda	010 (yellow card)
(Belgium) Gabriella Willems	000

Quarter-finals
(Hungary) Szofi Özbas	001 (yellow card)
(Spain) Ai Tsunoda	000 (yellow card)

=== Pool C ===
First round
(Denmark) Emilie Sook	000
(Italy) Irene Pedrotti	010 (yellow card)
(Azerbaijan) Gunel Hasanli	000 (yellow card)
(Ukraine) Anna Oliinyk-Korniiko	010 (yellow card)

Round of 32
(France) Marie-Ève Gahié	100
(Turkey) Fidan Ögel	000
(Italy) Irene Pedrotti	000
(Netherlands) Margit de Voogd	100
(Sweden) Ida Eriksson	000 (yellow card)
(Serbia) Aleksandra Andrić	100
(Ukraine) Anna Oliinyk-Korniiko	000
(Bosnia and Herzegovina) Aleksandra Samardžić	001 (yellow card)

Round of 16
(France) Marie-Ève Gahié	100
(Netherlands) Margit de Voogd	000
(Serbia) Aleksandra Andrić	001 (yellow card)
(Bosnia and Herzegovina) Aleksandra Samardžić	000

Quarter-finals
(France) Marie-Ève Gahié	100
(Serbia) Aleksandra Andrić	000

=== Pool D ===
First round
(Slovenia) Kaja Schuster	100
(Czech Republic) Julie Zárybnická	000
(Croatia) Anđela Violić	000
(Lithuania) Aida Vasiliauskaitė	001

Round of 32
(Germany) Miriam Butkereit	100
(Slovenia) Kaja Schuster	000
(Portugal) Bárbara Timo	011
(Romania) Serafima Moscalu	000
(Greece) Elisavet Teltsidou	011 (yellow card)
(Lithuania) Aida Vasiliauskaitė	000
(Switzerland) Gioia Vetterli	000
(Israel) Maya Kogan	100

Round of 16
(Germany) Miriam Butkereit	010
(Portugal) Bárbara Timo	000 (yellow card)
(Greece) Elisavet Teltsidou	110
(Israel) Maya Kogan	000

Quarter-finals
(Germany) Miriam Butkereit	000
(Greece) Elisavet Teltsidou	100
