= 2024 European Judo Championships – Women's 70 kg =

Judo competition

Judo Women's 70 kg at the 2024 European Judo Championships
- Venue: Arena Zagreb
- Location: Zagreb, Croatia
- Date: 26 April
- Competitors: 30 from 23 nations

Medalists
gold medal	Barbara Matić (1st title)	Croatia
silver medal	Elisavet Teltsidou	Greece
bronze medal	Lara Cvjetko	Croatia
bronze medal	Ai Tsunoda	Spain

Competition at external databases
- Links: IJF • JudoInside

The women's 70 kg competition at the 2024 European Judo Championships was held on 26 April at the Arena Zagreb.

== Results ==
=== Finals ===
Semi-finals
Barbara Matić (CRO)	10 (yellow card)
Ai Tsunoda (ESP)	00
Elisavet Teltsidou (GRE)	w/o
Miriam Butkereit (GER)

Final
Barbara Matić (CRO)	10
Elisavet Teltsidou (GRE)	00

=== Repechage ===
Repechage
Hilde Jager (NED)	00 (yellow card)
Lara Cvjetko (CRO)	10
Irene Pedrotti (ITA)	00
Joana Crisóstomo (POR)	10

Bronze medal
Lara Cvjetko (CRO)	w/o
Miriam Butkereit (GER)
Joana Crisóstomo (POR)	00
Ai Tsunoda (ESP)	02

=== Pool A ===
First round
Mariam Tchanturia (GEO)	00
Kelly Petersen Pollard (GBR)	01 (yellow card)
Giovanna Scoccimarro (GER)	02
Eliza Wróblewska (POL)	00
Hilde Jager (NED)	01 (yellow card)
Kaja Schuster (SLO)	00

Round of 16
Barbara Matić (CRO)	11
Kelly Petersen Pollard (GBR)	00 (yellow card)
Giovanna Scoccimarro (GER)	00 (yellow card)
Hilde Jager (NED)	01

Quarter-finals
Barbara Matić (CRO)	01 (yellow card)
Hilde Jager (NED)	00 (yellow card)

=== Pool B ===
First round
Lara Cvjetko (CRO)	10
Lærke Olsen (DEN)	00 (yellow card)
Szabina Gercsák (HUN)	10
Maya Goshen (ISR)	00
Ai Tsunoda (ESP)	10
Taís Pina (POR)	00
Martina Esposito (ITA)	10
Fidan Ögel (TUR)	00

Round of 16
Lara Cvjetko (CRO)	10
Szabina Gercsák (HUN)	00
Ai Tsunoda (ESP)	10
Martina Esposito (ITA)	00

Quarter-finals
Lara Cvjetko (CRO)	00 (yellow card)
Ai Tsunoda (ESP)	01

=== Pool C ===
First round
Nino Gulbani (GEO)	00 (yellow card)
Jovana Čakarević (SRB)	01
Margaux Pinot (FRA)	00
Irene Pedrotti (ITA)	10
Ida Eriksson (SWE)	10
Ugnė Pileckaitė (LTU)	00

Round of 16
Elisavet Teltsidou (GRE)	11
Jovana Čakarević (SRB)	00
Irene Pedrotti (ITA)	10 (yellow card)
Ida Eriksson (SWE)	00

Quarter-finals
Elisavet Teltsidou (GRE)	01 (yellow card)
Irene Pedrotti (ITA)	00 (yellow card)

=== Pool D ===
First round
Miriam Butkereit (GER)	10 (yellow card)
Katie-Jemima Yeats-Brown (GBR)	00
Alina Lengweiler (SUI)	00
Emilie Sook (DEN)	01 (yellow card)
Madina Taimazova (AIN)	00
Gabriella Willems (BEL)	10
Aleksandra Samardžić (BIH)	01 (yellow card)
Joana Crisóstomo (POR)	02 (yellow card)

Round of 16
Miriam Butkereit (GER)	10
Emilie Sook (DEN)	00
Gabriella Willems (BEL)	00
Joana Crisóstomo (POR)	10

Quarter-finals
Miriam Butkereit (GER)	01 (yellow card)
Joana Crisóstomo (POR)	00 (yellow card)
