= 2025 World Judo Championships – Women's 70 kg =

Judo competition

Judo Women's 70 kg at the 2025 World Judo Championships
- Venue: László Papp Budapest Sports Arena
- Location: Budapest, Hungary
- Date: 17 June 2025
- Competitors: 41 from 34 nations
- Total prize money: €57,000

Medalists
gold medal	Shiho Tanaka (1st title)	Japan
silver medal	Lara Cvjetko	Croatia
bronze medal	Sanne van Dijke	Netherlands
bronze medal	Miriam Butkereit	Germany

Competition at external databases
- Links: IJF • JudoInside

The 2025 World Judo Championships was held at the László Papp Budapest Sports Arena in Budapest, Hungary on 17 June 2025.

== Results ==
=== Finals ===
Semi-finals
(Croatia) Lara Cvjetko	001 (yellow card)
(Australia) Aoife Coughlan	000 (yellow card)
(Japan) Shiho Tanaka	002
(Spain) Ai Tsunoda	000 (yellow card)

Final
(Croatia) Lara Cvjetko	000
(Japan) Shiho Tanaka	001

=== Repechage ===
Repechage
(France) Margaux Pinot	000 (yellow card)
(Netherlands) Sanne van Dijke	001 (yellow card)
(Germany) Miriam Butkereit	100 (yellow card)
(Greece) Elisavet Teltsidou	000

Bronze medal
(Netherlands) Sanne van Dijke	001
(Spain) Ai Tsunoda	000
(Germany) Miriam Butkereit	100
(Australia) Aoife Coughlan	000

=== Pool A ===
First round
(Hungary) Jennifer Czerlau	000
(Belgium) Gabriella Willems	001 (yellow card)
~~(Israel) Adelina Novitzki~~
(Germany) Giovanna Scoccimarro	w/o

Round of 32
(Croatia) Lara Cvjetko	010
(North Korea) Mun Song-hui	000
(Belgium) Gabriella Willems	010
(Ecuador) Celinda Corozo	000 (yellow card)
(France) Margaux Pinot	010
(Germany) Giovanna Scoccimarro	000 (yellow card)
(Switzerland) April Lynn Fohouo	001 (yellow card)
(Romania) Serafima Moscalu	000

Round of 16
(Croatia) Lara Cvjetko	001 (yellow card)
(Belgium) Gabriella Willems	000
(France) Margaux Pinot	001 (yellow card)
(Switzerland) April Lynn Fohouo	000 (yellow card)

Quarter-finals
(Croatia) Lara Cvjetko	100
(France) Margaux Pinot	000

=== Pool B ===
First round
(South Korea) Lee Ye-rang	000
(Italy) Giorgia Stangherlin	100
(International Judo Federation) Daria Antonova	000
(Denmark) Lærke Olsen	100

Round of 32
(Australia) Aoife Coughlan	100
(Italy) Giorgia Stangherlin	000
(Lebanon) Aqulina Chayeb	001
(Mongolia) Batsuuriin Nyam-Erdene	000 (yellow card)
(Netherlands) Sanne van Dijke	001
(Brazil) Luana Carvalho	000 (yellow card)
(Denmark) Lærke Olsen	000
(Madagascar) Aina Laura Rasoanaivo Razafy	100

Round of 16
(Australia) Aoife Coughlan	100 (yellow card)
(Lebanon) Aqulina Chayeb	000 (yellow card)
(Netherlands) Sanne van Dijke	100 (yellow card)
(Madagascar) Aina Laura Rasoanaivo Razafy	000 (yellow card)

Quarter-finals
(Australia) Aoife Coughlan	100
(Netherlands) Sanne van Dijke	000 (yellow card)

=== Pool C ===
First round
(Italy) Irene Pedrotti	020
(United States) Melissa Myers	000
(Switzerland) Gioia Vetterli	000
(Slovenia) Kaja Schuster	100
(Netherlands) Margit de Voogd	001 (yellow card)
(Austria) Elena Dengg	000

Round of 32
(Germany) Miriam Butkereit	100
(Italy) Irene Pedrotti	000
(China) Yu Dan	000 (yellow card)
(Bosnia and Herzegovina) Aleksandra Samardžić	010
(Japan) Shiho Tanaka	100
(Slovenia) Kaja Schuster	000
(Netherlands) Margit de Voogd	000
(Portugal) Tais Pina	001 (yellow card)

Round of 16
(Germany) Miriam Butkereit	001 (yellow card)
(Bosnia and Herzegovina) Aleksandra Samardžić	000
(Japan) Shiho Tanaka	010 (yellow card)
(Portugal) Tais Pina	000

Quarter-finals
(Germany) Miriam Butkereit	000
(Japan) Shiho Tanaka	001 (yellow card)

=== Pool D ===
First round
(Hungary) Szofi Özbas	020
(Mongolia) Darkhanbatbayaryn Yesüi	000 (yellow card)
(United Kingdom) Kelly Petersen Pollard	020
(Peru) Xsara Morales Falconi	000

Round of 32
(Spain) Ai Tsunoda	100
(International Judo Federation) Madina Taimazova	000
(Hungary) Szofi Özbas	110
(Poland) Katarzyna Sobierajska	000 (yellow card)
(Greece) Elisavet Teltsidou	100
(United Kingdom) Kelly Petersen Pollard	000
(Chinese Taipei) Liao Yu-jung	000
(Uzbekistan) Khurshida Razzokberdieva	010 (yellow card)

Round of 16
(Spain) Ai Tsunoda	100 (yellow card)
(Hungary) Szofi Özbas	000
(Greece) Elisavet Teltsidou	001
(Uzbekistan) Khurshida Razzokberdieva	000 (yellow card)

Quarter-finals
(Spain) Ai Tsunoda	010
(Greece) Elisavet Teltsidou	000

== Prize money ==
The sums listed bring the total prizes awarded to €57,000 for the individual event.

Medal	Total	Judoka	Coach
Gold	€26,000	€20,800	€5,200
Silver	€15,000	€12,000	€3,000
Bronze	€8,000	€6,400	€1,600
