= Judo at the 2022 Mediterranean Games – Women's 70 kg =

Judo competitions

Judo Women's 70 kg at the 2022 Mediterranean Games
- Venue: Mohammed Ben Ahmed Convention Centre – Hall 03 and 06
- Location: Oran, Algeria
- Date: 30 June
- Competitors: 11 from 11 nations

Medalists
gold medal	Ai Tsunoda	Spain
silver medal	Nihel Landolsi	Tunisia
bronze medal	Elisavet Teltsidou	Greece
bronze medal	Martina Esposito	Italy

The women's 70 kg competition in judo at the 2022 Mediterranean Games was held on 30 June at the Mohammed Ben Ahmed Convention Centre in Oran.

== Results ==
=== Main bracket ===
Round of 16
Minel Akdeniz (TUR)	00
Joana Crisóstomo (POR)	10
Souad Bellakehal (ALG)	00
Aleksandra Samardžić (BIH)	10
Kaïla Issoufi (FRA)	00
Martina Esposito (ITA)	01

Quarterfinals
Lara Cvjetko (CRO)	10
Joana Crisóstomo (POR)	00
Nihel Landolsi (TUN)	01
Elisavet Teltsidou (GRE)	00
Ai Tsunoda (ESP)	01
Aleksandra Samardžić (BIH)	00
Anka Pogačnik (SLO)	10
Martina Esposito (ITA)	00

Semifinals
Lara Cvjetko (CRO)	00
Nihel Landolsi (TUN)	10
Ai Tsunoda (ESP)	10
Anka Pogačnik (SLO)	00

Final
Nihel Landolsi (TUN)	00
Ai Tsunoda (ESP)	10

=== Repechage ===
Repechage
Joana Crisóstomo (POR)	01
Elisavet Teltsidou (GRE)	10
Aleksandra Samardžić (BIH)	00
Martina Esposito (ITA)	10

Bronze medal
Elisavet Teltsidou (GRE)	10
Anka Pogačnik (SLO)	00
Martina Esposito (ITA)	10
Lara Cvjetko (CRO)	00
