= Judo at the 2024 Summer Olympics – Women's 70 kg =

Judo Women's 70 kg at the Games of the XXXIII Olympiad
- Venue: Grand Palais Éphémère
- Location: Paris, France
- Date: 31 July 2024
- Competitors: 24 from 24 nations
- Website: Official website

Medalists
gold medal	Barbara Matić (1st title)	Croatia
silver medal	Miriam Butkereit	Germany
bronze medal	Michaela Polleres	Austria
bronze medal	Gabriella Willems	Belgium

Competition at external databases
- Links: IJF • JudoInside

The Women's 70 kg event in Judo at the 2024 Summer Olympics was held at the Grand Palais Éphémère in Paris, France on 31 July 2024.

== Summary ==
This is the ninth appearance of the women's middleweight category.

Chizuru Arai did not participate in this edition as she retired from judo in September 2021, Michaela Polleres lost to potentially silver medalist Miriam Butkereit, later, Polleres won a bronze medal by beating Ai Tsunoda, one of the bronze medalists, Madina Taimazova failed to qualify due to the IOC barred Russian Olympic Committee (ROC) due to war in Ukraine, Sanne van Dijke lost to eventual champion Barbara Matić, later, van Dijke lost to Gabriella Willems in the bronze medal match.

== Results ==
=== Finals ===
Semi-finals
Barbara Matić (CRO)	10
Sanne van Dijke (NED)	00 (yellow card)
Miriam Butkereit (GER)	10
Michaela Polleres (AUT)	00

Final
Barbara Matić (CRO)	01 (yellow card)
Miriam Butkereit (GER)	00

=== Repechage ===
Repechage
Ai Tsunoda (ESP)	10 (yellow card)
Saki Niizoe (JPN)	00
Gabriella Willems (BEL)	10
Marie-Ève Gahié (FRA)	00

Bronze medal
Ai Tsunoda (ESP)	00
Michaela Polleres (AUT)	10 (yellow card)
Gabriella Willems (BEL)	01
Sanne van Dijke (NED)	00

=== Pool A ===
First round
Kim Polling (ITA)	01
Tais Pina (POR)	00
Anka Pogačnik (SLO)	10
Demos Memneloum (CHA)	00

Round of 16
Barbara Matić (CRO)	10
Kim Polling (ITA)	00
Ai Tsunoda (ESP)	01
Anka Pogačnik (SLO)	00

Quarter-finals
Barbara Matić (CRO)	10
Ai Tsunoda (ESP)	00

=== Pool B ===
First round
Aleksandra Samardžić (BIH)	10 (yellow card)
Lærke Olsen (DEN)	00
Gulnoza Matniyazova (UZB)	10
Mun Song-hui (PRK)	00

Round of 16
Sanne van Dijke (NED)	10 (yellow card)
Aleksandra Samardžić (BIH)	00
Saki Niizoe (JPN)	10
Gulnoza Matniyazova (UZB)	00 (yellow card)

Quarter-finals
Sanne van Dijke (NED)	01
Saki Niizoe (JPN)	00

=== Pool C ===
First round
Gabriella Willems (BEL)	10
María Pérez (PUR)	00
Aoife Coughlan (AUS)	01 (yellow card)
Szabina Gercsák (HUN)	00

Round of 16
Elisavet Teltsidou (GRE)	00 (yellow card)
Gabriella Willems (BEL)	10
Miriam Butkereit (GER)	10
Aoife Coughlan (AUS)	00

Quarter-finals
Gabriella Willems (BEL)	00
Miriam Butkereit (GER)	10 (yellow card)

=== Pool D ===
First round
Aina Laura Rasoanaivo Razafy (MAD)	00 (yellow card)
Katie-Jemima Yeats-Brown (GBR)	01
Maya Goshen (ISR)	10 (yellow card)
Fidan Ögel (TUR)	00

Round of 16
Michaela Polleres (AUT)	01
Katie-Jemima Yeats-Brown (GBR)	00
Marie-Ève Gahié (FRA)	10 (yellow card)
Maya Goshen (ISR)	00

Quarter-finals
Michaela Polleres (AUT)	10
Marie-Ève Gahié (FRA)	00
