= Shokhista Nazarova =

Uzbekistani judoka

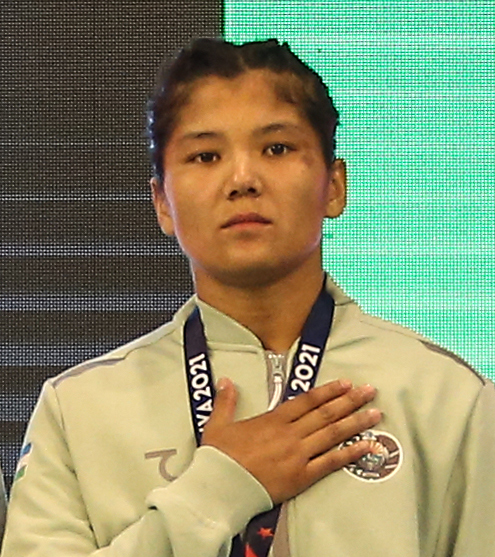
- Nazarova in 2022

Personal information
- Born: 24 April 1999 (age 27)
- Occupation: Judoka

Sport
- Country: Uzbekistan
- Sport: Judo
- Weight class: ‍–‍70 kg

Achievements and titles
- World Champ.: R16 (2023)
- Asian Champ.: (bronze) (2022, 2024)
Medal record
Women's judo
Representing Uzbekistan
Asian Championships
Bronze medal – third place	2022 Nur‑Sultan	‍–‍70 kg
Bronze medal – third place	2024 Hong Kong	‍–‍70 kg
Islamic Solidarity Games
Bronze medal – third place	2021 Konya	‍–‍70 kg

Profile at external databases
- IJF: 41803
- JudoInside.com: 106749
- Updated on 26 April 2024

Shokhista Nazarova is an Uzbekistani judoka. She won a bronze medal at the 2021 Islamic Solidarity Games held in Konya, Turkey. She also won a bronze medals at the 2022 Asian Judo Championships held in Nur-Sultan, Kazakhstan and at the 2024 Asian Judo Championships held in Hong Kong, China.

Nazarova competed in the women's 70 kg event at the 2018 World Judo Championships held in Baku, Azerbaijan. She also competed in the women's 70 kg event at the 2022 World Judo Championships held in Tashkent, Uzbekistan. In 2023, Nazarova competed in the women's 70 kg and mixed team events at the World Judo Championships held in Doha, Qatar.

== Achievements ==
Year	Tournament	Place	Weight class
2022	Asian Judo Championships	3rd	−70 kg
2022	Islamic Solidarity Games	3rd	−70 kg
2024	Asian Judo Championships	3rd	−70 kg
