= 2023 Judo Grand Prix Zagreb =

Judo Competition

Judo 2023 Judo Grand Prix Zagreb
- Venue: Arena Zagreb
- Location: Zagreb, Croatia
- Dates: 18–20 August 2023
- Competitors: 530 from 83 nations
- Total prize money: €98,000

Competition at external databases
- Links: IJF • JudoInside

The 2023 Judo Grand Prix Zagreb was held at the Arena Zagreb in Zagreb, Croatia, from 18 to 20 August 2023 as part of the IJF World Tour and during the 2024 Summer Olympics qualification period.

== Medal summary ==
=== Men's events ===
Event	Gold	Silver	Bronze
Extra-lightweight (−60 kg)	Dilshot Khalmatov (UKR)	Ahmad Yusifov (AZE)	Salih Yıldız (TUR)
Extra-lightweight (−60 kg)	Dilshot Khalmatov (UKR)	Ahmad Yusifov (AZE)	Theo Raoul Hebrard (FRA)
Half-lightweight (−66 kg)	Willian Lima (BRA)	Sardor Nurillaev (UZB)	Aibolat Ystybay (KAZ)
Half-lightweight (−66 kg)	Willian Lima (BRA)	Sardor Nurillaev (UZB)	Mukhriddin Tilovov (UZB)
Lightweight (−73 kg)	Jorge Cano García (ESP)	Messaoud Dris (ALG)	Martin Hojak (SLO)
Lightweight (−73 kg)	Jorge Cano García (ESP)	Messaoud Dris (ALG)	Bakhitzhan Abdurakhmanov (KAZ)
Half-middleweight (−81 kg)	Sagi Muki (ISR)	Medickson del Orbe (DOM)	Askerbii Gerbekov (BHR)
Half-middleweight (−81 kg)	Sagi Muki (ISR)	Medickson del Orbe (DOM)	Mykhailo Svidrak (UKR)
Middleweight (−90 kg)	Krisztián Tóth (HUN)	Mihael Žgank (TUR)	Rafael Macedo (BRA)
Middleweight (−90 kg)	Krisztián Tóth (HUN)	Mihael Žgank (TUR)	Sami Chouchi (BEL)
Half-heavyweight (−100 kg)	Aleksandar Kukolj (SRB)	Jorge Fonseca (POR)	Simeon Catharina (NED)
Half-heavyweight (−100 kg)	Aleksandar Kukolj (SRB)	Jorge Fonseca (POR)	Leonardo Gonçalves (BRA)
Heavyweight (+100 kg)	Lukáš Krpálek (CZE)	Hyōga Ōta (JPN)	Erik Abramov (GER)
Heavyweight (+100 kg)	Lukáš Krpálek (CZE)	Hyōga Ōta (JPN)	Ushangi Kokauri (AZE)

=== Women's events ===
Event	Gold	Silver	Bronze
Extra-lightweight (−48 kg)	Mireia Lapuerta Comas (ESP)	Milica Nikolić (SRB)	Maruša Štangar (SLO)
Extra-lightweight (−48 kg)	Mireia Lapuerta Comas (ESP)	Milica Nikolić (SRB)	Laura Martínez (ESP)
Half-lightweight (−52 kg)	Jéssica Pereira (BRA)	Soumiya Iraoui (MAR)	Mio Huh (KOR)
Half-lightweight (−52 kg)	Jéssica Pereira (BRA)	Soumiya Iraoui (MAR)	Mascha Ballhaus (GER)
Lightweight (−57 kg)	Marica Perišić (SRB)	Veronica Toniolo (ITA)	Daria Bilodid (UKR)
Lightweight (−57 kg)	Marica Perišić (SRB)	Veronica Toniolo (ITA)	Kaja Kajzer (SLO)
Half-middleweight (−63 kg)	Lucy Renshall (GBR)	Kim Ji-su (KOR)	Lubjana Piovesana (AUT)
Half-middleweight (−63 kg)	Lucy Renshall (GBR)	Kim Ji-su (KOR)	Prisca Awiti Alcaraz (MEX)
Middleweight (−70 kg)	Lara Cvjetko (CRO)	Barbara Matić (CRO)	Irene Pedrotti (ITA)
Middleweight (−70 kg)	Lara Cvjetko (CRO)	Barbara Matić (CRO)	Anka Pogačnik (SLO)
Half-heavyweight (−78 kg)	Karol Gimenes (BRA)	Yuliia Kurchenko (UKR)	Alina Böhm (GER)
Half-heavyweight (−78 kg)	Karol Gimenes (BRA)	Yuliia Kurchenko (UKR)	Anna-Maria Wagner (GER)
Heavyweight (+78 kg)	Kayra Sayit (TUR)	Milica Žabić (SRB)	Hilal Öztürk (TUR)
Heavyweight (+78 kg)	Kayra Sayit (TUR)	Milica Žabić (SRB)	Sydnee Andrews (NZL)

Source results:

=== Medal table ===
* Host nation (Croatia)

Rank	Nation	Gold	Silver	Bronze	Total
1	Brazil (BRA)	3	0	2	5
2	Serbia (SRB)	2	2	0	4
3	Spain (ESP)	2	0	1	3
4	Turkey (TUR)	1	1	2	4
4	Ukraine (UKR)	1	1	2	4
6	Croatia (CRO)*	1	1	0	2
7	Czech Republic (CZE)	1	0	0	1
7	Great Britain (GBR)	1	0	0	1
7	Hungary (HUN)	1	0	0	1
7	Israel (ISR)	1	0	0	1
11	Azerbaijan (AZE)	0	1	1	2
11	Italy (ITA)	0	1	1	2
11	South Korea (KOR)	0	1	1	2
11	Uzbekistan (UZB)	0	1	1	2
15	Algeria (ALG)	0	1	0	1
15	Dominican Republic (DOM)	0	1	0	1
15	Japan (JPN)	0	1	0	1
15	Morocco (MAR)	0	1	0	1
15	Portugal (POR)	0	1	0	1
20	Germany (GER)	0	0	4	4
20	Slovenia (SLO)	0	0	4	4
22	Kazakhstan (KAZ)	0	0	2	2
23	Austria (AUT)	0	0	1	1
23	Bahrain (BHR)	0	0	1	1
23	Belgium (BEL)	0	0	1	1
23	France (FRA)	0	0	1	1
23	Mexico (MEX)	0	0	1	1
23	Netherlands (NED)	0	0	1	1
23	New Zealand (NZL)	0	0	1	1
Totals (29 entries)		14	14	28	56

== Prize money ==
The sums written are per medalist, bringing the total prizes awarded to €98,000. (retrieved from:)

Medal	Total	Judoka	Coach
Gold	€3,000	€2,400	€600
Silver	€2,000	€1,600	€400
Bronze	€1,000	€800	€200
