= 2010 European Cadet Judo Championships =

Judo competition

Judo 2010 European Cadet Judo Championships
- Venue: Na Stínadlech
- Location: Teplice, Czech Republic
- Dates: 2–4 July 2010

Competition at external databases
- Links: JudoInside

The 2010 European Cadet Judo Championships were an edition of the European Cadet Judo Championships, organised by the International Judo Federation. They were held in Teplice, in the Czech Republic from 2 to 4 July 2010.

== Medal summary ==
=== Medal table ===
* Host nation (Czech Republic)

Rank	Nation	Gold	Silver	Bronze	Total
1	Russia (RUS)	5	2	4	11
2	Italy (ITA)	2	1	4	7
3	Ukraine (UKR)	1	4	1	6
4	Spain (ESP)	1	2	1	4
5	Germany (GER)	1	1	3	5
6	Bulgaria (BUL)	1	1	0	2
6	Croatia (CRO)	1	1	0	2
8	Azerbaijan (AZE)	1	0	1	2
8	Netherlands (NED)	1	0	1	2
10	Poland (POL)	1	0	0	1
10	Turkey (TUR)	1	0	0	1
12	Austria (AUT)	0	1	2	3
12	Hungary (HUN)	0	1	2	3
14	France (FRA)	0	1	1	2
14	Georgia (GEO)	0	1	1	2
16	Belarus (BLR)	0	0	2	2
16	Latvia (LAT)	0	0	2	2
18	Belgium (BEL)	0	0	1	1
18	Estonia (EST)	0	0	1	1
18	Montenegro (MNE)	0	0	1	1
18	Portugal (POR)	0	0	1	1
18	Romania (ROU)	0	0	1	1
18	Serbia (SRB)	0	0	1	1
18	Sweden (SWE)	0	0	1	1
Totals (24 entries)		16	16	32	64

=== Men's events ===
Event	Gold	Silver	Bronze
−50 kg	Mehman Sadigov (AZE)	Yevgeniy Velychko (UKR)	Iznaur Abdulaev (RUS)
−50 kg	Mehman Sadigov (AZE)	Yevgeniy Velychko (UKR)	Vincent Manquest (FRA)
−55 kg	Sakhavat Gadzhiev (RUS)	Fabio Basile (ITA)	Pavel Hladkikh (BLR)
−55 kg	Sakhavat Gadzhiev (RUS)	Fabio Basile (ITA)	Vladislavs Staruhs (LAT)
−60 kg	Yunus-Khadzhi Khutiev (RUS)	Viktor Melenevskiy (UKR)	Mikheil Mezurnishvili (GEO)
−60 kg	Yunus-Khadzhi Khutiev (RUS)	Viktor Melenevskiy (UKR)	Huseyn Rahimli (AZE)
−66 kg	Dmitry Zuev (RUS)	Martin Végvári (HUN)	Robin Gutsche (GER)
−66 kg	Dmitry Zuev (RUS)	Martin Végvári (HUN)	Gabriele Melegari (ITA)
−73 kg	Ivaylo Ivanov (BUL)	Suleiman Vyshegurov (RUS)	Jonas Björktorp (SWE)
−73 kg	Ivaylo Ivanov (BUL)	Suleiman Vyshegurov (RUS)	Nuno Saraiva (POR)
−81 kg	Marcin Gmurek (POL)	Lasha Taveluri (GEO)	Izmail Khamkhoev (RUS)
−81 kg	Marcin Gmurek (POL)	Lasha Taveluri (GEO)	Krisztián Tóth (HUN)
−90 kg	Max de Vreeze (NED)	Daniil Mileshkyn (UKR)	Nicolas Damico (ITA)
−90 kg	Max de Vreeze (NED)	Daniil Mileshkyn (UKR)	Glebs Talalujevs (LAT)
+90 kg	Kurban Yakubov (RUS)	Javier Eizaguirre (ESP)	Paul Elm (GER)
+90 kg	Kurban Yakubov (RUS)	Javier Eizaguirre (ESP)	Hennrich Sildveer (EST)

=== Women's events ===
Event	Gold	Silver	Bronze
−40 kg	Irina Dolgova (RUS)	Borislava Damyanova (BUL)	Jackie Groenen (NED)
−40 kg	Irina Dolgova (RUS)	Borislava Damyanova (BUL)	Vita Valnova (BLR)
−44 kg	Angelina Bombara (ITA)	Sarah Vogel (GER)	Olga Smolska (UKR)
−44 kg	Angelina Bombara (ITA)	Sarah Vogel (GER)	Sarah Strohmayer (AUT)
−48 kg	Odette Giuffrida (ITA)	Nicole Kaiser (AUT)	Evgenia Demintseva (RUS)
−48 kg	Odette Giuffrida (ITA)	Nicole Kaiser (AUT)	Alexandra Pop (ROU)
−52 kg	Nataliya Ilkiv (UKR)	Zarina Babinyan (RUS)	Nica Antonis (BEL)
−52 kg	Nataliya Ilkiv (UKR)	Zarina Babinyan (RUS)	Katinka Szabó (HUN)
−57 kg	Dilara Incedayi (TUR)	Ana Kokeza (CRO)	Tamara Djurdjevac (MNE)
−57 kg	Dilara Incedayi (TUR)	Ana Kokeza (CRO)	Maider Palavecino (ESP)
−63 kg	Barbara Matić (CRO)	Margaux Pinot (FRA)	Miriam Butkereit (GER)
−63 kg	Barbara Matić (CRO)	Margaux Pinot (FRA)	Magdalena Krssakova (AUT)
−70 kg	Lisa Schneider (GER)	Andrea Sebastian (ESP)	Melora Rosetta (ITA)
−70 kg	Lisa Schneider (GER)	Andrea Sebastian (ESP)	Una Tuba (SRB)
+70 kg	Aroa Martín Lara (ESP)	Anastasiia Komovych (UKR)	Iuliia Lianichenko (RUS)
+70 kg	Aroa Martín Lara (ESP)	Anastasiia Komovych (UKR)	Giuseppina Macri I (ITA)

Source Results
