= 2025 Judo Grand Slam Baku =

Judo competition

Judo 2025 Judo Grand Slam Baku
- Venue: National Gymnastics Arena
- Location: Baku, Azerbaijan
- Dates: 14–16 February 2025
- Competitors: 258 from 36 nations
- Total prize money: €154,000

Competition at external databases
- Links: IJF • JudoInside

The 2025 Judo Grand Slam Baku was a Judo Grand Slam tournament held at the National Gymnastics Arena in Baku, Azerbaijan, from 14 to 16 February 2025 as part of the IJF World Tour.

== Medal summary ==
=== Men's events ===
Event	Gold	Silver	Bronze
Extra-lightweight (−60 kg)	Ryuju Nagayama (JPN)	Taiki Nakamura (JPN)	Jorre Verstraeten (BEL)
Extra-lightweight (−60 kg)	Ryuju Nagayama (JPN)	Taiki Nakamura (JPN)	Ahmad Yusifov (AZE)
Half-lightweight (−66 kg)	Takeshi Takeoka (JPN)	Ryoma Tanaka (JPN)	Ivan Chernykh (IJF)
Half-lightweight (−66 kg)	Takeshi Takeoka (JPN)	Ryoma Tanaka (JPN)	Elshan Asadov (AZE)
Lightweight (−73 kg)	Tatsuki Ishihara (JPN)	Rashid Mammadaliyev (AZE)	Vusal Galandarzade (AZE)
Lightweight (−73 kg)	Tatsuki Ishihara (JPN)	Rashid Mammadaliyev (AZE)	Abubakr Sherov (TJK)
Half-middleweight (−81 kg)	Zelim Tckaev (AZE)	François Gauthier-Drapeau (CAN)	Askerbii Gerbekov (BHR)
Half-middleweight (−81 kg)	Zelim Tckaev (AZE)	François Gauthier-Drapeau (CAN)	Egor Sukhoparov (IJF)
Middleweight (−90 kg)	Sanshiro Murao (JPN)	Marcelo Gomes (BRA)	Frank de Wit (NED)
Middleweight (−90 kg)	Sanshiro Murao (JPN)	Marcelo Gomes (BRA)	Kenny Komi Bedel (ITA)
Half-heavyweight (−100 kg)	Dota Arai (JPN)	Leonardo Gonçalves (BRA)	Dzhakhongir Madzhidov (TJK)
Half-heavyweight (−100 kg)	Dota Arai (JPN)	Leonardo Gonçalves (BRA)	Niyaz Bilalov (IJF)
Heavyweight (+100 kg)	Hyōga Ōta (JPN)	Tamerlan Bashaev (IJF)	Yerassyl Kazhibayev (KAZ)
Heavyweight (+100 kg)	Hyōga Ōta (JPN)	Tamerlan Bashaev (IJF)	Kanta Nakano (JPN)

Source results:

=== Women's events ===
Event	Gold	Silver	Bronze
Extra-lightweight (−48 kg)	Natsumi Tsunoda (JPN)	Tara Babulfath (SWE)	Eva Pérez Soler (ESP)
Extra-lightweight (−48 kg)	Natsumi Tsunoda (JPN)	Tara Babulfath (SWE)	Andrea Stojadinov (SRB)
Half-lightweight (−52 kg)	Uta Abe (JPN)	Mascha Ballhaus (GER)	Hwang Sur-yeon (KOR)
Half-lightweight (−52 kg)	Uta Abe (JPN)	Mascha Ballhaus (GER)	Ayumi Leiva Sánchez (ESP)
Lightweight (−57 kg)	Momo Tamaoki (JPN)	Ayami Takano (JPN)	Seija Ballhaus (GER)
Lightweight (−57 kg)	Momo Tamaoki (JPN)	Ayami Takano (JPN)	Marica Perišić (SRB)
Half-middleweight (−63 kg)	Jessica Klimkait (CAN)	Minami Aono (JPN)	Lubjana Piovesana (AUT)
Half-middleweight (−63 kg)	Jessica Klimkait (CAN)	Minami Aono (JPN)	Natalia Kropska (POL)
Middleweight (−70 kg)	Szofi Özbas (HUN)	Serafima Moscalu (ROU)	Shiho Tanaka (JPN)
Middleweight (−70 kg)	Szofi Özbas (HUN)	Serafima Moscalu (ROU)	Lara Cvjetko (CRO)
Half-heavyweight (−78 kg)	Anna Monta Olek (GER)	Alina Böhm (GER)	Elisavet Teltsidou (GRE)
Half-heavyweight (−78 kg)	Anna Monta Olek (GER)	Alina Böhm (GER)	Mami Umeki (JPN)
Heavyweight (+78 kg)	Ruri Takahashi (JPN)	Hilal Öztürk (TUR)	Marit Kamps (NED)
Heavyweight (+78 kg)	Ruri Takahashi (JPN)	Hilal Öztürk (TUR)	Helena Vuković (CRO)

Source results:

=== Medal table ===
* Host nation (Azerbaijan)

Rank	Nation	Gold	Silver	Bronze	Total
1	Japan (JPN)	10	4	3	17
2	Germany (GER)	1	2	1	4
3	Azerbaijan (AZE)*	1	1	3	5
4	Canada (CAN)	1	1	0	2
5	Hungary (HUN)	1	0	0	1
6	Brazil (BRA)	0	2	0	2
–	International Judo Federation (IJF)	0	1	3	4
7	Romania (ROU)	0	1	0	1
7	Sweden (SWE)	0	1	0	1
7	Turkey (TUR)	0	1	0	1
10	Croatia (CRO)	0	0	2	2
10	Netherlands (NED)	0	0	2	2
10	Serbia (SRB)	0	0	2	2
10	Spain (ESP)	0	0	2	2
10	Tajikistan (TJK)	0	0	2	2
15	Austria (AUT)	0	0	1	1
15	Bahrain (BHR)	0	0	1	1
15	Belgium (BEL)	0	0	1	1
15	Greece (GRE)	0	0	1	1
15	Italy (ITA)	0	0	1	1
15	Kazakhstan (KAZ)	0	0	1	1
15	Poland (POL)	0	0	1	1
15	South Korea (KOR)	0	0	1	1
Totals (22 entries)		14	14	28	56

== Prize money ==
The sums written are per medalist, bringing the total prizes awarded to €154,000. (retrieved from:)

Medal	Total	Judoka	Coach
Gold	€5,000	€4,000	€1,000
Silver	€3,000	€2,400	€600
Bronze	€1,500	€1,200	€300
