= Judo at the 2018 Asian Games – Women's 70 kg =

Judo competition

Women's 70 kg at the 2018 Asian Games
- Venue: Jakarta Convention Center
- Date: 30 August 2018
- Competitors: 15 from 15 nations

Medalists
| gold medal | Saki Niizoe | Japan |
| silver medal | Kim Seong-yeon | South Korea |
| bronze medal | Gulnoza Matniyazova | Uzbekistan |
| bronze medal | Tsend-Ayuushiin Naranjargal | Mongolia |

The women's 70 kilograms (Middleweight) competition at the 2018 Asian Games in Jakarta was held on 30 August at the Jakarta Convention Center Assembly Hall.

Saki Niizoe of Japan won the gold medal.

== Schedule ==
All times are Western Indonesia Time (UTC+07:00)

| Date | Time | Event |
|---|---|---|
| Thursday, 30 August 2018 | 09:00 | Elimination round of 16 |
| Thursday, 30 August 2018 | 09:00 | Quarterfinals |
| Thursday, 30 August 2018 | 09:00 | Repechage |
| Thursday, 30 August 2018 | 09:00 | Semifinals |
| Thursday, 30 August 2018 | 16:00 | Finals |

== Results ==
=== Main bracket ===
Elimination round of 16
Zhu Ya (CHN) | 10
Donya Aghaei (IRI) | 00
Zere Bektaskyzy (KAZ) | 10
Nguyễn Thị Diệu Tiên (VIE) | 00
Kwon Sun-yong (PRK) | 01
Huang Yi-ting (TPE) | 00
Gulnoza Matniyazova (UZB) | 10
Garima Chaudhary (IND) | 00
Tsend-Ayuushiin Naranjargal (MGL) | 10
Aizhan Kadyrbekova (KGZ) | 00
Kim Seong-yeon (KOR) | 11
Hevrilia Windawati (INA) | 00
Mariya Takahashi (PHI) | 10
Surattana Thongsri (THA) | 00

Quarterfinals
Saki Niizoe (JPN) | 10
Zhu Ya (CHN) | 00
Zere Bektaskyzy (KAZ) | 01
Kwon Sun-yong (PRK) | 00
Gulnoza Matniyazova (UZB) | 11
Tsend-Ayuushiin Naranjargal (MGL) | 00
Kim Seong-yeon (KOR) | 11
Mariya Takahashi (PHI) | 00

Semifinals
Saki Niizoe (JPN) | 10
Zere Bektaskyzy (KAZ) | 00
Gulnoza Matniyazova (UZB) | 00
Kim Seong-yeon (KOR) | 01

Gold medal contest
Saki Niizoe (JPN) | 01
Kim Seong-yeon (KOR) | 00

=== Repechage ===
Repechage
Zhu Ya (CHN) | 01
Kwon Sun-yong (PRK) | 00
Tsend-Ayuushiin Naranjargal (MGL) | 10
Mariya Takahashi (PHI) | 00

Bronze medal contests
Zhu Ya (CHN) | 00
Gulnoza Matniyazova (UZB) | 10
Tsend-Ayuushiin Naranjargal (MGL) | 10
Zere Bektaskyzy (KAZ) | 00
