= 2013 European Cadet Judo Championships =

Judo competition

Judo 2013 European Cadet Judo Championships
- Venue: Unibet Arena
- Location: Tallinn, Estonia
- Dates: 21–23 June 2013

Competition at external databases
- Links: JudoInside

The 2013 European Cadet Judo Championships is an edition of the European Cadet Judo Championships, organised by the International Judo Federation. It was held in Tallinn, Estonia from 21 to 23 June 2013.

== Medal summary ==
=== Medal table ===
* Host nation (Estonia)

Rank	Nation	Gold	Silver	Bronze	Total
1	Russia (RUS)	5	1	3	9
2	France (FRA)	3	1	0	4
3	Azerbaijan (AZE)	2	2	2	6
4	Italy (ITA)	2	0	2	4
5	Georgia (GEO)	1	0	5	6
6	Romania (ROU)	1	0	3	4
7	Hungary (HUN)	1	0	0	1
7	Kosovo (KOS)	1	0	0	1
9	Netherlands (NED)	0	4	3	7
10	Ukraine (UKR)	0	2	1	3
11	Serbia (SRB)	0	1	1	2
11	Slovenia (SLO)	0	1	1	2
11	Turkey (TUR)	0	1	1	2
14	Bosnia and Herzegovina (BIH)	0	1	0	1
14	Lithuania (LTU)	0	1	0	1
14	Poland (POL)	0	1	0	1
17	Great Britain (GBR)	0	0	3	3
18	Israel (ISR)	0	0	2	2
19	Austria (AUT)	0	0	1	1
19	Croatia (CRO)	0	0	1	1
19	Estonia (EST)*	0	0	1	1
19	Germany (GER)	0	0	1	1
19	Montenegro (MNE)	0	0	1	1
Totals (23 entries)		16	16	32	64

=== Men's events ===
Event	Gold	Silver	Bronze
−50 kg	Angelo Pantano (ITA)	Matthijs van Harten (NED)	Natig Gurbanli (AZE)
−50 kg	Angelo Pantano (ITA)	Matthijs van Harten (NED)	Robinzon Beglarashvili (GEO)
−55 kg	Elios Manzi (ITA)	Ilkin Babazada (AZE)	Peter Miles (GBR)
−55 kg	Elios Manzi (ITA)	Ilkin Babazada (AZE)	Rufat Taghizade (AZE)
−60 kg	Hidayat Heydarov (AZE)	Bogdan Iadov (UKR)	Daniel Ben David (ISR)
−60 kg	Hidayat Heydarov (AZE)	Bogdan Iadov (UKR)	Neil MacDonald (GBR)
−66 kg	Akil Gjakova (KOS)	Elnur Ahmadli (AZE)	Strahinja Bunčić (SRB)
−66 kg	Akil Gjakova (KOS)	Elnur Ahmadli (AZE)	Koba Mchedlishvili (GEO)
−73 kg	Ruslan Godizov (RUS)	Nemanja Majdov (SRB)	Tamazi Kirakozashvili (GEO)
−73 kg	Ruslan Godizov (RUS)	Nemanja Majdov (SRB)	Arso Milic (MNE)
−81 kg	Mikhail Igolnikov (RUS)	Frank de Wit (NED)	Mattias Kuusik (EST)
−81 kg	Mikhail Igolnikov (RUS)	Frank de Wit (NED)	Maximilian Schneider (AUT)
−90 kg	Karlen Palyan (RUS)	Rokas Nenartavicius (LTU)	Daviti Ramazashvili (GEO)
−90 kg	Karlen Palyan (RUS)	Rokas Nenartavicius (LTU)	Zelym Kotsoiev (UKR)
+90 kg	Ruslan Shakhbazov (RUS)	Tamerlan Bashaev (RUS)	Luca Kunszabo (ROU)
+90 kg	Ruslan Shakhbazov (RUS)	Tamerlan Bashaev (RUS)	Mircea Croitoru (ROU)

=== Women's events ===
Event	Gold	Silver	Bronze
−40 kg	Leyla Aliyeva (AZE)	Marine Gilly (FRA)	Sarah Herrmann (GER)
−40 kg	Leyla Aliyeva (AZE)	Marine Gilly (FRA)	Aniek Norder (NED)
−44 kg	Anastasiya Turcheva (RUS)	Rabia Senyayla (TUR)	Melisa Çakmaklı (TUR)
−44 kg	Anastasiya Turcheva (RUS)	Rabia Senyayla (TUR)	Amber Gersjes (NED)
−48 kg	Eloise Combeau (FRA)	Andreja Leški (SLO)	Mzia Beboshvili (GEO)
−48 kg	Eloise Combeau (FRA)	Andreja Leški (SLO)	Kristina Shilova (RUS)
−52 kg	Mariam Janashvili (GEO)	Fleur Den Dekker (NED)	Theodora Balasoiu (ROU)
−52 kg	Mariam Janashvili (GEO)	Fleur Den Dekker (NED)	Inbal Shemesh (ISR)
−57 kg	Stefania Adelina Dobre (ROU)	Yuliya Khramova (UKR)	Jodie Caller (GBR)
−57 kg	Stefania Adelina Dobre (ROU)	Yuliya Khramova (UKR)	Gaby De By (NED)
−63 kg	Szabina Gercsák (HUN)	Lisa Müllenberg (NED)	Patricija Brolih (SLO)
−63 kg	Szabina Gercsák (HUN)	Lisa Müllenberg (NED)	Chiara Carminucci (ITA)
−70 kg	Marie-Ève Gahié (FRA)	Aleksandra Samardzic (BIH)	Brigita Matić-Ljuba (CRO)
−70 kg	Marie-Ève Gahié (FRA)	Aleksandra Samardzic (BIH)	Ekaterina N Tokareva (RUS)
+70 kg	Morgane Duchene (FRA)	Kamila Pasternak (POL)	Eleonora Geri (ITA)
+70 kg	Morgane Duchene (FRA)	Kamila Pasternak (POL)	Kristina Usova (RUS)

Source Results
