= 2022 World Judo Championships =

Judo competition

2022 Judo World Judo Championships
- Venue: Humo Arena
- Location: Tashkent, Uzbekistan
- Dates: 6–13 October 2022
- Competitors: 571 from 82 nations
- Total prize money: €998,000

Champions
- Mixed team: Japan (5th title)

Competition at external databases
- Links: IJF • EJU • JudoInside

The 2022 World Judo Championships was held at the Humo Ice Dome in Tashkent, Uzbekistan, from 6 to 13 October 2022 as part of the IJF World Tour and during the 2024 Summer Olympics qualification period, concluding with the mixed team event on its final day.

== Scheduling ==
The competition was originally scheduled to take place from 7 to 14 August 2022. Having been postponed by two months, its newly initially rescheduled third and fourth day would have coincided with Yom Kippur. Moshe Ponte, President of the Israel Judo Association cited this new schedule as problematic, saying that he would "handle it" with the International Judo Federation. Two days later, it was published that the competition will be postponed by an extra four days.

== Schedule ==
All times are local (UTC+5).
The event aired freely on the live.ijf.org website.

Day	Date	Weight classes		Preliminaries	Final Block
Day	Date	Men	Women	Preliminaries	Final Block
1	6 October	60 kg	48 kg	10:30	17:00
2	7 October	66 kg	52 kg	10:30	17:00
3	8 October	73 kg	57 kg	10:00	17:00
4	9 October	81 kg	63 kg	10:00	17:00
5	10 October	90 kg	70 kg	10:00	17:00
6	11 October	100 kg	78 kg	11:00	17:00
7	12 October	+100 kg	+78 kg	11:00	17:00
8	13 October	Mixed team		9:30	17:00

== Medal summary ==
=== Medal table ===
* Host nation (Uzbekistan)

Rank	Nation	Gold	Silver	Bronze	Total
1	Japan	6	4	3	13
2	Brazil	2	1	1	4
3	Uzbekistan*	2	0	0	2
4	France	1	1	3	5
5	Mongolia	1	1	1	3
6	Croatia	1	1	0	2
7	Georgia	1	0	3	4
8	Cuba	1	0	0	1
9	Canada	0	2	1	3
10	Germany	0	1	1	2
10	Italy	0	1	1	2
12	Belgium	0	1	0	1
12	China	0	1	0	1
12	Great Britain	0	1	0	1
15	Azerbaijan	0	0	2	2
15	Kazakhstan	0	0	2	2
15	Netherlands	0	0	2	2
15	South Korea	0	0	2	2
19	Austria	0	0	1	1
19	Chinese Taipei	0	0	1	1
19	Israel	0	0	1	1
19	Kosovo	0	0	1	1
19	Moldova	0	0	1	1
19	Poland	0	0	1	1
19	Portugal	0	0	1	1
19	Ukraine	0	0	1	1
Totals (26 entries)		15	15	30	60

=== Men's events ===
Event	Gold	Silver	Bronze
Extra-lightweight (60 kg)	Naohisa Takato; Japan	Enkhtaivany Ariunbold; Mongolia	Yeldos Smetov; Kazakhstan
Extra-lightweight (60 kg)	Naohisa Takato; Japan	Enkhtaivany Ariunbold; Mongolia	Yang Yung-wei; Chinese Taipei
Half-lightweight (66 kg)	Hifumi Abe; Japan	Joshiro Maruyama; Japan	An Ba-ul; South Korea
Half-lightweight (66 kg)	Hifumi Abe; Japan	Joshiro Maruyama; Japan	Denis Vieru; Moldova
Lightweight (73 kg)	Tsend-Ochiryn Tsogtbaatar; Mongolia	Soichi Hashimoto; Japan	Daniel Cargnin; Brazil
Lightweight (73 kg)	Tsend-Ochiryn Tsogtbaatar; Mongolia	Soichi Hashimoto; Japan	Hidayat Heydarov; Azerbaijan
Half-middleweight (81 kg)	Tato Grigalashvili; Georgia	Matthias Casse; Belgium	Takanori Nagase; Japan
Half-middleweight (81 kg)	Tato Grigalashvili; Georgia	Matthias Casse; Belgium	Shamil Borchashvili; Austria
Middleweight (90 kg)	Davlat Bobonov; Uzbekistan	Christian Parlati; Italy	Luka Maisuradze; Georgia
Middleweight (90 kg)	Davlat Bobonov; Uzbekistan	Christian Parlati; Italy	Lasha Bekauri; Georgia
Half-heavyweight (100 kg)	Muzaffarbek Turoboyev; Uzbekistan	Kyle Reyes; Canada	Michael Korrel; Netherlands
Half-heavyweight (100 kg)	Muzaffarbek Turoboyev; Uzbekistan	Kyle Reyes; Canada	Zelym Kotsoiev; Azerbaijan
Heavyweight (+100 kg)	Andy Granda; Cuba	Tatsuru Saito; Japan	Guram Tushishvili; Georgia
Heavyweight (+100 kg)	Andy Granda; Cuba	Tatsuru Saito; Japan	Kim Min-jong; South Korea

=== Women's events ===
Event	Gold	Silver	Bronze
Extra-lightweight (48 kg)	Natsumi Tsunoda; Japan	Katharina Menz; Germany	Assunta Scutto; Italy
Extra-lightweight (48 kg)	Natsumi Tsunoda; Japan	Katharina Menz; Germany	Abiba Abuzhakynova; Kazakhstan
Half-lightweight (52 kg)	Uta Abe; Japan	Chelsie Giles; Great Britain	Distria Krasniqi; Kosovo
Half-lightweight (52 kg)	Uta Abe; Japan	Chelsie Giles; Great Britain	Amandine Buchard; France
Lightweight (57 kg)	Rafaela Silva; Brazil	Haruka Funakubo; Japan	Jessica Klimkait; Canada
Lightweight (57 kg)	Rafaela Silva; Brazil	Haruka Funakubo; Japan	Lkhagvatogoogiin Enkhriilen; Mongolia
Half-middleweight (63 kg)	Megumi Horikawa; Japan	Catherine Beauchemin-Pinard; Canada	Manon Deketer; France
Half-middleweight (63 kg)	Megumi Horikawa; Japan	Catherine Beauchemin-Pinard; Canada	Bárbara Timo; Portugal
Middleweight (70 kg)	Barbara Matić; Croatia	Lara Cvjetko; Croatia	Saki Niizoe; Japan
Middleweight (70 kg)	Barbara Matić; Croatia	Lara Cvjetko; Croatia	Sanne van Dijke; Netherlands
Half-heavyweight (78 kg)	Mayra Aguiar; Brazil	Ma Zhenzhao; China	Yelyzaveta Lytvynenko; Ukraine
Half-heavyweight (78 kg)	Mayra Aguiar; Brazil	Ma Zhenzhao; China	Beata Pacut-Kloczko; Poland
Heavyweight (+78 kg)	Romane Dicko; France	Beatriz Souza; Brazil	Wakaba Tomita; Japan
Heavyweight (+78 kg)	Romane Dicko; France	Beatriz Souza; Brazil	Julia Tolofua; France

=== Mixed events ===
Event	Gold	Silver	Bronze
Mixed team	Japan; Haruka Funakubo; Kenshi Harada; Soichi Hashimoto; Megumi Horikawa; Kosuke Mashiyama; Saki Niizoe; Hyōga Ōta; Tatsuru Saito; Goki Tajima; Ruri Takahashi; Momo Tamaoki; Wakaba Tomita	France; Benjamin Axus; Amandine Buchard; Sarah-Léonie Cysique; Romane Dicko; Joan-Benjamin Gaba; Marie-Ève Gahié; Kenny Liveze; Alexis Mathieu; Aleksa Mitrovic; Margaux Pinot; Joseph Terhec; Julia Tolofua	Germany; Alina Böhm; Miriam Butkereit; Johannes Frey; Alexander Gabler; Sarah Mäkelburg; Dominic Ressel; Jonas Schreiber; Pauline Starke; Eduard Trippel; Anna-Maria Wagner; Igor Wandtke; Jana Ziegler
Mixed team	Japan; Haruka Funakubo; Kenshi Harada; Soichi Hashimoto; Megumi Horikawa; Kosuke Mashiyama; Saki Niizoe; Hyōga Ōta; Tatsuru Saito; Goki Tajima; Ruri Takahashi; Momo Tamaoki; Wakaba Tomita	France; Benjamin Axus; Amandine Buchard; Sarah-Léonie Cysique; Romane Dicko; Joan-Benjamin Gaba; Marie-Ève Gahié; Kenny Liveze; Alexis Mathieu; Aleksa Mitrovic; Margaux Pinot; Joseph Terhec; Julia Tolofua	Israel; Tal Flicker; Maya Goshen; Guy Gurevitch; Raz Hershko; Serafim Kompaniez; Inbar Lanir; Ido Levin; Sagi Muki; Timna Nelson-Levy; Peter Paltchik; Gefen Primo; Gili Sharir

== Prize money ==
The sums written are per medalist, bringing the total prizes awarded to €798,000 for the individual events and €200,000 for the team event. (retrieved from:)

Medal	Individual			Mixed team		
Medal	Total	Judoka	Coach	Total	Judoka	Coach
Gold	€26,000	€20,800	€5,200	€90,000	€72,000	€18,000
Silver	€15,000	€12,000	€3,000	€60,000	€48,000	€12,000
Bronze	€8,000	€6,400	€1,600	€25,000	€20,000	€5,000
