= Miriam Butkereit =

German judoka (born 1994)

Personal information
- Born: 8 May 1994 (age 32)
- Occupation: Judoka

Sport
- Country: Germany
- Sport: Judo
- Weight class: ‍–‍70 kg

Achievements and titles
- Olympic Games: (silver) (2024)
- World Champ.: (bronze) (2025)
- European Champ.: 5th (2020, 2024)
- Highest world ranking: 2^{nd}
Medal record
Women's judo
Representing Germany
Olympic Games
Silver medal – second place	2024 Paris	‍–‍70 kg
World Championships
Bronze medal – third place	2022 Tashkent	Mixed team
Bronze medal – third place	2025 Budapest	‍–‍70 kg
Bronze medal – third place	2025 Budapest	Mixed team
European Games
Silver medal – second place	2023 Kraków	Mixed team
IJF Grand Slam
Gold medal – first place	2024 Paris	‍–‍70 kg
Gold medal – first place	2024 Tashkent	‍–‍70 kg
Gold medal – first place	2026 Tashkent	‍–‍70 kg
Gold medal – first place	2026 Lausanne	‍–‍70 kg
Silver medal – second place	2018 Abu Dhabi	‍–‍70 kg
Silver medal – second place	2019 Düsseldorf	‍–‍70 kg
Silver medal – second place	2021 Tel Aviv	‍–‍70 kg
Silver medal – second place	2022 Budapest	‍–‍70 kg
Silver medal – second place	2023 Tel Aviv	‍–‍70 kg
Silver medal – second place	2026 Astana	‍–‍70 kg
Bronze medal – third place	2017 Abu Dhabi	‍–‍70 kg
Bronze medal – third place	2021 Baku	‍–‍70 kg
Bronze medal – third place	2022 Ulaanbaatar	‍–‍70 kg
Bronze medal – third place	2024 Tbilisi	‍–‍70 kg
IJF Grand Prix
Gold medal – first place	2019 Perth	‍–‍70 kg
Silver medal – second place	2022 Zagreb	‍–‍70 kg
Silver medal – second place	2023 Perth	‍–‍70 kg
Bronze medal – third place	2017 The Hague	‍–‍70 kg
Bronze medal – third place	2018 The Hague	‍–‍70 kg
Bronze medal – third place	2019 Antalya	‍–‍70 kg
Bronze medal – third place	2024 Odivelas	‍–‍70 kg
Bronze medal – third place	2026 Qingdao	‍–‍70 kg
European Cadet Championships
Bronze medal – third place	2010 Teplice	‍–‍63 kg

Profile at external databases
- IJF: 20102
- JudoInside.com: 47759
- Updated on 1 September 2026

Miriam Butkereit (born 8 May 1994) is a German judoka. She is an Olympic medalist, having won the silver medal at the 2024 Summer Olympics in the women's 70 kg event. Butkereit is also a two-time Grand Slam individual champion. As part of the Germany team she is a World Championships bronze medalist and a European Championships silver medalist in the mixed team category.

== Career ==
Butkereit took part in the 2020 European Championships in the women's 70 kg category, losing in the quarter-finals. In 2022 she reached the bronze medal match in the women's 70 kg category of the 2022 World Championships, but missed a medal after losing the bout to Saki Niizoe of Japan. In the mixed team event at the same competition Butkereit finished third with Germany.

In the women's 70 kg event of the 2023 World Championships in Doha, Butkereit entered in the second round but was unable to proceed far in the tournament, losing to Katie-Jemima Yeats-Brown in her second bout. During the Mixed Team Judo Championships at the 2023 European Games, Butkereit was part of the Germany team which finished second.

In February 2024 Butkereit took part in the 2024 Paris Grand Slam, winning her first Grand Slam gold. In March 2024 she won her second Grand Slam gold at the 2024 Tashkent Grand Slam, defeating Margaux Pinot of France in the final. In August 2024 Butkereit participated in the women's 70 kg category at the Paris Olympics, where she beat Austrian Michaela Polleres in the semi-finals. In the final she lost to Croatian judoka Barbara Matić, world number one, therefore winning the silver medal.
