= Saki Niizoe =

Japanese judoka (born 1996)

Personal information
- Native name: 新添左季
- Born: 4 July 1996 (age 30) Kashihara, Nara, Japan
- Occupation: Judoka

Sport
- Country: Japan
- Sport: Judo
- Weight class: ‍–‍70 kg
- Retired: 2024

Achievements and titles
- Olympic Games: 7th (2024)
- World Champ.: (gold) (2023)
- Asian Champ.: (gold) (2018, 2024)
Medal record
Women's judo
Representing Japan
Olympic Games
Silver medal – second place	2024 Paris	Mixed team
World Championships
Gold medal – first place	2017 Budapest	Mixed team
Gold medal – first place	2021 Budapest	Mixed team
Gold medal – first place	2022 Tashkent	Mixed team
Gold medal – first place	2023 Doha	‍–‍70 kg
Gold medal – first place	2023 Doha	Mixed team
Bronze medal – third place	2022 Tashkent	‍–‍70 kg
Asian Games
Gold medal – first place	2018 Jakarta	‍–‍70 kg
Gold medal – first place	2018 Jakarta	Mixed team
Asian Championships
Gold medal – first place	2024 Hong Kong	‍–‍70 kg
World Masters
Gold medal – first place	2018 Guangzhou	‍–‍70 kg
Bronze medal – third place	2022 Jerusalem	‍–‍70 kg
Bronze medal – third place	2023 Budapest	‍–‍70 kg
IJF Grand Slam
Gold medal – first place	2016 Tokyo	‍–‍70 kg
Gold medal – first place	2021 Paris	‍–‍70 kg
Gold medal – first place	2022 Budapest	‍–‍70 kg
Gold medal – first place	2022 Tokyo	‍–‍70 kg
Gold medal – first place	2023 Antalya	‍–‍70 kg
Silver medal – second place	2020 Paris	‍–‍70 kg
Silver medal – second place	2022 Paris	‍–‍70 kg
Bronze medal – third place	2017 Ekaterinburg	‍–‍70 kg
Bronze medal – third place	2018 Osaka	‍–‍70 kg
Bronze medal – third place	2019 Paris	‍–‍70 kg
Bronze medal – third place	2024 Tashkent	‍–‍70 kg
IJF Grand Prix
Gold medal – first place	2018 Budapest	‍–‍70 kg
Gold medal – first place	2019 Hohhot	‍–‍70 kg
Bronze medal – third place	2017 Düsseldorf	‍–‍70 kg
Bronze medal – third place	2018 Tunis	‍–‍70 kg
Asian Junior Championships
Gold medal – first place	2015 Bangkok	‍–‍70 kg
Summer Universiade
Gold medal – first place	2017 Taipei	Women's team
Silver medal – second place	2017 Taipei	‍–‍70 kg

Profile at external databases
- IJF: 28302
- JudoInside.com: 100690
- Updated on 5 August 2024

Saki Niizoe (born 4 July 1996) is a Japanese retired judoka. She won one of the bronze medals in the women's 70 kg event at the 2022 World Championships held in Tashkent, Uzbekistan. She won the gold medal in the women's 70 kg event at the 2018 Asian Games held in Jakarta, Indonesia.

In 2017, she won two medals at the Summer Universiade held in Taipei, Taiwan. In the same year, she won the gold medal in the mixed team event at the 2017 World Judo Championships held in Budapest, Hungary. She also won the gold medal in the mixed team event at the 2021 World Championships, also held in Budapest, Hungary.

She won the silver medal at the 2022 Paris Grand Slam in France. She won one of the bronze medals in the women's 70 kg event at the 2022 World Championships held in Tashkent, Uzbekistan. She won the gold medal in the women's 70 kg event at the 2023 World Championships held in Doha, Qatar. She also represented Japan at the 2024 Summer Olympics. After placing 7th at Olympics, she announced her retirement.
