= Fidan Ögel =

Turkish judoka (born 2002)

Personal information
- Born: 17 January 2002 (age 24) Manisa, Turkey
- Occupation: Judoka
- Height: 160 cm (5 ft 3 in)

Sport
- Country: Turkey
- Sport: Judo
- Weight class: ‍–‍70 kg
- Club: Galatasaray Judo

Achievements and titles
- Olympic Games: R32 (2024)
- World Champ.: R16 (2022)
- European Champ.: R32 (2022, 2024, 2025)
Medal record
Women's judo
Representing Turkey
IJF Grand Prix
Bronze medal – third place	2023 Perth	‍–‍70 kg
World Juniors Championships
Silver medal – second place	2022 Guayaquil	‍–‍70 kg

Profile at external databases
- IJF: 43128
- JudoInside.com: 120207
- Updated on 25 April 2025

Fidan Ögel (born 17 January 2002) is a Turkish female judoka competing in the middleweight (‍–‍70 kg) division. She is qualified for participation at the 2024 Olympics in Paris, France.

== Career ==
Ögel started her sports career at Manisa BB Sports Club. She then transferred to Galatasaray Judo in Istanbul. She is 160 cm (5 ft 3 in) tall, and has Dan 2 in black belt.

=== 2019 ===
Ögel became champion in the ‍–‍63 kg event at the 2019 Balkan Judo Championships for Cadets (U18) held in Budva, Montenegro.

=== 2022 ===
Ögel won the bronze medal at the Warsaw European Open 2022 in Poland.

She lost the first round match at the 2022 European Judo Championships in Sofia, Bulgaria.

She won the silver medal in the individual event and another silver medal in the team event at the 2022 World Judo Juniors Championships in Guayaquil, Ecuador.

At the Paks Junior European Cup 2022 in Hungary, she captured the silver medal.

She won the silver medal at the 2022 European Junior Mixed Team Judo Championships in Prague, Czech Republic.

She could not advance from the Round of 16 at the 2022 World Judo Championships in Tashkent, Uzbekistan.

=== 2023 ===
She lost the first round match at the 2023 World Judo Championships in Doha, Qatar.

She was part of the ‍–‍70 kg team at the 2023 European Mixed Team Judo Championships in Krynica-Zdrój, Poland.

At the 2023 Judo Oceania Open Perth in Perth, Australia, she took the bronze medal.

=== 2024 ===
She lost the first round match at the 2024 European Judo Championships in Zagreb, Croatia

At the 2024 World Judo Championships – Women's 70 kg in Abu Dhabi, United Arab Emirates, she lost the Round of 32 match.

In 2024, she competed at the Grand Prix Odivelas in Portugal, Grand Slam Paris in France, European Judo Championships Seniors Individuals in Zagreb, Croatia, Grand Slam Dushanbe in Tajikistan, Grand Slam Astana in Kazakhstan and Grand Slam Abu Dhabi in the United Arab Emirates. From those tournaments, she returned without achieving a medal.

According to her international rank, she qualified to represent her country at the 2024 Olympics in Paris, France.

== Personal life ==
Fidan Ögel was born in Manisa, Turkey on 17 January 2002.
