= Taís Pina =

Portuguese judoka (born 2004)

Personal information
- Born: 13 October 2004 (age 22)
- Occupation: Judoka

Sport
- Country: Portugal
- Sport: Judo
- Weight class: ‍–‍70 kg

Achievements and titles
- Olympic Games: R32 (2024)
- World Champ.: R16 (2025)
- European Champ.: 5th (2025)
Medal record
Women's judo
Representing Portugal
IJF Grand Slam
| Gold medal – first place | 2024 Astana | ‍–‍70 kg |
| Gold medal – first place | 2026 Abu Dhabi | ‍–‍70 kg |
| Silver medal – second place | 2024 Antalya | ‍–‍70 kg |
IJF Grand Prix
| Bronze medal – third place | 2026 Linz | ‍–‍70 kg |
European U23 Championships
| Bronze medal – third place | 2023 Potsdam | ‍–‍70 kg |
| Bronze medal – third place | 2025 Chișinău | ‍–‍70 kg |
World University Games
| Bronze medal – third place | 2025 Essen | ‍–‍70 kg |

Profile at external databases
- IJF: 50717
- JudoInside.com: 134406
- Updated on 31 October 2026

Taís Bianca Vasconcelos de Pina (born 13 October 2004) is a Portuguese judoka. She competed at the 2024 Paris Olympics.

== Career ==
Pina won a bronze medal at the European Cup Cadets in Fuengirola in 2020. She won Junior European Cup events in Málaga and Berlin in 2023. That year, she became senior Portuguese Champion. She was also a bronze medalist at the 2023 European U23 Championships in Potsdam.

Pina made her first Grand Slam podium when she won a silver medal at 2024 Antalya Grand Slam, in March 2024. She made her debut appearance at a senior European Championships in Zagreb 2024 in April. She won the 2024 Astana Grand Slam in May. She was selected for the 2024 Summer Olympics in the Women's 70 kg, where she lost in the first round to Kim Polling.
