= Gabriella Willems =

Belgian judoka (born 1997)

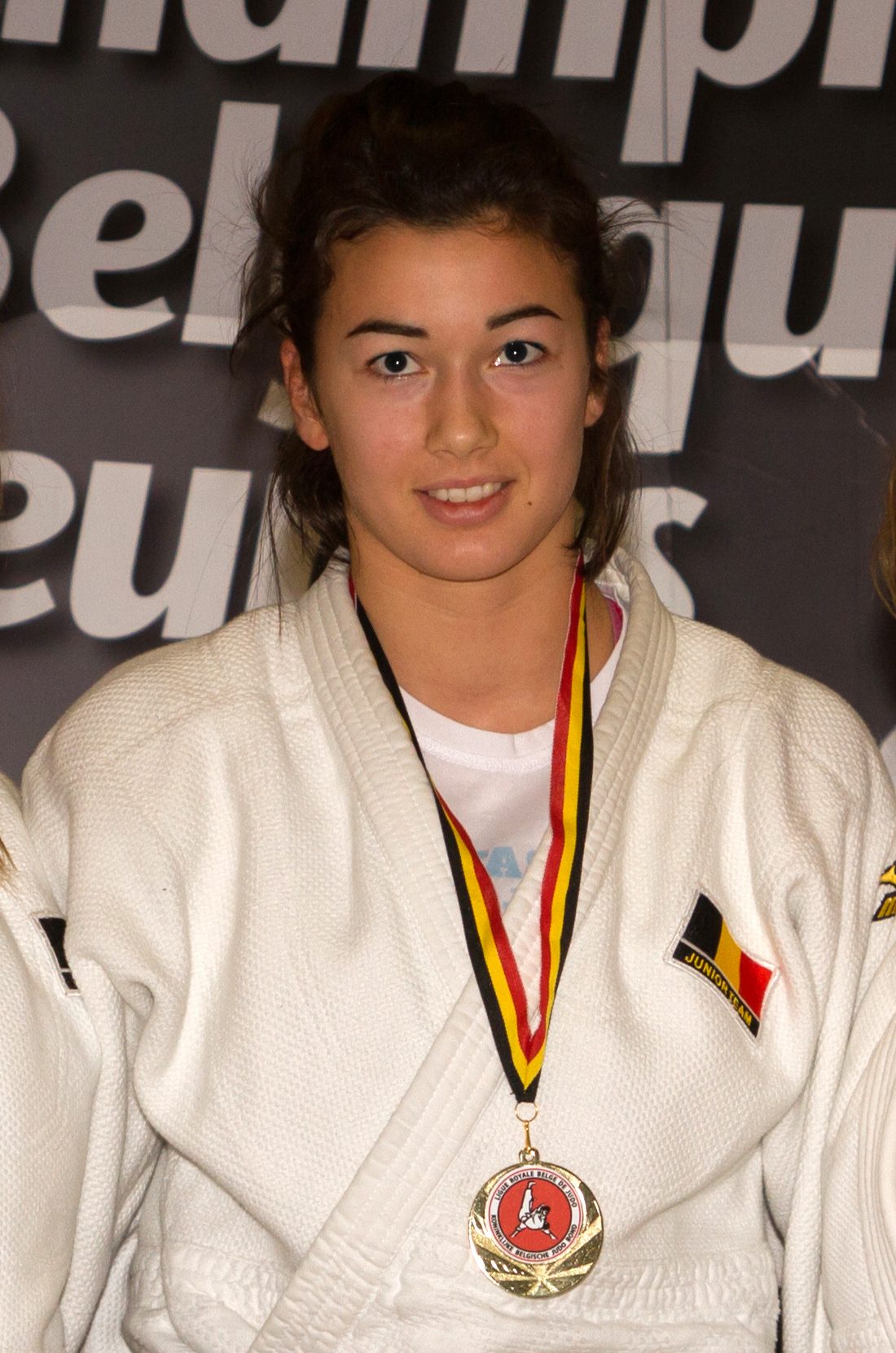
- Willems at the 2016 Belgian Judo Championship

Personal information
- Born: 1 July 1997 (age 29)
- Occupation: Judoka

Sport
- Country: Belgium
- Sport: Judo
- Weight class: ‍–‍70 kg
- Club: Sport Lisboa e Benfica
- Coached by: Damien Bomboir

Achievements and titles
- Olympic Games: (bronze) (2024)
- World Champ.: 5th (2024)
- European Champ.: R16 (2018, 2022, 2024, 2025)
Medal record
Women's judo
Representing Belgium
Olympic Games
Bronze medal – third place	2024 Paris	‍–‍70 kg
IJF Grand Slam
Silver medal – second place	2020 Düsseldorf	‍–‍70 kg
Silver medal – second place	2022 Abu Dhabi	‍–‍70 kg
Silver medal – second place	2022 Baku	‍–‍70 kg
Bronze medal – third place	2021 Tbilisi	‍–‍70 kg
Bronze medal – third place	2023 Tel Aviv	‍–‍70 kg
IJF Grand Prix
Silver medal – second place	2018 Cancún	‍–‍70 kg
Bronze medal – third place	2018 The Hague	‍–‍70 kg
Bronze medal – third place	2025 Guadalajara	‍–‍70 kg
World Juniors Championships
Bronze medal – third place	2017 Zagreb	‍–‍70 kg

Profile at external databases
- IJF: 21512
- JudoInside.com: 27709
- Updated on 19 October 2025

Gabriella (Gaby) Willems (born 1 July 1997) is a Belgian judoka, winner of the bronze medal at the 2024 Summer Olympics.

== Personal life ==
Willems grew up in Barchon, Liège Province, Belgium. Her first name is testament to her Italian heritage, her maternal grandmother's father having emigrated from the Venice region, Italy to work in the Belgian coalmines. She attended primary school in Verviers where she tried her hand at gymnastics, swimming, karate and dance before turning to judo and joining amateur club J.C. Andrimont in Dison at the age of 6. Although she later decided to train professionally at other clubs, she always stayed a member of J.C. Andrimont and presented herself as such at the 2024 Summer Olympics in Paris.

Willems attended Athénée royal Thil Lorrain in Verviers where she obtained in 2015 her CESS (Certificat d'enseignement secondaire supérieur).

Willems is in a relationship with Italian judoka, Christian Parlati. The couple lives in Naples where both train at the Parlati-family founded and managed Nippon Club.

== Career ==
Having won several youth national titles, Willems won her first senior national title in 2016.

Willems first rose to international prominence winning a bronze medal at the 2017 World Judo Juniors Championships in Zagreb, Croatia. Two weeks later she was crowned a second time senior national champion.

Willems was the silver medalist of the 2020 Judo Grand Slam Düsseldorf in the ‍–‍70 kg category.

She started 2021 well, with a 5th placing at the 2021 Judo Grand Slam Tel Aviv in mid-February and a bronze medal at the 2021 Judo Grand Slam Tbilisi in March. Being close to qualifying for the 2020 Summer Olympics in Tokyo, Japan, in a fight against Barbara Matic, Willems tore the cruciate ligaments of her right knee at the 2021 Judo Grand Slam in Antalya, Turkey, putting an end to her Olympic dreams for Tokyo.

Following a lengthy recovery period, Willems re-entered competition a year later at the 2022 European Judo Championships. In October and November of that year, she won silver medals at the 2022 Judo Grand Slam Abu Dhabi and 2022 Judo Grand Slam Baku.

Willems's good form continued in to 2023 and she won a bronze medal at the 2023 Judo Grand Slam Tel Aviv. But then, more injuries: first, Willems had to undergo Latarjet surgery to treat recurrent shoulder dislocations and then, upon her return to competition in the 2023 Judo World Masters in September, in warm-up, she suffered another cruciate ligament tear in the same right knee she injured before.

After another lengthy recovery period, Willems returned to competition at the 2024 European Judo Championships where she was eliminated in the 2nd round. Willems had little time to gather the necessary points to qualify for the Games. Needing to finish at least 5th at the 2024 World Judo Championships in order to qualify for the 2024 Summer Olympics, she managed to do just that and booked her ticket for Paris.

At the 2024 Summer Olympics Willems upset competitors ranked 2, 5, and 7 on her way to winning the bronze medal in the Women's 70 kg category.
