= Shiho Tanaka (judoka) =

Japanese judoka (born 1998)

Personal information
- Born: 29 June 1998 (age 28)
- Occupation: Judoka

Sport
- Country: Japan
- Sport: Judo
- Weight class: ‍–‍70 kg

Achievements and titles
- World Champ.: (gold) (2025)
- Asian Champ.: (gold) (2019, 2023)
- Highest world ranking: 2^{nd}
Medal record
Women's judo
Representing Japan
World Championships
Gold medal – first place	2024 Abu Dhabi	Mixed team
Gold medal – first place	2025 Budapest	‍–‍70 kg
Gold medal – first place	2026 Baku	Mixed team
Bronze medal – third place	2024 Abu Dhabi	‍–‍70 kg
Bronze medal – third place	2025 Budapest	Mixed team
Asian Games
Gold medal – first place	2018 Jakarta	Mixed team
Gold medal – first place	2023 Hangzhou	‍–‍70 kg
Gold medal – first place	2023 Hangzhou	Mixed team
Asian Championships
Gold medal – first place	2019 Fujairah	‍–‍70 kg
IJF Grand Slam
Gold medal – first place	2022 Tel Aviv	‍–‍70 kg
Gold medal – first place	2023 Ulaanbaatar	‍–‍70 kg
Gold medal – first place	2025 Tokyo	‍–‍70 kg
Gold medal – first place	2026 Ulaanbaatar	‍–‍70 kg
Silver medal – second place	2021 Abu Dhabi	‍–‍70 kg
Silver medal – second place	2023 Tokyo	‍–‍70 kg
Bronze medal – third place	2017 Tokyo	‍–‍70 kg
Bronze medal – third place	2019 Ekaterinburg	‍–‍70 kg
Bronze medal – third place	2025 Baku	‍–‍70 kg
Bronze medal – third place	2026 Tbilisi	‍–‍70 kg
IJF Grand Prix
Gold medal – first place	2025 Zagreb	‍–‍70 kg
Bronze medal – third place	2024 Zagreb	‍–‍70 kg
Summer Universiade
Gold medal – first place	2019 Naples	‍–‍70 kg
Gold medal – first place	2019 Naples	Women's team

Profile at external databases
- IJF: 38009
- JudoInside.com: 108933
- Updated on 21 June 2026

Shiho Tanaka (田中 志歩, Tanaka Shiho; born 29 June 1998) is a Japanese judoka and Wrestler. Her older brother, Genta Tanaka, placed second in the over 100 kg division at the 2015 World Judo Juniors Championships.

== Career ==
She started Judo at the age of 5, influenced by her father, who had Judo and Sumo experiences. She also wrestled from ages 10 to 17. In 2015, she placed third in the 65 kg division at the World Cadet Wrestling Championship. After entering International Pacific University in 2017, she was coached by Toshihiko Koga, a gold medalist at the Barcelona Olympics. In 2018, she won the gold medal in the mixed team event at the Asian Games held in Jakarta, Indonesia. In 2019, she won the gold medal in the women's –70 kg event at the Asian-Pacific Judo Championships held in Fujairah, United Arab Emirates. Then, she won the gold medal in the women's middleweight (–70 kg) event at the 2019 Summer Universiade held in Naples, Italy. She also won the gold medal in the women's team event.

After graduating from university in 2021, she became a member of The East Japan Railway Company's Judo club. At the 2021 Judo Grand Slam Abu Dhabi held in Abu Dhabi, United Arab Emirates, she won the silver medal in her event. In December 2021, She won the All-Japan Judo Championships while being a 70 kg athlete. She won the gold medal in her event at the 2022 Judo Grand Slam Tel Aviv held in Tel Aviv, Israel.
