= Gulnoza Matniyazova =

Uzbekistani judoka (born 1994)

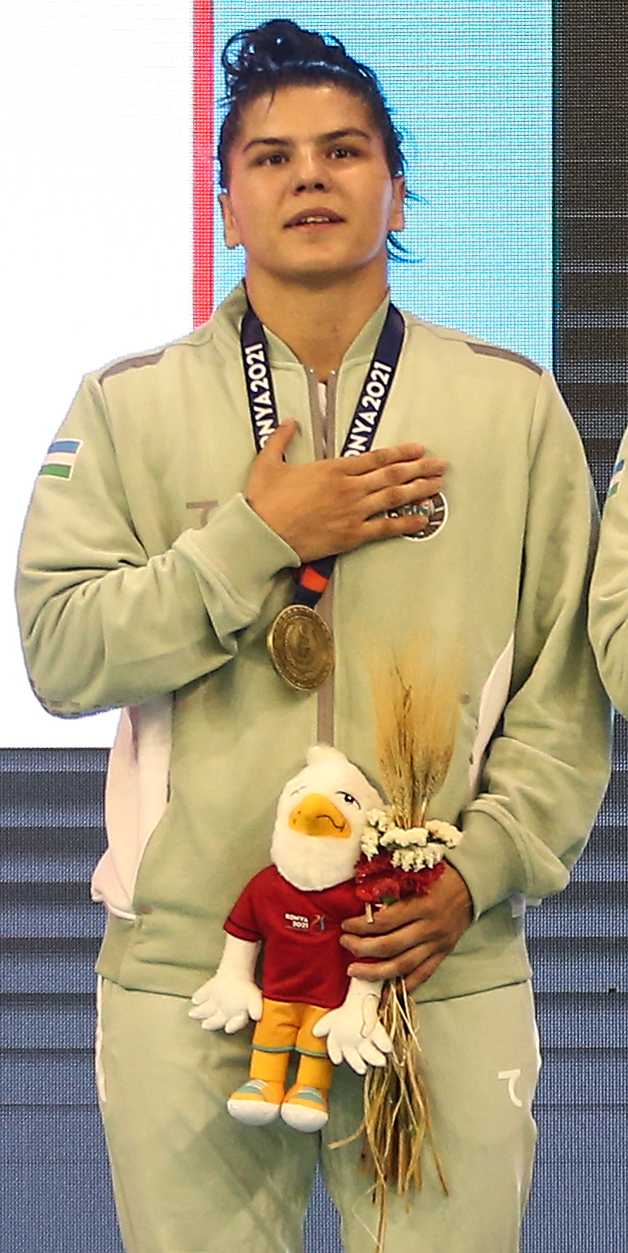

Personal information
- Full name: Gulnoza Jumaboy qizi Matniyazova
- Born: 10 August 1994 (age 31) Pichokchi, Uzbekistan
- Occupation: Judoka

Sport
- Country: Uzbekistan
- Sport: Judo
- Weight class: ‍–‍70 kg

Achievements and titles
- Olympic Games: R16 (2020, 2024)
- World Champ.: 7th (2014, 2022)
- Asian Champ.: (gold) (2021)
Medal record
Women's judo
Representing Uzbekistan
World Championships
Bronze medal – third place	2021 Budapest	Mixed team
Asian Games
Silver medal – second place	2023 Hangzhou	Mixed team
Bronze medal – third place	2018 Jakarta	‍–‍70 kg
Bronze medal – third place	2023 Hangzhou	‍–‍70 kg
Asian Championships
Gold medal – first place	2021 Bishkek	‍–‍70 kg
Silver medal – second place	2015 Kuwait City	‍–‍70 kg
Silver medal – second place	2019 Fujairah	‍–‍70 kg
Silver medal – second place	2022 Nur‑Sultan	‍–‍70 kg
Bronze medal – third place	2013 Bangkok	‍–‍70 kg
Bronze medal – third place	2016 Tashkent	‍–‍70 kg
IJF Grand Slam
Bronze medal – third place	2021 Tashkent	‍–‍70 kg
Bronze medal – third place	2021 Tbilisi	‍–‍70 kg
Bronze medal – third place	2022 Ulaanbaatar	‍–‍70 kg
Bronze medal – third place	2023 Tashkent	‍–‍70 kg
IJF Grand Prix
Gold medal – first place	2016 Tashkent	‍–‍70 kg
Gold medal – first place	2017 Tashkent	‍–‍70 kg
Silver medal – second place	2019 Tashkent	‍–‍70 kg
Silver medal – second place	2024 Odivelas	‍–‍70 kg
Bronze medal – third place	2012 Baku	‍–‍70 kg
Bronze medal – third place	2013 Tashkent	‍–‍70 kg
Bronze medal – third place	2016 Budapest	‍–‍70 kg
Islamic Solidarity Games
Gold medal – first place	2017 Baku	‍–‍70 kg
Gold medal – first place	2021 Konya	‍–‍70 kg
Bronze medal – third place	2017 Baku	Women's team
Asian Junior Championships
Gold medal – first place	2011 Beirut	‍–‍70 kg
Silver medal – second place	2010 Bangkok	‍–‍63 kg
World Cadets Championships
Silver medal – second place	2009 Budapest	‍–‍63 kg
Asian Cadet Championships
Gold medal – first place	2008 Sanaa	‍–‍52 kg
Military World Games
Bronze medal – third place	2019 Wuhan	‍–‍70 kg

Profile at external databases
- IJF: 3904
- JudoInside.com: 58459
- Updated on 31 July 2024

Gulnoza Jumaboy qizi Matniyazova (born 10 August 1994) is an Uzbekistani judoka. She competed at the 2016 Summer Olympics in the women's 70 kg event, in which she was eliminated in the first round by Katarzyna Kłys. She also competed in the women's 70 kg event at the 2020 Summer Olympics in Tokyo, Japan.

At the 2019 Asian-Pacific Judo Championships held in Fujairah, United Arab Emirates, she won the silver medal in the women's 70 kg event. In the women's 70 kg event at the 2019 Military World Games held in Wuhan, China, she won one of the bronze medals.

In 2021, she competed in the women's 70 kg event at the Judo World Masters held in Doha, Qatar, where she did not advance beyond her pool.
