= Hilde Jager =

Dutch judoka (born 1997)

Personal information
- Nationality: Dutch
- Born: 20 December 1997 (age 28) Apeldoorn, Netherlands
- Occupation: Judoka

Sport
- Country: Netherlands
- Sport: Judo
- Weight class: ‍–‍70 kg

Achievements and titles
- World Champ.: R16 (2021)
- European Champ.: 5th (2022)
Medal record
Women's judo
Representing the Netherlands
European Games
Bronze medal – third place	2023 Kraków	Mixed team
IJF Grand Slam
Silver medal – second place	2024 Abu Dhabi	‍–‍70 kg
Bronze medal – third place	2021 Paris	‍–‍70 kg
Bronze medal – third place	2023 Abu Dhabi	‍–‍70 kg
IJF Grand Prix
Bronze medal – third place	2019 Tashkent	‍–‍70 kg
Bronze medal – third place	2023 Linz	‍–‍70 kg
European U23 Championships
Gold medal – first place	2017 Podgorica	‍–‍70 kg
Silver medal – second place	2019 Izhevsk	‍–‍70 kg
European Cadet Championships
Bronze medal – third place	2014 Athens	‍–‍57 kg

Profile at external databases
- IJF: 13481
- JudoInside.com: 63542
- Updated on 13 October 2024

Hilde Jager (born 20 December 1997) is a Dutch judoka. She competed at the 2021 World Judo Championships.
