= Maya Goshen =

Israeli judoka (born 2000)

Personal information
- Native name: מאיה גושן
- Born: 25 June 2000 (age 26)
- Occupation: Judoka

Sport
- Country: Israel
- Sport: Judo
- Weight class: ‍–‍70 kg
- Rank: 3rd dan black belt

Achievements and titles
- Olympic Games: R16 (2024)
- World Champ.: R16 (2022)
- European Champ.: 7th (2023)
- Highest world ranking: 16^{th}
Medal record
Women's judo
Representing Israel
World Championships
Bronze medal – third place	2022 Tashkent	Mixed team
IJF Grand Slam
Bronze medal – third place	2023 Antalya	‍–‍70 kg
Bronze medal – third place	2023 Ulaanbaatar	‍–‍70 kg
IJF Grand Prix
Bronze medal – third place	2026 Zagreb	‍–‍70 kg
European U23 Championships
Silver medal – second place	2020 Poreč	‍–‍70 kg

Profile at external databases
- IJF: 26366
- JudoInside.com: 99027
- Updated on 15 November 2026

Maya Goshen (Hebrew: מאיה גושן; born 25 June 2000) is an Israeli judoka who competes for the Israel national judo team. She won a silver medal at the 2020 European U23 championship and a bronze at the mixed team event of the 2022 World Championships. Goshen represented Israel at the 2024 Paris Olympics in judo in the women's 70 kg, and in the mixed team event, at which Team Israel came in ninth.

== Early and personal life ==
Goshen, who is Jewish, lives in the town of Even Yehuda, Israel, with her parents, Tzachi and Hilit, and her two younger sisters. As six years of age, Goshen practiced floor gymnastics before transitioning to judo.

== Judo career ==
=== 2015–20; European U23 championship silver medal ===
At the 2015 Asian Cup U18 Macau, Goshen won a gold medal, and at the 2015 Asian Cup U18 Taipei in Taiwan she won a bronze medal.

Goshen won gold medals at the 2017 European Cup Cadets Fuengirola and at the 2017 European Cup Cadets in Coimbra, Portugal.

At the 2018 Junior European Cup in Paks, Hungary, Goshen won a silver medal. She won a silver medal at the 2018 Israeli Championships in Tel Aviv, as well as at the Israeli U21 Championships in Haifa.

Goshen won a bronze medal at the 2019 European Cup Dubrovnik in Croatia. She won gold medals at the 2019 European Cup U21 Athens and the 2019 European Cup U21 Sarajevo, and a bronze medal at the 2019 European Cup U21 Coimbra. She won silver medals at the 2019 New York Open Team Championships, and at the 2019 Israeli Championships in Tel Aviv, as well as at the 2019 Israeli U21 Championships in Ra'anana.

She won a silver medal at the 2020 European U23 Championships in Poreč, Croatia. She won the gold medal at the 2020 Israeli U21 Championships in Ra'anana.

=== 2021–present; World junior championship mixed team bronze medal ===
At the mixed team event of the 2022 World Championships in Tashkent, Uzbekistan, Goshen won the final match for the Israel national judo team, winning them the bronze medal. Her win and subsequent reaction to the injury sustained by her Dutch opponent Sanne Vermeer, was applauded in media.

Goshen won bronze medals at the 2023 Antalya Grand Slam and the 2023 Ulaanbaatar Grand Slam. She won the 2023 Israeli Championships.

=== 2024 Paris Olympics ===
Goshen represented Israel at the 2024 Paris Olympics in judo in the women's 70 kg, in which she defeated Fidan Ögel of Turkey, and lost to former world champion Marie-Ève Gahié of France, coming in ninth. She also competed in the mixed team event, at which Team Israel came in ninth.

== See also ==
- List of select Jewish judokas
- Israel Judo Association
- Israel national judo team
