= Barbara Matić =

Croatian judoka (born 1994)

Personal information
- Born: 3 December 1994 (age 31) Split, Croatia
- Occupation: Judoka
- Height: 1.71 m (5 ft 7 in)

Sport
- Country: Croatia
- Sport: Judo
- Weight class: ‍–‍70 kg

Achievements and titles
- Olympic Games: (gold) (2024)
- World Champ.: (2021, 2022)
- European Champ.: (gold) (2024)
- Highest world ranking: 1^{st}
Medal record
Women's judo
Representing Croatia
Olympic Games
Gold medal – first place	2024 Paris	‍–‍70 kg
World Championships
Gold medal – first place	2021 Budapest	‍–‍70 kg
Gold medal – first place	2022 Tashkent	‍–‍70 kg
Bronze medal – third place	2023 Doha	‍–‍70 kg
European Games
Bronze medal – third place	2019 Minsk	‍–‍70 kg
European Championships
Gold medal – first place	2024 Zagreb	‍–‍70 kg
Bronze medal – third place	2014 Montpellier	‍–‍70 kg
Bronze medal – third place	2017 Warsaw	‍–‍70 kg
Bronze medal – third place	2023 Montpellier	‍–‍70 kg
World Masters
Silver medal – second place	2017 Saint Petersburg	‍–‍70 kg
IJF Grand Slam
Gold medal – first place	2020 Budapest	‍–‍70 kg
Gold medal – first place	2024 Baku	‍–‍70 kg
Gold medal – first place	2024 Tbilisi	‍–‍70 kg
Silver medal – second place	2018 Düsseldorf	‍–‍70 kg
Silver medal – second place	2021 Tashkent	‍–‍70 kg
Silver medal – second place	2021 Antalya	‍–‍70 kg
Silver medal – second place	2021 Paris	‍–‍70 kg
Silver medal – second place	2023 Tashkent	‍–‍70 kg
Silver medal – second place	2023 Antalya	‍–‍70 kg
Bronze medal – third place	2017 Baku	‍–‍70 kg
Bronze medal – third place	2018 Ekaterinburg	‍–‍70 kg
Bronze medal – third place	2022 Paris	‍–‍70 kg
Bronze medal – third place	2022 Budapest	‍–‍70 kg
Bronze medal – third place	2023 Baku	‍–‍70 kg
Bronze medal – third place	2024 Paris	‍–‍70 kg
IJF Grand Prix
Gold medal – first place	2014 Tbilisi	‍–‍70 kg
Gold medal – first place	2015 Qingdao	‍–‍70 kg
Gold medal – first place	2016 Zagreb	‍–‍70 kg
Gold medal – first place	2022 Zagreb	‍–‍70 kg
Gold medal – first place	2024 Odivelas	‍–‍70 kg
Silver medal – second place	2014 Budapest	‍–‍70 kg
Silver medal – second place	2023 Zagreb	‍–‍70 kg
Bronze medal – third place	2014 Havana	‍–‍70 kg
Bronze medal – third place	2014 Zagreb	‍–‍70 kg
Bronze medal – third place	2015 Jeju	‍–‍70 kg
Bronze medal – third place	2016 Ulaanbaatar	‍–‍70 kg
Bronze medal – third place	2017 Antalya	‍–‍70 kg
Bronze medal – third place	2017 Hohhot	‍–‍70 kg
European U23 Championships
Silver medal – second place	2012 Prague	‍–‍70 kg
World Juniors Championships
Gold medal – first place	2013 Ljubljana	‍–‍70 kg
Gold medal – first place	2014 Fort Lauderdale	‍–‍70 kg
European Junior Championships
Gold medal – first place	2013 Sarajevo	‍–‍70 kg
Silver medal – second place	2012 Poreč	‍–‍70 kg
Silver medal – second place	2014 Bucharest	‍–‍70 kg
Bronze medal – third place	2011 Lommel	‍–‍70 kg
World Cadets Championships
Bronze medal – third place	2009 Budapest	‍–‍63 kg
European Cadet Championships
Gold medal – first place	2010 Teplice	‍–‍63 kg
Youth Olympic Games
Bronze medal – third place	2010 Singapore	‍–‍63 kg

Profile at external databases
- IJF: 2775
- JudoInside.com: 50461
- Updated on 31 July 2024

Barbara Matić (born 3 December 1994) is a Croatian judoka. She won the gold medal at the 2024 Summer Olympics in the women's 70 kg event, and is a two-time world champion (2021, 2022) and a European champion (2024) in the women's 70 kg division. Matić is also a two-time junior world champion (2013, 2014) and a junior European champion (2013). She competed at the 2016 Summer Olympics and the 2020 Summer Olympics.

== Career ==
Matić won her first international title at the 2010 European Cadet Championships in the women's 63 kg event and later competed at the 2010 Youth Olympics, winning a bronze medal in the girls' 63 kg event. She placed second at the 2012 European U23 Championships in the women's 70 kg division. Matić won the 2013 World Juniors Championships in Ljubljana and the 2013 European Junior Championships in Sarajevo, both in the women's 70 kg division. She retained her world championship title at the 2014 World Juniors Championships in Fort Lauerdale, while placing second at the 2014 European Junior Championships in Bucharest and winning her first European Championships medal by finishing third at the 2014 European Championships in Montpellier.

Matić made her Olympic Games debut at the 2016 Summer Olympics in Rio de Janeiro. She won bronze medals at the 2017 European Championships in Warsaw and the 2019 European Games in Minsk. Matić competed at the 2020 Summer Olympics in Tokyo, placing fifth in the women's 70 kg event. She won her first World Championship title at the 2021 Championships in Budapest, becoming the first Croatian to win a senior title in judo. Matić successfully defended her title at the 2022 World Championships in Tashkent. In 2023, she won bronze medals at the World Championships in Doha and the European Championships in Montpellier.

Matić won the European Championship title at the 2024 Championships in Zagreb. She won the gold medal at the 2024 Summer Olympics in the women's 70 kg event, becoming the first Croatian to win an Olympic gold medal in judo, in addition to being one of Croatia's flag bearers during the opening ceremony.

== Personal life ==
Matić is the older sister of fellow judoka, Youth Olympic champion and world junior champion Brigita Matić.
