= Marie-Ève Gahié =

French judoka (born 1996)

Marie-Eve Gahié
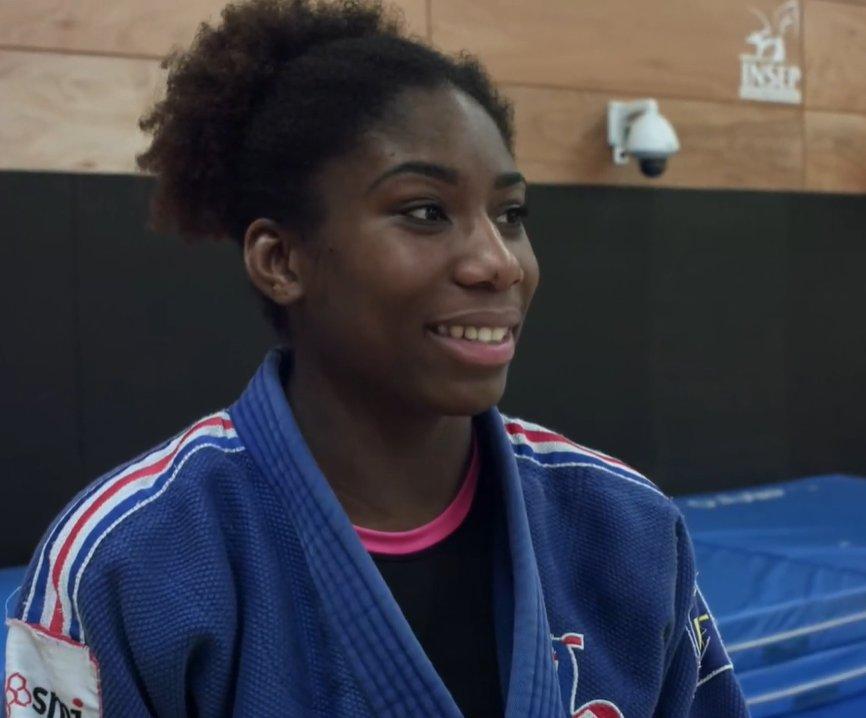
- Gahié in 2017

Personal information
- Born: 27 November 1996 (age 29) Paris, France
- Occupation: Judoka
- Height: 1.75 m (5 ft 9 in)

Sport
- Country: France
- Sport: Judo
- Weight class: ‍–‍70 kg

Achievements and titles
- Olympic Games: 7th (2024)
- World Champ.: (2019)
- European Champ.: (gold) (2022, 2023)
Medal record
Women's judo
Representing France
Olympic Games
Gold medal – first place	2024 Paris	Mixed team
World Championships
Gold medal – first place	2019 Tokyo	‍–‍70 kg
Silver medal – second place	2018 Baku	‍–‍70 kg
Silver medal – second place	2018 Baku	Mixed team
Silver medal – second place	2019 Tokyo	Mixed team
Silver medal – second place	2021 Budapest	Mixed team
Silver medal – second place	2022 Tashkent	Mixed team
Silver medal – second place	2023 Doha	Mixed team
Silver medal – second place	2024 Abu Dhabi	‍–‍70 kg
Bronze medal – third place	2017 Budapest	Mixed team
European Games
Gold medal – first place	2015 Baku	Women's team
Bronze medal – third place	2019 Minsk	Mixed team
European Championships
Gold medal – first place	2017 Warsaw	Women's team
Gold medal – first place	2022 Sofia	‍–‍70 kg
Gold medal – first place	2022 Mulhouse	Mixed team
Gold medal – first place	2023 Montpellier	‍–‍70 kg
Bronze medal – third place	2017 Warsaw	‍–‍70 kg
Bronze medal – third place	2020 Prague	‍–‍70 kg
World Masters
Silver medal – second place	2022 Jerusalem	‍–‍70 kg
Bronze medal – third place	2017 Saint Petersburg	‍–‍70 kg
Bronze medal – third place	2019 Qingdao	‍–‍70 kg
IJF Grand Slam
Gold medal – first place	2016 Abu Dhabi	‍–‍70 kg
Gold medal – first place	2019 Ekaterinburg	‍–‍70 kg
Gold medal – first place	2022 Antalya	‍–‍70 kg
Silver medal – second place	2023 Paris	‍–‍70 kg
Silver medal – second place	2024 Paris	‍–‍70 kg
Silver medal – second place	2024 Baku	‍–‍70 kg
Bronze medal – third place	2015 Baku	‍–‍70 kg
Bronze medal – third place	2018 Paris	‍–‍70 kg
Bronze medal – third place	2021 Tel Aviv	‍–‍70 kg
Bronze medal – third place	2021 Abu Dhabi	‍–‍70 kg
Bronze medal – third place	2022 Tel Aviv	‍–‍70 kg
Bronze medal – third place	2023 Baku	‍–‍70 kg
Bronze medal – third place	2025 Paris	‍–‍70 kg
IJF Grand Prix
Gold medal – first place	2016 Samsun	‍–‍70 kg
Gold medal – first place	2016 Almaty	‍–‍70 kg
Gold medal – first place	2018 Tbilisi	‍–‍70 kg
Gold medal – first place	2018 Zagreb	‍–‍70 kg
Silver medal – second place	2017 Düsseldorf	‍–‍70 kg
Bronze medal – third place	2015 Tbilisi	‍–‍70 kg
Bronze medal – third place	2016 Havana	‍–‍70 kg
World Juniors Championships
Bronze medal – third place	2014 Fort Lauderdale	‍–‍70 kg
European Junior Championships
Gold medal – first place	2016 Málaga	‍–‍70 kg
World Cadets Championships
Gold medal – first place	2013 Miami	‍–‍70 kg
European Cadet Championships
Gold medal – first place	2013 Tallinn	‍–‍70 kg
Bronze medal – third place	2012 Bar	‍–‍70 kg

Profile at external databases
- IJF: 13300
- JudoInside.com: 72529
- Updated on 3 February 2025

Marie-Eve Gahié (born 27 November 1996) is a French judoka. She is the 2017 European bronze medalist and the 2019 World champion in the 70 kg division.

On 12 November 2022 she won a gold medal at the 2022 European Mixed Team Judo Championships as part of team France.

== Personal life ==
Born in France, Gahié is of Ivorian descent.
