= Lara Cvjetko =

Croatian judoka (born 2001)

Personal information
- Born: 1 September 2001 (age 25)
- Occupation: Judoka
- Height: 173 cm (5 ft 8 in)

Sport
- Country: Croatia
- Sport: Judo
- Weight class: ‍–‍70 kg

Achievements and titles
- World Champ.: (silver) (2022, 2025)
- European Champ.: (bronze) (2024, 2025)
- Highest world ranking: 1^{st}
Medal record
Women's judo
Representing Croatia
World Championships
Silver medal – second place	2022 Tashkent	‍–‍70 kg
Silver medal – second place	2025 Budapest	‍–‍70 kg
European Championships
Bronze medal – third place	2024 Zagreb	‍–‍70 kg
Bronze medal – third place	2025 Podgorica	‍–‍70 kg
World Masters
Bronze medal – third place	2022 Jerusalem	‍–‍70 kg
Bronze medal – third place	2023 Budapest	‍–‍70 kg
IJF Grand Slam
Gold medal – first place	2025 Dushanbe	‍–‍70 kg
Silver medal – second place	2021 Baku	‍–‍70 kg
Silver medal – second place	2023 Ulaanbaatar	‍–‍70 kg
Silver medal – second place	2024 Dushanbe	‍–‍70 kg
Silver medal – second place	2024 Astana	‍–‍70 kg
Bronze medal – third place	2024 Abu Dhabi	‍–‍70 kg
Bronze medal – third place	2024 Tokyo	‍–‍70 kg
Bronze medal – third place	2025 Baku	‍–‍70 kg
Bronze medal – third place	2026 Ulaanbaatar	‍–‍70 kg
IJF Grand Prix
Gold medal – first place	2022 Almada	‍–‍70 kg
Gold medal – first place	2023 Zagreb	‍–‍70 kg
Gold medal – first place	2025 Qingdao	‍–‍70 kg
Gold medal – first place	2025 Guadalajara	‍–‍70 kg
Gold medal – first place	2026 Qingdao	‍–‍70 kg
Bronze medal – third place	2022 Zagreb	‍–‍70 kg
Bronze medal – third place	2024 Zagreb	‍–‍70 kg
European U23 Championships
Gold medal – first place	2020 Poreč	‍–‍70 kg
World Juniors Championships
Silver medal – second place	2021 Olbia	‍–‍70 kg
European Junior Championships
Silver medal – second place	2021 Luxembourg	‍–‍70 kg
European Cadet Championships
Gold medal – first place	2017 Kaunas	‍–‍57 kg
Silver medal – second place	2018 Sarajevo	‍–‍57 kg
Mediterranean Games
Bronze medal – third place	2026 Taranto	‍–‍70 kg

Profile at external databases
- IJF: 29418
- JudoInside.com: 97190
- Updated on 1 September 2026

Lara Cvjetko (born 1 September 2001) is a Croatian judoka. She won the silver medal in the women's 70 kg event at the 2022 World Judo Championships held in Tashkent, Uzbekistan.

Cvjetko lost her bronze medal match in the women's 70 kg event at the 2022 Mediterranean Games held in Oran, Algeria.
