= Anka Pogačnik =

Slovenian judoka (born 1991)

Personal information
- Nationality: Slovenian
- Born: 23 December 1991 (age 34)
- Occupation: Judoka

Sport
- Country: Slovenia
- Sport: Judo
- Weight class: ‍–‍70 kg

Achievements and titles
- Olympic Games: R16 (2024)
- World Champ.: R16 (2017, 2022)
- European Champ.: (bronze) (2022)
Medal record
Women's judo
Representing Slovenia
European Games
Bronze medal – third place	2015 Baku	Women's team
European Championships
Bronze medal – third place	2022 Sofia	‍–‍70 kg
IJF Grand Prix
Gold medal – first place	2017 Antalya	‍–‍70 kg
Gold medal – first place	2021 Zagreb	‍–‍70 kg
Gold medal – first place	2022 Perth	‍–‍70 kg
Silver medal – second place	2016 Tashkent	‍–‍70 kg
Bronze medal – third place	2016 Zagreb	‍–‍70 kg
Bronze medal – third place	2017 Tashkent	‍–‍70 kg
Bronze medal – third place	2018 Agadir	‍–‍70 kg
Bronze medal – third place	2023 Zagreb	‍–‍70 kg
European U23 Championships
Silver medal – second place	2011 Tyumen	‍–‍70 kg

Profile at external databases
- IJF: 3424
- JudoInside.com: 42412
- Updated on 31 July 2024

Anka Pogačnik (born 23 December 1991) is a Slovenian judoka.

Pogačnik is the ‍–‍70 kg gold medalist of the 2021 Judo Grand Prix Zagreb.
