= Elisavet Teltsidou =

Greek judoka (born 1995)

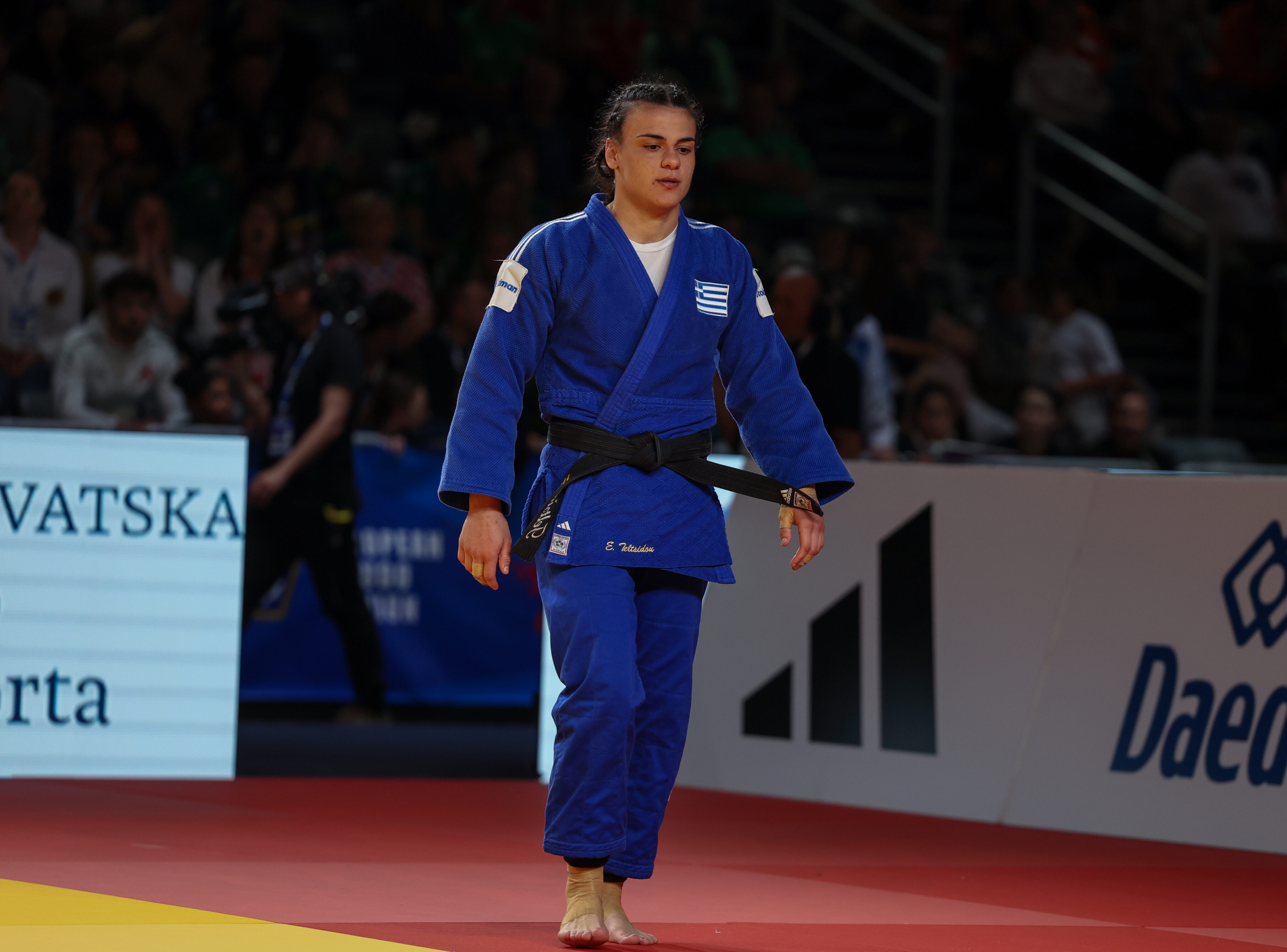

Personal information
- Full name: Elisavet Teltsidou
- Born: 8 November 1995 (age 30)
- Occupation: Judoka

Sport
- Country: Greece
- Sport: Judo
- Weight class: ‍–‍70 kg, ‍–‍78 kg

Achievements and titles
- Olympic Games: 7th (2020)
- World Champ.: 5th (2024)
- European Champ.: (silver) (2024, 2025)
Medal record
Women's judo
Representing Greece
European Championships
Silver medal – second place	2024 Zagreb	‍–‍70 kg
Silver medal – second place	2025 Podgorica	‍–‍70 kg
World Masters
Silver medal – second place	2023 Budapest	‍–‍70 kg
IJF Grand Slam
Gold medal – first place	2022 Abu Dhabi	‍–‍70 kg
Gold medal – first place	2023 Tbilisi	‍–‍70 kg
Gold medal – first place	2023 Astana	‍–‍70 kg
Gold medal – first place	2023 Baku	‍–‍70 kg
Gold medal – first place	2026 Budapest	‍–‍70 kg
Bronze medal – third place	2022 Tokyo	‍–‍70 kg
Bronze medal – third place	2024 Baku	‍–‍70 kg
Bronze medal – third place	2024 Tbilisi	‍–‍70 kg
Bronze medal – third place	2025 Baku	‍–‍78 kg
Bronze medal – third place	2026 Tashkent	‍–‍70 kg
IJF Grand Prix
Gold medal – first place	2019 Antalya	‍–‍70 kg
Gold medal – first place	2019 Tashkent	‍–‍70 kg
Bronze medal – third place	2016 Tbilisi	‍–‍70 kg
Bronze medal – third place	2019 Marrakesh	‍–‍70 kg
Bronze medal – third place	2019 Budapest	‍–‍70 kg
European U23 Championships
Bronze medal – third place	2014 Wrocław	‍–‍63 kg
Bronze medal – third place	2016 Tel Aviv	‍–‍70 kg
European Junior Championships
Silver medal – second place	2015 Oberwart	‍–‍63 kg
Bronze medal – third place	2014 Bucharest	‍–‍63 kg
Mediterranean Games
Gold medal – first place	2026 Taranto	‍–‍70 kg
Bronze medal – third place	2022 Oran	‍–‍70 kg

Profile at external databases
- IJF: 14582
- JudoInside.com: 69284
- Updated on 13 September 2026

Elisavet Teltsidou (born 8 November 1995) is a Greek judoka. In 2021, she competed in the women's 70 kg event at the 2020 Summer Olympics in Tokyo, Japan.

Teltsidou is the gold medallist of the 2019 Antalya Grand Prix in the ‍–‍70 kg category.

Teltsidou won one of the bronze medals in the women's 70 kg event at the 2022 Mediterranean Games held in Oran, Algeria.

Teltsidou won her first Grand Slam gold medal at the 2022 Abu Dhabi Grand Slam, defeating Gabriella Willems of Belgium.
