= Aleksandra Samardžić =

Bosnian judoka (born 1997)

Personal information
- Born: 23 September 1997 (age 29) Berkovići, Bosnia and Herzegovina
- Occupation: Judoka
- Height: 178 cm (5 ft 10 in)

Sport
- Country: Bosnia and Herzegovina
- Sport: Judo
- Weight class: ‍–‍70 kg
- Club: Judo club Bosna
- Coached by: Branislav Crnogorac

Achievements and titles
- Olympic Games: R16 (2024)
- World Champ.: R16 (2014, 2017, 2022, 2025, 2026)
- European Champ.: 7th (2017)
Medal record
Women's judo
Representing Bosnia and Herzegovina
IJF Grand Slam
Bronze medal – third place	2016 Tyumen	‍–‍70 kg
Bronze medal – third place	2017 Baku	‍–‍70 kg
IJF Grand Prix
Bronze medal – third place	2016 Zagreb	‍–‍70 kg
Bronze medal – third place	2024 Linz	‍–‍70 kg
European U23 Championships
Silver medal – second place	2015 Bratislava	‍–‍70 kg
Bronze medal – third place	2014 Wrocław	‍–‍70 kg
Bronze medal – third place	2016 Tel Aviv	‍–‍70 kg
Bronze medal – third place	2017 Podgorica	‍–‍70 kg
World Juniors Championships
Silver medal – second place	2017 Zagreb	‍–‍70 kg
European Junior Championships
Bronze medal – third place	2014 Bucharest	‍–‍70 kg
Bronze medal – third place	2015 Oberwart	‍–‍70 kg
Bronze medal – third place	2017 Maribor	‍–‍70 kg
European Cadet Championships
Silver medal – second place	2012 Bar	‍–‍63 kg
Silver medal – second place	2013 Tallinn	‍–‍70 kg
Bronze medal – third place	2014 Athens	‍–‍70 kg
Youth Olympic Games
Silver medal – second place	2014 Nanjing	‍–‍78 kg

Profile at external databases
- IJF: 13521
- JudoInside.com: 85357
- Updated on 8 October 2026

Aleksandra Samardžić (born 23 September 1997) is a Bosnian judoka.

Samardžić is a bronze medalist from the 2017 Judo Grand Slam Baku in the ‍–‍70 kg category.
