= Lærke Olsen =

Danish judoka (born 1998)

Personal information
- Full name: Lærke Marie Olsen
- Born: 21 June 1998 (age 28)
- Occupation: Judoka
- Height: 170 cm (5 ft 7 in)

Sport
- Country: Denmark
- Sport: Judo
- Weight class: ‍–‍63 kg
- Coached by: Peter Scharinger

Achievements and titles
- Olympic Games: R32 (2020, 2024)
- World Champ.: R16 (2024)
- European Champ.: R16 (2018, 2020)
Medal record
Women's judo
Representing Denmark
World Juniors Championships
Silver medal – second place	2018 Nassau	‍–‍63 kg

Profile at external databases
- IJF: 21664
- JudoInside.com: 66312
- Updated on 31 July 2024

Lærke Marie Olsen (born 21 June 1998) is a Danish judoka. She competed in the women's 63 kg event at the 2020 Summer Olympics held in Tokyo, Japan.

Olsen is the silver medallist of the 2018 World Junior Championships in the ‍–‍63 kg category. In June 2021, she competed in the women's 63 kg event at the 2021 World Judo Championships held in Budapest, Hungary.
