= Judo Grand Slam Tokyo =

Judo competition

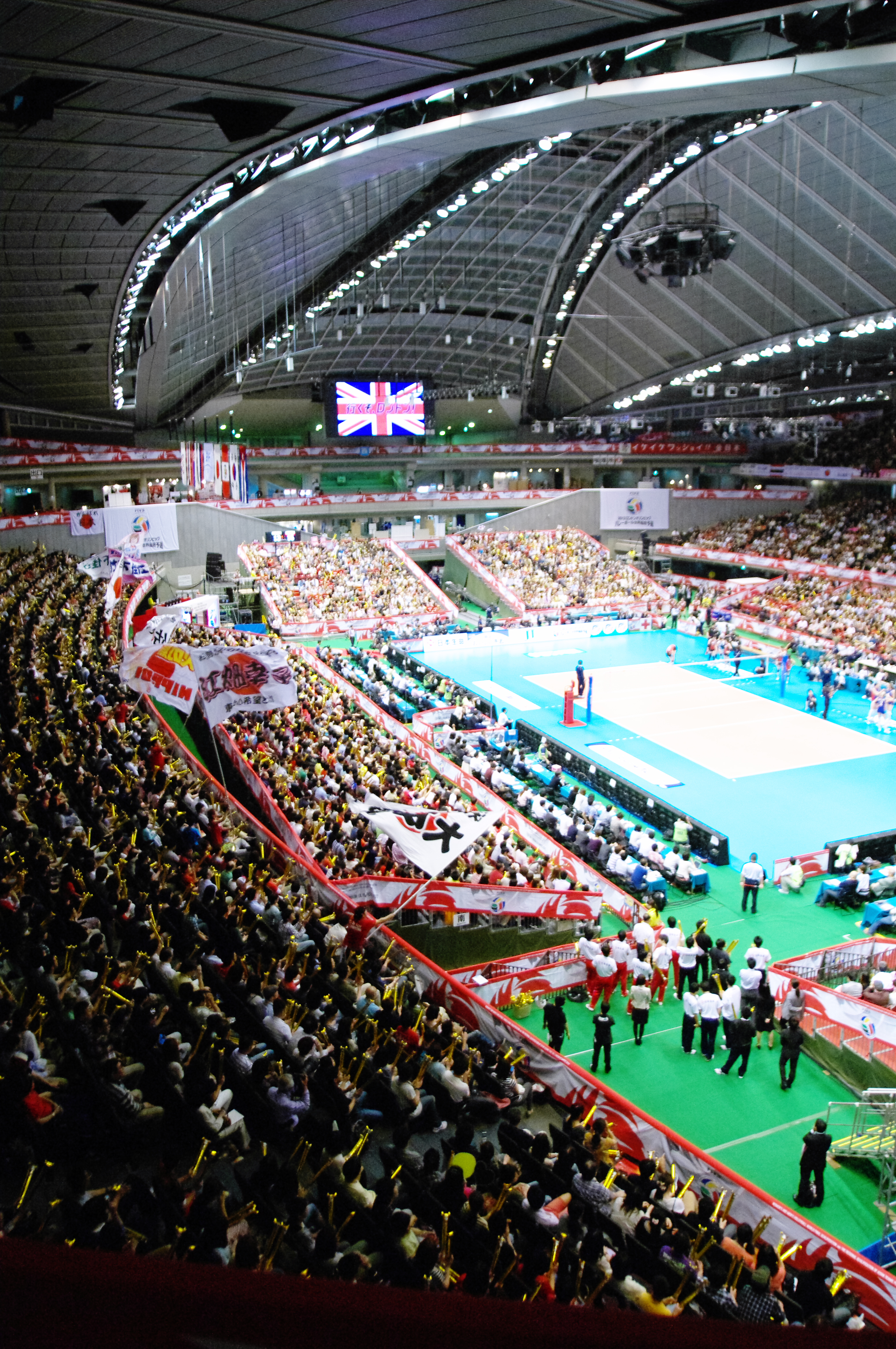
Tokyo Metropolitan Gymnasium

The Grand Slam Tokyo (formerly Jigoro Kano Cup Tokyo International Judo Tournament (嘉納治五郎杯東京国際柔道大会, Kanō Jigorō Hai Tōkyō Kokusai Jūdō Taikai)) is an international judo competition held as part of the International Judo Federation (IJF) World Tour Grand Slam series.

The first Jigoro Kano Cup was held at the Nippon Budōkan from November 23 to 26, 1978 and was a consequence of the canceled 1977 World Judo Championships.

== Venues ==
- 1978–2006: Nippon Budokan
- 2007–2017, 2020–present: Tokyo Metropolitan Gymnasium
- 2018–2019: Maruzen Intec Arena, Osaka

== Past winners ==
=== Men ===
| Year | Extra-lightweight | Half-lightweight | Lightweight | Half-middleweight | Middleweight | Half-heavyweight | Heavyweight | Openweight |
as Jigoro Kano Cup
| 1978 | (Japan) Katsumi Suzuki | (Japan) Katsunori Akimoto | (Japan) Kazuo Yoshimura | (Japan) Shōzō Fujii | (Japan) Isamu Sonoda | (East Germany) Dietmar Lorenz | (Japan) Yasuhiro Yamashita | (Japan) Yasuhiro Yamashita |
| 1982 | (Japan) Shinji Hosokawa | (Japan) Katsuhiko Kashiwazaki | (Japan) Hidetoshi Nakanishi | (Japan) Nobutoshi Hikage | (Soviet Union) Davit Bodaveli | (Japan) Takeshi Suwa | —N/a | (Japan) Yasuhiro Yamashita |
| 1986 | (Brazil) Sérgio Pessoa | (Japan) Yōsuke Yamamoto | (Japan) Toshihiko Koga | (Japan) Hirotaka Okada | (Soviet Union) Alexander Sivtsev | (Japan) Hitoshi Sugai | —N/a | (Japan) Hitoshi Saito |
| 1990 | (Japan) Tadashi Itakusu | (Soviet Union) Sergei Kosmynin | (Japan) Toshihiko Koga | (Japan) Hidehiko Yoshida | (France) Jean-Luc Geymond | (France) Stéphane Traineau | —N/a | (Japan) Naoya Ogawa |
| 1992 | (Japan) Tadashi Itakusu | (Japan) Kenji Maruyama | (Japan) Daisuke Hideshima | (Japan) Tatsuto Mochida | (Japan) Masahiko Nakamashi | (Poland) Paweł Nastula | —N/a | (Belgium) Harry Van Barneveld |
| 1994 | (Japan) Ryuji Sonoda | (Japan) Yukimasa Nakamura | (Germany) Martin Schmidt | (Japan) Yoichi Nakamura | (Japan) Hidehiko Yoshida | (Japan) Shigeru Okaizumi | (Germany) Frank Möller | (Japan) Yoshiharu Makishi |
| 1996 | (Japan) Tadahiro Nomura | (Japan) Yukimasa Nakamura | (South Korea) Kim Dae-wook | (Japan) Kazunori Kubota | (France) Vincenzo Carabetta | (Japan) Yoshio Nakamura | (Japan) Yoshiharu Makishi | (Japan) Shinichi Shinohara |
| 1999 | (Japan) Masato Uchishiba | (France) Larbi Benboudaoud | (Uzbekistan) Andrey Shturbabin | (Japan) Masahiko Tomouchi | (Netherlands) Mark Huizinga | (Japan) Tomokazu Inoue | (Japan) Yasuyuki Muneta | —N/a |
| 2001 | —N/a | | | | | | | (Japan) Yoshinori Shimode |
| 2003 | (Japan) Takeshi Ogawa | (Japan) Tomoo Torii | (Japan) Yusuke Kanamaru | (Japan) Kenzo Nakamura | (Japan) Yuta Yazaki | (Japan) Keiji Suzuki | (Japan) Yasuyuki Muneta | —N/a |
| 2005 | —N/a | | | | | | | (Japan) Kōsei Inoue |
| 2006 | (Austria) Ludwig Paischer | (Japan) Hiroyuki Akimoto | (Italy) Francesco Bruyere | (Japan) Hirotaka Kato | (South Korea) Hwang Hee-tae | (Japan) Takamasa Anai | (Japan) Yohei Takai | —N/a |
| 2007 | (Japan) Hiroaki Hiraoka | (Poland) Tomasz Kowalski | (South Korea) Wang Ki-chun | (South Korea) Song Dae-nam | (Greece) Ilias Iliadis | (Japan) Daisuke Kobayashi | (Japan) Satoshi Ishii | —N/a |
| 2008 | (Japan) Kisei Akimoto | (Japan) Tatsuaki Egusa | (South Korea) Wang Ki-chun | (Japan) Masahiko Tomouchi | (Japan) Takashi Ono | (Japan) Takamasa Anai | (Japan) Yohei Takai | —N/a |
as Judo Grand Slam
| 2009 | (Japan) Masaaki Fukuoka | (Japan) Masashi Ebinuma | (South Korea) Wang Ki-chun | (United Kingdom) Euan Burton | (Japan) Takashi Ono | (South Korea) Hwang Hee-tae | (Japan) Kazuhiko Takahashi | —N/a |
| 2010 | (Japan) Hirofumi Yamamoto | (Japan) Masaaki Fukuoka | (Japan) Riki Nakaya | (Japan) Takahiro Nakai | (Japan) Masashi Nishiyama | (Japan) Takamasa Anai | (South Korea) Kim Sung-min | —N/a |
| 2011 | (Japan) Hirofumi Yamamoto | (Japan) Tomofumi Takajo | (Japan) Hiroyuki Akimoto | (Japan) Tomohiro Kawakami | (Japan) Masashi Nishiyama | (Russia) Sergei Samoilovich | (Russia) Alexander Mikhaylin | —N/a |
| 2012 | (Japan) Naohisa Takato | (Japan) Junpei Morishita | (Japan) Shohei Ono | (South Korea) Kim Jae-bum | (South Korea) Lee Kyu-won | (Japan) Daisuke Kobayashi | (South Korea) Kim Sung-min | —N/a |
| 2013 | (Japan) Naohisa Takato | (Japan) Tomofumi Takajo | (Japan) Riki Nakaya | (Japan) Takanori Nagase | (Japan) Mashu Baker | (Czech Republic) Lukáš Krpálek | (South Korea) Kim Sung-min | —N/a |
| 2014 | (South Korea) Won-Jin Kim | (Japan) Hifumi Abe | (Japan) Hiroyuki Akimoto | (Japan) Takanori Nagase | (South Korea) Dong-han Gwak | (South Korea) Cho Gu-ham | (Russia) Renat Saidov | —N/a |
| 2015 | (Japan) Naohisa Takato | (Japan) Tomofumi Takajo | (Japan) Hiroyuki Akimoto | (Georgia (country)) Avtandili Tchrikishvili | (Japan) Mashu Baker | (Japan) Ryunosuke Haga | (Japan) Hisayoshi Harasawa | —N/a |
| 2016 | (Japan) Ryuju Nagayama | (Japan) Hifumi Abe | (Japan) Soichi Hashimoto | (Japan) Takanori Nagase | (Serbia) Aleksandar Kukolj | (Russia) Kirill Denisov | (Japan) Takeshi Ōjitani | —N/a |
| 2017 | (Japan) Naohisa Takato | (Japan) Hifumi Abe | (Japan) Arata Tatsukawa | (Mongolia) Otgonbaataryn Uuganbaatar | (Japan) Kenta Nagasawa | (South Korea) Cho Gu-ham | (Japan) Yusei Ogawa | —N/a |
| 2018 | (Japan) Ryuju Nagayama | (Japan) Joshiro Maruyama | (Japan) Shohei Ono | (Japan) Takeshi Sasaki | (Japan) Shoichiro Mukai | (Japan) Aaron Wolf | (Netherlands) Henk Grol | —N/a |
| 2019 | (Japan) Naohisa Takato | (Japan) Hifumi Abe | (Japan) Masashi Ebinuma | (Japan) Takanori Nagase | (Georgia (country)) Beka Gviniashvili | (Japan) Ryunosuke Haga | (Russia) Inal Tasoev | —N/a |
| 2022 | (South Korea) Jeon Seung-beom | (Japan) Joshiro Maruyama | (Japan) Soichi Hashimoto | (Japan) Kenya Kohara | (Japan) Kosuke Mashiyama | (Italy) Gennaro Pirelli | (Japan) Hyōga Ōta | —N/a |
| 2023 | (Japan) Ryuju Nagayama | (Japan) Hifumi Abe | (Azerbaijan) Hidayat Heydarov | (South Korea) Lee Joon-hwan | (Japan) Sanshiro Murao | Matvey Kanikovskiy | Tamerlan Bashaev | —N/a |
| 2024 | (Japan) Taiki Nakamura | (Japan) Takeshi Takeoka | (Japan) Ryuga Tanaka | (Japan) Sotaro Fujiwara | (Japan) Sanshiro Murao | Matvey Kanikovskiy | (Japan) Kanta Nakano | —N/a |

=== Women ===
| Year | Extra-lightweight | Half-lightweight | Lightweight | Half-middleweight | Middleweight | Half-heavyweight | Heavyweight |
as Jigoro Kano Cup
| 2007 | (Cuba) Yanet Bermoy | (Japan) Misato Nakamura | (Japan) Aiko Sato | (Japan) Yoshie Ueno | (Japan) Masae Ueno | (France) Céline Lebrun | (Japan) Mai Tateyama |
| 2008 | (Japan) Tomoko Fukumi | (Japan) Yuka Nishida | (Japan) Kaori Matsumoto | (Slovenia) Urška Žolnir | (France) Lucie Décosse | (China) Yang Xiuli | (Russia) Elena Ivashchenko |
as Judo Grand Slam
| 2009 | (Japan) Tomoko Fukumi | (Japan) Misato Nakamura | (Japan) Hitomi Tokuhisa | (Japan) Yoshie Ueno | (Japan) Mina Watanabe | (Japan) Akari Ogata | (Japan) Maki Tsukada |
| 2010 | (Japan) Tomoko Fukumi | (Japan) Yuka Nishida | (Japan) Kaori Matsumoto | (France) Clarisse Agbegnenou | (Japan) Haruka Tachimoto | (France) Audrey Tcheuméo | (Japan) Megumi Tachimoto |
| 2011 | (Japan) Haruna Asami | (Japan) Takumi Miyakawa | (Japan) Kaori Matsumoto | (Slovenia) Urška Žolnir | (Japan) Tomoe Ueno | (Japan) Akari Ogata | (Japan) Mika Sugimoto |
| 2012 | (Japan) Haruna Asami | (Japan) Yuki Hashimoto | (Japan) Anzu Yamamoto | (Japan) Megumi Horikawa | (Netherlands) Linda Bolder | (Japan) Ruika Sato | (Japan) Megumi Tachimoto |
| 2013 | (Japan) Ami Kondo | (Japan) Yuki Hashimoto | (Japan) Nae Udaka | (Japan) Kana Abe | (Japan) Chizuru Arai | (Netherlands) Marhinde Verkerk | (Japan) Megumi Tachimoto |
| 2014 | (Japan) Ami Kondo | (Japan) Yuki Hashimoto | (Japan) Kaori Matsumoto | (Slovenia) Tina Trstenjak | (France) Gévrise Émane | (United States) Kayla Harrison | (Japan) Nami Inamori |
| 2015 | (Japan) Ami Kondo | (Japan) Misato Nakamura | (Japan) Tsukasa Yoshida | (Germany) Martyna Trajdos | (Japan) Chizuru Arai | (United States) Kayla Harrison | (Japan) Nami Inamori |
| 2016 | (Mongolia) Mönkhbatyn Urantsetseg | (Japan) Natsumi Tsunoda | (Japan) Tsukasa Yoshida | (Austria) Kathrin Unterwurzacher | (Japan) Saki Niizoe | (Japan) Ruika Sato | (Japan) Sarah Asahina |
| 2017 | (Japan) Ami Kondo | (Japan) Uta Abe | (Japan) Tsukasa Yoshida | (Japan) Miku Tashiro | (Japan) Yoko Ono | (Japan) Shori Hamada | (Japan) Sarah Asahina |
| 2018 | (Japan) Funa Tonaki | (Japan) Uta Abe | (Canada) Jessica Klimkait | (Japan) Masako Doi | (Japan) Chizuru Arai | (Japan) Ruika Sato | (Cuba) Idalys Ortiz |
| 2019 | (Japan) Funa Tonaki | (France) Amandine Buchard | (Japan) Momo Tamaoki | (Japan) Masako Doi | (Japan) Yoko Ono | (Japan) Mami Umeki | (Japan) Akira Sone |
| 2022 | (Japan) Kano Miyaki | (Japan) Uta Abe | (Japan) Haruka Funakubo | (Japan) Miku Takaichi | (Japan) Saki Niizoe | (Japan) Rika Takayama | (Japan) Akira Sone |
| 2023 | (Japan) Natsumi Tsunoda | (Japan) Uta Abe | (Canada) Christa Deguchi | (Japan) Miku Takaichi | (Netherlands) Sanne van Dijke | (Brazil) Mayra Aguiar | (Japan) Mao Arai |
| 2024 | (Japan) Wakana Koga | (Japan) Kisumi Omori | (Japan) Mika Adachi | (Japan) Haruka Kaju | (Japan) Mayu Honda | (Japan) Kurena Ikeda | (Japan) Mao Arai |
