= Norihito Isoda =

Japanese judoka (born 1995)

Personal information
- Nationality: Japanese
- Born: 6 August 1995 (age 30)
- Occupation: Judoka

Sport
- Country: Japan
- Sport: Judo
- Weight class: ‍–‍66 kg
Medal record
Men's judo
Representing Japan
IJF Grand Slam
Bronze medal – third place	2017 Tokyo	‍–‍66 kg
Bronze medal – third place	2018 Paris	‍–‍66 kg
IJF Grand Prix
Silver medal – second place	2017 Düsseldorf	‍–‍66 kg
Asian Junior Championships
Silver medal – second place	2012 Taipei	‍–‍73 kg
World Cadets Championships
Silver medal – second place	2011 Kyiv	‍–‍66 kg
Summer Universiade
Bronze medal – third place	2017 Taipei	‍–‍66 kg

Profile at external databases
- IJF: 7347
- JudoInside.com: 79556
- Updated on 26 November 2022

Norihito Isoda (born 6 August 1995) is a Japanese judoka.

Isoda is a bronze medalist from the 2018 Judo Grand Slam Paris in the ‍–‍66 kg category.
