= Kokoro Kageura =

Japanese judoka (born 1995)

Personal information
- Nationality: Japanese
- Born: 6 December 1995 (age 30) Ehime, Japan
- Occupation: Judoka

Sport
- Country: Japan
- Sport: Judo
- Weight class: +100 kg

Achievements and titles
- World Champ.: (2021)
- Asian Champ.: (gold) (2016, 2022)
Medal record
Men's judo
Representing Japan
World Championships
Gold medal – first place	2019 Tokyo	Mixed team
Gold medal – first place	2021 Budapest	+100 kg
Gold medal – first place	2021 Budapest	Mixed team
Gold medal – first place	2023 Doha	Mixed team
Asian Championships
Gold medal – first place	2016 Tashkent	+100 kg
Gold medal – first place	2022 Nur‑Sultan	+100 kg
World Masters
Bronze medal – third place	2019 Qingdao	+100 kg
Bronze medal – third place	2022 Jerusalem	+100 kg
IJF Grand Slam
Gold medal – first place	2018 Paris	+100 kg
Gold medal – first place	2021 Tashkent	+100 kg
Silver medal – second place	2016 Tokyo	+100 kg
Silver medal – second place	2020 Paris	+100 kg
Silver medal – second place	2022 Tokyo	+100 kg
Bronze medal – third place	2017 Tokyo	+100 kg
Bronze medal – third place	2018 Osaka	+100 kg
Bronze medal – third place	2019 Paris	+100 kg
Bronze medal – third place	2019 Osaka	+100 kg
Bronze medal – third place	2022 Paris	+100 kg
Bronze medal – third place	2024 Tashkent	+100 kg
IJF Grand Prix
Gold medal – first place	2017 Düsseldorf	+100 kg
Gold medal – first place	2018 Budapest	+100 kg
Silver medal – second place	2019 Budapest	+100 kg
Summer Universiade
Gold medal – first place	2017 Taipei	+100 kg

Profile at external databases
- IJF: 30771
- JudoInside.com: 100963
- Updated on 4 March 2024

Kokoro Kageura (影浦 心, Kageura Kokoro; born 6 December 1995) is a Japanese judoka.

He won a medal at the 2019 World Judo Championships. He won the 2021 World Judo Championships in the heavyweight division.

In 2017, he won the gold medal in the men's +100 kg event at the Summer Universiade held in Taipei, Taiwan.

In 2020, he became world-renowned after ending the 10-year unbeaten streak of legendary French judoka Teddy Riner during the 2020 Judo Grand Slam Paris, defeating him via ippon.
