= Rina Tatsukawa =

Japanese judoka (born 1996)

Personal information
- Born: 14 July 1996 (age 29)
- Occupation: Judoka

Sport
- Country: Japan
- Sport: Judo
- Weight class: ‍–‍48 kg, ‍–‍52 kg

Achievements and titles
- Asian Champ.: (bronze) (2019)
Medal record
Women's judo
Representing Japan
Asian Championships
| Bronze medal – third place | 2019 Fujairah | ‍–‍52 kg |
IJF Grand Slam
| Gold medal – first place | 2021 Baku | ‍–‍48 kg |
| Silver medal – second place | 2017 Tokyo | ‍–‍52 kg |
| Silver medal – second place | 2022 Tokyo | ‍–‍48 kg |
| Bronze medal – third place | 2016 Tokyo | ‍–‍52 kg |
| Bronze medal – third place | 2018 Ekaterinburg | ‍–‍52 kg |
World Cadets Championships
| Bronze medal – third place | 2013 Miami | ‍–‍57 kg |
Summer Universiade
| Gold medal – first place | 2017 Taipei | ‍–‍52 kg |

Profile at external databases
- IJF: 13219
- JudoInside.com: 35325
- Updated on 4 December 2022

Rina Tatsukawa (born 14 July 1996) is a Japanese judoka.

Tatsukawa is the gold medalist from the 2021 Judo Grand Slam Baku in the ‍–‍48 kg category.
