= 2019 World Judo Championships =

2019 edition of the World Judo Championships

Judo 2019 World Judo Championships
- Venue: Nippon Budokan
- Location: Tokyo, Japan
- Dates: 25 August – 1 September 2019
- Competitors: 828 from 143 nations
- Total prize money: 998,000$

Champions
- Mixed team: Japan (3rd title)

Competition at external databases
- Links: IJF • EJU • JudoInside

The 2019 World Judo Championships were held in Tokyo, Japan from 25 August to 1 September 2019.

== Schedule ==
All times are local (UTC+9).

Date	Starting time	Event
25 August	11:00	Men −60 kg
25 August	11:00	Women −48 kg
26 August	11:00	Men −66 kg
26 August	11:00	Women −52 kg
27 August	11:00	Men −73 kg
27 August	11:00	Women −57 kg
28 August	11:00	Men −81 kg
28 August	11:00	Women −63 kg
29 August	12:00	Men −90 kg
29 August	12:00	Women −70 kg
30 August	12:00	Men −100 kg
30 August	12:00	Women −78 kg
31 August	12:00	Men +100 kg
31 August	12:00	Women +78 kg
1 September	13:00	Mixed team

== Medal summary ==
=== Medal table ===
* Host nation (Japan)

Rank	Nation	Gold	Silver	Bronze	Total
1	Japan*	5	6	5	16
2	France	3	1	2	6
3	Portugal	1	1	0	2
4	Netherlands	1	0	3	4
5	Canada	1	0	1	2
5	Georgia	1	0	1	2
7	Czech Republic	1	0	0	1
7	Israel	1	0	0	1
7	Ukraine	1	0	0	1
10	Russia	0	2	2	4
11	Azerbaijan	0	1	1	2
11	South Korea	0	1	1	2
13	Belgium	0	1	0	1
13	Cuba	0	1	0	1
13	Uzbekistan	0	1	0	1
16	Brazil	0	0	3	3
16	Kosovo	0	0	3	3
18	Germany	0	0	1	1
18	Great Britain	0	0	1	1
18	Kazakhstan	0	0	1	1
18	Moldova	0	0	1	1
18	Mongolia	0	0	1	1
18	Poland	0	0	1	1
18	Serbia	0	0	1	1
18	Turkey	0	0	1	1
Totals (25 entries)		15	15	30	60

=== Men's events ===
Event	Gold	Silver	Bronze
Extra-lightweight (60 kg)	Lukhumi Chkhvimiani; Georgia	Sharafuddin Lutfillaev; Uzbekistan	Yeldos Smetov; Kazakhstan
Extra-lightweight (60 kg)	Lukhumi Chkhvimiani; Georgia	Sharafuddin Lutfillaev; Uzbekistan	Ryuju Nagayama; Japan
Half-lightweight (66 kg)	Joshiro Maruyama; Japan	Kim Lim-hwan; South Korea	Hifumi Abe; Japan
Half-lightweight (66 kg)	Joshiro Maruyama; Japan	Kim Lim-hwan; South Korea	Denis Vieru; Moldova
Lightweight (73 kg)	Shohei Ono; Japan	Rustam Orujov; Azerbaijan	Hidayat Heydarov; Azerbaijan
Lightweight (73 kg)	Shohei Ono; Japan	Rustam Orujov; Azerbaijan	Denis Yartsev; Russia
Half-middleweight (81 kg)	Sagi Muki; Israel	Matthias Casse; Belgium	Antoine Valois-Fortier; Canada
Half-middleweight (81 kg)	Sagi Muki; Israel	Matthias Casse; Belgium	Luka Maisuradze; Georgia
Middleweight (90 kg)	Noël van 't End; Netherlands	Shoichiro Mukai; Japan	Axel Clerget; France
Middleweight (90 kg)	Noël van 't End; Netherlands	Shoichiro Mukai; Japan	Nemanja Majdov; Serbia
Half-heavyweight (100 kg)	Jorge Fonseca; Portugal	Niyaz Ilyasov; Russia	Michael Korrel; Netherlands
Half-heavyweight (100 kg)	Jorge Fonseca; Portugal	Niyaz Ilyasov; Russia	Aaron Wolf; Japan
Heavyweight (+100 kg)	Lukáš Krpálek; Czech Republic	Hisayoshi Harasawa; Japan	Kim Min-jong; South Korea
Heavyweight (+100 kg)	Lukáš Krpálek; Czech Republic	Hisayoshi Harasawa; Japan	Roy Meyer; Netherlands

=== Women's events ===
Event	Gold	Silver	Bronze
Extra-lightweight (48 kg)	Daria Bilodid; Ukraine	Funa Tonaki; Japan	Mönkhbatyn Urantsetseg; Mongolia
Extra-lightweight (48 kg)	Daria Bilodid; Ukraine	Funa Tonaki; Japan	Distria Krasniqi; Kosovo
Half-lightweight (52 kg)	Uta Abe; Japan	Natalia Kuziutina; Russia	Majlinda Kelmendi; Kosovo
Half-lightweight (52 kg)	Uta Abe; Japan	Natalia Kuziutina; Russia	Ai Shishime; Japan
Lightweight (57 kg)	Christa Deguchi; Canada	Tsukasa Yoshida; Japan	Julia Kowalczyk; Poland
Lightweight (57 kg)	Christa Deguchi; Canada	Tsukasa Yoshida; Japan	Rafaela Silva; Brazil
Half-middleweight (63 kg)	Clarisse Agbegnenou; France	Miku Tashiro; Japan	Martyna Trajdos; Germany
Half-middleweight (63 kg)	Clarisse Agbegnenou; France	Miku Tashiro; Japan	Juul Franssen; Netherlands
Middleweight (70 kg)	Marie-Ève Gahié; France	Bárbara Timo; Portugal	Sally Conway; Great Britain
Middleweight (70 kg)	Marie-Ève Gahié; France	Bárbara Timo; Portugal	Margaux Pinot; France
Half-heavyweight (78 kg)	Madeleine Malonga; France	Shori Hamada; Japan	Loriana Kuka; Kosovo
Half-heavyweight (78 kg)	Madeleine Malonga; France	Shori Hamada; Japan	Mayra Aguiar; Brazil
Heavyweight (+78 kg)	Akira Sone; Japan	Idalys Ortiz; Cuba	Kayra Sayit; Turkey
Heavyweight (+78 kg)	Akira Sone; Japan	Idalys Ortiz; Cuba	Sarah Asahina; Japan

=== Mixed events ===
Event	Gold	Silver	Bronze
Mixed team	Japan; Chizuru Arai; Shori Hamada; Hisayoshi Harasawa; Soichi Hashimoto; Kokoro Kageura; Shoichiro Mukai; Sanshiro Murao; Shohei Ono; Yoko Ono; Akira Sone; Momo Tamaoki; Tsukasa Yoshida	France; Amandine Buchard; Guillaume Chaine; Axel Clerget; Sarah Cysique; Alpha Oumar Djalo; Marie-Ève Gahié; Alexandre Iddir; Kilian Le Blouch; Anne Fatoumata M'Bairo; Madeleine Malonga; Cyrille Maret; Margaux Pinot	Russia; Ksenia Chibisova; Kirill Denisov; Lechi Ediev; Anna Gushchina; Mikhail Igolnikov; Khusen Khalmurzaev; Anastasia Konkina; Daria Mezhetskaia; Evgeny Prokopchuk; Alena Prokopenko; Madina Taimazova; Inal Tasoev
Mixed team	Japan; Chizuru Arai; Shori Hamada; Hisayoshi Harasawa; Soichi Hashimoto; Kokoro Kageura; Shoichiro Mukai; Sanshiro Murao; Shohei Ono; Yoko Ono; Akira Sone; Momo Tamaoki; Tsukasa Yoshida	France; Amandine Buchard; Guillaume Chaine; Axel Clerget; Sarah Cysique; Alpha Oumar Djalo; Marie-Ève Gahié; Alexandre Iddir; Kilian Le Blouch; Anne Fatoumata M'Bairo; Madeleine Malonga; Cyrille Maret; Margaux Pinot	Brazil; Maria Suelen Altheman; Eduardo Barbosa; Tamires Crude; Rafael Macedo; David Moura; Maria Portela; Ellen Santana; Eduardo Yudy Santos; Jeferson Santos Junior; Rafael Silva; Rafaela Silva; Beatriz Souza

== Prize money ==
The sums written are per medalist, bringing the total prizes awarded to 798,000$ for the individual events and 200,000$ for the team event. (retrieved from:)

Medal	Individual			Mixed team		
Medal	Total	Judoka	Coach	Total	Judoka	Coach
Gold	26,000$	20,800$	5,200$	90,000$	72,000$	18,000$
Silver	15,000$	12,000$	3,000$	60,000$	48,000$	12,000$
Bronze	8,000$	6,400$	1,600$	25,000$	20,000$	5,000$
