= Abdula Abdulzhalilov =

Russian judoka (born 1990)

Personal information
- Born: 25 October 1990 (age 35)
- Occupation: Judoka

Sport
- Country: Russia
- Sport: Judo
- Weight class: ‍–‍66 kg

Achievements and titles
- European Champ.: R16 (2020)
Medal record
Men's judo
Representing Russia
IJF Grand Slam
Gold medal – first place	2017 Ekaterinburg	‍–‍66 kg
Gold medal – first place	2020 Budapest	‍–‍66 kg
Bronze medal – third place	2017 Abu Dhabi	‍–‍66 kg
Bronze medal – third place	2018 Ekaterinburg	‍–‍66 kg
IJF Grand Prix
Gold medal – first place	2013 Miami	‍–‍66 kg
Gold medal – first place	2016 Qingdao	‍–‍66 kg
Gold medal – first place	2017 Antalya	‍–‍66 kg
Silver medal – second place	2021 Zagreb	‍–‍66 kg
Bronze medal – third place	2015 Samsun	‍–‍66 kg
Bronze medal – third place	2016 Zagreb	‍–‍66 kg
European U23 Championships
Bronze medal – third place	2012 Prague	‍–‍66 kg
Summer Universiade
Bronze medal – third place	2017 Taipei	‍–‍66 kg

Profile at external databases
- IJF: 1377
- JudoInside.com: 46273
- Updated on 21 November 2022

Abdula Abdulzhalilov (born 25 October 1990) is a Russian judoka. He is the gold medalist in the ‍–‍66 kg from the 2017 Judo Grand Prix Antalya
