= Maelle Di Cintio =

French judoka (born 1991)

Personal information
- Born: 20 April 1991 (age 35)
- Occupation: Judoka

Sport
- Country: France
- Sport: Judo
- Weight class: ‍–‍63 kg

Achievements and titles
- European Champ.: R32 (2013)
Medal record
Women's judo
Representing France
IJF Grand Slam
Bronze medal – third place	2018 Ekaterinburg	‍–‍63 kg
IJF Grand Prix
Silver medal – second place	2012 Abu Dhabi	‍–‍63 kg
Bronze medal – third place	2014 Budapest	‍–‍63 kg
Bronze medal – third place	2014 Zagreb	‍–‍63 kg
European U23 Championships
Silver medal – second place	2013 Samokov	‍–‍63 kg
Summer Universiade
Gold medal – first place	2013 Kazan	‍–‍63 kg
Bronze medal – third place	2013 Kazan	Women's team

Profile at external databases
- IJF: 10001
- JudoInside.com: 54623
- Updated on 26 November 2022

Maelle Di Cintio (born 20 April 1991) is a French judoka.

Di Cintio is the silver medalist from the 2018 Judo Grand Slam Ekaterinburg in the ‍–‍63 kg category.
