= Kentaro Iida =

Japanese judoka (born 1998)

Personal information
- Born: 4 May 1998 (age 28)
- Occupation: Judoka

Sport
- Country: Japan
- Sport: Judo
- Weight class: ‍–‍100 kg

Achievements and titles
- World Champ.: R16 (2021)
- Asian Champ.: (gold) (2018)
Medal record
Men's judo
Representing Japan
Asian Games
Gold medal – first place	2018 Jakarta	‍–‍100 kg
World Masters
Bronze medal – third place	2018 Guangzhou	‍–‍100 kg
IJF Grand Slam
Gold medal – first place	2017 Paris	‍–‍100 kg
Gold medal – first place	2019 Düsseldorf	‍–‍100 kg
Gold medal – first place	2019 Brasilia	‍–‍100 kg
Gold medal – first place	2022 Budapest	‍–‍100 kg
Silver medal – second place	2022 Tokyo	‍–‍100 kg
Bronze medal – third place	2016 Tokyo	‍–‍100 kg
Bronze medal – third place	2018 Osaka	‍–‍100 kg
Bronze medal – third place	2019 Osaka	‍–‍100 kg
Bronze medal – third place	2021 Baku	‍–‍100 kg
Bronze medal – third place	2022 Paris	‍–‍100 kg
IJF Grand Prix
Bronze medal – third place	2018 Zagreb	‍–‍100 kg
Summer Universiade
Silver medal – second place	2017 Taipei	‍–‍100 kg

Profile at external databases
- IJF: 28254
- JudoInside.com: 97050
- Updated on 4 December 2022

Kentaro Iida (born 4 May 1998) is a Japanese judoka.

Iida is the gold medalist of the 2017 Judo Grand Slam Paris in the ‍–‍100 kg category.
