= Shohei Shimowada =

Japanese judoka

Personal information
- Nationality: Japanese
- Born: 25 October 1990 (age 35)
- Occupation: Judoka

Sport
- Country: Japan
- Sport: Judo
- Weight class: –90 kg, –100 kg

Achievements and titles
- Asian Champ.: (gold) (2013)
Medal record
Men's judo
Representing Japan
Asian Championships
Gold medal – first place	2013 Bangkok	–90 kg
IJF Grand Slam
Bronze medal – third place	2012 Tokyo	–90 kg
Bronze medal – third place	2016 Tokyo	–100 kg
IJF Grand Prix
Bronze medal – third place	2014 Ulaanbaatar	–90 kg
Summer Universiade
Gold medal – first place	2013 Kazan	Men's team

Profile at external databases
- IJF: 11243
- JudoInside.com: 90547
- Updated on 25 November 2022

Shohei Shimowada (born 23 October 1990) is a Japanese judoka.

He is the bronze medallist of the 2016 Judo Grand Slam Tokyo in the -100 kg category.
