= Judo at the 2018 Asian Games – Men's 100 kg =

Judo competition

Men's 100 kg at the 2018 Asian Games
- Venue: Jakarta Convention Center
- Date: 31 August 2018
- Competitors: 17 from 17 nations

Medalists
gold medal	Kentaro Iida	Japan
silver medal	Cho Gu-ham	South Korea
bronze medal	Lkhagvasürengiin Otgonbaatar	Mongolia
bronze medal	Sherali Juraev	Uzbekistan

The men's 100 kilograms (Half heavyweight) competition at the 2018 Asian Games in Jakarta was held on 31 August at the Jakarta Convention Center Assembly Hall.

== Schedule ==
All times are Western Indonesia Time (UTC+07:00)

Date	Time	Event
Friday, 31 August 2018	09:00	Elimination round of 32
Friday, 31 August 2018	09:00	Elimination round of 16
Friday, 31 August 2018	09:00	Quarterfinals
Friday, 31 August 2018	09:00	Repechage
Friday, 31 August 2018	09:00	Semifinals
Friday, 31 August 2018	16:00	Finals

== Results ==
=== Main bracket ===
==== Final ====
Gold medal contest
Cho Gu-ham (KOR)	00
Kentaro Iida (JPN)	10

==== Top half ====
Elimination round of 32

Elimination round of 16
Cho Gu-ham (KOR)	10
Gede Ganding Kalbu Soethama (INA)	00
Saidzhalol Saidov (TJK)	10
Jad Fadel (LBN)	00
Ivan Remarenco (UAE)	10
Avtar Singh (IND)	00
Viktor Demyanenko (KAZ)	10
Shah Hussain Shah (PAK)	00

Quarterfinals
Cho Gu-ham (KOR)	01
Saidzhalol Saidov (TJK)	00
Ivan Remarenco (UAE)	01
Viktor Demyanenko (KAZ)	00

Semifinals
Cho Gu-ham (KOR)	10
Ivan Remarenco (UAE)	00

==== Bottom half ====
Elimination round of 32
Lu Guan-zhi (TPE)	10
Asadullah Tajik (AFG)	01

Elimination round of 16
Kentaro Iida (JPN)	10
Li Huilin (CHN)	00
Batyr Hojamuhammedow (TKM)	10
Lu Guan-zhi (TPE)	00
Lkhagvasürengiin Otgonbaatar (MGL)	10
Wei Puyang (THA)	00
Sherali Juraev (UZB)	10
Ravin Shrestha (NEP)	00

Quarterfinals
Kentaro Iida (JPN)	10
Batyr Hojamuhammedow (TKM)	00
Lkhagvasürengiin Otgonbaatar (MGL)	10
Sherali Juraev (UZB)	00

Semifinals
Kentaro Iida (JPN)	10
Lkhagvasürengiin Otgonbaatar (MGL)	00

=== Repechage ===
Repechage
Saidzhalol Saidov (TJK)	10
Viktor Demyanenko (KAZ)	00
Batyr Hojamuhammedow (TKM)	00
Sherali Juraev (UZB)	10

Bronze medal contests
Saidzhalol Saidov (TJK)	00
Lkhagvasürengiin Otgonbaatar (MGL)	10
Sherali Juraev (UZB)	10
Ivan Remarenco (UAE)	00
