= 2018 Judo Grand Slam Paris =

Judo competition

Judo 2018 Judo Grand Slam Paris
- Venue: AccorHotels Arena of Bercy, Paris
- Location: Paris, France
- Dates: 10–11 February 2018
- Competitors: 403 from 71 nations

Competition at external databases
- Links: IJF • EJU • JudoInside

The 2018 Judo Grand Slam Paris was held in Paris, France, from 10 to 11 February 2018.

== Medal summary ==
=== Men's events ===
Event	Gold	Silver	Bronze
Extra-lightweight (−60 kg)	Toru Shishime (JPN)	Sharafuddin Lutfillaev (UZB)	Ashley McKenzie (GBR)
Extra-lightweight (−60 kg)	Toru Shishime (JPN)	Sharafuddin Lutfillaev (UZB)	Cédric Revol (FRA)
Half-lightweight (−66 kg)	An Ba-ul (KOR)	Joshiro Maruyama (JPN)	Norihito Isoda (JPN)
Half-lightweight (−66 kg)	An Ba-ul (KOR)	Joshiro Maruyama (JPN)	Sebastian Seidl (GER)
Lightweight (−73 kg)	Akil Gjakova (KOS)	Lasha Shavdatuashvili (GEO)	An Chang-rim (KOR)
Lightweight (−73 kg)	Akil Gjakova (KOS)	Lasha Shavdatuashvili (GEO)	Tsend-Ochiryn Tsogtbaatar (MGL)
Half-middleweight (−81 kg)	Sotaro Fujiwara (JPN)	Lee Seung-su (KOR)	Frank de Wit (NED)
Half-middleweight (−81 kg)	Sotaro Fujiwara (JPN)	Lee Seung-su (KOR)	Nugzar Tatalashvili (GEO)
Middleweight (−90 kg)	Shoichiro Mukai (JPN)	Beka Gviniashvili (GEO)	Eduard Trippel (GER)
Middleweight (−90 kg)	Shoichiro Mukai (JPN)	Beka Gviniashvili (GEO)	Axel Clerget (FRA)
Half-heavyweight (−100 kg)	Michael Korrel (NED)	Cho Gu-ham (KOR)	Cyrille Maret (FRA)
Half-heavyweight (−100 kg)	Michael Korrel (NED)	Cho Gu-ham (KOR)	Varlam Liparteliani (GEO)
Heavyweight (+100 kg)	Kokoro Kageura (JPN)	Kim Sung-min (KOR)	Lukáš Krpálek (CZE)
Heavyweight (+100 kg)	Kokoro Kageura (JPN)	Kim Sung-min (KOR)	Aliaksandr Vakhaviak (BLR)

=== Women's events ===
Event	Gold	Silver	Bronze
Extra-lightweight (−48 kg)	Daria Bilodid (UKR)	Kang Yu-jeong (KOR)	Mönkhbatyn Urantsetseg (MGL)
Extra-lightweight (−48 kg)	Daria Bilodid (UKR)	Kang Yu-jeong (KOR)	Maryna Cherniak (UKR)
Half-lightweight (−52 kg)	Uta Abe (JPN)	Amandine Buchard (FRA)	Astride Gneto (FRA)
Half-lightweight (−52 kg)	Uta Abe (JPN)	Amandine Buchard (FRA)	Distria Krasniqi (KOS)
Lightweight (−57 kg)	Christa Deguchi (CAN)	Tsukasa Yoshida (JPN)	Nekoda Smythe-Davis (GBR)
Lightweight (−57 kg)	Christa Deguchi (CAN)	Tsukasa Yoshida (JPN)	Kim Ji-su (KOR)
Half-middleweight (−63 kg)	Clarisse Agbegnenou (FRA)	Miku Tashiro (JPN)	Tina Trstenjak (SLO)
Half-middleweight (−63 kg)	Clarisse Agbegnenou (FRA)	Miku Tashiro (JPN)	Martyna Trajdos (GER)
Middleweight (−70 kg)	Sally Conway (GBR)	Chizuru Arai (JPN)	Kim Polling (NED)
Middleweight (−70 kg)	Sally Conway (GBR)	Chizuru Arai (JPN)	Marie-Ève Gahié (FRA)
Half-heavyweight (−78 kg)	Audrey Tcheuméo (FRA)	Guusje Steenhuis (NED)	Madeleine Malonga (FRA)
Half-heavyweight (−78 kg)	Audrey Tcheuméo (FRA)	Guusje Steenhuis (NED)	Shori Hamada (JPN)
Heavyweight (+78 kg)	Kim Min-jeong (KOR)	Wang Yan (CHN)	Iryna Kindzerska (AZE)
Heavyweight (+78 kg)	Kim Min-jeong (KOR)	Wang Yan (CHN)	Akira Sone (JPN)

Source Results

=== Medal table ===
* Host nation (France)

Rank	Nation	Gold	Silver	Bronze	Total
1	Japan (JPN)	5	4	3	12
2	South Korea (KOR)	2	4	2	8
3	France (FRA)*	2	1	6	9
4	Netherlands (NED)	1	1	2	4
5	Great Britain (GBR)	1	0	2	3
6	Kosovo (KOS)	1	0	1	2
6	Ukraine (UKR)	1	0	1	2
8	Canada (CAN)	1	0	0	1
9	Georgia (GEO)	0	2	2	4
10	China (CHN)	0	1	0	1
10	Uzbekistan (UZB)	0	1	0	1
12	Germany (GER)	0	0	3	3
13	Mongolia (MGL)	0	0	2	2
14	Azerbaijan (AZE)	0	0	1	1
14	Belarus (BLR)	0	0	1	1
14	Czech Republic (CZE)	0	0	1	1
14	Slovenia (SLO)	0	0	1	1
Totals (17 entries)		14	14	28	56
