= 2019 Judo World Masters =

Judo competition

Judo 2019 Judo World Masters
- Venue: Conson Gymnasium, Qingdao
- Location: Qingdao, China
- Dates: 12–14 December 2019
- Competitors: 445 from 67 nations

Competition at external databases
- Links: IJF • EJU • JudoInside

The 2019 Judo World Masters was held in Qingdao, China, from 12 to 14 December 2019.WHAT IS THIS

== Medal summary ==
=== Medal table ===
* Host nation

Rank	Nation	Gold	Silver	Bronze	Total
1	Japan (JPN)	5	2	5	12
2	Netherlands (NED)	3	1	1	5
3	France (FRA)	1	3	3	7
4	Georgia (GEO)	1	0	2	3
5	Belgium (BEL)	1	0	0	1
5	Italy (ITA)	1	0	0	1
5	Kosovo (KOS)	1	0	0	1
5	North Korea (PRK)	1	0	0	1
9	Mongolia (MGL)	0	2	1	3
10	Israel (ISR)	0	2	0	2
10	Spain (ESP)	0	2	0	2
12	Azerbaijan (AZE)	0	1	1	2
13	Czech Republic (CZE)	0	1	0	1
14	Russia (RUS)	0	0	4	4
15	Turkey (TUR)	0	0	2	2
15	Uzbekistan (UZB)	0	0	2	2
17	Belarus (BLR)	0	0	1	1
17	Canada (CAN)	0	0	1	1
17	China (CHN)*	0	0	1	1
17	Germany (GER)	0	0	1	1
17	Portugal (POR)	0	0	1	1
17	Serbia (SRB)	0	0	1	1
17	South Korea (KOR)	0	0	1	1
Totals (23 entries)		14	14	28	56

=== Men's events ===
Event	Gold	Silver	Bronze
Extra-lightweight (-60 kg)	Ryuju Nagayama; Japan	Francisco Garrigós; Spain	Robert Mshvidobadze; Russia
Extra-lightweight (-60 kg)	Ryuju Nagayama; Japan	Francisco Garrigós; Spain	Sharafuddin Lutfillaev; Uzbekistan
Half-lightweight (-66 kg)	Manuel Lombardo; Italy	Ganboldyn Kherlen; Mongolia	Baskhuu Yondonperenlei; Mongolia
Half-lightweight (-66 kg)	Manuel Lombardo; Italy	Ganboldyn Kherlen; Mongolia	Vazha Margvelashvili; Georgia
Lightweight (-73 kg)	Soichi Hashimoto; Japan	Tohar Butbul; Israel	Rustam Orujov; Azerbaijan
Lightweight (-73 kg)	Soichi Hashimoto; Japan	Tohar Butbul; Israel	Masashi Ebinuma; Japan
Half-middleweight (-81 kg)	Matthias Casse; Belgium	Sagi Muki; Israel	Alan Khubetsov; Russia
Half-middleweight (-81 kg)	Matthias Casse; Belgium	Sagi Muki; Israel	Vedat Albayrak; Turkey
Middleweight (-90 kg)	Lasha Bekauri; Georgia	Nikoloz Sherazadishvili; Spain	Mikail Özerler; Turkey
Middleweight (-90 kg)	Lasha Bekauri; Georgia	Nikoloz Sherazadishvili; Spain	Nemanja Majdov; Serbia
Half-heavyweight (-100 kg)	Michael Korrel; Netherlands	Aaron Wolf; Japan	Niyaz Ilyasov; Russia
Half-heavyweight (-100 kg)	Michael Korrel; Netherlands	Aaron Wolf; Japan	Varlam Liparteliani; Georgia
Heavyweight (+100 kg)	Hisayoshi Harasawa; Japan	Lukáš Krpálek; Czech Republic	Kokoro Kageura; Japan
Heavyweight (+100 kg)	Hisayoshi Harasawa; Japan	Lukáš Krpálek; Czech Republic	Henk Grol; Netherlands

=== Women's events ===
Event	Gold	Silver	Bronze
Extra-lightweight (-48 kg)	Distria Krasniqi; Kosovo	Narantsetseg Ganbaatar; Mongolia	Irina Dolgova; Russia
Extra-lightweight (-48 kg)	Distria Krasniqi; Kosovo	Narantsetseg Ganbaatar; Mongolia	Mélanie Clément; France
Half-lightweight (-52 kg)	Ai Shishime; Japan	Amandine Buchard; France	Diyora Keldiyorova; Uzbekistan
Half-lightweight (-52 kg)	Ai Shishime; Japan	Amandine Buchard; France	Astride Gneto; France
Lightweight (-57 kg)	Kim Jin-a; North Korea	Momo Tamaoki; Japan	Jessica Klimkait; Canada
Lightweight (-57 kg)	Kim Jin-a; North Korea	Momo Tamaoki; Japan	Telma Monteiro; Portugal
Half-middleweight (-63 kg)	Nami Nabekura; Japan	Clarisse Agbegnenou; France	Miku Tashiro; Japan
Half-middleweight (-63 kg)	Nami Nabekura; Japan	Clarisse Agbegnenou; France	Masako Doi; Japan
Middleweight (-70 kg)	Kim Polling; Netherlands	Sanne van Dijke; Netherlands	Marie-Ève Gahié; France
Middleweight (-70 kg)	Kim Polling; Netherlands	Sanne van Dijke; Netherlands	Chizuru Arai; Japan
Half-heavyweight (-78 kg)	Fanny Estelle Posvite; France	Audrey Tcheuméo; France	Chen Fei; China
Half-heavyweight (-78 kg)	Fanny Estelle Posvite; France	Audrey Tcheuméo; France	Anna-Maria Wagner; Germany
Heavyweight (+78 kg)	Tessie Savelkouls; Netherlands	Iryna Kindzerska; Azerbaijan	Maryna Slutskaya; Belarus
Heavyweight (+78 kg)	Tessie Savelkouls; Netherlands	Iryna Kindzerska; Azerbaijan	Kim Ha-yun; South Korea
