= Yoshinori Shimode =

Japanese judoka

Personal information
- Born: 27 October 1969 (age 55)
- Occupation: Judoka

Sport
- Sport: Judo

Profile at external databases
- JudoInside.com: 12214

Yoshinori Shimode (下出 善紀, Shimode Yoshinori, born 27 October 1969) is a retired Japanese judoka.

Shimode is from Uchinada, Ishikawa and began judo at the age of 1st grader.

He began working for the Asahi Kasei after graduation from Tokai University in 1992.

Shimode participated All-Japan Championships 10 times and won a bronze medal in 2000. In 2001, When he was at the age of 31, was chosen to represent Japan in the Jigoro Kano Cup and got a gold medal.

He retired in 2003.

== Achievements ==
- 1987
  - All-Japan Junior Championships (Heavyweight) 2nd
  - Inter-HighSchool Championships (Heavyweight) 1st
- 1989
  - All-Japan University Championships (Heavyweight) 1st
- 1990
  - Kodokan Cup (Heavyweight) 1st
  - All-Japan University Championships (Heavyweight) 1st
- 1991
  - Pacific Rim Championships (Heavyweight) 1st
  - All-Japan University Championships (Heavyweight) 1st
- 1992
  - Kodokan Cup (Heavyweight) 1st
- 2000
  - All-Japan Championships (Openweight only) 3rd
  - Kodokan Cup (Heavyweight) 3rd
- 2001
  - Jigoro Kano Cup (Heavyweight) 1st
