= 2021 Judo Grand Slam Tashkent =

Judo competition

Judo 2021 Judo Grand Slam Tashkent
- Venue: Humo Arena
- Location: Tashkent, Uzbekistan
- Dates: 5–7 March 2021
- Competitors: 497 from 71 nations

Competition at external databases
- Links: IJF • EJU • JudoInside

The 2021 Judo Grand Slam Tashkent was held at the Humo Ice Dome in Tashkent, Uzbekistan from 5 to 7 March 2021.

== Medal summary ==
=== Medal table ===
* Host nation (Uzbekistan)

| Rank | Nation | Gold | Silver | Bronze | Total |
|---|---|---|---|---|---|
| 1 | Japan (JPN) | 9 | 1 | 1 | 11 |
| 2 | Mongolia (MGL) | 2 | 2 | 1 | 5 |
| 3 | South Korea (KOR) | 1 | 1 | 4 | 6 |
| 4 | Belgium (BEL) | 1 | 0 | 1 | 2 |
| 5 | Italy (ITA) | 1 | 0 | 0 | 1 |
| 6 | Uzbekistan (UZB)* | 0 | 2 | 4 | 6 |
| 7 | Croatia (CRO) | 0 | 2 | 0 | 2 |
| 7 | Kazakhstan (KAZ) | 0 | 2 | 0 | 2 |
| 9 | Brazil (BRA) | 0 | 1 | 0 | 1 |
| 9 | Bulgaria (BUL) | 0 | 1 | 0 | 1 |
| 9 | Chinese Taipei (TPE) | 0 | 1 | 0 | 1 |
| 9 | Slovenia (SLO) | 0 | 1 | 0 | 1 |
| 13 | Serbia (SRB) | 0 | 0 | 3 | 3 |
| 14 | Azerbaijan (AZE) | 0 | 0 | 2 | 2 |
| 14 | Germany (GER) | 0 | 0 | 2 | 2 |
| 14 | Venezuela (VEN) | 0 | 0 | 2 | 2 |
| 17 | Armenia (ARM) | 0 | 0 | 1 | 1 |
| 17 | France (FRA) | 0 | 0 | 1 | 1 |
| 17 | Great Britain (GBR) | 0 | 0 | 1 | 1 |
| 17 | Hungary (HUN) | 0 | 0 | 1 | 1 |
| 17 | Israel (ISR) | 0 | 0 | 1 | 1 |
| 17 | Russia (RUS) | 0 | 0 | 1 | 1 |
| 17 | Switzerland (SUI) | 0 | 0 | 1 | 1 |
| 17 | Tunisia (TUN) | 0 | 0 | 1 | 1 |
| Totals (24 entries) | | 14 | 14 | 28 | 56 |

=== Men's events ===
| Event | Gold | Silver | Bronze |
|---|---|---|---|
| Extra-lightweight (−60 kg) | Ryuju Nagayama (JPN) | Yeldos Smetov (KAZ) | Luka Mkheidze (FRA) |
| Extra-lightweight (−60 kg) | Ryuju Nagayama (JPN) | Yeldos Smetov (KAZ) | Kemran Nurillaev (UZB) |
| Half-lightweight (−66 kg) | An Ba-ul (KOR) | Yondonperenlein Baskhüü (MGL) | Aram Grigoryan (RUS) |
| Half-lightweight (−66 kg) | An Ba-ul (KOR) | Yondonperenlein Baskhüü (MGL) | Sardor Nurillaev (UZB) |
| Lightweight (−73 kg) | Tsend-Ochiryn Tsogtbaatar (MGL) | Zhansay Smagulov (KAZ) | Ferdinand Karapetian (ARM) |
| Lightweight (−73 kg) | Tsend-Ochiryn Tsogtbaatar (MGL) | Zhansay Smagulov (KAZ) | Rustam Orujov (AZE) |
| Half-middleweight (−81 kg) | Christian Parlati (ITA) | Sharofiddin Boltaboev (UZB) | Sami Chouchi (BEL) |
| Half-middleweight (−81 kg) | Christian Parlati (ITA) | Sharofiddin Boltaboev (UZB) | Takanori Nagase (JPN) |
| Middleweight (−90 kg) | Kenta Nagasawa (JPN) | Davlat Bobonov (UZB) | Mammadali Mehdiyev (AZE) |
| Middleweight (−90 kg) | Kenta Nagasawa (JPN) | Davlat Bobonov (UZB) | Krisztián Tóth (HUN) |
| Half-heavyweight (−100 kg) | Toma Nikiforov (BEL) | Boris Georgiev (BUL) | Batkhuyagiin Gonchigsüren (MGL) |
| Half-heavyweight (−100 kg) | Toma Nikiforov (BEL) | Boris Georgiev (BUL) | Muzaffarbek Turoboyev (UZB) |
| Heavyweight (+100 kg) | Kokoro Kageura (JPN) | Kim Sung-min (KOR) | Erik Abramov (GER) |
| Heavyweight (+100 kg) | Kokoro Kageura (JPN) | Kim Sung-min (KOR) | Kim Min-jong (KOR) |

Source Results

=== Women's events ===
| Event | Gold | Silver | Bronze |
|---|---|---|---|
| Extra-lightweight (−48 kg) | Mönkhbatyn Urantsetseg (MGL) | Natsumi Tsunoda (JPN) | Milica Nikolić (SRB) |
| Extra-lightweight (−48 kg) | Mönkhbatyn Urantsetseg (MGL) | Natsumi Tsunoda (JPN) | Andrea Stojadinov (SRB) |
| Half-lightweight (−52 kg) | Uta Abe (JPN) | Lkhagvasürengiin Sosorbaram (MGL) | Jeong Bo-kyeong (KOR) |
| Half-lightweight (−52 kg) | Uta Abe (JPN) | Lkhagvasürengiin Sosorbaram (MGL) | Fabienne Kocher (SUI) |
| Lightweight (−57 kg) | Momo Tamaoki (JPN) | Lien Chen-ling (TPE) | Marica Perišić (SRB) |
| Lightweight (−57 kg) | Momo Tamaoki (JPN) | Lien Chen-ling (TPE) | Theresa Stoll (GER) |
| Half-middleweight (−63 kg) | Miku Takaichi (JPN) | Andreja Leški (SLO) | Anriquelis Barrios (VEN) |
| Half-middleweight (−63 kg) | Miku Takaichi (JPN) | Andreja Leški (SLO) | Amy Livesey (GBR) |
| Middleweight (−70 kg) | Chizuru Arai (JPN) | Barbara Matić (CRO) | Gulnoza Matniyazova (UZB) |
| Middleweight (−70 kg) | Chizuru Arai (JPN) | Barbara Matić (CRO) | Elvismar Rodríguez (VEN) |
| Half-heavyweight (−78 kg) | Mami Umeki (JPN) | Karla Prodan (CRO) | Inbar Lanir (ISR) |
| Half-heavyweight (−78 kg) | Mami Umeki (JPN) | Karla Prodan (CRO) | Lee Jeong-yun (KOR) |
| Heavyweight (+78 kg) | Akira Sone (JPN) | Beatriz Souza (BRA) | Nihel Cheikh Rouhou (TUN) |
| Heavyweight (+78 kg) | Akira Sone (JPN) | Beatriz Souza (BRA) | Kim Ha-yun (KOR) |

Source Results

== Event videos ==
The event was aired freely on the IJF YouTube channel.

| | Weight classes | Preliminaries | | | Final Block |
|---|---|---|---|---|---|
| Day 1 | Men: -60, -66 Women: -48, -52, -57 | Commentated | | | |
| Day 1 | Men: -60, -66 Women: -48, -52, -57 | Tatami 1 | Tatami 2 | Tatami 3 | |
| Day 2 | Men: -73, -81 Women: -63, -70 | Commentated | | | |
| Day 2 | Men: -73, -81 Women: -63, -70 | Tatami 1 | Tatami 2 | Tatami 3 | |
| Day 3 | Men: -90, -100, +100 Women: -78, +78 | Commentated | | | |
| Day 3 | Men: -90, -100, +100 Women: -78, +78 | Tatami 1 | Tatami 2 | Tatami 3 | |
