= 2017 Judo Grand Slam Tokyo =

Judo competition

Judo 2017 Judo Grand Slam Tokyo
- Venue: Tokyo Metropolitan Gymnasium, Tokyo
- Location: Tokyo, Japan
- Dates: 2–3 December 2017
- Competitors: 412 from 60 nations

Competition at external databases
- Links: IJF • EJU • JudoInside

The 2017 edition of the Judo Grand Slam Tokyo was held in Tokyo, Japan, from 2 to 3 December 2017.

== Medal summary ==
=== Men's events ===
Event	Gold	Silver	Bronze
Extra-lightweight (−60 kg)	Naohisa Takato (JPN)	Dashdavaagiin Amartüvshin (MGL)	Ryuju Nagayama (JPN)
Extra-lightweight (−60 kg)	Naohisa Takato (JPN)	Dashdavaagiin Amartüvshin (MGL)	Toru Shishime (JPN)
Half-lightweight (−66 kg)	Hifumi Abe (JPN)	Joshiro Maruyama (JPN)	An Ba-ul (KOR)
Half-lightweight (−66 kg)	Hifumi Abe (JPN)	Joshiro Maruyama (JPN)	Norihito Isoda (JPN)
Lightweight (−73 kg)	Arata Tatsukawa (JPN)	Arthur Margelidon (CAN)	Ahn Joon-sung (KOR)
Lightweight (−73 kg)	Arata Tatsukawa (JPN)	Arthur Margelidon (CAN)	Soichi Hashimoto (JPN)
Half-middleweight (−81 kg)	Otgonbaataryn Uuganbaatar (MGL)	Lee Sung-ho (KOR)	Frank de Wit (NED)
Half-middleweight (−81 kg)	Otgonbaataryn Uuganbaatar (MGL)	Lee Sung-ho (KOR)	Nyamsürengiin Dagvasüren (MGL)
Middleweight (−90 kg)	Kenta Nagasawa (JPN)	Yūsuke Kobayashi (JPN)	Ushangi Margiani (GEO)
Middleweight (−90 kg)	Kenta Nagasawa (JPN)	Yūsuke Kobayashi (JPN)	Shoichiro Mukai (JPN)
Half-heavyweight (−100 kg)	Cho Gu-ham (KOR)	Michael Korrel (NED)	Miklós Cirjenics (HUN)
Half-heavyweight (−100 kg)	Cho Gu-ham (KOR)	Michael Korrel (NED)	Toma Nikiforov (BEL)
Heavyweight (+100 kg)	Yusei Ogawa (JPN)	Lukáš Krpálek (CZE)	Kokoro Kageura (JPN)
Heavyweight (+100 kg)	Yusei Ogawa (JPN)	Lukáš Krpálek (CZE)	David Moura (BRA)

=== Women's events ===
Event	Gold	Silver	Bronze
Extra-lightweight (−48 kg)	Ami Kondo (JPN)	Mönkhbatyn Urantsetseg (MGL)	Jeong Bo-kyeong (KOR)
Extra-lightweight (−48 kg)	Ami Kondo (JPN)	Mönkhbatyn Urantsetseg (MGL)	Funa Tonaki (JPN)
Half-lightweight (−52 kg)	Uta Abe (JPN)	Rina Tatsukawa (JPN)	Amandine Buchard (FRA)
Half-lightweight (−52 kg)	Uta Abe (JPN)	Rina Tatsukawa (JPN)	Ai Shishime (JPN)
Lightweight (−57 kg)	Tsukasa Yoshida (JPN)	Anzu Yamamoto (JPN)	Momo Tamaoki (JPN)
Lightweight (−57 kg)	Tsukasa Yoshida (JPN)	Anzu Yamamoto (JPN)	Nae Udaka (JPN)
Half-middleweight (−63 kg)	Miku Tashiro (JPN)	Nami Nabekura (JPN)	Tina Trstenjak (SLO)
Half-middleweight (−63 kg)	Miku Tashiro (JPN)	Nami Nabekura (JPN)	Megumi Horikawa (JPN)
Middleweight (−70 kg)	Yoko Ono (JPN)	Chizuru Arai (JPN)	María Pérez (PUR)
Middleweight (−70 kg)	Yoko Ono (JPN)	Chizuru Arai (JPN)	Shiho Tanaka (JPN)
Half-heavyweight (−78 kg)	Shori Hamada (JPN)	Guusje Steenhuis (NED)	Ruika Sato (JPN)
Half-heavyweight (−78 kg)	Shori Hamada (JPN)	Guusje Steenhuis (NED)	Audrey Tcheuméo (FRA)
Heavyweight (+78 kg)	Sarah Asahina (JPN)	Akira Sone (JPN)	Maria Suelen Altheman (BRA)
Heavyweight (+78 kg)	Sarah Asahina (JPN)	Akira Sone (JPN)	Kim Min-jeong (KOR)

Source Results

=== Medal table ===
* Host nation (Japan)

Rank	Nation	Gold	Silver	Bronze	Total
1	Japan (JPN)*	12	7	13	32
2	Mongolia (MGL)	1	2	1	4
3	South Korea (KOR)	1	1	4	6
4	Netherlands (NED)	0	2	1	3
5	Canada (CAN)	0	1	0	1
5	Czech Republic (CZE)	0	1	0	1
7	Brazil (BRA)	0	0	2	2
7	France (FRA)	0	0	2	2
9	Belgium (BEL)	0	0	1	1
9	Georgia (GEO)	0	0	1	1
9	Hungary (HUN)	0	0	1	1
9	Puerto Rico (PUR)	0	0	1	1
9	Slovenia (SLO)	0	0	1	1
Totals (13 entries)		14	14	28	56
