= Miho Minei =

Japanese judoka (born 1997)

Personal information
- Nationality: Japanese
- Born: 16 September 1997 (age 28)
- Occupation: Judoka

Sport
- Country: Japan
- Sport: Judo
- Weight class: ‍–‍63 kg
Medal record
Women's judo
Representing Japan
IJF Grand Slam
Silver medal – second place	2016 Tokyo	‍–‍63 kg
IJF Grand Prix
Silver medal – second place	2015 Ulaanbaatar	‍–‍63 kg
World Juniors Championships
Gold medal – first place	2014 Fort Lauderdale	‍–‍63 kg
Asian Cadet Championships
Gold medal – first place	2012 Taipei	‍–‍63 kg

Profile at external databases
- IJF: 17391
- JudoInside.com: 86404
- Updated on 25 November 2022

Miho Minei (born 16 September 1997) is a Japanese judoka.

Minei is the silver medalist from the 2016 Judo Grand Slam Tokyo in the ‍–‍63 kg category.
