= 2018 Judo Grand Slam Ekaterinburg =

Judo competition

Judo 2018 Judo Grand Slam Ekaterinburg
- Venue: Palace of Sports, Ekaterinburg
- Location: Ekaterinburg, Russia
- Dates: 17–18 March 2018
- Competitors: 251 from 34 nations

Competition at external databases
- Links: IJF • EJU • JudoInside

The 2018 Judo Grand Slam was held in Ekaterinburg, Russia, from 17 to 18 March 2018.

== Medal summary ==
=== Men's events ===
Event	Gold	Silver	Bronze
Extra-lightweight (−60 kg)	Yeldos Smetov (KAZ)	Islam Yashuev (RUS)	Yuma Oshima (JPN)
Extra-lightweight (−60 kg)	Yeldos Smetov (KAZ)	Islam Yashuev (RUS)	Beslan Mudranov (RUS)
Half-lightweight (−66 kg)	Hifumi Abe (JPN)	Yakub Shamilov (RUS)	Dzmitry Minkou (BLR)
Half-lightweight (−66 kg)	Hifumi Abe (JPN)	Yakub Shamilov (RUS)	Abdula Abdulzhalilov (RUS)
Lightweight (−73 kg)	Tsend-Ochiryn Tsogtbaatar (MGL)	Ferdinand Karapetian (ARM)	Fabio Basile (ITA)
Lightweight (−73 kg)	Tsend-Ochiryn Tsogtbaatar (MGL)	Ferdinand Karapetian (ARM)	Uali Kurzhev (RUS)
Half-middleweight (−81 kg)	Sotaro Fujiwara (JPN)	Takeshi Sasaki (JPN)	Saeid Mollaei (IRI)
Half-middleweight (−81 kg)	Sotaro Fujiwara (JPN)	Takeshi Sasaki (JPN)	Zebeda Rekhviashvili (GEO)
Middleweight (−90 kg)	Aleksandar Kukolj (SRB)	Yahor Varapayeu (BLR)	Gantulgyn Altanbagana (MGL)
Middleweight (−90 kg)	Aleksandar Kukolj (SRB)	Yahor Varapayeu (BLR)	Nicholas Mungai (ITA)
Half-heavyweight (−100 kg)	Niyaz Ilyasov (RUS)	Toma Nikiforov (BEL)	Laurin Boehler (AUT)
Half-heavyweight (−100 kg)	Niyaz Ilyasov (RUS)	Toma Nikiforov (BEL)	Daniel Mukete (BLR)
Heavyweight (+100 kg)	Hyōga Ōta (JPN)	Henk Grol (NED)	Tamerlan Bashaev (RUS)
Heavyweight (+100 kg)	Hyōga Ōta (JPN)	Henk Grol (NED)	Rafael Silva (BRA)

=== Women's events ===
Event	Gold	Silver	Bronze
Extra-lightweight (−48 kg)	Hiromi Endō (JPN)	Paula Pareto (ARG)	Katharina Menz (GER)
Extra-lightweight (−48 kg)	Hiromi Endō (JPN)	Paula Pareto (ARG)	Ganbaataryn Narantsetseg (MGL)
Half-lightweight (−52 kg)	Natalia Kuziutina (RUS)	Érika Miranda (BRA)	Rina Tatsukawa (JPN)
Half-lightweight (−52 kg)	Natalia Kuziutina (RUS)	Érika Miranda (BRA)	Jéssica Pereira (BRA)
Lightweight (−57 kg)	Telma Monteiro (POR)	Lien Chen-ling (TPE)	Dorjsürengiin Sumiyaa (MGL)
Lightweight (−57 kg)	Telma Monteiro (POR)	Lien Chen-ling (TPE)	Momo Tamaoki (JPN)
Half-middleweight (−63 kg)	Aimi Nouchi (JPN)	Juul Franssen (NED)	Maelle Di Cintio (FRA)
Half-middleweight (−63 kg)	Aimi Nouchi (JPN)	Juul Franssen (NED)	Edwige Gwend (ITA)
Middleweight (−70 kg)	Maria Portela (BRA)	Taisia Kireeva (RUS)	Barbara Matić (CRO)
Middleweight (−70 kg)	Maria Portela (BRA)	Taisia Kireeva (RUS)	Bárbara Timo (BRA)
Half-heavyweight (−78 kg)	Rika Takayama (JPN)	Luise Malzahn (GER)	Mayra Aguiar (BRA)
Half-heavyweight (−78 kg)	Rika Takayama (JPN)	Luise Malzahn (GER)	Anna-Maria Wagner (GER)
Heavyweight (+78 kg)	Larisa Cerić (BIH)	Maria Suelen Altheman (BRA)	Beatriz Souza (BRA)
Heavyweight (+78 kg)	Larisa Cerić (BIH)	Maria Suelen Altheman (BRA)	Carolin Weiß (GER)

Source Results

=== Medal table ===
* Host nation (Russia)

Rank	Nation	Gold	Silver	Bronze	Total
1	Japan (JPN)	6	1	3	10
2	Russia (RUS)*	2	3	4	9
3	Brazil (BRA)	1	2	5	8
4	Mongolia (MGL)	1	0	3	4
5	Bosnia and Herzegovina (BIH)	1	0	0	1
5	Kazakhstan (KAZ)	1	0	0	1
5	Portugal (POR)	1	0	0	1
5	Serbia (SRB)	1	0	0	1
9	Netherlands (NED)	0	2	0	2
10	Germany (GER)	0	1	3	4
11	Belarus (BLR)	0	1	2	3
12	Argentina (ARG)	0	1	0	1
12	Armenia (ARM)	0	1	0	1
12	Belgium (BEL)	0	1	0	1
12	Chinese Taipei (TPE)	0	1	0	1
16	Italy (ITA)	0	0	3	3
17	Austria (AUT)	0	0	1	1
17	Croatia (CRO)	0	0	1	1
17	France (FRA)	0	0	1	1
17	Georgia (GEO)	0	0	1	1
17	Iran (IRI)	0	0	1	1
Totals (21 entries)		14	14	28	56
