= Arata Tatsukawa =

Japanese judoka (born 1997)

Personal information
- Born: 30 November 1997 (age 28)
- Occupation: Judoka

Sport
- Country: Japan
- Sport: Judo
- Weight class: ‍–‍73 kg

Achievements and titles
- Asian Champ.: (bronze) (2017)
Medal record
Men's judo
Representing Japan
World Championships
Gold medal – first place	2018 Baku	Mixed team
Asian Championships
Bronze medal – third place	2017 Hong Kong	‍–‍73 kg
IJF Grand Slam
Gold medal – first place	2017 Tokyo	‍–‍73 kg
Bronze medal – third place	2016 Tokyo	‍–‍73 kg
Bronze medal – third place	2018 Osaka	‍–‍73 kg
Asian Junior Championships
Bronze medal – third place	2014 Hong Kong	‍–‍73 kg
Summer Universiade
Gold medal – first place	2017 Taipei	‍–‍73 kg

Profile at external databases
- IJF: 13209
- JudoInside.com: 22366
- Updated on 25 November 2022

Arata Tatsukawa (立川 新, Tatsukawa Arata; born 30 November 1997) is a Japanese judoka.

Tatsukawa participated at the 2018 World Judo Championships, winning a medal.
