= Yuji Aida =

Japanese judoka

Personal information
- Nationality: Japanese
- Born: 4 July 1999 (age 26)
- Occupation: Judoka

Sport
- Country: Japan
- Sport: Judo
- Weight class: –66 kg
Medal record
Men's judo
Representing Japan
IJF Grand Slam
| Bronze medal – third place | 2019 Osaka | –66 kg |
IJF Grand Prix
| Silver medal – second place | 2019 Tashkent | –66 kg |
World Juniors Championships
| Bronze medal – third place | 2018 Nassau | –66 kg |

Profile at external databases
- IJF: 48736
- JudoInside.com: 128833
- Updated on 21 November 2022

Yuji Aida (born 4 July 1999) is a Japanese judoka.

He is the bronze medallist of the 2019 Judo Grand Slam Osaka in the -66 kg category.
