= 2016 Judo Grand Slam Tokyo =

Judo competition

Judo 2016 Judo Grand Slam Tokyo
- Venue: Tokyo Metropolitan Gymnasium, Tokyo
- Location: Tokyo, Japan
- Dates: 2–4 December 2016
- Competitors: 286 from 41 nations

Competition at external databases
- Links: IJF • EJU • JudoInside

The 2016 edition of the Judo Grand Slam Tokyo was held in Tokyo, Japan, from 2 to 4 December 2016.

== Medal summary ==
=== Men's events ===
Event	Gold	Silver	Bronze
Extra-lightweight (−60 kg)	Ryuju Nagayama (JPN)	Naohisa Takato (JPN)	Choi In-hyuk (KOR)
Extra-lightweight (−60 kg)	Ryuju Nagayama (JPN)	Naohisa Takato (JPN)	Robert Mshvidobadze (RUS)
Half-lightweight (−66 kg)	Hifumi Abe (JPN)	Yuuki Hashiguchi (JPN)	Dovdony Altansükh (MGL)
Half-lightweight (−66 kg)	Hifumi Abe (JPN)	Yuuki Hashiguchi (JPN)	Mikhail Pulyaev (RUS)
Lightweight (−73 kg)	Soichi Hashimoto (JPN)	Takeshi Doi (JPN)	Giyosjon Boboev (UZB)
Lightweight (−73 kg)	Soichi Hashimoto (JPN)	Takeshi Doi (JPN)	Arata Tatsukawa (JPN)
Half-middleweight (−81 kg)	Takanori Nagase (JPN)	Dominic Ressel (GER)	Ivaylo Ivanov (BUL)
Half-middleweight (−81 kg)	Takanori Nagase (JPN)	Dominic Ressel (GER)	Aslan Lappinagov (RUS)
Middleweight (−90 kg)	Aleksandar Kukolj (SRB)	Axel Clerget (FRA)	Kenta Nagasawa (JPN)
Middleweight (−90 kg)	Aleksandar Kukolj (SRB)	Axel Clerget (FRA)	Daiki Nishiyama (JPN)
Half-heavyweight (−100 kg)	Kirill Denisov (RUS)	Cyrille Maret (FRA)	Shohei Shimowada (JPN)
Half-heavyweight (−100 kg)	Kirill Denisov (RUS)	Cyrille Maret (FRA)	Kentaro Iida (JPN)
Heavyweight (+100 kg)	Takeshi Ōjitani (JPN)	Kokoro Kageura (JPN)	Hyōga Ōta (JPN)
Heavyweight (+100 kg)	Takeshi Ōjitani (JPN)	Kokoro Kageura (JPN)	Ryu Shichinohe (JPN)

=== Women's events ===
Event	Gold	Silver	Bronze
Extra-lightweight (−48 kg)	Mönkhbatyn Urantsetseg (MGL)	Jeong Bo-kyeong (KOR)	Ami Kondo (JPN)
Extra-lightweight (−48 kg)	Mönkhbatyn Urantsetseg (MGL)	Jeong Bo-kyeong (KOR)	Funa Tonaki (JPN)
Half-lightweight (−52 kg)	Natsumi Tsunoda (JPN)	Uta Abe (JPN)	Ai Shishime (JPN)
Half-lightweight (−52 kg)	Natsumi Tsunoda (JPN)	Uta Abe (JPN)	Rina Tatsukawa (JPN)
Lightweight (−57 kg)	Tsukasa Yoshida (JPN)	Nae Udaka (JPN)	Dorjsürengiin Sumiyaa (MGL)
Lightweight (−57 kg)	Tsukasa Yoshida (JPN)	Nae Udaka (JPN)	Momo Tamaoki (JPN)
Half-middleweight (−63 kg)	Kathrin Unterwurzacher (AUT)	Miho Minei (JPN)	Margaux Pinot (FRA)
Half-middleweight (−63 kg)	Kathrin Unterwurzacher (AUT)	Miho Minei (JPN)	Tina Trstenjak (SLO)
Middleweight (−70 kg)	Saki Niizoe (JPN)	Chizuru Arai (JPN)	Naeko Maeda (JPN)
Middleweight (−70 kg)	Saki Niizoe (JPN)	Chizuru Arai (JPN)	Elvismar Rodríguez (VEN)
Half-heavyweight (−78 kg)	Ruika Sato (JPN)	Park Yu-jin (KOR)	Rika Takayama (JPN)
Half-heavyweight (−78 kg)	Ruika Sato (JPN)	Park Yu-jin (KOR)	Mami Umeki (JPN)
Heavyweight (+78 kg)	Sarah Asahina (JPN)	Akira Sone (JPN)	Su Xin (CHN)
Heavyweight (+78 kg)	Sarah Asahina (JPN)	Akira Sone (JPN)	Kanae Yamabe (JPN)

Source Results

=== Medal table ===
* Host nation (Japan)

Rank	Nation	Gold	Silver	Bronze	Total
1	Japan (JPN)*	10	9	16	35
2	Russia (RUS)	1	0	3	4
3	Mongolia (MGL)	1	0	2	3
4	Austria (AUT)	1	0	0	1
4	Serbia (SRB)	1	0	0	1
6	France (FRA)	0	2	1	3
6	South Korea (KOR)	0	2	1	3
8	Germany (GER)	0	1	0	1
9	Bulgaria (BUL)	0	0	1	1
9	China (CHN)	0	0	1	1
9	Slovenia (SLO)	0	0	1	1
9	Uzbekistan (UZB)	0	0	1	1
9	Venezuela (VEN)	0	0	1	1
Totals (13 entries)		14	14	28	56
