= Judo at the 2017 Summer Universiade =

Judo competition

Judo Judo at the 2017 Summer Universiade
- Venue: Hsinchu County Stadium
- Location: (Chinese Taipei) Zhubei, Hsinchu County, Taiwan
- Dates: 20–24 August 2017
- Competitors: 189 from 30 nations

Medalists
gold medal	Japan (8th title)
silver medal	South Korea
bronze medal	Brazil

Champions
- Men's team: Japan (7th title)
- Women's team: Japan (6th title)

Competition at external databases
- Links: IJF • EJU • JudoInside

Judo was contested at the 2017 Summer Universiade at the Hsinchu County Stadium in Zhubei, Hsinchu County, Taiwan from 20 to 24 August 2017.

== Medal summary ==
=== Medal table ===
Rank	Nation	Gold	Silver	Bronze	Total
1	Japan	10	2	4	16
2	South Korea	4	5	4	13
3	Brazil	1	2	4	7
4	France	1	2	2	5
5	Italy	1	0	2	3
6	Azerbaijan	1	0	1	2
7	Russia	0	3	9	12
8	Lithuania	0	1	1	2
9	Algeria	0	1	0	1
9	Estonia	0	1	0	1
9	Mongolia	0	1	0	1
12	Germany	0	0	5	5
13	Kazakhstan	0	0	3	3
14	Ukraine	0	0	1	1
Totals (14 entries)		18	18	36	72

=== Men's events ===
Event	Gold	Silver	Bronze
Bantamweight –60 kg	Taikoh Fujisaka; Japan	Vincent Limare; France	Albert Oguzov; Russia
Bantamweight –60 kg	Taikoh Fujisaka; Japan	Vincent Limare; France	Rustam Ibrayev; Kazakhstan
Featherweight –66 kg	An Baul; South Korea	Battogtokhyn Erkhembayar; Mongolia	Abdula Abdulzhalilov; Russia
Featherweight –66 kg	An Baul; South Korea	Battogtokhyn Erkhembayar; Mongolia	Norihito Isoda; Japan
Lightweight –73 kg	Arata Tatsukawa; Japan	Florent Urani; France	Bekadil Shaimerdenov; Kazakhstan
Lightweight –73 kg	Arata Tatsukawa; Japan	Florent Urani; France	Kang Heon-cheol; South Korea
Welterweight –81 kg	Lee Seung-soo; South Korea	Aslan Lappinagov; Russia	Robin Gutsche; Germany
Welterweight –81 kg	Lee Seung-soo; South Korea	Aslan Lappinagov; Russia	Vinicius Panini; Brazil
Middleweight –90 kg	Gwak Dong-han; South Korea	Stanislav Retinskii; Russia	Firudin Dadashov; Azerbaijan
Middleweight –90 kg	Gwak Dong-han; South Korea	Stanislav Retinskii; Russia	Shoichiro Mukai; Japan
Light heavyweight –100 kg	Zelym Kotsoiev; Azerbaijan	Kentaro Iida; Japan	Philipp Galandi; Germany
Light heavyweight –100 kg	Zelym Kotsoiev; Azerbaijan	Kentaro Iida; Japan	Niiaz Bilalov; Russia
Heavyweight +100 kg	Kokoro Kageura; Japan	Ju Young-seo; South Korea	Anton Brachev; Russia
Heavyweight +100 kg	Kokoro Kageura; Japan	Ju Young-seo; South Korea	Andrii Kolesnik; Ukraine
Open weight	Hyoga Ota; Japan	Juhan Mettis; Estonia	Ruan Isquierdo; Brazil
Open weight	Hyoga Ota; Japan	Juhan Mettis; Estonia	Musa Tumenov; Russia
Team	Japan (JPN); Taikoh Fujisaka; Norihito Isoda; Arata Tatsukawa; Sotaro Fujiwara; Shoichiro Mukai; Kentaro Iida; Kokoro Kageura; Hyoga Ota	Russia (RUS); Albert Oguzov; Abdula Abdulzhalilov; Lechi Ediev; Aslan Lappinagov; Stanislav Retinskii; Niiaz Bilalov; Anton Brachev; Musa Tumenov	Germany (GER); Joerg Onufriev; Manuel Scheibel; Martin Setz; Robin Gutsche; Maximilian Schubert; Philipp Galandi; Benjamin Bachir Bouizgarne
Team	Japan (JPN); Taikoh Fujisaka; Norihito Isoda; Arata Tatsukawa; Sotaro Fujiwara; Shoichiro Mukai; Kentaro Iida; Kokoro Kageura; Hyoga Ota	Russia (RUS); Albert Oguzov; Abdula Abdulzhalilov; Lechi Ediev; Aslan Lappinagov; Stanislav Retinskii; Niiaz Bilalov; Anton Brachev; Musa Tumenov	Brazil (BRA); Allan Kuwabara; Marcelo Fuzita; Lincoln Kanemoto; Vinicius Panini; Gustavo Assis; Gabriel Gouveia; Ruan Isquierdo

=== Women's events ===
Event	Gold	Silver	Bronze
Bantamweight –48 kg	Mai Umekita; Japan	Gabriela Chibana; Brazil	Galbadrakhyn Otgontsetseg; Kazakhstan
Bantamweight –48 kg	Mai Umekita; Japan	Gabriela Chibana; Brazil	Jeong Bo-kyeong; South Korea
Featherweight –52 kg	Rina Tatsukawa; Japan	Eleudis Valentim; Brazil	Giulia Pierucci; Italy
Featherweight –52 kg	Rina Tatsukawa; Japan	Eleudis Valentim; Brazil	Park Da-sol; South Korea
Lightweight –57 kg	Lola Benarroche; France	Kwon You-jeong; South Korea	Yui Murai; Japan
Lightweight –57 kg	Lola Benarroche; France	Kwon You-jeong; South Korea	Tamires Crude; Brazil
Welterweight –63 kg	Aimi Nouchi; Japan	Amina Belkadi; Algeria	Valentina Kostenko; Russia
Welterweight –63 kg	Aimi Nouchi; Japan	Amina Belkadi; Algeria	Nadja Bazynski; Germany
Middleweight –70 kg	Bárbara Timo; Brazil	Saki Niizoe; Japan	Kim Seong-yeon; South Korea
Middleweight –70 kg	Bárbara Timo; Brazil	Saki Niizoe; Japan	Carola Paissoni; Italy
Light heavyweight –78 kg	Valeria Ferrari; Italy	Lee Jeong-yun; South Korea	Maike Ziech; Germany
Light heavyweight –78 kg	Valeria Ferrari; Italy	Lee Jeong-yun; South Korea	Aleksandra Babintseva; Russia
Heavyweight +78 kg	Han Mi-jin; South Korea	Santa Pakenytė; Lithuania	Anne-Fatoumata Mbairo; France
Heavyweight +78 kg	Han Mi-jin; South Korea	Santa Pakenytė; Lithuania	Maiko Inoue; Japan
Open weight	Akari Inoue; Japan	Kim Ji-youn; South Korea	Santa Pakenytė; Lithuania
Open weight	Akari Inoue; Japan	Kim Ji-youn; South Korea	Anzhela Gasparian; Russia
Team	Japan (JPN); Mai Umekita; Rina Tatsukawa; Yui Murai; Aimi Nouchi; Saki Niizoe; Mao Izumi; Maiko Inoue; Akari Inoue	South Korea (KOR); Jeong Bo-kyeong; Park Da-sol; Kwon You-jeong; Choi Eun-sol; Kim Seong-yeon; Lee Jeong-yun; Han Mi-jin; Kim Ji-youn	Russia (RUS); Mariia Persidskaia; Galiya Sagitova; Natalia Golomidova; Valentina Kostenko; Tatiana Kovalenko; Aleksandra Babintseva; Anzhela Gasparian; Iuliia Lianichenko
Team	Japan (JPN); Mai Umekita; Rina Tatsukawa; Yui Murai; Aimi Nouchi; Saki Niizoe; Mao Izumi; Maiko Inoue; Akari Inoue	South Korea (KOR); Jeong Bo-kyeong; Park Da-sol; Kwon You-jeong; Choi Eun-sol; Kim Seong-yeon; Lee Jeong-yun; Han Mi-jin; Kim Ji-youn	France (FRA); Marine L'Henry; Laura Holtzinger; Lola Benarroche; Caroline Peschaud; Lucie Perrot; Madeleine Malonga; Anne-Fatoumata Mbairo
