= Shoichiro Mukai =

Japanese judoka (born 1996)

Personal information
- Nationality: Japanese
- Born: 10 February 1996 (age 30) Takaoka, Japan
- Occupation: Judoka
- Website: shoichiro-mukai.com

Sport
- Country: Japan
- Sport: Judo
- Weight class: –90 kg

Achievements and titles
- Olympic Games: R16 (2020)
- World Champ.: (silver) (2019)
- Asian Champ.: (silver) (2021)
Medal record
Men's judo
Representing Japan
Olympic Games
Silver medal – second place	2020 Tokyo	Mixed team
World Championships
Silver medal – second place	2019 Tokyo	‍–‍90 kg
Asian Championships
Silver medal – second place	2021 Bishkek	‍–‍90 kg
Bronze medal – third place	2017 Hong Kong	‍–‍90 kg
IJF Grand Slam
Gold medal – first place	2018 Paris	‍–‍90 kg
Gold medal – first place	2018 Osaka	‍–‍90 kg
Bronze medal – third place	2017 Tokyo	‍–‍90 kg
Bronze medal – third place	2019 Osaka	‍–‍90 kg
Bronze medal – third place	2020 Düsseldorf	‍–‍90 kg
Bronze medal – third place	2022 Tbilisi	‍–‍90 kg
IJF Grand Prix
Silver medal – second place	2019 Budapest	‍–‍90 kg
Summer Universiade
Bronze medal – third place	2017 Taipei	‍–‍90 kg

Profile at external databases
- IJF: 17385
- JudoInside.com: 92558
- Updated on 23 May 2023

Shoichiro Mukai (向 翔一郎, Mukai Shōichirō; born 10 February 1996) is a Japanese judoka. He won a silver medal in mixed team, at the 2020 Olympics held in Tokyo, Japan.

== Career ==
He participated at the 2019 World Judo Championships, winning a medal.
