= 2022 Asian Judo Championships =

Judo competition

2022 Judo Asian Judo Championships
- Venue: Zhaksylyk Ushkempirov Martial Art Palace
- Location: Nur-Sultan, Kazakhstan
- Dates: 4–7 August 2022
- Competitors: 168 from 17 nations

Competition at external databases
- Links: IJF • JudoInside

The 2022 Asian Judo Championships was held from 4 to 7 August 2022 at the "Zhaksylyk Ushkempirov Martial Art Palace" in Nur-Sultan, Kazakhstan. The last day of competition featured a mixed team event.

== Medal summary ==
=== Men ===
Event	Gold	Silver	Bronze
Extra lightweight −60 kg	Ryuju Nagayama; Japan	Kim Won-jin; South Korea	Magzhan Shamshadin; Kazakhstan
Extra lightweight −60 kg	Ryuju Nagayama; Japan	Kim Won-jin; South Korea	Yang Yung-wei; Chinese Taipei
Half lightweight −66 kg	Yondonperenlein Baskhüü; Mongolia	Ryoma Tanaka; Japan	Gusman Kyrgyzbayev; Kazakhstan
Half lightweight −66 kg	Yondonperenlein Baskhüü; Mongolia	Ryoma Tanaka; Japan	Mukhriddin Tilovov; Uzbekistan
Lightweight −73 kg	Daniyar Shamshayev; Kazakhstan	Murodjon Yuldoshev; Uzbekistan	Obidkhon Nomonov; Uzbekistan
Lightweight −73 kg	Daniyar Shamshayev; Kazakhstan	Murodjon Yuldoshev; Uzbekistan	Chyngyzkhan Sagynaliev; Kyrgyzstan
Half middleweight −81 kg	Takeshi Sasaki; Japan	Shodmon Rizoev; Tajikistan	Somon Makhmadbekov; Tajikistan
Half middleweight −81 kg	Takeshi Sasaki; Japan	Shodmon Rizoev; Tajikistan	Nugzar Tatalashvili; United Arab Emirates
Middleweight −90 kg	Sanshiro Murao; Japan	Erlan Sherov; Kyrgyzstan	Didar Khamza; Kazakhstan
Middleweight −90 kg	Sanshiro Murao; Japan	Erlan Sherov; Kyrgyzstan	Gantulgyn Altanbagana; Mongolia
Half heavyweight −100 kg	Dzhafar Kostoev; United Arab Emirates	Islam Bozbayev; Kazakhstan	Batkhuyagiin Gonchigsüren; Mongolia
Half heavyweight −100 kg	Dzhafar Kostoev; United Arab Emirates	Islam Bozbayev; Kazakhstan	Nurlykhan Sharkhan; Kazakhstan
Heavyweight +100 kg	Kokoro Kageura; Japan	Temur Rakhimov; Tajikistan	Bekmurod Oltiboev; Uzbekistan
Heavyweight +100 kg	Kokoro Kageura; Japan	Temur Rakhimov; Tajikistan	Shokhrukhkhon Bakhtiyorov; Uzbekistan

=== Women ===
Event	Gold	Silver	Bronze
Extra lightweight −48 kg	Wakana Koga; Japan	Abiba Abuzhakynova; Kazakhstan	Lee Hye-kyeong; South Korea
Extra lightweight −48 kg	Wakana Koga; Japan	Abiba Abuzhakynova; Kazakhstan	Ganbaataryn Narantsetseg; Mongolia
Half lightweight −52 kg	Diyora Keldiyorova; Uzbekistan	Ai Shishime; Japan	Jung Ye-rin; South Korea
Half lightweight −52 kg	Diyora Keldiyorova; Uzbekistan	Ai Shishime; Japan	Bishreltiin Khorloodoi; Mongolia
Lightweight −57 kg	Momo Tamaoki; Japan	Cai Qi; China	Lien Chen-ling; Chinese Taipei
Lightweight −57 kg	Momo Tamaoki; Japan	Cai Qi; China	Nilufar Ermaganbetova; Uzbekistan
Half middleweight −63 kg	Boldyn Gankhaich; Mongolia	Nami Nabekura; Japan	Kim Ji-jeong; South Korea
Half middleweight −63 kg	Boldyn Gankhaich; Mongolia	Nami Nabekura; Japan	Tang Jing; China
Middleweight −70 kg	Yoko Ono; Japan	Gulnoza Matniyazova; Uzbekistan	Tserendulamyn Enkhchimeg; Mongolia
Middleweight −70 kg	Yoko Ono; Japan	Gulnoza Matniyazova; Uzbekistan	Shokhista Nazarova; Uzbekistan
Half heavyweight −78 kg	Mami Umeki; Japan	Lee Jeong-yun; South Korea	Ma Zhenzhao; China
Half heavyweight −78 kg	Mami Umeki; Japan	Lee Jeong-yun; South Korea	Aruna Jangeldina; Kazakhstan
Heavyweight +78 kg	Akira Sone; Japan	Xu Shiyan; China	Su Xin; China
Heavyweight +78 kg	Akira Sone; Japan	Xu Shiyan; China	Kim Ha-yun; South Korea

=== Mixed ===
Event	Gold	Silver	Bronze
Team	Japan	Mongolia	Kazakhstan
Team	Japan	Mongolia	China

== Medal table ==
Rank	Nation	Gold	Silver	Bronze	Total
1	Japan	10	3	0	13
2	Mongolia	2	1	5	8
3	Kazakhstan	1	2	6	9
3	Uzbekistan	1	2	6	9
5	United Arab Emirates	1	0	1	2
6	China	0	2	4	6
6	South Korea	0	2	4	6
8	Tajikistan	0	2	1	3
9	Kyrgyzstan	0	1	1	2
10	Chinese Taipei	0	0	2	2
Totals (10 entries)		15	15	30	60
