= Mami Umeki =

Japanese judoka (born 1994)

Personal information
- Native name: 梅木 真美
- Nationality: Japanese
- Born: 6 December 1994 (age 31) Oita, Japan
- Occupation: Judoka
- Height: 1.74 m (5 ft 9 in)

Sport
- Country: Japan
- Sport: Judo
- Weight class: ‍–‍78 kg

Achievements and titles
- Olympic Games: R16 (2016)
- World Champ.: (2015)
- Asian Champ.: (gold) (2015, 2022)
Medal record
Women's judo
Representing Japan
World Championships
Gold medal – first place	2015 Astana	‍–‍78 kg
Silver medal – second place	2017 Budapest	‍–‍78 kg
Bronze medal – third place	2021 Budapest	‍–‍78 kg
Asian Games
Gold medal – first place	2014 Incheon	Women's team
Bronze medal – third place	2014 Incheon	‍–‍78 kg
Asian Championships
Gold medal – first place	2015 Kuwait City	‍–‍78 kg
Gold medal – first place	2022 Nur‑Sultan	‍–‍78 kg
World Masters
Gold medal – first place	2018 Guangzhou	‍–‍78 kg
IJF Grand Slam
Gold medal – first place	2017 Ekaterinburg	‍–‍78 kg
Gold medal – first place	2019 Osaka	‍–‍78 kg
Gold medal – first place	2021 Tashkent	‍–‍78 kg
Gold medal – first place	2022 Ulaanbaatar	‍–‍78 kg
Silver medal – second place	2018 Osaka	‍–‍78 kg
Silver medal – second place	2022 Paris	‍–‍78 kg
Silver medal – second place	2023 Ulaanbaatar	‍–‍78 kg
Silver medal – second place	2025 Ulaanbaatar	‍–‍78 kg
Bronze medal – third place	2016 Baku	‍–‍78 kg
Bronze medal – third place	2016 Tokyo	‍–‍78 kg
Bronze medal – third place	2019 Paris	‍–‍78 kg
Bronze medal – third place	2020 Paris	‍–‍78 kg
Bronze medal – third place	2022 Tokyo	‍–‍78 kg
Bronze medal – third place	2023 Tel Aviv	‍–‍78 kg
Bronze medal – third place	2023 Baku	‍–‍78 kg
Bronze medal – third place	2024 Tokyo	‍–‍78 kg
Bronze medal – third place	2025 Baku	‍–‍78 kg
Bronze medal – third place	2025 Tokyo	‍–‍78 kg
Bronze medal – third place	2026 Tashkent	‍–‍78 kg
IJF Grand Prix
Gold medal – first place	2017 Düsseldorf	‍–‍78 kg
Gold medal – first place	2018 Budapest	‍–‍78 kg
Gold medal – first place	2019 Zagreb	‍–‍78 kg
Bronze medal – third place	2014 Qingdao	‍–‍78 kg
World Juniors Championships
Gold medal – first place	2011 Cape Town	‍–‍78 kg
Asian Junior Championships
Gold medal – first place	2012 Taipei	‍–‍78 kg
Summer Universiade
Bronze medal – third place	2013 Kazan	‍–‍78 kg

Profile at external databases
- IJF: 9383
- JudoInside.com: 72552
- Updated on 3 March 2026

Mami Umeki (梅木 真美, Umeki Mami; born 6 December 1994) is a female Japanese judoka.

Umeki started judo at the age of 9. Her favorite techniques are Osoto Gari and Sankaku Jime.

Umeki won the gold medal in the ‍–‍78 kg weight class at the 2011 World Judo Juniors Championships in Cape Town.

In 2015, Umeki won the gold medal in the Half-heavyweight division (‍–‍78 kg) at the 2015 World Judo Championships, at the age of 20.

In 2021, Umeki won the gold medal in her event at the 2021 Judo Grand Slam Tashkent held in Tashkent, Uzbekistan.

Umeki won the silver medal in her event at the 2022 Judo Grand Slam Paris held in Paris, France.
