= 2020 Judo Grand Slam Paris =

Judo competition

Judo 2020 Judo Grand Slam Paris
- Venue: Accor Arena
- Location: Paris, France
- Dates: 8–9 February 2020
- Competitors: 680 from 115 nations

Competition at external databases
- Links: IJF • EJU • JudoInside

The 2020 Judo Grand Slam Paris was held in Paris, France from 8 to 9 February 2020. The Chinese delegation could not participate because of visa issues due to the COVID-19 pandemic.

== Medal summary ==
=== Men's events ===
Event	Gold	Silver	Bronze
Extra-lightweight (−60 kg)	Ryuju Nagayama (JPN)	Yago Abuladze (RUS)	Yeldos Smetov (KAZ)
Extra-lightweight (−60 kg)	Ryuju Nagayama (JPN)	Yago Abuladze (RUS)	Dashdavaagiin Amartüvshin (MGL)
Half-lightweight (−66 kg)	An Ba-ul (KOR)	Kim Lim-hwan (KOR)	Georgii Zantaraia (UKR)
Half-lightweight (−66 kg)	An Ba-ul (KOR)	Kim Lim-hwan (KOR)	Yondonperenlein Baskhüü (MGL)
Lightweight (−73 kg)	Soichi Hashimoto (JPN)	Zhansay Smagulov (KAZ)	Tsend-Ochiryn Tsogtbaatar (MGL)
Lightweight (−73 kg)	Soichi Hashimoto (JPN)	Zhansay Smagulov (KAZ)	Khikmatillokh Turaev (UZB)
Half-middleweight (−81 kg)	Matthias Casse (BEL)	Sharofiddin Boltaboev (UZB)	Sotaro Fujiwara (JPN)
Half-middleweight (−81 kg)	Matthias Casse (BEL)	Sharofiddin Boltaboev (UZB)	Antoine Valois-Fortier (CAN)
Middleweight (−90 kg)	Nikoloz Sherazadishvili (ESP)	Kenta Nagasawa (JPN)	Axel Clerget (FRA)
Middleweight (−90 kg)	Nikoloz Sherazadishvili (ESP)	Kenta Nagasawa (JPN)	Iván Felipe Silva Morales (CUB)
Half-heavyweight (−100 kg)	Peter Paltchik (ISR)	Varlam Liparteliani (GEO)	Michael Korrel (NED)
Half-heavyweight (−100 kg)	Peter Paltchik (ISR)	Varlam Liparteliani (GEO)	Arman Adamian (RUS)
Heavyweight (+100 kg)	Henk Grol (NED)	Kokoro Kageura (JPN)	Andy Granda (CUB)
Heavyweight (+100 kg)	Henk Grol (NED)	Kokoro Kageura (JPN)	Inal Tasoev (RUS)

=== Women's events ===
Event	Gold	Silver	Bronze
Extra-lightweight (−48 kg)	Daria Bilodid (UKR)	Wakana Koga (JPN)	Mélanie Clément (FRA)
Extra-lightweight (−48 kg)	Daria Bilodid (UKR)	Wakana Koga (JPN)	Mönkhbatyn Urantsetseg (MGL)
Half-lightweight (−52 kg)	Distria Krasniqi (KOS)	Odette Giuffrida (ITA)	Ai Shishime (JPN)
Half-lightweight (−52 kg)	Distria Krasniqi (KOS)	Odette Giuffrida (ITA)	Larissa Pimenta (BRA)
Lightweight (−57 kg)	Christa Deguchi (CAN)	Dorjsürengiin Sumiyaa (MGL)	Momo Tamaoki (JPN)
Lightweight (−57 kg)	Christa Deguchi (CAN)	Dorjsürengiin Sumiyaa (MGL)	Nora Gjakova (KOS)
Half-middleweight (−63 kg)	Clarisse Agbegnenou (FRA)	Nami Nabekura (JPN)	Tina Trstenjak (SLO)
Half-middleweight (−63 kg)	Clarisse Agbegnenou (FRA)	Nami Nabekura (JPN)	Masako Doi (JPN)
Middleweight (−70 kg)	Yoko Ono (JPN)	Saki Niizoe (JPN)	Gemma Howell (GBR)
Middleweight (−70 kg)	Yoko Ono (JPN)	Saki Niizoe (JPN)	Anna Bernholm (SWE)
Half-heavyweight (−78 kg)	Madeleine Malonga (FRA)	Fanny Estelle Posvite (FRA)	Mami Umeki (JPN)
Half-heavyweight (−78 kg)	Madeleine Malonga (FRA)	Fanny Estelle Posvite (FRA)	Kaliema Antomarchi (CUB)
Heavyweight (+78 kg)	Romane Dicko (FRA)	Maryna Slutskaya (BLR)	Rochele Nunes (POR)
Heavyweight (+78 kg)	Romane Dicko (FRA)	Maryna Slutskaya (BLR)	Beatriz Souza (BRA)

Source Results

=== Medal table ===
* Host nation (France)

Rank	Nation	Gold	Silver	Bronze	Total
1	Japan (JPN)	3	5	5	13
2	France (FRA)*	3	1	2	6
3	South Korea (KOR)	1	1	0	2
4	Canada (CAN)	1	0	1	2
4	Kosovo (KOS)	1	0	1	2
4	Netherlands (NED)	1	0	1	2
4	Ukraine (UKR)	1	0	1	2
8	Belgium (BEL)	1	0	0	1
8	Israel (ISR)	1	0	0	1
8	Spain (ESP)	1	0	0	1
11	Mongolia (MGL)	0	1	4	5
12	Russia (RUS)	0	1	2	3
13	Kazakhstan (KAZ)	0	1	1	2
13	Uzbekistan (UZB)	0	1	1	2
15	Belarus (BLR)	0	1	0	1
15	Georgia (GEO)	0	1	0	1
15	Italy (ITA)	0	1	0	1
18	Cuba (CUB)	0	0	3	3
19	Brazil (BRA)	0	0	2	2
20	Great Britain (GBR)	0	0	1	1
20	Portugal (POR)	0	0	1	1
20	Slovenia (SLO)	0	0	1	1
20	Sweden (SWE)	0	0	1	1
Totals (23 entries)		14	14	28	56
