= 2017 Judo Grand Prix Düsseldorf =

Judo competition

Judo 2017 Judo Grand Prix Düsseldorf
- Venue: Mitsubishi Electric Halle
- Location: Düsseldorf, Germany
- Dates: 24–26 February 2017
- Competitors: 344 from 49 nations

Competition at external databases
- Links: IJF • EJU • JudoInside

The 2017 Judo Grand Prix Düsseldorf was held at the Mitsubishi Electric Halle in Düsseldorf, Germany, from 24 to 26 February 2017.

== Medal summary ==
=== Men's events ===
Event	Gold	Silver	Bronze
Extra-lightweight (−60 kg)	Ganbatyn Boldbaatar (MGL)	Amiran Papinashvili (GEO)	Phelipe Pelim (BRA)
Extra-lightweight (−60 kg)	Ganbatyn Boldbaatar (MGL)	Amiran Papinashvili (GEO)	Dashdavaagiin Amartüvshin (MGL)
Half-lightweight (−66 kg)	Vazha Margvelashvili (GEO)	Norihito Isoda (JPN)	Tal Flicker (ISR)
Half-lightweight (−66 kg)	Vazha Margvelashvili (GEO)	Norihito Isoda (JPN)	Kamal Khan-Magomedov (RUS)
Lightweight (−73 kg)	Denis Iartsev (RUS)	Lasha Shavdatuashvili (GEO)	Tommy Macias (SWE)
Lightweight (−73 kg)	Denis Iartsev (RUS)	Lasha Shavdatuashvili (GEO)	Guillaume Chaine (FRA)
Half-middleweight (−81 kg)	Aslan Lappinagov (RUS)	Attila Ungvári (HUN)	Dorin Gotonoaga (MDA)
Half-middleweight (−81 kg)	Aslan Lappinagov (RUS)	Attila Ungvári (HUN)	Ivaylo Ivanov (BUL)
Middleweight (−90 kg)	Beka Gviniashvili (GEO)	Khusen Khalmurzaev (RUS)	Daiki Nishiyama (JPN)
Middleweight (−90 kg)	Beka Gviniashvili (GEO)	Khusen Khalmurzaev (RUS)	Mihael Žgank (SLO)
Half-heavyweight (−100 kg)	Toma Nikiforov (BEL)	Aaron Wolf (JPN)	Michael Korrel (NED)
Half-heavyweight (−100 kg)	Toma Nikiforov (BEL)	Aaron Wolf (JPN)	Kazbek Zankishiev (RUS)
Heavyweight (+100 kg)	Kokoro Kageura (JPN)	Hisayoshi Harasawa (JPN)	Barna Bor (HUN)
Heavyweight (+100 kg)	Kokoro Kageura (JPN)	Hisayoshi Harasawa (JPN)	Yerzhan Shynkeyev (KAZ)

=== Women's events ===
Event	Gold	Silver	Bronze
Extra-lightweight (−48 kg)	Funa Tonaki (JPN)	Mélanie Clément (FRA)	Monica Ungureanu (ROU)
Extra-lightweight (−48 kg)	Funa Tonaki (JPN)	Mélanie Clément (FRA)	Noa Minsker (ISR)
Half-lightweight (−52 kg)	Uta Abe (JPN)	Amandine Buchard (FRA)	Ai Shishime (JPN)
Half-lightweight (−52 kg)	Uta Abe (JPN)	Amandine Buchard (FRA)	Alexandra-Larisa Florian (ROU)
Lightweight (−57 kg)	Theresa Stoll (GER)	Dorjsürengiin Sumiyaa (MGL)	Nae Udaka (JPN)
Lightweight (−57 kg)	Theresa Stoll (GER)	Dorjsürengiin Sumiyaa (MGL)	Jovana Rogić (SRB)
Half-middleweight (−63 kg)	Clarisse Agbegnenou (FRA)	Martyna Trajdos (GER)	Tina Trstenjak (SLO)
Half-middleweight (−63 kg)	Clarisse Agbegnenou (FRA)	Martyna Trajdos (GER)	Nami Nabekura (JPN)
Middleweight (−70 kg)	Chizuru Arai (JPN)	Marie-Ève Gahié (FRA)	Lola Mansour (BEL)
Middleweight (−70 kg)	Chizuru Arai (JPN)	Marie-Ève Gahié (FRA)	Saki Niizoe (JPN)
Half-heavyweight (−78 kg)	Mami Umeki (JPN)	Madeleine Malonga (FRA)	Klara Apotekar (SLO)
Half-heavyweight (−78 kg)	Mami Umeki (JPN)	Madeleine Malonga (FRA)	Rika Takayama (JPN)
Heavyweight (+78 kg)	Iryna Kindzerska (UKR)	Megumi Tachimoto (JPN)	Larisa Cerić (BIH)
Heavyweight (+78 kg)	Iryna Kindzerska (UKR)	Megumi Tachimoto (JPN)	Akira Sone (JPN)

Source Results

=== Medal table ===
* Host nation (Germany)

Rank	Nation	Gold	Silver	Bronze	Total
1	Japan (JPN)	5	4	7	16
2	Georgia (GEO)	2	2	0	4
3	Russia (RUS)	2	1	2	5
4	France (FRA)	1	4	1	6
5	Mongolia (MGL)	1	1	1	3
6	Germany (GER)*	1	1	0	2
7	Belgium (BEL)	1	0	1	2
8	Ukraine (UKR)	1	0	0	1
9	Hungary (HUN)	0	1	1	2
10	Slovenia (SLO)	0	0	3	3
11	Israel (ISR)	0	0	2	2
11	Romania (ROU)	0	0	2	2
13	Bosnia and Herzegovina (BIH)	0	0	1	1
13	Brazil (BRA)	0	0	1	1
13	Bulgaria (BUL)	0	0	1	1
13	Kazakhstan (KAZ)	0	0	1	1
13	Moldova (MDA)	0	0	1	1
13	Netherlands (NED)	0	0	1	1
13	Serbia (SRB)	0	0	1	1
13	Sweden (SWE)	0	0	1	1
Totals (20 entries)		14	14	28	56
