= Momo Tamaoki =

Japanese judoka (born 1994)

Personal information
- Born: 16 September 1994 (age 32) Iwamizawa, Hokkaido, Japan
- Occupation: Judoka

Sport
- Country: Japan
- Sport: Judo
- Weight class: ‍–‍57 kg

Achievements and titles
- World Champ.: (silver) (2021, 2025)
- Asian Champ.: (gold) (2015, 2018, 2022)
- Highest world ranking: 2^{nd}
Medal record
Women's judo
Representing Japan
World Championships
Gold medal – first place	2018 Baku	Mixed team
Gold medal – first place	2019 Tokyo	Mixed team
Gold medal – first place	2021 Budapest	Mixed team
Gold medal – first place	2022 Tashkent	Mixed team
Gold medal – first place	2023 Doha	Mixed team
Gold medal – first place	2024 Abu Dhabi	Mixed team
Gold medal – first place	2026 Baku	Mixed team
Silver medal – second place	2021 Budapest	‍–‍57 kg
Silver medal – second place	2025 Budapest	‍–‍57 kg
Bronze medal – third place	2024 Abu Dhabi	‍–‍57 kg
Bronze medal – third place	2025 Budapest	Mixed team
Asian Games
Gold medal – first place	2018 Jakarta	‍–‍57 kg
Gold medal – first place	2018 Jakarta	Mixed team
Gold medal – first place	2023 Hangzhou	Mixed team
Silver medal – second place	2023 Hangzhou	‍–‍57 kg
Asian Championships
Gold medal – first place	2015 Kuwait City	‍–‍57 kg
Gold medal – first place	2022 Nur‑Sultan	‍–‍57 kg
World Masters
Silver medal – second place	2019 Qingdao	‍–‍57 kg
Bronze medal – third place	2018 Guangzhou	‍–‍57 kg
IJF Grand Slam
Gold medal – first place	2019 Osaka	‍–‍57 kg
Gold medal – first place	2021 Tashkent	‍–‍57 kg
Gold medal – first place	2021 Baku	‍–‍57 kg
Gold medal – first place	2023 Tashkent	‍–‍57 kg
Gold medal – first place	2025 Baku	‍–‍57 kg
Silver medal – second place	2018 Osaka	‍–‍57 kg
Silver medal – second place	2022 Paris	‍–‍57 kg
Silver medal – second place	2025 Astana	‍–‍57 kg
Silver medal – second place	2025 Tokyo	‍–‍57 kg
Bronze medal – third place	2016 Tokyo	‍–‍57 kg
Bronze medal – third place	2017 Tokyo	‍–‍57 kg
Bronze medal – third place	2018 Ekaterinburg	‍–‍57 kg
Bronze medal – third place	2019 Paris	‍–‍57 kg
Bronze medal – third place	2020 Paris	‍–‍57 kg
Bronze medal – third place	2022 Tokyo	‍–‍57 kg
Bronze medal – third place	2026 Paris	‍–‍57 kg
IJF Grand Prix
Gold medal – first place	2016 Budapest	‍–‍57 kg
Gold medal – first place	2017 Hohhot	‍–‍57 kg
Gold medal – first place	2017 Zagreb	‍–‍57 kg
Gold medal – first place	2025 Qingdao	‍–‍57 kg
Silver medal – second place	2019 Zagreb	‍–‍57 kg
Bronze medal – third place	2015 Budapest	‍–‍57 kg
Bronze medal – third place	2018 Hohhot	‍–‍57 kg
Bronze medal – third place	2026 Qingdao	‍–‍57 kg
World Juniors Championships
Gold medal – first place	2014 Fort Lauderdale	‍–‍57 kg
Silver medal – second place	2010 Agadir	‍–‍48 kg
Asian Junior Championships
Gold medal – first place	2013 Hainan	‍–‍57 kg

Profile at external databases
- IJF: 3631
- JudoInside.com: 66625
- Updated on 11 October 2026

Momo Tamaoki (玉置 桃, Tamaoki Momo; born 16 September 1994) is a Japanese judoka who competes in the women's 57 kg division.

== Career ==
Tamaoki participated at the 2018 World Championships, winning a medal in the mixed team event.

Tamaoki won the silver medal in the women's 57 kg event at the 2019 World Masters held in Qingdao, China.
