= 2018 Judo Grand Slam Osaka =

Judo competition

Judo 2018 Judo Grand Slam Osaka
- Venue: Osaka Municipal Central Gymnasium
- Location: Osaka, Japan
- Dates: 23–25 November 2018
- Competitors: 415 from 70 nations

Competition at external databases
- Links: IJF • EJU • JudoInside

The 2018 Judo Grand Slam were held in Osaka, Japan, from 23 to 25 November 2018.

== Medal summary ==
=== Men's events ===
Event	Gold	Silver	Bronze
Extra-lightweight (−60 kg)	Ryuju Nagayama (JPN)	Yago Abuladze (RUS)	Yuma Oshima (JPN)
Extra-lightweight (−60 kg)	Ryuju Nagayama (JPN)	Yago Abuladze (RUS)	Kim Won-jin (KOR)
Half-lightweight (−66 kg)	Joshiro Maruyama (JPN)	Hifumi Abe (JPN)	Aram Grigoryan (RUS)
Half-lightweight (−66 kg)	Joshiro Maruyama (JPN)	Hifumi Abe (JPN)	Yondonperenlein Baskhüü (MGL)
Lightweight (−73 kg)	Shohei Ono (JPN)	Masashi Ebinuma (JPN)	Tommy Macias (SWE)
Lightweight (−73 kg)	Shohei Ono (JPN)	Masashi Ebinuma (JPN)	Arata Tatsukawa (JPN)
Half-middleweight (−81 kg)	Takeshi Sasaki (JPN)	Kenya Kohara (JPN)	Vedat Albayrak (TUR)
Half-middleweight (−81 kg)	Takeshi Sasaki (JPN)	Kenya Kohara (JPN)	Takanori Nagase (JPN)
Middleweight (−90 kg)	Shoichiro Mukai (JPN)	Noël van 't End (NED)	Eduard Trippel (GER)
Middleweight (−90 kg)	Shoichiro Mukai (JPN)	Noël van 't End (NED)	Sanshiro Murao (JPN)
Half-heavyweight (−100 kg)	Aaron Wolf (JPN)	Shady El Nahas (CAN)	Jorge Fonseca (POR)
Half-heavyweight (−100 kg)	Aaron Wolf (JPN)	Shady El Nahas (CAN)	Kentaro Iida (JPN)
Heavyweight (+100 kg)	Henk Grol (NED)	Lukáš Krpálek (CZE)	Kokoro Kageura (JPN)
Heavyweight (+100 kg)	Henk Grol (NED)	Lukáš Krpálek (CZE)	Tamerlan Bashaev (RUS)

=== Women's events ===
Event	Gold	Silver	Bronze
Extra-lightweight (−48 kg)	Funa Tonaki (JPN)	Mönkhbatyn Urantsetseg (MGL)	Ami Kondo (JPN)
Extra-lightweight (−48 kg)	Funa Tonaki (JPN)	Mönkhbatyn Urantsetseg (MGL)	Hiromi Endō (JPN)
Half-lightweight (−52 kg)	Uta Abe (JPN)	Natsumi Tsunoda (JPN)	Amandine Buchard (FRA)
Half-lightweight (−52 kg)	Uta Abe (JPN)	Natsumi Tsunoda (JPN)	Ai Shishime (JPN)
Lightweight (−57 kg)	Jessica Klimkait (CAN)	Momo Tamaoki (JPN)	Kwon You-jeong (KOR)
Lightweight (−57 kg)	Jessica Klimkait (CAN)	Momo Tamaoki (JPN)	Haruka Funakubo (JPN)
Half-middleweight (−63 kg)	Masako Doi (JPN)	Nami Nabekura (JPN)	Miku Tashiro (JPN)
Half-middleweight (−63 kg)	Masako Doi (JPN)	Nami Nabekura (JPN)	Aimi Nouchi (JPN)
Middleweight (−70 kg)	Chizuru Arai (JPN)	Anna Bernholm (SWE)	Saki Niizoe (JPN)
Middleweight (−70 kg)	Chizuru Arai (JPN)	Anna Bernholm (SWE)	Margaux Pinot (FRA)
Half-heavyweight (−78 kg)	Ruika Sato (JPN)	Mami Umeki (JPN)	Shori Hamada (JPN)
Half-heavyweight (−78 kg)	Ruika Sato (JPN)	Mami Umeki (JPN)	Kaliema Antomarchi (CUB)
Heavyweight (+78 kg)	Idalys Ortiz (CUB)	Akira Sone (JPN)	Sarah Asahina (JPN)
Heavyweight (+78 kg)	Idalys Ortiz (CUB)	Akira Sone (JPN)	Nami Inamori (JPN)

Source Results

=== Medal table ===
* Host nation (Japan)

Rank	Nation	Gold	Silver	Bronze	Total
1	Japan (JPN)*	11	8	16	35
2	Canada (CAN)	1	1	0	2
2	Netherlands (NED)	1	1	0	2
4	Cuba (CUB)	1	0	1	2
5	Russia (RUS)	0	1	2	3
6	Mongolia (MGL)	0	1	1	2
6	Sweden (SWE)	0	1	1	2
8	Czech Republic (CZE)	0	1	0	1
9	France (FRA)	0	0	2	2
9	South Korea (KOR)	0	0	2	2
11	Germany (GER)	0	0	1	1
11	Portugal (POR)	0	0	1	1
11	Turkey (TUR)	0	0	1	1
Totals (13 entries)		14	14	28	56
