= Akira Sone =

Japanese judoka (born 2000)

Personal information
- Born: 9 July 2000 (age 26) Kurume, Fukuoka, Japan
- Occupation: Judoka
- Height: 1.63 m (5 ft 4 in)

Sport
- Country: Japan
- Sport: Judo
- Weight class: +78 kg

Achievements and titles
- Olympic Games: (gold) (2020)
- World Champ.: (gold) (2019, 2023)
- Asian Champ.: (gold) (2018, 2022)
Medal record
Women's judo
Representing Japan
Olympic Games
Gold medal – first place	2020 Tokyo	+78 kg
Silver medal – second place	2020 Tokyo	Mixed team
Silver medal – second place	2024 Paris	Mixed team
World Championships
Gold medal – first place	2019 Tokyo	+78 kg
Gold medal – first place	2023 Doha	+78 kg
Gold medal – first place	2023 Doha	Mixed team
Gold medal – first place	2026 Baku	Mixed team
Asian Games
Gold medal – first place	2018 Jakarta	+78 kg
Asian Championships
Gold medal – first place	2022 Nur‑Sultan	+78 kg
World Masters
Gold medal – first place	2018 Guangzhou	+78 kg
Bronze medal – third place	2022 Jerusalem	+78 kg
IJF Grand Slam
Gold medal – first place	2019 Osaka	+78 kg
Gold medal – first place	2021 Tashkent	+78 kg
Gold medal – first place	2022 Tokyo	+78 kg
Gold medal – first place	2026 Tashkent	+78 kg
Silver medal – second place	2016 Tokyo	+78 kg
Silver medal – second place	2017 Tokyo	+78 kg
Silver medal – second place	2018 Osaka	+78 kg
Bronze medal – third place	2018 Paris	+78 kg
Bronze medal – third place	2019 Paris	+78 kg
Bronze medal – third place	2024 Astana	+78 kg
IJF Grand Prix
Gold medal – first place	2018 Hohhot	+78 kg
Gold medal – first place	2019 Zagreb	+78 kg
Bronze medal – third place	2017 Düsseldorf	+78 kg
World Juniors Championships
Gold medal – first place	2017 Zagreb	+78 kg
World Cadets Championships
Gold medal – first place	2015 Sarajevo	+70 kg

Profile at external databases
- IJF: 23619
- JudoInside.com: 97090
- Updated on 11 October 2026

Akira Sone (素根 輝, Sone Akira; born 9 July 2000) is a Japanese judoka. She won the gold medal in the Women's +78 kg event at the 2020 Summer Olympics and a silver medal with the Japanese team in the mixed team event at both the 2020 and 2024 Summer Olympics. She is also a two-time world champion in her weight category. Sone's favorite techniques are Tai Otoshi and Ouchi Gari.

== Career ==
Sone started Judo at the age of 7, following her three brothers. In April 2013, she went on to Tanushimaru Junior High School. In August 2015, Sone won the World Judo Championships Cadets and the National Junior High School Championships. In April 2016, she began studying at Nanchiku High School. In March 2017, she won the National High School Championships. She won the Inter-High School Championships in August 2017. In October 2017, Sone won the World Judo Championships Juniors(+78 kg weight class). In April 2018, she won the All-Japan Judo Championships. In August 2018, Sone won the Asian Games.

Sone won the gold medal in the women's +78 kg event, and silver in the mixed team event, at the 2020 Summer Olympics held in Tokyo, Japan.
