= Ryuju Nagayama =

Japanese judoka (born 1996)

Personal information
- Native name: 永山竜樹
- Born: 15 April 1996 (age 30) Bibai, Hokkaido, Japan
- Occupation: Judoka
- Height: 1.58 m (5 ft 2 in)

Sport
- Country: Japan
- Sport: Judo
- Weight class: ‍–‍60 kg

Achievements and titles
- Olympic Games: (bronze) (2024)
- World Champ.: (gold) (2025)
- Asian Champ.: (gold) (2022)
- Highest world ranking: 1^{st}
Medal record
Men's judo
Representing Japan
Olympic Games
Silver medal – second place	2024 Paris	Mixed team
Bronze medal – third place	2024 Paris	‍–‍60 kg
World Championships
Gold medal – first place	2025 Budapest	‍–‍60 kg
Bronze medal – third place	2018 Baku	‍–‍60 kg
Bronze medal – third place	2019 Tokyo	‍–‍60 kg
Bronze medal – third place	2026 Baku	‍–‍60 kg
Asian Championships
Gold medal – first place	2022 Nur‑Sultan	‍–‍60 kg
World Masters
Gold medal – first place	2017 Saint Petersburg	‍–‍60 kg
Gold medal – first place	2019 Qingdao	‍–‍60 kg
Gold medal – first place	2023 Budapest	‍–‍60 kg
Silver medal – second place	2022 Jerusalem	‍–‍60 kg
IJF Grand Slam
Gold medal – first place	2016 Tokyo	‍–‍60 kg
Gold medal – first place	2017 Ekaterinburg	‍–‍60 kg
Gold medal – first place	2018 Düsseldorf	‍–‍60 kg
Gold medal – first place	2018 Osaka	‍–‍60 kg
Gold medal – first place	2019 Düsseldorf	‍–‍60 kg
Gold medal – first place	2020 Paris	‍–‍60 kg
Gold medal – first place	2021 Tashkent	‍–‍60 kg
Gold medal – first place	2022 Paris	‍–‍60 kg
Gold medal – first place	2022 Ulaanbaatar	‍–‍60 kg
Gold medal – first place	2023 Ulaanbaatar	‍–‍60 kg
Gold medal – first place	2023 Tokyo	‍–‍60 kg
Gold medal – first place	2025 Baku	‍–‍60 kg
Silver medal – second place	2016 Baku	‍–‍60 kg
Silver medal – second place	2019 Osaka	‍–‍60 kg
Silver medal – second place	2024 Tokyo	‍–‍60 kg
Silver medal – second place	2026 Ulaanbaatar	‍–‍60 kg
Bronze medal – third place	2017 Tokyo	‍–‍60 kg
Bronze medal – third place	2025 Tokyo	‍–‍60 kg
IJF Grand Prix
Gold medal – first place	2018 Budapest	‍–‍60 kg
World Juniors Championships
Gold medal – first place	2015 Abu Dhabi	‍–‍60 kg
Asian Junior Championships
Gold medal – first place	2012 Taipei	‍–‍55 kg
World Cadets Championships
Gold medal – first place	2011 Kyiv	‍–‍50 kg

Profile at external databases
- IJF: 7350
- JudoInside.com: 79486
- Updated on 4 October 2026

Ryuju Nagayama (Japanese: 永山竜樹, romanized: Nagayama Ryuju; born 15 April 1996) is a Japanese judoka and judo World Champion.

He participated at the 2018 and 2019 World Championships, winning bronze medals in both. He then won one of the bronze medals in the men's 60 kg event at the 2024 Summer Olympics held in Paris, France, and one year later the gold medal in that same weight category at the 2025 World Championships.
