= 2019 Judo Grand Slam Osaka =

Judo competition

Judo 2019 Judo Grand Slam Osaka
- Venue: Osaka Municipal Central Gymnasium
- Location: Osaka, Japan
- Dates: 22–24 November 2019
- Competitors: 481 from 87 nations

Competition at external databases
- Links: IJF • EJU • JudoInside

The 2019 Judo Grand Slam Osaka was held in Osaka, Japan from 22 to 24 November 2019.

== Medal summary ==
=== Men's events ===
Event	Gold	Silver	Bronze
Extra-lightweight (−60 kg)	Naohisa Takato (JPN)	Ryuju Nagayama (JPN)	Kim Won-jin (KOR)
Extra-lightweight (−60 kg)	Naohisa Takato (JPN)	Ryuju Nagayama (JPN)	Yang Yung-wei (TPE)
Half-lightweight (−66 kg)	Hifumi Abe (JPN)	Joshiro Maruyama (JPN)	Yuji Aida (JPN)
Half-lightweight (−66 kg)	Hifumi Abe (JPN)	Joshiro Maruyama (JPN)	Yuki Nishiyama (JPN)
Lightweight (−73 kg)	Masashi Ebinuma (JPN)	Soichi Hashimoto (JPN)	Ganbaataryn Odbayar (MGL)
Lightweight (−73 kg)	Masashi Ebinuma (JPN)	Soichi Hashimoto (JPN)	Somon Makhmadbekov (TJK)
Half-middleweight (−81 kg)	Takanori Nagase (JPN)	Sotaro Fujiwara (JPN)	Frank de Wit (NED)
Half-middleweight (−81 kg)	Takanori Nagase (JPN)	Sotaro Fujiwara (JPN)	Turpal Tepkaev (RUS)
Middleweight (−90 kg)	Beka Gviniashvili (GEO)	Davlat Bobonov (UZB)	Gwak Dong-han (KOR)
Middleweight (−90 kg)	Beka Gviniashvili (GEO)	Davlat Bobonov (UZB)	Shoichiro Mukai (JPN)
Half-heavyweight (−100 kg)	Ryunosuke Haga (JPN)	Elmar Gasimov (AZE)	Kentaro Iida (JPN)
Half-heavyweight (−100 kg)	Ryunosuke Haga (JPN)	Elmar Gasimov (AZE)	Aaron Wolf (JPN)
Heavyweight (+100 kg)	Inal Tasoev (RUS)	Hyōga Ōta (JPN)	Kokoro Kageura (JPN)
Heavyweight (+100 kg)	Inal Tasoev (RUS)	Hyōga Ōta (JPN)	Alisher Yusupov (UZB)

=== Women's events ===
Event	Gold	Silver	Bronze
Extra-lightweight (−48 kg)	Funa Tonaki (JPN)	Julia Figueroa (ESP)	Natsumi Tsunoda (JPN)
Extra-lightweight (−48 kg)	Funa Tonaki (JPN)	Julia Figueroa (ESP)	Wakana Koga (JPN)
Half-lightweight (−52 kg)	Amandine Buchard (FRA)	Uta Abe (JPN)	Chishima Maeda (JPN)
Half-lightweight (−52 kg)	Amandine Buchard (FRA)	Uta Abe (JPN)	Ai Shishime (JPN)
Lightweight (−57 kg)	Momo Tamaoki (JPN)	Lien Chen-ling (TPE)	Dorjsürengiin Sumiyaa (MGL)
Lightweight (−57 kg)	Momo Tamaoki (JPN)	Lien Chen-ling (TPE)	Jessica Klimkait (CAN)
Half-middleweight (−63 kg)	Masako Doi (JPN)	Nana Kota (JPN)	Nami Nabekura (JPN)
Half-middleweight (−63 kg)	Masako Doi (JPN)	Nana Kota (JPN)	Miku Takaichi (JPN)
Middleweight (−70 kg)	Yoko Ono (JPN)	Kim Polling (NED)	Chizuru Arai (JPN)
Middleweight (−70 kg)	Yoko Ono (JPN)	Kim Polling (NED)	Giovanna Scoccimarro (GER)
Half-heavyweight (−78 kg)	Mami Umeki (JPN)	Shori Hamada (JPN)	Mao Izumi (JPN)
Half-heavyweight (−78 kg)	Mami Umeki (JPN)	Shori Hamada (JPN)	Fanny Estelle Posvite (FRA)
Heavyweight (+78 kg)	Akira Sone (JPN)	Idalys Ortiz (CUB)	Sarah Asahina (JPN)
Heavyweight (+78 kg)	Akira Sone (JPN)	Idalys Ortiz (CUB)	Beatriz Souza (BRA)

Source Results

=== Medal table ===
* Host nation (Japan)

Rank	Nation	Gold	Silver	Bronze	Total
1	Japan (JPN)*	11	8	15	34
2	France (FRA)	1	0	1	2
2	Russia (RUS)	1	0	1	2
4	Georgia (GEO)	1	0	0	1
5	Chinese Taipei (TPE)	0	1	1	2
5	Netherlands (NED)	0	1	1	2
5	Uzbekistan (UZB)	0	1	1	2
8	Azerbaijan (AZE)	0	1	0	1
8	Cuba (CUB)	0	1	0	1
8	Spain (ESP)	0	1	0	1
11	Mongolia (MGL)	0	0	2	2
11	South Korea (KOR)	0	0	2	2
13	Brazil (BRA)	0	0	1	1
13	Canada (CAN)	0	0	1	1
13	Germany (GER)	0	0	1	1
13	Tajikistan (TJK)	0	0	1	1
Totals (16 entries)		14	14	28	56
