= Viktor Demyanenko (judoka) =

Kazakhstani judoka (born 1991)

Personal information
- Born: 11 June 1991 (age 35)
- Occupation: Judoka

Sport
- Country: Kazakhstan
- Sport: Judo
- Weight class: ‍–‍100 kg

Achievements and titles
- World Champ.: R64 (2018)
- Asian Champ.: (bronze) (2012)
Medal record
Men's judo
Representing Kazakhstan
Asian Championships
Bronze medal – third place	2012 Tashkent	‍–‍100 kg
IJF Grand Prix
Bronze medal – third place	2016 Tashkent	‍–‍100 kg
Bronze medal – third place	2018 Tunis	‍–‍100 kg
World Juniors Championships
Bronze medal – third place	2010 Agadir	‍–‍100 kg

Profile at external databases
- IJF: 1168
- JudoInside.com: 61915
- Updated on 5 December 2022

Viktor Demyanenko (born 11 June 1991) is a Kazakhstani judoka.

Demyanenko is the bronze medallist of the 2018 Judo Grand Prix Tunis in the ‍–‍100 kg category.
