= Miku Tashiro =

Japanese judoka (born 1994)

Miku Takaichi
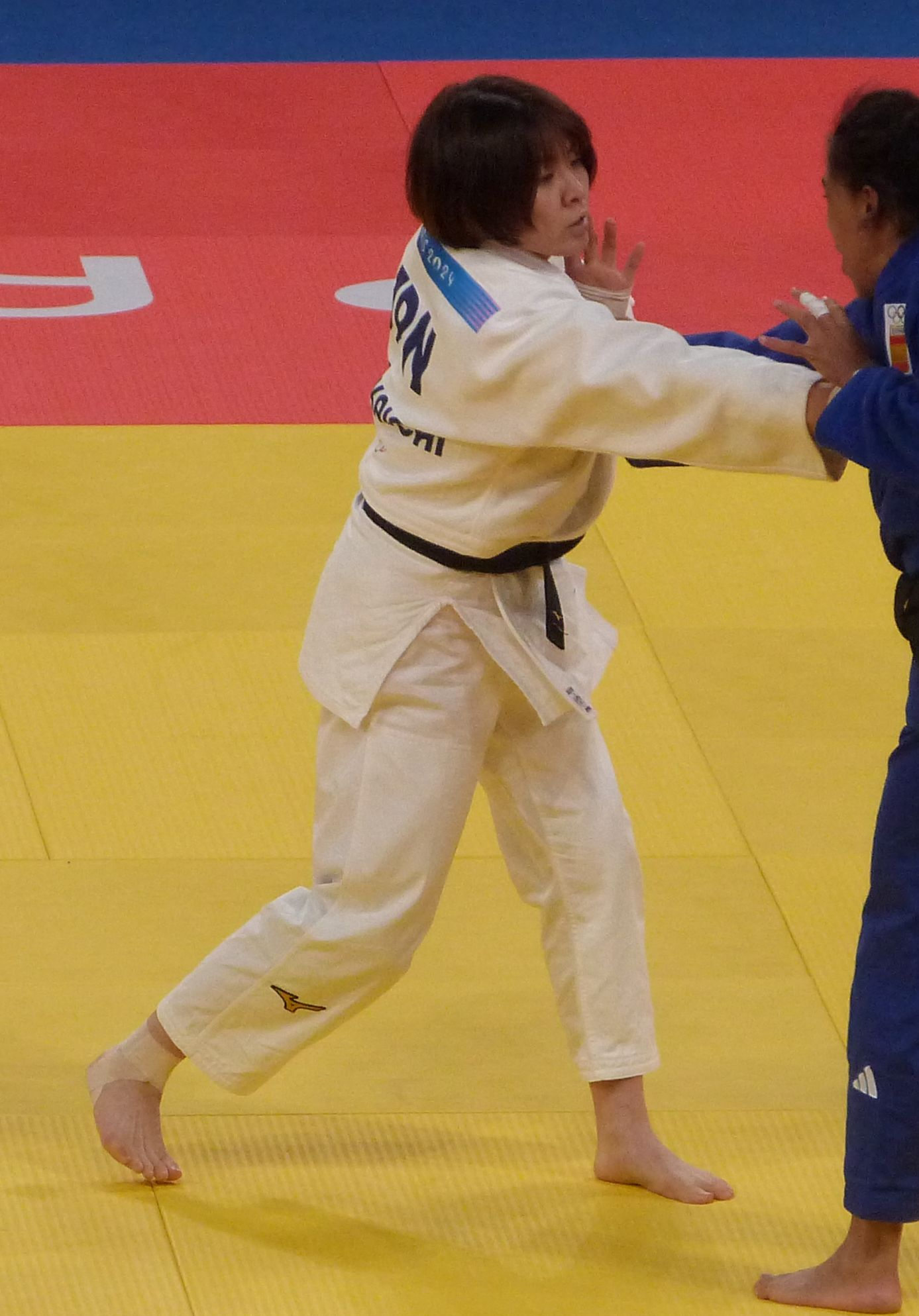
- Takaichi in 2024

Personal information
- Born: Miku Tashiro; 25 January 1994 (age 32) Tokyo, Japan
- Occupation: Judoka
- Height: 1.63 m (5 ft 4 in)
- Spouse: Kengo Takaichi (m. 2022)

Sport
- Country: Japan
- Sport: Judo
- Weight class: ‍–‍63 kg
- Retired: 30 October 2024

Achievements and titles
- Olympic Games: 5th (2016)
- World Champ.: (silver) (2018, 2019)
- Asian Champ.: (gold) (2023)
Medal record
Women's judo
Representing Japan
Olympic Games
| Silver medal – second place | 2020 Tokyo | Mixed team |
| Silver medal – second place | 2024 Paris | Mixed team |
World Championships
| Silver medal – second place | 2018 Baku | ‍–‍63 kg |
| Silver medal – second place | 2019 Tokyo | ‍–‍63 kg |
| Bronze medal – third place | 2014 Chelyabinsk | ‍–‍63 kg |
| Bronze medal – third place | 2015 Astana | ‍–‍63 kg |
Asian Games
| Gold medal – first place | 2023 Hangzhou | ‍–‍63 kg |
World Masters
| Gold medal – first place | 2015 Rabat | ‍–‍63 kg |
| Gold medal – first place | 2016 Guadalajara | ‍–‍63 kg |
| Gold medal – first place | 2017 Saint Petersburg | ‍–‍63 kg |
| Gold medal – first place | 2022 Jerusalem | ‍–‍63 kg |
| Silver medal – second place | 2023 Budapest | ‍–‍63 kg |
| Bronze medal – third place | 2018 Guangzhou | ‍–‍63 kg |
| Bronze medal – third place | 2019 Qingdao | ‍–‍63 kg |
IJF Grand Slam
| Gold medal – first place | 2017 Tokyo | ‍–‍63 kg |
| Gold medal – first place | 2019 Düsseldorf | ‍–‍63 kg |
| Gold medal – first place | 2019 Baku | ‍–‍63 kg |
| Gold medal – first place | 2020 Düsseldorf | ‍–‍63 kg |
| Gold medal – first place | 2021 Tashkent | ‍–‍63 kg |
| Gold medal – first place | 2022 Tokyo | ‍–‍63 kg |
| Gold medal – first place | 2023 Tokyo | ‍–‍63 kg |
| Silver medal – second place | 2013 Tokyo | ‍–‍63 kg |
| Silver medal – second place | 2016 Paris | ‍–‍63 kg |
| Silver medal – second place | 2018 Paris | ‍–‍63 kg |
| Bronze medal – third place | 2014 Paris | ‍–‍63 kg |
| Bronze medal – third place | 2015 Tokyo | ‍–‍63 kg |
| Bronze medal – third place | 2018 Osaka | ‍–‍63 kg |
| Bronze medal – third place | 2019 Osaka | ‍–‍63 kg |
| Bronze medal – third place | 2024 Antalya | ‍–‍63 kg |
IJF Grand Prix
| Gold medal – first place | 2014 Budapest | ‍–‍63 kg |
| Gold medal – first place | 2017 Hohhot | ‍–‍63 kg |
| Bronze medal – third place | 2015 Düsseldorf | ‍–‍63 kg |
World Juniors Championships
| Gold medal – first place | 2010 Agadir | ‍–‍63 kg |
World Cadets Championships
| Gold medal – first place | 2009 Budapest | ‍–‍63 kg |
Youth Olympic Games
| Gold medal – first place | 2010 Singapore | ‍–‍63 kg |

Profile at external databases
- IJF: 3637
- JudoInside.com: 56672
- Updated on 5 August 2024

Miku Takaichi (髙市 未来, Takaichi Miku), née Miku Tashiro (田代 未来, Tashiro Miku; born 7 April 1994), is a Japanese retired judoka. She competed at the 2020 Summer Olympics and 2024 Summer Olympics, winning a silver medals at both in the mixed team event.

== Career ==
Tashiro started judo at the age of 8. Her favorite techniques are Uchi mata and Ōuchi gari.

In 2009, Tashiro won the gold medal in the 63 kg weight class at the World Judo Cadets Championships. In 2010, she won the gold medal in the 63 kg weight class at the Youth Olympics and the World Juniors Championships.

In 2011, Tashiro suffered an anterior cruciate ligament injury at the Kinshuki High School Judo Tournament. The next year she returned to the tatami after long rehabilitation.

In 2013, Tashiro took a position at Komatsu Limited after graduating from Shukutoku High School.

Tashiro won a bronze medal in the Extra-lightweight (63 kg) division at the 2014 World Championships.

In November 2022, Tashiro married Kengo Takaichi, a judoka and former Japanese men's national team player. As a result, her registered name was changed to "Miku Takaichi", and she participated in tournaments as Miku Takaichi from the December 2022 Tokyo Grand Slam, where she won the women's 63 kg class gold medal.
