= Lechi Ediev =

Russian judoka (born 1992)

Personal information
- Nationality: Russian
- Born: 12 December 1992 (age 33)
- Occupation: Judoka

Sport
- Country: Russia
- Sport: Judo
- Weight class: –73 kg
Medal record
World Championships
Bronze medal – third place	2019 Tokyo	Mixed team
European U23 Championships
Bronze medal – third place	2014 Wrocław	–60 kg

Profile at external databases
- IJF: 17353
- JudoInside.com: 91297

Lechi Ediev (born 12 December 1992) is a Russian judoka.

He won a medal at the 2019 World Judo Championships.
