= Chizuru Arai =

Japanese judoka (born 1993)

Personal information
- Nationality: Japanese
- Born: 1 November 1993 (age 32) Yorii, Japan
- Occupation: Judoka
- Height: 1.72 m (5 ft 8 in)

Sport
- Country: Japan
- Sport: Judo
- Weight class: –70 kg
- Retired: 10 September 2021

Achievements and titles
- Olympic Games: (gold) (2020)
- World Champ.: (2017, 2018)
- Asian Champ.: (silver) (2014)
Medal record
Women's judo
Representing Japan
Olympic Games
Gold medal – first place	2020 Tokyo	‍–‍70 kg
Silver medal – second place	2020 Tokyo	Mixed team
World Championships
Gold medal – first place	2017 Budapest	‍–‍70 kg
Gold medal – first place	2018 Baku	‍–‍70 kg
Asian Games
Gold medal – first place	2014 Incheon	Women's team
Silver medal – second place	2014 Incheon	‍–‍70 kg
World Masters
Bronze medal – third place	2015 Rabat	‍–‍70 kg
Bronze medal – third place	2019 Qingdao	‍–‍70 kg
IJF Grand Slam
Gold medal – first place	2013 Tokyo	‍–‍70 kg
Gold medal – first place	2015 Tokyo	‍–‍70 kg
Gold medal – first place	2016 Tyumen	‍–‍70 kg
Gold medal – first place	2017 Paris	‍–‍70 kg
Gold medal – first place	2018 Osaka	‍–‍70 kg
Gold medal – first place	2019 Baku	‍–‍70 kg
Gold medal – first place	2020 Düsseldorf	‍–‍70 kg
Gold medal – first place	2021 Tashkent	‍–‍70 kg
Silver medal – second place	2013 Moscow	‍–‍70 kg
Silver medal – second place	2016 Tokyo	‍–‍70 kg
Silver medal – second place	2017 Tokyo	‍–‍70 kg
Silver medal – second place	2018 Paris	‍–‍70 kg
Bronze medal – third place	2014 Tyumen	‍–‍70 kg
Bronze medal – third place	2015 Abu Dhabi	‍–‍70 kg
Bronze medal – third place	2019 Osaka	‍–‍70 kg
Bronze medal – third place	2021 Kazan	‍–‍70 kg
IJF Grand Prix
Gold medal – first place	2015 Düsseldorf	‍–‍70 kg
Gold medal – first place	2017 Düsseldorf	‍–‍70 kg
Silver medal – second place	2016 Düsseldorf	‍–‍70 kg
Bronze medal – third place	2014 Düsseldorf	‍–‍70 kg
Bronze medal – third place	2018 Hohhot	‍–‍70 kg
World Juniors Championships
Silver medal – second place	2013 Ljubljana	‍–‍70 kg
Asian Junior Championships
Gold medal – first place	2012 Taipei	‍–‍70 kg

Profile at external databases
- IJF: 11690
- JudoInside.com: 84239
- Updated on 23 May 2023

Chizuru Arai (新井 千鶴, Arai Chizuru; born 1 November 1993) is a Japanese retired judoka. Arai won the gold medal in judo's 70 kg division, and silver in the mixed team event, at the 2020 Summer Olympics.

== Career ==
She competed at the 2014 Judo Grand Prix Düsseldorf, finishing third, and 2015 Judo Grand Prix Düsseldorf. She won a gold medal at the 2017 World Judo Championships in Budapest.
