= Judo at the Summer World University Games =

Judo competition

- Events: 14 (men: 7; women: 7)

Games
- 1959; 1960; 1961; 1962; 1963; 1964; 1965; 1966; 1967; 1968; 1970; 1970; 1973; 1972; 1975; 1975; 1977; 1978; 1979; 1981; 1983; 1985; 1987; 1989; 1991; 1993; 1995; 1997; 1999; 2001; 2003; 2005; 2007; 2009; 2011; 2013; 2015; 2017; 2019; 2021; 2025

Judo has been a Universiade compulsory event since 2007 in Bangkok, Thailand. Before this, judo was an optional sport in the 1967, 1985, 1995, 2001 and 2003 editions.

== Editions ==
Games	Year	Host city	Host country	Winner	Second	Third
V	1967	Tokyo	Japan	Japan	South Korea	France
XIII	1985	Kobe	Japan	South Korea	Japan	North Korea
XVIII	1995	Fukuoka	Japan	Japan	South Korea	Cuba
XX	1999	Palma de Mallorca	Spain	Japan	Cuba	Netherlands
XXI	2001	Beijing	China	China	Japan	Cuba
XXII	2003	Daegu	South Korea	Japan	France	South Korea
XXIV	2007	Bangkok	Thailand	Japan	South Korea	China
XXV	2009	Belgrade	Serbia	Japan	South Korea	France
XXVI	2011	Shenzhen	China	Japan	South Korea	Russia
XXVII	2013	Kazan	Russia	South Korea	Japan	Russia
XXVIII	2015	Gwangju	South Korea	South Korea	Japan	Russia
XXVIX	2017	Taipei	Taiwan	Japan	South Korea	Brazil
XXX	2019	Naples	Italy	Japan	Russia	South Korea
XXXI	2021	Chengdu	China	Japan	South Korea	Germany
XXXII	2025	Rhine-Ruhr	Germany	Japan	South Korea	Germany

== Medal table ==
Last updated after the 2025 Summer World University Games

Rank	Nation	Gold	Silver	Bronze	Total
1	Japan (JPN)	91	31	52	174
2	South Korea (KOR)	46	49	50	145
3	China (CHN)	16	7	17	40
4	France (FRA)	11	24	36	71
5	Russia (RUS)	11	21	48	80
6	Cuba (CUB)	9	8	14	31
7	Netherlands (NED)	7	4	8	19
8	Uzbekistan (UZB)	4	7	11	22
9	Brazil (BRA)	3	9	31	43
10	Poland (POL)	3	6	7	16
11	Mongolia (MGL)	3	5	9	17
12	Azerbaijan (AZE)	3	5	7	15
13	Hungary (HUN)	3	3	12	18
14	North Korea (PRK)	3	3	7	13
15	Germany (GER)	2	4	19	25
16	Czech Republic (CZE)	2	1	9	12
17	Moldova (MDA)	2	1	3	6
18	Georgia (GEO)	1	6	7	14
19	Ukraine (UKR)	1	4	15	20
20	Spain (ESP)	1	4	5	10
21	Romania (ROU)	1	3	8	12
22	Great Britain (GBR)	1	3	6	10
23	Chinese Taipei (TPE)	1	2	3	6
24	Canada (CAN)	1	2	2	5
25	Kazakhstan (KAZ)	1	1	13	15
26	Italy (ITA)	1	1	11	13
27	Portugal (POR)	1	0	5	6
28	Soviet Union (URS)	1	0	3	4
29	Austria (AUT)	1	0	2	3
30	Individual Neutral Athletes (AIN)	0	2	1	3
31	Estonia (EST)	0	2	0	2
32	Lithuania (LTU)	0	1	5	6
33	Armenia (ARM)	0	1	4	5
33	Turkey (TUR)	0	1	4	5
33	United States (USA)	0	1	4	5
36	Algeria (ALG)	0	1	2	3
36	Belgium (BEL)	0	1	2	3
36	Serbia and Montenegro (SCG)	0	1	2	3
36	Slovakia (SVK)	0	1	2	3
40	Argentina (ARG)	0	1	1	2
41	Cameroon (CMR)	0	1	0	1
41	Croatia (CRO)	0	1	0	1
41	Kosovo (KOS)	0	1	0	1
41	Serbia (SRB)	0	1	0	1
45	Belarus (BLR)	0	0	5	5
46	Bulgaria (BUL)	0	0	2	2
46	Finland (FIN)	0	0	2	2
46	Iran (IRI)	0	0	2	2
46	Switzerland (SUI)	0	0	2	2
50	Bosnia and Herzegovina (BIH)	0	0	1	1
50	Cyprus (CYP)	0	0	1	1
50	India (IND)	0	0	1	1
50	Indonesia (INA)	0	0	1	1
Totals (53 entries)		231	231	464	926

== Current events ==
	Extra lightweight	Half lightweight	Lightweight	Half middleweight	Middleweight	Half heavyweight	Heavyweight	Open	Team
Men	Under 60 kg (130 lb; 9.4 st)	60–66 kg (132–146 lb; 9.4–10.4 st)	66–73 kg (146–161 lb; 10.4–11.5 st)	73–81 kg (161–179 lb; 11.5–12.8 st)	81–90 kg (179–198 lb; 12.8–14.2 st)	90–100 kg (200–220 lb; 14–16 st)	Over 100 kg (220 lb; 16 st)		
Women	Under 48 kg (106 lb; 7.6 st)	48–52 kg (106–115 lb; 7.6–8.2 st)	52–57 kg (115–126 lb; 8.2–9.0 st)	57–63 kg (126–139 lb; 9.0–9.9 st)	63–70 kg (139–154 lb; 9.9–11.0 st)	70–78 kg (154–172 lb; 11.0–12.3 st)	Over 78 kg (172 lb; 12.3 st)		
