= 2019 World Judo Championships – Women's 70 kg =

Judo competition

Judo Women's 70 kg at the 2019 World Judo Championships
- Venue: Nippon Budokan
- Location: Tokyo, Japan
- Date: 29 August
- Competitors: 47 from 40 nations
- Total prize money: 57,000$

Medalists
gold medal	Marie-Ève Gahié (1st title)	France
silver medal	Bárbara Timo	Portugal
bronze medal	Sally Conway	Great Britain
bronze medal	Margaux Pinot	France

Competition at external databases
- Links: IJF • JudoInside

The Women's 70 kg competition at the 2019 World Judo Championships was held on 29 August 2019.

== Results ==
=== Finals ===
Semi-finals
(Portugal) Bárbara Timo	10
(France) Margaux Pinot	00
(France) Marie-Ève Gahié	10
(United Kingdom) Sally Conway	00

Final
(Portugal) Bárbara Timo	00
(France) Marie-Ève Gahié	10

=== Repechage ===
Repechage
(Netherlands) Sanne van Dijke	00
(Austria) Michaela Polleres	11

Third place
(Austria) Michaela Polleres	01
(United Kingdom) Sally Conway	10

Repechage
(Puerto Rico) María Pérez	00
(Sweden) Anna Bernholm	10

Third place
(Sweden) Anna Bernholm	00
(France) Margaux Pinot	10

=== Pool A ===
First round
(Jamaica) Ebony Drysdale Daley	00
(Morocco) Assmaa Niang	11
(Portugal) Bárbara Timo	11
(Mongolia) Tserendulam Enkhchimeg	00
(Cuba) Onix Cortés	10
(Thailand) Surattana Thongsri	00
(Australia) Aoife Coughlan	01
(Azerbaijan) Gunel Hasanli	00

Second round
(Japan) Chizuru Arai	10
(Morocco) Assmaa Niang	00
(Portugal) Bárbara Timo	10
(Belgium) Roxane Taeymans	00
(Netherlands) Sanne van Dijke	10
(Cuba) Onix Cortés	00
(Cameroon) Ayuk Arrey	00
(Australia) Aoife Coughlan	10

Third round
(Japan) Chizuru Arai	00
(Portugal) Bárbara Timo	01
(Netherlands) Sanne van Dijke	10
(Australia) Aoife Coughlan	00

Quarterfinals
(Portugal) Bárbara Timo	10
(Netherlands) Sanne van Dijke	00

=== Pool B ===
First round
(Gabon) Karene Agono	00
(Republic of Ireland) Megan Fletcher	10
(Germany) Alina Böhm	00
(Croatia) Barbara Matić	10
(Kenya) Dianah Kana	00
(France) Margaux Pinot	10

Second round
(Austria) Michaela Polleres	10
(Republic of Ireland) Megan Fletcher	00
(Poland) Daria Pogorzelec	00
(Spain) María Bernabéu	10
(Brazil) Maria Portela	10
(Croatia) Barbara Matić	00
(France) Margaux Pinot	10
(United Kingdom) Gemma Howell	00

Third round
(Austria) Michaela Polleres	10
(Spain) María Bernabéu	00
(Brazil) Maria Portela	00
(France) Margaux Pinot	01

Quarterfinals
(Austria) Michaela Polleres	00
(France) Margaux Pinot	01

=== Pool C ===
First round
(Chad) Demos Memneloum	00
(Greece) Elisavet Teltsidou	10
(South Korea) You Je-young	01
(Italy) Alice Bellandi	00
(Belgium) Gabriella Willems	10
(India) Garima Choudhary	00
(Chinese Taipei) Shang Liu-yu	00
(China) Sun Xiaoqian	10

Second round
(France) Marie-Ève Gahié	10
(Greece) Elisavet Teltsidou	00
(Philippines) Mariya Takahashi	00
(South Korea) You Je-young	01
(Puerto Rico) María Pérez	10
(Belgium) Gabriella Willems	00
(China) Sun Xiaoqian	00
(Netherlands) Kim Polling	10

Third round
(France) Marie-Ève Gahié	10
(South Korea) You Je-young	00
(Puerto Rico) María Pérez	10
(Netherlands) Kim Polling	00

Quarterfinals
(France) Marie-Ève Gahié	01
(Puerto Rico) María Pérez	00

=== Pool D ===
First round
(Venezuela) Elvismar Rodríguez	10
(Spain) Sara Rodríguez	00
(Colombia) Yuri Alvear	10
(Kazakhstan) Moldir Narynova	00
(Tunisia) Nihel Landolsi	00
(Uzbekistan) Gulnoza Matniyazova	10
(Poland) Eliza Wróblewska	00
(Germany) Giovanna Scoccimarro	10

Second round
(Sweden) Anna Bernholm	10
(Venezuela) Elvismar Rodríguez	00
(Colombia) Yuri Alvear	10
(Fiji) Shanice Takayawa	00
(United Kingdom) Sally Conway	11
(Uzbekistan) Gulnoza Matniyazova	00
(Germany) Giovanna Scoccimarro	10
(Denmark) Emilie Sook	00

Third round
(Sweden) Anna Bernholm	11
(Colombia) Yuri Alvear	00
(United Kingdom) Sally Conway	10
(Germany) Giovanna Scoccimarro	01

Quarterfinals
(Sweden) Anna Bernholm	00
(United Kingdom) Sally Conway	01

== Prize money ==
The sums listed bring the total prizes awarded to 57,000$ for the individual event.

Medal	Total	Judoka	Coach
Gold	26,000$	20,800$	5,200$
Silver	15,000$	12,000$	3,000$
Bronze	8,000$	6,400$	1,600$
