= 2017 World Judo Championships – Women's 70 kg =

Judo Women's 70 kg at the 2017 World Judo Championships
- Venue: László Papp Budapest Sports Arena
- Location: Budapest, Hungary
- Dates: 1 September
- Competitors: 44 from 35 nations
- Total prize money: 57,000$

Medalists
gold medal	Chizuru Arai (1st title)	Japan
silver medal	María Pérez	Puerto Rico
bronze medal	Yuri Alvear	Colombia
bronze medal	María Bernabéu	Spain

Competition at external databases
- Links: IJF • JudoInside

The Women's 70 kg competition at the 2017 World Judo Championships was held on 1 September 2017.

== Results ==
=== Finals ===
Semi-finals
(Morocco) Assmaa Niang	00
(Puerto Rico) María Pérez	01
(Japan) Chizuru Arai	01
(Colombia) Yuri Alvear	00

Final
(Puerto Rico) María Pérez	00
(Japan) Chizuru Arai	10

=== Repechage ===
Repechage
(North Korea) Kwon Sun-yong	00
(France) Marie-Ève Gahié	01

Third place
(France) Marie-Ève Gahié	01
(Colombia) Yuri Alvear	10

Repechage
(Brazil) Maria Portela	00
(Spain) María Bernabéu	01

Third place
(Spain) María Bernabéu	11
(Morocco) Assmaa Niang	00

=== Pool A ===
First round
(United States) Chantal Wright	00
(North Korea) Kwon Sun-yong	12
(Montenegro) Jovana Peković	10
(Cameroon) Ayuk Arrey	00

Second round
(Venezuela) Elvismar Rodríguez	00
(North Korea) Kwon Sun-yong	01
(Belgium) Roxane Taeymans	02
(Montenegro) Jovana Peković	01
(South Korea) Kim Seong-yeon	10
(Germany) Lisa Dollinger	00
(Morocco) Assmaa Niang	11
(Algeria) Souad Bellakehal	00

Third round
(North Korea) Kwon Sun-yong	11
(Belgium) Roxane Taeymans	00
(South Korea) Kim Seong-yeon	00
(Morocco) Assmaa Niang	11

Quarterfinals
(North Korea) Kwon Sun-yong	00
(Morocco) Assmaa Niang	01

=== Pool B ===
First round
(Greece) Elisavet Teltsidou	00
(United Kingdom) Sally Conway	11
(Denmark) Emilie Sook	00
(Puerto Rico) María Pérez	10
(Kazakhstan) Zere Bektaskyzy	00
(Hungary) Szabina Gercsák	04

Second round
(Netherlands) Sanne van Dijke	00
(United Kingdom) Sally Conway	12
(Spain) Sara Rodríguez	00
(Puerto Rico) María Pérez	01
(France) Marie-Ève Gahié	10
(Hungary) Szabina Gercsák	00
(Kenya) Dianah Kana	00
(Bosnia and Herzegovina) Aleksandra Samardžić	11

Third round
(United Kingdom) Sally Conway	00
(Puerto Rico) María Pérez	10
(France) Marie-Ève Gahié	01
(Bosnia and Herzegovina) Aleksandra Samardžić	00

Quarterfinals
(Puerto Rico) María Pérez	02
(France) Marie-Ève Gahié	01

=== Pool C ===
First round
(Belgium) Lola Mansour	00
(Sweden) Anna Bernholm	01
(Germany) Szaundra Diedrich	00
(South Korea) Jeong Hye-jin	01
(United States) Nicole Stout	01
(North Korea) Kim Jong-hyang	11

Second round
(Japan) Chizuru Arai	01
(Sweden) Anna Bernholm	00
(Luxembourg) Lynn Mossong	00
(Slovenia) Anka Pogačnik	02
(Brazil) Maria Portela	02
(South Korea) Jeong Hye-jin	01
(United Kingdom) Gemma Howell	10
(North Korea) Kim Jong-hyang	00

Third round
(Japan) Chizuru Arai	01
(Slovenia) Anka Pogačnik	00
(Brazil) Maria Portela	01
(United Kingdom) Gemma Howell	00

Quarterfinals
(Japan) Chizuru Arai	00
(Brazil) Maria Portela	00

=== Pool D ===
First round
(Mongolia) Naranjargal Tsend-Ayush	00
(Canada) Kelita Zupancic	11
(Spain) María Bernabéu	01
(Israel) Linda Bolder	00
(Nigeria) Winnie Gofit	10
(Georgia (country)) Nino Odzelashvili	01

Second round
(Colombia) Yuri Alvear	01
(Canada) Kelita Zupancic	00
(China) Yan Zi	01
(Netherlands) Kim Polling	13
(Croatia) Barbara Matić	00
(Spain) María Bernabéu	01
(Russia) Alena Prokopenko	10
(Nigeria) Winnie Gofit	00

Third round
(Colombia) Yuri Alvear	11
(Netherlands) Kim Polling	00
(Spain) María Bernabéu	10
(Russia) Alena Prokopenko	01

Quarterfinals
(Colombia) Yuri Alvear	11
(Spain) María Bernabéu	00

== Prize money ==
The sums listed bring the total prizes awarded to 57,000$ for the individual event.

Medal	Total	Judoka	Coach
Gold	26,000$	20,800$	5,200$
Silver	15,000$	12,000$	3,000$
Bronze	8,000$	6,400$	1,600$
