= Judo at the 2019 European Games – Women's 70 kg =

Judo competition

Judo Women's 70 kg at the 2019 European Games
- Venue: Čyžoŭka-Arena
- Location: Minsk, Belarus
- Date: 23 June
- Competitors: 28 from 20 nations

Medalists
gold medal	Margaux Pinot (1st title)	France
silver medal	Sanne van Dijke	Netherlands
bronze medal	Barbara Matić	Croatia
bronze medal	Anna Bernholm	Sweden

Competition at external databases
- Links: IJF • JudoInside

The women's 70 kg judo event at the 2019 European Games in Minsk was held on 23 June at the Čyžoŭka-Arena.

== Results ==
=== Final ===
Final
Sanne van Dijke (NED)	00
Margaux Pinot (FRA)	10

=== Repechage ===
Repechage
Barbara Matić (CRO)	11
Megan Fletcher (IRL)	00

Third place
Barbara Matić (CRO)	10
Daria Pogorzelec (POL)	01

Repechage
Anna Bernholm (SWE)	10
Michaela Polleres (AUT)	00

Third place
Anna Bernholm (SWE)	10
Marie-Ève Gahié (FRA)	00

=== Top half ===
Round of 32
Alice Bellandi (ITA)	01
Viktoryia Novikava (BLR)	00
Miriam Butkereit (GER)	00
Elisavet Teltsidou (GRE)	11
Barbara Matić (CRO)	10
Roxane Taeymans (BEL)	00
Megan Fletcher (IRL)	10
Sara Rodríguez (ESP)	00
Sanne van Dijke (NED)	10
Alena Prokopenko (RUS)	00
Aleksandra Samardžić (BIH)	01
Yarden Mayersohn (ISR)	00

Round of 16
Marie-Ève Gahié (FRA)	10
Alice Bellandi (ITA)	00
Elisavet Teltsidou (GRE)	00
Barbara Matić (CRO)	10
Sally Conway (GBR)	00
Megan Fletcher (IRL)	01
Sanne van Dijke (NED)	10
Aleksandra Samardžić (BIH)	01

Quarterfinals
Marie-Ève Gahié (FRA)	11
Barbara Matić (CRO)	00
Megan Fletcher (IRL)	00
Sanne van Dijke (NED)	11

Semifinals
Marie-Ève Gahié (FRA)	00
Sanne van Dijke (NED)	01

=== Bottom half ===
Round of 32
Laura Vargas Koch (GER)	00
Kim Polling (NED)	11
Margaux Pinot (FRA)	10
Anka Pogačnik (SLO)	00
Gemma Howell (GBR)	11
Zhanna Asipovich (BLR)	00
Bárbara Timo (POR)	01
Gabriella Willems (BEL)	00
María Bernabéu (ESP)	00
Carola Paissoni (ITA)	10
Daria Pogorzelec (POL)	10
Emilie Sook (DEN)	00

Round of 16
Anna Bernholm (SWE)	10
Kim Polling (NED)	00
Margaux Pinot (FRA)	10
Gemma Howell (GBR)	00
Michaela Polleres (AUT)	01
Bárbara Timo (POR)	00
Carola Paissoni (ITA)	00
Daria Pogorzelec (POL)	10

Quarterfinals
Anna Bernholm (SWE)	00
Margaux Pinot (FRA)	10
Michaela Polleres (AUT)	01
Daria Pogorzelec (POL)	11

Semifinals
Margaux Pinot (FRA)	10
Daria Pogorzelec (POL)	00
