= 2021 European Judo Championships – Women's 70 kg =

Judo Women's 70 kg at the 2021 European Judo Championships
- Venue: Altice Arena
- Location: Lisbon, Portugal
- Date: 17 April
- Competitors: 18 from 16 nations

Medalists
gold medal	Sanne van Dijke (2nd title)	Netherlands
silver medal	Margaux Pinot	France
bronze medal	Madina Taimazova	Russia
bronze medal	Bárbara Timo	Portugal

Competition at external databases
- Links: IJF • JudoInside

The women's 70 kg competition at the 2021 European Judo Championships was held on 17 April at the Altice Arena.

== Results ==
=== Final ===
Final
Sanne van Dijke (NED)	10
Margaux Pinot (FRA)	00

=== Repechage ===
Repechage
Madina Taimazova (RUS)	01
Anka Pogačnik (SLO)	00

Third place
Madina Taimazova (RUS)	10
Kim Polling (NED)	00

Repechage
María Bernabéu (ESP)	00
Bárbara Timo (POR)	11

Third place
Bárbara Timo (POR)	10
Lara Cvjetko (CRO)	00

=== Top half ===
Round of 32
Katarzyna Sobierajska (POL)	01
Lara Cvjetko (CRO)	11

Round of 16
Marie-Ève Gahié (FRA)	00
Lara Cvjetko (CRO)	01
Madina Taimazova (RUS)	01
Megan Fletcher (IRL)	00
Sanne van Dijke (NED)	11
Minel Akdeniz (TUR)	00
Michaela Polleres (AUT)	00
Anka Pogačnik (SLO)	10

Quarterfinals
Lara Cvjetko (CRO)	01
Madina Taimazova (RUS)	00
Sanne van Dijke (NED)	10
Anka Pogačnik (SLO)	00

Semifinals
Lara Cvjetko (CRO)	00
Sanne van Dijke (NED)	01

=== Bottom half ===
Round of 32
Elisavet Teltsidou (GRE)	00
Szabina Gercsák (HUN)	10

Round of 16
Margaux Pinot (FRA)	11
Serafima Moscalu (ROU)	00
María Bernabéu (ESP)	10
Yelyzaveta Lytvynenko (UKR)	00
Kim Polling (NED)	10
Mariam Tchanturia (GEO)	00
Bárbara Timo (POR)	01
Szabina Gercsák (HUN)	00

Quarterfinals
Margaux Pinot (FRA)	11
María Bernabéu (ESP)	00
Kim Polling (NED)	10
Bárbara Timo (POR)	00

Semifinals
Margaux Pinot (FRA)	10
Kim Polling (NED)	00
