= 2018 European Judo Championships – Women's 70 kg =

Judo competition

Judo Women's 70 kg at the 2018 European Judo Championships
- Venue: Expo Tel Aviv
- Location: Tel Aviv, Israel
- Date: 27 April

Medalists
gold medal	Kim Polling (4th title)	Netherlands
silver medal	Sally Conway	Great Britain
bronze medal	Michaela Polleres	Austria
bronze medal	Gemma Howell	Great Britain

Competition at external databases
- Links: IJF • JudoInside

The women's 70 kg competition at the 2018 European Judo Championships was held on 27 April at the Expo Tel Aviv.

== Results ==
=== Finals ===
Semi-finals
Gemma Howell (GBR)	01
Kim Polling (NED)	11
Barbara Matić (CRO)	00
Sally Conway (GBR)	10

Final
Kim Polling (NED)	10
Sally Conway (GBR)	01

=== Repechage ===
Repechage
Michaela Polleres (AUT)	10
Sanne van Dijke (NED)	00

Third place
Michaela Polleres (AUT)	01
Barbara Matić (CRO)	00

Repechage
María Bernabéu (ESP)	10
Anka Pogačnik (SLO)	00

Third place
María Bernabéu (ESP)	00
Gemma Howell (GBR)	10

=== Pool A ===
First round
Roxane Taeymans (BEL)	00
Michaela Polleres (AUT)	10

Round of 16
Marie-Ève Gahié (FRA)	00
Michaela Polleres (AUT)	10
Aleksandra Samardzic (BIH)	00
Gemma Howell (GBR)	10

Quarterfinals
Michaela Polleres (AUT)	00
Gemma Howell (GBR)	10

=== Pool B ===
First round
Jovana Peković (MNE)	10
Emilie Sook (DEN)	00

Round of 16
Sanne van Dijke (NED)
Carola Paissoni (ITA)
Kim Polling (NED)	10
Jovana Peković (MNE)	01

Quarterfinals
Sanne van Dijke (NED)	00
Kim Polling (NED)	10

=== Pool C ===
First round
Giovanna Scoccimarro (GER)	00
Megan Fletcher (IRL)	10
Szabina Gercsák (HUN)	00
Daria Pogorzelec (POL)	10

Round of 16
Barbara Matić (CRO)	01
Megan Fletcher (IRL)	00
María Bernabéu (ESP)	10
Daria Pogorzelec (POL)	00

Quarterfinals
Barbara Matić (CRO)	10
María Bernabéu (ESP)	00

=== Pool D ===
First round
Gabriella Willems (BEL)	01
Alina Lengweiler (SUI)	00

Round of 16
Anna Bernholm (SWE)	00
Anka Pogačnik (SLO)	10
Sally Conway (GBR)	11
Gabriella Willems (BEL)	00

Quarterfinals
Anka Pogačnik (SLO)	00
Sally Conway (GBR)	11
