= 2026 European Judo Championships – Women's 70 kg =

Judo competition

Judo Women's 70 kg at the 2026 European Judo Championships
- Venue: Olympic Palace
- Location: Tbilisi, Georgia
- Date: 18 April 2026
- Competitors: 36 from 26 nations

Medalists
| gold medal | Szofi Özbas (2nd title) | Hungary |
| silver medal | Melkia Auchecorne | France |
| bronze medal | April Lynn Fohouo | Switzerland |
| bronze medal | Madina Taimazova | Russia |

Competition at external databases
- Links: IJF • JudoInside

The women's 70 kg event at the 2026 European Judo Championships was held at the Olympic Palace in Tbilisi, Georgia on 18 April 2026.

== Results ==
=== Finals ===
Semi-finals
(Russia) Madina Taimazova | 000
(France) Melkia Auchecorne | 001 (yellow card)
(Hungary) Szofi Özbas | 020
(Switzerland) April Lynn Fohouo | 000 (yellow card)

Final
(France) Melkia Auchecorne | 000
(Hungary) Szofi Özbas | 100

=== Repechage ===
Repechage
(Croatia) Lara Cvjetko | 100 (yellow card)
(Spain) Ai Tsunoda | 000
(Greece) Elisavet Teltsidou | 100
(Sweden) Ida Eriksson | 000

Bronze medal
(Croatia) Lara Cvjetko | 001
(Switzerland) April Lynn Fohouo | 101 (yellow card)
(Greece) Elisavet Teltsidou | 000
(Russia) Madina Taimazova | 020 (yellow card)

=== Pool A ===
First round
(Georgia (country)) Nino Gulbani | 100
(Germany) Samira Bock | 000

Round of 32
(Croatia) Lara Cvjetko | 100
(Lithuania) Ugnė Pileckaitė | 000
(Serbia) Aleksandra Andrić | 021
(Sweden) Ingrid Nilsson | 000
(Italy) Irene Pedrotti | 100 (yellow card)
(Georgia (country)) Nino Gulbani | 000
(Russia) Madina Taimazova | 001 (yellow card)
(Austria) Michaela Polleres | 000

Round of 16
(Croatia) Lara Cvjetko | 001 (yellow card)
(Serbia) Aleksandra Andrić | 000 (yellow card)
(Italy) Irene Pedrotti | 000 (yellow card)
(Russia) Madina Taimazova | 001 (yellow card)

Quarter-finals
(Croatia) Lara Cvjetko | 001
(Russia) Madina Taimazova | 010 (yellow card)

=== Pool B ===
First round
(Poland) Aleksandra Kowalewska | 010
(Czech Republic) Lucie Zárybnická | 000

Round of 32
(Spain) Ai Tsunoda | 100
(Bosnia and Herzegovina) Aleksandra Samardžić | 000 (yellow card)
(Poland) Aleksandra Kowalewska | 001 (yellow card)
(Switzerland) Gioia Vetterli | 101
(Italy) Giorgia Stangherlin | 001 (yellow card)
(Ukraine) Olha Tsimko | 000 (yellow card)
(France) Melkia Auchecorne | 001
(Netherlands) Sanne van Dijke | 000 (yellow card)

Round of 16
(Spain) Ai Tsunoda | 100
(Switzerland) Gioia Vetterli | 000 (yellow card)
(Italy) Giorgia Stangherlin | 001
(France) Melkia Auchecorne | 010

Quarter-finals
(Spain) Ai Tsunoda | 000
(France) Melkia Auchecorne | 001

=== Pool C ===
First round
(Israel) Maya Goshen | 000
(Azerbaijan) Sudaba Aghayeva | 001

Round of 32
(Hungary) Szofi Özbas | 010
(Georgia (country)) Mariam Tchanturia | 000
(Azerbaijan) Sudaba Aghayeva | 001 (yellow card)
(United Kingdom) Kelly Petersen Pollard | 000
(Greece) Elisavet Teltsidou | 100
(Bulgaria) Nadie Jaafar | 000
(Netherlands) Margit de Voogd | 001
(Poland) Katarzyna Sobierajska | 000 (yellow card)

Round of 16
(Hungary) Szofi Özbas | 100
(Azerbaijan) Sudaba Aghayeva | 000
(Greece) Elisavet Teltsidou | 001 (yellow card)
(Netherlands) Margit de Voogd | 000 (yellow card)

Quarter-finals
(Hungary) Szofi Özbas | 100
(Greece) Elisavet Teltsidou | 000 (yellow card)

=== Pool D ===
First round

Round of 32
(Sweden) Ida Eriksson | 100
(Serbia) Jovana Čakarević | 000
(Czech Republic) Anna Skalská | 001 (yellow card)
(Slovenia) Nika Koren | 000
(Switzerland) April Lynn Fohouo | 002
(Germany) Dena Pohl | 000
(Portugal) Bárbara Timo | 100
(Turkey) Sinem Oruç | 000

Round of 16
(Sweden) Ida Eriksson | 100 (yellow card)
(Czech Republic) Anna Skalská | 000 (yellow card)
(Switzerland) April Lynn Fohouo | 001 (yellow card)
(Portugal) Bárbara Timo | 000

Quarter-finals
(Sweden) Ida Eriksson | 000 (yellow card)
(Switzerland) April Lynn Fohouo | 001 (yellow card)
