= Judo at the 2019 European Games – Mixed team =

Judo Mixed team at the 2019 European Games
- Venue: Čyžoŭka-Arena
- Location: Minsk, Belarus
- Date: 25 June
- Nations: 16

Medalists
gold medal	Aleksandra Babintseva; Ksenia Chibisova; Daria Davydova; Khusen Khalmurzaev; Alan Khubetsov; Anastasiia Konkina; Daria Mezhetskaia; Musa Mogushkov; Alena Prokopenko; Inal Tasoev; Denis Yartsev; Kazbek Zankishiev	Russia
silver medal	Anri Egutidze; Jorge Fernandes; Jorge Fonseca; Telma Monteiro; Rochele Nunes; Joana Ramos; Tiago Rodrigues; Patricia Sampaio; Nuno Saraiva; Bárbara Timo	Portugal
bronze medal	Amandine Buchard; Guillaume Chaine; Axel Clerget; Aurelien Diesse; Marie-Ève Gahié; Priscilla Gneto; Kilian Le Blouch; Madeleine Malonga; Cyrille Maret; Anne Fatoumata M'Bairo; Margaux Pinot	France
bronze medal	Daniel Allerstorfer; Shamil Borchashvili; Marko Bubanja; Sabrina Filzmoser; Bernadette Graf; Stephan Hegyi; Magdalena Krssakova; Michaela Polleres; Lukas Reiter; Katharina Tanzer	Austria

Champions
- Mixed team: Russia (1st title)

Competition at external databases
- Links: JudoInside

The mixed team judo event at the 2019 European Games in Minsk, serving as the European Mixed Team Judo Championships, was held on 25 June at the Čyžoŭka-Arena.

== Results ==
Round of 16
France	4
Azerbaijan	0
Portugal	4
Spain	2
Netherlands	4
Romania	1
Slovenia	4
Ukraine	3
Russia	4
Turkey	0
Poland	3
Serbia	4
Germany	2
Austria	4
Hungary	2
Belarus	4

Quarter-finals
France	3
Portugal	4
Netherlands	4
Slovenia	1
Russia	4
Serbia	0
Austria	1
Belarus	4

Semi-finals
Portugal	4
Netherlands	2
Russia	4
Belarus	2

Final
Portugal	3
Russia	4

=== Repechage ===
Repechage
France	4
Slovenia	1
Serbia	1
Austria	4

Bronze medal
France	4
Belarus	1
Austria	4
Netherlands	2
