= 2017 European Judo Championships – Women's 70 kg =

Judo competition

Judo Women's 70 kg at the 2017 European Judo Championships
- Venue: Torwar Hall
- Location: Warsaw, Poland
- Date: April 21, 2017
- Competitors: 22 from 18 nations

Medalists
gold medal	Sanne van Dijke (1st title)	Netherlands
silver medal	Giovanna Scoccimarro	Germany
bronze medal	Barbara Matić	Croatia
bronze medal	Marie-Eve Gahié	France

Competition at external databases
- Links: IJF • JudoInside

The women's 70 kg competition at the 2017 European Judo Championships in Warsaw was held on 21 April at the Torwar Hall.

== Results ==
=== Finals ===
Semi-finals
Marie-Eve Gahié (FRA)	000
Sanne van Dijke (NED)	120
Barbara Matić (CRO)	000
Giovanna Scoccimarro (GER)	110

Final
Sanne van Dijke (NED)	020
Giovanna Scoccimarro (GER)	000

=== Repechages ===
Repechage		Bronze medal
Anna Bernholm (SWE)	100
Szabina Gercsák (HUN)	000	Anna Bernholm (SWE)	000
		Barbara Matić (CRO)	100

Repechage		Bronze medal
Katarzyna Kłys (POL)	010
Aleksandra Samardžić (BIH)	000	Katarzyna Kłys (POL)	000
		Marie-Eve Gahié (FRA)	110

=== Pool A ===
First round		Second round		Quarterfinals
		Marie-Eve Gahié (FRA)	120
Carola Paissoni (ITA)	000	Lola Mansour (BEL)	000
Lola Mansour (BEL)	000			Marie-Eve Gahié (FRA)	110
				Anna Bernholm (SWE)	000
		Anna Bernholm (SWE)	020
		Sara Rodríguez (ESP)	010

=== Pool B ===
First round
Szaundra Diedrich (GER)	'010
Büşra Katipoğlu (TUR)	000
Victoria Bolohan (MDA)	020
Michaela Polleres (AUT)	120

Second round
Szabina Gercsák (HUN)	100
Szaundra Diedrich (GER)	000
Sanne van Dijke (NED)	120
Michaela Polleres (AUT)	000

Quarterfinals
Szabina Gercsák (HUN)	000
Sanne van Dijke (NED)	010

=== Pool C ===
First round
Jovana Peković (MNE)	100
Elisavet Teltsidou (GRE)	010
Natascha Ausma (NED)	010
Gabriella Willems (BEL)	000

Second round
Barbara Matić (CRO)	110
Jovana Peković (MNE)	000
Katarzyna Kłys (POL)	100
Natascha Ausma (NED)	000

Quarterfinals
Barbara Matić (CRO)	010
Katarzyna Kłys (POL)	000

=== Pool D ===
First round		Second round		Quarterfinals
		Anka Pogačnik (SLO)	000
Giovanna Scoccimarro (GER)	100	Giovanna Scoccimarro (GER)	110
Şükran Bakacak (TUR)	000			Giovanna Scoccimarro (GER)	120
				Aleksandra Samardžić (BIH)	000
		Aleksandra Samardžić (BIH)	100
		Loriana Kuka (KOS)	000
