= 2020 European Judo Championships – Women's 70 kg =

Judo competition

Judo Women's 70 kg at the 2020 European Judo Championships
- Venue: O2 Arena
- Location: Prague, Czech Republic
- Date: 20 November
- Competitors: 23 from 18 nations

Medalists
gold medal	Margaux Pinot (2nd title)	France
silver medal	Sanne van Dijke	Netherlands
bronze medal	Madina Taimazova	Russia
bronze medal	Marie-Ève Gahié	France

Competition at external databases
- Links: IJF • JudoInside

The women's 70 kg competition at the 2020 European Judo Championships was held on 20 November at the O2 Arena.

== Results ==
=== Final ===
Final
Sanne van Dijke (NED)	00
Margaux Pinot (FRA)	10

=== Repechage ===
Repechage
Joana Crisóstomo (POR)	00
Madina Taimazova (RUS)	10

Third place
Madina Taimazova (RUS)	01
Alice Bellandi (ITA)	00

Repechage
Miriam Butkereit (GER)	10
Anka Pogačnik (SLO)	00

Third place
Miriam Butkereit (GER)	00
Marie-Ève Gahié (FRA)	10

=== Top half ===
Round of 32
Ugnė Pileckaitė (LTU)	00
Joana Crisóstomo (POR)	10
Serafima Moscalu (ROU)	10
Gabriella Willems (BEL)	00
Alina Lengweiler (SUI)	00
Madina Taimazova (RUS)	10

Round of 16
Marie-Ève Gahié (FRA)	10
Barbara Matić (CRO)	00
Megan Fletcher (IRL)	00
Joana Crisóstomo (POR)	10
Sanne van Dijke (NED)	10
Serafima Moscalu (ROU)	00
Giovanna Scoccimarro (GER)	00
Madina Taimazova (RUS)	10

Quarterfinals
Marie-Ève Gahié (FRA)	10
Joana Crisóstomo (POR)	00
Sanne van Dijke (NED)	10
Madina Taimazova (RUS)	00

Semifinals
Marie-Ève Gahié (FRA)	00
Sanne van Dijke (NED)	10

=== Bottom half ===
Round of 32
Elisavet Teltsidou (GRE)	10
Roxane Taeymans (BEL)	00
Aleksandra Samardžić (BIH)	00
Alena Prokopenko (RUS)	10
Anka Pogačnik (SLO)	10
Katarzyna Sobierajska (POL)	00
Ai Tsunoda (ESP)	00
Alice Bellandi (ITA)	10

Round of 16
Margaux Pinot (FRA)	10
Elisavet Teltsidou (GRE)	00
Miriam Butkereit (GER)	10
Alena Prokopenko (RUS)	00
Michaela Polleres (AUT)	00
Anka Pogačnik (SLO)	01
Bárbara Timo (POR)	00
Alice Bellandi (ITA)	10

Quarterfinals
Margaux Pinot (FRA)	01
Miriam Butkereit (GER)	00
Anka Pogačnik (SLO)	00
Alice Bellandi (ITA)	01

Semifinals
Margaux Pinot (FRA)	01
Alice Bellandi (ITA)	00
