= Alexandre Iddir =

French judoka (born 1991)

Personal information
- Nationality: French
- Born: 21 February 1991 (age 35) Villepinte, France
- Occupation: Judoka
- Height: 1.84 m (6 ft 0 in)

Sport
- Country: France
- Sport: Judo
- Weight class: –100 kg

Achievements and titles
- Olympic Games: 7th (2016)
- World Champ.: 7th (2021)
- European Champ.: (bronze) (2014, 2021)
Medal record
Men's judo
Representing France
Olympic Games
Gold medal – first place	2020 Tokyo	Mixed team
European Championships
Bronze medal – third place	2014 Montpellier	‍–‍90 kg
Bronze medal – third place	2021 Lisbon	‍–‍100 kg
IJF Grand Slam
Silver medal – second place	2015 Paris	‍–‍90 kg
Silver medal – second place	2016 Paris	‍–‍90 kg
IJF Grand Prix
Gold medal – first place	2014 Tashkent	‍–‍90 kg
Gold medal – first place	2019 Tel Aviv	‍–‍100 kg
Gold medal – first place	2019 Antalya	‍–‍100 kg
Gold medal – first place	2019 Perth	‍–‍100 kg
Silver medal – second place	2018 Tashkent	‍–‍100 kg
Silver medal – second place	2019 Zagreb	‍–‍100 kg
Bronze medal – third place	2014 Samsun	‍–‍90 kg
Bronze medal – third place	2014 Astana	‍–‍90 kg
Bronze medal – third place	2015 Qingdao	‍–‍90 kg
European U23 Championships
Bronze medal – third place	2013 Samokov	‍–‍90 kg

Profile at external databases
- IJF: 3283
- JudoInside.com: 56868
- Updated on 21 May 2023

Alexandre Iddir (born 21 February 1991) is a French judoka. He represented his country at the 2016 Summer Olympics.
