= Judo at the 2014 Commonwealth Games – Women's 70 kg =

Judo Judo – Women's 70 kg at the 2014 Commonwealth Games
- Venue: Scottish Exhibition and Conference Centre
- Date: 25 July 2014
- Competitors: 10 from 8 nations

Medalists
gold medal	Megan Fletcher	England
silver medal	Moira de Villiers	New Zealand
bronze medal	Sally Conway	Scotland
bronze medal	Alix Renaud-Roy	Canada

The women's 70 kg Judo competitions at the 2014 Commonwealth Games in Glasgow, Scotland was held on 25 July at the Scottish Exhibition and Conference Centre. Judo returned to the program, after last being competed back in 2002.

== Results ==
=== Repechages ===
Repechage		Bronze medal
Sara Collins (AUS)	0000
Alix Renaud-Roy (CAN)	1000	Alix Renaud-Roy (CAN)	1000
		Catherine Arscott (AUS)	0000

Repechage		Bronze medal
		S Conway (SCO)	0000
Monica Burgess (CAN)	0002	Sunibala Huidrom (IND)	0003
Sunibala Huidrom (IND)	0001

=== Preliminaries ===
Round of 16
F Ndanga Nana (CMR)	0001
A Renaud-Roy (CAN)	0000
S Huidrom (IND)	1100
M Zikhale (BOT)	0000

Quarterfinals
S Conway (SCO)	1000
S Collins (AUS)	0000
M Fletcher (ENG)	0001
A Renaud-Roy (CAN)	0002
M de Villiers (NZL)	1010
M Burgess (CAN)	0000
C Arscott (AUS)	0010
S Huidrom (IND)	0002

Semifinals
S Conway (SCO)	0010
M Fletcher (ENG)	–0020
M de Villiers (NZL)	0000
C Arscott (AUS)	0002

Gold medal match
M Fletcher (ENG)	1000
M de Villiers (NZL)	0000
