= Szofi Özbas =

Hungarian judoka (born 2001)

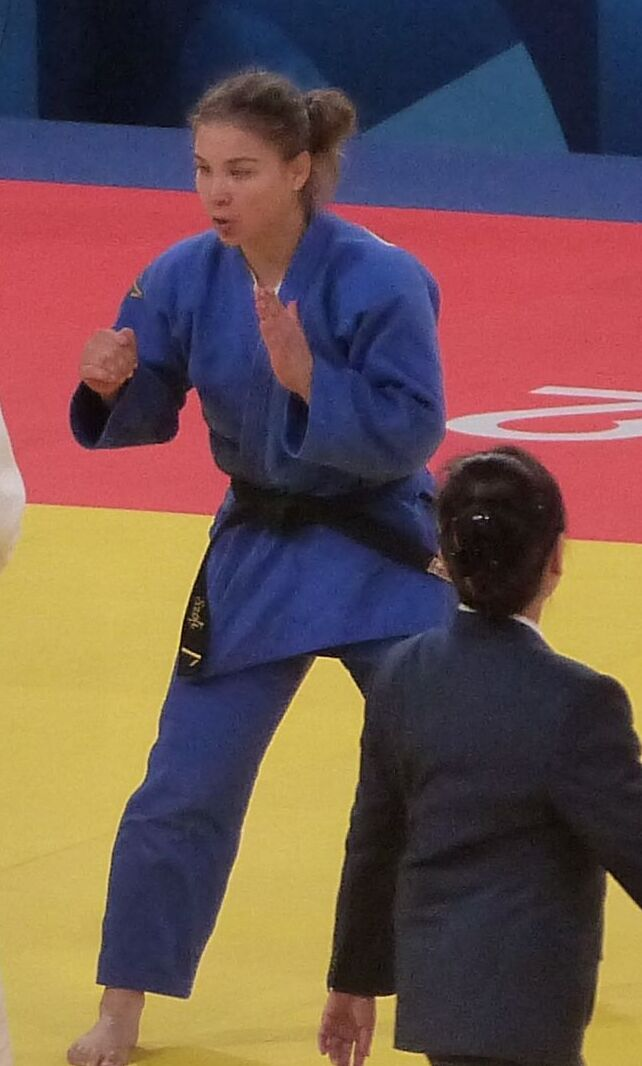

Personal information
- Born: 19 October 2001 (age 24) Szolnok, Hungary
- Occupation: Judoka

Sport
- Country: Hungary
- Sport: Judo
- Weight class: ‍–‍63 kg, ‍–‍70 kg

Achievements and titles
- Olympic Games: R16 (2020, 2024)
- World Champ.: (bronze) (2023)
- European Champ.: (gold) (2025, 2026)
- Highest world ranking: 2^{nd}
Medal record
Women's judo
Representing Hungary
World Championships
Bronze medal – third place	2023 Doha	‍–‍63 kg
European Championships
Gold medal – first place	2025 Podgorica	‍–‍70 kg
Gold medal – first place	2026 Tbilisi	‍–‍70 kg
Bronze medal – third place	2022 Sofia	‍–‍63 kg
IJF Grand Slam
Gold medal – first place	2025 Baku	‍–‍70 kg
Gold medal – first place	2025 Tbilisi	‍–‍70 kg
Gold medal – first place	2025 Abu Dhabi	‍–‍70 kg
Gold medal – first place	2026 Paris	‍–‍70 kg
Silver medal – second place	2022 Antalya	‍–‍63 kg
Silver medal – second place	2023 Ulaanbaatar	‍–‍63 kg
Silver medal – second place	2023 Baku	‍–‍63 kg
Bronze medal – third place	2020 Budapest	‍–‍63 kg
Bronze medal – third place	2022 Tel Aviv	‍–‍63 kg
Bronze medal – third place	2023 Tashkent	‍–‍63 kg
Bronze medal – third place	2024 Baku	‍–‍63 kg
IJF Grand Prix
Bronze medal – third place	2024 Odivelas	‍–‍63 kg
European U23 Championships
Gold medal – first place	2019 Izhevsk	‍–‍63 kg
Bronze medal – third place	2021 Budapest	‍–‍63 kg
World Juniors Championships
Gold medal – first place	2019 Marrakesh	‍–‍63 kg
European Junior Championships
Gold medal – first place	2019 Vantaa	‍–‍63 kg
World Cadets Championships
Bronze medal – third place	2017 Santiago	‍–‍52 kg
European Cadet Championships
Gold medal – first place	2017 Kaunas	‍–‍52 kg
Bronze medal – third place	2018 Sarajevo	‍–‍63 kg
Youth Olympic Games
Gold medal – first place	2018 Buenos Aires	‍–‍63 kg
European Youth Olympic Festival
Bronze medal – third place	2017 Poreč	‍–‍52 kg

Profile at external databases
- IJF: 18049
- JudoInside.com: 93993
- Updated on 18 April 2026

Szofi Özbas (born 19 October 2001) is a Hungarian judoka. She competed in the women's 63 kg event at the 2020 Summer Olympics held in Tokyo, Japan.

Özbas is the 2019 Youth World Champion in the ‍–‍63 kg class.

Özbas won one of the bronze medals in her event at the 2022 Judo Grand Slam Tel Aviv held in Tel Aviv, Israel.
