= Judo at the 2020 Summer Olympics – Women's 70 kg =

Judo competition

Women's 70 kg at the Games of the XXXII Olympiad
- Venue: Nippon Budokan
- Date: 28 July 2021
- Competitors: 28 from 28 nations

Medalists
1st place, gold medalist(s)		Chizuru Arai	Japan
2nd place, silver medalist(s)		Michaela Polleres	Austria
3rd place, bronze medalist(s)		Madina Taimazova	ROC
3rd place, bronze medalist(s)		Sanne van Dijke	Netherlands

The women's 70 kg competition in judo at the 2020 Summer Olympics in Tokyo was held on 28 July 2021 at the Nippon Budokan.

== Results ==
=== Finals ===
Semi-finals
1 Sanne van Dijke (NED)	00
5 Michaela Polleres (AUT)	01
Madina Taimazova (ROC)	00
3 Chizuru Arai (JPN)	10

Gold medal
5 Michaela Polleres (AUT)	00
3 Chizuru Arai (JPN)	01

=== Repechage ===
Repechage
Alice Bellandi (ITA)	00
4 Barbara Matić (CRO)	10

Bronze medal
Madina Taimazova (ROC)	01
4 Barbara Matić (CRO)	00

Repechage
Elisavet Teltsidou (GRE)	00
6 Giovanna Scoccimarro (GER)	10

Bronze medal
1 Sanne van Dijke (NED)	10
6 Giovanna Scoccimarro (GER)	00

=== Pool A ===
Round of 32
Demos Memneloum (CHA)	00
Gulnoza Matniyazova (UZB)	10
8 Anna Bernholm (SWE)	10
Nihel Landolsi (TUN)	00
Alice Bellandi (ITA)	01
Assmaa Niang (MAR)	00

Round of 16
1 Sanne van Dijke (NED)	10
Gulnoza Matniyazova (UZB)	00
8 Anna Bernholm (SWE)	00
Alice Bellandi (ITA)	01

Quarter-finals
1 Sanne van Dijke (NED)	11
Alice Bellandi (ITA)	01

=== Pool B ===
Round of 32
Ebony Drysdale Daley (JAM)	00
Barbara Timo (POR)	10
5 Michaela Polleres (AUT)	01
Megan Fletcher (IRL)	00
Kim Seong-yeon (KOR)	10
Ayuk Otay Arrey Sophina (CMR)	00

Round of 16
4 Barbara Matić (CRO)	10
Barbara Timo (POR)	00
5 Michaela Polleres (AUT)	01
Kim Seong-yeon (KOR)	00

Quarter-finals
4 Barbara Matić (CRO)	00
5 Michaela Polleres (AUT)	01

=== Pool C ===
Round of 32
Elisavet Teltsidou (GRE)	10
Sun Xiaoqian (CHN)	00
7 Maria Portela (BRA)	10
Nigara Shaheen (EOR)	00
María Bernabéu (ESP)	00
Madina Taimazova (ROC)	01

Round of 16
2 Margaux Pinot (FRA)	00
Elisavet Teltsidou (GRE)	10
7 Maria Portela (BRA)	00
Madina Taimazova (ROC)	10

Quarter-finals
Elisavet Teltsidou (GRE)	00
Madina Taimazova (ROC)	10

=== Pool D ===
Round of 32
María Pérez (PUR)	10
Gemma Howell (GBR)	00
6 Giovanna Scoccimarro (GER)	01
Elvismar Rodriguez (VEN)	00
Aoife Coughlan (AUS)	10
Kinaua Biribo (KIR)	00

Round of 16
3 Chizuru Arai (JPN)	10
María Pérez (PUR)	00
6 Giovanna Scoccimarro (GER)	10
Aoife Coughlan (AUS)	00

Quarter-finals
3 Chizuru Arai (JPN)	10
6 Giovanna Scoccimarro (GER)	00
