= Maria Portela =

Brazilian judoka (born 1988)

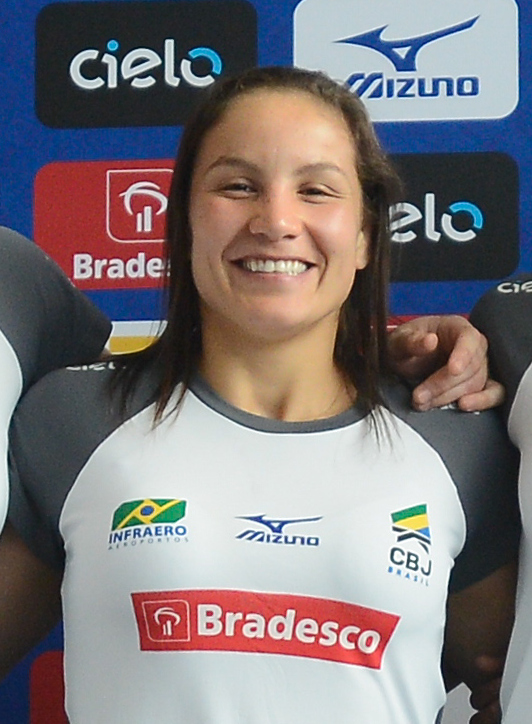
- Portela in 2016

Personal information
- Born: 14 January 1988 (age 38) Júlio de Castilhos, Brazil
- Occupation: Judoka
- Height: 158 cm (5 ft 2 in)

Sport
- Country: Brazil
- Sport: Judo
- Weight class: ‍–‍70 kg
- Club: Sogipa
- Coached by: Antônio Carlos Pereira

Achievements and titles
- Olympic Games: R16 (2016, 2020)
- World Champ.: 7th (2013, 2017, 2021)
- Pan American Champ.: (2012, 2020)
Medal record
Women's judo
Representing Brazil
World Championships
Bronze medal – third place	2021 Budapest	Mixed team
Pan American Games
Bronze medal – third place	2011 Guadalajara	‍–‍70 kg
Bronze medal – third place	2015 Toronto	‍–‍70 kg
Pan American Championships
Gold medal – first place	2012 Montreal	‍–‍70 kg
Gold medal – first place	2020 Guadalajara	‍–‍70 kg
Silver medal – second place	2009 Buenos Aires	‍–‍70 kg
Silver medal – second place	2011 Guadalajara	‍–‍70 kg
Silver medal – second place	2019 Lima	‍–‍70 kg
Bronze medal – third place	2015 Edmonton	‍–‍70 kg
Bronze medal – third place	2022 Lima	‍–‍70 kg
World Masters
Gold medal – first place	2017 Saint Petersburg	‍–‍70 kg
IJF Grand Slam
Gold medal – first place	2012 Moscow	‍–‍70 kg
Gold medal – first place	2018 Ekaterinburg	‍–‍70 kg
Gold medal – first place	2021 Tbilisi	‍–‍70 kg
Silver medal – second place	2016 Baku	‍–‍70 kg
Silver medal – second place	2016 Abu Dhabi	‍–‍70 kg
Silver medal – second place	2019 Ekaterinburg	‍–‍70 kg
Bronze medal – third place	2011 Rio de Janeiro	‍–‍70 kg
Bronze medal – third place	2015 Tokyo	‍–‍70 kg
Bronze medal – third place	2017 Abu Dhabi	‍–‍70 kg
Bronze medal – third place	2019 Brasilia	‍–‍70 kg
Bronze medal – third place	2022 Antalya	‍–‍70 kg
IJF Grand Prix
Gold medal – first place	2012 Abu Dhabi	‍–‍70 kg
Gold medal – first place	2017 Tbilisi	‍–‍70 kg
Silver medal – second place	2012 Düsseldorf	‍–‍70 kg
Silver medal – second place	2012 Qingdao	‍–‍70 kg
Silver medal – second place	2019 Antalya	‍–‍70 kg
Bronze medal – third place	2014 Ulaanbaatar	‍–‍70 kg
Bronze medal – third place	2014 Zagreb	‍–‍70 kg
Bronze medal – third place	2014 Tashkent	‍–‍70 kg
Bronze medal – third place	2016 Havana	‍–‍70 kg
Bronze medal – third place	2022 Almada	‍–‍70 kg
Military World Games
Gold medal – first place	2015 Mungyeong	Team
Silver medal – second place	2015 Mungyeong	‍–‍70 kg

Profile at external databases
- IJF: 440
- JudoInside.com: 48728
- Updated on 3 July 2022

Maria de Lourdes Mazzoleni Portela (born 14 January 1988) is a Brazilian middleweight judoka. She won bronze medals at the 2011 and 2015 Pan American Games, and competed at the 2012 and 2016 Olympics. At the 2012 Olympics, she lost her first match to Yuri Alvear. At the 2016 Games, she beat Assmaa Niang in the first round, before losing to Bernadette Graf in the second.

In 2020, she won the gold medal in the women's 70 kg event at the 2020 Pan American Judo Championships held in Guadalajara, Mexico. The following year, Portela represented Brazil at the 2020 Summer Olympics. She competed in the women's 70 kg event, being controversially eliminated in the second round against Madina Taimazova, in a ten-minute golden score overtime where one hit that would have given Portela a win was dismissed by the referees, and also was part of the mixed team competition.
