= 2020 Judo Grand Slam Hungary =

Judo competition

Judo 2020 Judo Grand Slam Hungary
- Venue: László Papp Budapest Sports Arena
- Location: Budapest, Hungary
- Dates: 23–25 October 2020
- Competitors: 409 from 61 nations

Competition at external databases
- Links: IJF • EJU • JudoInside

The 2020 Judo Grand Slam Hungary was held at the László Papp Budapest Sports Arena in Budapest, Hungary from 23 to 25 October 2020.

== Medal summary ==
=== Men's events ===
Event	Gold	Silver	Bronze
Extra-lightweight (−60 kg)	Yago Abuladze (RUS)	Robert Mshvidobadze (RUS)	Rodrigo Costa Lopes (POR)
Extra-lightweight (−60 kg)	Yago Abuladze (RUS)	Robert Mshvidobadze (RUS)	Luka Mkheidze (FRA)
Half-lightweight (−66 kg)	Abdula Abdulzhalilov (RUS)	Yakub Shamilov (RUS)	Willian Lima (BRA)
Half-lightweight (−66 kg)	Abdula Abdulzhalilov (RUS)	Yakub Shamilov (RUS)	Orkhan Safarov (AZE)
Lightweight (−73 kg)	Rustam Orujov (AZE)	Nils Stump (SUI)	Arthur Margelidon (CAN)
Lightweight (−73 kg)	Rustam Orujov (AZE)	Nils Stump (SUI)	Petru Pelivan (MDA)
Half-middleweight (−81 kg)	Vedat Albayrak (TUR)	Antoine Valois-Fortier (CAN)	Nicolas Chilard (FRA)
Half-middleweight (−81 kg)	Vedat Albayrak (TUR)	Antoine Valois-Fortier (CAN)	Saeid Mollaei (MGL)
Middleweight (−90 kg)	Mikhail Igolnikov (RUS)	Gantulgyn Altanbagana (MGL)	Mammadali Mehdiyev (AZE)
Middleweight (−90 kg)	Mikhail Igolnikov (RUS)	Gantulgyn Altanbagana (MGL)	Nikoloz Sherazadishvili (ESP)
Half-heavyweight (−100 kg)	Niyaz Ilyasov (RUS)	Arman Adamian (RUS)	Shady El Nahas (CAN)
Half-heavyweight (−100 kg)	Niyaz Ilyasov (RUS)	Arman Adamian (RUS)	Jorge Fonseca (POR)
Heavyweight (+100 kg)	Inal Tasoev (RUS)	Tamerlan Bashaev (RUS)	Gela Zaalishvili (GEO)
Heavyweight (+100 kg)	Inal Tasoev (RUS)	Tamerlan Bashaev (RUS)	Levani Matiashvili (GEO)

Source Results

=== Women's events ===
Event	Gold	Silver	Bronze
Extra-lightweight (−48 kg)	Distria Krasniqi (KOS)	Paula Pareto (ARG)	Ganbaataryn Narantsetseg (MGL)
Extra-lightweight (−48 kg)	Distria Krasniqi (KOS)	Paula Pareto (ARG)	Andrea Stojadinov (SRB)
Half-lightweight (−52 kg)	Amandine Buchard (FRA)	Fabienne Kocher (SUI)	Daria Bilodid (UKR)
Half-lightweight (−52 kg)	Amandine Buchard (FRA)	Fabienne Kocher (SUI)	Andreea Chițu (ROU)
Lightweight (−57 kg)	Jessica Klimkait (CAN)	Hélène Receveaux (FRA)	Hedvig Karakas (HUN)
Lightweight (−57 kg)	Jessica Klimkait (CAN)	Hélène Receveaux (FRA)	Timna Nelson-Levy (ISR)
Half-middleweight (−63 kg)	Tina Trstenjak (SLO)	Anriquelis Barrios (VEN)	Daria Davydova (RUS)
Half-middleweight (−63 kg)	Tina Trstenjak (SLO)	Anriquelis Barrios (VEN)	Szofi Özbas (HUN)
Middleweight (−70 kg)	Barbara Matić (CRO)	Margaux Pinot (FRA)	Michaela Polleres (AUT)
Middleweight (−70 kg)	Barbara Matić (CRO)	Margaux Pinot (FRA)	Bárbara Timo (POR)
Half-heavyweight (−78 kg)	Audrey Tcheuméo (FRA)	Fanny Estelle Posvite (FRA)	Natascha Ausma (NED)
Half-heavyweight (−78 kg)	Audrey Tcheuméo (FRA)	Fanny Estelle Posvite (FRA)	Loriana Kuka (KOS)
Heavyweight (+78 kg)	Kayra Sayit (TUR)	Nihel Cheikh Rouhou (TUN)	Maria Suelen Altheman (BRA)
Heavyweight (+78 kg)	Kayra Sayit (TUR)	Nihel Cheikh Rouhou (TUN)	Beatriz Souza (BRA)

Source Results

=== Medal table ===
* Host nation (Hungary)

Rank	Nation	Gold	Silver	Bronze	Total
1	Russia (RUS)	5	4	1	10
2	France (FRA)	2	3	2	7
3	Turkey (TUR)	2	0	0	2
4	Canada (CAN)	1	1	2	4
5	Azerbaijan (AZE)	1	0	2	3
6	Kosovo (KOS)	1	0	1	2
7	Croatia (CRO)	1	0	0	1
7	Slovenia (SLO)	1	0	0	1
9	Switzerland (SUI)	0	2	0	2
10	Mongolia (MGL)	0	1	2	3
11	Argentina (ARG)	0	1	0	1
11	Tunisia (TUN)	0	1	0	1
11	Venezuela (VEN)	0	1	0	1
14	Brazil (BRA)	0	0	3	3
14	Portugal (POR)	0	0	3	3
16	Georgia (GEO)	0	0	2	2
16	Hungary (HUN)*	0	0	2	2
18	Austria (AUT)	0	0	1	1
18	Israel (ISR)	0	0	1	1
18	Moldova (MDA)	0	0	1	1
18	Netherlands (NED)	0	0	1	1
18	Romania (ROU)	0	0	1	1
18	Serbia (SRB)	0	0	1	1
18	Spain (ESP)	0	0	1	1
18	Ukraine (UKR)	0	0	1	1
Totals (25 entries)		14	14	28	56
