= 2018 Judo Grand Prix Antalya =

Judo competition

Judo 2018 Judo Grand Prix Antalya
- Venue: Antalya Sports Hall
- Location: Antalya, Turkey
- Dates: 6–8 April 2018
- Competitors: 319 from 50 nations

Competition at external databases
- Links: IJF • EJU • JudoInside

The 2018 Judo Grand Prix Antalya was held at the Antalya Sports Hall in Antalya, Turkey, from 6 to 8 April 2018.

== Medal summary ==
=== Men's events ===
Event	Gold	Silver	Bronze
Extra-lightweight (−60 kg)	Albert Oguzov (RUS)	Jaba Papinashvili (GEO)	Amarbold Jagvaraldorj (MGL)
Extra-lightweight (−60 kg)	Albert Oguzov (RUS)	Jaba Papinashvili (GEO)	Adonis Diaz (USA)
Half-lightweight (−66 kg)	Bagrati Niniashvili (GEO)	Denis Vieru (MDA)	Ganboldyn Kherlen (MGL)
Half-lightweight (−66 kg)	Bagrati Niniashvili (GEO)	Denis Vieru (MDA)	Kilian Le Blouch (FRA)
Lightweight (−73 kg)	Tommy Macias (SWE)	An Chang-rim (KOR)	Hidayat Heydarov (AZE)
Lightweight (−73 kg)	Tommy Macias (SWE)	An Chang-rim (KOR)	Mohammad Mohammadi (IRI)
Half-middleweight (−81 kg)	Vedat Albayrak (TUR)	Jack Hatton (USA)	Tato Grigalashvili (LTU)
Half-middleweight (−81 kg)	Vedat Albayrak (TUR)	Jack Hatton (USA)	Dorin Gotonoaga (MDA)
Middleweight (−90 kg)	Komronshokh Ustopiriyon (TJK)	Nemanja Majdov (SRB)	Mammadali Mehdiyev (AZE)
Middleweight (−90 kg)	Komronshokh Ustopiriyon (TJK)	Nemanja Majdov (SRB)	Tural Safguliyev (AZE)
Half-heavyweight (−100 kg)	Zelym Kotsoiev (AZE)	Arman Adamian (RUS)	Lkhagvasürengiin Otgonbaatar (MGL)
Half-heavyweight (−100 kg)	Zelym Kotsoiev (AZE)	Arman Adamian (RUS)	Benjamin Fletcher (IRL)
Heavyweight (+100 kg)	Inal Tasoev (RUS)	Javad Mahjoub (IRI)	Andy Granda (CUB)
Heavyweight (+100 kg)	Inal Tasoev (RUS)	Javad Mahjoub (IRI)	Kim Sung-min (KOR)

=== Women's events ===
Event	Gold	Silver	Bronze
Extra-lightweight (−48 kg)	Catarina Costa (POR)	Fjolla Kelmendi (KOS)	Sarah Menezes (BRA)
Extra-lightweight (−48 kg)	Catarina Costa (POR)	Fjolla Kelmendi (KOS)	Gülkader Şentürk (TUR)
Half-lightweight (−52 kg)	Distria Krasniqi (KOS)	Chelsie Giles (GBR)	Anja Štangar (SLO)
Half-lightweight (−52 kg)	Distria Krasniqi (KOS)	Chelsie Giles (GBR)	Réka Pupp (HUN)
Lightweight (−57 kg)	Nora Gjakova (KOS)	Kim Jan-di (KOR)	Sabrina Filzmoser (AUT)
Lightweight (−57 kg)	Nora Gjakova (KOS)	Kim Jan-di (KOR)	Maayan Greenberg (ISR)
Half-middleweight (−63 kg)	Magdalena Krssakova (AUT)	Valentina Kostenko (RUS)	Alexia Castilhos (BRA)
Half-middleweight (−63 kg)	Magdalena Krssakova (AUT)	Valentina Kostenko (RUS)	Büşra Katipoğlu (TUR)
Middleweight (−70 kg)	Anna Bernholm (SWE)	Kelita Zupancic (CAN)	Michaela Polleres (AUT)
Middleweight (−70 kg)	Anna Bernholm (SWE)	Kelita Zupancic (CAN)	Sally Conway (GBR)
Half-heavyweight (−78 kg)	Loriana Kuka (KOS)	Anastasiya Turchyn (UKR)	Natalie Powell (GBR)
Half-heavyweight (−78 kg)	Loriana Kuka (KOS)	Anastasiya Turchyn (UKR)	Niurguiana Nikiforova (RUS)
Heavyweight (+78 kg)	Sebile Akbulut (TUR)	Larisa Cerić (BIH)	Anna Gushchina (RUS)
Heavyweight (+78 kg)	Sebile Akbulut (TUR)	Larisa Cerić (BIH)	Galyna Tarasova (UKR)

Source Results

=== Medal table ===
* Host nation (Turkey)

Rank	Nation	Gold	Silver	Bronze	Total
1	Kosovo (KOS)	3	1	0	4
2	Russia (RUS)	2	2	2	6
3	Turkey (TUR)*	2	0	2	4
4	Sweden (SWE)	2	0	0	2
5	Georgia (GEO)	1	1	0	2
6	Azerbaijan (AZE)	1	0	3	4
7	Austria (AUT)	1	0	2	3
8	Portugal (POR)	1	0	0	1
8	Tajikistan (TJK)	1	0	0	1
10	South Korea (KOR)	0	2	1	3
11	Great Britain (GBR)	0	1	2	3
12	Iran (IRI)	0	1	1	2
12	Moldova (MDA)	0	1	1	2
12	Ukraine (UKR)	0	1	1	2
12	United States (USA)	0	1	1	2
16	Bosnia and Herzegovina (BIH)	0	1	0	1
16	Canada (CAN)	0	1	0	1
16	Serbia (SRB)	0	1	0	1
19	Mongolia (MGL)	0	0	3	3
20	Brazil (BRA)	0	0	2	2
21	Cuba (CUB)	0	0	1	1
21	France (FRA)	0	0	1	1
21	Hungary (HUN)	0	0	1	1
21	Ireland (IRL)	0	0	1	1
21	Israel (ISR)	0	0	1	1
21	Lithuania (LTU)	0	0	1	1
21	Slovenia (SLO)	0	0	1	1
Totals (27 entries)		14	14	28	56
