= Islam Khametov =

Russian judoka (born 1993)

Personal information
- Nationality: Russian
- Born: 12 October 1993 (age 32)
- Occupation: Judoka

Sport
- Country: Russia
- Sport: Judo
- Weight class: –66 kg
Medal record
Men's judo
Representing Russia
IJF Grand Slam
Bronze medal – third place	2017 Ekaterinburg	‍–‍66 kg
IJF Grand Prix
Bronze medal – third place	2017 The Hague	‍–‍66 kg
Bronze medal – third place	2019 Tel Aviv	‍–‍66 kg
European U23 Championships
Bronze medal – third place	2015 Bratislava	‍–‍66 kg

Profile at external databases
- IJF: 17659
- JudoInside.com: 65118
- Updated on 21 May 2023

Islam Khametov (born 12 October 1993) is a Russian judoka.

He is the bronze medallist of the 2017 Judo Grand Slam Ekaterinburg in the ‍–‍66 kg category.
