= 2019 Judo Grand Prix Zagreb =

Judo competition

Judo 2019 Judo Grand Prix Zagreb
- Venue: Dom Sportova, Zagreb
- Location: Zagreb, Croatia
- Dates: 26–28 July 2019
- Competitors: 552 from 86 nations

Competition at external databases
- Links: IJF • EJU • JudoInside

The 2019 Judo Grand Prix Zagreb was held in Zagreb, Croatia, from 26 to 28 July 2019.

== Medal summary ==
=== Men's events ===
Event	Gold	Silver	Bronze
Extra-lightweight (−60 kg)	Sharafuddin Lutfillaev (UZB)	Ashley McKenzie (GBR)	Enkhtaivany Ariunbold (MGL)
Extra-lightweight (−60 kg)	Sharafuddin Lutfillaev (UZB)	Ashley McKenzie (GBR)	Tomer Golomb (ISR)
Half-lightweight (−66 kg)	Alberto Gaitero (ESP)	Denis Vieru (MDA)	Kilian Le Blouch (FRA)
Half-lightweight (−66 kg)	Alberto Gaitero (ESP)	Denis Vieru (MDA)	Davaadorjiin Tömörkhüleg (MGL)
Lightweight (−73 kg)	Tohar Butbul (ISR)	Arthur Margelidon (CAN)	Denis Iartsev (RUS)
Lightweight (−73 kg)	Tohar Butbul (ISR)	Arthur Margelidon (CAN)	Musa Mogushkov (RUS)
Half-middleweight (−81 kg)	Takanori Nagase (JPN)	Antoine Valois-Fortier (CAN)	Saeid Mollaei (IRI)
Half-middleweight (−81 kg)	Takanori Nagase (JPN)	Antoine Valois-Fortier (CAN)	Tato Grigalashvili (GEO)
Middleweight (−90 kg)	Beka Gviniashvili (GEO)	Sanshiro Murao (JPN)	Krisztián Tóth (HUN)
Middleweight (−90 kg)	Beka Gviniashvili (GEO)	Sanshiro Murao (JPN)	Noël van 't End (NED)
Half-heavyweight (−100 kg)	Shady El Nahas (CAN)	Alexandre Iddir (FRA)	Peter Paltchik (ISR)
Half-heavyweight (−100 kg)	Shady El Nahas (CAN)	Alexandre Iddir (FRA)	Jorge Fonseca (POR)
Heavyweight (+100 kg)	Gela Zaalishvili (GEO)	Hisayoshi Harasawa (JPN)	Levani Matiashvili (GEO)
Heavyweight (+100 kg)	Gela Zaalishvili (GEO)	Hisayoshi Harasawa (JPN)	Alisher Yusupov (UZB)

=== Women's events ===
Event	Gold	Silver	Bronze
Extra-lightweight (−48 kg)	Otgontsetseg Galbadrakh (KAZ)	Mélanie Clément (FRA)	Li Yanan (CHN)
Extra-lightweight (−48 kg)	Otgontsetseg Galbadrakh (KAZ)	Mélanie Clément (FRA)	Gülkader Şentürk (TUR)
Half-lightweight (−52 kg)	Natsumi Tsunoda (JPN)	Park Da-sol (KOR)	Charline Van Snick (BEL)
Half-lightweight (−52 kg)	Natsumi Tsunoda (JPN)	Park Da-sol (KOR)	Chelsie Giles (GBR)
Lightweight (−57 kg)	Jessica Klimkait (CAN)	Momo Tamaoki (JPN)	Nekoda Smythe-Davis (GBR)
Lightweight (−57 kg)	Jessica Klimkait (CAN)	Momo Tamaoki (JPN)	Eteri Liparteliani (GEO)
Half-middleweight (−63 kg)	Tina Trstenjak (SLO)	Nami Nabekura (JPN)	Sanne Vermeer (NED)
Half-middleweight (−63 kg)	Tina Trstenjak (SLO)	Nami Nabekura (JPN)	Cho Mok-hee (KOR)
Middleweight (−70 kg)	Gemma Howell (GBR)	Kim Polling (NED)	Michaela Polleres (AUT)
Middleweight (−70 kg)	Gemma Howell (GBR)	Kim Polling (NED)	Sanne van Dijke (NED)
Half-heavyweight (−78 kg)	Mami Umeki (JPN)	Fanny Estelle Posvite (FRA)	Marhinde Verkerk (NED)
Half-heavyweight (−78 kg)	Mami Umeki (JPN)	Fanny Estelle Posvite (FRA)	Karla Prodan (CRO)
Heavyweight (+78 kg)	Akira Sone (JPN)	Larisa Cerić (BIH)	Iryna Kindzerska (AZE)
Heavyweight (+78 kg)	Akira Sone (JPN)	Larisa Cerić (BIH)	Anamari Velenšek (SLO)

Source Results

=== Medal table ===
* Host nation (Croatia)

Rank	Nation	Gold	Silver	Bronze	Total
1	Japan (JPN)	4	4	0	8
2	Canada (CAN)	2	2	0	4
3	Georgia (GEO)	2	0	3	5
4	Great Britain (GBR)	1	1	2	4
5	Israel (ISR)	1	0	2	3
6	Slovenia (SLO)	1	0	1	2
6	Uzbekistan (UZB)	1	0	1	2
8	Kazakhstan (KAZ)	1	0	0	1
8	Spain (ESP)	1	0	0	1
10	France (FRA)	0	3	1	4
11	Netherlands (NED)	0	1	4	5
12	South Korea (KOR)	0	1	1	2
13	Bosnia and Herzegovina (BIH)	0	1	0	1
13	Moldova (MDA)	0	1	0	1
15	Mongolia (MGL)	0	0	2	2
15	Russia (RUS)	0	0	2	2
17	Austria (AUT)	0	0	1	1
17	Azerbaijan (AZE)	0	0	1	1
17	Belgium (BEL)	0	0	1	1
17	China (CHN)	0	0	1	1
17	Croatia (CRO)*	0	0	1	1
17	Hungary (HUN)	0	0	1	1
17	Iran (IRI)	0	0	1	1
17	Portugal (POR)	0	0	1	1
17	Turkey (TUR)	0	0	1	1
Totals (25 entries)		14	14	28	56
