= 2017 Judo Grand Slam Ekaterinburg =

Judo competition

Judo 2017 Judo Grand Slam Ekaterinburg
- Venue: Palace of Sports, Ekaterinburg
- Location: Ekaterinburg, Russia
- Dates: 20–21 May 2017
- Competitors: 251 from 34 nations

Competition at external databases
- Links: IJF • EJU • JudoInside

The 2017 Judo Grand Slam was held in Ekaterinburg, Russia, from 20 to 21 May 2017.

== Medal summary ==
=== Men's events ===
Event	Gold	Silver	Bronze
Extra-lightweight (−60 kg)	Ryuju Nagayama (JPN)	Amiran Papinashvili (GEO)	Cédric Revol (FRA)
Extra-lightweight (−60 kg)	Ryuju Nagayama (JPN)	Amiran Papinashvili (GEO)	Albert Oguzov (RUS)
Half-lightweight (−66 kg)	Abdula Abdulzhalilov (RUS)	Charles Chibana (BRA)	Dzmitry Minkou (BLR)
Half-lightweight (−66 kg)	Abdula Abdulzhalilov (RUS)	Charles Chibana (BRA)	Islam Khametov (RUS)
Lightweight (−73 kg)	Soichi Hashimoto (JPN)	Marcelo Contini (BRA)	Pierre Duprat (FRA)
Lightweight (−73 kg)	Soichi Hashimoto (JPN)	Marcelo Contini (BRA)	Benjamin Axus (FRA)
Half-middleweight (−81 kg)	Khasan Khalmurzaev (RUS)	Attila Ungvári (HUN)	Étienne Briand (CAN)
Half-middleweight (−81 kg)	Khasan Khalmurzaev (RUS)	Attila Ungvári (HUN)	Zebeda Rekhviashvili (GEO)
Middleweight (−90 kg)	Kenta Nagasawa (JPN)	Krisztián Tóth (HUN)	Noël van 't End (NED)
Middleweight (−90 kg)	Kenta Nagasawa (JPN)	Krisztián Tóth (HUN)	Magomed Magomedov (RUS)
Half-heavyweight (−100 kg)	Miklós Cirjenics (HUN)	Niyaz Ilyasov (RUS)	Varlam Liparteliani (GEO)
Half-heavyweight (−100 kg)	Miklós Cirjenics (HUN)	Niyaz Ilyasov (RUS)	Laurin Boehler (AUT)
Heavyweight (+100 kg)	David Moura (BRA)	Levani Matiashvili (GEO)	Battulgyn Temüülen (MGL)
Heavyweight (+100 kg)	David Moura (BRA)	Levani Matiashvili (GEO)	Andrey Volkov (RUS)

=== Women's events ===
Event	Gold	Silver	Bronze
Extra-lightweight (−48 kg)	Ami Kondo (JPN)	Sabina Giliazova (RUS)	Otgontsetseg Galbadrakh (KAZ)
Extra-lightweight (−48 kg)	Ami Kondo (JPN)	Sabina Giliazova (RUS)	Mélanie Clément (FRA)
Half-lightweight (−52 kg)	Érika Miranda (BRA)	Alesya Kuznetsova (RUS)	Amandine Buchard (FRA)
Half-lightweight (−52 kg)	Érika Miranda (BRA)	Alesya Kuznetsova (RUS)	Natalia Kuziutina (RUS)
Lightweight (−57 kg)	Miryam Roper (PAN)	Nae Udaka (JPN)	Jessica Klimkait (CAN)
Lightweight (−57 kg)	Miryam Roper (PAN)	Nae Udaka (JPN)	Rafaela Silva (BRA)
Half-middleweight (−63 kg)	Martyna Trajdos (GER)	Ekaterina Valkova (RUS)	Mariana Silva (BRA)
Half-middleweight (−63 kg)	Martyna Trajdos (GER)	Ekaterina Valkova (RUS)	Amy Livesey (GBR)
Middleweight (−70 kg)	Sanne van Dijke (NED)	Alena Prokopenko (RUS)	Saki Niizoe (JPN)
Middleweight (−70 kg)	Sanne van Dijke (NED)	Alena Prokopenko (RUS)	Anna Bernholm (SWE)
Half-heavyweight (−78 kg)	Mami Umeki (JPN)	Natalie Powell (GBR)	Abigél Joó (HUN)
Half-heavyweight (−78 kg)	Mami Umeki (JPN)	Natalie Powell (GBR)	Anna-Maria Wagner (GER)
Heavyweight (+78 kg)	Sarah Asahina (JPN)	Jasmin Grabowski (GER)	Maryna Slutskaya (BLR)
Heavyweight (+78 kg)	Sarah Asahina (JPN)	Jasmin Grabowski (GER)	Carolin Weiß (GER)

Source Results

=== Medal table ===
* Host nation (Russia)

Rank	Nation	Gold	Silver	Bronze	Total
1	Japan (JPN)	6	1	1	8
2	Russia (RUS)*	2	5	5	12
3	Brazil (BRA)	2	2	2	6
4	Hungary (HUN)	1	2	1	4
5	Germany (GER)	1	1	2	4
6	Netherlands (NED)	1	0	1	2
7	Panama (PAN)	1	0	0	1
8	Georgia (GEO)	0	2	2	4
9	Great Britain (GBR)	0	1	1	2
10	France (FRA)	0	0	5	5
11	Belarus (BLR)	0	0	2	2
11	Canada (CAN)	0	0	2	2
13	Austria (AUT)	0	0	1	1
13	Kazakhstan (KAZ)	0	0	1	1
13	Mongolia (MGL)	0	0	1	1
13	Sweden (SWE)	0	0	1	1
Totals (16 entries)		14	14	28	56
