= 2021 European Judo Championships =

2021 Judo European Judo Championships
- Venue: MEO Arena
- Location: Lisbon, Portugal
- Dates: 16–18 April 2021
- Competitors: 359 from 45 nations

Competition at external databases
- Links: IJF • EJU • JudoInside

The 2021 European Judo Championships were held in Lisbon, Portugal from 16 to 18 April 2021.

== Medal summary ==
=== Medal table ===
* Host nation (Portugal)

| Rank | Nation | Gold | Silver | Bronze | Total |
|---|---|---|---|---|---|
| 1 | Kosovo | 2 | 0 | 1 | 3 |
| 2 | Turkey | 2 | 0 | 0 | 2 |
| 3 | France | 1 | 3 | 4 | 8 |
| 4 | Georgia | 1 | 3 | 1 | 5 |
| 5 | Netherlands | 1 | 2 | 1 | 4 |
| 6 | Russia | 1 | 1 | 5 | 7 |
| 7 | Italy | 1 | 1 | 1 | 3 |
| 7 | Slovenia | 1 | 1 | 1 | 3 |
| 9 | Belgium | 1 | 1 | 0 | 2 |
| 10 | Portugal* | 1 | 0 | 3 | 4 |
| 11 | Spain | 1 | 0 | 1 | 2 |
| 12 | Poland | 1 | 0 | 0 | 1 |
| 13 | Israel | 0 | 1 | 2 | 3 |
| 14 | Ukraine | 0 | 1 | 0 | 1 |
| 15 | Azerbaijan | 0 | 0 | 2 | 2 |
| 15 | Hungary | 0 | 0 | 2 | 2 |
| 17 | Austria | 0 | 0 | 1 | 1 |
| 17 | Belarus | 0 | 0 | 1 | 1 |
| 17 | Czech Republic | 0 | 0 | 1 | 1 |
| 17 | Switzerland | 0 | 0 | 1 | 1 |
| Totals (20 entries) | | 14 | 14 | 28 | 56 |

=== Men's events ===
| Event | Gold | Silver | Bronze |
|---|---|---|---|
| Extra-lightweight (–60 kg) | Francisco Garrigós; Spain | Luka Mkheidze; France | Yago Abuladze; Russia |
| Extra-lightweight (–60 kg) | Francisco Garrigós; Spain | Luka Mkheidze; France | Karamat Huseynov; Azerbaijan |
| Half-lightweight (–66 kg) | Manuel Lombardo; Italy | Vazha Margvelashvili; Georgia | João Crisóstomo; Portugal |
| Half-lightweight (–66 kg) | Manuel Lombardo; Italy | Vazha Margvelashvili; Georgia | Alberto Gaitero; Spain |
| Lightweight (–73 kg) | Akil Gjakova; Kosovo | Tohar Butbul; Israel | Nils Stump; Switzerland |
| Lightweight (–73 kg) | Akil Gjakova; Kosovo | Tohar Butbul; Israel | Musa Mogushkov; Russia |
| Half-middleweight (–81 kg) | Vedat Albayrak; Turkey | Matthias Casse; Belgium | Christian Parlati; Italy |
| Half-middleweight (–81 kg) | Vedat Albayrak; Turkey | Matthias Casse; Belgium | Sagi Muki; Israel |
| Middleweight (–90 kg) | Lasha Bekauri; Georgia | Beka Gviniashvili; Georgia | Mikhail Igolnikov; Russia |
| Middleweight (–90 kg) | Lasha Bekauri; Georgia | Beka Gviniashvili; Georgia | Krisztián Tóth; Hungary |
| Half-heavyweight (–100 kg) | Toma Nikiforov; Belgium | Varlam Liparteliani; Georgia | Alexandre Iddir; France |
| Half-heavyweight (–100 kg) | Toma Nikiforov; Belgium | Varlam Liparteliani; Georgia | Zelym Kotsoiev; Azerbaijan |
| Heavyweight (+100 kg) | Inal Tasoev; Russia | Henk Grol; Netherlands | Guram Tushishvili; Georgia |
| Heavyweight (+100 kg) | Inal Tasoev; Russia | Henk Grol; Netherlands | Lukáš Krpálek; Czech Republic |

=== Women's events ===
| Event | Gold | Silver | Bronze |
|---|---|---|---|
| Extra-lightweight (–48 kg) | Distria Krasniqi; Kosovo | Daria Bilodid; Ukraine | Mélanie Clément; France |
| Extra-lightweight (–48 kg) | Distria Krasniqi; Kosovo | Daria Bilodid; Ukraine | Sabina Giliazova; Russia |
| Half-lightweight (–52 kg) | Amandine Buchard; France | Odette Giuffrida; Italy | Gefen Primo; Israel |
| Half-lightweight (–52 kg) | Amandine Buchard; France | Odette Giuffrida; Italy | Réka Pupp; Hungary |
| Lightweight (–57 kg) | Telma Monteiro; Portugal | Kaja Kajzer; Slovenia | Sarah-Léonie Cysique; France |
| Lightweight (–57 kg) | Telma Monteiro; Portugal | Kaja Kajzer; Slovenia | Nora Gjakova; Kosovo |
| Half-middleweight (–63 kg) | Tina Trstenjak; Slovenia | Daria Davydova; Russia | Andreja Leški; Slovenia |
| Half-middleweight (–63 kg) | Tina Trstenjak; Slovenia | Daria Davydova; Russia | Sanne Vermeer; Netherlands |
| Middleweight (–70 kg) | Sanne van Dijke; Netherlands | Margaux Pinot; France | Madina Taimazova; Russia |
| Middleweight (–70 kg) | Sanne van Dijke; Netherlands | Margaux Pinot; France | Bárbara Timo; Portugal |
| Half-heavyweight (–78 kg) | Beata Pacut; Poland | Guusje Steenhuis; Netherlands | Fanny Estelle Posvite; France |
| Half-heavyweight (–78 kg) | Beata Pacut; Poland | Guusje Steenhuis; Netherlands | Bernadette Graf; Austria |
| Heavyweight (+78 kg) | Kayra Sayit; Turkey | Léa Fontaine; France | Maryna Slutskaya; Belarus |
| Heavyweight (+78 kg) | Kayra Sayit; Turkey | Léa Fontaine; France | Rochele Nunes; Portugal |

== Participating nations ==
A total of 359 competitors from 45 nations participated.

- Armenia (1)
- Austria (8)
- Azerbaijan (9)
- Belarus (5)
- Belgium (10)
- Bosnia and Herzegovina (2)
- Bulgaria (5)
- Croatia (10)
- Cyprus (3)
- Czech Republic (6)
- Denmark (2)
- Estonia (3)
- Finland (6)
- France (18)
- Georgia (14)
- Germany (18)
- Greece (5)
- Hungary (11)
- Iceland (2)
- Ireland (2)
- Israel (13)
- Italy (17)
- Kosovo (6)
- Latvia (2)
- Liechtenstein (1)
- Lithuania (1)
- Luxembourg (1)
- Malta (2)
- Moldova (8)
- Monaco (2)
- Montenegro (4)
- Netherlands (13)
- Poland (16)
- Portugal (18)
- Romania (14)
- Russia (18)
- San Marino (1)
- Serbia (11)
- Slovakia (6)
- Slovenia (13)
- Spain (18)
- Sweden (4)
- Switzerland (4)
- Turkey (14)
- Ukraine (12)
