= Margaux Pinot =

French judoka (born 1994)

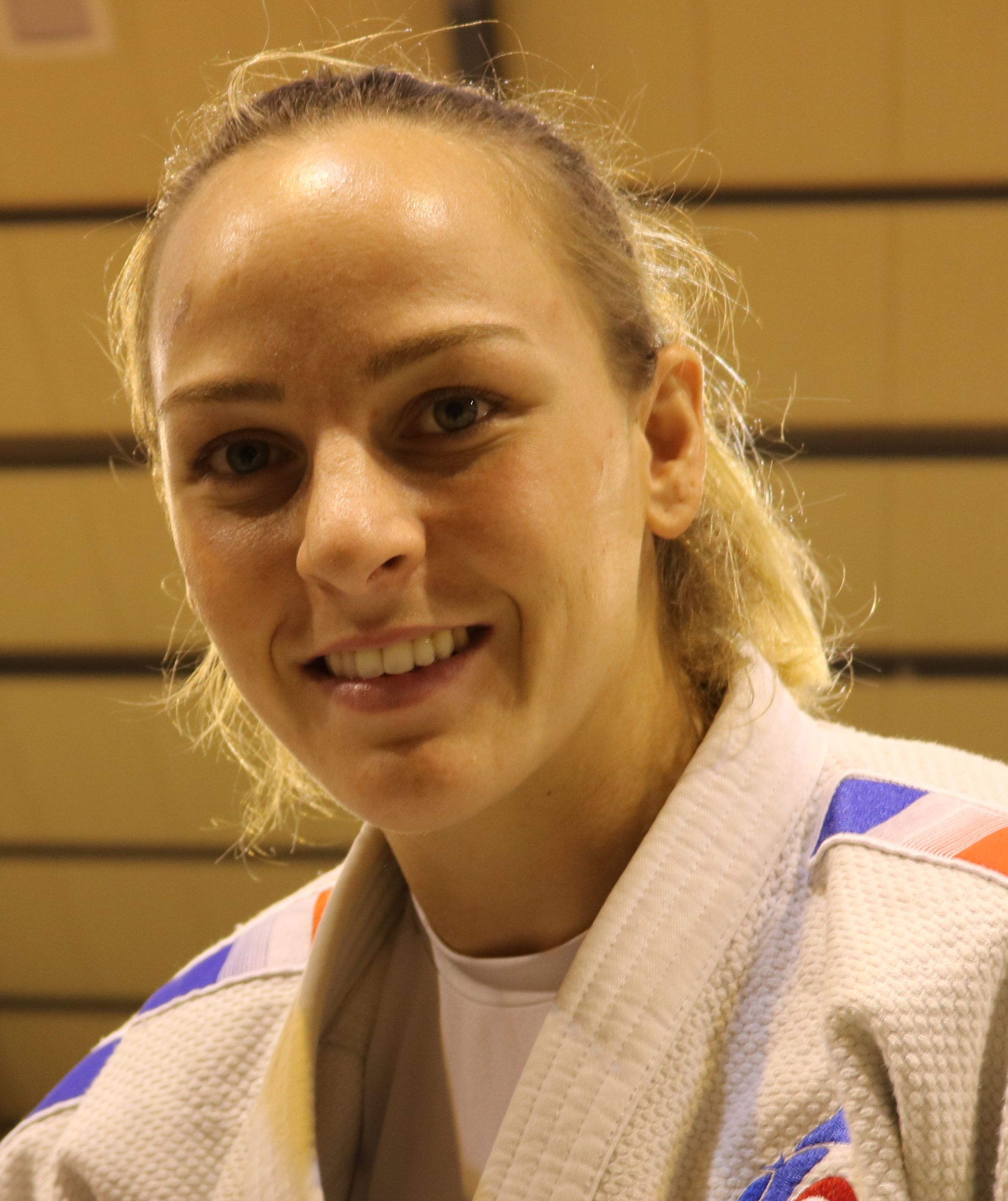
- Pinot in 2021

Personal information
- Born: 6 January 1994 (age 32) Besançon, France
- Occupation: Judoka

Sport
- Country: France
- Sport: Judo
- Weight class: ‍–‍70 kg
- Retired: 18 May 2026

Achievements and titles
- Olympic Games: R16 (2020)
- World Champ.: (gold) (2024)
- European Champ.: (gold) (2019, 2020)
Medal record
Women's judo
Representing France
Olympic Games
Gold medal – first place	2020 Tokyo	Mixed team
World Championships
Gold medal – first place	2014 Chelyabinsk	Women's team
Gold medal – first place	2024 Abu Dhabi	‍–‍70 kg
Silver medal – second place	2019 Tokyo	Mixed team
Silver medal – second place	2022 Tashkent	Mixed team
Silver medal – second place	2023 Doha	Mixed team
Silver medal – second place	2024 Abu Dhabi	Mixed team
Bronze medal – third place	2019 Tokyo	‍–‍70 kg
European Games
Gold medal – first place	2019 Minsk	‍–‍70 kg
European Championships
Gold medal – first place	2017 Warsaw	Women's team
Gold medal – first place	2020 Prague	‍–‍70 kg
Gold medal – first place	2022 Mulhouse	Mixed team
Gold medal – first place	2024 Zagreb	Mixed team
Silver medal – second place	2017 Warsaw	‍–‍63 kg
Silver medal – second place	2021 Lisbon	‍–‍70 kg
Bronze medal – third place	2016 Kazan	Women's team
Bronze medal – third place	2022 Sofia	‍–‍70 kg
IJF Grand Slam
Gold medal – first place	2018 Abu Dhabi	‍–‍70 kg
Gold medal – first place	2021 Tel Aviv	‍–‍70 kg
Gold medal – first place	2022 Paris	‍–‍70 kg
Gold medal – first place	2023 Tel Aviv	‍–‍70 kg
Silver medal – second place	2019 Paris	‍–‍70 kg
Silver medal – second place	2020 Budapest	‍–‍70 kg
Silver medal – second place	2024 Tashkent	‍–‍70 kg
Bronze medal – third place	2015 Paris	‍–‍70 kg
Bronze medal – third place	2016 Tokyo	‍–‍63 kg
Bronze medal – third place	2017 Paris	‍–‍63 kg
Bronze medal – third place	2018 Osaka	‍–‍70 kg
Bronze medal – third place	2020 Düsseldorf	‍–‍70 kg
Bronze medal – third place	2022 Antalya	‍–‍70 kg
Bronze medal – third place	2024 Paris	‍–‍70 kg
IJF Grand Prix
Gold medal – first place	2016 Samsun	‍–‍63 kg
Gold medal – first place	2016 Almaty	‍–‍63 kg
Gold medal – first place	2019 Marrakesh	‍–‍70 kg
Gold medal – first place	2023 Dushanbe	‍–‍70 kg
Bronze medal – third place	2013 Abu Dhabi	‍–‍70 kg
Bronze medal – third place	2014 Samsun	‍–‍70 kg
World Juniors Championships
Silver medal – second place	2013 Ljubljana	Women's team
Bronze medal – third place	2013 Ljubljana	‍–‍70 kg
European Junior Championships
Gold medal – first place	2011 Lommel	‍–‍63 kg
Gold medal – first place	2012 Poreč	‍–‍63 kg
European Cadet Championships
Gold medal – first place	2009 Koper	‍–‍57 kg
Silver medal – second place	2010 Teplice	‍–‍63 kg
Summer Universiade
Bronze medal – third place	2015 Gwangju	‍–‍70 kg
Mediterranean Games
Bronze medal – third place	2018 Tarragona	‍–‍70 kg

Profile at external databases
- IJF: 6626
- JudoInside.com: 56671
- Updated on 21 May 2026

Margaux Pinot (French: [maʁɡo pino]; born 6 January 1994) is a French retired judoka. In 2020, she won the gold medal in the women's 70 kg event at the 2020 European Championships held in Prague, Czech Republic. In 2021, she competed in the women's 70 kg event at the 2020 Summer Olympics in Tokyo, Japan.

Pinot is the silver medalist from the 2017 European Championships in the 63 kg division.

Pinot won the gold medal in her event at the 2022 Paris Grand Slam held in Paris, France.

On 12 November 2022 Pinot won a gold medal at the 2022 European Mixed Team Championships as part of team France.
