= Alena Prokopenko =

Russian judoka (born 1992)

Personal information
- Born: 29 September 1992 (age 34) Saint Petersburg, Russia
- Occupation: Judoka
- Height: 1.70 m (5 ft 7 in)

Sport
- Country: Russia
- Sport: Judo
- Weight class: ‍–‍70 kg

Achievements and titles
- World Champ.: R16 (2017)
- European Champ.: R16 (2020)
Medal record
Women's judo
Representing Russia
World Championships
Bronze medal – third place	2018 Baku	Mixed team
Bronze medal – third place	2019 Tokyo	Mixed team
European Games
Gold medal – first place	2019 Minsk	Mixed team
European Championships
Bronze medal – third place	2018 Yekaterinburg	Mixed team
IJF Grand Slam
Silver medal – second place	2017 Ekaterinburg	‍–‍70 kg
European U23 Championships
Silver medal – second place	2013 Samokov	‍–‍70 kg
Bronze medal – third place	2011 Tyumen	‍–‍78 kg
European Junior Championships
Silver medal – second place	2011 Lommel	‍–‍78 kg
Military World Games
Gold medal – first place	2019 Wuhan	‍–‍70 kg

Profile at external databases
- IJF: 3822
- JudoInside.com: 49843
- Updated on 26 November 2022

Alena Yuryevna Prokopenko (Russian: Алёна Юрьевна Прокопенко; born 29 September 1992) is a Russian judoka.

Prokopenko participated at the 2018 World Judo Championships, winning a medal.

In 2020, Prokopenko competed in the women's 70 kg event at the 2020 European Judo Championships held in Prague, Czech Republic.
