= María Pérez (judoka) =

Puerto Rican judoka (born 1989)

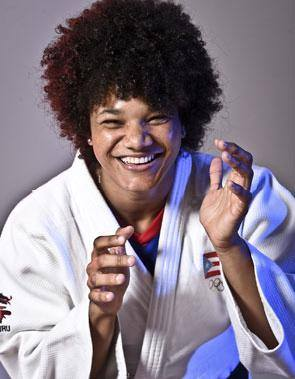

Personal information
- Born: April 1, 1989 (age 37) Carolina, Puerto Rico
- Occupation: Judoka

Sport
- Country: Puerto Rico
- Sport: Judo
- Weight class: ‍–‍70 kg

Achievements and titles
- Olympic Games: R16 (2016, 2020)
- World Champ.: (silver) (2017)
- Pan American Champ.: (2019, 2024)
Medal record
Women's judo
Representing Puerto Rico
World Championships
Silver medal – second place	2017 Budapest	‍–‍70 kg
Pan American Games
Silver medal – second place	2023 Santiago	‍–‍70 kg
Bronze medal – third place	2011 Guadalajara	‍–‍70 kg
Bronze medal – third place	2019 Lima	‍–‍70 kg
Pan American Championships
Gold medal – first place	2019 Lima	‍–‍70 kg
Gold medal – first place	2024 Rio de Janeiro	‍–‍70 kg
Silver medal – second place	2020 Guadalajara	‍–‍70 kg
Bronze medal – third place	2014 Guayaquil	‍–‍70 kg
Bronze medal – third place	2016 Havana	‍–‍70 kg
IJF Grand Slam
Bronze medal – third place	2016 Baku	‍–‍70 kg
Bronze medal – third place	2017 Tokyo	‍–‍70 kg
Bronze medal – third place	2022 Budapest	‍–‍70 kg
IJF Grand Prix
Gold medal – first place	2023 Linz	‍–‍70 kg
Gold medal – first place	2023 Perth	‍–‍70 kg
Gold medal – first place	2024 Linz	‍–‍70 kg
Silver medal – second place	2018 Agadir	‍–‍70 kg
Bronze medal – third place	2013 Miami	‍–‍70 kg
Bronze medal – third place	2016 Samsun	‍–‍70 kg
Bronze medal – third place	2016 Almaty	‍–‍70 kg
Bronze medal – third place	2016 Budapest	‍–‍70 kg
Bronze medal – third place	2019 Tbilisi	‍–‍70 kg
Central American and Caribbean Games
Gold medal – first place	2010 Mayagüez	‍–‍70 kg
Silver medal – second place	2010 Mayagüez	Women's team
Bronze medal – third place	2018 Barranquilla	‍–‍70 kg
Bronze medal – third place	2018 Barranquilla	Women's team

Profile at external databases
- IJF: 4225
- JudoInside.com: 68613
- Updated on April 29, 2024

María Pérez Marcano (born April 1, 1989) is a Puerto Rican judoka.

Pérez competed at the 2016 Summer Olympics in Rio de Janeiro, in the women's 70 kg. She also competed in the women's 70 kg event at the 2020 Summer Olympics in Tokyo, Japan.

In 2020, Pérez won the silver medal in the women's 70 kg event at the 2020 Pan American Judo Championships held in Guadalajara, Mexico.
