= Madina Taimazova =

Russian judoka (born 1999)

Madina Taymazova
Personal information
- Full name: Madina Andreyevna Taymazova
- Born: Мадина Андреевна Таймазова; 30 June 1999 (age 27) Sunzha, Prigorodny District, North Ossetia-Alania, Russia
- Occupation: Judoka
- Military career
- Allegiance: Russia
- Branch: Russian Armed Forces
- Rank: Warrant officer

Sport
- Country: Russia
- Sport: Judo
- Weight class: ‍–‍70 kg

Achievements and titles
- Olympic Games: (bronze) (2020)
- World Champ.: (bronze) (2024, 2026)
- European Champ.: (silver) (2023)
Medal record
Women's judo
Representing ROC
Olympic Games
Bronze medal – third place	2020 Tokyo	‍–‍70 kg
Representing Russia
World Championships
Silver medal – second place	2026 Baku	Mixed team
Bronze medal – third place	2019 Tokyo	Mixed team
Bronze medal – third place	2026 Baku	‍–‍70 kg
European Championships
Bronze medal – third place	2020 Prague	‍–‍70 kg
Bronze medal – third place	2021 Lisbon	‍–‍70 kg
Bronze medal – third place	2026 Tbilisi	‍–‍70 kg
World Masters
Silver medal – second place	2021 Doha	‍–‍70 kg
IJF Grand Slam
Gold medal – first place	2021 Kazan	‍–‍70 kg
Gold medal – first place	2026 Tbilisi	‍–‍70 kg
Silver medal – second place	2021 Tbilisi	‍–‍70 kg
Silver medal – second place	2025 Tokyo	‍–‍70 kg
Bronze medal – third place	2026 Lausanne	‍–‍70 kg
European U23 Championships
Bronze medal – third place	2018 Győr	‍–‍70 kg
World Juniors Championships
Silver medal – second place	2019 Marrakesh	‍–‍70 kg
European Junior Championships
Gold medal – first place	2017 Maribor	‍–‍70 kg
World Cadets Championships
Bronze medal – third place	2015 Sarajevo	‍–‍70 kg
European Cadet Championships
Gold medal – first place	2016 Vantaa	‍–‍70 kg
World University Games
Silver medal – second place	2019 Naples	‍–‍70 kg
Representing Individual Neutral Athletes
World Championships
Bronze medal – third place	2024 Abu Dhabi	‍–‍70 kg
European Championships
Silver medal – second place	2023 Montpellier	‍–‍70 kg
IJF Grand Slam
Gold medal – first place	2023 Abu Dhabi	‍–‍70 kg
Bronze medal – third place	2023 Ulaanbaatar	‍–‍70 kg
Bronze medal – third place	2024 Antalya	‍–‍70 kg
Representing the IJF
IJF Grand Slam
Gold medal – first place	2022 Ulaanbaatar	‍–‍70 kg
Bronze medal – third place	2025 Tbilisi	‍–‍70 kg

Profile at external databases
- IJF: 21422
- JudoInside.com: 95746
- Updated on 8 October 2026

Madina Andreyevna Taymazova (Russian: Мадина Андреевна Таймазова, IPA: [mɐˈdʲinə tɐɪ̯ˈmazəvə]; born 30 June 1999) is a Russian judoka of Ossetian ethnicity. In 2021, she won one of the bronze medals in the women's 70 kg event at the 2020 Summer Olympics in Tokyo, Japan.

== Career ==
In 2018, she won one of the bronze medals in the women's 70 kg event at the 2018 European U23 Judo Championships held in Győr, Hungary. She won a medal at the 2019 World Judo Championships.

In 2021, she won the silver medal in her event at the Judo World Masters held in Doha, Qatar.

== Personal life ==
Taymazova is a warrant officer of the Russian Armed Forces and a member of the army sports club CSKA Moscow.

In 2022, Taymazova made photos in front of a poster depicting Putin and pro-war slogans. In October 2022, she participated in the Russian Club Judo Championships held on the occasion of Putin's 70th birthday and shared photos from the championships on her Instagram account. She also organized trainings for children deported from Russian-occupied territories.
