= Winnie Gofit =

Nigerian freestyle wrestler

Personal information
- Occupation: Soldier Judoka

Sport
- Country: Nigeria
- Sport: Amateur wrestling
- Event: Freestyle
Medal record
Women's freestyle wrestling
Representing Nigeria
Commonwealth Wrestling Championship
| Silver medal – second place | 2017 Marrakesh | 72 kg |
African Wrestling Championships
| Gold medal – first place | 2017 Marrakesh | 72 kg |
| Gold medal – first place | 2018 Port Harcourt | 72 kg |

Winnie Gofit also known as Winifred Gofit (born May 22, 1994) is a Nigerian freestyle wrestler. She is a gold medalist of the African Championships in 2017 and 2018. She is also a silver medallist of Commonwealth Wrestling Championship.

Winnie is included in the Nigerian Judo Hall Of Fame as the Highest ranked woman in Nigerian Judo Federation.

== Sports career ==
In 2017, she won the gold medal in the women's freestyle 75 kg event at the 2017 African Wrestling Championships held in Marrakesh, Morocco.

Also in 2017, she represented Commonwealth Wrestling Championship held in Johannesburg, South Africa and she won the silver medal in the women's freestyle 72 kg event.

In 2018, she won the gold medal in the women's freestyle 72 kg event at the 2018 African Wrestling Championships held in Port Harcourt, Nigeria.
