= Kim Seong-yeon =

South Korean judoka (born 1991)

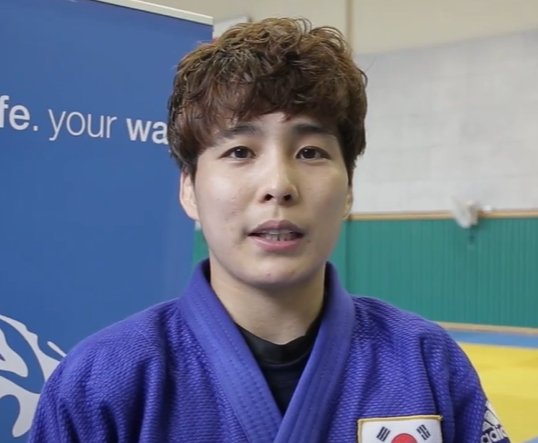

Personal information
- Born: 16 April 1991 (age 35) Suncheon, South Korea
- Occupation: Judoka
- Height: 172 cm (5 ft 8 in)

Sport
- Country: South Korea
- Sport: Judo
- Coached by: Lee Won-hee

Achievements and titles
- Olympic Games: R16 (2016, 2020)
- World Champ.: (bronze) (2013)
- Asian Champ.: (gold) (2014)
Medal record
Women's judo
Representing South Korea
World Championships
Bronze medal – third place	2013 Rio de Janeiro	‍–‍70 kg
Asian Games
Gold medal – first place	2014 Incheon	‍–‍70 kg
Silver medal – second place	2014 Incheon	Women's team
Silver medal – second place	2018 Jakarta	‍–‍70 kg
Asian Championships
Silver medal – second place	2016 Tashkent	‍–‍70 kg
Silver medal – second place	2017 Hong Kong	‍–‍70 kg
Silver medal – second place	2021 Bishkek	‍–‍70 kg
World Masters
Bronze medal – third place	2016 Guadalajara	‍–‍70 kg
IJF Grand Slam
Gold medal – first place	2016 Paris	‍–‍70 kg
Bronze medal – third place	2013 Tokyo	‍–‍70 kg
Bronze medal – third place	2014 Tyumen	‍–‍70 kg
IJF Grand Prix
Gold medal – first place	2013 Ulaanbaatar	‍–‍70 kg
Gold medal – first place	2015 Tashkent	‍–‍70 kg
Silver medal – second place	2011 Qingdao	‍–‍70 kg
Silver medal – second place	2015 Jeju	‍–‍70 kg
Silver medal – second place	2017 Hohhot	‍–‍70 kg
Silver medal – second place	2020 Tel Aviv	‍–‍70 kg
Bronze medal – third place	2013 Düsseldorf	‍–‍70 kg
Bronze medal – third place	2013 Jeju	‍–‍70 kg
Bronze medal – third place	2015 Qingdao	‍–‍70 kg
Bronze medal – third place	2019 Montreal	‍–‍70 kg
World Juniors Championships
Bronze medal – third place	2010 Agadir	‍–‍70 kg
Asian Junior Championships
Gold medal – first place	2009 Beirut	‍–‍63 kg
Summer Universiade
Gold medal – first place	2015 Gwangju	‍–‍70 kg
Bronze medal – third place	2017 Taipei	‍–‍70 kg

Profile at external databases
- IJF: 3702
- JudoInside.com: 71920
- Updated on 21 May 2023

Kim Seong-Yeon (Korean: 김성연, born 16 April 1991) is a South Korean judoka. She won a bronze medal in the –70 kg at the 2013 World Judo Championships. She was ranked No. 9 in the world as of 8 February 2016. She lost in the second round of the 2016 Olympics to Israeli Linda Bolder.

In 2021, she competed in the women's 70 kg event at the 2020 Summer Olympics in Tokyo, Japan.

== Competitive record ==
Judo Record
Total	85
Wins	62
by Ippon	29
Losses	23
by Ippon	11

(as of 19 February 2016)
