= Sun Xiaoqian =

Chinese judoka (born 1996)

Personal information
- Nationality: Chinese
- Born: 11 August 1996 (age 29)
- Occupation: Judoka

Sport
- Country: Peoples's Rupublic of China
- Sport: Judo
- Weight class: –70 kg
Medal record
Women's judo
Representing China
Asian Judo Championships
| Bronze medal – third place | 2021 Bishkek | -70 kg |

Profile at external databases
- IJF: 49080
- JudoInside.com: 129631
- Updated on 3 November 2021

Sun Xiaoqian (born 11 August 1996) is a Chinese judoka. In 2021, she competed in the women's 70 kg event at the 2020 Summer Olympics in Tokyo, Japan.

She is the bronze medallist of the 2021 Asian-Pacific Judo Championships in the -70 kg category.
