= Giovanna Scoccimarro =

German judoka (born 1997)

Personal information
- Born: 10 November 1997 (age 28) Vorsfelde, Germany
- Occupation: Judoka

Sport
- Country: Germany
- Sport: Judo
- Weight class: ‍–‍70 kg
- Rank: 3rd dan black belt

Achievements and titles
- Olympic Games: 5th (2020)
- World Champ.: (silver) (2023)
- European Champ.: (silver) (2017)
Medal record
Women's judo
Representing Germany
Olympic Games
Bronze medal – third place	2020 Tokyo	Mixed team
World Championships
Silver medal – second place	2023 Doha	‍–‍70 kg
Bronze medal – third place	2025 Budapest	Mixed team
Bronze medal – third place	2026 Baku	‍–‍70 kg
European Championships
Silver medal – second place	2017 Warsaw	‍–‍70 kg
World Masters
Bronze medal – third place	2021 Doha	‍–‍70 kg
IJF Grand Slam
Gold medal – first place	2021 Abu Dhabi	‍–‍70 kg
Silver medal – second place	2019 Brasilia	‍–‍70 kg
Silver medal – second place	2021 Kazan	‍–‍70 kg
Silver medal – second place	2026 Lausanne	‍–‍70 kg
Bronze medal – third place	2018 Abu Dhabi	‍–‍70 kg
Bronze medal – third place	2019 Osaka	‍–‍70 kg
Bronze medal – third place	2020 Düsseldorf	‍–‍70 kg
Bronze medal – third place	2023 Tbilisi	‍–‍70 kg
Bronze medal – third place	2025 Tashkent	‍–‍70 kg
IJF Grand Prix
Gold medal – first place	2019 Montreal	‍–‍70 kg
Silver medal – second place	2018 Tashkent	‍–‍70 kg
Bronze medal – third place	2019 Hohhot	‍–‍70 kg
Bronze medal – third place	2023 Linz	‍–‍70 kg
World Juniors Championships
Gold medal – first place	2017 Zagreb	‍–‍70 kg
European Cadet Championships
Gold medal – first place	2014 Athens	‍–‍70 kg

Profile at external databases
- IJF: 21871
- JudoInside.com: 80764
- Updated on 8 October 2026

Giovanna Scoccimarro (born 10 November 1997) is a German judoka. She is the 2017 European silver medalist in the 70 kg division. In 2021, she competed in the women's 70 kg event at the 2020 Summer Olympics in Tokyo, Japan.

In 2020, she competed in the women's 70 kg event at the 2020 European Judo Championships held in Prague, Czech Republic.

In 2021, she won one of the bronze medals in her event at the 2021 Judo World Masters held in Doha, Qatar. At the 2021 Judo Grand Slam Abu Dhabi held in Abu Dhabi, United Arab Emirates, she won the gold medal in her event.
