= Gemma Howell =

British judoka (born 1990)

Personal information
- Born: 13 June 1990 (age 36) Stafford, England
- Occupation: Judoka
- Height: 1.65 m (5 ft 5 in)

Sport
- Sport: Judo
- Weight class: ‍–‍63 kg, ‍–‍70 kg
- Club: Wolverhampton Judo Club
- Coached by: Bill Kelly
- Retired: 11 December 2023

Achievements and titles
- Olympic Games: R32 (2012, 2020)
- World Champ.: 7th (2010)
- European Champ.: (gold) (2022)
- Commonwealth Games: (silver) (2022)
Medal record
Women's judo
Representing Great Britain
European Championships
Gold medal – first place	2022 Sofia	‍–‍63 kg
Bronze medal – third place	2018 Tel Aviv	‍–‍70 kg
IJF Grand Slam
Silver medal – second place	2022 Tel Aviv	‍–‍63 kg
Bronze medal – third place	2019 Baku	‍–‍70 kg
Bronze medal – third place	2019 Brasilia	‍–‍70 kg
Bronze medal – third place	2020 Paris	‍–‍70 kg
IJF Grand Prix
Gold medal – first place	2019 Budapest	‍–‍70 kg
Gold medal – first place	2019 Zagreb	‍–‍70 kg
Silver medal – second place	2016 Tbilisi	‍–‍63 kg
Bronze medal – third place	2012 Baku	‍–‍63 kg
Bronze medal – third place	2012 Qingdao	‍–‍63 kg
Bronze medal – third place	2014 Zagreb	‍–‍63 kg
Bronze medal – third place	2017 Antalya	‍–‍70 kg
Bronze medal – third place	2017 Cancún	‍–‍70 kg
Bronze medal – third place	2018 Tunis	‍–‍70 kg
Bronze medal – third place	2018 Hohhot	‍–‍70 kg
European U23 Championships
Bronze medal – third place	2008 Zagreb	‍–‍57 kg
Bronze medal – third place	2010 Sarajevo	‍–‍57 kg
World Juniors Championships
Bronze medal – third place	2008 Bangkok	‍–‍57 kg
European Junior Championships
Bronze medal – third place	2008 Warsaw	‍–‍57 kg
Representing England
Commonwealth Games
Silver medal – second place	2022 Birmingham	‍–‍63 kg

Profile at external databases
- IJF: 1120
- JudoInside.com: 36101
- Updated on 12 December 2023

Gemma Howell (born 13 June 1990) is a British retired judoka from Stafford, England, who competed at the Olympic Games.

== Judo career ==
Howell came to prominence after winning the lightweight division at the British Judo Championships in 2006. As well as successfully defending the title in 2007 and 2008, she won medals at the 2008 World Junior and European Junior Championships. In 2010, she won a medal at the European U23 Championships before winning a fourth British title in 2011.

In 2012, Howell was selected to represent Great Britain at the 2012 Summer Olympics in London. She competed in the Women's 63 kg, but was defeated in the first round. The following year she won her fifth and last British Championship, this time at the heavier weight of half-middleweight. In 2014, Howell took three medals at the Heart of England Championships, the Zagreb Grand Prix and the European Open in Glasgow. She also represented Great Britain at the 2020 Summer Olympics in Tokyo, Japan, competing in the women's 70 kg event.

In May 2019, Howell was selected to compete at the 2019 European Games in Minsk, Belarus. She won the silver medal in her event at the 2022 Judo Grand Slam Tel Aviv held in Tel Aviv, Israel.

In 2022, Howell achieved her best success to date after winning the gold medal at the 2022 European Judo Championships in Sofia. Competing in the women's 63 kg she defeated Laura Fazliu in the final. Following this major success she then went on to win a silver medal in the 63 kg category at the 2022 Commonwealth Games in Birmingham.

In December 2023, she announced her retirement after a very successful career that also included eleven surgeries for injuries.
