= Megan Fletcher =

British judoka (born 1989)

Personal information
- Nationality: Irish
- Born: 2 August 1989 (age 36) Reading, England
- Education: The Emmbrook School; University of Bath
- Occupation: Judoka
- Height: 5 ft 7 in (170 cm) (2014)

Sport
- Country: Great Britain (until Feb. 2016); Ireland (since Apr. 2017)
- Sport: Judo
- Weight class: –70 kg

Achievements and titles
- Olympic Games: R32 (2020)
- World Champ.: 5th (2021)
- European Champ.: 7th (2019)
- Commonwealth Games: (gold) (2014)
Medal record
Women's judo
Representing Ireland
IJF Grand Prix
Silver medal – second place	2019 Marrakesh	‍–‍70 kg
Silver medal – second place	2019 Perth	‍–‍70 kg
Bronze medal – third place	2019 Tel Aviv	‍–‍70 kg
Bronze medal – third place	2019 Montreal	‍–‍70 kg
Representing Great Britain
European Cadet Championships
Bronze medal – third place	2005 Salzburg	‍–‍57 kg
Representing England
Commonwealth Games
Gold medal – first place	2014 Glasgow	‍–‍70 kg

Profile at external databases
- IJF: 38054, 3094
- JudoInside.com: 31873
- Updated on 21 May 2023

Megan Fletcher (born 2 August 1989) is an Irish judoka, who was born in England. She previously represented England and Great Britain judo at the international level before competing for the Republic of Ireland.

== Personal history ==
Megan Fletcher was born on 2 August 1989 in Reading, England. She was schooled at The Emmbrook School, in Wokingham, before going to the University of Bath, where she has trained since 2007 with Team Bath. As of 2014 she resides in Wokingham, which is where her club, Pinewood Judo Club, is located.

Besides judo, Fletcher is a trained geography teacher, and teaches part-time at The Castle School, Thornbury, South Gloucestershire.

== Judo career ==
Fletcher began judo at the age of 5, and became a first dan black belt at the age of 15. In 2011, Fletcher participated for Great Britain at the World University Games in China.

At the 2014 Commonwealth Games, held in Glasgow, Scotland, Fletcher beat Moira de Villiers of New Zealand in the 70 kilograms judo final, by ippon with tate shiho gatame. Fletcher reached the final despite the fact that she had her face taped up after suffering an injury to her nose against the "gold medal hope" Sally Conway of Scotland in the semi-finals; Conway was the British judo number one going into the tournament. After her victory in the final, Fletcher dedicated it to her sensei, Don Werner, who had been her coach at Pinewood and died in January 2014 of cancer. Fletcher's younger brother Ben Fletcher was due to compete in the judo 73 kilograms (161 lb) category, but a week before the event he suffered an injury and was forced to withdraw; he was replaced by Danny Williams. Megan is currently ranked 40th in the world in the 70 kg category by the International Judo Federation.

In 2020, she competed in the women's 70 kg event at the 2020 European Judo Championships held in Prague, Czech Republic. In 2021, she competed in the women's 70 kg event at the 2020 Summer Olympics in Tokyo, Japan.

Megan now works as a Geography teacher at The Castle School Thornbury.
