= Daria Pogorzelec =

Polish judoka (born 1990)

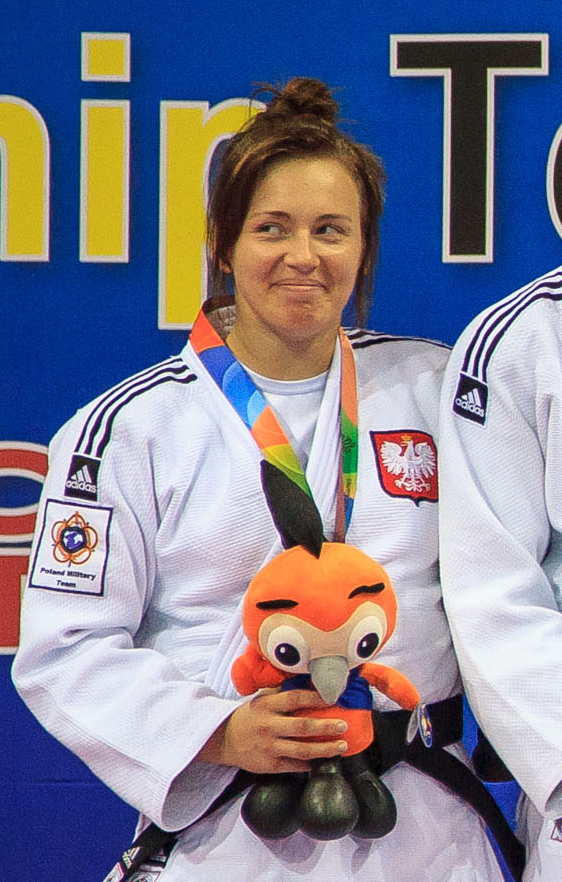
- Pogorzelec at the 2015 Military World Games

Personal information
- Born: 20 July 1990 (age 35) Gdańsk, Poland
- Occupation: Judoka
- Height: 172 cm (5 ft 8 in)

Sport
- Country: Poland
- Sport: Judo
- Weight class: ‍–‍70 kg
- Club: Wybrzeże Gdańsk

Achievements and titles
- Olympic Games: 7th (2012)
- World Champ.: 5th (2015)
- European Champ.: 5th (2010, 2019)
Medal record
Women's judo
Representing Poland
IJF Grand Slam
Bronze medal – third place	2014 Tyumen	‍–‍78 kg
Bronze medal – third place	2015 Baku	‍–‍78 kg
IJF Grand Prix
Gold medal – first place	2014 Tashkent	‍–‍78 kg
Bronze medal – third place	2010 Tunis	‍–‍78 kg
Bronze medal – third place	2015 Zagreb	‍–‍78 kg
Bronze medal – third place	2018 Cancún	‍–‍70 kg
European U23 Championships
Silver medal – second place	2010 Sarajevo	‍–‍78 kg
European Junior Championships
Bronze medal – third place	2006 Tallinn	‍–‍78 kg
European Cadet Championships
Bronze medal – third place	2005 Salzburg	‍–‍70 kg
Military World Games
Gold medal – first place	2011 Rio de Janeiro	‍–‍78 kg
Silver medal – second place	2015 Mungyeong	‍–‍78 kg
Silver medal – second place	2015 Mungyeong	+70 kg
Bronze medal – third place	2013 Astana	‍–‍78 kg

Profile at external databases
- IJF: 1622
- JudoInside.com: 33164
- Updated on 24 November 2022

Daria Pogorzelec (born 20 July 1990) is a Polish judoka who competed at the 2012 and 2016 Olympics.

At the 2012 Summer Olympics, Pogorzelec beat Anamari Velenšek in the first round of the women's half-heavyweight competition, then Heide Wollert before losing to Mayra Aguiar. Pogorzelec was entered into the bronze medal repechage, where she lost to Abigél Joó.

At the 2016 Summer Olympics, Pogorzelec beat Hortence Atangana before losing to Luise Malzahn,

In 2013, Pogorzelec won bronze at the World Military Games.
