= Bárbara Timo =

Brazilian-born Portuguese judoka

Personal information
- Full name: Bárbara Chianca Timo
- Born: 10 March 1991 (age 35) Rio de Janeiro, Brazil
- Occupation: Judoka
- Height: 1.68 m (5 ft 6 in)
- Website: www.barbaratimo.com

Sport
- Country: Brazil (until 2018); Portugal (since 2019)
- Sport: Judo
- Weight class: ‍–‍63 kg, ‍–‍70 kg
- Club: Benfica

Achievements and titles
- Olympic Games: R16 (2020)
- World Champ.: (silver) (2019)
- European Champ.: (bronze) (2021)
Medal record
Women's judo
Representing Portugal
World Championships
Silver medal – second place	2019 Tokyo	‍–‍70 kg
Bronze medal – third place	2022 Tashkent	‍–‍63 kg
European Games
Silver medal – second place	2019 Minsk	Mixed team
European Championships
Bronze medal – third place	2021 Lisbon	‍–‍70 kg
IJF Grand Slam
Gold medal – first place	2021 Paris	‍–‍63 kg
Silver medal – second place	2022 Abu Dhabi	‍–‍63 kg
Bronze medal – third place	2019 Paris	‍–‍70 kg
Bronze medal – third place	2020 Budapest	‍–‍70 kg
Bronze medal – third place	2022 Antalya	‍–‍63 kg
IJF Grand Prix
Gold medal – first place	2019 Tbilisi	‍–‍70 kg
Gold medal – first place	2023 Almada	‍–‍63 kg
Representing Brazil
IJF Grand Slam
Bronze medal – third place	2016 Abu Dhabi	‍–‍70 kg
Bronze medal – third place	2018 Ekaterinburg	‍–‍70 kg
IJF Grand Prix
Gold medal – first place	2013 Tashkent	‍–‍70 kg
Gold medal – first place	2017 Zagreb	‍–‍70 kg
Bronze medal – third place	2013 Almaty	‍–‍70 kg
Summer Universiade
Gold medal – first place	2017 Taipei	‍–‍70 kg

Profile at external databases
- IJF: 10872, 49625
- JudoInside.com: 71215
- Updated on 18 December 2024

Bárbara Chianca Timo (born 10 March 1991) is a Brazilian-born Portuguese judoka. She won a silver medal at the 2019 World Judo Championships. In 2021, she competed in the women's 70 kg event at the 2020 Summer Olympics in Tokyo, Japan. She won a gold medal at the 2023 Grand Prix Portugal.

In 2020, Timo competed in the women's 70 kg event at the European Judo Championships held in Prague, Czech Republic.
