= María Bernabéu =

Spanish judoka (born 1988)

Personal information
- Full name: María Bernabéu Avomo
- Nationality: Spanish; Equatoguinean
- Born: 15 February 1988 (age 38) Salamanca, Spain
- Home town: Alicante, Spain
- Occupation: Judoka
- Height: 1.70 m (5 ft 7 in)

Sport
- Country: Spain
- Sport: Judo
- Weight class: –70 kg

Achievements and titles
- Olympic Games: 5th (2016)
- World Champ.: (silver) (2015)
- European Champ.: 5th (2014, 2018)
Medal record
Women's judo
Representing Spain
World Championships
Silver medal – second place	2015 Astana	‍–‍70 kg
Bronze medal – third place	2017 Budapest	‍–‍70 kg
IJF Grand Slam
Gold medal – first place	2016 Baku	‍–‍70 kg
Bronze medal – third place	2019 Düsseldorf	‍–‍70 kg
Bronze medal – third place	2019 Baku	‍–‍70 kg
Bronze medal – third place	2021 Antalya	‍–‍70 kg
IJF Grand Prix
Gold medal – first place	2015 Budapest	‍–‍70 kg
Gold medal – first place	2017 Cancún	‍–‍70 kg
Silver medal – second place	2019 Budapest	‍–‍70 kg
European U23 Championships
Bronze medal – third place	2010 Sarajevo	‍–‍70 kg
European Junior Championships
Bronze medal – third place	2006 Tallinn	‍–‍70 kg
Mediterranean Games
Gold medal – first place	2018 Tarragona	‍–‍70 kg

Profile at external databases
- IJF: 3327
- JudoInside.com: 30013
- Updated on 27 June 2023

María Bernabéu Avomo (Note: In this Spanish name, the first or paternal surname is Bernabéu and the second or maternal family name is Avomo.) (born 15 February 1988) is a Spanish judoka of Equatoguinean descent. She currently competes for Spain, which she represented at the 2016 Summer Olympics. She competed in the women's 70 kg event at the 2020 Summer Olympics in Tokyo, Japan.

== Personal life ==
She was born in Salamanca, Spain to an Equatoguinean mother and a Spanish father from Alicante, where she lives.
