= Michaela Polleres =

Austrian judoka (born 1997)

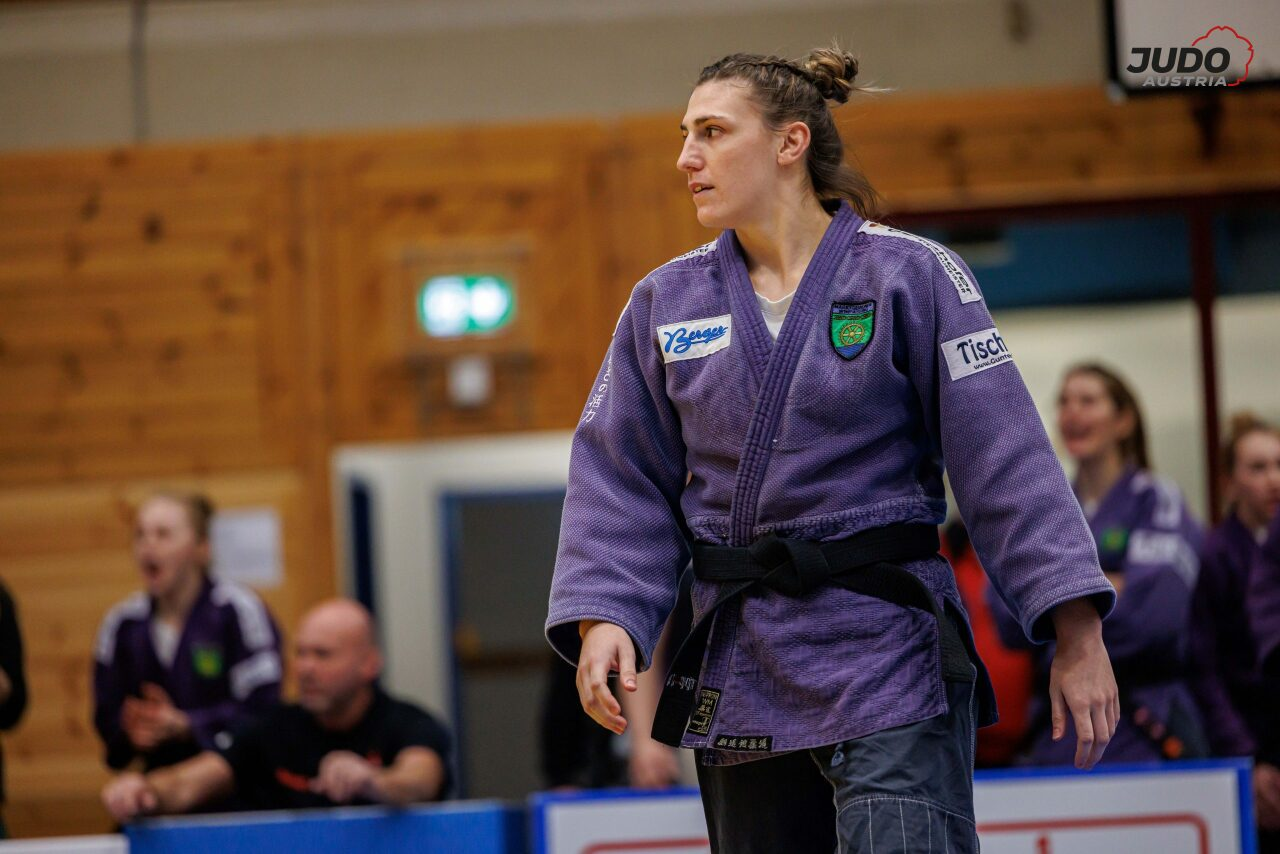
- Polleres participates in the Austrian Damen-Bundesliga 2022

Personal information
- Born: 15 July 1997 (age 29) Neunkirchen, Austria
- Occupation: Judoka
- Employer: Austrian Armed Forces
- Website: www.michipolleres.at

Sport
- Country: Austria
- Sport: Judo
- Weight class: –70 kg
- Rank: 4th dan black belt
- League: Frauen Judo Bundesliga
- Club: JC Wimpassing
- Coached by: Yvonne Snir-Bönisch

Achievements and titles
- Olympic Games: (silver) (2020)
- World Champ.: (silver) (2026)
- European Champ.: (bronze) (2018)
- Highest world ranking: 2
Medal record
Women's judo
Representing Austria
Olympic Games
Silver medal – second place	2020 Tokyo	‍–‍70 kg
Bronze medal – third place	2024 Paris	‍–‍70 kg
World Championships
Silver medal – second place	2026 Baku	‍–‍70 kg
Bronze medal – third place	2021 Budapest	‍–‍70 kg
Bronze medal – third place	2023 Doha	‍–‍70 kg
European Games
Bronze medal – third place	2019 Minsk	Mixed team
European Championships
Bronze medal – third place	2018 Tel Aviv	‍–‍70 kg
World Masters
Gold medal – first place	2022 Jerusalem	‍–‍70 kg
Bronze medal – third place	2018 Guangzhou	‍–‍70 kg
IJF Grand Slam
Gold medal – first place	2023 Tashkent	‍–‍70 kg
Gold medal – first place	2024 Antalya	‍–‍70 kg
Gold medal – first place	2024 Dushanbe	‍–‍70 kg
Silver medal – second place	2026 Dushanbe	‍–‍70 kg
Bronze medal – third place	2018 Abu Dhabi	‍–‍70 kg
Bronze medal – third place	2019 Abu Dhabi	‍–‍70 kg
Bronze medal – third place	2020 Budapest	‍–‍70 kg
Bronze medal – third place	2022 Baku	‍–‍70 kg
Bronze medal – third place	2026 Budapest	‍–‍70 kg
IJF Grand Prix
Gold medal – first place	2018 Cancún	‍–‍70 kg
Gold medal – first place	2018 Tashkent	‍–‍70 kg
Gold medal – first place	2026 Linz	‍–‍70 kg
Bronze medal – third place	2017 Zagreb	‍–‍70 kg
Bronze medal – third place	2018 Antalya	‍–‍70 kg
Bronze medal – third place	2019 Zagreb	‍–‍70 kg
Bronze medal – third place	2024 Linz	‍–‍70 kg
European U23 Championships
Gold medal – first place	2018 Győr	‍–‍70 kg
Silver medal – second place	2017 Podgorica	‍–‍70 kg
World Juniors Championships
Bronze medal – third place	2017 Zagreb	‍–‍70 kg
European Junior Championships
Silver medal – second place	2017 Maribor	‍–‍70 kg
Bronze medal – third place	2015 Oberwart	‍–‍70 kg
European Cadet Championships
Silver medal – second place	2014 Athens	‍–‍63 kg
Youth Olympic Games
Bronze medal – third place	2014 Nanjing	‍–‍63 kg

Profile at external databases
- IJF: 13682
- JudoInside.com: 86921
- Updated on 8 October 2026

Michaela Polleres (born 15 July 1997) is an Austrian judoka. In 2021, she won the silver medal in the women's 70 kg event at the 2020 Summer Olympics. She later earned a bronze medal at the 2024 Summer Olympics.

Polleres is also a three-time medalist at the World Judo Championships, with a silver at the 2026 Championships, as well as two bronzes at 2021 and 2023 editions. She is a bronze medalist at the 2018 European Championships. She is a third degree black belt.

== Career ==
Polleres won one of the bronze medals in the girls' 63 kg event at the 2014 Summer Youth Olympics held in Nanjing, China. She also competed in the mixed team event.

Polleres competed in the women's 70 kg event at the 2017 European Judo Championships held in Warsaw, Poland. She was eliminated in her second match by Sanne van Dijke of the Netherlands. In that same year, Polleres won the silver medal in the women's 70 kg event at the 2017 European U23 Judo Championships held in Podgorica, Montenegro.

In 2018, Polleres won the gold medal in the women's 70 kg event at the European U23 Judo Championships held in Győr, Hungary. She represented Austria at the 2019 European Games held in Minsk, Belarus. She won one of the bronze medals in the mixed team event.

In 2020, Polleres was eliminated in her first match in the women's 70 kg event at the European Judo Championships held in Prague, Czech Republic. She competed in the same event at the 2021 Judo World Masters held in Doha, Qatar.

In 2021, Polleres won one of the bronze medals in the women's 70 kg event at the World Judo Championships held in Budapest, Hungary. She won the silver medal in the women's 70 kg event at the 2020 Summer Olympics in Tokyo, Japan.

Polleres lost her bronze medal match in her event at the 2022 Judo Grand Slam Tel Aviv held in Tel Aviv, Israel. She won one of the bronze medals in the women's 70 kg event at the 2023 World Judo Championships held in Doha, Qatar. Two months later, she represented Austria at the 2023 European Games held in Poland without winning a medal. She also competed in the women's 70 kg event at the 2023 European Judo Championships held in Montpellier, France.

=== Olympic Games 2024 ===
In the qualification period for the 2024 Olympic Games, Polleres was able to collect 6268 points in the IJF Olympic Ranking. She took part in the 2024 Olympic Games both in the -70 kg weight class and in the mixed team (together with Lubjana Piovesana, Katharina Tanzer, Samuel Gaßner, Wachid Borchashvili and Aaron Fara). In the individual competition, she won bronze. The first encounter in the mixed team competition against Germany ended 4:1. The Austrian team therefore took 9th place.

For her success at the 2024 Olympic Games, she was awarded the fourth Dan by Judo Austria.
