= Sally Conway =

Scottish judoka (born 1987)

Personal information
- Nationality: British
- Born: 1 February 1987 (age 39) Bristol, England
- Occupation: Judoka
- Height: 1.70 m (5 ft 7 in)

Sport
- Country: Great Britain
- Sport: Judo
- Weight class: ‍–‍70 kg
- Rank: 5th dan black belt
- Now coaching: Sweden national judo team

Achievements and titles
- Olympic Games: (bronze) (2016)
- World Champ.: (bronze) (2019)
- European Champ.: (silver) (2018)
- Commonwealth Games: (bronze) (2014)
Medal record
Women's judo
Representing Great Britain
Olympic Games
| Bronze medal – third place | 2016 Rio de Janeiro | ‍–‍70 kg |
World Championships
| Bronze medal – third place | 2019 Tokyo | ‍–‍70 kg |
European Championships
| Silver medal – second place | 2018 Tel Aviv | ‍–‍70 kg |
IJF Grand Slam
| Gold medal – first place | 2015 Baku | ‍–‍70 kg |
| Gold medal – first place | 2018 Paris | ‍–‍70 kg |
| Gold medal – first place | 2019 Düsseldorf | ‍–‍70 kg |
| Silver medal – second place | 2014 Baku | ‍–‍70 kg |
| Bronze medal – third place | 2013 Baku | ‍–‍70 kg |
| Bronze medal – third place | 2016 Paris | ‍–‍70 kg |
IJF Grand Prix
| Gold medal – first place | 2013 Samsun | ‍–‍70 kg |
| Gold medal – first place | 2015 Jeju | ‍–‍70 kg |
| Gold medal – first place | 2018 The Hague | ‍–‍70 kg |
| Gold medal – first place | 2020 Tel Aviv | ‍–‍70 kg |
| Silver medal – second place | 2014 Düsseldorf | ‍–‍70 kg |
| Silver medal – second place | 2014 Samsun | ‍–‍70 kg |
| Silver medal – second place | 2015 Zagreb | ‍–‍70 kg |
| Silver medal – second place | 2017 Cancún | ‍–‍70 kg |
| Bronze medal – third place | 2013 Abu Dhabi | ‍–‍70 kg |
| Bronze medal – third place | 2013 Jeju | ‍–‍70 kg |
| Bronze medal – third place | 2015 Samsun | ‍–‍70 kg |
| Bronze medal – third place | 2018 Antalya | ‍–‍70 kg |
| Bronze medal – third place | 2018 Zagreb | ‍–‍70 kg |
| Bronze medal – third place | 2018 Budapest | ‍–‍70 kg |
European U23 Championships
| Bronze medal – third place | 2007 Salzburg | ‍–‍70 kg |
World Juniors Championships
| Silver medal – second place | 2006 Santo Domingo | ‍–‍78 kg |
Representing Scotland
Commonwealth Games
| Bronze medal – third place | 2014 Glasgow | ‍–‍70 kg |

Profile at external databases
- IJF: 107
- JudoInside.com: 22699
- Updated on 21 May 2023

Sally Conway (born 1 February 1987) is a Scottish retired judoka who competed for Team GB in the 2012 and the 2016 Summer Olympics in the women's 70 kg judo event. Conway won a bronze medal in the 2016 Olympics. She competed for Scotland at the 2014 Commonwealth Games, where she won a bronze medal at the women's 70 kg judo event. As of 2024, Conway coaches Sweden's national judo team.

== Biography ==
Conway was born in Bristol in 1987. Conway took up judo at the age of ten in her home town of Bristol. She trains at Judo Scotland's Edinburgh headquarters in Ratho, having previously trained at Bisham Abbey.

She competed for Scotland in the 2014 Commonwealth Games, where she won a bronze medal in the −70 kg division. At the 2012 Summer Olympics she beat Chad's Carine Ngarlemdana with an ippon score after scoring with a wazaari. She then lost to second seed Edith Bosch, to a wazari after being penalised with a shido for backing off.

In 2013, she won the Olympic Athlete of the Year from the British Olympic Association and Female Player of the Year at the British Judo Awards. She was the only Scot to be part of the British team sent to the 2016 Judo World Championships. Conway was selected for the 2016 European Championships.

She competed in the 2016 Summer Olympics in the 70 kg category, defeating Israel's Linda Bolder in the quarter-finals, and then defeating Austria's Bernadette Graf to win the bronze medal.

In May 2019, Conway was selected to compete at the 2019 European Games in Minsk, Belarus.

In August, Conway competed at the 2019 World Judo Championships held in Tokyo, Japan. She won her first three fight, losing to the eventual world champion Marie Eve Gahie of France, in the semi-final. She beat Austrian Michaela Polleres in the bronze medal fight, earning her first senior medal at the World Championships.

In February 2021 Conway announced her retirement from judo. She was seven times champion of Great Britain, winning the middleweight division at the British Judo Championships in 2004, 2006, 2007, 2011, 2012, 2013 and 2014.
