= Anna Bernholm =

Swedish judoka (born 1991)

Personal information
- Born: 5 March 1991 (age 35)
- Occupation: Judoka

Sport
- Country: Sweden
- Sport: Judo
- Weight class: ‍–‍70 kg
- Retired: 3 February 2024

Achievements and titles
- Olympic Games: R16 (2020)
- World Champ.: 5th (2019)
- European Champ.: (bronze) (2019)
Medal record
Women's judo
Representing Sweden
European Games
Bronze medal – third place	2019 Minsk	‍–‍70 kg
World Masters
Bronze medal – third place	2017 Saint Petersburg	‍–‍70 kg
IJF Grand Slam
Gold medal – first place	2017 Abu Dhabi	‍–‍70 kg
Silver medal – second place	2018 Osaka	‍–‍70 kg
Silver medal – second place	2019 Baku	‍–‍70 kg
Bronze medal – third place	2017 Ekaterinburg	‍–‍70 kg
Bronze medal – third place	2020 Paris	‍–‍70 kg
Bronze medal – third place	2021 Kazan	‍–‍70 kg
Bronze medal – third place	2023 Tashkent	‍–‍70 kg
IJF Grand Prix
Gold medal – first place	2018 Antalya	‍–‍70 kg
Gold medal – first place	2019 Tel Aviv	‍–‍70 kg
Silver medal – second place	2014 Astana	‍–‍63 kg
Silver medal – second place	2019 Hohhot	‍–‍70 kg
Bronze medal – third place	2012 Abu Dhabi	‍–‍63 kg
Bronze medal – third place	2013 Jeju	‍–‍63 kg
Bronze medal – third place	2015 Budapest	‍–‍63 kg
Bronze medal – third place	2017 Zagreb	‍–‍70 kg

Profile at external databases
- IJF: 3508
- JudoInside.com: 47667
- Updated on 21 May 2023

Anna Bernholm (born 5 March 1991) is a Swedish retired judoka. In 2021, she competed in the women's 70 kg event at the 2020 Summer Olympics in Tokyo, Japan.

Bernholm is the gold medalist of the 2017 Judo Grand Slam Abu Dhabi in the ‍–‍70 kg category.
