= Kim Polling =

Dutch-Italian judoka (born 1991)

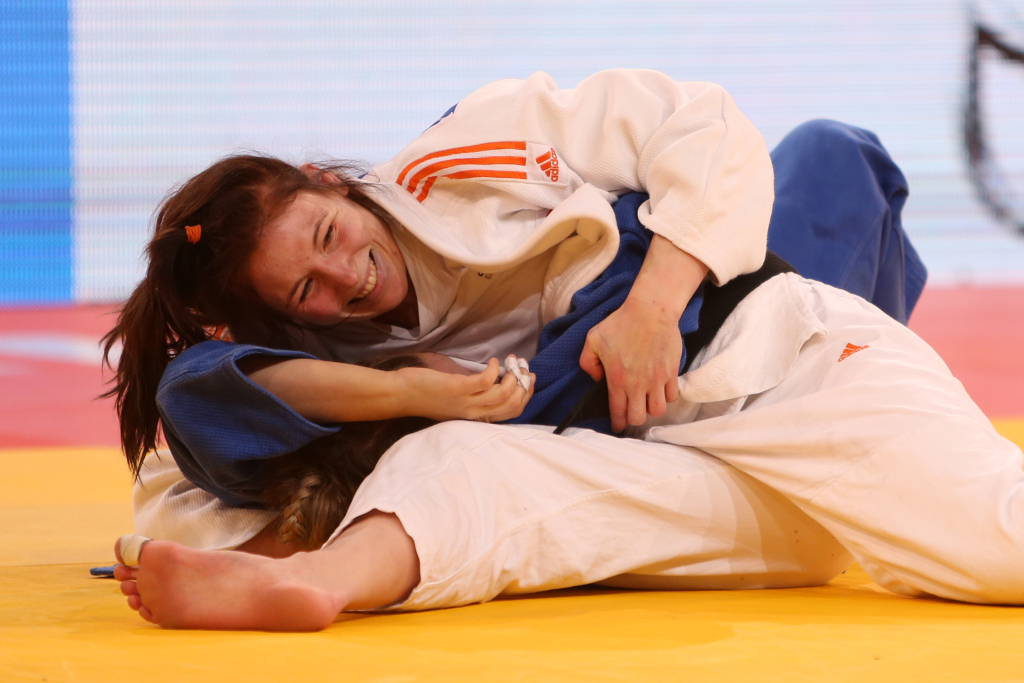
- Kim Polling in 2013

Personal information
- Born: 8 February 1991 (age 35) Zevenhuizen, Netherlands
- Occupation: Judoka
- Website: en.kimpolling.com

Sport
- Country: Netherlands (until March 2024); Italy (since April 2024)
- Sport: Judo
- Weight class: ‍–‍70 kg
- Coached by: Marjolein van Unen; Maarten Arens
- Retired: 21 January 2025

Achievements and titles
- Olympic Games: R16 (2016, 2024)
- World Champ.: (bronze) (2013)
- European Champ.: (gold) (2013, 2014, 2015, 2018)
Medal record
Women's judo
Representing Italy
World Championships
Bronze medal – third place	2024 Abu Dhabi	Mixed team
IJF Grand Slam
Bronze medal – third place	2024 Astana	‍–‍70 kg
Representing the Netherlands
World Championships
Bronze medal – third place	2013 Rio de Janeiro	‍–‍70 kg
Bronze medal – third place	2023 Doha	Mixed team
European Games
Gold medal – first place	2015 Baku	‍–‍70 kg
European Championships
Gold medal – first place	2013 Budapest	‍–‍70 kg
Gold medal – first place	2014 Montpellier	‍–‍70 kg
Gold medal – first place	2018 Tel Aviv	‍–‍70 kg
World Masters
Gold medal – first place	2013 Tyumen	‍–‍70 kg
Gold medal – first place	2015 Rabat	‍–‍70 kg
Gold medal – first place	2016 Guadalajara	‍–‍70 kg
Gold medal – first place	2019 Qingdao	‍–‍70 kg
Bronze medal – third place	2021 Doha	‍–‍70 kg
IJF Grand Slam
Gold medal – first place	2013 Paris	‍–‍70 kg
Gold medal – first place	2014 Baku	‍–‍70 kg
Gold medal – first place	2014 Tyumen	‍–‍70 kg
Gold medal – first place	2019 Abu Dhabi	‍–‍70 kg
Gold medal – first place	2021 Antalya	‍–‍70 kg
Silver medal – second place	2013 Tokyo	‍–‍70 kg
Silver medal – second place	2015 Baku	‍–‍70 kg
Silver medal – second place	2015 Abu Dhabi	‍–‍70 kg
Silver medal – second place	2017 Abu Dhabi	‍–‍70 kg
Silver medal – second place	2019 Osaka	‍–‍70 kg
Bronze medal – third place	2015 Paris	‍–‍70 kg
Bronze medal – third place	2018 Paris	‍–‍70 kg
Bronze medal – third place	2023 Paris	‍–‍70 kg
Bronze medal – third place	2023 Astana	‍–‍70 kg
IJF Grand Prix
Gold medal – first place	2013 Düsseldorf	‍–‍70 kg
Gold medal – first place	2013 Abu Dhabi	‍–‍70 kg
Gold medal – first place	2016 Tbilisi	‍–‍70 kg
Gold medal – first place	2017 The Hague	‍–‍70 kg
Gold medal – first place	2018 Tunis	‍–‍70 kg
Silver medal – second place	2019 Zagreb	‍–‍70 kg
World Juniors Championships
Gold medal – first place	2010 Agadir	‍–‍70 kg
European Junior Championships
Gold medal – first place	2010 Samokov	‍–‍70 kg
Silver medal – second place	2009 Yerevan	‍–‍70 kg
European Cadet Championships
Silver medal – second place	2007 Valletta	‍–‍70 kg
Summer Universiade
Gold medal – first place	2011 Shenzhen	‍–‍70 kg

Profile at external databases
- IJF: 3330, 83297
- JudoInside.com: 34188
- Updated on 31 July 2024

Kim Polling (born 8 February 1991) is a retired judoka who competed in the women's 70 kg division. Since April 2024, Polling represented Italy, having previously represented the Netherlands.

Quadruple European Champion Kim Polling was World #1 for 3 years. She bagged the gold at the 2021 Antalya Grand Slam. She won various different Grand Slams. She took gold at the 2019 Abu Dhabi Grand Slam and the 2017 The Hague Grand Prix. Polling was World and European Junior Champion in 2010. Polling took bronze at the 2013 World Championships. Polling won four Judo World Masters in 2013, 2015, 2016 and 2019. She took gold at the 2016 Tbilisi Grand Prix and at the 2018 Tunis Grand Prix.

In 2021, Polling won one of the bronze medals in her event at the 2021 World Masters held in Doha, Qatar.
