= Sanne van Dijke =

Dutch judoka (born 1995)

Sanne van Dijke OLY
Personal information
- Born: 21 July 1995 (age 30) Heeswijk-Dinther, Netherlands
- Occupation: Judoka
- Website: www.sannevandijke.nl

Sport
- Country: Netherlands
- Sport: Judo
- Weight class: ‍–‍70 kg

Achievements and titles
- Olympic Games: (bronze) (2020)
- World Champ.: (bronze) (2021, 2022, 2025)
- European Champ.: (gold) (2017, 2021)
Medal record
Women's judo
Representing the Netherlands
Olympic Games
Bronze medal – third place	2020 Tokyo	‍–‍70 kg
World Championships
Bronze medal – third place	2021 Budapest	‍–‍70 kg
Bronze medal – third place	2022 Tashkent	‍–‍70 kg
Bronze medal – third place	2023 Doha	Mixed team
Bronze medal – third place	2025 Budapest	‍–‍70 kg
European Games
Silver medal – second place	2019 Minsk	‍–‍70 kg
Bronze medal – third place	2023 Kraków	Mixed team
European Championships
Gold medal – first place	2017 Warsaw	‍–‍70 kg
Gold medal – first place	2021 Lisbon	‍–‍70 kg
Silver medal – second place	2020 Prague	‍–‍70 kg
Silver medal – second place	2022 Sofia	‍–‍70 kg
Silver medal – second place	2022 Mulhouse	Mixed team
Bronze medal – third place	2023 Montpellier	‍–‍70 kg
World Masters
Gold medal – first place	2023 Budapest	‍–‍70 kg
Silver medal – second place	2019 Qingdao	‍–‍70 kg
Bronze medal – third place	2018 Guangzhou	‍–‍70 kg
IJF Grand Slam
Gold medal – first place	2017 Ekaterinburg	‍–‍70 kg
Gold medal – first place	2022 Tbilisi	‍–‍70 kg
Gold medal – first place	2022 Baku	‍–‍70 kg
Gold medal – first place	2023 Tokyo	‍–‍70 kg
Silver medal – second place	2019 Abu Dhabi	‍–‍70 kg
Silver medal – second place	2022 Tel Aviv	‍–‍70 kg
Silver medal – second place	2023 Tbilisi	‍–‍70 kg
Silver medal – second place	2023 Astana	‍–‍70 kg
Silver medal – second place	2024 Tbilisi	‍–‍70 kg
Silver medal – second place	2025 Tbilisi	‍–‍70 kg
Bronze medal – third place	2017 Paris	‍–‍70 kg
Bronze medal – third place	2018 Düsseldorf	‍–‍70 kg
Bronze medal – third place	2021 Tel Aviv	‍–‍70 kg
Bronze medal – third place	2026 Astana	‍–‍70 kg
Bronze medal – third place	2026 Ulaanbaatar	‍–‍70 kg
IJF Grand Prix
Gold medal – first place	2018 Hohhot	‍–‍70 kg
Gold medal – first place	2024 Zagreb	‍–‍78 kg
Silver medal – second place	2017 The Hague	‍–‍70 kg
Silver medal – second place	2018 Budapest	‍–‍70 kg
Silver medal – second place	2018 The Hague	‍–‍70 kg
Bronze medal – third place	2015 Düsseldorf	‍–‍70 kg
Bronze medal – third place	2019 Tel Aviv	‍–‍70 kg
Bronze medal – third place	2019 Zagreb	‍–‍70 kg
European U23 Championships
Gold medal – first place	2014 Wrocław	‍–‍70 kg
European Junior Championships
Gold medal – first place	2014 Bucharest	‍–‍70 kg
Silver medal – second place	2015 Oberwart	‍–‍70 kg

Profile at external databases
- IJF: 7672
- JudoInside.com: 53826
- Updated on 21 June 2026

Sanne van Dijke (born 21 July 1995) is a Dutch judoka. She is the 2017 and 2021 European gold medalist in the 70 kg division. She won one of the bronze medals in the women's 70 kg event at the 2020 Summer Olympics in Tokyo, Japan. She is also a two-time bronze medalist in the women's 70 kg event at the World Judo Championships (2021 and 2022).

In 2020, Van Dijke won the silver medal in the women's 70 kg event at the European Judo Championships held in Prague, Czech Republic. She also won the silver medal in her event at the 2022 Judo Grand Slam Tel Aviv held in Tel Aviv, Israel.

Van Dijke won one of the bronze medals in the women's 70 kg event at the 2021 World Judo Championships held in Budapest, Hungary. She also won one of the bronze medals in the women's 70 kg event at the 2022 World Judo Championships held in Tashkent, Uzbekistan.

On 12 November 2022, Van Dijke won a silver medal at the 2022 European Mixed Team Judo Championships as part of team Netherlands.

Van Dijke lost her bronze medal match in the women's 70 kg event at the 2024 Summer Olympics in Paris, France.

She is openly lesbian and she is in a relationship with Natalie Powell from 2018.
