= 2018 World Judo Championships – Women's 57 kg =

Judo Women's 57 kg at the 2018 World Judo Championships
- Venue: National Gymnastics Arena
- Location: Baku, Azerbaijan
- Dates: 22 September
- Competitors: 52 from 42 nations
- Total prize money: 57,000€

Medalists
gold medal	Tsukasa Yoshida (1st title)	Japan
silver medal	Nekoda Smythe-Davis	Great Britain
bronze medal	Christa Deguchi	Canada
bronze medal	Dorjsürengiin Sumiyaa	Mongolia

Competition at external databases
- Links: IJF • JudoInside

The Women's 57 kg competition at the 2018 World Judo Championships was held on 22 September 2018.

== Results ==
=== Finals ===
Semi-finals
(Mongolia) Dorjsürengiin Sumiyaa	00
(United Kingdom) Nekoda Smythe-Davis	10
(Japan) Tsukasa Yoshida	01
(Canada) Christa Deguchi	00

Final
(United Kingdom) Nekoda Smythe-Davis	00
(Japan) Tsukasa Yoshida	10

=== Repechage ===
Repechage
(France) Hélène Receveaux	00
(Germany) Theresa Stoll	10

Third place
(Germany) Theresa Stoll	01
(Canada) Christa Deguchi	11

Repechage
(South Korea) Kwon You-jeong	01
(Kosovo) Nora Gjakova	00

Third place
(South Korea) Kwon You-jeong	00
(Mongolia) Dorjsürengiin Sumiyaa	01

=== Pool A ===
First round
(Serbia) Jovana Rogić	01
(Spain) Jaione Equisoain	00
(Brazil) Rafaela Silva	00
(Canada) Jessica Klimkait	01
(Nepal) Manita Shrestha	00
(Netherlands) Dewy Karthaus	10
(South Korea) Kim Ji-su	10
(China) Lu Tongjuan	00
(Kazakhstan) Sevara Nishanbayeva	00
(Bulgaria) Ivelina Ilieva	10

Second round
(Mongolia) Dorjsürengiin Sumiyaa	10
(Serbia) Jovana Rogić	00
(Cape Verde) Sandra Borges	00
(Canada) Jessica Klimkait	10
(France) Hélène Receveaux	10
(Netherlands) Dewy Karthaus	00
(South Korea) Kim Ji-su	00
(Bulgaria) Ivelina Ilieva	11

Third round
(Mongolia) Dorjsürengiin Sumiyaa	10
(Canada) Jessica Klimkait	00
(France) Hélène Receveaux	01
(Bulgaria) Ivelina Ilieva	00

Quarterfinals
(Mongolia) Dorjsürengiin Sumiyaa	01
(France) Hélène Receveaux	00

=== Pool B ===
First round
(Hong Kong) Leung Po Sum	00
(Venezuela) Wisneybi Machado	01
(Hungary) Hedvig Karakas	00
(North Korea) Kim Jin-a	10
(Panama) Miryam Roper	10
(Slovakia) Viktória Majorošová	00
(Slovenia) Kaja Kajzer	10
(Poland) Julia Kowalczyk	00
(Chinese Taipei) Lien Chen-ling	10
(United States) Amelia Fulgentes	00

Second round
(Germany) Theresa Stoll	10
(Venezuela) Wisneybi Machado	00
(North Korea) Kim Jin-a	00
(Panama) Miryam Roper	01
(United Kingdom) Nekoda Smythe-Davis	10
(Slovenia) Kaja Kajzer	00
(Belgium) Mina Libeer	00
(Chinese Taipei) Lien Chen-ling	10

Third round
(Germany) Theresa Stoll	10
(Panama) Miryam Roper	00
(United Kingdom) Nekoda Smythe-Davis	10
(Chinese Taipei) Lien Chen-ling	00

Quarterfinals
(Germany) Theresa Stoll	00
(United Kingdom) Nekoda Smythe-Davis	11

=== Pool C ===
First round
(Germany) Amelie Stoll	10
(Azerbaijan) Mönkhtsedeviin Ichinkhorloo	00
(Netherlands) Margriet Bergstra	00
(China) Zhang Wen	01
(Portugal) Telma Monteiro	11
(Jordan) Hadeel El-Almi	00
(Senegal) Ndeye Kamara	00
(Poland) Anna Borowska	11
(Uzbekistan) Amina Mamedova	00
(South Korea) Kwon You-jeong	10

Second round
(Japan) Tsukasa Yoshida	10
(Germany) Amelie Stoll	00
(China) Zhang Wen	00
(Portugal) Telma Monteiro	01
(Israel) Timna Nelson-Levy	01
(Poland) Anna Borowska	00
(Mongolia) Lkhagvatogoogiin Enkhriilen	00
(South Korea) Kwon You-jeong	01

Third round
(Japan) Tsukasa Yoshida	10
(Portugal) Telma Monteiro	00
(Israel) Timna Nelson-Levy	01
(South Korea) Kwon You-jeong	10

Quarterfinals
(Japan) Tsukasa Yoshida	10
(South Korea) Kwon You-jeong	00

=== Pool D ===
First round
(Morocco) Soumiya Iraoui	11
(Ivory Coast) Zouleiha Dabonne	00
(Ukraine) Mariia Skora	00
(Austria) Sabrina Filzmoser	10
(United States) Leilani Akiyama	00
(France) Priscilla Gneto	10
(North Korea) Ri Hyo-sun	10
(Madagascar) Brenda Andriatiana	00
(Russia) Anastasiia Konkina	00
(Romania) Corina Ștefan	11

Second round
(Kosovo) Nora Gjakova	11
(Morocco) Soumiya Iraoui	00
(Austria) Sabrina Filzmoser	00
(France) Priscilla Gneto	10
(Canada) Christa Deguchi	10
(North Korea) Ri Hyo-sun	00
(Cuba) Anailis Dorvigni	00
(Romania) Corina Ștefan	10

Third round
(Kosovo) Nora Gjakova	10
(France) Priscilla Gneto	00
(Canada) Christa Deguchi	10
(Romania) Corina Ștefan	00

Quarterfinals
(Kosovo) Nora Gjakova	00
(Canada) Christa Deguchi	01

== Prize money ==
The sums listed bring the total prizes awarded to €57,000 for the individual event.

Medal	Total	Judoka	Coach
Gold	€26,000	€20,800	€5,200
Silver	€15,000	€12,000	€3,000
Bronze	€8,000	€6,400	€1,600
