= 2019 World Judo Championships – Women's 57 kg =

Judo competition

Judo Women's 57 kg at the 2019 World Judo Championships
- Venue: Nippon Budokan
- Location: Tokyo, Japan
- Date: 27 August
- Competitors: 56 from 43 nations
- Total prize money: 57,000$

Medalists
| gold medal | Christa Deguchi (1st title) | Canada |
| silver medal | Tsukasa Yoshida | Japan |
| bronze medal | Julia Kowalczyk | Poland |
| bronze medal | Rafaela Silva | Brazil |

Competition at external databases
- Links: IJF • JudoInside

The Women's 57 kg competition at the 2019 World Judo Championships was held on 27 August 2019.

== Results ==
=== Finals ===
Semi-finals
(Japan) Tsukasa Yoshida | 10
(Brazil) Rafaela Silva | 00
(Canada) Christa Deguchi | 10
(Bulgaria) Ivelina Ilieva | 00

Final
(Japan) Tsukasa Yoshida | 00
(Canada) Christa Deguchi | 01

=== Repechage ===
Repechage
(Poland) Julia Kowalczyk | 10
(Russia) Daria Mezhetskaia | 01

Third place
(Poland) Julia Kowalczyk | 10
(Bulgaria) Ivelina Ilieva | 00

Repechage
(France) Sarah Cysique | 10
(Kosovo) Nora Gjakova | 00

Third place
(France) Sarah Cysique | 00
(Brazil) Rafaela Silva | 01

=== Pool A ===
First round
(Belgium) Mina Libeer | 00
(France) Hélène Receveaux | 10
(Ukraine) Mariia Skora | 00
(Netherlands) Sanne Verhagen | 10
(Germany) Pauline Starke | 10
(Pakistan) Amina Toyoda | 00
(Hong Kong) Yeung Nok Lam | 00
(Poland) Julia Kowalczyk | 10
(Serbia) Marica Perišić | 01
(South Korea) Kim Jan-di | 00

Second round
(Japan) Tsukasa Yoshida | 11
(France) Hélène Receveaux | 00
(Netherlands) Sanne Verhagen | 10
(Germany) Pauline Starke | 00
(Israel) Timna Nelson-Levy | 10
(United Arab Emirates) Maitha Mohamed | 00
(Poland) Julia Kowalczyk | 01
(Serbia) Marica Perišić | 00

Third round
(Japan) Tsukasa Yoshida | 10
(Netherlands) Sanne Verhagen | 00
(Israel) Timna Nelson-Levy | 00
(Poland) Julia Kowalczyk | 01

Quarterfinals
(Japan) Tsukasa Yoshida | 10
(Poland) Julia Kowalczyk | 01

=== Pool B ===
First round
(United States) Amelia Fulgentes | 00
(Ivory Coast) Zouleiha Dabonne | 10
(Portugal) Telma Monteiro | 10
(Philippines) Rena Furukawa | 00
(United Kingdom) Lele Nairne | 01
(Dominican Republic) Ana Rosa | 00
(Mongolia) Enkh-Otgon Losol | 00
(Russia) Daria Mezhetskaia | 10
(Azerbaijan) Mönkhtsedeviin Ichinkhorloo | 00
(Panama) Miryam Roper | 10
(Kazakhstan) Sevara Nishanbayeva | 10
(Vietnam) Nguyễn Ngọc Diễm Phương | 00

Second round
(Brazil) Rafaela Silva | 10
(Ivory Coast) Zouleiha Dabonne | 00
(Portugal) Telma Monteiro | 11
(United Kingdom) Lele Nairne | 00
(Canada) Jessica Klimkait | 00
(Russia) Daria Mezhetskaia | 10
(Panama) Miryam Roper | 10
(Kazakhstan) Sevara Nishanbayeva | 01

Third round
(Brazil) Rafaela Silva | 11
(Portugal) Telma Monteiro | 00
(Russia) Daria Mezhetskaia | 10
(Panama) Miryam Roper | 00

Quarterfinals
(Brazil) Rafaela Silva | 11
(Russia) Daria Mezhetskaia | 00

=== Pool C ===
First round
(Russia) Anastasia Konkina | 10
(Thailand) Yuriko Warasiha | 00
(China) Lu Tongjuan | 00
(Serbia) Jovana Rogić | 10
(Angola) Diassonema Mucungui | 10
(Madagascar) Brenda Andriatiana | 00
(Hong Kong) Leung Po Sum | 00
(Romania) Loredana Ohâi | 10
(Austria) Sabrina Filzmoser | 00
(France) Sarah Cysique | 11
(Poland) Anna Borowska | 10
(Jordan) Hadeel El-Almi | 00

Second round
(Canada) Christa Deguchi | 10
(Russia) Anastasia Konkina | 00
(Serbia) Jovana Rogić | 11
(Angola) Diassonema Mucungui | 00
(Germany) Theresa Stoll | 10
(Romania) Loredana Ohâi | 00
(France) Sarah Cysique | 10
(Poland) Anna Borowska | 00

Third round
(Canada) Christa Deguchi | 10
(Serbia) Jovana Rogić | 00
(Germany) Theresa Stoll | 00
(France) Sarah Cysique | 01

Quarterfinals
(Canada) Christa Deguchi | 10
(France) Sarah Cysique | 01

=== Pool D ===
First round
(New Zealand) Justine Bishop | 01
(Philippines) Megumi Delgado | 00
(Tunisia) Ghofran Khelifi | 10
(The Bahamas) Cynthia Rahming | 00
(Chinese Taipei) Lien Chen-ling | 10
(United States) Mariah Holguin | 00
(South Korea) Kim Ji-su | 10
(Nepal) Manita Shrestha | 00
(Portugal) Wilsa Gomes | 10
(India) Suchika Tariyal | 00
(Bulgaria) Ivelina Ilieva | 01
(Hungary) Hedvig Karakas | 00

Second round
(Kosovo) Nora Gjakova | 10
(New Zealand) Justine Bishop | 00
(Tunisia) Ghofran Khelifi | 00
(Chinese Taipei) Lien Chen-ling | 10
(United Kingdom) Nekoda Smythe-Davis | 01
(South Korea) Kim Ji-su | 10
(Portugal) Wilsa Gomes | 00
(Bulgaria) Ivelina Ilieva | 10

Third round
(Kosovo) Nora Gjakova | 01
(Chinese Taipei) Lien Chen-ling | 00
(South Korea) Kim Ji-su | 00
(Bulgaria) Ivelina Ilieva | 10

Quarterfinals
(Kosovo) Nora Gjakova | 01
(Bulgaria) Ivelina Ilieva | 10

== Prize money ==
The sums listed bring the total prizes awarded to $57,000 for the individual event.

| Medal | Total | Judoka | Coach |
|---|---|---|---|
| Gold | $26,000 | $20,800 | $5,200 |
| Silver | $15,000 | $12,000 | $3,000 |
| Bronze | $8,000 | $6,400 | $1,600 |
