= 2018 European Judo Championships – Women's 57 kg =

Judo competition

Judo Women's 57 kg at the 2018 European Judo Championships
- Venue: Expo Tel Aviv
- Location: Tel Aviv, Israel
- Date: 26 April

Medalists
gold medal	Nora Gjakova (1st title)	Kosovo
silver medal	Theresa Stoll	Germany
bronze medal	Anastasia Konkina	Russia
bronze medal	Telma Monteiro	Portugal

Competition at external databases
- Links: IJF • JudoInside

The women's 57 kg competition at the 2018 European Judo Championships was held on 26 April at the Expo Tel Aviv.

== Results ==
=== Finals ===
Semi-finals
Sarah-Léonie Cysique (FRA)	01
Theresa Stoll (GER)	10
Anastasia Konkina (RUS)	00
Nora Gjakova (KOS)	10

Final
Theresa Stoll (GER)	00
Nora Gjakova (KOS)	10

=== Repechage ===
Repechage
Daria Mezhetskaia (RUS)	01
Sabrina Filzmoser (AUT)	10

Third place
Sabrina Filzmoser (AUT)	00
Anastasia Konkina (RUS)	01

Repechage
Hedvig Karakas (HUN)	00
Telma Monteiro (POR)	10

Third place
Telma Monteiro (POR)	10
Sarah-Léonie Cysique (FRA)	00

=== Pool A ===
First round
Sarah-Léonie Cysique (FRA)	11
Martina Lo Giudice (ITA)	00
Anna Kuczera (POL)	10
Ulviyya Rahimli (AZE)	00
Daria Mezhetskaia (RUS)	10
Mina Libeer (BEL)	00

Round of 16
Nekoda Smythe-Davis (GBR)	00
Sarah-Léonie Cysique (FRA)	10
Anna Kuczera (POL)	00
Daria Mezhetskaia (RUS)	01

Quarterfinals
Sarah-Léonie Cysique (FRA)	11
Daria Mezhetskaia (RUS)	01

=== Pool B ===
First round
Timna Nelson-Levy (ISR)	01
Jovana Rogić (SRB)	00
Sabrina Filzmoser (AUT)	01
Kaja Kajzer (SLO)	00
Theresa Stoll (GER)	10
Manon Durbach (LUX)	00
Margriet Bergstra (NED)	10
Ivelina Ilieva (BUL)	01

Round of 16
Timna Nelson-Levy (ISR)	00
Sabrina Filzmoser (AUT)	10
Theresa Stoll (GER)	01
Margriet Bergstra (NED)	00

Quarterfinals
Sabrina Filzmoser (AUT)	00
Theresa Stoll (GER)	01

=== Pool C ===
First round
Jaione Equisoain (ESP)	00
Anastasia Konkina (RUS)	10
Hedvig Karakas (HUN)	01
Sanne Verhagen (NED)	00
Amelie Stoll (GER)	00
Loredana Ohâi (ROU)	10

Round of 16
Hélène Receveaux (FRA)	00
Anastasia Konkina (RUS)	01
Hedvig Karakas (HUN)	10
Loredana Ohâi (ROU)	00

Quarterfinals
Anastasia Konkina (RUS)	10
Hedvig Karakas (HUN)	00

=== Pool D ===
First round
Nora Gjakova (KOS)	10
Mönkhtsedeviin Ichinkhorloo (AZE)	00
Acelya Toprak (GBR)	10
Viktória Majorošová (SVK)	00
Telma Monteiro (POR)	11
Maayan Greenberg (ISR)	00
Julia Kowalczyk (POL)	00
Tena Šikić (CRO)	10

Round of 16
Nora Gjakova (KOS)	10
Acelya Toprak (GBR)	00
Telma Monteiro (POR)	10
Tena Šikić (CRO)	00

Quarterfinals
Nora Gjakova (KOS)	01
Telma Monteiro (POR)	00
