= 2017 World Judo Championships – Women's 57 kg =

Judo Women's 57 kg at the 2017 World Judo Championships
- Venue: László Papp Budapest Sports Arena
- Location: Budapest, Hungary
- Dates: 30 August
- Competitors: 50 from 42 nations
- Total prize money: 57,000$

Medalists
gold medal	Dorjsürengiin Sumiyaa (1st title)	Mongolia
silver medal	Tsukasa Yoshida	Japan
bronze medal	Hélène Receveaux	France
bronze medal	Nekoda Smythe-Davis	Great Britain

Competition at external databases
- Links: IJF • JudoInside

The Women's 57 kg competition at the 2017 World Judo Championships was held on 30 August 2017.

== Results ==
=== Finals ===
Semi-finals
(Mongolia) Dorjsürengiin Sumiyaa	10
(Panama) Miryam Roper	00
(Japan) Tsukasa Yoshida	10
(France) Hélène Receveaux	00

Final
(Mongolia) Dorjsürengiin Sumiyaa	01
(Japan) Tsukasa Yoshida	00

=== Repechage ===
Repechage
(South Korea) Kwon You-jeong	00
(Portugal) Telma Monteiro	02

Third place
(Portugal) Telma Monteiro	00
(France) Hélène Receveaux	01

Repechage
(Chinese Taipei) Lien Chen-ling	00
(United Kingdom) Nekoda Smythe-Davis	01

Third place
(United Kingdom) Nekoda Smythe-Davis	12
(Panama) Miryam Roper	00

=== Pool A ===
First round
(France) Priscilla Gneto	10
(Romania) Loredana Ohâi	00
(Azerbaijan) Sakina Zayirova	00
(Slovakia) Viktória Majorošová	01
(Benin) Zinhoue Akogbeto	00
(Hungary) Hedvig Karakas	10
(Bulgaria) Ivelina Ilieva	00
(South Korea) Kwon You-jeong	01

Second round
(Mongolia) Dorjsürengiin Sumiyaa	10
(France) Priscilla Gneto	00
(Hong Kong) Leung Po Sum	10
(Slovakia) Viktória Majorošová	00
(Kosovo) Nora Gjakova	01
(Hungary) Hedvig Karakas	00
(South Korea) Kwon You-jeong	10
(Dominican Republic) Ana Rosa	00

Third round
(Mongolia) Dorjsürengiin Sumiyaa	10
(Hong Kong) Leung Po Sum	00
(Kosovo) Nora Gjakova	00
(South Korea) Kwon You-jeong	01

Quarterfinals
(Mongolia) Dorjsürengiin Sumiyaa	01
(South Korea) Kwon You-jeong	00

=== Pool B ===
First round
(Netherlands) Margriet Bergstra	00
(Portugal) Telma Monteiro	10
(China) Lu Tongjuan	11
(Nepal) Manita Shrestha	00
(Georgia (country)) Mariam Janashvili	00
(Canada) Catherine Beauchemin-Pinard	10
(United Kingdom) Bekky Livesey	01
(Kazakhstan) Sevara Nishanbayeva	11
(United States) Marti Malloy	00
(Poland) Anna Borowska	00

Second round
(Brazil) Rafaela Silva	00
(Portugal) Telma Monteiro	01
(China) Lu Tongjuan	00
(Canada) Catherine Beauchemin-Pinard	01
(Panama) Miryam Roper	11
(United Kingdom) Bekky Livesey	00
(Morocco) Soumiya Iraoui	00
(United States) Marti Malloy	10

Third round
(Portugal) Telma Monteiro	01
(Canada) Catherine Beauchemin-Pinard	00
(Panama) Miryam Roper	01
(United States) Marti Malloy	00

Quarterfinals
(Portugal) Telma Monteiro	01
(Panama) Miryam Roper	02

=== Pool C ===
First round
(Kazakhstan) Anna Kazyulina	00
(Mongolia) Lkhagvatogoogiin Enkhriilen	11
(Austria) Sabrina Filzmoser	00
(Serbia) Jovana Rogić	01
(North Korea) Kim Jin-a	01
(United States) Amelia Fulgentes	00
(Ivory Coast) Zouleiha Dabonne	00
(Ukraine) Shushana Hevondian	10
(Germany) Amelie Stoll	12
(Cape Verde) Sandra Borges	00

Second round
(Japan) Tsukasa Yoshida	11
(Mongolia) Lkhagvatogoogiin Enkhriilen	00
(Serbia) Jovana Rogić	10
(North Korea) Kim Jin-a	00
(Chinese Taipei) Lien Chen-ling	10
(Ukraine) Shushana Hevondian	00
(Cuba) Anailys Dorvigny	01
(Germany) Amelie Stoll	00

Third round
(Japan) Tsukasa Yoshida	11
(Serbia) Jovana Rogić	00
(Chinese Taipei) Lien Chen-ling	10
(Cuba) Anailys Dorvigny	00

Quarterfinals
(Japan) Tsukasa Yoshida	00
(Chinese Taipei) Lien Chen-ling	00

=== Pool D ===
First round
(Spain) Jaione Equisoain	00
(Azerbaijan) Mönkhtsedeviin Ichinkhorloo	00
(Angola) Diassonema Mucugui	02
(Luxembourg) Manon Durbach	10
(Turkey) Nazlican Ozerler	00
(South Korea) Ji Yun-seo	10
(Russia) Irina Zabludina	10
(Kyrgyzstan) Kseniia Beldiagina	00

Second round
(France) Hélène Receveaux	10
(Spain) Jaione Equisoain	00
(Luxembourg) Manon Durbach	00
(South Korea) Ji Yun-seo	01
(Canada) Jessica Klimkait	10
(Algeria) Ratiba Tariket	00
(Russia) Irina Zabludina	00
(United Kingdom) Nekoda Smythe-Davis	10

Third round
(France) Hélène Receveaux	10
(South Korea) Ji Yun-seo	00
(Canada) Jessica Klimkait	01
(United Kingdom) Nekoda Smythe-Davis	10

Quarterfinals
(France) Hélène Receveaux	01
(United Kingdom) Nekoda Smythe-Davis	00

== Prize money ==
The sums listed bring the total prizes awarded to $57,000 for the individual event.

Medal	Total	Judoka	Coach
Gold	$26,000	$20,800	$5,200
Silver	$15,000	$12,000	$3,000
Bronze	$8,000	$6,400	$1,600
