= 2017 European Judo Championships – Women's 57 kg =

Judo competition

Judo Women's 57 kg at the 2017 European Judo Championships
- Venue: Torwar Hall
- Location: Warsaw, Poland
- Date: April 20, 2017
- Competitors: 20 from 15 nations

Medalists
gold medal	Priscilla Gneto (1st title)	France
silver medal	Theresa Stoll	Germany
bronze medal	Nora Gjakova	Kosovo
bronze medal	Helene Receveaux	France

Competition at external databases
- Links: IJF • JudoInside

The women's 57 kg competition at the 2017 European Judo Championships in Warsaw was held on 20 April at the Torwar Hall.

== Results ==
=== Finals ===
Semi-finals
Helene Receveaux (FRA)	000
Theresa Stoll (GER)	010
Nora Gjakova (KOS)	000
Priscilla Gneto (FRA)	010

Final
Theresa Stoll (GER)	000
Priscilla Gneto (FRA)	110

=== Repechages ===
Repechage		Bronze medal
Ivelina Ilieva (BUL)	010
Timna Nelson Levy (ISR)	000	Ivelina Ilieva (BUL)	000
		Nora Gjakova (KOS)	110

Repechage		Bronze medal
Bekky Livesey (GBR)	000
Irina Zabludina (RUS)	110	Irina Zabludina (RUS)	000
		Helene Receveaux (FRA)	100

=== Pool A ===
First round
Margriet Bergstra (NED)	020
Julia Kowalczyk (POL)	000

Second round
Helene Receveaux (FRA)	110
Tihea Topolovec (CRO)	000
Ivelina Ilieva (BUL)	010
Margriet Bergstra (NED)	000

Quarterfinals
Helene Receveaux (FRA)	100
Ivelina Ilieva (BUL)	000

=== Pool B ===
First round
Eteri Liparteliani (GEO)	100
Ibolya Siroki (HUN)	000

Second round
Timna Nelson Levy (ISR)	100
Dzestina Kutkaite (LTU)	010
Theresa Stoll (GER)	020
Eteri Liparteliani (GEO)	000

Quarterfinals
Timna Nelson Levy (ISR)	000
Theresa Stoll (GER)	100

=== Pool C ===
First round
Anastasija Michailova (LTU)	000
Bekky Livesey (GBR)	110

Second round
Nora Gjakova (KOS)	100
Anna Borowska (POL)	030
Anastasiia Konkina (RUS)	010
Bekky Livesey (GBR)	020

Quarterfinals
Nora Gjakova (KOS)	120
Bekky Livesey (GBR)	000

=== Pool D ===
First round		Second round		Quarterfinals
		Jovana Rogić (SRB)	000
Sappho Coban (GER)	000	Priscilla Gneto (FRA)	110
Priscilla Gneto (FRA)	100			Priscilla Gneto (FRA)	020
				Irina Zabludina (RUS)	000
		Irina Zabludina (RUS)	100
		Nazlican Ozerler (TUR)	000
