= Judo at the 2018 Asian Games – Women's 57 kg =

Judo competition

Women's 57 kg at the 2018 Asian Games
- Venue: Jakarta Convention Center
- Date: 30 August 2018
- Competitors: 17 from 17 nations

Medalists
gold medal	Momo Tamaoki	Japan
silver medal	Kim Jin-a	North Korea
bronze medal	Dorjsürengiin Sumiyaa	Mongolia
bronze medal	Lien Chen-ling	Chinese Taipei

The women's 57 kilograms (Lightweight) competition at the 2018 Asian Games in Jakarta was held on 30 August at the Jakarta Convention Center Assembly Hall.

== Schedule ==
All times are Western Indonesia Time (UTC+07:00)

Date	Time	Event
Thursday, 30 August 2018	09:00	Elimination round of 32
Thursday, 30 August 2018	09:00	Elimination round of 16
Thursday, 30 August 2018	09:00	Quarterfinals
Thursday, 30 August 2018	09:00	Repechage
Thursday, 30 August 2018	09:00	Semifinals
Thursday, 30 August 2018	16:00	Finals

== Results ==
=== Main bracket ===
==== Final ====
Gold medal contest
Kim Jin-a (PRK)	01
Momo Tamaoki (JPN)	10

==== Top half ====
Elimination round of 32
Nguyễn Thị Bích Ngọc (VIE)	10
Manita Shrestha Pradhan (NEP)	01

Elimination round of 16
Dorjsürengiin Sumiyaa (MGL)	10
Nguyễn Thị Bích Ngọc (VIE)	00
Kim Jin-a (PRK)	10
Amangul Allanazarova (UZB)	00
Sevara Nishanbayeva (KAZ)	10
Ni Kadek Anny Pandini (INA)	00
Leung Po Sum (HKG)	10
Megumi Kurayoshi (PHI)	00

Quarterfinals
Dorjsürengiin Sumiyaa (MGL)	00
Kim Jin-a (PRK)	10
Sevara Nishanbayeva (KAZ)	01
Leung Po Sum (HKG)	00

Semifinals
Kim Jin-a (PRK)	01
Sevara Nishanbayeva (KAZ)	00

==== Bottom half ====
Elimination round of 32

Elimination round of 16
Lien Chen-ling (TPE)	10
Chindamany Xayavongsa (LAO)	00
Lu Tongjuan (CHN)	10
Mobina Azizi (IRI)	00
Momo Tamaoki (JPN)	10
Yuriko Warasiha (THA)	00
Kim Jan-di (KOR)	10
Shohida Qalandarova (TJK)	00

Quarterfinals
Lien Chen-ling (TPE)	00
Lu Tongjuan (CHN)	01
Momo Tamaoki (JPN)	10
Kim Jan-di (KOR)	00

Semifinals
Lu Tongjuan (CHN)	00
Momo Tamaoki (JPN)	10

=== Repechage ===
Repechage
Dorjsürengiin Sumiyaa (MGL)	10
Leung Po Sum (HKG)	00
Lien Chen-ling (TPE)	10
Kim Jan-di (KOR)	00

Bronze medal contests
Dorjsürengiin Sumiyaa (MGL)	01
Lu Tongjuan (CHN)	00
Lien Chen-ling (TPE)	10
Sevara Nishanbayeva (KAZ)	00
