= Dorjsürengiin Sumiyaa =

Mongolian judoka (born 1991)

Personal information
- Born: 11 March 1991 (age 35) Baruunturuun, Uvs, Mongolia
- Occupation: Judoka
- Height: 1.62 m (5 ft 4 in)

Sport
- Country: Mongolia
- Sport: Judo
- Weight class: ‍–‍57 kg
- Club: Khilchin

Achievements and titles
- Olympic Games: (silver) (2016)
- World Champ.: (gold) (2017)
- Asian Champ.: (gold) (2016)
Medal record
Women's judo
Representing Mongolia
Olympic Games
Silver medal – second place	2016 Rio de Janeiro	‍–‍57 kg
World Championships
Gold medal – first place	2017 Budapest	‍–‍57 kg
Bronze medal – third place	2015 Astana	‍–‍57 kg
Bronze medal – third place	2018 Baku	‍–‍57 kg
Asian Games
Bronze medal – third place	2014 Incheon	‍–‍57 kg
Bronze medal – third place	2018 Jakarta	‍–‍57 kg
Asian Championships
Gold medal – first place	2016 Tashkent	‍–‍57 kg
Bronze medal – third place	2012 Tashkent	‍–‍57 kg
Bronze medal – third place	2013 Bangkok	‍–‍57 kg
World Masters
Gold medal – first place	2013 Tyumen	‍–‍57 kg
Gold medal – first place	2015 Rabat	‍–‍57 kg
Gold medal – first place	2016 Guadalajara	‍–‍57 kg
Gold medal – first place	2017 Saint Petersburg	‍–‍57 kg
IJF Grand Slam
Gold medal – first place	2017 Abu Dhabi	‍–‍57 kg
Silver medal – second place	2015 Paris	‍–‍57 kg
Silver medal – second place	2016 Paris	‍–‍57 kg
Silver medal – second place	2020 Paris	‍–‍57 kg
Bronze medal – third place	2013 Baku	‍–‍57 kg
Bronze medal – third place	2015 Tokyo	‍–‍57 kg
Bronze medal – third place	2016 Tokyo	‍–‍57 kg
Bronze medal – third place	2018 Ekaterinburg	‍–‍57 kg
Bronze medal – third place	2019 Düsseldorf	‍–‍57 kg
Bronze medal – third place	2019 Osaka	‍–‍57 kg
Bronze medal – third place	2020 Düsseldorf	‍–‍57 kg
IJF Grand Prix
Gold medal – first place	2012 Qingdao	‍–‍57 kg
Gold medal – first place	2013 Ulaanbaatar	‍–‍57 kg
Gold medal – first place	2015 Tbilisi	‍–‍57 kg
Gold medal – first place	2015 Ulaanbaatar	‍–‍57 kg
Gold medal – first place	2015 Qingdao	‍–‍57 kg
Silver medal – second place	2014 Düsseldorf	‍–‍57 kg
Silver medal – second place	2015 Düsseldorf	‍–‍57 kg
Silver medal – second place	2017 Düsseldorf	‍–‍57 kg
Silver medal – second place	2017 Hohhot	‍–‍57 kg
Bronze medal – third place	2012 Düsseldorf	‍–‍57 kg
Asian Junior Championships
Gold medal – first place	2010 Bangkok	‍–‍57 kg
Summer Universiade
Gold medal – first place	2015 Gwangju	‍–‍57 kg
Women's Sambo
World Championships
Gold medal – first place	2012 Minsk	‍–‍56 kg
Gold medal – first place	2013 Saint Petersburg	‍–‍56 kg
Gold medal – first place	2014 Narita	‍–‍56 kg

Profile at external databases
- IJF: 1540
- JudoInside.com: 67995
- Updated on 23 May 2023

Dorjsürengiin Sumiyaa or Sumiya Dorjsuren (Mongolian: Доржсүрэнгийн Сумъяа, born 11 March 1991) is a Mongolian judoka.

Dorjsürengiin competed in the 57 kg event at the 2012 Summer Olympics and lost in the first round. At Astana 2015, she won her first World Championships medal, a bronze. In the 2016 Olympics she won a silver medal in the women's 57 kg event and won gold at the 2017 World Championships in Budapest. In the 2017 World Championships final, Dorjsürengiin defeated Tsukasa Yoshida who had beaten her in the Olympic final. Dorjsürengiin won a bronze medal at the 2018 World Championships, after an unexpected loss in the semi-finals to Nekoda Smythe-Davis. She also competed in the women's 57 kg event at the 2020 Summer Olympics held in Tokyo, Japan.

Dorjsürengiin has also won multiple medals at the Asian Games (bronze in 2014 and 2018), Asian Championships (gold in 2016, bronze in 2012 and 2013) and is a four-time national champion.

Dorjsürengiin's life was the subject of the 2017 Mongolian film White Blessing.

== Personal life ==
She is a Muslim of Khoton.
