= Judo at the 2014 Asian Games – Women's 57 kg =

Judo competition

Women's 57 kg at the 2014 Asian Games
- Venue: Dowon Gymnasium
- Date: 21 September 2014
- Competitors: 13 from 13 nations

Medalists
| gold medal | Anzu Yamamoto | Japan |
| silver medal | Kim Jan-di | South Korea |
| bronze medal | Ri Hyo-sun | North Korea |
| bronze medal | Dorjsürengiin Sumiyaa | Mongolia |

The women's 57 kilograms (Lightweight) competition at the 2014 Asian Games in Incheon was held on 21 September 2014 at the Dowon Gymnasium.

Anzu Yamamoto of Japan won the gold medal.

== Schedule ==
All times are Korea Standard Time (UTC+09:00)

| Date | Time | Event |
|---|---|---|
| Sunday, 21 September 2014 | 14:00 | Elimination round of 16 |
| Sunday, 21 September 2014 | 14:00 | Quarterfinals |
| Sunday, 21 September 2014 | 14:00 | Semifinals |
| Sunday, 21 September 2014 | 14:00 | Final of repechage |
| Sunday, 21 September 2014 | 19:00 | Finals |

== Results ==
=== Main bracket ===
Elimination round of 16
Ri Hyo-sun (PRK) | 100
Cheang Ka Mei (MAC) | 000
Kim Jan-di (KOR) | 101
Habibeh Bayat (AFG) | 000
Zhou Ying (CHN) | 010
Meerim Momunova (KGZ) | 000
Karen Kwok (HKG) | 000
Zuhra Madraimowa (TKM) | 001
Nazgul Kubasheva (KAZ) | 000
Om Pongchaliew (THA) | 000

Quarterfinals
Dorjsürengiin Sumiyaa (MGL) | 000
Ri Hyo-sun (PRK) | 000
Kim Jan-di (KOR) | 100
Zhou Ying (CHN) | 000
Anzu Yamamoto (JPN) | 100
Zuhra Madraimowa (TKM) | 000
Lien Chen-ling (TPE) | 100
Om Pongchaliew (THA) | 000

Semifinals
Dorjsürengiin Sumiyaa (MGL) | 000
Kim Jan-di (KOR) | 100
Anzu Yamamoto (JPN) | 002
Lien Chen-ling (TPE) | 000

Gold medal contest
Kim Jan-di (KOR) | 000
Anzu Yamamoto (JPN) | 100

=== Repechage ===
Final of repechage
Ri Hyo-sun (PRK) | 001
Zhou Ying (CHN) | 000
Zuhra Madraimowa (TKM) | 011
Om Pongchaliew (THA) | 000

Bronze medal contests
Ri Hyo-sun (PRK) | 100
Lien Chen-ling (TPE) | 000
Zuhra Madraimowa (TKM) | 000
Dorjsürengiin Sumiyaa (MGL) | 101
