= Judo at the 2022 Asian Games – Women's 57 kg =

Judo competition

Judo Women's 57 kg at the 2022 Asian Games
- Venue: Xiaoshan Linpu Gymnasium
- Location: Hangzhou, China
- Dates: 25 September 2023
- Nations: 16

Medalists
gold medal	Lien Chen-ling	Chinese Taipei
silver medal	Momo Tamaoki	Japan
bronze medal	Maýsa Pardaýewa	Turkmenistan
bronze medal	Park Eun-song	South Korea

Competition at external databases
- Links: IJF • JudoInside

The women's 57 kilograms (half lightweight) competition in Judo at the 2022 Asian Games in Hangzhou was held on 25 September 2023 at the Xiaoshan Linpu Gymnasium.

== Schedule ==
All times are China Standard Time (UTC+08:00)

Date	Time	Event
Monday, 25 September 2023	10:00	Elimination round of 16
Monday, 25 September 2023	10:00	Quarterfinals
Monday, 25 September 2023	10:00	Repechage
Monday, 25 September 2023	10:00	Semifinals
Monday, 25 September 2023	16:00	Finals

== Results ==
=== Main bracket ===
Round of 16
~~Lkhagvatogoogiin Enkhriilen (MGL)~~
Park Eun-song (KOR)	w/o
Maýsa Pardaýewa (TKM)	11
Manita Shrestha Pradhan (NEP)	00
Momo Tamaoki (JPN)	10
Rena Furukawa (PHI)	00
Shukurjon Aminova (UZB)	10
Nguyễn Thị Bích Ngọc (VIE)	00
Lien Chen-ling (TPE)	10
Zhanar Zholdosheva (KGZ)	00
Sevara Nishanbayeva (KAZ)	10 (yellow card)
Fazilat Gulboeva (TJK)	00 (yellow card)
Cai Qi (CHN)	10 (yellow card)
Yeung Nok Lam (HKG)	00
Altantsetseg Batsukh (UAE)	11
Clemence-June Frazey (LAO)	00

Quarter-finals
Park Eun-song (KOR)	01
Maýsa Pardaýewa (TKM)	00
Momo Tamaoki (JPN)	10
Shukurjon Aminova (UZB)	00
Lien Chen-ling (TPE)	10
Sevara Nishanbayeva (KAZ)	00
Cai Qi (CHN)	10 (yellow card)
Altantsetseg Batsukh (UAE)	00 (yellow card)

Semi-finals
Park Eun-song (KOR)	00
Momo Tamaoki (JPN)	10 (yellow card)
Lien Chen-ling (TPE)	10
Cai Qi (CHN)	00

Gold medal contest
Momo Tamaoki (JPN)	00
Lien Chen-ling (TPE)	01

=== Repechage ===
Repechage
Maýsa Pardaýewa (TKM)	10
Shukurjon Aminova (UZB)	00 (yellow card)
Sevara Nishanbayeva (KAZ)	00
Altantsetseg Batsukh (UAE)	10 (yellow card)

Bronze medal contests
Maýsa Pardaýewa (TKM)	11
Cai Qi (CHN)	00 (yellow card)
Altantsetseg Batsukh (UAE)	00
Park Eun-song (KOR)	10 (yellow card)
