= Kim Min-jeong (judoka) =

South Korean judoka (born 1988)

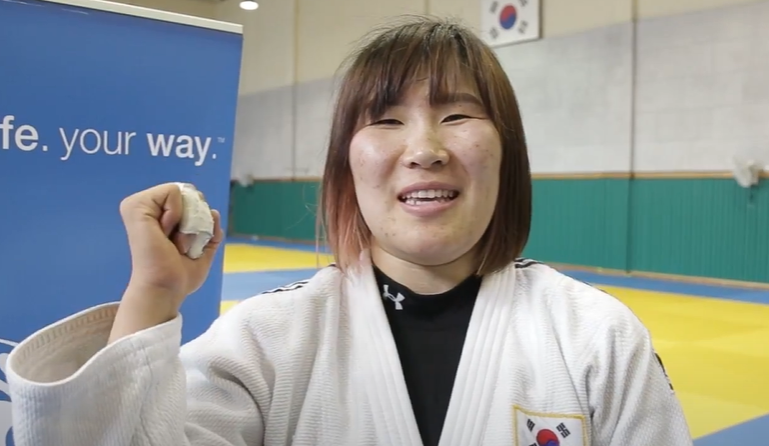

Personal information
- Born: 8 August 1988 (age 37)
- Occupation: Judoka
- Height: 1.79 m (5 ft 10 in)
- Weight: 95 kg (209 lb)

Sport
- Country: South Korea
- Sport: Judo
- Weight class: +78 kg

Achievements and titles
- Olympic Games: 5th (2016)
- World Champ.: (bronze) (2017)
- Asian Champ.: (gold) (2016, 2019)
Medal record
Women's judo
Representing South Korea
World Championships
Bronze medal – third place	2017 Budapest	+78 kg
Asian Games
Silver medal – second place	2014 Incheon	Women's team
Silver medal – second place	2018 Jakarta	+78 kg
Bronze medal – third place	2014 Incheon	+78 kg
Asian Championships
Gold medal – first place	2016 Tashkent	+78 kg
Gold medal – first place	2019 Fujairah	+78 kg
Silver medal – second place	2015 Kuwait City	+78 kg
Silver medal – second place	2017 Hong Kong	+78 kg
World Masters
Gold medal – first place	2017 Saint Petersburg	+78 kg
IJF Grand Slam
Gold medal – first place	2014 Baku	+78 kg
Gold medal – first place	2018 Paris	+78 kg
Bronze medal – third place	2013 Paris	+78 kg
Bronze medal – third place	2017 Paris	+78 kg
Bronze medal – third place	2017 Tokyo	+78 kg
Bronze medal – third place	2019 Paris	+78 kg
IJF Grand Prix
Gold medal – first place	2013 Jeju	+78 kg
Gold medal – first place	2014 Ulaanbaatar	+78 kg
Gold medal – first place	2015 Tashkent	+78 kg
Silver medal – second place	2018 Hohhot	+78 kg
Bronze medal – third place	2015 Qingdao	+78 kg
Bronze medal – third place	2015 Jeju	+78 kg
Bronze medal – third place	2016 Düsseldorf	+78 kg
Summer Universiade
Gold medal – first place	2013 Kazan	Women's team
Silver medal – second place	2015 Gwangju	+78 kg

Profile at external databases
- IJF: 10048
- JudoInside.com: 98458
- Updated on 27 June 2023

Kim Min-jeong also known as Kim Eun-kyeong (Hanja:金 敏情, born 8 August 1988) is a South Korean judoka.

She competed at the 2016 Summer Olympics in Rio de Janeiro, in the women's +78 kg.
