= Manita Shrestha Pradhan =

Nepalese judoka (born 1999)

Personal information
- Born: 1 June 1999 (age 27) Panchthar, Nepal
- Occupation: Judoka

Sport
- Country: Nepal
- Sport: Judo
- Weight class: ‍–‍57 kg

Achievements and titles
- Olympic Games: R32 (2024)
- World Champ.: R64 (2017, 2018, 2019)
- Asian Champ.: R16 (2016, 2017, 2019, 2023, 2024)
Medal record
Women's judo
Representing Nepal
Asian Junior Championships
Bronze medal – third place	2017 Bishkek	‍–‍57 kg
Asian Cadet Championships
Bronze medal – third place	2016 Kochi	‍–‍57 kg
South Asian Games
Silver medal – second place	2016 Shillong	‍–‍57 kg

Profile at external databases
- IJF: 28333
- JudoInside.com: 100638
- Updated on 29 July 2024

Manita Shrestha Pradhan (born 1 June 1999) is a Nepalese judoka.

== Early life ==
Born in Panchthar, she stayed as a child at Prisoners Aid Mission in Kathmandu. She started judo in 2009. She attended Bal Bikas Secondary School in Ranibari, Kathmandu.

== Career ==
She won a silver medal in the 57 kg category at the 2016 South Asian Games in Shillong, India. In 2017, she won a bronze medal in the women's below-57 kg weight category in the 11th Asian Cadet and 18th Juniors Asian Judo Championships in Bishkek, Kyrgyzstan.

She became the first Nepali woman judoka to win a bout at the Asian Judo Championships, in Hong Kong in May 2017. She competed at the 2018 Asian Games in Jakarta, Indonesia. She was selected for the World Judo Championship in Tokyo, in August 2019.

Coached by Devu Thapa, she received a scholarship from the Nepalese Olympic Committee in 2022. She competed at the 2022 Asian Games in Hangzhou, China.

She was selected for the 2024 Paris Olympics in July 2024 in the -57 kg category.
