= Bekky Livesey =

British judoka (born 1995)

Personal information
- Nationality: British (English)
- Born: 19 September 1995 (age 30)
- Occupation: Judoka

Sport
- Country: Great Britain
- Sport: Judo
- Weight class: –57 kg

Achievements and titles
- World Champ.: R64 (2017)
- European Champ.: 7th (2017)
Medal record
Women's judo
Representing Great Britain
IJF Grand Prix
Bronze medal – third place	2016 Zagreb	–57 kg
Bronze medal – third place	2017 Antalya	–57 kg
European Junior Championships
Bronze medal – third place	2015 Oberwart	–57 kg

Profile at external databases
- IJF: 14780
- JudoInside.com: 67785
- Updated on 7 December 2022

Bekky Livesey (born 19 September 1995) is a British judoka.

== Judo career ==
She is the bronze medallist of the 2017 Judo Grand Prix Antalya in the -57 kg category. She became champion of Great Britain, winning the half-middleweight division at the British Judo Championships in 2019.

== Personal history ==
Bekky Livesey has a sister named Amy Livesey, who has won British championships at half-middleweight and a brother Owen Livesey, who is a three-times British champion at half-middleweight.
