= 2016 Judo Grand Slam Baku =

Judo competition

Judo 2016 Judo Grand Slam Baku
- Venue: Heydar Aliyev Sports and Exhibition Complex
- Location: Baku, Azerbaijan
- Dates: 6–8 May 2016
- Competitors: 447 from 76 nations

Competition at external databases
- Links: IJF • EJU • JudoInside

The 2016 Judo Grand Slam Baku was held in Baku, Azerbaijan, from 6 to 8 May 2016.

== Medal summary ==
=== Men's events ===
Event	Gold	Silver	Bronze
Extra-lightweight (−60 kg)	Ganbatyn Boldbaatar (MGL)	Ryuju Nagayama (JPN)	Ashley McKenzie (GBR)
Extra-lightweight (−60 kg)	Ganbatyn Boldbaatar (MGL)	Ryuju Nagayama (JPN)	Diyorbek Urozboev (UZB)
Half-lightweight (−66 kg)	Mikhail Pulyaev (RUS)	Azamat Mukanov (KAZ)	Tarlan Karimov (AZE)
Half-lightweight (−66 kg)	Mikhail Pulyaev (RUS)	Azamat Mukanov (KAZ)	Sugoi Uriarte (ESP)
Lightweight (−73 kg)	Mirali Sharipov (UZB)	Giyosjon Boboev (UZB)	Rustam Orujov (AZE)
Lightweight (−73 kg)	Mirali Sharipov (UZB)	Giyosjon Boboev (UZB)	Sai Yinjirigala (CHN)
Half-middleweight (−81 kg)	Takanori Nagase (JPN)	Ivaylo Ivanov (BUL)	Matteo Marconcini (ITA)
Half-middleweight (−81 kg)	Takanori Nagase (JPN)	Ivaylo Ivanov (BUL)	Iván Felipe Silva Morales (CUB)
Middleweight (−90 kg)	Marcus Nyman (SWE)	Aleksandar Kukolj (SRB)	Axel Clerget (FRA)
Middleweight (−90 kg)	Marcus Nyman (SWE)	Aleksandar Kukolj (SRB)	Kirill Denisov (RUS)
Half-heavyweight (−100 kg)	Beka Gviniashvili (GEO)	Miklós Cirjenics (HUN)	Dimitri Peters (GER)
Half-heavyweight (−100 kg)	Beka Gviniashvili (GEO)	Miklós Cirjenics (HUN)	Aaron Wolf (JPN)
Heavyweight (+100 kg)	Iakiv Khammo (UKR)	Roy Meyer (NED)	David Moura (BRA)
Heavyweight (+100 kg)	Iakiv Khammo (UKR)	Roy Meyer (NED)	Barna Bor (HUN)

=== Women's events ===
Event	Gold	Silver	Bronze
Extra-lightweight (−48 kg)	Julia Figueroa (ESP)	Éva Csernoviczki (HUN)	Otgontsetseg Galbadrakh (KAZ)
Extra-lightweight (−48 kg)	Julia Figueroa (ESP)	Éva Csernoviczki (HUN)	Laëtitia Payet (FRA)
Half-lightweight (−52 kg)	Gili Cohen (ISR)	Odette Giuffrida (ITA)	Ma Yingnan (CHN)
Half-lightweight (−52 kg)	Gili Cohen (ISR)	Odette Giuffrida (ITA)	Mönkhbaataryn Bundmaa (MGL)
Lightweight (−57 kg)	Tsukasa Yoshida (JPN)	Nekoda Smythe-Davis (GBR)	Lu Tongjuan (CHN)
Lightweight (−57 kg)	Tsukasa Yoshida (JPN)	Nekoda Smythe-Davis (GBR)	Sabrina Filzmoser (AUT)
Half-middleweight (−63 kg)	Alice Schlesinger (GBR)	Marijana Mišković Hasanbegović (CRO)	Maricet Espinosa (CUB)
Half-middleweight (−63 kg)	Alice Schlesinger (GBR)	Marijana Mišković Hasanbegović (CRO)	Büşra Katipoğlu (TUR)
Middleweight (−70 kg)	María Bernabéu (ESP)	Maria Portela (BRA)	María Pérez (PUR)
Middleweight (−70 kg)	María Bernabéu (ESP)	Maria Portela (BRA)	Elvismar Rodríguez (VEN)
Half-heavyweight (−78 kg)	Guusje Steenhuis (NED)	Marhinde Verkerk (NED)	Mami Umeki (JPN)
Half-heavyweight (−78 kg)	Guusje Steenhuis (NED)	Marhinde Verkerk (NED)	Luise Malzahn (GER)
Heavyweight (+78 kg)	Kanae Yamabe (JPN)	Yu Song (CHN)	Émilie Andéol (FRA)
Heavyweight (+78 kg)	Kanae Yamabe (JPN)	Yu Song (CHN)	Nihel Cheikh Rouhou (TUN)

Source Results

=== Medal table ===
* Host nation (Azerbaijan)

Rank	Nation	Gold	Silver	Bronze	Total
1	Japan (JPN)	3	1	2	6
2	Spain (ESP)	2	0	1	3
3	Netherlands (NED)	1	2	0	3
4	Great Britain (GBR)	1	1	1	3
4	Uzbekistan (UZB)	1	1	1	3
6	Mongolia (MGL)	1	0	1	2
6	Russia (RUS)	1	0	1	2
8	Georgia (GEO)	1	0	0	1
8	Israel (ISR)	1	0	0	1
8	Sweden (SWE)	1	0	0	1
8	Ukraine (UKR)	1	0	0	1
12	Hungary (HUN)	0	2	1	3
13	China (CHN)	0	1	3	4
14	Brazil (BRA)	0	1	1	2
14	Italy (ITA)	0	1	1	2
14	Kazakhstan (KAZ)	0	1	1	2
17	Bulgaria (BUL)	0	1	0	1
17	Croatia (CRO)	0	1	0	1
17	Serbia (SRB)	0	1	0	1
20	France (FRA)	0	0	3	3
21	Azerbaijan (AZE)*	0	0	2	2
21	Cuba (CUB)	0	0	2	2
21	Germany (GER)	0	0	2	2
24	Austria (AUT)	0	0	1	1
24	Puerto Rico (PUR)	0	0	1	1
24	Tunisia (TUN)	0	0	1	1
24	Turkey (TUR)	0	0	1	1
24	Venezuela (VEN)	0	0	1	1
Totals (28 entries)		14	14	28	56
