= Tena Šikić =

Croatian judoka

Personal information
- Nationality: Croatian
- Born: 4 July 1994 (age 31)
- Occupation: Judoka

Sport
- Country: Croatia
- Sport: Judo
- Weight class: –52 kg, –57 kg

Achievements and titles
- World Champ.: R32 (2017)
- European Champ.: R16 (2018)
Medal record
Women's judo
Representing Croatia
IJF Grand Slam
Bronze medal – third place	2016 Tyumen	–52 kg
IJF Grand Prix
Bronze medal – third place	2016 Ulaanbaatar	–52 kg
Bronze medal – third place	2016 Tashkent	–52 kg
European U23 Championships
Silver medal – second place	2015 Bratislava	–52 kg

Profile at external databases
- IJF: 14633
- JudoInside.com: 50466
- Updated on 25 November 2022

Tena Šikić (born 4 July 1994) is a Croatian judoka.

She is the bronze medallist of the 2016 Judo Grand Prix Tashkent in the -52 kg category.
