= 2026 Judo World Masters =

Judo competition

Judo 2026 Judo World Masters
- Venue: Tennis and water sports palace
- Location: Dushanbe, Tajikistan
- Dates: 18–20 December 2026
- Total prize money: €499,800

Competition at external databases
- Links: IJF • JudoInside

The 2026 Judo World Masters will be held at the Tennis and water sports palace in Dushanbe, Tajikistan, from 18 to 20 December 2026 as part of the IJF World Tour and during the 2028 Summer Olympics qualification period.

== Medal summary ==
=== Men's events ===
Event	Gold	Silver	Bronze
Extra-lightweight (−60 kg)			
Half-lightweight (−66 kg)			
Lightweight (−73 kg)			
Half-middleweight (−81 kg)			
Middleweight (−90 kg)			
Half-heavyweight (−100 kg)			
Heavyweight (+100 kg)			

=== Women's events ===
Event	Gold	Silver	Bronze
Extra-lightweight (−48 kg)			
Half-lightweight (−52 kg)			
Lightweight (−57 kg)			
Half-middleweight (−63 kg)			
Middleweight (−70 kg)			
Half-heavyweight (−78 kg)			
Heavyweight (+78 kg)			

=== Medal table ===
* Host nation (Tajikistan)

Rank	Nation	Gold	Silver	Bronze	Total
Totals (0 entries)		0	0	0	0

== Prize money ==
The sums written are per medalist, bringing the total prizes awarded to €499,800. (retrieved from:)

Medal	Total	Judoka	Coach
Gold	€15,300	€12,240	€3,060
Silver	€10,200	€8,160	€2,040
Bronze	€5,100	€4,080	€1,020
