= Amelie Stoll =

German judoka (born 1995)

Personal information
- Born: 21 November 1995 (age 30)
- Occupation: Judoka

Sport
- Country: Germany
- Sport: Judo
- Weight class: ‍–‍57 kg

Achievements and titles
- World Champ.: R32 (2017, 2018)
- European Champ.: R32 (2018)
Medal record
Women's judo
Representing Germany
IJF Grand Prix
Bronze medal – third place	2017 The Hague	‍–‍57 kg
Bronze medal – third place	2018 Tbilisi	‍–‍57 kg
Bronze medal – third place	2018 Tashkent	‍–‍57 kg
European U23 Championships
Gold medal – first place	2017 Podgorica	‍–‍57 kg

Profile at external databases
- IJF: 19880
- JudoInside.com: 82681
- Updated on 30 November 2022

Amelie Stoll (born 21 November 1995) is a German judoka.

Stoll is a bronze medalist from the 2017 Judo Grand Prix The Hague in the ‍–‍57 kg category.
