= Onise Bughadze =

Georgian judoka (born 1991)

Personal information
- Nationality: Georgian
- Born: 12 January 1991 (age 35)
- Occupation: Judoka

Sport
- Country: Georgia
- Sport: Judo
- Weight class: +100 kg
Medal record
Men's judo
Representing Georgia
IJF Grand Slam
Bronze medal – third place	2017 Baku	+100 kg
IJF Grand Prix
Bronze medal – third place	2019 Tbilisi	+100 kg

Profile at external databases
- IJF: 3738
- JudoInside.com: 83598
- Updated on 25 November 2022

Onise Bughadze (born 12 January 1991) is a Georgian judoka.

He is the bronze medallist of the 2017 Judo Grand Slam Baku in the +100 kg category.
