= 2017 Judo Grand Slam Paris =

Judo competition

Judo 2017 Judo Grand Slam Paris
- Venue: AccorHotels Arena, Paris
- Location: Paris, France
- Dates: 11–12 February 2017
- Competitors: 409 from 61 nations

Competition at external databases
- Links: IJF • EJU • JudoInside

The 2017 Judo Grand Slam Paris was held in Paris, France, from 11 to 12 February 2017.

== Medal summary ==
=== Men's events ===
Event	Gold	Silver	Bronze
Extra-lightweight (−60 kg)	Naohisa Takato (JPN)	Sharafuddin Lutfillaev (UZB)	Orkhan Safarov (AZE)
Extra-lightweight (−60 kg)	Naohisa Takato (JPN)	Sharafuddin Lutfillaev (UZB)	Amiran Papinashvili (GEO)
Half-lightweight (−66 kg)	Hifumi Abe (JPN)	Anzaur Ardanov (RUS)	Vazha Margvelashvili (GEO)
Half-lightweight (−66 kg)	Hifumi Abe (JPN)	Anzaur Ardanov (RUS)	Nijat Shikhalizada (AZE)
Lightweight (−73 kg)	Soichi Hashimoto (JPN)	An Chang-rim (KOR)	Hidayat Heydarov (AZE)
Lightweight (−73 kg)	Soichi Hashimoto (JPN)	An Chang-rim (KOR)	Tohar Butbul (ISR)
Half-middleweight (−81 kg)	Frank de Wit (NED)	Zebeda Rekhviashvili (GEO)	Baptiste Pierre (FRA)
Half-middleweight (−81 kg)	Frank de Wit (NED)	Zebeda Rekhviashvili (GEO)	Pape Doudou Ndiaye (FRA)
Middleweight (−90 kg)	Cheng Xunzhao (CHN)	Axel Clerget (FRA)	Mihael Žgank (SLO)
Middleweight (−90 kg)	Cheng Xunzhao (CHN)	Axel Clerget (FRA)	Gwak Dong-han (KOR)
Half-heavyweight (−100 kg)	Kentaro Iida (JPN)	Cyrille Maret (FRA)	Jorge Fonseca (POR)
Half-heavyweight (−100 kg)	Kentaro Iida (JPN)	Cyrille Maret (FRA)	Varlam Liparteliani (GEO)
Heavyweight (+100 kg)	Takeshi Ōjitani (JPN)	Ryu Shichinohe (JPN)	Ölziibayaryn Düürenbayar (MGL)
Heavyweight (+100 kg)	Takeshi Ōjitani (JPN)	Ryu Shichinohe (JPN)	Rafael Silva (BRA)

=== Women's events ===
Event	Gold	Silver	Bronze
Extra-lightweight (−48 kg)	Jeong Bo-kyeong (KOR)	Mönkhbatyn Urantsetseg (MGL)	Ami Kondo (JPN)
Extra-lightweight (−48 kg)	Jeong Bo-kyeong (KOR)	Mönkhbatyn Urantsetseg (MGL)	Milica Nikolić (SRB)
Half-lightweight (−52 kg)	Majlinda Kelmendi (KOS)	Natsumi Tsunoda (JPN)	Natalia Kuziutina (RUS)
Half-lightweight (−52 kg)	Majlinda Kelmendi (KOS)	Natsumi Tsunoda (JPN)	Distria Krasniqi (KOS)
Lightweight (−57 kg)	Kwon You-jeong (KOR)	Hélène Receveaux (FRA)	Priscilla Gneto (FRA)
Lightweight (−57 kg)	Kwon You-jeong (KOR)	Hélène Receveaux (FRA)	Tsukasa Yoshida (JPN)
Half-middleweight (−63 kg)	Tina Trstenjak (SLO)	Clarisse Agbegnenou (FRA)	Margaux Pinot (FRA)
Half-middleweight (−63 kg)	Tina Trstenjak (SLO)	Clarisse Agbegnenou (FRA)	Kiyomi Watanabe (PHI)
Middleweight (−70 kg)	Chizuru Arai (JPN)	Kelita Zupancic (CAN)	Sanne van Dijke (NED)
Middleweight (−70 kg)	Chizuru Arai (JPN)	Kelita Zupancic (CAN)	Elvismar Rodríguez (VEN)
Half-heavyweight (−78 kg)	Audrey Tcheuméo (FRA)	Ruika Sato (JPN)	Guusje Steenhuis (NED)
Half-heavyweight (−78 kg)	Audrey Tcheuméo (FRA)	Ruika Sato (JPN)	Sama Hawa Camara (FRA)
Heavyweight (+78 kg)	Sarah Asahina (JPN)	Kanae Yamabe (JPN)	Émilie Andéol (FRA)
Heavyweight (+78 kg)	Sarah Asahina (JPN)	Kanae Yamabe (JPN)	Kim Min-jeong (KOR)

Source Results

=== Medal table ===
* Host nation (France)

Rank	Nation	Gold	Silver	Bronze	Total
1	Japan (JPN)	7	4	2	13
2	South Korea (KOR)	2	1	2	5
3	France (FRA)*	1	4	6	11
4	Netherlands (NED)	1	0	2	3
5	Kosovo (KOS)	1	0	1	2
5	Slovenia (SLO)	1	0	1	2
7	China (CHN)	1	0	0	1
8	Georgia (GEO)	0	1	3	4
9	Mongolia (MGL)	0	1	1	2
9	Russia (RUS)	0	1	1	2
11	Canada (CAN)	0	1	0	1
11	Uzbekistan (UZB)	0	1	0	1
13	Azerbaijan (AZE)	0	0	3	3
14	Brazil (BRA)	0	0	1	1
14	Israel (ISR)	0	0	1	1
14	Philippines (PHI)	0	0	1	1
14	Portugal (POR)	0	0	1	1
14	Serbia (SRB)	0	0	1	1
14	Venezuela (VEN)	0	0	1	1
Totals (19 entries)		14	14	28	56
