= Kim Jin-a =

North Korean judoka (born 1996)

Personal information
- Born: 20 August 1996 (age 29)
- Occupation: Judoka

Sport
- Country: North Korea
- Sport: Judo
- Weight class: ‍–‍57 kg

Achievements and titles
- World Champ.: R32 (2017, 2018)
- Asian Champ.: (gold) (2019)
Medal record
Women's judo
Representing North Korea
Asian Games
Silver medal – second place	2018 Jakarta	‍–‍57 kg
Asian Championships
Gold medal – first place	2019 Fujairah	‍–‍57 kg
World Masters
Gold medal – first place	2019 Qingdao	‍–‍57 kg
IJF Grand Slam
Gold medal – first place	2019 Abu Dhabi	‍–‍57 kg
IJF Grand Prix
Gold medal – first place	2019 Hohhot	‍–‍57 kg
Asian Junior Championships
Silver medal – second place	2015 Bangkok	‍–‍63 kg
Asian Cadet Championships
Gold medal – first place	2013 Hainan	‍–‍52 kg
Asian Youth Games
Gold medal – first place	2013 Nanjing	‍–‍52 kg
Asian Cadet Championships
Gold medal – first place	2011 Beirut	‍–‍44 kg

Profile at external databases
- IJF: 27775
- JudoInside.com: 81119
- Updated on 21 November 2022

Kim Jin-a (born 20 August 1996) is a North Korean judoka.

Kim won the gold medal in the girls' 52 kg event at the 2013 Asian Youth Games held in Nanjing, China.

Kim participated at the 2018 World Judo Championships, winning a medal.

In 2019, Kim won the gold medal in the women's 57 kg event at the 2019 Judo World Masters held in Qingdao, China.
