= 2017 Judo World Masters =

Judo competition

Judo 2017 Judo World Masters
- Venue: Yubileyny Sports Palace, Saint Petersburg
- Location: Saint Petersburg, Russia
- Dates: 16–17 December 2017
- Competitors: 214 from 46 nations

Competition at external databases
- Links: IJF • JudoInside

The 2017 Judo World Masters was a judo tournament held in Saint Petersburg, Russia, from 16 to 17 December 2017.

== Medal summary ==
=== Medal table ===
* Host nation

Rank	Nation	Gold	Silver	Bronze	Total
1	Japan (JPN)	4	2	1	7
2	Georgia (GEO)	3	1	1	5
3	Russia (RUS)*	2	2	1	5
4	Mongolia (MGL)	2	0	2	4
5	Netherlands (NED)	1	1	4	6
6	Brazil (BRA)	1	1	3	5
7	South Korea (KOR)	1	1	2	4
8	France (FRA)	0	2	3	5
9	Cuba (CUB)	0	1	1	2
9	Spain (ESP)	0	1	1	2
11	Croatia (CRO)	0	1	0	1
11	Kazakhstan (KAZ)	0	1	0	1
13	Azerbaijan (AZE)	0	0	2	2
13	Sweden (SWE)	0	0	2	2
15	Bosnia and Herzegovina (BIH)	0	0	1	1
15	Hungary (HUN)	0	0	1	1
15	Israel (ISR)	0	0	1	1
15	Romania (ROU)	0	0	1	1
15	Uzbekistan (UZB)	0	0	1	1
Totals (19 entries)		14	14	28	56

=== Men's events ===
Event	Gold	Silver	Bronze
Extra-lightweight (-60 kg)	Ryuju Nagayama; Japan	Francisco Garrigós; Spain	Amartuvshin Dashdavaa; Mongolia
Extra-lightweight (-60 kg)	Ryuju Nagayama; Japan	Francisco Garrigós; Spain	Sharafuddin Lutfillaev; Uzbekistan
Half-lightweight (-66 kg)	Ganboldyn Kherlen; Mongolia	Yeldos Zhumakanov; Kazakhstan	Vazha Margvelashvili; Georgia
Half-lightweight (-66 kg)	Ganboldyn Kherlen; Mongolia	Yeldos Zhumakanov; Kazakhstan	Baruch Shmailov; Israel
Lightweight (-73 kg)	Soichi Hashimoto; Japan	Lasha Shavdatuashvili; Georgia	Hidayat Heydarov; Azerbaijan
Lightweight (-73 kg)	Soichi Hashimoto; Japan	Lasha Shavdatuashvili; Georgia	Tommy Macias; Sweden
Half-middleweight (-81 kg)	Khasan Khalmurzaev; Russia	Aslan Lappinagov; Russia	Frank de Wit; Netherlands
Half-middleweight (-81 kg)	Khasan Khalmurzaev; Russia	Aslan Lappinagov; Russia	Alan Khubetsov; Russia
Middleweight (-90 kg)	Beka Gviniashvili; Georgia	Gwak Dong-han; South Korea	Nikoloz Sherazadishvili; Spain
Middleweight (-90 kg)	Beka Gviniashvili; Georgia	Gwak Dong-han; South Korea	Kenta Nagasawa; Japan
Half-heavyweight (-100 kg)	Varlam Liparteliani; Georgia	Michael Korrel; Netherlands	Miklós Cirjenics; Hungary
Half-heavyweight (-100 kg)	Varlam Liparteliani; Georgia	Michael Korrel; Netherlands	Elkhan Mammadov; Azerbaijan
Heavyweight (+100 kg)	Guram Tushishvili; Georgia	David Moura; Brazil	Alex García Mendoza; Cuba
Heavyweight (+100 kg)	Guram Tushishvili; Georgia	David Moura; Brazil	Rafael Silva; Brazil

=== Women's events ===
Event	Gold	Silver	Bronze
Extra-lightweight (-48 kg)	Funa Tonaki; Japan	Irina Dolgova; Russia	Urantsetseg Munkhbat; Mongolia
Extra-lightweight (-48 kg)	Funa Tonaki; Japan	Irina Dolgova; Russia	Jeong Bo-kyeong; South Korea
Half-lightweight (-52 kg)	Natalia Kuziutina; Russia	Amandine Buchard; France	Alexandra-Larisa Florian; Romania
Half-lightweight (-52 kg)	Natalia Kuziutina; Russia	Amandine Buchard; France	Érika Miranda; Brazil
Lightweight (-57 kg)	Sumiya Dorjsuren; Mongolia	Tsukasa Yoshida; Japan	Kwon You-jeong; South Korea
Lightweight (-57 kg)	Sumiya Dorjsuren; Mongolia	Tsukasa Yoshida; Japan	Hélène Receveaux; France
Half-middleweight (-63 kg)	Miku Tashiro; Japan	Nami Nabekura; Japan	Clarisse Agbegnenou; France
Half-middleweight (-63 kg)	Miku Tashiro; Japan	Nami Nabekura; Japan	Juul Franssen; Netherlands
Middleweight (-70 kg)	Maria Portela; Brazil	Barbara Matić; Croatia	Anna Bernholm; Sweden
Middleweight (-70 kg)	Maria Portela; Brazil	Barbara Matić; Croatia	Marie-Ève Gahié; France
Half-heavyweight (-78 kg)	Marhinde Verkerk; Netherlands	Madeleine Malonga; France	Guusje Steenhuis; Netherlands
Half-heavyweight (-78 kg)	Marhinde Verkerk; Netherlands	Madeleine Malonga; France	Karen Stevenson; Netherlands
Heavyweight (+78 kg)	Kim Min-jeong; South Korea	Idalys Ortiz; Cuba	Maria Suelen Altheman; Brazil
Heavyweight (+78 kg)	Kim Min-jeong; South Korea	Idalys Ortiz; Cuba	Larisa Cerić; Bosnia and Herzegovina
