= Ri Hyo-sun =

North Korean judoka (born 1991)

Personal information
- Born: 5 August 1991 (age 34)
- Occupation: Judoka

Sport
- Country: North Korea
- Sport: Judo
- Weight class: ‍–‍57 kg

Achievements and titles
- World Champ.: R32 (2015, 2018)
- Asian Champ.: (bronze) (2014)
Medal record
Women's judo
Representing Korea
World Championships
Bronze medal – third place	2018 Baku	Mixed team
Representing North Korea
Asian Games
Bronze medal – third place	2014 Incheon	‍–‍57 kg
Bronze medal – third place	2014 Incheon	Women's team
IJF Grand Prix
Bronze medal – third place	2015 Ulaanbaatar	‍–‍57 kg

Profile at external databases
- IJF: 16249
- JudoInside.com: 33199
- Updated on 16 December 2022

Ri Hyo-sun (born 5 August 1991) is a North Korean judoka.

Ri participated at the 2018 World Judo Championships, winning a medal in the mixed team event.
