= 2016 Judo Grand Prix Tashkent =

Judo competition

Judo 2016 Judo Grand Prix Tashkent
- Venue: Sport Hall
- Location: Tashkent, Uzbekistan
- Dates: 6–8 October 2016
- Competitors: 135 from 15 nations

Competition at external databases
- Links: IJF • EJU • JudoInside

The 2016 Judo Grand Prix Tashkent was held at the Sport Hall in Tashkent, Uzbekistan from 6 to 8 October 2016.

== Medal summary ==
=== Men's events ===
Event	Gold	Silver	Bronze
Extra-lightweight (−60 kg)	Mukhriddin Tilovov (UZB)	Matjaž Trbovc (SLO)	Bauyrzhan Zhauyntayev (KAZ)
Extra-lightweight (−60 kg)	Mukhriddin Tilovov (UZB)	Matjaž Trbovc (SLO)	Sharafuddin Lutfillaev (UZB)
Half-lightweight (−66 kg)	Kengo Takaichi (JPN)	Azamat Mukanov (KAZ)	Dovdony Altansükh (MGL)
Half-lightweight (−66 kg)	Kengo Takaichi (JPN)	Azamat Mukanov (KAZ)	Andraž Jereb (SLO)
Lightweight (−73 kg)	Mirzohid Farmonov (UZB)	Giyosjon Boboev (UZB)	Uali Kurzhev (RUS)
Lightweight (−73 kg)	Mirzohid Farmonov (UZB)	Giyosjon Boboev (UZB)	Muso Sobirov (UZB)
Half-middleweight (−81 kg)	Davlat Bobonov (UZB)	Hayato Watanabe (JPN)	Rufat Ismayilov (AZE)
Half-middleweight (−81 kg)	Davlat Bobonov (UZB)	Hayato Watanabe (JPN)	Srđan Mrvaljević (MNE)
Middleweight (−90 kg)	Yakhyo Imamov (UZB)	Davronbek Sattorov (UZB)	Mukhammadkarim Khurramov (UZB)
Middleweight (−90 kg)	Yakhyo Imamov (UZB)	Davronbek Sattorov (UZB)	Magomed Magomedov (RUS)
Half-heavyweight (−100 kg)	Soyib Kurbonov (UZB)	Jalil Shukurov (AZE)	Viktor Demyanenko (KAZ)
Half-heavyweight (−100 kg)	Soyib Kurbonov (UZB)	Jalil Shukurov (AZE)	Erkin Doniyorov (UZB)
Heavyweight (+100 kg)	Yerzhan Shynkeyev (KAZ)	Andrey Volkov (RUS)	Boltoboy Baltaev (UZB)
Heavyweight (+100 kg)	Yerzhan Shynkeyev (KAZ)	Andrey Volkov (RUS)	Aliaksandr Vakhaviak (BLR)

=== Women's events ===
Event	Gold	Silver	Bronze
Extra-lightweight (−48 kg)	Mariia Persidskaia (RUS)	Liliia Kiseleva (RUS)	Mukaddas Kubeeva (UZB)
Extra-lightweight (−48 kg)	Mariia Persidskaia (RUS)	Liliia Kiseleva (RUS)	Nodira Gulova (UZB)
Half-lightweight (−52 kg)	Aigunim Tuitekova (KAZ)	Diyora Keldiyorova (UZB)	Tena Šikić (CRO)
Half-lightweight (−52 kg)	Aigunim Tuitekova (KAZ)	Diyora Keldiyorova (UZB)	Gulaim Jumabaeva (UZB)
Lightweight (−57 kg)	Anastasia Konkina (RUS)	Manon Durbach (LUX)	Sevara Nishanbayeva (KAZ)
Lightweight (−57 kg)	Anastasia Konkina (RUS)	Manon Durbach (LUX)	Sanobar Sultanova (UZB)
Half-middleweight (−63 kg)	Daria Davydova (RUS)	Marijana Mišković Hasanbegović (CRO)	Daniela Kazanoi (BLR)
Half-middleweight (−63 kg)	Daria Davydova (RUS)	Marijana Mišković Hasanbegović (CRO)	Andreja Leški (SLO)
Middleweight (−70 kg)	Gulnoza Matniyazova (UZB)	Anka Pogačnik (SLO)	Aelita Chsherbakova (KAZ)
Middleweight (−70 kg)	Gulnoza Matniyazova (UZB)	Anka Pogačnik (SLO)	Iana Dibrina (RUS)
Half-heavyweight (−78 kg)	Abigél Joó (HUN)	Albina Amangeldiyeva (KAZ)	Zarina Raifova (KAZ)
Half-heavyweight (−78 kg)	Abigél Joó (HUN)	Albina Amangeldiyeva (KAZ)	Kumush Yuldashova (UZB)
Heavyweight (+78 kg)	Gulzhan Issanova (KAZ)	Maryna Slutskaya (BLR)	Daria Karpova (RUS)
Heavyweight (+78 kg)	Gulzhan Issanova (KAZ)	Maryna Slutskaya (BLR)	Rahima Yuldoshova (UZB)

Source Results

=== Medal table ===
* Host nation (Uzbekistan)

Rank	Nation	Gold	Silver	Bronze	Total
1	Uzbekistan (UZB)*	6	3	11	20
2	Kazakhstan (KAZ)	3	2	5	10
3	Russia (RUS)	3	2	4	9
4	Japan (JPN)	1	1	0	2
5	Hungary (HUN)	1	0	0	1
6	Slovenia (SLO)	0	2	2	4
7	Belarus (BLR)	0	1	2	3
8	Azerbaijan (AZE)	0	1	1	2
8	Croatia (CRO)	0	1	1	2
10	Luxembourg (LUX)	0	1	0	1
11	Mongolia (MGL)	0	0	1	1
11	Montenegro (MNE)	0	0	1	1
Totals (12 entries)		14	14	28	56
