= 2017 World Judo Championships =

Judo competition

Judo 2017 World Judo Championships
- Venue: László Papp Budapest Sports Arena
- Location: Budapest, Hungary
- Dates: 28 August – 3 September 2017
- Competitors: 728 from 126 nations
- Total prize money: 998,000$
- Website: Official website

Champions
- Mixed team: Japan (1st title)

Competition at external databases
- Links: IJF • EJU • JudoInside

The 2017 World Judo Championships were held in Budapest, Hungary, between 28 August and 3 September 2017 at the László Papp Budapest Sports Arena. The announcement of the host city took place on 23 March 2015.

== Medal summary ==
=== Medal table ===
Rank	Nation	Gold	Silver	Bronze	Total
1	Japan (JPN)	8	4	1	13
2	France (FRA)	2	0	2	4
3	Brazil (BRA)	1	2	2	5
4	Mongolia (MGL)	1	1	4	6
5	China (CHN)	1	0	0	1
5	Germany (GER)	1	0	0	1
5	Serbia (SRB)	1	0	0	1
8	Azerbaijan (AZE)	0	2	2	4
9	Slovenia (SVN)	0	2	0	2
10	Russia (RUS)	0	1	3	4
11	Georgia (GEO)	0	1	2	3
12	Italy (ITA)	0	1	0	1
12	Puerto Rico (PUR)	0	1	0	1
14	South Korea (KOR)	0	0	4	4
15	Great Britain (GBR)	0	0	2	2
16	Colombia (COL)	0	0	1	1
16	Cuba (CUB)	0	0	1	1
16	Iran (IRI)	0	0	1	1
16	Israel (ISR)	0	0	1	1
16	Kazakhstan (KAZ)	0	0	1	1
16	Poland (POL)	0	0	1	1
16	Spain (ESP)	0	0	1	1
16	Uzbekistan (UZB)	0	0	1	1
Totals (23 entries)		15	15	30	60

=== Men's events ===
Event	Gold	Silver	Bronze
Extra-lightweight (60 kg)	Naohisa Takato; Japan	Orkhan Safarov; Azerbaijan	Boldbaatar Ganbat; Mongolia
Extra-lightweight (60 kg)	Naohisa Takato; Japan	Orkhan Safarov; Azerbaijan	Diyorbek Urozboev; Uzbekistan
Half-lightweight (66 kg)	Hifumi Abe; Japan	Mikhail Pulyaev; Russia	Vazha Margvelashvili; Georgia
Half-lightweight (66 kg)	Hifumi Abe; Japan	Mikhail Pulyaev; Russia	Tal Flicker; Israel
Lightweight (73 kg)	Soichi Hashimoto; Japan	Rustam Orujov; Azerbaijan	An Chang-rim; South Korea
Lightweight (73 kg)	Soichi Hashimoto; Japan	Rustam Orujov; Azerbaijan	Odbayar Ganbaatar; Mongolia
Half-middleweight (81 kg)	Alexander Wieczerzak; Germany	Matteo Marconcini; Italy	Saeid Mollaei; Iran
Half-middleweight (81 kg)	Alexander Wieczerzak; Germany	Matteo Marconcini; Italy	Khasan Khalmurzaev; Russia
Middleweight (90 kg)	Nemanja Majdov; Serbia	Mihael Žgank; Slovenia	Gwak Dong-han; South Korea
Middleweight (90 kg)	Nemanja Majdov; Serbia	Mihael Žgank; Slovenia	Ushangi Margiani; Georgia
Half-heavyweight (100 kg)	Aaron Wolf; Japan	Varlam Liparteliani; Georgia	Elmar Gasimov; Azerbaijan
Half-heavyweight (100 kg)	Aaron Wolf; Japan	Varlam Liparteliani; Georgia	Kirill Denisov; Russia
Heavyweight (+100 kg)	Teddy Riner; France	David Moura; Brazil	Naidangiin Tüvshinbayar; Mongolia
Heavyweight (+100 kg)	Teddy Riner; France	David Moura; Brazil	Rafael Silva; Brazil

=== Women's events ===
Event	Gold	Silver	Bronze
Extra-lightweight (48 kg)	Funa Tonaki; Japan	Mönkhbatyn Urantsetseg; Mongolia	Ami Kondo; Japan
Extra-lightweight (48 kg)	Funa Tonaki; Japan	Mönkhbatyn Urantsetseg; Mongolia	Galbadrakhyn Otgontsetseg; Kazakhstan
Half-lightweight (52 kg)	Ai Shishime; Japan	Natsumi Tsunoda; Japan	Natalia Kuziutina; Russia
Half-lightweight (52 kg)	Ai Shishime; Japan	Natsumi Tsunoda; Japan	Érika Miranda; Brazil
Lightweight (57 kg)	Sumiya Dorjsuren; Mongolia	Tsukasa Yoshida; Japan	Hélène Receveaux; France
Lightweight (57 kg)	Sumiya Dorjsuren; Mongolia	Tsukasa Yoshida; Japan	Nekoda Smythe-Davis; Great Britain
Half-middleweight (63 kg)	Clarisse Agbegnenou; France	Tina Trstenjak; Slovenia	Agata Ozdoba-Błach; Poland
Half-middleweight (63 kg)	Clarisse Agbegnenou; France	Tina Trstenjak; Slovenia	Baldorjyn Möngönchimeg; Mongolia
Middleweight (70 kg)	Chizuru Arai; Japan	María Pérez; Puerto Rico	Yuri Alvear; Colombia
Middleweight (70 kg)	Chizuru Arai; Japan	María Pérez; Puerto Rico	María Bernabéu; Spain
Half-heavyweight (78 kg)	Mayra Aguiar; Brazil	Mami Umeki; Japan	Kaliema Antomarchi; Cuba
Half-heavyweight (78 kg)	Mayra Aguiar; Brazil	Mami Umeki; Japan	Natalie Powell; Great Britain
Heavyweight (+78 kg)	Yu Song; China	Sarah Asahina; Japan	Kim Min-jeong; South Korea
Heavyweight (+78 kg)	Yu Song; China	Sarah Asahina; Japan	Iryna Kindzerska; Azerbaijan

=== Mixed events ===
Event	Gold	Silver	Bronze
Team	Japan; Chizuru Arai; Sarah Asahina; Hisayoshi Harasawa; Soichi Hashimoto; Kenta Nagasawa; Takanori Nagase; Riki Nakaya; Saki Niizoe; Takeshi Ojitani; Akira Sone; Nae Udaka; Tsukasa Yoshida	Brazil; Maria Suelen Altheman; Eduardo Barbosa; Eduardo Bettoni; Marcelo Contini; Érika Miranda; David Moura; Victor Penalber; Maria Portela; Ketleyn Quadros; Rafael Silva; Rafaela Silva; Beatriz Souza	France; Clarisse Agbegnenou; Émilie Andéol; Benjamin Axus; Axel Clerget; Romane Dicko; Pierre Duprat; Marie-Eve Gahié; Priscilla Gneto; Cyrille Maret; Loïc Pietri; Hélène Receveaux; Teddy Riner
Team	Japan; Chizuru Arai; Sarah Asahina; Hisayoshi Harasawa; Soichi Hashimoto; Kenta Nagasawa; Takanori Nagase; Riki Nakaya; Saki Niizoe; Takeshi Ojitani; Akira Sone; Nae Udaka; Tsukasa Yoshida	Brazil; Maria Suelen Altheman; Eduardo Barbosa; Eduardo Bettoni; Marcelo Contini; Érika Miranda; David Moura; Victor Penalber; Maria Portela; Ketleyn Quadros; Rafael Silva; Rafaela Silva; Beatriz Souza	South Korea; An Baul; An Chang-rim; Gwak Dong-han; Jeong Hye-jin; Ji Yun-seo; Kim Min-jeong; Kim Sung-min; Kim Seong-yeon; Kwon You-jeong; Lee Jae-yong; Park Yu-jin; Won Jong-hoon

== Notable attendees ==
Besides Prime Minister of Hungary Viktor Orbán, the tournament was visited by President of Russia Vladimir Putin, holder of the eight dan (black belt), and President of Mongolia Khaltmaagiin Battulga, World Sambo champion and President of the Mongolian Judo Association.

== Prize money ==
The sums written are per medalist, bringing the total prizes awarded to $798,000 for the individual events and $200,000 for the team event. (retrieved from:)

Medal	Individual			Mixed team		
Medal	Total	Judoka	Coach	Total	Judoka	Coach
Gold	$26,000	$20,800	$5,200	$90,000	$72,000	$18,000
Silver	$15,000	$12,000	$3,000	$60,000	$48,000	$12,000
Bronze	$8,000	$6,400	$1,600	$25,000	$20,000	$5,000
