= 2017 Judo Grand Slam Baku =

Judo competition

Judo 2017 Judo Grand Slam Baku
- Venue: Heydar Aliyev Sports and Exhibition Complex
- Location: Baku, Azerbaijan
- Dates: 10–12 March 2017
- Competitors: 182 from 31 nations

Competition at external databases
- Links: IJF • EJU • JudoInside

The 2017 Judo Grand Slam was held in Baku, Azerbaijan, from 10 to 12 March 2017.

== Medal summary ==
=== Men's events ===
Event	Gold	Silver	Bronze
Extra-lightweight (−60 kg)	Toru Shishime (JPN)	Mukhriddin Tilovov (UZB)	Orkhan Safarov (AZE)
Extra-lightweight (−60 kg)	Toru Shishime (JPN)	Mukhriddin Tilovov (UZB)	Yanislav Gerchev (BUL)
Half-lightweight (−66 kg)	Tal Flicker (ISR)	Tomofumi Takajo (JPN)	Lasha Giunashvili (GEO)
Half-lightweight (−66 kg)	Tal Flicker (ISR)	Tomofumi Takajo (JPN)	Baruch Shmailov (ISR)
Lightweight (−73 kg)	Ganbaataryn Odbayar (MGL)	Riki Nakaya (JPN)	Rustam Orujov (AZE)
Lightweight (−73 kg)	Ganbaataryn Odbayar (MGL)	Riki Nakaya (JPN)	Miklós Ungvári (HUN)
Half-middleweight (−81 kg)	Rufat Ismayilov (AZE)	Saeid Mollaei (IRI)	Kenya Kohara (JPN)
Half-middleweight (−81 kg)	Rufat Ismayilov (AZE)	Saeid Mollaei (IRI)	Otgonbaataryn Uuganbaatar (MGL)
Middleweight (−90 kg)	Islam Bozbayev (KAZ)	Mammadali Mehdiyev (AZE)	Quedjau Nhabali (UKR)
Middleweight (−90 kg)	Islam Bozbayev (KAZ)	Mammadali Mehdiyev (AZE)	Ushangi Margiani (GEO)
Half-heavyweight (−100 kg)	Michael Korrel (NED)	Elmar Gasimov (AZE)	Elkhan Mammadov (AZE)
Half-heavyweight (−100 kg)	Michael Korrel (NED)	Elmar Gasimov (AZE)	Miklós Cirjenics (HUN)
Heavyweight (+100 kg)	Guram Tushishvili (GEO)	Barna Bor (HUN)	Stanislav Bondarenko (UKR)
Heavyweight (+100 kg)	Guram Tushishvili (GEO)	Barna Bor (HUN)	Onise Bughadze (GEO)

=== Women's events ===
Event	Gold	Silver	Bronze
Extra-lightweight (−48 kg)	Stefannie Arissa Koyama (BRA)	Milica Nikolić (SRB)	Shira Rishony (ISR)
Extra-lightweight (−48 kg)	Stefannie Arissa Koyama (BRA)	Milica Nikolić (SRB)	Noa Minsker (ISR)
Half-lightweight (−52 kg)	Alexandra-Larisa Florian (ROU)	Réka Pupp (HUN)	Anja Štangar (SLO)
Half-lightweight (−52 kg)	Alexandra-Larisa Florian (ROU)	Réka Pupp (HUN)	Charline Van Snick (BEL)
Lightweight (−57 kg)	Lien Chen-ling (TPE)	Jovana Rogić (SRB)	Timna Nelson-Levy (ISR)
Lightweight (−57 kg)	Lien Chen-ling (TPE)	Jovana Rogić (SRB)	Julia Kowalczyk (POL)
Half-middleweight (−63 kg)	Alice Schlesinger (GBR)	Andreja Leški (SLO)	Büşra Katipoğlu (TUR)
Half-middleweight (−63 kg)	Alice Schlesinger (GBR)	Andreja Leški (SLO)	Khanim Huseynova (AZE)
Middleweight (−70 kg)	Yuri Alvear (COL)	Elvismar Rodríguez (VEN)	Aleksandra Samardžić (BIH)
Middleweight (−70 kg)	Yuri Alvear (COL)	Elvismar Rodríguez (VEN)	Barbara Matić (CRO)
Half-heavyweight (−78 kg)	Guusje Steenhuis (NED)	Marhinde Verkerk (NED)	Shiori Yoshimura (JPN)
Half-heavyweight (−78 kg)	Guusje Steenhuis (NED)	Marhinde Verkerk (NED)	Abigél Joó (HUN)
Heavyweight (+78 kg)	Tessie Savelkouls (NED)	Kayra Sayit (TUR)	Svitlana Iaromka (UKR)
Heavyweight (+78 kg)	Tessie Savelkouls (NED)	Kayra Sayit (TUR)	Yelyzaveta Kalanina (UKR)

Source Results

=== Medal table ===
* Host nation (Azerbaijan)

Rank	Nation	Gold	Silver	Bronze	Total
1	Netherlands (NED)	3	1	0	4
2	Azerbaijan (AZE)*	1	2	4	7
3	Japan (JPN)	1	2	2	5
4	Israel (ISR)	1	0	4	5
5	Georgia (GEO)	1	0	3	4
6	Mongolia (MGL)	1	0	1	2
7	Brazil (BRA)	1	0	0	1
7	Chinese Taipei (TPE)	1	0	0	1
7	Colombia (COL)	1	0	0	1
7	Great Britain (GBR)	1	0	0	1
7	Kazakhstan (KAZ)	1	0	0	1
7	Romania (ROU)	1	0	0	1
13	Hungary (HUN)	0	2	3	5
14	Serbia (SRB)	0	2	0	2
15	Slovenia (SLO)	0	1	1	2
15	Turkey (TUR)	0	1	1	2
17	Iran (IRI)	0	1	0	1
17	Uzbekistan (UZB)	0	1	0	1
17	Venezuela (VEN)	0	1	0	1
20	Ukraine (UKR)	0	0	4	4
21	Belgium (BEL)	0	0	1	1
21	Bosnia and Herzegovina (BIH)	0	0	1	1
21	Bulgaria (BUL)	0	0	1	1
21	Croatia (CRO)	0	0	1	1
21	Poland (POL)	0	0	1	1
Totals (25 entries)		14	14	28	56
