= Maysa Pardayeva =

Turkmen judoka (born 2005)

Personal information
- Born: 14 February 2005 (age 21) Köýtendag, Turkmenistan
- Occupation: Judoka

Sport
- Country: Turkmenistan
- Sport: Judo
- Weight class: ‍–‍57 kg

Achievements and titles
- Olympic Games: R16 (2024)
- World Champ.: 5th (2025)
- Asian Champ.: (bronze) (2023)
Medal record
Women's judo
Representing Turkmenistan
Asian Games
Bronze medal – third place	2023 Hangzhou	‍–‍57 kg
IJF Grand Slam
Bronze medal – third place	2024 Antalya	‍–‍57 kg
Bronze medal – third place	2026 Ulaanbaatar	‍–‍57 kg
IJF Grand Prix
Gold medal – first place	2026 Qingdao	‍–‍57 kg

Profile at external databases
- IJF: 61678
- JudoInside.com: 155087
- Updated on 26 June 2026

Maysa Pardayeva (Turkmen: Maýsa Pardaýewa; born 14 February 2005) is a judoka from Turkmenistan. She won a bronze medal at the 2022 Asian Games.

== Early life ==
She is from the Lebap Region of Turkmenistan.

== Career ==
In 2022, she won the Junior Asian Cup in Almaty, Kazakhstan.

She won the Junior European Cup in Sarajevo in March 2023 in the -57kg category. She won bronze at the Kuwait Open Tournament in the 57kg in April 2023. She won a bronze medal in the women's -57kg at the delayed 2022 Asian Games in Hangzhou, China in September 2023. At the Games opening ceremony she also had the honour of being the country's flag bearer.

In February 2024, she won the Warsaw European Open in the weight category up to 57 kg. She won a bronze medal at the Grand Slam in Antalya in April 2024. In July 2024, she was selected for the 2024 Paris Olympics. She was selected to carry the Turkmen flag during the Paris 2024 opening ceremony with Serdar Rahimov.

She won a bronze medal at the Grand Slam in Ulaanbaatar in June 2026.
