= 2016 Judo Grand Prix Düsseldorf =

Judo competition

Judo 2016 Judo Grand Prix Düsseldorf
- Venue: Mitsubishi Electric Halle
- Location: Düsseldorf, Germany
- Dates: 19–21 February 2016
- Competitors: 541 from 86 nations

Competition at external databases
- Links: IJF • JudoInside

The 2016 Judo Grand Prix Düsseldorf was held at the Mitsubishi Electric Halle in Düsseldorf, Germany from 19 to 21 February 2016.

== Medal summary ==
=== Men's events ===
Event	Gold	Silver	Bronze
Extra-lightweight (−60 kg)	Kim Won-jin (KOR)	Yeldos Smetov (KAZ)	Bekir Özlü (TUR)
Extra-lightweight (−60 kg)	Kim Won-jin (KOR)	Yeldos Smetov (KAZ)	Beslan Mudranov (RUS)
Half-lightweight (−66 kg)	An Ba-ul (KOR)	Golan Pollack (ISR)	Vazha Margvelashvili (GEO)
Half-lightweight (−66 kg)	An Ba-ul (KOR)	Golan Pollack (ISR)	Mikhail Pulyaev (RUS)
Lightweight (−73 kg)	Shohei Ono (JPN)	Rustam Orujov (AZE)	An Chang-rim (KOR)
Lightweight (−73 kg)	Shohei Ono (JPN)	Rustam Orujov (AZE)	Lasha Shavdatuashvili (GEO)
Half-middleweight (−81 kg)	Joachim Bottieau (BEL)	Sven Maresch (GER)	Ivaylo Ivanov (BUL)
Half-middleweight (−81 kg)	Joachim Bottieau (BEL)	Sven Maresch (GER)	Dominic Ressel (GER)
Middleweight (−90 kg)	Marcus Nyman (SWE)	Krisztián Tóth (HUN)	Lkhagvasürengiin Otgonbaatar (MGL)
Middleweight (−90 kg)	Marcus Nyman (SWE)	Krisztián Tóth (HUN)	Kim Jae-yun (KOR)
Half-heavyweight (−100 kg)	Dimitri Peters (GER)	José Armenteros (CUB)	Javad Mahjoub (IRI)
Half-heavyweight (−100 kg)	Dimitri Peters (GER)	José Armenteros (CUB)	Adlan Bisultanov (RUS)
Heavyweight (+100 kg)	Iakiv Khammo (UKR)	Islam El Shehaby (EGY)	Barna Bor (HUN)
Heavyweight (+100 kg)	Iakiv Khammo (UKR)	Islam El Shehaby (EGY)	Kim Sung-min (KOR)

=== Women's events ===
Event	Gold	Silver	Bronze
Extra-lightweight (−48 kg)	Jeong Bo-kyeong (KOR)	Otgontsetseg Galbadrakh (KAZ)	Mönkhbatyn Urantsetseg (MGL)
Extra-lightweight (−48 kg)	Jeong Bo-kyeong (KOR)	Otgontsetseg Galbadrakh (KAZ)	Dayaris Mestre Álvarez (CUB)
Half-lightweight (−52 kg)	Ai Shishime (JPN)	Priscilla Gneto (FRA)	Andreea Chițu (ROU)
Half-lightweight (−52 kg)	Ai Shishime (JPN)	Priscilla Gneto (FRA)	Gülbadam Babamuratowa (TKM)
Lightweight (−57 kg)	Kaori Matsumoto (JPN)	Hélène Receveaux (FRA)	Lien Chen-ling (TPE)
Lightweight (−57 kg)	Kaori Matsumoto (JPN)	Hélène Receveaux (FRA)	Nekoda Smythe-Davis (GBR)
Half-middleweight (−63 kg)	Tina Trstenjak (SLO)	Alice Schlesinger (GBR)	Tsedevsürengiin Mönkhzayaa (MGL)
Half-middleweight (−63 kg)	Tina Trstenjak (SLO)	Alice Schlesinger (GBR)	Ekaterina Valkova (RUS)
Middleweight (−70 kg)	Bernadette Graf (AUT)	Chizuru Arai (JPN)	Laura Vargas Koch (GER)
Middleweight (−70 kg)	Bernadette Graf (AUT)	Chizuru Arai (JPN)	Yuri Alvear (COL)
Half-heavyweight (−78 kg)	Audrey Tcheuméo (FRA)	Luise Malzahn (GER)	Anamari Velenšek (SLO)
Half-heavyweight (−78 kg)	Audrey Tcheuméo (FRA)	Luise Malzahn (GER)	Guusje Steenhuis (NED)
Heavyweight (+78 kg)	Maria Suelen Altheman (BRA)	Yu Song (CHN)	Kim Min-jeong (KOR)
Heavyweight (+78 kg)	Maria Suelen Altheman (BRA)	Yu Song (CHN)	Kim Ji-youn (KOR)

Source Results

=== Medal table ===
* Host nation (Germany)

Rank	Nation	Gold	Silver	Bronze	Total
1	Japan (JPN)	3	1	0	4
2	South Korea (KOR)	3	0	5	8
3	Germany (GER)*	1	2	2	5
4	France (FRA)	1	2	0	3
5	Slovenia (SLO)	1	0	1	2
6	Austria (AUT)	1	0	0	1
6	Belgium (BEL)	1	0	0	1
6	Brazil (BRA)	1	0	0	1
6	Sweden (SWE)	1	0	0	1
6	Ukraine (UKR)	1	0	0	1
11	Kazakhstan (KAZ)	0	2	0	2
12	Cuba (CUB)	0	1	1	2
12	Great Britain (GBR)	0	1	1	2
12	Hungary (HUN)	0	1	1	2
15	Azerbaijan (AZE)	0	1	0	1
15	China (CHN)	0	1	0	1
15	Egypt (EGY)	0	1	0	1
15	Israel (ISR)	0	1	0	1
19	Russia (RUS)	0	0	4	4
20	Mongolia (MGL)	0	0	3	3
21	Georgia (GEO)	0	0	2	2
22	Bulgaria (BUL)	0	0	1	1
22	Chinese Taipei (TPE)	0	0	1	1
22	Colombia (COL)	0	0	1	1
22	Iran (IRI)	0	0	1	1
22	Netherlands (NED)	0	0	1	1
22	Romania (ROU)	0	0	1	1
22	Turkey (TUR)	0	0	1	1
22	Turkmenistan (TKM)	0	0	1	1
Totals (29 entries)		14	14	28	56
