= Lu Tongjuan =

Chinese judoka (born 1990)

Personal information
- Born: 10 March 1990 (age 36) Zhaoqing, China
- Occupation: Judoka

Sport
- Country: China
- Sport: Judo
- Weight class: ‍–‍57 kg

Achievements and titles
- Olympic Games: R16 (2020)
- World Champ.: R32 (2017)
- Asian Champ.: (gold) (2021)
Medal record
Women's judo
Representing China
Asian Championships
Gold medal – first place	2021 Bishkek	‍–‍57 kg
Bronze medal – third place	2011 Abu Dhabi	‍–‍57 kg
Bronze medal – third place	2017 Hong Kong	‍–‍57 kg
IJF Grand Slam
Bronze medal – third place	2016 Baku	‍–‍57 kg
Bronze medal – third place	2021 Antalya	‍–‍57 kg
IJF Grand Prix
Silver medal – second place	2018 The Hague	‍–‍57 kg
Bronze medal – third place	2011 Qingdao	‍–‍57 kg
Bronze medal – third place	2019 Hohhot	‍–‍57 kg

Profile at external databases
- IJF: 5183
- JudoInside.com: 62463
- Updated on 21 November 2022

Lu Tongjuan (born 10 March 1990) is a Chinese judoka. She competed at the World Judo Championships in 2017, 2018 and 2019.

In 2021, Lu won one of the bronze medals in her event at the 2021 Judo Grand Slam Antalya held in Antalya, Turkey. A few days later, she won the gold medal in her event at the 2021 Asian-Pacific Judo Championships held in Bishkek, Kyrgyzstan.

Lu competed in the women's 57 kg event at the 2020 Summer Olympics held in Tokyo, Japan.
