= Kwon You-jeong =

South Korean judoka (born 1995)

Personal information
- Born: 17 June 1995 (age 31)
- Occupation: Judoka
- Height: 1.65 m (5 ft 5 in)

Sport
- Country: South Korea
- Sport: Judo
- Weight class: ‍–‍57 kg

Achievements and titles
- World Champ.: 5th (2018)
- Asian Champ.: (silver) (2017)
Medal record
Women's judo
Representing South Korea
World Championships
Bronze medal – third place	2018 Baku	Mixed team
Asian Championships
Silver medal – second place	2017 Hong Kong	‍–‍57 kg
World Masters
Bronze medal – third place	2017 Saint Petersburg	‍–‍57 kg
IJF Grand Slam
Gold medal – first place	2017 Paris	‍–‍57 kg
Bronze medal – third place	2018 Osaka	‍–‍57 kg
IJF Grand Prix
Silver medal – second place	2018 Tunis	‍–‍57 kg
Bronze medal – third place	2018 Hohhot	‍–‍57 kg
Bronze medal – third place	2019 Tashkent	‍–‍57 kg
Asian Junior Championships
Silver medal – second place	2012 Taipei	‍–‍52 kg
Summer Universiade
Silver medal – second place	2017 Taipei	‍–‍57 kg

Profile at external databases
- IJF: 14762
- JudoInside.com: 90428
- Updated on 20 November 2022

Kwon You-jeong (born 17 June 1995) is a South Korean judoka.

Kwon participated at the 2018 World Judo Championships, winning a medal.
