= Anailis Dorvigni =

Cuban judoka (born 1991)

Personal information
- Born: 24 October 1991 (age 34)
- Occupation: Judoka

Sport
- Country: Cuba
- Sport: Judo
- Weight class: ‍–‍57 kg

Achievements and titles
- World Champ.: R16 (2013, 2017)
- Pan American Champ.: (2016, 2019)
Medal record
Women's judo
Representing Cuba
Pan American Championships
Bronze medal – third place	2016 Havana	‍–‍57 kg
Bronze medal – third place	2019 Lima	‍–‍57 kg
IJF Grand Prix
Bronze medal – third place	2017 Cancún	‍–‍57 kg

Profile at external databases
- IJF: 28920
- JudoInside.com: 67491
- Updated on 7 December 2022

Anailis Dorvigni (born 8 October 1991) is a Cuban judoka who won a bronze medal at the 2016 Pan American Judo Championships.

== Medals ==
Pan American Judo Championships
Year	Place	Medal	Category	Source
2016	La Habana (Cuba)	Bronze	–57 kg	
