= 2017 Asian Judo Championships =

Judo competition

- Host city: Hong Kong
- Dates: 26–28 May
- Main venue: Hong Kong Velodrome

The 2017 Asian Judo Championships were the 23rd edition of the Asian Judo Championships, and were held in Hong Kong from May 26 to May 28, 2017.

== Medal summary ==
=== Men ===
Event	Gold	Silver	Bronze
Extra lightweight −60 kg	Naohisa Takato; Japan	Mohammad Rashnonezhad; Iran	Pak Yong-nam; North Korea
Extra lightweight −60 kg	Naohisa Takato; Japan	Mohammad Rashnonezhad; Iran	Mukhriddin Tilovov; Uzbekistan
Half lightweight −66 kg	An Ba-ul; South Korea	Yeldos Zhumakanov; Kazakhstan	Taroh Fujisaka; Japan
Half lightweight −66 kg	An Ba-ul; South Korea	Yeldos Zhumakanov; Kazakhstan	Ganboldyn Kherlen; Mongolia
Lightweight −73 kg	An Chang-rim; South Korea	Ganbaataryn Odbayar; Mongolia	Zhansay Smagulov; Kazakhstan
Lightweight −73 kg	An Chang-rim; South Korea	Ganbaataryn Odbayar; Mongolia	Arata Tatsukawa; Japan
Half middleweight −81 kg	Sotaro Fujiwara; Japan	Saeid Mollaei; Iran	Vladimir Zoloev; Kyrgyzstan
Half middleweight −81 kg	Sotaro Fujiwara; Japan	Saeid Mollaei; Iran	Lee Moon-jin; South Korea
Middleweight −90 kg	Komronshokh Ustopiriyon; Tajikistan	Islam Bozbayev; Kazakhstan	Shoichiro Mukai; Japan
Middleweight −90 kg	Komronshokh Ustopiriyon; Tajikistan	Islam Bozbayev; Kazakhstan	Mukhammadkarim Khurramov; Uzbekistan
Half heavyweight −100 kg	Maxim Rakov; Kazakhstan	Kim Hyeon-cheol; South Korea	Bunddorjiin Janchivdorj; Mongolia
Half heavyweight −100 kg	Maxim Rakov; Kazakhstan	Kim Hyeon-cheol; South Korea	Sherali Juraev; Uzbekistan
Heavyweight +100 kg	Kim Sung-min; South Korea	Ryu Shichinohe; Japan	Ölziibayaryn Düürenbayar; Mongolia
Heavyweight +100 kg	Kim Sung-min; South Korea	Ryu Shichinohe; Japan	Iurii Krakovetskii; Kyrgyzstan
Team	South Korea	Mongolia	Iran
Team	South Korea	Mongolia	Japan

=== Women ===
Event	Gold	Silver	Bronze
Extra lightweight −48 kg	Mönkhbatyn Urantsetseg; Mongolia	Galbadrakhyn Otgontsetseg; Kazakhstan	Jeong Bo-kyeong; South Korea
Extra lightweight −48 kg	Mönkhbatyn Urantsetseg; Mongolia	Galbadrakhyn Otgontsetseg; Kazakhstan	Kang Yu-jeong; South Korea
Half lightweight −52 kg	Ai Shishime; Japan	Azzaya Chintogtokh; Mongolia	Wang Xin; China
Half lightweight −52 kg	Ai Shishime; Japan	Azzaya Chintogtokh; Mongolia	Park Da-sol; South Korea
Lightweight −57 kg	Tsukasa Yoshida; Japan	Kwon You-jeong; South Korea	Lien Chen-ling; Chinese Taipei
Lightweight −57 kg	Tsukasa Yoshida; Japan	Kwon You-jeong; South Korea	Lu Tongjuan; China
Half middleweight −63 kg	Nami Nabekura; Japan	Baldorjyn Möngönchimeg; Mongolia	Boldyn Gankhaich; Mongolia
Half middleweight −63 kg	Nami Nabekura; Japan	Baldorjyn Möngönchimeg; Mongolia	Kim Ji-jeong; South Korea
Middleweight −70 kg	Yoko Ono; Japan	Kim Seong-yeon; South Korea	Hong Son-yong; North Korea
Middleweight −70 kg	Yoko Ono; Japan	Kim Seong-yeon; South Korea	Zere Bektaskyzy; Kazakhstan
Half heavyweight −78 kg	Shori Hamada; Japan	Ma Zhenzhao; China	Lee Jeong-yun; South Korea
Half heavyweight −78 kg	Shori Hamada; Japan	Ma Zhenzhao; China	Park Yu-jin; South Korea
Heavyweight +78 kg	Nami Inamori; Japan	Kim Min-jeong; South Korea	Gulzhan Issanova; Kazakhstan
Heavyweight +78 kg	Nami Inamori; Japan	Kim Min-jeong; South Korea	Munkhtuya Battulga; Mongolia
Team	Japan	Mongolia	Chinese Taipei
Team	Japan	Mongolia	South Korea

== Medal table ==
Rank	Nation	Gold	Silver	Bronze	Total
1	Japan	9	1	4	14
2	South Korea	4	4	8	16
3	Mongolia	1	5	5	11
4	Kazakhstan	1	3	3	7
5	Tajikistan	1	0	0	1
6	Iran	0	2	1	3
7	China	0	1	2	3
8	Uzbekistan	0	0	3	3
9	Chinese Taipei	0	0	2	2
9	Kyrgyzstan	0	0	2	2
9	North Korea	0	0	2	2
Totals (11 entries)		16	16	32	64
