= Tsukasa Yoshida =

Japanese judoka (born 1995)

Personal information
- Native name: 芳田 司
- Nationality: Japanese
- Born: 5 October 1995 (age 30) Kyoto, Japan
- Occupation: Judoka
- Height: 156 cm (5 ft 1 in)

Sport
- Country: Japan
- Sport: Judo
- Weight class: ‍–‍57 kg
- Rank: 3rd dan black belt
- Club: Komatsu
- Retired: 11 July 2024

Achievements and titles
- Olympic Games: (bronze) (2020)
- World Champ.: (2018)
- Asian Champ.: (gold) (2017)
Medal record
Women's judo
Representing Japan
Olympic Games
Silver medal – second place	2020 Tokyo	Mixed team
Bronze medal – third place	2020 Tokyo	‍–‍57 kg
World Championships
Gold medal – first place	2018 Baku	‍–‍57 kg
Silver medal – second place	2017 Budapest	‍–‍57 kg
Silver medal – second place	2019 Tokyo	‍–‍57 kg
Asian Championships
Gold medal – first place	2017 Hong Kong	‍–‍57 kg
World Masters
Gold medal – first place	2018 Guangzhou	‍–‍57 kg
Gold medal – first place	2021 Doha	‍–‍57 kg
Silver medal – second place	2017 Saint Petersburg	‍–‍57 kg
Bronze medal – third place	2022 Jerusalem	‍–‍57 kg
IJF Grand Slam
Gold medal – first place	2015 Tyumen	‍–‍57 kg
Gold medal – first place	2015 Tokyo	‍–‍57 kg
Gold medal – first place	2016 Baku	‍–‍57 kg
Gold medal – first place	2016 Tyumen	‍–‍57 kg
Gold medal – first place	2016 Tokyo	‍–‍57 kg
Gold medal – first place	2017 Tokyo	‍–‍57 kg
Gold medal – first place	2019 Düsseldorf	‍–‍57 kg
Silver medal – second place	2018 Paris	‍–‍57 kg
Silver medal – second place	2019 Baku	‍–‍57 kg
Silver medal – second place	2022 Tokyo	‍–‍57 kg
Bronze medal – third place	2014 Tokyo	‍–‍57 kg
Bronze medal – third place	2017 Paris	‍–‍57 kg
Asian Junior Championships
Gold medal – first place	2012 Taipei	‍–‍57 kg
World Cadets Championships
Bronze medal – third place	2011 Kyiv	‍–‍57 kg

Profile at external databases
- IJF: 7353
- JudoInside.com: 76644
- Updated on 23 May 2023

Tsukasa Yoshida (芳田 司, Yoshida Tsukasa; born 5 October 1995) is a Japanese retired judoka. Yoshida won a bronze medal in the women's 57 kg competition, and silver medal in mixed team at the 2020 Olympics held in Tokyo, Japan.

== Career ==
She won a silver medal at the 2017 World Judo Championships in Budapest.

In 2021, she won the gold medal in her event at the 2021 Judo World Masters held in Doha, Qatar.
