= Judo World Masters =

Judo competition

Competition details
- Discipline: Judo
- Type: Annual
- Organiser: International Judo Federation (IJF)

History
- First edition: Suwon 2010
- Editions: 12
- Most recent: Budapest 2023
- Next edition: Dushanbe 2026

The Judo World Masters is an annual invite-only judo competition. After being open for only the top 16 ranked judoka in each weight class for its first eight installments, the tournament was expended to host the top 36 of each weight class in 2019. The world masters is the only world tour event with no limitation on the number of judoka competing from any single national association.

== Competitions ==
Edition	Year	Dates	City and host country	Venue	# Countries	# Athletes	Ref.
1	2010	16–17 January	Suwon, South Korea		33	168	
2	2011	15–16 January	Baku, Azerbaijan	Heydar Aliyev Sports and Concert Complex	41	205	
3	2012	14–15 January	Almaty, Kazakhstan		44	218	
4	2013	25–26 May	Tyumen, Russia		41	199	
5	2015	23–24 May	Rabat, Morocco		51	223	
6	2016	27–29 May	Guadalajara, Mexico	Lopez Mateo Sports Centre	51	233	
7	2017	16–17 December	Saint Petersburg, Russia	Yubileyny Sports Palace	46	214	
8	2018	15–16 December	Guangzhou, China	Guangzhou Gymnasium	53	231	
9	2019	12–14 December	Qingdao, China	Conson Gymnasium	67	445	
10	2021	11–13 January	Doha, Qatar	Lusail Sports Arena	69	398	
11	2022	20–22 December	Jerusalem, Israel	Pais Arena	58	367	
12	2023	4–6 August	Budapest, Hungary	László Papp Budapest Sports Arena	59	419	
13	2026	18–20 December	Dushanbe, Tajikistan				

== Past winners ==
=== Men's ===
Year	–60 kg	–66 kg	–73 kg	–81 kg	–90 kg	–100 kg	+100 kg	Ref.
2010	(Uzbekistan) Rishod Sobirov	(Mongolia) Sanjaasürengiin Miyaaragchaa	(South Korea) Bang Gui-man	(South Korea) Kim Jae-bum	(Japan) Takashi Ono	(Japan) Takamasa Anai	(France) Teddy Riner	
2011	(Uzbekistan) Rishod Sobirov	(Mongolia) Khashbaataryn Tsagaanbaatar	(South Korea) Wang Ki-chun	(Azerbaijan) Elnur Mammadli	(Azerbaijan) Elkhan Mammadov	(Russia) Sergei Samoilovich	(France) Teddy Riner	
2012	(Russia) Arsen Galstyan	(Mongolia) Sanjaasürengiin Miyaaragchaa	(South Korea) Wang Ki-chun	(Azerbaijan) Elnur Mammadli	(Japan) Masashi Nishiyama	(Kazakhstan) Maxim Rakov	(Brazil) Rafael Silva	
2013	(Japan) Naohisa Takato	(Kazakhstan) Sergey Lim	(Mongolia) Sainjargalyn Nyam-Ochir	(Russia) Ivan Nifontov	(Greece) Ilias Iliadis	(Azerbaijan) Elkhan Mammadov	(Georgia (country)) Adam Okruashvili	
2015	(Japan) Naohisa Takato	(Ukraine) Georgii Zantaraia	(Russia) Denis Iartsev	(Japan) Takanori Nagase	(Georgia (country)) Beka Gviniashvili	(Azerbaijan) Elmar Gasimov	(France) Teddy Riner	
2016	(Azerbaijan) Orkhan Safarov	(South Korea) An Ba-ul	(Japan) Soichi Hashimoto	(United States) Travis Stevens	(Japan) Mashu Baker	(Azerbaijan) Elmar Gasimov	(Romania) Daniel Natea	
2017	(Japan) Ryuju Nagayama	(Mongolia) Ganboldyn Kherlen	(Japan) Soichi Hashimoto	(Russia) Khasan Khalmurzaev	(Georgia (country)) Beka Gviniashvili	(Georgia (country)) Varlam Liparteliani	(Georgia (country)) Guram Tushishvili	
2018	(Russia) Robert Mshvidobadze	(Japan) Joshiro Maruyama	(Azerbaijan) Rustam Orujov	(Japan) Takeshi Sasaki	(Spain) Nikoloz Sherazadishvili	(Georgia (country)) Varlam Liparteliani	(Georgia (country)) Guram Tushishvili	
2019	(Japan) Ryuju Nagayama	(Italy) Manuel Lombardo	(Japan) Soichi Hashimoto	(Belgium) Matthias Casse	(Georgia (country)) Lasha Bekauri	(Netherlands) Michael Korrel	(Japan) Hisayoshi Harasawa	
2021	(South Korea) Kim Won-jin	(South Korea) An Ba-ul	(South Korea) An Chang-rim	(Georgia (country)) Tato Grigalashvili	(Netherlands) Noël van 't End	(Georgia (country)) Varlam Liparteliani	(France) Teddy Riner	
2022	(South Korea) Lee Ha-rim	(Israel) Baruch Shmailov	(Brazil) Daniel Cargnin	(Georgia (country)) Tato Grigalashvili	(Japan) Sanshiro Murao	(Georgia (country)) Ilia Sulamanidze	(Japan) Tatsuru Saito	
2023	(Japan) Ryuju Nagayama	(Japan) Ryoma Tanaka	(Japan) Soichi Hashimoto	(Belgium) Matthias Casse	(Georgia (country)) Lasha Bekauri	(Uzbekistan) Muzaffarbek Turoboyev	(Finland) Martti Puumalainen	

=== Women's ===
Year	–48 kg	–52 kg	–57 kg	–63 kg	–70 kg	–78 kg	+78 kg	Ref.
2010	(Japan) Haruna Asami	(Japan) Misato Nakamura	(Japan) Kaori Matsumoto	(Japan) Yoshie Ueno	(South Korea) Hwang Ye-sul	(France) Céline Lebrun	(China) Qin Qian	
2011	(Japan) Haruna Asami	(Japan) Misato Nakamura	(Portugal) Telma Monteiro	(France) Gévrise Émane	(France) Lucie Décosse	(China) Yang Xiuli	(Japan) Megumi Tachimoto	
2012	(Japan) Tomoko Fukumi	(Japan) Yuka Nishida	(Japan) Kaori Matsumoto	(Japan) Yoshie Ueno	(France) Lucie Décosse	(Brazil) Mayra Aguiar	(China) Qin Qian	
2013	(Japan) Hiromi Endō	(Kosovo) Majlinda Kelmendi	(Mongolia) Dorjsürengiin Sumiyaa	(Japan) Kana Abe	(Netherlands) Kim Polling	(Brazil) Mayra Aguiar	(China) Yu Song	
2015	(Mongolia) Mönkhbatyn Urantsetseg	(Russia) Natalia Kuziutina	(Mongolia) Dorjsürengiin Sumiyaa	(Japan) Miku Tashiro	(Netherlands) Kim Polling	(United States) Kayla Harrison	(China) Yu Song	
2016	(Japan) Ami Kondo	(Japan) Misato Nakamura	(Mongolia) Dorjsürengiin Sumiyaa	(Japan) Miku Tashiro	(Netherlands) Kim Polling	(United States) Kayla Harrison	(Cuba) Idalys Ortiz	
2017	(Japan) Funa Tonaki	(Russia) Natalia Kuziutina	(Mongolia) Dorjsürengiin Sumiyaa	(Japan) Miku Tashiro	(Brazil) Maria Portela	(Netherlands) Marhinde Verkerk	(South Korea) Kim Min-jeong	
2018	(Kosovo) Distria Krasniqi	(Japan) Natsumi Tsunoda	(Japan) Tsukasa Yoshida	(France) Clarisse Agbegnenou	(Japan) Saki Niizoe	(Japan) Mami Umeki	(Japan) Akira Sone	
2019	(Kosovo) Distria Krasniqi	(Japan) Ai Shishime	(North Korea) Kim Jin-a	(Japan) Nami Nabekura	(Netherlands) Kim Polling	(France) Fanny Estelle Posvite	(Netherlands) Tessie Savelkouls	
2021	(Kosovo) Distria Krasniqi	(France) Amandine Buchard	(Japan) Tsukasa Yoshida	(France) Clarisse Agbegnenou	(Japan) Yoko Ono	(France) Madeleine Malonga	(France) Romane Dicko	
2022	(France) Shirine Boukli	(Kosovo) Distria Krasniqi	(Canada) Christa Deguchi	(Japan) Miku Takaichi	(Austria) Michaela Polleres	(Italy) Alice Bellandi	(France) Romane Dicko	
2023	(Japan) Wakana Koga	(France) Amandine Buchard	(Canada) Jessica Klimkait	(Kosovo) Laura Fazliu	(Netherlands) Sanne van Dijke	(Israel) Inbar Lanir	(France) Romane Dicko	

== Points ==
As in any IJF World Tour tournament, athletes earn WRL points by competing in IJF World Masters events. Points are awarded based on judoka placement in the competition.

Place	1st	2nd	3rd	5th	7th	1/16th	participation
Points	1800	1260	900	648	468	288	200
