= Theresa Stoll =

German judoka (born 1995)

Personal information
- Nationality: German
- Born: 21 November 1995 (age 30) Munich, Germany
- Occupation: Judoka

Sport
- Country: Germany
- Sport: Judo
- Weight class: –57 kg

Achievements and titles
- Olympic Games: R16 (2020)
- World Champ.: (bronze) (2021)
- European Champ.: (silver) (2017, 2018)
Medal record
Women's judo
Representing Germany
Olympic Games
Bronze medal – third place	2020 Tokyo	Mixed team
World Championships
Bronze medal – third place	2021 Budapest	‍–‍57 kg
European Championships
Gold medal – first place	2018 Yekaterinburg	Mixed team
Silver medal – second place	2017 Warsaw	‍–‍57 kg
Silver medal – second place	2018 Tel Aviv	‍–‍57 kg
Bronze medal – third place	2016 Kazan	Women's team
Bronze medal – third place	2017 Warsaw	Women's team
Bronze medal – third place	2020 Prague	‍–‍57 kg
IJF Grand Slam
Silver medal – second place	2016 Abu Dhabi	‍–‍57 kg
Bronze medal – third place	2019 Brasilia	‍–‍57 kg
Bronze medal – third place	2021 Tashkent	‍–‍57 kg
Bronze medal – third place	2021 Kazan	‍–‍57 kg
IJF Grand Prix
Gold medal – first place	2017 Düsseldorf	‍–‍57 kg
Gold medal – first place	2018 Tbilisi	‍–‍57 kg
Gold medal – first place	2018 Tashkent	‍–‍57 kg
Silver medal – second place	2017 The Hague	‍–‍57 kg
Silver medal – second place	2018 Budapest	‍–‍57 kg
European U23 Championships
Gold medal – first place	2016 Tel Aviv	‍–‍57 kg
World Cadets Championships
Silver medal – second place	2011 Kyiv	‍–‍52 kg

Profile at external databases
- IJF: 8033
- JudoInside.com: 65442
- Updated on 23 May 2023

Theresa Stoll (born 21 November 1995) is a German judoka. She is the 2017 European silver medalist in the 57 kg division.

In 2020, she won one of the bronze medals in the women's 57 kg event at the 2020 European Judo Championships held in Prague, Czech Republic.

In 2021, she competed in the women's 57 kg event at the 2021 Judo World Masters held in Doha, Qatar. She also represented Germany at the 2020 Summer Olympics in Tokyo, Japan. She won one of the bronze medals in the mixed team event.
