= Hélène Receveaux =

French judoka (born 1991)

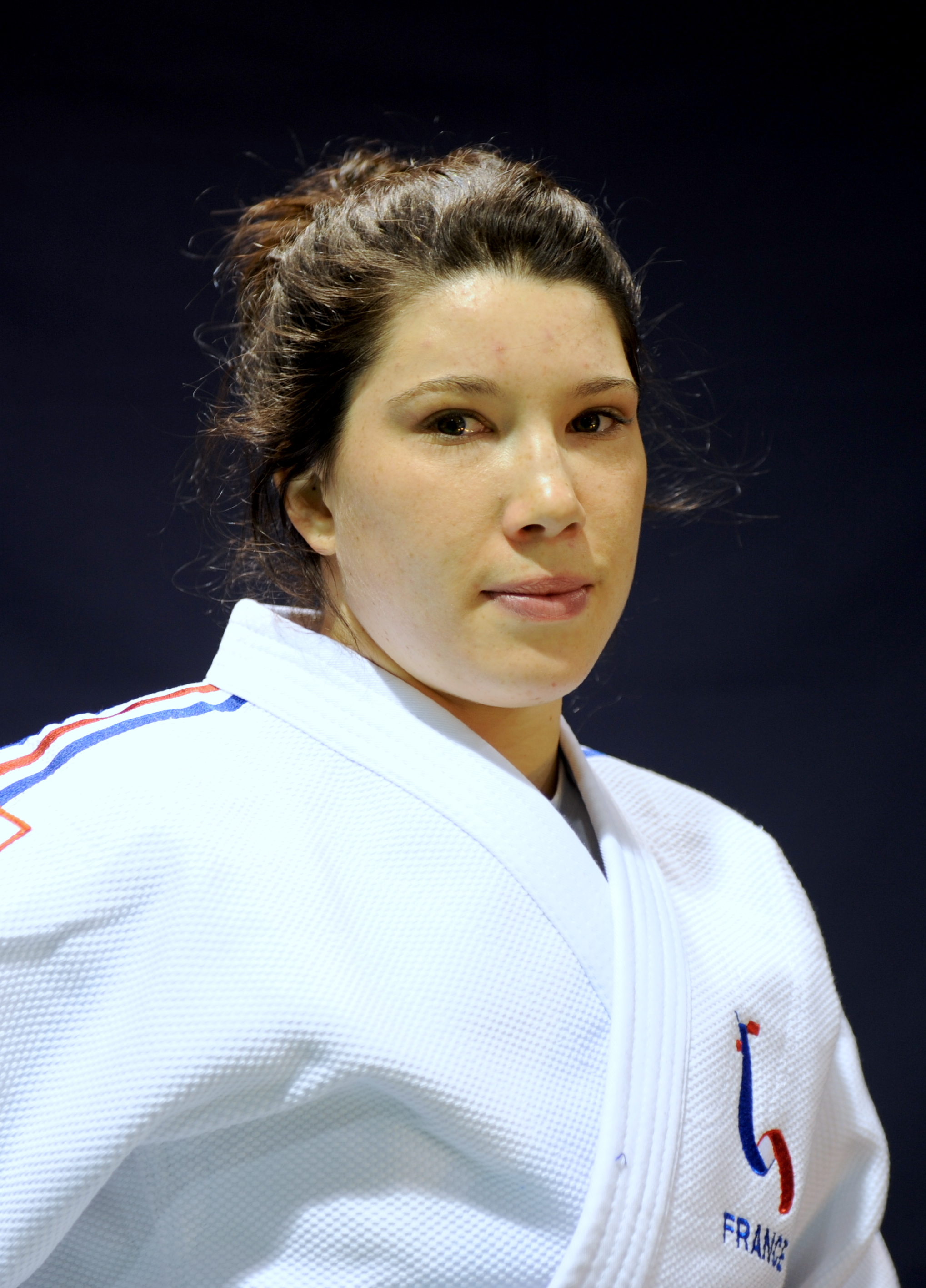

Personal information
- Born: 28 February 1991 (age 35) Chenôve, France
- Occupation: Judoka
- Height: 1.63 m (5 ft 4 in)

Sport
- Country: France
- Sport: Judo
- Weight class: ‍–‍57 kg

Achievements and titles
- World Champ.: (bronze) (2017)
- European Champ.: (bronze) (2017)
Medal record
Women's judo
Representing France
World Championships
Silver medal – second place	2018 Baku	Mixed team
Bronze medal – third place	2017 Budapest	‍–‍57 kg
Bronze medal – third place	2017 Budapest	Mixed team
European Championships
Bronze medal – third place	2017 Warsaw	‍–‍57 kg
World Masters
Silver medal – second place	2015 Rabat	‍–‍57 kg
Silver medal – second place	2016 Guadalajara	‍–‍57 kg
Bronze medal – third place	2017 Saint Petersburg	‍–‍57 kg
IJF Grand Slam
Gold medal – first place	2016 Abu Dhabi	‍–‍57 kg
Gold medal – first place	2021 Kazan	‍–‍57 kg
Silver medal – second place	2015 Tokyo	‍–‍57 kg
Silver medal – second place	2017 Paris	‍–‍57 kg
Silver medal – second place	2020 Budapest	‍–‍57 kg
Bronze medal – third place	2019 Baku	‍–‍57 kg
IJF Grand Prix
Gold medal – first place	2012 Abu Dhabi	‍–‍57 kg
Gold medal – first place	2016 Samsun	‍–‍57 kg
Silver medal – second place	2014 Budapest	‍–‍57 kg
Silver medal – second place	2014 Jeju	‍–‍57 kg
Silver medal – second place	2015 Ulaanbaatar	‍–‍57 kg
Silver medal – second place	2016 Düsseldorf	‍–‍57 kg
Silver medal – second place	2018 Tbilisi	‍–‍57 kg
Silver medal – second place	2020 Tel Aviv	‍–‍57 kg
Bronze medal – third place	2015 Tashkent	‍–‍57 kg
Bronze medal – third place	2019 Tbilisi	‍–‍57 kg
European U23 Championships
Silver medal – second place	2011 Tyumen	‍–‍57 kg
Bronze medal – third place	2010 Sarajevo	‍–‍57 kg
World Juniors Championships
Gold medal – first place	2010 Agadir	‍–‍57 kg
European Junior Championships
Gold medal – first place	2010 Samokov	‍–‍57 kg
Summer Universiade
Bronze medal – third place	2011 Shenzhen	‍–‍57 kg
Bronze medal – third place	2011 Shenzhen	Women's team
Bronze medal – third place	2013 Kazan	Women's team

Profile at external databases
- IJF: 3787
- JudoInside.com: 41873
- Updated on 21 May 2023

Hélène Receveaux (born 28 February 1991) is a French judoka. She is the 2017 European Championships bronze medalist in the ‍–‍57 kg division.
