= Priscilla Gneto =

French judoka (born 1991)

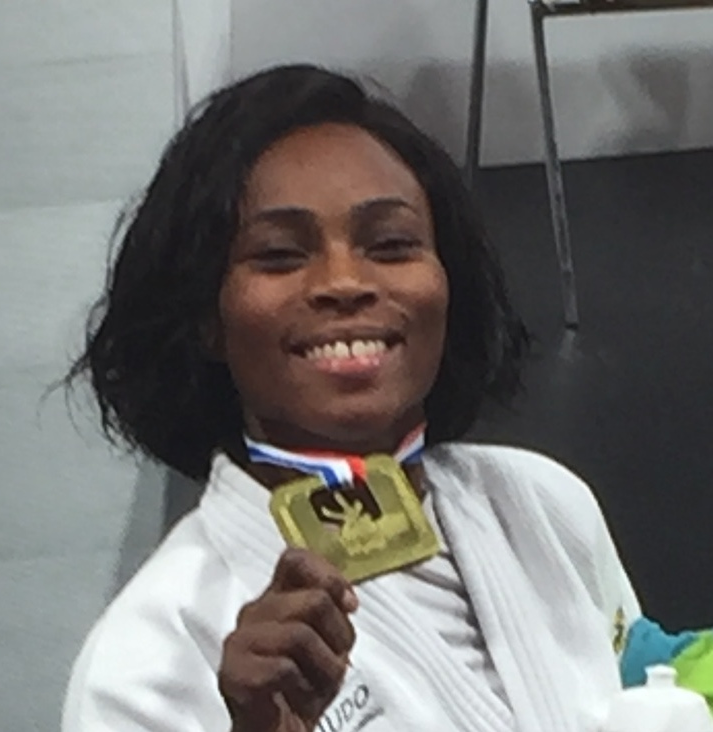
- Gneto showing her bronze medal during 2019 French Championship in Amiens

Personal information
- Nationality: French
- Born: 3 August 1991 (age 35) Abidjan, Ivory Coast
- Occupation: Judoka
- Height: 1.64 m (5 ft 5 in)

Sport
- Country: France
- Sport: Judo
- Weight class: ‍–‍52 kg, ‍–‍57 kg

Achievements and titles
- Olympic Games: (bronze) (2012)
- World Champ.: 5th (2011)
- European Champ.: (gold) (2017)
Medal record
Women's judo
Representing France
Olympic Games
Bronze medal – third place	2012 London	‍–‍52 kg
World Championships
Gold medal – first place	2014 Chelyabinsk	Women's team
Silver medal – second place	2018 Baku	Mixed team
Silver medal – second place	2023 Doha	Mixed team
Silver medal – second place	2024 Abu Dhabi	Mixed team
Bronze medal – third place	2013 Rio de Janeiro	Women's team
Bronze medal – third place	2017 Budapest	Mixed team
European Games
Bronze medal – third place	2019 Minsk	Mixed team
European Championships
Gold medal – first place	2011 Istanbul	Women's team
Gold medal – first place	2017 Warsaw	‍–‍57 kg
Gold medal – first place	2022 Mulhouse	Mixed team
Gold medal – first place	2024 Zagreb	Mixed team
Silver medal – second place	2012 Chelyabinsk	Women's team
Silver medal – second place	2013 Budapest	Women's team
Silver medal – second place	2016 Kazan	‍–‍52 kg
IJF Grand Slam
Gold medal – first place	2022 Tel Aviv	‍–‍57 kg
Gold medal – first place	2023 Paris	‍–‍57 kg
Gold medal – first place	2024 Tashkent	‍–‍57 kg
Silver medal – second place	2011 Tokyo	‍–‍52 kg
Silver medal – second place	2014 Baku	‍–‍52 kg
Silver medal – second place	2021 Abu Dhabi	‍–‍57 kg
Bronze medal – third place	2011 Paris	‍–‍52 kg
Bronze medal – third place	2015 Baku	‍–‍52 kg
Bronze medal – third place	2015 Paris	‍–‍52 kg
Bronze medal – third place	2015 Abu Dhabi	‍–‍52 kg
Bronze medal – third place	2016 Paris	‍–‍52 kg
Bronze medal – third place	2017 Paris	‍–‍57 kg
Bronze medal – third place	2018 Abu Dhabi	‍–‍57 kg
Bronze medal – third place	2022 Paris	‍–‍57 kg
Bronze medal – third place	2023 Baku	‍–‍57 kg
IJF Grand Prix
Gold medal – first place	2010 Qingdao	‍–‍52 kg
Gold medal – first place	2011 Baku	‍–‍52 kg
Gold medal – first place	2021 Zagreb	‍–‍57 kg
Silver medal – second place	2013 Miami	‍–‍52 kg
Silver medal – second place	2016 Düsseldorf	‍–‍52 kg
Bronze medal – third place	2015 Tashkent	‍–‍52 kg
Bronze medal – third place	2015 Jeju	‍–‍52 kg
Bronze medal – third place	2018 The Hague	‍–‍57 kg
World Juniors Championships
Bronze medal – third place	2010 Agadir	‍–‍52 kg
Mediterranean Games
Bronze medal – third place	2018 Tarragona	‍–‍57 kg

Profile at external databases
- IJF: 2375
- JudoInside.com: 48686
- Updated on 25 May 2024

Priscilla Gneto (born 3 August 1991) is a French judoka, Olympic bronze medalist at the London 2012 Summer Olympics.

On 12 November 2022 she won a gold medal at the 2022 European Mixed Team Judo Championships as part of team France.
