= Lien Chen-ling =

Taiwanese judoka (born 1988)

Personal information
- Native name: 連珍羚
- Born: 31 January 1988 (age 38) Taipei, Taiwan
- Occupations: Judoka, judo coach

Sport
- Country: Taiwan
- Sport: Judo
- Weight class: ‍–‍57 kg
- Retired: October 2024
- Now coaching: Komatsu’s judo club

Achievements and titles
- Olympic Games: 5th (2016)
- World Champ.: 7th (2009, 2017)
- Asian Champ.: (gold) (2023)
Medal record
Women's judo
Representing Chinese Taipei
Asian Games
Gold medal – first place	2023 Hangzhou	‍–‍57 kg
Bronze medal – third place	2010 Guangzhou	‍–‍57 kg
Bronze medal – third place	2018 Jakarta	‍–‍57 kg
Asian Championships
Silver medal – second place	2012 Tashkent	‍–‍57 kg
Silver medal – second place	2015 Kuwait City	‍–‍57 kg
Bronze medal – third place	2011 Abu Dhabi	‍–‍57 kg
Bronze medal – third place	2016 Tashkent	‍–‍57 kg
Bronze medal – third place	2017 Hong Kong	‍–‍57 kg
Bronze medal – third place	2022 Nur‑Sultan	‍–‍57 kg
IJF Grand Slam
Gold medal – first place	2017 Baku	‍–‍57 kg
Silver medal – second place	2015 Abu Dhabi	‍–‍57 kg
Silver medal – second place	2018 Ekaterinburg	‍–‍57 kg
Silver medal – second place	2019 Ekaterinburg	‍–‍57 kg
Silver medal – second place	2019 Osaka	‍–‍57 kg
Silver medal – second place	2021 Tashkent	‍–‍57 kg
Bronze medal – third place	2010 Tokyo	‍–‍57 kg
Bronze medal – third place	2012 Tokyo	‍–‍57 kg
Bronze medal – third place	2023 Tokyo	‍–‍57 kg
IJF Grand Prix
Gold medal – first place	2015 Budapest	‍–‍57 kg
Gold medal – first place	2019 Marrakesh	‍–‍57 kg
Bronze medal – third place	2015 Jeju	‍–‍57 kg
Bronze medal – third place	2016 Düsseldorf	‍–‍57 kg
Bronze medal – third place	2019 Perth	‍–‍57 kg
Asian Junior Championships
Bronze medal – third place	2005 Beirut	‍–‍57 kg
Bronze medal – third place	2007 Hyderabad	‍–‍57 kg
Summer Universiade
Bronze medal – third place	2013 Kazan	‍–‍57 kg

Profile at external databases
- IJF: 651
- JudoInside.com: 50362
- Updated on 3 December 2023

Lien Chen-ling (Chinese: 連珍羚; born 31 January 1988) is a Taiwanese retired judoka. She competed at the 2016 Summer Olympics in the women's 57 kg event, in which she lost the bronze medal match to Kaori Matsumoto. Judo World rank 7th in -57 kg in Female Seniors.

Lien also competed in the women's 57 kg event at the 2020 Summer Olympics held in Tokyo, Japan. Lien announced her retirement from competition in October 2024 and became a coach to a Japanese judo club sponsored by Komatsu Limited.

== Judo career ==
=== European Open Prague 2015 ===
Lien Chen-Ling won an IPPON in -57 kg at the European Open Prague 2015.

Round	Opponent	Nationality	State	Note
1	Lisson Jacqueline	GER	Win	Round 2
2	Zhou Ying	CHN	Win	Quarter-Final
3	Kim Jandi	KOR	Win	Semi-Final
4	Ilieva Ivelina	BUL	Win	Final

=== Grand Prix Budapest 2015 ===
Lien Chen-Ling won the gold medal via waza-ari in the Golden Score.

Round	Opponent	Nationality	State	Note
1	Knetig Emoke	HUN	Win	Round 2
2	Diedhiou Hortance	SEN	Win	Quarter-Final
3	Malloy Marti	USA	Win	Semi-Final
4	Waechter Viola	GER	Win	Final

=== Bakus Grand Slam 2017 ===
Lien Chen-Ling got a Waza-ari by Ashi-waza at 3:16. After 4 minutes, opponent did not get any score from her, Lien Chen-Ling became the champion in -57 kg at Bakus Grand Slam 2017.

Round	Opponent	Nationality	State	Note
1	Prudencio Gilmara	BRA	Win	Quarter-Final
2	Nishanbayeva Sevara	KAZ	Win	Semi-Final
3	Rogic Jovana	SRB	Win	Final

=== Marrakech Grand Prix 2019 ===
Go into the "Golden Score" after haven't get any score from both sides. In Golden Score, Lien Chen-Ling gets an IPPON via Osaekomi-waza. She won the gold medal in the -57 kg category at the Marrakech Grand Prix 2019.

Round	Opponent	Nationality	State	Note
1	Fadli Wissal	MAR	Win	Round 1
2	Kowalczyk Julia	POL	Win	Round 2
3	Lo Giudice Martina	ITA	Win	Quarter-Final
4	Pavia Antomne	FRA	Win	Semi-Final
5	Kuczera Anna	POL	Win	Final

== Post-retirement ==
Lien was selected to serve on an expert panel for the planning and preparation of the Taiwanese sports ministry in 2024.
