= Anastasia Konkina =

Russian judoka (born 1993)

Anastasiia Konkina
Personal information
- Born: 1 December 1993 (age 32) Samara, Russia
- Occupation: Judoka

Sport
- Country: Russia
- Sport: Judo
- Weight class: ‍–‍57 kg

Achievements and titles
- World Champ.: 7th (2021)
- European Champ.: (bronze) (2018)
Medal record
Women's judo
Representing Russia
World Championships
Bronze medal – third place	2018 Baku	Mixed team
Bronze medal – third place	2019 Tokyo	Mixed team
European Games
Gold medal – first place	2019 Minsk	Mixed team
European Championships
Bronze medal – third place	2018 Tel Aviv	‍–‍57 kg
Bronze medal – third place	2018 Yekaterinburg	Mixed team
IJF Grand Slam
Silver medal – second place	2018 Abu Dhabi	‍–‍57 kg
Bronze medal – third place	2017 Abu Dhabi	‍–‍57 kg
Bronze medal – third place	2020 Düsseldorf	‍–‍57 kg
IJF Grand Prix
Gold medal – first place	2016 Tashkent	‍–‍57 kg
Gold medal – first place	2016 Qingdao	‍–‍57 kg
European U23 Championships
Silver medal – second place	2014 Wrocław	‍–‍57 kg
Silver medal – second place	2015 Bratislava	‍–‍57 kg

Profile at external databases
- IJF: 14917
- JudoInside.com: 74679
- Updated on 11 November 2022

Anastasia Aleksandrovna Konkina (Russian: Анастасия Александровна Конкина; born 1 December 1993) is a Russian judoka.

Konkina participated at the 2018 World Judo Championships, winning a medal in the mixed team event.
