= Nekoda Smythe-Davis =

British judoka (born 1993)

Personal information
- Born: 22 April 1993 (age 33) London, England
- Occupation: Judoka
- Height: 5 ft 2 in (157 cm)

Sport
- Country: Great Britain
- Sport: Judo
- Weight class: ‍–‍57 kg
- Rank: 4th dan black belt
- Club: Ealing Judo Club
- Coached by: Jo Crowley
- Retired: May 2025

Achievements and titles
- Olympic Games: R16 (2016)
- World Champ.: (silver) (2018)
- European Champ.: 5th (2016)
- Commonwealth Games: (gold) (2014)
Medal record
Women's judo
Representing Great Britain
World Championships
Silver medal – second place	2018 Baku	‍–‍57 kg
Bronze medal – third place	2017 Budapest	‍–‍57 kg
IJF Grand Slam
Gold medal – first place	2018 Düsseldorf	‍–‍57 kg
Gold medal – first place	2019 Brasilia	‍–‍57 kg
Silver medal – second place	2015 Baku	‍–‍57 kg
Silver medal – second place	2016 Baku	‍–‍57 kg
Bronze medal – third place	2017 Abu Dhabi	‍–‍57 kg
Bronze medal – third place	2018 Paris	‍–‍57 kg
IJF Grand Prix
Gold medal – first place	2015 Zagreb	‍–‍57 kg
Silver medal – second place	2015 Jeju	‍–‍57 kg
Silver medal – second place	2017 Zagreb	‍–‍57 kg
Silver medal – second place	2023 Perth	‍–‍57 kg
Bronze medal – third place	2014 Astana	‍–‍57 kg
Bronze medal – third place	2015 Samsun	‍–‍57 kg
Bronze medal – third place	2016 Düsseldorf	‍–‍57 kg
Bronze medal – third place	2016 Samsun	‍–‍57 kg
Bronze medal – third place	2019 Tel Aviv	‍–‍57 kg
Bronze medal – third place	2019 Zagreb	‍–‍57 kg
Bronze medal – third place	2023 Almada	‍–‍57 kg
European Junior Championships
Bronze medal – third place	2013 Sarajevo	‍–‍57 kg
Representing England
Commonwealth Games
Gold medal – first place	2014 Glasgow	‍–‍57 kg

Profile at external databases
- IJF: 12678
- JudoInside.com: 57541
- Updated on 16 May 2025

Nekoda Smythe-Davis (born 22 April 1993) is a British retired judoka. She competed for England in the women's 57 kg event at the 2014 Commonwealth Games where she won a gold medal.

== Judo career ==
Smythe-Davis became national champion of Great Britain on two occasions, winning the lightweight division at the British Judo Championships in 2013 and 2014. In 2014, she was selected to represent England at the 2014 Commonwealth Games in Glasgow. Competing in the women's 57 kg category she won the gold medal after defeating Stephanie Inglis in the final.

In May 2019, Smythe-Davis was selected to compete at the 2019 European Games in Minsk, Belarus.
