= Jovana Rogić =

Serbian judoka (born 1988)

Personal information
- Nationality: Serbian
- Born: 2 August 1988 (age 37) Novi Sad, SR Serbia, SFR Yugoslavia
- Occupation: Judoka

Sport
- Country: Serbia
- Sport: Judo, Sambo
- Weight class: ‍–‍57 kg
- Club: JK "Slavija" Novi Sad
- Retired: 14 June 2021

Achievements and titles
- World Champ.: R16 (2017, 2019)
- European Champ.: 7th (2010, 2013)
Medal record
Women's judo
Representing Serbia
European Championships
Bronze medal – third place	2006 Belgrade	Women's team
IJF Grand Slam
Gold medal – first place	2012 Rio de Janeiro	‍–‍57 kg
Silver medal – second place	2017 Baku	‍–‍57 kg
Bronze medal – third place	2012 Moscow	‍–‍57 kg
Bronze medal – third place	2016 Tyumen	‍–‍57 kg
IJF Grand Prix
Silver medal – second place	2014 Tbilisi	‍–‍57 kg
Bronze medal – third place	2013 Miami	‍–‍57 kg
Bronze medal – third place	2013 Jeju	‍–‍57 kg
Bronze medal – third place	2014 Zagreb	‍–‍57 kg
Bronze medal – third place	2014 Tashkent	‍–‍57 kg
Bronze medal – third place	2014 Qingdao	‍–‍57 kg
Bronze medal – third place	2017 Düsseldorf	‍–‍57 kg
European U23 Championships
Silver medal – second place	2010 Sarajevo	‍–‍57 kg
European Cadet Championships
Bronze medal – third place	2003 Baku	‍–‍52 kg
European Youth Olympic Festival
Silver medal – second place	2003 Paris	‍–‍52 kg
Women's sambo
World Championships
Bronze medal – third place	2016 Sofia	‍–‍56 kg
Bronze medal – third place	2017 Sochi	‍–‍56 kg

Profile at external databases
- IJF: 2799
- JudoInside.com: 31042
- Updated on 25 November 2022

Jovana Rogić (Serbian Cyrillic: Јована Рогић; born 2 August 1988) is a Serbian retired judoka and sambist. She won the IJF Grand Slam in Rio de Janeiro in 2012.

As a senior, Rogić won 13 World Cup medals between 2012 and 2017 in 13 cities. During her youth career, she won a silver medal at the European U23 Championships in 2010, as well as a silver medal at European Youth Olympic Festival (EYOF) and a bronze medal at European Cadet Championships in 2003, respectively.

She also competed in Sambo and won bronze medals at World Sambo Championships in 2016 and 2017.

Rogić announced her retirement on 14 June 2021.

== Achievements ==
Year	Tournament	Place	Weight class
2017	World Sambo Championships	3rd	−56 kg
2017	Grand Slam Baku	2nd	−57 kg
2017	Grand Prix Düsseldorf	3rd	−57 kg
2016	World Sambo Championships	3rd	−56 kg
2016	Grand Slam Tyumen	3rd	−57 kg
2014	Grand Prix Qingdao	3rd	−57 kg
2014	Grand Prix Tashkent	3rd	−57 kg
2014	Grand Prix Zagreb	3rd	−57 kg
2014	Grand Prix Tbilisi	2nd	−57 kg
2013	Grand Prix Jeju	3rd	−57 kg
2013	Grand Prix Miami	3rd	−57 kg
2013	European Championships	7th	−57 kg
2012	Grand Slam Rio de Janeiro	1st	−57 kg
2012	Grand Slam Moscow	3rd	−57 kg
2010	European U23 Championships	2nd	−57 kg
2010	European Championships	7th	−57 kg
2004	European Championships	7th	−52 kg
2003	European Cadet Championships	3rd	−52 kg
2003	European Youth Olympic Festival	2nd	−52 kg
