= Julia Kowalczyk =

Polish judoka (born 1997)

Personal information
- Nationality: Polish
- Born: 30 September 1997 (age 28)
- Occupation: Judoka

Sport
- Country: Poland
- Sport: Judo
- Weight class: –57 kg

Achievements and titles
- Olympic Games: 7th (2020)
- World Champ.: (bronze) (2019)
- European Champ.: 7th (2020)
Medal record
Women's judo
Representing Poland
World Championships
Bronze medal – third place	2019 Tokyo	‍–‍57 kg
IJF Grand Slam
Bronze medal – third place	2017 Baku	‍–‍57 kg
Bronze medal – third place	2021 Antalya	‍–‍57 kg
IJF Grand Prix
Gold medal – first place	2019 Antalya	‍–‍57 kg
Silver medal – second place	2019 Perth	‍–‍57 kg
Bronze medal – third place	2019 Montreal	‍–‍57 kg
European U23 Championships
Gold medal – first place	2018 Győr	‍–‍57 kg
European Junior Championships
Bronze medal – third place	2015 Oberwart	‍–‍57 kg
Bronze medal – third place	2016 Málaga	‍–‍57 kg
Bronze medal – third place	2017 Maribor	‍–‍57 kg
European Cadet Championships
Bronze medal – third place	2014 Athens	‍–‍57 kg

Profile at external databases
- IJF: 19867
- JudoInside.com: 85595
- Updated on 23 May 2023

Julia Kowalczyk (born 30 September 1997) is a Polish judoka.

She won the gold medal in the women's 57 kg event at the 2018 European U23 Judo Championships held in Győr, Hungary.

She won a medal at the 2019 World Judo Championships.

In 2021, she won one of the bronze medals in her event at the Judo Grand Slam Antalya held in Antalya, Turkey. In June 2021, she competed in the women's 57 kg event at the World Judo Championships held in Budapest, Hungary.

She competed in the women's 57 kg event at the 2020 Summer Olympics held in Tokyo, Japan.
