= Ivelina Ilieva =

Bulgarian judoka (born 1991)

Personal information
- Born: 16 August 1991 (age 34) Haskovo, Bulgaria
- Occupation: Judoka

Sport
- Country: Bulgaria
- Sport: Judo
- Weight class: –57 kg

Achievements and titles
- Olympic Games: R16 (2020)
- World Champ.: 5th (2019)
- European Champ.: (silver) (2016)
Medal record
Women's judo
Representing Bulgaria
European Championships
Silver medal – second place	2016 Kazan	‍–‍57 kg
IJF Grand Slam
Bronze medal – third place	2022 Baku	‍–‍57 kg
IJF Grand Prix
Silver medal – second place	2019 Tashkent	‍–‍57 kg
Bronze medal – third place	2014 Jeju	‍–‍57 kg
Bronze medal – third place	2017 Zagreb	‍–‍57 kg
Bronze medal – third place	2019 Tel Aviv	‍–‍57 kg
European U23 Championships
Bronze medal – third place	2010 Sarajevo	‍–‍63 kg
Bronze medal – third place	2012 Prague	‍–‍57 kg
Bronze medal – third place	2013 Samokov	‍–‍57 kg
World Juniors Championships
Bronze medal – third place	2010 Agadir	‍–‍57 kg
European Junior Championships
Silver medal – second place	2010 Samokov	‍–‍57 kg
European Cadet Championships
Silver medal – second place	2007 Valletta	‍–‍57 kg

Profile at external databases
- IJF: 1034
- JudoInside.com: 45754
- Updated on 21 May 2023

Ivelina Ilieva (Bulgarian: Ивелина Илиева) (born 16 August 1991) is a Bulgarian judoka and a multiple Bulgarian judo champion. She competed in the women's 57 kg event at the 2020 Summer Olympics held in Tokyo, Japan.

Ilieva is the silver medalist of the 2016 European Judo Championships in the ‍–‍57 kg category. She won world bronze in SAMBO in 2011 and 2010.
