= Sevara Nishanbayeva =

Kazakhstani judoka (born 1993)

Personal information
- Born: 15 August 1993 (age 32)
- Occupation: Judoka

Sport
- Country: Kazakhstan
- Sport: Judo
- Weight class: ‍–‍57 kg

Achievements and titles
- World Champ.: R16 (2021)
- Asian Champ.: (bronze) (2019, 2021)
Medal record
Women's judo
Representing Kazakhstan
Asian Championships
Bronze medal – third place	2019 Fujairah	‍–‍57 kg
Bronze medal – third place	2021 Bishkek	‍–‍57 kg
IJF Grand Prix
Bronze medal – third place	2013 Almaty	‍–‍57 kg
Bronze medal – third place	2016 Tashkent	‍–‍57 kg
Bronze medal – third place	2017 Tashkent	‍–‍57 kg
Asian Cadet Championships
Gold medal – first place	2008 Sanaa	‍–‍63 kg

Profile at external databases
- IJF: 11228
- JudoInside.com: 58497
- Updated on 6 December 2022

Sevara Nishanbayeva (Севара Пахритдиновна Нишанбаева, born 15 August 1993) is a Kazakhstani judoka.

Nishanbayeva is a bronze medalist from the 2017 Judo Grand Prix Tashkent in the ‍–‍57 kg category.
