= 2017 European Judo Championships – Women's 52 kg =

Judo competition

Judo Women's 52 kg at the 2017 European Judo Championships
- Venue: Torwar Hall
- Location: Warsaw, Poland
- Date: April 20, 2017
- Competitors: 26 from 18 nations

Medalists
gold medal	Majlinda Kelmendi (3rd title)	Kosovo
silver medal	Alesya Kuznetsova	Russia
bronze medal	Evelyne Tschopp	Switzerland
bronze medal	Joana Ramos	Portugal

Competition at external databases
- Links: IJF • JudoInside

The women's 52 kg competition at the 2017 European Judo Championships in Warsaw was held on 20 April at the Torwar Hall.

== Results ==
=== Finals ===
Semi-finals
Majlinda Kelmendi (KOS)	100
Joana Ramos (POR)	000
Alesya Kuznetsova (RUS)	020
Odette Giuffrida (ITA)	000

Final
Majlinda Kelmendi (KOS)	110
Alesya Kuznetsova (RUS)	000

=== Repechages ===
Repechage		Bronze medal
Evelyne Tschopp (SUI)	130
Alexandra-Larisa Florian (ROU)	000	Evelyne Tschopp (SUI)	010
		Odette Giuffrida (ITA)	000

Repechage		Bronze medal
Gili Cohen (ISR)	010
Distria Krasniqi (KOS)	000	Gili Cohen (ISR)	000
		Joana Ramos (POR)	010

=== Pool A ===
First round		Second round		Quarterfinals
		Majlinda Kelmendi (KOS)	030
Chelsie Giles (GBR)	020	Chelsie Giles (GBR)	000
Karolina Pieńkowska (POL)	000			Majlinda Kelmendi (KOS)	120
Darya Skrypnik (BLR)	010			Evelyne Tschopp (SUI)	010
Charline Van Snick (BEL)	000	Darya Skrypnik (BLR)	000
Evelyne Tschopp (SUI)	100	Evelyne Tschopp (SUI)	110
Ariel Bezalel (ISR)	000

=== Pool B ===
First round
Nazakat Azizova (AZE)	000
Réka Pupp (HUN)	100
Joana Ramos (POR)	100
Madelene Rubinstein (NOR)	000

Second round
Alexandra-Larisa Florian (ROU)	101
Réka Pupp (HUN)	000
Andreea Chițu (ROU)	010
Joana Ramos (POR)	100

Quarterfinals
Alexandra-Larisa Florian (ROU)	000
Joana Ramos (POR)	120

=== Pool C ===
First round		Second round		Quarterfinals
		Gili Cohen (ISR)	100
Myriam Blavier (BEL)	000	Leandra Freitas (POR)	000
Leandra Freitas (POR)	000			Gili Cohen (ISR)	000
Amandine Buchard (FRA)	000			Alesya Kuznetsova (RUS)	100
Kelly Edwards (GBR)	000	Kelly Edwards (GBR)	000
Tena Sikic (CRO)	000	Alesya Kuznetsova (RUS)	100
Alesya Kuznetsova (RUS)	110

=== Pool D ===
First round
Bernadett Keliger (HUN)	000
Agata Perenc (POL)	010
Sose Balasanyan (ARM)	000
İrem Korkmaz (TUR)	100

Second round
Distria Krasniqi (KOS)	100
Agata Perenc (POL)	000
Odette Giuffrida (ITA)	100
İrem Korkmaz (TUR)	000

Quarterfinals
Distria Krasniqi (KOS)	000
Odette Giuffrida (ITA)	100
