= 2018 World Judo Championships – Women's 52 kg =

Judo Women's 52 kg at the 2018 World Judo Championships
- Venue: National Gymnastics Arena
- Location: Baku, Azerbaijan
- Dates: 21 September
- Competitors: 45 from 35 nations
- Total prize money: 57,000€

Medalists
gold medal	Uta Abe (1st title)	Japan
silver medal	Ai Shishime	Japan
bronze medal	Érika Miranda	Brazil
bronze medal	Amandine Buchard	France

Competition at external databases
- Links: IJF • JudoInside

The women's 52 kg competition at the 2018 World Judo Championships was held on 21 September 2018.

== Results ==
=== Finals ===
Semi-finals
(France) Amandine Buchard	00
(Japan) Uta Abe	10
(Japan) Ai Shishime	01
(Brazil) Érika Miranda	00

Final
(Japan) Uta Abe	10
(Japan) Ai Shishime	00

=== Repechage ===
Repechage
(Israel) Gefen Primo	00
(Brazil) Jessica Pereira	01

Third place
(Brazil) Jessica Pereira	00
(Brazil) Érika Miranda	10

Repechage
(Russia) Natalia Kuziutina	00
(Belgium) Charline Van Snick	01

Third place
(Belgium) Charline Van Snick	00
(France) Amandine Buchard	01

=== Pool A ===
First round
(Hong Kong) Tsui Shuk-ki	00
(China) Wu Shugen	10
(Russia) Yulia Kazarina	10
(South Korea) Park Da-sol	00

Second round
(France) Amandine Buchard	11
(China) Wu Shugen	00
(Norway) Madelene Rubinstein	00
(Portugal) Joana Ramos	10
(United States) Angelica Delgado	10
(Russia) Yulia Kazarina	00
(Israel) Gefen Primo	10
(Italy) Odette Giuffrida	01

Third round
(France) Amandine Buchard	11
(Portugal) Joana Ramos	00
(United States) Angelica Delgado	00
(Israel) Gefen Primo	01

Quarterfinals
(France) Amandine Buchard	01
(Israel) Gefen Primo	00

=== Pool B ===
First round
(Spain) Ana Pérez	00
(Poland) Karolina Pieńkowska	01
(Switzerland) Fabienne Kocher	10
(Canada) Ecaterina Guica	00
(Hungary) Emőke Knetig	00
(Vietnam) Nguyễn Thủy	10

Second round
(Japan) Uta Abe	10
(Poland) Karolina Pieńkowska	00
(Morocco) Fatima El Qorachi	00
(Switzerland) Fabienne Kocher	10
(Brazil) Jessica Pereira	10
(Vietnam) Nguyễn Thủy	00
(Mongolia) Ganbold Gantsetseg	00
(Australia) Tinka Easton	01

Third round
(Japan) Uta Abe	11
(Switzerland) Fabienne Kocher	00
(Brazil) Jessica Pereira	11
(Australia) Tinka Easton	01

Quarterfinals
(Japan) Uta Abe	10
(Brazil) Jessica Pereira	00

=== Pool C ===
First round
(Romania) Andreea Chițu	10
(Peru) Brillith Gamarra	00
(Hungary) Réka Pupp	01
(Israel) Betina Temelkova	00
(Ivory Coast) Salimata Fofana	00
(Portugal) Mariana Esteves	10
(Turkey) İrem Korkmaz	10
(Belarus) Kseniya Danilovich	00

Second round
(Russia) Natalia Kuziutina	01
(Romania) Andreea Chițu	00
(Hungary) Réka Pupp	00
(Switzerland) Evelyne Tschopp	01
(Japan) Ai Shishime	10
(Portugal) Mariana Esteves	00
(Turkey) İrem Korkmaz	00
(Poland) Agata Perenc	10

Third round
(Russia) Natalia Kuziutina	10
(Switzerland) Evelyne Tschopp	00
(Japan) Ai Shishime	10
(Poland) Agata Perenc	01

Quarterfinals
(Russia) Natalia Kuziutina	00
(Japan) Ai Shishime	01

=== Pool D ===
First round
(Cape Verde) Djamila Silva	00
(Finland) Katri Kakko	01
(North Korea) Rim Song-sim	00
(Slovenia) Petra Nareks	01
(Azerbaijan) Purevsuren Buyankhishig	00
(United Kingdom) Chelsie Giles	10

Second round
(Brazil) Érika Miranda	10
(Finland) Katri Kakko	00
(Slovenia) Petra Nareks	10
(Mozambique) Jacira Ferreira	00
(Belgium) Charline Van Snick	10
(United Kingdom) Chelsie Giles	00
(Uzbekistan) Gulnoza Ziyaeva	00
(Mongolia) Bishrelt Khorloodoi	10

Third round
(Brazil) Érika Miranda	10
(Slovenia) Petra Nareks	00
(Belgium) Charline Van Snick	01
(Mongolia) Bishrelt Khorloodoi	00

Quarterfinals
(Brazil) Érika Miranda	10
(Belgium) Charline Van Snick	00

== Prize money ==
The sums listed bring the total prizes awarded to 57,000€ for the individual event.

Medal	Total	Judoka	Coach
Gold	26,000€	20,800€	5,200€
Silver	15,000€	12,000€	3,000€
Bronze	8,000€	6,400€	1,600€
