= 2019 World Judo Championships – Women's 52 kg =

Judo competition

Judo Women's 52 kg at the 2019 World Judo Championships
- Venue: Nippon Budokan
- Location: Tokyo, Japan
- Date: 26 August
- Competitors: 56 from 47 nations
- Total prize money: 57,000$

Medalists
gold medal	Uta Abe (2nd title)	Japan
silver medal	Natalia Kuziutina	Russia
bronze medal	Majlinda Kelmendi	Kosovo
bronze medal	Ai Shishime	Japan

Competition at external databases
- Links: IJF • JudoInside

The Women's 52 kg competition at the 2019 World Judo Championships was held on 26 August 2019.

== Results ==
=== Finals ===
Semi-finals
(France) Amandine Buchard	00
(Russia) Natalia Kuziutina	01
(Japan) Uta Abe	10
(Kosovo) Majlinda Kelmendi	00

Final
(Russia) Natalia Kuziutina	00
(Japan) Uta Abe	10

=== Repechage ===
Repechage
(Portugal) Joana Ramos	10
(Belgium) Charline Van Snick	00

Third place
(Portugal) Joana Ramos	00
(Kosovo) Majlinda Kelmendi	10

Repechage
(United Kingdom) Chelsie Giles	00
(Japan) Ai Shishime	01

Third place
(Japan) Ai Shishime	10
(France) Amandine Buchard	00

=== Pool A ===
First round
(Belarus) Kseniya Danilovich	00
(Madagascar) Tessia Tsiorinirina	01
(Georgia (country)) Tetiana Levytska-Shukvani	11
(Poland) Aleksandra Kaleta	00
(Vietnam) Nguyễn Thủy	01
(Kazakhstan) Anna Kazyulina	00
(Spain) Ana Pérez	11
(Philippines) Khrizzie Pabulayan	01
(United States) Angelica Delgado	01
(Brazil) Eleudis Valentim	00
(Cape Verde) Djamila Silva	00
(Portugal) Joana Ramos	11
(Thailand) Kachakorn Warasiha	10
(Finland) Katri Kakko	00

Second round
(France) Amandine Buchard	10
(Madagascar) Tessia Tsiorinirina	00
(Georgia (country)) Tetiana Levytska-Shukvani	00
(Vietnam) Nguyễn Thủy	01
(Spain) Ana Pérez	11
(United States) Angelica Delgado	00
(Portugal) Joana Ramos	10
(Thailand) Kachakorn Warasiha	00

Third round
(France) Amandine Buchard	10
(Vietnam) Nguyễn Thủy	00
(Spain) Ana Pérez	00
(Portugal) Joana Ramos	01

Quarterfinals
(France) Amandine Buchard	10
(Portugal) Joana Ramos	00

=== Pool B ===
First round
(Switzerland) Fabienne Kocher	00
(Canada) Ecaterina Guica	10
(Chad) Fatime Barka	00
(China) Liu Liping	10
(Turkmenistan) Gülbadam Babamuratowa	10
(Mauritius) Christianne Legentil	00
(Hong Kong) Tsui Shuk-ki	00
(Azerbaijan) Alexandra-Larisa Florian	10
(Mongolia) Lkhagvasuren Sosorbaram	01
(Slovenia) Anja Štangar	00
(Morocco) Soumiya Iraoui	00
(Italy) Odette Giuffrida	10

Second round
(Belgium) Charline Van Snick	10
(Canada) Ecaterina Guica	00
(China) Liu Liping	10
(Turkmenistan) Gülbadam Babamuratowa	00
(Russia) Natalia Kuziutina	10
(Azerbaijan) Alexandra-Larisa Florian	00
(Mongolia) Lkhagvasuren Sosorbaram	00
(Italy) Odette Giuffrida	10

Third round
(Belgium) Charline Van Snick	11
(China) Liu Liping	00
(Russia) Natalia Kuziutina	01
(Italy) Odette Giuffrida	00

Quarterfinals
(Belgium) Charline Van Snick	00
(Russia) Natalia Kuziutina	10

=== Pool C ===
First round
(Djibouti) Raguib Abdourahman	00
(Brazil) Larissa Pimenta	10
(Azerbaijan) Gultaj Mammadaliyeva	11
(Mozambique) Jacira Ferreira	00
(Uzbekistan) Diyora Keldiyorova	10
(Portugal) Joana Diogo	00
(Turkey) İrem Korkmaz	00
(Spain) Estrella López	10
(Israel) Gefen Primo	00
(United Kingdom) Chelsie Giles	10
(Mongolia) Bishreltiin Khorloodoi	10
(Guinea-Bissau) Taciana Lima	01

Second round
(Japan) Uta Abe	11
(Brazil) Larissa Pimenta	00
(Azerbaijan) Gultaj Mammadaliyeva	00
(Uzbekistan) Diyora Keldiyorova	10
(Switzerland) Evelyne Tschopp	01
(Spain) Estrella López	00
(United Kingdom) Chelsie Giles	11
(Mongolia) Bishreltiin Khorloodoi	00

Third round
(Japan) Uta Abe	10
(Uzbekistan) Diyora Keldiyorova	00
(Switzerland) Evelyne Tschopp	00
(United Kingdom) Chelsie Giles	10

Quarterfinals
(Japan) Uta Abe	01
(United Kingdom) Chelsie Giles	00

=== Pool D ===
First round
(Belgium) Amber Ryheul	10
(Myanmar) Khin Khin Su	00
(Russia) Alesya Kuznetsova	00
(South Korea) Park Da-sol	01
(Hungary) Réka Pupp	10
(Romania) Andreea Chițu	00
(Norway) Madelene Rubinstein	00
(Mexico) Luz Olvera	01
(Haiti) Sabiana Anestor	00
(Australia) Tinka Easton	10
(Poland) Agata Perenc	10
(Ivory Coast) Salimata Fofana	00

Second round
(Japan) Ai Shishime	10
(Belgium) Amber Ryheul	00
(South Korea) Park Da-sol	00
(Hungary) Réka Pupp	01
(Kosovo) Majlinda Kelmendi	10
(Mexico) Luz Olvera	00
(Australia) Tinka Easton	00
(Poland) Agata Perenc	01

Third round
(Japan) Ai Shishime	01
(Hungary) Réka Pupp	00
(Kosovo) Majlinda Kelmendi	01
(Poland) Agata Perenc	00

Quarterfinals
(Japan) Ai Shishime	00
(Kosovo) Majlinda Kelmendi	10

== Prize money ==
The sums listed bring the total prizes awarded to $57,000 for the individual event.

Medal	Total	Judoka	Coach
Gold	$26,000	$20,800	$5,200
Silver	$15,000	$12,000	$3,000
Bronze	$8,000	$6,400	$1,600
