= 2017 World Judo Championships – Women's 52 kg =

Judo Women's 52 kg at the 2017 World Judo Championships
- Venue: László Papp Budapest Sports Arena
- Location: Budapest, Hungary
- Dates: 29 August
- Competitors: 52 from 43 nations
- Total prize money: 57,000$

Medalists
gold medal	Ai Shishime (1st title)	Japan
silver medal	Natsumi Tsunoda	Japan
bronze medal	Natalia Kuziutina	Russia
bronze medal	Érika Miranda	Brazil

Competition at external databases
- Links: IJF • JudoInside

The Women's 52 kg competition at the 2017 World Judo Championships was held on 29 August 2017.

== Results ==
=== Finals ===
Semi-finals
(Kosovo) Majlinda Kelmendi	00
(Japan) Ai Shishime	01
(Japan) Natsumi Tsunoda	02
(Israel) Gili Cohen	00

Final
(Japan) Ai Shishime	10
(Japan) Natsumi Tsunoda	00

=== Repechage ===
Repechage
(France) Amandine Buchard	000
(Russia) Natalia Kuziutina	10

Third place
(Russia) Natalia Kuziutina	10
(Israel) Gili Cohen	00

Repechage
(Brazil) Érika Miranda	01
(Kosovo) Distria Krasniqi	00

Third place
(Brazil) Érika Miranda	01
(Kosovo) Majlinda Kelmendi	00

=== Pool A ===
First round
(South Korea) Kwon Ae-rim	00
(Switzerland) Evelyne Tschopp	01
(Peru) Brillith Gamarra	00
(Panama) Kristine Jiménez	00
(Ukraine) Lyudmyla Pliieva	00
(Vietnam) Thuy Nguyen	00
(Portugal) Joana Ramos	10
(United Kingdom) Kelly Edwards	00
(China) Wang Xin	01
(Belarus) Darya Skrypnik	00

Second round
(Kosovo) Majlinda Kelmendi	11
(Switzerland) Evelyne Tschopp	00
(Panama) Kristine Jiménez	01
(Italy) Odette Giuffrida	10
(France) Amandine Buchard	01
(Ukraine) Lyudmyla Pliieva	00
(Portugal) Joana Ramos	10
(China) Wang Xin	00

Third round
(Kosovo) Majlinda Kelmendi	10
(Italy) Odette Giuffrida	00
(France) Amandine Buchard	01
(Portugal) Joana Ramos	00

Quarterfinals
(Kosovo) Majlinda Kelmendi	02
(France) Amandine Buchard	00

=== Pool B ===
First round
(Mongolia) Bishreltiin Khorloodoi	11
(Dominican Republic) Diana de Jesús	00
(Azerbaijan) Buyankhishig Purevsuren	00
(Russia) Natalia Kuziutina	12
(Spain) Estrella Lopez	00
(Israel) Ariel Bezalel	02
(Germany) Nieke Nordmeyer	00
(Brazil) Sarah Menezes	10
(Hungary) Katinka Szabó	02
(Norway) Madelene Rubinstein	01

Second round
(Romania) Alexandra-Larisa Florian	10
(Mongolia) Bishreltiin Khorloodoi	00
(Russia) Natalia Kuziutina	11
(Israel) Ariel Bezalel	00
(Japan) Ai Shishime	10
(Brazil) Sarah Menezes	00
(Hungary) Katinka Szabó	10
(Mexico) Luz Olvera	00

Third round
(Romania) Alexandra-Larisa Florian	00
(Russia) Natalia Kuziutina	11
(Japan) Ai Shishime	11
(Hungary) Katinka Szabó	00

Quarterfinals
(Russia) Natalia Kuziutina	00
(Japan) Ai Shishime	01

=== Pool C ===
First round
(Mozambique) Jacira Ferreira	00
(Australia) Tinka Easton	01
(Algeria) Meriem Moussa	10
(Mauritius) Christianne Legentil	00
(United States) Angelica Delgado	10
(Ivory Coast) Salimata Fofana	00
(Portugal) Leandra Freitas	10
(New Zealand) Justine Bishop	00
(Armenia) Sose Balasanyan	00
(Japan) Natsumi Tsunoda	11

Second round
(Brazil) Érika Miranda	10
(Australia) Tinka Easton	01
(Poland) Agata Perenc	10
(Algeria) Meriem Moussa	00
(Canada) Ecaterina Guica	00
(United States) Angelica Delgado	10
(Portugal) Leandra Freitas	00
(Japan) Natsumi Tsunoda	10

Third round
(Brazil) Érika Miranda	10
(Poland) Agata Perenc	00
(United States) Angelica Delgado	00
(Japan) Natsumi Tsunoda	11

Quarterfinals
(Brazil) Érika Miranda	00
(Japan) Natsumi Tsunoda	10

=== Pool D ===
First round
(Croatia) Tena Šikić	10
(Angola) Andreza Antonio	00
(North Korea) Rim Song-sim	00
(Hungary) Réka Pupp	01
(Morocco) Ikram Soukate	00
(Azerbaijan) Nazakat Azizova	11
(Mongolia) Azzaya Chintogtokh	00
(Russia) Yulia Kazarina	10
(India) Kalpana Devi	10
(Cape Verde) Djamila Silva	00

Second round
(Israel) Gili Cohen	11
(Croatia) Tena Šikić	00
(Hungary) Réka Pupp	00
(Belgium) Charline Van Snick	10
(Kosovo) Distria Krasniqi	10
(Azerbaijan) Nazakat Azizova	00
(Russia) Yulia Kazarina	10
(India) Kalpana Devi	00

Third round
(Israel) Gili Cohen	01
(Belgium) Charline Van Snick	00
(Kosovo) Distria Krasniqi	11
(Russia) Yulia Kazarina	00

Quarterfinals
(Israel) Gili Cohen	01
(Kosovo) Distria Krasniqi	00

== Prize money ==
The sums listed bring the total prizes awarded to 57,000$ for the individual event.

Medal	Total	Judoka	Coach
Gold	26,000$	20,800$	5,200$
Silver	15,000$	12,000$	3,000$
Bronze	8,000$	6,400$	1,600$
