= 2017 European Judo Championships – Women's team =

Judo Women's team at the 2017 European Judo Championships
- Venue: Torwar Hall
- Location: Warsaw, Poland
- Date: April 23, 2017
- Competitors: 49 from 7 nations

Medalists
gold medal	France (21st title)
silver medal	Poland
bronze medal	Croatia
bronze medal	Germany

Competition at external databases
- Links: IJF • JudoInside

The women's team competition at the 2017 European Judo Championships in Warsaw was held on 23 April at the Torwar Hall.

Each team consisted of five judokas from the –52, 57, 63, 70 and +70 kg categories.

== Teams ==
Croatia	France	Germany	Netherlands
52 kg: Tena Sikić; 57 kg: Tihea Topolovec; 63 kg: Marijana Miskovic Hasanbegovic; 70 kg: Maja Blagojević; Barbara Matić +70 kg: Ivana Maranić; Ivana Sutalo	52 kg: Melanie Clement; Amandine Buchard; 57 kg: Helene Receveaux; 63 kg: Margaux Pinot; 70 kg: Marie-Eve Gahié +70 kg: Sama Hawa Camara; Émilie Andéol	52 kg: Amandine Buchard; Nieke Nordmeyer; 57 kg: Sappho Coban; Theresa Stoll; 63 kg: Martyna Trajdos; Nadja Bazynski; 70 kg: Giovanna Scoccimarro +70 kg: Carolin Weiss; Anna-Maria Wagner	52 kg: Julie Kemmink; 57 kg: Margriet Bergstra; 63 kg: Sanne Vermeer; 70 kg: Sanne Van Dijke +70 kg: Guusje Steenhuis; Tessie Savelkouls
Poland	Russia	Turkey	
52 kg: Karolina Pieńkowska; 57 kg: Anna Borowska; Julia Kowalczyk; 63 kg: Agata Ozdoba; Karolina Tałach; 70 kg: Katarzyna Kłys; Sandra Lickun +70 kg: Beata Pacut; Anna Załęczna	52 kg: Natalia Kuziutina; 57 kg: Natalia Golomidova; Daria Mezhetckaia; 63 kg: Daria Davydova; 70 kg: Valentina Maltseva; Alena Prokopenko +70 kg: Ksenia Chibisova	52 kg: Gulkader Senturk; 57 kg: Irem Korkmaz; 63 kg: Nazlican Ozerler; 70 kg: Busra Katipoglu +70 kg: Sukran Bakacak	

== Results ==
Quarterfinals		Semifinals		Final
		Poland	3
Germany	5	Germany	2
Croatia	0			Poland	0
Russia	4			France	5
Turkey	1	Russia	2
France	3	France	3
Netherlands	2

=== Repechage ===
Repechage	Third place
	Croatia	4
	Russia	1

Repechage		Third place
Turkey	0
Netherlands	5	Netherlands	2
		Germany	3
