= 2016 European Judo Championships – Women's 52 kg =

Judo Women's 52 kg at the 2016 European Judo Championships
- Venue: TatNeft Arena
- Location: Kazan, Russia
- Date: 21 April
- Competitors: 28 from 19 nations

Medalists
| gold medal | Majlinda Kelmendi (2nd title) | Kosovo |
| silver medal | Priscilla Gneto | France |
| bronze medal | Yulia Kazarina | Russia |
| bronze medal | Andreea Chițu | Romania |

Competition at external databases
- Links: IJF • JudoInside

The women's 52 kg competition at the 2016 European Judo Championships was held on 21 April at the TatNeft Arena in Kazan, Russia.

== Results ==
=== Finals ===
Semi-finals
Andreea Chițu (ROU) | 00
Priscilla Gneto (FRA) | 10
Majlinda Kelmendi (KOS) | 00
Annabelle Euranie (FRA) | 00

Final
Priscilla Gneto (FRA) | 00
Majlinda Kelmendi (KOS) | 10

=== Repechage ===
Repechage
Yulia Kazarina (RUS) | 10
Jaana Sundberg (FIN) | 00

Third place
Yulia Kazarina (RUS) | 00
Annabelle Euranie (FRA) | 00

Repechage
Roni Schwartz (ISR) | 00
Evelyne Tschopp (SUI) | 00

Third place
Evelyne Tschopp (SUI) | 00
Andreea Chițu (ROU) | 10

=== Pool A ===
First round
Laura Gómez (ESP) | 11
Distria Krasniqi (KOS) | 00
Gili Cohen (ISR) | 00
Yulia Kazarina (RUS) | 00
Mariam Janashvili (GEO) | 00
Katinka Szabó (HUN) | 00

Round of 16
Andreea Chițu (ROU) | 10
Laura Gómez (ESP) | 00
Yulia Kazarina (RUS) | 10
Katinka Szabó (HUN) | 00

Quarterfinals
Andreea Chițu (ROU) | 00
Yulia Kazarina (RUS) | 00

=== Pool B ===
First round
Jaana Sundberg (FIN) | 00
Ilse Heylen (BEL) | 00
Priscilla Gneto (FRA) | 10
Agata Perenc (POL) | 00
Mariia Buiok (UKR) | 00
Darya Skrypnik (BLR) | 00

Round of 16
Mareen Kräh (GER) | 00
Jaana Sundberg (FIN) | 10
Priscilla Gneto (FRA) | 11
Darya Skrypnik (BLR) | 00

Quarterfinals
Jaana Sundberg (FIN) | 00
Priscilla Gneto (FRA) | 00

=== Pool C ===
First round
Oleksandra Starkova (UKR) | 10
Tihea Topolovec (CRO) | 00
Joana Ramos (POR) | 01
Katri Kakko (FIN) | 00
Roni Schwartz (ISR) | 01
Maria Tretter (GER) | 00

Round of 16
Majlinda Kelmendi (KOS) | 10
Oleksandra Starkova (UKR) | 00
Joana Ramos (POR) | 00
Roni Schwartz (ISR) | 00

Quarterfinals
Majlinda Kelmendi (KOS) | 00
Roni Schwartz (ISR) | 00

=== Pool D ===
First round
Lizaveta Rassanava (BLR) | 00
Karolina Pieńkowska (POL) | 10
Odette Giuffrida (ITA) | 00
Zhanna Stankevich (ARM) | 00
Alexandra-Larisa Florian (ROU) | 01
Evelyne Tschopp (SUI) | 10

Round of 16
Annabelle Euranie (FRA) | 10
Karolina Pieńkowska (POL) | 00
Odette Giuffrida (ITA) | 00
Evelyne Tschopp (SUI) | 00

Quarterfinals
Annabelle Euranie (FRA) | 11
Evelyne Tschopp (SUI) | 00
