= Judo at the 2019 European Games – Women's 52 kg =

Judo competition

Judo Women's 52 kg at the 2019 European Games
- Venue: Čyžoŭka-Arena
- Location: Minsk, Belarus
- Date: 22 June
- Competitors: 27 from 19 nations

Medalists
gold medal	Majlinda Kelmendi (4th title)	Kosovo
silver medal	Natalia Kuziutina	Russia
bronze medal	Chelsie Giles	Great Britain
bronze medal	Amandine Buchard	France

Competition at external databases
- Links: IJF • JudoInside

The women's 52 kg judo event at the 2019 European Games in Minsk was held on 22 June at the Čyžoŭka-Arena.

== Results ==
=== Final ===
Final
Majlinda Kelmendi (KOS)	01
Natalia Kuziutina (RUS)	00

=== Repechage ===
Repechage
Chelsie Giles (GBR)	10
Karolina Pieńkowska (POL)	00

Third place
Chelsie Giles (GBR)	10
Agata Perenc (POL)	01

Repechage
Gultaj Mammadaliyeva (AZE)	00
Odette Giuffrida (ITA)	10

Third place
Odette Giuffrida (ITA)	00
Amandine Buchard (FRA)	01

=== Top half ===
Round of 32
Arbresha Rexhepi (MKD)	00
Kseniya Danilovich (BLR)	11
Astride Gneto (FRA)	10
Amber Ryheul (BEL)	00
Joana Ramos (POR)	00
Chelsie Giles (GBR)	01
Fabienne Kocher (SUI)	10
Réka Pupp (HUN)	00
Alexandra Larisa Florian (AZE)	01
Karolina Pieńkowska (POL)	10

Round of 16
Amandine Buchard (FRA)	10
Kseniya Danilovich (BLR)	00
Astride Gneto (FRA)	01
Chelsie Giles (GBR)	10
Majlinda Kelmendi (KOS)	10
Fabienne Kocher (SUI)	00
Ana Pérez (ESP)	00
Karolina Pieńkowska (POL)	01

Quarterfinals
Amandine Buchard (FRA)	01
Chelsie Giles (GBR)	00
Majlinda Kelmendi (KOS)	10
Karolina Pieńkowska (POL)	00

Semifinals
Amandine Buchard (FRA)	00
Majlinda Kelmendi (KOS)	01

=== Bottom half ===
Round of 32
Gultaj Mammadaliyeva (AZE)	01
Katri Kakko (FIN)	00
Agata Perenc (POL)	01
Estrella López (ESP)	00
Katinka Szabó (HUN)	10
Madelene Rubinstein (NOR)	00
Anja Štangar (SLO)	10
Alesia Mlechko (BLR)	01
Odette Giuffrida (ITA)	10
Mariana Esteves (POR)	00
Andreea Chițu (ROU)	11
İrem Korkmaz (TUR)	01

Round of 16
Charline Van Snick (BEL)	00
Gultaj Mammadaliyeva (AZE)	10
Agata Perenc (POL)	01
Katinka Szabó (HUN)	00
Natalia Kuziutina (RUS)	11
Anja Štangar (SLO)	00
Odette Giuffrida (ITA)	01
Andreea Chițu (ROU)	00

Quarterfinals
Gultaj Mammadaliyeva (AZE)	00
Agata Perenc (POL)	10
Natalia Kuziutina (RUS)	01
Odette Giuffrida (ITA)	00

Semifinals
Agata Perenc (POL)	00
Natalia Kuziutina (RUS)	10
