= 2018 European Judo Championships – Women's 52 kg =

Judo competition

Judo Women's 52 kg at the 2018 European Judo Championships
- Venue: Expo Tel Aviv
- Location: Tel Aviv, Israel
- Date: 26 April

Medalists
gold medal	Natalia Kuziutina (4th title)	Russia
silver medal	Distria Krasniqi	Kosovo
bronze medal	Gefen Primo	Israel
bronze medal	Evelyne Tschopp	Switzerland

Competition at external databases
- Links: IJF • JudoInside

The women's 52 kg competition at the 2018 European Judo Championships was held on 26 April at the Expo Tel Aviv.

== Results ==
=== Finals ===
Semi-finals
Natalia Kuziutina (RUS)	10
Evelyne Tschopp (SUI)	00
İrem Korkmaz (TUR)	00
Distria Krasniqi (KOS)	10

Final
Natalia Kuziutina (RUS)	10
Distria Krasniqi (KOS)	00

=== Repechage ===
Repechage
Anja Štangar (SLO)	00
Gefen Primo (ISR)	01

Third place
Gefen Primo (ISR)	10
İrem Korkmaz (TUR)	01

Repechage
Andreea Chițu (ROU)	00
Réka Pupp (HUN)	01

Third place
Réka Pupp (HUN)	00
Evelyne Tschopp (SUI)	10

=== Pool A ===
First round
Ana Perez Box (ESP)	10
Katinka Szabó (HUN)	00
Agata Perenc (POL)	00
Joana Ramos (POR)	01

Round of 16
Natalia Kuziutina (RUS)	10
Ana Perez Box (ESP)	00
Anja Štangar (SLO)	10
Joana Ramos (POR)	00

Quarterfinals
Natalia Kuziutina (RUS)	10
Anja Štangar (SLO)	00

=== Pool B ===
First round
Sofia Asvesta (CYP)	00
Gefen Primo (ISR)	11
Buyankhishig Purevsuren (AZE)	00
Madelene Rubinstein (NOR)	01

Round of 16
Charline Van Snick (BEL)	00
Gefen Primo (ISR)	10
Evelyne Tschopp (SUI)	01
Madelene Rubinstein (NOR)	00

Quarterfinals
Gefen Primo (ISR)	00
Evelyne Tschopp (SUI)	10

=== Pool C ===
First round
Andreea Chițu (ROU)	10
Lyudmila Afendikova (UKR)	00
Gultaj Mammadaliyeva (AZE)	00
İrem Korkmaz (TUR)	01

Round of 16
Amandine Buchard (FRA)
Andreea Chițu (ROU)	10
Betina Temelkova (ISR)	00
İrem Korkmaz (TUR)	10

Quarterfinals
Andreea Chițu (ROU)	00
İrem Korkmaz (TUR)	01

=== Pool D ===
First round
Darya Skrypnik (BLR)	00
Karolina Pieńkowska (POL)	01
Mariana Esteves (POR)	00
Rosalba Forciniti (ITA)	01

Round of 16
Distria Krasniqi (KOS)	10
Karolina Pieńkowska (POL)	00
Réka Pupp (HUN)	10
Rosalba Forciniti (ITA)	00

Quarterfinals
Distria Krasniqi (KOS)	11
Réka Pupp (HUN)	00
