= Uta Abe =

Japanese judoka (born 2000)

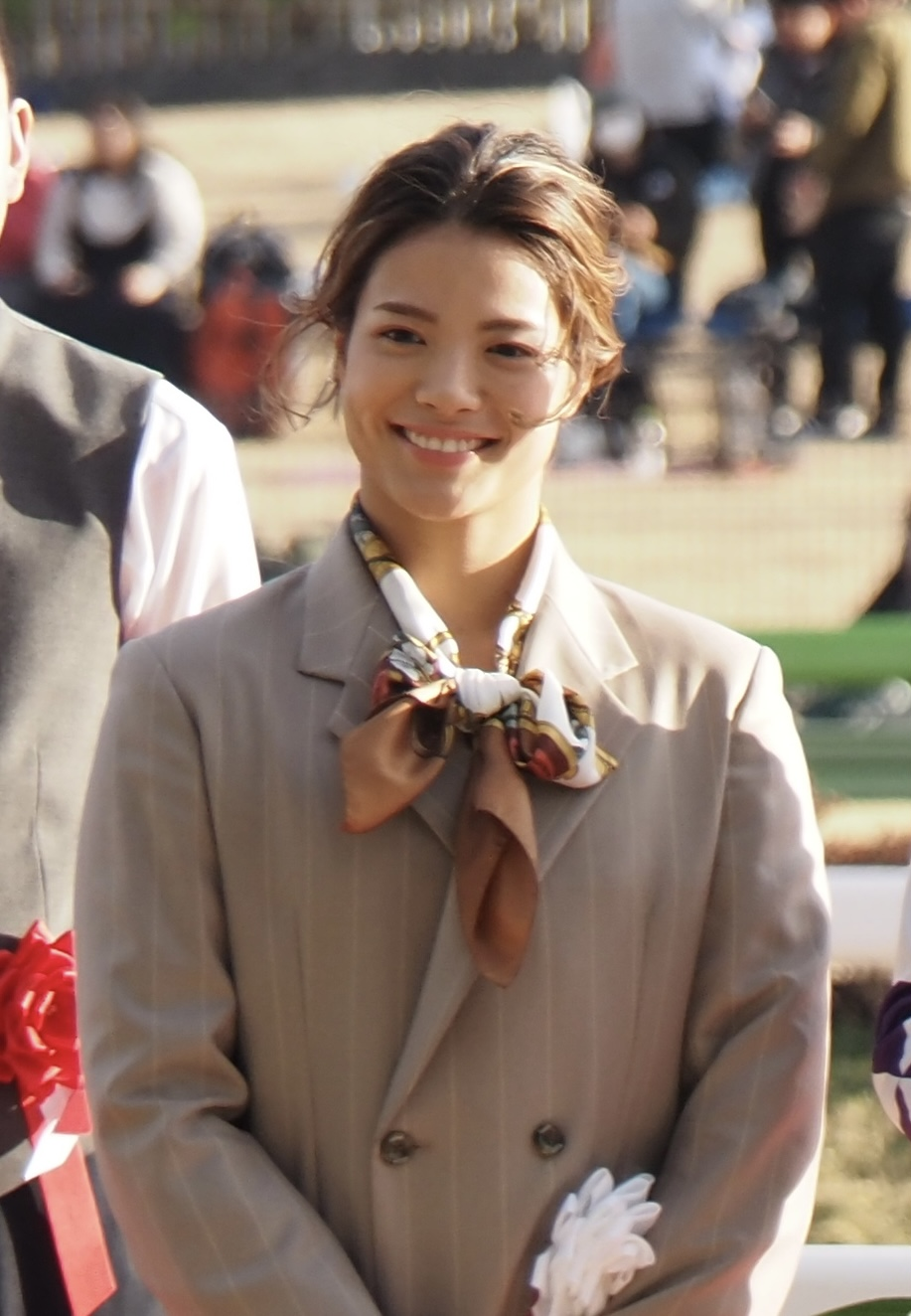
- Abe in February 2024

Personal information
- Native name: 阿部 詩
- Born: 14 July 2000 (age 26) Kobe, Hyogo Prefecture, Japan
- Occupation: Judoka
- Height: 158 cm (5 ft 2 in)

Sport
- Country: Japan
- Sport: Judo
- Weight class: ‍–‍52 kg
- Rank: 3rd dan black belt
- Club: Nippon Sport Science University
- Team: All-Japan National Team

Achievements and titles
- Olympic Games: (gold) (2020)
- World Champ.: (gold) (2018, 2019, 2022, 2023, 2025, 2026)
Medal record
Women's judo
Representing Japan
Olympic Games
Gold medal – first place	2020 Tokyo	‍–‍52 kg
Silver medal – second place	2020 Tokyo	Mixed team
Silver medal – second place	2024 Paris	Mixed team
World Championships
Gold medal – first place	2018 Baku	‍–‍52 kg
Gold medal – first place	2019 Tokyo	‍–‍52 kg
Gold medal – first place	2022 Tashkent	‍–‍52 kg
Gold medal – first place	2023 Doha	‍–‍52 kg
Gold medal – first place	2025 Budapest	‍–‍52 kg
Gold medal – first place	2026 Baku	‍–‍52 kg
IJF Grand Slam
Gold medal – first place	2017 Tokyo	‍–‍52 kg
Gold medal – first place	2018 Paris	‍–‍52 kg
Gold medal – first place	2018 Osaka	‍–‍52 kg
Gold medal – first place	2020 Düsseldorf	‍–‍52 kg
Gold medal – first place	2021 Tashkent	‍–‍52 kg
Gold medal – first place	2021 Kazan	‍–‍52 kg
Gold medal – first place	2022 Tokyo	‍–‍52 kg
Gold medal – first place	2023 Tokyo	‍–‍52 kg
Gold medal – first place	2024 Antalya	‍–‍52 kg
Gold medal – first place	2025 Baku	‍–‍52 kg
Gold medal – first place	2025 Tokyo	‍–‍52 kg
Gold medal – first place	2026 Ulaanbaatar	‍–‍52 kg
Silver medal – second place	2016 Tokyo	‍–‍52 kg
Silver medal – second place	2019 Osaka	‍–‍52 kg
IJF Grand Prix
Gold medal – first place	2017 Düsseldorf	‍–‍52 kg
Gold medal – first place	2018 Hohhot	‍–‍52 kg
Gold medal – first place	2019 Hohhot	‍–‍52 kg
Gold medal – first place	2022 Zagreb	‍–‍52 kg
World Juniors Championships
Gold medal – first place	2017 Zagreb	‍–‍52 kg

Profile at external databases
- IJF: 35696
- JudoInside.com: 97066
- Updated on 6 October 2026

Uta Abe (阿部 詩, Abe Uta; born 14 July 2000) is a Japanese judoka who competes in the Women's half-lightweight (52 kg) division. She won the gold medal in the Women's 52 kg competition at the 2020 Summer Olympics and two silver medals in a row with the Japanese team in the judo mixed team events at the 2020 and 2024 Summer Olympics. Abe is also a six-time world champion, having won the gold medal in her weight category at the World Judo Championships in 2018, 2019, 2022, 2023, 2025, and 2026.

She rose to prominence after winning her first senior gold medal, aged just 16, at the 2017 Judo Grand Prix Düsseldorf, thus becoming the youngest IJF senior competition winner in history.

== Personal life ==
Abe is the younger sister of another stellar judoka, Hifumi Abe, who competes in the Men's 66 kg division. He's a double Olympic champion, having won two consecutive gold medals in his weight category at the Summer Olympics (2020 and 2024), as well as a five-time world champion.

== Judo career ==
Abe became the youngest ever Judoka to win an IJF (International Judo Federation) Grand Prix, when she captured first place at the Düsseldorf Grand Prix in February 2017.

Abe participated at the 2018 World Championships in Baku, Azerbaijan and won her first world title at 18 years of age, making her the third-youngest Judoka to ever capture a senior World title. Abe firstly defeated Polish judoka Karolina Pieńkowska and Fabienne Kocher of Switzerland. She then defeated Jéssica Pereira of Brazil and in the semi-finals defeated Amandine Buchard of France in under 40 seconds, by armlock to make her way into the finals. In the finals, Abe was matched with teammate and former-world champion Ai Shishime, and defeated Shishime with a spectacular uchi-mata in golden score for ippon.

In 2021, Abe won the gold medal at the Tokyo 2020 Olympics on the same day that her brother Hifumi won the gold medal in his judo division.

Abe won the gold medal in the women's 52 kg event at the 2023 World Judo Championships held in Doha, Qatar.

She was defeated by Diyora Keldiyorova of Uzbekistan in the second round of the 2024 Paris Olympic Games. This was her first competition loss since her defeat to Amandine Buchard of France at the Osaka Grand Slam in 2019, over 4 years earlier.
