= 2021 World Judo Championships – Women's 52 kg =

Judo competition

Judo Women's 52 kg at the 2021 World Judo Championships
- Venue: László Papp Budapest Sports Arena
- Location: Budapest, Hungary
- Date: 7 June
- Competitors: 45 from 35 nations
- Total prize money: 57,000€

Medalists
gold medal	Ai Shishime (2nd title)	Japan
silver medal	Ana Perez Box	Spain
bronze medal	Fabienne Kocher	Switzerland
bronze medal	Gefen Primo	Israel

Competition at external databases
- Links: IJF • JudoInside

The Women's 52 kg competition at the 2021 World Judo Championships was held on 7 June 2021.

== Results ==
=== Finals ===
Semi-finals
(Japan) Ai Shishime	10
(Uzbekistan) Diyora Keldiyorova	00
(Spain) Ana Perez Box	01
(Switzerland) Fabienne Kocher	00

Final
(Japan) Ai Shishime	10
(Spain) Ana Perez Box	00

=== Repechage ===
Repechage
(Portugal) Joana Ramos	10
(Belgium) Amber Ryheul	00

Third place
(Portugal) Joana Ramos	00
(Switzerland) Fabienne Kocher	10

Repechage
(Mongolia) Lkhagvasürengiin Sosorbaram	00
(Israel) Gefen Primo	01

Third place
(Israel) Gefen Primo	10
(Uzbekistan) Diyora Keldiyorova	00

=== Pool A ===
First round
(Morocco) Soumiya Iraoui	10
(Romania) Andreea Chițu	0
(Hungary) Réka Pupp	01
(Poland) Agata Perenc	00
(Guinea-Bissau) Taciana Lima	00
(Serbia) Nadežda Petrović	10
(Haiti) Sabiana Anestor	00
(Mongolia) Bishreltiin Khorloodoi	10

Second round
(Japan) Ai Shishime	10
(Morocco) Soumiya Iraoui	00
Alesya Kuznetsova	00
(Hungary) Réka Pupp	10
(Switzerland) Evelyne Tschopp	10
(Serbia) Nadežda Petrović	00
(Mongolia) Bishreltiin Khorloodoi	00
(Portugal) Joana Ramos	01

Third round
(Japan) Ai Shishime	01
(Hungary) Réka Pupp	00
(Switzerland) Evelyne Tschopp	00
(Portugal) Joana Ramos	10

Quarterfinals
(Japan) Ai Shishime	01
(Portugal) Joana Ramos	00

=== Pool B ===
First round
(Azerbaijan) Gultaj Mammadaliyeva	10
(Georgia (country)) Tetiana Levytska-Shukvani	00
(Cape Verde) Djamila Silva	00
(Canada) Ecaterina Guica	10
(Uzbekistan) Diyora Keldiyorova	10
(United States) Angelica Delgado	00

Second round
(France) Astride Gneto	01
(Azerbaijan) Gultaj Mammadaliyeva	00
(Belgium) Amber Ryheul	10
(South Korea) Jeong Bok-yeong	00
(Israel) Gili Cohen	00
(Canada) Ecaterina Guica	10
(Uzbekistan) Diyora Keldiyorova	10
(Spain) Estrella López	00

Third round
(France) Astride Gneto	00
(Belgium) Amber Ryheul	10
(Canada) Ecaterina Guica	00
(Uzbekistan) Diyora Keldiyorova	10

Quarterfinals
(Belgium) Amber Ryheul	00
(Uzbekistan) Diyora Keldiyorova	10

=== Pool C ===
First round
(Mongolia) Lkhagvasürengiin Sosorbaram	10
(Mozambique) Jacira Ferreira	00
(United States) Katelyn Jarrell	10
(Moldova) Cristina Blanaru	00
Anastasia Polikarpova	10
(Australia) Tinka Easton	00

Second round
(Belgium) Charline Van Snick	00
(Kazakhstan) Nursulu Yeraliyeva	10
(Mongolia) Lkhagvasürengiin Sosorbaram	01
(Georgia (country)) Mariam Janashvili	00
(Spain) Ana Perez Box	10
(United States) Katelyn Jarrell	00
(Poland) Aleksandra Kaleta	00
Anastasia Polikarpova	10

Third round
(Kazakhstan) Nursulu Yeraliyeva	00
(Mongolia) Lkhagvasürengiin Sosorbaram	10
(Spain) Ana Perez Box	10
Anastasia Polikarpova	00

Quarterfinals
(Mongolia) Lkhagvasürengiin Sosorbaram	00
(Spain) Ana Perez Box	01

=== Pool D ===
First round
(Cyprus) Sofia Asvesta	00
(Switzerland) Fabienne Kocher	10
(Netherlands) Naomi van Krevel	10
(Panama) Kristine Jiménez	00
(Portugal) Joana Diogo	01
(Mexico) Luz Olvera	10

Second round
(United Kingdom) Chelsie Giles	10
(South Africa) Charne Griesel	00
(Turkey) İrem Korkmaz	00
(Switzerland) Fabienne Kocher	10
(Brazil) Larissa Pimenta	01
(Netherlands) Naomi van Krevel	00
(Mexico) Luz Olvera	00
(Israel) Gefen Primo	10

Third round
(United Kingdom) Chelsie Giles	01
(Switzerland) Fabienne Kocher	10
(Brazil) Larissa Pimenta	00
(Israel) Gefen Primo	10

Quarterfinals
(Switzerland) Fabienne Kocher	10
(Israel) Gefen Primo	00

== Prize money ==
The sums listed bring the total prizes awarded to €57,000 for the individual event.

Medal	Total	Judoka	Coach
Gold	€26,000	€20,800	€5,200
Silver	€15,000	€12,000	€3,000
Bronze	€8,000	€6,400	€1,600
