= Gefen Primo =

Israeli judoka (born 2000)

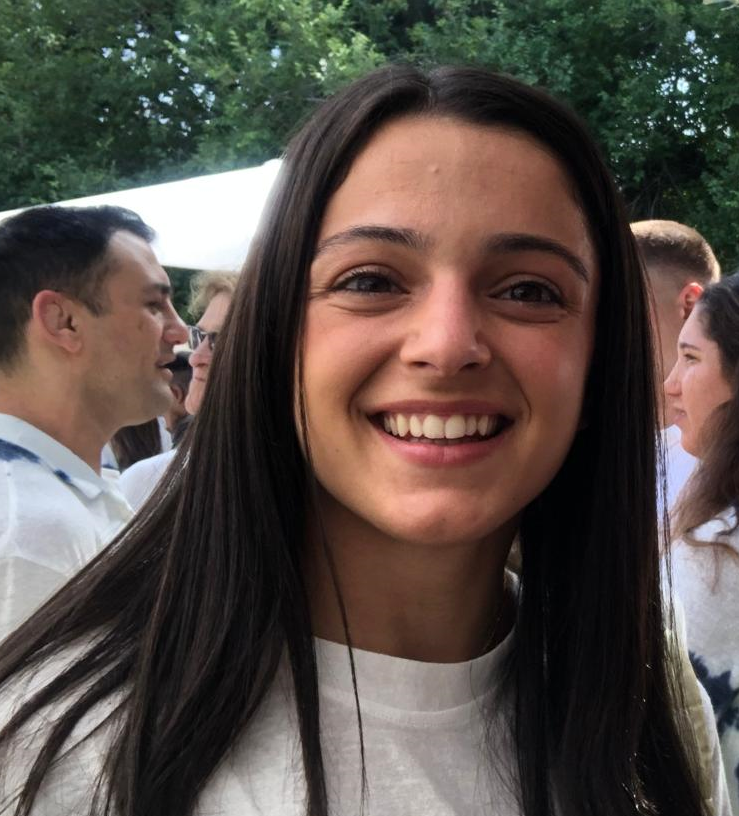
- Primo in 2017

Personal information
- Native name: גפן פרימו
- Born: 26 March 2000 (age 26) Gan HaShomron, Israel
- Occupation: Judoka
- Spouse: Eden Shamir (m. 2026)

Sport
- Country: Israel
- Sport: Judo
- Weight class: ‍–‍52 kg
- Rank: 4th dan black belt

Achievements and titles
- Olympic Games: 7th (2024)
- World Champ.: (bronze) (2021)
- European Champ.: (bronze) (2018, 2021)
- Highest world ranking: 5^{th}
Medal record
Women's judo
Representing Israel
World Championships
Bronze medal – third place	2021 Budapest	‍–‍52 kg
Bronze medal – third place	2022 Tashkent	Mixed team
European Championships
Bronze medal – third place	2018 Tel Aviv	‍–‍52 kg
Bronze medal – third place	2021 Lisbon	‍–‍52 kg
World Masters
Bronze medal – third place	2023 Budapest	‍–‍52 kg
IJF Grand Slam
Gold medal – first place	2021 Paris	‍–‍52 kg
Gold medal – first place	2023 Ulaanbaatar	‍–‍52 kg
Gold medal – first place	2024 Astana	‍–‍52 kg
Gold medal – first place	2026 Lausanne	‍–‍52 kg
Silver medal – second place	2025 Tbilisi	‍–‍52 kg
Bronze medal – third place	2019 Baku	‍–‍52 kg
Bronze medal – third place	2021 Abu Dhabi	‍–‍52 kg
Bronze medal – third place	2022 Budapest	‍–‍52 kg
Bronze medal – third place	2022 Abu Dhabi	‍–‍52 kg
Bronze medal – third place	2023 Paris	‍–‍52 kg
Bronze medal – third place	2023 Tokyo	‍–‍52 kg
Bronze medal – third place	2026 Tbilisi	‍–‍52 kg
Bronze medal – third place	2026 Abu Dhabi	‍–‍52 kg
IJF Grand Prix
Gold medal – first place	2019 Montreal	‍–‍52 kg
Bronze medal – third place	2018 Agadir	‍–‍52 kg
Bronze medal – third place	2019 Marrakesh	‍–‍52 kg
Bronze medal – third place	2019 Hohhot	‍–‍52 kg
Bronze medal – third place	2019 Tashkent	‍–‍52 kg
Bronze medal – third place	2022 Zagreb	‍–‍52 kg
Bronze medal – third place	2025 Guadalajara	‍–‍52 kg
World Juniors Championships
Silver medal – second place	2018 Nassau	‍–‍52 kg
European Junior Championships
Bronze medal – third place	2017 Maribor	‍–‍52 kg
European Cadet Championships
Silver medal – second place	2017 Kaunas	‍–‍52 kg
European Youth Olympic Festival
Gold medal – first place	2017 Győr	‍–‍52 kg

Profile at external databases
- IJF: 20206
- JudoInside.com: 95367
- Updated on 29 October 2026

Gefen Primo (Hebrew: גפן פרימו; born 26 March 2000) is an Israeli judoka. She competes in the under 52 kg weight category. She won a gold medal at the 2017 European Youth Summer Olympic Festival. She won individual bronze medals in the 2018 European Championships, 2021 World Championships and 2021 European Championships as well as a team bronze at the 2022 World Championships. Primo represented Israel at the 2024 Summer Olympics in judo in the women's 52 kg, in which she came in seventh, and in the mixed team event, in which Team Israel came in ninth.

== Early life ==
Primo was born in moshav Gan HaShomron, Israel, and is Jewish. Her mother Meirav Primo is a board member of the Israel Judo Association since 2016. Her younger brother Einav Primo and her younger sister Kerem Primo are both judoka as well; Kerem won the silver medal in the 2021 Junior World Championships, gold medals in the 2021 Junior European and Cadet European championships, and the 2022 European Youth Olympics Championship. As of 2015, she moved with her family to moshav Kfar Netter, Israel, to be closer to the judo trainings at the Wingate Institute in the city of Netanya, Israel.

She was enlisted as a soldier in the Israeli Air Force in 2019, which designated her to an excellent sportsperson status.

== Judo career ==
=== 2015–17; European Youth Olympic Champion ===
Primo won the gold medal in the 2015 Israeli U18 Championships in Ra'anana.

At the 2016 European Cup U21 Athens she won a bronze medal. Primo won gold medals in the 2016 European Cup Cadets Coimbra, 2016 European Cup Cadets Zagreb, and 2016 European Cup Cadets Antalya. She won the gold medal in the 2016 Israeli U21 Championships in Ra'anana.

Primo won the gold medal at the 2017 European Youth Summer Olympic Festival in Hungary, won the silver medal at the 2017 European Cadet Championships in Kaunas, and a bronze medal in the 2017 European Junior Championships in Maribor, Slovenia. She won the gold medal in the 2017 European Cup Cadets in Coimbra. She won the silver medal in the 2017 European Cup U21 Athens. She won a bronze medal in the 2017 Israeli Championships in Ra'anana.

=== 2018–20; World junior championships silver medal ===
On 3 February 2018, Primo competed at her first international senior competition at the 'Odivelas European Open' in Portugal and won a bronze medal. On 9 March, she won her first IJF World Tour medal when she won a bronze medal at the 2018 Agadir Grand Prix.

On 26 April, Primo won a bronze medal in the 2018 European Championships in Tel Aviv in the under 52 kg weight category, becoming the youngest Israeli judoka to win a European championships medal. In the first round she defeated Sofia Asvesta of Cyprus by waza-ari and ippon, in the second round she defeated Charline Van Snick of Belgium by ippon. In the quarter-finals she lost to Evelyne Tschopp of Switzerland. She went on to defeat Anja Štangar of Slovenia in the repechage and reached the bronze medal match where she defeated İrem Korkmaz of Turkey by two waza-ari after her opponent scored one. At 18 years of age, she became the youngest Israeli judoka (among both women and men) to earn a place on a podium at a senior European Championship.

On 18 October, Primo won the silver medal at the 2018 World Juniors Championships in Nassau.

Primo won the gold medal in the 2019 Montreal Grand Prix, and bronze medals in 2019 Marrakesh Grand Prix, 2019 Baku Grand Slam, 2019 Hohhot Grand Prix, and 2019 Tashkent Grand Prix. She won the gold medal in the 2019 Israeli Championships in Tel Aviv.

=== 2021–present; World championships bronze medal ===
At the 2021 World Championships in Budapest, Primo won a bronze medal. At the 2021 European Championships she also won a bronze medal. She won the gold medal at the 2021 Paris Grand Slam. At the 2021 Abu Dhabi Grand Slam held in the United Arab Emirates, she won one of the bronze medals in her event.

Primo won bronze medals at 2022 Budapest Grand Slam, 2022 Zagreb Grand Prix and 2022 Abu Dhabi Grand Slam, as well as in the mixed teams event at the 2022 World Championships.

Primo won a gold medal at the 2023 Ulaanbaatar Grand Slam in Mongolia, and bronze medals at 2023 Paris Grand Slam, 2023 Tokyo Grand Slam, and 2023 World Masters in Budapest. Primo won the gold medal in the 2023 Israeli Championships in Eilat.

Primo won the gold medal at 2024 Astana Grand Slam in the ‍–‍52 kg category in Kazakhstan.

=== 2024 Paris Olympics ===
Primo represented Israel at the 2024 Summer Olympics in judo in the women's 52 kg, in which she came in seventh, after losing in the quarter-finals to Kosovo's Distria Krasniqi, a reigning Olympic champion. She also represented Israel in the mixed team event, in which Team Israel came in ninth.

== Personal life ==
On 27 June 2025 Primo got engaged to footballer Eden Shamir. The couple got married on 15 January 2026.

== Titles ==
Year	Tournament	Place	Ref.
2018	Grand Prix Agadir	3rd place, bronze medalist(s)	
2018	European Championships	3rd place, bronze medalist(s)	
2019	Grand Prix Marrakesh	3rd place, bronze medalist(s)	
2019	Grand Slam Baku	3rd place, bronze medalist(s)	
2019	Grand Prix Hohhot	3rd place, bronze medalist(s)	
2019	Grand Prix Montreal	1st place, gold medalist(s)	
2019	Grand Prix Tashkent	3rd place, bronze medalist(s)	
2021	European Championships	3rd place, bronze medalist(s)	
2021	World Championships	3rd place, bronze medalist(s)	
2021	Grand Slam Paris	1st place, gold medalist(s)	
2021	Grand Slam Abu Dhabi	3rd place, bronze medalist(s)	
2022	Grand Slam Budapest	3rd place, bronze medalist(s)	
2022	Grand Prix Zagreb	3rd place, bronze medalist(s)	
2022	Grand Slam Abu Dhabi	3rd place, bronze medalist(s)	
2023	Grand Slam Paris	3rd place, bronze medalist(s)	
2023	Grand Slam Ulaanbaatar	1st place, gold medalist(s)	
2023	World Masters	3rd place, bronze medalist(s)	
2023	Grand Slam Tokyo	3rd place, bronze medalist(s)	
2024	Grand Slam Astana	1st place, gold medalist(s)	
2025	Grand Slam Tbilisi	2nd place, silver medalist(s)	
2025	Grand Prix Guadalajara	3rd place, bronze medalist(s)	
2026	Grand Slam Tbilisi	3rd place, bronze medalist(s)	

== See also ==
- List of World Judo Championships medalists
- List of select Jewish judokas
- Israel Judo Association
- Israel national judo team
