= 2018 Judo Grand Prix Cancún =

Judo competition

Judo 2018 Judo Grand Prix Cancún
- Venue: Polifórum Benito Juárez
- Location: Cancún, Mexico
- Dates: 12–14 October 2018
- Competitors: 321 from 46 nations

Competition at external databases
- Links: IJF • EJU • JudoInside

The 2018 Judo Grand Prix Cancún was held in Cancún, Mexico, from 12 to 14 October 2018.

== Medal summary ==
=== Men's events ===
Event	Gold	Silver	Bronze
Extra-lightweight (−60 kg)	Tornike Tsjakadoea (NED)	Luka Mkheidze (FRA)	Lenin Preciado (ECU)
Extra-lightweight (−60 kg)	Tornike Tsjakadoea (NED)	Luka Mkheidze (FRA)	David Pulkrábek (CZE)
Half-lightweight (−66 kg)	Aram Grigoryan (RUS)	Mikhail Pulyaev (RUS)	Charles Chibana (BRA)
Half-lightweight (−66 kg)	Aram Grigoryan (RUS)	Mikhail Pulyaev (RUS)	Elios Manzi (ITA)
Lightweight (−73 kg)	Tommy Macias (SWE)	Denis Iartsev (RUS)	Arthur Margelidon (CAN)
Lightweight (−73 kg)	Tommy Macias (SWE)	Denis Iartsev (RUS)	Marcelo Contini (BRA)
Half-middleweight (−81 kg)	Sami Chouchi (BEL)	Victor Penalber (BRA)	Frank de Wit (NED)
Half-middleweight (−81 kg)	Sami Chouchi (BEL)	Victor Penalber (BRA)	Tim Gramkow (GER)
Middleweight (−90 kg)	Iván Felipe Silva Morales (CUB)	Marc Odenthal (GER)	Rafael Macedo (BRA)
Middleweight (−90 kg)	Iván Felipe Silva Morales (CUB)	Marc Odenthal (GER)	Nacif Elias (LIB)
Half-heavyweight (−100 kg)	Niyaz Bilalov (RUS)	Laurin Boehler (AUT)	Aaron Fara (AUT)
Half-heavyweight (−100 kg)	Niyaz Bilalov (RUS)	Laurin Boehler (AUT)	Rafael Buzacarini (BRA)
Heavyweight (+100 kg)	Lukáš Krpálek (CZE)	Andy Granda (CUB)	Tamerlan Bashaev (RUS)
Heavyweight (+100 kg)	Lukáš Krpálek (CZE)	Andy Granda (CUB)	Daniel Allerstorfer (AUT)

=== Women's events ===
Event	Gold	Silver	Bronze
Extra-lightweight (−48 kg)	Paula Pareto (ARG)	Catarina Costa (POR)	Milica Nikolić (SRB)
Extra-lightweight (−48 kg)	Paula Pareto (ARG)	Catarina Costa (POR)	Julia Figueroa (ESP)
Half-lightweight (−52 kg)	Ana Pérez Box (ESP)	Agata Perenc (POL)	Evelyne Tschopp (SUI)
Half-lightweight (−52 kg)	Ana Pérez Box (ESP)	Agata Perenc (POL)	Joana Ramos (POR)
Lightweight (−57 kg)	Rafaela Silva (BRA)	Jessica Klimkait (CAN)	Timna Nelson-Levy (ISR)
Lightweight (−57 kg)	Rafaela Silva (BRA)	Jessica Klimkait (CAN)	Miryam Roper (PAN)
Half-middleweight (−63 kg)	Magdalena Krssakova (AUT)	Catherine Beauchemin-Pinard (CAN)	Amy Livesey (GBR)
Half-middleweight (−63 kg)	Magdalena Krssakova (AUT)	Catherine Beauchemin-Pinard (CAN)	Alexia Castilhos (BRA)
Middleweight (−70 kg)	Michaela Polleres (AUT)	Gabriella Willems (BEL)	Kelita Zupancic (CAN)
Middleweight (−70 kg)	Michaela Polleres (AUT)	Gabriella Willems (BEL)	Daria Pogorzelec (POL)
Half-heavyweight (−78 kg)	Rika Takayama (JPN)	Mayra Aguiar (BRA)	Kaliema Antomarchi (CUB)
Half-heavyweight (−78 kg)	Rika Takayama (JPN)	Mayra Aguiar (BRA)	Samanta Soares (BRA)
Heavyweight (+78 kg)	Idalys Ortiz (CUB)	Maria Suelen Altheman (BRA)	Beatriz Souza (BRA)
Heavyweight (+78 kg)	Idalys Ortiz (CUB)	Maria Suelen Altheman (BRA)	Ksenia Chibisova (RUS)

Source Results

=== Medal table ===
* Host nation (Mexico)

Rank	Nation	Gold	Silver	Bronze	Total
1	Russia (RUS)	2	2	2	6
2	Austria (AUT)	2	1	2	5
3	Cuba (CUB)	2	1	1	4
4	Brazil (BRA)	1	3	7	11
5	Belgium (BEL)	1	1	0	2
6	Czech Republic (CZE)	1	0	1	2
6	Netherlands (NED)	1	0	1	2
6	Spain (ESP)	1	0	1	2
9	Argentina (ARG)	1	0	0	1
9	Japan (JPN)	1	0	0	1
9	Sweden (SWE)	1	0	0	1
12	Canada (CAN)	0	2	2	4
13	Germany (GER)	0	1	1	2
13	Poland (POL)	0	1	1	2
13	Portugal (POR)	0	1	1	2
16	France (FRA)	0	1	0	1
17	Ecuador (ECU)	0	0	1	1
17	Great Britain (GBR)	0	0	1	1
17	Israel (ISR)	0	0	1	1
17	Italy (ITA)	0	0	1	1
17	Lebanon (LIB)	0	0	1	1
17	Panama (PAN)	0	0	1	1
17	Serbia (SRB)	0	0	1	1
17	Switzerland (SUI)	0	0	1	1
Totals (24 entries)		14	14	28	56
