= Judo at the 2015 Pan American Games – Women's 52 kg =

Women's 52 kg at the 2015 Pan American Games
- Venue: Mississauga Sports Centre
- Dates: July 11
- Competitors: 10 from 10 nations

Medalists
Gold medal	Érika Miranda	Brazil
Silver medal	Ecaterina Guica	Canada
Bronze medal	Angelica Delgado	United States
Bronze medal	Gretter Romero	Cuba

The women's 52 kg competition of the judo events at the 2015 Pan American Games in Toronto, Canada, was held on July 11 at the Mississauga Sports Centre.

== Schedule ==
All times are Central Standard Time (UTC-6).

Date	Time	Round
July 11, 2015	15:44	Preliminary bout
July 11, 2015	15:58	Quarterfinals
July 11, 2015	16:40	Repechage
July 11, 2015	17:22	Semifinals
July 11, 2015	20:52	Bronze medal matches
July 11, 2015	21:06	Final

== Results ==
Legend

- 1st number = Ippon
- 2nd number = Waza-ari
- 3rd number = Yuko

=== Bracket ===
Preliminaries
Jormary Palma (VEN)	000
Diana Díaz (ECU)	011
Tatiana Lucumi (COL)	000
Gretter Romero (CUB)	100

Quarter Finals
Érika Miranda (BRA)	100
María García (DOM)	000
Abi Cardozo (ARG)	000S2
Diana Díaz (ECU)	001S1
Angélica Delgado (USA)	011S1
Jennifer Cruz (MEX)	000
Ecaterina Guica (CAN)	100
Gretter Romero (CUB)	000

Semi Finals
Érika Miranda (BRA)	001S1
Diana Díaz (ECU)	000
Angélica Delgado (USA)	000S1
Ecaterina Guica (CAN)	100

Final
Érika Miranda (BRA)	110
Ecaterina Guica (CAN)	000

=== Repechage round ===
Two bronze medals were awarded.

Repechage		Bronze medal
María García (DOM)	101
Abi Cardozo (ARG)	000	María García (DOM)	000S2
		Angélica Delgado (USA)	000

Repechage		Bronze medal
Jennifer Cruz (MEX)	000
Gretter Romero (CUB)	100S1	Gretter Romero (CUB)	100
		Diana Díaz (ECU)	000
