= 2017 European Judo Championships =

Judo competition

2017 Judo European Judo Championships
- Venue: Torwar Hall
- Location: Warsaw, Poland
- Dates: 20–23 April 2017
- Competitors: 369 from 41 nations
- Website: Official website

Champions
- Men's team: Georgia (9th title)
- Women's team: France (21st title)

Competition at external databases
- Links: IJF • JudoInside

The 2017 European Judo Championships were held in Warsaw, Poland from 20–23 April 2017.

== Medal overview ==
=== Men ===
Event	Gold	Silver	Bronze
−60 kg	Robert Mshvidobadze (RUS)	Yanislav Gerchev (BUL)	Orkhan Safarov (AZE) Francisco Garrigós (ESP)
−66 kg	Georgii Zantaraia (UKR)	Adrian Gomboc (SLO)	Nijat Shikhalizade (AZE) Matej Poliak (SVK)
−73 kg	Hidayat Heydarov (AZE)	Musa Mogushkov (RUS)	Rustam Orujov (AZE) Tommy Macias (SWE)
−81 kg	Alan Khubetsov (RUS)	Dominic Ressel (GER)	Aslan Lappinagov (RUS) Dominik Družeta (CRO)
−90 kg	Aleksandar Kukolj (SRB)	Axel Clerget (FRA)	Beka Gviniashvili (GEO) Khusen Khalmurzaev (RUS)
−100 kg	Elkhan Mammadov (AZE)	Cyrille Maret (FRA)	Kirill Denisov (RUS) Kazbek Zankishiev (RUS)
+100 kg	Guram Tushishvili (GEO)	Adam Okruashvili (GEO)	Lukáš Krpálek (CZE) Roy Meyer (NED)
Team	Georgia; Lasha Giunashvili; Vazha Margvelashvili; Lasha Shavdatuashvili; Phridon Gigani; Zebeda Rekhviashvili; Beka Gviniashvili; Ushangi Margiani; Guram Tushishvili; Adam Okruashvili	Russia; Anzaur Ardanov; Abdula Abdulzhalilov; Uali Kurzhev; Denis Yartsev; Denis Kalinin; Stanislav Semenov; Magomed Magomedov; Khusen Khalmurzaev; Andrey Volkov; Renat Saidov	Hungary; Ákos Bartha; Frigyes Szabó; László Csoknyai; Gábor Vér; Barna Bor; Miklós Cirjenics Ukraine; Gevorg Khachatrian; Dmytro Kanivets; Sergii Krivchach; Quedjau Nhabali; Vadym Synyavsky; Stanislav Bondarenko; Iakiv Khammo

=== Women ===
Event	Gold	Silver	Bronze
−48 kg	Daria Bilodid (UKR)	Irina Dolgova (RUS)	Monica Ungureanu (ROU) Éva Csernoviczki (HUN)
−52 kg	Majlinda Kelmendi (KOS)	Alesya Kuznetsova (RUS)	Evelyne Tschopp (SUI) Joana Ramos (POR)
−57 kg	Priscilla Gneto (FRA)	Theresa Stoll (GER)	Nora Gjakova (KOS) Hélène Receveaux (FRA)
−63 kg	Tina Trstenjak (SLO)	Margaux Pinot (FRA)	Alice Schlesinger (GBR) Kathrin Unterwurzacher (AUT)
−70 kg	Sanne Van Dijke (NED)	Giovanna Scoccimarro (GER)	Barbara Matić (CRO) Marie-Ève Gahié (FRA)
−78 kg	Audrey Tcheumeo (FRA)	Guusje Steenhuis (NED)	Abigél Joó (HUN) Natalie Powell (GBR)
+78 kg	Maryna Slutskaya (BLR)	Svitlana Iaromka (UKR)	Carolin Weiß (GER) Larisa Cerić (BIH)
Team	France; Amandine Buchard; Mélanie Clément; Priscilla Gneto; Hélène Receveaux; Margaux Pinot; Marie-Eve Gahié; Sama Hawa Camara; Émilie Andéol	Poland; Agata Perenc; Karolina Pieńkowska; Anna Borowska; Julia Kowalczyk; Agata Ozdoba; Karolina Tałach; Katarzyna Kłys; Sandra Lickun; Beata Pacut; Anna Załęczna	Croatia; Tena Šikić; Tihea Topolovec; Marijana Mišković Hasanbegović; Maja Blagojević; Barbara Matić; Ivana Maranić; Ivana Šutalo Germany; Nieke Nordmeyer; Sappho Coban; Theresa Stoll; Martyna Trajdos; Nadja Bazynski; Giovanna Scoccimarro; Carolin Weiß; Anna-Maria Wagner

=== Medal table ===
* Host nation (Poland)

Rank	Nation	Gold	Silver	Bronze	Total
1	France	3	3	2	8
2	Russia	2	4	4	10
3	Georgia	2	1	1	4
3	Ukraine	2	1	1	4
5	Azerbaijan	2	0	3	5
6	Netherlands	1	1	1	3
7	Slovenia	1	1	0	2
8	Kosovo	1	0	1	2
9	Belarus	1	0	0	1
9	Serbia	1	0	0	1
11	Germany	0	3	2	5
12	Bulgaria	0	1	0	1
12	Poland*	0	1	0	1
14	Croatia	0	0	3	3
14	Hungary	0	0	3	3
16	Great Britain	0	0	2	2
17	Austria	0	0	1	1
17	Bosnia and Herzegovina	0	0	1	1
17	Czech Republic	0	0	1	1
17	Portugal	0	0	1	1
17	Romania	0	0	1	1
17	Slovakia	0	0	1	1
17	Spain	0	0	1	1
17	Sweden	0	0	1	1
17	Switzerland	0	0	1	1
Totals (25 entries)		16	16	32	64

== Participating nations ==
There was a total of 369 participants from 41 nations.

- Albania (2)
- Armenia (5)
- Austria (11)
- Azerbaijan (11)
- Belarus (9)
- Belgium (11)
- Bosnia and Herzegovina (5)
- Bulgaria (4)
- Croatia (10)
- Cyprus (3)
- Czech Republic (5)
- Estonia (7)
- Finland (1)
- France (18)
- Georgia (12)
- Germany (18)
- Great Britain (9)
- Greece (3)
- Hungary (18)
- Israel (12)
- Italy (15)
- Kosovo (6)
- Latvia (6)
- Lithuania (12)
- Moldova (8)
- Monaco (2)
- Montenegro (7)
- Netherlands (12)
- Norway (1)
- Poland (18)
- Portugal (13)
- Romania (11)
- Russia (18)
- Serbia (9)
- Slovakia (4)
- Slovenia (8)
- Spain (8)
- Sweden (5)
- Switzerland (3)
- Turkey (15)
- Ukraine (14)
