= 2011 European Cadet Judo Championships =

Judo competition

Judo 2011 European Cadet Judo Championships
- Location: Cottonera, Malta
- Dates: 24–26 June 2011

Competition at external databases
- Links: JudoInside

The 2011 European Cadet Judo Championships is an edition of the European Cadet Judo Championships, organised by the International Judo Federation. It was held in Cottonera, Malta from 24 to 26 June 2011.

== Medal summary ==
=== Medal table ===
* Host nation (Malta)

Rank	Nation	Gold	Silver	Bronze	Total
1	Russia (RUS)	5	2	6	13
2	Georgia (GEO)	2	3	2	7
3	Ukraine (UKR)	2	1	3	6
4	Netherlands (NED)	2	0	0	2
5	Italy (ITA)	1	1	2	4
6	Great Britain (GBR)	1	1	1	3
7	Romania (ROU)	1	0	1	2
8	Bulgaria (BUL)	1	0	0	1
8	Latvia (LAT)	1	0	0	1
10	France (FRA)	0	3	2	5
11	Slovenia (SLO)	0	2	1	3
12	Azerbaijan (AZE)	0	1	4	5
13	Turkey (TUR)	0	1	3	4
14	Germany (GER)	0	1	0	1
15	Belarus (BLR)	0	0	1	1
15	Belgium (BEL)	0	0	1	1
15	Croatia (CRO)	0	0	1	1
15	Hungary (HUN)	0	0	1	1
15	Israel (ISR)	0	0	1	1
15	Poland (POL)	0	0	1	1
15	Spain (ESP)	0	0	1	1
Totals (21 entries)		16	16	32	64

=== Men's events ===
Event	Gold	Silver	Bronze
−50 kg	Elios Manzi (ITA)	Walide Khyar (FRA)	Luca Cavallo (ITA)
−50 kg	Elios Manzi (ITA)	Walide Khyar (FRA)	Louis Masy (FRA)
−55 kg	Vano Mamisashvili (GEO)	Iskandar Talishinski (AZE)	Oleksandr Yemchenko (UKR)
−55 kg	Vano Mamisashvili (GEO)	Iskandar Talishinski (AZE)	Elbrus Zamanov (AZE)
−60 kg	Eldar Gazimagomedov (RUS)	Tamazi Kirakozashvili (GEO)	Vladislav Azovtsev (RUS)
−60 kg	Eldar Gazimagomedov (RUS)	Tamazi Kirakozashvili (GEO)	Rashad Rufullayev (AZE)
−66 kg	Mikhail Igolnikov (RUS)	Ramazan Kodzhakov (RUS)	Murat Bektas (TUR)
−66 kg	Mikhail Igolnikov (RUS)	Ramazan Kodzhakov (RUS)	Huseyn Rahimli (AZE)
−73 kg	Suleiman Vyshegurov (RUS)	Rustam Gerekov (RUS)	Firudin Dadashov (AZE)
−73 kg	Suleiman Vyshegurov (RUS)	Rustam Gerekov (RUS)	Levan Gugava (GEO)
−81 kg	Beka Gviniashvili (GEO)	Bohdan Zusko (UKR)	Abdul-Malik Eldzharkiev (RUS)
−81 kg	Beka Gviniashvili (GEO)	Bohdan Zusko (UKR)	Davyd Kharebava (UKR)
−90 kg	Glebs Talalujevs (LAT)	Shalva Chocheli (GEO)	Guram Tushishvili (GEO)
−90 kg	Glebs Talalujevs (LAT)	Shalva Chocheli (GEO)	Li Kochman (ISR)
+90 kg	Oleg Abaev (RUS)	Giorgi Lazuashvili (GEO)	Aleksey Sapunov (RUS)
+90 kg	Oleg Abaev (RUS)	Giorgi Lazuashvili (GEO)	Mateusz Kwiatkowski (POL)

=== Women's events ===
Event	Gold	Silver	Bronze
−40 kg	Borislava Damyanova (BUL)	Philine Falk (GER)	Evelyne Audiens (BEL)
−40 kg	Borislava Damyanova (BUL)	Philine Falk (GER)	Ruth Barna (ROU)
−44 kg	Irina Dolgova (RUS)	Sara Maria Romano (ITA)	Nazlican Kilic (TUR)
−44 kg	Irina Dolgova (RUS)	Sara Maria Romano (ITA)	Hayley Willis (GBR)
−48 kg	Olga Smolska (UKR)	Amandine Buchard (FRA)	Natalia Golomidova (RUS)
−48 kg	Olga Smolska (UKR)	Amandine Buchard (FRA)	Anja Štangar (SLO)
−52 kg	Alexandra-Larisa Florian (ROU)	Lucy Renshall (GBR)	Zarina Babinyan (RUS)
−52 kg	Alexandra-Larisa Florian (ROU)	Lucy Renshall (GBR)	Megane Mattei (FRA)
−57 kg	Do Velema (NED)	Kevser Cevik (TUR)	Giulia Corrieri (ITA)
−57 kg	Do Velema (NED)	Kevser Cevik (TUR)	Selin Gül (TUR)
−63 kg	Katie-Jemima Yeats-Brown (GBR)	Patricija Brolih (SLO)	Maryna Heryatovich (BLR)
−63 kg	Katie-Jemima Yeats-Brown (GBR)	Patricija Brolih (SLO)	Krisztina Polyák (HUN)
−70 kg	Jenny Snippe (NED)	Aja Gacnik Zupanc (SLO)	Sara Rodriguez (ESP)
−70 kg	Jenny Snippe (NED)	Aja Gacnik Zupanc (SLO)	Brigita Matić-Ljuba (CRO)
+70 kg	Anastasiya Turchyn (UKR)	Roudelie Caroly (FRA)	Kristina Usova (RUS)
+70 kg	Anastasiya Turchyn (UKR)	Roudelie Caroly (FRA)	Yelyzaveta Kalanina (UKR)

Source Results
