= Wang Xin (judoka) =

Chinese judoka (born 1995)

Personal information
- Born: 28 August 1995 (age 30)
- Occupation: Judoka

Sport
- Country: China
- Sport: Judo
- Weight class: ‍–‍52 kg

Achievements and titles
- World Champ.: R32 (2017)
- Asian Champ.: (bronze) (2017)
Medal record
Women's judo
Representing China
Asian Championships
Bronze medal – third place	2017 Hong Kong	‍–‍52 kg
IJF Grand Prix
Bronze medal – third place	2017 Hohhot	‍–‍52 kg

Profile at external databases
- IJF: 39824
- JudoInside.com: 10306
- Updated on 7 December 2022

Wang Xin (born 28 August 1995) is a Chinese judoka.

Wang is a bronze medalist from the 2017 Judo Grand Prix Hohhot in the ‍–‍52 kg category.
