= 2010 European Junior Judo Championships =

Judo competition

Judo 2010 European Junior Judo Championships
- Location: Samokov, Bulgaria
- Dates: 17–19 September 2010

Competition at external databases
- Links: EJU • JudoInside

The 2010 European Junior Judo Championships is an edition of the European Junior Judo Championships, organised by the European Judo Union.It was held in Samokov, Bulgaria from 17 to 19 September 2010.

== Medal summary ==
=== Medal table ===
* Host nation (Bulgaria)

Rank	Nation	Gold	Silver	Bronze	Total
1	Russia (RUS)	3	3	3	9
2	Netherlands (NED)	3	1	0	4
3	Georgia (GEO)	2	1	0	3
4	France (FRA)	1	3	1	5
5	Bulgaria (BUL)*	1	1	1	3
6	Serbia (SRB)	1	1	0	2
7	Germany (GER)	1	0	5	6
8	Italy (ITA)	1	0	2	3
8	Slovenia (SLO)	1	0	2	3
10	Albania (ALB)	1	0	0	1
10	Greece (GRE)	1	0	0	1
12	Turkey (TUR)	0	1	2	3
13	Armenia (ARM)	0	1	1	2
13	Croatia (CRO)	0	1	1	2
13	Romania (ROU)	0	1	1	2
16	Austria (AUT)	0	1	0	1
16	Belarus (BLR)	0	1	0	1
18	Ukraine (UKR)	0	0	4	4
19	Great Britain (GBR)	0	0	2	2
19	Poland (POL)	0	0	2	2
21	Azerbaijan (AZE)	0	0	1	1
21	Czech Republic (CZE)	0	0	1	1
21	Estonia (EST)	0	0	1	1
21	Slovakia (SVK)	0	0	1	1
21	Switzerland (SUI)	0	0	1	1
Totals (25 entries)		16	16	32	64

=== Men's events ===
Event	Gold	Silver	Bronze
−55 kg	Otar Kaidarashvili (GEO)	Grigor Ivanyan (ARM)	Maxime Dufond (FRA)
−55 kg	Otar Kaidarashvili (GEO)	Grigor Ivanyan (ARM)	Aram Grigoryan (RUS)
−60 kg	Yakub Shamilov (RUS)	Adrien Bourguignon (FRA)	Gor Harutyunyan (ARM)
−60 kg	Yakub Shamilov (RUS)	Adrien Bourguignon (FRA)	Vugar Shirinli (AZE)
−66 kg	Georgios Azoidis (GRE)	Anzaur Ardanov (RUS)	Lewis Keeble (GBR)
−66 kg	Georgios Azoidis (GRE)	Anzaur Ardanov (RUS)	Enrico Parlati (ITA)
−73 kg	Andrea Regis (ITA)	Jonathan Allardon (FRA)	Hannes Conrad (GER)
−73 kg	Andrea Regis (ITA)	Jonathan Allardon (FRA)	Adam Gazo (SVK)
−81 kg	Avtandili Tchrikishvili (GEO)	Aleksandar Kukolj (SRB)	Albert Kostoev (RUS)
−81 kg	Avtandili Tchrikishvili (GEO)	Aleksandar Kukolj (SRB)	Max Muensterberg (GER)
−90 kg	Magomed Magomedov (RUS)	Giorgi Nozadze (GEO)	Grigori Minaškin (EST)
−90 kg	Magomed Magomedov (RUS)	Giorgi Nozadze (GEO)	Jakub Zarzeczny (POL)
−100 kg	Karl-Richard Frey (GER)	Shamil Magomedov (RUS)	Daniel Dichev (BUL)
−100 kg	Karl-Richard Frey (GER)	Shamil Magomedov (RUS)	Dmytro Luchyn (UKR)
+100 kg	Roy Meyer (NED)	Ensar Tama (TUR)	Domenico Di Guida (ITA)
+100 kg	Roy Meyer (NED)	Ensar Tama (TUR)	Sven Heinle (GER)

=== Women's events ===
Event	Gold	Silver	Bronze
−44 kg	Julijana Savic (SRB)	Diana Kovacs (ROU)	Esma Dademir (TUR)
−44 kg	Julijana Savic (SRB)	Diana Kovacs (ROU)	Kristina Vrsic (SLO)
−48 kg	Alesya Kuznetsova (RUS)	Scarlett Gabrielli (FRA)	Karolina Pieńkowska (POL)
−48 kg	Alesya Kuznetsova (RUS)	Scarlett Gabrielli (FRA)	Freya Dechastelain (GBR)
−52 kg	Majlinda Kelmendi (ALB)	Tina Zeltner (AUT)	Oleksandra Starkova (UKR)
−52 kg	Majlinda Kelmendi (ALB)	Tina Zeltner (AUT)	Tuğba Zehir (TUR)
−57 kg	Hélène Receveaux (FRA)	Ivelina Ilieva (BUL)	Fabienne Kocher (SUI)
−57 kg	Hélène Receveaux (FRA)	Ivelina Ilieva (BUL)	Loredana Ohai (ROU)
−63 kg	Nina Milošević (SLO)	Andreja Dakovic Cizmek (CRO)	Tereza Patockova (CZE)
−63 kg	Nina Milošević (SLO)	Andreja Dakovic Cizmek (CRO)	Ekaterina Valkova (RUS)
−70 kg	Kim Polling (NED)	Daria Davydova (RUS)	Olena Petrechenko (UKR)
−70 kg	Kim Polling (NED)	Daria Davydova (RUS)	Miriam Dunkel (GER)
−78 kg	Tereza Dzhurova (BUL)	Guusje Steenhuis (NED)	Ivanna Makukha (UKR)
−78 kg	Tereza Dzhurova (BUL)	Guusje Steenhuis (NED)	Ivana Maranić (CRO)
+78 kg	Janine Penders (NED)	Maryna Slutskaya (BLR)	Kristin Buessow (GER)
+78 kg	Janine Penders (NED)	Maryna Slutskaya (BLR)	Urska Urek (SLO)

Source Results
