= 2011 World Judo Cadets Championships =

Judo competition

Judo 2011 World Judo Cadets Championships
- Venue: Palace of Sports
- Location: Kyiv, Ukraine
- Dates: 11–14 August 2011
- Competitors: 610 from 58 nations

Competition at external databases
- Links: IJF • EJU • JudoInside

The 2011 World Judo Cadets Championships is an edition of the World Judo Cadets Championships, organised by the International Judo Federation. It was held in Kyiv, Ukraine from 11 to 14 August 2011.

== Medal summary ==
=== Medal table ===
* Host nation (Ukraine)

| Rank | Nation | Gold | Silver | Bronze | Total |
|---|---|---|---|---|---|
| 1 | Japan (JPN) | 7 | 3 | 3 | 13 |
| 2 | Russia (RUS) | 3 | 2 | 4 | 9 |
| 3 | Georgia (GEO) | 2 | 2 | 1 | 5 |
| 4 | Ukraine (UKR)* | 1 | 3 | 3 | 7 |
| 5 | Germany (GER) | 1 | 1 | 2 | 4 |
| 6 | France (FRA) | 1 | 0 | 2 | 3 |
| 7 | Brazil (BRA) | 1 | 0 | 1 | 2 |
| 8 | Netherlands (NED) | 0 | 2 | 0 | 2 |
| 9 | Italy (ITA) | 0 | 1 | 2 | 3 |
| 9 | Romania (ROU) | 0 | 1 | 2 | 3 |
| 11 | Chinese Taipei (TPE) | 0 | 1 | 0 | 1 |
| 12 | Azerbaijan (AZE) | 0 | 0 | 3 | 3 |
| 13 | Kazakhstan (KAZ) | 0 | 0 | 2 | 2 |
| 14 | Argentina (ARG) | 0 | 0 | 1 | 1 |
| 14 | Armenia (ARM) | 0 | 0 | 1 | 1 |
| 14 | Belgium (BEL) | 0 | 0 | 1 | 1 |
| 14 | Great Britain (GBR) | 0 | 0 | 1 | 1 |
| 14 | Moldova (MDA) | 0 | 0 | 1 | 1 |
| 14 | Slovenia (SLO) | 0 | 0 | 1 | 1 |
| 14 | South Korea (KOR) | 0 | 0 | 1 | 1 |
| Totals (20 entries) | | 16 | 16 | 32 | 64 |

=== Men's events ===
| Event | Gold | Silver | Bronze |
|---|---|---|---|
| −50 kg | Ryuju Nagayama (JPN) | Elios Manzi (ITA) | Sadikh Maharramov (AZE) |
| −50 kg | Ryuju Nagayama (JPN) | Elios Manzi (ITA) | Bogdan Iadov (UKR) |
| −55 kg | Pavlo Skopnenko (UKR) | Tsai Ming-yen (TPE) | Yerlan Serikzhanov (KAZ) |
| −55 kg | Pavlo Skopnenko (UKR) | Tsai Ming-yen (TPE) | Shapi Surakatov (RUS) |
| −60 kg | Yuma Oshima (JPN) | Eldar Gazimagomedov (RUS) | Arsen Ghazaryan (ARM) |
| −60 kg | Yuma Oshima (JPN) | Eldar Gazimagomedov (RUS) | Rashad Rufullayev (AZE) |
| −66 kg | Mikhail Igolnikov (RUS) | Norihito Isoda (JPN) | Viktor Makukha (UKR) |
| −66 kg | Mikhail Igolnikov (RUS) | Norihito Isoda (JPN) | Huseyn Rahimli (AZE) |
| −73 kg | Suleiman Vyshegurov (RUS) | Beka Dongvani (GEO) | Rustam Gerekov (RUS) |
| −73 kg | Suleiman Vyshegurov (RUS) | Beka Dongvani (GEO) | Levan Gugava (GEO) |
| −81 kg | Beka Gviniashvili (GEO) | Bohdan Zusko (UKR) | Yuma Nonouchi (JPN) |
| −81 kg | Beka Gviniashvili (GEO) | Bohdan Zusko (UKR) | David Tekic (GER) |
| −90 kg | Guram Tushishvili (GEO) | Shalva Chocheli (GEO) | Joubu Ebata (JPN) |
| −90 kg | Guram Tushishvili (GEO) | Shalva Chocheli (GEO) | Leon Strueber (GER) |
| +90 kg | Kensuke Tasaki (JPN) | Sergii Zvieriev (UKR) | Oleg Abaev (RUS) |
| +90 kg | Kensuke Tasaki (JPN) | Sergii Zvieriev (UKR) | Aleksey Sapunov (RUS) |

=== Women's events ===
| Event | Gold | Silver | Bronze |
|---|---|---|---|
| −40 kg | Tawany Silva (BRA) | Ruth Barna (ROU) | Evelyne Audiens (BEL) |
| −40 kg | Tawany Silva (BRA) | Ruth Barna (ROU) | Ana Budescu (MDA) |
| −44 kg | Irina Dolgova (RUS) | Misa Matsuo (JPN) | Nathalia Mercadante (BRA) |
| −44 kg | Irina Dolgova (RUS) | Misa Matsuo (JPN) | Sara Maria Romano (ITA) |
| −48 kg | Ami Kondo (JPN) | Demi Van Schijndel (NED) | Amandine Buchard (FRA) |
| −48 kg | Ami Kondo (JPN) | Demi Van Schijndel (NED) | Anja Štangar (SLO) |
| −52 kg | Kaho Yonezawa (JPN) | Theresa Stoll (GER) | Alexandra-Larisa Florian (ROU) |
| −52 kg | Kaho Yonezawa (JPN) | Theresa Stoll (GER) | Daniela Raia (ITA) |
| −57 kg | Rebecca Bräuninger (GER) | Do Velema (NED) | Stefania Adelina Dobre (ROU) |
| −57 kg | Rebecca Bräuninger (GER) | Do Velema (NED) | Tsukasa Yoshida (JPN) |
| −63 kg | Erina Ike (JPN) | Diana Dzhigaros (RUS) | Akerke Myrzabek (KAZ) |
| −63 kg | Erina Ike (JPN) | Diana Dzhigaros (RUS) | Katie-Jemima Yeats-Brown (GBR) |
| −70 kg | Adeline Bordat (FRA) | Mako Enda (JPN) | Jeong Hye-jin (KOR) |
| −70 kg | Adeline Bordat (FRA) | Mako Enda (JPN) | Noelia Ponce (ARG) |
| +70 kg | Sarah Asahina (JPN) | Yelyzaveta Kalanina (UKR) | Roudelie Caroly (FRA) |
| +70 kg | Sarah Asahina (JPN) | Yelyzaveta Kalanina (UKR) | Anastasiya Turchyn (UKR) |

Source Results
