= Jéssica Pereira =

Brazilian judoka (born 1994)

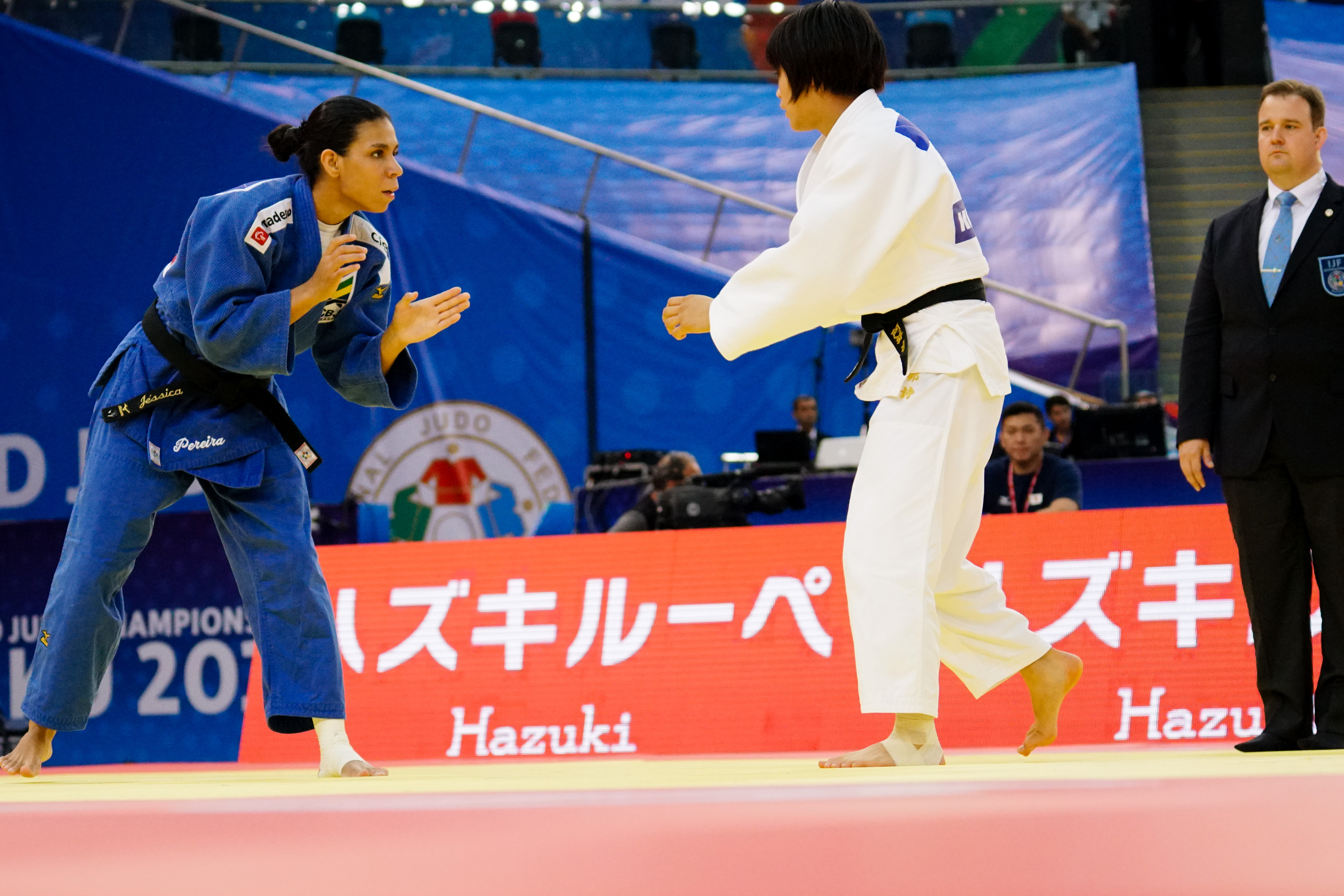

Personal information
- Born: 12 September 1994 (age 31) Rio de Janeiro, Rio de Janeiro, Brazil
- Occupation: Judoka

Sport
- Country: Brazil
- Sport: Judo
- Weight class: ‍–‍52 kg, ‍–‍57 kg

Achievements and titles
- World Champ.: 5th (2018)
- Pan American Champ.: (2017, 2018)
Medal record
Women's judo
Representing Brazil
Pan American Championships
Gold medal – first place	2017 Panama City	‍–‍52 kg
Gold medal – first place	2018 San José	‍–‍52 kg
Silver medal – second place	2025 Santiago	‍–‍52 kg
Bronze medal – third place	2020 Guadalajara	‍–‍57 kg
Bronze medal – third place	2021 Guadalajara	‍–‍57 kg
Bronze medal – third place	2023 Calgary	‍–‍52 kg
IJF Grand Slam
Bronze medal – third place	2016 Abu Dhabi	‍–‍52 kg
Bronze medal – third place	2018 Ekaterinburg	‍–‍52 kg
Bronze medal – third place	2025 Astana	‍–‍52 kg
IJF Grand Prix
Gold medal – first place	2018 Tunis	‍–‍52 kg
Gold medal – first place	2023 Zagreb	‍–‍52 kg
Gold medal – first place	2025 Lima	‍–‍52 kg
Gold medal – first place	2025 Guadalajara	‍–‍52 kg
Bronze medal – third place	2017 Zagreb	‍–‍52 kg
World Juniors Championships
Silver medal – second place	2013 Ljubljana	‍–‍52 kg
Pan American Junior Championships
Gold medal – first place	2014 San Salvador	‍–‍52 kg

Profile at external databases
- IJF: 10916
- JudoInside.com: 72400
- Updated on 19 October 2025

Jéssica Pereira (born 12 September 1994 in Rio de Janeiro) is a Brazilian judoka.

Pereira is a bronze medallist of the 2018 Judo Grand Slam Ekaterinburg in the ‍–‍52 kg category.
