= Natalia Kuziutina =

Russian judoka and mixed martial artist (born 1989)

- Born: Natalia Yuryevna Kuziutina; 8 May 1989 (age 37); Bryansk, Russian SFSR, Soviet Union
- Native name: Наталья Юрьевна Кузютина
- Other names: Kuzya
- Height: 5 ft 3 in (1.60 m)
- Weight: 116 lb (53 kg; 8.3 st)
- Division: Strawweight
- Reach: 64.5 in (164 cm)
- Style: Judo
- Fighting out of: Coconut Creek, Florida, United States
- Team: American Top Team
- Years active: 2022–present

Mixed martial arts record
- Total: 12
- Wins: 11
- By submission: 5
- By decision: 6
- Losses: 1
- By decision: 1

Other information
- Mixed martial arts record from Sherdog
- Judo career
- Weight class: ‍–‍52 kg
- Retired: 2021

Judo achievements and titles
- Olympic Games: (bronze) (2016)
- World Champ.: (silver) (2019)
- European Champ.: (gold) (2009, 2010, 2013, 2018)
Medal record
Women's judo
Representing Russia
Olympic Games
Bronze medal – third place	2016 Rio de Janeiro	‍–‍52 kg
World Championships
Silver medal – second place	2019 Tokyo	‍–‍52 kg
Bronze medal – third place	2010 Tokyo	‍–‍52 kg
Bronze medal – third place	2014 Chelyabinsk	‍–‍52 kg
Bronze medal – third place	2017 Budapest	‍–‍52 kg
European Games
Silver medal – second place	2019 Minsk	‍–‍52 kg
Bronze medal – third place	2015 Baku	‍–‍52 kg
European Championships
Gold medal – first place	2009 Tbilisi	‍–‍52 kg
Gold medal – first place	2009 Miskolc	Women's team
Gold medal – first place	2010 Vienna	‍–‍52 kg
Gold medal – first place	2012 Chelyabinsk	Women's team
Gold medal – first place	2013 Budapest	‍–‍52 kg
Gold medal – first place	2018 Tel Aviv	‍–‍52 kg
Silver medal – second place	2012 Chelyabinsk	‍–‍52 kg
Silver medal – second place	2014 Montpellier	‍–‍52 kg
Bronze medal – third place	2013 Budapest	Women's team
World Masters
Gold medal – first place	2015 Rabat	‍–‍52 kg
Gold medal – first place	2017 Saint Petersburg	‍–‍52 kg
Silver medal – second place	2016 Guadalajara	‍–‍52 kg
Bronze medal – third place	2018 Guangzhou	‍–‍52 kg
IJF Grand Slam
Gold medal – first place	2009 Paris	‍–‍52 kg
Gold medal – first place	2018 Ekaterinburg	‍–‍52 kg
Silver medal – second place	2009 Moscow	‍–‍52 kg
Bronze medal – third place	2010 Moscow	‍–‍52 kg
Bronze medal – third place	2011 Moscow	‍–‍52 kg
Bronze medal – third place	2014 Paris	‍–‍52 kg
Bronze medal – third place	2014 Abu Dhabi	‍–‍52 kg
Bronze medal – third place	2017 Paris	‍–‍52 kg
Bronze medal – third place	2017 Ekaterinburg	‍–‍52 kg
Bronze medal – third place	2019 Ekaterinburg	‍–‍52 kg
IJF Grand Prix
Gold medal – first place	2013 Qingdao	‍–‍52 kg
Gold medal – first place	2014 Düsseldorf	‍–‍52 kg
Gold medal – first place	2014 Qingdao	‍–‍52 kg
Gold medal – first place	2019 Perth	‍–‍52 kg
Silver medal – second place	2012 Düsseldorf	‍–‍52 kg
Bronze medal – third place	2013 Samsun	‍–‍52 kg
Bronze medal – third place	2014 Tbilisi	‍–‍52 kg
European U23 Championships
Gold medal – first place	2009 Antalya	‍–‍52 kg
European Junior Championships
Gold medal – first place	2007 Prague	‍–‍52 kg
European Cadet Championships
Gold medal – first place	2004 Rotterdam	‍–‍44 kg
Gold medal – first place	2005 Salzburg	‍–‍48 kg
Summer Universiade
Gold medal – first place	2013 Kazan	‍–‍52 kg
Bronze medal – third place	2013 Kazan	Women's team

Profile at external judo databases
- IJF: 366
- JudoInside.com: 33156

Natalia Yuryevna Kuziutina (Russian: Наталья Юрьевна Кузютина; born 8 May 1989) is a Russian mixed martial artist and former judoka, who competes in the Super Atomweight division of Rizin Fighting Federation. She formerly competed in the Women’s Strawweight division of the Legacy Fighting Alliance (LFA), where she was the former interim LFA Women's Strawweight Champion. Kuziutina also won a bronze at the 2016 Summer Olympics.

== Career ==
At the 2012 Summer Olympics, Kuziutina lost her first round match against Romy Tarangul.

Four years later, in Rio at the 2016 Summer Olympics, Kuziutina won a bronze medal. She beat Ecaterina Guica before losing to Misato Nakamura. Because Nakamura reached the semi-finals, Kuziutina was entered into the repechage. There she beat Christianne Legentil and then beat Ma Yingnan in her bronze medal match.

== Palmares ==
2009
(gold) Grand Slam Paris
(silver) Grand Slam Moscow
2010
(bronze) Grand Slam Moscow
2011
(bronze) Grand Slam Moscow
2012
(silver) Grand Prix Düsseldorf
2013
(gold) Grand Prix Qingdao
(bronze) Grand Prix Samsun
2014
(bronze) Grand Slam Paris
(gold) Grand Prix Düsseldorf
(bronze) Grand Prix Tbilisi
(bronze) Grand Slam Abu Dhabi
(gold) Grand Prix Qingdao
2015
(gold) World Masters Rabat
2016
(silver) World Masters Guadalajara
2017
(bronze) Grand Slam Paris
(bronze) Grand Slam Ekaterinburg
(gold) World Masters St. Petersburg
2018
(gold) Grand Slam Ekaterinburg
(bronze) World Masters Guangzhou
2019
(bronze) Grand Slam Ekaterinburg
(gold) Oceania Open Perth

== Mixed martial arts record ==
Professional record breakdown
12 matches	11 wins	1 loss
By submission	5	0
By decision	6	1

Res.	Record	Opponent	Method	Event	Date	Round	Time	Location	Notes
Win	11–1	Rena Kubota	Submission (guillotine choke)	Super Rizin 5	September 10, 2026	2	3:14	Osaka, Japan	
Win	10–1	Ayaka Hamasaki	Submission (armbar)	Rizin Landmark 13	April 12, 2026	1	4:54	Fukuoka, Japan	Super Atomweight debut.
Win	9–1	Rose Conceição	Decision (unanimous)	Ural FC 10	August 16, 2025	3	5:00	Perm, Russia	
Win	8–1	Ashley Yoder	Decision (split)	Tuff-N-Uff 144	May 22, 2025	3	5:00	San Diego, California, United States	
Win	7–1	Yasmin Guimarães	Decision (unanimous)	LFA 197	November 22, 2024	5	5:00	Cajamar, Brazil	Defended the interim LFA Women's Strawweight Championship.
Win	6–1	Bruna Ellen	Decision (unanimous)	LFA 189	August 2, 2024	5	5:00	Salamanca, New York, United States	Defended the interim LFA Women's Strawweight Championship.
Win	5–1	Giovanna Canuto	Decision (unanimous)	LFA 173	December 15, 2023	5	5:00	Las Vegas, Nevada, United States	Won the interim LFA Women's Strawweight Championship.
Win	4–1	CaySea McBride	Submission (armbar)	Titan FC 83	July 21, 2023	1	3:09	Hallandale Beach, Florida, United States	
Win	3–1	Monika Kučinič	Decision (unanimous)	Titan FC 82	June 2, 2023	3	5:00	Novi Sad, Serbia	
Win	2–1	Karen Quintero	Submission (armbar)	Titan FC 81	April 14, 2023	1	0:39	Santo Domingo, Dominican Republic	
Loss	1–1	Fatima Kline	Decision (unanimous)	Invicta FC 52	March 15, 2023	3	5:00	Denver, Colorado, United States	
Win	1–0	Desiree Bennett	Submission (armbar)	Gamebred Boxing 3	November 18, 2022	1	2:51	Biloxi, Mississippi, United States	Strawweight debut.

== See also ==
- List of female mixed martial artists
