= Park Da-sol =

South Korean judoka (born 1996)

Personal information
- Born: 21 January 1996 (age 30)
- Occupation: Judoka

Sport
- Country: South Korea
- Sport: Judo
- Weight class: ‍–‍52 kg

Achievements and titles
- Olympic Games: 7th (2020)
- World Champ.: R32 (2019)
- Asian Champ.: (gold) (2021)
Medal record
Women's judo
Representing South Korea
Asian Games
Silver medal – second place	2018 Jakarta	‍–‍52 kg
Asian Championships
Gold medal – first place	2021 Bishkek	‍–‍52 kg
Bronze medal – third place	2017 Hong Kong	‍–‍52 kg
IJF Grand Slam
Bronze medal – third place	2019 Abu Dhabi	‍–‍52 kg
IJF Grand Prix
Gold medal – first place	2013 Ulaanbaatar	‍–‍52 kg
Silver medal – second place	2019 Zagreb	‍–‍52 kg
Bronze medal – third place	2016 Almaty	‍–‍52 kg
Bronze medal – third place	2018 Hohhot	‍–‍52 kg
Bronze medal – third place	2020 Tel Aviv	‍–‍52 kg
Summer Universiade
Silver medal – second place	2019 Naples	‍–‍52 kg
Bronze medal – third place	2017 Taipei	‍–‍52 kg
Bronze medal – third place	2019 Naples	Women's team

Profile at external databases
- IJF: 10043
- JudoInside.com: 83023
- Updated on 21 May 2023

Park Da-sol (born 21 January 1996) is a South Korean judoka. She won the silver medal in the women's 52 kg event at the 2018 Asian Games held in Jakarta, Indonesia. In 2021, she competed in the women's 52 kg event at the 2020 Summer Olympics in Tokyo, Japan.

In 2019, Park won the silver medal in the women's 52 kg event at the Summer Universiade held in Naples, Italy. In that same year, she competed in the women's 52 kg event at the 2019 World Judo Championships held in Tokyo, Japan.

Park also competed in the women's 52 kg event at the 2021 Judo World Masters held in Doha, Qatar. A few months later, she won the gold medal in her event at the 2021 Asian-Pacific Judo Championships held in Bishkek, Kyrgyzstan.
