= Alesya Kuznetsova =

Russian judoka (born 1992)

Personal information
- Born: 30 March 1992 (age 34)
- Occupation: Judoka

Sport
- Country: Russia
- Sport: Judo
- Weight class: ‍–‍48 kg, ‍–‍52 kg

Achievements and titles
- World Champ.: 5th (2014)
- European Champ.: (silver) (2017)
Medal record
Women's judo
Representing Individual Neutral Athletes
IJF Grand Prix
Gold medal – first place	2023 Dushanbe	‍–‍52 kg
Representing the IJF
IJF Grand Slam
Silver medal – second place	2022 Ulaanbaatar	‍–‍52 kg
Representing Russia
European Championships
Silver medal – second place	2017 Warsaw	‍–‍52 kg
IJF Grand Slam
Silver medal – second place	2017 Ekaterinburg	‍–‍52 kg
Bronze medal – third place	2015 Tyumen	‍–‍48 kg
IJF Grand Prix
Gold medal – first place	2013 Qingdao	‍–‍48 kg
Silver medal – second place	2013 Abu Dhabi	‍–‍48 kg
Bronze medal – third place	2013 Samsun	‍–‍48 kg
Bronze medal – third place	2013 Miami	‍–‍48 kg
European U23 Championships
Bronze medal – third place	2012 Prague	‍–‍48 kg
World Juniors Championships
Silver medal – second place	2011 Cape Town	‍–‍48 kg
European Junior Championships
Gold medal – first place	2010 Samokov	‍–‍48 kg
Bronze medal – third place	2011 Lommel	‍–‍48 kg
European Cadet Championships
Silver medal – second place	2007 Valletta	‍–‍44 kg
Bronze medal – third place	2008 Sarajevo	‍–‍44 kg
Summer Universiade
Gold medal – first place	2013 Kazan	‍–‍48 kg
Bronze medal – third place	2013 Kazan	Women's team

Profile at external databases
- IJF: 3816
- JudoInside.com: 42562
- Updated on 3 June 2023

Alesya Kuznetsova (born 30 March 1992) is a Russian judoka. She is the 2017 European Judo Championships silver medalist in the ‍–‍52 kg division.

In 2019, Kuznetsova competed in the women's 52 kg event at the 2019 World Judo Championships held in Tokyo, Japan.
