= Ai Shishime =

Japanese judoka (born 1994)

Personal information
- Born: 25 January 1994 (age 32)
- Occupation: Judoka

Sport
- Country: Japan
- Sport: Judo
- Weight class: –52 kg
- Retired: 13 March 2024

Achievements and titles
- World Champ.: (2017, 2021)
- Asian Champ.: (gold) (2016, 2017)
Medal record
Women's judo
Representing Japan
World Championships
Gold medal – first place	2017 Budapest	‍–‍52 kg
Gold medal – first place	2021 Budapest	‍–‍52 kg
Silver medal – second place	2018 Baku	‍–‍52 kg
Bronze medal – third place	2019 Tokyo	‍–‍52 kg
Asian Championships
Gold medal – first place	2016 Tashkent	‍–‍52 kg
Gold medal – first place	2017 Hong Kong	‍–‍52 kg
Silver medal – second place	2022 Nur‑Sultan	‍–‍52 kg
World Masters
Gold medal – first place	2019 Qingdao	‍–‍52 kg
Silver medal – second place	2021 Doha	‍–‍52 kg
IJF Grand Slam
Gold medal – first place	2016 Tyumen	‍–‍52 kg
Gold medal – first place	2018 Düsseldorf	‍–‍52 kg
Gold medal – first place	2019 Paris	‍–‍52 kg
Silver medal – second place	2015 Tokyo	‍–‍52 kg
Silver medal – second place	2019 Baku	‍–‍52 kg
Silver medal – second place	2022 Tokyo	‍–‍52 kg
Silver medal – second place	2023 Tashkent	‍–‍52 kg
Bronze medal – third place	2013 Tokyo	‍–‍52 kg
Bronze medal – third place	2014 Tokyo	‍–‍52 kg
Bronze medal – third place	2015 Paris	‍–‍52 kg
Bronze medal – third place	2016 Tokyo	‍–‍52 kg
Bronze medal – third place	2017 Tokyo	‍–‍52 kg
Bronze medal – third place	2018 Osaka	‍–‍52 kg
Bronze medal – third place	2019 Osaka	‍–‍52 kg
Bronze medal – third place	2020 Paris	‍–‍52 kg
Bronze medal – third place	2022 Paris	‍–‍52 kg
IJF Grand Prix
Gold medal – first place	2015 Ulaanbaatar	‍–‍52 kg
Gold medal – first place	2016 Düsseldorf	‍–‍52 kg
Gold medal – first place	2018 Zagreb	‍–‍52 kg
Silver medal – second place	2014 Jeju	‍–‍52 kg
Bronze medal – third place	2017 Düsseldorf	‍–‍52 kg
Asian Junior Championships
Gold medal – first place	2012 Taipei	‍–‍52 kg
Summer Universiade
Bronze medal – third place	2013 Kazan	‍–‍52 kg

Profile at external databases
- IJF: 10017
- JudoInside.com: 82745
- Updated on 23 May 2023

Ai Shishime (志々目 愛, Shishime Ai; born 25 January 1994) is a Japanese retired judoka. She is a two-time gold medalist in the women's 52 kg event at the World Judo Championships.

== Career ==
She won a gold medal at the 2017 World Judo Championships in Budapest.

In 2019, she won the gold medal in the women's 52 kg event at the Judo World Masters held in Qingdao, China. In January 2021, she won the silver medal in her event at the Judo World Masters held in Doha, Qatar. In June 2021, she won the silver medal in the women's 52 kg event at the World Judo Championships held in Budapest, Hungary.
