= Majlinda Kelmendi =

Kosovo-Albanian judoka (born 1991)

Majlinda Kelmendi PMM
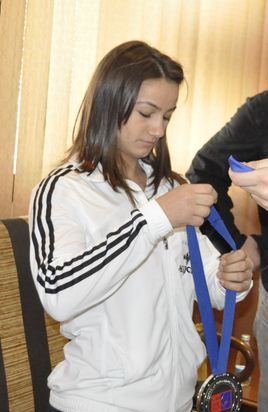

Personal information
- Nationality: Kosovan; Albanian
- Born: 9 May 1991 (age 35) Peja, SFR Yugoslavia (present-day Kosovo)
- Occupation: Judoka
- Years active: 1999–2021
- Height: 1.63 m (5 ft 4 in)
- Other interests
- Military career
- Allegiance: Albania
- Branch: Albanian Armed Forces
- Service years: 2023–
- Rank: Colonel

Sport
- Country: Kosovo
- Sport: Judo
- Weight class: –52 kg
- Coached by: Driton Kuka

Achievements and titles
- Olympic Games: (gold) (2016)
- World Champ.: (gold) (2013, 2014)
- European Champ.: (gold) (2014, 2016, 2017, 2019)
Medal record
Women's judo
Representing the (N/A) IJF
World Championships
Gold medal – first place	2014 Chelyabinsk	‍–‍52 kg
European Championships
Bronze medal – third place	2013 Budapest	‍–‍52 kg
Representing Kosovo
Olympic Games
Gold medal – first place	2016 Rio de Janeiro	‍–‍52 kg
World Championships
Gold medal – first place	2013 Rio de Janeiro	‍–‍52 kg
Bronze medal – third place	2019 Tokyo	‍–‍52 kg
European Games
Gold medal – first place	2019 Minsk	‍–‍52 kg
European Championships
Gold medal – first place	2014 Montpellier	‍–‍52 kg
Gold medal – first place	2016 Kazan	‍–‍52 kg
Gold medal – first place	2017 Warsaw	‍–‍52 kg
European U23 Championships
Gold medal – first place	2012 Prague	‍–‍52 kg
World Masters
Gold medal – first place	2013 Tyumen	‍–‍52 kg
Bronze medal – third place	2021 Doha	‍–‍52 kg
IJF Grand Slam
Gold medal – first place	2014 Paris	‍–‍52 kg
Gold medal – first place	2014 Abu Dhabi	‍–‍52 kg
Gold medal – first place	2015 Paris	‍–‍52 kg
Gold medal – first place	2016 Paris	‍–‍52 kg
Gold medal – first place	2017 Paris	‍–‍52 kg
Gold medal – first place	2019 Düsseldorf	‍–‍52 kg
Gold medal – first place	2019 Abu Dhabi	‍–‍52 kg
Silver medal – second place	2013 Paris	‍–‍52 kg
Silver medal – second place	2018 Abu Dhabi	‍–‍52 kg
Bronze medal – third place	2015 Abu Dhabi	‍–‍52 kg
Bronze medal – third place	2021 Tel Aviv	‍–‍52 kg
IJF Grand Prix
Gold medal – first place	2012 Abu Dhabi	‍–‍52 kg
Gold medal – first place	2013 Düsseldorf	‍–‍52 kg
Gold medal – first place	2013 Samsun	‍–‍52 kg
Gold medal – first place	2014 Samsun	‍–‍52 kg
Gold medal – first place	2014 Budapest	‍–‍52 kg
Gold medal – first place	2016 Budapest	‍–‍52 kg
Gold medal – first place	2018 Tashkent	‍–‍52 kg
Gold medal – first place	2019 Tel Aviv	‍–‍52 kg
Silver medal – second place	2011 Düsseldorf	‍–‍52 kg
Bronze medal – third place	2011 Amsterdam	‍–‍52 kg
Representing Albania
World Juniors Championships
Gold medal – first place	2009 Paris	‍–‍52 kg
European Junior Championships
Gold medal – first place	2009 Yerevan	‍–‍52 kg
Gold medal – first place	2010 Samokov	‍–‍52 kg
IJF Grand Prix
Gold medal – first place	2010 Tunis	‍–‍52 kg
Gold medal – first place	2011 Abu Dhabi	‍–‍52 kg

Profile at external databases
- IJF: 11273
- JudoInside.com: 42942
- Updated on 21 May 2023

Majlinda Kelmendi PMM (Albanian pronunciation: [majˈlinda kɛlˈmɛndi]; born 9 May 1991) is a Kosovan-Albanian former judoka and judo coach.

In 2014, Majlinda topped the IJF Women's Prestige World Ranking List. On 7 August 2016, she became the first Kosovan athlete to win a medal at the Olympic Games when she claimed gold in the women's 52 kg category at the 2016 Olympics in Rio de Janeiro. She also represented Albania at the 2012 Summer Olympics.

== Early life ==
Majlinda Kelmendi was born on 9 May 1991 into a Kosovo Albanian family in the city of Peja, then part of the Socialist Federal Republic of Yugoslavia, present-day Kosovo. She was the cousin (aunt's daughter) of the late Labinot Harbuzi, a Swedish footballer of Kosovan descent, who died in October 2018 after a cardiac arrest at age 32.

== Career ==
In 2009, Kelmendi won the gold medal at the World Junior Championships in Paris. In 2010, she came 5th at the World Junior Championships in Morocco and finished 9th in the 52 kg category at the 2010 World Judo Championships in Tokyo, Japan. She defeated Jaana Sundberg in the first round of the 2012 Olympics but then lost to Christianne Legentil in the second round.

At the 2013 World Judo Championships, Kelmendi gave Kosovo its first ever judo world title as she beat Brazil's Érika Miranda in the ‍–‍52 kg gold medal match in Rio de Janeiro. The 22-year-old—the first Kosovar judoka to win a medal at the championships since Kosovo's declaration of independence in 2008—was not a shock winner as she came to Rio de Janeiro ranked number one in her category, having won the prestigious 2013 World Masters event. Kelmendi retained the world title in 2014. She did not defend her title the following year due to injury.

In February 2016, she won the gold medal at Paris Grand Slam, making her third consecutive title after winning in 2014 and 2015. Two months later, she earned a gold medal at the 2016 European Championships in Kazan, Russia. At the 2016 Summer Olympics she became the first ever Kosovan athlete to win a gold medal, or any medal at all, for Kosovo at an Olympic Games. Controversy arose when reports emerged that she had declined to take an unscheduled doping control test in June in France; her trainer insists she is clean, and that she refused due to the tester having no authorisation from WADA.

Due to the resistance of the International Olympic Committee and the United Nations, Kelmendi was unable to represent Kosovo at the 2012 Summer Olympics in London. Also, IOC turned down Kelmendi's request to compete as an independent athlete. Kelmendi chose to represent Albania, as the vast majority of Kosovars are ethnic Albanians.

In October 2014, the International Olympic Committee provisionally recognised the Olympic Committee of Kosovo and gave it full membership on 9 December 2014. Kosovo participated at the 2016 Summer Olympics in Rio de Janeiro, Brazil, the country's first appearance at an Olympic event. Kelmendi was Kosovo's flag bearer during the Parade of Nations of the opening ceremony in Rio. Her gold medal in those games was Kosovo's first ever Olympic medal. She is also a citizen of Albania and has an Albanian passport.

In 2021, she won one of the bronze medals in her event at the 2021 Judo World Masters held in Doha, Qatar. A month later, she won one of the bronze medals in her event at the 2021 Judo Grand Slam Tel Aviv held in Tel Aviv, Israel. She competed in the women's 52 kg event at the 2020 Summer Olympics in Tokyo, Japan.

== Statistics ==
=== Medals record ===
2009
(bronze) 52 kg − World Cup, Prague
2010
(silver) 52 kg − World Cup, Sofia
(gold) 52 kg − European Cup, Sarajevo
(gold) 52 kg − Grand Prix, Tunis
(bronze) 52 kg − World Cup, Tallinn
2011
(silver) 52 kg − World Cup, Sofia
(silver) 52 kg − Grand Prix, Düsseldorf
(bronze) 52 kg − World Cup, Lisbon
(gold) 52 kg − World Cup, Rome
(gold) 52 kg − World Cup, Minsk
(gold) 52 kg − Grand Prix, Abu Dhabi
(bronze) 52 kg − Grand Prix, Amsterdam
2012
(gold) 52 kg − European Cup, Prague
(silver) 52 kg − World Cup, Rome
(gold) 52 kg − World Cup, Istanbul
(gold) 52 kg − Grand Prix, Abu Dhabi
2013
(silver) 52 kg − Grand Slam, Paris
(gold) 52 kg − Grand Prix, Düsseldorf
(gold) 52 kg − Grand Prix, Samsun
(bronze) 52 kg − European Championships, Budapest
(gold) 52 kg − World Masters, Tyumen
(gold) 52 kg − World Championships, Rio de Janeiro
2014
(gold) 52 kg − Grand Slam, Paris
(gold) 52 kg − Grand Prix, Samsun
(gold) 52 kg − European Championships, Montpellier
(gold) 52 kg − Grand Prix, Budapest
(gold) 52 kg − World Championships, Chelyabinsk
(gold) 52 kg − Grand Slam, Abu Dhabi
2015
(gold) 52 kg − European Cup, Prague
(gold) 52 kg − World Cup, Lisbon
(gold) 52 kg − Grand Slam, Paris
(bronze) 52 kg − Grand Slam, Abu Dhabi
2016
(gold) 52 kg − Grand Slam, Paris
(gold) 52 kg − European Championships, Kazan
(gold) 52 kg − Grand Prix, Budapest
(gold) 52 kg − Olympic Games, Rio de Janeiro
2017
(gold) 52 kg − Grand Slam, Paris
(gold) 52 kg − European Championships, Warsaw
2018
(silver) 52 kg − Grand Slam, Abu Dhabi
(gold) 52 kg − Grand Prix, Tashkent
2019
(gold) 52 kg − Grand Prix, Tel Aviv
(gold) 52 kg − Grand Slam, Düsseldorf
(gold) 52 kg − European Games, Minsk
(bronze) 52 kg − World Championships, Tokyo
(gold) 52 kg − Grand Slam, Abu Dhabi
2021
(bronze) 52 kg − World Masters, Doha
