= Anja Štangar =

Slovenian judoka (born 1996)

Personal information
- Nationality: Slovenian
- Born: 6 January 1996 (age 30)
- Occupation: Judoka

Sport
- Country: Slovenia
- Sport: Judo
- Weight class: –52 kg

Achievements and titles
- World Champ.: R64 (2019)
- European Champ.: 7th (2018)
Medal record
Women's judo
Representing Slovenia
IJF Grand Slam
Bronze medal – third place	2017 Baku	–52 kg
IJF Grand Prix
Bronze medal – third place	2017 Zagreb	–52 kg
Bronze medal – third place	2018 Tunis	–52 kg
Bronze medal – third place	2018 Tbilisi	–52 kg
Bronze medal – third place	2018 Antalya	–52 kg
World Cadets Championships
Bronze medal – third place	2011 Kyiv	–48 kg
European Cadet Championships
Bronze medal – third place	2011 Cottonera	–48 kg
Bronze medal – third place	2012 Bar	–48 kg

Profile at external databases
- IJF: 7809
- JudoInside.com: 73732
- Updated on 25 November 2022

Anja Štangar (born 6 January 1996) is a Slovenian judoka.

She is the bronze medallist of the 2017 Judo Grand Slam Baku in the -52 kg category.
