= Nguyễn Thị Thanh Thủy =

Vietnamese judoka

Personal information
- Full name: Nguyễn Thị Thanh Thủy
- Nationality: Vietnamese
- Born: November 24, 1993 (age 32) Tra Vinh
- Occupation: Judoka

Sport
- Country: Vietnam
- Sport: Judo
- Weight class: -52 kg
Medal record
Women's Judo
Representing Vietnam
Southeast Asian Games
Gold medal – first place	Singapore 2015	-52 kg
Bronze medal – third place	Philippines 2019	-52 kg
- Updated on 16 September 2022

Nguyễn Thị Thanh Thủy (born 24 November 1993 in Trà Vinh) is a Vietnamese judoka and a former boxer.

== Career ==
From Tra Vinh, her brother Nguyen Thanh Hoang is a Judo referee. She is a former boxer. She came to prominence when she won gold at the 2015 Southeast Asian Games in the (-52kg) weight category despite being only a late replacement in the squad. She was selected to compete at the 2020 Summer Games and lost against Romanian Andreea Chițu in the first round.
