= Angelica Delgado =

American judoka (born 1990)

Personal information
- Born: December 14, 1990 (age 35)
- Occupation: Judoka

Sport
- Country: United States
- Sport: Judo
- Weight class: ‍–‍52 kg

Achievements and titles
- Olympic Games: R16 (2020, 2024)
- World Champ.: R16 (2013, 2017, 2018, 2024)
- Pan American Champ.: (2015, 2018, 2019, 2021, 2022, 2024)
Medal record
Women's judo
Representing United States
Pan American Games
Bronze medal – third place	2011 Guadalajara	‍–‍52 kg
Bronze medal – third place	2015 Toronto	‍–‍52 kg
Bronze medal – third place	2023 Santiago	‍–‍52 kg
Pan American Championships
Silver medal – second place	2015 Edmonton	‍–‍52 kg
Silver medal – second place	2018 San José	‍–‍52 kg
Silver medal – second place	2019 Lima	‍–‍52 kg
Silver medal – second place	2021 Guadalajara	‍–‍52 kg
Silver medal – second place	2022 Lima	‍–‍52 kg
Silver medal – second place	2024 Rio de Janeiro	‍–‍52 kg
Bronze medal – third place	2011 Guadalajara	‍–‍52 kg
Bronze medal – third place	2016 Havana	‍–‍52 kg
Bronze medal – third place	2017 Panama City	‍–‍52 kg
IJF Grand Slam
Silver medal – second place	2016 Abu Dhabi	‍–‍52 kg
Bronze medal – third place	2020 Düsseldorf	‍–‍52 kg
Bronze medal – third place	2022 Budapest	‍–‍52 kg
IJF Grand Prix
Silver medal – second place	2019 Montreal	‍–‍52 kg
Bronze medal – third place	2016 Zagreb	‍–‍52 kg
Bronze medal – third place	2017 Cancún	‍–‍52 kg
Bronze medal – third place	2018 Zagreb	‍–‍52 kg
Bronze medal – third place	2019 Perth	‍–‍52 kg
Bronze medal – third place	2022 Perth	‍–‍52 kg

Profile at external databases
- IJF: 1503
- JudoInside.com: 36955
- Updated on July 28, 2024

Angelica Delgado (born December 14, 1990) is an American judoka.

== Career ==
Delgado competed in judo in the 52kg division of the 2016, 2020, and 2024 Olympics.

== Personal life ==
Delgado's father, Miguel, was a Cuban judoka who defected to the United States in the 1980s.
