= Evelyne Tschopp =

Swiss judoka (born 1991)

Personal information
- Born: 19 June 1991 (age 35)
- Occupation: Judoka

Sport
- Country: Switzerland
- Sport: Judo
- Weight class: ‍–‍52 kg

Achievements and titles
- Olympic Games: R16 (2016)
- World Champ.: R16 (2018, 2019, 2021)
- European Champ.: (bronze) (2017, 2018)
Medal record
Women's judo
Representing Switzerland
European Championships
Bronze medal – third place	2017 Warsaw	‍–‍52 kg
Bronze medal – third place	2018 Tel Aviv	‍–‍52 kg
IJF Grand Slam
Silver medal – second place	2015 Paris	‍–‍52 kg
Bronze medal – third place	2021 Kazan	‍–‍52 kg
IJF Grand Prix
Gold medal – first place	2016 Almaty	‍–‍52 kg
Gold medal – first place	2018 Agadir	‍–‍52 kg
Silver medal – second place	2018 Tbilisi	‍–‍52 kg
Silver medal – second place	2018 Tashkent	‍–‍52 kg
Silver medal – second place	2019 Hohhot	‍–‍52 kg
Bronze medal – third place	2018 Cancún	‍–‍52 kg
Bronze medal – third place	2019 Perth	‍–‍52 kg
Summer Universiade
Bronze medal – third place	2015 Gwangju	‍–‍52 kg

Profile at external databases
- IJF: 15965
- JudoInside.com: 39669
- Updated on 11 November 2022

Evelyne Tschopp (born 19 June 1991) is a Swiss judoka.

Tschopp competed at the 2016 Summer Olympics in Rio de Janeiro, in the women's 52 kg.

In 2020, Tschopp competed in the women's 52 kg event at the 2020 European Judo Championships held in Prague, Czech Republic.
