= Madelene Rubinstein =

Norwegian judoka

Personal information
- Nationality: Norwegian
- Born: 28 February 1995 (age 31)

Sport
- Country: Norway
- Sport: Judo

Achievements and titles
- National finals: nine victories

Madelene Rubinstein (born 28 February 1995) is a Norwegian judoka.

She competed at the 2017 European Judo Championships in Warsaw, where she was defeated by bronze medalist Joana Ramos, and she competed at the 2017 World Judo Championships in Budapest.

Rubinstein has won nine (senior) gold medals in Norwegian championships, and is two times Nordic champion.

In 2019, she competed in the women's 52 kg event at the 2019 World Judo Championships held in Tokyo, Japan.
