= Alexandra-Larisa Florian =

Romanian-born Azerbaijani judoka

Personal information
- Nationality: Azerbaijani
- Born: 8 August 1995 (age 30) Oradea, Bihor, Romania
- Occupation: Judoka

Sport
- Country: Romania (2011–18); Azerbaijan (since 2019)
- Sport: Judo
- Weight class: ‍–‍52 kg, ‍–‍57 kg

Achievements and titles
- World Champ.: R16 (2017)
- European Champ.: 5th (2015)
Medal record
Women's judo
Representing Romania
World Masters
Bronze medal – third place	2017 Saint Petersburg	‍–‍52 kg
IJF Grand Slam
Gold medal – first place	2017 Baku	‍–‍52 kg
Bronze medal – third place	2017 Abu Dhabi	‍–‍52 kg
IJF Grand Prix
Silver medal – second place	2018 Agadir	‍–‍52 kg
Bronze medal – third place	2013 Jeju	‍–‍52 kg
Bronze medal – third place	2016 Budapest	‍–‍52 kg
Bronze medal – third place	2017 Düsseldorf	‍–‍52 kg
European U23 Championships
Gold medal – first place	2013 Samokov	‍–‍52 kg
Silver medal – second place	2016 Tel Aviv	‍–‍52 kg
Silver medal – second place	2017 Podgorica	‍–‍52 kg
World Juniors Championships
Silver medal – second place	2014 Fort Lauderdale	‍–‍52 kg
Bronze medal – third place	2013 Ljubljana	‍–‍52 kg
European Junior Championships
Bronze medal – third place	2013 Sarajevo	‍–‍52 kg
World Cadets Championships
Bronze medal – third place	2011 Kyiv	‍–‍52 kg
European Cadet Championships
Gold medal – first place	2011 Cottonera	‍–‍52 kg
Summer Universiade
Silver medal – second place	2015 Gwangju	‍–‍52 kg

Profile at external databases
- IJF: 3392, 49661
- JudoInside.com: 66015
- Updated on 20 November 2022

Alexandra-Larisa Florian (born 8 August 1995) is a Romanian-born Azerbaijani judoka.

Florian is a bronze medalist from the 2017 Judo World Masters in the ‍–‍52 kg category.
