= Ecaterina Guica =

Canadian judoka (born 1993)

Personal information
- Born: 9 October 1993 (age 32)
- Occupation: Judoka

Sport
- Country: Canada
- Sport: Judo
- Weight class: ‍–‍52 kg

Achievements and titles
- Olympic Games: R16 (2016)
- World Champ.: R16 (2021)
- Pan American Champ.: (2020)
Medal record
Women's judo
Representing Canada
Pan American Games
Silver medal – second place	2015 Toronto	‍–‍52 kg
Pan American Championships
Gold medal – first place	2020 Guadalajara	‍–‍52 kg
Silver medal – second place	2016 Havana	‍–‍52 kg
Bronze medal – third place	2015 Edmonton	‍–‍52 kg
Bronze medal – third place	2017 Panama City	‍–‍52 kg
Bronze medal – third place	2018 San José	‍–‍52 kg
IJF Grand Prix
Silver medal – second place	2017 Hohhot	‍–‍52 kg
Bronze medal – third place	2018 Budapest	‍–‍52 kg
Bronze medal – third place	2019 Hohhot	‍–‍52 kg

Profile at external databases
- IJF: 2698
- JudoInside.com: 50973
- Updated on 29 November 2022

Ecaterina Guică (born 9 October 1993, in Bucharest, Romania) is a Canadian judoka who competes in the women's 52 kg category. She has been ranked in the top 10 of the world in her weight category.

== Career ==
In 2010, Guica competed at the inaugural Summer Youth Olympics in Singapore.

In June 2016, she was named to Canada's Olympic team.

In June 2021, Guica was named to Canada's 2020 Olympic team.

== See also ==
- Judo in Quebec
- Judo in Canada
- List of Canadian judoka
