= İrem Korkmaz =

Turkish judoka (born 1998)

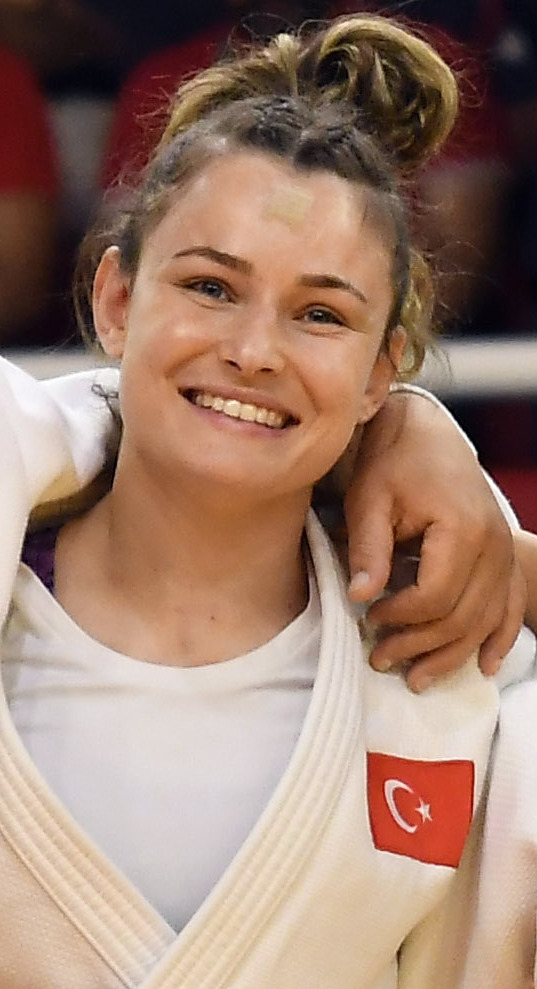
- Korkmaz in 2022

Personal information
- Born: 31 August 1998 (age 27) Balıkesir, Turkey
- Occupation: Judoka

Sport
- Country: Turkey
- Sport: Judo
- Weight class: –52 kg

Achievements and titles
- World Champ.: R32 (2018, 2021)
- European Champ.: 5th (2018)
Medal record
Women's judo
Representing Turkey
Islamic Solidarity Games
Gold medal – first place	2017 Baku	–52 kg
Gold medal – first place	2017 Baku	Women's team
Gold medal – first place	2021 Konya	Women's team
Bronze medal – third place	2021 Konya	–57 kg
Mediterranean Games
Bronze medal – third place	2018 Tarragona	–52 kg
European Junior Championships
Gold medal – first place	2017 Maribor	–52 kg
Silver medal – second place	2016 Málaga	–52 kg
World Cadets Championships
Bronze medal – third place	2015 Sarajevo	–52 kg

Profile at external databases
- IJF: 20937
- JudoInside.com: 30392
- Updated on 14 June 2022

İrem Korkmaz (born 31 August 1998) is a Turkish judoka who competes internationally. She is a European Junior champion, Islamic Solidarity Games champion, World Cadets bronze medalist and Mediterranean Games bronze medalist. She has also won the Turkish national championships six times.

Korkmaz narrowly missed a place for the 2020 Summer Olympics when she lost in the second round of the 2021 World Judo Championships to eventual Olympic bronze medalist Fabienne Kocher of Switzerland.
