= Agata Perenc =

Polish judoka (born 1990)

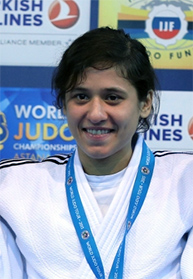

Personal information
- Born: 19 March 1990 (age 36) Rybnik, Poland
- Occupation: Judoka

Sport
- Country: Poland
- Sport: Judo
- Weight class: ‍–‍52 kg

Achievements and titles
- Olympic Games: R32 (2020)
- World Champ.: R16 (2017, 2018, 2019)
- European Champ.: 5th (2019)
Medal record
Women's judo
Representing Poland
IJF Grand Prix
Silver medal – second place	2017 Tashkent	‍–‍52 kg
Silver medal – second place	2018 Cancún	‍–‍52 kg
Bronze medal – third place	2015 Samsun	‍–‍52 kg
Bronze medal – third place	2015 Zagreb	‍–‍52 kg
Bronze medal – third place	2016 Almaty	‍–‍52 kg
Bronze medal – third place	2018 Tashkent	‍–‍52 kg
Summer Universiade
Silver medal – second place	2013 Kazan	Women's team
Bronze medal – third place	2011 Shenzhen	Women's team

Profile at external databases
- IJF: 1593
- JudoInside.com: 42723
- Updated on 30 November 2022

Agata Perenc (born 19 March 1990) is a Polish judoka.

Perenc is the silver medallist of the 2018 Judo Grand Prix Cancún in the ‍–‍52 kg category.

In 2021, Perenc represented Poland at the 2020 Summer Olympics in Tokyo, Japan. She competed in the women's 52 kg event.
