= Karolina Pieńkowska =

Polish judoka

Personal information
- Nationality: Polish
- Born: 17 August 1993 (age 32)
- Occupation: Judoka

Sport
- Country: Poland
- Sport: Judo
- Weight class: –52 kg

Achievements and titles
- World Champ.: R32 (2015, 2018)
- European Champ.: 7th (2019)
Medal record
Women's judo
Representing Poland
IJF Grand Slam
| Silver medal – second place | 2018 Düsseldorf | –52 kg |
IJF Grand Prix
| Gold medal – first place | 2016 Zagreb | –52 kg |
| Bronze medal – third place | 2016 Budapest | –52 kg |
European U23 Championships
| Gold medal – first place | 2015 Bratislava | –52 kg |
European Junior Championships
| Bronze medal – third place | 2010 Samokov | –48 kg |
| Bronze medal – third place | 2012 Poreč | –52 kg |

Profile at external databases
- IJF: 18169
- JudoInside.com: 52840
- Updated on 26 November 2022

Karolina Pieńkowska (born 17 August 1993) is a Polish judoka.

She is the silver medallist of the 2018 Judo Grand Slam Düsseldorf in the -52 kg category.
