= Joana Ramos =

Portuguese judoka (born 1982)

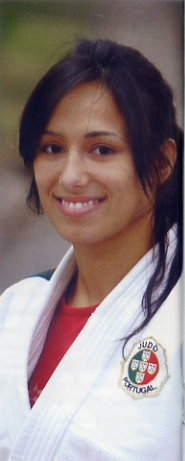
- Ramos in 2008

Personal information
- Full name: Joana Isabel Ventura Ramos
- Born: 16 January 1982 (age 44) Coimbra, Portugal
- Occupation: Judoka

Sport
- Country: Portugal
- Sport: Judo
- Weight class: ‍–‍52 kg

Achievements and titles
- Olympic Games: R16 (2012, 2016)
- World Champ.: 5th (2011, 2019, 2021)
- European Champ.: (silver) (2011)
Medal record
Women's judo
Representing Portugal
European Games
Silver medal – second place	2019 Minsk	Mixed team
European Championships
Silver medal – second place	2011 Istanbul	‍–‍52 kg
Bronze medal – third place	2017 Warsaw	‍–‍52 kg
IJF Grand Slam
Gold medal – first place	2015 Tyumen	‍–‍52 kg
Silver medal – second place	2010 Moscow	‍–‍52 kg
Bronze medal – third place	2011 Moscow	‍–‍52 kg
Bronze medal – third place	2021 Tbilisi	‍–‍52 kg
IJF Grand Prix
Gold medal – first place	2010 Abu Dhabi	‍–‍52 kg
Gold medal – first place	2014 Astana	‍–‍52 kg
Silver medal – second place	2010 Düsseldorf	‍–‍52 kg
Silver medal – second place	2014 Zagreb	‍–‍52 kg
Bronze medal – third place	2013 Rijeka	‍–‍52 kg
Bronze medal – third place	2014 Tashkent	‍–‍52 kg
Bronze medal – third place	2015 Budapest	‍–‍52 kg
Bronze medal – third place	2017 Tbilisi	‍–‍52 kg
Bronze medal – third place	2018 Cancún	‍–‍52 kg
European U23 Championships
Bronze medal – third place	2004 Ljubljana	‍–‍52 kg

Profile at external databases
- IJF: 178
- JudoInside.com: 6686
- Updated on 11 November 2022

Joana Isabel Ventura Ramos (born 16 January 1982) is a Portuguese judoka who competes in the women's 52 kg category. At the 2012 Summer Olympics, she was defeated in the second round.

In 2021, Ramos competed in the women's 52 kg event at the 2020 Summer Olympics in Tokyo, Japan.
