= Amandine Buchard =

French judoka (born 1995)

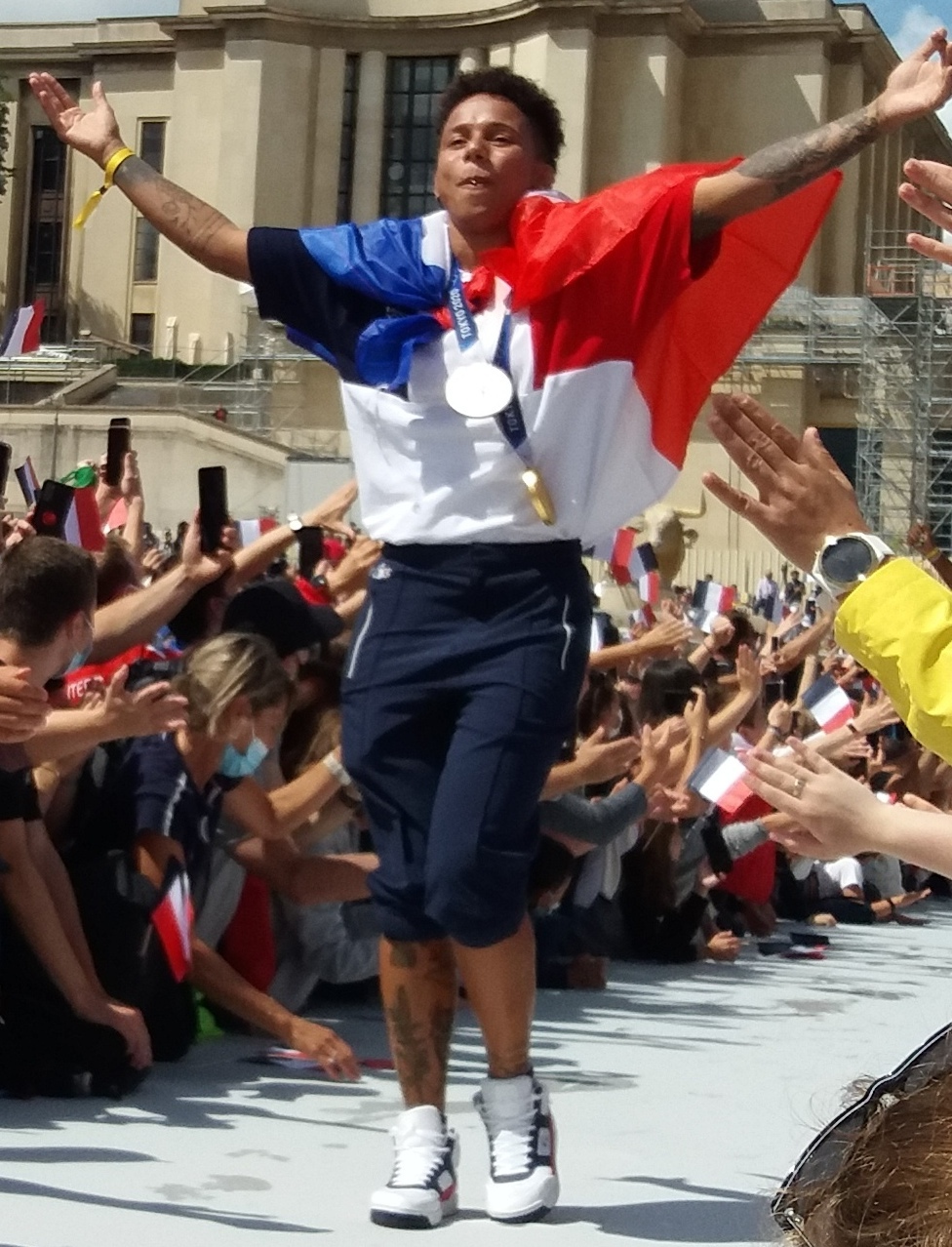
- Buchard on August 8, 2021 at Palais de Chaillot

Personal information
- Born: 12 July 1995 (age 31) Noisy-le-Sec, France
- Occupation: Judoka
- Height: 1.60 m (5 ft 3 in)

Sport
- Country: France
- Sport: Judo
- Weight class: ‍–‍52 kg, ‍–‍57 kg
- Rank: 3rd dan black belt

Achievements and titles
- Olympic Games: (silver) (2020)
- World Champ.: (bronze) (2014, 2018, 2022, 2023, 2024)
- European Champ.: (gold) (2021, 2023)
- Highest world ranking: 1^{st}
Medal record
Women's judo
Representing France
Olympic Games
Gold medal – first place	2020 Tokyo	Mixed team
Gold medal – first place	2024 Paris	Mixed team
Silver medal – second place	2020 Tokyo	‍–‍52 kg
Bronze medal – third place	2024 Paris	‍–‍52 kg
World Championships
Silver medal – second place	2022 Tashkent	Mixed team
Bronze medal – third place	2014 Chelyabinsk	‍–‍48 kg
Bronze medal – third place	2018 Baku	‍–‍52 kg
Bronze medal – third place	2022 Tashkent	‍–‍52 kg
Bronze medal – third place	2023 Doha	‍–‍52 kg
Bronze medal – third place	2024 Abu Dhabi	‍–‍52 kg
European Games
Bronze medal – third place	2019 Minsk	‍–‍52 kg
European Championships
Gold medal – first place	2021 Lisbon	‍–‍52 kg
Gold medal – first place	2023 Montpellier	‍–‍52 kg
Silver medal – second place	2014 Montpellier	‍–‍48 kg
Silver medal – second place	2022 Sofia	‍–‍52 kg
Silver medal – second place	2026 Tbilisi	‍–‍52 kg
World Masters
Gold medal – first place	2021 Doha	‍–‍52 kg
Gold medal – first place	2023 Budapest	‍–‍52 kg
Silver medal – second place	2017 Saint Petersburg	‍–‍52 kg
Silver medal – second place	2018 Guangzhou	‍–‍52 kg
Silver medal – second place	2019 Qingdao	‍–‍52 kg
IJF Grand Slam
Gold medal – first place	2019 Baku	‍–‍52 kg
Gold medal – first place	2019 Osaka	‍–‍52 kg
Gold medal – first place	2020 Budapest	‍–‍52 kg
Gold medal – first place	2021 Abu Dhabi	‍–‍52 kg
Gold medal – first place	2022 Paris	‍–‍52 kg
Gold medal – first place	2023 Antalya	‍–‍52 kg
Gold medal – first place	2024 Tashkent	‍–‍52 kg
Gold medal – first place	2025 Tbilisi	‍–‍52 kg
Gold medal – first place	2025 Dushanbe	‍–‍52 kg
Silver medal – second place	2018 Paris	‍–‍52 kg
Silver medal – second place	2020 Düsseldorf	‍–‍52 kg
Silver medal – second place	2023 Ulaanbaatar	‍–‍52 kg
Silver medal – second place	2026 Abu Dhabi	‍–‍52 kg
Bronze medal – third place	2014 Paris	‍–‍48 kg
Bronze medal – third place	2017 Ekaterinburg	‍–‍52 kg
Bronze medal – third place	2017 Tokyo	‍–‍52 kg
Bronze medal – third place	2018 Osaka	‍–‍52 kg
Bronze medal – third place	2023 Paris	‍–‍52 kg
Bronze medal – third place	2026 Paris	‍–‍52 kg
IJF Grand Prix
Gold medal – first place	2013 Abu Dhabi	‍–‍48 kg
Gold medal – first place	2014 Jeju	‍–‍48 kg
Gold medal – first place	2017 Tbilisi	‍–‍52 kg
Gold medal – first place	2018 Tbilisi	‍–‍52 kg
Gold medal – first place	2019 Marrakesh	‍–‍52 kg
Gold medal – first place	2025 Guadalajara	‍–‍57 kg
Silver medal – second place	2017 Düsseldorf	‍–‍52 kg
Silver medal – second place	2018 Zagreb	‍–‍52 kg
Silver medal – second place	2025 Lima	‍–‍57 kg
World Juniors Championships
Gold medal – first place	2014 Fort Lauderdale	‍–‍52 kg
Bronze medal – third place	2013 Ljubljana	‍–‍48 kg
World Cadets Championships
Bronze medal – third place	2011 Kyiv	‍–‍48 kg
European Cadet Championships
Silver medal – second place	2011 Cottonera	‍–‍48 kg

Profile at external databases
- IJF: 7539
- JudoInside.com: 67320
- Updated on 29 October 2026

Amandine Buchard (born 12 July 1995) is a French judoka. She represented France at the 2020 Summer Olympics winning the silver medal in the half lightweight event and a gold medal in the mixed team event. She is a third dan black belt.

== Career ==
Buchard won a bronze medal at the 2014 World Championships in Chelyabinsk, Russia.

Buchard was junior world champion in 2014, having won the 2014 World Juniors Championships.

In 2019, Buchard won the silver medal in the women's 52 kg event at the 2019 Judo World Masters held in Qingdao, China. In 2021, she won the gold medal in her event at the 2021 Judo World Masters held in Doha, Qatar. At the 2021 Judo Grand Slam Abu Dhabi held in Abu Dhabi, United Arab Emirates, she won the gold medal in her event.

Buchard won the gold medal in her event at the 2022 Judo Grand Slam Paris.

She won a bronze medal in the women's 52 kg event at the 2024 World Judo Championships held in Abu Dhabi, United Arab Emirates. She also won bronze in the same category in the 2024 Summer Olympics.

== Personal life ==
Buchard was born in Noisy-le-Sec to a father from Metropolitan France and a mother from the French overseas department of Martinique. She is openly lesbian.
