= 2023 World Judo Championships – Women's 52 kg =

Judo competition

Judo Women's 52 kg at the 2023 World Judo Championships
- Venue: Ali Bin Hamad Al Attiya Arena
- Location: Doha, Qatar
- Date: 8 May 2023
- Competitors: 46 from 36 nations
- Total prize money: €57,000

Medalists
gold medal	Uta Abe (4th title)	Japan
silver medal	Diyora Keldiyorova	Uzbekistan
bronze medal	Amandine Buchard	France
bronze medal	Odette Giuffrida	Italy

Competition at external databases
- Links: IJF • JudoInside

The Women's 52 kg event at the 2023 World Judo Championships was held at the Ali Bin Hamad al-Attiyah Arena in Doha, Qatar on 8 May 2023.

== Results ==
=== Finals ===
Semi-finals
(Kosovo) Distria Krasniqi	00
(Japan) Uta Abe	02
(Hungary) Réka Pupp	00
(Uzbekistan) Diyora Keldiyorova	11

Final
(Japan) Uta Abe	10
(Uzbekistan) Diyora Keldiyorova	00

=== Repechage ===
Repechage
(South Korea) Jang Se-yun	00
(France) Amandine Buchard	01
(Italy) Odette Giuffrida	01
(Israel) Gefen Primo	00

Bronze medal
(France) Amandine Buchard	01
(Hungary) Réka Pupp	00
(Italy) Odette Giuffrida	01
(Kosovo) Distria Krasniqi	00

=== Pool A ===
First round
(Mozambique) Jacira Ferreira	00
(Germany) Mascha Ballhaus	10
(Mongolia) Lkhagvasürengiin Sosorbaram	00
(Belgium) Amber Ryheul	10
(Kazakhstan) Tolganay Abeuova	00
(South Korea) Jang Se-yun	10
(Bulgaria) Gabriela Dimitrova	00
(Uzbekistan) Sita Kadamboeva	10

Round of 32
(Kosovo) Distria Krasniqi	10
(Germany) Mascha Ballhaus	00
(Belgium) Amber Ryheul	11
(Portugal) Maria Siderot	00
(Spain) Ana Pérez Box	00
(South Korea) Jang Se-yun	01
(Uzbekistan) Sita Kadamboeva	00
(China) Zhu Yeqing	01

Round of 16
(Kosovo) Distria Krasniqi	10
(Belgium) Amber Ryheul	00
(South Korea) Jang Se-yun	10
(China) Zhu Yeqing	00

Quarter-finals
(Kosovo) Distria Krasniqi	10
(South Korea) Jang Se-yun	00

=== Pool B ===
First round
(Cape Verde) Djamila Silva	00
(United States) Angelica Delgado	01
(Haiti) Jennifer Etienne	00
(Argentina) Sofía Fiora	02
(Switzerland) Fabienne Kocher	10
(Venezuela) Fabiola Díaz	00

Round of 32
(France) Amandine Buchard	01
(United States) Angelica Delgado	00
(Argentina) Sofía Fiora	00
(Azerbaijan) Gultaj Mammadaliyeva	02
(Japan) Uta Abe	02
(Croatia) Ana Viktorija Puljiz	00
(Switzerland) Fabienne Kocher	10
(Cyprus) Adamantia Christodoulidou	00

Round of 16
(France) Amandine Buchard	10
(Azerbaijan) Gultaj Mammadaliyeva	00
(Japan) Uta Abe	10
(Switzerland) Fabienne Kocher	00

Quarter-finals
(France) Amandine Buchard	00
(Japan) Uta Abe	10

=== Pool C ===
First round
(Cyprus) Sofia Asvesta	00
(Belgium) Charline Van Snick	11
(Australia) Tinka Easton	02
(Turkmenistan) Saýara Rozyýewa	00
(Kosovo) Erza Muminoviq	00
(Azerbaijan) Aydan Valiyeva	10
(Portugal) Joana Diogo	00
(Morocco) Soumiya Iraoui	01

Round of 32
(Hungary) Réka Pupp	11
(Belgium) Charline Van Snick	01
(Australia) Tinka Easton	02
(Senegal) Léa Buet	00
(Italy) Odette Giuffrida	02
(Azerbaijan) Aydan Valiyeva	00
(Morocco) Soumiya Iraoui	01
Alesya Kuznetsova	00

Round of 16
(Hungary) Réka Pupp	10
(Australia) Tinka Easton	00
(Italy) Odette Giuffrida	01
(Morocco) Soumiya Iraoui	00

Quarter-finals
(Hungary) Réka Pupp	10
(Italy) Odette Giuffrida	00

=== Pool D ===
First round
(Spain) Estrella López Sheriff	10
(Cameroon) Marie Céline Baba Matia	00
(Canada) Kelly Deguchi	10
(South Africa) Charne Griesel	01
(Mexico) Paulina Martínez	00
(Poland) Aleksandra Kaleta	10

Round of 32
(Uzbekistan) Diyora Keldiyorova	10
(Spain) Estrella López Sheriff	00
(Canada) Kelly Deguchi	10
(China) Liu Ben	10
(Israel) Gefen Primo	10
(Mongolia) Myagmarsürengiin Nandin-Erdene	00
(Poland) Aleksandra Kaleta	00
(Switzerland) Binta Ndiaye	10

Round of 16
(Uzbekistan) Diyora Keldiyorova	w/o
Bye
(Israel) Gefen Primo	10
(Switzerland) Binta Ndiaye	00

Quarter-finals
(Uzbekistan) Diyora Keldiyorova	02
(Israel) Gefen Primo	00

== Prize money ==
The sums listed bring the total prizes awarded to €57,000 for the individual event.

Medal	Total	Judoka	Coach
Gold	€26,000	€20,800	€5,200
Silver	€15,000	€12,000	€3,000
Bronze	€8,000	€6,400	€1,600
