= 2025 World Judo Championships – Women's 52 kg =

Judo competition

Judo Women's 52 kg at the 2025 World Judo Championships
- Venue: László Papp Budapest Sports Arena
- Location: Budapest, Hungary
- Date: 14 June 2025
- Competitors: 35 from 29 nations
- Total prize money: €57,000

Medalists
| gold medal | Uta Abe (5th title) | Japan |
| silver medal | Distria Krasniqi | Kosovo |
| bronze medal | Róza Gyertyás | Hungary |
| bronze medal | Mascha Ballhaus | Germany |

Competition at external databases
- Links: IJF • JudoInside

The Women's 52 kg event at the 2025 World Judo Championships was held at the László Papp Budapest Sports Arena in Budapest, Hungary on 14 June 2025.

== Results ==
=== Finals ===
Semi-finals
(Japan) Uta Abe | 100 (yellow card)
(Germany) Mascha Ballhaus | 000 (yellow card)
(Kosovo) Distria Krasniqi | 100
(Spain) Ariane Toro | 000

Final
(Japan) Uta Abe | 100 (yellow card)
(Kosovo) Distria Krasniqi | 000

=== Repechage ===
Repechage
(Canada) Kelly Deguchi | 000
(Hungary) Róza Gyertyás | 010 (yellow card)
(Hungary) Réka Pupp | 000
(Japan) Kisumi Omori | 100

Bronze medal
(Hungary) Róza Gyertyás | 020
(Spain) Ariane Toro | 000
(Japan) Kisumi Omori | 000 (yellow card)
(Germany) Mascha Ballhaus | 100 (yellow card)

=== Pool A ===
First round
(Azerbaijan) Gultaj Mammadaliyeva | 000
(Cyprus) Sofia Asvesta | 001 (yellow card)

Round of 32
(France) Amandine Buchard | 100 (yellow card)
(Indonesia) Maryam March Maharani | 000
(Cyprus) Sofia Asvesta | 000
(Japan) Uta Abe | 100
(Israel) Gefen Primo | 000 (yellow card)
(Canada) Kelly Deguchi | 001
(India) Shraddha Kadubal Chopade | 000 (yellow card)
(Peru) Driulys Rivas | 011

Round of 16
(France) Amandine Buchard | 000
(Japan) Uta Abe | 100
(Canada) Kelly Deguchi | 020
(Peru) Driulys Rivas | 000

Quarter-finals
(Japan) Uta Abe | 100
(Canada) Kelly Deguchi | 000

=== Pool B ===
First round
(Netherlands) Naomi van Krevel | 000
(Spain) Ayumi Leiva Sánchez | 001 (yellow card)

Round of 32
(Germany) Mascha Ballhaus | 101 (yellow card)
(Mexico) Paulina Martínez | 000 (yellow card)
(Uzbekistan) Sugdiyona Rafkatova | 000
(United Kingdom) Tatum Keen | 101 (yellow card)
(United Arab Emirates) Bishreltiin Khorloodoi | 000 (yellow card)
(Mongolia) Lkhagvasürengiin Sosorbaram | 001
(Spain) Ayumi Leiva Sánchez | 000
(Hungary) Róza Gyertyás | 100

Round of 16
(Germany) Mascha Ballhaus | 101 (yellow card)
(United Kingdom) Tatum Keen | 000 (yellow card)
(Mongolia) Lkhagvasürengiin Sosorbaram | 000
(Hungary) Róza Gyertyás | 100

Quarter-finals
(Germany) Mascha Ballhaus | 100
(Hungary) Róza Gyertyás | 000

=== Pool C ===
First round
(Canada) Evelyn Beaton | 100 (yellow card)
(Serbia) Nikolina Nišavić | 000

Round of 32
(Kosovo) Distria Krasniqi | 111
(Brazil) Jéssica Pereira | 000
(Puerto Rico) Francine Echevarría | 101 (yellow card)
(United States) Jenna Schurr | 000 (yellow card)
(Hungary) Réka Pupp | 100
(Canada) Evelyn Beaton | 000
(Uzbekistan) Mukhayyo Akhmatova | 100
(Israel) Ilay Hayun | 000

Round of 16
(Kosovo) Distria Krasniqi | 100
(Puerto Rico) Francine Echevarría | 000
(Hungary) Réka Pupp | 022
(Uzbekistan) Mukhayyo Akhmatova | 000

Quarter-finals
(Kosovo) Distria Krasniqi | 011
(Hungary) Réka Pupp | 000 (yellow card)

=== Pool D ===
First round

Round of 32
(Italy) Odette Giuffrida | 011
(Czech Republic) Tereza Bodnárová | 010 (yellow card)
(Morocco) Soumiya Iraoui | 000
(Spain) Ariane Toro | 102 (yellow card)
(Japan) Kisumi Omori | 100
(South Korea) Jang Se-yun | 000
(Poland) Aleksandra Kaleta | 000
(China) Zhang Yuanli | 010

Round of 16
(Italy) Odette Giuffrida | 000 (yellow card)
(Spain) Ariane Toro | 100 (yellow card)
(Japan) Kisumi Omori | 101
(China) Zhang Yuanli | 000

Quarter-finals
(Spain) Ariane Toro | 002
(Japan) Kisumi Omori | 000

== Prize money ==
The sums listed bring the total prizes awarded to €57,000 for the individual event.

| Medal | Total | Judoka | Coach |
|---|---|---|---|
| Gold | €26,000 | €20,800 | €5,200 |
| Silver | €15,000 | €12,000 | €3,000 |
| Bronze | €8,000 | €6,400 | €1,600 |
