= 2023 European Judo Championships – Women's 52 kg =

Judo competition

Judo Women's 52 kg at the 2023 European Judo Championships
- Venue: Sud de France Arena
- Location: Montpellier, France
- Date: 3 November
- Competitors: 18 from 15 nations

Medalists
gold medal	Amandine Buchard (2nd title)	France
silver medal	Distria Krasniqi	Kosovo
bronze medal	Chelsie Giles	Great Britain
bronze medal	Mascha Ballhaus	Germany

Competition at external databases
- Links: IJF • JudoInside

The women's 52 kg competition at the 2023 European Judo Championships was held on 3 November at the Sud de France Arena.

== Results ==
=== Finals ===
Semi-finals
Distria Krasniqi (KOS)	10
Odette Giuffrida (ITA)	00
Amandine Buchard (FRA)	10
Chelsie Giles (GBR)	00

Final
Distria Krasniqi (KOS)	00 (yellow card)
Amandine Buchard (FRA)	01

=== Repechage ===
Repechage
Gultaj Mammadaliyeva (AZE)	00 (yellow card)
Réka Pupp (HUN)	11 (yellow card)
Mascha Ballhaus (GER)	02 (yellow card)
Gefen Primo (ISR)	00

Bronze medal
Réka Pupp (HUN)	01
Chelsie Giles (GBR)	10
Mascha Ballhaus (GER)	10 (yellow card)
Odette Giuffrida (ITA)	00

=== Pool A ===
First round
Joana Diogo (POR)	00 (yellow card)
Sofia Asvesta (CYP)	10

Round of 16
Distria Krasniqi (KOS)	02
Ana Viktorija Puljiz (CRO)	00
Gultaj Mammadaliyeva (AZE)	10
Sofia Asvesta (CYP)	00

Quarter-finals
Distria Krasniqi (KOS)	10
Gultaj Mammadaliyeva (AZE)	00

=== Pool B ===
First round

Round of 16
Réka Pupp (HUN)	01 (yellow card)
Amber Ryheul (BEL)	00
Odette Giuffrida (ITA)	10
Ariane Toro (ESP)	01

Quarter-finals
Réka Pupp (HUN)	00
Odette Giuffrida (ITA)	10 (yellow card)

=== Pool C ===
First round
Estrella López (ESP)	00 (yellow card)
Róza Gyertyás (HUN)	01 (yellow card)

Round of 16
Amandine Buchard (FRA)	01
Aleksandra Kaleta (POL)	00 (yellow card)
Mascha Ballhaus (GER)	01 (yellow card)
Róza Gyertyás (HUN)	00

Quarter-finals
Amandine Buchard (FRA)	01 (yellow card)
Mascha Ballhaus (GER)	00 (yellow card)

=== Pool D ===
First round

Round of 16
Chelsie Giles (GBR)	10
Maria Siderot (POR)	00
Gefen Primo (ISR)	02
Gabriela Dimitrova (BUL)	00

Quarter-finals
Chelsie Giles (GBR)	02 (yellow card)
Gefen Primo (ISR)	00
