= 2024 World Judo Championships – Women's 52 kg =

Judo competition

Judo Women's 52 kg at the 2024 World Judo Championships
- Venue: Mubadala Arena
- Location: Abu Dhabi, United Arab Emirates
- Date: 19 May 2024
- Competitors: 43 from 36 nations
- Total prize money: €57,000

Medalists
gold medal	Odette Giuffrida (1st title)	Italy
silver medal	Diyora Keldiyorova	Uzbekistan
bronze medal	Amandine Buchard	France
bronze medal	Mascha Ballhaus	Germany

Competition at external databases
- Links: IJF • JudoInside

The Women's 52 kg event at the 2024 World Judo Championships was held at the Mubadala Arena in Abu Dhabi, United Arab Emirates on 19 May 2024.

== Results ==
=== Finals ===
Semi-finals
(Uzbekistan) Diyora Keldiyorova	10
(Japan) Hibiki Shiraishi	00
(France) Amandine Buchard	00
(Italy) Odette Giuffrida	10

Final
(Uzbekistan) Diyora Keldiyorova	00 (yellow card)
(Italy) Odette Giuffrida	01 (yellow card)

=== Repechage ===
Repechage
(Switzerland) Binta Ndiaye	00 (yellow card)
(Hungary) Réka Pupp	11 (yellow card)
(Germany) Mascha Ballhaus	10
(Brazil) Larissa Pimenta	00

Bronze medal
(Hungary) Réka Pupp	00 (yellow card)
(France) Amandine Buchard	01
(Germany) Mascha Ballhaus	01
(Japan) Hibiki Shiraishi	00 (yellow card)

=== Pool A ===
First round
(Indonesia) Maryam March Maharani	00
(Mexico) Paulina Martínez	10 (yellow card)
(Switzerland) Binta Ndiaye	10
(Morocco) Soumiya Iraoui	00

Round of 32
(Uzbekistan) Diyora Keldiyorova	10 (yellow card)
(Croatia) Ana Viktorija Puljiz	00
(Mexico) Paulina Martínez	00 (yellow card)
(Argentina) Sofía Fiora	10
(United Arab Emirates) Bishreltiin Khorloodoi	02 (yellow card)
(South Korea) Jang Se-yun	00
(Switzerland) Binta Ndiaye	02
(Bulgaria) Gabriela Dimitrova	00

Round of 16
(Uzbekistan) Diyora Keldiyorova	02
(Argentina) Sofía Fiora	00 (yellow card)
(United Arab Emirates) Bishreltiin Khorloodoi	00 (yellow card)
(Switzerland) Binta Ndiaye	01

Quarter-finals
(Uzbekistan) Diyora Keldiyorova	10
(Switzerland) Binta Ndiaye	00

=== Pool B ===
First round
(Spain) Ariane Toro	01
(Mongolia) Lkhagvasürengiin Sosorbaram	00 (yellow card)
(Cyprus) Sofia Asvesta	02
(Mozambique) Jacira Ferreira	00
Alesya Kuznetsova	00
(Australia) Tinka Easton	10

Round of 32
(Israel) Gefen Primo	00
(Spain) Ariane Toro	10
(Japan) Hibiki Shiraishi	10
(Cuba) Aleanny Carbonell	00
(Hungary) Réka Pupp	01 (yellow card)
(Cyprus) Sofia Asvesta	00
(Australia) Tinka Easton	01 (yellow card)
(Chinese Taipei) Shen Yi-hsi	00

Round of 16
(Spain) Ariane Toro	00
(Japan) Hibiki Shiraishi	10 (yellow card)
(Hungary) Réka Pupp	11
(Australia) Tinka Easton	00

Quarter-finals
(Japan) Hibiki Shiraishi	01 (yellow card)
(Hungary) Réka Pupp	00 (yellow card)

=== Pool C ===
First round
(Portugal) Maria Siderot	01 (yellow card)
(Canada) Kelly Deguchi	00
(Belgium) Amber Ryheul	10
(India) Shraddha Kadubal Chopade	00
(Switzerland) Fabienne Kocher	10 (yellow card)
Glafira Borisova	00

Round of 32
(France) Amandine Buchard	10 (yellow card)
(Portugal) Maria Siderot	00
(Hungary) Róza Gyertyás	10
(Netherlands) Naomi van Krevel	00
(Germany) Mascha Ballhaus	10 (yellow card)
(Belgium) Amber Ryheul	00
(Switzerland) Fabienne Kocher	01
(South Korea) Jung Ye-rin	00

Round of 16
(France) Amandine Buchard	02
(Hungary) Róza Gyertyás	00 (yellow card)
(Germany) Mascha Ballhaus	10 (yellow card)
(Switzerland) Fabienne Kocher	00

Quarter-finals
(France) Amandine Buchard	10
(Germany) Mascha Ballhaus	00

=== Pool D ===
First round
(Spain) Estrella López Sheriff	10 (yellow card)
(China) Zhu Yeqing	00
(Japan) Kisumi Omori	02 (yellow card)
(Panama) Lilian Cordones	00
(United States) Angelica Delgado	02
(Poland) Aleksandra Kaleta	01

Round of 32
(Italy) Odette Giuffrida	11 (yellow card)
(Spain) Estrella López Sheriff	00
(Japan) Kisumi Omori	02
(Uzbekistan) Sita Kadamboeva	00
(Brazil) Larissa Pimenta	02 (yellow card)
(Cameroon) Marie Céline Baba Matia	00
(United States) Angelica Delgado	02
(Cape Verde) Djamila Silva	00 (yellow card)

Round of 16
(Italy) Odette Giuffrida	01
(Japan) Kisumi Omori	00 (yellow card)
(Brazil) Larissa Pimenta	10
(United States) Angelica Delgado	00

Quarter-finals
(Italy) Odette Giuffrida	10 (yellow card)
(Brazil) Larissa Pimenta	00

== Prize money ==
The sums listed bring the total prizes awarded to €57,000 for the individual event.

Medal	Total	Judoka	Coach
Gold	€26,000	€20,800	€5,200
Silver	€15,000	€12,000	€3,000
Bronze	€8,000	€6,400	€1,600
