= 2026 European Judo Championships – Women's 52 kg =

Judo competition

Judo Women's 52 kg at the 2026 European Judo Championships
- Venue: Olympic Palace
- Location: Tbilisi, Georgia
- Date: 16 April 2026
- Competitors: 24 from 19 nations

Medalists
gold medal	Distria Krasniqi (3rd title)	Kosovo
silver medal	Amandine Buchard	France
bronze medal	Ariane Toro	Spain
bronze medal	Odette Giuffrida	Italy

Competition at external databases
- Links: IJF • JudoInside

The women's 52 kg event at the 2026 European Judo Championships was held at the Olympic Palace in Tbilisi, Georgia on 16 April 2026.

== Results ==
=== Finals ===
Semi-finals
(Kosovo) Distria Krasniqi	001 (yellow card)
(Italy) Odette Giuffrida	000
(Spain) Ariane Toro	000 (yellow card)
(France) Amandine Buchard	001 (yellow card)

Final
(Kosovo) Distria Krasniqi	001
(France) Amandine Buchard	000

=== Repechage ===
Repechage
(Poland) Aleksandra Kaleta	000
(Netherlands) Naomi van Krevel	100
(Hungary) Réka Pupp	010
(Hungary) Róza Gyertyás	000 (yellow card)

Bronze medal
(Netherlands) Naomi van Krevel	000
(Spain) Ariane Toro	110
(Hungary) Réka Pupp	000
(Italy) Odette Giuffrida	001 (yellow card)

=== Pool A ===
First round
(Czech Republic) Tereza Bodnárová	021 (yellow card)
(Portugal) Maria Siderot	011
(Poland) Aleksandra Kaleta	110
(United Kingdom) Tatum Keen	000

Round of 16
(Kosovo) Distria Krasniqi	010 (yellow card)
(Czech Republic) Tereza Bodnárová	000
(Israel) Gefen Primo	000
(Poland) Aleksandra Kaleta	100

Quarter-finals
(Kosovo) Distria Krasniqi	010 (yellow card)
(Poland) Aleksandra Kaleta	000 (yellow card)

=== Pool B ===
First round
(Cyprus) Sofia Asvesta	000
(Netherlands) Naomi van Krevel	100 (yellow card)
(Azerbaijan) Leyla Aliyeva	w/o
~~(Serbia) Nikolina Nišavić~~

Round of 16
(Spain) Ayumi Leiva Sánchez	000
(Netherlands) Naomi van Krevel	100
(Italy) Odette Giuffrida	100 (yellow card)
(Azerbaijan) Leyla Aliyeva	000

Quarter-finals
(Netherlands) Naomi van Krevel	000
(Italy) Odette Giuffrida	001 (yellow card)

=== Pool C ===
First round
(Luxembourg) Carla Tavares Fernandes	000 (yellow card)
(Azerbaijan) Gultaj Mammadaliyeva	100
(Kosovo) Fatjona Kasapi	001 (yellow card)
(Bulgaria) Gabriela Dimitrova	000

Round of 16
(Hungary) Réka Pupp	100
(Azerbaijan) Gultaj Mammadaliyeva	000
(Spain) Ariane Toro	102 (yellow card)
(Kosovo) Fatjona Kasapi	000 (yellow card)

Quarter-finals
(Hungary) Réka Pupp	000
(Spain) Ariane Toro	010 (yellow card)

=== Pool D ===
First round
(Georgia (country)) Nino Tatrishvili	w/o
~~(Estonia) Darja Mihhailova~~
(Russia) Liliia Nugaeva	020
(Poland) Barbara Twarowska	000

Round of 16
(Hungary) Róza Gyertyás	100
(Georgia (country)) Nino Tatrishvili	000
(France) Amandine Buchard	010 (yellow card)
(Russia) Liliia Nugaeva	000 (yellow card)

Quarter-finals
(Hungary) Róza Gyertyás	000 (yellow card)
(France) Amandine Buchard	001
