= 2026 World Judo Championships – Women's 52 kg =

Judo competition

Judo Women's 52 kg at the 2026 World Judo Championships
- Venue: National Gymnastics Arena
- Location: Baku, Azerbaijan
- Date: 5 October 2026
- Competitors: 37 from 30 nations
- Total prize money: €57,000

Medalists
gold medal	Uta Abe (6th title)	Japan
silver medal	Ariane Toro	Spain
bronze medal	Ayumi Leiva Sánchez	Spain
bronze medal	Odette Giuffrida	Italy

Competition at external databases
- Links: IJF

The women's 52 kg event at the 2026 World Judo Championships was held at the National Gymnastics Arena in Baku, Azerbaijan on 5 October 2026.

== Results ==
=== Finals ===
Semi-finals
(Italy) Odette Giuffrida	000
(Spain) Ariane Toro	100
(Spain) Ayumi Leiva Sánchez	000
(Japan) Uta Abe	110 (yellow card)

Final
(Spain) Ariane Toro	000
(Japan) Uta Abe	100

=== Repechage ===
Repechage
(Azerbaijan) Gultaj Mammadaliyeva	000
(Mongolia) Bayanmönkhiin Uranzayaa	001 (yellow card)
(Hungary) Róza Gyertyás	000
(Germany) Mascha Ballhaus	010 (yellow card)

Bronze medal
(Mongolia) Bayanmönkhiin Uranzayaa	000
(Spain) Ayumi Leiva Sánchez	100
(Germany) Mascha Ballhaus	000 (yellow card)
(Italy) Odette Giuffrida	101 (yellow card)

=== Pool A ===
First round
(Brazil) Rafaela Rodrigues	100
(South Korea) Kim Min-jeong	000

Round of 32
(Italy) Odette Giuffrida	100
(Brazil) Rafaela Rodrigues	000
(Morocco) Soumiya Iraoui	100
(Puerto Rico) Francine Echevarría	000 (yellow card)
(Israel) Gefen Primo	001 (yellow card)
(Azerbaijan) Gultaj Mammadaliyeva	010 (yellow card)
(Australia) Tinka Easton	100
(Peru) Driulys Rivas	000

Round of 16
(Italy) Odette Giuffrida	001
(Morocco) Soumiya Iraoui	000
(Azerbaijan) Gultaj Mammadaliyeva	001 (yellow card)
(Australia) Tinka Easton	000

Quarter-finals
(Italy) Odette Giuffrida	102
(Azerbaijan) Gultaj Mammadaliyeva	000

=== Pool B ===
First round
(Bulgaria) Gabriela Dimitrova	010
(India) Shraddha Kadubal Chopade	000
(Hungary) Réka Pupp	020
(Hong Kong) Tsui Shuk-ki	000

Round of 32
(Spain) Ariane Toro	110
(Bulgaria) Gabriela Dimitrova	000
(United States) Toni Pepia	000
(Uzbekistan) Sugdiyona Rafkatova	100
(United Arab Emirates) Bishreltiin Khorloodoi	000
(Hungary) Réka Pupp	100
(Canada) Evelyn Beaton	000
(Mongolia) Bayanmönkhiin Uranzayaa	001

Round of 16
(Spain) Ariane Toro	002 (yellow card)
(Uzbekistan) Sugdiyona Rafkatova	001
(Hungary) Réka Pupp	000
(Mongolia) Bayanmönkhiin Uranzayaa	100

Quarter-finals
(Spain) Ariane Toro	100
(Mongolia) Bayanmönkhiin Uranzayaa	000

=== Pool C ===
First round
(Niger) Zalika Hassane Abdou	000
(Cyprus) Sofia Asvesta	001 (yellow card)

Round of 32
(Spain) Ayumi Leiva Sánchez	100
(India) Nungshithoi Chanu Leishangthem	000
(Cameroon) Marie Céline Baba Matia	010
(Tajikistan) Madina Qurbonzoda	001 (yellow card)
(Hungary) Róza Gyertyás	021 (yellow card)
(Serbia) Nikolina Nišavić	000
(Cyprus) Sofia Asvesta	100 (yellow card)
(United States) Monica Reyes	000

Round of 16
(Spain) Ayumi Leiva Sánchez	100 (yellow card)
(Cameroon) Marie Céline Baba Matia	000
(Hungary) Róza Gyertyás	100
(Cyprus) Sofia Asvesta	000 (yellow card)

Quarter-finals
(Spain) Ayumi Leiva Sánchez	100 (yellow card)
(Hungary) Róza Gyertyás	000 (yellow card)

=== Pool D ===
First round
(Czech Republic) Tereza Bodnárová	101 (yellow card)
(Netherlands) Naomi van Krevel	000

Round of 32
(Germany) Mascha Ballhaus	001
(Croatia) Tihea Topolovec	000 (yellow card)
(Mongolia) Myagmarsürengiin Nandin-Erdene	100 (yellow card)
(South Korea) Hwang Sur-yeon	000
(Japan) Uta Abe	011
(Brazil) Larissa Pimenta	000
(Czech Republic) Tereza Bodnárová	101
(Poland) Aleksandra Kaleta	001 (yellow card)

Round of 16
(Germany) Mascha Ballhaus	002
(Mongolia) Myagmarsürengiin Nandin-Erdene	000
(Japan) Uta Abe	010
(Czech Republic) Tereza Bodnárová	000 (yellow card)

Quarter-finals
(Germany) Mascha Ballhaus	010
(Japan) Uta Abe	100

== Prize money ==
The sums listed bring the total prizes awarded to €57,000 for the individual event.

Medal	Total	Judoka	Coach
Gold	€26,000	€20,800	€5,200
Silver	€15,000	€12,000	€3,000
Bronze	€8,000	€6,400	€1,600
