= 2025 European Judo Championships – Women's 52 kg =

Judo competition

Judo Women's 52 kg at the 2025 European Judo Championships
- Venue: Morača Sports Center
- Location: Podgorica, Montenegro
- Date: 23 April 2025
- Competitors: 24 from 17 nations

Medalists
gold medal	Distria Krasniqi (2nd title)	Kosovo
silver medal	Odette Giuffrida	Italy
bronze medal	Naomi van Krevel	Netherlands
bronze medal	Ariane Toro	Spain

Competition at external databases
- Links: IJF • JudoInside

The women's 52 kg competition at the 2025 European Judo Championships was held at the Morača Sports Center in Podgorica, Montenegro on 23 April 2025.

== Results ==
=== Finals ===
Semi-finals
(Kosovo) Distria Krasniqi	100 (yellow card)
(Spain) Ariane Toro	000 (yellow card)
(Italy) Odette Giuffrida	010 (yellow card)
(Israel) Gefen Primo	000 (yellow card)

Final
(Kosovo) Distria Krasniqi	002
(Italy) Odette Giuffrida	000 (yellow card)

=== Repechage ===
Repechage
(Netherlands) Naomi van Krevel	100 (yellow card)
(Hungary) Réka Pupp	000 (yellow card)
(Hungary) Róza Gyertyás	001 (yellow card)
(Spain) Ayumi Leiva Sánchez	000 (yellow card)

Bronze medal
(Netherlands) Naomi van Krevel	100 (yellow card)
(Israel) Gefen Primo	000
(Hungary) Róza Gyertyás	000
(Spain) Ariane Toro	021 (yellow card)

=== Pool A ===
First round
(Serbia) Milica Nikolić	001
(International Judo Federation) Karina Efimova	000 (yellow card)
(Germany) Chiara Serra	100
(Azerbaijan) Gultaj Mammadaliyeva	000 (yellow card)

Round of 16
(Kosovo) Distria Krasniqi	100
(Serbia) Milica Nikolić	000
(Netherlands) Naomi van Krevel	010
(Germany) Chiara Serra	000 (yellow card)

Quarter-finals
(Kosovo) Distria Krasniqi	101
(Netherlands) Naomi van Krevel	000

=== Pool B ===
First round
(Israel) Ilay Hayun	100 (yellow card)
(United Kingdom) Tatum Keen	000
(Poland) Kinga Klimczak	000
(Cyprus) Sofia Asvesta	001 (yellow card)

Round of 16
(Hungary) Réka Pupp	100 (yellow card)
(Israel) Ilay Hayun	000
(Spain) Ariane Toro	100
(Cyprus) Sofia Asvesta	000

Quarter-finals
(Hungary) Réka Pupp	000 (yellow card)
(Spain) Ariane Toro	001 (yellow card)

=== Pool C ===
First round
(Portugal) Raquel Brito	100 (yellow card)
(Kosovo) Laurine Gashi	000
(Poland) Aleksandra Kaleta	100
(Estonia) Darja Mihhailova	000

Round of 16
(Italy) Odette Giuffrida	010
(Portugal) Raquel Brito	000 (yellow card)
(Hungary) Róza Gyertyás	001 (yellow card)
(Poland) Aleksandra Kaleta	000 (yellow card)

Quarter-finals
(Italy) Odette Giuffrida	010 (yellow card)
(Hungary) Róza Gyertyás	000 (yellow card)

=== Pool D ===
First round
(Turkey) Buketnur Karabulut	100 (yellow card)
(Serbia) Nikolina Nišavić	000 (yellow card)
(International Judo Federation) Hanna Burakova	001 (yellow card)
(Bulgaria) Gabriela Dimitrova	000

Round of 16
(Israel) Gefen Primo	100
(Turkey) Buketnur Karabulut	000
(Spain) Ayumi Leiva Sánchez	100
(International Judo Federation) Hanna Burakova	000

Quarter-finals
(Israel) Gefen Primo	010
(Spain) Ayumi Leiva Sánchez	000
