= 2021 European Judo Championships – Women's 52 kg =

Judo Women's 52 kg at the 2021 European Judo Championships
- Venue: Altice Arena
- Location: Lisbon, Portugal
- Date: 16 April
- Competitors: 26 from 18 nations

Medalists
gold medal	Amandine Buchard (1st title)	France
silver medal	Odette Giuffrida	Italy
bronze medal	Gefen Primo	Israel
bronze medal	Réka Pupp	Hungary

Competition at external databases
- Links: IJF • JudoInside

The women's 52 kg competition at the 2021 European Judo Championships was held on 16 April at the Altice Arena.

== Results ==
=== Final ===
Final
Amandine Buchard (FRA)	11
Odette Giuffrida (ITA)	00

=== Repechage ===
Repechage
Fabienne Kocher (SUI)	01
Evelyne Tschopp (SUI)	10

Third place
Evelyne Tschopp (SUI)	01
Gefen Primo (ISR)	10

Repechage
Réka Pupp (HUN)	01
Gili Cohen (ISR)	00

Third place
Réka Pupp (HUN)	10
Ana Pérez (ESP)	01

=== Top half ===
Round of 32
Annika Würfel (GER)	00
Andreea Chițu (ROU)	11
Fabienne Kocher (SUI)	10
Aleksandra Kaleta (POL)	00
Mariam Janashvili (GEO)	10
Joana Diogo (POR)	00
İrem Korkmaz (TUR)	00
Martina Castagnola (ITA)	10
Sofia Asvesta (CYP)	01
Cristina Blanaru (MDA)	10

Round of 16
Amandine Buchard (FRA)	01
Andreea Chițu (ROU)	00
Fabienne Kocher (SUI)	01
Mariam Janashvili (GEO)	00
Ana Pérez (ESP)	11
Martina Castagnola (ITA)	00
Evelyne Tschopp (SUI)	01
Cristina Blanaru (MDA)	00

Quarterfinals
Amandine Buchard (FRA)	10
Fabienne Kocher (SUI)	00
Ana Pérez (ESP)	11
Evelyne Tschopp (SUI)	01

Semifinals
Amandine Buchard (FRA)	10
Ana Pérez (ESP)	00

=== Bottom half ===
Round of 32
Joana Ramos (POR)	10
Tetiana Levytska-Shukvani (GEO)	00
Réka Pupp (HUN)	11
Ana Viktorija Puljiz (CRO)	00
Teja Tropan (SLO)	00
Amber Ryheul (BEL)	10
Mascha Ballhaus (GER)	01
Agata Perenc (POL)	00
Naomi van Krevel (NED)	00
Estrella López (ESP)	01

Round of 16
Odette Giuffrida (ITA)	10
Joana Ramos (POR)	00
Réka Pupp (HUN)	10
Amber Ryheul (BEL)	00
Gili Cohen (ISR)	10
Mascha Ballhaus (GER)	00
Gefen Primo (ISR)	10
Estrella López (ESP)	00

Quarterfinals
Odette Giuffrida (ITA)	10
Réka Pupp (HUN)	00
Gili Cohen (ISR)	01
Gefen Primo (ISR)	10

Semifinals
Odette Giuffrida (ITA)	01
Gefen Primo (ISR)	00
