= 2024 European Judo Championships – Women's 52 kg =

Judo competition

Judo Women's 52 kg at the 2024 European Judo Championships
- Venue: Arena Zagreb
- Location: Zagreb, Croatia
- Date: 25 April
- Competitors: 20 from 17 nations

Medalists
| gold medal | Distria Krasniqi (1st title) | Kosovo |
| silver medal | Odette Giuffrida | Italy |
| bronze medal | Ariane Toro | Spain |
| bronze medal | Réka Pupp | Hungary |

Competition at external databases
- Links: IJF • JudoInside

The women's 52 kg competition at the 2024 European Judo Championships was held on 25 April at the Arena Zagreb.

== Results ==
=== Finals ===
Semi-finals
Distria Krasniqi (KOS) | 11
Ariane Toro (ESP) | 00
Odette Giuffrida (ITA) | 10
Réka Pupp (HUN) | 00

Final
Distria Krasniqi (KOS) | 01
Odette Giuffrida (ITA) | 00

=== Repechage ===
Repechage
Ana Viktorija Puljiz (CRO) | 00
Aydan Valiyeva (AZE) | 01
Sofia Asvesta (CYP) | 01
Astride Gneto (FRA) | 00

Bronze medal
Aydan Valiyeva (AZE) | 00
Ariane Toro (ESP) | 02
Sofia Asvesta (CYP) | 00
Réka Pupp (HUN) | 02

=== Pool A ===
First round
Maria Siderot (POR) | 00
Róza Gyertyás (HUN) | 10 (yellow card)

Round of 16
Distria Krasniqi (KOS) | 11
Anna Borodina (UKR) | 00 (yellow card)
Ana Viktorija Puljiz (CRO) | 02
Róza Gyertyás (HUN) | 00

Quarter-finals
Distria Krasniqi (KOS) | 10 (yellow card)
Ana Viktorija Puljiz (CRO) | 00 (yellow card)

=== Pool B ===
First round
Naomi van Krevel (NED) | 01
Amber Ryheul (BEL) | 00

Round of 16
Gefen Primo (ISR) | 00
Aydan Valiyeva (AZE) | 02
Ariane Toro (ESP) | 02
Naomi van Krevel (NED) | 01 (yellow card)

Quarter-finals
Aydan Valiyeva (AZE) | 00
Ariane Toro (ESP) | 01

=== Pool C ===
First round
Gabriela Dimitrova (BUL) | 00
Sofia Asvesta (CYP) | 10 (yellow card)

Round of 16
Odette Giuffrida (ITA) | 01 (yellow card)
Glafira Borisova (AIN) | 00
Gultaj Mammadaliyeva (AZE) | 00
Sofia Asvesta (CYP) | 01

Quarter-finals
Odette Giuffrida (ITA) | 10
Sofia Asvesta (CYP) | 00

=== Pool D ===
First round
Estrella López Sheriff (ESP) | 00
Carina Klaus-Sternwieser (AUT) | 01

Round of 16
Réka Pupp (HUN) | 02 (yellow card)
Nikolina Nišavić (SRB) | 00 (yellow card)
Astride Gneto (FRA) | 10
Carina Klaus-Sternwieser (AUT) | 00

Quarter-finals
Réka Pupp (HUN) | 10
Astride Gneto (FRA) | 00 (yellow card)
