= 2020 European Judo Championships – Women's 52 kg =

Judo competition

Judo Women's 52 kg at the 2020 European Judo Championships
- Venue: O2 Arena
- Location: Prague, Czech Republic
- Date: 19 November
- Competitors: 24 from 19 nations

Medalists
gold medal	Odette Giuffrida (1st title)	Italy
silver medal	Andreea Chițu	Romania
bronze medal	Charline Van Snick	Belgium
bronze medal	Estrella López Sheriff	Spain

Competition at external databases
- Links: IJF • JudoInside

The women's 52 kg competition at the 2020 European Judo Championships was held on 19 November at the O2 Arena.

== Results ==
=== Final ===
Final
Odette Giuffrida (ITA)	01
Andreea Chițu (ROU)	00

=== Repechage ===
Repechage
Fabienne Kocher (SUI)	00
Charline Van Snick (BEL)	01

Third place
Charline Van Snick (BEL)	10
Ana Pérez (ESP)	00

Repechage
Natalia Kuziutina (RUS)	10
Astride Gneto (FRA)	00

Third place
Natalia Kuziutina (RUS)	00
Estrella López Sheriff (ESP)	01

=== Top half ===
Round of 32
Karolina Pieńkowska (POL)	01
Alexandra Pop (ROU)	00
Réka Pupp (HUN)	10
Cristina Blanaru (MDA)	00
Nadežda Petrović (SRB)	00
Estrella López Sheriff (ESP)	10
Joana Ramos (POR)	00
Anna Borodina (UKR)	10

Round of 16
Odette Giuffrida (ITA)	11
Karolina Pieńkowska (POL)	00
Fabienne Kocher (SUI)	01
Réka Pupp (HUN)	00
Evelyne Tschopp (SUI)	00
Estrella López Sheriff (ESP)	01
Charline Van Snick (BEL)	10
Anna Borodina (UKR)	00

Quarterfinals
Odette Giuffrida (ITA)	01
Fabienne Kocher (SUI)	00
Estrella López Sheriff (ESP)	01
Charline Van Snick (BEL)	00

Semifinals
Odette Giuffrida (ITA)	10
Estrella López Sheriff (ESP)	00

=== Bottom half ===
Round of 32
Naomi van Krevel (NED)	10
Kseniya Danilovich (BLR)	01
Amber Ryheul (BEL)	10
İrem Korkmaz (TUR)	00
Gultaj Mammadaliyeva (AZE)	00
Tetiana Levytska-Shukvani (GEO)	10
Nathalie Rouviere (GER)	00
Aleksandra Kaleta (POL)	10

Round of 16
Natalia Kuziutina (RUS)	11
Naomi van Krevel (NED)	00
Andreea Chițu (ROU)	01
Amber Ryheul (BEL)	00
Ana Pérez (ESP)	11
Tetiana Levytska-Shukvani (GEO)	00
Astride Gneto (FRA)	10
Aleksandra Kaleta (POL)	00

Quarterfinals
Natalia Kuziutina (RUS)	00
Andreea Chițu (ROU)	10
Ana Pérez (ESP)	10
Astride Gneto (FRA)	00

Semifinals
Andreea Chițu (ROU)	10
Ana Pérez (ESP)	00
