= Judo at the 2018 Mediterranean Games – Women's 52 kg =

Judo competitions

Women's 52 kg at the 2018 Mediterranean Games
- Venue: Cambrils Pavilion
- Date: 27 June
- Competitors: 12 from 12 nations

Medalists
gold medal	Distria Krasniqi	Kosovo
silver medal	Odette Giuffrida	Italy
bronze medal	Astride Gneto	France
bronze medal	İrem Korkmaz	Turkey

The women's 52 kg competition in judo at the 2018 Mediterranean Games was held on 27 June at the Cambrils Pavilion in Cambrils.

== Schedule ==
All times are Central European Summer Time (UTC+2).

Date	Time	Round
June 27, 2018	10:00	Round of 16
June 27, 2018	11:20	Quarterfinals
June 27, 2018	12:40	Semifinals
June 27, 2018	13:44	Repechage
June 27, 2018	17:32	Bronze medal
June 27, 2018	17:40	Final

== Results ==
=== Main Round ===
Round of 16
Ana Perez Box (ESP)	10
Arbresha Rexhepi (MKD)	00
Meriem Moussa (ALG)	10
Alda Babi (AND)	00
Fatima Zahra El Qorachi (MAR)	00
Andrea Stojadinov (SRB)	10
Odette Giuffrida (ITA)	11
Mariana Esteves (POR)	00

Quarterfinals
Distria Krasniqi (KOS)	10
Ana Perez Box (ESP)	00
İrem Korkmaz (TUR)	01
Meriem Moussa (ALG)	00
Astride Gneto (FRA)	10
Andrea Stojadinov (SRB)	00
Anja Štangar (SLO)	00
Odette Giuffrida (ITA)	01

Semifinals
Distria Krasniqi (KOS)	10
İrem Korkmaz (TUR)	00
Astride Gneto (FRA)	00
Odette Giuffrida (ITA)	10

Final
Distria Krasniqi (KOS)	01
Odette Giuffrida (ITA)	00

=== Repechage ===
Repechage 1	Repechage 2		Bronze medal
	Ana Perez Box (ESP)	10
	Meriem Moussa (ALG)	00
			Ana Perez Box (ESP)	00
			Astride Gneto (FRA)	01

Repechage 1		Repechage 2		Bronze medal
		Andrea Stojadinov (SRB)	00
Mariana Esteves (POR)	00	Anja Štangar (SLO)	10
Anja Štangar (SLO)	10			Anja Štangar (SLO)	00
				İrem Korkmaz (TUR)	10
