= Raul Villamarin Rodriguez =

Vice President of Woxsen University

- Education: University of St. Thomas (Postdoctoral Research) Universidad de San Miguel (PhD) Universidad Isabel I de Castilla (MBA and Master's in Big Data) St. Xavier's College (BA)
- Occupation: Vice President
- Organization: Woxsen University
- Honours: Sir Cary Cooper Professorship in Organisational Behaviour Poets&Quants Best 40 Under 40 Business Professors (2026) Europe India 40 under 40 Leader Steven Pinker Professorship in Cognitive Psychology Classavo Chair Professorship in Integrative Research and Digital Learning
- Website: https://www.raulvrodriguez.in

Dr. Raul Villamarin Rodriguez is the Vice President of Woxsen University in India and a prominent Cognitive Technologist. He holds advisory positions on several international academic and corporate boards, including IBS Ranepa, PUCPR, Johannesburg Business School, Milpark Business School, PetThinQ Inc, and SpaceBasic Inc. Dr. Rodriguez is a Visiting Professor at Universidad del Rosario, an Expert at UNESCO, and an Editorial Board member at World Summit AI.

Recognized for his expertise in the convergence of cognitive psychology and advanced technologies, he has received numerous accolades, including the Steven Pinker Professorship in Cognitive Psychology and the Classavo Chair Professorship in Integrative Research and Digital Learning.

Rodriguez continues to influence the fields of psychology, technology, and education through his research, publications, and contributions to various conferences and councils.

== Early life and education ==
Dr. Raul Villamarin Rodriguez was born in Pontevedra, Spain. He attended St. Xavier’s College, Mumbai, earning a Bachelor's degree in Arts (BA) in Psychology and Sociology. He completed his Master of Business Administration in Tech-induced HR and a Master’s in Big Data, both from Universidad Isabel I de Castilla, Spain. Additionally, he holds a Doctor of Philosophy (Ph.D.) in Human-Centered AI (Cognitive Psychology and Technology) from Universidad de San Miguel. In 2026, he undertook postdoctoral research at the University of St. Thomas, focusing on behavioral mapping and cognitive risk assessment in aviation.
