= Judo at the 2026 Commonwealth Games – Women's 52 kg =

Judo competition

Judo – Women's 52 kg at the 2026 Commonwealth Games
- Venue: SEC Centre, Glasgow
- Date: 31 July 2026
- Competitors: 12 from 12 nations

Medalists
| gold medal | Evelyn Beaton | Canada |
| silver medal | Sofia Asvesta | Cyprus |
| bronze medal | Tatum Keen | England |
| bronze medal | Marie-Céline Baba Matia | Cameroon |

The Women's 52 kg judo competitions at the 2026 Commonwealth Games in Glasgow, Scotland will place on 31 July at the SEC Centre. Twelve judoka, representing twelve nations, entered this class.

== Seedings ==
The following judoka were seeded in advance of the draw:

Women's 52 kg
| Seed | Judoka | Nation |
|---|---|---|
| 1 | Evelyn Beaton | Canada |
| 2 | Sofia Asvesta | Cyprus |
| 3 | Tatum Keen | England |
| 4 | Tinka Easton | Australia |
| 5 | Shraddha Chopade | India |
| 6 | Marie Baba Matia | Cameroon |
| 7 | Marie Sylva Rioux | Mauritius |
| 8 | Lola Hodson | Wales |

== Results ==
=== Gold final path ===
Round of 16
Lola Hodson (WAL) | 100
Priscillia Monthouel (VAN) | 000
Shrradha Chopade (IND) | w/o
~~Jane Massaquoi (SLE)~~ | DNS
Marie Sylva Rioux (MRI) | 100
Pemphero Tayali (MAW) | 000
Marie-Céline Baba Matia (CMR) | 100 (yellow card)
Cinthya Badru (MOZ) | 000

Quarterfinals
Evelyn Beaton (CAN) | 100
Lola Hodson (WAL) | 000
Tinka Easton (AUS) | 001
Shrradha Chopade (IND) | 000
Tatum Keen (ENG) | 100
Marie Sylva Rioux (MRI) | 000 (yellow card)
Sofia Asvesta (CYP) | 100 (yellow card)
Marie-Céline Baba Matia (CMR) | 001

Semifinal
Evelyn Beaton (CAN) | 001
Tinka Easton (AUS) | 000 (yellow card)
Tatum Keen (ENG) | 000
Sofia Asvesta (CYP) | 001

Gold medal final
Evelyn Beaton (CAN) | 001
Sofia Asvesta (CYP) | 000

=== Repechage/bronze medal path ===
Competitors who are eliminated by either of the finalists enter the repechage to contest for the bronze medals.

Repechage
Lola Hodson (WAL) | 001
Shrradha Chopade (IND) | 000
Marie Sylva Rioux (MRI) | 000
Marie-Céline Baba Matia (CMR) | 100

Bronze medal
Lola Hodson (WAL) | 000
Tatum Keen (ENG) | 100 (yellow card)
Marie-Céline Baba Matia (CMR) | 100 (yellow card)
Tinka Easton (AUS) | 000
