= Judo at the 2022 Mediterranean Games – Women's 52 kg =

Judo competitions

Judo Women's 52 kg at the 2022 Mediterranean Games
- Venue: Mohammed Ben Ahmed Convention Centre – Hall 03 and 06
- Location: Oran, Algeria
- Date: 29 June
- Competitors: 11 from 11 nations

Medalists
gold medal	Distria Krasniqi	Kosovo
silver medal	Ana Viktorija Puljiz	Croatia
bronze medal	Chloé Devictor	France
bronze medal	Ana Pérez	Spain

The women's 52 kg competition in judo at the 2022 Mediterranean Games was held on 29 June at the Mohammed Ben Ahmed Convention Centre in Oran.

== Results ==
=== Main bracket ===
Round of 16
Sofia Asvesta (CYP)	11
Buketnur Karabulut (TUR)	00
Nadežda Petrović (SRB)	10
Francesca Giorda (ITA)	00
Faïza Aissahine (ALG)	01
Anja Štangar (SLO)	00

Quarterfinals
Distria Krasniqi (KOS)	01
Sofia Asvesta (CYP)	00
Ana Pérez (ESP)	10
Chloé Devictor (FRA)	00
Soumiya Iraoui (MAR)	01
Nadežda Petrović (SRB)	00
Ana Viktorija Puljiz (CRO)	10
Faïza Aissahine (ALG)	00

Semifinals
Distria Krasniqi (KOS)	01
Ana Pérez (ESP)	00
Soumiya Iraoui (MAR)	00
Ana Viktorija Puljiz (CRO)	01

Final
Distria Krasniqi (KOS)	11
Ana Viktorija Puljiz (CRO)	00

=== Repechage ===
Repechage
Sofia Asvesta (CYP)	00
Chloé Devictor (FRA)	10
Nadežda Petrović (SRB)	00
Faïza Aissahine (ALG)	10

Bronze medal
Chloé Devictor (FRA)	10
Soumiya Iraoui (MAR)	00
Faïza Aissahine (ALG)	00
Ana Pérez (ESP)	10
