= Judo at the 2024 Summer Olympics – Women's 52 kg =

Judo Women's 52 kg at the Games of the XXXIII Olympiad
- Venue: Grand Palais Éphémère
- Location: Paris, France
- Date: 28 July 2024
- Competitors: 26 from 26 nations
- Website: Official website

Medalists
| gold medal | Diyora Keldiyorova (1st title) | Uzbekistan |
| silver medal | Distria Krasniqi | Kosovo |
| bronze medal | Larissa Pimenta | Brazil |
| bronze medal | Amandine Buchard | France |

Competition at external databases
- Links: IJF • JudoInside

The Women's 52 kg event in Judo at the 2024 Summer Olympics was held at the Grand Palais Éphémère in Paris, France on 28 July 2024.

== Summary ==
This is the ninth appearance of the women's half lightweight category.

Uta Abe lost to eventual champion Diyora Keldiyorova, returning silver medalist Amandine Buchard lost to Keldiyorova, later, Buchard won a bronze medal by beating Réka Pupp, one of the bronze medalists, Odette Giuffrida lost to potentially silver medalist Distria Krasniqi, later, Giuffrida lost to Larissa Pimenta in the bronze medal match, and Chelsie Giles lost to potentially bronze medalist Larissa Pimenta.

== Results ==
=== Finals ===
Semi-finals
Diyora Keldiyorova (UZB) | 01
Amandine Buchard (FRA) | 00
Distria Krasniqi (KOS) | 10 (yellow card)
Odette Giuffrida (ITA) | 00

Final
Diyora Keldiyorova (UZB) | 01 (yellow card)
Distria Krasniqi (KOS) | 00

=== Repechage ===
Repechage
Mascha Ballhaus (GER) | 00
Larissa Pimenta (BRA) | 10 (yellow card)
Gefen Primo (ISR) | 00
Réka Pupp (HUN) | 10

Bronze medal
Larissa Pimenta (BRA) | 10
Odette Giuffrida (ITA) | 00
Réka Pupp (HUN) | 00
Amandine Buchard (FRA) | 01

=== Pool A ===
First round
Uta Abe (JPN) | 10
Kelly Deguchi (CAN) | 00
Mascha Ballhaus (GER) | 11
Paulina Martínez (MEX) | 00 (yellow card)
Bishreltiin Khorloodoi (UAE) | 10
Zhu Yeqing (CHN) | 00

Round of 16
Diyora Keldiyorova (UZB) | 10
Uta Abe (JPN) | 01 (yellow card)
Mascha Ballhaus (GER) | 11 (yellow card)
Bishreltiin Khorloodoi (UAE) | 00 (yellow card)

Quarter-finals
Diyora Keldiyorova (UZB) | 10
Mascha Ballhaus (GER) | 00

=== Pool B ===
First round
Soumiya Iraoui (MAR) | 00
Sofia Asvesta (CYP) | 01 (yellow card)
Larissa Pimenta (BRA) | 10
Djamila Silva (CPV) | 00

Round of 16
Amandine Buchard (FRA) | 10
Sofia Asvesta (CYP) | 00
Chelsie Giles (GBR) | 00
Larissa Pimenta (BRA) | 01

Quarter-finals
Amandine Buchard (FRA) | 01
Larissa Pimenta (BRA) | 00

=== Pool C ===
First round
Maryam March Maharani (INA) | 10 (yellow card)
Jacira Ferreira (MOZ) | 00 (yellow card)
Gefen Primo (ISR) | 10 (yellow card)
Jung Ye-rin (KOR) | 00 (yellow card)
Sofía Fiora (ARG) | 00 (yellow card)
Binta Ndiaye (SUI) | 10

Round of 16
Distria Krasniqi (KOS) | 10
Maryam March Maharani (INA) | 00
Gefen Primo (ISR) | 01 (yellow card)
Binta Ndiaye (SUI) | 00

Quarter-finals
Distria Krasniqi (KOS) | 10
Gefen Primo (ISR) | 00 (yellow card)

=== Pool D ===
First round
Gultaj Mammadaliyeva (AZE) | 00
Angelica Delgado (USA) | 01
Ariane Toro (ESP) | 00 (yellow card)
Lkhagvasürengiin Sosorbaram (MGL) | 10 (yellow card)

Round of 16
Odette Giuffrida (ITA) | 01
Angelica Delgado (USA) | 00
Réka Pupp (HUN) | 10
Lkhagvasürengiin Sosorbaram (MGL) | 00

Quarter-finals
Odette Giuffrida (ITA) | 01
Réka Pupp (HUN) | 00 (yellow card)
