= Tatum Keen =

British judoka (born 2002)

Personal information
- Born: 19 April 2002 (age 24)
- Occupation: Judoka

Sport
- Country: Great Britain
- Sport: Judo
- Weight class: ‍–‍52 kg

Achievements and titles
- World Champ.: R16 (2025)
- European Champ.: R32 (2025, 2026)
- Commonwealth Games: (bronze) (2026)
Medal record
Women's judo
Representing Great Britain
IJF Grand Slam
Silver medal – second place	2026 Tbilisi	‍–‍52 kg
Representing England
Commonwealth Games
Bronze medal – third place	2026 Glasgow	‍–‍52 kg

Profile at external databases
- IJF: 37052
- JudoInside.com: 102581
- Updated on 2 August 2026

Tatum Keen (born 19 April 2002) is a British judoka. She won a bronze medal at the 2026 Commonwealth Games.

== Biography ==
Keen trains at the Bradley Stoke Judo Club in Bristol, alongside international teammate Lele Nairne under coach Pete Douglas. She was a multiple-time British champion competing at the junior level.

Keen had second-place finishes at the 2025 Prague European Open and the 2026 Tbilisi Grand Slam. Selected to represent England in Judo at the 2026 Commonwealth Games in Glasgow, Scotland, she was a bronze medalist in the women's 52kg division.
