= Evelyn Beaton =

Canadian judoka (born 2004)

Personal information
- Born: 7 November 2004 (age 21)
- Occupation: Judoka

Sport
- Country: Canada
- Sport: Judo
- Weight class: ‍–‍52 kg

Achievements and titles
- World Champ.: R32 (2025)
- Pan American Champ.: (2025)
- Commonwealth Games: (gold) (2026)
Medal record
Women's judo
Representing Canada
Pan American Championships
Gold medal – first place	2025 Santiago	‍–‍52 kg
Silver medal – second place	2026 Panama City	‍–‍52 kg
Pan American Junior Championships
Gold medal – first place	2023 Calgary	‍–‍52 kg
Commonwealth Games
Gold medal – first place	2026 Glasgow	‍–‍52 kg

Profile at external databases
- IJF: 55059
- JudoInside.com: 129138
- Updated on 2 August 2026

Evelyn Beaton (born 7 November 2004) is a Canadian judoka. She won the gold medal at the 2026 Commonwealth Games in the ‍–‍52 kg division and the silver medal at the 2026 Pan American Judo Championships.

== Biography ==
The daughter of judoka Ewan Beaton, she is from Lethbridge, Alberta and trains at Lethbridge Judo Club. Her father was the Canadian team coach when she competed in September 2019 at the Cadet Judo World Championships in Almaty, Kazakhstan.

In April 2025, Beaton won the gold medal in the -52 kg final at the 2025 Pan American-Oceania Judo Championships held in Santiago, Chile.

Beaton was silver medalist in the -52kg category at the senior 2026 Pan American Judo Championships in April 2026 having faced Brazilian Larissa Pimenta in the final. She defeated defending champion Tinka Easton in the semi-final prior to winning the gold medal against Sofia Asvesta of Cyprus in the -52kg division at the 2026 Commonwealth Games in Glasgow, Scotland on 31 July 2026.
