= Ariane Toro =

Spanish judoka (born 2003)

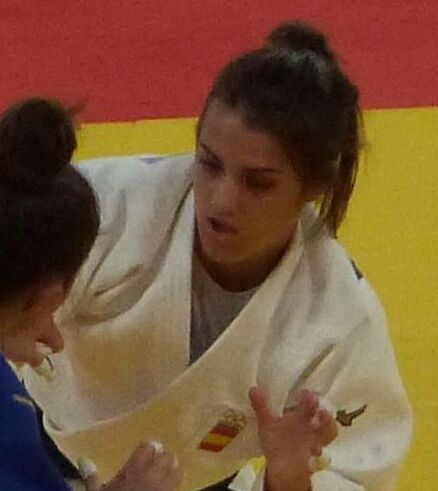

Personal information
- Full name: Ariane Toro Soler
- Born: 10 July 2003 (age 23) Bilbao, Biscay, Spain
- Education: Universidad Isabel I
- Occupation: Judoka
- Years active: 2019–present
- Relatives: Yolanda Soler (mother); José Tomás Toro (father)

Sport
- Country: Spain
- Sport: Judo
- Weight class: ‍–‍52 kg
- Club: Centro de Tecnificación de Judo Navarro

Achievements and titles
- Olympic Games: R32 (2024)
- World Champ.: (silver) (2026)
- European Champ.: (bronze) (2024, 2025, 2026)
Medal record
Women's judo
Representing Spain
World Championships
Silver medal – second place	2026 Baku	‍–‍52 kg
European Championships
Bronze medal – third place	2024 Zagreb	‍–‍52 kg
Bronze medal – third place	2025 Podgorica	‍–‍52 kg
Bronze medal – third place	2026 Tbilisi	‍–‍52 kg
IJF Grand Slam
Gold medal – first place	2024 Tbilisi	‍–‍52 kg
Silver medal – second place	2026 Paris	‍–‍52 kg
Bronze medal – third place	2024 Paris	‍–‍52 kg
Bronze medal – third place	2024 Baku	‍–‍52 kg
Bronze medal – third place	2025 Tbilisi	‍–‍52 kg
Bronze medal – third place	2025 Tokyo	‍–‍52 kg
Bronze medal – third place	2026 Lausanne	‍–‍52 kg
IJF Grand Prix
Gold medal – first place	2023 Perth	‍–‍52 kg
Bronze medal – third place	2025 Linz	‍–‍52 kg
European U23 Championships
Silver medal – second place	2022 Sarajevo	‍–‍52 kg
European Junior Championships
Silver medal – second place	2023 The Hague	‍–‍52 kg
European Youth Olympic Festival
Silver medal – second place	2019 Baku	‍–‍52 kg

Profile at external databases
- IJF: 50041
- JudoInside.com: 120555
- Updated on 6 October 2026

Ariane Toro Soler (born 10 July 2003) is a Spanish judoka who competes in the ‍–‍52 kg weight class. She won bronze medals at the 2024 European Championships and the 2025 European Championships, won the 2024 Tbilisi Grand Slam, and represented Spain at the 2024 Summer Olympics. She is the daughter of Olympic judokas Yolanda Soler and José Tomás Toro, both of whom competed at the 1996 Summer Olympics.

== Early life and education ==
Toro was born in Bilbao but was raised in Navarre, where the family relocated in 2003 when her mother Yolanda Soler took charge of the Centro de Tecnificación de Judo Navarro in Larrabide, Pamplona. She comes from a notable judo family: her mother is an Atlanta 1996 Olympic bronze medalist in the -48 kg category, while her father José Tomás Toro also competed in judo at the same Olympics in the -65 kg event. All of the Toro Soler siblings practice judo.

Toro attended Ikastola Sanduzelai for her primary education in Pamplona. She later studied a double degree in Law and Business Administration at Universidad Isabel I, a distance-learning university based in Burgos, which allowed her to combine her studies with her international competition schedule.

== Career ==
=== Junior career ===
Toro began competing on the European cadet circuit in 2019, winning a silver medal at the European Youth Olympic Festival in Baku and finishing fifth at the World Cadet Championships.

In 2022, she won gold at the Junior European Championships in Coimbra, defeating all her opponents by ippon. She also won a silver medal at the European Under-23 Championships that year. In 2023, she won a silver medal at the Junior European Championships in The Hague.

=== 2024 season ===
The 2024 season represented Toro's breakthrough at senior level. In February, she earned a bronze medal at the Grand Slam Paris, her first Grand Slam medal.

In March 2024, she won gold at the Grand Slam Tbilisi, defeating Olympic champion Distria Krasniqi in the quarterfinal and winning the final with an uchi-mata in golden score. This result was pivotal in her qualification for the 2024 Summer Olympics.

In April, she won a bronze medal at the 2024 European Judo Championships in Zagreb, in the -52 kg category.

=== 2024 Paris Olympics ===
At the 2024 Paris Olympics, Toro was eliminated in the first round of the individual -52 kg event by Sosorbaram Lkhagvasuren of Mongolia by ippon via immobilization. She finished 17th overall in the individual event.

In the mixed team event, Spain was eliminated in the round of 16 by Japan, 3-4, finishing ninth overall.

=== 2025 season ===
In April 2025, Toro won a bronze medal at the 2025 European Judo Championships in Podgorica, Montenegro, repeating her bronze from the previous year in the -52 kg category.

In February 2026, she won a silver medal at the Grand Slam Paris, losing the final to Distria Krasniqi.

== Competitive record ==
Major results
Year	Competition	Location	Result
2022	Junior European Championships	Coimbra, Portugal	1st place, gold medalist(s)
2024	Grand Slam Paris	Paris, France	3rd place, bronze medalist(s)
2024	Grand Slam Tbilisi	Tbilisi, Georgia	1st place, gold medalist(s)
2024	2024 European Judo Championships	Zagreb, Croatia	3rd place, bronze medalist(s)
2024	Olympic Games (individual)	Paris, France	17th
2024	Olympic Games (mixed team)	Paris, France	9th
2025	2025 European Judo Championships	Podgorica, Montenegro	3rd place, bronze medalist(s)
2026	Grand Slam Paris	Paris, France	2nd place, silver medalist(s)
