= 2026 Judo Grand Slam Budapest =

Judo competition

Judo 2026 Judo Grand Slam Budapest
- Venue: László Papp Budapest Sports Arena
- Location: Budapest, Hungary
- Dates: 11–13 September 2026
- Competitors: 504 from 67 nations
- Total prize money: €154,000

Competition at external databases
- Links: IJF • JudoInside

The 2026 Judo Grand Slam Budapest is a Judo Grand Slam tournament that was held at the László Papp Budapest Sports Arena in Budapest, Hungary from 11 to 13 September 2026 as part of the IJF World Tour and during the 2028 Summer Olympics qualification period.

== Medal summary ==
=== Men's events ===
Event	Gold	Silver	Bronze
Extra-lightweight (−60 kg)	Izhak Ashpiz (ISR)	Enzo Jean (FRA)	David Štarkel (SLO)
Extra-lightweight (−60 kg)	Izhak Ashpiz (ISR)	Enzo Jean (FRA)	Artem Lesiuk (UKR)
Half-lightweight (−66 kg)	Boyan Yotov (BUL)	Ölziibayaryn Byambasüren (MGL)	Ryusei Seki (JPN)
Half-lightweight (−66 kg)	Boyan Yotov (BUL)	Ölziibayaryn Byambasüren (MGL)	Denis Vieru (MDA)
Lightweight (−73 kg)	Rashid Mammadaliyev (AZE)	Narek Vardanian (SWE)	İbrahim Demirel (TUR)
Lightweight (−73 kg)	Rashid Mammadaliyev (AZE)	Narek Vardanian (SWE)	Shusuke Uchimura (JPN)
Half-middleweight (−81 kg)	Yoshito Hojo (JPN)	Mihajlo Simin (SRB)	Murodjon Yuldoshev (UZB)
Half-middleweight (−81 kg)	Yoshito Hojo (JPN)	Mihajlo Simin (SRB)	Vusal Galandarzade (AZE)
Middleweight (−90 kg)	Guilherme Schimidt (BRA)	Boris Rutović (SRB)	Mihail Latișev (MDA)
Middleweight (−90 kg)	Guilherme Schimidt (BRA)	Boris Rutović (SRB)	Lachlan Moorhead (GBR)
Half-heavyweight (−100 kg)	Gennaro Pirelli (ITA)	Jorge Fonseca (POR)	Niyaz Bilalov (RUS)
Half-heavyweight (−100 kg)	Gennaro Pirelli (ITA)	Jorge Fonseca (POR)	Daniel Eich (SUI)
Heavyweight (+100 kg)	Valeriy Endovitskiy (RUS)	Marek-Adrian Mäsak (EST)	Losseni Kone (GER)
Heavyweight (+100 kg)	Valeriy Endovitskiy (RUS)	Marek-Adrian Mäsak (EST)	Dzhamal Gamzatkhanov (AZE)

=== Women's events ===
Event	Gold	Silver	Bronze
Extra-lightweight (−48 kg)	Sabina Giliazova (RUS)	Kristina Dudina (RUS)	Tomoka Arakawa (JPN)
Extra-lightweight (−48 kg)	Sabina Giliazova (RUS)	Kristina Dudina (RUS)	Bavuudorjiin Baasankhüü (MGL)
Half-lightweight (−52 kg)	Ayumi Leiva Sánchez (ESP)	Barbara Twarowska (POL)	Odette Giuffrida (ITA)
Half-lightweight (−52 kg)	Ayumi Leiva Sánchez (ESP)	Barbara Twarowska (POL)	Tereza Bodnárová (CZE)
Lightweight (−57 kg)	Haruka Funakubo (JPN)	Olga Mukhina (RUS)	Seija Ballhaus (GER)
Lightweight (−57 kg)	Haruka Funakubo (JPN)	Olga Mukhina (RUS)	Sarah Souza (BRA)
Half-middleweight (−63 kg)	Megu Danno (JPN)	Kaja Kajzer Žabkar (SLO)	Ariela Sánchez (ESP)
Half-middleweight (−63 kg)	Megu Danno (JPN)	Kaja Kajzer Žabkar (SLO)	Kerem Primo (ISR)
Middleweight (−70 kg)	Elisavet Teltsidou (GRE)	Kaillany Cardoso (BRA)	Serafima Moscalu (ROU)
Middleweight (−70 kg)	Elisavet Teltsidou (GRE)	Kaillany Cardoso (BRA)	Michaela Polleres (AUT)
Half-heavyweight (−78 kg)	Petrunjela Pavić (CRO)	Mao Izumi (JPN)	Fanny Estelle Posvite (FRA)
Half-heavyweight (−78 kg)	Petrunjela Pavić (CRO)	Mao Izumi (JPN)	Metka Lobnik (SLO)
Heavyweight (+78 kg)	Raz Hershko (ISR)	Célia Cancan (FRA)	Safa Soliman (EGY)
Heavyweight (+78 kg)	Raz Hershko (ISR)	Célia Cancan (FRA)	Emma-Melis Aktas (EST)

=== Medal table ===
* Host nation (Hungary)

Rank	Nation	Gold	Silver	Bronze	Total
1	Japan (JPN)	3	1	3	7
2	Russia (RUS)	2	2	1	5
3	Israel (ISR)	2	0	1	3
4	Brazil (BRA)	1	1	1	3
5	Azerbaijan (AZE)	1	0	2	3
6	Italy (ITA)	1	0	1	2
6	Spain (ESP)	1	0	1	2
8	Bulgaria (BUL)	1	0	0	1
8	Croatia (CRO)	1	0	0	1
8	Greece (GRE)	1	0	0	1
11	France (FRA)	0	2	1	3
12	Serbia (SRB)	0	2	0	2
13	Slovenia (SLO)	0	1	2	3
14	Estonia (EST)	0	1	1	2
14	Mongolia (MGL)	0	1	1	2
16	Poland (POL)	0	1	0	1
16	Portugal (POR)	0	1	0	1
16	Sweden (SWE)	0	1	0	1
19	Germany (GER)	0	0	2	2
19	Moldova (MDA)	0	0	2	2
21	Austria (AUT)	0	0	1	1
21	Czech Republic (CZE)	0	0	1	1
21	Egypt (EGY)	0	0	1	1
21	Great Britain (GBR)	0	0	1	1
21	Romania (ROU)	0	0	1	1
21	Switzerland (SUI)	0	0	1	1
21	Turkey (TUR)	0	0	1	1
21	Ukraine (UKR)	0	0	1	1
21	Uzbekistan (UZB)	0	0	1	1
Totals (29 entries)		14	14	28	56

== Prize money ==
The sums written are per medalist, bringing the total prizes awarded to €154,000. (retrieved from:)

Medal	Total	Judoka	Coach
Gold	€5,000	€4,000	€1,000
Silver	€3,000	€2,400	€600
Bronze	€1,500	€1,200	€300
