= Astride Gneto =

French judoka (born 1996)

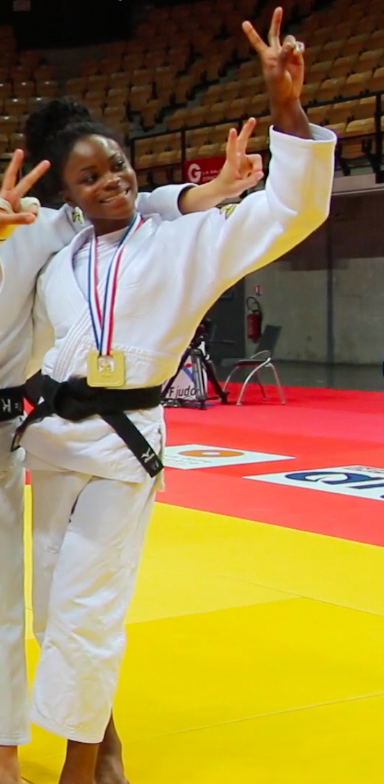
- Gneto in 2019

Personal information
- Born: 24 April 1996 (age 30)
- Occupation: Judoka

Sport
- Country: France
- Sport: Judo
- Weight class: ‍–‍52 kg

Achievements and titles
- World Champ.: R16 (2021)
- European Champ.: 7th (2020, 2024)
Medal record
Women's judo
Representing France
World Championships
Silver medal – second place	2021 Budapest	Mixed team
European Championships
Bronze medal – third place	2016 Kazan	Women's team
World Masters
Bronze medal – third place	2019 Qingdao	‍–‍52 kg
Bronze medal – third place	2021 Doha	‍–‍52 kg
IJF Grand Slam
Gold medal – first place	2016 Abu Dhabi	‍–‍52 kg
Gold medal – first place	2022 Tel Aviv	‍–‍52 kg
Gold medal – first place	2022 Abu Dhabi	‍–‍52 kg
Silver medal – second place	2021 Kazan	‍–‍52 kg
Silver medal – second place	2021 Paris	‍–‍52 kg
Silver medal – second place	2023 Tokyo	‍–‍52 kg
Bronze medal – third place	2018 Paris	‍–‍52 kg
Bronze medal – third place	2019 Paris	‍–‍52 kg
Bronze medal – third place	2022 Antalya	‍–‍52 kg
Bronze medal – third place	2022 Tbilisi	‍–‍52 kg
Bronze medal – third place	2025 Astana	‍–‍52 kg
IJF Grand Prix
Silver medal – second place	2021 Zagreb	‍–‍52 kg
Bronze medal – third place	2018 The Hague	‍–‍52 kg
Bronze medal – third place	2019 Tbilisi	‍–‍52 kg
World Juniors Championships
Bronze medal – third place	2014 Fort Lauderdale	‍–‍52 kg
Bronze medal – third place	2015 Abu Dhabi	‍–‍52 kg
European Junior Championships
Gold medal – first place	2015 Oberwart	‍–‍52 kg
Silver medal – second place	2014 Bucharest	‍–‍52 kg
Bronze medal – third place	2016 Málaga	‍–‍52 kg
Mediterranean Games
Bronze medal – third place	2018 Tarragona	‍–‍52 kg

Profile at external databases
- IJF: 13437
- JudoInside.com: 85162
- Updated on 11 May 2025

Astride Gneto (born 24 April 1996) is a French judoka. She won one of the bronze medals in the women's 52 kg event at the 2018 Mediterranean Games held in Tarragona, Spain.

Gneto won one of the bronze medals in the women's team event at the 2016 European Judo Championships held in Kazan, Russia. In the same year, she won the gold medal in the women's 52 kg event at the 2016 Judo Grand Slam Abu Dhabi held in Abu Dhabi, United Arab Emirates. She also won one of the bronze medals in her event at the 2018 Judo Grand Prix The Hague held in The Hague, Netherlands.

In 2019, Gneto won one of the bronze medals in her event at the Judo World Masters held in Qingdao, China. In 2020, she competed in the women's 52 kg event at the European Judo Championships held in Prague, Czech Republic where she was eliminated in the repechage by Natalia Kuziutina of Russia.

In 2021, Gneto won one of the bronze medals in her event at the Judo World Masters held in Doha, Qatar. In June 2021, she competed in the women's 52 kg and mixed team events at the World Judo Championships held in Budapest, Hungary. In her own event she was eliminated in her second match and in the mixed team event she won the silver medal.

She won the gold medal in her event at the 2022 Judo Grand Slam Tel Aviv held in Tel Aviv, Israel. She won one of the bronze medals in her event at the 2022 Judo Grand Slam Antalya held in Antalya, Turkey.
