= 2025 Judo Grand Prix Zagreb =

Judo Competition

Judo 2025 Judo Grand Prix Zagreb
- Venue: Arena Zagreb
- Location: Zagreb, Croatia
- Dates: 14–16 November 2025
- Competitors: 370 from 48 nations
- Total prize money: €98,000

Competition at external databases
- Links: IJF • JudoInside

The 2025 Judo Grand Prix Zagreb was held at the Arena Zagreb in Zagreb, Croatia from 14 to 16 November 2025 as part of the IJF World Tour.

== Medal summary ==
=== Men's events ===
Event	Gold	Silver	Bronze
Extra-lightweight (−60 kg)	Enzo Jean (FRA)	Romain Valadier-Picard (FRA)	Huseyn Allahyarov (AZE)
Extra-lightweight (−60 kg)	Enzo Jean (FRA)	Romain Valadier-Picard (FRA)	Luis Barroso López (ESP)
Half-lightweight (−66 kg)	David García Torné (ESP)	Elios Manzi (ITA)	Boyan Yotov (BUL)
Half-lightweight (−66 kg)	David García Torné (ESP)	Elios Manzi (ITA)	Bence Pongrácz (HUN)
Lightweight (−73 kg)	Giovanni Esposito (ITA)	Anton Shuhalieiev (ESP)	Victor Skerlev (BUL)
Lightweight (−73 kg)	Giovanni Esposito (ITA)	Anton Shuhalieiev (ESP)	Peter Jean (FRA)
Half-middleweight (−81 kg)	Arnaud Aregba (FRA)	Bernd Fasching (AUT)	Naoto Izawa (JPN)
Half-middleweight (−81 kg)	Arnaud Aregba (FRA)	Bernd Fasching (AUT)	Antonio Esposito (ITA)
Middleweight (−90 kg)	Ivaylo Ivanov (BUL)	Luka Maisuradze (GEO)	Vugar Talibov (AZE)
Middleweight (−90 kg)	Ivaylo Ivanov (BUL)	Luka Maisuradze (GEO)	Miljan Radulj (SRB)
Half-heavyweight (−100 kg)	Nikoloz Sherazadishvili (ESP)	Oleksii Yershov (UKR)	Piotr Kuczera (POL)
Half-heavyweight (−100 kg)	Nikoloz Sherazadishvili (ESP)	Oleksii Yershov (UKR)	Darko Brašnjović (SRB)
Heavyweight (+100 kg)	Kanan Nasibov (AZE)	Jur Spijkers (NED)	Saba Inaneishvili (GEO)
Heavyweight (+100 kg)	Kanan Nasibov (AZE)	Jur Spijkers (NED)	Stephan Hegyi (AUT)

=== Women's events ===
Event	Gold	Silver	Bronze
Extra-lightweight (−48 kg)	Eva Pérez Soler (ESP)	Laura Espadinha (FRA)	Loïs Petit (BEL)
Extra-lightweight (−48 kg)	Eva Pérez Soler (ESP)	Laura Espadinha (FRA)	Andrea Stojadinov (SRB)
Half-lightweight (−52 kg)	Distria Krasniqi (KOS)	Réka Pupp (HUN)	Gaia Stella (ITA)
Half-lightweight (−52 kg)	Distria Krasniqi (KOS)	Réka Pupp (HUN)	Róza Gyertyás (HUN)
Lightweight (−57 kg)	Marica Perišić (SRB)	Ana Viktorija Puljiz (CRO)	Nika Tomc (SLO)
Lightweight (−57 kg)	Marica Perišić (SRB)	Ana Viktorija Puljiz (CRO)	Binta Ndiaye (SUI)
Half-middleweight (−63 kg)	Gili Sharir (ISR)	Angelika Szymańska (POL)	Iva Oberan (CRO)
Half-middleweight (−63 kg)	Gili Sharir (ISR)	Angelika Szymańska (POL)	Lucy Renshall (GBR)
Middleweight (−70 kg)	Shiho Tanaka (JPN)	Clémence Eme (FRA)	Irene Pedrotti (ITA)
Middleweight (−70 kg)	Shiho Tanaka (JPN)	Clémence Eme (FRA)	Aleksandra Andrić (SRB)
Half-heavyweight (−78 kg)	Yelyzaveta Lytvynenko (UAE)	Marie Branser (GUI)	Maidelines Gorguet-Veranes (ROU)
Half-heavyweight (−78 kg)	Yelyzaveta Lytvynenko (UAE)	Marie Branser (GUI)	Lila Mazzarino (FRA)
Heavyweight (+78 kg)	Célia Cancan (FRA)	Léonie Minkada-Caquineau (FRA)	Paulien Sweers (NED)
Heavyweight (+78 kg)	Célia Cancan (FRA)	Léonie Minkada-Caquineau (FRA)	Helena Vuković (CRO)

=== Medal table ===
* Host nation (Croatia)

Rank	Nation	Gold	Silver	Bronze	Total
1	France (FRA)	3	4	2	9
2	Spain (ESP)	3	1	1	5
3	Italy (ITA)	1	1	3	5
4	Serbia (SRB)	1	0	4	5
5	Azerbaijan (AZE)	1	0	2	3
5	Bulgaria (BUL)	1	0	2	3
7	Japan (JPN)	1	0	1	2
8	Israel (ISR)	1	0	0	1
8	Kosovo (KOS)	1	0	0	1
8	United Arab Emirates (UAE)	1	0	0	1
11	Croatia (CRO)*	0	1	2	3
11	Hungary (HUN)	0	1	2	3
13	Austria (AUT)	0	1	1	2
13	Georgia (GEO)	0	1	1	2
13	Netherlands (NED)	0	1	1	2
13	Poland (POL)	0	1	1	2
17	Guinea (GUI)	0	1	0	1
17	Ukraine (UKR)	0	1	0	1
19	Belgium (BEL)	0	0	1	1
19	Great Britain (GBR)	0	0	1	1
19	Romania (ROU)	0	0	1	1
19	Slovenia (SLO)	0	0	1	1
19	Switzerland (SUI)	0	0	1	1
Totals (23 entries)		14	14	28	56

== Prize money ==
The sums written are per medalist, bringing the total prizes awarded to €98,000. (retrieved from:)

Medal	Total	Judoka	Coach
Gold	€3,000	€2,400	€600
Silver	€2,000	€1,600	€400
Bronze	€1,000	€800	€200
