= 2022 Judo Grand Slam Tbilisi =

Judo Competition

Judo 2022 Judo Grand Slam Tbilisi
- Venue: Olympic Palace
- Location: Tbilisi, Georgia
- Dates: 3–5 June 2022
- Competitors: 278 from 36 nations
- Total prize money: €154,000

Competition at external databases
- Links: IJF • EJU • JudoInside

The 2022 Judo Grand Slam Tbilisi was to be held in Tbilisi, Georgia, from 25 to 27 March 2022. On 3 March 2022, it was postponed to 3–5 June 2022.

== Event videos ==
The event was aired on the IJF YouTube channel.

| | Weight classes | Preliminaries | | | Final Block |
|---|---|---|---|---|---|
| Day 1 | Men: -60, -66 Women: -48, -52, -57 | Commentated | | | Commentated |
| Day 1 | Men: -60, -66 Women: -48, -52, -57 | Tatami 1 | Tatami 2 | Tatami 3 | Commentated |
| Day 2 | Men: -73, -81 Women: -63, -70 | Commentated | | | Commentated |
| Day 2 | Men: -73, -81 Women: -63, -70 | Tatami 1 | Tatami 2 | Tatami 3 | Commentated |
| Day 3 | Men: -90, -100, +100 Women: -78, +78 | Commentated | | | Commentated |
| Day 3 | Men: -90, -100, +100 Women: -78, +78 | Tatami 1 | Tatami 2 | Tatami 3 | Commentated |

== Medal summary ==
=== Men's events ===
| Event | Gold | Silver | Bronze |
|---|---|---|---|
| Extra-lightweight (−60 kg) | Temur Nozadze (GEO) | Giorgi Sardalashvili (GEO) | Turan Bayramov (AZE) |
| Extra-lightweight (−60 kg) | Temur Nozadze (GEO) | Giorgi Sardalashvili (GEO) | Genki Koga (JPN) |
| Half-lightweight (−66 kg) | Denis Vieru (MDA) | Giorgi Tutashvili (GEO) | Ryoma Tanaka (JPN) |
| Half-lightweight (−66 kg) | Denis Vieru (MDA) | Giorgi Tutashvili (GEO) | Vazha Margvelashvili (GEO) |
| Lightweight (−73 kg) | Lasha Shavdatuashvili (GEO) | Ken Oyoshi (JPN) | Giorgi Terashvili (GEO) |
| Lightweight (−73 kg) | Lasha Shavdatuashvili (GEO) | Ken Oyoshi (JPN) | Murodjon Yuldoshev (UZB) |
| Half-middleweight (−81 kg) | Lee Joon-hwan (KOR) | Tato Grigalashvili (GEO) | Eljan Hajiyev (AZE) |
| Half-middleweight (−81 kg) | Lee Joon-hwan (KOR) | Tato Grigalashvili (GEO) | Sharofiddin Boltaboev (UZB) |
| Middleweight (−90 kg) | Beka Gviniashvili (GEO) | Krisztián Tóth (HUN) | Maxime-Gaël Ngayap Hambou (FRA) |
| Middleweight (−90 kg) | Beka Gviniashvili (GEO) | Krisztián Tóth (HUN) | Shoichiro Mukai (JPN) |
| Half-heavyweight (−100 kg) | Onise Saneblidze (GEO) | Giorgi Beriashvili (GEO) | Otabek Turaboev (UZB) |
| Half-heavyweight (−100 kg) | Onise Saneblidze (GEO) | Giorgi Beriashvili (GEO) | Daniel Herbst (GER) |
| Heavyweight (+100 kg) | Gela Zaalishvili (GEO) | Alisher Yusupov (UZB) | Shokhrukhkhon Bakhtiyorov (UZB) |
| Heavyweight (+100 kg) | Gela Zaalishvili (GEO) | Alisher Yusupov (UZB) | Levani Matiashvili (GEO) |

=== Women's events ===
| Event | Gold | Silver | Bronze |
|---|---|---|---|
| Extra-lightweight (−48 kg) | Mélanie Clément (FRA) | Laura Martinez Abelenda (ESP) | Katharina Tanzer (AUT) |
| Extra-lightweight (−48 kg) | Mélanie Clément (FRA) | Laura Martinez Abelenda (ESP) | Blandine Pont (FRA) |
| Half-lightweight (−52 kg) | Distria Krasniqi (KOS) | Réka Pupp (HUN) | Astride Gneto (FRA) |
| Half-lightweight (−52 kg) | Distria Krasniqi (KOS) | Réka Pupp (HUN) | Estrella López (ESP) |
| Lightweight (−57 kg) | Huh Mi-mi (KOR) | Pauline Starke (GER) | Eteri Liparteliani (GEO) |
| Lightweight (−57 kg) | Huh Mi-mi (KOR) | Pauline Starke (GER) | Rafaela Silva (BRA) |
| Half-middleweight (−63 kg) | Inbal Shemesh (ISR) | Ketleyn Quadros (BRA) | Manon Deketer (FRA) |
| Half-middleweight (−63 kg) | Inbal Shemesh (ISR) | Ketleyn Quadros (BRA) | Tamires Crude (BRA) |
| Middleweight (−70 kg) | Sanne van Dijke (NED) | Ai Tsunoda (ESP) | Sarah Mäkelburg (GER) |
| Middleweight (−70 kg) | Sanne van Dijke (NED) | Ai Tsunoda (ESP) | Nataliia Chystiakova (UKR) |
| Half-heavyweight (−78 kg) | Anna-Maria Wagner (GER) | Mayra Aguiar (BRA) | Natalie Powell (GBR) |
| Half-heavyweight (−78 kg) | Anna-Maria Wagner (GER) | Mayra Aguiar (BRA) | Karen Stevenson (NED) |
| Heavyweight (+78 kg) | Julia Tolofua (FRA) | Nihel Cheikh Rouhou (TUN) | Sophio Somkhishvili (GEO) |
| Heavyweight (+78 kg) | Julia Tolofua (FRA) | Nihel Cheikh Rouhou (TUN) | Marit Kamps (NED) |

Source Results

=== Medal table ===
* Host nation (Georgia)

| Rank | Nation | Gold | Silver | Bronze | Total |
|---|---|---|---|---|---|
| 1 | Georgia (GEO)* | 5 | 4 | 5 | 14 |
| 2 | France (FRA) | 2 | 0 | 4 | 6 |
| 3 | South Korea (KOR) | 2 | 0 | 0 | 2 |
| 4 | Germany (GER) | 1 | 1 | 2 | 4 |
| 5 | Netherlands (NED) | 1 | 0 | 2 | 3 |
| 6 | Israel (ISR) | 1 | 0 | 0 | 1 |
| 6 | Kosovo (KOS) | 1 | 0 | 0 | 1 |
| 6 | Moldova (MDA) | 1 | 0 | 0 | 1 |
| 9 | Brazil (BRA) | 0 | 2 | 2 | 4 |
| 10 | Spain (ESP) | 0 | 2 | 1 | 3 |
| 11 | Hungary (HUN) | 0 | 2 | 0 | 2 |
| 12 | Uzbekistan (UZB) | 0 | 1 | 4 | 5 |
| 13 | Japan (JPN) | 0 | 1 | 3 | 4 |
| 14 | Tunisia (TUN) | 0 | 1 | 0 | 1 |
| 15 | Azerbaijan (AZE) | 0 | 0 | 2 | 2 |
| 16 | Austria (AUT) | 0 | 0 | 1 | 1 |
| 16 | Great Britain (GBR) | 0 | 0 | 1 | 1 |
| 16 | Ukraine (UKR) | 0 | 0 | 1 | 1 |
| Totals (18 entries) | | 14 | 14 | 28 | 56 |

== Prize money ==
The sums written are per medalist, bringing the total prizes awarded to €154,000. (retrieved from:)

| Medal | Total | Judoka | Coach |
|---|---|---|---|
| Gold | €5,000 | €4,000 | €1,000 |
| Silver | €3,000 | €2,400 | €600 |
| Bronze | €1,500 | €1,200 | €300 |
