= Paulina Martínez =

Mexican judoka (born 1999)

Personal information
- Full name: Paulina Lizbeth Martínez Claro
- Born: 10 April 1999 (age 27)
- Occupation: Judoka

Sport
- Country: Mexico
- Sport: Judo
- Weight class: ‍–‍52 kg

Achievements and titles
- Olympic Games: R32 (2024)
- World Champ.: R32 (2024, 2025)
- Pan American Champ.: (2023)
Medal record
Women's judo
Representing Mexico
Pan American Games
Silver medal – second place	2023 Santiago	‍–‍52 kg
Pan American Championships
Silver medal – second place	2023 Calgary	‍–‍52 kg
Bronze medal – third place	2026 Panama City	‍–‍52 kg
Central American and Caribbean Games
Silver medal – second place	2023 San Salvador	‍–‍52 kg
Bronze medal – third place	2026 Santo Domingo	‍–‍52 kg
Pan American Junior Championships
Gold medal – first place	2019 Cali	‍–‍52 kg
Bronze medal – third place	2017 Cancún	‍–‍52 kg
Pan American Cadet Championships
Bronze medal – third place	2016 Cordoba	‍–‍48 kg

Profile at external databases
- IJF: 33905
- JudoInside.com: 107822
- Updated on 27 July 2026

Paulina Lizbeth Martínez Claro (Note: In this Spanish name, the first or paternal surname is Martínez and the second or maternal family name is Claro.) (born 10 April 1999) is a Mexican judoka. Martinez won a silver medal at the 2023 Pan American Games in the women's 52 kg competition. At the 2024 Summer Olympics where she competed in the women's 52 kg judo event, she lost by ippon in the first round to Mascha Ballhaus.
