= Tinka Easton =

Australian judoka (born 1996)

Personal information
- Born: 15 June 1996 (age 30) Valley Heights, New South Wales
- Occupation: Judoka

Sport
- Country: Australia
- Sport: Judo
- Weight class: ‍–‍52 kg

Achievements and titles
- World Champ.: R16 (2018, 2023, 2024, 2026)
- Oceania Champ.: (gold) (2017, 2026); (bronze) (2022, 2023)
- Commonwealth Games: (gold) (2022)
Medal record
Women's judo
Representing Australia
Pan American Championships
Bronze medal – third place	2022 Lima	‍–‍52 kg
Bronze medal – third place	2023 Calgary	‍–‍52 kg
Bronze medal – third place	2025 Santiago	‍–‍57 kg
Oceania Championships
Gold medal – first place	2017 Nukuʻalofa	‍–‍52 kg
Gold medal – first place	2026 Melbourne	‍–‍52 kg
Oceania Junior Championships
Gold medal – first place	2014 Auckland	‍–‍52 kg
Silver medal – second place	2013 Apia	‍–‍52 kg
Silver medal – second place	2015 Nouvelle	‍–‍52 kg
Commonwealth Games
Gold medal – first place	2022 Birmingham	‍–‍52 kg

Profile at external databases
- IJF: 12359
- JudoInside.com: 76432
- Updated on 5 October 2026

Tinka Easton (born 15 June 1996) is an Australian judoka.

As a 10-year-old, Easton joined the Bushido Judo Club at the Shoalhaven Heads Community Centre in New South Wales. She claimed three consecutive Australian under-21 titles between 2014 and 2016, followed by three consecutive senior titles from 2017 to 2019.

Easton was number 1 of the IJF World Ranking for juniors U52kg in 2014. Easton was the 2017 Oceania Championships winner, and made her world championship debut in 2017 and won bronze.

Easton won gold in the Judo at the 2022 Commonwealth Games – Women's 52 kg against Canada's Kelly Deguchi, winning via a Waza-ari throw, during the golden score period.

At the 2026 Commonwealth Games in Glasgow, Scotland, she reached the semi-finals before losing to eventual gold medalist Evelyn Beaton of Canada and Cameroon's Marie Celine Baba Matia in the bronze medal bout.
