= José Tomás Toro =

Spanish judoka

José Tomás Toro (born 11 November 1970) is a Spanish judoka. He competed in the men's half-lightweight event at the 1996 Summer Olympics.

== Achievements ==
Year	Tournament	Place	Weight class
1995	European Judo Championships	5th	Half lightweight (65 kg)
