= Fabienne Kocher =

Swiss judoka (born 1993)

Personal information
- Born: 13 June 1993 (age 33)
- Occupation: Judoka
- Website: www.fabiennekocher.ch

Sport
- Country: Switzerland
- Sport: Judo
- Weight class: ‍–‍52 kg

Achievements and titles
- Olympic Games: 5th (2020)
- World Champ.: (bronze) (2021)
- European Champ.: 7th (2020, 2021, 2022)
Medal record
Women's judo
Representing Switzerland
World Championships
Bronze medal – third place	2021 Budapest	‍–‍52 kg
IJF Grand Slam
Gold medal – first place	2024 Dushanbe	‍–‍52 kg
Silver medal – second place	2020 Budapest	‍–‍52 kg
Bronze medal – third place	2021 Tashkent	‍–‍52 kg
Bronze medal – third place	2022 Paris	‍–‍52 kg
IJF Grand Prix
Silver medal – second place	2019 Budapest	‍–‍52 kg
Bronze medal – third place	2019 Tel Aviv	‍–‍52 kg
Bronze medal – third place	2022 Almada	‍–‍52 kg
Bronze medal – third place	2022 Zagreb	‍–‍52 kg
European U23 Championships
Bronze medal – third place	2013 Samokov	‍–‍57 kg
World Juniors Championships
Bronze medal – third place	2011 Cape Town	‍–‍57 kg
Bronze medal – third place	2013 Ljubljana	‍–‍57 kg
European Junior Championships
Gold medal – first place	2013 Sarajevo	‍–‍57 kg
Bronze medal – third place	2010 Samokov	‍–‍57 kg
Bronze medal – third place	2011 Lommel	‍–‍57 kg

Profile at external databases
- IJF: 3352
- JudoInside.com: 51478
- Updated on 3 May 2024

Fabienne Kocher (born 13 June 1993) is a Swiss judoka. She won one of the bronze medals in the women's 52 kg event at the 2021 World Judo Championships held in Budapest, Hungary. She also represented Switzerland at the 2020 Summer Olympics in Tokyo, Japan.

== Career ==
Kocher previously competed at the World Judo Championships in 2014 and 2015 in the women's 57 kg event and in 2018 and 2019 in the women's 52 kg event. She also competed in the women's 52 kg event at the European Judo Championships in 2020 and 2021.

In 2019, Kocher represented Switzerland in the women's 52 kg event at the European Games held in Minsk, Belarus. She was eliminated in her second match by Majlinda Kelmendi of Kosovo.

In 2021, Kocher lost her bronze medal match in the women's 52 kg event at the 2020 Summer Olympics in Tokyo, Japan.

Kocher won one of the bronze medals in her event at the 2022 Judo Grand Prix Almada held in Almada, Portugal. She also won one of the bronze medals in her event at the 2022 Judo Grand Slam Paris held in Paris, France.

== Achievements ==
Year	Tournament	Place	Weight class
2021	World Championships	3rd	−52 kg

== Awards ==
In March 2022, she won the Aargau Sportswoman of the Year award.
