= Universidad Isabel I =

Private university in Burgos, Spain

- Universidad Internacional Isabel I de Castilla (Spanish)
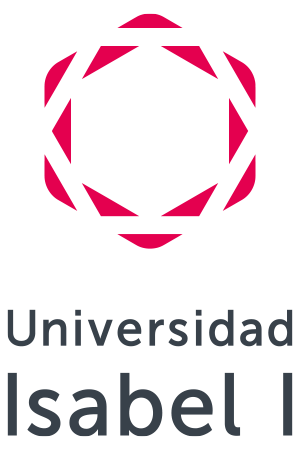
- Type: Private university, state-recognized
- Established: 2008
- Rector: Alberto Gómez Barahona
- Students: 8,000 (academic year 2017–2018)
- Location: Burgos and Valladolid, Castile and León, Spain; 42.34056°N 3.70833°W
- Colors: Red
- Nickname: ui1
- Website: ui1.es
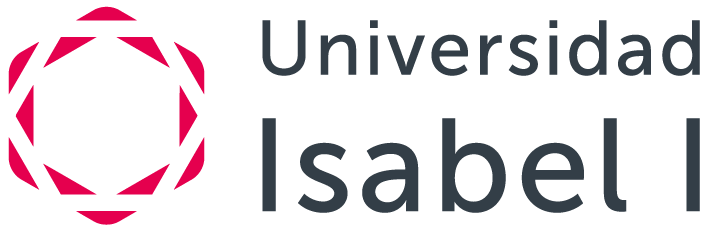

- Location in Castile and León Universidad Isabel I (Spain)

Universidad Isabel I (Spanish: Universidad Internacional Isabel I de Castilla), also known as University Isabel I of Castile or University Isabel I, is a private, state-recognized university located in Burgos, Spain which offers studies in business, law, economics, humanities and health science degrees mainly for working professionals and trainees via blended learning and distance learning.

The university was established in 2008, fully accredited by the Spanish Government via Act of Parliament in 2011 to confer official degrees, granted Royal Charter by King Juan Carlos I, recognized in the European Union by the European Higher Education Area (EHEA), all its courses are (ECTS) European Credit Transfer and Accumulation System, the Ui1 is a member of the "Mentors for Dual Careers" an ERASMUS+ SPORT, Ui1 degrees and education programs are certified by the Ministry of Science, Innovation, and Universities (MICIU) and the Secretary of State for Universities and Research of Spain under the regulations of the European Union.

== History ==
The university was founded in 2008 with the aim of providing talented and working people with a challenging academic education, while at the same time enabling them to continue their professional career while studying. Students should be given the opportunity to simultaneously integrate theoretical knowledge from their studies into their everyday professional life and to make use of practical experience from their professional life to better understand complex theoretical study contents. University Isabel I was inaugurated through Act 3/2011 by the Parliament and the President of Castile and León in 2011, when it was also formally authorized by the Kingdom of Spain to enroll official degree courses on Bachelor, Master and PhD level.

In 2021, Forbes listed the university as one of the 20 best universities in Spain.

== Campuses ==
The university's campuses are located in Burgos and Valladolid. The main campus is located in Burgos, in the building of the former Seminario Mayor of the Archdiocese of Burgos, in the upper part of the city, some 500 metres from the Cathedral. It occupies an area of 6,534 m^{2} distributed over five floors and side buildings. The central services of the rector's office, main hall, administration, general secretary's office, media library/virtual library, teachers' work areas and classrooms, as well as the computer services, are located in Calle Fernán González 76. The Valladolid campus is located in Paseo de Filipinos 3 (next to Plaza de Colón and the train station).

== Faculties ==
- Faculty of Law and Economics Sciences
- Faculty of Natural Sciences and Technology
- Faculty of Health Sciences
- Faculty of Humanities and Social Sciences
- Faculty of Criminology

== Degree Programmes ==
In the academic year 2020/2021 University Isabel I offers twelve 12 different bachelor's degrees, 7 double degree undergraduate programmes, and more than fifty 50 Master's and postgraduate degrees with different majors.

The Isabel I University and the Fernán González Institution will collaborate on research on digital transformation linked to the humanities and social sciences signing a partnership on 17 January 2019. The Isabel I University continues to consolidate its research development strategy. This morning, the rector of the academic institution, Alberto Gómez Barahona, and the director of the Burgense Royal Academy of History and Fine Arts, Fernán González Institution, José Manuel López Gómez, signed a specific collaboration agreement for both entities to jointly investigate on the technological and digital transformation in the field of education, humanities and economic and legal sciences. The agreement signed between the top managers of both entities has as its objective the sum of efforts to carry out, among other issues, a doctoral program.

The Ui1 Language Department offers a learning and certification program in Second Language Learning and Performance in English and Spanish. The program in English has been developed and certified by the University of Oxford in the United Kingdom. The Oxford Test of English (OTE) is an exam created by AI that assesses English language skills from level A2 to C1 under the guidelines of the Common European Framework of Reference for Languages (CEFR). The program in Spanish officially certifies the level of Spanish, through SIELE at a distance, the online multi-level exam created and certified in the consortium by the Instituto Cervantes, the National Autonomous University of Mexico, the University of Salamanca, and the University of Buenos Aires.

The Isabel I University has signed an agreement with the University of Cambridge, Department of English Language Assessment, Cambridge International Education the agreement was signed in 2020 at the main campus in Burgos, the agreement has been signed between Alberto Gómez Barahona, rector of Universidad Isabel I, and by Robin Gravina, head of development of Cambridge English Language Assessment responsible for academics in the territory of Spain and Portugal, on behalf of Saul Nassé, University of Cambridge, executive director of the institution certifying the quality of the programs delivered in English.

== International Academic Cooperation ==
Since 1 April 2022, the University Isabel I has been a member of the Erasmus+ scholarship program, which can be taken at more than 1,000 universities across Europe. The European mobility program allows students to travel to higher education institutions in the 28 Member States of the European Union and six other European countries, such as North Macedonia, Iceland, Norway, Serbia, Liechtenstein, and Turkey, in the Americas with Erasmus Mundus and participate of (RECLA) the Continuing Education Network for Latin America and Europe.

== The Foundation ==
The Isabel I University Foundation was established in 2010 as a private, non-profit entity, with its own independent legal persona. The Foundation contributes to improving and consolidating the University's relations with its economic and social environment, collaborating in the search for the "first job" of the students, through the conclusion of agreements with companies and institutions.
