= Ayumi Leiva Sánchez =

Spanish judoka (born 2002)

Personal information
- Born: 4 May 2002 (age 24)
- Occupation: Judoka

Sport
- Country: Spain
- Sport: Judo
- Weight class: ‍–‍52 kg

Achievements and titles
- World Champ.: (bronze) (2026)
- European Champ.: 7th (2025)
Medal record
Women's judo
Representing Spain
World Championships
Bronze medal – third place	2026 Baku	‍–‍52 kg
IJF Grand Slam
Gold medal – first place	2026 Budapest	‍–‍52 kg
Silver medal – second place	2025 Tashkent	‍–‍52 kg
Silver medal – second place	2025 Astana	‍–‍52 kg
Bronze medal – third place	2024 Antalya	‍–‍52 kg
Bronze medal – third place	2024 Astana	‍–‍52 kg
Bronze medal – third place	2025 Paris	‍–‍52 kg
Bronze medal – third place	2025 Baku	‍–‍52 kg
IJF Grand Prix
Silver medal – second place	2024 Zagreb	‍–‍52 kg
Silver medal – second place	2025 Guadalajara	‍–‍52 kg
Bronze medal – third place	2026 Linz	‍–‍52 kg
Bronze medal – third place	2026 Qingdao	‍–‍52 kg
European U23 Championships
Gold medal – first place	2024 Piła	‍–‍52 kg

Profile at external databases
- IJF: 82119
- JudoInside.com: 115234
- Updated on 5 October 2026

Ayumi Leiva Sánchez (born 4 May 2002) is a Cuban-born Spanish judoka.

== Early life ==
Sánchez was born in Cuba and began judo at eight years old. In August 2021, she deflected from Cuba during a flight with the Cuban national judo team on its way to participate in the Junior Pan American Qualifier event. Since there were no direct flights from Havana, they had to connect in Madrid, where she requested political asylum from the passport control police, along with Nahomys Acosta. She obtained Spanish citizenship in July 2023.

== Career ==
Sánchez began competing for Spain in March 2024. She won a bronze medal in her debut competition, the 2024 Judo Grand Slam Antalya. Since making her debut, she has medalled in six of the seven Grand Slams she has contested, including two silvers and four bronze medals.

In September 2026, she competed at the 2026 Judo Grand Slam Budapest and won her first career Judo Grand Slam gold medal in the –‍52 kg category. The next month she competed at the 2026 World Judo Championships and won a bronze medal in the –‍52 kg category. In the semifinals, she lost to Japan's Uta Abe, who won by ippon with 3:22 remaining. In the repechage, she defeated Mongolia's Bayanmönkhiin Uranzayaa to secure the bronze medal.
