= Mascha Ballhaus =

German judoka (born 2000)

Personal information
- Born: 27 July 2000 (age 25) Hamburg, Germany
- Occupation: Judoka

Sport
- Country: Germany
- Sport: Judo
- Weight class: ‍–‍52 kg

Achievements and titles
- Olympic Games: 7th (2024)
- World Champ.: (bronze) (2024, 2025)
- European Champ.: (bronze) (2023)
- Highest world ranking: 2^{nd}
Medal record
Women's judo
Representing Germany
World Championships
Bronze medal – third place	2024 Abu Dhabi	‍–‍52 kg
Bronze medal – third place	2025 Budapest	‍–‍52 kg
Bronze medal – third place	2025 Budapest	Mixed team
European Championships
Bronze medal – third place	2023 Montpellier	‍–‍52 kg
IJF Grand Slam
Gold medal – first place	2023 Tashkent	‍–‍52 kg
Gold medal – first place	2025 Astana	‍–‍52 kg
Gold medal – first place	2025 Abu Dhabi	‍–‍52 kg
Silver medal – second place	2023 Abu Dhabi	‍–‍52 kg
Silver medal – second place	2025 Baku	‍–‍52 kg
Bronze medal – third place	2021 Paris	‍–‍52 kg
Bronze medal – third place	2023 Tbilisi	‍–‍52 kg
Bronze medal – third place	2024 Tbilisi	‍–‍52 kg
Bronze medal – third place	2026 Paris	‍–‍52 kg
IJF Grand Prix
Silver medal – second place	2026 Qingdao	‍–‍52 kg
Bronze medal – third place	2023 Zagreb	‍–‍52 kg
Bronze medal – third place	2024 Odivelas	‍–‍52 kg
Bronze medal – third place	2025 Linz	‍–‍52 kg
European U23 Championships
Silver medal – second place	2021 Budapest	‍–‍52 kg
World Cadets Championships
Silver medal – second place	2017 Santiago	‍–‍48 kg
European Cadet Championships
Gold medal – first place	2017 Kaunas	‍–‍48 kg
Bronze medal – third place	2016 Vantaa	‍–‍48 kg

Profile at external databases
- IJF: 22532
- JudoInside.com: 95436
- Updated on 26 June 2026

Mascha Ballhaus (born 27 July 2000) is a German judoka. She won a bronze medal at the 2023 European Judo Championships and is a two-time medalist at the World Judo Championships.

== Career ==
Ballhaus competed in the 48 kg category from 2016 to 2019. In 2016 she was third at the Cadet European Championships. In 2017 she won the individual and team competitions at the Cadet European Championships and finished second at the Cadet World Championships. In 2018 and 2019 she finished fifth at the Junior European Championships.

In 2020, Ballhaus moved up to the 52 kg weight class. In November 2021 she finished second at the U23 European Championships behind Croatian Ana Viktorija Puljiz. In April 2022, she reached the semifinals at the European Championships in Sofia. After the semifinal defeat against the British Chelsie Giles, she lost to against Distria Krasniqi from Kosovo for the bronze. In January 2023, Ballhaus won her first German championship title. At the same championships, her twin sister Seija Ballhaus won in the weight class up to 57 kg division.

In March 2023, Mascha Ballhaus won the final of the Judo Grand Slam Tashkent against the Japanese Ai Shishime. At the European Championships in Montpellier, she lost in the quarterfinals to the French Amandine Buchard. With victories over the Israeli Gefen Primo in the repechage round and over the Italian Odette Giuffrida in the fight for third place, Ballhaus won a bronze medal. At the 2024 World Championships in Abu Dhabi, she lost in the quarterfinals to Amandine Buchard. With victories over Brazilian Larissa Pimenta and Japanese Hibiki Shiraishi, Ballhaus secured a bronze medal at the World Championships.

At the 2025 World Championships in Budapest, Ballhaus, won another bronze medal.
