= Ana Pérez Box =

Spanish judoka (born 1995)

Personal information
- Full name: Ana Isabel Pérez Box
- Nationality: Spanish
- Born: 29 December 1995 (age 30)
- Occupation: Judoka

Sport
- Country: Spain
- Sport: Judo
- Weight class: –52 kg
- Club: Judo Club Wiesbaden 1922

Achievements and titles
- Olympic Games: R32 (2020)
- World Champ.: (silver) (2021)
- European Champ.: 5th (2020, 2021)
Medal record
Women's judo
Representing Spain
World Championships
Silver medal – second place	2021 Budapest	‍–‍52 kg
IJF Grand Slam
Silver medal – second place	2019 Ekaterinburg	‍–‍52 kg
Silver medal – second place	2023 Tel Aviv	‍–‍52 kg
Bronze medal – third place	2021 Kazan	‍–‍52 kg
Bronze medal – third place	2023 Tashkent	‍–‍52 kg
IJF Grand Prix
Gold medal – first place	2018 Cancún	‍–‍52 kg
Silver medal – second place	2019 Marrakesh	‍–‍52 kg
Silver medal – second place	2019 Perth	‍–‍52 kg
Bronze medal – third place	2018 Hohhot	‍–‍52 kg
Bronze medal – third place	2018 Tashkent	‍–‍52 kg
Bronze medal – third place	2019 Budapest	‍–‍52 kg
European U23 Championships
Bronze medal – third place	2017 Podgorica	‍–‍52 kg
Mediterranean Games
Bronze medal – third place	2022 Oran	‍–‍52 kg

Profile at external databases
- IJF: 21313
- JudoInside.com: 100724
- Updated on 23 May 2023

Ana Isabel Pérez Box (born 29 December 1995) is a Spanish judoka. She won the silver medal in the women's 52 kg event at the 2021 World Judo Championships held in Budapest, Hungary.

She is the silver medallist of the 2019 Judo Grand Slam Ekaterinburg in the −52 kg category.

She won one of the bronze medals in the women's 52 kg event at the 2022 Mediterranean Games held in Oran, Algeria.
