= Distria Krasniqi =

Kosovar judoka (born 1995)

Distria Krasniqi NK
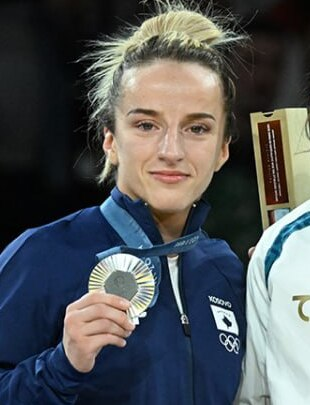
- Krasniqi at the 2024 Summer Olympics

Personal information
- Born: 12 October 1995 (age 30) Pejë, AP Kosovo, FR Yugoslavia (present-day Kosovo)
- Occupation: Judoka
- Height: 1.53 m (5 ft 0 in)
- Military career
- Allegiance: Albania
- Branch: Albanian Armed Forces
- Service years: 2021–
- Rank: Colonel

Sport
- Country: Kosovo
- Sport: Judo
- Weight class: ‍–‍48 kg, ‍–‍52 kg

Achievements and titles
- Olympic Games: (gold) (2020)
- World Champ.: (silver) (2025)
- European Champ.: (gold) (2021, 2024, 2025, 2026)
- Highest world ranking: 1^{st}
Medal record
Women's judo
Representing Kosovo
Olympic Games
| Gold medal – first place | 2020 Tokyo | ‍–‍48 kg |
| Silver medal – second place | 2024 Paris | ‍–‍52 kg |
World Championships
| Silver medal – second place | 2025 Budapest | ‍–‍52 kg |
| Bronze medal – third place | 2019 Tokyo | ‍–‍48 kg |
| Bronze medal – third place | 2022 Tashkent | ‍–‍52 kg |
European Championships
| Gold medal – first place | 2021 Lisbon | ‍–‍48 kg |
| Gold medal – first place | 2024 Zagreb | ‍–‍52 kg |
| Gold medal – first place | 2025 Podgorica | ‍–‍52 kg |
| Gold medal – first place | 2026 Tbilisi | ‍–‍52 kg |
| Silver medal – second place | 2018 Tel Aviv | ‍–‍52 kg |
| Silver medal – second place | 2023 Montpellier | ‍–‍52 kg |
| Bronze medal – third place | 2020 Prague | ‍–‍48 kg |
| Bronze medal – third place | 2022 Sofia | ‍–‍52 kg |
European Championships Open
| Bronze medal – third place | 2023 Pristina | ‍–‍57 kg |
World Masters
| Gold medal – first place | 2018 Guangzhou | ‍–‍48 kg |
| Gold medal – first place | 2019 Qingdao | ‍–‍48 kg |
| Gold medal – first place | 2021 Doha | ‍–‍48 kg |
| Gold medal – first place | 2022 Jerusalem | ‍–‍52 kg |
| Silver medal – second place | 2023 Budapest | ‍–‍52 kg |
IJF Grand Slam
| Gold medal – first place | 2020 Paris | ‍–‍52 kg |
| Gold medal – first place | 2020 Budapest | ‍–‍48 kg |
| Gold medal – first place | 2022 Tbilisi | ‍–‍52 kg |
| Gold medal – first place | 2023 Paris | ‍–‍52 kg |
| Gold medal – first place | 2024 Paris | ‍–‍52 kg |
| Gold medal – first place | 2026 Paris | ‍–‍52 kg |
| Silver medal – second place | 2018 Abu Dhabi | ‍–‍48 kg |
| Silver medal – second place | 2019 Paris | ‍–‍48 kg |
| Silver medal – second place | 2022 Paris | ‍–‍52 kg |
| Silver medal – second place | 2023 Tbilisi | ‍–‍52 kg |
| Silver medal – second place | 2023 Baku | ‍–‍52 kg |
| Bronze medal – third place | 2015 Baku | ‍–‍52 kg |
| Bronze medal – third place | 2017 Paris | ‍–‍52 kg |
| Bronze medal – third place | 2018 Paris | ‍–‍52 kg |
| Bronze medal – third place | 2024 Tbilisi | ‍–‍52 kg |
| Bronze medal – third place | 2025 Paris | ‍–‍52 kg |
| Bronze medal – third place | 2025 Abu Dhabi | ‍–‍52 kg |
IJF Grand Prix
| Gold medal – first place | 2015 Samsun | ‍–‍52 kg |
| Gold medal – first place | 2017 Antalya | ‍–‍52 kg |
| Gold medal – first place | 2017 The Hague | ‍–‍52 kg |
| Gold medal – first place | 2018 Antalya | ‍–‍52 kg |
| Gold medal – first place | 2018 Tashkent | ‍–‍48 kg |
| Gold medal – first place | 2019 Antalya | ‍–‍48 kg |
| Gold medal – first place | 2022 Almada | ‍–‍52 kg |
| Gold medal – first place | 2025 Zagreb | ‍–‍52 kg |
| Silver medal – second place | 2016 Budapest | ‍–‍52 kg |
| Silver medal – second place | 2016 Zagreb | ‍–‍52 kg |
| Silver medal – second place | 2018 Tunis | ‍–‍52 kg |
| Silver medal – second place | 2019 Budapest | ‍–‍48 kg |
| Silver medal – second place | 2022 Zagreb | ‍–‍52 kg |
| Silver medal – second place | 2025 Linz | ‍–‍52 kg |
| Bronze medal – third place | 2014 Düsseldorf | ‍–‍48 kg |
| Bronze medal – third place | 2015 Zagreb | ‍–‍52 kg |
| Bronze medal – third place | 2016 Samsun | ‍–‍52 kg |
| Bronze medal – third place | 2018 Budapest | ‍–‍48 kg |
| Bronze medal – third place | 2018 The Hague | ‍–‍48 kg |
European U23 Championships
| Gold medal – first place | 2016 Tel Aviv | ‍–‍52 kg |
| Gold medal – first place | 2017 Podgorica | ‍–‍52 kg |
| Bronze medal – third place | 2012 Prague | ‍–‍52 kg |
| Bronze medal – third place | 2013 Samokov | ‍–‍52 kg |
World Juniors Championships
| Gold medal – first place | 2015 Abu Dhabi | ‍–‍52 kg |
European Junior Championships
| Bronze medal – third place | 2013 Sarajevo | ‍–‍52 kg |
| Bronze medal – third place | 2015 Oberwart | ‍–‍52 kg |
Mediterranean Games
| Gold medal – first place | 2018 Tarragona | ‍–‍52 kg |
| Gold medal – first place | 2022 Oran | ‍–‍52 kg |
Jeux de la Francophonie
| Gold medal – first place | 2017 Abidjan | ‍–‍52 kg |

Profile at external databases
- IJF: 7829
- JudoInside.com: 75286
- Updated on 16 April 2026

Distria Krasniqi NK (Albanian pronunciation: [diˈstɾia kɾasˈnici]; born 10 December 1995) is a Kosovar judoka. She is a two-time Olympic medallist and won the gold medal in the women's 48-kg judo event at the 2020 Summer Olympics in Tokyo and the silver medal in the women's 52-kg judo event at the 2024 Summer Olympics in Paris. Krasniqi is also a two-time World Championships bronze medallist and three-time European champion. In August 2021, she was awarded the Honour of the Nation Decoration of Albania by the President of Albania.

== Career ==
Krasniqi took up the sport at the age of seven and was encouraged by her brother with whom she practiced the sport.

In mid-2018, Krasniqi switched to the super lightweight category of 48 kilograms from 52 kg event after missing out on qualifying for the 2016 Summer Olympics. As a result, she avoided her fellow Kosovan teammate and 2016 Olympic champion Majlinda Kelmendi in the light weight division, as well as Nora Gjakova, the 2018 European light weight champion in the qualification round for the 2020 Olympic Games.

Krasniqi won bronze medal in the 48 kg category at the 2019 World Championships. In 2020, she won one of the bronze medals in the women's 48 kg event at the 2020 European Championships held in Prague, Czech Republic. In 2021, she won the gold medal in her event at the 2021 World Masters held in Doha, Qatar.

Krasniqi represented Kosovo at the 2020 Summer Olympics held in Tokyo, Japan which also marked her debut appearance at the Olympics and claimed a gold medal in the women's 48kg event.

She won the Female Athlete of the Year award at the 2021 Judo Awards.

Krasniqi won the silver medal in her event at the 2022 Paris Grand Slam held in Paris, France. She won the gold medal in the women's 52 kg event at the 2022 Mediterranean Games held in Oran, Algeria.

Krasniqi lost her bronze medal match with Japanese judoka Uta Abe in the women's 52 kg event at the 2023 World Championships held in Doha, Qatar.

Representing Kosovo at the 2024 Summer Olympics held in Paris, France, Krasniqi won the silver medal in the women's 52 kg event.

In November 2025, Krasniqi won the gold medal at the 2025 Zagreb Grand Prix in Zagreb, Croatia.
