= Odette Giuffrida =

Italian judoka (born 1994)

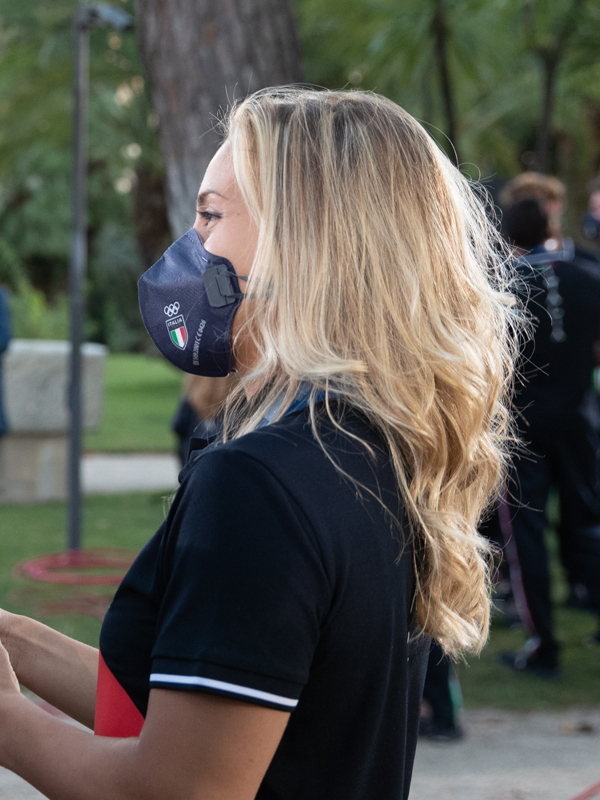
- Giuffrida awarded at Quirinale Palace in 2021

Personal information
- Born: 12 October 1994 (age 31) Rome, Italy
- Occupation: Judoka

Sport
- Country: Italy
- Sport: Judo
- Weight class: ‍–‍52 kg
- Club: Gruppo Sportivo Esercito

Achievements and titles
- Olympic Games: (silver) (2016)
- World Champ.: (gold) (2024)
- European Champ.: (gold) (2020)
Medal record
Women's judo
Representing Italy
Olympic Games
Silver medal – second place	2016 Rio de Janeiro	‍–‍52 kg
Bronze medal – third place	2020 Tokyo	‍–‍52 kg
World Championships
Gold medal – first place	2024 Abu Dhabi	‍–‍52 kg
Bronze medal – third place	2023 Doha	‍–‍52 kg
Bronze medal – third place	2026 Baku	‍–‍52 kg
European Games
Bronze medal – third place	2023 Kraków	Mixed team
European Championships
Gold medal – first place	2020 Prague	‍–‍52 kg
Silver medal – second place	2021 Lisbon	‍–‍52 kg
Silver medal – second place	2024 Zagreb	‍–‍52 kg
Silver medal – second place	2025 Podgorica	‍–‍52 kg
Silver medal – second place	2025 Podgorica	Mixed team
Bronze medal – third place	2026 Tbilisi	‍–‍52 kg
World Masters
Bronze medal – third place	2015 Rabat	‍–‍52 kg
Bronze medal – third place	2016 Guadalajara	‍–‍52 kg
Bronze medal – third place	2022 Jerusalem	‍–‍52 kg
IJF Grand Slam
Gold medal – first place	2018 Abu Dhabi	‍–‍52 kg
Gold medal – first place	2019 Brasilia	‍–‍52 kg
Gold medal – first place	2021 Tbilisi	‍–‍52 kg
Gold medal – first place	2023 Astana	‍–‍52 kg
Gold medal – first place	2023 Abu Dhabi	‍–‍52 kg
Gold medal – first place	2026 Dushanbe	‍–‍52 kg
Silver medal – second place	2016 Baku	‍–‍52 kg
Silver medal – second place	2019 Abu Dhabi	‍–‍52 kg
Silver medal – second place	2020 Paris	‍–‍52 kg
Silver medal – second place	2024 Baku	‍–‍52 kg
Silver medal – second place	2026 Ulaanbaatar	‍–‍52 kg
Bronze medal – third place	2019 Paris	‍–‍52 kg
Bronze medal – third place	2019 Düsseldorf	‍–‍52 kg
Bronze medal – third place	2022 Tel Aviv	‍–‍52 kg
Bronze medal – third place	2022 Antalya	‍–‍52 kg
Bronze medal – third place	2022 Abu Dhabi	‍–‍52 kg
Bronze medal – third place	2022 Baku	‍–‍52 kg
Bronze medal – third place	2023 Tel Aviv	‍–‍52 kg
Bronze medal – third place	2023 Baku	‍–‍52 kg
Bronze medal – third place	2025 Abu Dhabi	‍–‍52 kg
Bronze medal – third place	2026 Tashkent	‍–‍52 kg
Bronze medal – third place	2026 Budapest	‍–‍52 kg
IJF Grand Prix
Gold medal – first place	2016 Tbilisi	‍–‍52 kg
Gold medal – first place	2019 Tbilisi	‍–‍52 kg
Silver medal – second place	2014 Samsun	‍–‍52 kg
Silver medal – second place	2014 Budapest	‍–‍52 kg
Bronze medal – third place	2015 Tbilisi	‍–‍52 kg
Bronze medal – third place	2016 Havana	‍–‍52 kg
Bronze medal – third place	2017 Cancún	‍–‍52 kg
European U23 Championships
Bronze medal – third place	2011 Tyumen	‍–‍48 kg
Bronze medal – third place	2012 Prague	‍–‍52 kg
Bronze medal – third place	2013 Samokov	‍–‍52 kg
Bronze medal – third place	2014 Wrocław	‍–‍52 kg
World Juniors Championships
Bronze medal – third place	2013 Ljubljana	‍–‍52 kg
European Junior Championships
Gold medal – first place	2013 Sarajevo	‍–‍52 kg
Gold medal – first place	2014 Bucharest	‍–‍52 kg
World Cadets Championships
Silver medal – second place	2009 Budapest	‍–‍48 kg
European Cadet Championships
Gold medal – first place	2009 Koper	‍–‍48 kg
Gold medal – first place	2010 Teplice	‍–‍48 kg

Profile at external databases
- IJF: 3469
- JudoInside.com: 56830
- Updated on 6 October 2026

Odette Giuffrida (Italian pronunciation: [oˈdɛd dʒufˈfriːda]; (Note: In isolation, Odette is pronounced [oˈdɛt].) born 12 October 1994) is an Italian judoka. She won the gold medal in the women's 52 kg event at the 2024 World Judo Championships held in Abu Dhabi, United Arab Emirates. She competed at the 2023 World Judo Championships, where she placed third in the women's 52 kg.

== Career ==
She competed at the 2016 Summer Olympics in Rio de Janeiro, in the women's 52 kg event, in which she won the silver medal.

Giuffrida recompeted again at the 2020 Summer Olympics held in Tokyo, Japan, in the women's 52 kg event, where she won the bronze medal against Réka Pupp of Hungary.

She won one of the bronze medals in her event at the 2022 Judo Grand Slam Tel Aviv held in Tel Aviv, Israel. She also won one of the bronze medals in her event at the 2022 Judo Grand Slam Antalya held in Antalya, Turkey.

Giuffrida won the gold medal in the women's 52 kg event at the 2024 World Judo Championships held in Abu Dhabi, United Arab Emirates. She defeated Diyora Keldiyorova of Uzbekistan in her gold medal match.

== See also ==
- Italy at the 2020 Summer Olympics
