= Gultaj Mammadaliyeva =

Azerbaijani judoka

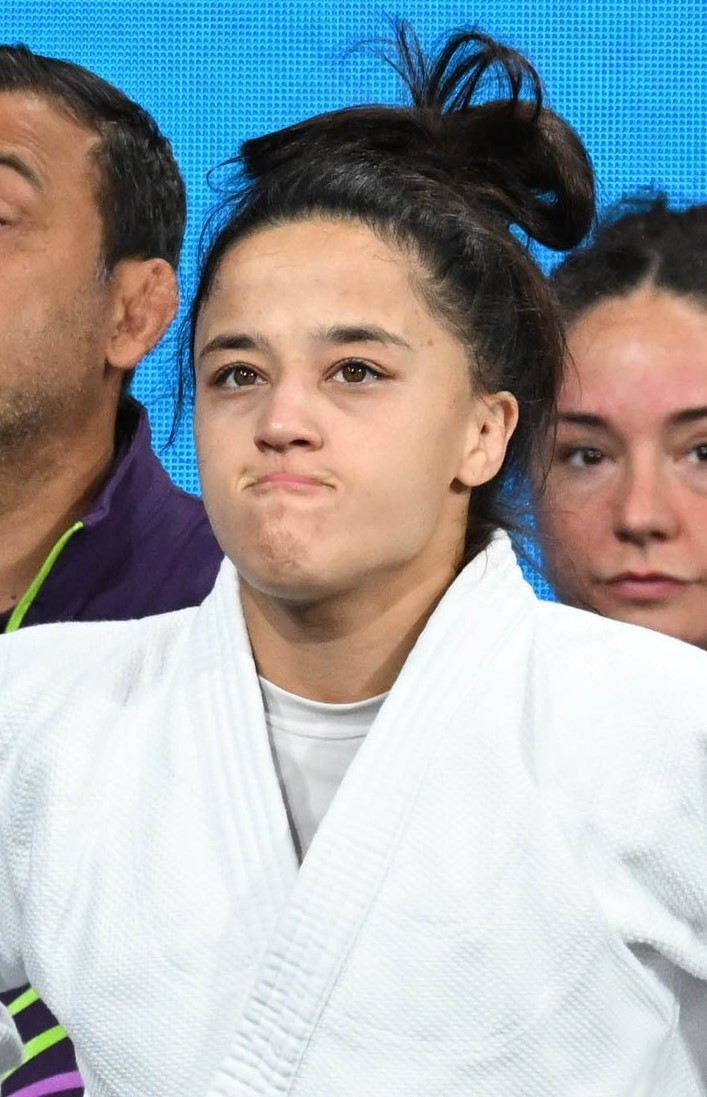
- Mammadaliyeva at the 2024 Summer Olympics

Personal information
- Native name: Gültac Məmmədəliyeva
- Born: 20 September 1999 (age 27)
- Occupation: Judoka

Sport
- Country: Azerbaijan
- Sport: Judo
- Weight class: ‍–‍52 kg

Achievements and titles
- Olympic Games: R32 (2024)
- World Champ.: 7th (2026)
- European Champ.: 7th (2019, 2023)
Medal record
Women's judo
Representing Azerbaijan
IJF Grand Slam
Bronze medal – third place	2023 Tbilisi	‍–‍52 kg
Bronze medal – third place	2023 Astana	‍–‍52 kg
IJF Grand Prix
Silver medal – second place	2023 Dushanbe	‍–‍52 kg
Bronze medal – third place	2019 Antalya	‍–‍52 kg
Bronze medal – third place	2023 Linz	‍–‍52 kg
Bronze medal – third place	2026 Zagreb	‍–‍52 kg
European U23 Championships
Silver medal – second place	2020 Poreč	‍–‍52 kg
European Junior Championships
Bronze medal – third place	2017 Maribor	‍–‍48 kg
Islamic Solidarity Games
Bronze medal – third place	2021 Konya	Women's team

Profile at external databases
- IJF: 20760
- JudoInside.com: 96677
- Updated on 15 November 2026

Gultaj Mais gizi Mammadaliyeva (Azerbaijani: Gültac Mais qızı Məmmədəliyeva; born 20 September 1999) is an Azerbaijani judoka, a member of the Azerbaijan national judo team, a two-time medalist at the Grand Slam tournaments, a three-time Grand Prix medalist, a bronze medalist in the team event at the 2021 Islamic Solidarity Games. Mammadaliyeva represented Azerbaijan at the 2024 Summer Olympics in Paris as the flagbearer.

== Biography ==
Gultaj Mammadaliyeva was born on 20 September 1999, in Sumgait. Before transitioning to professional judo, she played football professionally, representing various Azerbaijani teams such as U-15, U-17, U-19, and U-21. She played for the Sumgait football club.

At the 2017 European Junior Championships in Maribor, Mammadaliyeva won a bronze medal. In November 2018, she became the champion of Azerbaijan in the senior category. In April 2019, she claimed a bronze medal at the Antalya Grand Prix. In June of the same year, she won the European Open tournament in Cluj-Napoca. In November 2019, she earned a silver medal at the African Open in Yaoundé.

In 2020, at the European U23 Championships in Poreč, Mammadaliyeva won a silver medal. In March 2023, she secured a bronze medal at the Tbilisi Grand Slam. In May of the same year, she won a bronze medal at the Linz Grand Prix and a silver medal at the 2023 Dushanbe Grand Prix in June. That same month, she also won a bronze medal at the Astana Grand Slam, defeating Amber Ryheul from Belgium in the third-place match.

In July, Mammadaliyeva finished fifth at the Summer Universiade in Chengdu, where she was one of the flag bearers for the Azerbaijani delegation during the opening ceremony. She began the tournament with a win over an Italian athlete but lost in the quarterfinals to a judoka from Uzbekistan. In the repechage block, she defeated a competitor from France, but in the bronze medal match, she lost to German judoka Annika Würfel.

In November 2023, at the European Championships in Montpellier, Mammadaliyeva reached the quarterfinals but was defeated by Olympic champion Distria Krasniqi from Kosovo. In the repechage match, she lost to Hungarian judoka Réka Pupp, finishing in seventh place.

Her personal coach is Zaur Rajabli.
