= Estrella López Sheriff =

Spanish judoka (born 1992)

Personal information
- Born: 1 December 1992 (age 33)
- Occupation: Judoka

Sport
- Country: Spain
- Sport: Judo
- Weight class: ‍–‍52 kg

Achievements and titles
- World Champ.: R16 (2022)
- European Champ.: (bronze) (2020)
Medal record
Women's judo
Representing Spain
European Championships
Bronze medal – third place	2020 Prague	‍–‍52 kg
IJF Grand Slam
Silver medal – second place	2021 Antalya	‍–‍52 kg
Bronze medal – third place	2018 Düsseldorf	‍–‍52 kg
Bronze medal – third place	2022 Tbilisi	‍–‍52 kg
IJF Grand Prix
Silver medal – second place	2017 The Hague	‍–‍52 kg
Silver medal – second place	2023 Almada	‍–‍52 kg
Bronze medal – third place	2019 Marrakesh	‍–‍52 kg

Profile at external databases
- IJF: 3238
- JudoInside.com: 56728
- Updated on 28 January 2023

Estrella López Sheriff (born 1 December 1992) is a Spanish judoka.

López Sheriff is a bronze medalist from the 2020 European Judo Championships in the ‍–‍52 kg category.
