= Róza Gyertyás =

Hungary judoka (born 2001)

Personal information
- Born: 14 December 2001 (age 24)
- Occupation: Judoka

Sport
- Country: Hungary
- Sport: Judo
- Weight class: ‍–‍52 kg

Achievements and titles
- World Champ.: (bronze) (2025)
- European Champ.: 5th (2025)
Medal record
Women's judo
Representing Hungary
World Championships
Bronze medal – third place	2025 Budapest	‍–‍52 kg
IJF Grand Slam
Bronze medal – third place	2024 Baku	‍–‍52 kg
Bronze medal – third place	2024 Abu Dhabi	‍–‍52 kg
Bronze medal – third place	2026 Abu Dhabi	‍–‍52 kg
IJF Grand Prix
Gold medal – first place	2026 Zagreb	‍–‍52 kg
Silver medal – second place	2023 Linz	‍–‍52 kg
Silver medal – second place	2026 Linz	‍–‍52 kg
Bronze medal – third place	2025 Qingdao	‍–‍52 kg
Bronze medal – third place	2025 Zagreb	‍–‍52 kg
European U23 Championships
Gold medal – first place	2022 Sarajevo	‍–‍52 kg
Gold medal – first place	2023 Potsdam	‍–‍52 kg
World University Games
Silver medal – second place	2025 Essen	‍–‍57 kg
Bronze medal – third place	2021 Chengdu	‍–‍52 kg

Profile at external databases
- IJF: 30300
- JudoInside.com: 103939
- Updated on 15 November 2026

Róza Gyertyás (born 14 December 2001) is a Hungarian judoka. She won a bronze medal at the 2025 World Judo Championships.
