= Réka Pupp =

Hungarian judoka (born 1996)

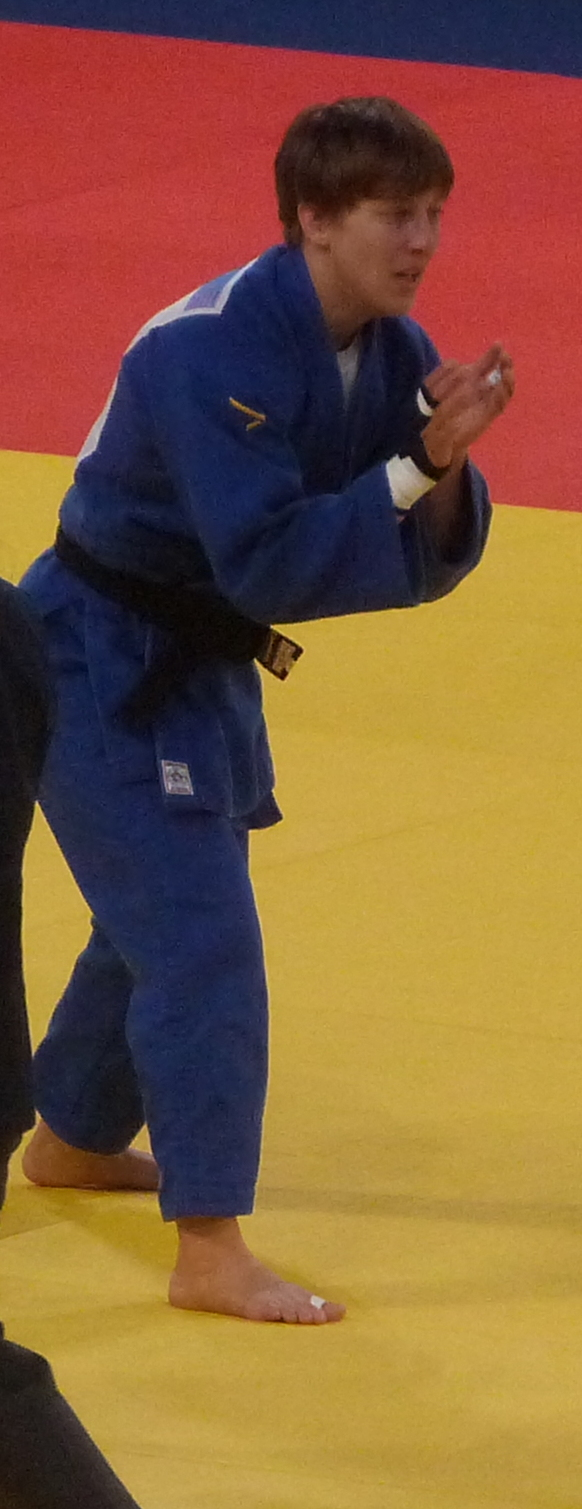
- Pupp in 2024

Personal information
- Born: 4 July 1996 (age 29) Dunaujvaros, Hungary
- Occupation: Judoka

Sport
- Country: Hungary
- Sport: Judo
- Weight class: ‍–‍52 kg

Achievements and titles
- Olympic Games: 5th (2020, 2024)
- World Champ.: 5th (2023, 2024)
- European Champ.: (bronze) (2021, 2024)
Medal record
Women's judo
Representing Hungary
European Championships
Bronze medal – third place	2021 Lisbon	‍–‍52 kg
Bronze medal – third place	2024 Zagreb	‍–‍52 kg
World Masters
Bronze medal – third place	2022 Jerusalem	‍–‍52 kg
IJF Grand Slam
Gold medal – first place	2021 Baku	‍–‍52 kg
Gold medal – first place	2022 Antalya	‍–‍52 kg
Gold medal – first place	2022 Budapest	‍–‍52 kg
Silver medal – second place	2017 Baku	‍–‍52 kg
Silver medal – second place	2022 Tbilisi	‍–‍52 kg
Silver medal – second place	2023 Paris	‍–‍52 kg
Silver medal – second place	2025 Abu Dhabi	‍–‍52 kg
Bronze medal – third place	2021 Tel Aviv	‍–‍52 kg
Bronze medal – third place	2021 Tbilisi	‍–‍52 kg
Bronze medal – third place	2022 Tel Aviv	‍–‍52 kg
Bronze medal – third place	2023 Tashkent	‍–‍52 kg
Bronze medal – third place	2023 Antalya	‍–‍52 kg
Bronze medal – third place	2023 Ulaanbaatar	‍–‍52 kg
Bronze medal – third place	2023 Baku	‍–‍52 kg
Bronze medal – third place	2026 Ulaanbaatar	‍–‍52 kg
IJF Grand Prix
Silver medal – second place	2017 Zagreb	‍–‍52 kg
Silver medal – second place	2024 Odivelas	‍–‍52 kg
Silver medal – second place	2025 Zagreb	‍–‍52 kg
Bronze medal – third place	2018 Antalya	‍–‍52 kg
Bronze medal – third place	2018 The Hague	‍–‍52 kg
European U23 Championships
Silver medal – second place	2016 Tel Aviv	‍–‍48 kg
Silver medal – second place	2018 Győr	‍–‍52 kg
Bronze medal – third place	2015 Bratislava	‍–‍48 kg
European Junior Championships
Gold medal – first place	2015 Oberwart	‍–‍48 kg
Bronze medal – third place	2012 Poreč	‍–‍44 kg
Bronze medal – third place	2014 Bucharest	‍–‍48 kg
Bronze medal – third place	2016 Málaga	‍–‍48 kg
European Cadet Championships
Bronze medal – third place	2012 Bar	‍–‍44 kg

Profile at external databases
- IJF: 7837
- JudoInside.com: 65779
- Updated on 19 June 2026

Réka Pupp (born 4 July 1996) is a Hungarian judoka. She is a two-time bronze medalist at the European Judo Championships and she competed at multiple editions of the World Judo Championships. She also represented Hungary at the 2020 Summer Olympics in Tokyo, Japan and the European Games in 2015 and 2019.

== Career ==
Pupp competed in the women's 52 kg event at the 2017 European Judo Championships held in Warsaw, Poland. She also competed in the women's 52 kg event at the 2017 World Judo Championships held in Budapest, Hungary where she was eliminated in her second match by Charline Van Snick of Belgium.

At the 2018 Judo Grand Prix Antalya held in Antalya, Turkey, she won one of the bronze medals in the women's 52 kg event. In that same year, she won the silver medal in the women's 52 kg event at the 2018 European U23 Judo Championships held in Győr, Hungary.

In 2019, Pupp competed in the women's 52 kg event at the World Judo Championships held in Tokyo, Japan. She also competed in the women's 52 kg event at the 2020 European Judo Championships held in Prague, Czech Republic.

In January 2021, Pupp competed in the women's 52 kg event at the Judo World Masters held in Doha, Qatar. A month later, she won one of the bronze medals in her event at the Judo Grand Slam Tel Aviv held in Tel Aviv, Israel. She repeated this at the 2021 Judo Grand Slam Tbilisi held in Tbilisi, Georgia. Her bronze medal streak continued a few weeks later in the women's 52 kg event at the 2021 European Judo Championships held in Lisbon, Portugal. In June 2021, she competed in the women's 52 kg event at the World Judo Championships held in Budapest, Hungary.

In 2021, Pupp lost her bronze medal match in the women's 52 kg event at the 2020 Summer Olympics in Tokyo, Japan. A few months later, she won the gold medal in her event at the 2021 Judo Grand Slam Baku held in Baku, Azerbaijan.

Pupp won one of the bronze medals in her event at the 2022 Judo Grand Slam Tel Aviv held in Tel Aviv, Israel. She won the gold medal in her event at the 2022 Judo Grand Slam Antalya held in Antalya, Turkey. She also won the gold medal in her event at the 2022 Judo Grand Slam Budapest held in Budapest, Hungary.

In 2023, Pupp lost her bronze medal match in the women's 52 kg event at the World Judo Championships held in Doha, Qatar. She won one of the bronze medals in the women's 52 kg event at 2024 European Judo Championships held in Zagreb, Croatia.

Pupp lost her bronze medal match in the women's 52 kg event at the 2024 Summer Olympics held in Paris, France.

== Personal life ==
Her sister, Noémi, is an Olympian canoeist who also competed in 2024.

== Achievements ==
Year	Tournament	Place	Weight class
2021	European Championships	3rd	−52 kg
2024	European Championships	3rd	−52 kg
