= Aleksandra Kaleta =

Polish judoka (born 1998)

Personal information
- Born: 5 March 1998 (age 28)
- Occupation: Judoka

Sport
- Country: Poland
- Sport: Judo
- Weight class: ‍–‍52 kg

Achievements and titles
- World Champ.: 7th (2022)
- European Champ.: 7th (2026)
Medal record
Women's judo
Representing Poland
IJF Grand Slam
Silver medal – second place	2026 Dushanbe	‍–‍52 kg
Bronze medal – third place	2021 Antalya	‍–‍52 kg
IJF Grand Prix
Bronze medal – third place	2023 Perth	‍–‍52 kg
World Juniors Championships
Bronze medal – third place	2018 Nassau	‍–‍52 kg

Profile at external databases
- IJF: 18433
- JudoInside.com: 90944
- Updated on 2 May 2026

Aleksandra Kaleta (born 5 March 1998) is a Polish judoka who competes at international judo competitions. She is a 2018 World Junior bronze medalist and has won a bronze medal at the 2021 Antalya Grand Slam in Turkey.
