= Sofia Asvesta =

Cypriot judoka (born 2000)

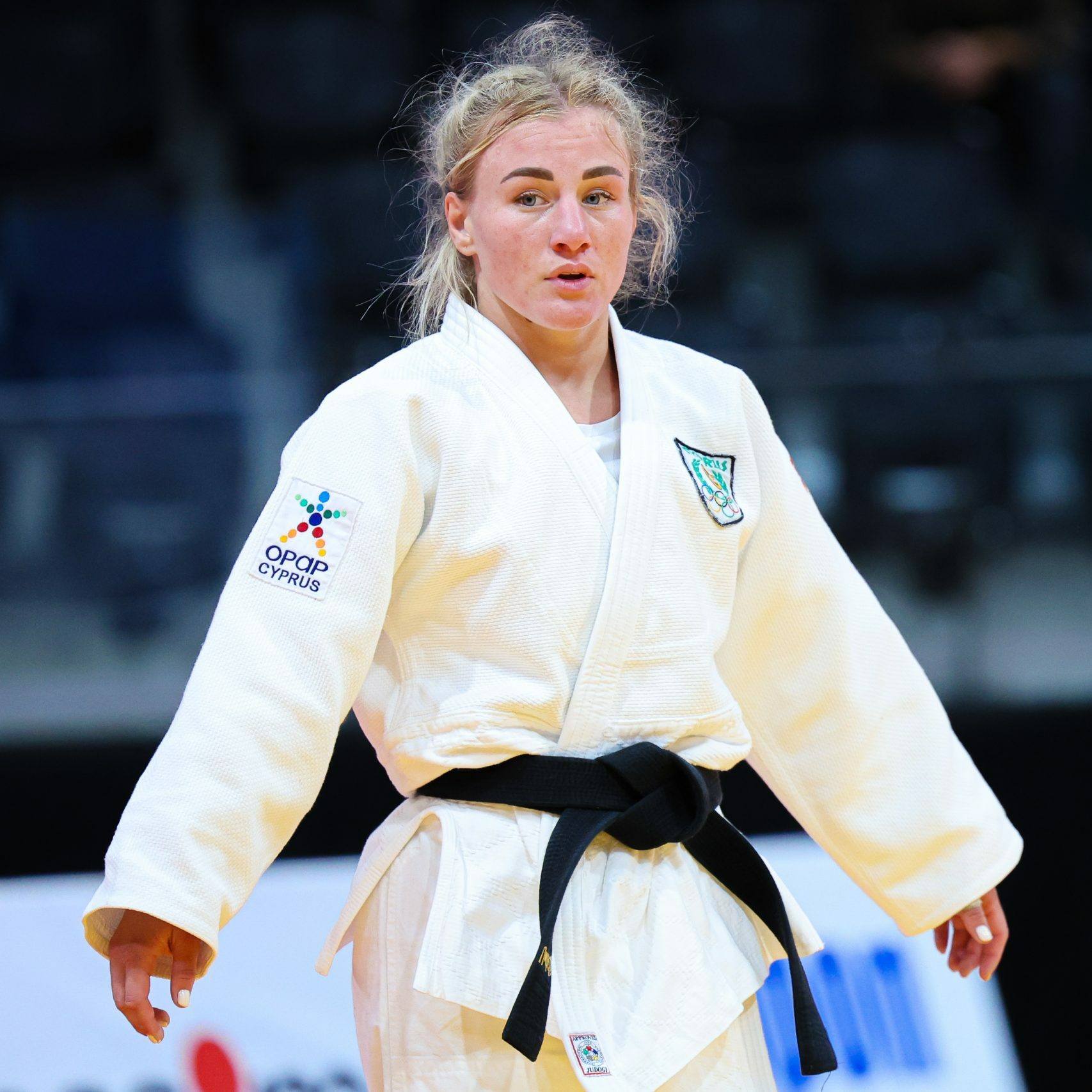

Personal information
- Native name: София Асвеста
- Nickname: "Sonya"
- Born: 5 June 2000 (age 26) Limassol, Cyprus
- Occupation: Judoka
- Height: 150 cm (4 ft 11 in)

Sport
- Country: Cyprus
- Sport: Judo
- Weight class: ‍–‍52 kg
- Rank: 1st dan black belt
- Club: Tuapse sport school #1 (Tuapse); Christodoulides judo academy (Nicosia)
- Coached by: Christodoulos Christodoulides; Dzhanbolet Naguchev

Achievements and titles
- Olympic Games: R16 (2024)
- World Champ.: R16 (2026)
- European Champ.: 5th (2024)
- Commonwealth Games: (silver) (2026)
Medal record
Women's judo
Representing Cyprus
European Junior Championships
| Bronze medal – third place | 2020 Poreč | ‍–‍52 kg |
Commonwealth Games
| Silver medal – second place | 2026 Glasgow | ‍–‍52 kg |
Mediterranean Games
| Gold medal – first place | 2026 Taranto | ‍–‍52 kg |

Profile at external databases
- IJF: 28908
- JudoInside.com: 107052
- Updated on 5 October 2026

Sofia "Sonya" Asvesta (Russian: София Асвеста, Greek: Σοφία Ασβεστά; born 5 June 2000) is a Cypriot judoka of Russian heritage. She participated at the 2024 Paris Olympics, has twice been national champion, and was the 2020 European junior bronze medalist.

== Background ==
Sofia Asvesta was born in Limassol, Cyprus, into a Cypriot/Russian family. She started judo under her first coach Pieros Leonida at the age of 15, then moved to Nicosia and joined the "Christodoulides judo academy".

== Career ==
She has twice been junior Cypriot national champion. As a senior athlete, she won national titles in 2018 and 2022. In 2020, Asvesta received a bronze medal at the European junior championships in Poreč, Croatia. In 2021, she came in third place at the senior European cup in Dubrovnik, Croatia. In January 2024, she earned a quota place for Cyprus for the 2024 Summer Olympics held in Paris, France. At the 2024 Summer Olympics, she won her first bout against Morocco's Soumiya Iraoui, but in the next round she was eliminated by Amandine Buchard of France and finished in the 9th place.

== Achievements ==
- 2018, 2020 Junior Cypriot championships — 1st.
- 2019 Junior European cup — 1st.
- 2020 European Junior Judo Championships — 3rd.
- 2018, 2022 Senior Cypriot championships — 1st.
- 2024 Judo Grand Slam Dushanbe — 5th.
- 2024 European Judo Championships — 5th.
- 2024 Summer Olympics — 9th.

== Personal life ==
She lives in Tuapse, Russia and trains with senior 2024 world championships runner-up Timur Arbuzov. Asvesta is of Russian descent, but was born in Cyprus and represents Cyprus internationally. She is a dual citizen of Cyprus and the Russian Federation.
