= Nouchi =

Nouchi may refer to:

== People ==
- Aimi Nouchi (born 1996), Japanese judoka
- Lenni Nouchi (born 2003), French rugby union player

== Other uses ==
- Nouchi language, a variety of African French
