= Taroh Fujisaka =

Japanese judoka (born 1994)

Personal information
- Nationality: Japanese
- Born: 6 June 1994 (age 32)
- Occupation: Judoka

Sport
- Country: Japan
- Sport: Judo
- Weight class: ‍–‍66 kg

Achievements and titles
- Asian Champ.: (bronze) (2017)
Medal record
Men's judo
Representing Japan
Asian Championships
Bronze medal – third place	2017 Hong Kong	‍–‍66 kg
IJF Grand Prix
Silver medal – second place	2015 Jeju	‍–‍66 kg
Silver medal – second place	2018 Tunis	‍–‍66 kg
Bronze medal – third place	2016 Budapest	‍–‍66 kg

Profile at external databases
- IJF: 28721
- JudoInside.com: 100958
- Updated on 5 December 2022

Taroh Fujisaka (born 6 June 1994) is a Japanese judoka.

Fujisaka won the silver medal in the ‍–‍66 kg category the 2018 Judo Grand Prix Tunis.
