= 2008 European Cadet Judo Championships =

Judo competition

Judo 2008 European Cadet Judo Championships
- Location: Sarajevo, Bosnia and Herzegovina
- Dates: 4–6 July 2008

Competition at external databases
- Links: EJU • JudoInside

The 2008 European Cadet Judo Championships is an edition of the European Cadet Judo Championships, organised by the International Judo Federation. It was held in Sarajevo, Bosnia and Herzegovina from 4 to 6 July 2008.

== Medal summary ==
=== Medal table ===
* Host nation (Bosnia and Herzegovina)

Rank	Nation	Gold	Silver	Bronze	Total
1	Russia (RUS)	4	5	3	12
2	Germany (GER)	3	0	5	8
3	Netherlands (NED)	1	3	3	7
4	Turkey (TUR)	1	2	2	5
5	Italy (ITA)	1	1	1	3
6	Georgia (GEO)	1	1	0	2
7	France (FRA)	1	0	3	4
8	Austria (AUT)	1	0	2	3
8	Azerbaijan (AZE)	1	0	2	3
10	Greece (GRE)	1	0	0	1
10	Sweden (SWE)	1	0	0	1
12	Poland (POL)	0	1	3	4
13	Latvia (LAT)	0	1	1	2
14	Hungary (HUN)	0	1	0	1
14	Romania (ROU)	0	1	0	1
16	Ukraine (UKR)	0	0	3	3
17	Belgium (BEL)	0	0	1	1
17	Bulgaria (BUL)	0	0	1	1
17	Estonia (EST)	0	0	1	1
17	Moldova (MDA)	0	0	1	1
Totals (20 entries)		16	16	32	64

=== Men's events ===
Event	Gold	Silver	Bronze
−50 kg	Aram Grigoryan (RUS)	Shmagi Lagazauri (GEO)	Łukasz Kiełbasiński (POL)
−50 kg	Aram Grigoryan (RUS)	Shmagi Lagazauri (GEO)	Nikita Lopouhhov (EST)
−55 kg	Vugar Shirinli (AZE)	Ayvengo Shabiev (RUS)	Dumitru Bulai (MDA)
−55 kg	Vugar Shirinli (AZE)	Ayvengo Shabiev (RUS)	Vincent Limare (FRA)
−60 kg	Arbi Khamkhoev (RUS)	Ramazan Zengi (TUR)	Fagan Eminoglu (AZE)
−60 kg	Arbi Khamkhoev (RUS)	Ramazan Zengi (TUR)	Vyacheslav Kabardinov (UKR)
−66 kg	Alexios Ntanatsidis (GRE)	Kamal Baikulov (RUS)	Muhammed Duman (TUR)
−66 kg	Alexios Ntanatsidis (GRE)	Kamal Baikulov (RUS)	Sascha Herkenrath (GER)
−73 kg	Alan Betanov (RUS)	Massimiliano Carollo (ITA)	Max Muensterberg (GER)
−73 kg	Alan Betanov (RUS)	Massimiliano Carollo (ITA)	Arturs Kurbanovs (LAT)
−81 kg	Giorgi Mermanishvili (GEO)	Kazbek Gazgireev (RUS)	Stanislav Retinskii (UKR)
−81 kg	Giorgi Mermanishvili (GEO)	Kazbek Gazgireev (RUS)	Dylan Van Nuffel (BEL)
−90 kg	Shamil Magomedov (RUS)	Gábor Vér (HUN)	Jonas Bauer (GER)
−90 kg	Shamil Magomedov (RUS)	Gábor Vér (HUN)	Jakub Zarzeczny (POL)
+90 kg	Domenico Di Guida (ITA)	Emils Vilcans (LAT)	Sven Heinle (GER)
+90 kg	Domenico Di Guida (ITA)	Emils Vilcans (LAT)	Feyyaz Yazıcı (TUR)

=== Women's events ===
Event	Gold	Silver	Bronze
−40 kg	Ebru Sahin (TUR)	Venera Nizamova (RUS)	Diana Galukh (UKR)
−40 kg	Ebru Sahin (TUR)	Venera Nizamova (RUS)	Suzanne Zegers (NED)
−44 kg	Nicola Weiglein (GER)	Cristina Raluca Dumitrascu (ROU)	Alesya Kuznetsova (RUS)
−44 kg	Nicola Weiglein (GER)	Cristina Raluca Dumitrascu (ROU)	Laura Prince (NED)
−48 kg	Sanne Verhagen (NED)	Tuğba Zehir (TUR)	Alana Lazarova (RUS)
−48 kg	Sanne Verhagen (NED)	Tuğba Zehir (TUR)	Louise Raynaud (FRA)
−52 kg	Emma Barkeling (SWE)	Bauke Groothuis (NED)	Sonia Arduini (ITA)
−52 kg	Emma Barkeling (SWE)	Bauke Groothuis (NED)	Maria Ertl (GER)
−57 kg	Clarisse Agbegnenou (FRA)	Halima Mohamed-Seghir (POL)	Jaime-Lee Leonora (NED)
−57 kg	Clarisse Agbegnenou (FRA)	Halima Mohamed-Seghir (POL)	Tina Zeltner (AUT)
−63 kg	Kathrin Unterwurzacher (AUT)	Britt Heskes (NED)	Sabina Nurgalina (RUS)
−63 kg	Kathrin Unterwurzacher (AUT)	Britt Heskes (NED)	Khanim Huseynova (AZE)
−70 kg	Miriam Dunkel (GER)	Paula van Dommelen (NED)	Laura Derai (FRA)
−70 kg	Miriam Dunkel (GER)	Paula van Dommelen (NED)	Bernadette Graf (AUT)
+70 kg	Zita Notter (GER)	Yana Pertseva (RUS)	Tereza Dzhurova (BUL)
+70 kg	Zita Notter (GER)	Yana Pertseva (RUS)	Kamila Wasek (POL)

Source Results
