= 2015 European U23 Judo Championships =

Judo competition

Judo 2015 European U23 Judo Championships
- Venue: Gopass Arena
- Location: Bratislava, Slovakia
- Dates: 13–15 November 2015
- Competitors: 320 from 36 nations

Competition at external databases
- Links: IJF • JudoInside

The 2015 European U23 Judo Championships is an edition of the European U23 Judo Championships, organised by the European Judo Union. It was held in Bratislava, Slovakia from 13 to 15 November 2015.

== Medal summary ==
=== Medal table ===
* Host nation (Slovakia)

Rank	Nation	Gold	Silver	Bronze	Total
1	Russia (RUS)	3	1	3	7
2	Germany (GER)	3	0	2	5
3	Italy (ITA)	1	1	3	5
4	Ukraine (UKR)	1	1	1	3
5	Poland (POL)	1	0	5	6
6	Hungary (HUN)	1	0	4	5
7	Czech Republic (CZE)	1	0	0	1
7	Great Britain (GBR)	1	0	0	1
7	Serbia (SRB)	1	0	0	1
7	Slovenia (SLO)	1	0	0	1
11	Croatia (CRO)	0	5	1	6
12	Netherlands (NED)	0	1	3	4
13	Azerbaijan (AZE)	0	1	2	3
14	Belarus (BLR)	0	1	1	2
15	Bosnia and Herzegovina (BIH)	0	1	0	1
15	Bulgaria (BUL)	0	1	0	1
15	Israel (ISR)	0	1	0	1
18	Spain (ESP)	0	0	2	2
19	Finland (FIN)	0	0	1	1
Totals (19 entries)		14	14	28	56

=== Men's events ===
Event	Gold	Silver	Bronze
Extra-lightweight (−60 kg)	Islam Yashuev (RUS)	Davud Mammadsoy (AZE)	Tornike Tsjakadoea (NED)
Extra-lightweight (−60 kg)	Islam Yashuev (RUS)	Davud Mammadsoy (AZE)	Matthijs van Harten (NED)
Half-lightweight (−66 kg)	Fabio Basile (ITA)	Dzmitry Minkou (BLR)	Islam Khametov (RUS)
Half-lightweight (−66 kg)	Fabio Basile (ITA)	Dzmitry Minkou (BLR)	Telman Valiyev (AZE)
Lightweight (−73 kg)	Anthony Zingg (GER)	Antonio Esposito (ITA)	Hidayat Heydarov (AZE)
Lightweight (−73 kg)	Anthony Zingg (GER)	Antonio Esposito (ITA)	Artem Khomula (UKR)
Half-middleweight (−81 kg)	Aslan Lappinagov (RUS)	Ivaylo Ivanov (BUL)	Dominik Družeta (CRO)
Half-middleweight (−81 kg)	Aslan Lappinagov (RUS)	Ivaylo Ivanov (BUL)	Karol Kurzej (POL)
Middleweight (−90 kg)	David Klammert (CZE)	Rico Harder (NED)	Michel Verhagen (NED)
Middleweight (−90 kg)	David Klammert (CZE)	Rico Harder (NED)	Nicholas Mungai (ITA)
Half-heavyweight (−100 kg)	Oleg Ishimov (RUS)	Zlatko Kumrić (CRO)	Gergö Fogasy (HUN)
Half-heavyweight (−100 kg)	Oleg Ishimov (RUS)	Zlatko Kumrić (CRO)	Niyaz Bilalov (RUS)
Heavyweight (+100 kg)	Fedir Panko (UKR)	Andrii Koleśnyk (UKR)	Anton Krivickij (GER)
Heavyweight (+100 kg)	Fedir Panko (UKR)	Andrii Koleśnyk (UKR)	Bendegúz Demeter (HUN)

=== Women's events ===
Event	Gold	Silver	Bronze
Extra-lightweight (−48 kg)	Milica Nikolić (SRB)	Noa Minsker (ISR)	Cinta Garcia Mesa (ESP)
Extra-lightweight (−48 kg)	Milica Nikolić (SRB)	Noa Minsker (ISR)	Réka Pupp (HUN)
Half-lightweight (−52 kg)	Karolina Pieńkowska (POL)	Tena Šikić (CRO)	Sofia Hogrefe (ESP)
Half-lightweight (−52 kg)	Karolina Pieńkowska (POL)	Tena Šikić (CRO)	Katri Kakko (FIN)
Lightweight (−57 kg)	Sappho Coban (GER)	Anastasia Konkina (RUS)	Anna Kuczera (POL)
Lightweight (−57 kg)	Sappho Coban (GER)	Anastasia Konkina (RUS)	Arleta Podolak (POL)
Half-middleweight (−63 kg)	Amy Livesey (GBR)	Maja Blagojevic (CRO)	Daniela Kazanoi (BLR)
Half-middleweight (−63 kg)	Amy Livesey (GBR)	Maja Blagojevic (CRO)	Martina Greci (ITA)
Middleweight (−70 kg)	Szabina Gercsák (HUN)	Aleksandra Samardzic (BIH)	Urszula Hofman (POL)
Middleweight (−70 kg)	Szabina Gercsák (HUN)	Aleksandra Samardzic (BIH)	Lea Pueschel (GER)
Half-heavyweight (−78 kg)	Klara Apotekar (SLO)	Brigita Matić-Ljuba (CRO)	Evelin Salánki (HUN)
Half-heavyweight (−78 kg)	Klara Apotekar (SLO)	Brigita Matić-Ljuba (CRO)	Melora Rosetta (ITA)
Heavyweight (+78 kg)	Carolin Weiß (GER)	Ivana Šutalo (CRO)	Aydana Nagorova (RUS)
Heavyweight (+78 kg)	Carolin Weiß (GER)	Ivana Šutalo (CRO)	Beata Pacut (POL)

Source Results
