= Anna Kuczera =

Polish judoka (born 1994)

Personal information
- Born: 4 July 1994 (age 31)
- Occupation: Judoka

Sport
- Country: Poland
- Sport: Judo
- Weight class: ‍–‍57 kg

Achievements and titles
- World Champ.: R16 (2021)
- European Champ.: 7th (2019)
Medal record
Women's judo
Representing Poland
IJF Grand Prix
Gold medal – first place	2017 Tashkent	‍–‍57 kg
Silver medal – second place	2019 Marrakesh	‍–‍57 kg
European U23 Championships
Bronze medal – third place	2015 Bratislava	‍–‍57 kg
European Junior Championships
Gold medal – first place	2014 Bucharest	‍–‍57 kg

Profile at external databases
- IJF: 17208
- JudoInside.com: 68078
- Updated on 29 November 2022

Anna Kuczera (née Borowska; born 4 July 1994) is a Polish judoka.

Kuczera is the gold medalist of the 2017 Judo Grand Prix Tashkent in the ‍–‍57 kg category.
