= Stanislav Semenov =

Russian judoka (born 1990)

Personal information
- Born: 8 December 1990 (age 35)
- Occupation: Judoka

Sport
- Country: Russia
- Sport: Judo
- Weight class: ‍–‍81 kg
Medal record
Men's judo
Representing Russia
IJF Grand Slam
Bronze medal – third place	2013 Moscow	‍–‍81 kg
Bronze medal – third place	2014 Tyumen	‍–‍81 kg
Bronze medal – third place	2016 Tyumen	‍–‍81 kg
IJF Grand Prix
Gold medal – first place	2017 Antalya	‍–‍81 kg
Gold medal – first place	2018 Tunis	‍–‍81 kg
European U23 Championships
Silver medal – second place	2012 Prague	‍–‍81 kg
Bronze medal – third place	2011 Tyumen	‍–‍81 kg

Profile at external databases
- IJF: 9257
- JudoInside.com: 57745
- Updated on 25 November 2022

Stanislav Semonov (born 8 December 1990) is a Russian judoka.

Semonov is the gold medalist of the 2018 Judo Grand Prix Tunis in the ‍–‍81 kg category.
