= 2012 European U23 Judo Championships =

Judo competition

Judo 2012 European U23 Judo Championships
- Venue: Sport Complex Arena Sparta
- Location: Prague, Czech Republic
- Dates: 16–18 November 2012

Competition at external databases
- Links: JudoInside

The 2012 European U23 Judo Championships is an edition of the European U23 Judo Championships, organised by the European Judo Union. It was held in Prague, Czech Republic from 16 to 18 November 2012.

== Medal summary ==
=== Medal table ===
* Host nation (Czech Republic)

Rank	Nation	Gold	Silver	Bronze	Total
1	Russia (RUS)	3	3	4	10
2	Netherlands (NED)	2	1	1	4
3	Hungary (HUN)	2	0	2	4
4	Poland (POL)	1	1	1	3
5	Slovenia (SLO)	1	0	2	3
6	Kosovo (KOS)	1	0	1	2
6	Turkey (TUR)	1	0	1	2
8	Belarus (BLR)	1	0	0	1
8	Bosnia and Herzegovina (BIH)	1	0	0	1
8	Czech Republic (CZE)*	1	0	0	1
11	Ukraine (UKR)	0	4	1	5
12	Germany (GER)	0	1	5	6
13	Italy (ITA)	0	1	4	5
14	Armenia (ARM)	0	1	1	2
15	Austria (AUT)	0	1	0	1
15	Croatia (CRO)	0	1	0	1
17	Belgium (BEL)	0	0	2	2
18	Azerbaijan (AZE)	0	0	1	1
18	Bulgaria (BUL)	0	0	1	1
18	Romania (ROU)	0	0	1	1
Totals (20 entries)		14	14	28	56

=== Men's events ===
Event	Gold	Silver	Bronze
Extra-lightweight (−60 kg)	Aram Grigoryan (RUS)	Gevorg Khachatrian (UKR)	Orkhan Safarov (AZE)
Extra-lightweight (−60 kg)	Aram Grigoryan (RUS)	Gevorg Khachatrian (UKR)	Fabio Basile (ITA)
Half-lightweight (−66 kg)	Vadzim Shoka (BLR)	Gor Harutyunyan (ARM)	Zsolt Gorjánácz (HUN)
Half-lightweight (−66 kg)	Vadzim Shoka (BLR)	Gor Harutyunyan (ARM)	Abdula Abdulzhalilov (RUS)
Lightweight (−73 kg)	Damian Szwarnowiecki (POL)	Andrea Regis (ITA)	Bayram Ceylan (TUR)
Lightweight (−73 kg)	Damian Szwarnowiecki (POL)	Andrea Regis (ITA)	Igor Wandtke (GER)
Half-middleweight (−81 kg)	Alan Khubetsov (RUS)	Stanislav Semenov (RUS)	Artyom Baghdasaryan (ARM)
Half-middleweight (−81 kg)	Alan Khubetsov (RUS)	Stanislav Semenov (RUS)	Massimiliano Carollo (ITA)
Middleweight (−90 kg)	Magomed Magomedov III (RUS)	Quedjau Nhabali (UKR)	Krisztián Tóth (HUN)
Middleweight (−90 kg)	Magomed Magomedov III (RUS)	Quedjau Nhabali (UKR)	Noël van 't End (NED)
Half-heavyweight (−100 kg)	Lukáš Krpálek (CZE)	Tomasz Domanski (POL)	Dmytro Luchyn (UKR)
Half-heavyweight (−100 kg)	Lukáš Krpálek (CZE)	Tomasz Domanski (POL)	Karl-Richard Frey (GER)
Heavyweight (+100 kg)	Roy Meyer (NED)	Magomed Nazhmudinov (RUS)	Benjamin Harmegnies (BEL)
Heavyweight (+100 kg)	Roy Meyer (NED)	Magomed Nazhmudinov (RUS)	André Breitbarth (GER)

=== Women's events ===
Event	Gold	Silver	Bronze
Extra-lightweight (−48 kg)	Dilara Lokmanhekim (TUR)	Irina Dolgova (RUS)	Kay Kraus (GER)
Extra-lightweight (−48 kg)	Dilara Lokmanhekim (TUR)	Irina Dolgova (RUS)	Alesya Kuznetsova (RUS)
Half-lightweight (−52 kg)	Majlinda Kelmendi (KOS)	Mariia Buiok (UKR)	Distria Krasniqi (KOS)
Half-lightweight (−52 kg)	Majlinda Kelmendi (KOS)	Mariia Buiok (UKR)	Odette Giuffrida (ITA)
Lightweight (−57 kg)	Juul Franssen (NED)	Sanne Verhagen (NED)	Ivelina Ilieva (BUL)
Lightweight (−57 kg)	Juul Franssen (NED)	Sanne Verhagen (NED)	Loredana Ohai (ROU)
Half-middleweight (−63 kg)	Nina Milošević (SLO)	Kathrin Unterwurzacher (AUT)	Valentina Giorgis (ITA)
Half-middleweight (−63 kg)	Nina Milošević (SLO)	Kathrin Unterwurzacher (AUT)	Tina Trstenjak (SLO)
Middleweight (−70 kg)	Franciska Szabó (HUN)	Barbara Matić (CRO)	Lola Mansour (BEL)
Middleweight (−70 kg)	Franciska Szabó (HUN)	Barbara Matić (CRO)	Irina Sordiya (RUS)
Half-heavyweight (−78 kg)	Abigél Joó (HUN)	Ivanna Makukha (UKR)	Anamari Velenšek (SLO)
Half-heavyweight (−78 kg)	Abigél Joó (HUN)	Ivanna Makukha (UKR)	Katarzyna Furmanek (POL)
Heavyweight (+78 kg)	Larisa Cerić (BIH)	Carolin Weiß (GER)	Jasmin Grabowski (GER)
Heavyweight (+78 kg)	Larisa Cerić (BIH)	Carolin Weiß (GER)	Aleksandra Babintseva (RUS)

Source Results
