= Kenta Nagasawa =

Japanese judoka (born 1993)

Personal information
- Nationality: Japanese
- Born: 8 December 1993 (age 32)
- Occupation: Judoka

Sport
- Country: Japan
- Sport: Judo
- Weight class: –90 kg

Achievements and titles
- World Champ.: (bronze) (2018)
Medal record
Men's judo
Representing Japan
World Championships
| Gold medal – first place | 2018 Baku | Mixed team |
| Gold medal – first place | 2021 Budapest | Mixed team |
| Bronze medal – third place | 2018 Baku | ‍–‍90 kg |
World Masters
| Bronze medal – third place | 2017 Saint Petersburg | ‍–‍90 kg |
IJF Grand Slam
| Gold medal – first place | 2017 Ekaterinburg | ‍–‍90 kg |
| Gold medal – first place | 2017 Tokyo | ‍–‍90 kg |
| Gold medal – first place | 2021 Tashkent | ‍–‍90 kg |
| Gold medal – first place | 2021 Paris | ‍–‍90 kg |
| Silver medal – second place | 2020 Paris | ‍–‍90 kg |
| Bronze medal – third place | 2016 Tyumen | ‍–‍90 kg |
| Bronze medal – third place | 2016 Tokyo | ‍–‍90 kg |
| Bronze medal – third place | 2019 Paris | ‍–‍90 kg |
IJF Grand Prix
| Gold medal – first place | 2015 Qingdao | ‍–‍90 kg |
| Gold medal – first place | 2019 Hohhot | ‍–‍90 kg |
| Bronze medal – third place | 2022 Zagreb | ‍–‍90 kg |
Summer Universiade
| Bronze medal – third place | 2015 Gwangju | ‍–‍90 kg |

Profile at external databases
- IJF: 17727
- JudoInside.com: 87536
- Updated on 23 May 2023

Kenta Nagasawa (長澤 憲大, Nagasawa Kenta; born 8 December 1993) is a Japanese judoka.

== Career ==
He participated at the 2018 World Judo Championships, winning a medal.
