= Arbi Khamkhoev =

Russian judoka

Personal information
- Nationality: Russian
- Born: 1 August 1993 (age 32)
- Occupation: Judoka

Sport
- Country: Russia
- Sport: Judo
- Weight class: –73 kg
Medal record
Men's judo
Representing Russia
IJF Grand Slam
Silver medal – second place	2016 Tyumen	–73 kg
IJF Grand Prix
Bronze medal – third place	2016 Zagreb	–73 kg
World Cadets Championships
Gold medal – first place	2009 Budapest	–66 kg
European Cadet Championships
Gold medal – first place	2008 Sarajevo	–60 kg
Gold medal – first place	2009 Koper	–66 kg

Profile at external databases
- IJF: 23910
- JudoInside.com: 51136
- Updated on 24 November 2022

Arbi Khamkhoev (born 1 August 1993) is a Russian judoka.

He is the bronze medallist of the 2016 Judo Grand Prix Zagreb in the -73 kg category.
