= Alexios Ntanatsidis =

Greek judoka (born 1993)

Alexios Ntanatsidis OLY
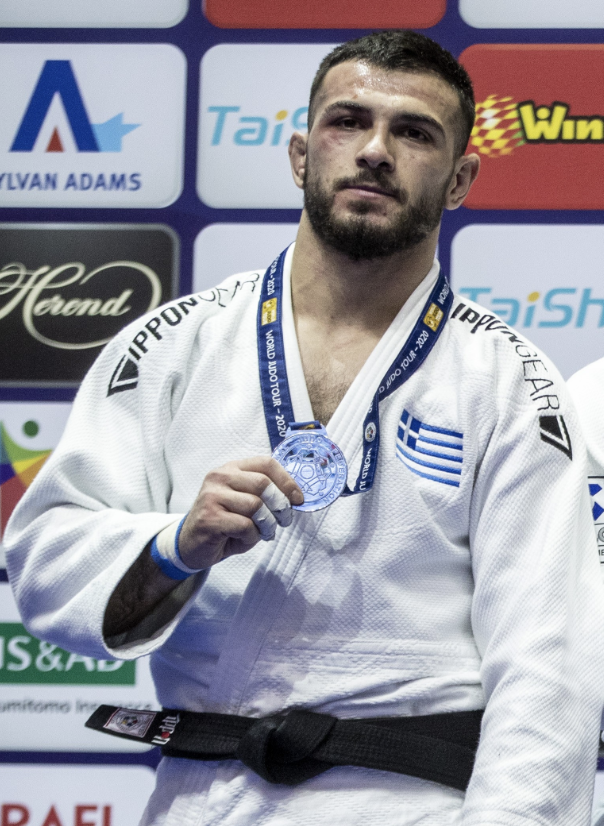
- Ntanatsidis at the 2020 Tel Aviv Grand Prix

Personal information
- Born: 20 June 1993 (age 33) Athens, Greece
- Occupation: Judoka
- Height: 1.78 m (5 ft 10 in)

Sport
- Country: Greece
- Sport: Judo
- Weight class: –81 kg

Achievements and titles
- Olympic Games: R32 (2020)
- World Champ.: R16 (2015, 2019, 2021)
- European Champ.: R16 (2018, 2019)
Medal record
Representing Greece
Men's judo
IJF Grand Prix
Gold medal – first place	2019 Perth	‍–‍81 kg
Silver medal – second place	2020 Tel Aviv	‍–‍81 kg
Bronze medal – third place	2018 Tashkent	‍–‍81 kg
Bronze medal – third place	2019 Marrakesh	‍–‍81 kg
World Juniors Championships
Gold medal – first place	2013 Ljubljana	‍–‍81 kg
Silver medal – second place	2013 Ljubljana	Men's team
European Junior Championships
Gold medal – first place	2012 Poreč	‍–‍81 kg
World Cadets Championships
Bronze medal – third place	2009 Budapest	‍–‍73 kg
European Cadet Championships
Gold medal – first place	2008 Sarajevo	‍–‍66 kg
Bronze medal – third place	2009 Koper	‍–‍73 kg
Mediterranean Games
Bronze medal – third place	2018 Tarragon	‍–‍81 kg
Men's sambo
World Championships
Silver medal – second place	2017 Sochi	‍–‍82 kg

Profile at external databases
- IJF: 3417
- JudoInside.com: 50158
- Updated on 21 May 2023

Alexios Ntanatsidis (born 20 June 1993) is a Greek judoka. He began his professional career at the age of 14 after joining the Greek Judoka National team and won a gold medal at the European Championships for cadets shortly after. In 2013, he won the gold medal at the U21 World Championships. In 2014, he won the bronze medal at the European Judo Open Championships. He also won a bronze medal at the 2018 Mediterranean Games. In recent years, he has won two bronze medals and one silver at various IJF Grand Prix and he has also won gold medals at the Asian and Oceanian Opens in 2018 and 2019 respectively. He represented Greece in the Tokyo 2020 Olympic Games.

== Personal life ==
Alexios was born in Hadik, in Georgia, a region in south Georgia which was founded by Greeks who moved from Pontos. He was raised in Athens. His parents enrolled him at a local judo club at a young age. He is 1.78 metres (5 ft 10 in) tall and weighs 81 kilograms (179 lb). Since 2022 he has been the national coach for Hellenic judo federation.
