= 2016 Judo Grand Prix Budapest =

Judo competition

Judo 2016 Judo Grand Prix Budapest
- Venue: László Papp Budapest Sports Arena
- Location: Budapest, Hungary
- Dates: 25–26 June 2016
- Competitors: 253 from 55 nations

Competition at external databases
- Links: IJF • EJU • JudoInside

The 2016 Judo Grand Prix Budapest was held at the László Papp Budapest Sports Arena in Budapest, Hungary from 25 to 26 June 2016.

== Medal summary ==
=== Men's events ===
| Event | Gold | Silver | Bronze |
|---|---|---|---|
| Extra-lightweight (−60 kg) | Dai Aoki (JPN) | Otar Bestaev (KGZ) | Sharafuddin Lutfillaev (UZB) |
| Extra-lightweight (−60 kg) | Dai Aoki (JPN) | Otar Bestaev (KGZ) | Cédric Revol (FRA) |
| Half-lightweight (−66 kg) | Adrian Gomboc (SLO) | Masaya Asari (JPN) | Rishod Sobirov (UZB) |
| Half-lightweight (−66 kg) | Adrian Gomboc (SLO) | Masaya Asari (JPN) | Taroh Fujisaka (JPN) |
| Lightweight (−73 kg) | Rok Drakšič (SLO) | Dmytro Kanivets (UKR) | Artem Khomula (UKR) |
| Lightweight (−73 kg) | Rok Drakšič (SLO) | Dmytro Kanivets (UKR) | Giorgi Katsiashvili (GEO) |
| Half-middleweight (−81 kg) | Ivan Nifontov (RUS) | Sven Maresch (GER) | Yasuhiro Ebi (JPN) |
| Half-middleweight (−81 kg) | Ivan Nifontov (RUS) | Sven Maresch (GER) | Attila Ungvári (HUN) |
| Middleweight (−90 kg) | Krisztián Tóth (HUN) | Mihael Žgank (SLO) | Kirill Denisov (RUS) |
| Middleweight (−90 kg) | Krisztián Tóth (HUN) | Mihael Žgank (SLO) | Célio Dias (POR) |
| Half-heavyweight (−100 kg) | Michael Korrel (NED) | Soyib Kurbonov (UZB) | Anton Savytskiy (UKR) |
| Half-heavyweight (−100 kg) | Michael Korrel (NED) | Soyib Kurbonov (UZB) | Philip Awiti-Alcaraz (GBR) |
| Heavyweight (+100 kg) | Stanislav Bondarenko (UKR) | Katsuma Ueda (JPN) | André Breitbarth (GER) |
| Heavyweight (+100 kg) | Stanislav Bondarenko (UKR) | Katsuma Ueda (JPN) | Nabil Zalagh (FRA) |

=== Women's events ===
| Event | Gold | Silver | Bronze |
|---|---|---|---|
| Extra-lightweight (−48 kg) | Hiromi Endō (JPN) | Romane Yvin (FRA) | Milica Nikolić (SRB) |
| Extra-lightweight (−48 kg) | Hiromi Endō (JPN) | Romane Yvin (FRA) | Taciana Cesar (GBS) |
| Half-lightweight (−52 kg) | Majlinda Kelmendi (KOS) | Distria Krasniqi (KOS) | Karolina Pieńkowska (POL) |
| Half-lightweight (−52 kg) | Majlinda Kelmendi (KOS) | Distria Krasniqi (KOS) | Alexandra-Larisa Florian (ROU) |
| Lightweight (−57 kg) | Momo Tamaoki (JPN) | Nae Udaka (JPN) | Marti Malloy (USA) |
| Lightweight (−57 kg) | Momo Tamaoki (JPN) | Nae Udaka (JPN) | Telma Monteiro (POR) |
| Half-middleweight (−63 kg) | Nami Nabekura (JPN) | Tina Trstenjak (SLO) | Amy Livesey (GBR) |
| Half-middleweight (−63 kg) | Nami Nabekura (JPN) | Tina Trstenjak (SLO) | Katharina Haecker (AUS) |
| Middleweight (−70 kg) | Elvismar Rodríguez (VEN) | Laura Vargas Koch (GER) | Gulnoza Matniyazova (UZB) |
| Middleweight (−70 kg) | Elvismar Rodríguez (VEN) | Laura Vargas Koch (GER) | María Pérez (PUR) |
| Half-heavyweight (−78 kg) | Kayla Harrison (USA) | Anamari Velenšek (SLO) | Karen Stevenson (NED) |
| Half-heavyweight (−78 kg) | Kayla Harrison (USA) | Anamari Velenšek (SLO) | Abigél Joó (HUN) |
| Heavyweight (+78 kg) | Carolin Weiß (GER) | Ma Sisi (CHN) | Yu Song (CHN) |
| Heavyweight (+78 kg) | Carolin Weiß (GER) | Ma Sisi (CHN) | Iryna Kindzerska (UKR) |

Source Results

=== Medal table ===
* Host nation (Hungary)

| Rank | Nation | Gold | Silver | Bronze | Total |
|---|---|---|---|---|---|
| 1 | Japan (JPN) | 4 | 3 | 2 | 9 |
| 2 | Slovenia (SLO) | 2 | 3 | 0 | 5 |
| 3 | Germany (GER) | 1 | 2 | 1 | 4 |
| 4 | Ukraine (UKR) | 1 | 1 | 3 | 5 |
| 5 | Kosovo (KOS) | 1 | 1 | 0 | 2 |
| 6 | Hungary (HUN)* | 1 | 0 | 2 | 3 |
| 7 | Netherlands (NED) | 1 | 0 | 1 | 2 |
| 7 | Russia (RUS) | 1 | 0 | 1 | 2 |
| 7 | United States (USA) | 1 | 0 | 1 | 2 |
| 10 | Venezuela (VEN) | 1 | 0 | 0 | 1 |
| 11 | Uzbekistan (UZB) | 0 | 1 | 3 | 4 |
| 12 | France (FRA) | 0 | 1 | 2 | 3 |
| 13 | China (CHN) | 0 | 1 | 1 | 2 |
| 14 | Kyrgyzstan (KGZ) | 0 | 1 | 0 | 1 |
| 15 | Great Britain (GBR) | 0 | 0 | 2 | 2 |
| 15 | Portugal (POR) | 0 | 0 | 2 | 2 |
| 17 | Australia (AUS) | 0 | 0 | 1 | 1 |
| 17 | Georgia (GEO) | 0 | 0 | 1 | 1 |
| 17 | Guinea-Bissau (GBS) | 0 | 0 | 1 | 1 |
| 17 | Poland (POL) | 0 | 0 | 1 | 1 |
| 17 | Puerto Rico (PUR) | 0 | 0 | 1 | 1 |
| 17 | Romania (ROU) | 0 | 0 | 1 | 1 |
| 17 | Serbia (SRB) | 0 | 0 | 1 | 1 |
| Totals (23 entries) | | 14 | 14 | 28 | 56 |
