= Daria Kurbonmamadova =

Russian judoka (born 1994)

Personal information
- Native name: Дарья Евгеньевна Курбонмамадова
- Full name: Daria Yevgenyevna Kurbonmamadova
- Born: Daria Mezhetskaia; 24 June 1994 (age 32) Perm, Russia
- Occupation: Judoka

Sport
- Country: Russia
- Sport: Judo
- Weight class: ‍–‍57 kg
- Club: CSKA

Achievements and titles
- Olympic Games: R32 (2020)
- World Champ.: 7th (2019)
- European Champ.: (gold) (2019, 2023)
Medal record
Women's judo
Representing Individual Neutral Athletes
European Championships
Gold medal – first place	2023 Montpellier	‍–‍57 kg
IJF Grand Prix
Silver medal – second place	2024 Odivelas	‍–‍57 kg
Representing the IJF
European Championships
Bronze medal – third place	2025 Podgorica	Mixed team
IJF Grand Slam
Silver medal – second place	2022 Ulaanbaatar	‍–‍57 kg
Representing Russia
European Games
Gold medal – first place	2019 Minsk	‍–‍57 kg
Gold medal – first place	2019 Minsk	Mixed team
IJF Grand Slam
Silver medal – second place	2016 Tyumen	‍–‍57 kg
Silver medal – second place	2021 Kazan	‍–‍57 kg
Bronze medal – third place	2021 Tbilisi	‍–‍57 kg
IJF Grand Prix
Silver medal – second place	2016 Zagreb	‍–‍57 kg
Silver medal – second place	2019 Tel Aviv	‍–‍57 kg
Silver medal – second place	2019 Hohhot	‍–‍57 kg
European U23 Championships
Bronze medal – third place	2016 Tel Aviv	‍–‍57 kg
World Juniors Championships
Bronze medal – third place	2014 Fort Lauderdale	‍–‍57 kg
European Junior Championships
Silver medal – second place	2013 Sarajevo	‍–‍57 kg

Profile at external databases
- IJF: 14916
- JudoInside.com: 65203
- Updated on 27 January 2024

Daria Yevgenyevna Kurbonmamadova, née Mezhetskaia (Russian: Дарья Евгеньевна Курбонмамадова, born 24 June 1994) is a Russian judoka who won the European Judo Championships in 2019 and 2023.

Kurbonmamadova won a bronze medal at the mixed team event of the 2019 World Judo Championships. She competed in the women's 57 kg event at the 2020 Summer Olympics held in Tokyo, Japan.

Kurbonmamadova is linked with the Russian Armed Forces through being member of CSKA.
