= Maike Ziech =

German judoka (born 1993)

Personal information
- Born: 10 September 1993 (age 32)
- Occupation: Judoka

Sport
- Country: Germany
- Sport: Judo
- Weight class: ‍–‍78 kg
Medal record
Women's judo
Representing Germany
IJF Grand Prix
Gold medal – first place	2018 Agadir	‍–‍78 kg
Bronze medal – third place	2019 Montreal	‍–‍78 kg
European U23 Championships
Gold medal – first place	2014 Wrocław	‍–‍78 kg
European Junior Championships
Gold medal – first place	2012 Poreč	‍–‍78 kg
European Cadet Championships
Silver medal – second place	2009 Koper	‍–‍70 kg
Summer Universiade
Bronze medal – third place	2015 Gwangju	‍–‍78 kg
Bronze medal – third place	2017 Taipei	‍–‍78 kg

Profile at external databases
- IJF: 14683
- JudoInside.com: 49921
- Updated on 29 November 2022

Maike Ziech (born 10 September 1993) is a German judoka.

Ziech is the gold medalist of the 2018 Judo Grand Prix Agadir in the ‍–‍78 kg category.
