= Judo at the 2015 Summer Universiade =

Judo competition

Judo Judo at the 2015 Summer Universiade
- Venue: Yeomju Bitgoeul Gymnasium
- Location: Gwangju, South Korea
- Dates: 4–8 July 2015

Medalists
gold medal	South Korea (3rd title)
silver medal	Japan
bronze medal	Russia

Champions
- Men's team: Japan (6th title)
- Women's team: Japan (5th title)

Competition at external databases
- Links: EJU • JudoInside

Judo was contested at the 2015 Summer Universiade at the Yeomju Bitgoeul Gymnasium in Gwangju, South Korea from 4 to 8 July 2015.

== Medal summary ==
=== Medal table ===
* Host nation (South Korea)

Rank	Nation	Gold	Silver	Bronze	Total
1	South Korea*	8	5	2	15
2	Japan	7	2	6	15
3	Russia	1	3	6	10
4	France	1	2	3	6
5	Mongolia	1	0	1	2
6	Brazil	0	1	3	4
7	Romania	0	1	2	3
7	Ukraine	0	1	2	3
9	China	0	1	1	2
10	Croatia	0	1	0	1
10	Estonia	0	1	0	1
12	Germany	0	0	3	3
13	Lithuania	0	0	2	2
14	Azerbaijan	0	0	1	1
14	Italy	0	0	1	1
14	Kazakhstan	0	0	1	1
14	Netherlands	0	0	1	1
14	Switzerland	0	0	1	1
Totals (18 entries)		18	18	36	72

=== Men's events ===
Event	Gold	Silver	Bronze
Bantamweight 60 kg	Kim Won-jin; South Korea	Yuma Oshima; Japan	Phelipe Pelim; Brazil
Bantamweight 60 kg	Kim Won-jin; South Korea	Yuma Oshima; Japan	Albert Oguzov; Russia
Featherweight 66 kg	An Baul; South Korea	Alexandre Mariac; France	Matteo Piras; Italy
Featherweight 66 kg	An Baul; South Korea	Alexandre Mariac; France	Anzaur Ardanov; Russia
Lightweight 73 kg	An Chang-rim; South Korea	Dmytro Kanivets; Ukraine	Yuji Yamamoto; Japan
Lightweight 73 kg	An Chang-rim; South Korea	Dmytro Kanivets; Ukraine	Huseyn Rahimli; Azerbaijan
Welterweight 81 kg	Khasan Khalmurzaev; Russia	Wang Ki-chun; South Korea	Jonathan Allardon; France
Welterweight 81 kg	Khasan Khalmurzaev; Russia	Wang Ki-chun; South Korea	Kenya Kohara; Japan
Middleweight 90 kg	Gwak Dong-han; South Korea	Khusen Khalmurzaev; Russia	Gustavo Assis; Brazil
Middleweight 90 kg	Gwak Dong-han; South Korea	Khusen Khalmurzaev; Russia	Kenta Nagasawa; Japan
Light heavyweight -100 kg	Cho Gu-ham; South Korea	Clément Delvert; France	Dino Pfeiffer; Germany
Light heavyweight -100 kg	Cho Gu-ham; South Korea	Clément Delvert; France	Niaz Bilalov; Russia
Heavyweight +100 kg	Hisayoshi Harasawa; Japan	Magomed Nazhmudinov; Russia	Nabil Zalagh; France
Heavyweight +100 kg	Hisayoshi Harasawa; Japan	Magomed Nazhmudinov; Russia	Vladut Simionescu; Romania
Open weight	Katsuma Ueda; Japan	Juhan Mettis; Estonia	Karolis Bauza; Lithuania
Open weight	Katsuma Ueda; Japan	Juhan Mettis; Estonia	Vladut Simionescu; Romania
Team	Japan (JPN); Gotō Ryūtarō; Kenya Kohara; Kenta Nagasawa; Yuma Oshima; Sho Tateyama; Katsuma Ueda; Yuji Yamamoto	South Korea (KOR); An Baul; An Chang-rim; Cho Gu-ham; Gwak Dong-han; Ji Geun-bae; Kim Soo-whan; Kim Won-jin; Wang Ki-chun	Ukraine (UKR); Artem Gulyayev; Bogdan Iadov; Mykhailo Ilytchuk; Dmytro Kanivets; Dmytro Luchyn; Fedir Panko; Anton Rudnyk; Denys Tolkach
Team	Japan (JPN); Gotō Ryūtarō; Kenya Kohara; Kenta Nagasawa; Yuma Oshima; Sho Tateyama; Katsuma Ueda; Yuji Yamamoto	South Korea (KOR); An Baul; An Chang-rim; Cho Gu-ham; Gwak Dong-han; Ji Geun-bae; Kim Soo-whan; Kim Won-jin; Wang Ki-chun	Russia (RUS); Anzaur Ardanov; Niiaz Bilalov; Khasan Khalmurzaev; Khusen Khalmurzaev; Magomed Nazhmudinov; Albert Oguzov; Zelimkhan Ozdoev; Stepan Sarkisian

=== Women's events ===
Event	Gold	Silver	Bronze
Bantamweight -48 kg	Jeong Bo-kyeong; South Korea	Gabriela Chibana; Brazil	Funa Tonaki; Japan
Bantamweight -48 kg	Jeong Bo-kyeong; South Korea	Gabriela Chibana; Brazil	Munkhbat Urantsetseg; Mongolia
Featherweight -52 kg	Mako Uchio; Japan	Alexandra Florian; Romania	Tetiana Levytska; Ukraine
Featherweight -52 kg	Mako Uchio; Japan	Alexandra Florian; Romania	Evelyne Tschopp; Switzerland
Lightweight -57 kg	Dorjsürengiin Sumiyaa; Mongolia	Andrea Bekic; Croatia	Kim Jan-di; South Korea
Lightweight -57 kg	Dorjsürengiin Sumiyaa; Mongolia	Andrea Bekic; Croatia	Anzu Yamamoto; Japan
Welterweight -63 kg	Megumi Tsugane; Japan	Bak Ji-yun; South Korea	Nadja Bazynski; Germany
Welterweight -63 kg	Megumi Tsugane; Japan	Bak Ji-yun; South Korea	Jennifer Wichers; Netherlands
Middleweight -70 kg	Kim Seong-yeon; South Korea	Kazuki Osanai; Japan	Zhanar Kashkyn; Kazakhstan
Middleweight -70 kg	Kim Seong-yeon; South Korea	Kazuki Osanai; Japan	Margaux Pinot; France
Light heavyweight -78 kg	Samah Hawa Camara; France	Alena Kachorovskaya; Russia	Park Yu-jin; South Korea
Light heavyweight -78 kg	Samah Hawa Camara; France	Alena Kachorovskaya; Russia	Maike Ziech; Germany
Heavyweight +78 kg	Sarah Asahina; Japan	Kim Min-jeong; South Korea	Santa Pakenytė; Lithuania
Heavyweight +78 kg	Sarah Asahina; Japan	Kim Min-jeong; South Korea	Kang Jie; China
Open weight	Kim Ji-youn; South Korea	Kang Jie; China	Aleksandra Babintseva; Russia
Open weight	Kim Ji-youn; South Korea	Kang Jie; China	Sara Yamamoto; Japan
Team	Japan (JPN); Sarah Asahina; Ayumi Hori; Kazuki Osanai; Funa Tonaki; Megumi Tsugane; Mako Uchio; Anzu Yamamoto; Sara Yamamoto	South Korea (KOR); Bak Ji-yun; Jeong Bo-kyeong; Kim Jan-di; Kim Ji-youn; Kim Min-jeong; Kim Seong-yeon; Kim Yu-ra; Park Yu-jin	Russia (RUS); Aleksandra Babintseva; Anna Dmitrieva; Alena Kachorovskaya; Anastasiia Konkina; Liliia Lotfullina; Aydana Nagorova; Aleksandra Prokopenko; Pari Surakatova
Team	Japan (JPN); Sarah Asahina; Ayumi Hori; Kazuki Osanai; Funa Tonaki; Megumi Tsugane; Mako Uchio; Anzu Yamamoto; Sara Yamamoto	South Korea (KOR); Bak Ji-yun; Jeong Bo-kyeong; Kim Jan-di; Kim Ji-youn; Kim Min-jeong; Kim Seong-yeon; Kim Yu-ra; Park Yu-jin	Brazil (BRA); Gabriela Chibana; Sibilla Faccholli; Flávia Gomes; Talita Morais; Amanda Oliveira; Jéssica Santos; Eleudis Valentim
