= Lola Mansour =

Belgian judoka (born 1993)

Personal information
- Born: 2 December 1993 (age 32) Brussels, Belgium
- Occupation: Judoka

Sport
- Country: Belgium
- Sport: Judo
- Weight class: –70 kg

Achievements and titles
- World Champ.: R64 (2015, 2017)
- European Champ.: R16 (2015)
Medal record
Women's judo
Representing Belgium
IJF Grand Prix
Bronze medal – third place	2017 Düsseldorf	–70 kg
European U23 Championships
Silver medal – second place	2014 Wrocław	–70 kg
Bronze medal – third place	2012 Prague	–70 kg
European Junior Championships
Gold medal – first place	2012 Poreč	–70 kg
Bronze medal – third place	2011 Lommel	–70 kg
World Cadets Championships
Silver medal – second place	2009 Budapest	–70 kg
Youth Olympic Games
Gold medal – first place	2010 Singapore	–78 kg

Profile at external databases
- IJF: 3677
- JudoInside.com: 48776
- Updated on 21 February 2022

Lola Mansour (born 2 December 1993 in Brussels) is a Belgian professional judoka, gold medalist at the Youth Olympic Games in Singapore (2010) and the European Junior Championships (2012). She is Belgian champion in her category (2012, 2014) in addition to international podiums between 2009 and 2018. Lola publishes her first novel Ceinture blanche (“White belt”) in 2018 following an accident that interrupts her sports career. As a feminist activist, ambassador of Give and Take and co-founder of the #BalanceTonSport movement, Lola aims at the empowerment of women for a more inclusive and egalitarian society.

== Judo career ==
Lola begins her judo training at the age of five and a half at Judo Club Ganshoren. She wins numerous medals in junior tournaments, including the gold medal at the 2010 Summer Youth Olympics and at the 2012 European Junior Judo Championships. She becomes Belgian champion in her category in 2012 and 2014, then participates in several major international tournaments winning her first medal in Tunis in January 2015.

On 21 February 2018, Lola suffers a severe concussion on the eve of the Düsseldorf Grand Slam while training for the 2020 Summer Olympics - an injury that leads to a complete interruption of her athletic activities and prevents her from competing for the next three and a half years. Her athletic recovery is not easy, but Lola manages to enlist the support of professionals who accompany her in her rehabilitation.

Thanks to the support of the Faculty of Motor Sciences at the Université Libre de Bruxelles, of Jean-François Lenvain through his Give and Take project, of the MentorYou program coordinated by the European Think & do tank Pour la Solidarité-PLS, and of her trainer Ilse Heylen, Olympic medallist at the 2004 Summer Olympics in Athens, Lola returns to the tatami. After two years of rehabilitation and three and a half years without major competition, she wins bronze at the Belgian championships in Herstal on November 11, 2021.

During her time away from sports, Lola has the opportunity to explore other interests: she resumes her writing hobby more seriously and becomes increasingly vocal about sexism and the invisibilization of women in high-performance sport.

== Writing and activism ==
Lola has been writing since she was 17 years old. What starts out as an occasional hobby, which combines perfectly with the hectic pace required by high-performance sport, eventually turns into a more serious activity that leads Lola to finalize her first novel entitled Ceinture blanche, which tells the story of a young girl's journey to become a champion.

With this work, Lola participates in the writing competition of the Laure Nobels Foundation and receives the Young Public Brabant Wallon prize on 7 October 2018 at the Castle of La Hulpe. Ceinture blanche was published the same year by Ker Éditions. The meeting with the Laure Nobels Foundation, founded by the parents of the writer Laure Nobels, victim of feminicide at the age of 16, shapes Lola.

On 22 December 2018, Lola participates in her first activist action for women's rights via the Foundation: Noël sans elles ("Christmas without them"), a tribute to the victims of feminicide. Later that year, in response to a gang rape in the public space in Brussels, Lola and several of her friends-turned-allies participate in the Belgian capital's main sporting event, the 20 km of Brussels, to deliver their message: "A woman, not a target".

During this event, Lola meets Jean-François Lenvain, former head of the social and educational unit of the Royal Sporting Club Anderlecht, initiator of the projects Tous à bord and Give and Take that support athletes. The former ultramarathoner not only helps Lola to spread her message but also offers to support her in her sports recovery by mobilizing his network and his community of sportsmen and women.

On the occasion of International Women's Day, 8 March 2021, Lola launches with her judoka colleague and activist Charline Van Snick the #BalanceTonSport movement, a continuation of #BalanceYourPorc to denounce sexist behaviors in sport. #BalanceTonSport is a collective of sportswomen (professional and amateur) who fight against all forms of discrimination and sexist violence with the guiding question: Was sport created by men for men?
