= Anton Krivobokov =

Russian judoka (born 1993)

Personal information
- Nationality: Russian
- Born: 9 April 1993 (age 33)
- Occupation: Judoka

Sport
- Country: Russia
- Sport: Judo
- Weight class: +100 kg
Medal record
Men's judo
Representing Russia
IJF Grand Slam
Silver medal – second place	2014 Baku	+100 kg
Bronze medal – third place	2017 Abu Dhabi	+100 kg
Bronze medal – third place	2019 Baku	+100 kg
IJF Grand Prix
Silver medal – second place	2014 Tbilisi	+100 kg
Silver medal – second place	2016 Qingdao	+100 kg
Silver medal – second place	2018 Agadir	+100 kg
Bronze medal – third place	2019 Tel Aviv	+100 kg
European U23 Championships
Gold medal – first place	2014 Wrocław	+100 kg
World Juniors Championships
Gold medal – first place	2013 Ljubljana	+100 kg
Bronze medal – third place	2011 Cape Town	+100 kg
European Junior Championships
Gold medal – first place	2013 Sarajevo	+100 kg
Bronze medal – third place	2012 Poreč	+100 kg
World Cadets Championships
Gold medal – first place	2009 Budapest	+90 kg
European Cadet Championships
Silver medal – second place	2009 Koper	+90 kg

Profile at external databases
- IJF: 3812
- JudoInside.com: 57200
- Updated on 21 May 2023

Anton Krivobokov (born 9 April 1993) is a Russian judoka.

He is the silver medallist of the 2014 Judo Grand Slam Baku in the +100 kg category.
