= Kenya Kohara =

Japanese judoka (born 1994)

Personal information
- Nationality: Japanese
- Born: 29 August 1994 (age 31)
- Occupation: Judoka

Sport
- Country: Japan
- Sport: Judo
- Weight class: ‍–‍81 kg

Achievements and titles
- Asian Champ.: R16 (2016)
Medal record
Men's judo
Representing Japan
IJF Grand Slam
| Gold medal – first place | 2022 Tokyo | ‍–‍81 kg |
| Gold medal – first place | 2023 Ulaanbaatar | ‍–‍81 kg |
| Silver medal – second place | 2018 Osaka | ‍–‍81 kg |
| Bronze medal – third place | 2017 Baku | ‍–‍81 kg |
| Bronze medal – third place | 2023 Baku | ‍–‍81 kg |
IJF Grand Prix
| Silver medal – second place | 2018 Budapest | ‍–‍81 kg |
| Bronze medal – third place | 2018 Tunis | ‍–‍81 kg |
World Juniors Championships
| Silver medal – second place | 2013 Ljubljana | ‍–‍81 kg |
Summer Universiade
| Bronze medal – third place | 2015 Gwangju | ‍–‍81 kg |

Profile at external databases
- IJF: 14818
- JudoInside.com: 74193
- Updated on 24 September 2023

Kenya Kohara (born 29 August 1994) is a Japanese judoka.

Kohara is the silver medalist of the 2018 Judo Grand Slam Osaka in the ‍–‍81 kg category.
