= Phridon Gigani =

Georgian judoka (born 1993)

Personal information
- Born: 2 March 1993 (age 33)
- Occupation: Judoka

Sport
- Country: Georgia
- Sport: Judo
- Weight class: ‍–‍73 kg
Medal record
Men's judo
Representing Georgia
IJF Grand Prix
Silver medal – second place	2018 Tbilisi	‍–‍73 kg
Bronze medal – third place	2016 Tbilisi	‍–‍73 kg
European Junior Championships
Silver medal – second place	2012 Poreč	‍–‍73 kg

Profile at external databases
- IJF: 9550
- JudoInside.com: 73176
- Updated on 18 November 2021

Phridon Gigani (born 2 March 1993) is a Georgian judoka.

Gigani is the silver medalist of the 2018 Judo Grand Prix Tbilisi in the ‍–‍73 kg category.
