= 2019 Judo Grand Slam Ekaterinburg =

Judo competition

Judo 2019 Judo Grand Slam Ekaterinburg
- Venue: Palace of Sports
- Location: Yekaterinburg, Russia
- Dates: 15–17 March 2019
- Competitors: 353 from 47 nations

Competition at external databases
- Links: IJF • EJU • JudoInside

The 2019 Judo Grand Slam Ekaterinburg was held in Yekaterinburg, Russia from 15 to 17 March 2019.

== Medal summary ==
=== Men's events ===
Event	Gold	Silver	Bronze
Extra-lightweight (−60 kg)	Lkhagvajamtsyn Önöbold (MGL)	Yuma Oshima (JPN)	Albert Oguzov (RUS)
Extra-lightweight (−60 kg)	Lkhagvajamtsyn Önöbold (MGL)	Yuma Oshima (JPN)	Tornike Tsjakadoea (NED)
Half-lightweight (−66 kg)	Kilian Le Blouch (FRA)	Isa Isaev (RUS)	Bagrati Niniashvili (GEO)
Half-lightweight (−66 kg)	Kilian Le Blouch (FRA)	Isa Isaev (RUS)	Baruch Shmailov (ISR)
Lightweight (−73 kg)	Tommy Macias (SWE)	Fabio Basile (ITA)	Behruzi Khojazoda (TJK)
Lightweight (−73 kg)	Tommy Macias (SWE)	Fabio Basile (ITA)	Evgeniy Prokopchuk (RUS)
Half-middleweight (−81 kg)	Sagi Muki (ISR)	Takanori Nagase (JPN)	Étienne Briand (CAN)
Half-middleweight (−81 kg)	Sagi Muki (ISR)	Takanori Nagase (JPN)	Luka Maisuradze (GEO)
Middleweight (−90 kg)	Noël van 't End (NED)	Beka Gviniashvili (GEO)	Rafael Macedo (BRA)
Middleweight (−90 kg)	Noël van 't End (NED)	Beka Gviniashvili (GEO)	Goki Tajima (JPN)
Half-heavyweight (−100 kg)	Arman Adamian (RUS)	Kirill Denisov (RUS)	Shady El Nahas (CAN)
Half-heavyweight (−100 kg)	Arman Adamian (RUS)	Kirill Denisov (RUS)	Peter Paltchik (ISR)
Heavyweight (+100 kg)	Tamerlan Bashaev (RUS)	Or Sasson (ISR)	David Moura (BRA)
Heavyweight (+100 kg)	Tamerlan Bashaev (RUS)	Or Sasson (ISR)	Rafael Silva (BRA)

=== Women's events ===
Event	Gold	Silver	Bronze
Extra-lightweight (−48 kg)	Paula Pareto (ARG)	Julia Figueroa (ESP)	Irina Dolgova (RUS)
Extra-lightweight (−48 kg)	Paula Pareto (ARG)	Julia Figueroa (ESP)	Milica Nikolić (SRB)
Half-lightweight (−52 kg)	Gili Cohen (ISR)	Ana Pérez Box (ESP)	Natalia Kuziutina (RUS)
Half-lightweight (−52 kg)	Gili Cohen (ISR)	Ana Pérez Box (ESP)	Charline Van Snick (BEL)
Lightweight (−57 kg)	Christa Deguchi (CAN)	Lien Chen-ling (TPE)	Haruka Funakubo (JPN)
Lightweight (−57 kg)	Christa Deguchi (CAN)	Lien Chen-ling (TPE)	Jessica Klimkait (CAN)
Half-middleweight (−63 kg)	Daria Davydova (RUS)	Lucy Renshall (GBR)	Catherine Beauchemin-Pinard (CAN)
Half-middleweight (−63 kg)	Daria Davydova (RUS)	Lucy Renshall (GBR)	Boldyn Gankhaich (MGL)
Middleweight (−70 kg)	Marie-Ève Gahié (FRA)	Maria Portela (BRA)	Assmaa Niang (MAR)
Middleweight (−70 kg)	Marie-Ève Gahié (FRA)	Maria Portela (BRA)	Shiho Tanaka (JPN)
Half-heavyweight (−78 kg)	Mao Izumi (JPN)	Mayra Aguiar (BRA)	Bernadette Graf (AUT)
Half-heavyweight (−78 kg)	Mao Izumi (JPN)	Mayra Aguiar (BRA)	Rika Takayama (JPN)
Heavyweight (+78 kg)	Maria Suelen Altheman (BRA)	Anne Fatoumata M'Bairo (FRA)	Sandra Jablonskytė (LTU)
Heavyweight (+78 kg)	Maria Suelen Altheman (BRA)	Anne Fatoumata M'Bairo (FRA)	Rochele Nunes (POR)

Source Results

=== Medal table ===
* Host nation (Russia)

Rank	Nation	Gold	Silver	Bronze	Total
1	Russia (RUS)*	3	2	4	9
2	Israel (ISR)	2	1	2	5
3	France (FRA)	2	1	0	3
4	Brazil (BRA)	1	2	4	7
4	Japan (JPN)	1	2	4	7
6	Canada (CAN)	1	0	4	5
7	Mongolia (MGL)	1	0	1	2
7	Netherlands (NED)	1	0	1	2
9	Argentina (ARG)	1	0	0	1
9	Sweden (SWE)	1	0	0	1
11	Spain (ESP)	0	2	0	2
12	Georgia (GEO)	0	1	2	3
13	Chinese Taipei (TPE)	0	1	0	1
13	Great Britain (GBR)	0	1	0	1
13	Italy (ITA)	0	1	0	1
16	Austria (AUT)	0	0	1	1
16	Belgium (BEL)	0	0	1	1
16	Lithuania (LTU)	0	0	1	1
16	Morocco (MAR)	0	0	1	1
16	Serbia (SRB)	0	0	1	1
16	Tajikistan (TJK)	0	0	1	1
Totals (21 entries)		14	14	28	56
