= Kang Jie =

Chinese judoka

Personal information
- Nationality: Chinese
- Born: 31 August 1988 (age 37)
- Occupation: Judoka

Sport
- Country: China
- Sport: Judo
- Weight class: +78 kg

Achievements and titles
- World Champ.: R16 (2013)
Medal record
Women's judo
Representing China
IJF Grand Prix
Bronze medal – third place	2011 Qingdao	+78 kg
Bronze medal – third place	2016 Qingdao	+78 kg
Summer Universiade
Silver medal – second place	2015 Gwangju	Open
Bronze medal – third place	2015 Gwangju	+78 kg

Profile at external databases
- IJF: 10074
- JudoInside.com: 55259
- Updated on 8 December 2022

Kang Jie (born 31 August 1988) is a Chinese judoka.

She is the bronze medallist of the 2016 Judo Grand Prix Qingdao in the +78 kg category.
