= Albert Oguzov =

Russian judoka (born 1991)

Personal information
- Born: 28 September 1991 (age 34)
- Occupation: Judoka

Sport
- Country: Russia
- Sport: Judo
- Weight class: –60 kg

Achievements and titles
- European Champ.: R16 (2019)
Medal record
Men's judo
Representing Russia
World Masters
Bronze medal – third place	2021 Doha	‍–‍60 kg
IJF Grand Slam
Silver medal – second place	2016 Tyumen	‍–‍60 kg
Silver medal – second place	2021 Baku	‍–‍60 kg
Bronze medal – third place	2016 Abu Dhabi	‍–‍60 kg
Bronze medal – third place	2017 Ekaterinburg	‍–‍60 kg
Bronze medal – third place	2019 Ekaterinburg	‍–‍60 kg
IJF Grand Prix
Gold medal – first place	2018 Antalya	‍–‍60 kg
Silver medal – second place	2018 Budapest	‍–‍60 kg
Bronze medal – third place	2017 Zagreb	‍–‍60 kg
Bronze medal – third place	2018 Hohhot	‍–‍60 kg
Bronze medal – third place	2019 Tel Aviv	‍–‍60 kg
Bronze medal – third place	2019 Hohhot	‍–‍60 kg
European U23 Championships
Silver medal – second place	2013 Samokov	‍–‍60 kg
Summer Universiade
Bronze medal – third place	2015 Gwangju	‍–‍60 kg
Bronze medal – third place	2017 Taipei	‍–‍60 kg

Profile at external databases
- IJF: 14391
- JudoInside.com: 85684
- Updated on 21 May 2023

Albert Oguzov (born 28 September 1991) is a Russian judoka. He won one of the bronze medals in his event at the 2021 Judo World Masters held in Doha, Qatar.
