= Yuma Oshima =

Japanese judoka (born 1995)

Personal information
- Nationality: Japanese
- Born: 7 January 1995 (age 31)
- Occupation: Judoka

Sport
- Country: Japan
- Sport: Judo
- Weight class: ‍–‍60 kg

Achievements and titles
- Asian Champ.: (bronze) (2016)
Medal record
Men's judo
Representing Japan
Asian Championships
Bronze medal – third place	2016 Tashkent	‍–‍60 kg
IJF Grand Slam
Gold medal – first place	2016 Tyumen	‍–‍60 kg
Silver medal – second place	2019 Ekaterinburg	‍–‍60 kg
Bronze medal – third place	2014 Tyumen	‍–‍60 kg
Bronze medal – third place	2014 Tokyo	‍–‍60 kg
Bronze medal – third place	2018 Ekaterinburg	‍–‍60 kg
Bronze medal – third place	2018 Osaka	‍–‍60 kg
IJF Grand Prix
Gold medal – first place	2015 Tashkent	‍–‍60 kg
Silver medal – second place	2014 Düsseldorf	‍–‍60 kg
World Juniors Championships
Bronze medal – third place	2013 Ljubljana	‍–‍60 kg
Asian Junior Championships
Gold medal – first place	2012 Taipei	‍–‍60 kg
World Cadets Championships
Gold medal – first place	2011 Kyiv	‍–‍60 kg
Summer Universiade
Silver medal – second place	2015 Gwangju	‍–‍60 kg

Profile at external databases
- IJF: 7348
- JudoInside.com: 66598
- Updated on 21 November 2022

Yuma Oshima (born 7 January 1995) is a Japanese judoka.

Oshima is the gold medalist of the 2016 Judo Grand Slam Tyumen in the ‍–‍60 kg category.
