= 2009 European Cadet Judo Championships =

Judo competition

Judo 2009 European Cadet Judo Championships
- Venue: Bonifika Hall
- Location: Koper, Slovenia
- Dates: 26–28 June 2009

Competition at external databases
- Links: EJU • JudoInside

The 2009 European Cadet Judo Championships is an edition of the European Cadet Judo Championships, organised by the International Judo Federation. It was held in Koper, Slovenia from 26 to 28 June 2009.

== Medal summary ==
=== Medal table ===
* Host nation (Slovenia)

Rank	Nation	Gold	Silver	Bronze	Total
1	Russia (RUS)	9	2	1	12
2	Italy (ITA)	2	0	0	2
3	Slovenia (SLO)*	1	1	0	2
4	Ukraine (UKR)	1	0	5	6
5	France (FRA)	1	0	3	4
6	Israel (ISR)	1	0	1	2
6	Lithuania (LTU)	1	0	1	2
8	Germany (GER)	0	4	1	5
9	Azerbaijan (AZE)	0	2	2	4
10	Turkey (TUR)	0	1	4	5
11	Belgium (BEL)	0	1	1	2
11	Greece (GRE)	0	1	1	2
13	Belarus (BLR)	0	1	0	1
13	Czech Republic (CZE)	0	1	0	1
13	Slovakia (SVK)	0	1	0	1
13	Spain (ESP)	0	1	0	1
17	Georgia (GEO)	0	0	3	3
18	Serbia (SRB)	0	0	2	2
19	Armenia (ARM)	0	0	1	1
19	Croatia (CRO)	0	0	1	1
19	Hungary (HUN)	0	0	1	1
19	Latvia (LAT)	0	0	1	1
19	Netherlands (NED)	0	0	1	1
19	Poland (POL)	0	0	1	1
19	Romania (ROU)	0	0	1	1
Totals (25 entries)		16	16	32	64

=== Men's events ===
Event	Gold	Silver	Bronze
−50 kg	Sakhavat Gadzhiev (RUS)	David Pulkrabek (CZE)	Dmytro Atanov (UKR)
−50 kg	Sakhavat Gadzhiev (RUS)	David Pulkrabek (CZE)	Kamran Bagirov (AZE)
−55 kg	Roman Buzuk (RUS)	Ahmet Sahin Kaba (TUR)	Lukhumi Chkhvimiani (GEO)
−55 kg	Roman Buzuk (RUS)	Ahmet Sahin Kaba (TUR)	Andriy Mykytyn (UKR)
−60 kg	Ayvengo Shabiev (RUS)	Georgios Azoidis (GRE)	Davit Ghazaryan (ARM)
−60 kg	Ayvengo Shabiev (RUS)	Georgios Azoidis (GRE)	Nurettin Aksu (TUR)
−66 kg	Arbi Khamkhoev (RUS)	Jalil Jalilov (AZE)	Dmitrijs Fedosejenkovs (LAT)
−66 kg	Arbi Khamkhoev (RUS)	Jalil Jalilov (AZE)	Irakli Lomidze (GEO)
−73 kg	Khasan Khalmurzaev (RUS)	Tadej Mulec (SLO)	Alexios Ntanatsidis (GRE)
−73 kg	Khasan Khalmurzaev (RUS)	Tadej Mulec (SLO)	Hermann Schener (GER)
−81 kg	Ali Erdogan (RUS)	Arpad Szakacs (SVK)	Batuhan Efemgil (TUR)
−81 kg	Ali Erdogan (RUS)	Arpad Szakacs (SVK)	Levani Ruadze (GEO)
−90 kg	Magomedrasul Gashimov (RUS)	Toma Nikiforov (BEL)	Zilvinas Lekavicius (LTU)
−90 kg	Magomedrasul Gashimov (RUS)	Toma Nikiforov (BEL)	Jurica Katic (CRO)
+90 kg	Yacov Mamistvalov (ISR)	Anton Krivobokov (RUS)	Alexis Dion (FRA)
+90 kg	Yacov Mamistvalov (ISR)	Anton Krivobokov (RUS)	Aleksander Nitek (POL)

=== Women's events ===
Event	Gold	Silver	Bronze
−40 kg	Venera Nizamova (RUS)	Sarah Vogel (GER)	Gundogdu Gül (TUR)
−40 kg	Venera Nizamova (RUS)	Sarah Vogel (GER)	Antonia Silaghi (ROU)
−44 kg	Evgenia Demintseva (RUS)	Katharina Pfeiffer (GER)	Ganna Gutsu (UKR)
−44 kg	Evgenia Demintseva (RUS)	Katharina Pfeiffer (GER)	Julijana Savic (SRB)
−48 kg	Odette Giuffrida (ITA)	Anna Dmitrieva (RUS)	Lien Moors (BEL)
−48 kg	Odette Giuffrida (ITA)	Anna Dmitrieva (RUS)	Bernadett Keliger (HUN)
−52 kg	Nataliya Ilkiv (UKR)	Alexandra Zwirner (GER)	Shafag Muradzade (AZE)
−52 kg	Nataliya Ilkiv (UKR)	Alexandra Zwirner (GER)	Daria Naidenko (RUS)
−57 kg	Margaux Pinot (FRA)	Daniela Kazanoi (BLR)	Dilara Incedayi (TUR)
−57 kg	Margaux Pinot (FRA)	Daniela Kazanoi (BLR)	Adi Zlochenko (ISR)
−63 kg	Renalda Gedutyte (LTU)	Khanim Huseynova (AZE)	Margriet Bergstra (NED)
−63 kg	Renalda Gedutyte (LTU)	Khanim Huseynova (AZE)	Nadege Merlet (FRA)
−70 kg	Valeria Ferrari (ITA)	Maike Ziech (GER)	Ivana Jandric (SRB)
−70 kg	Valeria Ferrari (ITA)	Maike Ziech (GER)	Krystyna Mykhailenko (UKR)
+70 kg	Urska Potocnik (SLO)	Aroa Martín Lara (ESP)	Kseniya Darchuk (UKR)
+70 kg	Urska Potocnik (SLO)	Aroa Martín Lara (ESP)	Madeleine Malonga (FRA)

Source Results
