= Judo at the 2019 European Games – Women's 57 kg =

Judo competition

Judo Women's 57 kg at the 2019 European Games
- Venue: Čyžoŭka-Arena
- Location: Minsk, Belarus
- Date: 22 June
- Competitors: 28 from 22 nations

Medalists
gold medal	Daria Mezhetskaia (1st title)	Russia
silver medal	Nora Gjakova	Kosovo
bronze medal	Pauline Starke	Germany
bronze medal	Telma Monteiro	Portugal

Competition at external databases
- Links: IJF • JudoInside

The women's 57 kg judo event at the 2019 European Games in Minsk was held on 22 June at the Čyžoŭka-Arena.

== Results ==
=== Final ===
Final
Nora Gjakova (KOS)	00
Daria Mezhetskaia (RUS)	01

=== Repechage ===
Repechage
Pauline Starke (GER)	10
Anna Borowska (POL)	01

Third place
Pauline Starke (GER)	10
Sappho Coban (GER)	00

Repechage
Sanne Verhagen (NED)	10
Jaione Equísoain (ESP)	00

Third place
Sanne Verhagen (NED)	00
Telma Monteiro (POR)	01

=== Top half ===
Round of 32
Ulyana Minenkova (BLR)	01
Priscilla Gneto (FRA)	11
Anastasia Konkina (RUS)	00
Pauline Starke (GER)	11
Marica Perišić (SRB)	01
Mina Libeer (BEL)	11
Martina Lo Giudice (ITA)	00
Sabrina Filzmoser (AUT)	10
Telma Monteiro (POR)	10
Margriet Bergstra (NED)	01
Corina Ștefan (ROU)	10
Viktória Majorošová (SVK)	00

Round of 16
Nora Gjakova (KOS)	01
Priscilla Gneto (FRA)	00
Pauline Starke (GER)	10
Mina Libeer (BEL)	00
Anna Borowska (POL)	01
Sabrina Filzmoser (AUT)	00
Telma Monteiro (POR)	01
Corina Ștefan (ROU)	00

Quarterfinals
Nora Gjakova (KOS)	10
Pauline Starke (GER)	00
Anna Borowska (POL)	00
Telma Monteiro (POR)	01

Semifinals
Nora Gjakova (KOS)	10
Telma Monteiro (POR)	00

=== Bottom half ===
Round of 32
Sanne Verhagen (NED)	11
Mariia Skora (UKR)	00
Daria Mezhetskaia (RUS)	10
Julia Kowalczyk (POL)	00
Mönkhtsedeviin Ichinkhorloo (AZE)	00
Eteri Liparteliani (GEO)	01
Sappho Coban (GER)	01
Ivelina Ilieva (BUL)	00
Kaja Kajzer (SLO)	00
Jaione Equísoain (ESP)	11
Jovana Rogić (SRB)	10
Loredana Ohâi (ROU)	00

Round of 16
Timna Nelson-Levy (ISR)	00
Sanne Verhagen (NED)	01
Daria Mezhetskaia (RUS)	10
Eteri Liparteliani (GEO)	00
Hedvig Karakas (HUN)	00
Sappho Coban (GER)	01
Jaione Equísoain (ESP)	10
Jovana Rogić (SRB)	00

Quarterfinals
Sanne Verhagen (NED)	00
Daria Mezhetskaia (RUS)	10
Sappho Coban (GER)	01
Jaione Equísoain (ESP)	00

Semifinals
Daria Mezhetskaia (RUS)	10
Sappho Coban (GER)	00
