= 2018 Judo Grand Prix Tbilisi =

Judo competition

Judo 2018 Judo Grand Prix Tbilisi
- Venue: Tbilisi Sports Palace
- Location: Tbilisi, Georgia
- Dates: 30 March – 1 April 2018
- Competitors: 302 from 38 nations

Competition at external databases
- Links: IJF • EJU • JudoInside

The 2018 Judo Grand Prix Tbilisi was held at the Tbilisi Sports Palace in Tbilisi, Georgia, from 30 March to 1 April 2018.

== Medal summary ==
=== Men's events ===
Event	Gold	Silver	Bronze
Extra-lightweight (−60 kg)	Lukhumi Chkhvimiani (GEO)	Amiran Papinashvili (GEO)	Lasha Chaduneli (GEO)
Extra-lightweight (−60 kg)	Lukhumi Chkhvimiani (GEO)	Amiran Papinashvili (GEO)	Temur Nozadze (GEO)
Half-lightweight (−66 kg)	Vazha Margvelashvili (GEO)	Daniel Cargnin (BRA)	Daniel Jean (FRA)
Half-lightweight (−66 kg)	Vazha Margvelashvili (GEO)	Daniel Cargnin (BRA)	Shakhram Akhadov (UZB)
Lightweight (−73 kg)	Lasha Shavdatuashvili (GEO)	Phridon Gigani (GEO)	Nils Stump (SUI)
Lightweight (−73 kg)	Lasha Shavdatuashvili (GEO)	Phridon Gigani (GEO)	Sam van 't Westende (NED)
Half-middleweight (−81 kg)	Tamazi Kirakozashvili (GEO)	Anri Egutidze (POR)	Nugzar Tatalashvili (GEO)
Half-middleweight (−81 kg)	Tamazi Kirakozashvili (GEO)	Anri Egutidze (POR)	Sergii Krivchach (UKR)
Middleweight (−90 kg)	Rafael Macedo (BRA)	Giorgi Papunashvili (GEO)	Piotr Kuczera (POL)
Middleweight (−90 kg)	Rafael Macedo (BRA)	Giorgi Papunashvili (GEO)	Li Kochman (ISR)
Half-heavyweight (−100 kg)	Peter Paltchik (ISR)	Merab Margiev (RUS)	Jorge Fonseca (POR)
Half-heavyweight (−100 kg)	Peter Paltchik (ISR)	Merab Margiev (RUS)	Onise Saneblidze (GEO)
Heavyweight (+100 kg)	Guram Tushishvili (GEO)	Javad Mahjoub (IRI)	Jur Spijkers (NED)
Heavyweight (+100 kg)	Guram Tushishvili (GEO)	Javad Mahjoub (IRI)	Levani Matiashvili (GEO)

=== Women's events ===
Event	Gold	Silver	Bronze
Extra-lightweight (−48 kg)	Maruša Štangar (SLO)	Milica Nikolić (SRB)	Mélanie Clément (FRA)
Extra-lightweight (−48 kg)	Maruša Štangar (SLO)	Milica Nikolić (SRB)	Sarah Menezes (BRA)
Half-lightweight (−52 kg)	Amandine Buchard (FRA)	Evelyne Tschopp (SUI)	Gülbadam Babamuratowa (TKM)
Half-lightweight (−52 kg)	Amandine Buchard (FRA)	Evelyne Tschopp (SUI)	Anja Štangar (SLO)
Lightweight (−57 kg)	Theresa Stoll (GER)	Hélène Receveaux (FRA)	Timna Nelson-Levy (ISR)
Lightweight (−57 kg)	Theresa Stoll (GER)	Hélène Receveaux (FRA)	Amelie Stoll (GER)
Half-middleweight (−63 kg)	Clarisse Agbegnenou (FRA)	Karolina Tałach (POL)	Lubjana Piovesana (GBR)
Half-middleweight (−63 kg)	Clarisse Agbegnenou (FRA)	Karolina Tałach (POL)	Lucy Renshall (GBR)
Middleweight (−70 kg)	Marie-Ève Gahié (FRA)	Kelita Zupancic (CAN)	Carola Paissoni (ITA)
Middleweight (−70 kg)	Marie-Ève Gahié (FRA)	Kelita Zupancic (CAN)	Mariam Tchanturia (GEO)
Half-heavyweight (−78 kg)	Audrey Tcheuméo (FRA)	Anastasiya Turchyn (UKR)	Beata Pacut (POL)
Half-heavyweight (−78 kg)	Audrey Tcheuméo (FRA)	Anastasiya Turchyn (UKR)	Madeleine Malonga (FRA)
Heavyweight (+78 kg)	Romane Dicko (FRA)	Maryna Slutskaya (BLR)	Anne Fatoumata M'Bairo (FRA)
Heavyweight (+78 kg)	Romane Dicko (FRA)	Maryna Slutskaya (BLR)	Sandra Jablonskytė (LTU)

Source Results

=== Medal table ===
* Host nation (Georgia)

Rank	Nation	Gold	Silver	Bronze	Total
1	Georgia (GEO)*	5	3	6	14
2	France (FRA)	5	1	4	10
3	Brazil (BRA)	1	1	1	3
4	Israel (ISR)	1	0	2	3
5	Germany (GER)	1	0	1	2
5	Slovenia (SLO)	1	0	1	2
7	Poland (POL)	0	1	2	3
8	Portugal (POR)	0	1	1	2
8	Switzerland (SUI)	0	1	1	2
8	Ukraine (UKR)	0	1	1	2
11	Belarus (BLR)	0	1	0	1
11	Canada (CAN)	0	1	0	1
11	Iran (IRI)	0	1	0	1
11	Russia (RUS)	0	1	0	1
11	Serbia (SRB)	0	1	0	1
16	Great Britain (GBR)	0	0	2	2
16	Netherlands (NED)	0	0	2	2
18	Italy (ITA)	0	0	1	1
18	Lithuania (LTU)	0	0	1	1
18	Turkmenistan (TKM)	0	0	1	1
18	Uzbekistan (UZB)	0	0	1	1
Totals (21 entries)		14	14	28	56
