= 2018 Judo Grand Prix Budapest =

Judo competition

Judo 2018 Judo Grand Prix Budapest
- Venue: László Papp Budapest Sports Arena
- Location: Budapest, Hungary
- Dates: 10–12 August 2018
- Competitors: 578 from 86 nations

Competition at external databases
- Links: IJF • EJU • JudoInside

The 2018 Judo Grand Prix Budapest was held at the László Papp Budapest Sports Arena in Budapest, Hungary, from 10 to 12 August 2018.

== Medal summary ==
=== Men's events ===
Event	Gold	Silver	Bronze
Extra-lightweight (−60 kg)	Ryuju Nagayama (JPN)	Albert Oguzov (RUS)	Robert Mshvidobadze (RUS)
Extra-lightweight (−60 kg)	Ryuju Nagayama (JPN)	Albert Oguzov (RUS)	Amiran Papinashvili (GEO)
Half-lightweight (−66 kg)	Kenzo Tagawa (JPN)	Mohamed Abdelmawgoud (EGY)	Denis Vieru (MDA)
Half-lightweight (−66 kg)	Kenzo Tagawa (JPN)	Mohamed Abdelmawgoud (EGY)	Bogdan Iadov (UKR)
Lightweight (−73 kg)	Miklós Ungvári (HUN)	Masashi Ebinuma (JPN)	Arthur Margelidon (CAN)
Lightweight (−73 kg)	Miklós Ungvári (HUN)	Masashi Ebinuma (JPN)	Frigyes Szabó (HUN)
Half-middleweight (−81 kg)	Alan Khubetsov (RUS)	Kenya Kohara (JPN)	Sagi Muki (ISR)
Half-middleweight (−81 kg)	Alan Khubetsov (RUS)	Kenya Kohara (JPN)	Robin Pacek (SWE)
Middleweight (−90 kg)	Krisztián Tóth (HUN)	Ushangi Margiani (GEO)	Aleksandar Kukolj (SRB)
Middleweight (−90 kg)	Krisztián Tóth (HUN)	Ushangi Margiani (GEO)	Iván Felipe Silva Morales (CUB)
Half-heavyweight (−100 kg)	Aaron Wolf (JPN)	Karl-Richard Frey (GER)	Jevgeņijs Borodavko (LAT)
Half-heavyweight (−100 kg)	Aaron Wolf (JPN)	Karl-Richard Frey (GER)	Peter Paltchik (ISR)
Heavyweight (+100 kg)	Kokoro Kageura (JPN)	Stephan Hegyi (AUT)	Roy Meyer (NED)
Heavyweight (+100 kg)	Kokoro Kageura (JPN)	Stephan Hegyi (AUT)	Adam Okruashvili (GEO)

=== Women's events ===
Event	Gold	Silver	Bronze
Extra-lightweight (−48 kg)	Hiromi Endō (JPN)	Tamami Yamazaki (JPN)	Maruša Štangar (SLO)
Extra-lightweight (−48 kg)	Hiromi Endō (JPN)	Tamami Yamazaki (JPN)	Distria Krasniqi (KOS)
Half-lightweight (−52 kg)	Natsumi Tsunoda (JPN)	Charline Van Snick (BEL)	Chelsie Giles (GBR)
Half-lightweight (−52 kg)	Natsumi Tsunoda (JPN)	Charline Van Snick (BEL)	Ecaterina Guica (CAN)
Lightweight (−57 kg)	Rafaela Silva (BRA)	Theresa Stoll (GER)	Hedvig Karakas (HUN)
Lightweight (−57 kg)	Rafaela Silva (BRA)	Theresa Stoll (GER)	Christa Deguchi (CAN)
Half-middleweight (−63 kg)	Aimi Nouchi (JPN)	Martyna Trajdos (GER)	Andreja Leški (SLO)
Half-middleweight (−63 kg)	Aimi Nouchi (JPN)	Martyna Trajdos (GER)	Agata Ozdoba-Błach (POL)
Middleweight (−70 kg)	Saki Niizoe (JPN)	Sanne van Dijke (NED)	Sally Conway (GBR)
Middleweight (−70 kg)	Saki Niizoe (JPN)	Sanne van Dijke (NED)	Kelita Zupancic (CAN)
Half-heavyweight (−78 kg)	Mami Umeki (JPN)	Rika Takayama (JPN)	Natalie Powell (GBR)
Half-heavyweight (−78 kg)	Mami Umeki (JPN)	Rika Takayama (JPN)	Guusje Steenhuis (NED)
Heavyweight (+78 kg)	Idalys Ortiz (CUB)	Maryna Slutskaya (BLR)	Nihel Cheikh Rouhou (TUN)
Heavyweight (+78 kg)	Idalys Ortiz (CUB)	Maryna Slutskaya (BLR)	Yanan Jiang (CHN)

Source Results

=== Medal table ===
* Host nation (Hungary)

Rank	Nation	Gold	Silver	Bronze	Total
1	Japan (JPN)	9	4	0	13
2	Hungary (HUN)*	2	0	2	4
3	Russia (RUS)	1	1	1	3
4	Cuba (CUB)	1	0	1	2
5	Brazil (BRA)	1	0	0	1
6	Germany (GER)	0	3	0	3
7	Georgia (GEO)	0	1	2	3
7	Netherlands (NED)	0	1	2	3
9	Austria (AUT)	0	1	0	1
9	Belarus (BLR)	0	1	0	1
9	Belgium (BEL)	0	1	0	1
9	Egypt (EGY)	0	1	0	1
13	Canada (CAN)	0	0	4	4
14	Great Britain (GBR)	0	0	3	3
15	Israel (ISR)	0	0	2	2
15	Slovenia (SLO)	0	0	2	2
17	China (CHN)	0	0	1	1
17	Kosovo (KOS)	0	0	1	1
17	Latvia (LAT)	0	0	1	1
17	Moldova (MDA)	0	0	1	1
17	Poland (POL)	0	0	1	1
17	Serbia (SRB)	0	0	1	1
17	Sweden (SWE)	0	0	1	1
17	Tunisia (TUN)	0	0	1	1
17	Ukraine (UKR)	0	0	1	1
Totals (25 entries)		14	14	28	56
