= 2012 European Junior Judo Championships =

Judo competition

Judo 2012 European Junior Judo Championships
- Venue: Žatika Sport Centre
- Location: Poreč, Croatia
- Dates: 21–23 September 2012

Competition at external databases
- Links: EJU • JudoInside

The 2012 European Junior Judo Championships is an edition of the European Junior Judo Championships, organised by the European Judo Union. It was held at Žatika Sport Centre in Poreč, Croatia from 21 to 23 September 2012.

== Medal summary ==
=== Medal table ===
* Host nation (Croatia)

Rank	Nation	Gold	Silver	Bronze	Total
1	Russia (RUS)	5	0	4	9
2	France (FRA)	2	2	3	7
3	Germany (GER)	2	1	3	6
4	Belgium (BEL)	2	1	1	4
5	Greece (GRE)	2	0	0	2
6	Georgia (GEO)	1	4	2	7
7	Turkey (TUR)	1	1	1	3
8	Poland (POL)	1	0	1	2
9	Croatia (CRO)*	0	3	0	3
10	Netherlands (NED)	0	2	2	4
11	Ukraine (UKR)	0	1	2	3
12	Israel (ISR)	0	1	1	2
13	Slovenia (SLO)	0	0	3	3
14	Hungary (HUN)	0	0	2	2
14	Italy (ITA)	0	0	2	2
16	Armenia (ARM)	0	0	1	1
16	Austria (AUT)	0	0	1	1
16	Azerbaijan (AZE)	0	0	1	1
16	Bulgaria (BUL)	0	0	1	1
16	Montenegro (MNE)	0	0	1	1
Totals (20 entries)		16	16	32	64

=== Men's events ===
Event	Gold	Silver	Bronze
−55 kg	Adrien Quertinmont (BEL)	Leri Chelidze (GEO)	Aurelien Claux (FRA)
−55 kg	Adrien Quertinmont (BEL)	Leri Chelidze (GEO)	Garik Harutyunyan (ARM)
−60 kg	Zaur Kalashaov (RUS)	Vazha Margvelashvili (GEO)	Carmine Di Loreto (ITA)
−60 kg	Zaur Kalashaov (RUS)	Vazha Margvelashvili (GEO)	Ahmet Sahin Kaba (TUR)
−66 kg	Georgios Azoidis (GRE)	Jordy Bakkes (NED)	Junior Degen (NED)
−66 kg	Georgios Azoidis (GRE)	Jordy Bakkes (NED)	Nikola Gusic (MNE)
−73 kg	Damian Szwarnowiecki (POL)	Phridon Gigani (GEO)	Levan Gugava (GEO)
−73 kg	Damian Szwarnowiecki (POL)	Phridon Gigani (GEO)	Dmitry Zuev (RUS)
−81 kg	Alexios Ntanatsidis (GRE)	Beka Gviniashvili (GEO)	Robin Gutsche (GER)
−81 kg	Alexios Ntanatsidis (GRE)	Beka Gviniashvili (GEO)	Abdulhagg Rasullu (AZE)
−90 kg	Khusen Khalmurzaev (RUS)	Michael Korrel (NED)	Mihael Žgank (SLO)
−90 kg	Khusen Khalmurzaev (RUS)	Michael Korrel (NED)	Max de Vreeze (NED)
−100 kg	Oleg Ishimov (RUS)	Toma Nikiforov (BEL)	Nicolas Damico (ITA)
−100 kg	Oleg Ishimov (RUS)	Toma Nikiforov (BEL)	Guram Tushishvili (GEO)
+100 kg	Levani Matiashvili (GEO)	Nikita Dibrin (UKR)	Andrii Koleśnyk (UKR)
+100 kg	Levani Matiashvili (GEO)	Nikita Dibrin (UKR)	Anton Krivobokov (RUS)

=== Women's events ===
Event	Gold	Silver	Bronze
−44 kg	Irina Dolgova (RUS)	Betul Aydin (TUR)	Borislava Damyanova (BUL)
−44 kg	Irina Dolgova (RUS)	Betul Aydin (TUR)	Réka Pupp (HUN)
−48 kg	Dilara Lokmanhekim (TUR)	Noa Minsker (ISR)	Anna Dmitrieva (RUS)
−48 kg	Dilara Lokmanhekim (TUR)	Noa Minsker (ISR)	Nicole Kaiser (AUT)
−52 kg	Sappho Coban (GER)	Amelie Guihur (FRA)	Karolina Pieńkowska (POL)
−52 kg	Sappho Coban (GER)	Amelie Guihur (FRA)	Julia Rosso (FRA)
−57 kg	Treicy Etiennar (FRA)	Laury Posvite (FRA)	Katja Rigelnik (SLO)
−57 kg	Treicy Etiennar (FRA)	Laury Posvite (FRA)	Katinka Szabó (HUN)
−63 kg	Margaux Pinot (FRA)	Vivian Herrmann (GER)	Lise Luyckfasseel (BEL)
−63 kg	Margaux Pinot (FRA)	Vivian Herrmann (GER)	Rotem Shor (ISR)
−70 kg	Lola Mansour (BEL)	Barbara Matić (CRO)	Szaundra Diedrich (GER)
−70 kg	Lola Mansour (BEL)	Barbara Matić (CRO)	Dariko Gabaidze (RUS)
−78 kg	Maike Ziech (GER)	Brigita Matić-Ljuba (CRO)	Urska Gracner (SLO)
−78 kg	Maike Ziech (GER)	Brigita Matić-Ljuba (CRO)	Madeleine Malonga (FRA)
+78 kg	Aleksandra Babintseva (RUS)	Ivana Šutalo (CRO)	Yelyzaveta Kalanina (UKR)
+78 kg	Aleksandra Babintseva (RUS)	Ivana Šutalo (CRO)	Carolin Weiß (GER)

Source Results
