= 2009 World Judo Cadets Championships =

Judo competition

Judo 2009 World Judo Cadets Championships
- Location: Budapest, Hungary
- Dates: 6–9 August 2009

Competition at external databases
- Links: EJU • JudoInside

The 2009 World Judo Cadets Championships is an edition of the World Judo Cadets Championships, organised by the International Judo Federation. It was held in Budapest, Hungary from 6 to 9 August 2009.

== Medal summary ==
=== Medal table ===
* Host nation (Hungary)

Rank	Nation	Gold	Silver	Bronze	Total
1	Japan (JPN)	6	2	3	11
2	Russia (RUS)	5	0	5	10
3	South Korea (KOR)	2	3	2	7
4	Brazil (BRA)	1	2	2	5
5	Italy (ITA)	1	1	1	3
6	China (CHN)	1	0	1	2
7	Belgium (BEL)	0	2	1	3
8	Azerbaijan (AZE)	0	2	0	2
9	Georgia (GEO)	0	1	1	2
10	Hungary (HUN)*	0	1	0	1
10	Romania (ROU)	0	1	0	1
10	Uzbekistan (UZB)	0	1	0	1
13	Germany (GER)	0	0	5	5
14	Austria (AUT)	0	0	2	2
14	France (FRA)	0	0	2	2
16	Croatia (CRO)	0	0	1	1
16	Denmark (DEN)	0	0	1	1
16	Greece (GRE)	0	0	1	1
16	Kazakhstan (KAZ)	0	0	1	1
16	North Korea (PRK)	0	0	1	1
16	Turkey (TUR)	0	0	1	1
16	Ukraine (UKR)	0	0	1	1
Totals (22 entries)		16	16	32	64

=== Men's events ===
Event	Gold	Silver	Bronze
−50 kg	Sakhavat Gadzhiev (RUS)	Jun-Hee Chae (KOR)	Dmytro Atanov (UKR)
−50 kg	Sakhavat Gadzhiev (RUS)	Jun-Hee Chae (KOR)	Steffen Hoffmann (GER)
−55 kg	Seiken Fujisawa (JPN)	Jeyhun Gatayev (AZE)	Kairat Agibayev (KAZ)
−55 kg	Seiken Fujisawa (JPN)	Jeyhun Gatayev (AZE)	Roman Buzuk (RUS)
−60 kg	Naohisa Takato (JPN)	Matheus Machado (BRA)	Song-Chul Heyon (PRK)
−60 kg	Naohisa Takato (JPN)	Matheus Machado (BRA)	Beka Tugushi (GEO)
−66 kg	Arbi Khamkhoev (RUS)	Jalil Jalilov (AZE)	Phuc Hong Cai (DEN)
−66 kg	Arbi Khamkhoev (RUS)	Jalil Jalilov (AZE)	Bong-Ju Kwak (KOR)
−73 kg	Khasan Khalmurzaev (RUS)	Krisztián Tóth (HUN)	Michael Greiter (AUT)
−73 kg	Khasan Khalmurzaev (RUS)	Krisztián Tóth (HUN)	Alexios Ntanatsidis (GRE)
−81 kg	Lee Jae-hyung (KOR)	Henrique Silva (BRA)	Batuhan Efemgil (TUR)
−81 kg	Lee Jae-hyung (KOR)	Henrique Silva (BRA)	Ali Erdogan (RUS)
−90 kg	Ryosuke Igarashi (JPN)	Toma Nikiforov (BEL)	Magomedrasul Gashimov (RUS)
−90 kg	Ryosuke Igarashi (JPN)	Toma Nikiforov (BEL)	Marius Piepke (GER)
+90 kg	Anton Krivobokov (RUS)	Rostomi Khakhaleishvili (GEO)	Alexis Dion (FRA)
+90 kg	Anton Krivobokov (RUS)	Rostomi Khakhaleishvili (GEO)	Tsubasa Endo (JPN)

=== Women's events ===
Event	Gold	Silver	Bronze
−40 kg	Venera Nizamova (RUS)	Seul-Bi Bae (KOR)	Saori Adachi (JPN)
−40 kg	Venera Nizamova (RUS)	Seul-Bi Bae (KOR)	Andrea Kunitz (GER)
−44 kg	Mai Morishita (JPN)	Alexandra Pop (ROU)	Angelina Bombara (ITA)
−44 kg	Mai Morishita (JPN)	Alexandra Pop (ROU)	Evgenia Demintseva (RUS)
−48 kg	Hiromi Endō (JPN)	Odette Giuffrida (ITA)	Anna Dmitrieva (RUS)
−48 kg	Hiromi Endō (JPN)	Odette Giuffrida (ITA)	Julia Rosso (FRA)
−52 kg	Li Ning (CHN)	Lee Eun-ju (KOR)	Christine Huck (AUT)
−52 kg	Li Ning (CHN)	Lee Eun-ju (KOR)	Takumi Miyakawa (JPN)
−57 kg	Flávia Gomes (BRA)	Yuri Okamoto (JPN)	Eun-sol Choi (KOR)
−57 kg	Flávia Gomes (BRA)	Yuri Okamoto (JPN)	Yalin Wang (CHN)
−63 kg	Miku Tashiro (JPN)	Gulnoza Matniyazova (UZB)	Barbara Matić (CRO)
−63 kg	Miku Tashiro (JPN)	Gulnoza Matniyazova (UZB)	Lise Luyckfasseel (BEL)
−70 kg	Valeria Ferrari (ITA)	Lola Mansour (BEL)	Natalia Kubin (GER)
−70 kg	Valeria Ferrari (ITA)	Lola Mansour (BEL)	Tainã Nery (BRA)
+70 kg	Ji-Yeon Yu (KOR)	Emi Fujiwara (JPN)	Samanta Soares (BRA)
+70 kg	Ji-Yeon Yu (KOR)	Emi Fujiwara (JPN)	Carolin Weiß (GER)

Source Results
