= Anzaur Ardanov =

Russian judoka (born 1991)

Personal information
- Born: 4 July 1991 (age 34)
- Occupation: Judoka

Sport
- Country: Russia
- Sport: Judo
- Weight class: ‍–‍66 kg

Achievements and titles
- European Champ.: R16 (2016)
Medal record
Men's judo
Representing Russia
IJF Grand Slam
| Silver medal – second place | 2016 Tyumen | ‍–‍66 kg |
| Silver medal – second place | 2017 Paris | ‍–‍66 kg |
| Bronze medal – third place | 2014 Tyumen | ‍–‍66 kg |
IJF Grand Prix
| Silver medal – second place | 2016 Qingdao | ‍–‍66 kg |
| Bronze medal – third place | 2014 Jeju | ‍–‍66 kg |
European Junior Championships
| Silver medal – second place | 2010 Samokov | ‍–‍66 kg |
Summer Universiade
| Bronze medal – third place | 2015 Gwangju | ‍–‍66 kg |

Profile at external databases
- IJF: 3806
- JudoInside.com: 90306
- Updated on 24 November 2022

Anzaur Ardanov (born 4 July 1991) is a Russian judoka.

Ardanov is the silver medalist of the 2017 Judo Grand Slam Paris in the ‍–‍66 kg category.
