= Mao Izumi =

Japanese judoka (born 1996)

Personal information
- Born: 1 November 1996 (age 29)
- Occupation: Judoka

Sport
- Country: Japan
- Sport: Judo
- Weight class: ‍–‍78 kg

Achievements and titles
- Asian Champ.: (gold) (2019)
Medal record
Women's judo
Representing Japan
Asian Championships
Gold medal – first place	2019 Fujairah	‍–‍78 kg
IJF Grand Slam
Gold medal – first place	2019 Ekaterinburg	‍–‍78 kg
Gold medal – first place	2023 Astana	‍–‍78 kg
Silver medal – second place	2025 Astana	‍–‍78 kg
Silver medal – second place	2026 Budapest	‍–‍78 kg
Bronze medal – third place	2019 Osaka	‍–‍78 kg
Bronze medal – third place	2025 Tokyo	‍–‍78 kg
IJF Grand Prix
Gold medal – first place	2018 Tunis	‍–‍78 kg

Profile at external databases
- IJF: 25864
- JudoInside.com: 94232
- Updated on 13 September 2026

Mao Izumi (born 1 November 1996) is a Japanese judoka.

Izumi is the gold medallist of the 2019 Judo Grand Slam Ekaterinburg in the ‍–‍78 kg category.
