= 2014 Judo Grand Slam Tyumen =

Judo competition

Judo 2014 Judo Grand Slam Tyumen
- Location: Tyumen, Russia
- Dates: 12–13 July 2014
- Competitors: 264 from 38 nations

Competition at external databases
- Links: IJF • EJU • JudoInside

The 2014 Judo Grand Slam Tyumen was held in Tyumen, Russia, from 12 to 13 July 2014.

== Medal summary ==
=== Men's events ===
Event	Gold	Silver	Bronze
Extra-lightweight (−60 kg)	Shinji Kido (JPN)	Felipe Kitadai (BRA)	Ilgar Mushkiyev (AZE)
Extra-lightweight (−60 kg)	Shinji Kido (JPN)	Felipe Kitadai (BRA)	Yuma Oshima (JPN)
Half-lightweight (−66 kg)	Charles Chibana (BRA)	Yuhei Rokugo (JPN)	Anzaur Ardanov (RUS)
Half-lightweight (−66 kg)	Charles Chibana (BRA)	Yuhei Rokugo (JPN)	Masaaki Fukuoka (JPN)
Lightweight (−73 kg)	Denis Iartsev (RUS)	Marcelo Contini (BRA)	Uali Kurzhev (RUS)
Lightweight (−73 kg)	Denis Iartsev (RUS)	Marcelo Contini (BRA)	Alex Pombo (BRA)
Half-middleweight (−81 kg)	Victor Penalber (BRA)	Alan Khubetsov (RUS)	Stanislav Semenov (RUS)
Half-middleweight (−81 kg)	Victor Penalber (BRA)	Alan Khubetsov (RUS)	Antoine Valois-Fortier (CAN)
Middleweight (−90 kg)	Yuya Yoshida (JPN)	Dilshod Choriev (UZB)	Magomed Magomedov (RUS)
Middleweight (−90 kg)	Yuya Yoshida (JPN)	Dilshod Choriev (UZB)	Grigorii Sulemin (RUS)
Half-heavyweight (−100 kg)	Elmar Gasimov (AZE)	Kyle Reyes (CAN)	Ryunosuke Haga (JPN)
Half-heavyweight (−100 kg)	Elmar Gasimov (AZE)	Kyle Reyes (CAN)	Martin Pacek (SWE)
Heavyweight (+100 kg)	Rafael Silva (BRA)	Takeshi Ōjitani (JPN)	Hisayoshi Harasawa (JPN)
Heavyweight (+100 kg)	Rafael Silva (BRA)	Takeshi Ōjitani (JPN)	Maciej Sarnacki (POL)

=== Women's events ===
Event	Gold	Silver	Bronze
Extra-lightweight (−48 kg)	Sarah Menezes (BRA)	Emi Yamagishi (JPN)	Taciana Cesar (GBS)
Extra-lightweight (−48 kg)	Sarah Menezes (BRA)	Emi Yamagishi (JPN)	Valentina Moscatt (ITA)
Half-lightweight (−52 kg)	Misato Nakamura (JPN)	Yulia Kazarina (RUS)	Andreea Chițu (ROU)
Half-lightweight (−52 kg)	Misato Nakamura (JPN)	Yulia Kazarina (RUS)	Érika Miranda (BRA)
Lightweight (−57 kg)	Catherine Beauchemin-Pinard (CAN)	Marti Malloy (USA)	Sabrina Filzmoser (AUT)
Lightweight (−57 kg)	Catherine Beauchemin-Pinard (CAN)	Marti Malloy (USA)	Loredana Ohai (ROU)
Half-middleweight (−63 kg)	Kana Abe (JPN)	Ekaterina Valkova (RUS)	Hilde Drexler (AUT)
Half-middleweight (−63 kg)	Kana Abe (JPN)	Ekaterina Valkova (RUS)	Pari Surakatova (RUS)
Middleweight (−70 kg)	Kim Polling (NED)	Kelita Zupancic (CAN)	Chizuru Arai (JPN)
Middleweight (−70 kg)	Kim Polling (NED)	Kelita Zupancic (CAN)	Kim Seong-yeon (KOR)
Half-heavyweight (−78 kg)	Mayra Aguiar (BRA)	Kayla Harrison (USA)	Tomomi Okamura (JPN)
Half-heavyweight (−78 kg)	Mayra Aguiar (BRA)	Kayla Harrison (USA)	Daria Pogorzelec (POL)
Heavyweight (+78 kg)	Kanae Yamabe (JPN)	Lee Jung-eun (KOR)	Maria Suelen Altheman (BRA)
Heavyweight (+78 kg)	Kanae Yamabe (JPN)	Lee Jung-eun (KOR)	Qin Qian (CHN)

Source Results

=== Medal table ===
* Host nation (Russia)

Rank	Nation	Gold	Silver	Bronze	Total
1	Japan (JPN)	5	3	6	14
2	Brazil (BRA)	5	2	3	10
3	Russia (RUS)*	1	3	6	10
4	Canada (CAN)	1	2	1	4
5	Azerbaijan (AZE)	1	0	1	2
6	Netherlands (NED)	1	0	0	1
7	United States (USA)	0	2	0	2
8	South Korea (KOR)	0	1	1	2
9	Uzbekistan (UZB)	0	1	0	1
10	Austria (AUT)	0	0	2	2
10	Poland (POL)	0	0	2	2
10	Romania (ROU)	0	0	2	2
13	China (CHN)	0	0	1	1
13	Guinea-Bissau (GBS)	0	0	1	1
13	Italy (ITA)	0	0	1	1
13	Sweden (SWE)	0	0	1	1
Totals (16 entries)		14	14	28	56
