= 2019 Judo Grand Prix Hohhot =

Judo competition

Judo 2019 Judo Grand Prix Hohhot
- Venue: Inner Mongolia Stadium
- Location: Hohhot, China
- Dates: 24–26 May 2019
- Competitors: 301 from 43 nations

Competition at external databases
- Links: IJF • EJU • JudoInside

The 2019 Judo Grand Prix Hohhot was held in Hohhot, China, from 24 to 26 May 2019.

== Medal summary ==
=== Men's events ===
Event	Gold	Silver	Bronze
Extra-lightweight (−60 kg)	Kim Won-jin (KOR)	Yang Yung-wei (TPE)	Choi In-hyuk (KOR)
Extra-lightweight (−60 kg)	Kim Won-jin (KOR)	Yang Yung-wei (TPE)	Albert Oguzov (RUS)
Half-lightweight (−66 kg)	Kim Lim-hwan (KOR)	Aram Grigoryan (RUS)	Tsai Ming-yen (TPE)
Half-lightweight (−66 kg)	Kim Lim-hwan (KOR)	Aram Grigoryan (RUS)	Yondonperenlein Baskhüü (MGL)
Lightweight (−73 kg)	Hidayat Heydarov (AZE)	Victor Scvortov (UAE)	Arthur Margelidon (CAN)
Lightweight (−73 kg)	Hidayat Heydarov (AZE)	Victor Scvortov (UAE)	Igor Wandtke (GER)
Half-middleweight (−81 kg)	Saeid Mollaei (IRI)	Sotaro Fujiwara (JPN)	Dominic Ressel (GER)
Half-middleweight (−81 kg)	Saeid Mollaei (IRI)	Sotaro Fujiwara (JPN)	Lee Sung-ho (KOR)
Middleweight (−90 kg)	Kenta Nagasawa (JPN)	Nemanja Majdov (SRB)	Giorgi Papunashvili (GEO)
Middleweight (−90 kg)	Kenta Nagasawa (JPN)	Nemanja Majdov (SRB)	Iván Felipe Silva Morales (CUB)
Half-heavyweight (−100 kg)	Cho Gu-ham (KOR)	Benjamin Fletcher (IRL)	Karl-Richard Frey (GER)
Half-heavyweight (−100 kg)	Cho Gu-ham (KOR)	Benjamin Fletcher (IRL)	Lkhagvasürengiin Otgonbaatar (MGL)
Heavyweight (+100 kg)	Kim Min-jong (KOR)	Naidangiin Tüvshinbayar (MGL)	Levani Matiashvili (GEO)
Heavyweight (+100 kg)	Kim Min-jong (KOR)	Naidangiin Tüvshinbayar (MGL)	Lukáš Krpálek (CZE)

=== Women's events ===
Event	Gold	Silver	Bronze
Extra-lightweight (−48 kg)	Jon Yu-sun (PRK)	Xiong Yao (CHN)	Katharina Menz (GER)
Extra-lightweight (−48 kg)	Jon Yu-sun (PRK)	Xiong Yao (CHN)	Shira Rishony (ISR)
Half-lightweight (−52 kg)	Uta Abe (JPN)	Evelyne Tschopp (SUI)	Ecaterina Guica (CAN)
Half-lightweight (−52 kg)	Uta Abe (JPN)	Evelyne Tschopp (SUI)	Gefen Primo (ISR)
Lightweight (−57 kg)	Kim Jin-a (PRK)	Daria Kurbonmamadova (RUS)	Jessica Klimkait (CAN)
Lightweight (−57 kg)	Kim Jin-a (PRK)	Daria Kurbonmamadova (RUS)	Lu Tongjuan (CHN)
Half-middleweight (−63 kg)	Martyna Trajdos (GER)	Tang Jing (CHN)	Aimi Nouchi (JPN)
Half-middleweight (−63 kg)	Martyna Trajdos (GER)	Tang Jing (CHN)	Yang Junxia (CHN)
Middleweight (−70 kg)	Saki Niizoe (JPN)	Anna Bernholm (SWE)	Kelita Zupancic (CAN)
Middleweight (−70 kg)	Saki Niizoe (JPN)	Anna Bernholm (SWE)	Giovanna Scoccimarro (GER)
Half-heavyweight (−78 kg)	Fanny Estelle Posvite (FRA)	Anna-Maria Wagner (GER)	Kaliema Antomarchi (CUB)
Half-heavyweight (−78 kg)	Fanny Estelle Posvite (FRA)	Anna-Maria Wagner (GER)	Ma Zhenzhao (CHN)
Heavyweight (+78 kg)	Idalys Ortiz (CUB)	Maya Akiba (JPN)	Jasmin Grabowski (GER)
Heavyweight (+78 kg)	Idalys Ortiz (CUB)	Maya Akiba (JPN)	Xu Shiyan (CHN)

=== Medal table ===
* Host nation (China)

Rank	Nation	Gold	Silver	Bronze	Total
1	South Korea (KOR)	4	0	2	6
2	Japan (JPN)	3	2	1	6
3	North Korea (PRK)	2	0	0	2
4	Germany (GER)	1	1	6	8
5	Cuba (CUB)	1	0	2	3
6	Azerbaijan (AZE)	1	0	0	1
6	France (FRA)	1	0	0	1
6	Iran (IRI)	1	0	0	1
9	China (CHN)*	0	2	4	6
10	Russia (RUS)	0	2	1	3
11	Mongolia (MGL)	0	1	2	3
12	Chinese Taipei (TPE)	0	1	1	2
13	Ireland (IRL)	0	1	0	1
13	Serbia (SRB)	0	1	0	1
13	Sweden (SWE)	0	1	0	1
13	Switzerland (SUI)	0	1	0	1
13	United Arab Emirates (UAE)	0	1	0	1
18	Canada (CAN)	0	0	4	4
19	Georgia (GEO)	0	0	2	2
19	Israel (ISR)	0	0	2	2
21	Czech Republic (CZE)	0	0	1	1
Totals (21 entries)		14	14	28	56
