= Sappho Çoban =

German judoka (born 1994)

Personal information
- Full name: Sappho Özge Çoban
- Born: 7 September 1994 (age 31) Karlsruhe, Germany
- Occupation: Judoka
- Website: www.sappho-coban.de

Sport
- Country: Germany
- Sport: Judo
- Weight class: ‍–‍57 kg, ‍–‍63 kg

Achievements and titles
- European Champ.: 5th (2019)
Medal record
Women's judo
Representing Germany
European Championships
Bronze medal – third place	2013 Budapest	Women's team
Bronze medal – third place	2017 Warsaw	Women's team
European U23 Championships
Gold medal – first place	2014 Wrocław	‍–‍52 kg
Gold medal – first place	2015 Bratislava	‍–‍57 kg
World Juniors Championships
Gold medal – first place	2013 Ljubljana	‍–‍52 kg
Bronze medal – third place	2013 Ljubljana	Women's team
European Junior Championships
Gold medal – first place	2012 Poreč	‍–‍52 kg

Profile at external databases
- IJF: 9226
- JudoInside.com: 65576
- Updated on 15 January 2023

Sappho Özge Çoban (born 7 September 1994) is a German retired judoka of Turkish descent who competed at international judo competitions. She is a World Junior champion and a three-time European U23 champion, she also competed at the 2019 European Games. Her sister Xenia Çoban is also a judoka, they both lived and trained together in Stuttgart, Sappho works as a police chief in the German city.

Çoban became the first female athlete to be awarded Germany's Junior Athlete of the Year award in 2014 following her 2013 World title.
