= 2016 Judo Grand Slam Tyumen =

Judo competition

Judo 2016 Judo Grand Slam Tyumen
- Venue: Athletic Center, Tyumen
- Location: Tyumen, Russia
- Dates: 16–17 July 2016
- Competitors: 124 from 25 nations

Competition at external databases
- Links: IJF • EJU • JudoInside

The 2016 Judo Grand Slam was held in Tyumen, Russia, from 16 to 17 July 2016.

== Medal summary ==
=== Men's events ===
Event	Gold	Silver	Bronze
Extra-lightweight (−60 kg)	Yuma Oshima (JPN)	Albert Oguzov (RUS)	Ilgar Mushkiyev (AZE)
Extra-lightweight (−60 kg)	Yuma Oshima (JPN)	Albert Oguzov (RUS)	Davud Mammadsoy (AZE)
Half-lightweight (−66 kg)	Hifumi Abe (JPN)	Anzaur Ardanov (RUS)	Sho Tateyama (JPN)
Half-lightweight (−66 kg)	Hifumi Abe (JPN)	Anzaur Ardanov (RUS)	Yakub Shamilov (RUS)
Lightweight (−73 kg)	Musa Mogushkov (RUS)	Arbi Khamkhoev (RUS)	Tommy Macias (SWE)
Lightweight (−73 kg)	Musa Mogushkov (RUS)	Arbi Khamkhoev (RUS)	Alim Gadanov (RUS)
Half-middleweight (−81 kg)	Aslan Lappinagov (RUS)	Seidai Sato (JPN)	Stanislav Semenov (RUS)
Half-middleweight (−81 kg)	Aslan Lappinagov (RUS)	Seidai Sato (JPN)	Alan Khubetsov (RUS)
Middleweight (−90 kg)	Marcus Nyman (SWE)	Khusen Khalmurzaev (RUS)	Kenta Nagasawa (JPN)
Middleweight (−90 kg)	Marcus Nyman (SWE)	Khusen Khalmurzaev (RUS)	Magomed Magomedov (RUS)
Half-heavyweight (−100 kg)	Martin Pacek (SWE)	Adlan Bisultanov (RUS)	Niyaz Bilalov (RUS)
Half-heavyweight (−100 kg)	Martin Pacek (SWE)	Adlan Bisultanov (RUS)	Kazbek Zankishiev (RUS)
Heavyweight (+100 kg)	Andrey Volkov (RUS)	Yusei Ogawa (RUS)	Takeshi Ōjitani (JPN)
Heavyweight (+100 kg)	Andrey Volkov (RUS)	Yusei Ogawa (RUS)	Anton Brachev (RUS)

=== Women's events ===
Event	Gold	Silver	Bronze
Extra-lightweight (−48 kg)	Funa Tonaki (JPN)	Nataliya Kondratyeva (RUS)	Milica Nikolić (SRB)
Extra-lightweight (−48 kg)	Funa Tonaki (JPN)	Nataliya Kondratyeva (RUS)	Sabina Giliazova (RUS)
Half-lightweight (−52 kg)	Ai Shishime (JPN)	Yulia Kazarina (RUS)	Aigul Kutsenko (RUS)
Half-lightweight (−52 kg)	Ai Shishime (JPN)	Yulia Kazarina (RUS)	Tena Šikić (CRO)
Lightweight (−57 kg)	Tsukasa Yoshida (JPN)	Daria Kurbonmamadova (RUS)	Jovana Rogić (SRB)
Lightweight (−57 kg)	Tsukasa Yoshida (JPN)	Daria Kurbonmamadova (RUS)	Natalia Golomidova (RUS)
Half-middleweight (−63 kg)	Aimi Nouchi (JPN)	Daria Davydova (RUS)	Mia Hermansson (SWE)
Half-middleweight (−63 kg)	Aimi Nouchi (JPN)	Daria Davydova (RUS)	Diana Dzhigaros (RUS)
Middleweight (−70 kg)	Chizuru Arai (JPN)	Valentina Maltseva (RUS)	Elvismar Rodríguez (VEN)
Middleweight (−70 kg)	Chizuru Arai (JPN)	Valentina Maltseva (RUS)	Aleksandra Samardžić (BIH)
Half-heavyweight (−78 kg)	Rika Takayama (JPN)	Klara Apotekar (SLO)	Anastasiya Dmitrieva (RUS)
Half-heavyweight (−78 kg)	Rika Takayama (JPN)	Klara Apotekar (SLO)	Aleksandra Babintseva (RUS)
Heavyweight (+78 kg)	Nami Inamori (JPN)	Nihel Cheikh Rouhou (TUN)	Larisa Cerić (BIH)
Heavyweight (+78 kg)	Nami Inamori (JPN)	Nihel Cheikh Rouhou (TUN)	Natalia Sokolova (RUS)

Source Results

=== Medal table ===
* Host nation (Russia)

Rank	Nation	Gold	Silver	Bronze	Total
1	Japan (JPN)	9	1	3	13
2	Russia (RUS)*	3	11	15	29
3	Sweden (SWE)	2	0	2	4
4	Slovenia (SLO)	0	1	0	1
4	Tunisia (TUN)	0	1	0	1
6	Azerbaijan (AZE)	0	0	2	2
6	Bosnia and Herzegovina (BIH)	0	0	2	2
6	Serbia (SRB)	0	0	2	2
9	Croatia (CRO)	0	0	1	1
9	Venezuela (VEN)	0	0	1	1
Totals (10 entries)		14	14	28	56
