= Giorgi Papunashvili (judoka) =

Georgian judoka (born 1991)

Personal information
- Nationality: Georgian
- Born: 3 August 1991 (age 34)
- Occupation: Judoka

Sport
- Country: Georgia
- Sport: Judo
- Weight class: –81 kg, –90 kg
Medal record
Men's judo
Representing Georgia
IJF Grand Prix
| Silver medal – second place | 2018 Tbilisi | –90 kg |
| Silver medal – second place | 2019 Tbilisi | –90 kg |
| Silver medal – second place | 2019 Antalya | –90 kg |
| Bronze medal – third place | 2019 Hohhot | –90 kg |

Profile at external databases
- IJF: 18009
- JudoInside.com: 87205
- Updated on 29 November 2022

Giorgi Papunashvili (born 3 August 1991) is a Georgian judoka.

He is the silver medallist of the 2018 Judo Grand Prix Tbilisi in the -90 kg category.
