= Aram Grigoryan (judoka) =

Russian judoka (born 1992)

Personal information
- Native name: Арам Камоевич Григорян
- Full name: Aram Kamoyevich Grigoryan
- Born: 3 September 1992 (age 33)
- Occupation: Judoka

Sport
- Country: Russia
- Sport: Judo
- Weight class: ‍–‍66 kg

Achievements and titles
- European Champ.: R16 (2021)
Medal record
Men's judo
Representing Russia
World Masters
Bronze medal – third place	2021 Doha	‍–‍66 kg
IJF Grand Slam
Bronze medal – third place	2018 Osaka	‍–‍66 kg
Bronze medal – third place	2021 Tashkent	‍–‍66 kg
IJF Grand Prix
Gold medal – first place	2018 Cancún	‍–‍66 kg
Silver medal – second place	2019 Hohhot	‍–‍66 kg
Bronze medal – third place	2013 Düsseldorf	‍–‍60 kg
Bronze medal – third place	2018 Tunis	‍–‍66 kg
Bronze medal – third place	2021 Zagreb	‍–‍66 kg
European U23 Championships
Gold medal – first place	2012 Prague	‍–‍60 kg
Gold medal – first place	2013 Samokov	‍–‍60 kg
European Junior Championships
Bronze medal – third place	2010 Samokov	‍–‍55 kg
Bronze medal – third place	2011 Lommel	‍–‍60 kg
European Cadet Championships
Gold medal – first place	2008 Sarajevo	‍–‍50 kg

Profile at external databases
- IJF: 3801
- JudoInside.com: 97444
- Updated on 20 November 2022

Aram Kamoyevich Grigoryan (Russian: Арам Камоевич Григорян; born 3 September 1992) is a Russian judoka. He is the gold medalist in the ‍–‍60 kg at the 2014 Qingdao Grand Prix
