= 2014 European U23 Judo Championships =

Judo competition

Judo 2014 European U23 Judo Championships
- Location: Wrocław, Poland
- Dates: 14–16 November 2014

Competition at external databases
- Links: JudoInside

The 2014 European U23 Judo Championships is an edition of the European U23 Judo Championships, organised by the European Judo Union. It was held in Wrocław, Poland from 14 to 16 November 2014.

== Medal summary ==
=== Medal table ===
* Host nation (Poland)

Rank	Nation	Gold	Silver	Bronze	Total
1	Russia (RUS)	4	4	4	12
2	Germany (GER)	2	1	2	5
3	Netherlands (NED)	2	1	1	4
4	Italy (ITA)	2	0	6	8
5	Israel (ISR)	1	0	2	3
6	Greece (GRE)	1	0	1	2
7	Kosovo (KOS)	1	0	0	1
7	Sweden (SWE)	1	0	0	1
9	Slovenia (SLO)	0	2	1	3
10	Azerbaijan (AZE)	0	1	2	3
11	Belgium (BEL)	0	1	1	2
12	Belarus (BLR)	0	1	0	1
12	Croatia (CRO)	0	1	0	1
12	Montenegro (MNE)	0	1	0	1
12	Poland (POL)*	0	1	0	1
16	Bosnia and Herzegovina (BIH)	0	0	2	2
16	Spain (ESP)	0	0	2	2
18	Portugal (POR)	0	0	1	1
18	Romania (ROU)	0	0	1	1
18	Serbia (SRB)	0	0	1	1
18	Ukraine (UKR)	0	0	1	1
Totals (21 entries)		14	14	28	56

=== Men's events ===
Event	Gold	Silver	Bronze
Extra-lightweight (−60 kg)	Islam Yashuev (RUS)	Łukasz Kiełbasiński (POL)	Lechi Ediev (RUS)
Extra-lightweight (−60 kg)	Islam Yashuev (RUS)	Łukasz Kiełbasiński (POL)	Mehman Sadigov (AZE)
Half-lightweight (−66 kg)	Baruch Shmailov (ISR)	Andraz Jereb (SLO)	Marko Vukićević (SRB)
Half-lightweight (−66 kg)	Baruch Shmailov (ISR)	Andraz Jereb (SLO)	Adrian Labrado (ESP)
Lightweight (−73 kg)	Antonio Esposito (ITA)	Nikola Gusic (MNE)	Augusto Meloni (ITA)
Lightweight (−73 kg)	Antonio Esposito (ITA)	Nikola Gusic (MNE)	Huseyn Rahimli (AZE)
Half-middleweight (−81 kg)	Vedat Albayrak (GRE)	Aslan Lappinagov (RUS)	Dominic Ressel (GER)
Half-middleweight (−81 kg)	Vedat Albayrak (GRE)	Aslan Lappinagov (RUS)	Khasan Khalmurzaev (RUS)
Middleweight (−90 kg)	Kazbek Zankishiev (RUS)	Michael Korrel (NED)	Li Kochman (ISR)
Middleweight (−90 kg)	Kazbek Zankishiev (RUS)	Michael Korrel (NED)	Mihael Žgank (SLO)
Half-heavyweight (−100 kg)	Domenico Di Guida (ITA)	Zlatko Kumrić (CRO)	Yacov Mamistvalov (ISR)
Half-heavyweight (−100 kg)	Domenico Di Guida (ITA)	Zlatko Kumrić (CRO)	Jorge Fonseca (POR)
Heavyweight (+100 kg)	Anton Krivobokov (RUS)	Ushangi Kokauri (AZE)	Daniel Natea (ROU)
Heavyweight (+100 kg)	Anton Krivobokov (RUS)	Ushangi Kokauri (AZE)	Harun Sadikovic (BIH)

=== Women's events ===
Event	Gold	Silver	Bronze
Extra-lightweight (−48 kg)	Anna Dmitrieva (RUS)	Irina Dolgova (RUS)	Anne-Sophie Jura (BEL)
Extra-lightweight (−48 kg)	Anna Dmitrieva (RUS)	Irina Dolgova (RUS)	Cinta Garcia Mesa (ESP)
Half-lightweight (−52 kg)	Sappho Coban (GER)	Maria Ertl (GER)	Anastasia Polikarpova (RUS)
Half-lightweight (−52 kg)	Sappho Coban (GER)	Maria Ertl (GER)	Odette Giuffrida (ITA)
Lightweight (−57 kg)	Nora Gjakova (KOS)	Anastasia Konkina (RUS)	Anna Righetti (ITA)
Lightweight (−57 kg)	Nora Gjakova (KOS)	Anastasia Konkina (RUS)	Maria Centracchio (ITA)
Half-middleweight (−63 kg)	Emma Barkeling (SWE)	Daniela Kazanoi (BLR)	Nadja Bazynski (GER)
Half-middleweight (−63 kg)	Emma Barkeling (SWE)	Daniela Kazanoi (BLR)	Elisavet Teltsidou (GRE)
Middleweight (−70 kg)	Sanne van Dijke (NED)	Lola Mansour (BEL)	Aleksandra Samardzic (BIH)
Middleweight (−70 kg)	Sanne van Dijke (NED)	Lola Mansour (BEL)	Valeria Ferrari (ITA)
Half-heavyweight (−78 kg)	Maike Ziech (GER)	Klara Apotekar (SLO)	Karen Stevenson (NED)
Half-heavyweight (−78 kg)	Maike Ziech (GER)	Klara Apotekar (SLO)	Anastasiya Turchyn (UKR)
Heavyweight (+78 kg)	Tessie Savelkouls (NED)	Aleksandra Babintseva (RUS)	Aydana Nagorova (RUS)
Heavyweight (+78 kg)	Tessie Savelkouls (NED)	Aleksandra Babintseva (RUS)	Elisa Marchio (ITA)

Source Results
