= Judo at the 2018 Mediterranean Games – Men's 81 kg =

Judo competition

Men's 81 kg at the 2018 Mediterranean Games
- Venue: Cambrils Pavilion
- Date: 28 June
- Competitors: 13 from 13 nations

Medalists
gold medal	Abdelaziz Ben Ammar	Tunisia
silver medal	Mohamed Abdelaal	Egypt
bronze medal	Anri Egutidze	Portugal
bronze medal	Alexios Ntanatsidis	Greece

The men's 81 kg competition in judo at the 2018 Mediterranean Games was held on 28 June at the Cambrils Pavilion in Cambrils.

== Schedule ==
All times are Central European Summer Time (UTC+2).

Date	Time	Round
June 28, 2018	10:56	Round of 16
June 28, 2018	12:16	Quarterfinals
June 28, 2018	13:04	Semifinals
June 28, 2018	14:16	Repechage
June 28, 2018	17:32	Bronze medal
June 28, 2018	17:40	Final

== Results ==
=== Main Round ===
Round of 16
Alexios Ntanatsidis (GRE)	10
Aristos Michael (CYP)	00
Achraf Moutii (MAR)	11
Artan Rushiti (MKD)	00
Alpha Oumar Djalo (FRA)	01
Alfonso Urquiza (ESP)	11
Antonio Esposito (ITA)	00
Mohamad Kasem (SYR)	10
Abdelaziz Ben Ammar (TUN)	10
Steven Azar (LBN)	00

Quarterfinals
Anri Egutidze (POR)	00
Alexios Ntanatsidis (GRE)	10
Achraf Moutii (MAR)	00
Mohamed Abdelaal (EGY)	11
Vedat Albayrak (TUR)	00
Alfonso Urquiza (ESP)	01
Mohamad Kasem (SYR)	00
Abdelaziz Ben Ammar (TUN)	10

Semifinals
Alexios Ntanatsidis (GRE)	00
Mohamed Abdelaal (EGY)	10
Alfonso Urquiza (ESP)	00
Abdelaziz Ben Ammar (TUN)	10

Final
Mohamed Abdelaal (EGY)	00
Abdelaziz Ben Ammar (TUN)	11

=== Repechage ===
Repechage 1		Repechage 2		Bronze medal
Aristos Michael (CYP)	00
Anri Egutidze (POR)	10	Anri Egutidze (POR)	10
		Achraf Moutii (MAR)	01
				Anri Egutidze (POR)	01
				Alfonso Urquiza (ESP)	00

Repechage 1		Repechage 2		Bronze medal
Alpha Oumar Djalo (FRA)	10
Vedat Albayrak (TUR)	00	Alpha Oumar Djalo (FRA)	00
Steven Azar (LBN)	00	Mohamad Kasem (SYR)	10
Mohamad Kasem (SYR)	10			Mohamad Kasem (SYR)	00
				Alexios Ntanatsidis (GRE)	10
