= 2018 Judo Grand Prix Tunis =

Judo competition

Judo 2018 Judo Grand Prix Tunis
- Venue: El Menzah Sports Palace
- Location: Tunis, Tunisia
- Dates: 19–21 January 2018
- Competitors: 335 from 46 nations

Competition at external databases
- Links: IJF • EJU • JudoInside

The 2018 Judo Grand Prix Tunis was held at the El Menzah Sports Palace in Tunis, Tunisia, from 19 to 21 January 2018.

== Medal summary ==
=== Men's events ===
Event	Gold	Silver	Bronze
Extra-lightweight (−60 kg)	Walide Khyar (FRA)	Matjaž Trbovc (SLO)	Gusman Kyrgyzbayev (KAZ)
Extra-lightweight (−60 kg)	Walide Khyar (FRA)	Matjaž Trbovc (SLO)	Seiya Miyanohara (JPN)
Half-lightweight (−66 kg)	Shakhram Akhadov (UZB)	Taroh Fujisaka (JPN)	Aram Grigoryan (RUS)
Half-lightweight (−66 kg)	Shakhram Akhadov (UZB)	Taroh Fujisaka (JPN)	Yerlan Serikzhanov (KAZ)
Lightweight (−73 kg)	Zhansay Smagulov (KAZ)	Akil Gjakova (KOS)	Mirzohid Farmonov (UZB)
Lightweight (−73 kg)	Zhansay Smagulov (KAZ)	Akil Gjakova (KOS)	Yuhei Yoshida (JPN)
Half-middleweight (−81 kg)	Stanislav Semenov (RUS)	Vedat Albayrak (TUR)	Kenya Kohara (JPN)
Half-middleweight (−81 kg)	Stanislav Semenov (RUS)	Vedat Albayrak (TUR)	Eduardo Yudy Santos (BRA)
Middleweight (−90 kg)	Islam Bozbayev (KAZ)	Krisztián Tóth (HUN)	David Klammert (CZE)
Middleweight (−90 kg)	Islam Bozbayev (KAZ)	Krisztián Tóth (HUN)	Noël van 't End (NED)
Half-heavyweight (−100 kg)	Benjamin Fletcher (IRL)	Ramazan Malsuigenov (RUS)	Viktor Demyanenko (KAZ)
Half-heavyweight (−100 kg)	Benjamin Fletcher (IRL)	Ramazan Malsuigenov (RUS)	Leonardo Gonçalves (BRA)
Heavyweight (+100 kg)	Oleksandr Gordiienko (UKR)	Javad Mahjoub (IRI)	Ruslan Shakhbazov (RUS)
Heavyweight (+100 kg)	Oleksandr Gordiienko (UKR)	Javad Mahjoub (IRI)	Tamerlan Bashaev (RUS)

=== Women's events ===
Event	Gold	Silver	Bronze
Extra-lightweight (−48 kg)	Daria Bilodid (UKR)	Alexandra Pop (ROU)	Mei Tanaka (JPN)
Extra-lightweight (−48 kg)	Daria Bilodid (UKR)	Alexandra Pop (ROU)	Maryna Cherniak (UKR)
Half-lightweight (−52 kg)	Jéssica Pereira (BRA)	Distria Krasniqi (KOS)	Mai Kose (JPN)
Half-lightweight (−52 kg)	Jéssica Pereira (BRA)	Distria Krasniqi (KOS)	Anja Štangar (SLO)
Lightweight (−57 kg)	Nora Gjakova (KOS)	Kwon You-jeong (KOR)	Miryam Roper (PAN)
Lightweight (−57 kg)	Nora Gjakova (KOS)	Kwon You-jeong (KOR)	Sarah-Léonie Cysique (FRA)
Half-middleweight (−63 kg)	Tina Trstenjak (SLO)	Aimi Nouchi (JPN)	Katharina Haecker (AUS)
Half-middleweight (−63 kg)	Tina Trstenjak (SLO)	Aimi Nouchi (JPN)	Magdalena Krssakova (AUT)
Middleweight (−70 kg)	Kim Polling (NED)	Roxane Taeymans (BEL)	Gemma Howell (GBR)
Middleweight (−70 kg)	Kim Polling (NED)	Roxane Taeymans (BEL)	Saki Niizoe (JPN)
Half-heavyweight (−78 kg)	Mao Izumi (JPN)	Karen Stevenson (NED)	Chloé Buttigieg (FRA)
Half-heavyweight (−78 kg)	Mao Izumi (JPN)	Karen Stevenson (NED)	Klara Apotekar (SLO)
Heavyweight (+78 kg)	Maryna Slutskaya (BLR)	Beatriz Souza (BRA)	Galyna Tarasova (UKR)
Heavyweight (+78 kg)	Maryna Slutskaya (BLR)	Beatriz Souza (BRA)	Nihel Cheikh Rouhou (TUN)

Source Results

=== Medal table ===
* Host nation (Tunisia)

Rank	Nation	Gold	Silver	Bronze	Total
1	Kazakhstan (KAZ)	2	0	3	5
2	Ukraine (UKR)	2	0	2	4
3	Japan (JPN)	1	2	6	9
4	Kosovo (KOS)	1	2	0	3
5	Russia (RUS)	1	1	3	5
6	Brazil (BRA)	1	1	2	4
6	Slovenia (SLO)	1	1	2	4
8	Netherlands (NED)	1	1	1	3
9	France (FRA)	1	0	2	3
10	Uzbekistan (UZB)	1	0	1	2
11	Belarus (BLR)	1	0	0	1
11	Ireland (IRL)	1	0	0	1
13	Belgium (BEL)	0	1	0	1
13	Hungary (HUN)	0	1	0	1
13	Iran (IRI)	0	1	0	1
13	Romania (ROU)	0	1	0	1
13	South Korea (KOR)	0	1	0	1
13	Turkey (TUR)	0	1	0	1
19	Australia (AUS)	0	0	1	1
19	Austria (AUT)	0	0	1	1
19	Czech Republic (CZE)	0	0	1	1
19	Great Britain (GBR)	0	0	1	1
19	Panama (PAN)	0	0	1	1
19	Tunisia (TUN)*	0	0	1	1
Totals (24 entries)		14	14	28	56
