= Dai Aoki =

Japanese judoka

Personal information
- Nationality: Japanese
- Born: 24 October 1994 (age 31)
- Occupation: Judoka

Sport
- Country: Japan
- Sport: Judo
- Weight class: –60 kg
Medal record
Men's judo
Representing Japan
IJF Grand Prix
Gold medal – first place	2016 Budapest	‍–‍60 kg
Silver medal – second place	2018 The Hague	‍–‍60 kg
Bronze medal – third place	2020 Tel Aviv	‍–‍60 kg

Profile at external databases
- IJF: 28720
- JudoInside.com: 92552
- Updated on 21 May 2023

Dai Aoki (born 24 October 1994) is a Japanese judoka.

He is the gold medallist of the 2016 Judo Grand Prix Budapest in the ‍–‍60 kg category.
