= 2013 World Judo Juniors Championships =

Judo competition

Judo 2013 World Judo Juniors Championships
- Location: Ljubljana, Slovenia
- Dates: 24–27 October 2013
- Competitors: 726 from 89 nations

Champions
- Men's team: Georgia (1st title)
- Women's team: Japan (1st title)

Competition at external databases
- Links: IJF • JudoInside

The 2013 World Judo Juniors Championships was an edition of the World Judo Juniors Championships, organised by the International Judo Federation. It was held in Ljubljana, Slovenia from 24 to 27 October 2013. The final day of competition featured men's and women's team events. The men's event was won by team Georgia and the Women's by team Japan.

== Medal summary ==
=== Men's events ===
Event	Gold	Silver	Bronze
−55 kg	Vincent Manquest (FRA)	Armando Maita (VEN)	Leri Chelidze (GEO)
−55 kg	Vincent Manquest (FRA)	Armando Maita (VEN)	Vitor Torrente (BRA)
−60 kg	An Ba-ul (KOR)	Diyorbek Urozboev (UZB)	Ahmet Şahin Kaba (TUR)
−60 kg	An Ba-ul (KOR)	Diyorbek Urozboev (UZB)	Yuma Oshima (JPN)
−66 kg	Yuuki Hashiguchi (JPN)	Sho Tateyama (JPN)	Adrian Gomboc (SLO)
−66 kg	Yuuki Hashiguchi (JPN)	Sho Tateyama (JPN)	Jeremy Moreira (FRA)
−73 kg	Antonio Esposito (ITA)	Sarvar Shomurodov (UZB)	Gabriel Mendes (BRA)
−73 kg	Antonio Esposito (ITA)	Sarvar Shomurodov (UZB)	Vedat Albayrak (GRE)
−81 kg	Alexios Ntanatsidis (GRE)	Kenya Kohara (JPN)	Mammadali Mehdiyev (AZE)
−81 kg	Alexios Ntanatsidis (GRE)	Kenya Kohara (JPN)	Dominic Ressel (GER)
−90 kg	Beka Gviniashvili (GEO)	Samat Yessen (KAZ)	Patryk Ciechomski (POL)
−90 kg	Beka Gviniashvili (GEO)	Samat Yessen (KAZ)	Henrique Silva (BRA)
−100 kg	Kyle Reyes (CAN)	Kim Lee-hyun (KOR)	Toma Nikiforov (BEL)
−100 kg	Kyle Reyes (CAN)	Kim Lee-hyun (KOR)	Ryuko Ogawa (JPN)
+100 kg	Anton Krivobokov (RUS)	Ölziibayaryn Düürenbayar (MGL)	Levani Matiashvili (GEO)
+100 kg	Anton Krivobokov (RUS)	Ölziibayaryn Düürenbayar (MGL)	Ruan Isquierdo (BRA)
Team	Georgia	Greece	Ukraine
Team	Georgia	Greece	Japan

=== Women's events ===
Event	Gold	Silver	Bronze
−44 kg	Anastasia Pavlenko (RUS)	Andreea Stefanescu (ROU)	Olfa Saoudi (TUN)
−44 kg	Anastasia Pavlenko (RUS)	Andreea Stefanescu (ROU)	Honoka Yamauchi (JPN)
−48 kg	Irina Dolgova (RUS)	Alexandra Pop (ROU)	Amandine Buchard (FRA)
−48 kg	Irina Dolgova (RUS)	Alexandra Pop (ROU)	Tamami Yamazaki (JPN)
−52 kg	Sappho Çoban (GER)	Jéssica Pereira (BRA)	Alexandra-Larisa Florian (ROU)
−52 kg	Sappho Çoban (GER)	Jéssica Pereira (BRA)	Odette Giuffrida (ITA)
−57 kg	Arleta Podolak (POL)	Catherine Beauchemin-Pinard (CAN)	Christa Deguchi (JPN)
−57 kg	Arleta Podolak (POL)	Catherine Beauchemin-Pinard (CAN)	Fabienne Kocher (SUI)
−63 kg	Do Velema (NED)	Megumi Horikawa (JPN)	Baldorjyn Möngönchimeg (MGL)
−63 kg	Do Velema (NED)	Megumi Horikawa (JPN)	Maylín del Toro Carvajal (CUB)
−70 kg	Barbara Matić (CRO)	Chizuru Arai (JPN)	Szaundra Diedrich (GER)
−70 kg	Barbara Matić (CRO)	Chizuru Arai (JPN)	Margaux Pinot (FRA)
−78 kg	Shiori Yoshimura (JPN)	Samanta Soares (BRA)	Madeleine Malonga (FRA)
−78 kg	Shiori Yoshimura (JPN)	Samanta Soares (BRA)	Brigita Matić-Ljuba (CRO)
+78 kg	Nami Inamori (JPN)	Carolin Weiß (GER)	Sibilla Faccholli (BRA)
+78 kg	Nami Inamori (JPN)	Carolin Weiß (GER)	Clarissa Taube (GER)
Team	Japan	France	Croatia
Team	Japan	France	Germany

Source Results

=== Medal table ===
* Host nation (Slovenia)

Rank	Nation	Gold	Silver	Bronze	Total
1	Japan (JPN)	3	4	5	12
2	Russia (RUS)	3	0	0	3
3	Germany (GER)	1	1	3	5
4	Canada (CAN)	1	1	0	2
4	South Korea (KOR)	1	1	0	2
6	France (FRA)	1	0	4	5
7	Georgia (GEO)	1	0	2	3
8	Croatia (CRO)	1	0	1	2
8	Greece (GRE)	1	0	1	2
8	Italy (ITA)	1	0	1	2
8	Poland (POL)	1	0	1	2
12	Netherlands (NED)	1	0	0	1
13	Brazil (BRA)	0	2	5	7
14	Romania (ROU)	0	2	1	3
15	Uzbekistan (UZB)	0	2	0	2
16	Mongolia (MGL)	0	1	1	2
17	Kazakhstan (KAZ)	0	1	0	1
17	Venezuela (VEN)	0	1	0	1
19	Azerbaijan (AZE)	0	0	1	1
19	Belgium (BEL)	0	0	1	1
19	Cuba (CUB)	0	0	1	1
19	Slovenia (SLO)*	0	0	1	1
19	Switzerland (SUI)	0	0	1	1
19	Tunisia (TUN)	0	0	1	1
19	Turkey (TUR)	0	0	1	1
Totals (25 entries)		16	16	32	64
