= Aimi Nouchi =

Japanese judoka (born 1996)

Personal information
- Nationality: Japanese
- Born: 14 January 1996 (age 30)
- Occupation: Judoka

Sport
- Country: Japan
- Sport: Judo
- Weight class: –63 kg
Medal record
Women's judo
Representing Japan
IJF Grand Slam
Gold medal – first place	2016 Tyumen	–63 kg
Gold medal – first place	2018 Ekaterinburg	–63 kg
Bronze medal – third place	2018 Osaka	–63 kg
IJF Grand Prix
Gold medal – first place	2018 Hohhot	–63 kg
Gold medal – first place	2018 Budapest	–63 kg
Silver medal – second place	2018 Tunis	–63 kg
Bronze medal – third place	2019 Hohhot	–63 kg
Summer Universiade
Gold medal – first place	2017 Taipei	–63 kg

Profile at external databases
- IJF: 22352
- JudoInside.com: 85827
- Updated on 25 November 2022

Aimi Nouchi (born 14 January 1996) is a Japanese judoka.

She is the gold medallist of the 2016 Judo Grand Slam Tyumen in the -63 kg category.
