= 2015 World Judo Championships – Men's 60 kg =

Judo competition

Judo Men's 60 kg at the 2015 World Judo Championships
- Venue: Alau Ice Palace
- Location: Astana, Kazakhstan
- Date: 24 August
- Competitors: 62 from 56 nations
- Total prize money: 14,000$

Medalists
gold medal	Yeldos Smetov (1st title)	Kazakhstan
silver medal	Rustam Ibrayev	Kazakhstan
bronze medal	Toru Shishime	Japan
bronze medal	Kim Won-jin	South Korea

Competition at external databases
- Links: IJF • JudoInside

The men's 60 kg competition of the 2015 World Judo Championships was held on 24 August 2015.

== Results ==
=== Finals ===
Semi-finals
(Mongolia) Ganbatyn Boldbaatar	000
(Kazakhstan) Rustam Ibrayev	001
(Japan) Toru Shishime	000
(Kazakhstan) Yeldos Smetov	001

Final
(Kazakhstan) Rustam Ibrayev	000
(Kazakhstan) Yeldos Smetov	000

=== Repechage ===
Repechage		Third place
(Brazil) Felipe Kitadai	000
(South Korea) Choi In-hyuk	000	(Brazil) Felipe Kitadai	000
		(Japan) Toru Shishime	100

Repechage		Third place
(South Korea) Kim Won-jin	100
(Uzbekistan) Diyorbek Urozboev	000	(South Korea) Kim Won-jin	001
		(Mongolia) Ganbatyn Boldbaatar	000

=== Pool A ===
First Round
(Albania) Indrit Çullhaj	000
(Turkey) Bekir Özlü	100
(Israel) Tommy Arshansky	100
(Eswatini) Nkululeko Sihlongonyane	000
(France) Vincent Limare	010
(Armenia) Hovhannes Davtyan	000
(Benin) Jacob Gnahoui	010
(Zambia) Michael Mwabi	001
(Kyrgyzstan) Otar Bestaev	000
(Brazil) Felipe Kitadai	111
(Guatemala) José Ramos	100
(Mozambique) Neuso Sigauque	000

Second Round
(Mongolia) Ganbatyn Boldbaatar	001
(Turkey) Bekir Özlü	000
(Libya) Mohamed El-Kawisah	000
(Israel) Tommy Arshansky	100
(France) Vincent Limare	101
(Benin) Jacob Gnahoui	000
(Brazil) Felipe Kitadai	100
(Guatemala) José Ramos	000

Third Round
(Mongolia) Ganbatyn Boldbaatar	000
(Israel) Tommy Arshansky	000
(France) Vincent Limare	000
(Brazil) Felipe Kitadai	000

Quarterfinals
(Mongolia) Ganbatyn Boldbaatar	100
(Brazil) Felipe Kitadai	000

=== Pool B ===
First Round
(Uzbekistan) Sharafuddin Lutfillaev	100
(Palestine) Simon Yacoub	000
(South Korea) Choi In-hyuk	000
(Greece) Ioannis Papachristidis	000
(China) An Jianqi	002
(Peru) Juan Postigos	000
(Malawi) Emmanuel Ndawu	000
(Belarus) Arif Bagirov	100
(Georgia (country)) Amiran Papinasvili	011
(Lebanon) Damien Ziade	000
(Luxembourg) Tom Schmit	000
(Netherlands) Jeroen Mooren	100
(Kazakhstan) Rustam Ibrayev	001
(Bulgaria) Yanislav Gerchev	000
(Madagascar) Janeiro Chan Ling	000
(Ecuador) Lenin Preciado	100

Second Round
(Uzbekistan) Sharafuddin Lutfillaev	000
(South Korea) Choi In-hyuk	001
(China) An Jianqi	100
(Belarus) Arif Bagirov	000
(Georgia (country)) Amiran Papinasvili	001
(Netherlands) Jeroen Mooren	000
(Kazakhstan) Rustam Ibrayev	001
(Ecuador) Lenin Preciado	000

Third Round
(South Korea) Choi In-hyuk	012
(China) An Jianqi	000
(Georgia (country)) Amiran Papinasvili	001
(Kazakhstan) Rustam Ibrayev	011

Quarterfinals
(South Korea) Choi In-hyuk	000
(Kazakhstan) Rustam Ibrayev	010

=== Pool C ===
First Round
(Djibouti) Houmed Moktar	000
(Cuba) Yandry Torres	100
(Czech Republic) Pavel Petřikov	012
(Cyprus) Irodotos Kelpis	000
(Mongolia) Tsendochir Tsogtbaatar	100
(Switzerland) Ludovic Chammartin	000
(Japan) Toru Shishime	101
(Morocco) Mohamed Jafy	000
(Chinese Taipei) Tsai Ming-yen	100
(Monaco) Yann Siccardi	000
(Brazil) Eric Takabatake	100
(China) Li Hui	000
(Spain) Francisco Garrigós	100
(Austria) Ludwig Paischer	000

Second Round
(South Korea) Kim Won-jin	100
(Cuba) Yandry Torres	000
(Czech Republic) Pavel Petřikov	000
(Mongolia) Tsendochir Tsogtbaatar	100
(Japan) Toru Shishime	010
(Chinese Taipei) Tsai Ming-yen	000
(Brazil) Eric Takabatake	000
(Spain) Francisco Garrigós	000

Third Round
(South Korea) Kim Won-jin	001
(Mongolia) Tsendochir Tsogtbaatar	000
(Japan) Toru Shishime	000
(Brazil) Eric Takabatake	000

Quarterfinals
(South Korea) Kim Won-jin	000
(Japan) Toru Shishime	000

=== Pool D ===
First Round
(Uzbekistan) Diyorbek Urozboev	011
(Turkey) Ahmet Kaba	001
(United States) Aaron Kunihiro	100
(Kyrgyzstan) Argen Bakytbek	000
(Hong Kong) Yu Kin Ting	000
(Canada) Sergio Pessoa	000
(Kazakhstan) Yeldos Smetov	100
(Finland) Juho Reinvall	000
(Mauritius) Pascal Laurent	000
(Saudi Arabia) Eisa Majrashi	100
(Mexico) Nabor Castillo	100
(Rwanda) Ayubu Mugabo	000
(Cameroon) Bernadin Tsala Tsala	000
(Portugal) Nuno Carvalho	100

Second Round
(Russia) Beslan Mudranov	000
(Uzbekistan) Diyorbek Urozboev	100
(United States) Aaron Kunihiro	100
(Canada) Sergio Pessoa	000
(Kazakhstan) Yeldos Smetov	100
(Saudi Arabia) Eisa Majrashi	000
(Mexico) Nabor Castillo	000
(Portugal) Nuno Carvalho	000

Third Round
(Uzbekistan) Diyorbek Urozboev	100
(United States) Aaron Kunihiro	000
(Kazakhstan) Yeldos Smetov	002
(Mexico) Nabor Castillo	000

Quarterfinals
(Uzbekistan) Diyorbek Urozboev	010
(Kazakhstan) Yeldos Smetov	011

== Prize money ==
The sums listed bring the total prizes awarded to 14,000$ for the individual event.

Medal	Total	Judoka	Coach
Gold	6,000$	4,800$	1,200$
Silver	4,000$	3,200$	800$
Bronze	2,000$	1,600$	400$
