= 2013 World Judo Championships – Men's 60 kg =

Judo competition

Judo Men's 60 kg at the 2013 World Judo Championships
- Venue: Ginásio do Maracanãzinho
- Location: Rio de Janeiro, Brazil
- Date: 26 August 2013
- Competitors: 61 from 53 nations

Medalists
gold medal	Naohisa Takato (1st title)	Japan
silver medal	Dashdavaagiin Amartüvshin	Mongolia
bronze medal	Kim Won-Jin	South Korea
bronze medal	Orkhan Safarov	Azerbaijan

Competition at external databases
- Links: IJF • JudoInside

The men's 60 kg competition of the 2013 World Judo Championships was held on August 26.

== Medalists ==
Gold	Silver	Bronze
Naohisa Takato (JPN)	Dashdavaagiin Amartüvshin (MGL)	Kim Won-Jin (KOR); Orkhan Safarov (AZE)

== Results ==
=== Pool A ===
First Round
(Zimbabwe) Lazarus Arufandika	000
(Turkey) Ahmet Şahin Kaba	100
(Belarus) Vae Tutkhalian	000
(Germany) Tobias Englmaier	100
(Iraq) Kadhim Kadhim	000
(Uzbekistan) Diyorbek Urozboev	101
(Kazakhstan) Askhat Telmanov	101
(Australia) Tom Pappas	000
(China) Li Can	100
(Madagascar) Janeiro Chan Ling	000
(Armenia) Hovhannes Davtyan	000
(Azerbaijan) Ilgar Mushkiyev	000
(Argentina) Hernan Birbrier	101
(Paraguay) Lucas Cogliolo	000

Quarterfinals
(Georgia (country)) Amiran Papinashvili	100
(Turkey) Ahmet Şahin Kaba	000
(Germany) Tobias Englmaier	110
(Uzbekistan) Diyorbek Urozboev	000
(Kazakhstan) Askhat Telmanov	101
(China) Li Can	000
(Azerbaijan) Ilgar Mushkiyev	100
(Argentina) Hernan Birbrier	000

Semifinals
(Georgia (country)) Amiran Papinashvili	002
(Germany) Tobias Englmaier	000
(Kazakhstan) Askhat Telmanov	100
(Azerbaijan) Ilgar Mushkiyev	001

Final
(Georgia (country)) Amiran Papinashvili	112
(Kazakhstan) Askhat Telmanov	001

=== Pool B ===
First Round
(Mongolia) Dashdavaagiin Amartüvshin	100
(North Korea) Jang Hyok-Chol	000
(Portugal) Nuno Carvalho	010
(Morocco) Yassine Moudatir	100
(Mozambique) Neuso Sigauque	101
(Djibouti) Houmed Moktar	000
(Lebanon) Damien Ziade	000
(Austria) Ludwig Paischer	100
(Mongolia) Ganbatyn Boldbaatar	100
(Colombia) John Futtinico	000
(Netherlands) Mikos Salminen	100
(Czech Republic) Pavel Petříkov	000
(Switzerland) Michael Iten	000
(Finland) Juho Reinvall	100
(Bulgaria) Yanislav Gerchev	002
(United Kingdom) Ashley McKenzie	000

Quarterfinals
(Mongolia) Dashdavaagiin Amartüvshin	101
(Morocco) Yassine Moudatir	000
(Mozambique) Neuso Sigauque	000
(Austria) Ludwig Paischer	100
(Mongolia) Ganbatyn Boldbaatar	100
(Netherlands) Mikos Salminen	000
(Finland) Juho Reinvall	000
(Bulgaria) Yanislav Gerchev	110

Semifinals
(Mongolia) Dashdavaagiin Amartüvshin	100
(Austria) Ludwig Paischer	000
(Mongolia) Ganbatyn Boldbaatar	102
(Bulgaria) Yanislav Gerchev	000

Final
(Mongolia) Dashdavaagiin Amartüvshin	000
(Mongolia) Ganbatyn Boldbaatar	000

=== Pool C ===
First Round
(Hungary) László Burján	111
(Benin) Jacob Gnahoui	000
(Kuwait) Abdalla Al-Maraghy	100
(Hong Kong) Yu Kin Ting	000
(Venezuela) Javier Guédez	110
(Angola) Nayr Garcia Pedro	000
(Kazakhstan) Yeldos Smetov	100
(Eswatini) Nkululeko Sihlongonyane	000
(China) Tang Xiaolong	100
(Chinese Taipei) Tsai Ming-yen	012
(Poland) Łukasz Kiełbasiński	100
(New Zealand) Lee Bronkhorst	000
(Mexico) Nabor Castillo	100
(Switzerland) Ludovic Chammartin	000

Quarterfinals
(Japan) Naohisa Takato	100
(Hungary) László Burján	000
(Kuwait) Abdalla Al-Maraghy	000
(Venezuela) Javier Guédez	011
(Kazakhstan) Yeldos Smetov	100
(China) Tang Xiaolong	000
(Poland) Łukasz Kiełbasiński	001
(Mexico) Nabor Castillo	000

Semifinals
(Japan) Naohisa Takato	101
(Venezuela) Javier Guédez	000
(Kazakhstan) Yeldos Smetov	010
(Poland) Łukasz Kiełbasiński	000

Final
(Japan) Naohisa Takato	001
(Kazakhstan) Yeldos Smetov	000

=== Pool D ===
First Round
(South Korea) Kim Won-Jin	100
(Peru) Juan Postigos	000
(Yemen) Ali Khousrof	000
(Canada) Sergio Pessoa	101
(Belarus) Arif Bagirov	110
(Finland) Valtteri Jokinen	000
(Russia) Beslan Mudranov	000
(Azerbaijan) Orkhan Safarov	010
(United States) Nicholas Kossor	110
(Ecuador) Lenin Preciado	000
(Israel) Tommy Arshansky	011
(Netherlands) Jeroen Mooren	000
(Jordan) Ghaith Nayef	000
(Cyprus) Irodotos Kelpis	010

Quarterfinals
(Brazil) Felipe Kitadai	000
(South Korea) Kim Won-Jin	010
(Canada) Sergio Pessoa	001
(Belarus) Arif Bagirov	000
(Azerbaijan) Orkhan Safarov	100
(United States) Nicholas Kossor	000
(Israel) Tommy Arshansky	100
(Cyprus) Irodotos Kelpis	000

Semifinals
(South Korea) Kim Won-Jin	101
(Canada) Sergio Pessoa	000
(Azerbaijan) Orkhan Safarov	101
(Israel) Tommy Arshansky	001

Final
(South Korea) Kim Won-Jin	111
(Azerbaijan) Orkhan Safarov	010

=== Finals ===
Semi-finals
(Georgia (country)) Amiran Papinashvili	000
(Mongolia) Dashdavaagiin Amartüvshin	100
(Japan) Naohisa Takato	020
(South Korea) Kim Won-Jin	000

Final
(Mongolia) Dashdavaagiin Amartüvshin	000
(Japan) Naohisa Takato	000

=== Repechage ===
Repechage		Third place
(Kazakhstan) Askhat Telmanov	000
(Mongolia) Ganbatyn Boldbaatar	000	(Mongolia) Ganbatyn Boldbaatar	000
		(South Korea) Kim Won-Jin	010

Repechage		Third place
(Kazakhstan) Yeldos Smetov	000
(Azerbaijan) Orkhan Safarov	001	(Azerbaijan) Orkhan Safarov	100
		(Georgia (country)) Amiran Papinashvili	000
