= 2016 European Judo Championships – Men's 60 kg =

Judo Men's 60 kg at the 2016 European Judo Championships
- Venue: TatNeft Arena
- Location: Kazan, Russia
- Date: 21 April
- Competitors: 30 from 24 nations

Medalists
gold medal	Walide Khyar (1st title)	France
silver medal	Orkhan Safarov	Azerbaijan
bronze medal	Hovhannes Davtyan	Armenia
bronze medal	Elios Manzi	Italy

Competition at external databases
- Links: IJF • JudoInside

The men's 60 kg competition at the 2016 European Judo Championships was held on 21 April at the TatNeft Arena, in Kazan, Russia.

== Results ==
=== Finals ===
Semi-finals
Orkhan Safarov (AZE)	10
Elios Manzi (ITA)	00
Walide Khyar (FRA)	00
Bekir Özlü (TUR)	00

Final
Orkhan Safarov (AZE)	01
Walide Khyar (FRA)	10

=== Repechage ===
Repechage
Jeroen Mooren (NED)	00
Hovhannes Davtyan (ARM)	10

Third place
Hovhannes Davtyan (ARM)	11
Bekir Özlü (TUR)	01

Repechage
Amiran Papinashvili (GEO)	00
Ilgar Mushkiyev (AZE)	00

Third place
Amiran Papinashvili (GEO)	00
Elios Manzi (ITA)	00

=== Pool A ===
First round
Tom Schmit (LUX)	00
Arif Bagirov (BLR)	10
Jeroen Mooren (NED)	10
Denys Bilichenko (UKR)	00
Senne Wyns (BEL)	00
Nuno Carvalho (POR)	01

Round of 16
Orkhan Safarov (AZE)	10
Arif Bagirov (BLR)	00
Jeroen Mooren (NED)	00
Nuno Carvalho (POR)	00

Quarterfinals
Orkhan Safarov (AZE)	00
Jeroen Mooren (NED)	00

=== Pool B ===
First round
Vincent Limare (FRA)	10
Ahmet Şahin Kaba (TUR)	00
Yann Siccardi (MON)	00
Elios Manzi (ITA)	01
Hovhannes Davtyan (ARM)	10
Ludwig Paischer (AUT)	00
Andrej Klokov (LTU)	00
Pavel Petřikov (CZE)	10

Round of 16
Vincent Limare (FRA)	00
Elios Manzi (ITA)	00
Hovhannes Davtyan (ARM)	00
Pavel Petřikov (CZE)	00

Quarterfinals
Elios Manzi (ITA)	10
Hovhannes Davtyan (ARM)	00

=== Pool C ===
First round
Matjaž Trbovc (SLO)	00
Juho Reinvall (FIN)	10
Ashley McKenzie (GBR)	10
Indrit Cullhaj (ALB)	00
Walide Khyar (FRA)	01
Carmine Di Loreto (ITA)	00

Round of 16
Amiran Papinashvili (GEO)	01
Juho Reinvall (FIN)	00
Ashley McKenzie (GBR)	00
Walide Khyar (FRA)	01

Quarterfinals
Amiran Papinashvili (GEO)	00
Walide Khyar (FRA)	10

=== Pool D ===
First round
Ilgar Mushkiyev (AZE)	01
Gonçalo Mansinho (POR)	00
Tommy Arshansky (ISR)	01
Francisco Garrigós (ESP)	00
Bekir Özlü (TUR)	10
Garik Harutyunyan (ARM)	00
Ludovic Chammartin (SUI)	00
Yanislav Gerchev (BUL)	10

Round of 16
Ilgar Mushkiyev (AZE)	01
Tommy Arshansky (ISR)	00
Bekir Özlü (TUR)	01
Yanislav Gerchev (BUL)	00

Quarterfinals
Ilgar Mushkiyev (AZE)	00
Bekir Özlü (TUR)	01
