= Naohisa Takato =

Japanese judoka (born 1993)

Personal information
- Native name: 髙藤 直寿
- Born: 30 May 1993 (age 33) Hasuda, Saitama, Japan
- Home town: Tokyo, Japan
- Education: Tokai University
- Occupation: Judoka
- Height: 160 cm (5 ft 3 in)

Sport
- Country: Japan
- Sport: Judo
- Weight class: ‍–‍60 kg
- Rank: 5th dan black belt
- Club: Park24
- Team: All Japan National Team
- Coached by: Minoru Konegawa
- Retired: 9 March 2026

Achievements and titles
- Olympic Games: (gold) (2020)
- World Champ.: (2013, 2017, 2018, 2022)
- Asian Champ.: (gold) (2017, 2021)
Medal record
Men's judo
Representing Japan
Olympic Games
Gold medal – first place	2020 Tokyo	‍–‍60 kg
Bronze medal – third place	2016 Rio de Janeiro	‍–‍60 kg
World Championships
Gold medal – first place	2013 Rio de Janeiro	‍–‍60 kg
Gold medal – first place	2017 Budapest	‍–‍60 kg
Gold medal – first place	2018 Baku	‍–‍60 kg
Gold medal – first place	2022 Tashkent	‍–‍60 kg
Bronze medal – third place	2014 Chelyabinsk	‍–‍60 kg
Asian Championships
Gold medal – first place	2017 Hong Kong	‍–‍60 kg
Gold medal – first place	2021 Bishkek	‍–‍60 kg
World Masters
Gold medal – first place	2013 Tyumen	‍–‍60 kg
Gold medal – first place	2015 Rabat	‍–‍60 kg
Bronze medal – third place	2023 Budapest	‍–‍60 kg
IJF Grand Slam
Gold medal – first place	2012 Moscow	‍–‍60 kg
Gold medal – first place	2012 Tokyo	‍–‍60 kg
Gold medal – first place	2013 Paris	‍–‍60 kg
Gold medal – first place	2013 Tokyo	‍–‍60 kg
Gold medal – first place	2015 Paris	‍–‍60 kg
Gold medal – first place	2015 Tokyo	‍–‍60 kg
Gold medal – first place	2017 Paris	‍–‍60 kg
Gold medal – first place	2017 Tokyo	‍–‍60 kg
Gold medal – first place	2019 Paris	‍–‍60 kg
Gold medal – first place	2019 Osaka	‍–‍60 kg
Gold medal – first place	2020 Düsseldorf	‍–‍60 kg
Silver medal – second place	2016 Tokyo	‍–‍60 kg
Silver medal – second place	2023 Tokyo	‍–‍60 kg
Bronze medal – third place	2011 Tokyo	‍–‍60 kg
IJF Grand Prix
Gold medal – first place	2014 Budapest	‍–‍60 kg
Gold medal – first place	2018 Zagreb	‍–‍60 kg
Gold medal – first place	2019 Montreal	‍–‍60 kg
Silver medal – second place	2011 Qingdao	‍–‍60 kg
World Juniors Championships
Gold medal – first place	2011 Cape Town	‍–‍60 kg
World Cadets Championships
Gold medal – first place	2009 Budapest	‍–‍60 kg

Profile at external databases
- IJF: 9344
- JudoInside.com: 56591
- Updated on 3 December 2023

Naohisa Takato (髙藤直寿, Takatō Naohisa; born 30 May 1993) is a Japanese retired judoka.

Takato was the top ranked judoka in the world in the extra-lightweight division. He became one of judo's most prominent fighters by winning the 2013 World Championships. In the same year, he also won the World Masters in Tyumen, and the prestigious Grand Slams in Paris, Tokyo and a year earlier in Moscow 2012. With these successes, Takato was ranked No. 1 in the world in 2013 and 2014. He had an all-win record in 2013. Specializing in drop kata guruma, his physical and technical fighting style has become iconic in judo.

Takato was one of the most searched judokas in 2015. He once was the most decorated judoka on the IJF World Tour, having notably won eleven gold medals in Grand Slam competitions.

Takato won a bronze medal as Japan's extra-lightweight representative at the 2016 Olympics and won the gold medal in the same event at the 2020 Olympics held in Tokyo, Japan.

== Early life ==
Takato began judo at the age of 7. He joined Nogi-machi judo club as an elementary school student, which was also attended by future teammate Masashi Ebinuma. He had won in various weight divisions throughout elementary and middle school.

An alma mater of Sagami junior high and high school, he won several national titles representing the school as well as the world cadet championships. He started attending Tokai University in 2012, and had graduated in 2016.

== Career ==
=== 2016 Grand Slam Tokyo ===
Takato returned to the Tokyo Grand Slam at the 2016 edition for his first outing after the Olympics. He faced Yanislav Gerchev of Bulgaria in his first fight, and showed his form with sode tsurikomi goshi, successfully scoring yuko and waza-ari with the skill. He then faced Korea's Choi In-hyuk in a deadlocked fight. Despite being scoreless, Choi was penalised twice for passivity, driving Takato through to the semi-final. The bout was another tight fight as scores were nil, neither being able to successfully throw. After nearly ten minutes of play, Takato finally had a breakthrough with kosoto gari for yuko for a place in the final.

It was an all-Japan bout in the final, with Ryuju Nagayama as his opponent. Both are trained by Minoru Konegawa, and had a 48 place difference in world rankings, with Takato ranked seventh and Nagayama 56th at the time. Takato attempted throughout the bout to bring the fight to newaza, however was unable to break Nagayama's defense. He most notably used sankaku jime. With one minute left, Takato attempted ashi guruma, but was unsuccessful and was left with a disadvantageous position as Nagayama was standing up. Nagayama then used uchi mata to throw Takato for ippon. The upset left Takato smiling as he congratulated Nagayama, settling for a silver medal.

=== 2017 Grand Slam Paris ===
Takato opened his international competition in 2017 with the Paris Grand Slam. This would be the first event that would utilise revised rules of judo. He faced local Vincent Manquest in his first fight and scored waza-ari with seoi nage. He then earned ippon with kesa-gatame after bringing the fight to the ground, going through to round 3. Takato fired an early waza-ari with kouchi gari, and scored a second using ouchi gari. He then transitioned to newaza, pinning his opponent again with kesa gatame, showing a versatility masterclass.

In the quarter-final he faced Georgia's Amiran Papinashvili. The bout only lasted 40 seconds, as Takato threw him for ippon with kouchi gari. He then went against Azerbaijan's Orkhan Safarov, who was the only fighter in the tournament to throw Takato for a score with kosoto gari. However, with Takato scoring two waza-aris, both using kouchi gari, and then eventually scoring ippon, he was through to the final. Takato won his final fight by waza-ari, again with kouchi gari, and another newaza ippon with ushiro yoko shiho gatame. This would be Takato's third win at Paris, having won in 2013 and 2015. With this victory, he ranked world number one, and had an all-ippon tournament.

== Fighting style ==
He is known for having a more modern style of fighting than traditional Japanese judo, with kata guruma being one of his favorite techniques.

== Rivalries ==
Takato's international rivals include Dashdavaagiin Amartüvshin, Kim Won-jin, Yeldos Smetov, Ganbatyn Boldbaatar and Beslan Mudranov. He has competed against them a total of twenty times.

== Personal life ==
Takato married in 2014 and has a son who was born on 25 August that year.

== Competitive record ==
Judo record
Total	84 (100%)
Wins	74 (88.1%)
by Ippon	50 (59.5%)
Losses	10 (11.9%)
by Ippon	8 (9.5%)

(as of 11 February 2017)

== Medal record ==
2009
(gold) World U17 Championships −60 kg, Budapest
2011
(gold) World U20 Championships −60 kg, Cape Town
(silver) Grand Prix −60 kg, Qingdao
(bronze) Grand Slam −60 kg, Tokyo
2012
(gold) Grand Slam −60 kg, Moscow
(gold) Grand Slam −60 kg, Tokyo
(gold) World Cup −60 kg, Tashkent
2013
(gold) Grand Slam −60 kg, Paris
(gold) Masters −60 kg, Tyumen
(gold) World Championships −60 kg, Rio de Janeiro
(gold) Grand Slam −60 kg, Tokyo
2014
(gold) Grand Prix −60 kg, Budapest
(bronze) World Championships −60 kg, Chelyabinsk
2015
(gold) Masters −60 kg, Tyumen
(gold) Grand Slam −60 kg, Paris
(gold) Grand Slam −60 kg, Tokyo
2016
(bronze) Olympic Games −60 kg, Rio de Janeiro
(silver) Grand Slam −60 kg, Tokyo
2017
(gold) Grand Slam −60 kg, Paris
(gold) Grand Slam −60 kg, Tokyo
2018
(gold) Grand Prix −60 kg, Zagreb
2021
(gold) Olympic Games −60 kg, Tokyo
