= List of judoka at the 2016 Summer Olympics =

== Men's events ==
=== Extra-lightweight (60 kg) ===
Felipe Kitadai – Brazil

Mohamed El-Kawisah – Libya

Kim Won-jin – South Korea

Naohisa Takato – Japan

=== Half-lightweight (66 kg) ===
Charles Chibana – Brazil

An Baul – South Korea

Masashi Ebinuma – Japan

=== Lightweight (73 kg) ===
Alex Pombo – Brazil

An Changrim – South Korea

Shohei Ono – Japan

Hong Kuk-hyon – North Korea

=== Half-middleweight (81 kg) ===
Victor Penalber – Brazil

Lee Seung-soo – South Korea

Takanori Nagase – Japan

Kodo Nakano – Philippines

=== Middleweight (90 kg) ===
Tiago Camilo – Brazil

Gwak Dong-han – South Korea

Mashu Baker – Japan

=== Half-heavyweight (100 kg) ===
Rafael Buzacarini – Brazil

Ryunosuke Haga – Japan

=== Heavyweight (+100 kg) ===
Rafael Silva – Brazil

== Women's events ==
=== Extra-lightweight (48 kg) ===
Sarah Menezes- Brazil

=== Half-lightweight (52 kg) ===
Érika Miranda – Brazil

=== Lightweight (57 kg) ===
Rafaela Silva – Brazil

=== Half-middleweight (63 kg) ===
Mariana Silva – Brazil

=== Middleweight (70 kg) ===
Maria Portela – Brazil

=== Half-heavyweight (78 kg) ===
Mayra Aguiar – Brazil

=== Heavyweight (+78 kg) ===
Maria Suelen Altheman – Brazil
