= 2014 World Judo Championships – Men's 60 kg =

Judo competition

Judo Men's 60 kg at the 2014 World Judo Championships
- Venue: Traktor Ice Arena
- Location: Chelyabinsk, Russia
- Date: 25 August 2014
- Competitors: 61 from 52 nations
- Total prize money: 14,000$

Medalists
gold medal	Boldbaatar Ganbat (1st title)	Mongolia
silver medal	Beslan Mudranov	Russia
bronze medal	Amiran Papinashvili	Georgia
bronze medal	Naohisa Takato	Japan

Competition at external databases
- Links: IJF • JudoInside

The men's 60 kg competition of the 2014 World Judo Championships was held on 25 August.

== Medalists ==
Gold	Silver	Bronze
Boldbaatar Ganbat (MGL)	Beslan Mudranov (RUS)	Amiran Papinashvili (GEO); Naohisa Takato (JPN)

== Results ==
=== Finals ===
Semi-finals
(Japan) Naohisa Takato	001
(Russia) Beslan Mudranov	001
(Georgia (country)) Amiran Papinashvili	000
(Mongolia) Boldbaatar Ganbat	000

Final
(Russia) Beslan Mudranov	000
(Mongolia) Boldbaatar Ganbat	000

=== Repechage ===
Repechage		Third place
(Israel) Tommy Arshansky	100
(South Korea) Choi In-hyuk	000	(Israel) Tommy Arshansky	001
		(Georgia (country)) Amiran Papinashvili	010

Repechage		Third place
(France) Sofiane Milous	000
(Kazakhstan) Aibek Imashev	100	(Kazakhstan) Aibek Imashev	010
		(Japan) Naohisa Takato	100

=== Pool A ===
First Round
(Lithuania) Andrej Klokov	000
(Bulgaria) Yanislav Gerchev	001
(Lebanon) Damien Ziade	100
(Mozambique) Neuso Sigaque	000
(Armenia) Hovhannes Davtyan	101
(Peru) Juan Postigos	000
(Azerbaijan) Ilgar Mushkiyev	000
(Israel) Tommy Arshansky	100
(Saudi Arabia) Eisa Majrashi	000
(Palestine) Simon Yacoub	000
(Cuba) Janier Peña	101
(Pakistan) Syed Samiullah	000
(United States) Nicholas Kossor	000
(Poland) Łukasz Kiełbasiński	100

Quarterfinals
(Japan) Naohisa Takato	011
(Bulgaria) Yanislav Gerchev	000
(Lebanon) Damien Ziade	000
(Armenia) Hovhannes Davtyan	100
(Israel) Tommy Arshansky	100
(Saudi Arabia) Eisa Majrashi	000
(Cuba) Janier Peña	100
(Poland) Łukasz Kiełbasiński	000

Semifinals
(Japan) Naohisa Takato	110
(Armenia) Hovhannes Davtyan	000
(Israel) Tommy Arshansky	010
(Cuba) Janier Peña	000

Final
(Japan) Naohisa Takato	100
(Israel) Tommy Arshansky	000

=== Pool B ===
First Round
(Russia) Beslan Mudranov	110
(Venezuela) Javier Guédez	000
(Kuwait) Abdalla Al-Maraghy	000
(Czech Republic) Pavel Petřikov	100
(Kazakhstan) Yerkebulan Kossayev	010
(Ukraine) Hevorh Hevorhyan	100
(Brazil) Eric Takabatake	100
(Switzerland) Ludovic Chammartin	000
(Azerbaijan) Orkhan Safarov	100
(Nepal) Saroj Maharjan	000
(Kyrgyzstan) Adilet Botokanov	000
(Belarus) Arif Bagirov	100
(Finland) Vadoud Balatkhanov	000
(South Korea) Choi In-hyuk	002
(Argentina) Hernán Birbrier	100
(Burundi) Fabrice Kwizera	000

Quarterfinals
(Russia) Beslan Mudranov	110
(Czech Republic) Pavel Petřikov	000
(Ukraine) Hevorh Hevorhyan	000
(Brazil) Eric Takabatake	100
(Azerbaijan) Orkhan Safarov	102
(Belarus) Arif Bagirov	000
(South Korea) Choi In-hyuk	110
(Argentina) Hernán Birbrier	000

Semifinals
(Russia) Beslan Mudranov	100
(Brazil) Eric Takabatake	000
(Azerbaijan) Orkhan Safarov	000
(South Korea) Choi In-hyuk	000

Final
(Russia) Beslan Mudranov	110
(South Korea) Choi In-hyuk	001

=== Pool C ===
First Round
(Estonia) Elnur Alijev	000
(Netherlands) Jeroen Mooren	100
(United Kingdom) Ashley McKenzie	011
(Austria) Ludwig Paischer	001
(Czech Republic) David Pulkrábek	000
(Mexico) Nabor Castillo	100
(Mongolia) Dashdavaagiin Amartüvshin	001
(France) Sofiane Milous	101
(Saudi Arabia) Abdulaziz Al-Bashi	011
(Hong Kong) Lau Ka Chun	000
(Yemen) Ali Khousrof	001
(Tunisia) Fraj Dhouibi	110
(Monaco) Yann Siccardi	101
(China) He Yunlong	000

Quarterfinals
(Georgia (country)) Amiran Papinashvili	010
(Netherlands) Jeroen Mooren	000
(United Kingdom) Ashley McKenzie	001
(Mexico) Nabor Castillo	000
(France) Sofiane Milous	100
(Saudi Arabia) Abdulaziz Al-Bashi	000
(Tunisia) Fraj Dhouibi	000
(Monaco) Yann Siccardi	000

Semifinals
(Georgia (country)) Amiran Papinashvili	110
(United Kingdom) Ashley McKenzie	000
(France) Sofiane Milous	110
(Monaco) Yann Siccardi	000

Final
(Georgia (country)) Amiran Papinashvili	101
(France) Sofiane Milous	011

=== Pool D ===
First Round
(Peru) Michael Patino	000
(Turkey) Ahmet Kaba	100
(Chinese Taipei) Tsai Ming-yen	110
(Cyprus) Irodotos Kelpis	000
(Rwanda) Ayubu Mugabo	000
(Tajikistan) Kabatullo Aminov	100
(Brazil) Felipe Kitadai	000
(Uzbekistan) Diyorbek Urozboev	101
(Greece) Ioannis Papachristidis	000
(Ecuador) Lenin Preciado	102
(Eswatini) Nkululeko Sihlongonyane	000
(Armenia) Grigor Ivanyan	100
(Kazakhstan) Aibek Imashev	100
(Palestine) Mohammad Mohsen	000

Quarterfinals
(Mongolia) Boldbaatar Ganbat	100
(Turkey) Ahmet Kaba	000
(Chinese Taipei) Tsai Ming-yen	111
(Tajikistan) Kabatullo Aminov	000
(Uzbekistan) Diyorbek Urozboev	110
(Ecuador) Lenin Preciado	000
(Armenia) Grigor Ivanyan	000
(Kazakhstan) Aibek Imashev	100

Semifinals
(Mongolia) Boldbaatar Ganbat	100
(Chinese Taipei) Tsai Ming-yen	000
(Uzbekistan) Diyorbek Urozboev	000
(Kazakhstan) Aibek Imashev	100

Final
(Mongolia) Boldbaatar Ganbat	001
(Kazakhstan) Aibek Imashev	000

== Prize money ==
The sums listed bring the total prizes awarded to 14,000$ for the individual event.

Medal	Total	Judoka	Coach
Gold	6,000$	4,800$	1,200$
Silver	4,000$	3,200$	800$
Bronze	2,000$	1,600$	400$
