= 2015 World Judo Championships – Men's team =

Judo competition

Judo Men's team at the 2015 World Judo Championships
- Venue: Alau Ice Palace
- Location: Astana, Kazakhstan
- Date: 30 August
- Competitors: 70 from 14 nations
- Total prize money: 50,000$

Medalists
| gold medal | Japan (6th title) |
| silver medal | South Korea |
| bronze medal | Mongolia |
| bronze medal | Georgia |

Competition at external databases
- Links: JudoInside

The men's team competition of the 2015 World Judo Championships was held on 30 August.

Each team consisted of five judokas from the –66, 73, 81, 90 and +90 kg categories.

== Medalists ==
| Gold | Silver | Bronze |
|---|---|---|
| Japan; Mashu Baker (–90 kg); Masashi Ebinuma (–66 kg); Takanori Nagase (–81 kg); Riki Nakaya (–73 kg); Shohei Ono (–73 kg); Ryu Shichinohe (+90 kg) | South Korea; An Baul (-66kg); An Chang-rim (-73kg); Lee Seung-soo (-81kg); Gwak Dong-han (-90kg); Kim Sung-Min (+90kg) | Mongolia; Naidangiin Tüvshinbayar (+90 kg); Battulgyn Temüülen (+90 kg); Lkhagvasürengiin Otgonbaatar (–90 kg); Otgonbaataryn Uuganbaatar (-81 kg); Nyamsürengiin Dagvasüren (-81 kg) Sainjargalyn Nyam-Ochir (-73 kg); Ganbaataryn Odbayar (-73 kg); Khashbaataryn Tsagaanbaatar (–66 kg) Davaadorjiin Tömörkhüleg (–66 kg); Ganbatyn Boldbaatar (–66 kg) |
| Japan; Mashu Baker (–90 kg); Masashi Ebinuma (–66 kg); Takanori Nagase (–81 kg); Riki Nakaya (–73 kg); Shohei Ono (–73 kg); Ryu Shichinohe (+90 kg) | South Korea; An Baul (-66kg); An Chang-rim (-73kg); Lee Seung-soo (-81kg); Gwak Dong-han (-90kg); Kim Sung-Min (+90kg) | Georgia; Amiran Papinashvili (–66 kg); Vazha Margvelashvili (–66 kg); Lasha Shavdatuashvili (–73 kg); Nugzar Tatalashvili (–73 kg); Avtandil Tchrikishvili (–81 kg); Ushangi Margiani (–81 kg); Beka Gviniashvili (–90 kg); Varlam Liparteliani (–90 kg); Adam Okruashvili (+90 kg); Levani Matiashvili (+90 kg) |

== Results ==
First Round
Kazakhstan | 5
Australia | 0
Brazil | 3
Uzbekistan | 2
China | 2
Germany | 3
South Korea | 5
France | 0
Georgia | 4
Tunisia | 1
Mongolia | 5
Cuba | 0

Quarterfinals
Japan | 4
Kazakhstan | 1
Brazil | 2
Germany | 3
Russia | 1
South Korea | 4
Georgia | 2
Mongolia | 3

Semifinals
Japan | 3
Germany | 2
South Korea | 4
Mongolia | 1

Final
Japan | 3
South Korea | 2

=== Repechage ===
| Repechage | | Third place |
| Kazakhstan | 4 |
| Brazil | 1 | Kazakhstan | 1 |
| | | Mongolia | 4 |

| Repechage | | Third place |
| Russia | 2 |
| Georgia | 3 | Georgia | 4 |
| | | Germany | 1 |

== Prize money ==
The sums listed bring the total prizes awarded to 50,000$ for the individual event.

| Medal | Total | Judoka | Coach |
|---|---|---|---|
| Gold | 25,000$ | 20,000$ | 5,000$ |
| Silver | 15,000$ | 12,000$ | 3,000$ |
| Bronze | 5,000$ | 4,000$ | 1,000$ |
