= Shishime =

Shishime (written: 志々目) is a Japanese surname. Notable people with the surname include:

- Ai Shishime (志々目 愛, born 1994), Japanese judoka
- Toru Shishime (志々目 徹, born 1992), Japanese judoka
