= Judo at the 2014 Asian Games – Men's 60 kg =

Judo competition

Men's 60 kg at the 2014 Asian Games
- Venue: Dowon Gymnasium
- Date: 20 September 2014
- Competitors: 24 from 24 nations

Medalists
| gold medal | Yeldos Smetov | Kazakhstan |
| silver medal | Ganbatyn Boldbaatar | Mongolia |
| bronze medal | Toru Shishime | Japan |
| bronze medal | Kim Won-jin | South Korea |

The men's 60 kilograms (Extra lightweight) competition at the 2014 Asian Games in Incheon was held on 20 September at the Dowon Gymnasium.

== Schedule ==
All times are Korea Standard Time (UTC+09:00)

| Date | Time | Event |
|---|---|---|
| Saturday, 20 September 2014 | 14:00 | Elimination round of 32 |
| Saturday, 20 September 2014 | 14:00 | Elimination round of 16 |
| Saturday, 20 September 2014 | 14:00 | Quarterfinals |
| Saturday, 20 September 2014 | 14:00 | Semifinals |
| Saturday, 20 September 2014 | 14:00 | Final of repechage |
| Saturday, 20 September 2014 | 19:00 | Finals |

== Results ==
=== Main bracket ===
==== Final ====
| Gold medal contest |
| Ganbatyn Boldbaatar (MGL) | 000 |
| Yeldos Smetov (KAZ) | 101 |

==== Top half ====
Elimination round of 32
Navjot Chana (IND) | 100
Abdullah Al-Maraghi (KUW) | 000
He Yunlong (CHN) | 000
Ali Khousrof (YEM) | 000
Soukphaxay Sithisane (LAO) | 100
Argen Bakytbek Uulu (KGZ) | 000
Kim Chung-hyok (PRK) | 100
Saroj Maharjan (NEP) | 000

Elimination round of 16
Ganbatyn Boldbaatar (MGL) | 110
Navjot Chana (IND) | 000
Damien Ziade (LIB) | 101
He Yunlong (CHN) | 001
Sharafuddin Lutfillaev (UZB) | 110
Soukphaxay Sithisane (LAO) | 000
Tsai Ming-yen (TPE) | 100
Kim Chung-hyok (PRK) | 000

Quarterfinals
Ganbatyn Boldbaatar (MGL) | 011
Damien Ziade (LIB) | 000
Sharafuddin Lutfillaev (UZB) | 001
Tsai Ming-yen (TPE) | 100

Semifinals
Ganbatyn Boldbaatar (MGL) | 100
Tsai Ming-yen (TPE) | 000

==== Bottom half ====
Elimination round of 32
Mohammed Sarhan (PLE) | 000
Kabatullo Aminov (TJK) | 110
Abdul Fahim Fazli (AFG) | 100
Lei Tin Chi (MAC) | 010
Ehsan Bahramian (IRI) | 001
Begli Meretgeldiýew (TKM) | 000
Ghaith Al-Salman (JOR) | 000
Eisa Majrashi (KSA) | 100

Elimination round of 16
Yeldos Smetov (KAZ) | 111
Kabatullo Aminov (TJK) | 000
Yu Kin Ting (HKG) | 100
Abdul Fahim Fazli (AFG) | 000
Kim Won-jin (KOR) | 100
Ehsan Bahramian (IRI) | 000
Toru Shishime (JPN) | 110
Eisa Majrashi (KSA) | 000

Quarterfinals
Yeldos Smetov (KAZ) | 110
Yu Kin Ting (HKG) | 000
Kim Won-jin (KOR) | 000
Toru Shishime (JPN) | 010

Semifinals
Yeldos Smetov (KAZ) | 000
Toru Shishime (JPN) | 000

=== Repechage ===
Final of repechage
Damien Ziade (LIB) | 011
Sharafuddin Lutfillaev (UZB) | 101
Yu Kin Ting (HKG) | 000
Kim Won-jin (KOR) | 100

Bronze medal contests
Sharafuddin Lutfillaev (UZB) | 000
Toru Shishime (JPN) | 002
Kim Won-jin (KOR) | 010
Tsai Ming-yen (TPE) | 000
