= Judo at the 2016 Summer Olympics – Men's 60 kg =

Judo competition

Men's 60 kg at the Games of the XXXI Olympiad
- Venue: Carioca Arena 2
- Date: 6 August 2016
- Competitors: 35 from 35 nations

Medalists
1st place, gold medalist(s)		Beslan Mudranov	Russia
2nd place, silver medalist(s)		Yeldos Smetov	Kazakhstan
3rd place, bronze medalist(s)		Naohisa Takato	Japan
3rd place, bronze medalist(s)		Diyorbek Urozboev	Uzbekistan

The men's 60 kg competition in judo at the 2016 Summer Olympics in Rio de Janeiro was held on 6 August at the Carioca Arena 2.

The gold and silver medals were determined by a single-elimination tournament, with the winner of the final taking gold and the loser receiving silver. Judo events awarded two bronze medals. Quarterfinal losers competed in a repechage match for the right to face a semifinal loser for a bronze medal (that is, the judokas defeated in quarterfinals A and B competed against each other, with the winner of that match facing the semifinal loser from the other half of the bracket).

The medals for the competition were presented by Paul Tergat, Kenya, member of the International Olympic Committee and the gifts were presented by Manuel Larrañaga, vice president of the International Judo Federation.

== Results ==
=== Finals ===
Semi-finals
Beslan Mudranov (RUS)	100
Amiran Papinashvili (GEO)	000
Orkhan Safarov (AZE)	000
Yeldos Smetov (KAZ)	010

Final
Beslan Mudranov (RUS)	010
Yeldos Smetov (KAZ)	000

=== Repechages ===
Repechage		Bronze medal
Kim Won-jin (KOR)	000
Naohisa Takato (JPN)	001	Naohisa Takato (JPN)	000
		Orkhan Safarov (AZE)	000

Repechage		Bronze medal
Felipe Kitadai (BRA)	000
Diyorbek Urozboev (UZB)	100	Diyorbek Urozboev (UZB)	001
		Amiran Papinashvili (GEO)	000

=== Pool A ===
First round
José Ramos (GUA)	000
Tsogtbaataryn Tsend-Ochir (MGL)	100

Second round
Kim Won-jin (KOR)	001
Elios Manzi (ITA)	000
Tsogtbaataryn Tsend-Ochir (MGL)	011
Juho Reinvall (FIN)	000
Beslan Mudranov (RUS)	002
Jeroen Mooren (NED)	000
Ludwig Paischer (AUT)	000
Hovhannes Davtyan (ARM)	100

Third round
Kim Won-jin (KOR)	010
Tsogtbaataryn Tsend-Ochir (MGL)	001
Beslan Mudranov (RUS)	001
Hovhannes Davtyan (ARM)	000

Quarterfinals
Kim Won-jin (KOR)	000
Beslan Mudranov (RUS)	100

=== Pool B ===
First round
Tsai Ming-yen (TPE)	111
Soukphaxay Sithisane (LAO)	000

Second round
Naohisa Takato (JPN)	101
Yann Siccardi (MON)	000
Pavel Petřikov (CZE)	110
Gavin Mogopa (BOT)	000
Amiran Papinashvili (GEO)	011
Sérgio Pessoa (CAN)	000
Tsai Ming-yen (TPE)	000
Yanislav Gerchev (BUL)	110

Third round
Naohisa Takato (JPN)	100
Pavel Petřikov (CZE)	000
Amiran Papinashvili (GEO)	100
Yanislav Gerchev (BUL)	000

Quarterfinals
Naohisa Takato (JPN)	000
Amiran Papinashvili (GEO)	100

=== Pool C ===
First round
Simon Yacoub (PLE)	000
Walide Khyar (FRA)	100

Second round
Orkhan Safarov (AZE)	011
Juan Postigos (PER)	000
Ahmed Abelrahman (EGY)	000
Otar Bestaev (KGZ)	101
Felipe Kitadai (BRA)	001
Walide Khyar (FRA)	000
Francisco Garrigós (ESP)	000
Tobias Englmaier (GER)	001

Third round
Orkhan Safarov (AZE)	110
Otar Bestaev (KGZ)	001
Felipe Kitadai (BRA)	001
Tobias Englmaier (GER)	000

Quarterfinals
Orkhan Safarov (AZE)	100
Felipe Kitadai (BRA)	000

=== Pool D ===
First round

Second round
Yeldos Smetov (KAZ)	100
Mohamed El-Kawisah (LBA)	000
Ashley McKenzie (GBR)	003
Bekir Özlü (TUR)	000
Diyorbek Urozboev (UZB)	100
Joshua Katz (AUS)	000
Lenin Preciado (ECU)	002
Ludovic Chammartin (SUI)	010

Third round
Yeldos Smetov (KAZ)	001
Ashley McKenzie (GBR)	000
Diyorbek Urozboev (UZB)	011
Ludovic Chammartin (SUI)	000

Quarterfinals
Yeldos Smetov (KAZ)	001
Diyorbek Urozboev (UZB)	000
