= Rustam Ibrayev =

Kazakhstani judoka (born 1991)

Personal information
- Born: 29 May 1991 (age 35)
- Occupation: Judoka
- Height: 168 cm (5 ft 6 in)

Sport
- Country: Kazakhstan
- Sport: Judo
- Weight class: ‍–‍60 kg

Achievements and titles
- World Champ.: (silver) (2015)
- Asian Champ.: 5th (2016)
Medal record
Men's judo
Representing Kazakhstan
World Championships
Silver medal – second place	2015 Astana	‍–‍60 kg
IJF Grand Slam
Gold medal – first place	2015 Baku	‍–‍60 kg
Bronze medal – third place	2014 Tokyo	‍–‍60 kg
Bronze medal – third place	2015 Abu Dhabi	‍–‍60 kg
IJF Grand Prix
Silver medal – second place	2016 Almaty	‍–‍60 kg
Bronze medal – third place	2013 Almaty	‍–‍60 kg
Bronze medal – third place	2015 Düsseldorf	‍–‍60 kg
Summer Universiade
Bronze medal – third place	2017 Taipei	‍–‍60 kg

Profile at external databases
- IJF: 9099
- JudoInside.com: 80530
- Updated on 3 July 2023

Rustam Ibrayev (born 29 May 1991) is a Kazakhstani judoka.

Ibrayev won a silver medal at the 2015 World Judo Championships in Astana. He also won the 2015 Baku Grand Slam.
