= Soslan Bostanov =

Russian judoka (born 1983)

Personal information
- Nationality: Russian
- Born: 17 July 1983 (age 42)
- Occupation: Judoka

Sport
- Country: Russia
- Sport: Judo
- Weight class: +100 kg

Achievements and titles
- World Champ.: R16 (2010)
Medal record
Men's judo
Representing Russia
IJF Grand Slam
Silver medal – second place	2012 Moscow	+100 kg
Bronze medal – third place	2015 Tyumen	+100 kg
IJF Grand Prix
Gold medal – first place	2018 Tashkent	+100 kg
Silver medal – second place	2012 Baku	+100 kg
Bronze medal – third place	2013 Rijeka	+100 kg
Bronze medal – third place	2017 The Hague	+100 kg

Profile at external databases
- IJF: 1827
- JudoInside.com: 55603
- Updated on 24 November 2022

Soslan Bostanov (born 17 July 1983) is a Russian judoka.

He is the gold medallist of the 2018 Judo Grand Prix Tashkent in the +100 kg category.
