= 2015 Judo Grand Prix Düsseldorf =

Judo competition

Judo 2015 Judo Grand Prix Düsseldorf
- Venue: Mitsubishi Electric Halle
- Location: Düsseldorf, Germany
- Dates: 20–22 February 2015
- Competitors: 542 from 75 nations

Competition at external databases
- Links: IJF • EJU • JudoInside

The 2015 Judo Grand Prix Düsseldorf was held at the Mitsubishi Electric Halle in Düsseldorf, Germany from 20 to 22 February 2015.

== Medal summary ==
=== Men's events ===
Event	Gold	Silver	Bronze
Extra-lightweight (−60 kg)	Toru Shishime (JPN)	Kim Won-jin (KOR)	Rustam Ibrayev (KAZ)
Extra-lightweight (−60 kg)	Toru Shishime (JPN)	Kim Won-jin (KOR)	Phelipe Pelim (BRA)
Half-lightweight (−66 kg)	Kengo Takaichi (JPN)	Davaadorjiin Tömörkhüleg (MGL)	Vazha Margvelashvili (GEO)
Half-lightweight (−66 kg)	Kengo Takaichi (JPN)	Davaadorjiin Tömörkhüleg (MGL)	An Ba-ul (KOR)
Lightweight (−73 kg)	Shohei Ono (JPN)	Nugzar Tatalashvili (GEO)	Sagi Muki (ISR)
Lightweight (−73 kg)	Shohei Ono (JPN)	Nugzar Tatalashvili (GEO)	An Chang-rim (KOR)
Half-middleweight (−81 kg)	Joachim Bottieau (BEL)	Avtandili Tchrikishvili (GEO)	Loïc Pietri (FRA)
Half-middleweight (−81 kg)	Joachim Bottieau (BEL)	Avtandili Tchrikishvili (GEO)	Sven Maresch (GER)
Middleweight (−90 kg)	Varlam Liparteliani (GEO)	Kazbek Zankishiev (RUS)	Daiki Nishiyama (JPN)
Middleweight (−90 kg)	Varlam Liparteliani (GEO)	Kazbek Zankishiev (RUS)	Beka Gviniashvili (GEO)
Half-heavyweight (−100 kg)	Ryunosuke Haga (JPN)	Ramadan Darwish (EGY)	Cyrille Maret (FRA)
Half-heavyweight (−100 kg)	Ryunosuke Haga (JPN)	Ramadan Darwish (EGY)	Henk Grol (NED)
Heavyweight (+100 kg)	Ryu Shichinohe (JPN)	Takeshi Ōjitani (JPN)	Or Sasson (ISR)
Heavyweight (+100 kg)	Ryu Shichinohe (JPN)	Takeshi Ōjitani (JPN)	Sven Heinle (GER)

=== Women's events ===
Event	Gold	Silver	Bronze
Extra-lightweight (−48 kg)	Charline Van Snick (BEL)	Mönkhbatyn Urantsetseg (MGL)	Haruna Asami (JPN)
Extra-lightweight (−48 kg)	Charline Van Snick (BEL)	Mönkhbatyn Urantsetseg (MGL)	Jeong Bo-kyeong (KOR)
Half-lightweight (−52 kg)	Ma Yingnan (CHN)	Misato Nakamura (JPN)	Andreea Chițu (ROU)
Half-lightweight (−52 kg)	Ma Yingnan (CHN)	Misato Nakamura (JPN)	Mareen Kräh (GER)
Lightweight (−57 kg)	Rafaela Silva (BRA)	Dorjsürengiin Sumiyaa (MGL)	Automne Pavia (FRA)
Lightweight (−57 kg)	Rafaela Silva (BRA)	Dorjsürengiin Sumiyaa (MGL)	Hedvig Karakas (HUN)
Half-middleweight (−63 kg)	Alice Schlesinger (GBR)	Tsedevsürengiin Mönkhzayaa (MGL)	Martyna Trajdos (GER)
Half-middleweight (−63 kg)	Alice Schlesinger (GBR)	Tsedevsürengiin Mönkhzayaa (MGL)	Miku Takaichi (JPN)
Middleweight (−70 kg)	Chizuru Arai (JPN)	Szaundra Diedrich (GER)	Sanne van Dijke (NED)
Middleweight (−70 kg)	Chizuru Arai (JPN)	Szaundra Diedrich (GER)	Kelita Zupancic (CAN)
Half-heavyweight (−78 kg)	Kayla Harrison (USA)	Anamari Velenšek (SLO)	Abigél Joó (HUN)
Half-heavyweight (−78 kg)	Kayla Harrison (USA)	Anamari Velenšek (SLO)	Ruika Sato (JPN)
Heavyweight (+78 kg)	Kanae Yamabe (JPN)	Nihel Cheikh Rouhou (TUN)	Carolin Weiß (GER)
Heavyweight (+78 kg)	Kanae Yamabe (JPN)	Nihel Cheikh Rouhou (TUN)	Franziska Konitz (GER)

Source Results

=== Medal table ===
* Host nation (Germany)

Rank	Nation	Gold	Silver	Bronze	Total
1	Japan (JPN)	7	2	4	13
2	Belgium (BEL)	2	0	0	2
3	Georgia (GEO)	1	2	2	5
4	Brazil (BRA)	1	0	1	2
5	China (CHN)	1	0	0	1
5	Great Britain (GBR)	1	0	0	1
5	United States (USA)	1	0	0	1
8	Mongolia (MGL)	0	4	0	4
9	Germany (GER)*	0	1	6	7
10	South Korea (KOR)	0	1	3	4
11	Egypt (EGY)	0	1	0	1
11	Russia (RUS)	0	1	0	1
11	Slovenia (SLO)	0	1	0	1
11	Tunisia (TUN)	0	1	0	1
15	France (FRA)	0	0	3	3
16	Hungary (HUN)	0	0	2	2
16	Israel (ISR)	0	0	2	2
16	Netherlands (NED)	0	0	2	2
19	Canada (CAN)	0	0	1	1
19	Kazakhstan (KAZ)	0	0	1	1
19	Romania (ROU)	0	0	1	1
Totals (21 entries)		14	14	28	56
