= Judo at the 2011 Pan American Games – Men's 60 kg =

Men's 60 kg at the 2011 Pan American Games
- Venue: CODE II Gymnasium
- Dates: October 29
- Competitors: 10 from 10 nations

Medalists
Gold medal	Felipe Kitadai	Brazil
Silver medal	Nabor Castillo	Mexico
Bronze medal	Juan Postigos	Peru
Bronze medal	Aaron Kunihiro	United States

The men's 60 kg competition of the judo events at the 2011 Pan American Games in Guadalajara, Mexico, was held on October 29 at the CODE II Gymanasium. The defending champion was Miguel Albarracín of Argentina.

== Schedule ==
All times are Central Standard Time (UTC-6).

Date	Time	Round
October 29, 2011	11:00	Preliminaries
October 29, 2011	11:24	Quarterfinals
October 29, 2011	12:44	Repechage
October 29, 2011	13:08	Semifinals
October 29, 2011	17:48	Bronze medal matches
October 29, 2011	18:04	Final

== Results ==
Legend

- 1st number = Ippon
- 2nd number = Waza-ari
- 3rd number = Yuko

=== Bracket ===
Preliminaries
Antonio Betancourt (CUB)	000
Javier Guédez (VEN)	001
Nabor Castillo (MEX)	010
Jhon Futtinico (COL)	000

Quarter Finals
Felipe Kitadai (BRA)	100
Javier Guédez (VEN)	000
Jose Romero (ECU)	001
Aaron Kunihiro (USA)	110
Nabor Castillo (MEX)	010
Frazer Will (CAN)	001
Juan Postigos (PER)	100
Kenny Godoy (HON)	000

Semi Finals
Felipe Kitadai (BRA)	100
Aaron Kunihiro (USA)	000
Nabor Castillo (MEX)	001
Juan Postigos (PER)	000

Final
Felipe Kitadai (BRA)	101
Nabor Castillo (MEX)	001

=== Repechage round ===
Two bronze medals were awarded.

First round
Bye
Javier Guédez (VEN)	000
Bye
Jose Romero (ECU)
Jhon Futtinico (COL)	011
Frazer Will (CAN)	100
Bye
Kenny Godoy (HON)

Semifinals
Javier Guédez (VEN)	000
Jose Romero (ECU)	001
Frazer Will (CAN)	100
Kenny Godoy (HON)	000

Finals
Juan Postigos (PER)	100
Jose Romero (ECU)	001
Aaron Kunihiro (USA)	003
Frazer Will (CAN)	000
