= 2011 World Judo Juniors Championships =

Judo competition

Judo 2011 World Judo Juniors Championships
- Location: Cape Town, South Africa
- Dates: 3–6 November 2011
- Competitors: 567 from 75 nations

Competition at external databases
- Links: IJF • EJU • JudoInside

The 2011 World Judo Juniors Championships was an edition of the World Judo Juniors Championships, organised by the International Judo Federation. It was held in Cape Town, South Africa from 3 to 6 November 2011.

== Medal summary ==
=== Men's events ===
| Event | Gold | Silver | Bronze |
|---|---|---|---|
| −55 kg | Sakhavat Gadzhiev (RUS) | Seriktay Zaketayev (KAZ) | Gert Maes (BEL) |
| −55 kg | Sakhavat Gadzhiev (RUS) | Seriktay Zaketayev (KAZ) | Giorgi Mesablishvili (GEO) |
| −60 kg | Naohisa Takato (JPN) | An Ba-ul (KOR) | Allan Kuwabara (BRA) |
| −60 kg | Naohisa Takato (JPN) | An Ba-ul (KOR) | Yeldos Smetov (KAZ) |
| −66 kg | Sho Tateyama (JPN) | Magomed Akhmarov (RUS) | Lee Dong-kyo (KOR) |
| −66 kg | Sho Tateyama (JPN) | Magomed Akhmarov (RUS) | Lasha Shavdatuashvili (GEO) |
| −73 kg | Shohei Ono (JPN) | Aziz Kalkamanuly (KAZ) | Vladimir Zoloev (RUS) |
| −73 kg | Shohei Ono (JPN) | Aziz Kalkamanuly (KAZ) | Jung Hae-joo (KOR) |
| −81 kg | Goki Maruyama (JPN) | Albert Kostoev (RUS) | Beka Gviniashvili (GEO) |
| −81 kg | Goki Maruyama (JPN) | Albert Kostoev (RUS) | Khavambay Khovdal (KAZ) |
| −90 kg | Kazbek Zankishiev (RUS) | Khusen Khalmurzaev (RUS) | Benjamin Fletcher (GBR) |
| −90 kg | Kazbek Zankishiev (RUS) | Khusen Khalmurzaev (RUS) | Stanislav Retinskii (UKR) |
| −100 kg | José Armenteros (CUB) | Domenico Di Guida (ITA) | Takumi Asanuma (JPN) |
| −100 kg | José Armenteros (CUB) | Domenico Di Guida (ITA) | Ali Erdogan (RUS) |
| +100 kg | Takeshi Ōjitani (JPN) | Cho Gu-ham (KOR) | Sven Heinle (GER) |
| +100 kg | Takeshi Ōjitani (JPN) | Cho Gu-ham (KOR) | Anton Krivobokov (RUS) |

=== Women's events ===
| Event | Gold | Silver | Bronze |
|---|---|---|---|
| −44 kg | Sakiho Hamada (JPN) | Agueda Silva (BRA) | Cristina Casas (ESP) |
| −44 kg | Sakiho Hamada (JPN) | Agueda Silva (BRA) | Hayley Willis (GBR) |
| −48 kg | Hiromi Endō (JPN) | Alesya Kuznetsova (RUS) | Choi Soo-hee (KOR) |
| −48 kg | Hiromi Endō (JPN) | Alesya Kuznetsova (RUS) | Mélanie Clément (FRA) |
| −52 kg | Takumi Miyakawa (JPN) | Oleksandra Starkova (UKR) | Cheyenne Bienz (SUI) |
| −52 kg | Takumi Miyakawa (JPN) | Oleksandra Starkova (UKR) | Floortje Stoop (NED) |
| −57 kg | Anzu Yamamoto (JPN) | Sanne Verhagen (NED) | Fabienne Kocher (SUI) |
| −57 kg | Anzu Yamamoto (JPN) | Sanne Verhagen (NED) | Tina Zeltner (AUT) |
| −63 kg | Haruna Ota (JPN) | Halima Mohamed-Seghir (POL) | Clarisse Agbegnenou (FRA) |
| −63 kg | Haruna Ota (JPN) | Halima Mohamed-Seghir (POL) | Kateryna Lyalina (UKR) |
| −70 kg | Bernadette Graf (AUT) | Naranjargal Tsend-Ayush (MGL) | Chen Rong (CHN) |
| −70 kg | Bernadette Graf (AUT) | Naranjargal Tsend-Ayush (MGL) | Lisa Schneider (GER) |
| −78 kg | Mami Umeki (JPN) | Yoon Hyun-ji (KOR) | Guusje Steenhuis (NED) |
| −78 kg | Mami Umeki (JPN) | Yoon Hyun-ji (KOR) | Julia Tillmanns (GER) |
| +78 kg | Manami Inoue (JPN) | Carolin Weiß (GER) | Ara Jo (KOR) |
| +78 kg | Manami Inoue (JPN) | Carolin Weiß (GER) | Tessie Savelkouls (NED) |

Source Results

=== Medal table ===
* Host nation (South Africa)

| Rank | Nation | Gold | Silver | Bronze | Total |
|---|---|---|---|---|---|
| 1 | Japan (JPN) | 12 | 0 | 1 | 13 |
| 2 | Russia (RUS) | 2 | 4 | 3 | 9 |
| 3 | Austria (AUT) | 1 | 0 | 1 | 2 |
| 4 | Cuba (CUB) | 1 | 0 | 0 | 1 |
| 5 | South Korea (KOR) | 0 | 3 | 4 | 7 |
| 6 | Kazakhstan (KAZ) | 0 | 2 | 2 | 4 |
| 7 | Germany (GER) | 0 | 1 | 3 | 4 |
| 7 | Netherlands (NED) | 0 | 1 | 3 | 4 |
| 9 | Ukraine (UKR) | 0 | 1 | 2 | 3 |
| 10 | Brazil (BRA) | 0 | 1 | 1 | 2 |
| 11 | Italy (ITA) | 0 | 1 | 0 | 1 |
| 11 | Mongolia (MGL) | 0 | 1 | 0 | 1 |
| 11 | Poland (POL) | 0 | 1 | 0 | 1 |
| 14 | Georgia (GEO) | 0 | 0 | 3 | 3 |
| 15 | France (FRA) | 0 | 0 | 2 | 2 |
| 15 | Great Britain (GBR) | 0 | 0 | 2 | 2 |
| 15 | Switzerland (SUI) | 0 | 0 | 2 | 2 |
| 18 | Belgium (BEL) | 0 | 0 | 1 | 1 |
| 18 | China (CHN) | 0 | 0 | 1 | 1 |
| 18 | Spain (ESP) | 0 | 0 | 1 | 1 |
| Totals (20 entries) | | 16 | 16 | 32 | 64 |
