= Mohamed El-Kawisah =

Libyan judoka (born 1987)

Personal information
- Born: 8 March 1987 (age 39)
- Occupation: Judoka

Sport
- Country: Libya
- Sport: Judo
- Weight class: ‍–‍60 kg, ‍–‍73 kg

Achievements and titles
- Olympic Games: R32 (2016)
- World Champ.: R32 (2015)
- African Champ.: (gold) (2011)
Medal record
Men's judo
Representing Libya
African Games
Bronze medal – third place	2011 Maputo	‍–‍60 kg
African Championships
Gold medal – first place	2011 Dakar	‍–‍60 kg
Silver medal – second place	2009 Mauritius	‍–‍60 kg
Silver medal – second place	2015 Libreville	‍–‍60 kg
Bronze medal – third place	2013 Maputo	‍–‍60 kg
Bronze medal – third place	2016 Tunis	‍–‍60 kg
IJF Grand Prix
Bronze medal – third place	2012 Baku	‍–‍60 kg

Profile at external databases
- IJF: 3049
- JudoInside.com: 47307
- Updated on 29 December 2022

Mohamed El-Kawisah (born 8 March 1987) is a Libyan judoka. He competed at the 2016 Summer Olympics in the men's 60 kg event, in which he received a bye in the first round and was eliminated in the second round by Yeldos Smetov.
