= Takeshi Ōjitani =

Japanese judoka (born 1992)

Personal information
- Nationality: Japanese
- Born: 9 June 1992 (age 34)
- Occupation: Judoka

Sport
- Country: Japan
- Sport: Judo
- Weight class: +100 kg

Achievements and titles
- World Champ.: (bronze) (2017)
- Asian Champ.: (gold) (2014)
Medal record
Men's judo
Representing Japan
World Championships
Bronze medal – third place	2017 Marrakesh	Open
Asian Games
Gold medal – first place	2014 Incheon	+100 kg
Bronze medal – third place	2014 Incheon	Men's team
Asian Championships
Silver medal – second place	2012 Tashkent	+100 kg
IJF Grand Slam
Gold medal – first place	2016 Tokyo	+100 kg
Gold medal – first place	2017 Paris	+100 kg
Silver medal – second place	2014 Tyumen	+100 kg
Silver medal – second place	2018 Düsseldorf	+100 kg
Bronze medal – third place	2014 Tokyo	+100 kg
Bronze medal – third place	2015 Paris	+100 kg
Bronze medal – third place	2016 Tyumen	+100 kg
IJF Grand Prix
Gold medal – first place	2015 Budapest	+100 kg
Silver medal – second place	2015 Düsseldorf	+100 kg
World Juniors Championships
Gold medal – first place	2010 Agadir	+100 kg
Gold medal – first place	2011 Cape Town	+100 kg
Summer Universiade
Gold medal – first place	2011 Shenzhen	Men's team
Gold medal – first place	2013 Kazan	Men's team
Bronze medal – third place	2011 Shenzhen	+100 kg

Profile at external databases
- IJF: 11100
- JudoInside.com: 71929
- Updated on 26 June 2023

Takeshi Ōjitani (born 9 June 1992) is a Japanese judoka.

== Career ==
He is the gold medallist of the 2016 Judo Grand Slam Tokyo in the +100 kg category.
