= 2012 Judo Grand Prix Baku =

Judo competition

Judo 2012 Judo Grand Prix Baku
- Location: Baku, Azerbaijan
- Dates: 5–6 May 2012
- Competitors: 92 from 15 nations

Competition at external databases
- Links: IJF • JudoInside

The 2012 Judo Grand Prix Baku was held in Baku, Azerbaijan from 5 to 6 May 2012.

== Medal summary ==
=== Men's events ===
Event	Gold	Silver	Bronze
Extra-lightweight (−60 kg)	Ilgar Mushkiyev (AZE)	Giorgi Mesablishvili (GEO)	Mohamed El-Kawisah (LBA)
Extra-lightweight (−60 kg)	Ilgar Mushkiyev (AZE)	Giorgi Mesablishvili (GEO)	Orkhan Safarov (AZE)
Half-lightweight (−66 kg)	Masashi Kodera (JPN)	Mikhail Pulyaev (RUS)	Tarlan Karimov (AZE)
Half-lightweight (−66 kg)	Masashi Kodera (JPN)	Mikhail Pulyaev (RUS)	Nijat Shikhalizada (AZE)
Lightweight (−73 kg)	Rustam Orujov (AZE)	Mirali Sharipov (UZB)	Zebeda Rekhviashvili (GEO)
Lightweight (−73 kg)	Rustam Orujov (AZE)	Mirali Sharipov (UZB)	Hasan Yilmaz (TUR)
Half-middleweight (−81 kg)	Tural Safguliyev (AZE)	Vitalii Popovych (UKR)	Mammadali Mehdiyev (AZE)
Half-middleweight (−81 kg)	Tural Safguliyev (AZE)	Vitalii Popovych (UKR)	Lasha Zurabiani (GEO)
Middleweight (−90 kg)	Yuri Panasenkov (RUS)	Ramin Gurbanov (AZE)	Zviad Gogotchuri (GEO)
Middleweight (−90 kg)	Yuri Panasenkov (RUS)	Ramin Gurbanov (AZE)	Sherali Juraev (UZB)
Half-heavyweight (−100 kg)	Elkhan Mammadov (AZE)	Beka Berdzenishvili (GEO)	Dmytro Luchyn (UKR)
Half-heavyweight (−100 kg)	Elkhan Mammadov (AZE)	Beka Berdzenishvili (GEO)	Aleksandre Mskhaladze (GEO)
Heavyweight (+100 kg)	Masaru Momose (JPN)	Soslan Bostanov (RUS)	Andrey Fatiyev (AZE)

=== Women's events ===
Event	Gold	Silver	Bronze
Extra-lightweight (−48 kg)	Ebru Şahin (TUR)	Vafa Eyvazova (AZE)	—
Half-lightweight (−52 kg)	Nodoka Tanimoto (JPN)	Gulshan Nazarova (AZE)	Turana Seyidi (AZE)
Lightweight (−57 kg)	Kifayat Gasimova (AZE)	Joliane Melançon (CAN)	Andrea Bekic (CRO)
Lightweight (−57 kg)	Kifayat Gasimova (AZE)	Joliane Melançon (CAN)	Kudret Egilmez (TUR)
Half-middleweight (−63 kg)	Haruka Yasumatsu (JPN)	Ramila Yusubova (AZE)	Gemma Howell (GBR)
Middleweight (−70 kg)	Raša Sraka (SLO)	Kristina Marijanovic (CRO)	Gyunai Alimamedli (AZE)
Middleweight (−70 kg)	Raša Sraka (SLO)	Kristina Marijanovic (CRO)	Gulnoza Matniyazova (UZB)
Half-heavyweight (−78 kg)	Dursadaf Karimova (AZE)	Farida Gurbanova (AZE)	—
Heavyweight (+78 kg)	Irine Leonidze (GEO)	Ivana Maranić (CRO)	Gulnara Asadova (AZE)

Source Results

=== Medal table ===
* Host nation (Azerbaijan)

Rank	Nation	Gold	Silver	Bronze	Total
1	Azerbaijan (AZE)*	6	5	8	19
2	Japan (JPN)	4	0	0	4
3	Georgia (GEO)	1	2	4	7
4	Russia (RUS)	1	2	0	3
5	Turkey (TUR)	1	0	2	3
6	Slovenia (SLO)	1	0	0	1
7	Croatia (CRO)	0	2	1	3
8	Uzbekistan (UZB)	0	1	2	3
9	Ukraine (UKR)	0	1	1	2
10	Canada (CAN)	0	1	0	1
11	Great Britain (GBR)	0	0	1	1
11	Libya (LBA)	0	0	1	1
Totals (12 entries)		14	14	20	48
