= 2013 Judo World Masters =

Judo competition

Judo 2013 Judo World Masters
- Venue: Tyumen
- Location: Tyumen, Russia
- Dates: 25–26 May 2013
- Competitors: 199 from 41 nations

Competition at external databases
- Links: IJF • JudoInside

The 2013 Judo World Masters was held in Tyumen, Russia, from 25 to 26 May 2013.

== Medal summary ==
=== Medal table ===
* Host nation (Russia)

Rank	Nation	Gold	Silver	Bronze	Total
1	Japan (JPN)	3	2	2	7
2	Mongolia (MGL)	2	2	1	5
3	Brazil (BRA)	1	3	2	6
4	Netherlands (NED)	1	2	2	5
5	Russia (RUS)*	1	1	1	3
6	Georgia (GEO)	1	0	3	4
7	Azerbaijan (AZE)	1	0	1	2
8	China (CHN)	1	0	0	1
8	Greece (GRE)	1	0	0	1
8	Kazakhstan (KAZ)	1	0	0	1
8	Kosovo (KOS)	1	0	0	1
12	France (FRA)	0	1	4	5
13	Israel (ISR)	0	1	1	2
14	Canada (CAN)	0	1	0	1
14	Hungary (HUN)	0	1	0	1
16	Cuba (CUB)	0	0	3	3
17	Romania (ROU)	0	0	2	2
17	South Korea (KOR)	0	0	2	2
19	Germany (GER)	0	0	1	1
19	Portugal (POR)	0	0	1	1
19	Slovenia (SLO)	0	0	1	1
19	Uzbekistan (UZB)	0	0	1	1
Totals (22 entries)		14	14	28	56

=== Men's events ===
Event	Gold	Silver	Bronze
Extra-lightweight (-60 kg)	Naohisa Takato; Japan	Boldbaatar Ganbat; Mongolia	Felipe Kitadai; Brazil
Extra-lightweight (-60 kg)	Naohisa Takato; Japan	Boldbaatar Ganbat; Mongolia	Amiran Papinashvili; Georgia
Half-lightweight (-66 kg)	Sergey Lim; Kazakhstan	Tomofumi Takajo; Japan	David Larose; France
Half-lightweight (-66 kg)	Sergey Lim; Kazakhstan	Tomofumi Takajo; Japan	Golan Pollack; Israel
Lightweight (-73 kg)	Sainjargalyn Nyam-Ochir; Mongolia	Dex Elmont; Netherlands	Mirali Sharipov; Uzbekistan
Lightweight (-73 kg)	Sainjargalyn Nyam-Ochir; Mongolia	Dex Elmont; Netherlands	Khashbaataryn Tsagaanbaatar; Mongolia
Half-middleweight (-81 kg)	Ivan Nifontov; Russia	Keita Nagashima; Japan	Victor Penalber; Brazil
Half-middleweight (-81 kg)	Ivan Nifontov; Russia	Keita Nagashima; Japan	Avtandil Tchrikishvili; Georgia
Middleweight (-90 kg)	Ilias Iliadis; Greece	Kirill Denisov; Russia	Asley González; Cuba
Middleweight (-90 kg)	Ilias Iliadis; Greece	Kirill Denisov; Russia	Varlam Liparteliani; Georgia
Half-heavyweight (-100 kg)	Elkhan Mammadov; Azerbaijan	Henk Grol; Netherlands	Elmar Gasimov; Azerbaijan
Half-heavyweight (-100 kg)	Elkhan Mammadov; Azerbaijan	Henk Grol; Netherlands	Cyrille Maret; France
Heavyweight (+100 kg)	Adam Okruashvili; Georgia	Rafael Silva; Brazil	Renat Saidov; Russia
Heavyweight (+100 kg)	Adam Okruashvili; Georgia	Rafael Silva; Brazil	Andreas Tölzer; Germany

=== Women's events ===
Event	Gold	Silver	Bronze
Extra-lightweight (-48 kg)	Hiromi Endō; Japan	Sarah Menezes; Brazil	Dayaris Mestre Álvarez; Cuba
Extra-lightweight (-48 kg)	Hiromi Endō; Japan	Sarah Menezes; Brazil	Riho Okamoto; Japan
Half-lightweight (-52 kg)	Majlinda Kelmendi; Kosovo	Tsolmon Adiyasambuu; Mongolia	Takumi Miyakawa; Japan
Half-lightweight (-52 kg)	Majlinda Kelmendi; Kosovo	Tsolmon Adiyasambuu; Mongolia	Andreea Chițu; Romania
Lightweight (-57 kg)	Sumiya Dorjsuren; Mongolia	Automne Pavia; France	Telma Monteiro; Portugal
Lightweight (-57 kg)	Sumiya Dorjsuren; Mongolia	Automne Pavia; France	Corina Căprioriu; Romania
Half-middleweight (-63 kg)	Kana Abe; Japan	Yarden Gerbi; Israel	Anicka van Emden; Netherlands
Half-middleweight (-63 kg)	Kana Abe; Japan	Yarden Gerbi; Israel	Joung Da-woon; South Korea
Middleweight (-70 kg)	Kim Polling; Netherlands	Kelita Zupancic; Canada	Lucie Décosse; France
Middleweight (-70 kg)	Kim Polling; Netherlands	Kelita Zupancic; Canada	Linda Bolder; Netherlands
Half-heavyweight (-78 kg)	Mayra Aguiar; Brazil	Abigél Joó; Hungary	Audrey Tcheuméo; France
Half-heavyweight (-78 kg)	Mayra Aguiar; Brazil	Abigél Joó; Hungary	Jeong Gyeong-mi; South Korea
Heavyweight (+78 kg)	Yu Song; China	Maria Suelen Altheman; Brazil	Idalys Ortiz; Cuba
Heavyweight (+78 kg)	Yu Song; China	Maria Suelen Altheman; Brazil	Lucija Polavder; Slovenia
