= 2015 Judo Grand Slam Abu Dhabi =

Judo competition

Judo 2015 Judo Grand Slam Abu Dhabi
- Venue: IPIC Arena, Abu Dhabi
- Location: Abu Dhabi, United Arab Emirates
- Dates: 30 October – 1 November 2015
- Competitors: 481 from 88 nations

Competition at external databases
- Links: IJF • EJU • JudoInside

The 2015 Judo Grand Slam was held in Abu Dhabi, United Arab Emirates, from 30 October–1 November 2015.

== Medal summary ==
=== Men's events ===
Event	Gold	Silver	Bronze
Extra-lightweight (−60 kg)	Amiran Papinashvili (GEO)	Tsend-Ochiryn Tsogtbaatar (MGL)	Diyorbek Urozboev (UZB)
Extra-lightweight (−60 kg)	Amiran Papinashvili (GEO)	Tsend-Ochiryn Tsogtbaatar (MGL)	Rustam Ibrayev (KAZ)
Half-lightweight (−66 kg)	An Ba-ul (KOR)	Arsen Galstyan (RUS)	Georgii Zantaraia (UKR)
Half-lightweight (−66 kg)	An Ba-ul (KOR)	Arsen Galstyan (RUS)	Rishod Sobirov (UZB)
Lightweight (−73 kg)	An Chang-rim (KOR)	Igor Wandtke (GER)	Sagi Muki (ISR)
Lightweight (−73 kg)	An Chang-rim (KOR)	Igor Wandtke (GER)	Lasha Shavdatuashvili (GEO)
Half-middleweight (−81 kg)	Ivaylo Ivanov (BUL)	Sergiu Toma (UAE)	László Csoknyai (HUN)
Half-middleweight (−81 kg)	Ivaylo Ivanov (BUL)	Sergiu Toma (UAE)	Sirazhudin Magomedov (RUS)
Middleweight (−90 kg)	Lkhagvasürengiin Otgonbaatar (MGL)	Noël van 't End (NED)	Krisztián Tóth (HUN)
Middleweight (−90 kg)	Lkhagvasürengiin Otgonbaatar (MGL)	Noël van 't End (NED)	Marcus Nyman (SWE)
Half-heavyweight (−100 kg)	Tagir Khaybulaev (RUS)	Lukáš Krpálek (CZE)	Karl-Richard Frey (GER)
Half-heavyweight (−100 kg)	Tagir Khaybulaev (RUS)	Lukáš Krpálek (CZE)	Toma Nikiforov (BEL)
Heavyweight (+100 kg)	Kim Sung-min (KOR)	Iakiv Khammo (UKR)	André Breitbarth (GER)
Heavyweight (+100 kg)	Kim Sung-min (KOR)	Iakiv Khammo (UKR)	Faïcel Jaballah (TUN)

=== Women's events ===
Event	Gold	Silver	Bronze
Extra-lightweight (−48 kg)	Irina Dolgova (RUS)	Ebru Şahin (TUR)	Dilara Lokmanhekim (TUR)
Extra-lightweight (−48 kg)	Irina Dolgova (RUS)	Ebru Şahin (TUR)	Shishi Xie (CHN)
Half-lightweight (−52 kg)	Annabelle Euranie (FRA)	Érika Miranda (BRA)	Priscilla Gneto (FRA)
Half-lightweight (−52 kg)	Annabelle Euranie (FRA)	Érika Miranda (BRA)	Majlinda Kelmendi (KOS)
Lightweight (−57 kg)	Kim Jan-di (KOR)	Lien Chen-ling (TPE)	Viola Wächter (GER)
Lightweight (−57 kg)	Kim Jan-di (KOR)	Lien Chen-ling (TPE)	Loredana Ohai (ROU)
Half-middleweight (−63 kg)	Clarisse Agbegnenou (FRA)	Martyna Trajdos (GER)	Yarden Gerbi (ISR)
Half-middleweight (−63 kg)	Clarisse Agbegnenou (FRA)	Martyna Trajdos (GER)	Anicka van Emden (NED)
Middleweight (−70 kg)	Laura Vargas Koch (GER)	Kim Polling (NED)	Chizuru Arai (JPN)
Middleweight (−70 kg)	Laura Vargas Koch (GER)	Kim Polling (NED)	Katarzyna Kłys (POL)
Half-heavyweight (−78 kg)	Marhinde Verkerk (NED)	Mayra Aguiar (BRA)	Guusje Steenhuis (NED)
Half-heavyweight (−78 kg)	Marhinde Verkerk (NED)	Mayra Aguiar (BRA)	Abigél Joó (HUN)
Heavyweight (+78 kg)	Ma Sisi (CHN)	Tessie Savelkouls (NED)	Yu Song (CHN)
Heavyweight (+78 kg)	Ma Sisi (CHN)	Tessie Savelkouls (NED)	Émilie Andéol (FRA)

Source Results

=== Medal table ===
* Host nation (United Arab Emirates)

Rank	Nation	Gold	Silver	Bronze	Total
1	South Korea (KOR)	4	0	0	4
2	Russia (RUS)	2	1	1	4
3	France (FRA)	2	0	2	4
4	Netherlands (NED)	1	3	2	6
5	Germany (GER)	1	2	3	6
6	Mongolia (MGL)	1	1	0	2
7	China (CHN)	1	0	2	3
8	Georgia (GEO)	1	0	1	2
9	Bulgaria (BUL)	1	0	0	1
10	Brazil (BRA)	0	2	0	2
11	Turkey (TUR)	0	1	1	2
11	Ukraine (UKR)	0	1	1	2
13	Chinese Taipei (TPE)	0	1	0	1
13	Czech Republic (CZE)	0	1	0	1
13	United Arab Emirates (UAE)*	0	1	0	1
16	Hungary (HUN)	0	0	3	3
17	Israel (ISR)	0	0	2	2
17	Uzbekistan (UZB)	0	0	2	2
19	Belgium (BEL)	0	0	1	1
19	Japan (JPN)	0	0	1	1
19	Kazakhstan (KAZ)	0	0	1	1
19	Kosovo (KOS)	0	0	1	1
19	Poland (POL)	0	0	1	1
19	Romania (ROU)	0	0	1	1
19	Sweden (SWE)	0	0	1	1
19	Tunisia (TUN)	0	0	1	1
Totals (26 entries)		14	14	28	56
