= Ahmet Şahin Kaba =

Turkish judoka

Ahmet Sahin Kaba
Personal information
- Born: 27 August 1993 (age 32)
- Occupation: Judoka

Sport
- Country: Turkey
- Sport: Judo
- Weight class: ‍–‍60 kg

Achievements and titles
- World Champ.: R32 (2013, 2014)
- European Champ.: R16 (2017)
Medal record
Men's judo
Representing Turkey
IJF Grand Prix
Silver medal – second place	2014 Zagreb	‍–‍60 kg
Silver medal – second place	2016 Samsun	‍–‍60 kg
Bronze medal – third place	2017 Antalya	‍–‍60 kg
World Juniors Championships
Bronze medal – third place	2013 Ljubljana	‍–‍60 kg
European Junior Championships
Silver medal – second place	2013 Sarajevo	‍–‍60 kg
Bronze medal – third place	2012 Poreč	‍–‍60 kg
European Cadet Championships
Silver medal – second place	2009 Koper	‍–‍55 kg

Profile at external databases
- IJF: 2725
- JudoInside.com: 51106
- Updated on 7 December 2022

Ahmet Sahin Kaba (born 27 August 1993) is a Turkish judoka.

Kaba is a bronze medalist from the 2017 Judo Grand Prix Antalya in the ‍–‍60 kg category.
