= José Ramos (judoka) =

Guatemalan judoka (born 1994)

Personal information
- Full name: José Alfredo Ramos Dávila
- Born: 9 November 1994 (age 31) Cobán, Guatemala
- Occupation: Judoka

Sport
- Country: Guatemala
- Sport: Judo
- Weight class: ‍–‍60 kg

Achievements and titles
- Olympic Games: R32 (2020)
- World Champ.: R32 (2015, 2019, 2023)
- Pan American Champ.: 5th (2014, 2021)
Medal record
Men's judo
Representing Guatemala
Central American and Caribbean Games
Bronze medal – third place	2026 Santo Domingo	‍–‍60 kg

Profile at external databases
- IJF: 10865
- JudoInside.com: 86587
- Updated on 25 July 2026

José Alfredo Ramos Dávila (born 9 November 1994) is a judoka from Guatemala. He represented his country Guatemala at the 2016 Summer Olympics in the men's 60 kg event, losing to Tsend-Ochiryn Tsogtbaatar of Mongolia by ippon in the first round.

Ramos represented Guatemala at the 2020 Summer Olympics, competing in the men's 60 kg event.
