= 2013 Judo Grand Prix Almaty =

Judo competition

Judo 2013 Judo Grand Prix Almaty
- Location: Almaty, Kazakhstan
- Dates: 28–29 September 2013
- Competitors: 152 from 13 nations

Competition at external databases
- Links: IJF • JudoInside

The 2013 Judo Grand Prix Almaty was held in Almaty, Kazakhstan from 28 to 29 September 2013.

== Medal summary ==
=== Men's events ===
Event	Gold	Silver	Bronze
Extra-lightweight (−60 kg)	Yeldos Smetov (KAZ)	Aibek Imashev (KAZ)	Rustam Ibrayev (KAZ)
Extra-lightweight (−60 kg)	Yeldos Smetov (KAZ)	Aibek Imashev (KAZ)	Askhat Telmanov (KAZ)
Half-lightweight (−66 kg)	Yeldos Zhumakanov (KAZ)	Dzmitry Shershan (BLR)	Bakdaulet Sabitov (KAZ)
Half-lightweight (−66 kg)	Yeldos Zhumakanov (KAZ)	Dzmitry Shershan (BLR)	Yakub Shamilov (RUS)
Lightweight (−73 kg)	Alex Pombo (BRA)	Yertugan Torenov (KAZ)	Khashbaataryn Tsagaanbaatar (MGL)
Lightweight (−73 kg)	Alex Pombo (BRA)	Yertugan Torenov (KAZ)	Dastan Ykybayev (KAZ)
Half-middleweight (−81 kg)	Khasan Khalmurzaev (RUS)	Aliaksandr Stsiashenka (BLR)	Shukhratjon Arslanov (UZB)
Half-middleweight (−81 kg)	Khasan Khalmurzaev (RUS)	Aliaksandr Stsiashenka (BLR)	Otgonbaataryn Uuganbaatar (MGL)
Middleweight (−90 kg)	Islam Bozbayev (KAZ)	Khurshid Nabiev (UZB)	Khusen Khalmurzaev (RUS)
Middleweight (−90 kg)	Islam Bozbayev (KAZ)	Khurshid Nabiev (UZB)	Komronshokh Ustopiriyon (TJK)
Half-heavyweight (−100 kg)	Maxim Rakov (KAZ)	Rafael Buzacarini (BRA)	Erdenebilegiin Enkhbat (MGL)
Half-heavyweight (−100 kg)	Maxim Rakov (KAZ)	Rafael Buzacarini (BRA)	Utkir Kurbanov (UZB)
Heavyweight (+100 kg)	Aliaksandr Vakhaviak (BLR)	Yerzhan Shynkeyev (KAZ)	Iurii Krakovetskii (KGZ)
Heavyweight (+100 kg)	Aliaksandr Vakhaviak (BLR)	Yerzhan Shynkeyev (KAZ)	David Moura (BRA)

=== Women's events ===
Event	Gold	Silver	Bronze
Extra-lightweight (−48 kg)	Kristina Rumyantseva (RUS)	Alexandra Podryadova (KAZ)	Maryna Cherniak (UKR)
Extra-lightweight (−48 kg)	Kristina Rumyantseva (RUS)	Alexandra Podryadova (KAZ)	Shira Rishony (ISR)
Half-lightweight (−52 kg)	Ilse Heylen (BEL)	Gili Cohen (ISR)	Roni Schwartz (ISR)
Half-lightweight (−52 kg)	Ilse Heylen (BEL)	Gili Cohen (ISR)	Raquel Silva (BRA)
Lightweight (−57 kg)	Ketleyn Quadros (BRA)	Camila Minakawa (ISR)	Shushana Hevondian (UKR)
Lightweight (−57 kg)	Ketleyn Quadros (BRA)	Camila Minakawa (ISR)	Sevara Nishanbayeva (KAZ)
Half-middleweight (−63 kg)	Mariana Barros (BRA)	Mariana Silva (BRA)	Nina Milošević (SLO)
Half-middleweight (−63 kg)	Mariana Barros (BRA)	Mariana Silva (BRA)	Marian Urdabayeva (KAZ)
Middleweight (−70 kg)	Nadia Merli (BRA)	Lior Wildikan (ISR)	Luiza Gainutdinova (UKR)
Middleweight (−70 kg)	Nadia Merli (BRA)	Lior Wildikan (ISR)	Bárbara Timo (BRA)
Half-heavyweight (−78 kg)	Anastasiya Dmitrieva (RUS)	Albina Amangeldiyeva (KAZ)	Alena Kachorovskaya (RUS)
Half-heavyweight (−78 kg)	Anastasiya Dmitrieva (RUS)	Albina Amangeldiyeva (KAZ)	Viktoriya Turks (UKR)
Heavyweight (+78 kg)	Gulzhan Issanova (KAZ)	Maryna Slutskaya (BLR)	Ksenia Chibisova (RUS)
Heavyweight (+78 kg)	Gulzhan Issanova (KAZ)	Maryna Slutskaya (BLR)	Ruza Dukhturbayeva (KAZ)

Source Results

=== Medal table ===
* Host nation (Kazakhstan)

Rank	Nation	Gold	Silver	Bronze	Total
1	Kazakhstan (KAZ)*	5	5	7	17
2	Brazil (BRA)	4	2	3	9
3	Russia (RUS)	3	0	4	7
4	Belarus (BLR)	1	3	0	4
5	Belgium (BEL)	1	0	0	1
6	Israel (ISR)	0	3	2	5
7	Uzbekistan (UZB)	0	1	2	3
8	Ukraine (UKR)	0	0	4	4
9	Mongolia (MGL)	0	0	3	3
10	Kyrgyzstan (KGZ)	0	0	1	1
10	Slovenia (SLO)	0	0	1	1
10	Tajikistan (TJK)	0	0	1	1
Totals (12 entries)		14	14	28	56
