= Felipe Kitadai =

Brazilian judoka (born 1989)

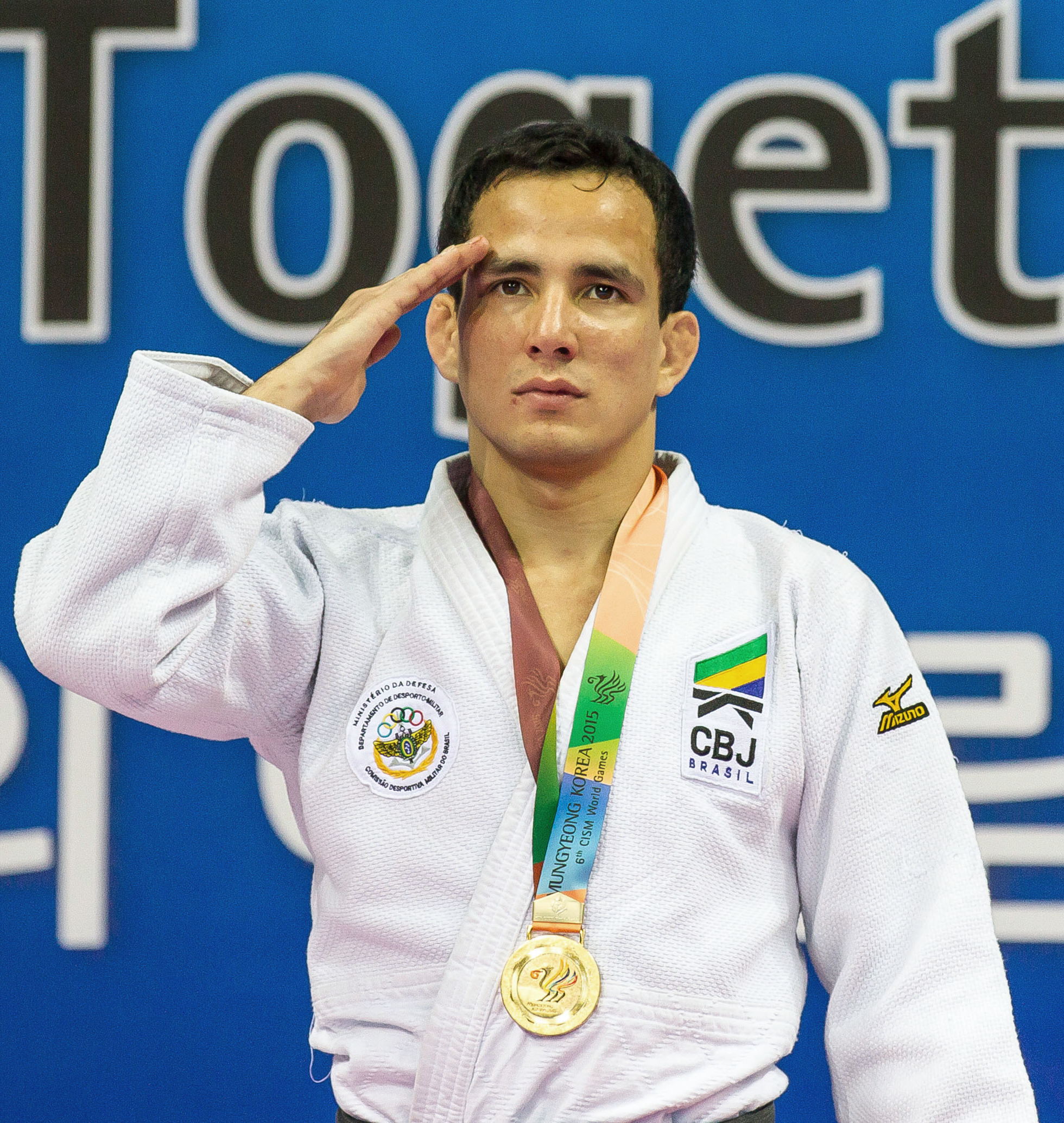
- Kitadai at the 2015 Military World Games

Personal information
- Nationality: (Brazil) Brazilian
- Born: July 28, 1989 (age 37) São Paulo, Brazil
- Occupation: Judoka
- Height: 5 ft 5 in (165 cm)
- Weight: 132 lb (60 kg)

Sport
- Country: Brazil
- Sport: Judo
- Rank: 5th dan black belt
- Club: Barueri in São Paulo; Sogipa
- Coached by: Antônio Carlos Pereira

Achievements and titles
- Olympic Games: (bronze) (2012)
- World Champ.: 5th (2015)
- Pan American Champ.: (gold) (2011, 2012, 2013, 2014, 2015, 2016)
Medal record
Men's judo
Representing Brazil
Olympic Games
Bronze medal – third place	2012 London	‍–‍60 kg
World Championships
Silver medal – second place	2011 Paris	Men's team
Pan American Games
Gold medal – first place	2011 Guadalajara	‍–‍60 kg
Silver medal – second place	2015 Toronto	‍–‍60 kg
Pan American Championships
Gold medal – first place	2011 Guadalajara	‍–‍60 kg
Gold medal – first place	2012 Montreal	‍–‍60 kg
Gold medal – first place	2013 San José	‍–‍60 kg
Gold medal – first place	2014 Guayaquil	‍–‍60 kg
Gold medal – first place	2015 Edmonton	‍–‍60 kg
Gold medal – first place	2016 Havana	‍–‍60 kg
Silver medal – second place	2010 San Salvador	‍–‍60 kg
World Masters
Bronze medal – third place	2013 Tyumen	‍–‍60 kg
IJF Grand Slam
Gold medal – first place	2019 Baku	‍–‍60 kg
Silver medal – second place	2013 Moscow	‍–‍60 kg
Silver medal – second place	2014 Tyumen	‍–‍60 kg
Silver medal – second place	2017 Abu Dhabi	‍–‍60 kg
Bronze medal – third place	2012 Tokyo	‍–‍60 kg
Military World Games
Gold medal – first place	2015 Mungyeong	‍–‍60 kg
Gold medal – first place	2015 Mungyeong	Team
Maccabiah Games
Bronze medal – third place	2009 Israel	‍–‍60 kg

Profile at external databases
- IJF: 2072
- JudoInside.com: 46007
- Updated on 25 May 2023

Felipe Kitadai (born July 28, 1989) is a judoka from Brazil. He won a bronze medal at the 2012 Olympics and a gold at the 2011 Pan American Games. He also won gold medals six consecutive times in the Pan American Games Judo Championships: at 2011 Guadalaraja, 2012 Montreal, 2013 San José, 2014 Guayaquil, 2015 Edmonton and 2016 Havana.

== Judo career ==
Kitadai was born in São Paulo, Brazil, and is a member of the athletic club Barueri in São Paulo and the club Sogipa. He is coached on the Brazil national team by Luis Shinohara and Mario Tsutsui.

=== 2009-2012 ===
In 2009, Kitadai, who is Jewish, won a bronze medal in the 2009 Maccabiah Games in Tel Aviv, Israel, at U60, beating American Lindsey Durlacher along the way. In 2010, he came in second in the Pan American Judo Championships in San Salvador, and won the World Cup Rome, both at U60.

In 2011, Kitadai won the Pan American Judo Championships in Guadalajara, the 5th International Military Sports Council (CISM) World Military Games Teams in Rio de Janeiro, and the Pan American Games in Guadalajara, all at U60. In 2012, he won the Pan American Judo Championships in Montreal at U60.

=== 2012 Summer Olympics ===
On July 28, 2012, his 23rd birthday, Kitadai won a bronze medal in the under 60 kg category at the London 2012 Olympic Games. He won by beating Davaadorjiin Tömörkhüleg and Eisa Majrashi before losing to Rishod Sobirov. Because Sobirov reached the semifinals, Kitadai was entered into the repechage. In the repechage, he beat Choi Gwang-Hyeon and then Elio Verde to win the bronze medal. He carried the medal everywhere. On July 30, he damaged the ribbon and dented the medal when he dropped it in the shower. The IOC issued him a new medal at the request of the Brazilian Olympic Committee. The medal reportedly contains only $4.71 worth of metal.

=== 2013-2016 ===
In 2013, Kitadai won the Pan American Judo Championships in San Jose, and the World Military Championships in Astana, both at U60.

Participating in the 2013 Judo World Masters (second most important competition on the judo circuit after the World Championships), Kitadai won a bronze medal, repeating his performance from the 2012 Olympics.

At the 2013 Judo Grand Slam Moscow, Kitadai reached the final, winning the silver medal.

At the 2014 Judo Grand Slam Tyumen Kitadai won another silver medal.

At the 2015 Pan American Games, he won a silver medal in the 60 kg category.

At the 2015 World Judo Championships, Kitadai had his best individual appearance at the World Championships, finishing in 5th place. He reached the quarter-finals where he was beaten by world number 2 Ganbatyn Boldbaatar of Mongolia. In the repechage, he beat Choi In-hyuk, from South Korea, to advance to the bronze medal match. And, in the match that was worth the podium, Kitadai lost to the Japanese Toru Shishime.

In April 2016, Kitadai reached his sixth consecutive championship at the Pan American Judo Championships. He won gold in the 2011 Guadalaraja, 2012 Montreal, 2013 San José, 2014 Guayaquil, 2015 Edmonton and 2016 Havana editions.

=== 2016 Summer Olympics ===
He participated at the 2016 Olympics, beating Walide Khyar and Tobias Englmaier before losing to Orkhan Safarov. Because Safarov reached the semifinals, Kitadai was entered into the repechage where he lost to Diyorbek Urozboev in his first match.

=== 2016-2020 ===
At the 2017 Judo Grand Slam Abu Dhabi, Kitadai won a silver medal. He reached the final and only lost the gold because he was punished three times. It was his first podium after being away for a long time recovering from surgery on his right shoulder.

Kitadai obtained one of his biggest individual titles in May 2019. Participating in the 2019 Judo Grand Slam Baku (Grand Slam is the tournament that gives the most points in the judo ranking after the Olympics, the World Championships and the World Masters), he obtained the gold medal, winning five fights.

=== Retirement ===
Kitadai announced his retirement in March 2022.

== Post-career in judo ==
Between January 2022 and September 2023 he worked as a youth national trainer for Austria Judo.

== See also ==
- List of select Jewish judokas
