= Vincent Limare =

French judoka (born 1992)

Personal information
- Born: 26 September 1992 (age 33) Rouen
- Occupation: Judoka
- Website: www.vincentlimare.com

Sport
- Country: France
- Sport: Judo
- Weight class: ‍–‍60 kg

Achievements and titles
- World Champ.: R16 (2015)
- European Champ.: R16 (2014, 2016)
Medal record
Men's judo
Representing France
World Masters
Silver medal – second place	2016 Guadalajara	‍–‍60 kg
IJF Grand Slam
Silver medal – second place	2015 Baku	‍–‍60 kg
Silver medal – second place	2015 Paris	‍–‍60 kg
IJF Grand Prix
Gold medal – first place	2014 Qingdao	‍–‍60 kg
Bronze medal – third place	2014 Düsseldorf	‍–‍60 kg
Bronze medal – third place	2021 Zagreb	‍–‍60 kg
European Junior Championships
Silver medal – second place	2011 Lommel	‍–‍60 kg
European Cadet Championships
Bronze medal – third place	2008 Sarajevo	‍–‍55 kg
Summer Universiade
Silver medal – second place	2017 Taipei	‍–‍60 kg

Profile at external databases
- IJF: 4143
- JudoInside.com: 49959
- Updated on 20 November 2022

Vincent Limare (born 26 September 1992) is a French judoka. He is the gold medalist in the ‍–‍60 kg at the 2014 Judo Grand Prix Qingdao
