= Otar Bestaev =

Russian-Kyrgyzstani judoka

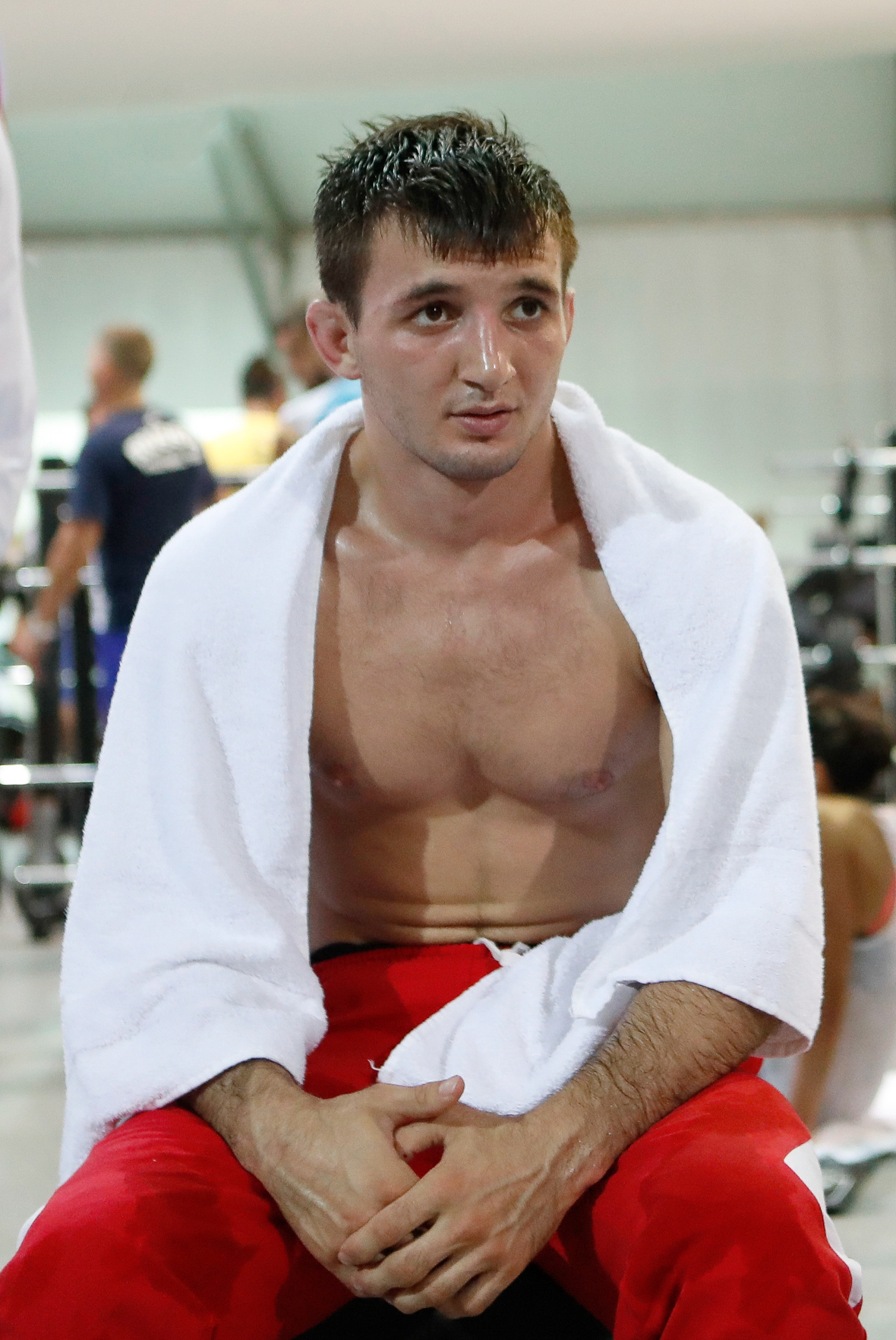
- Bestaev at the 2016 Olympics

Personal information
- Born: 28 October 1991 (age 34) Vladikavkaz, Russia
- Occupation: Judoka
- Height: 160 cm (5 ft 3 in)

Sport
- Country: Kyrgyzstan
- Sport: Judo
- Weight class: –60 kg

Achievements and titles
- Olympic Games: R16 (2016)
- World Champ.: R16 (2018)
- Asian Champ.: (bronze) (2015)
Medal record
Men's judo
Representing Kyrgyzstan
Asian Championships
Bronze medal – third place	2015 Kuwait City	–60 kg
IJF Grand Prix
Silver medal – second place	2016 Budapest	–60 kg
Bronze medal – third place	2015 Tashkent	–60 kg

Profile at external databases
- IJF: 19015
- JudoInside.com: 46335
- Updated on 8 December 2022

Otar Bestaev (born 28 October 1991) is a Russian-Kyrgyzstani judoka. He competed at the 2016 Summer Olympics in Rio de Janeiro, in the men's 60 kg, but lost in the second bout.
