= Choi In-hyuk =

South Korean judoka

Personal information
- Nationality: South Korean
- Born: 23 February 1994 (age 32)
- Occupation: Judoka

Sport
- Country: South Korea
- Sport: Judo
- Weight class: –60 kg

Achievements and titles
- World Champ.: 7th (2014, 2015)
- Asian Champ.: R16 (2019)
Medal record
Men's judo
Representing South Korea
World Championships
Bronze medal – third place	2018 Baku	Mixed team
IJF Grand Slam
Bronze medal – third place	2016 Tokyo	–60 kg
IJF Grand Prix
Gold medal – first place	2013 Qingdao	–60 kg
Bronze medal – third place	2019 Hohhot	–60 kg
World Juniors Championships
Bronze medal – third place	2014 Fort Lauderdale	–60 kg

Profile at external databases
- IJF: 14947
- JudoInside.com: 85846
- Updated on 25 November 2022

Choi In-hyuk (born 23 February 1994) is a South Korean judoka.

He participated at the 2018 World Judo Championships, winning a medal.
