= Nabor Castillo =

Mexican judoka (born 1990)

Personal information
- Full name: Nabor Castillo Pérez
- Nationality: Mexican
- Born: 4 October 1990 (age 35)
- Occupation: Judoka

Sport
- Country: Mexico
- Sport: Judo
- Weight class: –60 kg, –66 kg

Achievements and titles
- Olympic Games: R16 (2012)
- World Champ.: R16 (2015)
- Pan American Champ.: (2010)
Medal record
Men's judo
Representing Mexico
Pan American Games
Silver medal – second place	2011 Guadalajara	–60 kg
Pan American Championships
Gold medal – first place	2010 San Salvador	–60 kg
Silver medal – second place	2011 Guadalajara	–60 kg
Silver medal – second place	2013 San José	–60 kg
Silver medal – second place	2014 Guayaquil	–60 kg
IJF Grand Prix
Bronze medal – third place	2017 Cancún	–66 kg
Pan American Junior Championships
Bronze medal – third place	2009 San Salvador	–60 kg

Profile at external databases
- IJF: 2997
- JudoInside.com: 53759
- Updated on 7 December 2022

Nabor Castillo Pérez (Note: In this Spanish name, the first or paternal surname is Castillo and the second or maternal family name is Pérez.) (born 4 October 1990 in Pachuca, Hidalgo) is a judoka from Mexico.

After winning gold in Pan American Judo Championships he said that before championships he had hoped to win a medal but did not know what color it would be. His primary intention when entering was to gain points to qualify for the 2012 Summer Olympics. He did so, and reached the third round in London, beating Khom Ratanakmony before losing to Elio Verde.

Castillo was the first Mexican judoka to win a medal at a World Judo Grand Prix event.

== Achievements ==
Year	Tournament	Place	Weight class
2010	Pan American Judo Championships	1st	Lightweight (60 kg)
2011	Pan American Judo Championships	2nd	Lightweight (60 kg)
2013	Pan American Judo Championships	2nd	Lightweight (60 kg)
2014	Pan American Judo Championships	2nd	Lightweight (60 kg)
