= Simon Yacoub =

Palestinian judoka

Simon Yacoub (born June 9, 1989, in Leipzig, Germany) is a Palestinian judoka. He competed at the 2016 Summer Olympics in the men's 60 kg event, in which he was eliminated in the first round by Walide Khyar.
