= Beslan Mudranov =

Russian judoka

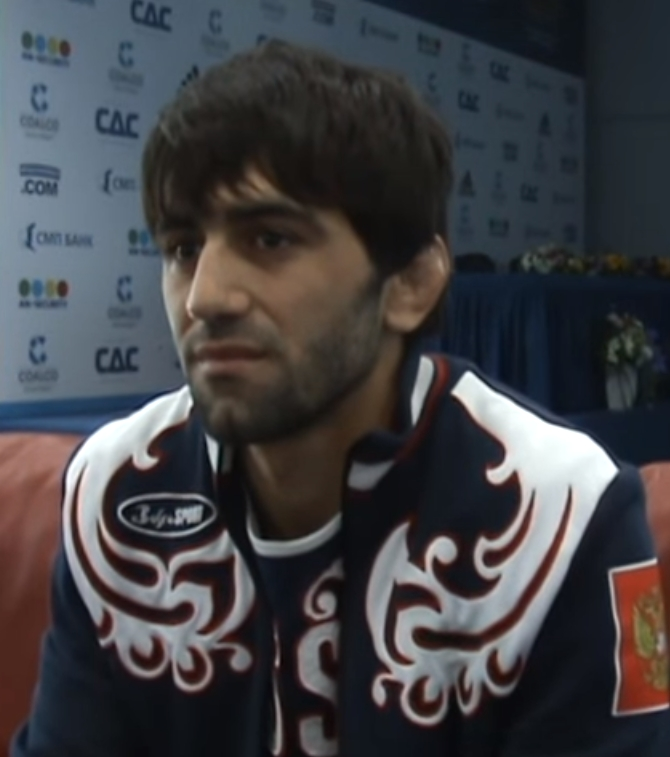

Personal information
- Nationality: Russian
- Born: Беслан Мудранов; 7 July 1986 (age 39) Kabardino-Balkarian ASSR, Russian SFSR, Soviet Union
- Occupation: Judoka
- Height: 170 cm (5 ft 7 in)

Sport
- Country: Russia
- Sport: Judo
- Weight class: –60 kg

Achievements and titles
- Olympic Games: (gold) (2016)
- World Champ.: (silver) (2014)
- European Champ.: (gold) (2012, 2014, 2015)
Medal record
Men's judo
Representing Russia
Olympic Games
Gold medal – first place	2016 Rio de Janeiro	‍–‍60 kg
World Championships
Silver medal – second place	2014 Chelyabinsk	‍–‍60 kg
European Games
Gold medal – first place	2015 Baku	‍–‍60 kg
European Championships
Gold medal – first place	2012 Chelyabinsk	‍–‍60 kg
Gold medal – first place	2014 Montpellier	‍–‍60 kg
Bronze medal – third place	2018 Tel Aviv	‍–‍60 kg
World Masters
Bronze medal – third place	2011 Baku	‍–‍60 kg
Bronze medal – third place	2012 Almaty	‍–‍60 kg
IJF Grand Slam
Silver medal – second place	2015 Tokyo	‍–‍60 kg
Bronze medal – third place	2009 Moscow	‍–‍60 kg
Bronze medal – third place	2013 Paris	‍–‍60 kg
Bronze medal – third place	2018 Ekaterinburg	‍–‍60 kg
IJF Grand Prix
Gold medal – first place	2010 Abu Dhabi	‍–‍60 kg
Gold medal – first place	2012 Abu Dhabi	‍–‍60 kg
Gold medal – first place	2013 Rijeka	‍–‍60 kg
Gold medal – first place	2013 Abu Dhabi	‍–‍60 kg
Gold medal – first place	2014 Samsun	‍–‍60 kg
Silver medal – second place	2010 Qingdao	‍–‍60 kg
Bronze medal – third place	2011 Amsterdam	‍–‍60 kg
Bronze medal – third place	2016 Düsseldorf	‍–‍60 kg
Men's sambo
World Championships
Silver medal – second place	2007 Prague	‍–‍52 kg

Profile at external databases
- IJF: 1937
- JudoInside.com: 55570
- Updated on 24 May 2023

Beslan Zaudinovich Mudranov (Russian: Беслан Заудинович Мудранов; born 7 July 1986) (Circassian: Мудран Беслъэн) is a Russian judoka (since 2008) and former Sambo wrestler (2003–2008) of Circassian descent. He won the Olympic gold medal in the Men's ‍–‍60 kg judo event at the 2016 Summer Olympics. He also won three gold medals at European level, in 2012, 2014 and 2015.

== Career ==
Beslan won gold medals in the ‍–‍60 kg category at the European Judo Championships in 2012, 2014 and 2015. For 2015's win he received two gold medals, as the event served the purpose of the European Games as well as the European Judo Championships. His coach is Rudolf Mikhailovich Baboyan.

On the first day of the 2016 Summer Olympics, Beslan earned Russia's first gold medal at the 2016 Summer Olympics in Rio de Janeiro in the ‍–‍60 kg division. In the final he defeated Yeldos Smetov from Kazakhstan in just 44 seconds.

== Personal life ==
Mudranov was born in 1986 in Baksan, Kabardino-Balkar ASSR. He began training in martial arts at the age of 13. Upon the recommendation of his younger brother, he started as a Sambist, then also practised freestyle wrestling. After moving to Maykop, Beslan was enrolled at the Adyghe State University in the Institute of Physical Culture and Judo. In 2006 he moved to Armavir, and two years later he switched to judo.

Beslan's father, Zaudin Shafigovich, is an over-the-road trucker, and his mother, Asya Khasanovna, a housewife. His brother Aslan (born 1987) is a Merited Master of Sports in Sambo and judo.

Beslan is married, and has a daughter with his spouse.
