= Jeroen Mooren =

Dutch judoka (born 1985)

Personal information
- Born: 30 July 1985 (age 41)
- Occupation: Judoka

Sport
- Country: Netherlands
- Sport: Judo
- Weight class: ‍–‍60 kg

Achievements and titles
- Olympic Games: R32 (2012, 2016)
- World Champ.: R32 (2010, 2011, 2014, 2015)
- European Champ.: (bronze) (2010, 2012)
Medal record
Men's judo
Representing the Netherlands
European Championships
Bronze medal – third place	2010 Vienna	‍–‍60 kg
Bronze medal – third place	2012 Chelyabinsk	‍–‍60 kg
IJF Grand Slam
Silver medal – second place	2010 Moscow	‍–‍60 kg
Bronze medal – third place	2010 Rio de Janeiro	‍–‍60 kg
IJF Grand Prix
Gold medal – first place	2009 Tunis	‍–‍60 kg
Silver medal – second place	2009 Qingdao	‍–‍60 kg
Silver medal – second place	2015 Qingdao	‍–‍60 kg
Bronze medal – third place	2009 Hamburg	‍–‍60 kg
Bronze medal – third place	2009 Abu Dhabi	‍–‍60 kg
European U23 Championships
Gold medal – first place	2005 Kyiv	‍–‍60 kg
Silver medal – second place	2006 Moscow	‍–‍60 kg
European Junior Championships
Gold medal – first place	2004 Sofia	‍–‍60 kg
Summer Universiade
Gold medal – first place	2009 Belgrade	‍–‍60 kg

Profile at external databases
- IJF: 1812
- JudoInside.com: 9328
- Updated on 14 November 2022

Jeroen Mooren (born 30 July 1985, Nijmegen) is a Dutch former judoka who competed in the men's 60 kg category. At the 2012 Summer Olympics, he was defeated in the second round.
