= Toru Shishime =

Japanese judoka

Tōru Shishime
Personal information
- Native name: 志々目徹
- Nationality: Japan
- Born: 8 March 1992 (age 34) Miyazaki, Japan
- Occupation: Judoka
- Height: 156 cm (5 ft 1 in)

Sport
- Country: Japan
- Sport: Judo
- Weight class: –60 kg

Achievements and titles
- World Champ.: (bronze) (2015)
- Asian Champ.: (silver) (2018)
Medal record
World Championships
Bronze medal – third place	2015 Astana	‍–‍60 kg
Asian Games
Silver medal – second place	2018 Jakarta	‍–‍60 kg
Bronze medal – third place	2014 Incheon	‍–‍60 kg
Bronze medal – third place	2014 Incheon	Men's team
IJF Grand Slam
Gold medal – first place	2016 Paris	‍–‍60 kg
Gold medal – first place	2017 Baku	‍–‍60 kg
Gold medal – first place	2018 Paris	‍–‍60 kg
Silver medal – second place	2010 Tokyo	‍–‍60 kg
Silver medal – second place	2014 Tokyo	‍–‍60 kg
Bronze medal – third place	2013 Tokyo	‍–‍60 kg
Bronze medal – third place	2015 Tokyo	‍–‍60 kg
Bronze medal – third place	2017 Tokyo	‍–‍60 kg
IJF Grand Prix
Gold medal – first place	2014 Düsseldorf	‍–‍60 kg
Gold medal – first place	2015 Düsseldorf	‍–‍60 kg
Gold medal – first place	2017 Hohhot	‍–‍60 kg
Bronze medal – third place	2014 Ulaanbaatar	‍–‍60 kg
Bronze medal – third place	2015 Budapest	‍–‍60 kg
World Juniors Championships
Gold medal – first place	2009 Paris	‍–‍55 kg
Gold medal – first place	2010 Agadir	‍–‍60 kg
Summer Universiade
Gold medal – first place	2011 Shenzhen	Men's team
Bronze medal – third place	2011 Shenzhen	‍–‍60 kg

Profile at external databases
- IJF: 3272
- JudoInside.com: 60687
- Updated on 3 July 2023

Toru Shishime (志々目 徹, Shishime Toru; born 8 March 1992 in Miyazaki) is a male Japanese judoka.

He started judo at the age of 4.

His favorite technique is Uchi Mata.

In 2009, he won the gold medal in the -55 kg weight class at the World Judo Championships Juniors in Paris.

In 2010, he won the gold medal in the -60 kg weight class at the World Judo Championships Juniors in Agadir.

In 2015, he won the bronze medal in the Extra-lightweight (60 kg) division at the 2015 World Judo Championships.
