= Kim Won-jin (judoka) =

South Korean judoka (born 1992)

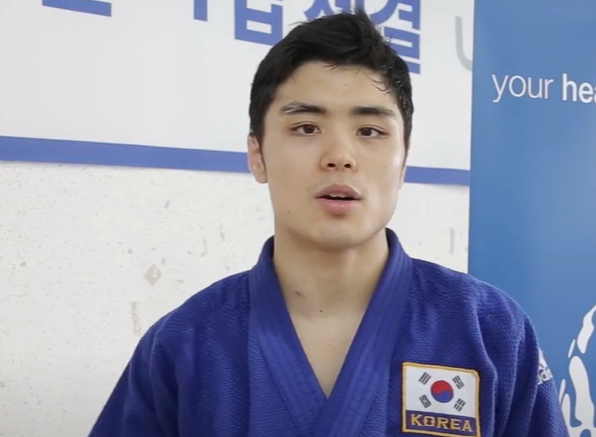

Personal information
- Native name: 김원진
- Nationality: South Korea
- Born: 1 May 1992 (age 34) Cheorwon, South Korea
- Occupation: Judoka
- Height: 170 cm (5 ft 7 in)

Sport
- Country: South Korea
- Sport: Judo
- Weight class: ‍–‍60 kg

Achievements and titles
- Olympic Games: 5th (2020)
- World Champ.: (bronze) (2013, 2015)
- Asian Champ.: (gold) (2015)
Medal record
Men's judo
Representing South Korea
Olympic Games
Bronze medal – third place	2024 Paris	Mixed team
World Championships
Bronze medal – third place	2013 Rio de Janeiro	‍–‍60 kg
Bronze medal – third place	2015 Astana	‍–‍60 kg
Asian Games
Bronze medal – third place	2014 Incheon	‍–‍60 kg
Asian Championships
Gold medal – first place	2015 Kuwait City	‍–‍60 kg
Silver medal – second place	2013 Bangkok	‍–‍60 kg
Silver medal – second place	2022 Nur‑Sultan	‍–‍60 kg
World Masters
Gold medal – first place	2021 Doha	‍–‍60 kg
Bronze medal – third place	2016 Guadalajara	‍–‍60 kg
Bronze medal – third place	2023 Budapest	‍–‍60 kg
IJF Grand Slam
Gold medal – first place	2014 Tokyo	‍–‍60 kg
Gold medal – first place	2023 Tashkent	‍–‍60 kg
Silver medal – second place	2012 Paris	‍–‍60 kg
Silver medal – second place	2013 Tokyo	‍–‍60 kg
Bronze medal – third place	2015 Tokyo	‍–‍60 kg
Bronze medal – third place	2016 Paris	‍–‍60 kg
Bronze medal – third place	2018 Osaka	‍–‍60 kg
Bronze medal – third place	2019 Osaka	‍–‍60 kg
Bronze medal – third place	2020 Düsseldorf	‍–‍60 kg
Bronze medal – third place	2023 Baku	‍–‍60 kg
IJF Grand Prix
Gold medal – first place	2013 Jeju	‍–‍60 kg
Gold medal – first place	2014 Jeju	‍–‍60 kg
Gold medal – first place	2015 Jeju	‍–‍60 kg
Gold medal – first place	2016 Düsseldorf	‍–‍60 kg
Gold medal – first place	2019 Hohhot	‍–‍60 kg
Gold medal – first place	2020 Tel Aviv	‍–‍60 kg
Silver medal – second place	2015 Düsseldorf	‍–‍60 kg
Silver medal – second place	2022 Zagreb	‍–‍60 kg
Asian Junior Championships
Gold medal – first place	2009 Beirut	‍–‍55 kg
Summer Universiade
Gold medal – first place	2011 Shenzhen	‍–‍60 kg
Gold medal – first place	2015 Gwangju	‍–‍60 kg
Silver medal – second place	2013 Kazan	Men's team
Bronze medal – third place	2013 Kazan	‍–‍60 kg

Profile at external databases
- IJF: 4036
- JudoInside.com: 69467
- Updated on 24 September 2023

Kim Won-Jin (Korean: 김원진, born 1 May 1992) is a South Korean judoka. He is a two-time World Championship bronze medalist and won a gold medal at the 2015 Asian Judo Championships.

On 8 February 2016, after winning bronze at the Grand Slam Paris Kim reached world no.1 in the men's 60 kg world rankings, holding the top spot until the 2016 Summer Olympics where he was eliminated in the quarterfinals.

In 2021, Kim won the gold medal in his event at the 2021 Judo World Masters held in Doha, Qatar.

== Competitive Record ==
Judo Record
Total	109
Wins	82
by Ippon	37
Losses	27
by Ippon	14

(as of 19 February 2016)

== Achievements ==
2009
(silver) Asian U20 Championships −55 kg, Beirut
2010
(silver) World Cup −60 kg, Rome
2011
(gold) Summer Universiade −60 kg, Shenzhen
(bronze) World Cup −60 kg, Ulan Bator
2012
(silver) Grand Slam −60 kg, Paris
(silver) World Cup −60 kg, Ulan Bator
(silver) World Cup −60 kg, Jeju
(silver) East Asian Games −60 kg, Gochang
(bronze) World Cup −60 kg, Oberwart
2013
(silver) Asian Championships −60 kg, Bangkok
(silver) Summer Universiade Team event, Kazan
(bronze) Summer Universiade −60 kg, Kazan
(bronze) World Championships −60 kg, Rio de Janeiro
