= Amiran Papinashvili =

Georgian judoka (born 1988)

Personal information
- Nationality: Georgian
- Born: ამირან პაპინაშვილი 17 June 1988 (age 38) Kaspi, Georgian SSR, Soviet Union
- Occupation: Judoka
- Height: 162 cm (5 ft 4 in)

Sport
- Country: Georgia
- Sport: Judo
- Weight class: –60 kg

Achievements and titles
- Olympic Games: 5th (2016)
- World Champ.: (bronze) (2014, 2018)
- European Champ.: (gold) (2013)
Medal record
Men's judo
Representing Georgia
World Championships
Gold medal – first place	2013 Rio de Janeiro	Men's team
Bronze medal – third place	2014 Chelyabinsk	‍–‍60 kg
Bronze medal – third place	2014 Chelyabinsk	Men's team
Bronze medal – third place	2015 Astana	Men's team
Bronze medal – third place	2018 Baku	‍–‍60 kg
European Games
Silver medal – second place	2015 Baku	Men's team
Bronze medal – third place	2015 Baku	‍–‍60 kg
Bronze medal – third place	2019 Minsk	‍–‍60 kg
European Championships
Gold medal – first place	2013 Budapest	‍–‍60 kg
Gold medal – first place	2014 Montpellier	Men's team
Gold medal – first place	2016 Kazan	Men's team
Silver medal – second place	2014 Montpellier	‍–‍60 kg
Bronze medal – third place	2012 Chelyabinsk	‍–‍60 kg
World Masters
Silver medal – second place	2018 Guangzhou	‍–‍60 kg
Bronze medal – third place	2013 Tyumen	‍–‍60 kg
IJF Grand Slam
Gold medal – first place	2013 Moscow	‍–‍60 kg
Gold medal – first place	2015 Abu Dhabi	‍–‍60 kg
Gold medal – first place	2018 Abu Dhabi	‍–‍60 kg
Silver medal – second place	2009 Paris	‍–‍60 kg
Silver medal – second place	2014 Paris	‍–‍60 kg
Silver medal – second place	2017 Ekaterinburg	‍–‍60 kg
Bronze medal – third place	2011 Paris	‍–‍60 kg
Bronze medal – third place	2012 Paris	‍–‍60 kg
Bronze medal – third place	2012 Rio de Janeiro	‍–‍60 kg
Bronze medal – third place	2013 Paris	‍–‍60 kg
Bronze medal – third place	2017 Paris	‍–‍60 kg
IJF Grand Prix
Gold medal – first place	2010 Rotterdam	‍–‍60 kg
Gold medal – first place	2011 Baku	‍–‍60 kg
Gold medal – first place	2014 Havana	‍–‍60 kg
Gold medal – first place	2017 Zagreb	‍–‍60 kg
Silver medal – second place	2011 Amsterdam	‍–‍60 kg
Silver medal – second place	2012 Abu Dhabi	‍–‍60 kg
Silver medal – second place	2014 Budapest	‍–‍60 kg
Silver medal – second place	2017 Düsseldorf	‍–‍60 kg
Silver medal – second place	2017 Tbilisi	‍–‍60 kg
Silver medal – second place	2018 Tbilisi	‍–‍60 kg
Bronze medal – third place	2011 Abu Dhabi	‍–‍60 kg
Bronze medal – third place	2013 Düsseldorf	‍–‍60 kg
Bronze medal – third place	2016 Tbilisi	‍–‍60 kg
Bronze medal – third place	2018 Budapest	‍–‍60 kg
Bronze medal – third place	2019 Marrakesh	‍–‍60 kg

Profile at external databases
- IJF: 2130
- JudoInside.com: 43325
- Updated on 23 May 2023

Amiran Papinashvili (born 17 June 1988) is a Georgian judoka. He won gold medal in 2013 European Judo Championships, silver in 2014 European Judo Championships and bronze in 2012 European Judo Championships. He also competed for Georgia at the 2016 Summer Olympics.
