= Eisa Majrashi =

Saudi Arabian judoka (born 1986)

Personal information
- Born: 19 July 1986 (age 39)
- Occupation: Judoka

Sport
- Sport: Judo

Eisa Majrashi (Arabic: عيسى مجرشي; born 19 July 1986, Jeddah) is a Saudi Arabian judoka who competes in the men's 60 kg category. At the 2012 Summer Olympics, he was defeated in the third round by Felipe Kitadai. Majrashi had a bye in the first round and beat Raúl Lall in the second.
