= Juho Reinvall =

Finnish judoka

Juho Reinvall (born 24 August 1988) is a Finnish judoka. He competed at the 2016 Summer Olympics in the men's 60 kg event, in which he was eliminated in the second round by Tsogtbaatar Tsend-Ochir.
