= Ganbatyn Boldbaatar =

Mongolian judoka (born 1987)

Personal information
- Native name: Ганбатын Болдбаатар
- Nationality: Mongolian
- Born: 3 January 1987 (age 39) Bulgan, Mongolia
- Occupation: Judoka
- Height: 1.60 m (5 ft 3 in)

Sport
- Country: Mongolia
- Sport: Judo
- Weight class: –60 kg

Achievements and titles
- World Champ.: (2014)
- Asian Champ.: (gold) (2009)
Medal record
Men's judo
Representing Mongolia
World Championships
Gold medal – first place	2014 Chelyabinsk	‍–‍60 kg
Bronze medal – third place	2015 Astana	Men's team
Bronze medal – third place	2017 Budapest	‍–‍60 kg
Asian Games
Silver medal – second place	2014 Incheon	‍–‍60 kg
Asian Championships
Gold medal – first place	2009 Taipei	‍–‍60 kg
World Masters
Silver medal – second place	2013 Tyumen	‍–‍60 kg
Bronze medal – third place	2015 Rabat	‍–‍60 kg
IJF Grand Slam
Gold medal – first place	2014 Paris	‍–‍60 kg
Gold medal – first place	2016 Baku	‍–‍60 kg
Bronze medal – third place	2012 Moscow	‍–‍60 kg
IJF Grand Prix
Gold medal – first place	2010 Qingdao	‍–‍60 kg
Gold medal – first place	2013 Düsseldorf	‍–‍60 kg
Gold medal – first place	2013 Ulaanbaatar	‍–‍60 kg
Gold medal – first place	2014 Ulaanbaatar	‍–‍60 kg
Gold medal – first place	2017 Düsseldorf	‍–‍60 kg
Gold medal – first place	2018 Tashkent	‍–‍60 kg
Silver medal – second place	2011 Abu Dhabi	‍–‍60 kg
Silver medal – second place	2012 Düsseldorf	‍–‍60 kg
Silver medal – second place	2015 Ulaanbaatar	‍–‍60 kg
Silver medal – second place	2015 Jeju	‍–‍60 kg
Silver medal – second place	2019 Budapest	‍–‍60 kg
Bronze medal – third place	2011 Düsseldorf	‍–‍60 kg
Bronze medal – third place	2016 Tbilisi	‍–‍60 kg
Bronze medal – third place	2017 Hohhot	‍–‍60 kg
Bronze medal – third place	2018 The Hague	‍–‍60 kg
Asian Junior Championships
Gold medal – first place	2006 Jeju	‍–‍60 kg

Profile at external databases
- IJF: 185
- JudoInside.com: 23638
- Updated on 26 June 2023

Ganbatyn Boldbaatar (Mongolian: Ганбатын Болдбаатар) is a male Mongolian judoka. He won the gold medal in the ‍–‍60 kg category at the 2014 World Judo Championships.
