= Tommy Arshansky =

Israeli judoka (born 1991)

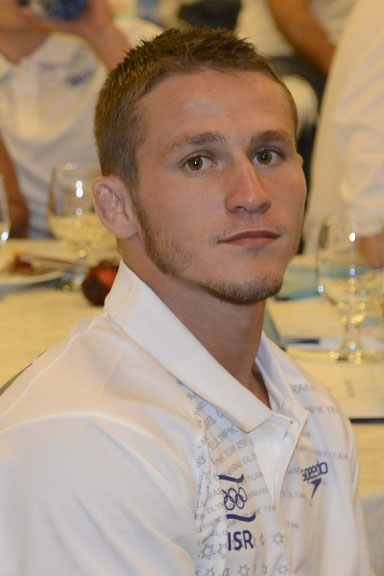
- Tommy Arshansky, 2012

Personal information
- Native name: טומי ארשנסקי
- Born: 26 September 1991 (age 34) Moscow, Russian SFSR, Soviet Union
- Occupation: Judoka

Sport
- Country: Israel
- Sport: Judo
- Weight class: ‍–‍60 kg
- Rank: 4th dan black belt

Achievements and titles
- Olympic Games: R16 (2012)
- World Champ.: 5th (2014)
- European Champ.: (bronze) (2013)
Medal record
Men's judo
Representing Israel
European Championships
Bronze medal – third place	2013 Budapest	‍–‍60 kg
European Cadet Championships
Gold medal – first place	2007 Valletta	‍–‍50 kg
European Youth Olympic Festival
Silver medal – second place	2007 Belgrade	‍–‍50 kg

Profile at external databases
- IJF: 1432
- JudoInside.com: 45850
- Updated on 4 May 2025

Artiom "Tommy" Arshansky (Hebrew: ארטיום "טומי" ארשנסקי; born 26 September 1991) is an Israeli judoka. He represented Israel at the 2012 Summer Olympics competing in the men's extra lightweight (under 60 kg) weight category and won a bronze medal at the 2013 European Championships.

Arshansky was born in Moscow and, after his family immigrated to Israel, lived in Tirat Carmel, Haifa, and Kiryat Yam.
