= 2015 World Judo Championships =

Judo competition

Judo 2015 World Judo Championships
- Venue: Alau Ice Palace
- Location: Astana, Kazakhstan
- Dates: 24–30 August 2015
- Competitors: 723 from 120 nations
- Total prize money: 300,000$

Champions
- Men's team: Japan (6th title)
- Women's team: Japan (5th title)

Competition at external databases
- Links: IJF • JudoInside

The 2015 World Judo Championships were held in Astana, Kazakhstan, from 24–30 August 2015. The competition was held at the Alau Ice Palace.

== Schedule ==
All times are local (UTC+6).

| Event date | Starting time | Event details |
|---|---|---|
| 24 August | 11:00 | Men −60 kg |
| 24 August | 11:00 | Women −48 kg |
| 25 August | 11:00 | Men −66 kg |
| 25 August | 11:00 | Women −52 kg |
| 26 August | 11:00 | Men −73 kg |
| 26 August | 11:00 | Women −57 kg |
| 27 August | 11:00 | Men −81 kg |
| 27 August | 11:00 | Women −63 kg |
| 28 August | 11:00 | Men −90 kg |
| 28 August | 11:00 | Women −70 kg |
| 28 August | 11:00 | Women −78 kg |
| 29 August | 11:00 | Men −100 kg |
| 29 August | 11:00 | Men +100 kg |
| 29 August | 11:00 | Women +78 kg |
| 30 August | 10:00 | Men team |
| 30 August | 10:00 | Women team |

== Medal summary ==
=== Medal table ===
* Host nation (Kazakhstan)

| Rank | Nation | Gold | Silver | Bronze | Total |
|---|---|---|---|---|---|
| 1 | Japan (JPN) | 8 | 4 | 5 | 17 |
| 2 | France (FRA) | 2 | 2 | 2 | 6 |
| 3 | South Korea (KOR) | 2 | 1 | 3 | 6 |
| 4 | Kazakhstan (KAZ)* | 1 | 1 | 0 | 2 |
| 4 | Slovenia (SLO) | 1 | 1 | 0 | 2 |
| 6 | Argentina (ARG) | 1 | 0 | 0 | 1 |
| 6 | China (CHN) | 1 | 0 | 0 | 1 |
| 8 | Russia (RUS) | 0 | 2 | 1 | 3 |
| 9 | Romania (ROU) | 0 | 2 | 0 | 2 |
| 10 | Germany (GER) | 0 | 1 | 3 | 4 |
| 11 | Poland (POL) | 0 | 1 | 0 | 1 |
| 11 | Spain (ESP) | 0 | 1 | 0 | 1 |
| 13 | Mongolia (MGL) | 0 | 0 | 4 | 4 |
| 14 | Georgia (GEO) | 0 | 0 | 3 | 3 |
| 15 | Brazil (BRA) | 0 | 0 | 2 | 2 |
| 16 | Belarus (BLR) | 0 | 0 | 1 | 1 |
| 16 | Belgium (BEL) | 0 | 0 | 1 | 1 |
| 16 | Canada (CAN) | 0 | 0 | 1 | 1 |
| 16 | Colombia (COL) | 0 | 0 | 1 | 1 |
| 16 | Cuba (CUB) | 0 | 0 | 1 | 1 |
| 16 | Israel (ISR) | 0 | 0 | 1 | 1 |
| 16 | Netherlands (NED) | 0 | 0 | 1 | 1 |
| 16 | Ukraine (UKR) | 0 | 0 | 1 | 1 |
| 16 | Uzbekistan (UZB) | 0 | 0 | 1 | 1 |
| Totals (24 entries) | | 16 | 16 | 32 | 64 |

=== Men's events ===
| Event | Gold | Silver | Bronze |
|---|---|---|---|
| Extra-lightweight (60 kg) | Yeldos Smetov; Kazakhstan | Rustam Ibrayev; Kazakhstan | Toru Shishime; Japan |
| Extra-lightweight (60 kg) | Yeldos Smetov; Kazakhstan | Rustam Ibrayev; Kazakhstan | Kim Won-jin; South Korea |
| Half-lightweight (66 kg) | An Ba-ul; South Korea | Mikhail Pulyaev; Russia | Golan Pollack; Israel |
| Half-lightweight (66 kg) | An Ba-ul; South Korea | Mikhail Pulyaev; Russia | Rishod Sobirov; Uzbekistan |
| Lightweight (73 kg) | Shohei Ono; Japan | Riki Nakaya; Japan | Sainjargalyn Nyam-Ochir; Mongolia |
| Lightweight (73 kg) | Shohei Ono; Japan | Riki Nakaya; Japan | An Chang-rim; South Korea |
| Half-middleweight (81 kg) | Takanori Nagase; Japan | Loïc Pietri; France | Antoine Valois-Fortier; Canada |
| Half-middleweight (81 kg) | Takanori Nagase; Japan | Loïc Pietri; France | Victor Penalber; Brazil |
| Middleweight (90 kg) | Gwak Dong-han; South Korea | Kirill Denisov; Russia | Varlam Liparteliani; Georgia |
| Middleweight (90 kg) | Gwak Dong-han; South Korea | Kirill Denisov; Russia | Mashu Baker; Japan |
| Half-heavyweight (100 kg) | Ryunosuke Haga; Japan | Karl-Richard Frey; Germany | Toma Nikiforov; Belgium |
| Half-heavyweight (100 kg) | Ryunosuke Haga; Japan | Karl-Richard Frey; Germany | Dimitri Peters; Germany |
| Heavyweight (+100 kg) | Teddy Riner; France | Ryu Shichinohe; Japan | Adam Okruashvili; Georgia |
| Heavyweight (+100 kg) | Teddy Riner; France | Ryu Shichinohe; Japan | Iakiv Khammo; Ukraine |
| Team | Japan | South Korea | Georgia |
| Team | Japan | South Korea | Mongolia |

=== Women's events ===
| Event | Gold | Silver | Bronze |
|---|---|---|---|
| Extra-lightweight (48 kg) | Paula Pareto; Argentina | Haruna Asami; Japan | Jeong Bo-kyeong; South Korea |
| Extra-lightweight (48 kg) | Paula Pareto; Argentina | Haruna Asami; Japan | Ami Kondo; Japan |
| Half-lightweight (52 kg) | Misato Nakamura; Japan | Andreea Chițu; Romania | Érika Miranda; Brazil |
| Half-lightweight (52 kg) | Misato Nakamura; Japan | Andreea Chițu; Romania | Darya Skrypnik; Belarus |
| Lightweight (57 kg) | Kaori Matsumoto; Japan | Corina Căprioriu; Romania | Automne Pavia; France |
| Lightweight (57 kg) | Kaori Matsumoto; Japan | Corina Căprioriu; Romania | Sumiya Dorjsuren; Mongolia |
| Half-middleweight (63 kg) | Tina Trstenjak; Slovenia | Clarisse Agbegnenou; France | Tsedevsürengiin Mönkhzayaa; Mongolia |
| Half-middleweight (63 kg) | Tina Trstenjak; Slovenia | Clarisse Agbegnenou; France | Miku Tashiro; Japan |
| Middleweight (70 kg) | Gévrise Émane; France | María Bernabéu; Spain | Fanny Estelle Posvite; France |
| Middleweight (70 kg) | Gévrise Émane; France | María Bernabéu; Spain | Yuri Alvear; Colombia |
| Half-heavyweight (78 kg) | Mami Umeki; Japan | Anamari Velenšek; Slovenia | Luise Malzahn; Germany |
| Half-heavyweight (78 kg) | Mami Umeki; Japan | Anamari Velenšek; Slovenia | Marhinde Verkerk; Netherlands |
| Heavyweight (+78 kg) | Yu Song; China | Megumi Tachimoto; Japan | Kanae Yamabe; Japan |
| Heavyweight (+78 kg) | Yu Song; China | Megumi Tachimoto; Japan | Idalys Ortiz; Cuba |
| Team | Japan | Poland | Germany |
| Team | Japan | Poland | Russia |

== Prize money ==
The sums written are per medalist, bringing the total prizes awarded to 200,000$ for the individual events and 100,000$ for the team events.

| Medal | Individual | | | Team | | |
| Medal | Total | Judoka | Coach | Total | Judoka | Coach |
| Gold | 6,000$ | 4,800$ | 1,200$ | 25,000$ | 20,000$ | 5,000$ |
| Silver | 4,000$ | 3,200$ | 800$ | 15,000$ | 12,000$ | 3,000$ |
| Bronze | 2,000$ | 1,600$ | 400$ | 5,000$ | 4,000$ | 1,000$ |
