= Yeldos Smetov =

Kazakh judoka (born 1992)

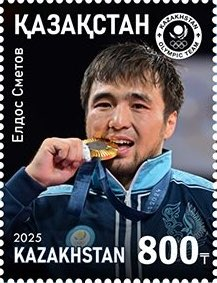
- Smetov at the 2024 Olympics as depicted on a 2025 Kazakh stamp

Personal information
- Native name: Елдос Бақтыбайұлы Сметов
- Born: 9 September 1992 (age 34) Taraz, Jambyl Region, Kazakhstan
- Occupation: Judoka
- Height: 1.67 m (5 ft 6 in)

Sport
- Country: Kazakhstan
- Sport: Judo
- Weight class: ‍–‍60 kg
- Rank: 4th dan black belt
- Coached by: Galymjan Jylkeldiev

Achievements and titles
- Olympic Games: (gold) (2024)
- World Champ.: (gold) (2015)
- Asian Champ.: (gold) (2014, 2016)
Medal record
Men's judo
Representing Kazakhstan
Olympic Games
Gold medal – first place	2024 Paris	‍–‍60 kg
Silver medal – second place	2016 Rio de Janeiro	‍–‍60 kg
Bronze medal – third place	2020 Tokyo	‍–‍60 kg
World Championships
Gold medal – first place	2015 Astana	‍–‍60 kg
Bronze medal – third place	2019 Tokyo	‍–‍60 kg
Bronze medal – third place	2022 Tashkent	‍–‍60 kg
Asian Games
Gold medal – first place	2014 Incheon	‍–‍60 kg
Silver medal – second place	2014 Incheon	Men's team
Silver medal – second place	2026 Aichi‑Nagoya	‍–‍60 kg
Asian Championships
Gold medal – first place	2016 Tashkent	‍–‍60 kg
Bronze medal – third place	2013 Bangkok	‍–‍60 kg
World Masters
Bronze medal – third place	2018 Guangzhou	‍–‍60 kg
IJF Grand Slam
Gold medal – first place	2018 Ekaterinburg	‍–‍60 kg
Silver medal – second place	2019 Paris	‍–‍60 kg
Silver medal – second place	2021 Tashkent	‍–‍60 kg
Bronze medal – third place	2020 Paris	‍–‍60 kg
Bronze medal – third place	2024 Astana	‍–‍60 kg
IJF Grand Prix
Gold medal – first place	2013 Almaty	‍–‍60 kg
Gold medal – first place	2014 Astana	‍–‍60 kg
Gold medal – first place	2015 Budapest	‍–‍60 kg
Gold medal – first place	2018 Hohhot	‍–‍60 kg
Gold medal – first place	2019 Antalya	‍–‍60 kg
Gold medal – first place	2019 Budapest	‍–‍60 kg
Silver medal – second place	2013 Samsun	‍–‍60 kg
Silver medal – second place	2014 Samsun	‍–‍60 kg
Silver medal – second place	2016 Düsseldorf	‍–‍60 kg
Bronze medal – third place	2011 Qingdao	‍–‍60 kg
World Juniors Championships
Gold medal – first place	2010 Agadir	‍–‍55 kg
Bronze medal – third place	2011 Cape Town	‍–‍60 kg
Asian Junior Championships
Gold medal – first place	2010 Bangkok	‍–‍55 kg

Profile at external databases
- IJF: 3712
- JudoInside.com: 66612
- Updated on 30 September 2026

Eldos Baqtybiaūly Smetov (Note: Often transliterated as Yeldos Bakhtybayevich Smetov through a Russified Romanization of Елдос Бахтыбаевич Сметов.) (Kazakh: Елдос Бақтыбайұлы Сметов; born 9 September 1992) is a Kazakh judoka and Olympic champion in 2024 in the under 60 kg weight category. He won gold medals at the 2014 Asian Games the 2015 World Championships, the 2016 Asian Championships, a silver medal at the 2016 Olympics, a bronze medal at the 2020 Olympics in Tokyo and a gold medal at the 2024 Olympics in Paris.

In the 2024 Summer Olympics in Paris, Smetov defeated Luka Mkheidze in the final and won the gold medal, becoming the first ever judoka from Kazakhstan and central asia to win a gold medal.

Smetov also secured gold and bronze medals at the World Juniors Championships in 2010 and 2011, respectively. He joined the adult national team in 2012 and won a bronze at the 2013 Asian Championships in Bangkok, a silver at a Grand Prix stage in Samsun 2013 – a stage of the European Cup in Tbilisi, and gold at an open European Cup in Warsaw. His first coach was Akhmet Zhumagulov.
