= Ludovic Chammartin =

Swiss judoka (born 1985)

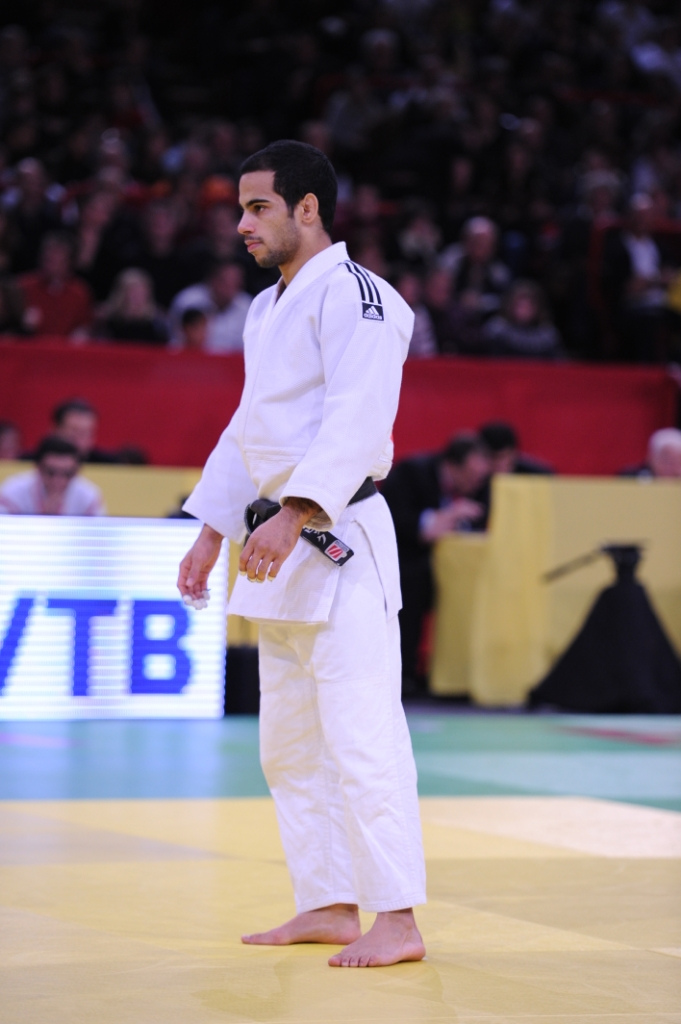
- Ludovic Chammartin in 2011

Personal information
- Born: 31 January 1985 (age 41)
- Occupation: Judoka

Sport
- Country: Switzerland
- Sport: Judo
- Weight class: ‍–‍60 kg

Achievements and titles
- Olympic Games: R16 (2016)
- World Champ.: R16 (2010)
- European Champ.: (silver) (2013)
Medal record
Men's judo
Representing Switzerland
European Games
Bronze medal – third place	2015 Baku	‍–‍60 kg
European Championships
Silver medal – second place	2013 Budapest	‍–‍60 kg
IJF Grand Prix
Bronze medal – third place	2014 Havana	‍–‍60 kg
European U23 Championships
Bronze medal – third place	2006 Moscow	‍–‍60 kg

Profile at external databases
- IJF: 231
- JudoInside.com: 18220
- Updated on 14 November 2022

Ludovic Chammartin (born 31 January 1985) is a Swiss judoka who competes in the men's 60 kg category. At the 2012 Summer Olympics, he was defeated in the second round. At the 2016 Summer Olympics, he was eliminated in the third round by Diyorbek Urozboev.
