= 2024 World Judo Championships – Men's 66 kg =

Judo competition

Judo Men's 66 kg at the 2024 World Judo Championships
- Venue: Mubadala Arena
- Location: Abu Dhabi, United Arab Emirates
- Date: 20 May 2024
- Competitors: 58 from 44 nations
- Total prize money: €57,000

Medalists
gold medal	Ryoma Tanaka (1st title)	Japan
silver medal	Takeshi Takeoka	Japan
bronze medal	Luukas Saha	Finland
bronze medal	Vazha Margvelashvili	Georgia

Competition at external databases
- Links: IJF • JudoInside

The Men's 66 kg event at the 2024 World Judo Championships was held at the Mubadala Arena in Abu Dhabi, United Arab Emirates on 20 May 2024.

== Results ==
=== Finals ===
Semi-finals
(Italy) Matteo Piras	00
(Japan) Ryoma Tanaka	01
(Tajikistan) Nurali Emomali	00 (yellow card)
(Japan) Takeshi Takeoka	10 (yellow card)

Final
(Japan) Ryoma Tanaka	02
(Japan) Takeshi Takeoka	00 (yellow card)

=== Repechage ===
Repechage
(Finland) Luukas Saha	w/o
(South Korea) An Ba-ul
(Mongolia) Battogtokhyn Erkhembayar	00
(Georgia (country)) Vazha Margvelashvili	02 (yellow card)

Bronze medal
(Finland) Luukas Saha	10
(Tajikistan) Nurali Emomali	00
(Georgia (country)) Vazha Margvelashvili	10
(Italy) Matteo Piras	00 (yellow card)

=== Pool A ===
First round
(Canada) Julien Frascadore	00
(France) Daikii Bouba	10
(Bulgaria) Yanislav Gerchev	01 (yellow card)
(Zambia) Steven Mungandu	00
(Algeria) Kais Moudetere	00 (yellow card)
(Finland) Luukas Saha	10 (yellow card)
(Spain) Alberto Gaitero	10
(Colombia) Juan Hernández	00
(Tajikistan) Obid Dzhebov	02 (yellow card)
(United States) Ari Berliner	00
Yago Abuladze	01
(Italy) Matteo Piras	11 (yellow card)
(Egypt) Ahmed Abdelrahman	00
(Uzbekistan) Mukhriddin Tilovov	10 (yellow card)

Round of 32
(Moldova) Denis Vieru	00
(France) Daikii Bouba	01
(Bulgaria) Yanislav Gerchev	00
(Finland) Luukas Saha	10
(Spain) Alberto Gaitero	00
(Tajikistan) Obid Dzhebov	01 (yellow card)
(Italy) Matteo Piras	01
(Uzbekistan) Mukhriddin Tilovov	00 (yellow card)

Round of 16
(France) Daikii Bouba	00 (yellow card)
(Finland) Luukas Saha	01
(Tajikistan) Obid Dzhebov	00
(Italy) Matteo Piras	01

Quarter-finals
(Finland) Luukas Saha	00
(Italy) Matteo Piras	11

=== Pool B ===
First round
(Serbia) Strahinja Bunčić	00
(Turkmenistan) Serdar Rahymow	11 (yellow card)
(Kazakhstan) Gusman Kyrgyzbayev	01
(Israel) Tal Flicker	10
(Germany) Martin Setz	00
(Japan) Ryoma Tanaka	10
(South Korea) An Ba-ul	10
(Estonia) Viljar Lipard	00
(Peru) Juan Postigos	00 (yellow card)
(Latvia) Anthony De Angelis	10
(Ukraine) Mykyta Holoborodko	02 (yellow card)
(Central African Republic) Jason Zacko Ngawili	00 (yellow card)

Round of 32
(Brazil) Willian Lima	10
(Turkmenistan) Serdar Rahymow	00
(Israel) Tal Flicker	00 (yellow card)
(Japan) Ryoma Tanaka	01
(Azerbaijan) Yashar Najafov	00
(South Korea) An Ba-ul	10
(Latvia) Anthony De Angelis	01 (yellow card)
(Ukraine) Mykyta Holoborodko	02

Round of 16
(Brazil) Willian Lima	00
(Japan) Ryoma Tanaka	10
(South Korea) An Ba-ul	10 (yellow card)
(Ukraine) Mykyta Holoborodko	00

Quarter-finals
(Japan) Ryoma Tanaka	w/o
(South Korea) An Ba-ul

=== Pool C ===
First round
(Venezuela) Willis García	00
(Turkmenistan) Hekim Agamämmedow	10
(Estonia) Oscar Pertelson	00 (yellow card)
(Angola) Edmilson Pedro	01
(Hungary) Bence Pongrácz	10
(Cyprus) Georgios Balarjishvili	00
(Tajikistan) Nurali Emomali	11 (yellow card)
(Ukraine) Bogdan Iadov	00
(Egypt) Mohamed Abdelmawgoud	02 (yellow card)
(Azerbaijan) Kamran Suleymanov	00
(Ecuador) Lenin Preciado	00
(Morocco) Abderrahmane Boushita	10
(France) Walide Khyar	10 (yellow card)
(Kazakhstan) Zhanarys Rakhmetkali	00

Round of 32
(Mongolia) Battogtokhyn Erkhembayar	02
(Turkmenistan) Hekim Agamämmedow	01 (yellow card)
(Angola) Edmilson Pedro	01
(Hungary) Bence Pongrácz	10 (yellow card)
(Tajikistan) Nurali Emomali	11
(Egypt) Mohamed Abdelmawgoud	00
(Morocco) Abderrahmane Boushita	00
(France) Walide Khyar	10

Round of 16
(Mongolia) Battogtokhyn Erkhembayar	01 (yellow card)
(Hungary) Bence Pongrácz	00
(Tajikistan) Nurali Emomali	02 (yellow card)
(France) Walide Khyar	00 (yellow card)

Quarter-finals
(Mongolia) Battogtokhyn Erkhembayar	00
(Tajikistan) Nurali Emomali	02

=== Pool D ===
First round
(Italy) Elios Manzi	01
(Slovakia) Matej Poliak	00 (yellow card)
(Bahrain) Ramazan Kodzhakov	00
(Moldova) Radu Izvoreanu	10 (yellow card)
(Cuba) Orlando Polanco	00 (yellow card)
(Japan) Takeshi Takeoka	01
Murad Chopanov	10 (yellow card)
(United Arab Emirates) Bayanmönkhiin Narmandakh	00 (yellow card)
(Turkey) Muhammed Demirel	02
(Kyrgyzstan) Kubanychbek Aibek Uulu	00
(Uzbekistan) Sardor Nurillaev	11 (yellow card)
(Gabon) Fernand Nkero	00

Round of 32
(Mongolia) Yondonperenlein Baskhüü	01
(Italy) Elios Manzi	00
(Moldova) Radu Izvoreanu	00 (yellow card)
(Japan) Takeshi Takeoka	01 (yellow card)
(Georgia (country)) Vazha Margvelashvili	10 (yellow card)
Murad Chopanov	00
(Turkey) Muhammed Demirel	00
(Uzbekistan) Sardor Nurillaev	10 (yellow card)

Round of 16
(Mongolia) Yondonperenlein Baskhüü	00
(Japan) Takeshi Takeoka	10
(Georgia (country)) Vazha Margvelashvili	10 (yellow card)
(Uzbekistan) Sardor Nurillaev	01

Quarter-finals
(Japan) Takeshi Takeoka	10
(Georgia (country)) Vazha Margvelashvili	00

== Prize money ==
The sums listed bring the total prizes awarded to €57,000 for the individual event.

Medal	Total	Judoka	Coach
Gold	€26,000	€20,800	€5,200
Silver	€15,000	€12,000	€3,000
Bronze	€8,000	€6,400	€1,600
