= 2025 World Judo Championships – Men's 66 kg =

Judo competition

Judo Men's 66 kg at the 2025 World Judo Championships
- Venue: László Papp Budapest Sports Arena
- Location: Budapest, Hungary
- Date: 14 June 2025
- Competitors: 50 from 38 nations
- Total prize money: €57,000

Medalists
gold medal	Takeshi Takeoka (1st title)	Japan
silver medal	Nurali Emomali	Tajikistan
bronze medal	Obid Dzhebov	Tajikistan
bronze medal	Hifumi Abe	Japan

Competition at external databases
- Links: IJF • JudoInside

The 2025 World Judo Championships was held at the László Papp Budapest Sports Arena in Budapest, Hungary on 14 June 2025.

== Results ==
=== Finals ===
Semi-finals
(Japan) Takeshi Takeoka	100
(Cuba) Orlando Polanco	000
(Tajikistan) Nurali Emomali	010 (yellow card)
(Tajikistan) Obid Dzhebov	000 (yellow card)

Final
(Japan) Takeshi Takeoka	001 (yellow card)
(Tajikistan) Nurali Emomali	000 (yellow card)

=== Repechage ===
Repechage
(France) Walide Khyar	001 (yellow card)
(United Arab Emirates) Bayanmönkhiin Narmandakh	000
(Kazakhstan) Gusman Kyrgyzbayev	000
(Japan) Hifumi Abe	001 (yellow card)

Bronze medal
(France) Walide Khyar	000 (yellow card)
(Tajikistan) Obid Dzhebov	020 (yellow card)
(Japan) Hifumi Abe	100
(Cuba) Orlando Polanco	000

=== Pool A ===
First round
(Turkmenistan) Hekim Agamämmedow	011 (yellow card)
(Uzbekistan) Zamohshari Bekmurodov	000
(Azerbaijan) Ruslan Pashayev	001 (yellow card)
(Brazil) Ronald Lima	000
(Mongolia) Battogtokhyn Erkhembayar	100 (yellow card)
(Lithuania) Simas Polikevičius	000
(Portugal) Miguel Nery Gago	000
(United States) Ari Berliner	001
(Bulgaria) Boyan Yotov	100
(Montenegro) Jusuf Nurković	010

Round of 32
(Japan) Takeshi Takeoka	020
(Turkmenistan) Hekim Agamämmedow	000 (yellow card)
(Azerbaijan) Ruslan Pashayev	011
(Italy) Matteo Piras	000
(France) Walide Khyar	100 (yellow card)
(Mongolia) Battogtokhyn Erkhembayar	000
(United States) Ari Berliner	101 (yellow card)
(Bulgaria) Boyan Yotov	000

Round of 16
(Japan) Takeshi Takeoka	001
(Azerbaijan) Ruslan Pashayev	000
(France) Walide Khyar	011 (yellow card)
(United States) Ari Berliner	000

Quarter-finals
(Japan) Takeshi Takeoka	101 (yellow card)
(France) Walide Khyar	000 (yellow card)

=== Pool B ===
First round
(Hungary) Bence Pongrácz	100
(China) Zhang Haiyang	000
(Cyprus) Georgios Balarjishvili	011
(Serbia) Strahinja Bunčić	110 (yellow card)
(United Arab Emirates) Bayanmönkhiin Narmandakh	100 (yellow card)
(Senegal) Mouhamedou Mboup	000
(Mexico) Robin Jara	020
(Ecuador) Lenin Preciado	000

Round of 32
(International Judo Federation) Murad Chopanov	011
(Hungary) Bence Pongrácz	001 (yellow card)
(Serbia) Strahinja Bunčić	000 (yellow card)
(Cuba) Orlando Polanco	001
(France) Daikii Bouba	000
(United Arab Emirates) Bayanmönkhiin Narmandakh	001 (yellow card)
(Mexico) Robin Jara	000
(Spain) David García Torné	100

Round of 16
(International Judo Federation) Murad Chopanov	000
(Cuba) Orlando Polanco	100
(United Arab Emirates) Bayanmönkhiin Narmandakh	002 (yellow card)
(Spain) David García Torné	000 (yellow card)

Quarter-finals
(Cuba) Orlando Polanco	010
(United Arab Emirates) Bayanmönkhiin Narmandakh	000 (yellow card)

=== Pool C ===
First round
(Spain) Adrián Nieto	100
(Turkmenistan) Toýly Myradow	000
(Estonia) Viljar Lipard	000
(Mongolia) Yondonperenlein Baskhüü	010 (yellow card)
(Germany) Martin Setz	000 (yellow card)
(China) Xue Ziyang	100 (yellow card)
(Turkey) Muhammed Demirel	100
(Zambia) Steven Mungandu	000 (yellow card)

Round of 32
(Tajikistan) Nurali Emomali	100 (yellow card)
(Spain) Adrián Nieto	000 (yellow card)
(Mongolia) Yondonperenlein Baskhüü	000 (yellow card)
(Georgia (country)) Vazha Margvelashvili	100 (yellow card)
(Kazakhstan) Gusman Kyrgyzbayev	100 (yellow card)
(China) Xue Ziyang	000
(Turkey) Muhammed Demirel	000
(Israel) Guy Gutman	102

Round of 16
(Tajikistan) Nurali Emomali	020 (yellow card)
(Georgia (country)) Vazha Margvelashvili	000 (yellow card)
(Kazakhstan) Gusman Kyrgyzbayev	100
(Israel) Guy Gutman	000 (yellow card)

Quarter-finals
(Tajikistan) Nurali Emomali	100 (yellow card)
(Kazakhstan) Gusman Kyrgyzbayev	000

=== Pool D ===
First round
(Hungary) Bálint Gombás	002 (yellow card)
(Latvia) Anthony De Angelis	001
(South Korea) Kim Chann-yeong	011 (yellow card)
(Morocco) Abderrahmane Boushita	001
(El Salvador) Diego Calix	000
(Italy) Elios Manzi	011 (yellow card)
(Finland) Luukas Saha	100
(United States) Jacob Yang	000
(Uzbekistan) Azizbek Ortikov	020 (yellow card)
(Kyrgyzstan) Erbol Abasbekov	000 (yellow card)

Round of 32
(Tajikistan) Obid Dzhebov	110
(Hungary) Bálint Gombás	000 (yellow card)
(South Korea) Kim Chann-yeong	000
(International Judo Federation) Ramazan Abdulaev	100
(Japan) Hifumi Abe	011
(Italy) Elios Manzi	000
(Finland) Luukas Saha	100 (yellow card)
(Uzbekistan) Azizbek Ortikov	000

Round of 16
(Tajikistan) Obid Dzhebov	100 (yellow card)
(International Judo Federation) Ramazan Abdulaev	000
(Japan) Hifumi Abe	100
(Finland) Luukas Saha	000

Quarter-finals
(Tajikistan) Obid Dzhebov	100 (yellow card)
(Japan) Hifumi Abe	000

== Prize money ==
The sums listed bring the total prizes awarded to €57,000 for the individual event.

Medal	Total	Judoka	Coach
Gold	€26,000	€20,800	€5,200
Silver	€15,000	€12,000	€3,000
Bronze	€8,000	€6,400	€1,600
