= 2018 World Judo Championships – Men's 66 kg =

Judo competition

Judo Men's 66 kg at the 2018 World Judo Championships
- Venue: National Gymnastics Arena
- Location: Baku, Azerbaijan
- Dates: 21 September
- Competitors: 75 from 63 nations
- Total prize money: 57,000€

Medalists
gold medal	Hifumi Abe (2nd title)	Japan
silver medal	Yerlan Serikzhanov	Kazakhstan
bronze medal	An Baul	South Korea
bronze medal	Georgii Zantaraia	Ukraine

Competition at external databases
- Links: IJF • JudoInside

The Men's 66 kg competition at the 2018 World Judo Championships was held on 21 September 2018.

== Results ==
=== Finals ===
Semi-finals
(Israel) Tal Flicker	00
(Kazakhstan) Yerlan Serikzhanov	10
(Japan) Hifumi Abe	01
(South Korea) An Baul	00

Final
(Kazakhstan) Yerlan Serikzhanov	00
(Japan) Hifumi Abe	10

=== Repechage ===
Repechage
(Brazil) Daniel Cargnin	01
(Mongolia) Kherlen Ganbold	00

Third place
(Brazil) Daniel Cargnin	00
(South Korea) An Baul	01

Repechage
(Ukraine) Georgii Zantaraia	01
(Russia) Mikhail Pulyaev	00

Third place
(Ukraine) Georgii Zantaraia	01
(Israel) Tal Flicker	00

=== Pool A ===
Preliminary round fights

	Score	
Sardor Nurillaev (Uzbekistan)	10–00	(Democratic Republic of the Congo) Rodrick Kuku
Mohamed Abdelmawgoud (Egypt)	10–00	(Zimbabwe) Brian Chiminya
Bektur Rysmambetov (Kyrgyzstan)	11–01	(China) Wu Zhiqiang

First round
(Israel) Tal Flicker	01
(Uzbekistan) Sardor Nurillaev	00
(Botswana) Gavin Mogopa	00
(Slovenia) Adrian Gomboc	10
(Cuba) Osniel Solís	01
(Iraq) Mohammed Al-Saedi	00
(Qatar) Ayoub El-Idrissi	00
(Belgium) Kenneth Van Gansbeke	10
(Brazil) Daniel Cargnin	11
(Bosnia and Herzegovina) Petar Zadro	01
(Egypt) Mohamed Abdelmawgoud	00
(Azerbaijan) Nijat Shikhalizada	10
(Czech Republic) Pavel Petřikov	01
(Kyrgyzstan) Bektur Rysmambetov	00
(Belarus) Dzmitry Minkou	00
(Serbia) Strahinja Bunčić	01

Second round
(Israel) Tal Flicker	01
(Slovenia) Adrian Gomboc	00
(Cuba) Osniel Solís	01
(Belgium) Kenneth Van Gansbeke	00
(Brazil) Daniel Cargnin	10
(Azerbaijan) Nijat Shikhalizada	01
(Czech Republic) Pavel Petřikov	10
(Serbia) Strahinja Bunčić	00

Third round
(Israel) Tal Flicker	01
(Cuba) Osniel Solís	00
(Brazil) Daniel Cargnin	10
(Czech Republic) Pavel Petřikov	00

Quarterfinals
(Israel) Tal Flicker	01
(Brazil) Daniel Cargnin	00

=== Pool B ===
Preliminary round fights

	Score	
Navruz Karimzod (Tajikistan)	00–01	(Peru) Juan Postigos
Marko Gusić (Montenegro)	10–00	(Malawi) Dylesi Wyson

First round
(Israel) Baruch Shmailov	11
(France) Daniel Jean	00
(Mozambique) Artur Carlos	00
(Kazakhstan) Yerlan Serikzhanov	10
(Moldova) Vadim Bunescu	10
(Luxembourg) Tom Schmit	00
(Peru) Juan Postigos	00
(Ukraine) Bogdan Iadov	10
(Mongolia) Kherlen Ganbold	01
(Turkey) Sinan Sandal	00
(Dominican Republic) Wander Mateo	00
(Morocco) Abderrahmane Boushita	10
(Montenegro) Marko Gusić	00
(Republic of Ireland) Nathon Burns	10
(Saudi Arabia) Abdulaziz Al-Bashi	00
(Hungary) Zsolt Gorjánácz	01

Second round
(Israel) Baruch Shmailov	00
(Kazakhstan) Yerlan Serikzhanov	10
(Moldova) Vadim Bunescu	10
(Ukraine) Bogdan Iadov	00
(Mongolia) Kherlen Ganbold	01
(Morocco) Abderrahmane Boushita	00
(Republic of Ireland) Nathon Burns	10
(Hungary) Zsolt Gorjánácz	00

Third round
(Kazakhstan) Yerlan Serikzhanov	10
(Moldova) Vadim Bunescu	00
(Mongolia) Kherlen Ganbold	01
(Republic of Ireland) Nathon Burns	00

Quarterfinals
(Kazakhstan) Yerlan Serikzhanov	11
(Mongolia) Kherlen Ganbold	01

=== Pool C ===
Preliminary round fights

	Score	
Matteo Medves (Italy)	10–00	(United States) Ryan Vargas
Mohammed Salem (Yemen)	00–10	(Poland) Patryk Wawrzyczek
Indra Shrestha (Nepal)	00–10	(Egypt) Ahmed Abdelrahman

First round
(Japan) Hifumi Abe	10
(Haiti) Gerard Cadet	00
(Italy) Matteo Medves	10
(Togo) Adebayo Olympio	00
(New Zealand) James Entwistle	00
(Moldova) Denis Vieru	10
(Mozambique) Kevin Loforte	10
(Slovakia) Matej Poliak	01
(Ukraine) Georgii Zantaraia	10
(Poland) Patryk Wawrzyczek	00
(Zambia) Mathews Punza	00
(Philippines) Shugen Nakano	10
(Australia) Nathan Katz	00
(Egypt) Ahmed Abdelrahman	10
(Tajikistan) Yokubdzhon Bokiev	10
(Malta) Jeremy Saywell	00

Second round
(Japan) Hifumi Abe	10
(Italy) Matteo Medves	00
(Moldova) Denis Vieru	10
(Mozambique) Kevin Loforte	00
(Ukraine) Georgii Zantaraia	10
(Philippines) Shugen Nakano	00
(Egypt) Ahmed Abdelrahman	10
(Tajikistan) Yokubdzhon Bokiev	00

Third round
(Japan) Hifumi Abe	01
(Moldova) Denis Vieru	00
(Ukraine) Georgii Zantaraia	10
(Egypt) Ahmed Abdelrahman	00

Quarterfinals
(Japan) Hifumi Abe	10
(Ukraine) Georgii Zantaraia	00

=== Pool D ===
Preliminary round fights

	Score	
Charles Chibana (Brazil)	10–00	(Spain) Alberto Gaitero
Ismael Alhassane (Niger)	00–10	(Costa Rica) Ian Sancho
Diogo César (Guinea-Bissau)	00–10	(Morocco) Imad Bassou

First round
(Georgia (country)) Vazha Margvelashvili	10
(Benin) Auguste Daga	00
(Germany) Sebastian Seidl	01
(Brazil) Charles Chibana	00
(Guyana) Darren Elcock	00
(Russia) Mikhail Pulyaev	10
(Botswana) Letlhogile Tsheko	00
(Albania) Indrit Cullhaj	11
(South Korea) An Baul	10
(Costa Rica) Ian Sancho	00
(Kyrgyzstan) Artur Te	10
(Portugal) João Crisóstomo	00
(Morocco) Imad Bassou	10
(Afghanistan) Abdul Fazli	00
(Belarus) Dzmitry Shershan	01
(Montenegro) Jusuf Nurković	00

Second round
(Georgia (country)) Vazha Margvelashvili	00
(Germany) Sebastian Seidl	10
(Russia) Mikhail Pulyaev	10
(Albania) Indrit Cullhaj	00
(South Korea) An Baul	01
(Kyrgyzstan) Artur Te	00
(Morocco) Imad Bassou	01
(Belarus) Dzmitry Shershan	11

Third round
(Germany) Sebastian Seidl	00
(Russia) Mikhail Pulyaev	10
(South Korea) An Baul	10
(Belarus) Dzmitry Shershan	00

Quarterfinals
(Russia) Mikhail Pulyaev	00
(South Korea) An Baul	11

== Prize money ==
The sums listed bring the total prizes awarded to 57,000€ for the individual event.

Medal	Total	Judoka	Coach
Gold	26,000€	20,800€	5,200€
Silver	15,000€	12,000€	3,000€
Bronze	8,000€	6,400€	1,600€
