= 2026 European Judo Championships – Men's 66 kg =

Judo competition

Judo Men's 66 kg at the 2026 European Judo Championships
- Venue: Olympic Palace
- Location: Tbilisi, Georgia
- Date: 16 April 2026
- Competitors: 28 from 21 nations

Medalists
gold medal	Murad Chopanov (1st title)	Russia
silver medal	Luukas Saha	Finland
bronze medal	Walide Khyar	France
bronze medal	Turan Bayramov	Azerbaijan

Competition at external databases
- Links: IJF • JudoInside

The men's 66 kg event at the 2026 European Judo Championships was held at the Olympic Palace in Tbilisi, Georgia on 16 April 2026.

== Results ==
=== Finals ===
Semi-finals
(Finland) Luukas Saha	001
(Russia) Abdullakh Parchiev	000 (yellow card)
(France) Walide Khyar	010
(Russia) Murad Chopanov	021

Final
(Finland) Luukas Saha	000 (yellow card)
(Russia) Murad Chopanov	001

=== Repechage ===
Repechage
(Armenia) Davit Abrahamyan	010
(France) Daikii Bouba	000
(Moldova) Radu Izvoreanu	010 (yellow card)
(Azerbaijan) Turan Bayramov	011 (yellow card)

Bronze medal
(Armenia) Davit Abrahamyan	000 (yellow card)
(France) Walide Khyar	101
(Azerbaijan) Turan Bayramov	100 (yellow card)
(Russia) Abdullakh Parchiev	000

=== Pool A ===
First round
(United Kingdom) Charlie Young	001
(Serbia) Marko Jorgić	002 (yellow card)
(Spain) Adrián Nieto	001 (yellow card)
(Moldova) Denis Vieru	000
(Armenia) Davit Abrahamyan	001 (yellow card)
(Montenegro) Jusuf Nurković	000

Round of 16
(Finland) Luukas Saha	100
(Serbia) Marko Jorgić	000
(Spain) Adrián Nieto	000
(Armenia) Davit Abrahamyan	100

Quarter-finals
(Finland) Luukas Saha	100 (yellow card)
(Armenia) Davit Abrahamyan	000 (yellow card)

=== Pool B ===
First round
(Latvia) Anthony De Angelis	000 (yellow card)
(Hungary) Bence Pongrácz	100
(Spain) David García Torné	100
(Cyprus) Georgios Balarjishvili	000
(Russia) Abdullakh Parchiev	113
(Bulgaria) Boyan Yotov	000

Round of 16
(France) Daikii Bouba	100
(Hungary) Bence Pongrácz	002
(Spain) David García Torné	000 (yellow card)
(Russia) Abdullakh Parchiev	010 (yellow card)

Quarter-finals
(France) Daikii Bouba	000
(Russia) Abdullakh Parchiev	110

=== Pool C ===
First round
(Croatia) Dani Klačar	100
(Georgia (country)) Vazha Margvelashvili	000 (yellow card)
(Italy) Valerio Accogli	010 (yellow card)
(Serbia) Matija Jeremić	000
(Israel) Matan Kokolayev	000
(Moldova) Radu Izvoreanu	011

Round of 16
(France) Walide Khyar	010 (yellow card)
(Croatia) Dani Klačar	000
(Italy) Valerio Accogli	000
(Moldova) Radu Izvoreanu	020 (yellow card)

Quarter-finals
(France) Walide Khyar	100 (yellow card)
(Moldova) Radu Izvoreanu	000

=== Pool D ===
First round
(Lithuania) Simas Polikevičius	000
(Portugal) Miguel Nery Gago	100 (yellow card)
(Italy) Elios Manzi	001
(Cyprus) Petros Christodoulides	000 (yellow card)
(Azerbaijan) Turan Bayramov	011 (yellow card)
(Germany) Nicolas Kunze	000 (yellow card)

Round of 16
(Russia) Murad Chopanov	002 (yellow card)
(Portugal) Miguel Nery Gago	000 (yellow card)
(Italy) Elios Manzi	000 (yellow card)
(Azerbaijan) Turan Bayramov	001

Quarter-finals
(Russia) Murad Chopanov	100 (yellow card)
(Azerbaijan) Turan Bayramov	000
