= 2021 World Judo Championships – Men's 66 kg =

Judo competition

Judo Men's 66 kg at the 2021 World Judo Championships
- Venue: László Papp Budapest Sports Arena
- Location: Budapest, Hungary
- Date: 7 June
- Competitors: 59 from 49 nations
- Total prize money: 57,000€

Medalists
gold medal	Joshiro Maruyama (2nd title)	Japan
silver medal	Manuel Lombardo	Italy
bronze medal	Yakub Shamilov
bronze medal	Yondonperenlein Baskhüü	Mongolia

Competition at external databases
- Links: IJF • JudoInside

The Men's 66 kg competition at the 2021 World Judo Championships was held on 7 June 2021.

== Results ==
=== Finals ===
Semi-finals
(Italy) Manuel Lombardo	01
(Kazakhstan) Yeldos Zhumakanov	00
(Azerbaijan) Orkhan Safarov	00
(Japan) Joshiro Maruyama	01

Final
(Italy) Manuel Lombardo	00
(Japan) Joshiro Maruyama	01

=== Repechage ===
Repechage
Yakub Shamilov	10
(Belarus) Dzmitry Minkou	00

Third place
Yakub Shamilov	01
(Azerbaijan) Orkhan Safarov	00

Repechage
(France) Kilian Le Blouch	00
(Mongolia) Yondonperenlein Baskhüü	01

Third place
(Mongolia) Yondonperenlein Baskhüü	10
(Kazakhstan) Yeldos Zhumakanov	00

=== Pool A ===
First round
(Saudi Arabia) Abdulaziz Al-Bashi	00
(Germany) Sebastian Seidl	01
(Ukraine) Yevhen Honcharko	00
(Egypt) Ahmed Abdelrahman	10
(Haiti) Mackensy Laurent	00
(Cuba) Orlando Polanco	10
Yakub Shamilov	10
(United States) Ari Berliner	00
(Bulgaria) Bozhidar Temelkov	00
(Argentina) Tal Almog	10
(Niger) Ismael Alhassane	00
(Belgium) Kenneth Van Gansbeke	10
(Azerbaijan) Nijat Shikhalizada	01
(Romania) Lucian Borş Dumitrescu	10

Second round
(Italy) Manuel Lombardo	01
(Germany) Sebastian Seidl	00
(Egypt) Ahmed Abdelrahman	00
(Cuba) Orlando Polanco	10
Yakub Shamilov	10
(Argentina) Tal Almog	00
(Belgium) Kenneth Van Gansbeke	00
(Romania) Lucian Borş Dumitrescu	01

Third round
(Italy) Manuel Lombardo	01
(Cuba) Orlando Polanco	00
Yakub Shamilov	10
(Romania) Lucian Borş Dumitrescu	00

Quarterfinals
(Italy) Manuel Lombardo	01
Yakub Shamilov	00

=== Pool B ===
First round
(Morocco) Imad Bassou	01
(Colombia) Juan Hernández	00
(Philippines) Shugen Nakano	00
(Australia) Nathan Katz	10
(Slovenia) Adrian Gomboc	00
(Kazakhstan) Yeldos Zhumakanov	10
Miad Nosrati	00
(Belarus) Dzmitry Minkou	10
(Togo) Adebayo Olympio	00
(South Korea) Kim Chann-yeong	10
(Moldova) Radu Izvoreanu	01
(India) Jasleen Saini	00

Second round
(Mongolia) Ganboldyn Kherlen	10
(Morocco) Imad Bassou	00
(Australia) Nathan Katz	00
(Kazakhstan) Yeldos Zhumakanov	10
(Spain) Alberto Gaitero Martin	00
(Belarus) Dzmitry Minkou	10
(South Korea) Kim Chann-yeong	10
(Moldova) Radu Izvoreanu	00

Third round
(Mongolia) Ganboldyn Kherlen	00
(Kazakhstan) Yeldos Zhumakanov	01
(Belarus) Dzmitry Minkou	01
(South Korea) Kim Chann-yeong	00

Quarterfinals
(Kazakhstan) Yeldos Zhumakanov	01
(Belarus) Dzmitry Minkou	00

=== Pool C ===
First round
(Dominican Republic) Wander Mateo	00
(Moldova) Vadim Bunescu	10
(France) Kilian Le Blouch	10
(Portugal) João Crisóstomo	00
(Ukraine) Georgii Zantaraia	00
(Slovakia) Matej Poliak	01
(Uzbekistan) Sardor Nurillaev	01
(Albania) Indrit Cullhaj	00
(Azerbaijan) Orkhan Safarov	10
(Republic of Ireland) Nathon Burns	00
(Qatar) Ayoub El-Idrissi	00
(Algeria) Wail Ezzine	10
(Guinea-Bissau) Diogo César	00
(Montenegro) Jusuf Nurković	01

Second round
(Georgia (country)) Vazha Margvelashvili	00
(Moldova) Vadim Bunescu	10
(France) Kilian Le Blouch	10
(Slovakia) Matej Poliak	00
(Uzbekistan) Sardor Nurillaev	00
(Azerbaijan) Orkhan Safarov	10
(Algeria) Wail Ezzine	01
(Montenegro) Jusuf Nurković	00

Third round
(Moldova) Vadim Bunescu	00
(France) Kilian Le Blouch	10
(Azerbaijan) Orkhan Safarov	01
(Algeria) Wail Ezzine	00

Quarterfinals
(France) Kilian Le Blouch	00
(Azerbaijan) Orkhan Safarov	01

=== Pool D ===
First round
(Morocco) Abderrahmane Boushita	10
(Zambia) Steven Mungandu	00
(Israel) Tal Flicker	01
(Serbia) Strahinja Bunčić	00
(Spain) Daniel Pérez	10
(Cyprus) Georgios Balarjishvili	00
(Mongolia) Yondonperenlein Baskhüü	10
(Costa Rica) Ian Sancho	00
(Egypt) Mohamed Abdelmawgoud	10
(Peru) Juan Postigos	00
Murad Chopanov	01
(Tajikistan) Shahboz Saidaburorov	00

Second round
(Japan) Joshiro Maruyama	01
(Morocco) Abderrahmane Boushita	00
(Israel) Tal Flicker	10
(Spain) Daniel Pérez	00
(Mongolia) Yondonperenlein Baskhüü	01
(Egypt) Mohamed Abdelmawgoud	00
(Haiti) Gerard Cadet	00
Murad Chopanov	10

Third round
(Japan) Joshiro Maruyama	01
(Israel) Tal Flicker	00
(Mongolia) Yondonperenlein Baskhüü	10
Murad Chopanov	00

Quarterfinals
(Japan) Joshiro Maruyama	10
(Mongolia) Yondonperenlein Baskhüü	00

== Prize money ==
The sums listed bring the total prizes awarded to 57,000€ for the individual event.

Medal	Total	Judoka	Coach
Gold	26,000€	20,800€	5,200€
Silver	15,000€	12,000€	3,000€
Bronze	8,000€	6,400€	1,600€
