= 2026 World Judo Championships – Men's 66 kg =

Judo competition

Judo Men's 66 kg at the 2026 World Judo Championships
- Venue: National Gymnastics Arena
- Location: Baku, Azerbaijan
- Date: 5 October 2026
- Competitors: 48 from 36 nations
- Total prize money: €57,000

Medalists
gold medal	Hifumi Abe (5th title)	Japan
silver medal	David García Torné	Spain
bronze medal	Denis Vieru	Moldova
bronze medal	Takeshi Takeoka	Japan

Competition at external databases
- Links: IJF

The men's 66 kg event at the 2026 World Judo Championships was held at the National Gymnastics Arena in Baku, Azerbaijan on 5 October 2026.

== Results ==
=== Finals ===
Semi-finals
(Japan) Takeshi Takeoka	000 (yellow card)
(Japan) Hifumi Abe	002
(Moldova) Denis Vieru	000 (yellow card)
(Spain) David García Torné	001 (yellow card)

Final
(Japan) Hifumi Abe	100 (yellow card)
(Spain) David García Torné	000 (yellow card)

=== Repechage ===
Repechage
(Russia) Murad Chopanov	002 (yellow card)
(Italy) Valerio Accogli	001 (yellow card)
(Tajikistan) Nurali Emomali	000
(Mongolia) Yondonperenlein Baskhüü	001

Bronze medal
(Russia) Murad Chopanov	000
(Moldova) Denis Vieru	001
(Mongolia) Yondonperenlein Baskhüü	000
(Japan) Takeshi Takeoka	020

=== Pool A ===
First round
(Kazakhstan) Nurkanat Serikbayev	010
(Algeria) Kais Moudetere	000
(Cyprus) Georgios Balarjishvili	010 (yellow card)
(Chinese Taipei) Lin Chong-you	100
(Bulgaria) Boyan Yotov	000 (yellow card)
(Croatia) Dani Klačar	100
(Finland) Luukas Saha	100 (yellow card)
(Azerbaijan) Turan Bayramov	011 (yellow card)

Round of 32
(Japan) Takeshi Takeoka	011 (yellow card)
(Kazakhstan) Nurkanat Serikbayev	000 (yellow card)
(Chinese Taipei) Lin Chong-you	010
(Mongolia) Ölziibayaryn Byambasüren	101
(Russia) Murad Chopanov	100
(Croatia) Dani Klačar	000
(Finland) Luukas Saha	010
(Moldova) Radu Izvoreanu	001

Round of 16
(Japan) Takeshi Takeoka	101
(Mongolia) Ölziibayaryn Byambasüren	001
(Russia) Murad Chopanov	100
(Finland) Luukas Saha	000

Quarter-finals
(Japan) Takeshi Takeoka	001 (yellow card)
(Russia) Murad Chopanov	000

=== Pool B ===
First round
(Turkmenistan) Serdar Rahimov	001
(Spain) Adrián Nieto	000 (yellow card)
(Uzbekistan) Azizbek Ortikov	000
(Italy) Valerio Accogli	001 (yellow card)
(France) Kelvin Ray	102
(United States) Ari Berliner	000 (yellow card)
(United Kingdom) Michael Fryer	000
(Portugal) Miguel Nery Gago	100

Round of 32
(Azerbaijan) Ruslan Pashayev	010
(Turkmenistan) Serdar Rahimov	000 (yellow card)
(Italy) Valerio Accogli	100 (yellow card)
(Ukraine) Vadym Chernov	000
(Japan) Hifumi Abe	100
(France) Kelvin Ray	000
(Portugal) Miguel Nery Gago	000
(Serbia) Marko Jorgić	020 (yellow card)

Round of 16
(Azerbaijan) Ruslan Pashayev	000
(Italy) Valerio Accogli	001 (yellow card)
(Japan) Hifumi Abe	012
(Serbia) Marko Jorgić	000 (yellow card)

Quarter-finals
(Italy) Valerio Accogli	000
(Japan) Hifumi Abe	100

=== Pool C ===
First round
(El Salvador) Diego Calix	000 (yellow card)
(Kazakhstan) Akylzhan Zhubatkanov	111
(Lithuania) Simas Polikevičius	002
(Italy) Matteo Piras	000
(Montenegro) Jusuf Nurković	000
(Canada) Julien Frascadore	001
(Ecuador) Jonathan Benavides	000 (yellow card)
(France) Daikii Bouba	100 (yellow card)

Round of 32
(Tajikistan) Nurali Emomali	100
(Kazakhstan) Akylzhan Zhubatkanov	000
(Lithuania) Simas Polikevičius	001
Nasrullo Rakhmonov	000
(Brazil) Ronald Lima	010
(Canada) Julien Frascadore	000
(France) Daikii Bouba	000
(Moldova) Denis Vieru	001

Round of 16
(Tajikistan) Nurali Emomali	020
(Lithuania) Simas Polikevičius	000
(Brazil) Ronald Lima	000
(Moldova) Denis Vieru	001 (yellow card)

Quarter-finals
(Tajikistan) Nurali Emomali	000 (yellow card)
(Moldova) Denis Vieru	010

=== Pool D ===
First round
(Georgia (country)) Vazha Margvelashvili	000
(Azerbaijan) Nizami Imranov	100 (yellow card)
(Hungary) Bence Pongrácz	010
(United Kingdom) Charlie Young	000
(United Arab Emirates) Bayanmönkhiin Narmandakh	021
(Argentina) Joaquín Tovagliari	000
(China) Xue Ziyang	100 (yellow card)
(Cyprus) Petros Christodoulides	000

Round of 32
(Russia) Ramazan Abdulaev	010
(Azerbaijan) Nizami Imranov	000
(Hungary) Bence Pongrácz	000
(Mongolia) Yondonperenlein Baskhüü	100
(Spain) David García Torné	100
(United Arab Emirates) Bayanmönkhiin Narmandakh	010
(China) Xue Ziyang	100 (yellow card)
(Cuba) Orlando Polanco	000

Round of 16
(Russia) Ramazan Abdulaev	000
(Mongolia) Yondonperenlein Baskhüü	100 (yellow card)
(Spain) David García Torné	001
(China) Xue Ziyang	000

Quarter-finals
(Mongolia) Yondonperenlein Baskhüü	000 (yellow card)
(Spain) David García Torné	001

== Prize money ==
The sums listed bring the total prizes awarded to €57,000 for the individual event.

Medal	Total	Judoka	Coach
Gold	€26,000	€20,800	€5,200
Silver	€15,000	€12,000	€3,000
Bronze	€8,000	€6,400	€1,600
