= Judo at the 2022 Asian Games – Men's 66 kg =

Judo competition

Judo Men's 66 kg at the 2022 Asian Games
- Venue: Xiaoshan Linpu Gymnasium
- Location: Hangzhou, China
- Date: 24 September 2023

Medalists
gold medal	Ryoma Tanaka; Japan
silver medal	Yondonperenlein Baskhüü; Mongolia
bronze medal	An Ba-ul; South Korea
bronze medal	Bayanmönkhiin Narmandakh; United Arab Emirates

Competition at external databases
- Links: IJF • JudoInside

The men's 66 kilograms (half lightweight) competition in Judo at the 2022 Asian Games in Hangzhou was held on 24 September 2023 at the Xiaoshan Linpu Gymnasium.

In the final, Ryoma Tanaka from Japan won the gold medal.

== Schedule ==
All times are China Standard Time (UTC+08:00)

Date	Time	Event
Sunday, 24 September 2023	10:00	Elimination round of 16
Sunday, 24 September 2023	10:00	Quarterfinals
Sunday, 24 September 2023	10:00	Repechage
Sunday, 24 September 2023	10:00	Semifinals
Sunday, 24 September 2023	16:00	Finals

== Results ==
=== Main bracket ===
==== Final ====
Gold medal contest
Yondonperenlein Baskhüü (MGL)	00 (yellow card)
Ryoma Tanaka (JPN)	01

==== Top half ====
Round of 32
Indra Bahadur Shrestha (NEP)	00
Martin Lau (HKG)	10
Obid Dzhebov (TJK)	01
Trương Hoàng Phúc (VIE)	00 (yellow card)
Ramazan Kodzhakov (BHR)	00 (yellow card)
Xue Ziyang (CHN)	10 (yellow card)
Kinley Tshering (BHU)	00 (yellow card)
Joe Haddad (LBN)	01
Chen Haozheng (MAC)	00
Hekim Agamämmedow (TKM)	11

Round of 16
Yondonperenlein Baskhüü (MGL)	11
Martin Lau (HKG)	00
Obid Dzhebov (TJK)	10
Xue Ziyang (CHN)	00
Gusman Kyrgyzbayev (KAZ)	11
Joe Haddad (LBN)	00
Sardor Nurillaev (UZB)	01
Hekim Agamämmedow (TKM)	00 (yellow card)

Quarter-finals
Yondonperenlein Baskhüü (MGL)	10
Obid Dzhebov (TJK)	00
Gusman Kyrgyzbayev (KAZ)	00
Sardor Nurillaev (UZB)	10 (yellow card)

Semi-finals
Yondonperenlein Baskhüü (MGL)	10
Sardor Nurillaev (UZB)	00 (yellow card)

==== Bottom half ====
Round of 32
Ri Kum-song (PRK)	10
Abolfazl Mahmoudi (IRI)	00
Cheng Yen-ming (TPE)	01
Dewa Kadek Rama Warma Putra (INA)	00 (yellow card)
Saoud Al-Amiri (KUW)	00
Shugen Nakano (PHI)	10
Saeed Saeed (YEM)	00
Surasak Puntanam (THA)	10

Round of 16
An Ba-ul (KOR)	01 (yellow card)
Ri Kum-song (PRK)	00
Kubanychbek Aibek Uulu (KGZ)	10
Cheng Yen-ming (TPE)	00
Ryoma Tanaka (JPN)	10
Shugen Nakano (PHI)	00
Bayanmönkhiin Narmandakh (UAE)	11
Surasak Puntanam (THA)	00 (yellow card)

Quarter-finals
An Ba-ul (KOR)	01
Kubanychbek Aibek Uulu (KGZ)	00
Ryoma Tanaka (JPN)	10
Bayanmönkhiin Narmandakh (UAE)	00

Semi-finals
An Ba-ul (KOR)	00
Ryoma Tanaka (JPN)	10

=== Repechage ===
Repechage
Obid Dzhebov (TJK)	10
Gusman Kyrgyzbayev (KAZ)	00 (yellow card)
Kubanychbek Aibek Uulu (KGZ)	00
Bayanmönkhiin Narmandakh (UAE)	01 (yellow card)

Bronze medal contests
Obid Dzhebov (TJK)	00 (yellow card)
An Ba-ul (KOR)	01
Bayanmönkhiin Narmandakh (UAE)	10 (yellow card)
Sardor Nurillaev (UZB)	00
