= Judo at the 2022 Commonwealth Games – Men's 66 kg =

Judo competition

Judo – Men's 66 kg at the 2022 Commonwealth Games
- Venue: Coventry Arena
- Date: 1 August 2022
- Competitors: 16 from 14 nations

Medalists
gold medal	Georgios Balarjishvili	Cyprus
silver medal	Finlay Allan	Scotland
bronze medal	Nathan Katz	Australia
bronze medal	Nathon Burns	Northern Ireland

The Men's 66 kg judo competitions at the 2022 Commonwealth Games in Birmingham, England took place on August 1 at the Coventry Arena. A total of 16 competitors from 14 nations took part.

Georgios Balarjishvili won Cyprus' first ever Commonwealth Games gold medal in the sport of judo after defeating Finlay Allan in the gold medal match.

== Results ==
The draw is as follows:

Round of 16
Nathan Katz (AUS)	10
Jean Michel Vidot (SEY)	00 (yellow card)
Georgios Balarjishvili (CYP)	10 (yellow card)
Callum Nash (NIR)	00 (yellow card)
Alexander Short (SCO)	10 (yellow card)
A Chikwapula (MAW)	00 (yellow card)
Gregg Varey (WAL)	10
Bismark Yartey (GHA)	00
Steven Mungandu (ZAM)	10
A Abdulla (TAN)	00
Finlay Allan (SCO)	10
Mauro Nassone (MOZ)	00
Nathon Burns (NIR)	10
Patrick Edwin (NGR)	00
Jasleen Saini (IND)	10 (yellow card)
Maxence Cugola (VAN)	00

Quarter-finals
Nathan Katz (AUS)	00 (yellow card)
Georgios Balarjishvili (CYP)	01 (yellow card)
Alexander Short (SCO)	10
Gregg Varey (WAL)	00
Steven Mungandu (ZAM)	00
Finlay Allan (SCO)	10
Nathon Burns (NIR)	00
Jasleen Saini (IND)	10 (yellow card)

Semi-finals
Georgios Balarjishvili (CYP)	01
Alexander Short (SCO)	00
Finlay Allan (SCO)	10
Jasleen Saini (IND)	00 (yellow card)

Final
Georgios Balarjishvili (CYP)	10
Finlay Allan (SCO)	00

=== Repechages ===
Repechage
Nathan Katz (AUS)	10
Gregg Varey (WAL)	00
Steven Mungandu (ZAM)	00 (yellow card)
Nathon Burns (NIR)	01

Bronze medal
Nathan Katz (AUS)	10
Jasleen Saini (IND)	00
Nathon Burns (NIR)	10
Alexander Short (SCO)	00
