= 2023 European Judo Championships – Men's 66 kg =

Judo Men's 66 kg at the 2023 European Judo Championships
- Venue: Sud de France Arena
- Location: Montpellier, France
- Date: 3 November
- Competitors: 29 from 22 nations

Medalists
gold medal	Denis Vieru (1st title)	Moldova
silver medal	David García Torné	Spain
bronze medal	Walide Khyar	France
bronze medal	Bogdan Iadov	Ukraine

Competition at external databases
- Links: IJF • JudoInside

The men's 66 kg competition at the 2023 European Judo Championships was held on 3 November at the Sud de France Arena.

== Results ==
=== Finals ===
Semi-finals
Denis Vieru (MDA)	01 (yellow card)
Yashar Najafov (AZE)	00
Murad Chopanov (AIN)	00
David García Torné (ESP)	10

Final
Denis Vieru (MDA)	01
David García Torné (ESP)	00

=== Repechage ===
Repechage
Luukas Saha (FIN)	00
Walide Khyar (FRA)	10
Alberto Gaitero (ESP)	00 (yellow card)
Bogdan Iadov (UKR)	02 (yellow card)

Bronze medal
Walide Khyar (FRA)	01
Murad Chopanov (AIN)	00 (yellow card)
Bogdan Iadov (UKR)	01 (yellow card)
Yashar Najafov (AZE)	00

=== Pool A ===
First round
Artyom Ghalachyan (ARM)	01
Matej Poliak (SVK)	00 (yellow card)
Maxime Gobert (FRA)	00
Yago Abuladze (AIN)	02
Luukas Saha (FIN)	02 (yellow card)
Yanislav Gerchev (BUL)	00 (yellow card)

Round of 16
Denis Vieru (MDA)	11
Artyom Ghalachyan (ARM)	00
Yago Abuladze (AIN)	01 (yellow card)
Luukas Saha (FIN)	10

Quarter-finals
Denis Vieru (MDA)	01 (yellow card)
Luukas Saha (FIN)	00

=== Pool B ===
First round
Walide Khyar (FRA)	10 (yellow card)
Samuel Hall (GBR)	00 (yellow card)
Oscar Pertelson (EST)	00
Georgios Balarjishvili (CYP)	01
Yashar Najafov (AZE)	01
Matteo Piras (ITA)	00
Martin Setz (GER)	01 (yellow card)
Freddy Waizenegger (SUI)	00

Round of 16
Walide Khyar (FRA)	02
Georgios Balarjishvili (CYP)	00 (yellow card)
Yashar Najafov (AZE)	01
Martin Setz (GER)	00 (yellow card)

Quarter-finals
Walide Khyar (FRA)	00 (yellow card)
Yashar Najafov (AZE)	10

=== Pool C ===
First round
Murad Chopanov (AIN)	01
Radu Izvoreanu (MDA)	00
Alberto Gaitero (ESP)	01
Anthony De Angelis (LAT)	00 (yellow card)
Strahinja Bunčić (SRB)	10
Tal Flicker (ISR)	00

Round of 16
Vazha Margvelashvili (GEO)	00 (yellow card)
Murad Chopanov (AIN)	01
Alberto Gaitero (ESP)	01 (yellow card)
Strahinja Bunčić (SRB)	00 (yellow card)

Quarter-finals
Murad Chopanov (AIN)	01
Alberto Gaitero (ESP)	00

=== Pool D ===
First round
Viljar Lipard (EST)	10
Florian Doppelhammer (AUT)	00
David García Torné (ESP)	11 (yellow card)
Charlie Young (GBR)	00 (yellow card)
Fabio Basile (ITA)	01 (yellow card)
Bence Pongrácz (HUN)	00

Round of 16
Bogdan Iadov (UKR)	01
Viljar Lipard (EST)	00 (yellow card)
David García Torné (ESP)	01
Fabio Basile (ITA)	00

Quarter-finals
Bogdan Iadov (UKR)	00 (yellow card)
David García Torné (ESP)	02
