= 2025 European Judo Championships – Men's 66 kg =

Judo competition

Judo Men's 66 kg at the 2025 European Judo Championships
- Venue: Morača Sports Center
- Location: Podgorica, Montenegro
- Date: 23 April 2025
- Competitors: 35 from 26 nations

Medalists
gold medal	Daikii Bouba (1st title)	France
silver medal	Murad Chopanov
bronze medal	Luukas Saha	Finland
bronze medal	Walide Khyar	France

Competition at external databases
- Links: IJF • JudoInside

The men's 66 kg competition at the 2025 European Judo Championships was held at the Morača Sports Center in Podgorica, Montenegro on 23 April 2025.

== Results ==
=== Finals ===
Semi-finals
(International Judo Federation) Murad Chopanov	100
(Italy) Matteo Piras	010
(France) Daikii Bouba	100
(Finland) Luukas Saha	000

Final
(International Judo Federation) Murad Chopanov	001
(France) Daikii Bouba	011

=== Repechage ===
Repechage
(Spain) Adrián Nieto	100
(Moldova) Denis Vieru	000
(Italy) Elios Manzi	000
(France) Walide Khyar	100

Bronze medal
(Spain) Adrián Nieto	000
(Finland) Luukas Saha	100
(France) Walide Khyar	010 (yellow card)
(Italy) Matteo Piras	000

=== Pool A ===
First round
(Spain) Adrián Nieto	100
(United Kingdom) Michael Fryer	000

Round of 32
(International Judo Federation) Murad Chopanov	100 (yellow card)
(Hungary) Bence Pongrácz	000
(Poland) Jakub Kurowski	000
(Montenegro) Petar Radovic	100 (yellow card)
(Azerbaijan) Ruslan Pashayev	000
(Bulgaria) Boyan Yotov	100
(Spain) Adrián Nieto	010
(Turkey) Muhammed Demirel	000

Round of 16
(International Judo Federation) Murad Chopanov	100
(Montenegro) Petar Radovic	010
(Bulgaria) Boyan Yotov	000 (yellow card)
(Spain) Adrián Nieto	110 (yellow card)

Quarter-finals
(International Judo Federation) Murad Chopanov	100 (yellow card)
(Spain) Adrián Nieto	000 (yellow card)

=== Pool B ===
First round
(Georgia (country)) Temur Nozadze	010 (yellow card)
(Ukraine) Nazar Viskov	000

Round of 32
(Moldova) Denis Vieru	100 (yellow card)
(Estonia) Viljar Lipard	000
(Cyprus) Georgios Balarjishvili	000
(Portugal) Miguel Nery Gago	100
(Italy) Matteo Piras	101
(Germany) Nicolas Kunze	000
(Georgia (country)) Temur Nozadze	000
(Israel) Guy Gutman	100 (yellow card)

Round of 16
(Moldova) Denis Vieru	001 (yellow card)
(Portugal) Miguel Nery Gago	000
(Italy) Matteo Piras	100
(Israel) Guy Gutman	000

Quarter-finals
(Moldova) Denis Vieru	000
(Italy) Matteo Piras	100

=== Pool C ===
First round

Round of 32
(Georgia (country)) Vazha Margvelashvili	000 (yellow card)
(Germany) Martin Setz	110 (yellow card)
(Italy) Elios Manzi	100 (yellow card)
(Hungary) Bálint Gombás	000
(France) Daikii Bouba	110
(Lithuania) Andrej Klokov	000 (yellow card)
(Austria) Marcus Auer	100
(Latvia) Anthony De Angelis	000

Round of 16
(Germany) Martin Setz	000
(Italy) Elios Manzi	010
(France) Daikii Bouba	020
(Austria) Marcus Auer	000 (yellow card)

Quarter-finals
(Italy) Elios Manzi	000 (yellow card)
(France) Daikii Bouba	100

=== Pool D ===
First round
(Albania) Klajdi Bitri	000 (yellow card)
(Serbia) Strahinja Bunčić	111

Round of 32
(France) Walide Khyar	100
Mohammad Rashnonezhad	000
(International Judo Federation) Ivan Chernykh	100
(Montenegro) Jusuf Nurković	000
(Finland) Luukas Saha	100
(Cyprus) Petros Christodoulides	000
(Serbia) Strahinja Bunčić	000
(United Kingdom) Charlie Young	001 (yellow card)

Round of 16
(France) Walide Khyar	100
(International Judo Federation) Ivan Chernykh	001
(Finland) Luukas Saha	100
(United Kingdom) Charlie Young	000

Quarter-finals
(France) Walide Khyar	000
(Finland) Luukas Saha	001
