= Jasleen =

Jasleen is an Indian and Punjabi female given name, used especially from Sikhs. It is derived from Sanskrit यशस् (yaśas) meaning "fame, praise, glory" and लीन (līna) meaning "absorbed in". It may refer to:

- Jasleen Dhamija (1933–2023), Indian textile art historian, crafts expert, and United Nations worker
- Jasleen Kaur (born 1986), Scottish artist
- Jasleen Royal, Indian singer, songwriter, and composer
- Jasleen Singh Saini (born 1997), Indian judoka
