= Edmilson Pedro =

Angolan judoka (born 1997)

Personal information
- Born: 23 May 1997 (age 29) Luanda, Angola
- Occupation: Judoka

Sport
- Sport: Judo
- Weight class: ‍–‍66 kg

Achievements and titles
- Olympic Games: R32 (2024)
- World Champ.: R32 (2024)
- African Champ.: (gold) (2022, 2025)
Medal record
Men's judo
Representing Angola
African Championships
| Gold medal – first place | 2022 Oran | ‍–‍66 kg |
| Gold medal – first place | 2025 Abidjan | ‍–‍66 kg |
| Silver medal – second place | 2026 Nairobi | ‍–‍66 kg |
| Bronze medal – third place | 2024 Cairo | ‍–‍66 kg |

Profile at external databases
- IJF: 23160
- JudoInside.com: 122318
- Updated on 26 April 2026

Edmilson Pedro (born 23 May 1997) is an Angolan judoka. He qualified for the 2024 Summer Olympics and was named his country's flag bearer.

== Biography ==
Pedro was born on 23 May 1997 in Angola. He said that he "started practicing judo from the cradle", following after his older brothers who competed in the sport. He is nicknamed Bicho Papão (Bogeyman in Portuguese) and competed for the judo department of the club Interclube.

Pedro made his debut for the national team at the 2015 African Judo Championships. He became a decorated judoka in the Angolan ranks: by 2022, he had won the Luanda Province championship 10 times and the national championship eight times, also having been the national runner-up five times and provincial runner-up eight times. He participated at the 2018 African Judo Championships, placing seventh, and also competed at the 2018 World Judo Championships.

In 2022, Pedro competed at the African Judo Championships and won a gold medal in the 66 kg event. Later that year, he competed at African Open tournaments in Yaoundé and Dakar, winning gold at both. For his 2022 season, he was honored by the Angolan Olympic Committee as the nation's best male judoka. By February 2023, he had a global ranking in his weight class of 36th. His 2023 season included a silver medal at the African Open in Tunis and a gold at the African Open tournament in Luanda.

Pedro won bronze at the 2024 African Judo Championships and gold at the 2024 African Open in Luanda. He qualified for the 2024 Summer Olympics as the only Angolan judoka at the games, as well as the first-ever Angolan in the 66 kg weight class. He was the co-Angolan flag bearer at the opening Olympic ceremony. He lost to Serdar Rahimov of Turkmenistan in the round of 32 and did not advance.

Olympic Games
| Preceded by Natália Bernardo; Matias Montinho | Flag bearer for Angola; Paris 2024 with Azenaide Carlos | Succeeded by Incumbent |
