= Judo at the 2018 Asian Games – Men's 66 kg =

Judo competition

Men's 66 kg at the 2018 Asian Games
- Venue: Jakarta Convention Center
- Date: 29 August 2018
- Competitors: 22 from 22 nations

Medalists
gold medal	An Ba-ul	South Korea
silver medal	Joshiro Maruyama	Japan
bronze medal	Yeldos Zhumakanov	Kazakhstan
bronze medal	Artur Te	Kyrgyzstan

The men's 66 kilograms (Half lightweight) competition at the 2018 Asian Games in Jakarta was held on 29 August at the Jakarta Convention Center Assembly Hall.

== Schedule ==
All times are Western Indonesia Time (UTC+07:00)

Date	Time	Event
Wednesday, 29 August 2018	09:00	Elimination round of 32
Wednesday, 29 August 2018	09:00	Elimination round of 16
Wednesday, 29 August 2018	09:00	Quarterfinals
Wednesday, 29 August 2018	09:00	Repechage
Wednesday, 29 August 2018	09:00	Semifinals
Wednesday, 29 August 2018	16:00	Finals

== Results ==
=== Main bracket ===
==== Final ====
Gold medal contest
An Ba-ul (KOR)	10
Joshiro Maruyama (JPN)	00

==== Top half ====
Elimination round of 32
Mohammed Gamal Salem (YEM)	00
Huang Sheng-ting (TPE)	10
Yokubdzhon Bokiev (TJK)	10
Mochammad Syaiful Raharjo (INA)	01
Kim Hyong-un (PRK)	10
Indra Bahadur Shresta (NEP)	00

Elimination round of 16
An Ba-ul (KOR)	01
Huang Sheng-ting (TPE)	00
Ayoub El-Idrissi (QAT)	10
Chui Chun Sing (HKG)	00
Shakhram Ahadov (UZB)	10
Yokubdzhon Bokiev (TJK)	00
Alireza Khojasteh (IRI)	00
Kim Hyong-un (PRK)	10

Quarterfinals
An Ba-ul (KOR)	01
Ayoub El-Idrissi (QAT)	00
Shakhram Ahadov (UZB)	01
Kim Hyong-un (PRK)	00

Semifinals
An Ba-ul (KOR)	01
Shakhram Ahadov (UZB)	00

==== Bottom half ====
Elimination round of 32
Shugen Nakano (PHI)	10
Chong Wei Fu (MAS)	00
Muhammet Kössekow (TKM)	00
Wu Zhiqiang (CHN)	10
Phan Vũ Nam (VIE)	00
Mohammed Sattar (IRQ)	01

Elimination round of 16
Yeldos Zhumakanov (KAZ)	10
Shugen Nakano (PHI)	00
Battogtokhyn Erkhembayar (MGL)	01
Surasak Puntanam (THA)	00
Joshiro Maruyama (JPN)	10
Wu Zhiqiang (CHN)	00
Artur Te (KGZ)	01
Mohammed Sattar (IRQ)	00

Quarterfinals
Yeldos Zhumakanov (KAZ)	10
Battogtokhyn Erkhembayar (MGL)	00
Joshiro Maruyama (JPN)	10
Artur Te (KGZ)	00

Semifinals
Yeldos Zhumakanov (KAZ)	00
Joshiro Maruyama (JPN)	10

=== Repechage ===
Repechage
Ayoub El-Idrissi (QAT)	10
Kim Hyong-un (PRK)	00
Battogtokhyn Erkhembayar (MGL)	00
Artur Te (KGZ)	10

Bronze medal contests
Ayoub El-Idrissi (QAT)	00
Yeldos Zhumakanov (KAZ)	10
Artur Te (KGZ)	01
Shakhram Ahadov (UZB)	00
