= Yerlan Serikzhanov =

Kazakhstani judoka (born 1995)

Yerlan Serikzhanov Ерлан Серикжанов
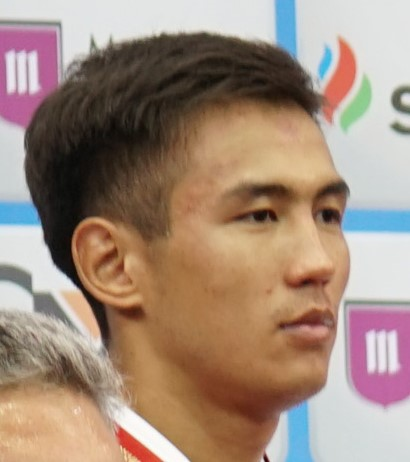
- Yerlan Serikzhanov at the 2018 World Judo Championships

Personal information
- Born: 12 February 1995 (age 31)
- Occupation: Judoka

Sport
- Country: Kazakhstan
- Sport: Judo
- Weight class: ‍–‍66 kg

Achievements and titles
- Olympic Games: R16 (2020)
- World Champ.: (silver) (2018)
- Asian Champ.: (gold) (2019)
Medal record
Men's judo
Representing Kazakhstan
World Championships
Silver medal – second place	2018 Baku	‍–‍66 kg
Asian Championships
Gold medal – first place	2019 Fujairah	‍–‍66 kg
IJF Grand Slam
Silver medal – second place	2018 Abu Dhabi	‍–‍66 kg
IJF Grand Prix
Silver medal – second place	2018 Agadir	‍–‍66 kg
Silver medal – second place	2020 Tel Aviv	‍–‍66 kg
Bronze medal – third place	2018 Tunis	‍–‍66 kg
Bronze medal – third place	2019 Marrakesh	‍–‍66 kg
World Cadets Championships
Bronze medal – third place	2011 Kyiv	‍–‍55 kg

Profile at external databases
- IJF: 8289
- JudoInside.com: 76696
- Updated on 21 May 2023

Yerlan Serikzhanov (Kazakh: Ерлан Серікжанов;born 12 February 1995) is a Kazakhstani judoka. He competed in the men's 66 kg event at the 2020 Summer Olympics in Tokyo, Japan.

Serikzhanov participated at the 2018 World Judo Championships, winning the silver medal in the ‍–‍66 kg category.
