= 2026 Asian Judo Championships =

Judo competition

2026 Judo Asian Judo Championships
- Venue: Ordos Sports Development Center Gymnasium
- Location: Ordos City, China
- Dates: 16–19 April 2026

Competition at external databases
- Links: IJF • JudoInside

The 2026 Asian Judo Championships will be held from 16 to 19 April 2026 at the Ordos Sports Development Center Gymnasium in Ordos City, China as part of the IJF World Tour. The last day of competition featured a mixed team event.

== Medal summary ==
=== Men's events ===
Event	Gold	Silver	Bronze
Extra-lightweight (−60 kg)	Ruslan Poltoratskii; Bahrain	Yang Yung-wei; Chinese Taipei	Samariddin Kuchkarov; Uzbekistan
Extra-lightweight (−60 kg)	Ruslan Poltoratskii; Bahrain	Yang Yung-wei; Chinese Taipei	Tüvshintöriin Tümenjargal; Mongolia
Half-lightweight (−66 kg)	Nurali Emomali; Tajikistan	Obid Dzhebov; Tajikistan	Kim Chann-yeong; South Korea
Half-lightweight (−66 kg)	Nurali Emomali; Tajikistan	Obid Dzhebov; Tajikistan	Xue Ziyang; China
Lightweight (−73 kg)	Muhiddin Asadulloev; Tajikistan	Makhmadbek Makhmadbekov; United Arab Emirates	Kazbek Naguchev; United Arab Emirates
Lightweight (−73 kg)	Muhiddin Asadulloev; Tajikistan	Makhmadbek Makhmadbekov; United Arab Emirates	Lee Eun-kyul; South Korea
Half-middleweight (−81 kg)	Adilet Almat; Kazakhstan	Somon Makhmadbekov; Tajikistan	Abylaikhan Zhubanazar; Kazakhstan
Half-middleweight (−81 kg)	Adilet Almat; Kazakhstan	Somon Makhmadbekov; Tajikistan	Askerbii Gerbekov; Bahrain
Middleweight (−90 kg)	Kim Jong-hoon; South Korea	Bu Hebilige; China	Aidar Arapov; Kazakhstan
Middleweight (−90 kg)	Kim Jong-hoon; South Korea	Bu Hebilige; China	Israpil Sagaipov; Bahrain
Half-heavyweight (−100 kg)	Said Sadrudinov; Bahrain	Dzhafar Kostoev; United Arab Emirates	Ernazar Sarsenbaev; Uzbekistan
Half-heavyweight (−100 kg)	Said Sadrudinov; Bahrain	Dzhafar Kostoev; United Arab Emirates	Huang Fuchun; China
Heavyweight (+100 kg)	Alisher Yusupov; Uzbekistan	Lee Seung-yeob; South Korea	Li Haiyang; China
Heavyweight (+100 kg)	Alisher Yusupov; Uzbekistan	Lee Seung-yeob; South Korea	Muzaffarbek Turoboyev; Uzbekistan

=== Women's events ===
Event	Gold	Silver	Bronze
Extra-lightweight (−48 kg)	Jamsrangiin Anudari; Mongolia	Laziza Haydarova; Uzbekistan	Zhuang Wenna; China
Extra-lightweight (−48 kg)	Jamsrangiin Anudari; Mongolia	Laziza Haydarova; Uzbekistan	Hui Xinran; China
Half-lightweight (−52 kg)	Myagmarsürengiin Nandin-Erdene; Mongolia	Sita Kadamboeva; Uzbekistan	Madina Qurbonzoda; Tajikistan
Half-lightweight (−52 kg)	Myagmarsürengiin Nandin-Erdene; Mongolia	Sita Kadamboeva; Uzbekistan	Sachi Ochiai; Japan
Lightweight (−57 kg)	Kim Hyon-a; North Korea	Terbishiin Ariunzayaa; Mongolia	Mina Komiyama; Japan
Lightweight (−57 kg)	Kim Hyon-a; North Korea	Terbishiin Ariunzayaa; Mongolia	Wang Nan; China
Half-middleweight (−63 kg)	Lkhagvatogoogiin Enkhriilen; Mongolia	Kim Ji-hye; North Korea	Kim Ji-su; South Korea
Half-middleweight (−63 kg)	Lkhagvatogoogiin Enkhriilen; Mongolia	Kim Ji-hye; North Korea	Esmigul Kuyulova; Kazakhstan
Middleweight (−70 kg)	Mun Song-hui; North Korea	Shirinjon Yuldoshova; Uzbekistan	Khurshida Razzokberdieva; Uzbekistan
Middleweight (−70 kg)	Mun Song-hui; North Korea	Shirinjon Yuldoshova; Uzbekistan	Inunganbi Takhellambam; India
Half-heavyweight (−78 kg)	Wu Hongtao; China	Yelyzaveta Lytvynenko; United Arab Emirates	Barchinoy Kodirova; Uzbekistan
Half-heavyweight (−78 kg)	Wu Hongtao; China	Yelyzaveta Lytvynenko; United Arab Emirates	Aruna Jangeldina; Kazakhstan
Heavyweight (+78 kg)	Niu Xinran; China	Lee Hyeon-ji; South Korea	Amarsaikhany Adiyaasüren; Mongolia
Heavyweight (+78 kg)	Niu Xinran; China	Lee Hyeon-ji; South Korea	Umida Nigmatova; Uzbekistan

=== Mixed events ===
Event	Gold	Silver	Bronze
Mixed team	Mongolia	Kazakhstan	South Korea
Mixed team	Mongolia	Kazakhstan	Kyrgyzstan

=== Medal table ===
* Host nation (China)

Rank	Nation	Gold	Silver	Bronze	Total
1	Mongolia (MGL)	4	1	2	7
2	Tajikistan (TJK)	2	2	1	5
3	China (CHN)*	2	1	6	9
4	North Korea (PRK)	2	1	0	3
5	Bahrain (BHR)	2	0	2	4
6	Uzbekistan (UZB)	1	3	6	10
7	South Korea (KOR)	1	2	4	7
8	Kazakhstan (KAZ)	1	1	4	6
9	United Arab Emirates (UAE)	0	3	1	4
10	Chinese Taipei (TPE)	0	1	0	1
11	Japan (JPN)	0	0	2	2
12	India (IND)	0	0	1	1
12	Kyrgyzstan (KGZ)	0	0	1	1
Totals (13 entries)		15	15	30	60
