= Nathan Katz (judoka) =

Australian Olympic judoka

Personal information
- Born: 17 January 1995 (age 31) Victoria, Australia
- Occupation: Judoka
- Website: www.teamkatz.com.au

Sport
- Country: Australia
- Sport: Judo
- Weight class: ‍–‍66 kg
- Retired: 18 October 2023

Achievements and titles
- Olympic Games: R16 (2020)
- World Champ.: R32 (2017, 2021)
- Oceania Champ.: (gold) (2015, 2016, 2017)
- Commonwealth Games: (bronze) (2022)
Medal record
Men's judo
Representing Australia
Oceania Championships
Gold medal – first place	2015 Nouvelle	‍–‍66 kg
Gold medal – first place	2016 Canberra	‍–‍66 kg
Gold medal – first place	2017 Nukuʻalofa	‍–‍66 kg
Oceania Junior Championships
Gold medal – first place	2014 Auckland	‍–‍66 kg
Gold medal – first place	2015 Nouvelle	‍–‍66 kg
Silver medal – second place	2010 Canberra	‍–‍55 kg
Silver medal – second place	2011 Papeete	‍–‍60 kg
Bronze medal – third place	2012 Cairns	‍–‍66 kg
Bronze medal – third place	2013 Apia	‍–‍66 kg
Commonwealth Games
Bronze medal – third place	2022 Birmingham	‍–‍66 kg

Profile at external databases
- IJF: 7602
- JudoInside.com: 67682
- Updated on 31 January 2023

Nathan Katz (born 17 January 1995) is a retired Australian Olympic and five-time national champion judoka, and current judo coach.

== Early and personal life ==
Katz was born in Melbourne, Australia, and is Jewish. Katz's mother is former judoka Kerrye Katz who competed at the 1988 Summer Olympics, when judo was a demonstration event for women, and came in seventh; she also won the 1985 Oceania Judo Championship in U66k, and 11 Australian national championships. His father Robert was a former judoka on the Australian national team and a national judo coach for Australia at both the 1988 Seoul Olympics and the 2016 Rio Olympics.

His younger brother Josh Katz also competed for Australia in judo at the Rio Olympics; he also competed at the Paris Olympics. The two brothers were training partners since they were children. He graduated from William Clarke College.

== Judo career ==
Katz was a 2x Cadet Australian National Champion, and a 5x Australian National Champion.

Katz qualified for the 2016 Rio Olympics due to his having been Oceania champion in 2015 and 2016. He was ranked number 1 in the 2015 IJF World Ranking for juniors U66kg. In 2022 he underwent knee surgery.

Katz competed at the 2016 Summer Olympics in the men's 66 kg event, in which he was eliminated in the second round by Imad Bassou.

Katz started his 2020 Tokyo men's 66 kg event in the round of 32 against Juan Postigos of Peru, winning seconds before golden score with a stunning left-drop seoinage. In the round of 16, He fought Baruch Shmailov of Israel who he ended up losing to. Shmailov went on to fight for bronze.

He won a bronze medal at the 2022 Commonwealth Games in Birmingham, England. It was his first competition in six months, as he had been injured.

He retired from competition in October 2023. He is now his brother's training partner and coach.
