= Ganboldyn Kherlen =

Mongolian judoka (born 1992)

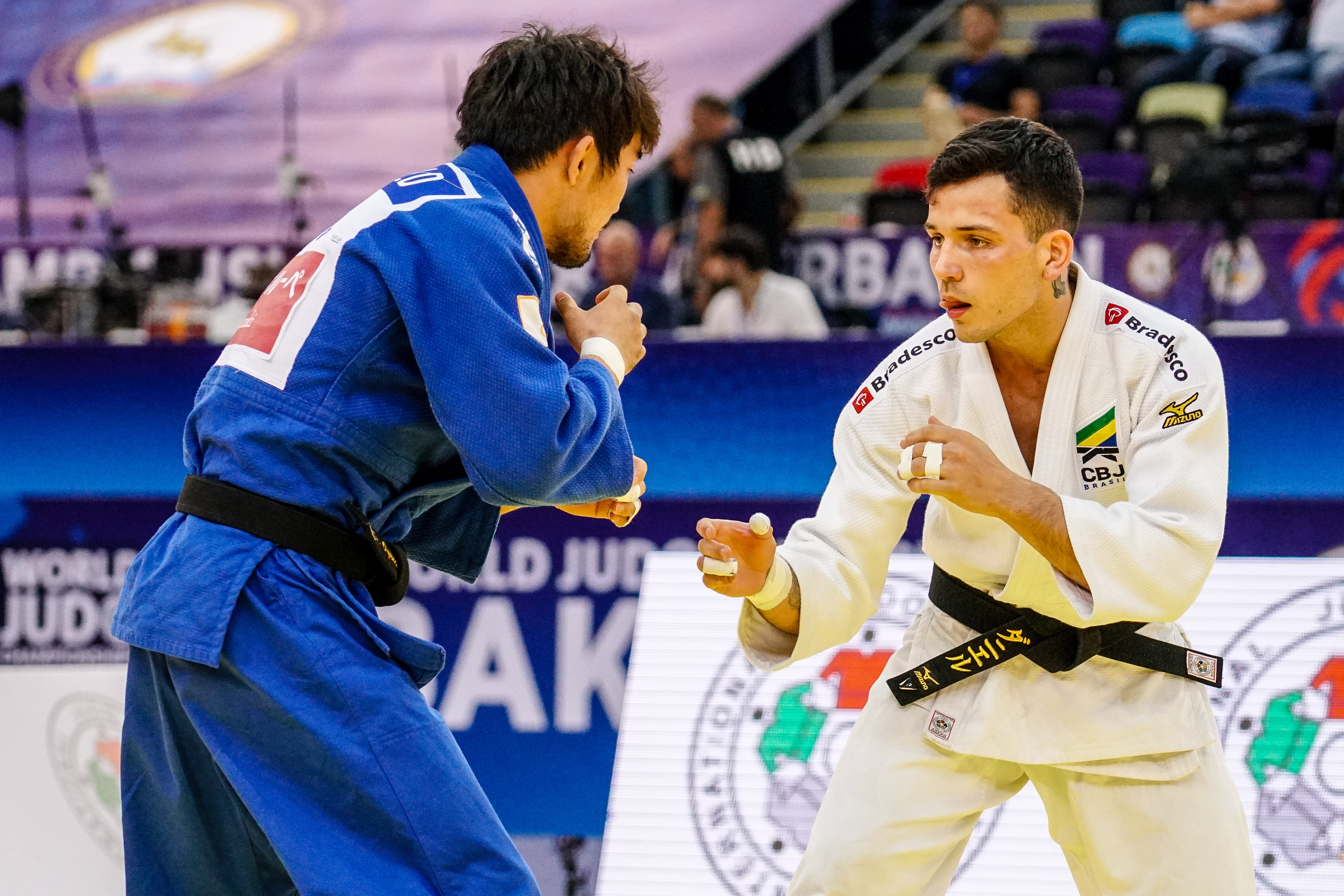
- Ganbold (left) at the 2018 World Judo Championships

Personal information
- Native name: Ганболдын Хэрлэн
- Nationality: Mongolia
- Born: 24 February 1992 (age 34) Ulaanbaatar, Mongolia
- Occupation: Judoka
- Height: 173 cm (5 ft 8 in)

Sport
- Country: Mongolia
- Sport: Judo
- Weight class: –66 kg

Achievements and titles
- World Champ.: 7th (2018)
- Asian Champ.: (bronze) (2017)
- National finals: (gold) (2015, 2017, 2018, 2020)
Medal record
Men's judo
Representing Mongolia
Asian Championships
Bronze medal – third place	2017 Hong Kong	–66 kg
World Masters
Gold medal – first place	2017 Saint Petersburg	–66 kg
Silver medal – second place	2019 Qingdao	–66 kg
IJF Grand Slam
Bronze medal – third place	2014 Abu Dhabi	–60 kg
Bronze medal – third place	2021 Tbilisi	–66 kg
Bronze medal – third place	2022 Tel Aviv	–66 kg
Bronze medal – third place	2022 Budapest	–66 kg
IJF Grand Prix
Gold medal – first place	2012 Qingdao	–60 kg
Gold medal – first place	2013 Miami	–60 kg
Gold medal – first place	2019 Montreal	–66 kg
Gold medal – first place	2019 Budapest	–66 kg
Silver medal – second place	2013 Qingdao	–60 kg
Silver medal – second place	2017 Tashkent	–66 kg
Bronze medal – third place	2013 Ulaanbaatar	–60 kg
Bronze medal – third place	2013 Tashkent	–60 kg
Bronze medal – third place	2014 Astana	–60 kg
Bronze medal – third place	2014 Tashkent	–60 kg
Bronze medal – third place	2014 Jeju	–60 kg
Bronze medal – third place	2015 Zagreb	–60 kg
Bronze medal – third place	2015 Ulaanbaatar	–60 kg
Bronze medal – third place	2018 Antalya	–66 kg
Asian Cadet Championships
Gold medal – first place	2007 Hyderabad	–55 kg

Profile at external databases
- IJF: 3707
- JudoInside.com: 50385
- Updated on 8 July 2022

Ganboldyn Kherlen (Mongolian: Ганболдын Хэрлэн born 24 February 1992) is a Mongolian judoka.

He is the 2017 Judo World Masters champion in the –66 kg, defeating Yeldos Zhumakanov in the final.

At the start of the 2016 Judo Grand Slam Tokyo, he has switched from the –60 kg to the –66 kg with continuing success.

He won one of the bronze medals in his event at the 2022 Judo Grand Slam Tel Aviv held in Tel Aviv, Israel.
