= 2025 Judo Grand Slam Dushanbe =

Judo competition

Judo 2025 Judo Grand Slam Dushanbe
- Venue: Kasri Tennis
- Location: Dushanbe, Tajikistan
- Dates: 2–4 May 2025
- Competitors: 226 from 27 nations
- Total prize money: €154,000

Competition at external databases
- Links: IJF • JudoInside

The 2025 Judo Grand Slam Dushanbe was held at the Kasri Tennis arena in Dushanbe, Tajikistan, from 2 to 4 May 2025 as part of the IJF World Tour.

== Medal summary ==
=== Men's events ===
Event	Gold	Silver	Bronze
Extra-lightweight (−60 kg)	Balabay Aghayev (AZE)	Mehrzod Sufiev (TJK)	Enkhtaivany Ariunbold (MGL)
Extra-lightweight (−60 kg)	Balabay Aghayev (AZE)	Mehrzod Sufiev (TJK)	Maxime Merlin (FRA)
Half-lightweight (−66 kg)	Nurali Emomali (TJK)	Obid Dzhebov (TJK)	Artyom Shturbabin (UZB)
Half-lightweight (−66 kg)	Nurali Emomali (TJK)	Obid Dzhebov (TJK)	Yosin Bobokalonov (TJK)
Lightweight (−73 kg)	Muhiddin Asadulloev (TJK)	Batzayaagiin Erdenebayar (MGL)	Khojiakbar Toshev (UZB)
Lightweight (−73 kg)	Muhiddin Asadulloev (TJK)	Batzayaagiin Erdenebayar (MGL)	Abubakr Sherov (TJK)
Half-middleweight (−81 kg)	Somon Makhmadbekov (TJK)	Adam Tsechoev (IJF)	Murodjon Yuldoshev (UZB)
Half-middleweight (−81 kg)	Somon Makhmadbekov (TJK)	Adam Tsechoev (IJF)	Kote Kapanadze (GEO)
Middleweight (−90 kg)	Eljan Hajiyev (AZE)	Vugar Talibov (AZE)	Adam Kopecký (CZE)
Middleweight (−90 kg)	Eljan Hajiyev (AZE)	Vugar Talibov (AZE)	Egor Andoni (IJF)
Half-heavyweight (−100 kg)	Dzhafar Kostoev (UAE)	Dzhakhongir Madzhidov (TJK)	Huang Fuchun (CHN)
Half-heavyweight (−100 kg)	Dzhafar Kostoev (UAE)	Dzhakhongir Madzhidov (TJK)	Karomatullo Khakimov (TJK)
Heavyweight (+100 kg)	Temur Rakhimov (TJK)	Dzhamal Gamzatkhanov (AZE)	Utkirbek Turoboyev (UZB)
Heavyweight (+100 kg)	Temur Rakhimov (TJK)	Dzhamal Gamzatkhanov (AZE)	Tieman Diaby (FRA)

=== Women's events ===
Event	Gold	Silver	Bronze
Extra-lightweight (−48 kg)	Jamsrangiin Anudari (MGL)	Zhuang Wenna (CHN)	Wakana Inagaki (JPN)
Extra-lightweight (−48 kg)	Jamsrangiin Anudari (MGL)	Zhuang Wenna (CHN)	Abiba Abuzhakynova (KAZ)
Half-lightweight (−52 kg)	Amandine Buchard (FRA)	Mukhayyo Akhmatova (UZB)	Blandine Pont (FRA)
Half-lightweight (−52 kg)	Amandine Buchard (FRA)	Mukhayyo Akhmatova (UZB)	Madina Qurbonzoda (TJK)
Lightweight (−57 kg)	Sarah-Léonie Cysique (FRA)	Natalia Elkina (IJF)	Tao Yuying (CHN)
Lightweight (−57 kg)	Sarah-Léonie Cysique (FRA)	Natalia Elkina (IJF)	Ana Viktorija Puljiz (CRO)
Half-middleweight (−63 kg)	Boldyn Gankhaich (MGL)	Melkia Auchecorne (FRA)	Lubjana Piovesana (AUT)
Half-middleweight (−63 kg)	Boldyn Gankhaich (MGL)	Melkia Auchecorne (FRA)	Seiko Watanabe (JPN)
Middleweight (−70 kg)	Lara Cvjetko (CRO)	Kelly Petersen Pollard (GBR)	Yu Dan (CHN)
Middleweight (−70 kg)	Lara Cvjetko (CRO)	Kelly Petersen Pollard (GBR)	Katarzyna Sobierajska (POL)
Half-heavyweight (−78 kg)	Emma Reid (GBR)	Peng Yuxiao (CHN)	Alina Böhm (GER)
Half-heavyweight (−78 kg)	Emma Reid (GBR)	Peng Yuxiao (CHN)	Kaïla Issoufi (FRA)
Heavyweight (+78 kg)	Jia Chundi (CHN)	Liang Ye (CHN)	Dambadarjaagiin Nominzul (MGL)
Heavyweight (+78 kg)	Jia Chundi (CHN)	Liang Ye (CHN)	Alfiia Dashkina (IJF)

=== Medal table ===
* Host nation (Tajikistan)

Rank	Nation	Gold	Silver	Bronze	Total
1	Tajikistan (TJK)*	4	3	4	11
2	Azerbaijan (AZE)	2	2	0	4
3	France (FRA)	2	1	4	7
4	Mongolia (MGL)	2	1	2	5
5	China (CHN)	1	3	3	7
6	Great Britain (GBR)	1	1	0	2
7	Croatia (CRO)	1	0	1	2
8	United Arab Emirates (UAE)	1	0	0	1
9	International Judo Federation (IJF)	0	2	2	4
10	Uzbekistan (UZB)	0	1	4	5
11	Japan (JPN)	0	0	2	2
12	Austria (AUT)	0	0	1	1
12	Czech Republic (CZE)	0	0	1	1
12	Georgia (GEO)	0	0	1	1
12	Germany (GER)	0	0	1	1
12	Kazakhstan (KAZ)	0	0	1	1
12	Poland (POL)	0	0	1	1
Totals (17 entries)		14	14	28	56

== Prize money ==
The sums written are per medalist, bringing the total prizes awarded to €154,000. (retrieved from:)

Medal	Total	Judoka	Coach
Gold	€5,000	€4,000	€1,000
Silver	€3,000	€2,400	€600
Bronze	€1,500	€1,200	€300
