= Ryoma Tanaka =

Japanese judoka (born 2001)

Personal information
- Born: 28 December 2001 (age 24)
- Occupation: Judoka

Sport
- Country: Japan
- Sport: Judo
- Weight class: ‍–‍66 kg

Achievements and titles
- World Champ.: (gold) (2024)
- Asian Champ.: (gold) (2023, 2025)
- Highest world ranking: 1^{st}
Medal record
Men's judo
Representing Japan
World Championships
Gold medal – first place	2024 Abu Dhabi	‍–‍66 kg
Asian Games
Gold medal – first place	2023 Hangzhou	‍–‍66 kg
Gold medal – first place	2023 Hangzhou	Mixed team
Asian Championships
Gold medal – first place	2025 Bangkok	‍–‍66 kg
Silver medal – second place	2022 Nur‑Sultan	‍–‍66 kg
World Masters
Gold medal – first place	2023 Budapest	‍–‍66 kg
IJF Grand Slam
Gold medal – first place	2021 Paris	‍–‍66 kg
Silver medal – second place	2025 Baku	‍–‍66 kg
Bronze medal – third place	2021 Baku	‍–‍66 kg
Bronze medal – third place	2022 Paris	‍–‍66 kg
Bronze medal – third place	2022 Tbilisi	‍–‍66 kg
Bronze medal – third place	2024 Tokyo	‍–‍66 kg
IJF Grand Prix
Bronze medal – third place	2025 Qingdao	‍–‍66 kg

Profile at external databases
- IJF: 46349
- JudoInside.com: 115337
- Updated on 30 September 2025

Ryoma Tanaka (born 28 December 2001) is a Japanese judoka. He won the gold medal in the men's 66 kg event at the 2024 World Judo Championships held in Abu Dhabi, United Arab Emirates.

== Career ==
Tanaka is the gold medallist of the 2021 Judo Grand Slam Paris in the ‍–‍66 kg category. He won one of the bronze medals in his event at the 2022 Judo Grand Slam Paris held in Paris, France.

== Personal life ==
Tanaka's younger brother, Ryuga, is also a judoka.
