= Ramazan Abdulaev =

Russian judoka (born 1998)

Personal information
- Native name: Рамазан Хажович Абдулаев
- Full name: Ramazan Khazhovich Abdulaev
- Born: 30 April 1998 (age 28) Tlyaratinsky District, Dagestan, Russia
- Occupation: Judoka

Sport
- Country: Russia
- Sport: Judo
- Weight class: ‍–‍60 kg

Achievements and titles
- World Champ.: R16 (2025, 2026)
- European Champ.: 5th (2023)
Medal record
Men's judo
Representing the IJF
IJF Grand Slam
Gold medal – first place	2025 Tashkent	‍–‍66 kg
Gold medal – first place	2025 Astana	‍–‍66 kg
Representing Individual Neutral Athletes
IJF Grand Slam
Gold medal – first place	2023 Baku	‍–‍60 kg
Gold medal – first place	2024 Baku	‍–‍60 kg
Gold medal – first place	2024 Astana	‍–‍60 kg
Bronze medal – third place	2023 Ulaanbaatar	‍–‍60 kg
IJF Grand Prix
Gold medal – first place	2023 Dushanbe	‍–‍60 kg
Representing Russia
IJF Grand Slam
Silver medal – second place	2021 Paris	‍–‍60 kg
Silver medal – second place	2021 Abu Dhabi	‍–‍60 kg
Silver medal – second place	2026 Ulaanbaatar	‍–‍66 kg
Bronze medal – third place	2021 Tel Aviv	‍–‍60 kg
Bronze medal – third place	2021 Kazan	‍–‍60 kg
Bronze medal – third place	2026 Tbilisi	‍–‍66 kg
Bronze medal – third place	2026 Astana	‍–‍66 kg
Bronze medal – third place	2026 Lausanne	‍–‍66 kg
European U23 Championships
Gold medal – first place	2019 Izhevsk	‍–‍60 kg
European Junior Championships
Bronze medal – third place	2017 Maribor	‍–‍60 kg

Profile at external databases
- IJF: 21203
- JudoInside.com: 95660
- Updated on 5 October 2026

Ramazan Khazhovich Abdulaev (born 30 April 1998) is a Russian judoka. He is the silver medallist in the ‍–‍60 kg at the 2021 Judo Grand Slam Paris

At the 2021 Judo Grand Slam Abu Dhabi held in Abu Dhabi, United Arab Emirates, he won the silver medal in his event.
