= Judo at the 2023 Pan American Games – Men's 66 kg =

Judo Men's 66 kg at the 2023 Pan American Games
- Venue: Contact Sports Center
- Location: Santiago, Chile
- Date: October 28
- Competitors: 11 from 11 nations
- Website: Official website

Medalists
gold medal	Willis García (1st title)	Venezuela
silver medal	Julien Frascadore	Canada
bronze medal	Orlando Polanco	Cuba
bronze medal	Willian Lima	Brazil

Competition at external databases
- Links: IJF

The men's 66 kg competition of the judo events at the 2023 Pan American Games was held on October 28 at the Contact Sports Center (Centro de Entrenamiento de los Deportes de Contacto) in Santiago, Chile. A total of 11 athletes from 11 NOC's competed.

== Schedule ==
All times are local (UTC−3)

Date	Time	Event
Saturday, 28 October 2023	10:00	Elimination round of 16
Saturday, 28 October 2023	11:00	Quarterfinals
Saturday, 28 October 2023	11:00	Repechage
Saturday, 28 October 2023	12:00	Semifinals
Saturday, 28 October 2023	15:00	Finals

== Results ==
=== Main Bracket ===
Round of 16
Julien Frascadore (CAN)	10 (yellow card)
Robin Jara (MEX)	00
Sebastián Pérez (CHI)	00
Juan Hernández (COL)	01
Willis García (VEN)	10 (yellow card)
Joaquín Tovagliari (ARG)	00

Quarter-finals
Juan Postigos (PER)	01
Elmert Ramírez (DOM)	00
Lenin Preciado (ECU)	00
Julien Frascadore (CAN)	10 (yellow card)
Orlando Polanco (CUB)	01
Juan Hernández (COL)	00
Willian Lima (BRA)	01
Willis García (VEN)	10

Semi-finals
Juan Postigos (PER)	00
Julien Frascadore (CAN)	10
Orlando Polanco (CUB)	00
Willis García (VEN)	10 (yellow card)

Gold medal contest
Julien Frascadore (CAN)	00
Willis García (VEN)	10

=== Repechage ===
Repechage
Elmet Ramírez (DOM)	00 (yellow card)
Lenin Preciado (ECU)	10 (yellow card)
Juan Hernández (COL)	00
Willian Lima (BRA)	01

Bronze medal contests
Lenin Preciado (ECU)	00
Orlando Polanco (CUB)	01
Willian Lima (BRA)	10
Juan Postigos (PER)	00
