= Cho Mok-hee =

South Korean judoka

Personal information
- Nationality: South Korean
- Born: 5 November 1993 (age 32)
- Occupation: Judoka

Sport
- Country: South Korea
- Sport: Judo
- Weight class: –63 kg

Achievements and titles
- World Champ.: R32 (2021)
- Asian Champ.: (bronze) (2021)
Medal record
Women's judo
Representing South Korea
Asian Championships
Bronze medal – third place	2021 Bishkek	–63 kg
IJF Grand Prix
Gold medal – first place	2019 Montreal	–63 kg
Bronze medal – third place	2019 Zagreb	–63 kg

Profile at external databases
- IJF: 35423
- JudoInside.com: 92862
- Updated on 29 November 2022

Cho Mok-hee (born 5 November 1993) is a South Korean judoka.

She is the bronze medallist of the 2021 Asian-Pacific Judo Championships in the -63 kg category.
