= 2021 Asian-Pacific Judo Championships =

Judo competition

2021 Asia-Oceania Judo Championships
- Venue: Sport Venue Gazprom
- Location: Bishkek, Kyrgyzstan
- Dates: 6–9 April
- Competitors: 182 from 29 nations

The 2021 Asia-Oceania Judo Championships were held in Bishkek, Kyrgyzstan from April 6 to April 9, 2021.

== Medal summary ==
=== Men ===
Event	Gold	Silver	Bronze
Extra lightweight −60 kg	Naohisa Takato; Japan	Yang Yung-wei; Chinese Taipei	Lee Ha-rim; South Korea
Extra lightweight −60 kg	Naohisa Takato; Japan	Yang Yung-wei; Chinese Taipei	Kubanychbek Aibek Uulu; Kyrgyzstan
Half lightweight −66 kg	Sardor Nurillaev; Uzbekistan	An Ba-ul; South Korea	Kim Lim-hwan; South Korea
Half lightweight −66 kg	Sardor Nurillaev; Uzbekistan	An Ba-ul; South Korea	Yeldos Zhumakanov; Kazakhstan
Lightweight −73 kg	An Chang-rim; South Korea	Somon Makhmadbekov; Tajikistan	Victor Scvortov; United Arab Emirates
Lightweight −73 kg	An Chang-rim; South Korea	Somon Makhmadbekov; Tajikistan	Qing Daga; China
Half middleweight −81 kg	Vladimir Zoloev; Kyrgyzstan	Lee Moon-jin; South Korea	Sharofiddin Boltaboev; Uzbekistan
Half middleweight −81 kg	Vladimir Zoloev; Kyrgyzstan	Lee Moon-jin; South Korea	Saeid Mollaei; Mongolia
Middleweight −90 kg	Davlat Bobonov; Uzbekistan	Shoichiro Mukai; Japan	Gwak Dong-han; South Korea
Middleweight −90 kg	Davlat Bobonov; Uzbekistan	Shoichiro Mukai; Japan	Komronshokh Ustopiriyon; Tajikistan
Half heavyweight −100 kg	Aaron Wolf; Japan	Mukhammadkarim Khurramov; Uzbekistan	Muzaffarbek Turoboyev; Uzbekistan
Half heavyweight −100 kg	Aaron Wolf; Japan	Mukhammadkarim Khurramov; Uzbekistan	Erihemubatu; China
Heavyweight +100 kg	Hisayoshi Harasawa; Japan	Kim Min-jong; South Korea	Kim Sung-min; South Korea
Heavyweight +100 kg	Hisayoshi Harasawa; Japan	Kim Min-jong; South Korea	Temur Rakhimov; Tajikistan

=== Women ===
Event	Gold	Silver	Bronze
Extra lightweight −48 kg	Li Yanan; China	Abiba Abuzhakynova; Kazakhstan	Lin Chen-hao; Chinese Taipei
Extra lightweight −48 kg	Li Yanan; China	Abiba Abuzhakynova; Kazakhstan	Gulnur Muratbaeva; Uzbekistan
Half lightweight −52 kg	Park Da-sol; South Korea	Diyora Keldiyorova; Uzbekistan	Sita Kadamboeva; Uzbekistan
Half lightweight −52 kg	Park Da-sol; South Korea	Diyora Keldiyorova; Uzbekistan	Hsu Lin-hsuan; Chinese Taipei
Lightweight −57 kg	Lu Tongjuan; China	Kim Ji-su; South Korea	Sevara Nishanbayeva; Kazakhstan
Lightweight −57 kg	Lu Tongjuan; China	Kim Ji-su; South Korea	Nilufar Ermaganbetova; Uzbekistan
Half middleweight −63 kg	Han Hee-ju; South Korea	Katharina Haecker; Australia	Cho Mok-hee; South Korea
Half middleweight −63 kg	Han Hee-ju; South Korea	Katharina Haecker; Australia	Yang Junxia; China
Middleweight −70 kg	Gulnoza Matniyazova; Uzbekistan	Kim Seong-yeon; South Korea	Aoife Coughlan; Australia
Middleweight −70 kg	Gulnoza Matniyazova; Uzbekistan	Kim Seong-yeon; South Korea	Sun Xiaoqian; China
Half heavyweight −78 kg	Yoon Hyun-ji; South Korea	Ma Zhenzhao; China	Lee Jeong-yun; South Korea
Half heavyweight −78 kg	Yoon Hyun-ji; South Korea	Ma Zhenzhao; China	Chen Fei; China
Heavyweight +78 kg	Xu Shiyan; China	Wang Yan; China	Han Mi-jin; South Korea
Heavyweight +78 kg	Xu Shiyan; China	Wang Yan; China	Kim Ha-yun; South Korea

=== Mixed ===
Event	Gold	Silver	Bronze
Team	South Korea	Kazakhstan	China
Team	South Korea	Kazakhstan	Uzbekistan

== Medal table ==
Rank	Nation	Gold	Silver	Bronze	Total
1	South Korea	5	5	8	18
2	China	3	2	6	11
2	Uzbekistan	3	2	6	11
4	Japan	3	1	0	4
5	Kyrgyzstan	1	0	1	2
6	Kazakhstan	0	2	2	4
7	Chinese Taipei	0	1	2	3
7	Tajikistan	0	1	2	3
9	Australia	0	1	1	2
10	Mongolia	0	0	1	1
10	United Arab Emirates	0	0	1	1
Totals (11 entries)		15	15	30	60
