= Judo at the 2026 Commonwealth Games – Men's 66 kg =

Judo competition

Judo – Men's 66 kg at the 2026 Commonwealth Games
- Venue: SEC Centre, Glasgow
- Date: July 31 2026
- Competitors: 19 from 16 nations

Medalists
gold medal	Julien Frascadore	Canada
silver medal	Georgios Balarjishvili	Cyprus
bronze medal	Michael Fryer	England
bronze medal	Petros Christodoulidis	Cyprus

The Men's 66 kg judo competitions at the 2026 Commonwealth Games in Glasgow, Scotland will place on July 31 at the SEC Centre. 19 entrants from 15 nations are entered to take part.

== Seedings ==
The following judoka were seeded in advance of the draw:

Men's 66 kg
Seed	Judoka	Nation
1	Petros Christodoulidis	Cyprus
2	Julien Frascadore	Canada
3	Vas Middleton	Australia
4	Georgios Balarjishvili	Cyprus
5	Michael Fryer	England
6	Michael Agbo	Nigeria
7	Aiden Moffat	Scotland
8	Samuel Ribeiro	Mozambique

== Final phase ==
=== Gold final path ===
Gold medal final
G Balarjishvili (CYP)	000
Julien Frascadore (CAN)	001

=== Repechage/bronze medal path ===
Competitors who were eliminated by either of the finalists during the competition enter the repechage for a bronze medal.

Repechage
Rohit Basir Majgul (IND)	001
Michael Fryer (ENG)	002
Aiden Moffat (SCO)	000
Vas Middleton (AUS)	100 (yellow card)

Bronze medal
Michael Fryer (ENG)	101
Michael Agbo (NGR)	000
Vas Middleton (AUS)	000 (yellow card)
Petros Christodoulidis (CYP)	001

== Preliminary phase ==
=== Top half ===
Round of 32
Neil Macdonald (SCO)	101
Kehinde Aremu (NGR)	000

Round of 16
P Christodoulidis (CYP)	100 (yellow card)
Simon Zulu (ZAM)	000
Samuel Ribeiro (MOZ)	000 (yellow card)
Rohit Basir Majgul (IND)	100 (yellow card)
G Balarjishvili (CYP)	100
Steven Rabet (JEY)	000
Michael Fryer (ENG)	101
Neil Macdonald (SCO)	001

Quarterfinals
P Christodoulidis (CYP)	001 (yellow card)
Rohit Basir Majgul (IND)	000
G Balarjishvili (CYP)	011
Michael Fryer (ENG)	000 (yellow card)

Semifinal
P Christodoulidis (CYP)	000 (yellow card)
G Balarjishvili (CYP)	101

=== Bottom half ===
Round of 32
Felix Okoko (KEN)	002
Joshua Bell (WAL)	100 (yellow card)

Round of 16
Julien Frascadore (CAN)	100
Mederic Lawson (TOG)	000
Aiden Moffat (SCO)	101
Joshua Bell (WAL)	000 (yellow card)
Vas Middleton (AUS)	003
Daraidun Canon (NRU)	000
Michael Agbo (NGR)	101
Louis Michael Flora (MRI)	000

Quarterfinals
Julien Frascadore (CAN)	100
Aiden Moffat (SCO)	000
Vas Middleton (AUS)	000
Michael Agbo (NGR)	002 (yellow card)

Semifinal
Julien Frascadore (CAN)	102 (yellow card)
Michael Agbo (NGR)	000
