= Michael Fryer =

British judoka (born 1999)

Personal information
- Born: 30 September 1999 (age 27)
- Occupation: Judoka

Sport
- Country: Great Britain
- Sport: Judo
- Weight class: ‍–‍66 kg

Achievements and titles
- World Champ.: R64 (2026)
- European Champ.: R64 (2025)
- Commonwealth Games: (bronze) (2026)
Medal record
Men's judo
Representing Great Britain
IJF Grand Prix
Silver medal – second place	2024 Zagreb	‍–‍66 kg
Representing England
Commonwealth Games
Bronze medal – third place	2026 Glasgow	‍–‍66 kg

Profile at external databases
- IJF: 37409
- JudoInside.com: 25450
- Updated on 5 October 2026

Michael Fryer (born 30 September 1999) is a British judoka. He won a bronze medal at the 2026 Commonwealth Games.

== Biography ==
From Tring, Fryer started in judoka at the Rush Judo club in Berkhamsted, having previously participated in gymnastics.

He won his first medal at the European Open level in 2022. Fryer won a silver medal in 2025 at the Dubrovnik Senior European Cup and now a bronze medal at the La Nucia European Open in Benidorm. In October, he won the first gold medal of his senior career in Sarajevo.

Selected to represent England in Judo at the 2026 Commonwealth Games in Glasgow, Scotland, he was a bronze medalist in the men's 66kg division.
