= Sardor Nurillaev =

Uzbekistani judoka (born 1994)

Personal information
- Born: 12 November 1994 (age 31) Samarkand, Uzbekistan
- Occupation: Judoka

Sport
- Country: Uzbekistan
- Sport: Judo
- Weight class: ‍–‍66 kg

Achievements and titles
- Olympic Games: R32 (2020, 2024)
- World Champ.: R16 (2019, 2024)
- Asian Champ.: (gold) (2021)
Medal record
Men's judo
Representing Uzbekistan
World Championships
Bronze medal – third place	2021 Budapest	Mixed team
Asian Games
Silver medal – second place	2023 Hangzhou	Mixed team
Asian Championships
Gold medal – first place	2021 Bishkek	‍–‍66 kg
Bronze medal – third place	2024 Hong Kong	‍–‍66 kg
IJF Grand Slam
Gold medal – first place	2021 Tbilisi	‍–‍66 kg
Silver medal – second place	2023 Tashkent	‍–‍66 kg
Silver medal – second place	2024 Tbilisi	‍–‍66 kg
Bronze medal – third place	2021 Tel Aviv	‍–‍66 kg
Bronze medal – third place	2021 Tashkent	‍–‍66 kg
Bronze medal – third place	2022 Antalya	‍–‍66 kg
IJF Grand Prix
Gold medal – first place	2019 Marrakesh	‍–‍66 kg
Silver medal – second place	2018 Tashkent	‍–‍66 kg
Silver medal – second place	2023 Zagreb	‍–‍66 kg
Bronze medal – third place	2017 Tashkent	‍–‍66 kg
Bronze medal – third place	2019 Tashkent	‍–‍66 kg
Islamic Solidarity Games
Gold medal – first place	2021 Konya	‍–‍66 kg

Profile at external databases
- IJF: 27982
- JudoInside.com: 69381
- Updated on 28 July 2024

Sardor Nurillaev (born 12 November 1994) is an Uzbekistani judoka. He won the gold medal in the men's 66 kg event at the 2021 Asian-Pacific Judo Championships held in Bishkek, Kyrgyzstan.

Nurillaev competed at the World Judo Championships in 2017, 2018, 2019, 2021, 2022, 2023 and 2024. He won one of the bronze medals in the mixed team event at the 2021 World Judo Championships held in Budapest, Hungary.

Nurillaev competed in the men's 66 kg event at the 2020 Summer Olympics in Tokyo, Japan. He was eliminated in his first match.

Nurillaev won one of the bronze medals in his event at the 2022 Judo Grand Slam Antalya held in Antalya, Turkey.
