= Georgios Balarjishvili =

Cypriot judoka (born 2002)

Personal information
- Born: 23 September 2002 (age 24)
- Occupation: Judoka

Sport
- Country: Cyprus
- Sport: Judo
- Weight class: ‍–‍66 kg
- Rank: 2nd dan black belt

Achievements and titles
- World Champ.: R64 (2021, 2023, 2024, 2025, 2026)
- European Champ.: R16 (2021, 2023)
- Commonwealth Games: (gold) (2022)
Medal record
Men's judo
Representing Cyprus
IJF Grand Prix
Gold medal – first place	2025 Gold Coast	‍–‍66 kg
Bronze medal – third place	2023 Perth	‍–‍66 kg
Commonwealth Games
Gold medal – first place	2022 Birmingham	‍–‍66 kg
Silver medal – second place	2026 Glasgow	‍–‍66 kg

Profile at external databases
- IJF: 37462
- JudoInside.com: 112766
- Updated on 5 October 2026

Georgios Balarjishvili (Greek: Γεώργιος Μπαλαρτζισβίλι, Georgian: გიორგიოს ბალარჯიშვილი; born 23 September 2002) is a Cypriot judoka.

Balarjishvili won a gold medal at the 2022 Commonwealth Games in the 66 kg event after defeating Finlay Allan in the final. It was Cyprus' first ever Commonwealth Games gold medal in judo. He was also, at the age of nineteen, the second youngest winner ever beheind Craig Fallon in 2002. Prior to the Commonwealth Games, Balarjishvili had claimed a bronze medal at the Junior European Cup in Athens in 2022.
