= Imad Bassou =

Moroccan judoka (born 1993)

Personal information
- Nationality: Moroccan
- Born: 4 July 1993 (age 33)
- Occupation: Judoka

Sport
- Country: Morocco
- Sport: Judo
- Weight class: –66 kg

Achievements and titles
- Olympic Games: R16 (2016)
- World Champ.: R32 (2015, 2018, 2021)
- African Champ.: (gold) (2016)
Medal record
Men's judo
Representing Morocco
African Championships
Gold medal – first place	2016 Tunis	–66 kg
Silver medal – second place	2019 Cape Town	–66 kg
Bronze medal – third place	2015 Libreville	–66 kg
Bronze medal – third place	2018 Tunis	–66 kg
Bronze medal – third place	2020 Antananarivo	–66 kg
Bronze medal – third place	2022 Oran	–66 kg
African Junior Championships
Gold medal – first place	2011 Antananarivo	–55 kg
Bronze medal – third place	2012 Gaborone	–66 kg
Bronze medal – third place	2013 Algiers	–66 kg
Mediterranean Games
Bronze medal – third place	2018 Tarragona	–66 kg

Profile at external databases
- IJF: 3754
- JudoInside.com: 72093
- Updated on 29 May 2022

Imad Bassou (born 4 July 1993) is a Moroccan judoka.

He competed at the 2016 Summer Olympics in Rio de Janeiro, in the men's 66 kg.

His brother Issam Bassou is also a judoka.

In 2021, he competed in the men's 66 kg event at the 2021 Judo World Masters held in Doha, Qatar.
