= Takeshi Takeoka =

Japanese judoka (born 1996)

Personal information
- Native name: たけおか たけし
- Born: 5 June 1999 (age 27) Osaka Prefecture, Honshu, Japan
- Occupation: Judoka
- Height: 169 cm (5 ft 7 in)

Sport
- Country: Japan
- Sport: Judo
- Weight class: ‍–‍66 kg

Achievements and titles
- World Champ.: (gold) (2025)
- Highest world ranking: 1^{st}
Medal record
Men's judo
Representing Japan
World Championships
Gold medal – first place	2025 Budapest	‍–‍66 kg
Silver medal – second place	2024 Abu Dhabi	‍–‍66 kg
Bronze medal – third place	2026 Baku	‍–‍66 kg
IJF Grand Slam
Gold medal – first place	2024 Paris	‍–‍66 kg
Gold medal – first place	2024 Tokyo	‍–‍66 kg
Gold medal – first place	2025 Baku	‍–‍66 kg
Gold medal – first place	2026 Paris	‍–‍66 kg
Gold medal – first place	2026 Ulaanbaatar	‍–‍66 kg
Silver medal – second place	2023 Baku	‍–‍66 kg
Bronze medal – third place	2025 Tokyo	‍–‍66 kg
World Juniors Championships
Silver medal – second place	2019 Marrakesh	‍–‍66 kg

Profile at external databases
- IJF: 57666
- JudoInside.com: 110329
- Updated on 6 October 2026

Takeshi Takeoka (Japanese: たけおか たけし, romanized: Takeoka Takeshi; born 5 June 1999) is a Japanese judoka and judo World Champion.

He participated at the 2024 World Championships, winning silver medals in both. One year later, he won the gold medal in that same weight category at the 2025 World Championships.

In the semi-finals at the 2025 Judo Grand Slam Tokyo, he faced off against his Park24 teammate and two-time Olympic champion, Hifumi Abe. After a tense match that ran over 8 minutes into golden score, Abe scored a waza-ari with sasae-tsurikomi-ashi, defeating Takeoka. Takeoka then defeated Tajikstan's Obid Dzhebov in order to claim a bronze medal at the event.
