= Abderrahmane Boushita =

Moroccan judoka (born 1997)

Personal information
- Born: 5 September 1997 (age 29) Rabat, Morocco
- Occupation: Judoka

Sport
- Country: Morocco
- Sport: Judo
- Weight class: ‍–‍66 kg

Achievements and titles
- Olympic Games: R32 (2024)
- World Champ.: R32 (2017, 2018, 2021, 2022, 2024)
- African Champ.: (silver) (2022, 2023)
Medal record
Men's judo
Representing Morocco
African Games
Silver medal – second place	2019 Rabat	‍–‍66 kg
African Championships
Silver medal – second place	2022 Oran	‍–‍66 kg
Silver medal – second place	2023 Casablanca	‍–‍66 kg
Bronze medal – third place	2021 Dakar	‍–‍66 kg
Bronze medal – third place	2025 Abidjan	‍–‍66 kg
Bronze medal – third place	2026 Nairobi	‍–‍66 kg
IJF Grand Prix
Gold medal – first place	2023 Perth	‍–‍66 kg
Islamic Solidarity Games
Silver medal – second place	2021 Konya	‍–‍66 kg
African Junior Championships
Bronze medal – third place	2014 Tunis	‍–‍55 kg
Bronze medal – third place	2016 Casablanca	‍–‍66 kg

Profile at external databases
- IJF: 11338
- JudoInside.com: 90475
- Updated on 26 April 2026

Abderrahmane Boushita (Arabic: عبد الرحمن بوشيطة, born 5 September 1997) is a Moroccan judoka. He represented Morocco at the 2019 African Games. Competing in the judo event, he won a silver medal in the men's ‍–‍66 kg category.

Boushita also competed in men's 66 kg events at the 2017, 2018 and 2019 World Judo Championships.

At the 2021 African Judo Championships held in Dakar, Senegal, Boushita won one of the bronze medals in the men's 66 kg event.

He was defeated by Israeli judoka Baruch Shmailov in the first round of the 2024 Paris Olympics. After Boushita lost, he walked off the mat without shaking the hand of Shmailov.
