= Artur Te =

Kyrgyzstani judoka (born 1993)

Personal information
- Born: 21 May 1993 (age 33)

Sport
- Country: Kyrgyzstan
- Sport: Judo
- Weight class: 66 kg
Medal record
Men's judo
Representing Kyrgyzstan
Asian Games
Bronze medal – third place	2018 Jakarta	66 kg
Asian Judo Championships
Bronze medal – third place	2019 Fujairah	66 kg

Artur Te (born 21 May 1993) is a Kyrgyzstani judoka. He competed at the World Judo Championships in 2017, 2018 and 2019.

In 2018, he won one of the bronze medals in the men's 66 kg event at the Asian Games held in Jakarta, Indonesia. At the 2019 Asian-Pacific Judo Championships held in Fujairah, United Arab Emirates, he won one of the bronze medals in the men's 66 kg event.
