= Patrick Edwin =

Nigerian judoka (born 2001)

Personal information
- Nationality: Nigeria
- Born: 19 October 2001 (age 24)

Sport
- Sport: Judo
- Event: 66 kg

Patrick Edwin (born 19 October 2001) is a Nigerian judoka, who competed in the half-heavyweight category.

He competed for Nigeria at local and international judo competitions.

== Achievements ==
Edwin represented Nigeria at the 2022 Commonwealth Games in England.

He lost to Nathon Burns of Northern Ireland through Ippon in the men's 66kg Judo game.

He was among the Nigerian team that won medals in the African judo international championships in Niger republic in 2018. He was also part of the Nigeria Team selected to compete in the Africa Youth Games in Algeria in 2018.

He also participated in the African Senior Championships 2021.
