= Julien Frascadore =

Canadian judoka (born 1999)

Personal information
- Born: 17 November 1999 (age 26)
- Occupation: Judoka

Sport
- Country: Canada
- Sport: Judo
- Weight class: ‍–‍66 kg

Achievements and titles
- World Champ.: R32 (2026)
- Pan American Champ.: (gold) (2023)
- Commonwealth Games: (gold) (2026)
Medal record
Men's judo
Representing Canada
Pan American Games
| Silver medal – second place | 2023 Santiago | ‍–‍66 kg |
Pan American Championships
| Gold medal – first place | 2023 Calgary | ‍–‍66 kg |
| Bronze medal – third place | 2025 Santiago | ‍–‍66 kg |
IJF Grand Prix
| Silver medal – second place | 2025 Lima | ‍–‍66 kg |
Commonwealth Games
| Gold medal – first place | 2026 Glasgow | ‍–‍66 kg |

Profile at external databases
- IJF: 29704
- JudoInside.com: 94585
- Updated on 5 October 2026

Julien Frascadore (born 17 November 1999) is a Canadian Judoka. He won a gold medal at the 2026 Commonwealth Games in the men's 66 kg division. He was a silver medalist at the 2023 Pan American Games.

== Biography ==
From Quebec City, Frascadore won a silver medal at the 2023 Pan American Games in Santiago, Chile having faced Willis Garcia of Venezuela in the final of the -66 kg competition. He also won the gold medal at the Pan American Judo Championships, in 2023 in Calgary.

In April 2025, he won the bronze medal in the -66 kg division at the 2025 Pan American-Oceania Judo Championships held in Santiago, Chile, following victory over Argentina's Joaquin Tovagliari. In October 2025, Frascadore won his first Grand Prix medal at the Lima, Peru Grand Prix.

In July 2026, in the 66kg division at the 2026 Commonwealth Games in Glasgow, Scotland.
