= Yeldos Zhumakanov =

Kazakhstani judoka (born 1990)

Personal information
- Born: 29 August 1990 (age 35)
- Occupation: Judoka

Sport
- Country: Kazakhstan
- Sport: Judo
- Weight class: ‍–‍66 kg

Achievements and titles
- World Champ.: 5th (2015, 2021)
- Asian Champ.: (silver) (2017, 2019)
Medal record
Men's judo
Representing Kazakhstan
Asian Games
| Silver medal – second place | 2018 Jakarta | Mixed team |
| Bronze medal – third place | 2018 Jakarta | ‍–‍66 kg |
Asian Championships
| Silver medal – second place | 2017 Hong Kong | ‍–‍66 kg |
| Silver medal – second place | 2019 Fujairah | ‍–‍66 kg |
| Bronze medal – third place | 2015 Kuwait City | ‍–‍66 kg |
| Bronze medal – third place | 2016 Tashkent | ‍–‍66 kg |
| Bronze medal – third place | 2021 Bishkek | ‍–‍66 kg |
World Masters
| Silver medal – second place | 2017 Saint Petersburg | ‍–‍66 kg |
IJF Grand Prix
| Gold medal – first place | 2013 Almaty | ‍–‍66 kg |
| Silver medal – second place | 2019 Budapest | ‍–‍66 kg |
| Bronze medal – third place | 2016 Almaty | ‍–‍66 kg |
| Bronze medal – third place | 2018 Hohhot | ‍–‍66 kg |

Profile at external databases
- IJF: 11665
- JudoInside.com: 70453
- Updated on 20 November 2022

Yeldos Zhumakanov (born 29 August 1990) is a Kazakhstani judoka. He competed at the World Judo Championships in 2015, 2017, 2019 and 2021.

In 2018, Zhumakanov won one of the bronze medals in the men's 66 kg event at the 2018 Asian Games held in Jakarta, Indonesia. At the 2019 Asian-Pacific Judo Championships held in Fujairah, United Arab Emirates, he won the silver medal in the men's 66 kg event.

In 2021, Zhumakanov competed in the men's 66 kg event at the Judo World Masters held in Doha, Qatar. A few months later, he won one of the bronze medals in this event at the 2021 Asian-Pacific Judo Championships held in Bishkek, Kyrgyzstan.
