= Obid Dzhebov =

Tajikistani judoka (born 1998)

Personal information
- Born: 30 March 1998 (age 28)
- Occupation: Judoka

Sport
- Country: Tajikistan
- Sport: Judo
- Weight class: ‍–‍66 kg

Achievements and titles
- World Champ.: (bronze) (2025)
- Asian Champ.: (silver) (2026)
Medal record
Men's judo
Representing Tajikistan
World Championships
Bronze medal – third place	2025 Budapest	‍–‍66 kg
Asian Championships
Silver medal – second place	2026 Ordos City	‍–‍66 kg
Bronze medal – third place	2025 Bangkok	‍–‍66 kg
IJF Grand Slam
Silver medal – second place	2023 Ulaanbaatar	‍–‍66 kg
Silver medal – second place	2024 Dushanbe	‍–‍66 kg
Silver medal – second place	2025 Dushanbe	‍–‍66 kg
Bronze medal – third place	2024 Antalya	‍–‍66 kg
Bronze medal – third place	2024 Abu Dhabi	‍–‍66 kg
Bronze medal – third place	2024 Tokyo	‍–‍66 kg
IJF Grand Prix
Gold medal – first place	2023 Dushanbe	‍–‍66 kg
Silver medal – second place	2025 Qingdao	‍–‍66 kg
Representing Russia
Military World Games
Gold medal – first place	2019 Wuhan	Men's team

Profile at external databases
- IJF: 72259
- JudoInside.com: 106288
- Updated on 5 September 2026

Obid Dzhebov (born 30 March 1998) is a judoka. He represented Russia until 2019 when he switched to Tajikistan. He won a bronze medal at the 2025 World Judo Championships.

== Career ==
Until 2019, Dzhebov competed in international tournaments under the Russia banner in the 60kg class where he won a gold medal in the 2019 Military World Games in the men's team event. After changing his nationality to Tajikistan, he won his first IJF World Judo Tour title in the 66kg class at the 2023 Judo Grand Prix Dushanbe. He was unable to compete in the 2024 Summer Olympics after losing the selection to his rival Nurali Emomali. At the 2025 World Championships, Dzhebov defeated two-time Olympic champion Hifumi Abe by ippon with an uchimata sukashi in the quarterfinals, becoming the first foreign athlete in the same weight class to defeat Abe since Manuel Lombardo of Italy at the 2019 Judo Grand Slam Paris, five years prior. He was defeated by Emomali by waza-ari in the semifinals but still finished in third place.

At the 2026 Asian Championships, Dzhebov was defeated by Emomali in the final, coming in second place. After Irakli Uznadze was appointed head coach of the Tajikistan national team on 5 June, Dzhebov was suspended four months in July for refusing to attend national training camps, follow the team's preparation programme and responding to requests from the coaching staff under Uznadze.
