= Serdar Rahimov =

Turkmen judoka (born 2004)

Personal information
- Born: 12 February 2004 (age 22)
- Occupation: Judoka

Sport
- Country: Turkmenistan
- Sport: Judo
- Weight class: ‍–‍66 kg

Achievements and titles
- Olympic Games: R16 (2024)
- World Champ.: R32 (2024, 2026)
- Asian Champ.: R32 (2024)
Medal record
Men's judo
Representing Turkmenistan
IJF Grand Slam
Gold medal – first place	2024 Dushanbe	‍–‍66 kg

Profile at external databases
- IJF: 61567
- JudoInside.com: 155449
- Updated on 5 October 2026

Serdar Rahimov (Turkmen: Serdar Rahimow; born 12 February 2004) is a judoka from Turkmenistan.

== Early life ==
From the Lebap Region, he was schooled in Judo in Hojambaz.

== Career ==
He won the Junior European Cup in Sarajevo in March 2023 in the 66 kg category.

In February 2024, he won silver at the Warsaw European Open in Poland, in the weight category up to 66 kg. In May 2024, he won the 2024 Dushanbe Grand Slam in Tajikistan. It was the first ever Turkmenistan gold medal at a grand slam tournament. With the win he gained an automatic place at the Olympic Games.

In June 2024, he officially selected for the 2024 Paris Olympics.
