= Finlay Allan =

British judoka

Personal information
- Nationality: British (Scottish)
- Born: 6 November 2001 (age 24) Scotland

Sport
- Sport: Judo
- Event: -66kg
- Club: Camberley Judo Club
Medal record
Men's judo
Representing Scotland
Commonwealth Games
Silver medal – second place	2022 Birmingham	-66 kg

Finlay Allan (born 6 November 2001) is a Scottish international judoka. He has represented Scotland at the Commonwealth Games and won a silver medal.

== Biography ==
Allan based at Camberley Judo Club finished in 7th place at 2021 Junior European Cup.

In 2022, he was selected for the 2022 Commonwealth Games in Birmingham, where he competed in the men's -66 kg category, winning the silver medal.
