= David García Torné =

Spanish judoka (born 1997)

Personal information
- Born: 4 August 1997 (age 29)
- Occupation: Judoka

Sport
- Country: Spain
- Sport: Judo
- Weight class: ‍–‍66 kg

Achievements and titles
- Olympic Games: R32 (2024)
- World Champ.: (silver) (2026)
- European Champ.: (silver) (2023)
Medal record
Men's judo
Representing Spain
World Championships
Silver medal – second place	2026 Baku	‍–‍66 kg
European Championships
Silver medal – second place	2023 Montpellier	‍–‍66 kg
IJF Grand Slam
Gold medal – first place	2023 Astana	‍–‍66 kg
Bronze medal – third place	2022 Baku	‍–‍66 kg
Bronze medal – third place	2023 Antalya	‍–‍66 kg
Bronze medal – third place	2023 Baku	‍–‍66 kg
Bronze medal – third place	2024 Paris	‍–‍66 kg
Bronze medal – third place	2026 Lausanne	‍–‍66 kg
IJF Grand Prix
Gold medal – first place	2023 Linz	‍–‍66 kg
Gold medal – first place	2025 Zagreb	‍–‍66 kg
Bronze medal – third place	2026 Linz	‍–‍66 kg
European U23 Championships
Bronze medal – third place	2019 Izhevsk	‍–‍66 kg

Profile at external databases
- IJF: 23870
- JudoInside.com: 89704
- Updated on 5 October 2026

David García Torné (born 4 August 1997) is a Spanish judoka. Torné won a silver medal at the 2023 European Championships in the men's 66 kg category. A protégé of Joaquín Ruiz, who has trained Nikoloz Sherazadishvili and Fran Garrigós among others, Torné represented Spain at the 2024 Summer Olympics. Participating in the men's 66 kg judo event, he was eliminated after losing to Gusman Kyrgyzbayev of Kazakhstan. He won gold in the men's 66 kg category at the 2025 Zagreb Grand Prix.

== Personal life ==
Torné is a graduate of the Facultad de Ciencias de la Actividad Física y del Deporte in Madrid.
