= Kubanychbek Aibek Uulu =

Kyrgyz judoka

Personal information
- Born: 28 October 2000 (age 25)
- Occupation: Judoka

Sport
- Country: Kyrgyzstan
- Sport: Judo
- Weight class: ‍–‍60 kg, ‍–‍66 kg

Achievements and titles
- Olympic Games: R32 (2024)
- World Champ.: 7th (2019)
- Asian Champ.: (bronze) (2021)
Medal record
Men's judo
Representing Kyrgyzstan
Asian Championships
Bronze medal – third place	2021 Bishkek	‍–‍60 kg
IJF Grand Slam
Gold medal – first place	2023 Tbilisi	‍–‍66 kg
Asian Junior Championships
Gold medal – first place	2018 Beirut	‍–‍55 kg
Silver medal – second place	2019 Taipei	‍–‍60 kg
Asian Cadet Championships
Silver medal – second place	2017 Chirchik	‍–‍55 kg
Bronze medal – third place	2017 Bishkek	‍–‍50 kg

Profile at external databases
- IJF: 29633
- JudoInside.com: 113255
- Updated on 16 November 2025

Kubanychbek Aibek Uulu (born 28 October 2000 ) is a Kyrgyzstani judoka. At the 2023 Tbilisi Grand Slam, Aibek Uulu became the first Kyrgyzstani judoka to win a world tour event. He placed 7th at the 2023 Paris Grand Slam.

Selected to represent Kyrgyzstan at the 2024 Summer Olympics, he lost in the men's 66 kg judo event in the first round to Bogdan Iadov of Ukraine.
