= Nurali Emomali =

Tajikistani judoka (born 2002)

Personal information
- Born: 8 April 2002 (age 24) Hiloli, Khuroson District, Tajikistan
- Occupation: Judoka

Sport
- Country: Tajikistan
- Sport: Judo
- Weight class: ‍–‍66 kg

Achievements and titles
- Olympic Games: 7th (2024)
- World Champ.: (silver) (2025)
- Asian Champ.: (gold) (2026)
- Highest world ranking: 1^{st}
Medal record
Men's judo
Representing Tajikistan
World Championships
Silver medal – second place	2025 Budapest	‍–‍66 kg
Asian Championships
Gold medal – first place	2026 Ordos City	‍–‍66 kg
Bronze medal – third place	2025 Bangkok	‍–‍66 kg
IJF Grand Slam
Gold medal – first place	2023 Tashkent	‍–‍66 kg
Gold medal – first place	2024 Tashkent	‍–‍66 kg
Gold medal – first place	2025 Dushanbe	‍–‍66 kg
Gold medal – first place	2026 Dushanbe	‍–‍66 kg
Silver medal – second place	2024 Antalya	‍–‍66 kg
Bronze medal – third place	2026 Tashkent	‍–‍66 kg
World Juniors Championships
Gold medal – first place	2022 Guayaquil	‍–‍66 kg

Profile at external databases
- IJF: 67712
- JudoInside.com: 155447
- Updated on 2 May 2026

Nurali Emomali (born 8 April 2002) is a Tajikistani judoka. He represented Tajikistan at the 2024 Olympic Games and won a silver medal at the 2025 World Championships.

== Early life ==
From Hiloli, in the Khuroson district, he started training in sports when he was eight years-old, trained by his father who coached many youngsters aim his district, and started competing in Judo when he was 12 years-old. He attended Tajik State University of Commerce where he studied law.

== Career ==
Age-group champion of Tajikistan when he was 19 years-old, Emomali had a third place finish in Uzbekistan at the Asian Youth Judo Championship in 2022. He won the gold medal in the 66 kg category at the 2022 World Juniors Championships in Guayaquil, Ecuador.

Emomali represented Tajikistan in the men's 66 kg division at the 2024 Summer Olympics in Paris, France, defeating Baruch Shmailov in the round‑of‑16 before suffering an injury against Hifumi Abe in the quarterfinals and ultimately having to withdraw from the competition.

Emomali won the silver medal in the 66 kg category at the 2025 World Championships in Budapest, Hungary, in June 2025, having faced-off against Takeshi Takeoka of Japan in the final.
