= Walide Khyar =

French judoka (born 1995)

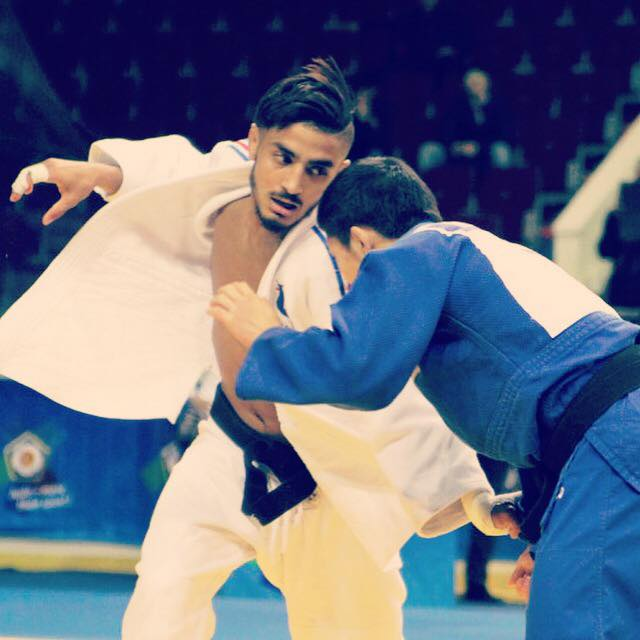

Personal information
- Born: 9 June 1995 (age 31) Bondy, France
- Occupation: Judoka
- Height: 171 cm (5 ft 7 in)
- Website: walidekhyar.fr

Sport
- Country: France
- Sport: Judo
- Weight class: ‍–‍60 kg, ‍–‍66 kg

Achievements and titles
- Olympic Games: 5th (2024)
- World Champ.: (bronze) (2023)
- European Champ.: (gold) (2016)
Medal record
Men's judo
Representing France
Olympic Games
Gold medal – first place	2024 Paris	Mixed team
World Championships
Bronze medal – third place	2023 Doha	‍–‍66 kg
European Championships
Gold medal – first place	2016 Kazan	‍–‍60 kg
Bronze medal – third place	2023 Montpellier	‍–‍66 kg
Bronze medal – third place	2025 Podgorica	‍–‍66 kg
Bronze medal – third place	2026 Tbilisi	‍–‍66 kg
World Masters
Bronze medal – third place	2022 Jerusalem	‍–‍66 kg
IJF Grand Slam
Gold medal – first place	2025 Abu Dhabi	‍–‍66 kg
Silver medal – second place	2019 Abu Dhabi	‍–‍60 kg
Silver medal – second place	2021 Antalya	‍–‍60 kg
Bronze medal – third place	2016 Paris	‍–‍60 kg
Bronze medal – third place	2021 Paris	‍–‍66 kg
Bronze medal – third place	2023 Tashkent	‍–‍66 kg
Bronze medal – third place	2024 Antalya	‍–‍66 kg
Bronze medal – third place	2025 Paris	‍–‍66 kg
IJF Grand Prix
Gold medal – first place	2018 Tunis	‍–‍60 kg
Silver medal – second place	2019 Tbilisi	‍–‍60 kg
Bronze medal – third place	2015 Qingdao	‍–‍60 kg
World Juniors Championships
Bronze medal – third place	2015 Abu Dhabi	‍–‍60 kg
European Junior Championships
Gold medal – first place	2015 Oberwart	‍–‍60 kg
Bronze medal – third place	2014 Bucharest	‍–‍60 kg
European Cadet Championships
Silver medal – second place	2011 Cottonera	‍–‍50 kg

Profile at external databases
- IJF: 7613
- JudoInside.com: 67277
- Updated on 18 April 2026

Walide Khyar (born 9 June 1995) is a French judoka. He competed at the 2016 Summer Olympics in the men's 60 kg event, in which he was eliminated in the second round by Felipe Kitadai.

In 2021, he won the silver medal in his event at the 2021 Judo Grand Slam Antalya held in Antalya, Turkey.

== Personal life ==
Kyar was born in Bondy, in the Seine-Saint-Denis department. He is of Moroccan descent.
