= Jasleen Singh Saini =

Indian judoka

Personal information
- Born: 10 October 1997 (age 28) Gurdaspur, Punjab, India
- Height: 1.70 m (5 ft 7 in)
- Weight: 66 kg (146 lb)

Sport
- Sport: Judo
- Event: Men's 66 kilograms
Medal record
Men's Judo
Representing India
South Asian Games
Gold medal – first place	2016 Guwahati	66 kg
Gold medal – first place	2019 Kathmandu	66 kg

Jasleen Singh Saini (born 10 October 1997) is an Indian judoka who competes in the 66 kg weight class.
