= Luukas Saha =

Finnish judoka (born 1988)

Personal information
- Born: 7 July 1998 (age 27)
- Occupation: Judoka
- Website: sahajudo.fi

Sport
- Country: Finland
- Sport: Judo
- Weight class: ‍–‍66 kg

Achievements and titles
- Olympic Games: R16 (2024)
- World Champ.: (bronze) (2024)
- European Champ.: (silver) (2026)
Medal record
Men's judo
Representing Finland
World Championships
Bronze medal – third place	2024 Abu Dhabi	‍–‍66 kg
European Championships
Silver medal – second place	2026 Tbilisi	‍–‍66 kg
Bronze medal – third place	2025 Podgorica	‍–‍66 kg
IJF Grand Slam
Bronze medal – third place	2024 Astana	‍–‍66 kg
IJF Grand Prix
Silver medal – second place	2025 Guadalajara	‍–‍66 kg

Profile at external databases
- IJF: 20137
- JudoInside.com: 85388
- Updated on 18 April 2026

Luukas Saha (born 7 July 1998) is a Finnish judoka. At the 2024 World Championships in Abu Dhabi, Saha became the first Finn to medal in the event since Juha Salonen in 1981. He represented Finland at the 2024 Summer Olympics where he competed in the men's 66 kg judo event. After defeating Muhammed Demirel of Turkey in the first round, he lost to Denis Vieru of Moldova in the second round. After the loss to Vieru, Saha was comforted by Alexander Stubb, the President of Finland.

== Personal life ==
Outside of judo, Saha enjoys fishing.
