= Daikii Bouba =

French judoka (born 1996)

Daïkii Bouba
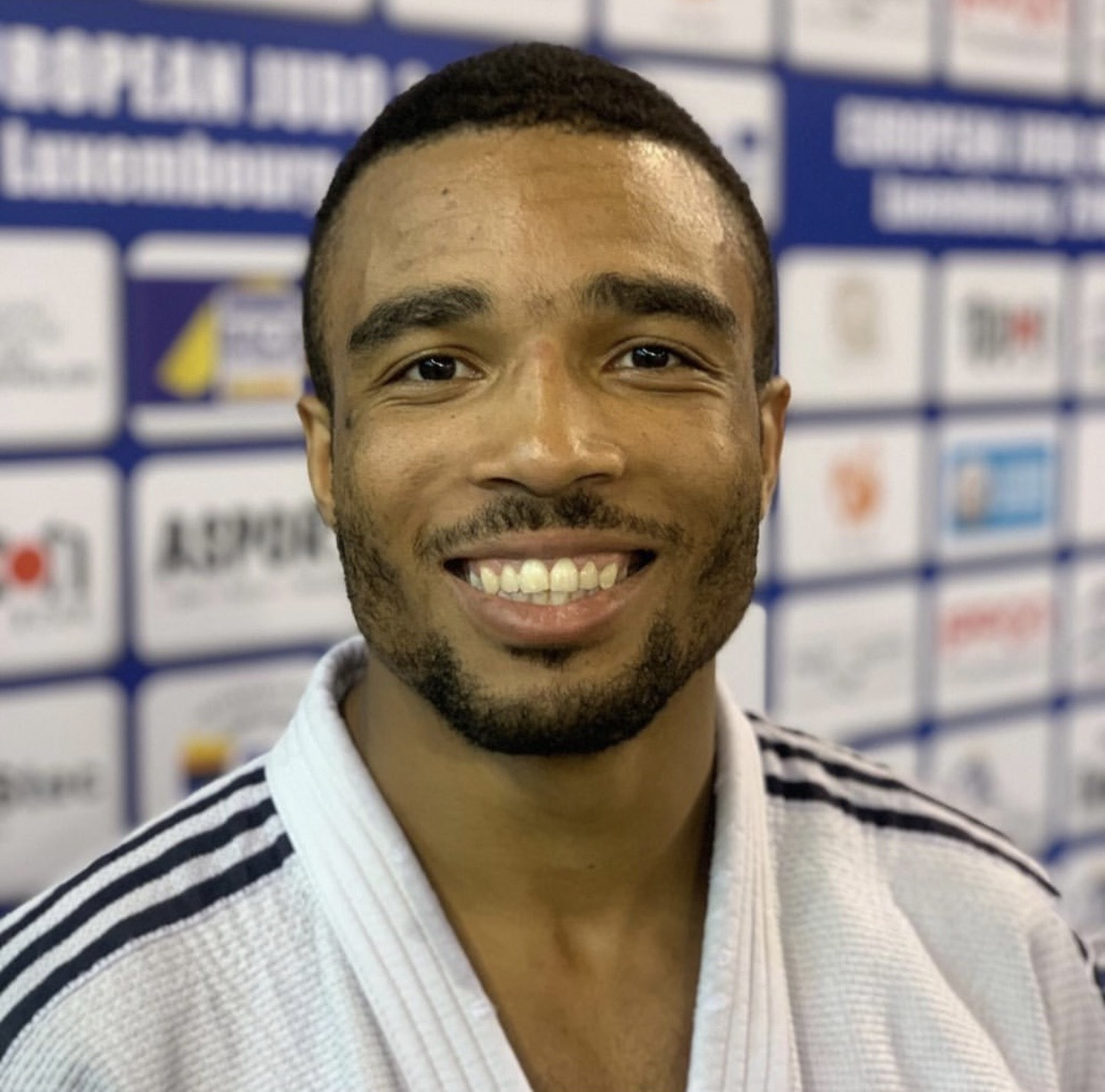

Personal information
- Born: 18 March 1996 (age 30) Paris, France
- Occupation: Judoka

Sport
- Country: France
- Sport: Judo
- Weight class: ‍–‍66 kg

Achievements and titles
- World Champ.: R16 (2024)
- European Champ.: (gold) (2025)
- Highest world ranking: 6
Medal record
Men's judo
Representing France
European Championships
Gold medal – first place	2025 Podgorica	‍–‍66 kg
World Masters
Silver medal – second place	2022 Jerusalem	‍–‍66 kg
IJF Grand Slam
Silver medal – second place	2024 Baku	‍–‍66 kg
Silver medal – second place	2024 Abu Dhabi	‍–‍66 kg
Silver medal – second place	2025 Paris	‍–‍66 kg
IJF Grand Prix
Silver medal – second place	2022 Perth	‍–‍66 kg
Bronze medal – third place	2023 Almada	‍–‍66 kg
Bronze medal – third place	2025 Guadalajara	‍–‍66 kg

Profile at external databases
- IJF: 13297
- JudoInside.com: 81620
- Updated on 19 October 2025

Daïkii Bouba (born 18 March 1996) is a French judoka who competes in the men's half-lightweight (66 kg) division.

He won the silver medal at the 2022 Judo World Masters competition in Jerusalem, and is the gold medallist of the 2025 European Judo Championships in the ‍–‍66 kg category.
