= Ayoub El-Idrissi =

Qatari judoka (born 1994)

Personal information
- Nationality: Qatar
- Born: 23 October 1994 (age 30)
- Occupation: Judoka

Sport
- Sport: Judo
- Weight class: –66 kg

Profile at external databases
- IJF: 41160
- JudoInside.com: 78802
- Updated on 31 October 2021

Ayoub El-Idrissi (born 23 October 1994) is a Qatari judoka. He competed in the 2020 Summer Olympics.
