= Murad Chopanov =

Russian judoka (born 1998)

Personal information
- Native name: Мурад Османович Чопанов
- Full name: Murad Osmanovich Chopanov
- Born: 18 September 1998 (age 28)
- Occupation: Judoka

Sport
- Country: Russia
- Sport: Judo
- Weight class: ‍–‍66 kg

Achievements and titles
- World Champ.: 5th (2026)
- European Champ.: (gold) (2026)
Medal record
Men's judo
Representing Russia
World Championships
Silver medal – second place	2026 Baku	Mixed team
European Championships
Gold medal – first place	2026 Tbilisi	‍–‍66 kg
IJF Grand Slam
Gold medal – first place	2021 Kazan	‍–‍66 kg
Silver medal – second place	2025 Abu Dhabi	‍–‍66 kg
Bronze medal – third place	2021 Antalya	‍–‍66 kg
European U23 Championships
Gold medal – first place	2019 Izhevsk	‍–‍66 kg
World Juniors Championships
Bronze medal – third place	2018 Nassau	‍–‍66 kg
European Junior Championships
Silver medal – second place	2018 Sofia	‍–‍66 kg
Representing Individual Neutral Athletes
IJF Grand Slam
Gold medal – first place	2024 Astana	‍–‍66 kg
Bronze medal – third place	2024 Tashkent	‍–‍66 kg
IJF Grand Prix
Silver medal – second place	2023 Dushanbe	‍–‍66 kg
Representing the IJF
European Championships
Silver medal – second place	2025 Podgorica	‍–‍66 kg
IJF Grand Slam
Gold medal – first place	2024 Abu Dhabi	‍–‍66 kg

Profile at external databases
- IJF: 21401
- JudoInside.com: 57126
- Updated on 5 October 2026

Murad Osmanovich Chopanov (born 18 September 1998) is a Russian judoka.

Chopanov is the gold medalist of the 2021 Kazan Grand Slam in the ‍–‍66 kg category.
