= Denis Vieru =

Moldovan judoka (born 1996)

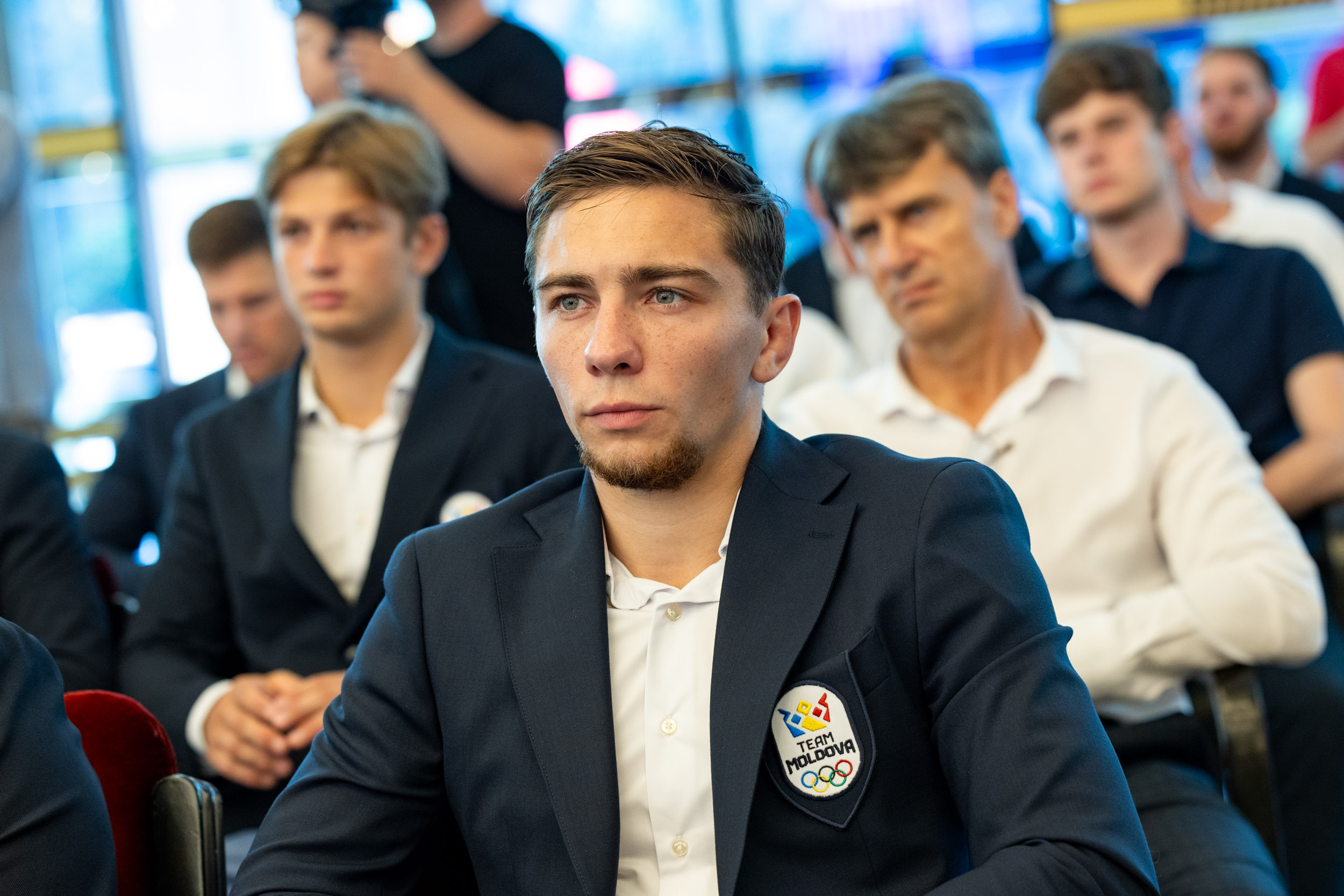
- Vieru in 2024

Personal information
- Born: 10 March 1996 (age 30) Chișinău, Moldova
- Occupation: Judoka
- Height: 168 cm (5 ft 6 in)

Sport
- Country: Moldova
- Sport: Judo
- Weight class: ‍–‍66 kg

Achievements and titles
- Olympic Games: (bronze) (2024)
- World Champ.: (bronze) (2019, 2022, 2026)
- European Champ.: (gold) (2023)
Medal record
Men's judo
Representing Moldova
Olympic Games
Bronze medal – third place	2024 Paris	‍–‍66 kg
World Championships
Bronze medal – third place	2019 Tokyo	‍–‍66 kg
Bronze medal – third place	2022 Tashkent	‍–‍66 kg
Bronze medal – third place	2026 Baku	‍–‍66 kg
European Championships
Gold medal – first place	2023 Montpellier	‍–‍66 kg
Bronze medal – third place	2020 Prague	‍–‍66 kg
Bronze medal – third place	2022 Sofia	‍–‍66 kg
World Masters
Silver medal – second place	2023 Budapest	‍–‍66 kg
Bronze medal – third place	2022 Jerusalem	‍–‍66 kg
IJF Grand Slam
Gold medal – first place	2019 Paris	‍–‍66 kg
Gold medal – first place	2019 Baku	‍–‍66 kg
Gold medal – first place	2021 Abu Dhabi	‍–‍66 kg
Gold medal – first place	2022 Antalya	‍–‍66 kg
Gold medal – first place	2022 Tbilisi	‍–‍66 kg
Gold medal – first place	2022 Baku	‍–‍66 kg
Silver medal – second place	2021 Baku	‍–‍66 kg
Silver medal – second place	2025 Ulaanbaatar	‍–‍66 kg
Bronze medal – third place	2023 Paris	‍–‍66 kg
Bronze medal – third place	2023 Baku	‍–‍66 kg
Bronze medal – third place	2023 Tokyo	‍–‍66 kg
Bronze medal – third place	2026 Budapest	‍–‍66 kg
IJF Grand Prix
Gold medal – first place	2019 Antalya	‍–‍66 kg
Gold medal – first place	2021 Zagreb	‍–‍66 kg
Gold medal – first place	2022 Almada	‍–‍66 kg
Silver medal – second place	2018 Antalya	‍–‍66 kg
Silver medal – second place	2019 Zagreb	‍–‍66 kg
Silver medal – second place	2026 Lima	‍–‍66 kg
Bronze medal – third place	2018 Budapest	‍–‍66 kg
European U23 Championships
Gold medal – first place	2016 Tel Aviv	‍–‍66 kg
European Junior Championships
Bronze medal – third place	2015 Oberwart	‍–‍60 kg
World University Games
Gold medal – first place	2019 Naples	‍–‍66 kg

Profile at external databases
- IJF: 16235
- JudoInside.com: 27145
- Updated on 6 October 2026

Denis Vieru (born 10 March 1996) is a Moldovan judoka who competes in the men's half-lightweight (66 kg) category. He competed in the men's 66 kg event at the 2020 Summer Olympics in Tokyo, Japan, without winning a medal, but he won a bronze medal in the same event at the 2024 Summer Olympics in Paris, France.

== Career ==
Vieru rose to prominence after winning a gold medal at the 2016 European U23 Championships, the first Moldovan to do so since Marcel Trudov in 2005. Vieru won medals at a number of IJF Grand Prix and Grand Slam events in 2019, including Moldova's first Judo Grand Prix gold medal at the 2019 Antalya Grand Prix, another gold at the 2019 Baku Grand Slam, and defeated the 2016 European champion Vazha Margvelashvili to win gold at the 2019 Paris Grand Slam. He also defeated Ranto Katsura of Japan to win a gold medal at the 2019 Summer Universiade in Naples, where he was the flag bearer for the Moldovan delegation in the opening ceremony, and later also won a bronze medal at the 2019 World Championships.

Vieru's medal as well as his points from the 2019 summer's competitions were suspended for a while, while the Moldovan was investigated for suspected doping. However, Vieru and his advocates were able to prove that there was "neither will to doping, nor negligence" on the athlete's part, which meant that Vieru only received a three-month suspension instead of the regular two years, and was able to keep his medal and his world ranking points. The documents about the events have been sealed from the public.

At the 2021 Abu Dhabi Grand Slam held in Abu Dhabi, United Arab Emirates, Vieru won the gold medal in his event. He won the gold medal in his event at the 2022 Almada Grand Prix held in Almada, Portugal. Vieru became the 2023 European champion and as of May 2024 is also the world's top ranked judoka in his weight class (66 kg).

== Awards ==
- Order of Honour (Moldova) (2022)
- EJU Fairplay Award (2023)
