= 2023 World Judo Championships – Men's 66 kg =

Judo competition

Judo Men's 66 kg at the 2023 World Judo Championships
- Venue: Ali Bin Hamad Al Attiya Arena
- Location: Doha, Qatar
- Date: 8 May 2023
- Competitors: 55 from 41 nations
- Total prize money: €57,000

Medalists
gold medal	Hifumi Abe (4th title)	Japan
silver medal	Joshiro Maruyama	Japan
bronze medal	Yondonperenlein Baskhüü	Mongolia
bronze medal	Walide Khyar	France

Competition at external databases
- Links: IJF • JudoInside

The Men's 66 kg event at the 2023 World Judo Championships was held at the Ali Bin Hamad al-Attiyah Arena in Doha, Qatar on 8 May 2023.

== Results ==
=== Finals ===
Semi-finals
(France) Walide Khyar	00
(Japan) Hifumi Abe	10
(Mongolia) Yondonperenlein Baskhüü	00
(Japan) Joshiro Maruyama	01

Final
(Japan) Hifumi Abe	10
(Japan) Joshiro Maruyama	00

=== Repechage ===
Repechage
Yago Abuladze	00
(Georgia (country)) Vazha Margvelashvili	11
(Italy) Elios Manzi	00
(South Korea) An Ba-ul	10

Bronze medal
(Georgia (country)) Vazha Margvelashvili	00
(Mongolia) Yondonperenlein Baskhüü	01
(South Korea) An Ba-ul	00
(France) Walide Khyar	01

=== Pool A ===
First round
(United Kingdom) Charlie Young	00
(Israel) Tal Flicker	01
Yago Abuladze	02
(Turkmenistan) Serdar Rahymow	00
(Uzbekistan) Mukhriddin Tilovov	10
(Algeria) Wail Ezzine	00
(South Korea) An Jae-hong	00
(Ecuador) Lenin Preciado	10
(Serbia) Strahinja Bunčić	00
(Tajikistan) Nurali Emomali	11
~~(Bahrain) Ramazan Kodzhakov~~
(Brazil) Willian Lima	w/o

Round of 32
(Moldova) Denis Vieru	01
(Israel) Tal Flicker	00
Yago Abuladze	10
(Uzbekistan) Mukhriddin Tilovov	00
(France) Walide Khyar	01
(Ecuador) Lenin Preciado	00
(Tajikistan) Nurali Emomali	00
(Brazil) Willian Lima	11

Round of 16
(Moldova) Denis Vieru	00
Yago Abuladze	01
(France) Walide Khyar	01
(Brazil) Willian Lima	00

Quarter-finals
Yago Abuladze	00
(France) Walide Khyar	01

=== Pool B ===
First round
(Estonia) Oscar Pertelson	11
(Germany) Martin Setz	00
(Latvia) Anthony De Angelis	10
(Angola) Edmilson Pedro	00
(Morocco) Abderrahmane Boushita	00
(Mongolia) Battogtokhyn Erkhembayar	10
(Niger) Ismael Alhassane	00
(Italy) Matteo Piras	02
(Spain) Alberto Gaitero	10
(Australia) Nathan Katz	00
(Turkey) Muhammed Demirel	01
(United States) Ari Berliner	00

Round of 32
(Georgia (country)) Vazha Margvelashvili	01
(Estonia) Oscar Pertelson	00
(Latvia) Anthony De Angelis	00
(Mongolia) Battogtokhyn Erkhembayar	10
(Japan) Hifumi Abe	11
(Italy) Matteo Piras	00
(Spain) Alberto Gaitero	10
(Turkey) Muhammed Demirel	00

Round of 16
(Georgia (country)) Vazha Margvelashvili	01
(Mongolia) Battogtokhyn Erkhembayar	00
(Japan) Hifumi Abe	01
(Spain) Alberto Gaitero	00

Quarter-finals
(Georgia (country)) Vazha Margvelashvili	00
(Japan) Hifumi Abe	02

=== Pool C ===
First round
Abrek Naguchev	10
(Uzbekistan) Sardor Nurillaev	00
(Tajikistan) Shahboz Saidaburorov	11
(United Arab Emirates) Guram Dzavashvili	00
(Gabon) Fernand Nkero	00
(Romania) Lucian Borş Dumitrescu	11
(Egypt) Ahmed Abdelrahman	00
(France) Daikii Bouba	10
(Cyprus) Georgios Balarjishvili	00
(Bulgaria) Yanislav Gerchev	10

Round of 32
(Mongolia) Yondonperenlein Baskhüü	10
Abrek Naguchev	00
(Tajikistan) Shahboz Saidaburorov	00
(Romania) Lucian Borş Dumitrescu	10
(Azerbaijan) Orkhan Safarov	01
(France) Daikii Bouba	00
(Bulgaria) Yanislav Gerchev	00
(Italy) Elios Manzi	10

Round of 16
(Mongolia) Yondonperenlein Baskhüü	10
(Romania) Lucian Borş Dumitrescu	00
(Azerbaijan) Orkhan Safarov	00
(Italy) Elios Manzi	10

Quarter-finals
(Mongolia) Yondonperenlein Baskhüü	10
(Italy) Elios Manzi	00

=== Pool D ===
First round
(Kazakhstan) Gusman Kyrgyzbayev	10
(Peru) Juan Postigos	00
(Moldova) Radu Izvoreanu	10
(Germany) Lennart Slamberger	00
(Kyrgyzstan) Kubanychbek Aibek Uulu	00
(South Korea) An Ba-ul	10
(Slovakia) Matej Poliak	11
(United States) Isaiah Ramirez	00
(Zambia) Steven Mungandu	00
(Turkmenistan) Hekim Agamämmedow	01
(Spain) David García Torné	00
(Colombia) Juan Hernández	01

Round of 32
(Israel) Baruch Shmailov	00
(Kazakhstan) Gusman Kyrgyzbayev	01
(Moldova) Radu Izvoreanu	00
(South Korea) An Ba-ul	10
(Japan) Joshiro Maruyama	11
(Slovakia) Matej Poliak	00
(Turkmenistan) Hekim Agamämmedow	00
(Colombia) Juan Hernández	01

Round of 16
(Kazakhstan) Gusman Kyrgyzbayev	00
(South Korea) An Ba-ul	10
(Japan) Joshiro Maruyama	11
(Colombia) Juan Hernández	00

Quarter-finals
(South Korea) An Ba-ul	00
(Japan) Joshiro Maruyama	10

== Prize money ==
The sums listed bring the total prizes awarded to €57,000 for the individual event.

Medal	Total	Judoka	Coach
Gold	€26,000	€20,800	€5,200
Silver	€15,000	€12,000	€3,000
Bronze	€8,000	€6,400	€1,600
