= 2024 European Judo Championships – Men's 66 kg =

Judo competition

Judo Men's 66 kg at the 2024 European Judo Championships
- Venue: Arena Zagreb
- Location: Zagreb, Croatia
- Date: 25 April
- Competitors: 29 from 23 nations

Medalists
gold medal	Vazha Margvelashvili (2nd title)	Georgia
silver medal	Muhammed Demirel	Turkey
bronze medal	Bence Pongrácz	Hungary
bronze medal	Elios Manzi	Italy

Competition at external databases
- Links: IJF • JudoInside

The men's 66 kg competition at the 2024 European Judo Championships was held on 25 April at the Arena Zagreb.

== Results ==
=== Finals ===
Semi-finals
Muhammed Demirel (TUR)	01 (yellow card)
Elios Manzi (ITA)	00 (yellow card)
Vazha Margvelashvili (GEO)	11 (yellow card)
Alberto Gaitero (ESP)	00 (yellow card)

Final
Muhammed Demirel (TUR)	01
Vazha Margvelashvili (GEO)	02

=== Repechage ===
Repechage
Bence Pongrácz (HUN)	02
Bogdan Iadov (UKR)	00 (yellow card)
Matteo Piras (ITA)	w/o
Baruch Shmailov (ISR)

Bronze medal
Bence Pongrácz (HUN)	01
Alberto Gaitero (ESP)	00
Matteo Piras (ITA)	00
Elios Manzi (ITA)	01

=== Pool A ===
First round
Muhammed Demirel (TUR)	11
Luukas Saha (FIN)	00
Strahinja Bunčić (SRB)	10 (yellow card)
Georgios Balarjishvili (CYP)	00 (yellow card)
Nikola Zorotović (CRO)	00 (yellow card)
Bence Pongrácz (HUN)	02

Round of 16
Yashar Najafov (AZE)	00
Muhammed Demirel (TUR)	02
Strahinja Bunčić (SRB)	00
Bence Pongrácz (HUN)	02

Quarter-finals
Muhammed Demirel (TUR)	01 (yellow card)
Bence Pongrácz (HUN)	00

=== Pool B ===
First round
Bogdan Iadov (UKR)	10
Anthony De Angelis (LAT)	01
Oscar Pertelson (EST)	00
Tal Flicker (ISR)	01 (yellow card)
Elios Manzi (ITA)	01 (yellow card)
Samuel Hall (GBR)	00
Matej Poliak (SVK)	01
Yago Abuladze (AIN)	02

Round of 16
Bogdan Iadov (UKR)	01 (yellow card)
Tal Flicker (ISR)	00
Elios Manzi (ITA)	10
Yago Abuladze (AIN)	00 (yellow card)

Quarter-finals
Bogdan Iadov (UKR)	00
Elios Manzi (ITA)	01

=== Pool C ===
First round
Dani Klačar (CRO)	00 (yellow card)
Marcus Auer (AUT)	10
Matteo Piras (ITA)	10 (yellow card)
Konrad Shoka (AIN)	00
Mohammad Rashnonezhad (IRT)	01 (yellow card)
Radu Izvoreanu (MDA)	11

Round of 16
Vazha Margvelashvili (GEO)	10
Marcus Auer (AUT)	00
Matteo Piras (ITA)	02
Radu Izvoreanu (MDA)	00 (yellow card)

Quarter-finals
Vazha Margvelashvili (GEO)	11
Matteo Piras (ITA)	00

=== Pool D ===
First round
Mykyta Holoborodko (UKR)	00 (yellow card)
Yanislav Gerchev (BUL)	01
Baruch Shmailov (ISR)	01
Charlie Young (GBR)	00
Miguel Nery Gago (POR)	00
Martin Setz (GER)	10

Round of 16
Alberto Gaitero (ESP)	10 (yellow card)
Yanislav Gerchev (BUL)	00
Baruch Shmailov (ISR)	01 (yellow card)
Martin Setz (GER)	00 (yellow card)

Quarter-finals
Alberto Gaitero (ESP)	w/o
Baruch Shmailov (ISR)
