= 2022 European Judo Championships – Men's 66 kg =

Judo competition

Judo Men's 66 kg at the 2022 European Judo Championships
- Venue: Armeets Arena
- Location: Sofia, Bulgaria
- Date: 29 April
- Competitors: 33 from 22 nations

Medalists
gold medal	Bogdan Iadov (1st title)	Ukraine
silver medal	Alberto Gaitero Martin	Spain
bronze medal	Elios Manzi	Italy
bronze medal	Denis Vieru	Moldova

Competition at external databases
- Links: IJF • JudoInside

The men's 66 kg competition at the 2022 European Judo Championships was held on 29 April at the Armeets Arena.

== Results ==
=== Finals ===
Semi-finals
Denis Vieru (MDA)	00
Alberto Gaitero Martin (ESP)	10
Yashar Najafov (AZE)	00
Bogdan Iadov (UKR)	10

Final
Alberto Gaitero Martin (ESP)	00
Bogdan Iadov (UKR)	10

=== Repechage ===
Repechage
Yevhen Honcharko (UKR)	00
Elios Manzi (ITA)	10
Denislav Ivanov (BUL)	00
Baruch Shmailov (ISR)	10

Bronze medal
Elios Manzi (ITA)	10
Yashar Najafov (AZE)	00
Baruch Shmailov (ISR)	00
Denis Vieru (MDA)	10

=== Pool A ===
First round

Round of 32
Denis Vieru (MDA)	01
Daikii Bouba (FRA)	00
Freddy Waizenegger (SUI)	00
Robert Klačar (CRO)	10
Yevhen Honcharko (UKR)	10
Bozhidar Temelkov (BUL)	00
Louka Loukas (CYP)	00
Lennart Slamberger (GER)	10

Round of 16
Denis Vieru (MDA)	01
Robert Klačar (CRO)	00
Yevhen Honcharko (UKR)	11
Lennart Slamberger (GER)	00

Quarterfinals
Denis Vieru (MDA)	10
Yevhen Honcharko (UKR)	00

=== Pool B ===
First round

Round of 32
Tal Flicker (ISR)	10
Ibrahim Aliyev (AZE)	00
Elios Manzi (ITA)	10
Gregg Varey (GBR)	00
Alberto Gaitero Martin (ESP)	10
Jusuf Nurković (MNE)	00
Strahinja Bunčić (SRB)	01
Oscar Pertelson (EST)	00

Round of 16
Tal Flicker (ISR)	00
Elios Manzi (ITA)	10
Alberto Gaitero Martin (ESP)	10
Strahinja Bunčić (SRB)	00

Quarterfinals
Elios Manzi (ITA)	00
Alberto Gaitero Martin (ESP)	11

=== Pool C ===
First round
Georgios Balarjishvili (CYP)	00
Lucian Borş Dumitrescu (ROU)	10

Round of 32
Vazha Margvelashvili (GEO)	10
Lucian Borş Dumitrescu (ROU)	00
Andrej Klokov (LTU)	00
Denislav Ivanov (BUL)	10
Radu Izvoreanu (MDA)	00
Yashar Najafov (AZE)	10
Viljar Lipard (EST)	00
Orlando Cazorla (FRA)	10

Round of 16
Vazha Margvelashvili (GEO)	00
Denislav Ivanov (BUL)	01
Yashar Najafov (AZE)	10
Orlando Cazorla (FRA)	00

Quarterfinals
Denislav Ivanov (BUL)	00
Yashar Najafov (AZE)	01

=== Pool D ===
First round

Round of 32
Baruch Shmailov (ISR)	10
Alexander Short (GBR)	00
Adrián Nieto Chinarro (ESP)	10
Luukas Saha (FIN)	00
Bogdan Iadov (UKR)	10
Mattia Miceli (ITA)	00
Nathon Burns (IRL)	00
Ejder Toktay (TUR)	01

Round of 16
Baruch Shmailov (ISR)	10
Adrián Nieto Chinarro (ESP)	00
Bogdan Iadov (UKR)	11
Ejder Toktay (TUR)	00

Quarterfinals
Baruch Shmailov (ISR)	01
Bogdan Iadov (UKR)	10
