= Judo at the 2024 Summer Olympics – Men's 66 kg =

Judo Men's 66 kg at the Games of the XXXIII Olympiad
- Venue: Grand Palais Éphémère
- Location: Paris, France
- Date: 28 July 2024
- Competitors: 27 from 27 nations
- Website: Official website

Medalists
gold medal	Hifumi Abe (2nd title)	Japan
silver medal	Willian Lima	Brazil
bronze medal	Gusman Kyrgyzbayev	Kazakhstan
bronze medal	Denis Vieru	Moldova

Competition at external databases
- Links: IJF • JudoInside

The Men's 66 kg event in Judo at the 2024 Summer Olympics was held at the Grand Palais Éphémère in Paris, France on 28 July 2024.

== Summary ==
This is the seventh appearance of the men's half lightweight category.

Hifumi Abe defended his Olympic title, Vazha Margvelashvili lost to Walide Khyar in the round of 16, one of the bronze medalists, An Ba-ul won by beating 10-00 Bayanmönkhiin Narmandakh and lost to Gusman Kyrgyzbayev, Daniel Cargnin upgraded to lightweight.

== Results ==
=== Finals ===
Semi-finals
Denis Vieru (MDA)	00
Hifumi Abe (JPN)	01 (yellow card)
Gusman Kyrgyzbayev (KAZ)	00
Willian Lima (BRA)	10

Final
Hifumi Abe (JPN)	10
Willian Lima (BRA)	00

=== Repechage ===
Repechage
Strahinja Bunčić (SRB)	w/o
Nurali Emomali (TJK)	DNS
Walide Khyar (FRA)	01 (yellow card)
Yondonperenlein Baskhüü (MGL)	00 (yellow card)

Bronze medal
Strahinja Bunčić (SRB)	00
Gusman Kyrgyzbayev (KAZ)	01 (yellow card)
Walide Khyar (FRA)	00 (yellow card)
Denis Vieru (MDA)	01

=== Pool A ===
First round
Muhammed Demirel (TUR)	00
Luukas Saha (FIN)	01
Matteo Piras (ITA)	10 (yellow card)
Juan Postigos (PER)	00
Yashar Najafov (AZE)	00
Strahinja Bunčić (SRB)	01

Round of 16
Denis Vieru (MDA)	01 (yellow card)
Luukas Saha (FIN)	00
Matteo Piras (ITA)	00 (yellow card)
Strahinja Bunčić (SRB)	01

Quarter-finals
Denis Vieru (MDA)	10
Strahinja Bunčić (SRB)	00

=== Pool B ===
First round
Ismael Alhassane (NIG)	00 (yellow card)
Bence Pongrácz (HUN)	10
Baruch Shmailov (ISR)	01 (yellow card)
Abderrahmane Boushita (MAR)	00

Round of 16
Hifumi Abe (JPN)	10
Bence Pongrácz (HUN)	00
Nurali Emomali (TJK)	01
Baruch Shmailov (ISR)	00

Quarter-finals
Hifumi Abe (JPN)	10
Nurali Emomali (TJK)	00

=== Pool C ===
First round
Mohammad Rashnonezhad (EOR)	00
Walide Khyar (FRA)	10
David García Torné (ESP)	00 (yellow card)
Gusman Kyrgyzbayev (KAZ)	01
An Ba-ul (KOR)	10 (yellow card)
Bayanmönkhiin Narmandakh (UAE)	00 (yellow card)

Round of 16
Vazha Margvelashvili (GEO)	00 (yellow card)
Walide Khyar (FRA)	10 (yellow card)
Gusman Kyrgyzbayev (KAZ)	01
An Ba-ul (KOR)	00 (yellow card)

Quarter-finals
Walide Khyar (FRA)	00
Gusman Kyrgyzbayev (KAZ)	10

=== Pool D ===
First round
Kubanychbek Aibek Uulu (KGZ)	00
Bogdan Iadov (UKR)	11
Willian Lima (BRA)	01
Sardor Nurillaev (UZB)	00 (yellow card)
Edmilson Pedro (ANG)	01
Serdar Rahimov (TKM)	10

Round of 16
Yondonperenlein Baskhüü (MGL)	10 (yellow card)
Bogdan Iadov (UKR)	00
Willian Lima (BRA)	10
Serdar Rahimov (TKM)	00

Quarter-finals
Yondonperenlein Baskhüü (MGL)	00
Willian Lima (BRA)	01
