= Willian Lima =

Brazilian judoka (born 2000)

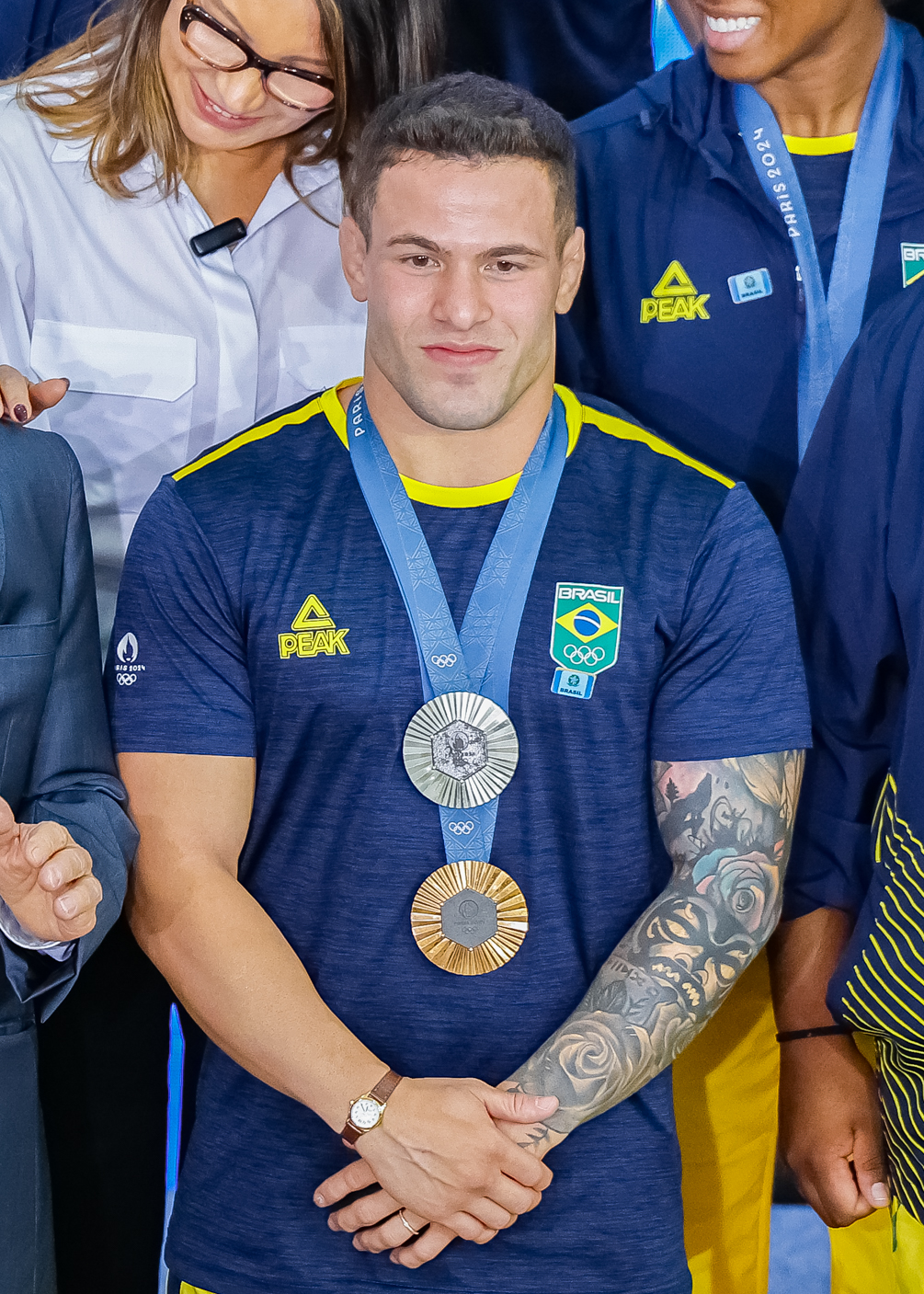
- Lima in August 2024

Personal information
- Born: 31 January 2000 (age 26) Mogi das Cruzes, São Paulo
- Occupation: Judoka
- Height: 1.65 m (5 ft 5 in)

Sport
- Country: Brazil
- Sport: Judo
- Weight class: ‍–‍66 kg

Achievements and titles
- Olympic Games: (silver) (2024)
- World Champ.: R16 (2022, 2023, 2024)
- Pan American Champ.: (2021, 2024)
Medal record
Men's judo
Representing Brazil
Olympic Games
| Silver medal – second place | 2024 Paris | ‍–‍66 kg |
| Bronze medal – third place | 2024 Paris | Mixed team |
Pan American Games
| Silver medal – second place | 2023 Santiago | Mixed team |
| Bronze medal – third place | 2023 Santiago | ‍–‍66 kg |
Pan American Championships
| Gold medal – first place | 2021 Guadalajara | ‍–‍66 kg |
| Gold medal – first place | 2022 Lima | Mixed team |
| Gold medal – first place | 2024 Rio de Janeiro | ‍–‍66 kg |
| Bronze medal – third place | 2022 Lima | ‍–‍66 kg |
| Bronze medal – third place | 2023 Calgary | ‍–‍66 kg |
IJF Grand Slam
| Silver medal – second place | 2022 Antalya | ‍–‍66 kg |
| Bronze medal – third place | 2019 Brasilia | ‍–‍66 kg |
| Bronze medal – third place | 2020 Budapest | ‍–‍66 kg |
| Bronze medal – third place | 2023 Antalya | ‍–‍66 kg |
| Bronze medal – third place | 2024 Tashkent | ‍–‍66 kg |
| Bronze medal – third place | 2024 Tbilisi | ‍–‍66 kg |
IJF Grand Prix
| Gold medal – first place | 2023 Zagreb | ‍–‍66 kg |
World Juniors Championships
| Gold medal – first place | 2019 Marrakesh | ‍–‍66 kg |
Pan American Junior Championships
| Gold medal – first place | 2019 Cali | ‍–‍66 kg |
Pan American Cadet Championships
| Gold medal – first place | 2017 Cancún | ‍–‍60 kg |
Summer Universiade
| Bronze medal – third place | 2019 Naples | ‍–‍66 kg |

Profile at external databases
- IJF: 36987
- JudoInside.com: 112217
- Updated on 28 July 2024

Willian de Sousa e Lima (born 31 January 2000) is a Brazilian judoka.

== Career ==
Judo entered Lima's life at the age of six, but it was not the São Paulo native's first option. When he was younger, he traveled to the beach every weekend with his family and had a very strong connection with the water. Therefore, he opted for swimming. However, he was neither old nor tall enough to start the sport. He started judo, at the Namie Judo Association, planning to leave the sport later, but began to stand out in the sport. In 2015, he joined the Esporte Clube Pinheiros team in São Paulo.

His first major result with the main judo team was in July 2019: bronze at the Universiade in Napoli, Italy. From this result, the judoka appeared on the podium of several competitions with the senior team.

Lima won gold at the 2019 World Judo Juniors Championships in Marrakesh, Morocco.

In 2019, he won a medal for the first time in a Grand Slam (the tournament that gives the most points in the judo ranking after the Olympic Games, the World Championships and the World Masters): in Brasilia 2019, he won a bronze.

At the 2020 Judo Grand Slam Hungary, Lima once again won a bronze medal, his second in Grand Slams.

Lima is the gold medallist of the 2021 Pan American Judo Championships in the ‍–‍66 kg category.

In April 2022, Lima reached the final of the 2022 Judo Grand Slam Antalya, and only lost by the golden score to Denis Vieru, of Moldova, who was the current leader of the world ranking. With this, Lima took the silver.

At the 2022 Pan American-Oceania Judo Championships held in Lima, Peru, he won a bronze medal in the Half-lightweight (66 kg) category. He also won a gold medal in Brazil's mixed team.

At the 2022 World Judo Championships, Lima started the competition by winning with a lightning ippon over Romeo Radu Izvoreanu, but in the second round he faced the Japanese Joshiro Maruyama, two-time world champion (2019-2021), who managed to beat the Brazilian by ippon, after losing by waza-ari.

At the 2023 Judo Grand Slam Antalya, Lima achieved the bronze medal.

At the 2023 World Judo Championships, Lima debuted with victory over Ramazan Kodzharov (BRN), cut from the competition for failing to weigh in. Qualified for the next round, he beat Nurali Emomali (TJK) by waza-ari with just over a minute to go. In the round of 16, he faced Frenchman Walide Khyar and ended up being defeated after four minutes of golden score - also by waza-ari. The Frenchman ended up winning the bronze medal in the tournament.

At the 2023 Pan American-Oceania Judo Championships held in Calgary, Canada, he won a bronze medal in the Half-lightweight (66 kg) category.

At the 2023 Pan American Games held in Santiago, Lima started by losing the first fight, but recovered and throughout the competition, he obtained bronze, dedicating his medal to his newborn son, called Dom. He also obtained a silver for participating in the mixed team modality.

At the 2024 Judo Grand Slam Tashkent, Lima won a bronze medal.

At the 2024 Judo Grand Slam Tbilisi, Lima won a bronze medal.

He became two-time champion at the 2024 Pan American-Oceania Judo Championships held in Rio de Janeiro, obtaining the gold medal.

At the 2024 World Judo Championships, Lima reached the round of 16 for the third time in a row, where he was eliminated by the Japanese Ryoma Tanaka, who ended up being the tournament champion.

At the 2024 Olympic Games in Paris, Lima won four fights, defeating Mongolia's Yondonperenlein Baskhüü, a two-time World Championship bronze medalist, in the quarterfinals, and Kazakh Gusman Kyrgyzbayev, the 2021 World Championship runner-up, in the semifinals, to reach the Olympic final, something that had not happened with Brazilian men's judo since Sydney 2000. In the final, facing Japanese Hifumi Abe, four-time world champion and Olympic champion, Lima was unable to resist and ended up with silver, equaling the feats of Tiago Camilo and Carlos Honorato.
