= 2022 World Judo Championships – Men's 66 kg =

Judo competition

Judo Men's 66 kg at the 2022 World Judo Championships
- Venue: Humo Ice Dome
- Location: Tashkent, Uzbekistan
- Date: 7 October
- Competitors: 44 from 34 nations
- Total prize money: €57,000

Medalists
gold medal	Hifumi Abe (3rd title)	Japan
silver medal	Joshiro Maruyama	Japan
bronze medal	An Ba-ul	South Korea
bronze medal	Denis Vieru	Moldova

Competition at external databases
- Links: IJF • JudoInside

The Men's 66 kg event at the 2022 World Judo Championships was held at the Humo Ice Dome arena in Tashkent, Uzbekistan on 7 October 2022.

== Results ==
=== Finals ===
Semi-finals
(Moldova) Denis Vieru	00
(Japan) Hifumi Abe	01
(Japan) Joshiro Maruyama	10
(South Korea) An Ba-ul	00

Final
(Japan) Hifumi Abe	01
(Japan) Joshiro Maruyama	00

=== Repechage ===
Repechage
(Ukraine) Bogdan Iadov	00
(Italy) Elios Manzi	10
(Georgia (country)) Vazha Margvelashvili	10
(Israel) Baruch Shmailov	00

Bronze medal
(Italy) Elios Manzi	00
(South Korea) An Ba-ul	10
(Georgia (country)) Vazha Margvelashvili	00
(Moldova) Denis Vieru	01

=== Pool A ===
First round
(Serbia) Strahinja Bunčić	10
(Israel) Tal Flicker	00
(Germany) Lennart Slamberger	10
(Peru) Juan Postigos	00
(Switzerland) Freddy Waizenegger	10
(Niger) Ismael Alhassane	00

Round of 32
(Moldova) Denis Vieru	01
(Serbia) Strahinja Bunčić	00
(Germany) Lennart Slamberger	00
(Spain) Alberto Gaitero	10
(Azerbaijan) Orkhan Safarov	01
(Switzerland) Freddy Waizenegger	00
(Uzbekistan) Sardor Nurillaev	00
(Ukraine) Bogdan Iadov	01

Round of 16
(Moldova) Denis Vieru	01
(Spain) Alberto Gaitero	00
(Azerbaijan) Orkhan Safarov	00
(Ukraine) Bogdan Iadov	10

Quarter-finals
(Moldova) Denis Vieru	01
(Ukraine) Bogdan Iadov	00

=== Pool B ===
First round
(Brazil) Eric Takabatake	00
(Finland) Luukas Saha	10
(Egypt) Mohamed Abdelmawgoud	00
(Bahrain) Ramazan Kodzhakov	10
(Italy) Elios Manzi	10
(Bulgaria) Bozhidar Temelkov	00

Round of 32
(Japan) Hifumi Abe	10
(Finland) Luukas Saha	00
(Cuba) Orlando Polanco	00
(Tajikistan) Nurali Emomali	01
(Mongolia) Yondonperenlein Baskhüü	10
(Bahrain) Ramazan Kodzhakov	01
(Italy) Elios Manzi	10
(Zambia) Steven Mungandu	00

Round of 16
(Japan) Hifumi Abe	10
(Tajikistan) Nurali Emomali	00
(Mongolia) Yondonperenlein Baskhüü	00
(Italy) Elios Manzi	01

Quarter-finals
(Japan) Hifumi Abe	10
(Italy) Elios Manzi	00

=== Pool C ===
First round
(Morocco) Abderrahmane Boushita	10
(Turkey) Muhammed Demirel	00
(Moldova) Radu Izvoreanu	10
(Bulgaria) Yanislav Gerchev	01
(Japan) Joshiro Maruyama	10
(Romania) Lucian Borş Dumitrescu	00

Round of 32
(Georgia (country)) Vazha Margvelashvili	10
(Morocco) Abderrahmane Boushita	00
(Ukraine) Karo Marandian	10
(United States) Isaiah Ramirez	00
(Brazil) Willian Lima	11
(Moldova) Radu Izvoreanu	00
(Netherlands) Ivo Verhorstert	00
(Japan) Joshiro Maruyama	10

Round of 16
(Georgia (country)) Vazha Margvelashvili	10
(Ukraine) Karo Marandian	00
(Brazil) Willian Lima	00
(Japan) Joshiro Maruyama	10

Quarter-finals
(Georgia (country)) Vazha Margvelashvili	00
(Japan) Joshiro Maruyama	10

=== Pool D ===
First round
(Italy) Matteo Piras	00
(Kazakhstan) Gusman Kyrgyzbayev	10
(Azerbaijan) Yashar Najafov	10
Miad Nosrati	00
(Mongolia) Ganboldyn Kherlen	00
(France) Walide Khyar	10

Round of 32
(South Korea) An Ba-ul	01
(Kazakhstan) Gusman Kyrgyzbayev	00
(Spain) Adrián Nieto	01
(Azerbaijan) Yashar Najafov	00
(Israel) Baruch Shmailov	10
(Costa Rica) Ian Sancho	00
(France) Walide Khyar	w/o
(Algeria) ~~Wail Ezzine~~	00

Round of 16
(South Korea) An Ba-ul	01
(Spain) Adrián Nieto	00
(Israel) Baruch Shmailov	10
(France) Walide Khyar	00

Quarter-finals
(South Korea) An Ba-ul	10
(Israel) Baruch Shmailov	00
