= Yashar Najafov =

Azerbaijani judoka (1999)

Personal information
- Native name: Yaşar Nəcəfov
- Born: 9 June 1999 (age 27)
- Occupation: Judoka

Sport
- Country: Azerbaijan
- Sport: Judo
- Weight class: ‍–‍66 kg

Achievements and titles
- Olympic Games: R32 (2024)
- World Champ.: R32 (2022, 2024)
- European Champ.: 5th (2022, 2023)
Medal record
Men's judo
Representing Azerbaijan
IJF Grand Slam
Gold medal – first place	2023 Baku	‍–‍66 kg
Silver medal – second place	2022 Tel Aviv	‍–‍66 kg
Bronze medal – third place	2023 Ulaanbaatar	‍–‍66 kg
Bronze medal – third place	2024 Baku	‍–‍66 kg
IJF Grand Prix
Gold medal – first place	2022 Zagreb	‍–‍66 kg
Silver medal – second place	2024 Odivelas	‍–‍66 kg
Bronze medal – third place	2023 Dushanbe	‍–‍66 kg
Summer Universiade
Bronze medal – third place	2021 Chengdu	‍–‍66 kg

Profile at external databases
- IJF: 20903
- JudoInside.com: 35893
- Updated on 23 December 2024

Yashar Asif oglu Najafov (Azerbaijani: Yaşar Asif oğlu Nəcəfov; born 9 June 1999) is an Azerbaijani judoka, a member of the Azerbaijan national judo team, winner of a 2023 Baku Grand Slam tournament, bronze medalist at the XXXI World University Games, and 2022 champion of Azerbaijan. Najafov represented Azerbaijan at the 2024 Summer Olympics in Paris.

== Biography ==
Yashar Najafov was born on 9 June 1999.

In February 2022, he won a silver medal at the Tel Aviv Grand Slam. In May of that year, at the 2022 European Championships in Sofia, Najafov reached the semifinals, where he lost to Bogdan Iadov of Ukraine and then faced a defeat in the bronze medal match against Elios Manzi of Italy. In July 2022, Najafov claimed victory at the Zagreb Grand Prix and won the 2022 Azerbaijan Judo Championship in December.

In June 2023, he secured a bronze medal at the Dushanbe Grand Prix and, later that month, another bronze at the Ulaanbaatar Grand Slam. In July, Najafov earned a bronze medal at the Chengdu Summer World University Games. In September 2023, he triumphed at the Baku Grand Slam. In November, at the 2023 European Championships in Montpellier, Najafov once again reached the semifinals, losing to Denis Vieru of Moldova and later to Bogdan Iadov of Ukraine in the bronze medal match. Najafov concluded 2023 ranked 9th in the world and 7th in the Olympic standings.

In January 2024, Yashar Najafov won a silver medal at the Odivelas Grand Prix in Odivelas, Portugal, and, in February, earned a bronze medal at the Baku Grand Slam. As a result, Najafov improved his position in the IJF Olympic ranking and secured an Olympic quota. At the 2024 Summer Olympics, Yashar Najafov was defeated by Strahinja Bunčić in the Round of 32.

As of March 2024, he was ranked 7th globally.
