= 2021 European Judo Championships – Men's 66 kg =

Judo Men's 66 kg at the 2021 European Judo Championships
- Venue: Altice Arena
- Location: Lisbon, Portugal
- Date: 16 April
- Competitors: 28 from 22 nations

Medalists
gold medal	Manuel Lombardo (1st title)	Italy
silver medal	Vazha Margvelashvili	Georgia
bronze medal	João Crisóstomo	Portugal
bronze medal	Alberto Gaitero	Spain

Competition at external databases
- Links: IJF • JudoInside

The men's 66 kg competition at the 2021 European Judo Championships was held on 16 April at the Altice Arena.

== Results ==
=== Final ===
Final
Vazha Margvelashvili (GEO)	00
Manuel Lombardo (ITA)	10

=== Repechage ===
Repechage
Dzmitry Minkou (BLR)	10
Vadim Bunescu (MDA)	00

Third place
Dzmitry Minkou (BLR)	00
João Crisóstomo (POR)	01

Repechage
Kenneth Van Gansbeke (BEL)	00
Alberto Gaitero (ESP)	01

Third place
Alberto Gaitero (ESP)	01
Strahinja Bunčić (SRB)	00

=== Top half ===
Round of 32
Adrián Nieto (ESP)	10
Petr Zhukov (ROU)	00
Bogdan Iadov (UKR)	10
Mattia Miceli (ITA)	00
Dzmitry Minkou (BLR)	11
André Diogo (POR)	00
Strahinja Bunčić (SRB)	10
Jeremy Saywell (MLT)	00
Orkhan Safarov (AZE)	10
Amit Bobovich (ISR)	00
Vadim Bunescu (MDA)	10
Jusuf Nurković (MNE)	00

Round of 16
Vazha Margvelashvili (GEO)	10
Adrián Nieto (ESP)	01
Bogdan Iadov (UKR)	00
Dzmitry Minkou (BLR)	01
Aram Grigoryan (RUS)	00
Strahinja Bunčić (SRB)	10
Orkhan Safarov (AZE)	00
Vadim Bunescu (MDA)	11

Quarterfinals
Vazha Margvelashvili (GEO)	10
Dzmitry Minkou (BLR)	00
Strahinja Bunčić (SRB)	10
Vadim Bunescu (MDA)	00

Semifinals
Vazha Margvelashvili (GEO)	10
Strahinja Bunčić (SRB)	00

=== Bottom half ===
Round of 32
Robert Klačar (CRO)	01
Nathon Burns (IRL)	00
Mikhail Pulyaev (RUS)	01
Kenneth Van Gansbeke (BEL)	11
Lucian Borş Dumitrescu (ROU)	01
Luukas Saha (FIN)	00
Georgios Balarjishvili (CYP)	10
Bozhidar Temelkov (BUL)	01
Nijat Shikhalizada (AZE)	10
Matej Poliak (SVK)	01
Patryk Wawrzyczek (POL)	00
João Crisóstomo (POR)	01

Round of 16
Manuel Lombardo (ITA)	11
Robert Klačar (CRO)	00
Kenneth Van Gansbeke (BEL)	01
Lucian Borş Dumitrescu (ROU)	00
Alberto Gaitero (ESP)	10
Georgios Balarjishvili (CYP)	00
Nijat Shikhalizada (AZE)	01
João Crisóstomo (POR)	11

Quarterfinals
Manuel Lombardo (ITA)	10
Kenneth Van Gansbeke (BEL)	00
Alberto Gaitero (ESP)	00
João Crisóstomo (POR)	10

Semifinals
Manuel Lombardo (ITA)	10
João Crisóstomo (POR)	00
