= Judo at the 2014 Summer Youth Olympics – Boys' 66 kg =

Judo competition

Boys' 66 kg at the II Summer Youth Olympic Games
- Venue: Longjiang Gymnasium
- Date: 17 August
- Competitors: 21 from 21 nations

Medalists
| 1st place, gold medalist(s) | | Hifumi Abe | Japan |
| 2nd place, silver medalist(s) | | Bogdan Iadov | Ukraine |
| 3rd place, bronze medalist(s) | | Sukhrob Tursunov | Uzbekistan |
| 3rd place, bronze medalist(s) | | Wu Zhiqiang | China |

The Boys' 66 kg tournament in Judo at the 2014 Summer Youth Olympics was held on August 17 at the Longjiang Gymnasium.

This event was the second lightest of the boy's judo weight classes, limiting competitors to a maximum of 66 kilograms of body mass. The tournament bracket consisted of a single-elimination contest culminating in a gold medal match. There was also a repechage to determine the winners of the two bronze medals. Each judoka who had lost before the finals competed in the repechage with the two finalists getting bronze medals.

== Results ==
=== Main Bracket ===
Round of 32
Adrian Gandia (PUR) | 010
Petar Zadro (BIH) | 000
Ryu Seung-hwan (KOR) | 110
Harutyun Dermishyan (ARM) | 010
Vandric Jon Castro (GUM) | 000
Jolan Florimont (FRA) | 100
Elios Manzi (ITA) | 000
Salim Rebahi (ALG) | 000
Julián Sancho (CRC) | 100
Peter Miles (GBR) | 000

Round of 16
Bogdan Iadov (UKR) | 001
Adrian Gandia (PUR) | 000
Sukhrob Tursunov (UZB) | 100
Stoyan Tarapanov (BUL) | 000
Dzmitry Minkou (BLR) | 000
Ryu Seung-hwan (KOR) | 100
Adonis Diaz (USA) | 100
Marton Sarecz (HUN) | 000
Hifumi Abe (JPN) | 100
Jolan Florimont (FRA) | 000
Elios Manzi (ITA) | 000
Luis González (VEN) | 010
Tsend-Ochiryn Tsogtbaatar (MGL) | 000
Wu Zhiqiang (CHN) | 000
Paweł Wawrzyczek (POL) | 000
Julián Sancho (CRC) | 010

Quarterfinals
Bogdan Iadov (UKR) | 100
Sukhrob Tursunov (UZB) | 001
Ryu Seung-hwan (KOR) | 100
Adonis Diaz (USA) | 000
Hifumi Abe (JPN) | 100
Luis González (VEN) | 000
Wu Zhiqiang (CHN) | 000
Julián Sancho (CRC) | 100

Semifinals
Bogdan Iadov (UKR) | 010
Ryu Seung-hwan (KOR) | 010
Hifumi Abe (JPN) | 100
Julián Sancho (CRC) | 000

Finals
Bogdan Iadov (UKR) | 000
Hifumi Abe (JPN) | 100

=== Repechage ===
| Repechage 1 | | Repechage 2 |
| Harutyun Dermishyan (ARM) | 100 |
| Adrian Gandia (PUR) | 001 | Harutyun Dermishyan (ARM) | 110 |
| Bye | | Stoyan Tarapanov (BUL) | 000 |
| Stoyan Tarapanov (BUL) |
| Petar Zadro (BIH) | 000 |
| Dzmitry Minkou (BLR) | 010 | Dzmitry Minkou (BLR) | 001 |
| Bye | | Marton Sarecz (HUN) | 000 |
| Marton Sarecz (HUN) |
| Bye |
| Jolan Florimont (FRA) | | Jolan Florimont (FRA) | 000 |
| Peter Miles (GBR) | 000 | Elios Manzi (ITA) | 100 |
| Elios Manzi (ITA) | 000 |
| Vandric Jon Castro (GUM) | 000 |
| Tsend-Ochiryn Tsogtbaatar (MGL) | 100 | Tsend-Ochiryn Tsogtbaatar (MGL) | 000 |
| Salim Rebahi (ALG) | 000 | Paweł Wawrzyczek (POL) | 100 |
| Paweł Wawrzyczek (POL) | 010 |

Repechage 3
Harutyun Dermishyan (ARM) | 010
Adonis Diaz (USA) | 000
Dzmitry Minkou (BLR) | 000
Sukhrob Tursunov (UZB) | 1000
Elios Manzi (ITA) | 000
Wu Zhiqiang (CHN) | 010
Paweł Wawrzyczek (POL) | 000
Luis González (VEN) | 000

Repechage 4
Harutyun Dermishyan (ARM) | 000
Sukhrob Tursunov (UZB) | 110
Wu Zhiqiang (CHN) | 001
Paweł Wawrzyczek (POL) | 000

Bronze Medal Finals
Sukhrob Tursunov (UZB) | 010
Julián Sancho (CRC) | 000
Wu Zhiqiang (CHN) | 000
Ryu Seung-hwan (KOR) | 000
