= Costa Rica at the 2014 Summer Youth Olympics =

- IOC code: CRC
- NOC: Comité Olímpico de Costa Rica

in Nanjing
- Competitors: 3 in 3 sports
- Medals: Gold 0 Silver 0 Bronze 0 Total 0

Summer Youth Olympics appearances
- 2010; 2014; 2018; 2026

Costa Rica competed at the 2014 Summer Youth Olympics, in Nanjing, China from 16 August to 28 August 2014.

== Judo ==
Costa Rica qualified one athlete based on its performance at the 2013 Cadet World Judo Championships.

Individual

Athlete	Event	Round of 32	Round of 16	Quarterfinals	Semifinals	Rep 1	Rep 2	Rep 3	Rep 4	Final / BM	Rank
Athlete	Event	Opposition Result	Opposition Result	Opposition Result	Opposition Result	Opposition Result	Opposition Result	Opposition Result	Opposition Result	Opposition Result	Rank
Julian Sancho	Boys' -66 kg	P Miles (GBR); W 100 – 000	P Wawrzyczek (POL); W 010 – 000	Wu (CHN); W 100 – 000	Abe (JPN); L 000 – 100	Bye				S Tursunov (UZB); L 000 – 010	5

Team

Athletes	Event	Round of 16	Quarterfinals	Semifinals	Final	Rank
Athletes	Event	Opposition Result	Opposition Result	Opposition Result	Opposition Result	Rank
Team Ruska; Sadjia Amrane (ALG); Jose Basile (BRA); Harutyun Dermishyan (ARM); Szabina Gercsák (HUN); Lovro Kovac (CRO); Kamila Pasternak (POL); Julian Sancho (CRC); Betina Temelkova (BUL)	Mixed Team	Bye	Team Rouge (MIX); L 2 – 5	did not advance		5

== Swimming ==
Costa Rica qualified one swimmer.

Boys

Athlete	Event	Heat		Semifinal		Final	
Athlete	Event	Time	Rank	Time	Rank	Time	Rank
Arnoldo Herrera	50 m breaststroke	30.34	33	did not advance			
Arnoldo Herrera	200 m breaststroke	2:27.46	22	—N/a		did not advance	

== Triathlon ==
Costa Rica was given a quota to compete by the tripartite committee.

Individual

Athlete	Event	Swim (750m)	Trans 1	Bike (20 km)	Trans 2	Run (5 km)	Total Time	Rank
Ana Catalina Barahona	Girls	10:23	0:53	33:23	0:53	21:24	1:06:27	26

Relay

Athlete	Event	Total Times per Athlete (Swim 250m, Bike 6.6 km, Run 1.8 km)	Total Group Time	Rank
America 4 Ana Catalina Barahona (CRC); Diego Lopez Acosta (MEX); Maria Velasquez Soto (COL); Bryan Mendoza Ramos (ESA)	Mixed Relay	24:05; 20:37; 24:39; 21:07	1:30:28	12
