= Baruch Shmailov =

Israeli judoka (born 1994)

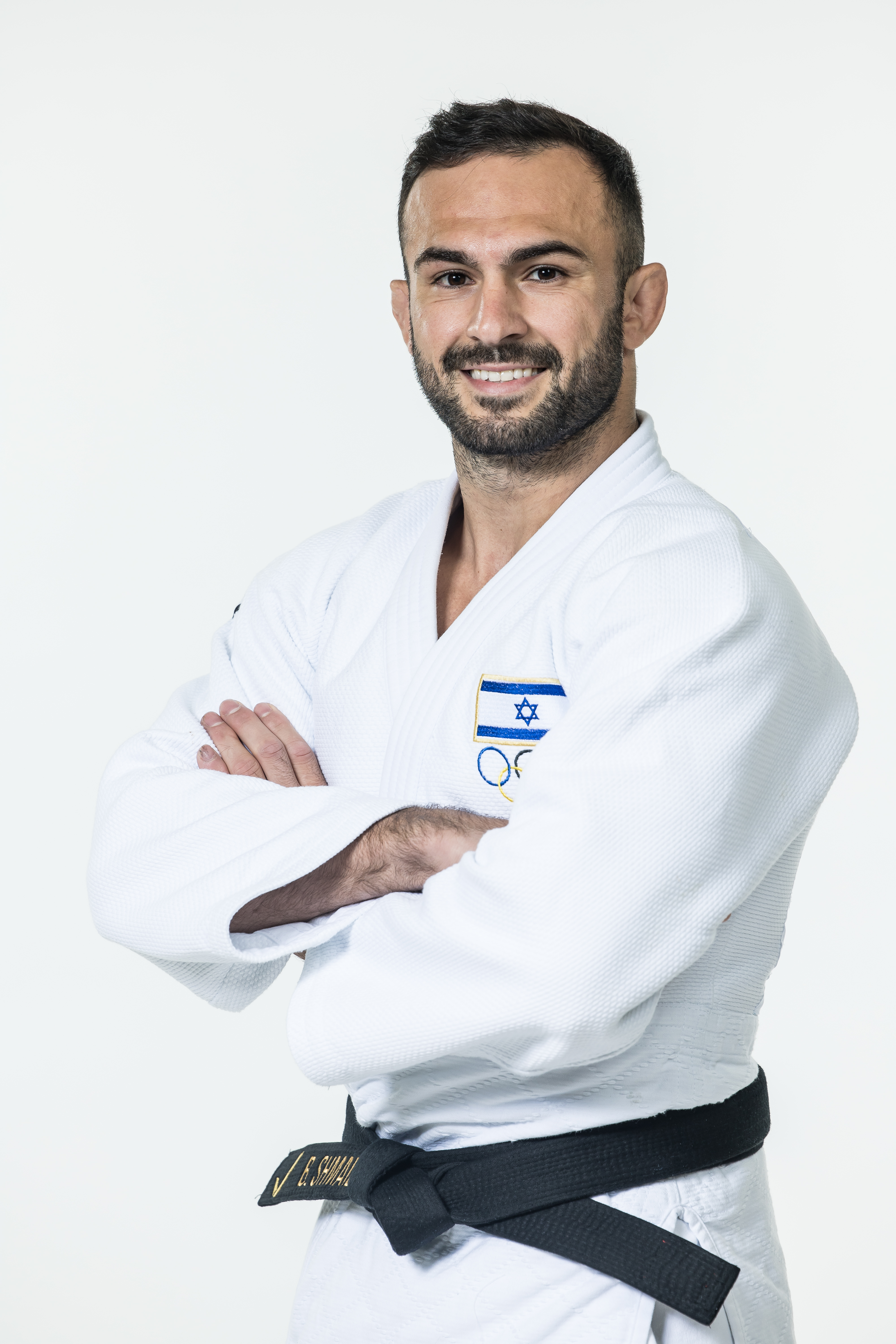
- Shmailov in 2024

Personal information
- Native name: ברוך שמאילוב
- Nationality: Israeli
- Born: 2 September 1994 (age 32) Israel
- Occupation: Judoka
- Years active: 27
- Height: 170 cm (5 ft 7 in)
- Spouse: Betina Temelkova

Sport
- Country: Israel
- Sport: Judo
- Weight class: –66 kg
- Rank: 5th dan black belt
- Club: Otzma Judokan Petah Tikva
- Coached by: Oren Smadja, Artur Kataev, Eran Vardi
- Retired: 14 January 2026

Achievements and titles
- Olympic Games: 5th (2020)
- World Champ.: 7th (2022)
- European Champ.: 5th (2017, 2022)
- Highest world ranking: 3^{rd}
Medal record
Men's judo
Representing Israel
Olympic Games
Bronze medal – third place	2020 Tokyo	Mixed team
World Masters
Gold medal – first place	2022 Jerusalem	‍–‍66 kg
Silver medal – second place	2018 Guangzhou	‍–‍66 kg
Silver medal – second place	2021 Doha	‍–‍66 kg
Bronze medal – third place	2017 Saint Petersburg	‍–‍66 kg
IJF Grand Slam
Gold medal – first place	2022 Tel Aviv	‍–‍66 kg
Silver medal – second place	2024 Tashkent	‍–‍66 kg
Bronze medal – third place	2017 Baku	‍–‍66 kg
Bronze medal – third place	2018 Düsseldorf	‍–‍66 kg
Bronze medal – third place	2018 Abu Dhabi	‍–‍66 kg
Bronze medal – third place	2019 Paris	‍–‍66 kg
Bronze medal – third place	2019 Ekaterinburg	‍–‍66 kg
IJF Grand Prix
Silver medal – second place	2015 Tbilisi	‍–‍66 kg
Silver medal – second place	2016 Zagreb	‍–‍66 kg
Silver medal – second place	2018 The Hague	‍–‍66 kg
Silver medal – second place	2024 Linz	‍–‍66 kg
Bronze medal – third place	2017 Antalya	‍–‍66 kg
Bronze medal – third place	2018 Zagreb	‍–‍66 kg
European U23 Championships
Gold medal – first place	2014 Wrocław	‍–‍66 kg
World Juniors Championships
Bronze medal – third place	2014 Fort Lauderdale	‍–‍66 kg
European Junior Championships
Gold medal – first place	2014 Bucharest	‍–‍66 kg

Profile at external databases
- IJF: 17286
- JudoInside.com: 93077
- Updated on 17 January 2026

Baruch Shmailov (Hebrew: ברוך שמאילוב; born 2 September 1994) is an Israeli retired Olympic judoka. He competes in the under 66 kg weight category, and won a gold medal in the 2022 World Masters in Jerusalem. Shmailov also won a bronze in the 2017 World Masters, as well as silver at both the 2018 World Masters and the 2021 World Masters.

Shmailov competed for Israel at the 2020 Summer Olympics, finishing in fifth place in the men's 66 kg event and winning a bronze medal in the mixed team event. He has reached a high world ranking of third in 2019, 2022, and 2024. Shmailov represented Israel at the 2024 Summer Olympics in Paris in judo in the men's 66 kg event (where he beat Morocco's Abderrahmane Boushita in his first match, lost to Tajikistan's Nurali Emomali in his round of 16 match, and came in 9th), and in the mixed team event in which Team Israel came in ninth.

== Early life ==
Shmailov grew up in Hadera, Israel, and is Jewish. He was raised by his mother Elza, a solderer in an electronics company. When he was 4 his parents divorced. At the age of 6 his mother sent him to practice jujutsu and karate, he also began to practice judo. When he was 11, during a training session in the judo club in Hadera, a former judoka and politician Yoel Razvozov came to visit. He recognized Shmailov's potential and recommended that he transfer to train at the famous Wingate Institute under better conditions, which he did the following year.

=== 2013–15; European Junior Judo Champion ===
Shmailov's coaches are Israeli former Olympic bronze medalist Oren Smadja, Artur Kataev, and Eran Vardi.

In 2013 Shmailov won the gold medal in the Israeli U21 Championships in Ra'anana in 66 kg.

On 19 September, at the age of 20, Shmailov took part in the 2014 European Junior Championships which was held in Bucharest, Romania, and won the gold medal after winning every match by ippon. A month later, he won the bronze medal in the under 66 kg category in the 2014 World Juniors Championships in Fort Lauderdale, Florida after losing the semi-final match to Japan's Hifumi Abe and defeating Ukraine's Bogdan Iadov in the bronze medal match. On 14 November, at 20 years old he won the 2014 European U23 Championships in Wrocław, Poland, after defeating Andraž Jereb of Slovenia in the final. In 2014 he again won the gold medal in the Israeli U21 Championships in Ra'anana in 66 kg.

Shmailov won his first medal in a senior competition when he won a silver medal at the 2015 Tbilisi Grand Prix on 20 March in Georgia. He defeated former world champion Georgii Zantaraia in the semi-final and lost to Mongolia's Davaadorjiin Tömörkhüleg in the final. On 7 October, he took part in Israel's national championship and won the gold medal after he defeated Tohar Butbul in the final.

=== 2016–19 ===
In September 2016, Shmailov won the silver medal in the Zagreb Grand Prix in Croatia. On 10 March 2017, he won the bronze medal at the Baku Grand Slam in Azerbaijan, after defeating Nijat Shikhalizada of Azerbaijan in the medal match. Less than a month later he won the bronze at the 2017 Antalya Grand Prix in Turkey. On 16 December, Shmailov took part in the prestigious 2017 World Masters which was held in Saint Petersburg, Russia, and won a bronze medal after he defeated Brazil's Charles Chibana in the medal match.

On 23 February, Shmailov won a bronze medal at the 2018 Düsseldorf Grand Slam in Germany after defeating Russia's Yakub Shamilov in golden score of the medal match when he managed to get a pinning hold on his opponent. Shmailov competed in the 2018 World Masters tournament in Guangzhou, China, and won the silver medal. In the quarter-finals he defeated then European champion Adrian Gomboc of Slovenia by ippon, in the semi-finals he defeated Daniel Cargnin of Brazil by ippon as well, and in the final lost to Joshiro Maruyama of Japan by ippon. Later that year he also won the silver medal in the 2018 The Hague Grand Prix in the Netherlands, and bronze medals in the 2018 Zagreb Grand Prix in Croatia and the 2018 Abu Dhabi Grand Slam in the United Arab Emirates.

In 2019 Shmailov won bronze medals in the 2019 Paris Grand Slam in France and the 2019 Ekaterinburg Grand Slam in Russia.

=== 2020 Tokyo Olympics (in 2021); bronze medal ===
After a long contest with Tal Flicker, Shmailov was chosen to represent Israel at the 2020 Summer Olympics in Tokyo in the men's 66 kg weight category. In his first match, Shmailov beat Mozambique's Kevin Loforte by ippon. At the round of 16, he beat Australian Nathan Katz by waza-ari, advancing to the quarterfinals. There, he met former European champion Vazha Margvelashvili of Georgia, losing by ippon and turning to compete at the repechage for a chance to win a bronze medal. In his next match, Shmailov beat Slovenia's former European champion Adrian Gomboc, beating him by waza-ari in golden score and advancing to fight for the bronze. Shmailov lost the bronze medal match to Brazilian two-time Pan American champion Daniel Cargnin, finishing in fifth place in the individual competition, as he won a bronze medal in the mixed team.

=== 2021–present ===
Shmailov won the silver medal in his event at the 2021 World Masters held in Doha, Qatar.

Shmailov won the gold medal in his event at the 2022 Tel Aviv Grand Slam in Israel. As of December 2022, Shmailov was ranked #3 in 66 kg weight category.

Shmailov won the gold medal in the 2022 World Masters that was held in Jerusalem, Israel in December. He underwent meniscus surgery in June 2023.

Shmailov won silver medals in the 2024 Tashkent Grand Slam in Uzbekistan and the 2024 Linz Grand Prix in Austria.

=== 2024 Paris Olympics ===
Shmailov represented Israel at the 2024 Summer Olympics in Paris in judo in the men's 66 kg event. He beat Morocco's Abderrahmane Boushita in his first match, lost to Tajikistan's Nurali Emomali by waza-ari in his round of 16 match, finishing the individual competition in the 9th place. He also competed in the mixed team event, in which Team Israel came in ninth. Shmailov gave a special thanks to team coach Oren Smadja, "who made the really difficult decision to come here" just a few weeks after his son Omer was killed while fighting with the IDF in Gaza. "He’s a symbol of resilience for the entire country. Oren is a national symbol... the fact that he’s here gives huge significance to the athletes. We knew he would come, no matter what."

== Personal life ==
Shmailov is married to Bulgarian-born judoka Betina "Beti" Temelkova, who competed for Israel beginning in 2017.

== Titles ==
Year	Tournament	Place	Ref.
2015	Grand Prix Tbilisi	2nd place, silver medalist(s)	
2016	Grand Prix Zagreb	2nd place, silver medalist(s)	
2017	Grand Slam Baku	3rd place, bronze medalist(s)	
2017	Grand Prix Antalya	3rd place, bronze medalist(s)	
2017	World Masters	3rd place, bronze medalist(s)	
2018	Grand Slam Düsseldorf	3rd place, bronze medalist(s)	
2018	Grand Prix Zagreb	3rd place, bronze medalist(s)	
2018	Grand Slam Abu Dhabi	3rd place, bronze medalist(s)	
2018	Grand Prix The Hague	2nd place, silver medalist(s)	
2018	World Masters	2nd place, silver medalist(s)	
2019	Grand Slam Paris	3rd place, bronze medalist(s)	
2019	Grand Slam Ekaterinburg	3rd place, bronze medalist(s)	
2021	World Masters	2nd place, silver medalist(s)	
2022	Grand Slam Tel Aviv	1st place, gold medalist(s)	
2022	World Masters	1st place, gold medalist(s)	
2024	Grand Slam Tashkent	2nd place, silver medalist(s)	
2024	Grand Prix Linz	2nd place, silver medalist(s)	

== See also ==
- List of select Jewish judokas
