= Judo at the 2020 Summer Olympics – Men's 66 kg =

Men's 66 kg at the Games of the XXXII Olympiad
- Venue: Nippon Budokan
- Date: 25 July 2021
- Competitors: 27 from 27 nations

Medalists
1st place, gold medalist(s)		Hifumi Abe	Japan
2nd place, silver medalist(s)		Vazha Margvelashvili	Georgia
3rd place, bronze medalist(s)		An Ba-ul	South Korea
3rd place, bronze medalist(s)		Daniel Cargnin	Brazil

The men's 66 kg competition in judo at the 2020 Summer Olympics was held on 25 July 2021 at the Nippon Budokan, in Tokyo, Japan.

== Results ==
=== Finals ===
Semi-finals
Daniel Cargnin (BRA)	00
4 Hifumi Abe (JPN)	10
2 An Ba-ul (KOR)	00
3 Vazha Margvelashvili (GEO)	01

Gold medal
4 Hifumi Abe (JPN)	01
3 Vazha Margvelashvili (GEO)	00

=== Repechage ===
Repechage
1 Manuel Lombardo (ITA)	10
5 Yondonperenlein Baskhüü (MGL)	00

Bronze medal
2 An Ba-ul (KOR)	10
1 Manuel Lombardo (ITA)	00

Repechage
Adrian Gomboc (SLO)	00
6 Baruch Shmailov (ISR)	01

Bronze medal
Daniel Cargnin (BRA)	01
6 Baruch Shmailov (ISR)	00

=== Pool A ===
Round of 32
Orkhan Safarov (AZE)	00
Yerlan Serikzhanov (KAZ)	01
8 Sardor Nurillaev (UZB)	00
Denis Vieru (MDA)	10
Daniel Cargnin (BRA)	10
Mohamed Abdelmawgoud (EGY)	00

Round of 16
1 Manuel Lombardo (ITA)	01
Yerlan Serikzhanov (KAZ)	00
Denis Vieru (MDA)	00
Daniel Cargnin (BRA)	01

Quarter-finals
1 Manuel Lombardo (ITA)	00
Daniel Cargnin (BRA)	01

=== Pool B ===
Round of 32
Kilian Le Blouch (FRA)	10
Ismael Alhassane (NIG)	00
Dzmitry Minkou (BLR)	10
Ayoub El-Idrissi (QAT)	00

Round of 16
4 Hifumi Abe (JPN)	10
Kilian Le Blouch (FRA)	00
5 Yondonperenlein Baskhüü (MGL)	10
Dzmitry Minkou (BLR)	00

Quarter-finals
4 Hifumi Abe (JPN)	01
5 Yondonperenlein Baskhüü (MGL)	00

=== Pool C ===
Round of 32
Ian Sancho Chinchila (CRC)	11
Indrit Cullhaj (ALB)	00
7 Alberto Gaitero Martin (ESP)	00
Georgii Zantaraia (UKR)	10
Adrian Gomboc (SLO)	10
Steven Mungandu (ZAM)	00

Round of 16
2 An Ba-ul (KOR)	10
Ian Sancho Chinchila (CRC)	00
Georgii Zantaraia (UKR)	00
Adrian Gomboc (SLO)	01

Quarter-finals
2 An Ba-ul (KOR)	10
Adrian Gomboc (SLO)	00

=== Pool D ===
Round of 32
Yakub Shamilov (ROC)	10
Sebastian Seidl (GER)	00
6 Baruch Shmailov (ISR)	11
Kevin Loforte (MOZ)	00
Juan Postigos (PER)	00
Nathan Katz (AUS)	10

Round of 16
3 Vazha Margvelashvili (GEO)	01
Yakub Shamilov (ROC)	00
6 Baruch Shmailov (ISR)	01
Nathan Katz (AUS)	00

Quarter-finals
3 Vazha Margvelashvili (GEO)	10
6 Baruch Shmailov (ISR)	00
