= An Ba-ul =

South Korean judoka (born 1994)

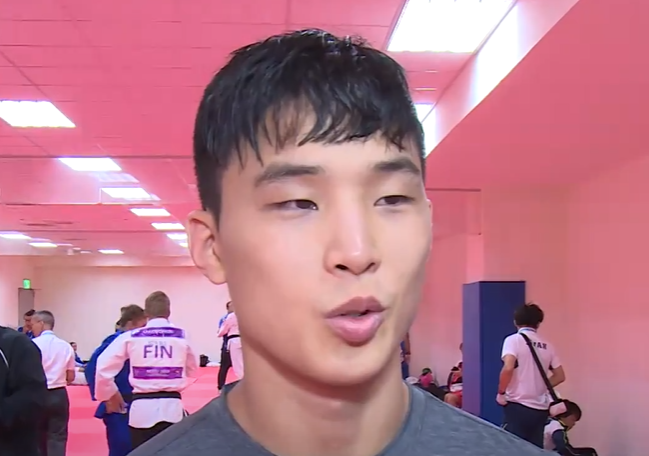
- An in 2017

Personal information
- Native name: 안바울
- Nationality: South Korean
- Born: 25 March 1994 (age 32) Anyang, South Korea
- Home town: Seoul, South Korea
- Education: Yongin University
- Occupation: Judoka
- Height: 168 cm (5 ft 6 in)
- Weight: 69 kg

Korean name
- Hangul: 안바울
- RR: An Baul
- MR: An Paul

Sport
- Country: South Korea
- Sport: Judo
- Weight class: ‍–‍66 kg
- Rank: 2nd dan black belt
- Team: Namyangju City Hall; Taeneung Korea National Team
- Coached by: Choi Min-ho; Song Dae-nam

Achievements and titles
- Olympic Games: (silver) (2016)
- World Champ.: (gold) (2015)
- Asian Champ.: (gold) (2017, 2018)
Medal record
Men's judo
Representing South Korea
Olympic Games
Silver medal – second place	2016 Rio de Janeiro	‍–‍66 kg
Bronze medal – third place	2020 Tokyo	‍–‍66 kg
Bronze medal – third place	2024 Paris	Mixed team
World Championships
Gold medal – first place	2015 Astana	‍–‍66 kg
Bronze medal – third place	2018 Baku	‍–‍66 kg
Bronze medal – third place	2022 Tashkent	‍–‍66 kg
Asian Games
Gold medal – first place	2018 Jakarta	‍–‍66 kg
Bronze medal – third place	2022 Hangzhou	‍–‍66 kg
Asian Championships
Gold medal – first place	2017 Hong Kong	‍–‍66 kg
Silver medal – second place	2015 Kuwait City	‍–‍66 kg
Silver medal – second place	2021 Bishkek	‍–‍66 kg
World Masters
Gold medal – first place	2016 Guadalajara	‍–‍66 kg
Gold medal – first place	2021 Doha	‍–‍66 kg
Bronze medal – third place	2023 Budapest	‍–‍66 kg
IJF Grand Slam
Gold medal – first place	2015 Abu Dhabi	‍–‍66 kg
Gold medal – first place	2018 Paris	‍–‍66 kg
Gold medal – first place	2020 Paris	‍–‍66 kg
Gold medal – first place	2021 Tashkent	‍–‍66 kg
Silver medal – second place	2022 Paris	‍–‍66 kg
Bronze medal – third place	2016 Paris	‍–‍66 kg
Bronze medal – third place	2017 Tokyo	‍–‍66 kg
Bronze medal – third place	2019 Abu Dhabi	‍–‍66 kg
IJF Grand Prix
Gold medal – first place	2016 Düsseldorf	‍–‍66 kg
Gold medal – first place	2020 Tel Aviv	‍–‍66 kg
Silver medal – second place	2014 Jeju	‍–‍66 kg
Silver medal – second place	2023 Almada	‍–‍66 kg
Bronze medal – third place	2015 Düsseldorf	‍–‍66 kg
Bronze medal – third place	2018 Hohhot	‍–‍66 kg
Bronze medal – third place	2022 Almada	‍–‍66 kg
World Juniors Championships
Gold medal – first place	2013 Ljubljana	‍–‍60 kg
Silver medal – second place	2011 Cape Town	‍–‍60 kg
Summer Universiade
Gold medal – first place	2015 Gwangju	‍–‍66 kg
Gold medal – first place	2017 Taipei	‍–‍66 kg

Profile at external databases
- IJF: 9713
- JudoInside.com: 58513
- Updated on 25 September 2023

An Ba-ul (a.k.a. An Baul; Korean: 안바울, Korean pronunciation: [an.ba.ul]; born 25 March 1994) is a South Korean judoka.

An is the 2015 World Champion at the half-lightweight division (‍–‍66 kg). He rose to prominence by becoming South Korea's first half-lightweight champion in more than a decade.

Before transitioning to senior level, An was a noted junior judoka, where he was also junior World Champion. He is known for his tactical style of fighting and versatile seoi nage. He is currently ranked No. 1 in the world (as of 7 September 2021).

At the 2016 Olympics, An won a silver medal in the men's 66 kg.

== Career ==
=== Beginnings: 2009–2012 ===
==== 2009 World Cadet Championships Budapest ====
An played in his first international competition at the World Cadet Championships in Budapest, competing in the under 55 kg category. He was 16 years old. An lost in his first fight against Russia's Roman Buzuk.

==== 2011 World Junior Championships Cape Town ====
An transitioned from cadet to junior level at the 2011 World Junior Championships in Cape Town. It was his first time competing in the extra-lightweight category. He won his first four fights to book a final against future senior World Champion Naohisa Takato. An lost and had to settle for the silver medal.

==== 2012 World Cup Jeju ====
An fought in his first senior tournament as a junior at the World Cup in Jeju, which featured senior and eventual national teammate Kim Won-jin. He lost in his first fight against Taiwan's Tsai Ming Yen by ippon.

=== Success in junior career: 2013–2014 ===
==== 2013 World Junior Championships Ljubljana ====
An had a major breakthrough in his junior career at the World Junior Championships in Ljubljana. An won his first four fights, and met Azerbaijan's Oruj Valizade in the semi-final. It was a shido-filled match, with An gaining 3 shidos, and Valizade gaining 4, disqualifying the latter and sending An to the final.

An was against Uzbekistan's Diyorbek Urozboev in the final. It was another shido-filled fight, with each gaining 3. An sealed his win with a seoi nage for a waza-ari, becoming junior world champion.

==== 2014 World Junior Championships Fort Lauderdale ====
An participated in his third junior world championships in Fort Lauderdale, where he moved up a weight class to the half-lightweight category. He was anticipated to becoming the tournament winner as the defending champion, and looked to be on form, defeating Colombia's Andres Chapparo in his first fight by ippon with kata-gatame.

An then faced rising star and eventual tournament finalist Hifumi Abe in his second fight. An gained a shido with just a minute left, therefore sealing Abe's win and ending An's vie for a medal. An competed with Korea in the teams competition, where he won bronze. This would be his last junior tournament. He was quoted saying, "I was in good condition and fought better than I did in the individual event. ...I am excited and nervous about moving up to fight in the senior circuit."

=== Transition to senior level and first continental medal: 2014–2015 ===
"I am excited and nervous about moving up to fight in the senior circuit." – An Ba-ul after winning the Teams title with Korea

==== 2014 Grand Prix Jeju ====
An had a smooth start in his first official senior tournament at the Grand Prix in Jeju, where he defeated Mongolia's Batsuuri Adiya for ippon with an unorthodox osaekomi-waza. In his second fight against Spain's Sugoi Uriarte, he won by yuko with a seoi nage to kosoto gake combination.

An met Russia's Anzaur Ardanov in the quarter-final, and scored first with a waza-ari using a kosoto gari to seoi nage combination. He scored again, this time a yuko, with a seoi nage to kouchi gari combination. Referees originally scored it waza-ari, effectively ending the fight, before it was retracted to a yuko. An finally sealed the fight with an awasete ippon by scoring waza-ari with a seoi nage.

An then went against Britain's Colin Oates in the semi-final. He scored a yuko with one of his favourite ashi waza, kouchi gari. He then scored a waza-ari with a drop seoi nage, winning the fight and sending him to the final.

In the final, An faced Japan's Sho Tateyama in a scoreless fight. Tateyama won the bout when An was awarded a shido, making the Korean settle for silver.

==== 2014 Grand Slam Tokyo ====
An gained more experience in the IJF circuit in his first Grand Slam in Tokyo. He faced high-level opponents, including two world champions and a double world runners-up. An was set against Georgia's Beka Shavdatuashvili in Round 2. He scored an ippon with a drop sode tsurikomi goshi in less than fifty seconds, making the fight his shortest win.

An then faced Russia's Alim Gadanov in a tight fight, winning narrowly by yuko with uchi mata. In the quarter-final, An met reigning World Champion Masashi Ebinuma. Ebinuma threw An for waza-ari with yoko guruma, and then pinned him with tate shiho gatame for awasete ippon, ending An's chances of gold. An was set in the repechage against another world champion and multiple medalist Georgii Zantaraia. An scored a waza-ari with a drop seoi nage, and then again scored a waza-ari with the same signature technique for ippon, sending him through to the bronze medal contest.

In the bronze medal contest, he faced another tough opponent in two-time world silver medalist Mikhail Pulyaev. Pulyaev threw An for waza-ari with a drop tai otoshi, making An settle for fifth place.

==== 2015 Grand Prix Dusseldorf ====
An narrowly won his first three fights at his second Grand Prix, beating his opponent in Round 1 by yuko, Round 2 by waza-ari and Round 3 by shido. In Round 2, An had a notable win against Israel's Golan Pollack, where he used uchi mata to throw Pollack for waza-ari.

An then had a difficult match up against Japan's Kengo Takaichi, where he was thrown for waza-ari in the opening minute with yoko guruma, and then was nearly pinned with tate shiho gatame, similar to Ebinuma's score against him in Tokyo. The waza-ari was later elevated to ippon by referees, sending An to a repechage against Slovenia's Adrian Gomboc. He won with a waza-ari using Korea's signature drop seoi nage with just three seconds on the clock.

In the bronze medal contest, An went against France's David Larose, and narrowly won by yuko, again with a drop seoi nage, winning An's second circuit medal.

==== 2015 European Open Warsaw ====
An won his first senior tournament at the European Open in Warsaw, where he won two fights by ippon, and three fights by shido. He defeated Kazakhstan's Yeldos Zhumakanov in the final in golden score by shido.

==== 2015 Asian Championships ====
An participated in his first continental tournament at the Asian Championships in Kuwait City, and came in ranked number 33. He faced Tajikistan's Umed Abdurakhimov in his first fight, and scored a yuko in the opening seconds with a drop seoi nage. A few attacks after, An transitioned to newaza and pinned Abdurakhimov with kata gatame, and then shifted to yoko shiho gatame for ippon, sealing his win.

In the quarter-final, An faced a difficult opponent in Ma Duanbin in a shido-filled fight. The bout had a fair share of newaza, however remained scoreless until An's drop sode-tsurikomi-goshi that landed Ma on his side, earning the former a yuko. There were no scores after that, sending An to the semi-final. An then went against then-world number two Davaadorjiin Tömörkhüleg. It was a tight match, with no scores and two shidos each at the end of five minutes. A minute and a half into golden score, An scored ippon with a drop morote seoi nage to book a place in the final.

An was set to fight against Japan's Tomofumi Takajo, who was ranked thirteen places above him. There was an array of seoi nage attacks from both An and Takajo, and the latter was the one to score with yuko, leaving An to settle for silver, his first continental medal.

=== Breakthrough: Winning the 2015 Universiade, World Championships and Grand Slam Abu Dhabi ===
==== 2015 Universiade ====
An represented Yongin University under Korea at the Universiade at home ground in Gwangju. He was coached by head coach Song Dae-nam for the tournament instead of the national extra and half-lightweight coach Choi Min-ho. He faced Taipei's Chien Chia-Hung in his first fight, and scored a waza-ari, however won by ippon, as Chien was awarded a fourth shido for hansoku make. He then fought against Japan's Sho Tateyama in the next round, and neither could score. An was through to the quarter-final as he had one shido less. An managed to throw Hungary's Zsolt Gorjanacz for waza-ari, and it was enough to send him to the semi-final. In the semi-final, An faced Kyrgyzstan's Bektur Ryzmambetov, and scored two waza-aris for awasete ippon closing into the final.

An faced France's Alexandre Mariac in the gold medal contest, and scored a yuko in just 15 seconds with one of his signature skills drop sode-tsurikomi-goshi. With a minute and half left, An threw Mariac for ippon with another signature skill single lapel morote seoi nage to win the gold medal.

==== 2015 World Championships ====
"I am so happy, I really can't believe it. I have to thank my coach and all of the team who have helped me to achieve this. I can't describe how I feel."

— An Ba-ul, after winning the World title

After winning his first national title at the 2015 KJA National Championships, An was chosen to compete for Korea in his first senior World Championships in Astana. He came in ranked number 20.

An fought against Cuba's Carlos Thondique in Round 1, and scored waza-ari with a drop sode-tsurikomi-goshi. He again scored waza-ari with a drop single sleeve morote seoi nage for awasete ippon with 30 seconds to spare. In the second round, An competed against Belarus' Dzmitry Shershan. It was a close fight, with much of the action based on newaza. However, neither of them were able to pin or use successful submission techniques. An managed to score a yuko with a drop seoi nage effort to send him through to the next round. He attempted to use shime waza on Shershan in the dying seconds for ippon, but ran out of time.

In Round 3, An battled an experienced opponent in Kamal Khan-Magomedov. Khan-Magomedov was penalised thrice by the fourth minute, and had a glimmer of a score when he moved play to newaza and attempted an okuri eri jime before it was stopped by the referee as An escaped. An's dominance with the seoi nage shown again as he scored a waza-ari with the skill, and was enough to send him to the quarter-final. The stellar performance against the more established Russian earned him two thumbs up from coach Choi.

An was set against Uzbekistan's Rishod Sobirov in the quarter-final and again used reverse seoi nage to score a waza-ari. It was a close shido-filled fight, but An pulled through to enter the semi-final. An faced past opponent Pollack, and it was an even closer fight with no scores. An had initially scored a yuko with an ippon seoi nage, but was retracted by the referees. Despite earning a shido with one second left, it was still two less than Pollack, making him Korea's first finalist of the tournament. It was his fourth time winning against Pollack.

In the final, An faced Pulyaev, also a past opponent. It was the final with the most shidos, and the only one to end with a disqualification. An and Pulyaev were both level with 3 shidos each by the end of five minutes, and it went on to a minute of golden score until Pulyaev was penalised for being passive. An became one of the two world champions for Korea at the championships, the other being middleweight Gwak Dong-han. An said after claiming the World title, "I am so happy, I really can't believe it. I have to thank my coach and all of the team who have helped me to achieve this. I can't describe how I feel."

An also represented Korea in the team competition as the under 66 kg fighter. Korea battled against France in the third round, and An won against Larose, contributing to Korea's 5–0 win. In the quarter-final against Russia, An defeated Galstyan and Korea won 4–1, only losing in the half-middleweight bout. Korea was up against Georgia in the semi-final, and An beat long time rival Tomorkhuleg to set the tone for Korea. Korea won 4–1 again, with world champion Gwak supposedly losing on purpose to save energy for the final.

Korea had a much anticipated all-Asian final against defending champions Japan. The final featured reigning and former world champions across five weight divisions, namely An and Gwak for Korea, and Ebinuma, Riki Nakaya, Takanori Nagase and Ryunosuke Haga for Japan. An versus Ebinuma in the opening fight, and surprisingly lost by shido, alarming the Koreans. An Chang-rim managed to get the Koreans back by defeating Nakaya with a drop seoi nage effort, initially scoring waza-ari, then re-scored to ippon. Korea eventually lost 3–2, earning An Ba-ul a silver, and his second medal of the tournament.

==== 2015 Grand Slam Abu Dhabi ====
An cemented his position as World Champion at his Grand Slam debut in Abu Dhabi. He fought Brazil's Gabriel Pinheiro in his first bout and the Brazilian was able to hold him off for more than half the fight. However, An brought the fight to the ground and secured a pin using kata gatame to koshi jime, earning a submission for ippon. In his second fight he went against Kazakhstan's Zhansay Smagulov. Smagulov attempted a drop seoi nage but got countered by An for waza-ari. An then used his signature drop morote seoi nage to score another waza-ari for awasete ippon.

An then faced rival Khan-Magomedov in the quarter-final and again defeated the Russian, this time with seoi otoshi. An's next fight was more difficult, against Germany's Sebastian Seidl. An's attacks were unable to penetrate Seidl's defense, therefore the match remained scoreless. With one shido less An was through to the final against rival and Olympic champion Galystan. The final was another close fight with both fighters unable to gain any scores. An was less defensive with two shidos less and won his first Grand Slam to complete a hat trick.

=== Competing as World Champion and successful qualification for the Olympics: 2015–present ===
"I'm obviously one of the best-ranked judokas in the world... people are expecting a lot of me. I wouldn't say that I'm not feeling the pressure." – An Ba-ul, on his top Olympic seeding

==== 2015 Grand Slam Tokyo ====
An competed in his second Grand Slam in Tokyo and again faced Galystan in his first fight. He defeated the Russian by ippon this time, using a drop seoi nage for waza-ari, and then a tate-shiho-gatame for another waza-ari in the final minute. He surprisingly struggled in his second fight against another of his former opponents, local Tateyama. It was a close fight with only a shido between them. An lost, ending his tournament and continuing his medal-less streak in Tokyo.

==== 2016 Grand Slam Paris ====
An's first tournament of the year was at his first Paris Grand Slam. He contested against Kazhakstan's Gabit Yessimbetov in the Round of 16, with both of them earning shidos for refusing to take a grip in the opening minute. An then attempted a sumi otoshi that was scored as ippon, however was retracted by referees. An then scored a waza-ari with four seconds to spare with ippon seoi nage to send him through to the next round.

An then faced Portugal's Sergiu Oleinic, and again was unable to score ippon. An scored a yuko with a seoi nage effort, and then pinning with yoko-shiho-gatame in the closing minute to score a second yuko, winning the bout. His next fight would end his vie for gold, against long-time rival Ebinuma. He lost to Ebinuma for the third time, the second time by ippon, as Ebinuma threw him with uchi mata. An fought for a place in the bronze medal match against Italy's Fabio Basile in the repechage. It was a close fight, with only a shido separating them, handing the win to An. An regained form in the final, defeating Slovenia's Andraz Jereb by ippon with a rare uchi-mata-sukashi, earning him a bronze medal. This was one of Korea's seven medals in Paris.

==== 2016 Grand Prix Dusseldorf ====
An entered his second Düsseldorf Grand Prix, traveling to the tournament with a top class Korean team. He faced Uriarte in the first round, and again couldn't attack successfully as the bout remained scoreless. An narrowly won by a shido, but soon regained form as he blazed through his following fights. He went against Israel's Baruch Shmailov, and took the lead with a yuko using his signature skill seoi nage. He ended the bout with an ippon using kouchi gari, sending him to the quarter-final.

An again faced former opponent, local Seidl in the semi-final. Although unable to score ippon, An still dominated the fight, scoring a yuko with a single sleeve grip seoi nage. He brought the bout to newaza, pinning Seidl in yoko-shiho-gatame for yuko before the latter trapped his leg. An eventually freed his leg before pinning again with yoko-shiho gatame for waza-ari prior to Seidl's escape. These scores for An were enough to send him to the final.

In the final, An faced rival Pollack in the fight for gold. An scored waza-ari with his signature drop seoi nage in the first 30 seconds and was enough to win the tournament. It was once again a good result for the Korea team, as An's gold was one of the five medals won by his national team. An ranked number one in the world with his win, one of the four Koreans to do so.

==== 2016 KJA National Championships ====
An won his second national title and successfully qualified for the 2016 Olympics as Korea's half-lightweight representative. He successfully qualified as the number one ranked half-lightweight fighter in both the world and Olympic qualification rankings, and as the national tournament winner. He defeated his opponent in the final with sankaku jime for ippon. Tipped to be the one to beat for gold at Rio, An has said, "I'm obviously one of the best-ranked judokas in the world... people are expecting a lot of me. I wouldn't say that I'm not feeling the pressure, but I do feel very proud to be part of the national team."

==== 2016 World Masters Guadalajara ====
At An's first invitation to the World Masters in Guadalajara, he was seeded number one. He faced Algeria's Houd Zourdani in his first fight, and won by ippon as Zourdani was disqualified for earning four shidos for passivity. He again fought Pollack in the quarter-final, but showed his superiority when he landed the latter on his back for ippon with his strong seoi nage in less than 20 seconds.

An battled another rival in Oleinic in the semi-final, and this time could not throw for ippon. He threw Oleinic with a drop morote seoi nage for yuko, and the no other throws were scored, sending him to the final. In the final he met rising star Tomorkhuleg for an anticipated match up, with the absence of Ebinuma. However, Tomorkhuleg had withdrawn due to injury, effectively giving the win to An via fusen gachi.

=== Continued podium streak and shock defeat at the 2016 Olympics ===
I was on cloud nine... but I couldn't compose myself. I headed into the gold medal match in that state of mind. I failed to get a hold of myself and I think that's why I lost.

— An on his emotions winning against long time rival Ebinuma, and then losing in the final to Italy's Basile

"There's the sense of pressure that comes with competing in the games. But after strenuous training... I could win over anyone and everyone." – An on coming in as top seed and his preparations for the Olympics

"I'm sure I can win gold at the Olympics in four years' time. I'll be training very hard to do just that. " An on his resolution and looking towards Tokyo 2020

An came into the Olympic Games ranked first and was largely expected to take the gold in Rio. He was hailed by Korean media as one of the two predicted golds from judo at the Rio. In Round 2 he faced Kazakhstan's Zhansay Smagulov. He won by waza-ari through seoi nage, and sealed the win awasete ippon with a juji-gatame. He continued his ippon streak in the third round with another waza-ari with seoi nage, and then landed his opponent from France, Kilian LeBlouch, with sode-tsurikomi-goshi flat on his back.

An faced a challenge in Rishod Sobirov in the quarter-final. Both of them were penalised with shido for defensive posture in the beginning of the bout, and An sealed his place in the semi-finals with a seoi nage for waza-ari. His fight against long-time rival Masashi Ebinuma of Japan was reminiscent of the Japanese bout at the 2012 Olympics against An's countryman and coaching staff Cho Jun-ho.

After being deadlocked with a shido each in regular time, the bout went into golden score. It was vital for both An and Ebinuma to win as neither Japan nor Korea has had a gold medal after two days of competition. An attacked first with a reverse seoi nage on a single sleeve grip but failed to score. Ebinuma would then attempt a drop double sleeve seoi nage, again to no score. Ebinuma again attacked with a drop ippon seoi nage, only to get countered by An with tani otoshi for yuko, effectively ending the bout with a win to An. An then celebrated with Ebinuma clinging to him, becoming a parody among the Korean judo community.

An faced lesser known Fabio Basile in the final. Basile had been playing ippon judo throughout the tournament, but was considered a surprise finalist. However, An and Basile had contested in the past, notably at the 2016 Paris Grand Slam. In just over a minute, Basile had scored ippon against An with the latter's signature skill, seoi nage. This would result in Korea's second medal in judo after Jeong Bo-kyeong's silver in the extra-lightweights. There would then be numerous media coverage about Basile causing one of the biggest upsets in Olympic judo as An was the world champion, world number one and heavy favourite to win the title.

==== 2016 Grand Slam Tokyo ====
An returned to competition at the Grand Slam in Tokyo. Basile was also competing at the IJF's top circuit tournament continuing their budding rivalry. After winning by awasete ippon with two seoi nages, An lost in the quarter-final against Japan's Yuuki Hashiguchi when he was disqualified for hansoku make because of a waki gatame, in which An attempted a dangerous ippon seoi nage with an incorrect grip. Despite qualifying for the repechage, An did not compete therefore handing his opponent the win with fusen gachi. The rematch with Basile did not occur as neither fighters made the finals.

== Fighting style ==
An is known for his tactical and methodical style of judo, that has evolved since his junior career. An is right-handed but has a left-sided grip. He is also noted for his seoi nage, being trained by technician and World and Olympic champion Choi Min-ho. His most often used variation is the drop morote seoi nage. An has been praised for his versatility on nage to ashi waza combinations, as well as efficient newaza. Some of his most commonly used combinations include seoi nage to kosoto gake and kosoto gari to seoi nage.

== Palmares ==
2018
(gold) Grand Slam, Paris

== Competitive record ==
Judo Record
Total	45
Wins	37 (82.22%)
by Ippon	13 (33.33%)
Losses	8 (17.78%)
by Ippon	3 (6.67%)

(as of 30 May 2016)
