= Joshiro Maruyama =

Japanese judoka (born 1993)

Personal information
- Native name: 丸山 城志郎
- Born: 11 August 1993 (age 32) Miyazaki, Miyazaki Prefecture, Japan
- Occupation: Judoka
- Height: 167 cm (5 ft 6 in)

Sport
- Country: Japan
- Sport: Judo
- Weight class: ‍–‍66 kg
- Rank: 4th dan black belt
- Club: Tenri University; Miki House
- Retired: 17 February 2025

Achievements and titles
- World Champ.: (2019, 2021)
- Asian Champ.: (silver) (2018)
Medal record
Men's judo
Representing Japan
World Championships
| Gold medal – first place | 2019 Tokyo | ‍–‍66 kg |
| Gold medal – first place | 2021 Budapest | ‍–‍66 kg |
| Silver medal – second place | 2022 Tashkent | ‍–‍66 kg |
| Silver medal – second place | 2023 Doha | ‍–‍66 kg |
Asian Games
| Silver medal – second place | 2018 Jakarta | ‍–‍66 kg |
World Masters
| Gold medal – first place | 2018 Guangzhou | ‍–‍66 kg |
IJF Grand Slam
| Gold medal – first place | 2018 Osaka | ‍–‍66 kg |
| Gold medal – first place | 2019 Düsseldorf | ‍–‍66 kg |
| Gold medal – first place | 2022 Tokyo | ‍–‍66 kg |
| Silver medal – second place | 2017 Tokyo | ‍–‍66 kg |
| Silver medal – second place | 2018 Paris | ‍–‍66 kg |
| Silver medal – second place | 2019 Osaka | ‍–‍66 kg |
| Silver medal – second place | 2024 Paris | ‍–‍66 kg |
IJF Grand Prix
| Gold medal – first place | 2016 Almaty | ‍–‍66 kg |
| Gold medal – first place | 2018 Hohhot | ‍–‍66 kg |

Profile at external databases
- IJF: 15144
- JudoInside.com: 58502
- Updated on 2 February 2024

Joshiro Maruyama (丸山 城志郎, Maruyama Jōshirō; born 11 August 1993) is a Japanese retired judoka. He is famous for his signature uchi-mata technique.

Maruyama won a gold medal at the 2019 World Judo Championships & 2021 World Judo Championships.

Maruyama had a fierce rivalry with fellow Japanese -66 kg competitor, Hifumi Abe. The two fought in a highly anticipated and specially organized match to decide which player would be Japan's representative in the weight category for the Tokyo 2020 Olympics. The match ran almost twenty minutes into golden score, at which point Abe defeated Maruyama with an ouchi-gari, scoring waza-ari and ending the match.
