= Steven Mungandu =

Zambian judoka (born 1995)

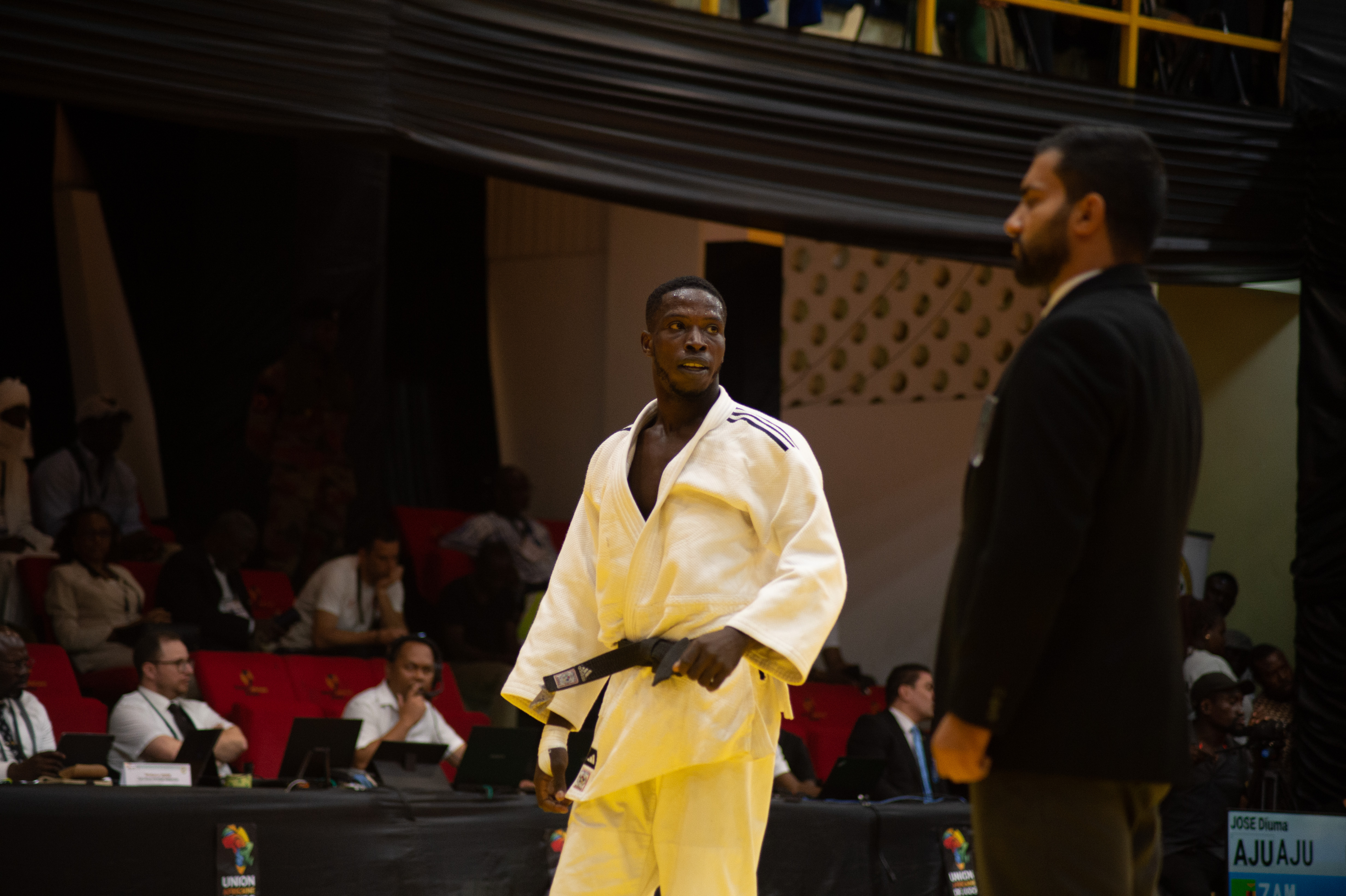
- 2023 African Games

Personal information
- Nationality: Zambia
- Born: 6 May 1995 (age 31) Lusaka, Zambia
- Occupation: Judoka

Sport
- Country: Zambia
- Sport: Judo
- Weight class: ‍–‍66 kg

Achievements and titles
- Olympic Games: R32 (2020)
- World Champ.: R32 (2019, 2022)
- African Champ.: (bronze) (2020, 2022)
Medal record
Men's judo
Representing Zambia
African Games
Gold medal – first place	2023 Accra	‍–‍66 kg
African Championships
Bronze medal – third place	2020 Antananarivo	‍–‍66 kg
Bronze medal – third place	2022 Oran	‍–‍66 kg

Profile at external databases
- IJF: 12375
- JudoInside.com: 7050
- Updated on 17 March 2024

Steven Mungandu (born 6 May 1995) is a Zambian judoka. He competed in the 2020 Summer Olympics.
