= Alberto Gaitero =

Spanish judoka (born 1996)

Personal information
- Full name: Alberto Gaitero Martin
- Born: 3 July 1996 (age 29) Valladolid, Spain
- Occupation: Judoka
- Height: 172 cm (5 ft 8 in)
- Weight: 66 kg (146 lb)

Sport
- Country: Spain
- Sport: Judo
- Weight class: ‍–‍66 kg

Achievements and titles
- Olympic Games: R32 (2020)
- World Champ.: R16 (2022, 2023)
- European Champ.: (silver) (2022)
Medal record
Men's judo
Representing Spain
European Championships
Silver medal – second place	2022 Sofia	‍–‍66 kg
Bronze medal – third place	2021 Lisbon	‍–‍66 kg
IJF Grand Slam
Gold medal – first place	2021 Tel Aviv	‍–‍66 kg
Gold medal – first place	2024 Baku	‍–‍66 kg
Silver medal – second place	2021 Antalya	‍–‍66 kg
Bronze medal – third place	2020 Düsseldorf	‍–‍66 kg
Bronze medal – third place	2023 Tel Aviv	‍–‍66 kg
Bronze medal – third place	2023 Astana	‍–‍66 kg
IJF Grand Prix
Gold medal – first place	2019 Zagreb	‍–‍66 kg
Gold medal – first place	2019 Perth	‍–‍66 kg
Silver medal – second place	2017 Cancún	‍–‍66 kg
Bronze medal – third place	2017 The Hague	‍–‍66 kg
Bronze medal – third place	2019 Tel Aviv	‍–‍66 kg
Bronze medal – third place	2019 Antalya	‍–‍66 kg
Bronze medal – third place	2023 Linz	‍–‍66 kg
European U23 Championships
Gold medal – first place	2018 Győr	‍–‍66 kg
World Juniors Championships
Silver medal – second place	2015 Abu Dhabi	‍–‍66 kg
European Junior Championships
Bronze medal – third place	2016 Málaga	‍–‍66 kg
Mediterranean Games
Silver medal – second place	2018 Tarragona	‍–‍66 kg

Profile at external databases
- IJF: 13329
- JudoInside.com: 75582
- Updated on 16 February 2024

Alberto Gaitero Martín (Note: In this Spanish name, the first or paternal surname is Gaitero and the second or maternal family name is Martín.) (born 3 July 1996) is a Spanish judoka. He is a silver medalist at the Mediterranean Games and a two-time medalist at the European Judo Championships.

== Career ==
Gaitero won the silver medal in the men's 66 kg event at the 2018 Mediterranean Games held in Tarragona, Spain. He competed at the World Judo Championships in 2017, 2018, 2019 and 2021.

In 2021, Gaitero competed in the men's 66 kg event at the Judo World Masters held in Doha, Qatar. A few months later, he won the silver medal in his event at the 2021 Judo Grand Slam Antalya held in Antalya, Turkey. He also won one of the bronze medals in the men's 66 kg event at the 2021 European Judo Championships held in Lisbon, Portugal.

Gaitero competed in the men's 66 kg event at the 2020 Summer Olympics in Tokyo, Japan where he was eliminated in his first match by Georgii Zantaraia of Ukraine.

== Achievements ==
Year	Tournament	Place	Weight class
2018	Mediterranean Games	2nd	−66 kg
2021	European Championships	3rd	−66 kg
2022	European Championships	2nd	−66 kg
