= Hifumi Abe =

Japanese judoka (born 1997)

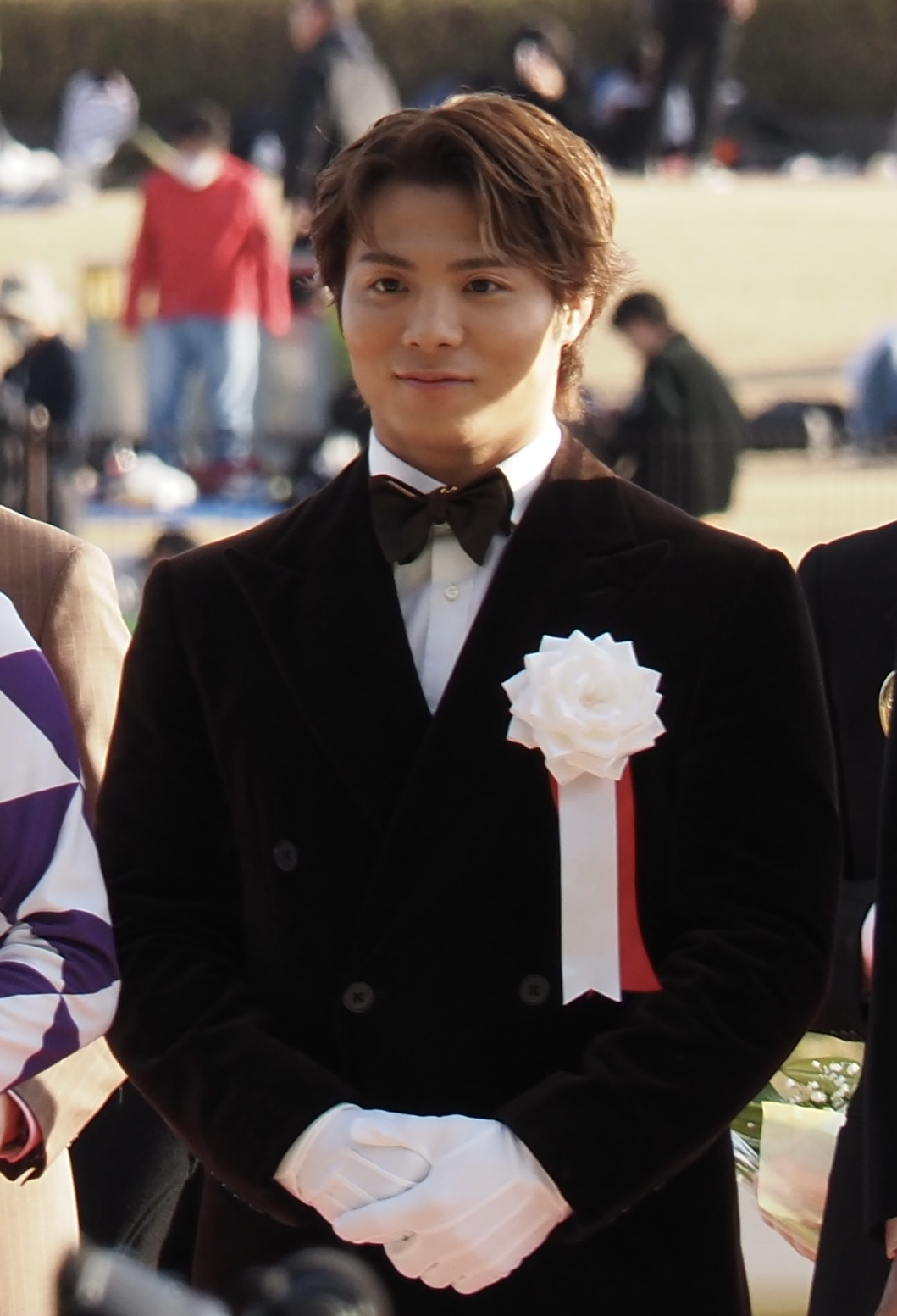
- Abe at the Tōkyō Yūshun Award Ceremony in February 2024

Personal information
- Native name: 阿部 一二三
- Nicknames: The Flamethrower, ひふみん (hifumin)
- Born: 9 August 1997 (age 29) Kobe, Hyōgo Prefecture, Japan
- Occupation: Judoka
- Height: 168 cm (5 ft 6 in)

Sport
- Country: Japan
- Sport: Judo
- Weight class: ‍–‍66 kg
- Rank: 5th dan black belt
- Club: Park24 (2020–)
- Team: All-Japan National Team
- Coached by: Keiji Suzuki; Sinchon Atsushi

Achievements and titles
- Olympic Games: (gold) (2020, 2024)
- World Champ.: (gold) (2017, 2018, 2022, 2023, 2026)
Medal record
Men's judo
Representing Japan
Olympic Games
Gold medal – first place	2020 Tokyo	‍–‍66 kg
Gold medal – first place	2024 Paris	‍–‍66 kg
Silver medal – second place	2020 Tokyo	Mixed team
Silver medal – second place	2024 Paris	Mixed team
World Championships
Gold medal – first place	2017 Budapest	‍–‍66 kg
Gold medal – first place	2018 Baku	‍–‍66 kg
Gold medal – first place	2022 Tashkent	‍–‍66 kg
Gold medal – first place	2023 Doha	‍–‍66 kg
Gold medal – first place	2026 Baku	‍–‍66 kg
Bronze medal – third place	2019 Tokyo	‍–‍66 kg
Bronze medal – third place	2025 Budapest	‍–‍66 kg
IJF Grand Slam
Gold medal – first place	2014 Tokyo	‍–‍66 kg
Gold medal – first place	2016 Tyumen	‍–‍66 kg
Gold medal – first place	2016 Tokyo	‍–‍66 kg
Gold medal – first place	2017 Paris	‍–‍66 kg
Gold medal – first place	2017 Tokyo	‍–‍66 kg
Gold medal – first place	2018 Ekaterinburg	‍–‍66 kg
Gold medal – first place	2019 Osaka	‍–‍66 kg
Gold medal – first place	2020 Düsseldorf	‍–‍66 kg
Gold medal – first place	2021 Antalya	‍–‍66 kg
Gold medal – first place	2022 Budapest	‍–‍66 kg
Gold medal – first place	2023 Tokyo	‍–‍66 kg
Gold medal – first place	2024 Antalya	‍–‍66 kg
Gold medal – first place	2025 Tokyo	‍–‍66 kg
Gold medal – first place	2026 Tashkent	‍–‍66 kg
Silver medal – second place	2018 Osaka	‍–‍66 kg
IJF Grand Prix
Gold medal – first place	2015 Tashkent	‍–‍66 kg
Gold medal – first place	2026 Qingdao	‍–‍66 kg
Silver medal – second place	2015 Ulaanbaatar	‍–‍66 kg
Bronze medal – third place	2018 Zagreb	‍–‍66 kg
World Juniors Championships
Silver medal – second place	2014 Fort Lauderdale	‍–‍66 kg
World Cadets Championships
Silver medal – second place	2013 Miami	‍–‍66 kg
Asian Cadet Championships
Gold medal – first place	2012 Taipei	‍–‍60 kg
Youth Olympic Games
Gold medal – first place	2014 Nanjing	‍–‍66 kg

Profile at external databases
- IJF: 13208
- JudoInside.com: 85604
- Updated on 5 October 2026

Hifumi Abe (阿部 一二三, Abe Hifumi; born 9 August 1997) is a Japanese judoka who competes in the Men's half-lightweight (66 kg) division. He won two consecutive gold medals in the Men's 66 kg competition at the 2020 and 2024 Summer Olympics, as well as two silver medals in a row with the Japanese team in those games' judo mixed team events. He is also a five-time world champion, having won the gold medal in his weight category at the World Judo Championships in 2017, 2018, 2022, 2023, and 2026.

Abe rose to prominence after becoming Youth Olympic champion in August 2014; an achievement followed by a silver medal in October at the World Juniors Championships in Fort Lauderdale. He subsequently won his first IJF senior competition, the Tokyo Grand Slam, in December 2014, at just 17 years old, unexpectedly beating the reigning world champion of his weight category and favorite, Masashi Ebinuma, in the semi-final.

== Early life ==
Abe began training judo in 2003, at the age of 6, in his hometown of Kōbe in Hyōgo prefecture. He began competing in elementary school. His father, Koji, is a firefighter at the Kobe City Fire Department. He was often thrown by Nami Nabekura when they were in elementary school. He said, "such an experience made me what I am". His name in kanji reads, "one, two, three".

Abe won his first national tournament while attending Kobe Ikuta junior high school, winning in the under 55 kg category. He then embarked on his junior career while attending Shinko Gakuen Shinko high school. While still a high school student, he had won the national Inter-High School championships multiple times. He graduated in 2016. Abe is presently training at the Nittaidai. He has been coached by Atsushi Nobukawa since elementary school.

His younger sister, Uta Abe, is also a highly accomplished judoka who competes in the Women's 52 kg division. An Olympic gold medalist (2020) and six-time world champion in her weight category, she is the youngest IJF senior competition winner in history, having won her first senior gold medal, aged just 16, at the 2017 Judo Grand Prix Düsseldorf.

== Career ==
=== Junior career: 2012–2014 ===
==== Cadet and high school competitions ====
Abe had won several competitions as a cadet including the Asian U17 Championships in 2012, and the European Cup Cadets in 2012.

The 2013 World Cadet Championships in Miami was Abe's first high-level international tournament. He reached the final, meeting Georgia's Koba Mchedishvili, who threw Abe for waza-ari, forcing Abe to settle for silver. The tournament was held on Abe's 16th birthday.

Abe defeated the son of Japanese legend Toshihiko Koga, Hayato, at the 2015 Inter-High School Championships.

==== 2014 All-Japan Junior Championships ====
The junior national tournament was held in Saitama. Abe defeated Takamasa Sueki in the final.

==== 2014 Youth Olympic Games ====
Abe transitioned from cadet to junior level, competing in the ‍–‍66 kg event at the 2014 Youth Olympics in Nanjing. He played ippon judo throughout the tournament, and defeated Ukraine's Bogdav Iadov by waza-ari using sode tsurikomi goshi, and then seoi nage for ippon, securing a gold medal for Japan. Both throws that were showcased in the final are his favourite techniques.

==== 2014 World Junior Championships ====
Abe was a favourite coming into the 2014 World Juniors Championships in Fort Lauderdale. He was one of the few youth Olympic champions in the tournament.

En route to the final, he defeated all his opponents by ippon in two and a half minutes or less, with the exception of future World Champion An Ba-ul in Round 2. They were separated by a single shido.

In the final, Abe was against Russia's Egor Mgdsyan. Abe was ahead in the first two and a half minutes, scoring a waza-ari and a yuko. However, Mgdsyan managed to gain two waza-aris in just 45 seconds, effectively securing ippon and defeating Abe, leaving the latter to settle for silver.

=== Senior career ===
==== Rise to prominence and transition to senior level: 2014 Kodokan Cup and Grand Slam ====
"I'm not dwelling in the victory, but I'm glad to have beaten Ebinuma. It depends on where your fate is leading you too." – Abe on winning the Tokyo Grand Slam

Abe rose to national prominence at the Kodokan Cup, his first senior tournament, where he became the youngest winner at 16-years-old, and the first high school student to win the Cup in ten years since Satoshi Ishii in 2004. His win was a surprise, especially in the third round when he defeated Masaaki Fukuoka in less than two minutes by ippon, with an uki otoshi. He defeated Yuki Nishiyama in the final.

Abe transitioned to senior level internationally at the 2014 Tokyo Grand Slam, one of the most prestigious and high-level tournaments of the IJF circuit. It was his first time being officially coached by a national team coach, namely legendary heavyweight Keiji Suzuki.

Abe dominated his opening fight against Peru's Alonso Wong, scoring a waza-ari and pinning with a kesa-gatame for ippon. He also won his second fight by ippon.

Following his second fight, Abe found himself facing tough opponents, amongst who were two world champions. He competed against five-time World Championships medalist and 2009 World Champion Georgii Zantaraia in the quarter-final, and surprisingly managed to score a waza-ari. Abe tried to pin Zantaraia, however the latter escaped. Abe was nevertheless through to a semi-final match up against triple and reigning World Champion, fellow Japanese Masashi Ebinuma.

Ebinuma scored a yuko in 30 seconds, and looked to be winning the bout. However, Abe almost threw Ebinuma for a score twice, but was unable to due to the senior's solid defense. Abe then caused an upset by scoring waza-ari in the last minute with ushiro goshi, defeating Ebinuma and reaching the final.

In the final, Abe faced Israel's Golan Pollack. Abe scored a yuko with an ouchi gari, and Pollack landed on his side outside the mat, hitting his head on the barrier. Abe then attempted to pin him, and Pollack was unable to escape, possibly ending the bout with a win to Abe, but was voided by the referee as the second skill was out of play. There were no scores after that, therefore crowning Abe as the winner of the tournament.

==== 2015 Grand Prix Düsseldorf ====
Abe competed in his first tournament of the year at the 2015 Düsseldorf Grand Prix. He struggled in his first fight, scraping through by yuko. In the second round, Abe defeated the Netherlands' Junior Degen by ippon using his favourite ashi waza, ouchi gari.

Abe then faced 2014 Asian Games champion Davaadorjiin Tömörkhüleg in the third round, and was defeated by waza-ari, ending his tournament.

==== 2015 Grand Prix Ulaanbaatar ====
Abe then returned to the tour at the 2015 Ulaanbaatar Grand Prix. Abe's first fight was against Georgia's Vazha Margvelashvili. Abe won by two waza-aris, the first of which using kosoto gari and the second using his main skill sode tsurikomi goshi. He then faced Mongolia's Batgerel Battsetseg, and won by ippon and yuko.

Abe faced budding rival Tomorkhuleg in the final, and scored first for a waza-ari, however was defeated by ippon in the final minute when Tomorkhuleg threw him using kosoto gari.

==== 2015 All-Japan Championships ====
The All-Japan Championships in Fukuoka was Abe's first senior national championships. It was his final year competing nationally as a high school student.

Abe defeated Yuuki Hashiguchi by shido in his first fight, then subsequently lost to Kengo Takaichi in just a minute and half when Takaichi pinned him using ushiro-kesa-gatame for ippon, leaving him to settle for a bronze medal.

==== 2015 Kodokan Cup ====
Abe competed in his second Kodokan Cup and entered as the defending champion. However, Abe looked off-form, not scoring a single point until the bronze medal match, where he used osoto gari and kosoto gari for an awasete ippon. His bid to defend his title failed in the third round when eventual finalist Joshiro Maruyama scored a yuko with tomoe nage. According to Abe, he felt that with this tournament loss, he would be unable to qualify for the 2016 Olympics.

==== Continued successes and first national title: Grand Prix Tashkent and 2016 All-Japan Championships ====
Abe played all-ippon judo for the first time in a senior tournament at the 2015 Tashkent Grand Prix. In his first fight, he defeated Turkey's Sinan Sandal by ippon, again using his main ashi waza, ouchi gari. He then defeated local Dostonjon Holikulov using a powerful double sleeve grip osoto gari for ippon.

In the quarter-final, Abe faced France's Alexandre Mariac, and scored a yuko using sode-tsurikomi-goshi. He sealed his win using tai otoshi for waza-ari, and connecting to pin Mariac with kesa-gatame for ippon.

Abe then had another versatility showcase in the semi-final against Mongolia's Dovdony Altansükh. Abe scored a yuko in just 17 seconds, and then scored a waza-ari with tai otoshi. He then attempted to pin Dovdony, but was unsuccessful. Abe scored another yuko with his signature skill drop seoi nage, and again attempted to pin, but his leg was latched on by Dovdony. He scored ippon with a second drop seoi nage and sealed his win.

Abe defeated China's Ma Duanbin with another powerful double sleeve grip osoto gari to end the fight in just 36 seconds by ippon, becoming tournament champion.

In his first tournament of 2016, and the first as a university student, Abe competed at his second All-Japan Championships. He looked to be on form and reached the semi-final, where he met budding rival Ebinuma. It was a critical match as the national championships also serves as a potential qualifier for the Olympics in Rio de Janeiro, and both were potential contenders as Japan's half-lightweight representative.

Abe was the first to attempt a skill, and managed to throw Ebinuma with sode-tsurikomi-goshi, but was unable to gain a score. Abe again attempted a skill, and this time was successful with osoto gari. He then connected to kesa gatame to pin Ebinuma, but the senior was able to escape before an ippon could be achieved, but scoring a waza-ari. Abe then threw Ebinuma again with sode-tsurikomi-goshi, initially scoring another waza-ari for ippon, but was voided by the referees. Abe again attempted a back throw, and was successful for a waza-ari, sending him through to the final and causing an upset.

With Ebinuma watching from the sidelines, Abe faced Maruyama in the final. The fight was very close, and both were level with a shido each, sending the match to golden score. After nearly two minutes, a second shido was awarded to Maruyama, earning Abe his first national title.

==== Injury and failure to qualify for the 2016 Olympics ====
"It was frustrating to lose [the chance to qualify], but I did not cry because there was a bronze medal match. There was pressure not to be defeated."

— Abe, on not being able to qualify for Rio 2016

Abe planned to compete at the 2016 Asian Championships, but was sidelined with a knee ligament injury. It was reported he needed at least three weeks of recovery time.

Abe is currently ranked 25th in the second last IJF World Rankings before the Olympics, and only the top 22 would be able to qualify. He is also the fourth Japanese in the rankings. With head coach Inoue recalling Ebinuma for his second Olympics as Japan's half-lightweight representative, Abe officially did not qualify.

Abe has been chosen as an ambassador for the 2020 Tokyo Olympics.

==== Return to IJF circuit and continued undefeated record in Grand Slams: 2016 Tyumen and Tokyo ====
Abe entered the 2016 Tyumen Grand Slam as the number one seed, and was considered favorite for gold. He was coached by Yusuke Kanamaru and Keiji Suzuki from the sidelines.

The competition was vacated by majority of top 30 fighters, being only 20 days before the Olympics. With the small number of fighters, Abe fought in the quarter-final against Azerbaijan's Iskandar Talishinski. He opened his first bout on fire, throwing Talishinski with his signature ouchi gari for waza-ari. He then scored another waza-ari for awasete ippon with a powerful seoi otoshi.

Abe faced teammate Sho Tateyama in an All-Japan semi-final. He threw Tateyama for waza-ari with deashi barai and earned several shidos, but continued on to the final with the former unable to score any throws. He met local Anzaur Ardanov in the final, and threw him for waza-ari with a solid osoto gari. Abe earned his first Grand Slam title since 2014.

Abe entered the 2016 Tokyo Grand Slam following senior and rival Ebinuma's absence as the top ranked half-lightweight from Japan. An Ba-ul and Fabio Basile, who were largely considered the favourites as finalists at the 2016 Olympics, also competed. Abe faced Japanese-based Korean Kim Lim-hwan in his first fight and scored a waza-ari with an ippon seoi nage. He then tried to connect with osaekomi waza but was unsuccessful. Abe finally sealed the fight with ippon with a phenomenal single sleeve grip sode-tsurikomi-goshi.

In his second fight, Abe was against Russia's Mikhail Pulyaev. Abe played with one of his most used ashi waza ouchi gari for a waza-ari. No throws were scored after that, sending Abe to the semi-final against countryman Norihito Isoda. It was a fierce fight for grips, with Abe being penalised twice with shido. He attempted a seoi nage which was initially scored an ippon but then relegated to a waza-ari. However, it was enough to send him to the final.

He faced another countryman in Yuuki Hashiguchi. It was another aggressive grip fight, but Abe had the upper hand with another seoi nage attempt, scoring a yuko. Abe followed with an osoto gari but Hashiguchi was able to escape the attack. Abe then won his second Grand Slam in Tokyo with a stunning tai otoshi for ippon. Abe was considered as a major contender at the World Championships following his win, as well as one of judo's top half-lightweights.

==== Tokyo Olympics ====
In 2021, Abe won the gold medal at the 2020 Olympics on the same day that his younger sister Uta won the gold medal in her judo division.

==== Return to IJF World Tour and The 2022 Tashkent World Championships ====
Abe Hifumi returned to the IJF World Tour on 8 July 2022 winning the Budapest Grand Slam. After the Grand Slam, he competed in the World Judo Championships in Tashkent on 7 October. He won five fights, including semi-final against the world number one Denis Vieru and the final against his country-man and fierce rival Joshiro Maruyama, after Abe countered Maruyama's ouchi-gari attempt and sent him to the ground for a waza-ari.

==== The 2025 Budapest World Championships ====
As the reigning Olympic champion, following his gold medal in the 2024 Paris Olympic Games, Abe entered the 2025 Budapest World Championships as the favourite in the Mens -66 kg category. However, in the Quarter Final Abe lost to Obid Dzhebov of Tajikistan. Despite this, Abe Hifumi recovered in the third place contest to beat Cuba's Orlando Polanco for Bronze.

== Fighting style ==
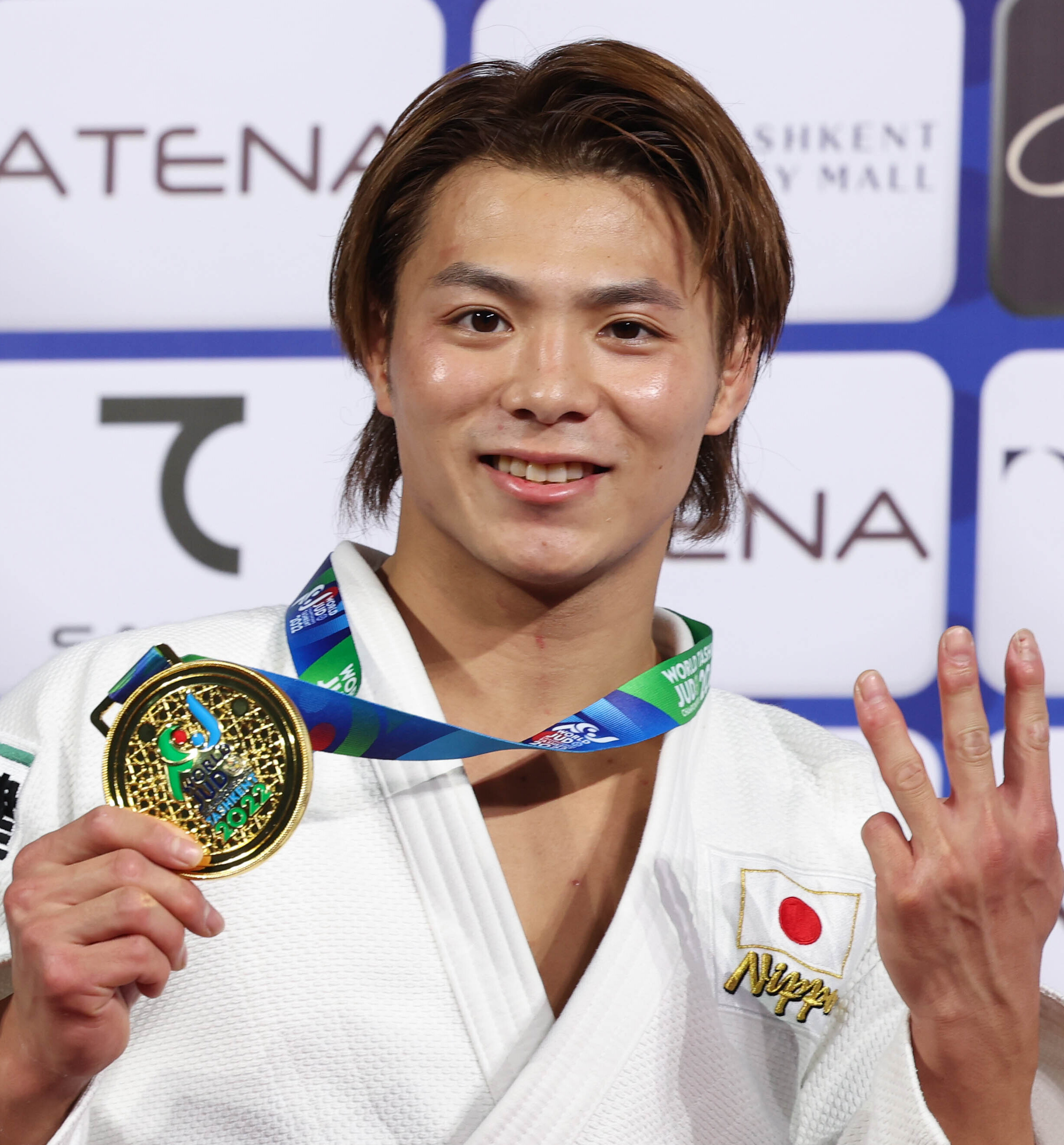
Abe at the Tashkent World Senior Championships in 2022

Abe is known for a more modern style of Japanese judo, like fellow lightweight and World Champion Naohisa Takato. He is right-handed. A seoi nage and sode-tsurikomi-goshi specialist, he is aggressive, physical and dynamic with his fighting, often preferring a fast pace of judo, with an average winning time of two and half minutes. He prefers a double sleeve grip when executing throws. Abe often connects skills using ashi waza like osoto gari and ouchi gari to set up his nage waza, and also uses osoto gari and ouchi gari as a lone skill for ippon.

Japanese legend and current head coach Kōsei Inoue has described him as, "way beyond his years... I'm looking forward to how much he can compete nationally and internationally."

Abe considers Tadahiro Nomura as his favourite fighter and main influence in his judo.

== Competitive record ==
As of 11 February 2017

Judo Record
Total	28
Wins	25 (89.3%)
by Ippon	18 (64.3%)
Losses	3 (10.7%)
by Ippon	2 (7.14%)

(does not include Youth Olympic Games and national tournaments)

== Medals ==
2014
(gold) All-Japan Junior Championships
(gold) Youth Olympic Games
(silver) World Junior Championships
(bronze) Kodokan Cup
(gold) Grand Slam Tokyo
2015
(silver) Grand Prix Ulaanbaatar
(bronze) All-Japan Championships
(bronze) Kodokan Cup
(gold) Grand Prix Tashkent
2016
(gold) All-Japan Championships
(gold) Grand Slam Tyumen
(gold) Grand Slam Tokyo
2017
(gold) Grand Slam Paris
(gold) World Championships, Budapest
(gold) Grand Prix Tokyo
2018
(gold) Grand Slam Ekaterinburg
(bronze) Grand Prix Zagreb
(gold) World Championships, Baku
(silver) Grand Slam Osaka
2019
(bronze) World Championships, Tokyo
(gold) Grand Slam Osaka
2020
(gold) Grand Slam Düsseldorf
2021
(gold) Grand Slam Antalya
(gold) Olympic Games, Tokyo
2022
(gold) Grand Slam Budapest
(gold) World Championships, Tashkent
2023
(gold) World Championships, Doha
(gold) Grand Slam Tokyo
2024
(gold) Grand Slam Antalya
(gold) Olympic Games, Paris
2025
(bronze) World Championships, Budapest
(gold) Grand Slam Tokyo
2026
(gold) Grand Slam Tashkent

== See also ==
- List of Youth Olympic Games gold medalists who won Olympic gold medals
