= Yondonperenlein Baskhüü =

Mongolian judoka (born 1993)

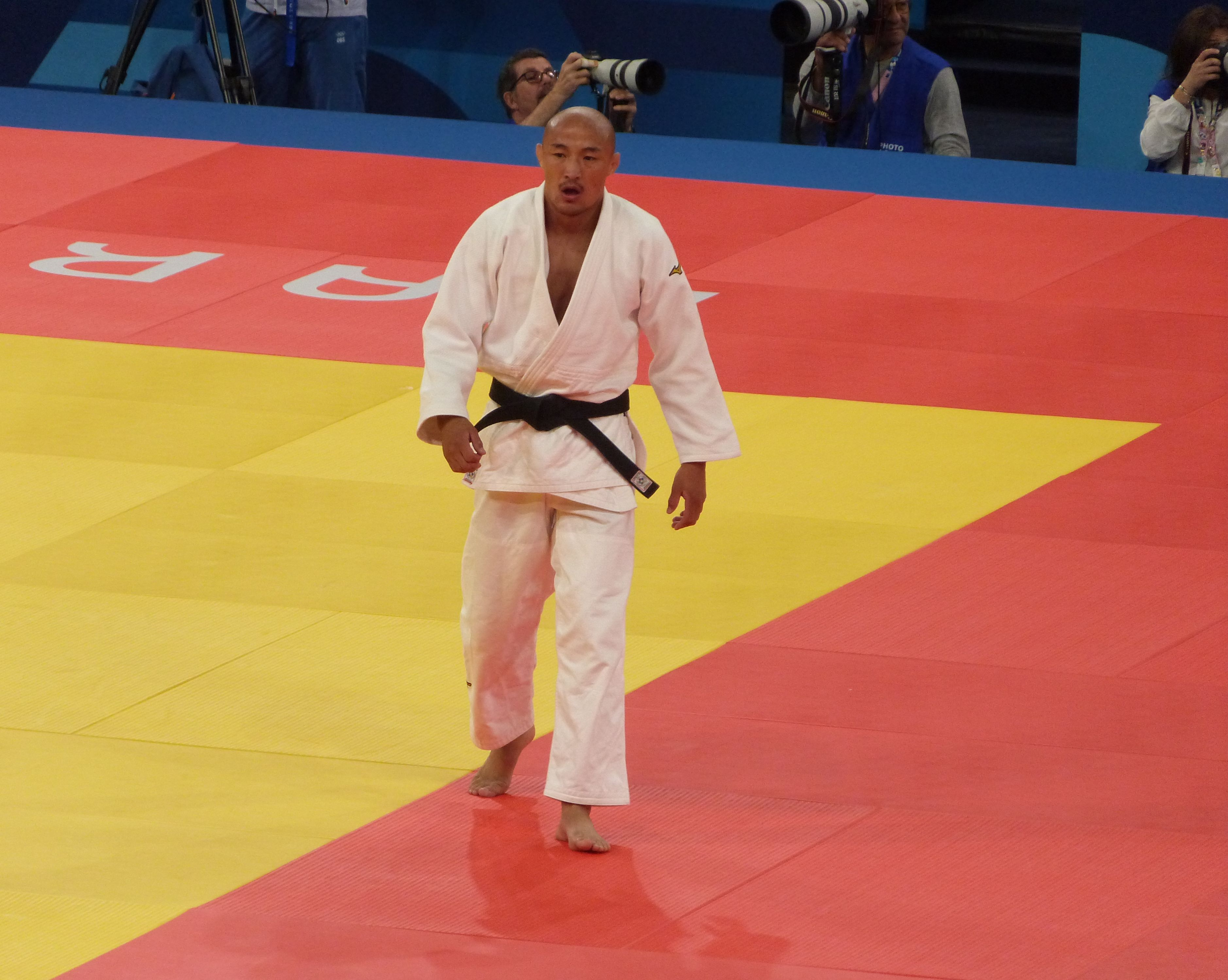

Personal information
- Nationality: Mongolia
- Born: Ёндонпэрэнлэйн Басхүү; 1 October 1993 (age 32) Zavkhan, Numrug
- Occupation: Judoka
- Height: 175 cm (5 ft 9 in)
- Website: Instagram Profile

Sport
- Country: Mongolia
- Sport: Judo
- Weight class: ‍–‍66 kg

Achievements and titles
- Olympic Games: 7th (2020, 2024)
- World Champ.: (bronze) (2021, 2023)
- Asian Champ.: (gold) (2022)
Medal record
Men's judo
Representing Mongolia
World Championships
Bronze medal – third place	2021 Budapest	‍–‍66 kg
Bronze medal – third place	2023 Doha	‍–‍66 kg
Asian Games
Silver medal – second place	2023 Hangzhou	‍–‍66 kg
Bronze medal – third place	2023 Hangzhou	Mixed team
Asian Championships
Gold medal – first place	2022 Nur‑Sultan	‍–‍66 kg
Bronze medal – third place	2019 Fujairah	‍–‍66 kg
World Masters
Bronze medal – third place	2019 Qingdao	‍–‍66 kg
IJF Grand Slam
Gold medal – first place	2022 Paris	‍–‍66 kg
Gold medal – first place	2023 Ulaanbaatar	‍–‍66 kg
Silver medal – second place	2021 Tashkent	‍–‍66 kg
Silver medal – second place	2023 Tbilisi	‍–‍66 kg
Silver medal – second place	2023 Tokyo	‍–‍66 kg
Bronze medal – third place	2018 Osaka	‍–‍66 kg
Bronze medal – third place	2019 Düsseldorf	‍–‍66 kg
Bronze medal – third place	2019 Baku	‍–‍66 kg
Bronze medal – third place	2020 Paris	‍–‍66 kg
Bronze medal – third place	2021 Abu Dhabi	‍–‍66 kg
Bronze medal – third place	2022 Ulaanbaatar	‍–‍66 kg
Bronze medal – third place	2022 Tokyo	‍–‍66 kg
IJF Grand Prix
Gold medal – first place	2017 The Hague	‍–‍66 kg
Gold medal – first place	2025 Qingdao	‍–‍66 kg
Bronze medal – third place	2017 Hohhot	‍–‍66 kg
Bronze medal – third place	2019 Hohhot	‍–‍66 kg

Profile at external databases
- IJF: 16709
- JudoInside.com: 17903
- Updated on 27 September 2025

Yondonperenlein Baskhüü (Mongolian: Ёндонпэрэнлэйн Басхүү; born 1 October 1993) is a Mongolian judoka.

Yondonperenlein won a bronze medal at the 2021 World Judo Championships. He competed in the men's 66 kg event at the 2020 Summer Olympics in Tokyo, Japan.

At the 2021 Judo Grand Slam Abu Dhabi held in Abu Dhabi, United Arab Emirates, he won one of the bronze medals in his event. He won the gold medal in his event at the 2022 Judo Grand Slam Paris held in Paris, France.
