= Elios Manzi =

Italian judoka (born 1996)

Personal information
- Born: 28 March 1996 (age 30) Messina, Italy
- Occupation: Judoka

Sport
- Country: Italy
- Sport: Judo
- Weight class: ‍–‍60 kg

Achievements and titles
- Olympic Games: R32 (2016)
- World Champ.: 5th (2022)
- European Champ.: (bronze) (2016, 2022, 2024)
Medal record
Men's judo
Representing Italy
European Championships
Bronze medal – third place	2016 Kazan	‍–‍60 kg
Bronze medal – third place	2022 Sofia	‍–‍66 kg
Bronze medal – third place	2024 Zagreb	‍–‍66 kg
IJF Grand Slam
Gold medal – first place	2022 Abu Dhabi	‍–‍66 kg
Bronze medal – third place	2025 Abu Dhabi	‍–‍66 kg
IJF Grand Prix
Gold medal – first place	2016 Almaty	‍–‍60 kg
Silver medal – second place	2025 Zagreb	‍–‍66 kg
Bronze medal – third place	2018 Cancún	‍–‍66 kg
World Cadets Championships
Silver medal – second place	2011 Kyiv	‍–‍50 kg
Silver medal – second place	2013 Miami	‍–‍55 kg
European Cadet Championships
Gold medal – first place	2011 Cottonera	‍–‍50 kg
Gold medal – first place	2013 Tallinn	‍–‍55 kg

Profile at external databases
- IJF: 7921
- JudoInside.com: 74781
- Updated on 28 November 2025

Elios Manzi (born 28 March 1996) is an Italian judoka. He competed at the 2016 Summer Olympics in the men's 60 kg event, in which he was eliminated in the second round by Kim Won-jin.
