= Strahinja Bunčić =

Serbian judoka (born 1996)

Personal information
- Nationality: Serbian
- Born: 5 January 1996 (age 30) Banja Luka, Republika Srpska, Bosnia and Herzegovina
- Occupation: Judoka
- Height: 182 cm (6 ft 0 in)

Sport
- Country: Serbia
- Sport: Judo
- Weight class: ‍–‍66 kg
- Rank: 1st dan black belt
- Club: JK Red Star Belgrade

Achievements and titles
- Olympic Games: 5th (2024)
- World Champ.: R32 (2018, 2019, 2022, 2025)
- European Champ.: 5th (2020, 2021)
Medal record
Men's judo
Representing Serbia
European Championships
| Bronze medal – third place | 2024 Zagreb | Mixed team |
IJF Grand Slam
| Silver medal – second place | 2022 Abu Dhabi | ‍–‍66 kg |
European U23 Championships
| Bronze medal – third place | 2017 Podgorica | ‍–‍66 kg |
European Cadet Championships
| Gold medal – first place | 2012 Bar | ‍–‍66 kg |
| Bronze medal – third place | 2013 Tallinn | ‍–‍66 kg |
Mediterranean Games
| Bronze medal – third place | 2022 Oran | ‍–‍66 kg |

Profile at external databases
- IJF: 7710
- JudoInside.com: 76393
- Updated on 28 July 2024

Strahinja Bunčić (Serbian Cyrillic: Страхиња Бунчић; born 5 January 1996) is a Serbian judoka. He won European U23 Championships bronze in Podgorica 2017. He took bronze in the Champions League in 2019 with Red Star Belgrade.

As part of mixed team, he won bronze medal at the 2024 European Championship. He also competed at the Paris 2024 Olympic Games in the 66kg category, where he lost in the bronze medal match.

== Achievements ==
| Year | Tournament | Place | Weight class |
|---|---|---|---|
| 2021 | European Championships | 5th | −66 kg |
| 2020 | European Championships | 5th | −66 kg |
| 2017 | European U-23 Championships | 3rd | −66 kg |
| 2016 | European Junior Championships | 5th | −66 kg |
| 2013 | European Cadet Championships | 3rd | −66 kg |
| 2012 | European Cadet Championships | 1st | −66 kg |
