= Bogdan Iadov =

Ukrainian judoka (born 1996)

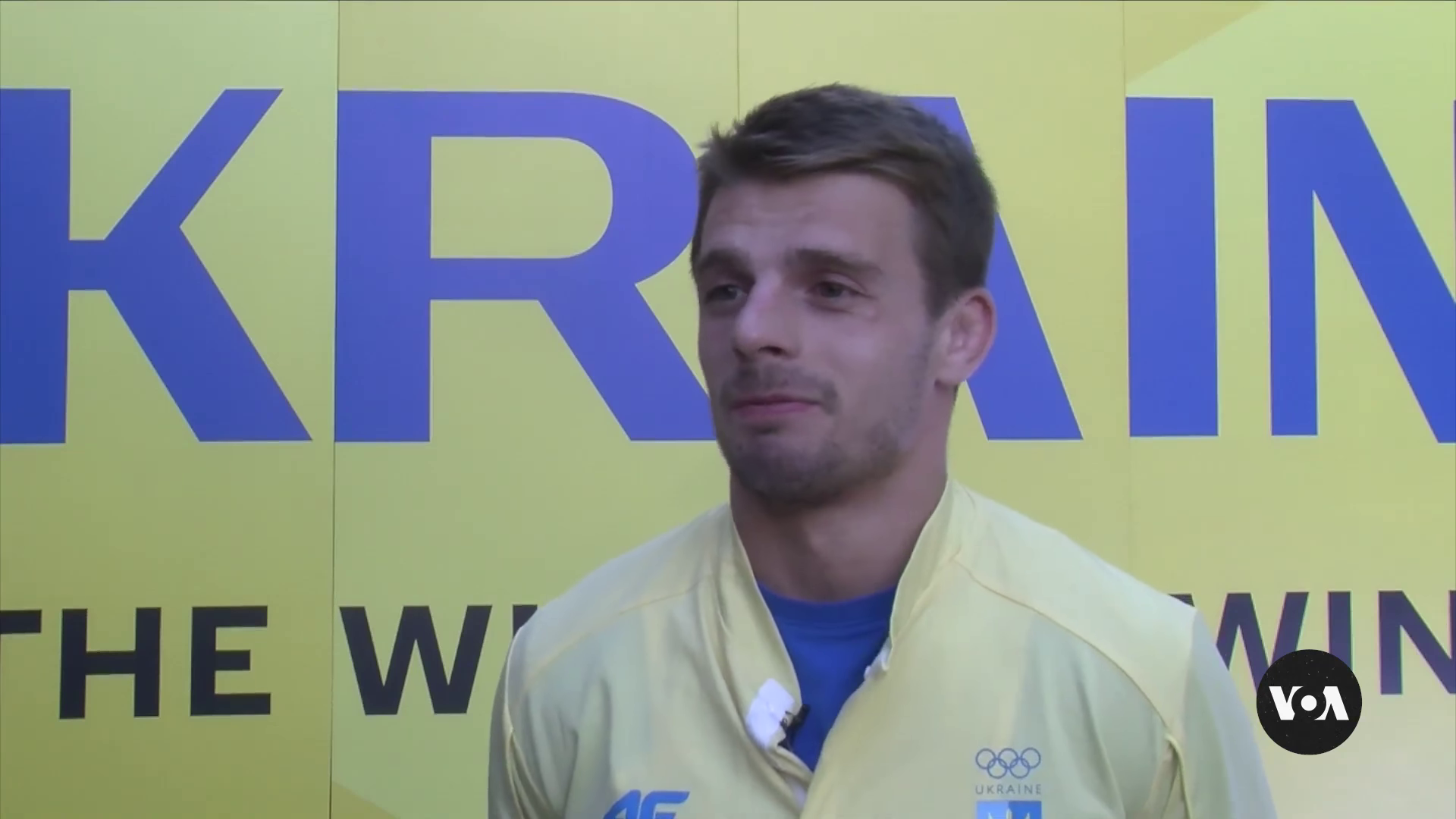
- Iadov in 2024

Personal information
- Born: 27 November 1996 (age 29)
- Occupation: Judoka
- Height: 172 cm (5 ft 8 in)

Sport
- Country: Ukraine
- Sport: Judo
- Weight class: ‍–‍66 kg

Achievements and titles
- Olympic Games: R16 (2024)
- World Champ.: 7th (2022)
- European Champ.: (gold) (2022)
Medal record
Men's judo
Representing Ukraine
European Championships
Gold medal – first place	2022 Sofia	‍–‍66 kg
Bronze medal – third place	2023 Montpellier	‍–‍66 kg
IJF Grand Slam
Gold medal – first place	2023 Paris	‍–‍66 kg
Bronze medal – third place	2019 Baku	‍–‍66 kg
Bronze medal – third place	2021 Abu Dhabi	‍–‍66 kg
Bronze medal – third place	2022 Tel Aviv	‍–‍66 kg
Bronze medal – third place	2023 Tbilisi	‍–‍66 kg
IJF Grand Prix
Silver medal – second place	2019 Tel Aviv	‍–‍66 kg
Bronze medal – third place	2018 Budapest	‍–‍66 kg
Bronze medal – third place	2022 Almada	‍–‍66 kg
Bronze medal – third place	2024 Linz	‍–‍66 kg
European Junior Championships
Silver medal – second place	2015 Oberwart	‍–‍66 kg
World Cadets Championships
Silver medal – second place	2013 Miami	‍–‍60 kg
European Cadet Championships
Silver medal – second place	2013 Tallinn	‍–‍60 kg
Youth Olympic Games
Silver medal – second place	2014 Nanjing	‍–‍66 kg

Profile at external databases
- IJF: 8256
- JudoInside.com: 74780
- Updated on 28 July 2024

Bogdan Iadov (Ukrainian: Богдан Костянтинович Ядов; born 27 November 1996) is a Ukrainian judoka.

== Career ==
Iadov is the silver medallist of the 2019 Judo Grand Slam Baku in the ‍–‍66 kg category.

At the 2021 Judo Grand Slam Abu Dhabi held in Abu Dhabi, United Arab Emirates, he won one of the bronze medals in his event.

In 2022, he won one of the bronze medals in his event at the 2022 Judo Grand Prix Almada held in Almada, Portugal. He won one of the bronze medals in his event at the 2022 Judo Grand Slam Tel Aviv held in Tel Aviv, Israel. Iadov is the winner of the Europe Championship in Sofia at 2022.
