= Vazha Margvelashvili =

Georgian judoka (born 1993)

Personal information
- Native name: ვაჟა მარგველაშვილი
- Born: 3 October 1993 (age 32) Gori, Georgia
- Occupation: Judoka
- Height: 170 cm (5 ft 7 in)

Sport
- Country: Georgia
- Sport: Judo
- Weight class: ‍–‍66 kg

Achievements and titles
- Olympic Games: (silver) (2020)
- World Champ.: (bronze) (2017, 2024)
- European Champ.: (gold) (2016, 2024)
Medal record
Men's judo
Representing Georgia
Olympic Games
Silver medal – second place	2020 Tokyo	‍–‍66 kg
World Championships
Bronze medal – third place	2017 Budapest	‍–‍66 kg
Bronze medal – third place	2024 Abu Dhabi	‍–‍66 kg
European Games
Bronze medal – third place	2019 Minsk	‍–‍66 kg
European Championships
Gold medal – first place	2016 Kazan	‍–‍66 kg
Gold medal – first place	2024 Zagreb	‍–‍66 kg
Silver medal – second place	2021 Lisbon	‍–‍66 kg
World Masters
Bronze medal – third place	2017 Saint Petersburg	‍–‍66 kg
Bronze medal – third place	2018 Guangzhou	‍–‍66 kg
Bronze medal – third place	2019 Qingdao	‍–‍66 kg
Bronze medal – third place	2021 Doha	‍–‍66 kg
IJF Grand Slam
Gold medal – first place	2018 Abu Dhabi	‍–‍66 kg
Gold medal – first place	2023 Tel Aviv	‍–‍66 kg
Gold medal – first place	2023 Abu Dhabi	‍–‍66 kg
Silver medal – second place	2019 Paris	‍–‍66 kg
Silver medal – second place	2020 Düsseldorf	‍–‍66 kg
Silver medal – second place	2021 Tbilisi	‍–‍66 kg
Bronze medal – third place	2017 Paris	‍–‍66 kg
Bronze medal – third place	2017 Abu Dhabi	‍–‍66 kg
Bronze medal – third place	2022 Paris	‍–‍66 kg
Bronze medal – third place	2022 Tbilisi	‍–‍66 kg
Bronze medal – third place	2025 Paris	‍–‍66 kg
IJF Grand Prix
Gold medal – first place	2016 Tbilisi	‍–‍66 kg
Gold medal – first place	2017 Düsseldorf	‍–‍66 kg
Gold medal – first place	2018 Tbilisi	‍–‍66 kg
Gold medal – first place	2018 The Hague	‍–‍66 kg
Bronze medal – third place	2015 Düsseldorf	‍–‍66 kg
Bronze medal – third place	2016 Havana	‍–‍66 kg
Bronze medal – third place	2016 Düsseldorf	‍–‍66 kg
European Junior Championships
Silver medal – second place	2012 Poreč	‍–‍60 kg

Profile at external databases
- IJF: 9546
- JudoInside.com: 73171
- Updated on 2 February 2025

Vazha Margvelashvili (Georgian: ვაჟა მარგველაშვილი; born 3 October 1993) is a Georgian judoka. He won the gold medal at the 2016 and the 2024 European Judo Championships, and the silver medal at the 2020 Summer Olympics in the men's 66 kg event.

In 2021, Margvelashvili won one of the bronze medals in his event at the 2021 Judo World Masters held in Doha, Qatar. A few months later, he won the silver medal in the men's 66 kg event at the 2021 European Judo Championships held in Lisbon, Portugal.

Margvelashvili won one of the bronze medals in his event at the 2022 Judo Grand Slam Paris held in Paris, France.
