= 2019 World Judo Championships – Men's 66 kg =

Judo competition

Judo Men's 66 kg at the 2019 World Judo Championships
- Venue: Nippon Budokan
- Location: Tokyo, Japan
- Date: 26 August
- Competitors: 92 from 73 nations
- Total prize money: 57,000$

Medalists
gold medal	Joshiro Maruyama (1st title)	Japan
silver medal	Kim Lim-hwan	South Korea
bronze medal	Hifumi Abe	Japan
bronze medal	Denis Vieru	Moldova

Competition at external databases
- Links: IJF • JudoInside

The Men's 66 kg competition at the 2019 World Judo Championships was held on 26 August 2019.

== Results ==
=== Finals ===
Semi-finals
(South Korea) Kim Lim-hwan	11
(Moldova) Denis Vieru	00
(Japan) Joshiro Maruyama	01
(Japan) Hifumi Abe	00

Final
(South Korea) Kim Lim-hwan	00
(Japan) Joshiro Maruyama	10

=== Repechage ===
Repechage
(Ukraine) Bogdan Iadov	00
(Italy) Manuel Lombardo	10

Third place
(Italy) Manuel Lombardo	00
(Japan) Hifumi Abe	10

Repechage
(Egypt) Mohamed Abdelmawgoud	01
(Mongolia) Baskhuu Yondonperenlei	10

Third place
(Mongolia) Baskhuu Yondonperenlei	00
(Moldova) Denis Vieru	10

=== Pool A ===
First round
(Argentina) Tal Almog	00
(Egypt) Ahmed Abdelrahman	01
(Germany) Sebastian Seidl	00
(South Korea) Kim Lim-hwan	10
(Uzbekistan) Shakhram Akhadov	10
(Madagascar) Marco Tolinantenaina	00
(Canada) Jacob Valois	10
(Kenya) John Kairabi	00
(Turkey) Sinan Sandal	10
(Democratic Republic of the Congo) Rodrick Kuku	00
(Peru) Juan Postigos	01
(Bulgaria) Bozhidar Temelkov	10
(Thailand) Surasak Puntanam	00
(Serbia) Strahinja Bunčić	01

Round of 64
(Georgia (country)) Vazha Margvelashvili	10
(Egypt) Ahmed Abdelrahman	00
(South Korea) Kim Lim-hwan	10
(Turkmenistan) Muhammet Kossekov	00
(Nepal) Indra Shreshta	00
(Uzbekistan) Shakhram Akhadov	10
(Chinese Taipei) Tsai Ming-yen	01
(Canada) Jacob Valois	00
(Brazil) Daniel Cargnin	10
(Turkey) Sinan Sandal	00
(Bulgaria) Bozhidar Temelkov	10
(Kazakhstan) Yeldos Zhumakanov	00
(Morocco) Abderrahmane Boushita	00
(Ukraine) Bogdan Iadov	10
(Niger) Ismael Alhassane	00
(Serbia) Strahinja Bunčić	10

Round of 32
(Georgia (country)) Vazha Margvelashvili	00
(South Korea) Kim Lim-hwan	10
(Uzbekistan) Shakhram Akhadov	10
(Chinese Taipei) Tsai Ming-yen	00
(Brazil) Daniel Cargnin	01
(Bulgaria) Bozhidar Temelkov	00
(Ukraine) Bogdan Iadov	10
(Serbia) Strahinja Bunčić	00

Round of 16
(South Korea) Kim Lim-hwan	01
(Uzbekistan) Shakhram Akhadov	00
(Brazil) Daniel Cargnin	00
(Ukraine) Bogdan Iadov	01

Quarterfinals
(South Korea) Kim Lim-hwan	10
(Ukraine) Bogdan Iadov	00

=== Pool B ===
First round
(Afghanistan) Abdul Fazli	10
(Tanzania) Thomas Mwenda	00
(Vietnam) Nguyễn Hai Bà	00
(Kyrgyzstan) Artur Te	10
(Belgium) Kenneth Van Gansbeke	00
(Belarus) Dzmitry Minkou	01
(Botswana) Gavin Mogopa	00
(Dominican Republic) Wander Mateo	10
(Kuwait) Hamad Al-Enezi	00
(Spain) Daniel Pérez	10
(Portugal) Sergiu Oleinic	00
(Republic of Ireland) Nathon Burns	10
(Poland) Patryk Wawrzyczek	01
(Guinea-Bissau) Diogo Cesar	00

Round of 64
(Israel) Baruch Shmailov	10
(Afghanistan) Abdul Fazli	00
(Russia) Mikhail Pulyaev	00
(Kyrgyzstan) Artur Te	10
(Mozambique) Kevin Loforte	00
(Italy) Manuel Lombardo	10
(Slovenia) Andraž Jereb	00
(Belarus) Dzmitry Minkou	10
(Moldova) Denis Vieru	01
(Dominican Republic) Wander Mateo	00
(Spain) Daniel Pérez	10
(Hong Kong) Mak Hong Nin	00
(Hungary) Bence Boros	01
(Republic of Ireland) Nathon Burns	00
(Philippines) Shugen Nakano	00
(Poland) Patryk Wawrzyczek	10

Round of 32
(Israel) Baruch Shmailov	01
(Kyrgyzstan) Artur Te	00
(Italy) Manuel Lombardo	01
(Belarus) Dzmitry Minkou	00
(Moldova) Denis Vieru	01
(Spain) Daniel Pérez	00
(Hungary) Bence Boros	00
(Poland) Patryk Wawrzyczek	11

Round of 16
(Israel) Baruch Shmailov	01
(Italy) Manuel Lombardo	10
(Moldova) Denis Vieru	10
(Poland) Patryk Wawrzyczek	00

Quarterfinals
(Italy) Manuel Lombardo	00
(Moldova) Denis Vieru	10

=== Pool C ===
First round
(Czech Republic) Pavel Petřikov	10
(India) Jasleen Saini	00
(Slovenia) Adrian Gomboc	10
(Hong Kong) Taylor Chow	00
(Albania) Indrit Cullhaj	10
(Qatar) Ayoub El-Idrissi	00
(Azerbaijan) Nijat Shikhalizada	10
(Vietnam) Ngô Xuân Quốc	00
(Afghanistan) Mod Aryan	00
(Belarus) Dzmitry Shershan	10
(Vanuatu) Joe Mahit	00
(United States) Alaa El Idrissi	10
(Mexico) Nabor Castillo	00
(Montenegro) Jusuf Nurković	10

Round of 64
(Japan) Joshiro Maruyama	11
(Czech Republic) Pavel Petřikov	00
(Macau) Chen Haozheng	00
(Slovenia) Adrian Gomboc	10
(Saudi Arabia) Abdulaziz Al-Bashi	00
(France) Kilian Le Blouch	10
(Uzbekistan) Sardor Nurillaev	11
(Albania) Indrit Cullhaj	00
(Kazakhstan) Yerlan Serikzhanov	01
(Azerbaijan) Nijat Shikhalizada	10
(Belarus) Dzmitry Shershan	00
(Kyrgyzstan) Almaz Altynbek	01
(Egypt) Mohamed Abdelmawgoud	10
(United States) Alaa El Idrissi	00
(Montenegro) Jusuf Nurković	10
(Pakistan) Hasnain Muhammad	00

Round of 32
(Japan) Joshiro Maruyama	10
(Slovenia) Adrian Gomboc	00
(France) Kilian Le Blouch	00
(Uzbekistan) Sardor Nurillaev	01
(Azerbaijan) Nijat Shikhalizada	01
(Kyrgyzstan) Almaz Altynbek	00
(Egypt) Mohamed Abdelmawgoud	10
(Montenegro) Jusuf Nurković	00

Round of 16
(Japan) Joshiro Maruyama	10
(Uzbekistan) Sardor Nurillaev	00
(Azerbaijan) Nijat Shikhalizada	01
(Egypt) Mohamed Abdelmawgoud	10

Quarterfinals
(Japan) Joshiro Maruyama	10
(Egypt) Mohamed Abdelmawgoud	00

=== Pool D ===
First round
(Tajikistan) Khaiyomiddin Zhabborov	00
(Spain) Alberto Gaitero	11
(Cuba) Osniel Solís	00
(China) Ma Duanbin	10
(Tanzania) Abdulrabi Abdulla	00
(Bosnia and Herzegovina) Petar Zadro	10
(Italy) Matteo Medves	01
(Portugal) João Crisóstomo	00
(Ukraine) Georgii Zantaraia	10
(Costa Rica) Ian Sancho	00
(Bhutan) Kinley Tshering	00
(Haiti) Gerard Cadet	01
(Georgia (country)) Bagrati Niniashvili	10
(Guinea) Moussa Kaba	00

Round of 64
(Japan) Hifumi Abe	10
(Spain) Alberto Gaitero	00
(Madagascar) Janeiro Chan Ling	00
(China) Ma Duanbin	10
(Myanmar) Aung Zayar Tun	00
(Bosnia and Herzegovina) Petar Zadro	11
(Italy) Matteo Medves	10
(Slovakia) Matej Poliak	00
(Israel) Tal Flicker	10
(Ukraine) Georgii Zantaraia	00
(Zambia) Steven Mungandu	10
(Haiti) Gerard Cadet	00
(Mongolia) Baskhuu Yondonperenlei	11
(South Korea) An Baul	00
(Georgia (country)) Bagrati Niniashvili	01
(Australia) Nathan Katz	00

Round of 32
(Japan) Hifumi Abe	11
(China) Ma Duanbin	00
(Bosnia and Herzegovina) Petar Zadro	00
(Italy) Matteo Medves	10
(Israel) Tal Flicker	01
(Zambia) Steven Mungandu	00
(Mongolia) Baskhuu Yondonperenlei	10
(Georgia (country)) Bagrati Niniashvili	00

Round of 16
(Japan) Hifumi Abe	10
(Italy) Matteo Medves	00
(Israel) Tal Flicker	00
(Mongolia) Baskhuu Yondonperenlei	10

Quarterfinals
(Japan) Hifumi Abe	01
(Mongolia) Baskhuu Yondonperenlei	00

== Prize money ==
The sums listed bring the total prizes awarded to 57,000$ for the individual event.

Medal	Total	Judoka	Coach
Gold	26,000$	20,800$	5,200$
Silver	15,000$	12,000$	3,000$
Bronze	8,000$	6,400$	1,600$
