= 2018 European Judo Championships – Men's 66 kg =

Judo competition

Judo Men's 66 kg at the 2018 European Judo Championships
- Venue: Expo Tel Aviv
- Location: Tel Aviv, Israel
- Date: 26 April

Medalists
gold medal	Adrian Gomboc (1st title)	Slovenia
silver medal	Matteo Medves	Italy
bronze medal	Dzmitry Shershan	Belarus
bronze medal	Tal Flicker	Israel

Competition at external databases
- Links: IJF • JudoInside

The men's 66 kg competition at the 2018 European Judo Championships was held on 26 April at the Expo Tel Aviv, in northern Tel Aviv, Israel.

== Results ==
=== Finals ===
Semi-finals
Marko Gušić (MNE)	00
Matteo Medves (ITA)	10
Adrian Gomboc (SLO)	10
Orkhan Safarov (AZE)	00

Final
Matteo Medves (ITA)	00
Adrian Gomboc (SLO)	10

=== Repechage ===
Repechage
Dzmitry Shershan (BLR)	10
Nijat Shikhalizada (AZE)	01

Third place
Dzmitry Shershan (BLR)	10
Orkhan Safarov (AZE)	00

Repechage
Tal Flicker (ISR)	10
João Crisóstomo (POR)	01

Third place
Tal Flicker (ISR)	10
Marko Gušić (MNE)	00

=== Pool A ===
First round
Vazha Margvelashvili (GEO)	00
Michel Adam (GER)	01
Dzmitry Shershan (BLR)	10
Matej Poliak (SVK)	00
Sergiu Oleinic (POR)	10
Alberto Gaitero Martin (ESP)	00
Indrit Cullhaj (ALB)	01
Marko Gušić (MNE)	10

Round of 16
Michel Adam (GER)	00
Dzmitry Shershan (BLR)	01
Sergiu Oleinic (POR)	00
Marko Gušić (MNE)	10

Quarterfinals
Dzmitry Shershan (BLR)	00
Marko Gušić (MNE)	01

=== Pool B ===
First round
Yakub Shamilov (RUS)	00
Zsolt Gorjánácz (HUN)	10
Kilian Le Blouch (FRA)	00
Matteo Medves (ITA)	01
Georgii Zantaraia (UKR)	10
Andraz Jereb (SLO)	00
Denis Vieru (MDA)	00
Nijat Shikhalizada (AZE)	10

Round of 16
Zsolt Gorjánácz (HUN)	00
Matteo Medves (ITA)	10
Georgii Zantaraia (UKR)	00
Nijat Shikhalizada (AZE)	10

Quarterfinals
Matteo Medves (ITA)	10
Nijat Shikhalizada (AZE)	01

=== Pool C ===
First round
Tal Flicker (ISR)	01
Nathon Burns (IRL)	00
Daniel Jean (FRA)	00
Vadim Bunescu (MDA)	01
Adrian Gomboc (SLO)	10
Hevorh Khachatrian (UKR)	00
Jusuf Nurković (MNE)	00
Sinan Sandal (TUR)	10

Round of 16
Tal Flicker (ISR)	10
Vadim Bunescu (MDA)	00
Adrian Gomboc (SLO)	10
Sinan Sandal (TUR)	00

Quarterfinals
Tal Flicker (ISR)	00
Adrian Gomboc (SLO)	01

=== Pool D ===
First round
Baruch Shmailov (ISR)	10
Manuel Scheibel (GER)	00
Bernard Azinović (CRO)	00
Orkhan Safarov (AZE)	10
Dzmitry Minkou (BLR)	00
João Crisóstomo (POR)	10
Manuel Lombardo (ITA)	01
Petar Zadro (BIH)	00

Round of 16
Baruch Shmailov (ISR)	00
Orkhan Safarov (AZE)	01
João Crisóstomo (POR)	11
Manuel Lombardo (ITA)	01

Quarterfinals
Orkhan Safarov (AZE)	10
João Crisóstomo (POR)	00
