= Judo at the 2019 European Games – Men's 66 kg =

Judo competition

Judo Men's 66 kg at the 2019 European Games
- Venue: Čyžoŭka-Arena
- Location: Minsk, Belarus
- Date: 22 June
- Competitors: 33 from 25 nations

Medalists
gold medal	Georgii Zantaraia (2nd title)	Ukraine
silver medal	Matteo Medves	Italy
bronze medal	Bagrati Niniashvili	Georgia
bronze medal	Vazha Margvelashvili	Georgia

Competition at external databases
- Links: IJF • JudoInside

The men's 66 kg judo event at the 2019 European Games in Minsk was held on 22 June at the Čyžoŭka-Arena.

== Results ==
=== Final ===
Semi-finals
Vazha Margvelashvili (GEO)	00
Matteo Medves (ITA)	01
Bagrati Niniashvili (GEO)	00
Georgii Zantaraia (UKR)	10

Final
Matteo Medves (ITA)	00
Georgii Zantaraia (UKR)	10

=== Repechage ===
Repechage
Pavel Petřikov (CZE)	01
Nathon Burns (IRL)	00

Third place
Pavel Petřikov (CZE)	00
Bagrati Niniashvili (GEO)	10

Repechage
Denis Vieru (MDA)	10
Dzmitry Shershan (BLR)	00

Third place
Denis Vieru (MDA)	00
Vazha Margvelashvili (GEO)	10

=== Pool A ===
Round of 64

Round of 32
Vazha Margvelashvili (GEO)	01
Strahinja Bunčić (SRB)	00
Vadim Bunescu (MDA)	01
Daniel Pérez (ESP)	00
Nijat Shikhalizada (AZE)	00
Bogdan Iadov (UKR)	01
Pavel Petřikov (CZE)	10
Dzmitry Minkou (BLR)	01

Round of 16
Vazha Margvelashvili (GEO)	11
Vadim Bunescu (MDA)	00
Bogdan Iadov (UKR)	00
Pavel Petřikov (CZE)	01

Quarterfinals
Vazha Margvelashvili (GEO)	10
Pavel Petřikov (CZE)	00

=== Pool B ===
Round of 64
Kenneth Van Gansbeke (BEL)	10
Sinan Sandal (TUR)	01

Round of 32
Adrian Gomboc (SLO)	10
Indrit Cullhaj (ALB)	00
Matteo Medves (ITA)	11
Zsolt Gorjánácz (HUN)	00
Yakub Shamilov (RUS)	00
Kenneth Van Gansbeke (BEL)	10
Nathon Burns (IRL)	11
João Crisóstomo (POR)	00

Round of 16
Adrian Gomboc (SLO)	00
Matteo Medves (ITA)	01
Kenneth Van Gansbeke (BEL)	00
Nathon Burns (IRL)	01

Quarterfinals
Matteo Medves (ITA)	10
Nathon Burns (IRL)	00

=== Pool C ===
Round of 64

Round of 32
Denis Vieru (MDA)	01
Petar Zadro (BIH)	00
Matej Poliak (SVK)	00
Yarin Menaged (ISR)	10
Alberto Gaitero (ESP)	10
Patryk Wawrzyczek (POL)	00
Kilian Le Blouch (FRA)	00
Bagrati Niniashvili (GEO)	11

Round of 16
Denis Vieru (MDA)	10
Yarin Menaged (ISR)	00
Alberto Gaitero (ESP)	00
Bagrati Niniashvili (GEO)	10

Quarterfinals
Denis Vieru (MDA)	00
Bagrati Niniashvili (GEO)	01

=== Pool D ===
Round of 64

Round of 32
Georgii Zantaraia (UKR)	11
Jeremy Saywell (MLT)	00
Sergiu Oleinic (POR)	00
Andraž Jereb (SLO)	01
Manuel Lombardo (ITA)	10
Sebastian Seidl (GER)	00
Dzmitry Shershan (BLR)	01
Andrej Klokov (LTU)	00

Round of 16
Georgii Zantaraia (UKR)	10
Andraž Jereb (SLO)	00
Manuel Lombardo (ITA)	00
Dzmitry Shershan (BLR)	10

Quarterfinals
Georgii Zantaraia (UKR)	01
Dzmitry Shershan (BLR)	00
