= 2017 World Judo Championships – Men's 66 kg =

Judo competition

Judo Men's 66 kg at the 2017 World Judo Championships
- Venue: László Papp Budapest Sports Arena
- Location: Budapest, Hungary
- Dates: 29 August
- Competitors: 72 from 59 nations
- Total prize money: 57,000$

Medalists
| gold medal | Hifumi Abe (1st title) | Japan |
| silver medal | Mikhail Pulyaev | Russia |
| bronze medal | Vazha Margvelashvili | Georgia |
| bronze medal | Tal Flicker | Israel |

Competition at external databases
- Links: IJF • JudoInside

The Men's 66 kg competition at the 2017 World Judo Championships was held on 29 August 2017.

== Results ==
=== Finals ===
Semi-finals
(Israel) Tal Flicker | 00
(Russia) Mikhail Pulyaev | 01
(Georgia (country)) Vazha Margvelashvili | 00
(Japan) Hifumi Abe | 11

Final
(Russia) Mikhail Pulyaev | 00
(Japan) Hifumi Abe | 10

=== Repechage ===
Repechage
(Belarus) Dzmitry Minkou | 00
(South Korea) Kim Lim-hwan | 10

Third place
(South Korea) Kim Lim-hwan | 01
(Georgia (country)) Vazha Margvelashvili | 11

Repechage
(South Korea) An Ba-ul | 00
(Ukraine) Georgii Zantaraia | 01

Third place
(Ukraine) Georgii Zantaraia | 00
(Israel) Tal Flicker | 01

=== Pool A ===
First round
(Cuba) Osniel Solís | 01
(Germany) Sebastian Seidl | 00
(Spain) Alberto Gaitero | 01
(Morocco) Imad Bassou | 00

Round of 64
(Israel) Tal Flicker | 10
(Cuba) Osniel Solís | 00
(Zimbabwe) Brian Chiminya | 00
(Qatar) Ayoub El-Idrissi | 10
(Dominican Republic) Wander Mateo | 11
(Chile) Juan Pérez | 00
(Poland) Aleksander Beta | 00
(Kyrgyzstan) Almaz Altynbek Uulu | 10
(Portugal) Sergiu Oleinic | 00
(Spain) Alberto Gaitero | 01
(Turkey) Sinan Sandal | 11
(Nicaragua) Yader Mairena | 00
(Australia) Nathan Katz | 01
(Philippines) Shugen Nakano | 00
(Belarus) Dzmitry Minkou | 01
(Bosnia and Herzegovina) Petra Zadro | 00

Round of 32
(Israel) Tal Flicker | 01
(Qatar) Ayoub El-Idrissi | 00
(Dominican Republic) Wander Mateo | 01
(Kyrgyzstan) Almaz Altynbek Uulu | 00
(Spain) Alberto Gaitero | 00
(Turkey) Sinan Sandal | 10
(Australia) Nathan Katz | 00
(Belarus) Dzmitry Minkou | 10

Round of 16
(Israel) Tal Flicker | 01
(Dominican Republic) Wander Mateo | 00
(Turkey) Sinan Sandal | 00
(Belarus) Dzmitry Minkou | 00

Quarterfinals
(Israel) Tal Flicker | 01
(Belarus) Dzmitry Minkou | 00

=== Pool B ===
First round
(Moldova) Denis Vieru | 02
(Saudi Arabia) Eisa Majrashi | 00
(South Korea) Kim Lim-hwan | 03
(Serbia) Strahinja Bunčić | 00

Round of 64
(Israel) Baruch Shmailov | 10
(Algeria) Houd Zourdani | 00
(Benin) Auguste Daga | 00
(Peru) Juan Postigos | 10
(Republic of Ireland) Nathon Burns | 11
(Niger) Ismael Alhassane | 00
(Moldova) Denis Vieru | 00
(Russia) Mikhail Pulyaev | 02
(Azerbaijan) Nijat Shikhalizada | 00
(Kazakhstan) Yeldos Zhumakanov | 10
(Mexico) Ángel Hernández | 11
(Zambia) Steven Mungandu | 00
(Mozambique) Kevin Loforte | 00
(Ukraine) Gevorg Khachatrian | 06
(Djibouti) Mohamed Habtu | 00
(South Korea) Kim Lim-hwan | 10

Round of 32
(Israel) Baruch Shmailov | 10
(Peru) Juan Postigos | 00
(Republic of Ireland) Nathon Burns | 00
(Russia) Mikhail Pulyaev | 11
(Kazakhstan) Yeldos Zhumakanov | 10
(Mexico) Ángel Hernández | 00
(Ukraine) Gevorg Khachatrian | 01
(South Korea) Kim Lim-hwan | 11

Round of 16
(Israel) Baruch Shmailov | 00
(Russia) Mikhail Pulyaev | 11
(Kazakhstan) Yeldos Zhumakanov | 00
(South Korea) Kim Lim-hwan | 01

Quarterfinals
(Russia) Mikhail Pulyaev | 01
(South Korea) Kim Lim-hwan | 00

=== Pool C ===
First round
(Slovenia) Andraz Jereb | 10
(Togo) Adebayo Olympio | 00
(United States) Ryan Vargas | 10
(Albania) Indrit Cullhaj | 00

Round of 64
(South Korea) An Ba-ul | 01
(Spain) Gar Uriarte | 00
(Italy) Fabio Basile | 01
(Palestine) Simon Yacoub | 00
(Uzbekistan) Sardor Nurillaev | 10
(Mongolia) Ganbold Kherlen | 00
(Slovenia) Andraz Jereb | 00
(Belgium) Kenneth Van Gansbeke | 10
(Georgia (country)) Vazha Margvelashvili | 10
(Jordan) Bilal Eiealsalman | 00
(Saudi Arabia) Sulaiman Hamad | 00
(South Africa) Siyabulela Mabulu | 10
(Vanuatu) Joe Mahit | 00
(United States) Ryan Vargas | 11
(Malta) Jeremy Saywell | 00
(China) Ren Jiawen | 10

Round of 32
(South Korea) An Ba-ul | 01
(Italy) Fabio Basile | 01
(Uzbekistan) Sardor Nurillaev | 00
(Belgium) Kenneth Van Gansbeke | 10
(Georgia (country)) Vazha Margvelashvili | 10
(South Africa) Siyabulela Mabulu | 00
(United States) Ryan Vargas | 01
(China) Ren Jiawen | 00

Round of 16
(South Korea) An Ba-ul | 01
(Belgium) Kenneth Van Gansbeke | 00
(Georgia (country)) Vazha Margvelashvili | 11
(United States) Ryan Vargas | 00

Quarterfinals
(South Korea) An Ba-ul | 00
(Georgia (country)) Vazha Margvelashvili | 10

=== Pool D ===
First round
(Guinea-Bissau) Diogo Cesar | 00
(Kyrgyzstan) Artur Te | 01
(Hong Kong) Lee Yuk Ting | 00
(Canada) Antoine Bouchard | 11

Round of 64
(Japan) Hifumi Abe | 10
(Kyrgyzstan) Artur Te | 00
(Morocco) Abderrahmane Boushita | 11
(Botswana) Gavin Mogopa | 00
(Mexico) Nabor Castillo | 11
(Dominican Republic) José Geronimo | 00
(Portugal) João Crisóstomo | 01
(Lithuania) Kęstutis Vitkauskas | 00
(Brazil) Charles Chibana | 01
(Kazakhstan) Azamat Mukanov | 00
(France) Kilian Le Blouch | 01
(Canada) Antoine Bouchard | 00
(Costa Rica) Ian Sancho | 01
(Mozambique) Artur Carlos | 00
(Zambia) Mathews Punza | 00
(Ukraine) Georgii Zantaraia | 10

Round of 32
(Japan) Hifumi Abe | 10
(Morocco) Abderrahmane Boushita | 00
(Mexico) Nabor Castillo | 00
(Portugal) João Crisóstomo | 10
(Brazil) Charles Chibana | 00
(France) Kilian Le Blouch | 10
(Costa Rica) Ian Sancho | 00
(Ukraine) Georgii Zantaraia | 02

Round of 16
(Japan) Hifumi Abe | 03
(Portugal) João Crisóstomo | 00
(France) Kilian Le Blouch | 00
(Ukraine) Georgii Zantaraia | 01

Quarterfinals
(Japan) Hifumi Abe | 12
(Ukraine) Georgii Zantaraia | 00

== Prize money ==
The sums listed bring the total prizes awarded to 57,000$ for the individual event.

| Medal | Total | Judoka | Coach |
|---|---|---|---|
| Gold | 26,000$ | 20,800$ | 5,200$ |
| Silver | 15,000$ | 12,000$ | 3,000$ |
| Bronze | 8,000$ | 6,400$ | 1,600$ |
