= 2020 European Judo Championships – Men's 66 kg =

Judo competition

Judo Men's 66 kg at the 2020 European Judo Championships
- Venue: O2 Arena
- Location: Prague, Czech Republic
- Date: 19 November
- Competitors: 32 from 23 nations

Medalists
gold medal	Orkhan Safarov (1st title)	Azerbaijan
silver medal	Tal Flicker	Israel
bronze medal	Denis Vieru	Moldova
bronze medal	Kilian Le Blouch	France

Competition at external databases
- Links: IJF • JudoInside

The men's 66 kg competition at the 2020 European Judo Championships was held on 19 November at the O2 Arena.

== Results ==
=== Final ===
Final
Orkhan Safarov (AZE)	10
Tal Flicker (ISR)	01

=== Repechage ===
Repechage
Sebastian Seidl (GER)	00
Denis Vieru (MDA)	01

Third place
Denis Vieru (MDA)	01
Vazha Margvelashvili (GEO)	00

Repechage
Kilian Le Blouch (FRA)	10
Daniel Pérez (ESP)	00

Third place
Kilian Le Blouch (FRA)	11
Strahinja Bunčić (SRB)	01

=== Top half ===
Round of 32
Manuel Lombardo (ITA)	00
Orkhan Safarov (AZE)	10
Matej Poliak (SVK)	10
Elias Körkkö (FIN)	00
Abdula Abdulzhalilov (RUS)	10
Kenneth Van Gansbeke (BEL)	00
Sebastian Seidl (GER)	10
Bozhidar Temelkov (BUL)	00
Alberto Gaitero (ESP)	10
Petr Zhukov (ROU)	00
Denis Vieru (MDA)	10
Nathon Burns (IRL)	01
Georgii Zantaraia (UKR)	10
João Crisóstomo (POR)	00
Pavel Petřikov (CZE)	00
Strahinja Bunčić (SRB)	01

Round of 16
Orkhan Safarov (AZE)	01
Matej Poliak (SVK)	00
Abdula Abdulzhalilov (RUS)	00
Sebastian Seidl (GER)	10
Alberto Gaitero (ESP)	00
Denis Vieru (MDA)	01
Georgii Zantaraia (UKR)	00
Strahinja Bunčić (SRB)	10

Quarterfinals
Orkhan Safarov (AZE)	01
Sebastian Seidl (GER)	00
Denis Vieru (MDA)	00
Strahinja Bunčić (SRB)	10

Semifinals
Orkhan Safarov (AZE)	10
Strahinja Bunčić (SRB)	01

=== Bottom half ===
Round of 32
Vazha Margvelashvili (GEO)	10
Mikhail Pulyaev (RUS)	00
Ivo Verhorstert (NED)	00
Lucian Borş Dumitrescu (ROU)	01
Adrian Gomboc (SLO)	00
Kilian Le Blouch (FRA)	10
Vadim Bunescu (MDA)	00
Nijat Shikhalizada (AZE)	10
Baruch Shmailov (ISR)	00
Bogdan Iadov (UKR)	10
Dzmitry Muzhaila (BLR)	00
Daniel Pérez (ESP)	10
Tal Flicker (ISR)	10
Luukas Saha (FIN)	00
Sergiu Oleinic (POR)	10
Dániel Szegedi (HUN)	00

Round of 16
Vazha Margvelashvili (GEO)	10
Lucian Borş Dumitrescu (ROU)	00
Kilian Le Blouch (FRA)	10
Nijat Shikhalizada (AZE)	00
Bogdan Iadov (UKR)	00
Daniel Pérez (ESP)	10
Tal Flicker (ISR)	11
Sergiu Oleinic (POR)	00

Quarterfinals
Vazha Margvelashvili (GEO)	01
Kilian Le Blouch (FRA)	00
Daniel Pérez (ESP)	00
Tal Flicker (ISR)	10

Semifinals
Vazha Margvelashvili (GEO)	00
Tal Flicker (ISR)	01
