= 2018 European Judo Championships – Men's 60 kg =

Judo competition

Judo Men's 60 kg at the 2018 European Judo Championships
- Venue: Expo Tel Aviv
- Location: Tel Aviv, Israel
- Date: 26 April

Medalists
gold medal	Islam Yashuev (1st title)	Russia
silver medal	Yanislav Gerchev	Bulgaria
bronze medal	Beslan Mudranov	Russia
bronze medal	Ashley McKenzie	Great Britain

Competition at external databases
- Links: IJF • JudoInside

The men's 60 kg competition at the 2018 European Judo Championships was held on 26 April at the Expo Tel Aviv.

== Results ==
=== Finals ===
Semi-finals
Yanislav Gerchev (BUL)	10
Artem Lesiuk (UKR)	00
Amiran Papinashvili (GEO)	00
Islam Yashuev (RUS)	01

Final
Yanislav Gerchev (BUL)	00
Islam Yashuev (RUS)	10

=== Repechage ===
Repechage
Francisco Garrigós (ESP)	00
Beslan Mudranov (RUS)	01

Third place
Beslan Mudranov (RUS)	01
Amiran Papinashvili (GEO)	00

Repechage
Csaba Szabó (HUN)	00
Ashley McKenzie (GBR)	10

Third place
Ashley McKenzie (GBR)	10
Artem Lesiuk (UKR)	01

=== Pool A ===
First round
Alon Aharon (ISR)	00
Jorre Verstraeten (BEL)	10

Round of 16
Francisco Garrigós (ESP)	10
Gonçalo Mansinho (POR)	00
Yanislav Gerchev (BUL)	01
Jorre Verstraeten (BEL)	00

Quarterfinals
Francisco Garrigós (ESP)	00
Yanislav Gerchev (BUL)	01

=== Pool B ===
First round
Vugar Shirinli (AZE)	00
Beslan Mudranov (RUS)	10

Round of 16
Lukhumi Chkhvimiani (GEO)	00
Beslan Mudranov (RUS)	01
Bekir Özlü (TUR)	00
Artem Lesiuk (UKR)	10

Quarterfinals
Beslan Mudranov (RUS)	01
Artem Lesiuk (UKR)	11

=== Pool C ===
First round
Valentin Alipiev (BUL)	11
Joran Schildermans (BEL)	00

Round of 16
Amiran Papinashvili (GEO)	10
Valentin Alipiev (BUL)	00
Walide Khyar (FRA)	00
Csaba Szabó (HUN)	10

Quarterfinals
Amiran Papinashvili (GEO)	01
Csaba Szabó (HUN)	00

=== Pool D ===
First round
Tornike Tsjakadoea (NED)	10
Matjaž Trbovc (SLO)	00

Round of 16
Ashley McKenzie (GBR)	10
Tornike Tsjakadoea (NED)	00
Islam Yashuev (RUS)	01
Pavel Petřikov (CZE)	00

Quarterfinals
Ashley McKenzie (GBR)	00
Islam Yashuev (RUS)	10
