= Judo at the 2015 European Games – Men's 60 kg =

Judo competition

Judo Men's 60 kg at the 2015 European Games
- Venue: Heydar Aliyev Arena
- Location: Baku, Azerbaijan
- Date: 25 June
- Competitors: 26 from 24 nations

Medalists
gold medal	Beslan Mudranov (3rd title)	Russia
silver medal	Orkhan Safarov	Azerbaijan
bronze medal	Ludovic Chammartin	Switzerland
bronze medal	Amiran Papinashvili	Georgia

Competition at external databases
- Links: IJF • JudoInside

The men's 60 kg judo event at the 2015 European Games in Baku was held on 25 June at the Heydar Aliyev Arena.

== Results ==
=== Final ===
Final
Orkhan Safarov (AZE)	000
Beslan Mudranov (RUS)	100

=== Repechage ===
Repechage
Ludovic Chammartin (SUI)	011
Hovhannes Davtyan (ARM)	000

Third place
Ludovic Chammartin (SUI)	010
Jeroen Mooren (NED)	000

Repechage
Amiran Papinashvili (GEO)	011
Tobias Englmaier (GER)	000

Third place
Amiran Papinashvili (GEO)	100
Francisco Garrigós (ESP)	000

=== Top half ===
Round of 32
Yann Siccardi (MON)	000
Arif Bagirov (BLR)	010
Ludwig Paischer (AUT)	000
Juho Reinvall (FIN)	000
Ludovic Chammartin (SUI)	000
Yanislav Gerchev (BUL)	000
Francisco Garrigós (ESP)	111
Alon Rahima (ISR)	000
Matjaž Trbovc (SLO)	110
Ahmet Kaba (TUR)	001

Round of 16
Orkhan Safarov (AZE)	012
Arif Bagirov (BLR)	010
Ludwig Paischer (AUT)	000
Ludovic Chammartin (SUI)	100
Ilgar Mushkiyev (AZE)	000
Francisco Garrigós (ESP)	001
Hovhannes Davtyan (ARM)	010
Matjaž Trbovc (SLO)	000

Quarterfinals
Orkhan Safarov (AZE)	011
Ludovic Chammartin (SUI)	000
Francisco Garrigós (ESP)	000
Hovhannes Davtyan (ARM)	000

Semifinals
Orkhan Safarov (AZE)	000
Francisco Garrigós (ESP)	000

=== Bottom half ===
Round of 32
Amado Lazea (ROU)	000
Artiom Arshanski (ISR)	100
Vincent Limare (FRA)	000
Jeroen Mooren (NED)	010
Ashley McKenzie (GBR)	000
Carmine Di Loreto (ITA)	000
Pavel Petřikov (CZE)	000
Nuno Carvalho (POR)	000
Tom Schmit (LUX)	000
Łukasz Kiełbasiński (POL)	100

Round of 16
Amiran Papinashvili (GEO)	000
Artiom Arshanski (ISR)	000
Jeroen Mooren (NED)	011
Ashley McKenzie (GBR)	000
Beslan Mudranov (RUS)	111
Pavel Petřikov (CZE)	000
Tobias Englmaier (GER)	100
Łukasz Kiełbasiński (POL)	000

Quarterfinals
Amiran Papinashvili (GEO)	000
Jeroen Mooren (NED)	101
Beslan Mudranov (RUS)	001
Tobias Englmaier (GER)	001

Semifinals
Jeroen Mooren (NED)	000
Beslan Mudranov (RUS)	100
