= 2017 European Judo Championships – Men's 66 kg =

Judo competition

Judo Men's 66 kg at the 2017 European Judo Championships
- Venue: Torwar Hall
- Location: Warsaw, Poland
- Date: April 20, 2017
- Competitors: 31 from 23 nations

Medalists
gold medal	Georgii Zantaraia (1st title)	Ukraine
silver medal	Adrian Gomboc	Slovenia
bronze medal	Nijat Shikhalizade	Azerbaijan
bronze medal	Matej Poliak	Slovakia

Competition at external databases
- Links: IJF • JudoInside

The men's 66 kg competition at the 2017 European Judo Championships was held on 20 April at the Torwar Hall in Warsaw, Poland.

== Results ==
=== Finals ===
Semi-finals
Georgii Zantaraia (UKR)	01
Matej Poliak (SVK)	00
Nijat Shikhalizade (AZE)	00
Adrian Gomboc (SLO)	10

Final
Georgii Zantaraia (UKR)	10
Adrian Gomboc (SLO)	00

=== Repechages ===
Repechage		Bronze medal
Dzmitry Minkou (BLR)	02
Sinan Sandal (TUR)	01	Dzmitry Minkou (BLR)	00
		Nijat Shikhalizade (AZE)	10

Repechage		Bronze medal
Kamal Khan-Magomedov (RUS)	00
Baruch Shmailov (ISR)	01	Baruch Shmailov (ISR)	00
		Matej Poliak (SVK)	01

=== Pool A ===
First round		Second round		Quarterfinals
		Tal Flicker (ISR)	00
Andrej Klokov (LTU)	00	Dzmitry Minkou (BLR)	10
Dzmitry Minkou (BLR)	01			Dzmitry Minkou (BLR)	00
Georgii Zantaraia (UKR)	01			Georgii Zantaraia (UKR)	10
Patryk Wawrzyczek (POL)	00	Georgii Zantaraia (UKR)	02
Matteo Medves (ITA)	10	Matteo Medves (ITA)	01
Alexandre Mariac (FRA)	00

=== Pool B ===
First round		Second round		Quarterfinals
Vazha Margvelashvili (GEO)	12
Gar Uriarte (ESP)	00	Vazha Margvelashvili (GEO)	00
Anastasios Kesidis (CYP)	00	Matej Poliak (SVK)	10
Matej Poliak (SVK)	01			Matej Poliak (SVK)	01
Sergiu Oleinic (POR)	10			Sinan Sandal (TUR)	00
Strahinja Bunčić (SRB)	00	Sergiu Oleinic (POR)	00
Kenneth Van Gansbeke (BEL)	00	Sinan Sandal (TUR)	01
Sinan Sandal (TUR)	01

=== Pool C ===
First round		Second round		Quarterfinals
Nijat Shikhalizade (AZE)	10
Manuel Scheibel (GER)	00	Nijat Shikhalizade (AZE)	11
Jasper Lefevere (BEL)	10	Jasper Lefevere (BEL)	00
Christos Trikomitis (CYP)	00			Nijat Shikhalizade (AZE)	01
Kamal Khan-Magomedov (RUS)	01			Kamal Khan-Magomedov (RUS)	00
Andreas Tiefgraber (AUT)	00	Kamal Khan-Magomedov (RUS)	02
Mykolas Lukoševičius (LTU)	00	Aleksander Beta (POL)	00
Aleksander Beta (POL)	11

=== Pool D ===
First round		Second round		Quarterfinals
Baruch Shmailov (ISR)	11
Denis Vieru (MDA)	00	Baruch Shmailov (ISR)	01
Marko Vukićević (SRB)	00	Bogdan Iadov (UKR)	00
Bogdan Iadov (UKR)	02			Baruch Shmailov (ISR)	00
Adrian Gomboc (SLO)	01			Adrian Gomboc (SLO)	10
João Crisóstomo (POR)	00	Adrian Gomboc (SLO)	10
Petar Zadro (BIH)	02	Petar Zadro (BIH)	00
Jusuf Nurković (MNE)	00
