= 2017 World Judo Championships – Men's 60 kg =

Judo competition

Judo Men's 60 kg at the 2017 World Judo Championships
- Venue: László Papp Budapest Sports Arena
- Location: Budapest, Hungary
- Dates: 28 August
- Competitors: 59 from 50 nations
- Total prize money: 57,000$

Medalists
gold medal	Naohisa Takato (2nd title)	Japan
silver medal	Orkhan Safarov	Azerbaijan
bronze medal	Ganbatyn Boldbaatar	Mongolia
bronze medal	Diyorbek Urozboev	Uzbekistan

Competition at external databases
- Links: IJF • JudoInside

The Men's 60 kg competition at the 2017 World Judo Championships was held on 28 August 2017.

== Results ==
=== Finals ===
Semi-finals
(Uzbekistan) Diyorbek Urozboev	00
(Azerbaijan) Orkhan Safarov	11
(Japan) Naohisa Takato	01
(Czech Republic) Pavel Petřikov	00

Final
(Azerbaijan) Orkhan Safarov	00
(Japan) Naohisa Takato	11

=== Repechage ===
Repechage		Third place
(Mongolia) Ganbatyn Boldbaatar	01
(Kazakhstan) Yeldos Smetov	00	(Mongolia) Ganbatyn Boldbaatar	01
		(Czech Republic) Pavel Petřikov	00

Repechage		Third place
(Uzbekistan) Mukhriddin Tilovov	01
(Kazakhstan) Gusman Kyrgyzbayev	00	(Uzbekistan) Mukhriddin Tilovov	00
		(Uzbekistan) Diyorbek Urozboev	01

=== Pool A ===
First Round
(Australia) Josh Katz	00
(Monaco) Yann Siccardi	10
(Israel) Daniel Ben David	02
(Uzbekistan) Diyorbek Urozboev	11
(Angola) Nayr Garcia Pedro	11
(Peru) Dilmer Calle	00
(Japan) Ryuju Nagayama	10
(United Kingdom) Ashley McKenzie	00
(Ecuador) Lenin Preciado	01
(Kyrgyzstan) Baiaman Saynbai Uulu	00
(Eswatini) Nkululeko Sihlongonyane	00
(France) Walide Khyar	10
(Mongolia) Ganbatyn Boldbaatar	00
(Turkey) Bekir Özlü	00

Second Round
(Georgia (country)) Amiran Papinashvili	02
(Monaco) Yann Siccardi	00
(Uzbekistan) Diyorbek Urozboev	11
(Angola) Nayr Garcia Pedro	00
(Japan) Ryuju Nagayama	10
(Ecuador) Lenin Preciado	00
(France) Walide Khyar	00
(Mongolia) Ganbatyn Boldbaatar	01

Third Round
(Georgia (country)) Amiran Papinashvili	00
(Uzbekistan) Diyorbek Urozboev	10
(Japan) Ryuju Nagayama	00
(Mongolia) Ganbatyn Boldbaatar	01

Quarterfinals
(Uzbekistan) Diyorbek Urozboev	10
(Mongolia) Ganbatyn Boldbaatar	00

=== Pool B ===
First Round
(Kazakhstan) Yeldos Smetov	10
(Mozambique) Neuso Sigauque	00
(India) Vijay Kumar Yadav	00
(Iran) Mohammad Rashnonezhad	01
(Cuba) Yandry Torres Marimon	10
(Morocco) Mohamed Jafy	00
(Zimbabwe) Tapiwa Pavari	00
(Bulgaria) Yanislav Gerchev	10
(Czech Republic) David Pulkrabek	01
(Guatemala) Julio Molina	00
(Aruba) Isaac Croes	00
(Portugal) Gonçalo Mansinho	01

Second Round
(Brazil) Eric Takabatake	00
(Kazakhstan) Yeldos Smetov	01
(Iran) Mohammad Rashnonezhad	11
(Cuba) Yandry Torres Marimon	00
(Azerbaijan) Orkhan Safarov	10
(Bulgaria) Yanislav Gerchev	00
(Czech Republic) David Pulkrabek	00
(Portugal) Gonçalo Mansinho	01

Third Round
(Kazakhstan) Yeldos Smetov	11
(Iran) Mohammad Rashnonezhad	00
(Azerbaijan) Orkhan Safarov	10
(Portugal) Gonçalo Mansinho	00

Quarterfinals
(Kazakhstan) Yeldos Smetov	00
(Azerbaijan) Orkhan Safarov	10

=== Pool C ===
First Round
(Morocco) Yassine Moudatir	10
(Kenya) Carlos Atieno	00
(Kyrgyzstan) Otar Bestaev	01
(Nicaragua) Luis Montes	00
(United States) Adonis Dias	00
(South Korea) Jeon Seung-beom	01
(Russia) Robert Mshvidobadze	00
(Brazil) Phelipe Pelim	11
(Seychelles) Jean Michel Vidot	00
(Dominican Republic) Elmert Ramirez	12
(Macau) Ng Lei-wai	00
(Botswana) Edwin Sellot	02
(Uzbekistan) Mukhriddin Tilovov	01
(Slovenia) Matjaž Trbovc	00

Second Round
(Japan) Naohisa Takato	12
(Morocco) Yassine Moudatir	00
(Kyrgyzstan) Otar Bestaev	01
(South Korea) Jeon Seung-beom	02
(Brazil) Phelipe Pelim	04
(Dominican Republic) Elmert Ramirez	00
(Botswana) Edwin Sellot	00
(Uzbekistan) Mukhriddin Tilovov	11

Third Round
(Japan) Naohisa Takato	01
(South Korea) Jeon Seung-beom	00
(Brazil) Phelipe Pelim	00
(Uzbekistan) Mukhriddin Tilovov	10

Quarterfinals
(Japan) Naohisa Takato	10
(Uzbekistan) Mukhriddin Tilovov	00

=== Pool D ===
First Round
(Ukraine) Artem Lesiuk	00
(Czech Republic) Pavel Petřikov	01
(Croatia) Bernard Azinović	11
(Jordan) Ghaith Salman	00
(Djibouti) Moustapha Hamid	00
(Germany) Moritz Plafky	10
(Mongolia) Dashdavaagiin Amartüvshin	10
(North Korea) Pak Yong-nam	00
(Argentina) Jose Luis Galvan	10
(Cyprus) Christos Skouroumounis	00
(Italy) Elios Manzi	10
(Hungary) Csaba Szabó	00
(Kazakhstan) Gusman Kyrgyzbayev	11
(France) Cedric Revol	00

Second Round
(Spain) Francisco Garrigós	00
(Czech Republic) Pavel Petřikov	10
(Croatia) Bernard Azinović	00
(Germany) Moritz Plafky	03
(Mongolia) Dashdavaagiin Amartüvshin	10
(Argentina) Jose Luis Galvan	00
(Italy) Elios Manzi	00
(Kazakhstan) Gusman Kyrgyzbayev	10

Third Round
(Czech Republic) Pavel Petřikov	10
(Germany) Moritz Plafky	00
(Mongolia) Dashdavaagiin Amartüvshin	00
(Kazakhstan) Gusman Kyrgyzbayev	10

Quarterfinals
(Czech Republic) Pavel Petřikov	10
(Kazakhstan) Gusman Kyrgyzbayev	00

== Prize money ==
The sums listed bring the total prizes awarded to 57,000$ for the individual event.

Medal	Total	Judoka	Coach
Gold	26,000$	20,800$	5,200$
Silver	15,000$	12,000$	3,000$
Bronze	8,000$	6,400$	1,600$
