= 2017 European Judo Championships – Men's 60 kg =

Judo competition

Judo Men's 60 kg at the 2017 European Judo Championships
- Venue: Torwar Hall
- Location: Warsaw, Poland
- Date: April 20, 2017
- Competitors: 25 from 22 nations

Medalists
gold medal	Robert Mshvidobadze (1st title)	Russia
silver medal	Yanislav Gerchev	Bulgaria
bronze medal	Orkhan Safarov	Azerbaijan
bronze medal	Francisco Garrigós	Spain

Competition at external databases
- Links: IJF • JudoInside

The men's 60 kg competition at the 2017 European Judo Championships in Warsaw was held on 20 April at the Torwar Hall.

== Results ==
=== Finals ===
Semi-finals
Robert Mshvidobadze (RUS)	100
Lukhumi Chkhvimiani (GEO)	000
Amiran Papinashvili (GEO)	000
Yanislav Gerchev (BUL)	100

Final
Robert Mshvidobadze (RUS)	000
Yanislav Gerchev (BUL)	000

=== Repechages ===
Repechage		Bronze medal
Orkhan Safarov (AZE)	110
Bekir Ozlu (TUR)	000	Orkhan Safarov (AZE)	110
		Amiran Papinashvili (GEO)	000

Repechage		Bronze medal
Ashley McKenzie (GBR)	000
Francisco Garrigós (ESP)	110	Francisco Garrigós (ESP)	010
		Lukhumi Chkhvimiani (GEO)	000

=== Pool A ===
First round		Second round		Quarterfinals
		Orkhan Safarov (AZE)	140
Matjaz Trbovc (SLO)	010	Matjaz Trbovc (SLO)	000
Moritz Plafky (GER)	000			Orkhan Safarov (AZE)	000
Robert Mshvidobadze (RUS)	100			Robert Mshvidobadze (RUS)	010
Maksim Klimau (BLR)	000	Robert Mshvidobadze (RUS)	110
Vincent Manquest (FRA)	010	Bernard Azinović (CRO)	000
Bernard Azinović (CRO)	100

=== Pool B ===
First round
Borislav Yanakov (BUL)	000
Csaba Szabó (HUN)	010
Daniel Ben David (ISR)	100
Mark Tširkin (EST)	000

Second round
Bekir Ozlu (TUR)	120
Csaba Szabó (HUN)	000
Lukhumi Chkhvimiani (GEO)	110
Daniel Ben David (ISR)	000

Quarterfinals
Bekir Ozlu (TUR)	000
Lukhumi Chkhvimiani (GEO)	020

=== Pool C ===
First round
Cedric Revol (FRA)	100
Hovhannes Davtyan (ARM)	000
Carmine Maria Di Loreto (ITA)	000
Yann Siccardi (MON)	000

Second round
Amiran Papinashvili (GEO)	010
Cedric Revol (FRA)	000
Ashley McKenzie (GBR)	000
Carmine Maria Di Loreto (ITA)	000

Quarterfinals
Amiran Papinashvili (GEO)	101
Ashley McKenzie (GBR)	000

=== Pool D ===
First round
Jorre Verstraeten (BEL)	100
Ákos Bartha (HUN)	000
Ahmet Sahin Kaba (TUR)	120
David Pulkrabek (CZE)	010

Second round
Francisco Garrigós (ESP)	100
Jorre Verstraeten (BEL)	010
Yanislav Gerchev (BUL)	120
Ahmet Sahin Kaba (TUR)	000

Quarterfinals
Francisco Garrigós (ESP)	000
Yanislav Gerchev (BUL)	100
