= Diyorbek Urozboev =

Uzbek judoka (born 1993)

Personal information
- Native name: Diyorbek O'rozboev
- Nationality: Uzbekistan
- Born: 17 August 1993 (age 32) Khorezm, Uzbekistan
- Occupation: Judoka
- Height: 172 cm (5 ft 8 in)

Sport
- Country: Uzbekistan
- Sport: Judo
- Weight class: –60 kg

Achievements and titles
- Olympic Games: (bronze) (2016)
- World Champ.: (bronze) (2017)
- Asian Champ.: (gold) (2018)
Medal record
Men's judo
Representing Uzbekistan
Olympic Games
Bronze medal – third place	2016 Rio de Janeiro	‍–‍60 kg
World Championships
Bronze medal – third place	2017 Budapest	‍–‍60 kg
Asian Games
Gold medal – first place	2018 Jakarta	‍–‍60 kg
Asian Championships
Silver medal – second place	2016 Tashkent	‍–‍60 kg
IJF Grand Slam
Bronze medal – third place	2015 Abu Dhabi	‍–‍60 kg
Bronze medal – third place	2016 Baku	‍–‍60 kg
Bronze medal – third place	2019 Abu Dhabi	‍–‍60 kg
IJF Grand Prix
Gold medal – first place	2016 Tbilisi	‍–‍60 kg
Silver medal – second place	2014 Tashkent	‍–‍60 kg
Silver medal – second place	2018 Tashkent	‍–‍60 kg
Bronze medal – third place	2015 Tbilisi	‍–‍60 kg
Bronze medal – third place	2015 Tashkent	‍–‍60 kg
Bronze medal – third place	2016 Samsun	‍–‍60 kg
Bronze medal – third place	2016 Almaty	‍–‍60 kg
Bronze medal – third place	2019 Tashkent	‍–‍60 kg
World Juniors Championships
Silver medal – second place	2013 Ljubljana	‍–‍60 kg
Asian Junior Championships
Gold medal – first place	2011 Beirut	‍–‍55 kg
Bronze medal – third place	2012 Taipei	‍–‍60 kg
Islamic Solidarity Games
Bronze medal – third place	2017 Baku	‍–‍60 kg

Profile at external databases
- IJF: 9118
- JudoInside.com: 75296
- Updated on 24 May 2023

Diyorbek Urozboev (born 17 August 1993) is an Uzbekistani judoka.

He won a bronze medal at the 2016 Summer Olympics in Rio de Janeiro.

== Biography ==
In 2011, he took third place at the Masters Bremen tournament among participants under the age of 20 (U20) and the European Cup (U20), and won the Asian Championship in Beirut in the same age category. In 2012, he was second in the International Judo Federation Cup in Tashkent, third in the Asian U20 Championship, fifth in the Abu Dhabi Grand Prix and Grand Slam tournaments in Tokyo. In 2013, he was third in the European Cup U21 and silver medalist of the World Championship in the same age category. In 2014, he was second at the Tashkent Grand Prix, and only seventh at the Grand Slam tournament in Baku.

In 2015 he recorded the second place in the Open European Cup in Warsaw, third place at the Grand Prix of Tbilisi, Grand Prix Tashkent, Grand Slam tournament in Abu Dhabi, the fifth place at the Samsun Grand Prix, and the World Masters tournament in Rabat . At the World Cup was the seventh.

In 2016 he won the Grand Prix of Tbilisi, was third at the Samsun Grand Prix, Alma-Ata Grand Prix, Grand Slam tournament in Baku and the seventh at the World Masters tournament in Guadalajara. In the same year he managed to win the title of vice-champion of Asia.

Performed at the Olympic Games in 2016, in the category of up to 60 kilograms, where 35 judoka wrestled. The athletes were divided into 4 groups, of which four judoists reached the semi-finals in the quarterfinals. Losers in the quarter finals met in the "comforting" bouts and then with the injured in the semi-finals, and these results determined the bronze medalists.

In 2021, he competed in the men's 60 kg event at the 2021 Judo World Masters held in Doha, Qatar.
