= Phelipe Pelim =

Brazilian judoka (born 1990)

Personal information
- Born: 5 January 1990 (age 36) Itajaí, Santa Catarina
- Occupation: Judoka

Sport
- Country: Brazil
- Sport: Judo
- Weight class: ‍–‍60 kg

Achievements and titles
- World Champ.: R16 (2017)
Medal record
Men's judo
Representing Brazil
IJF Grand Prix
Silver medal – second place	2017 Cancún	‍–‍60 kg
Bronze medal – third place	2015 Düsseldorf	‍–‍60 kg
Bronze medal – third place	2017 Düsseldorf	‍–‍60 kg
Bronze medal – third place	2017 Tbilisi	‍–‍60 kg
Summer Universiade
Bronze medal – third place	2013 Kazan	Men's team
Bronze medal – third place	2015 Gwangju	‍–‍60 kg

Profile at external databases
- IJF: 2536
- JudoInside.com: 57805
- Updated on 7 December 2022

Phelipe Pelim (born 5 January 1990) is a Brazilian judoka.

Pelim is the silver medalist of the 2017 Judo Grand Prix Cancún in the ‍–‍60 kg category.
