= Mukhriddin Tilovov =

Uzbek judoka (born 1994)

Mukhriddun Tilovov
Personal information
- Born: 1 July 1994 (age 31)
- Occupation: Judoka

Sport
- Country: Uzbekistan
- Sport: Judo
- Weight class: ‍–‍60 kg, ‍–‍66 kg

Achievements and titles
- World Champ.: 5th (2017)
- Asian Champ.: (bronze) (2017, 2022)
Medal record
Men's judo
Representing Uzbekistan
Asian Championships
Bronze medal – third place	2017 Hong Kong	‍–‍60 kg
Bronze medal – third place	2022 Nur‑Sultan	‍–‍66 kg
IJF Grand Slam
Silver medal – second place	2017 Baku	‍–‍60 kg
Silver medal – second place	2023 Abu Dhabi	‍–‍66 kg
Bronze medal – third place	2021 Tel Aviv	‍–‍66 kg
Bronze medal – third place	2023 Tashkent	‍–‍66 kg
Bronze medal – third place	2024 Abu Dhabi	‍–‍66 kg
Bronze medal – third place	2025 Tashkent	‍–‍66 kg
Bronze medal – third place	2025 Astana	‍–‍66 kg
IJF Grand Prix
Gold medal – first place	2016 Tashkent	‍–‍60 kg
Gold medal – first place	2023 Almada	‍–‍66 kg
Bronze medal – third place	2023 Zagreb	‍–‍66 kg

Profile at external databases
- IJF: 32448
- JudoInside.com: 69672
- Updated on 11 May 2025

Mukhriddin Tilolov (born 1 July 1994) is an Uzbekistani judoka.

Tilolov is a bronze medalist from the 2021 Judo Grand Slam Tel Aviv in the ‍–‍66 kg category.
