= 2015 Judo Grand Prix Jeju =

Judo competition

Judo 2015 Judo Grand Prix Jeju
- Location: Jeju City, South Korea
- Dates: 26–28 November 2015
- Competitors: 422 from 70 nations

Competition at external databases
- Links: IJF • EJU • JudoInside

The 2015 Judo Grand Prix Jeju was held in Jeju City, South Korea from 26 to 28 November 2015.

== Medal summary ==
=== Men's events ===
Event	Gold	Silver	Bronze
Extra-lightweight (−60 kg)	Kim Won-jin (KOR)	Ganbatyn Boldbaatar (MGL)	Orkhan Safarov (AZE)
Extra-lightweight (−60 kg)	Kim Won-jin (KOR)	Ganbatyn Boldbaatar (MGL)	Eric Takabatake (BRA)
Half-lightweight (−66 kg)	Mikhail Pulyaev (RUS)	Taroh Fujisaka (JPN)	Tal Flicker (ISR)
Half-lightweight (−66 kg)	Mikhail Pulyaev (RUS)	Taroh Fujisaka (JPN)	Golan Pollack (ISR)
Lightweight (−73 kg)	An Chang-rim (KOR)	Dirk Van Tichelt (BEL)	Musa Mogushkov (RUS)
Lightweight (−73 kg)	An Chang-rim (KOR)	Dirk Van Tichelt (BEL)	Rustam Orujov (AZE)
Half-middleweight (−81 kg)	Seidai Sato (JPN)	Khasan Khalmurzaev (RUS)	Roman Moustopoulos (GRE)
Half-middleweight (−81 kg)	Seidai Sato (JPN)	Khasan Khalmurzaev (RUS)	Lee Sung-ho (KOR)
Middleweight (−90 kg)	Gwak Dong-han (KOR)	Axel Clerget (FRA)	Kirill Denisov (RUS)
Middleweight (−90 kg)	Gwak Dong-han (KOR)	Axel Clerget (FRA)	Ilias Iliadis (GRE)
Half-heavyweight (−100 kg)	Cho Gu-ham (KOR)	José Armenteros (CUB)	Tagir Khaybulaev (RUS)
Half-heavyweight (−100 kg)	Cho Gu-ham (KOR)	José Armenteros (CUB)	Elmar Gasimov (AZE)
Heavyweight (+100 kg)	Teddy Riner (FRA)	Kim Sung-min (KOR)	Andrey Volkov (RUS)
Heavyweight (+100 kg)	Teddy Riner (FRA)	Kim Sung-min (KOR)	Roy Meyer (NED)

=== Women's events ===
Event	Gold	Silver	Bronze
Extra-lightweight (−48 kg)	Otgontsetseg Galbadrakh (KAZ)	Éva Csernoviczki (HUN)	Jeong Bo-kyeong (KOR)
Extra-lightweight (−48 kg)	Otgontsetseg Galbadrakh (KAZ)	Éva Csernoviczki (HUN)	Dilara Lokmanhekim (TUR)
Half-lightweight (−52 kg)	Andreea Chițu (ROU)	Mako Uchio (JPN)	Priscilla Gneto (FRA)
Half-lightweight (−52 kg)	Andreea Chițu (ROU)	Mako Uchio (JPN)	Roni Schwartz (ISR)
Lightweight (−57 kg)	Kim Jan-di (KOR)	Nekoda Smythe-Davis (GBR)	Viola Wächter (GER)
Lightweight (−57 kg)	Kim Jan-di (KOR)	Nekoda Smythe-Davis (GBR)	Lien Chen-ling (TPE)
Half-middleweight (−63 kg)	Clarisse Agbegnenou (FRA)	Edwige Gwend (ITA)	Alice Schlesinger (GBR)
Half-middleweight (−63 kg)	Clarisse Agbegnenou (FRA)	Edwige Gwend (ITA)	Tsend-Ayuushiin Tserennadmid (MGL)
Middleweight (−70 kg)	Sally Conway (GBR)	Kim Seong-yeon (KOR)	Laura Vargas Koch (GER)
Middleweight (−70 kg)	Sally Conway (GBR)	Kim Seong-yeon (KOR)	Barbara Matić (CRO)
Half-heavyweight (−78 kg)	Audrey Tcheuméo (FRA)	Kayla Harrison (USA)	Rika Takayama (JPN)
Half-heavyweight (−78 kg)	Audrey Tcheuméo (FRA)	Kayla Harrison (USA)	Gemma Gibbons (GBR)
Heavyweight (+78 kg)	Sarah Asahina (JPN)	Belkıs Zehra Kaya (TUR)	Kim Min-jeong (KOR)
Heavyweight (+78 kg)	Sarah Asahina (JPN)	Belkıs Zehra Kaya (TUR)	Iryna Kindzerska (UKR)

Source Results

=== Medal table ===
* Host nation (South Korea)

Rank	Nation	Gold	Silver	Bronze	Total
1	South Korea (KOR)*	5	2	3	10
2	France (FRA)	3	1	1	5
3	Japan (JPN)	2	2	1	5
4	Russia (RUS)	1	1	4	6
5	Great Britain (GBR)	1	1	2	4
6	Kazakhstan (KAZ)	1	0	0	1
6	Romania (ROU)	1	0	0	1
8	Mongolia (MGL)	0	1	1	2
8	Turkey (TUR)	0	1	1	2
10	Belgium (BEL)	0	1	0	1
10	Cuba (CUB)	0	1	0	1
10	Hungary (HUN)	0	1	0	1
10	Italy (ITA)	0	1	0	1
10	United States (USA)	0	1	0	1
15	Azerbaijan (AZE)	0	0	3	3
15	Israel (ISR)	0	0	3	3
17	Germany (GER)	0	0	2	2
17	Greece (GRE)	0	0	2	2
19	Brazil (BRA)	0	0	1	1
19	Chinese Taipei (TPE)	0	0	1	1
19	Croatia (CRO)	0	0	1	1
19	Netherlands (NED)	0	0	1	1
19	Ukraine (UKR)	0	0	1	1
Totals (23 entries)		14	14	28	56
