= 2018 Judo Grand Prix Agadir =

Judo competition

Judo 2018 Judo Grand Prix Agadir
- Venue: Sports Hall Al Inbiaat
- Location: Agadir, Morocco
- Dates: 9–11 March 2018
- Competitors: 241 from 38 nations

Competition at external databases
- Links: IJF • EJU • JudoInside

The 2018 Judo Grand Prix Agadir was held at Sports Hall Al Inbiaat in Agadir, Morocco, from 9 to 11 March 2018.

== Medal summary ==
=== Men's events ===
| Event | Gold | Silver | Bronze |
|---|---|---|---|
| Extra-lightweight (−60 kg) | Gusman Kyrgyzbayev (KAZ) | Bekir Özlü (TUR) | Gonçalo Mansinho (POR) |
| Extra-lightweight (−60 kg) | Gusman Kyrgyzbayev (KAZ) | Bekir Özlü (TUR) | Issam Bassou (MAR) |
| Half-lightweight (−66 kg) | Adrian Gomboc (SLO) | Yerlan Serikzhanov (KAZ) | Daniel Jean (FRA) |
| Half-lightweight (−66 kg) | Adrian Gomboc (SLO) | Yerlan Serikzhanov (KAZ) | Andraž Jereb (SLO) |
| Lightweight (−73 kg) | Bilal Çiloğlu (TUR) | Musa Mogushkov (RUS) | Bekadil Shaimerdenov (KAZ) |
| Lightweight (−73 kg) | Bilal Çiloğlu (TUR) | Musa Mogushkov (RUS) | Anthony Zingg (GER) |
| Half-middleweight (−81 kg) | Vedat Albayrak (TUR) | Matthias Casse (BEL) | Anri Egutidze (POR) |
| Half-middleweight (−81 kg) | Vedat Albayrak (TUR) | Matthias Casse (BEL) | Khasan Khalmurzaev (RUS) |
| Middleweight (−90 kg) | Khusen Khalmurzaev (RUS) | Ciril Grossklaus (SUI) | Joachim Bottieau (BEL) |
| Middleweight (−90 kg) | Khusen Khalmurzaev (RUS) | Ciril Grossklaus (SUI) | Quedjau Nhabali (UKR) |
| Half-heavyweight (−100 kg) | Kirill Denisov (RUS) | Jorge Fonseca (POR) | Batyr Hojamuhammedov (TKM) |
| Half-heavyweight (−100 kg) | Kirill Denisov (RUS) | Jorge Fonseca (POR) | Karl-Richard Frey (GER) |
| Heavyweight (+100 kg) | Johannes Frey (GER) | Anton Krivobokov (RUS) | Oleksandr Gordiienko (UKR) |
| Heavyweight (+100 kg) | Johannes Frey (GER) | Anton Krivobokov (RUS) | Nabil Zalagh (FRA) |

=== Women's events ===
| Event | Gold | Silver | Bronze |
|---|---|---|---|
| Extra-lightweight (−48 kg) | Irina Dolgova (RUS) | Catarina Costa (POR) | Maruša Štangar (SLO) |
| Extra-lightweight (−48 kg) | Irina Dolgova (RUS) | Catarina Costa (POR) | Julia Figueroa (ESP) |
| Half-lightweight (−52 kg) | Evelyne Tschopp (SUI) | Alexandra-Larisa Florian (ROU) | Gefen Primo (ISR) |
| Half-lightweight (−52 kg) | Evelyne Tschopp (SUI) | Alexandra-Larisa Florian (ROU) | Gülbadam Babamuratowa (TKM) |
| Lightweight (−57 kg) | Timna Nelson-Levy (ISR) | Kaja Kajzer (SLO) | Miryam Roper (PAN) |
| Lightweight (−57 kg) | Timna Nelson-Levy (ISR) | Kaja Kajzer (SLO) | Sarah Harachi (FRA) |
| Half-middleweight (−63 kg) | Andreja Leški (SLO) | Katharina Haecker (AUS) | Yasmine Horlaville (FRA) |
| Half-middleweight (−63 kg) | Andreja Leški (SLO) | Katharina Haecker (AUS) | Inbal Shemesh (ISR) |
| Middleweight (−70 kg) | Assmaa Niang (MAR) | María Pérez (PUR) | Anka Pogačnik (SLO) |
| Middleweight (−70 kg) | Assmaa Niang (MAR) | María Pérez (PUR) | Szaundra Diedrich (GER) |
| Half-heavyweight (−78 kg) | Maike Ziech (GER) | Anastasiya Turchyn (UKR) | Yarden Mayersohn (ISR) |
| Half-heavyweight (−78 kg) | Maike Ziech (GER) | Anastasiya Turchyn (UKR) | Anastasiya Dmitrieva (RUS) |
| Heavyweight (+78 kg) | Yelyzaveta Kalanina (UKR) | Anamari Velenšek (SLO) | Anna Gushchina (RUS) |
| Heavyweight (+78 kg) | Yelyzaveta Kalanina (UKR) | Anamari Velenšek (SLO) | Ivana Šutalo (CRO) |

Source Results

=== Medal table ===
* Host nation (Morocco)

| Rank | Nation | Gold | Silver | Bronze | Total |
|---|---|---|---|---|---|
| 1 | Russia (RUS) | 3 | 2 | 3 | 8 |
| 2 | Slovenia (SLO) | 2 | 2 | 3 | 7 |
| 3 | Turkey (TUR) | 2 | 1 | 0 | 3 |
| 4 | Germany (GER) | 2 | 0 | 3 | 5 |
| 5 | Ukraine (UKR) | 1 | 1 | 2 | 4 |
| 6 | Kazakhstan (KAZ) | 1 | 1 | 1 | 3 |
| 7 | Switzerland (SUI) | 1 | 1 | 0 | 2 |
| 8 | Israel (ISR) | 1 | 0 | 3 | 4 |
| 9 | Morocco (MAR)* | 1 | 0 | 1 | 2 |
| 10 | Portugal (POR) | 0 | 2 | 2 | 4 |
| 11 | Belgium (BEL) | 0 | 1 | 1 | 2 |
| 12 | Australia (AUS) | 0 | 1 | 0 | 1 |
| 12 | Puerto Rico (PUR) | 0 | 1 | 0 | 1 |
| 12 | Romania (ROU) | 0 | 1 | 0 | 1 |
| 15 | France (FRA) | 0 | 0 | 4 | 4 |
| 16 | Turkmenistan (TKM) | 0 | 0 | 2 | 2 |
| 17 | Croatia (CRO) | 0 | 0 | 1 | 1 |
| 17 | Panama (PAN) | 0 | 0 | 1 | 1 |
| 17 | Spain (ESP) | 0 | 0 | 1 | 1 |
| Totals (19 entries) | | 14 | 14 | 28 | 56 |
