= Bagrati Niniashvili =

Georgian judoka (born 1998)

Personal information
- Native name: ბაგრატი ნინიაშვილი
- Nationality: Georgia
- Born: 1 October 1998 (age 27)
- Occupation: Judoka
- Height: 168 cm (5 ft 6 in)

Sport
- Country: Georgia
- Sport: Judo
- Weight class: –66 kg

Achievements and titles
- World Champ.: R32 (2019)
- European Champ.: (bronze) (2019)
Medal record
Men's judo
Representing Georgia
European Games
Bronze medal – third place	2019 Minsk	–66 kg
IJF Grand Slam
Bronze medal – third place	2019 Ekaterinburg	–66 kg
IJF Grand Prix
Gold medal – first place	2018 Antalya	–66 kg
Bronze medal – third place	2019 Tbilisi	–66 kg
Bronze medal – third place	2019 Antalya	–66 kg
European U23 Championships
Bronze medal – third place	2020 Poreč	–66 kg
World Juniors Championships
Bronze medal – third place	2017 Zagreb	–66 kg
European Junior Championships
Bronze medal – third place	2018 Sofia	–66 kg
World Cadets Championships
Silver medal – second place	2015 Sarajevo	–66 kg
European Cadet Championships
Bronze medal – third place	2015 Sofia	–66 kg

Profile at external databases
- IJF: 20526
- JudoInside.com: 36133
- Updated on 10 November 2022

Bagrati Niniashvili (born 1 October 1998) is a Georgian judoka.

He is the bronze medallist of the 2019 European Games in the -66 kg category.
