= Islam Yashuev =

Russian judoka (born 1993)

Personal information
- Born: 23 January 1993 (age 33)
- Occupation: Judoka

Sport
- Country: Russia
- Sport: Judo
- Weight class: ‍–‍60 kg

Achievements and titles
- European Champ.: (gold) (2018)
Medal record
Men's judo
Representing Russia
European Championships
Gold medal – first place	2018 Tel Aviv	‍–‍60 kg
IJF Grand Slam
Silver medal – second place	2018 Ekaterinburg	‍–‍60 kg
Bronze medal – third place	2019 Brasilia	‍–‍60 kg
IJF Grand Prix
Silver medal – second place	2016 Qingdao	‍–‍60 kg
Silver medal – second place	2017 Tashkent	‍–‍60 kg
Bronze medal – third place	2017 Tbilisi	‍–‍60 kg
European U23 Championships
Gold medal – first place	2014 Wrocław	‍–‍60 kg
Gold medal – first place	2015 Bratislava	‍–‍60 kg

Profile at external databases
- IJF: 17358
- JudoInside.com: 65372
- Updated on 11 November 2022

Islam Khuseinovich Yashuev (Russian: Исла́м Хусе́йнович Яшу́ев; born 23 January 1993) is a Russian judoka. He competes in the ‍–‍60 kg weight category and won a gold medal in the 2018 European Championships.
