= Yarden Mayersohn =

Israeli judoka (born 1993)

Personal information
- Native name: ירדן מאירסון
- Born: 21 June 1993 (age 33)
- Occupation: Judoka

Sport
- Country: Israel
- Sport: Judo
- Weight class: ‍–‍70 kg, ‍–‍78 kg

Achievements and titles
- World Champ.: R32 (2017)
- European Champ.: R16 (2017, 2018)
Medal record
Women's judo
Representing Israel
IJF Grand Prix
Silver medal – second place	2017 Antalya	‍–‍78 kg
Bronze medal – third place	2017 Tashkent	‍–‍78 kg
Bronze medal – third place	2018 Agadir	‍–‍78 kg

Profile at external databases
- IJF: 14860
- JudoInside.com: 57550
- Updated on 5 December 2022

Yarden Mayersohn (Hebrew: ירדן מאירסון; born 21 June 1993) is an Israeli judoka.

Mayersohn is a bronze medalist from the 2018 Judo Grand Prix Agadir in the ‍–‍78 kg category.
