= Tal Flicker =

Israeli judoka (born 1992)

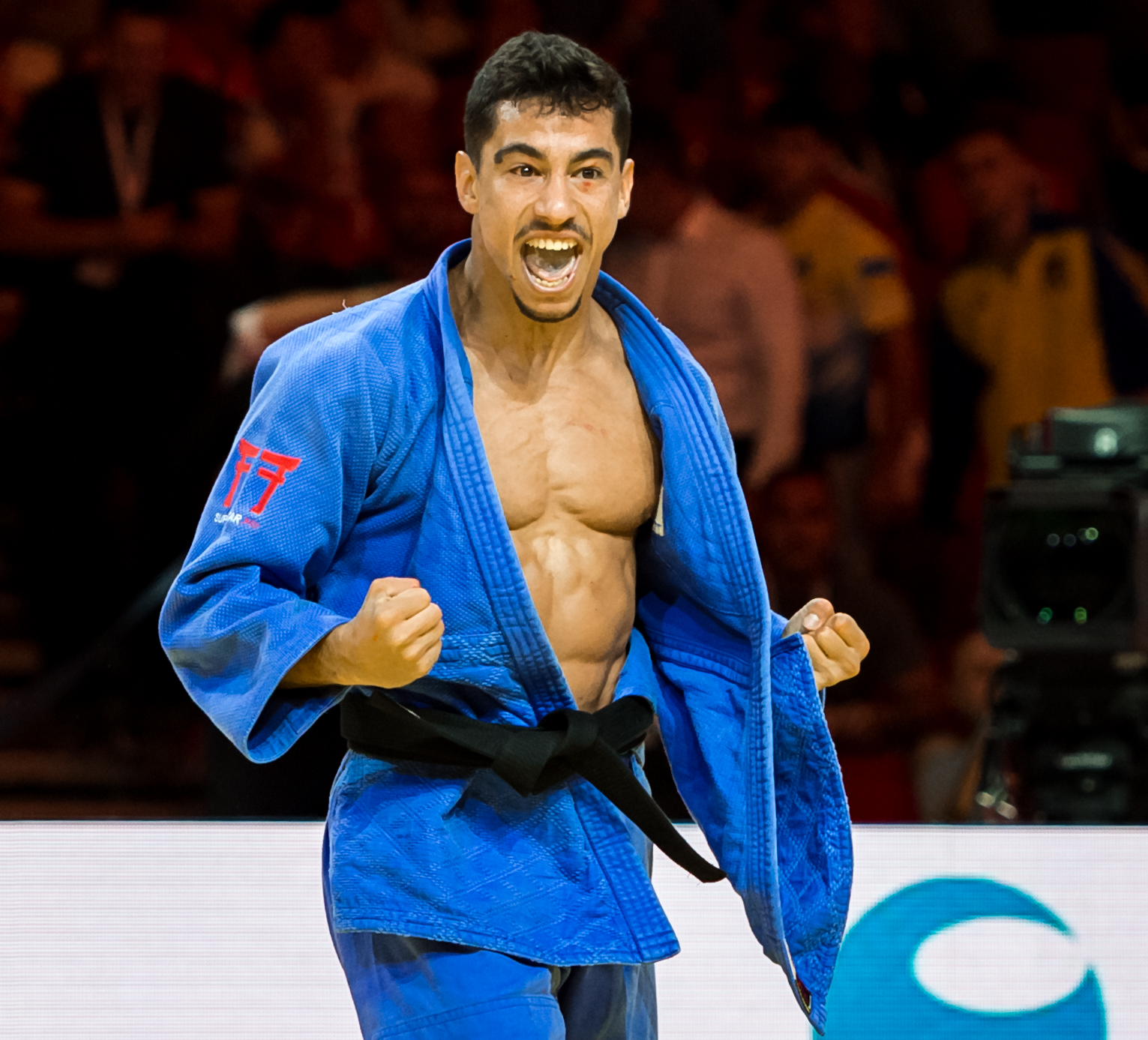
- Flicker in 2017

Personal information
- Native name: טל פליקר
- Born: 28 May 1992 (age 34) Herzliya, Israel
- Occupation: Judoka
- Height: 170 cm (5 ft 7 in)

Sport
- Country: Israel
- Sport: Judo
- Weight class: –66 kg
- Rank: 6th dan black belt
- Coached by: Shuki Koaz
- Retired: 3 April 2025

Achievements and titles
- World Champ.: (bronze) (2017)
- European Champ.: (silver) (2020)
- Highest world ranking: 1 (2017)
Medal record
Men's judo
Representing Israel
World Championships
Bronze medal – third place	2017 Budapest	‍–‍66 kg
Bronze medal – third place	2022 Tashkent	Mixed team
European Championships
Silver medal – second place	2020 Prague	‍–‍66 kg
Bronze medal – third place	2018 Tel Aviv	‍–‍66 kg
IJF Grand Slam
Gold medal – first place	2017 Baku	‍–‍66 kg
Gold medal – first place	2017 Abu Dhabi	‍–‍66 kg
Bronze medal – third place	2022 Antalya	‍–‍66 kg
Bronze medal – third place	2022 Budapest	‍–‍66 kg
IJF Grand Prix
Gold medal – first place	2017 Cancún	‍–‍66 kg
Gold medal – first place	2018 Zagreb	‍–‍66 kg
Gold medal – first place	2019 Tbilisi	‍–‍66 kg
Bronze medal – third place	2014 Zagreb	‍–‍66 kg
Bronze medal – third place	2015 Jeju	‍–‍66 kg
Bronze medal – third place	2016 Zagreb	‍–‍66 kg
Bronze medal – third place	2017 Düsseldorf	‍–‍66 kg
Bronze medal – third place	2020 Tel Aviv	‍–‍66 kg

Profile at external databases
- IJF: 3872
- JudoInside.com: 58708
- Updated on 4 May 2025

Tal Flicker (Hebrew: טל פליקר; born 28 May 1992) is an Israeli retired judoka. He competed in the under 66 kg weight category, and won bronze medals in the 2017 World Championships and the 2018 European Championships as well as a silver medal in the 2020 European Championships. Flicker won the 2017 Baku Grand Slam, the 2017 Cancún Grand Prix and the 2017 Abu Dhabi Grand Slam. In August 2017 he was ranked # 1 in the world in the 66 kg division.

== Judo career ==
=== 2011-16 ===
In 2011, Flicker won the gold medal at the European Cup Under-20 in Paks, Hungary. He has won Israeli championships in 2011, 2012, 2014, and 2015.

On 1 June 2013, Flicker won his first international contest as a senior after defeating Ivan Spirin from Russia in the final of the European Open Bucharest. On 12 September, he won a bronze medal in 2014 Zagreb Grand Prix, his first medal in a Grand Prix. In 2015 he won the European Open in Rome, and won bronze at the 2015 Jeju Grand Prix, South Korea. He then won bronze at the 2016 Zagreb Grand Prix.

=== 2017-present ===
On 10 March, Flicker won the gold medal at the 2017 Baku Grand Slam, after defeating Tomofumi Takajo from Japan in the final, and won another gold medal at the 2017 Cancún Grand Prix three months later. In 2017 he also won the European Open in Lisbon, and won bronze at the 2017 Düsseldorf Grand Prix.

On 29 August, Flicker won a bronze medal at the 2017 World Championships in men's 66 kg in Budapest, Hungary. Flicker reached the semi-final where he lost to Mikhail Pulyaev of Russia, and then in the bronze medal contest he beat European champion Georgii Zantaraia of Ukraine by waza-ari. He followed in the footsteps of fellow Israeli Golan Pollack, who won a World Championships bronze medal in the U66 category as well, two years prior. He became the fourth Israeli man in history to win the bronze, the others being Oren Smadja, his trainer, and Arik Zeevi, who won in the open-weight category. In August 2017 he was ranked # 1 in the world in the U66 kg division.

On 26 October, Flicker won a gold medal at 2017 Abu Dhabi Grand Slam in the United Arab Emirates after defeating world championships bronze medalist Nijat Shikhalizada of Azerbaijan with ippon. The International Judo Federation (IJF) had sent a letter to the President of the United Arab Emirates Judo Federation that instructed: "all delegations, including the Israeli delegation, shall be treated absolutely equally in all aspects, without any exception," and that the IJF statutes "clearly provide that the IJF shall not discriminate on the ground of race, religion, gender or political opinion."

However, despite Ficker's win, and against the explicit instructions of the International Judo Federation, as they had done in the same event two years prior, tournament organizers in Abu Dhabi refused to fly the Israeli flag or play the Israeli national anthem, despite the fact that it is customary to play the medalist's national anthem. In addition, instead of having "ISR" by his name on the scoreboard and on his back to denote that he was competing for Israel, at the insistence of the organizers "IJF" (for the International Judo Federation) was substituted. Oren Smadja said, after Flicker's victory: "I am very happy to be here - with a flag, without a flag ... to prove to everyone that it is impossible to stop the State of Israel." Arab and Muslim nations and athletes often boycott, or refuse to shake hands with, Israeli competitors.

On 26 April, Flicker took part in the 2018 European Championships in Tel Aviv and won a bronze medal in the under 66 kg weight category. In the first round he defeated Nathon Burns of Ireland by waza-ari, in the second round he defeated Vadim Bunescu of Moldova by ippon. In the quarter-finals he lost to Adrian Gomboc of Slovenia. He went on to defeat João Crisóstomo of Portugal in the repechage and reached the bronze medal match where he defeated Marko Gusic of Montenegro by ippon.

Flicker announced his retirement from competitive judo in April 2025.

== Titles ==
Year	Tournament	Place	Ref.
2014	Grand Prix Zagreb	3rd place, bronze medalist(s)	
2015	Grand Prix Jeju	3rd place, bronze medalist(s)	
2016	Grand Prix Zagreb	3rd place, bronze medalist(s)	
2017	Grand Prix Düsseldorf	3rd place, bronze medalist(s)	
2017	Grand Slam Baku	1st place, gold medalist(s)	
2017	Grand Prix Cancún	1st place, gold medalist(s)	
2017	World Championships	3rd place, bronze medalist(s)	
2017	Grand Slam Abu Dhabi	1st place, gold medalist(s)	
2018	European Championships	3rd place, bronze medalist(s)	
2018	Grand Prix Zagreb	1st place, gold medalist(s)	
2019	Grand Prix Tbilisi	1st place, gold medalist(s)	
2020	Grand Prix Tel Aviv	3rd place, bronze medalist(s)	
2020	European Championships	2nd place, silver medalist(s)	
2022	Grand Slam Antalya	3rd place, bronze medalist(s)	
2022	Grand Slam Budapest	3rd place, bronze medalist(s)	

== See also ==
- Arash Miresmaeili Controversy
- Islam El Shehaby Controversy
