= Yakub Shamilov =

Russian judoka (born 1991)

Personal information
- Full name: Yakub Dzhambekovich Shamilov
- Born: 25 April 1991 (age 35) Argun, Checheno-Ingush ASSR, RSFSR, USSR (now Russia)
- Occupation: Judoka

Sport
- Country: Russia
- Sport: Judo
- Weight class: ‍–‍66 kg

Achievements and titles
- Olympic Games: R16 (2020)
- World Champ.: (bronze) (2021)
- European Champ.: R32 (2018, 2019)
Medal record
Men's judo
Representing the Russian Judo Federation
World Championships
| Bronze medal – third place | 2021 Budapest | ‍–‍66 kg |
Representing Russia
IJF Grand Slam
| Gold medal – first place | 2016 Abu Dhabi | ‍–‍66 kg |
| Silver medal – second place | 2018 Ekaterinburg | ‍–‍66 kg |
| Silver medal – second place | 2020 Budapest | ‍–‍66 kg |
| Bronze medal – third place | 2015 Tyumen | ‍–‍66 kg |
| Bronze medal – third place | 2016 Tyumen | ‍–‍66 kg |
| Bronze medal – third place | 2019 Düsseldorf | ‍–‍66 kg |
| Bronze medal – third place | 2020 Düsseldorf | ‍–‍66 kg |
| Bronze medal – third place | 2021 Kazan | ‍–‍66 kg |
IJF Grand Prix
| Gold medal – first place | 2014 Qingdao | ‍–‍66 kg |
| Gold medal – first place | 2017 Hohhot | ‍–‍66 kg |
| Gold medal – first place | 2019 Tashkent | ‍–‍66 kg |
| Silver medal – second place | 2013 Miami | ‍–‍66 kg |
| Silver medal – second place | 2017 The Hague | ‍–‍66 kg |
| Bronze medal – third place | 2013 Almaty | ‍–‍66 kg |
| Bronze medal – third place | 2017 Tbilisi | ‍–‍66 kg |
European U23 Championships
| Bronze medal – third place | 2013 Samokov | ‍–‍66 kg |
World Juniors Championships
| Bronze medal – third place | 2010 Agadir | ‍–‍60 kg |
European Junior Championships
| Gold medal – first place | 2010 Samokov | ‍–‍60 kg |
Summer Universiade
| Bronze medal – third place | 2013 Kazan | ‍–‍66 kg |

Profile at external databases
- IJF: 3803
- JudoInside.com: 58875
- Updated on 23 May 2023

Yakub Dzhambekovich Shamilov (Russian: Якуб Джамбекович Шамилов; born 25 April 1991 in Argun, Chechnya) is a Russian judoka of Chechen nationality.

Shamilov is the 2016 Abu Dhabi champion
