= Daniel Jean (judoka) =

French judoka (born 1997)

Personal information
- Nationality: French
- Born: 21 January 1997 (age 29)
- Occupation: Judoka

Sport
- Country: France
- Sport: Judo
- Weight class: –66 kg

Achievements and titles
- World Champ.: R64 (2018)
- European Champ.: R32 (2018)
Medal record
Men's judo
Representing France
IJF Grand Prix
Bronze medal – third place	2018 Agadir	–66 kg
Bronze medal – third place	2018 Tbilisi	–66 kg
European Cadet Championships
Bronze medal – third place	2014 Athens	–66 kg

Profile at external databases
- IJF: 22654
- JudoInside.com: 83058
- Updated on 1 December 2022

Daniel Jean (born 21 January 1997) is a French judoka.

He is the bronze medallist of the 2018 Judo Grand Prix Tbilisi in the -66 kg category.
