= Matjaž Trbovc =

Slovenian judoka (born 1989)

Personal information
- Born: 11 September 1989 (age 36)
- Occupation: Judoka

Sport
- Country: Slovenia
- Sport: Judo
- Weight class: ‍–‍60 kg

Achievements and titles
- World Champ.: R64 (2017, 2018)
- European Champ.: R16 (2010, 2014, 2015, 2017)
Medal record
Men's judo
Representing Slovenia
IJF Grand Prix
Silver medal – second place	2016 Tashkent	‍–‍60 kg
Silver medal – second place	2018 Tunis	‍–‍60 kg

Profile at external databases
- IJF: 2296
- JudoInside.com: 40709
- Updated on 5 December 2022

Matjaž Trbovc (born 11 September 1989) is a Slovenia judoka.

Trbovc is the silver medalist of the 2018 Judo Grand Prix Tunis in the ‍–‍60 kg category.
