= Kim Lim-hwan =

South Korean judoka

Personal information
- Nationality: South Korea
- Born: 6 May 1992 (age 34)
- Occupation: Judoka

Sport
- Country: South Korea
- Sport: Judo
- Weight class: –66 kg

Achievements and titles
- World Champ.: (silver) (2019)
- Asian Champ.: (bronze) (2021)
Medal record
Men's judo
Representing South Korea
World Championships
Silver medal – second place	2019 Tokyo	‍–‍66 kg
Asian Championships
Bronze medal – third place	2021 Bishkek	‍–‍66 kg
IJF Grand Slam
Silver medal – second place	2019 Düsseldorf	‍–‍66 kg
Silver medal – second place	2020 Paris	‍–‍66 kg
Bronze medal – third place	2014 Baku	‍–‍66 kg
IJF Grand Prix
Gold medal – first place	2016 Samsun	‍–‍66 kg
Gold medal – first place	2019 Hohhot	‍–‍66 kg
Bronze medal – third place	2015 Qingdao	‍–‍66 kg

Profile at external databases
- IJF: 15981
- JudoInside.com: 51530
- Updated on 23 May 2023

Kim Lim-hwan (born 6 May 1992) is a South Korean judoka.

He won a medal at the 2019 World Judo Championships. In 2021, he won one of the bronze medals in his event at the 2021 Asian-Pacific Judo Championships held in Bishkek, Kyrgyzstan.
