= Orkhan Safarov =

Azerbaijani judoka (born 1991)

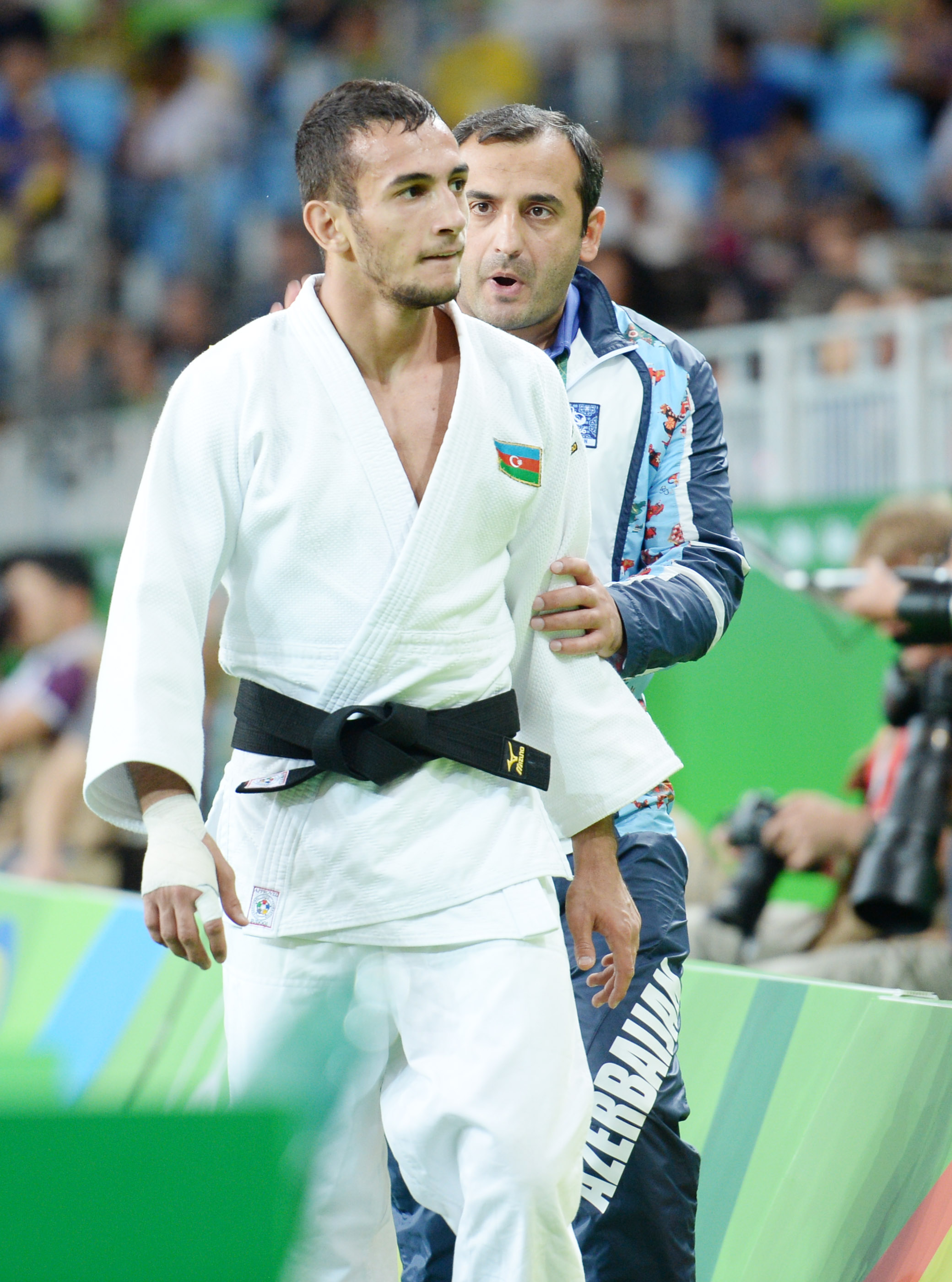
- Safarov at the 2016 Summer Olympics

Personal information
- Nationality: Azerbaijani
- Born: 10 August 1991 (age 34)
- Occupation: Judoka

Sport
- Country: Azerbaijan
- Sport: Judo
- Weight class: –60 kg, –66 kg

Achievements and titles
- Olympic Games: 5th (2016)
- World Champ.: (silver) (2017)
- European Champ.: (gold) (2020)
Medal record
Men's judo
Representing Azerbaijan
World Championships
Silver medal – second place	2017 Budapest	‍–‍60 kg
Bronze medal – third place	2013 Rio de Janeiro	‍–‍60 kg
European Games
Silver medal – second place	2015 Baku	‍–‍60 kg
European Championships
Gold medal – first place	2020 Prague	‍–‍66 kg
Silver medal – second place	2016 Kazan	‍–‍60 kg
Bronze medal – third place	2017 Warsaw	‍–‍60 kg
World Masters
Gold medal – first place	2016 Guadalajara	‍–‍60 kg
Silver medal – second place	2015 Rabat	‍–‍60 kg
IJF Grand Slam
Gold medal – first place	2014 Baku	‍–‍60 kg
Gold medal – first place	2014 Abu Dhabi	‍–‍60 kg
Gold medal – first place	2021 Baku	‍–‍66 kg
Silver medal – second place	2019 Abu Dhabi	‍–‍66 kg
Silver medal – second place	2023 Tel Aviv	‍–‍66 kg
Bronze medal – third place	2017 Paris	‍–‍60 kg
Bronze medal – third place	2017 Baku	‍–‍60 kg
Bronze medal – third place	2020 Budapest	‍–‍66 kg
Bronze medal – third place	2022 Baku	‍–‍66 kg
IJF Grand Prix
Gold medal – first place	2014 Tbilisi	‍–‍60 kg
Silver medal – second place	2015 Samsun	‍–‍60 kg
Bronze medal – third place	2012 Baku	‍–‍60 kg
Bronze medal – third place	2013 Abu Dhabi	‍–‍60 kg
Bronze medal – third place	2015 Jeju	‍–‍60 kg
Bronze medal – third place	2016 Havana	‍–‍60 kg
European U23 Championships
Bronze medal – third place	2012 Prague	‍–‍60 kg
Islamic Solidarity Games
Gold medal – first place	2017 Baku	‍–‍60 kg
Gold medal – first place	2017 Baku	Men's team

Profile at external databases
- IJF: 9194
- JudoInside.com: 57453
- Updated on 26 June 2023

Orkhan Safarov (born 10 August 1991) is an Azerbaijani judoka. He won a bronze at the 2013 World Judo Championships in the ‍–‍60 kg category.

In 2021, Safarov competed in the men's 66 kg event at the 2021 Judo World Masters held in Doha, Qatar.

== Early and personal life ==
Orkhan Safarov was born on 11 August 1991. Safarov achieved his first success in judo in 2009, winning a silver medal at the Azerbaijan Youth Championship. In total, Safarov has won 4 gold, 2 silver and 4 bronze medals at the World Masters and Grand Prix during his judo career. His personal coach is Farhad Mammadov.

== Career ==
=== 2013 World Cup ===
In 2013, Orkhan Safarov achieved his first serious success. At the World Championships in Rio de Janeiro, Brazil, he defeated Beslan Mudranov of Russia, Nicolas Kossora of the United States and Tommy Arshansky of Israel to advance to the quarterfinals. Orkhan Safarov lost to the South Korean judoka at this stage. Despite this defeat, he managed to win a medal. Orkhan Safarov defeated Yeldos Smetov of Kazakhstan and Amiran Papinashvili of Georgia and was awarded a bronze medal.

==== I European Games ====
Orkhan Safarov achieved another great success at the 2015 European Games. He defeated judokas from Belarus, Switzerland and Spain before the final. In the final, Orkhan Safarov faced a Russian judoka. Orkhan Safarov, who was injured in front of a strong opponent, left the tatami defeated and won a silver medal at the first European Games. After that success, he was awarded the Medal of Progress. After the first European Games, Orkhan Safarov participated in the next serious competition at the XXXI Summer Olympic Games in 2016.

===== Rio de Janeiro Olympics =====
Orkhan Safarov joined the fight at the Rio de Janeiro Olympics on August 6. He easily defeated 27-year-old Peruvian Juan Postigos in the 1/16 finals to advance to the next round. At this stage, Orkhan Safarov faced the representative of Kyrgyzstan Otar Bestayev and won decisively. At the beginning of the match, despite having two shido penalty points, he won with a great ippon trick 16 seconds before the end and qualified for the next round. Stepping towards the final with confidence, Orkhan Safarov faced a strong Brazilian judoka, London Olympics bronze medalist Felipe Kitadai in the quarterfinals. He defeated his strong opponent with a magnificent ippon trick 2 minutes and 6 seconds before the end of a tense match and reached the semifinals. His opponent at this stage was the title of Kazakhstani judoka, world champion Yeldos Smetov. Despite Orkhan Safarov's good fight, 20 seconds before the end, Yeldos Smetov took the lead with a strong trick and a va-zari score. In the last 15 seconds, Yeldos Smetov extended the time to get rid of Orkhan Safarov's pressure. The judge's award of three shido penalty points to the Kazakh judoka did not change anything, and Orkhan Safarov lost and continued the fight for the bronze medal. In the match for the bronze medal, Orkhan Safarov faced the Japanese judoka, 2013 World Champion Naohisa Takato. Although no score was recorded in the match, the Japanese judoka won because Orkhan Safarov had two shido penalty points. However, at the end of the match, Orkhan Safarov faced the bias of the referee. Despite his trick, the Mexican referee did not evaluate the trick, and Orkhan Safarov lost and finished the XXX Summer Olympic Games in 5th place.
