= Matteo Medves =

Italian judoka (born 1994)

Personal information
- Born: 20 June 1994 (age 32) Monfalcone, Italy
- Occupation: Judoka
- Height: 175 cm (5 ft 9 in)

Sport
- Country: Italy
- Sport: Judo
- Weight class: ‍–‍66 kg

Achievements and titles
- World Champ.: R16 (2019)
- European Champ.: (silver) (2018, 2019)
Medal record
Men's judo
Representing Italy
European Games
Silver medal – second place	2019 Minsk	‍–‍66 kg
European Championships
Silver medal – second place	2018 Tel Aviv	‍–‍66 kg
IJF Grand Prix
Bronze medal – third place	2017 Zagreb	‍–‍66 kg

Profile at external databases
- IJF: 18660
- JudoInside.com: 65607
- Updated on 10 November 2022

Matteo Medves (born 20 June 1994) is an Italian judoka.

He competes in the ‍–‍66 kg weight category and won a silver medal in his weight division at the 2018 European Judo Championships
