= Dzmitry Shershan =

Belarusian judoka (born 1988)

Personal information
- Born: 28 December 1988 (age 37)
- Occupation: Judoka

Sport
- Country: Belarus
- Sport: Judo
- Weight class: ‍–‍66 kg

Achievements and titles
- Olympic Games: R32 (2016)
- World Champ.: R16 (2014, 2018)
- European Champ.: (bronze) (2014, 2018)
Medal record
Men's judo
Representing Belarus
European Championships
Bronze medal – third place	2014 Montpellier	‍–‍66 kg
Bronze medal – third place	2018 Tel Aviv	‍–‍66 kg
World Masters
Silver medal – second place	2015 Rabat	‍–‍66 kg
IJF Grand Slam
Gold medal – first place	2014 Abu Dhabi	‍–‍66 kg
Bronze medal – third place	2018 Abu Dhabi	‍–‍66 kg
IJF Grand Prix
Silver medal – second place	2013 Almaty	‍–‍66 kg
Silver medal – second place	2014 Budapest	‍–‍66 kg
Bronze medal – third place	2015 Tashkent	‍–‍66 kg
European U23 Championships
Bronze medal – third place	2009 Antalya	‍–‍66 kg

Profile at external databases
- IJF: 4223
- JudoInside.com: 33766
- Updated on 11 November 2022

Dzmitry Shershan (born 28 December 1988) is a Belarusian judoka. He competed at the 2016 Summer Olympics in the men's 66 kg event, in which he was eliminated in the second round by Rishod Sobirov.
