= 2018 European Judo Championships =

2018 Judo European Judo Championships
- Venue: Expo Tel Aviv
- Location: Tel Aviv, Israel
- Dates: 26–28 April 2018
- Competitors: 368 from 44 nations
- Website: Official website

Competition at external databases
- Links: IJF • EJU • JudoInside

The 2018 European Judo Championships were held in Tel Aviv, Israel from 26 to 28 April 2018.

== Medal overview ==
=== Men ===
Event	Gold	Silver	Bronze
−60 kg	Islam Yashuev; Russia	Yanislav Gerchev; Bulgaria	Ashley McKenzie; Great Britain
−60 kg	Islam Yashuev; Russia	Yanislav Gerchev; Bulgaria	Beslan Mudranov; Russia
−66 kg	Adrian Gomboc; Slovenia	Matteo Medves; Italy	Tal Flicker; Israel
−66 kg	Adrian Gomboc; Slovenia	Matteo Medves; Italy	Dzmitry Shershan; Belarus
−73 kg	Ferdinand Karapetian; Armenia	Hidayat Heydarov; Azerbaijan	Bilal Ciloglu; Turkey
−73 kg	Ferdinand Karapetian; Armenia	Hidayat Heydarov; Azerbaijan	Tommy Macias; Sweden
−81 kg	Sagi Muki; Israel	Sami Chouchi; Belgium	Antonio Esposito; Italy
−81 kg	Sagi Muki; Israel	Sami Chouchi; Belgium	Aslan Lappinagov; Russia
−90 kg	Mikhail Igolnikov; Russia	Nemanja Majdov; Serbia	Nikoloz Sherazadishvili; Spain
−90 kg	Mikhail Igolnikov; Russia	Nemanja Majdov; Serbia	Theodoros Tselidis; Greece
−100 kg	Toma Nikiforov; Belgium	Cyrille Maret; France	Zelym Kotsoiev; Azerbaijan
−100 kg	Toma Nikiforov; Belgium	Cyrille Maret; France	Peter Paltchik; Israel
+100 kg	Lukáš Krpálek; Czech Republic	Tamerlan Bashaev; Russia	Henk Grol; Netherlands
+100 kg	Lukáš Krpálek; Czech Republic	Tamerlan Bashaev; Russia	Stephan Hegyi; Austria

=== Women ===
Event	Gold	Silver	Bronze
−48 kg	Irina Dolgova; Russia	Éva Csernoviczki; Hungary	Maryna Cherniak; Ukraine
−48 kg	Irina Dolgova; Russia	Éva Csernoviczki; Hungary	Milica Nikolić; Serbia
−52 kg	Natalia Kuziutina; Russia	Distria Krasniqi; Kosovo	Gefen Primo; Israel
−52 kg	Natalia Kuziutina; Russia	Distria Krasniqi; Kosovo	Evelyne Tschopp; Switzerland
−57 kg	Nora Gjakova; Kosovo	Theresa Stoll; Germany	Anastasiia Konkina; Russia
−57 kg	Nora Gjakova; Kosovo	Theresa Stoll; Germany	Telma Monteiro; Portugal
−63 kg	Clarisse Agbegnenou; France	Tina Trstenjak; Slovenia	Lucy Renshall; Great Britain
−63 kg	Clarisse Agbegnenou; France	Tina Trstenjak; Slovenia	Martyna Trajdos; Germany
−70 kg	Kim Polling; Netherlands	Sally Conway; Great Britain	Gemma Howell; Great Britain
−70 kg	Kim Polling; Netherlands	Sally Conway; Great Britain	Michaela Polleres; Austria
−78 kg	Madeleine Malonga; France	Audrey Tcheumeo; France	Natalie Powell; Great Britain
−78 kg	Madeleine Malonga; France	Audrey Tcheumeo; France	Anna-Maria Wagner; Germany
+78 kg	Romane Dicko; France	Larisa Cerić; Bosnia and Herzegovina	Yelyzaveta Kalanina; Ukraine
+78 kg	Romane Dicko; France	Larisa Cerić; Bosnia and Herzegovina	Tessie Savelkouls; Netherlands

=== Medal table ===
Rank	Nation	Gold	Silver	Bronze	Total
1	Russia (RUS)	4	1	3	8
2	France (FRA)	3	2	0	5
3	Belgium (BEL)	1	1	0	2
3	Kosovo (KOS)	1	1	0	2
3	Slovenia (SLO)	1	1	0	2
6	Israel (ISR)*	1	0	3	4
7	Netherlands (NED)	1	0	2	3
8	Armenia (ARM)	1	0	0	1
8	Czech Republic (CZE)	1	0	0	1
10	Great Britain (GBR)	0	1	4	5
11	Germany (GER)	0	1	2	3
12	Azerbaijan (AZE)	0	1	1	2
12	Italy (ITA)	0	1	1	2
12	Serbia (SRB)	0	1	1	2
15	Bosnia and Herzegovina (BIH)	0	1	0	1
15	Bulgaria (BUL)	0	1	0	1
15	Hungary (HUN)	0	1	0	1
18	Austria (AUT)	0	0	2	2
18	Ukraine (UKR)	0	0	2	2
20	Belarus (BLR)	0	0	1	1
20	Greece (GRE)	0	0	1	1
20	Portugal (POR)	0	0	1	1
20	Spain (ESP)	0	0	1	1
20	Sweden (SWE)	0	0	1	1
20	Switzerland (SUI)	0	0	1	1
20	Turkey (TUR)	0	0	1	1
Totals (26 entries)		14	14	28	56

== Participating nations ==
There was a total of 368 participants from 44 nations.

- Albania (3)
- Armenia (3)
- Austria (9)
- Azerbaijan (16)
- Belarus (9)
- Belgium (14)
- Bosnia and Herzegovina (5)
- Bulgaria (4)
- Croatia (7)
- Cyprus (5)
- Czech Republic (5)
- Denmark (2)
- Estonia (4)
- France (18)
- Georgia (9)
- Germany (12)
- Great Britain (12)
- Greece (4)
- Hungary (14)
- Iceland (3)
- Ireland (3)
- Israel (17)
- Italy (16)
- Kosovo (4)
- Latvia (3)
- Lithuania (6)
- Luxembourg (1)
- Moldova (7)
- Monaco (1)
- Montenegro (9)
- Netherlands (16)
- Norway (1)
- Poland (11)
- Portugal (15)
- Romania (11)
- Russia (18)
- Serbia (6)
- Slovakia (5)
- Slovenia (13)
- Spain (9)
- Sweden (6)
- Switzerland (5)
- Turkey (12)
- Ukraine (15)
