= Adrian Gomboc =

Slovenian judoka (born 1995)

Personal information
- Born: 20 January 1995 (age 31) Murska Sobota, Slovenia
- Occupation: Judoka

Sport
- Country: Slovenia
- Sport: Judo
- Weight class: ‍–‍66 kg

Achievements and titles
- Olympic Games: 5th (2016)
- World Champ.: R32 (2018, 2019)
- European Champ.: (gold) (2018)
Medal record
Men's judo
Representing Slovenia
European Championships
Gold medal – first place	2018 Tel Aviv	‍–‍66 kg
Silver medal – second place	2017 Warsaw	‍–‍66 kg
IJF Grand Prix
Gold medal – first place	2016 Budapest	‍–‍66 kg
Gold medal – first place	2018 Agadir	‍–‍66 kg
Gold medal – first place	2018 Tashkent	‍–‍66 kg
Bronze medal – third place	2014 Zagreb	‍–‍66 kg
Bronze medal – third place	2019 Perth	‍–‍66 kg
World Juniors Championships
Bronze medal – third place	2013 Ljubljana	‍–‍66 kg

Profile at external databases
- IJF: 7805
- JudoInside.com: 73712
- Updated on 11 November 2022

Adrian Gomboc (Hungarian: Gombóc Adrián; born 20 January 1995) is a Slovenian judoka. He is a member of the Hungarian community in Slovenia.

Gomboc competed at the 2016 Summer Olympics in Rio de Janeiro, in the men's 66 kg, and placed fifth. He is the 2017 European silver medalist in the ‍–‍66 kg division.

In 2021, Gomboc competed at the 2020 Summer Olympics in Tokyo, Japan, in the men's 66 kg and finished on 7th place.
