= Sinan Sandal =

Turkish judoka (born 1989)

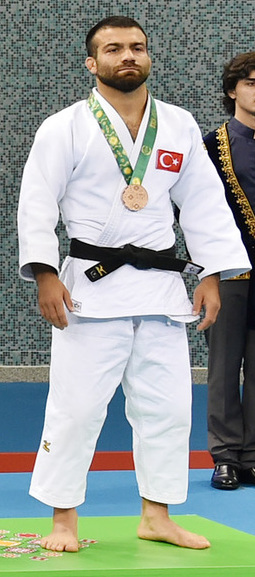

Personal information
- Born: 24 February 1989 (age 37)
- Occupation: Judoka

Sport
- Country: Turkey
- Sport: Judo
- Weight class: ‍–‍66 kg

Achievements and titles
- World Champ.: R16 (2017)
- European Champ.: 7th (2017)
Medal record
Men's judo
Representing Turkey
IJF Grand Prix
Bronze medal – third place	2015 Zagreb	‍–‍66 kg
Bronze medal – third place	2016 Tbilisi	‍–‍66 kg
Bronze medal – third place	2017 Zagreb	‍–‍66 kg

Profile at external databases
- IJF: 11931
- JudoInside.com: 84425
- Updated on 7 December 2022

Sinan Sandal (born 24 February 1989) is a Turkish judoka.

Sandal is a bronze medalist from the 2017 Judo Grand Prix Zagreb in the ‍–‍66 kg category.
