= Ashley McKenzie =

Jamaican judoka (born 1989)

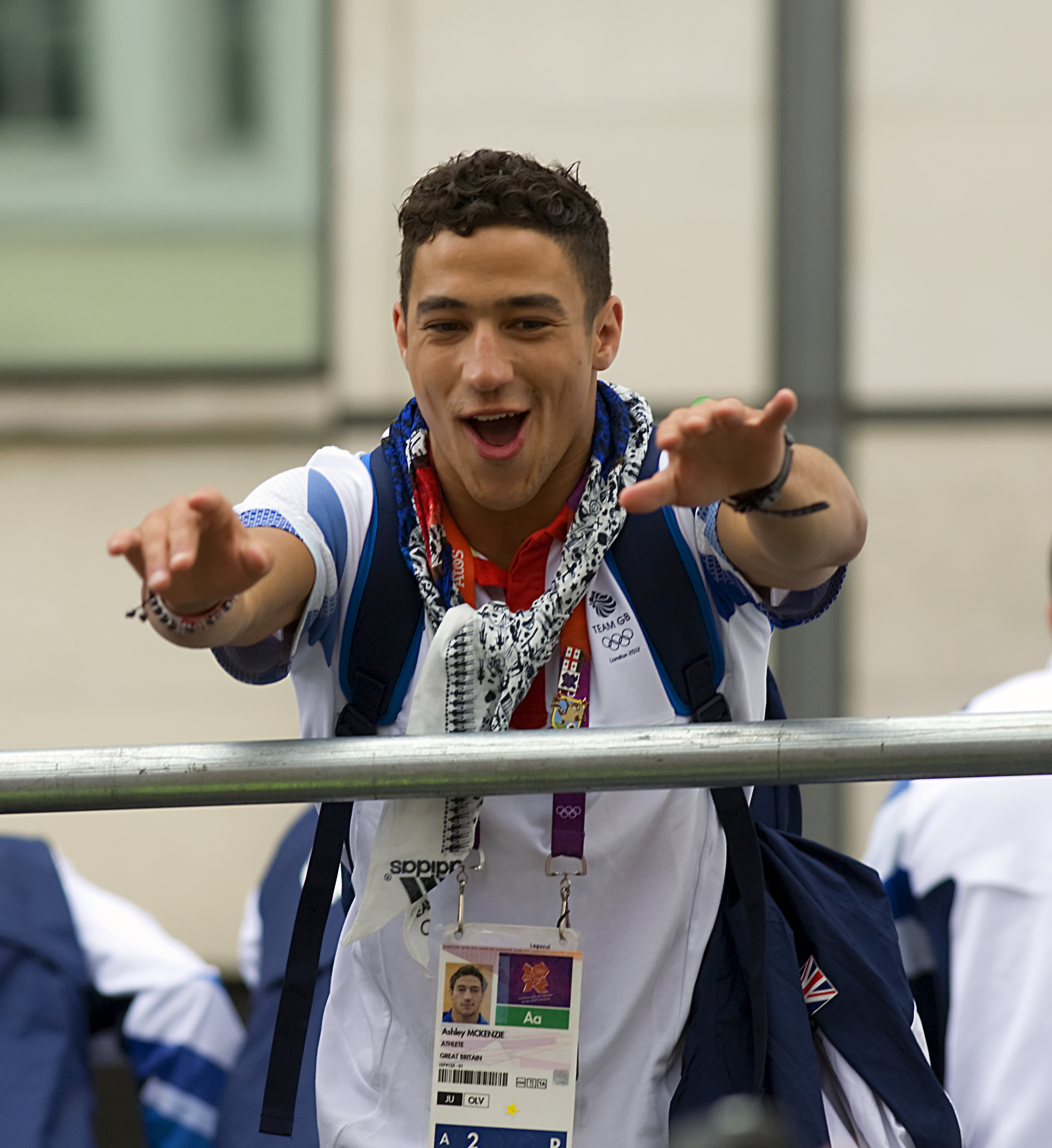
- McKenzie at the Our Greatest Team Parade in September 2012

Personal information
- Nationality: British, Jamaican
- Born: 17 July 1989 (age 37) Queen's Park, Greater London, England
- Occupation: Judoka

Sport
- Country: Great Britain (until 2022); Jamaica (since 2023)
- Sport: Judo
- Weight class: –60 kg

Achievements and titles
- Olympic Games: R16 (2016, 2024)
- World Champ.: R16 (2014)
- European Champ.: (bronze) (2013, 2018)
- Commonwealth Games: (gold) (2014, 2022)
Medal record
Men's judo
Representing Great Britain
European Championships
Bronze medal – third place	2013 Budapest	‍–‍60 kg
Bronze medal – third place	2018 Tel Aviv	‍–‍60 kg
IJF Grand Slam
Silver medal – second place	2015 Tyumen	‍–‍60 kg
Bronze medal – third place	2016 Baku	‍–‍60 kg
Bronze medal – third place	2018 Paris	‍–‍60 kg
IJF Grand Prix
Silver medal – second place	2017 The Hague	‍–‍60 kg
Silver medal – second place	2019 Zagreb	‍–‍60 kg
Silver medal – second place	2019 Perth	‍–‍60 kg
Bronze medal – third place	2013 Miami	‍–‍60 kg
Bronze medal – third place	2014 Havana	‍–‍60 kg
Bronze medal – third place	2017 Cancún	‍–‍60 kg
Bronze medal – third place	2018 Zagreb	‍–‍60 kg
Bronze medal – third place	2019 Antalya	‍–‍60 kg
European U23 Championships
Gold medal – first place	2010 Sarajevo	‍–‍60 kg
Bronze medal – third place	2009 Antalya	‍–‍60 kg
European Junior Championships
Bronze medal – third place	2007 Prague	‍–‍60 kg
European Cadet Championships
Bronze medal – third place	2005 Salzburg	‍–‍50 kg
Representing England
Commonwealth Games
Gold medal – first place	2014 Glasgow	‍–‍60 kg
Gold medal – first place	2022 Birmingham	‍–‍60 kg
Representing Jamaica
Central American and Caribbean Games
Silver medal – second place	2023 San Salvador	‍–‍60 kg

Profile at external databases
- IJF: 86, 73881
- JudoInside.com: 31875
- Updated on 27 July 2024

Ashley McKenzie (born 17 July 1989) is a judoka competing at the men's 60 kg division. Born in England, he represents Jamaica internationally and has competed for Great Britain in the past. He was a member of the Great Britain Olympic Judo Team at London 2012 but was defeated in the second round by Hiroaki Hiraoka of Japan. He also appeared in, and made it to the final of, Celebrity Big Brother 10 in September 2012. In August 2018, he appeared on the first series of Celebs on the Farm. In January 2020, he appeared on Celebrity Ex on the Beach.

== Personal life ==
McKenzie was born in Queen's Park, London. He is mixed-race. He was diagnosed with attention deficit hyperactivity disorder (ADHD) at an early age.

McKenzie was first exposed to judo at the age of 11, when he got into a fight with a boy who stole his Charizard Pokémon card. Determined to get it back he joined the Moberly Judo Club where he met his assailant by chance. He eventually got his card back after befriending the boy.

McKenzie welcomed his first daughter Lana-Rose McKenzie in July 2017 with girlfriend - fellow Judo player and 3 time European champion Automne Pavia.

Ashley is also a brand ambassador for The Money Group, who are sponsoring him for Tokyo 2020.

== Career ==
His achievements include winning gold at the British Open in 2008, 2009, 2010, 2012, and 2015. McKenzie's first foray into the European U23 Championships in 2009 resulted in a bronze medal win at Antalya. In 2010, he became the second British athlete in history to be crowned an under-23 European champion when he competed in Sarajevo. In 2011, McKenzie earned bronze and gold in the European Cup competitions within Orenburg and Hamburg, respectively. He was the 2011 Judo World Cup champion within Poland and Great Britain. He also earned bronze at the European Championships 2013 in Budapest. From 2013 to 2014, he was the back-to-back champion of the Pan-American Open in Uruguay. McKenzie would then achieve gold in the 2014 Commonwealth Games. He competed at the International Judo Federation Grand Slam 2015 in Tyumen where he won silver. McKenzie won bronze at the International Judo Federation Grand Slam 2016 in Baku.

On 15 August 2012, McKenzie entered the Celebrity Big Brother 10 reality TV series. After 24 days McKenzie made it to the final and finished in fifth place.

In May 2019, McKenzie was selected to compete at the 2019 European Games in Minsk, Belarus.

In 2020 he was part of the original cast of the eleventh series of Ex on the Beach UK. In 2023, McKenzie competed on the reality-competition series The Challenge UK.

In 2023, McKenzie switched allegiances to Jamaica and captured a silver medal at the 2023 CAC Games.

== Achievements ==
Complete list at judoinside.com

Grand Slam	Azerbaijan	2016	Bronze
Grand Slam	Russia	2015	Silver
British Open	United Kingdom	2015	British Champion
Commonwealth Games	Scotland	2014	Gold
Pan-American Open	Uruguay	2014	Gold
Pan-American Open	Uruguay	2013	Gold
European Championships	Budapest	2013	Bronze
British Open	United Kingdom	2012	British Champion
World Cup	United Kingdom	2011	Gold
European Cup	Germany	2011	Gold
European Cup	Germany	2011	Bronze
World Cup	Poland	2011	Gold
European U23 Championships	Sarajevo	2010	Gold
British Open	United Kingdom	2010	British Champion
British Open	United Kingdom	2009	British Champion
British Judo Association Annual Awards	United Kingdom	2009	British Junior Male of the Year
European U23 Championships	Turkey	2009	Bronze
British Open	United Kingdom	2008	British Champion
