= Andraž Jereb =

Slovenian judoka (born 1992)

Personal information
- Born: 8 April 1992 (age 34)
- Occupation: Judoka

Sport
- Country: Slovenia
- Sport: Judo
- Weight class: ‍–‍66 kg

Achievements and titles
- World Champ.: R32 (2014, 2015)
- European Champ.: R16 (2019)
Medal record
Men's judo
Representing Slovenia
IJF Grand Prix
Gold medal – first place	2016 Zagreb	‍–‍66 kg
Bronze medal – third place	2013 Tashkent	‍–‍66 kg
Bronze medal – third place	2016 Ulaanbaatar	‍–‍66 kg
Bronze medal – third place	2016 Tashkent	‍–‍66 kg
Bronze medal – third place	2018 Agadir	‍–‍66 kg
European U23 Championships
Silver medal – second place	2010 Sarajevo	‍–‍66 kg
Silver medal – second place	2014 Wrocław	‍–‍66 kg
Bronze medal – third place	2013 Samokov	‍–‍66 kg
European Junior Championships
Silver medal – second place	2011 Lommel	‍–‍66 kg

Profile at external databases
- IJF: 3426
- JudoInside.com: 45721
- Updated on 5 December 2022

Andraž Jereb (born 8 April 1992) is a Slovenian judoka.

Jereb is the gold medalist of the 2016 Judo Grand Prix Zagreb in the ‍–‍66 kg category.
