= Pavel Petřikov (Czech judoka born 1986) =

Czech judoka born 1986

Personal information
- Born: 20 June 1986 (age 40) Hořice, Czechoslovakia
- Occupation: Judoka

Sport
- Country: Czech Republic
- Sport: Judo
- Weight class: ‍–‍60 kg, ‍–‍66 kg

Achievements and titles
- Olympic Games: R16 (2016)
- World Champ.: 5th (2017)
- European Champ.: 5th (2019)
Medal record
Men's judo
Representing Czech Republic
IJF Grand Slam
Bronze medal – third place	2013 Baku	‍–‍60 kg
IJF Grand Prix
Bronze medal – third place	2014 Zagreb	‍–‍60 kg
European U23 Championships
Gold medal – first place	2008 Zagreb	‍–‍60 kg
Summer Universiade
Bronze medal – third place	2013 Kazan	‍–‍60 kg

Profile at external databases
- IJF: 607
- JudoInside.com: 37932
- Updated on 27 November 2022

Pavel Petříkov (born 20 June 1986) is a Czech judoka. He competed at the 2016 Summer Olympics in the men's 60 kg event, in which he was eliminated in the third round by Naohisa Takato.

Petříkov was born in Hořice. He is the son of Czech judoka Pavel Petřikov Sr.

== Achievements ==
Year	Tournament	Place	Weight class
2008	European Championships	7th	Extra lightweight (60 kg)
