= Kilian Le Blouch =

French judoka (born 1989)

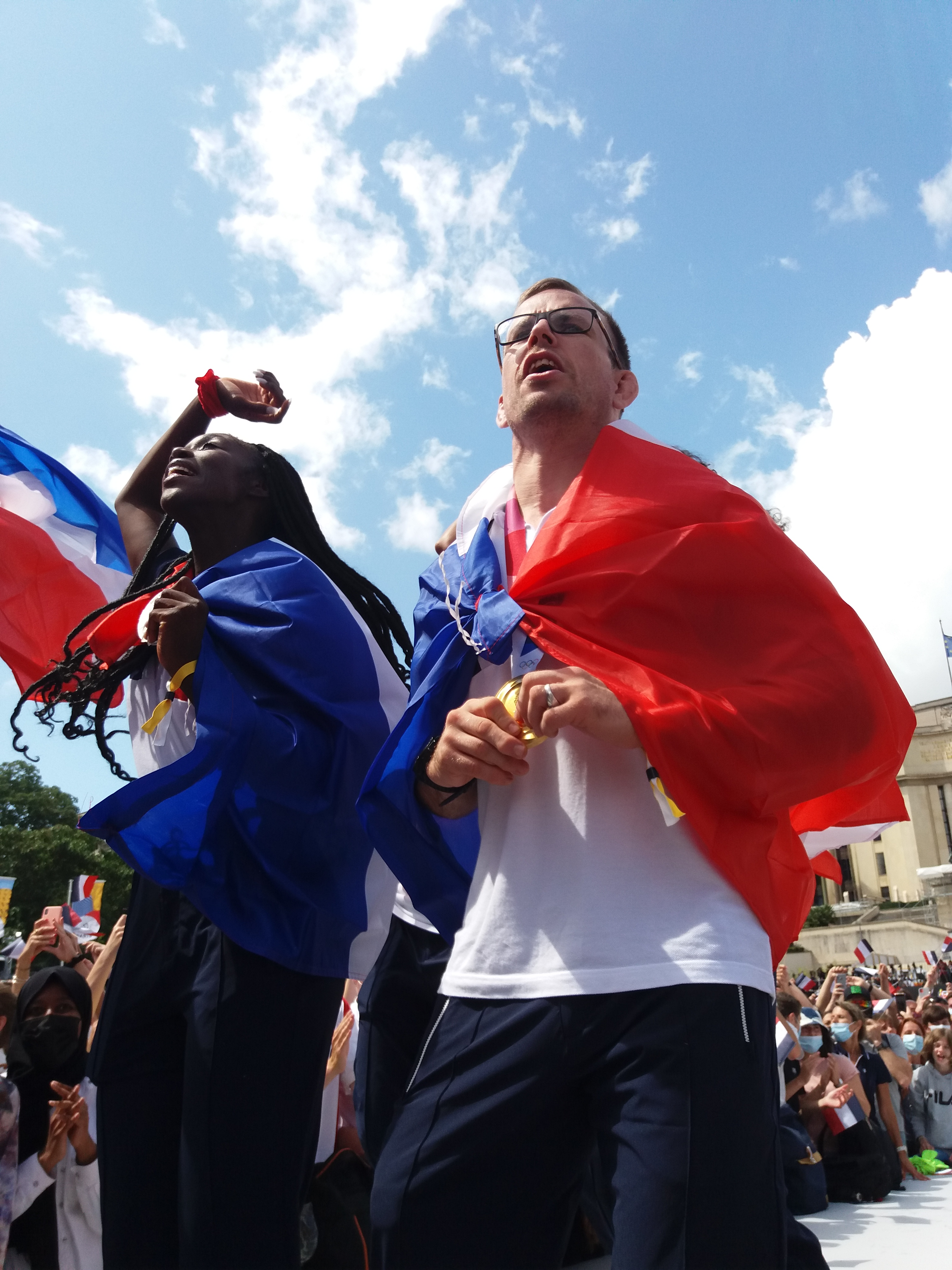
- Le Blouch in 2021

Personal information
- Born: 7 October 1989 (age 37) Clamart, France
- Occupation: Judoka
- Height: 1.71 m (5 ft 7 in)
- Weight: 70 kg (154 lb)

Sport
- Country: France
- Sport: Judo
- Weight class: ‍–‍66 kg

Achievements and titles
- Olympic Games: R16 (2016, 2020)
- World Champ.: 7th (2021)
- European Champ.: (bronze) (2020)
Medal record
Men's judo
Representing France
Olympic Games
Gold medal – first place	2020 Tokyo	Mixed team
European Championships
Bronze medal – third place	2020 Prague	‍–‍66 kg
IJF Grand Slam
Gold medal – first place	2019 Ekaterinburg	‍–‍66 kg
Bronze medal – third place	2016 Paris	‍–‍66 kg
Bronze medal – third place	2019 Brasilia	‍–‍66 kg
IJF Grand Prix
Bronze medal – third place	2016 Almaty	‍–‍66 kg
Bronze medal – third place	2018 Antalya	‍–‍66 kg
Bronze medal – third place	2019 Zagreb	‍–‍66 kg
European U23 Championships
Bronze medal – third place	2011 Tyumen	‍–‍66 kg

Profile at external databases
- IJF: 4739
- JudoInside.com: 68297
- Updated on 10 November 2022

Kilian Le Blouch (born 7 October 1989) is a French judoka. He competed at the 2016 Summer Olympics in the men's 66 kg event, in which he was eliminated in the third round by An Baul.
