= Matej Poliak =

Slovak judoka (born 1993)

Personal information
- Born: 19 January 1993 (age 33)
- Occupation: Judoka

Sport
- Country: Slovakia
- Sport: Judo
- Weight class: ‍–‍66 kg

Achievements and titles
- World Champ.: R32 (2021, 2023)
- European Champ.: (bronze) (2017)
Medal record
Men's judo
Representing Slovakia
European Championships
Bronze medal – third place	2017 Warsaw	‍–‍66 kg

Profile at external databases
- IJF: 9491
- JudoInside.com: 51368
- Updated on 8 May 2023

Matej Poliak (born 19 January 1993) is a Slovak judoka. He is a 2017 European bronze medalist in the 66 kg division.
