= Nathon Burns =

Irish judoka (born 1989)

Personal information
- Born: 9 March 1989 (age 37)
- Occupation: Judoka
- Height: 165 cm (5 ft 5 in)

Sport
- Country: Ireland; Northern Ireland
- Sport: Judo
- Weight class: ‍–‍66 kg
- Rank: 3rd dan black belt
- Club: Camberley Judo Club and club 62 judo

Achievements and titles
- World Champ.: R16 (2018)
- European Champ.: 7th (2019)
- Commonwealth Games: (bronze) (2022)
Medal record
Men's judo
Representing Ireland
IJF Grand Prix
Bronze medal – third place	2019 Montreal	‍–‍66 kg
Representing Northern Ireland
Commonwealth Games
Bronze medal – third place	2022 Birmingham	‍–‍66 kg

Profile at external databases
- IJF: 40152
- JudoInside.com: 37180
- Updated on 29 November 2022

Nathon Burns (born 22 June 1989) is an Irish judoka. Burns is based at Camberley Judo Club in Surrey; he was previously at Yamakwai in Belfast. A third dan black belt, he describes seoi nage as his favourite technique.

Burns represented Ireland at the 2019 European Games, reaching the last eight in the 66 kg event. He won a bronze medal at the 2022 Commonwealth Games, competing for Northern Ireland in the 66 kg category.
