= 2015 World Judo Championships – Women's +78 kg =

Judo competition

Judo Women's +78 kg at the 2015 World Judo Championships
- Venue: Alau Ice Palace
- Location: Astana, Kazakhstan
- Date: 29 August
- Competitors: 34 from 26 nations
- Total prize money: 14,000$

Medalists
gold medal	Yu Song (1st title)	China
silver medal	Megumi Tachimoto	Japan
bronze medal	Kanae Yamabe	Japan
bronze medal	Idalys Ortiz	Cuba

Competition at external databases
- Links: IJF • JudoInside

The women's +78 kg competition of the 2015 World Judo Championships was held on 29 August 2015.

== Results ==
=== Finals ===
Semi-finals
(China) Yu Song	001
(China) Ma Sisi	000
(Japan) Megumi Tachimoto	001
(Russia) Ksenia Chibisova	000

Final
(China) Yu Song	000
(Japan) Megumi Tachimoto	000

=== Repechage ===
Repechage		Third place
(Japan) Kanae Yamabe	000
(Mexico) Vanessa Zambotti	000	(Japan) Kanae Yamabe	101
		(Russia) Ksenia Chibisova	000

Repechage		Third place
(Cuba) Idalys Ortiz	100
(Germany) Franziska Konitz	000	(Cuba) Idalys Ortiz	100
		(China) Ma Sisi	000

=== Pool A ===
First Round
(Belarus) Maryna Slutskaya	101
(Croatia) Ivana Šutalo	000

Quarterfinals
(China) Yu Song	111
(Turkey) Belkıs Zehra Kaya	000
(Bosnia and Herzegovina) Larisa Cerić	000
(Lithuania) Santa Pakenytė	000
(Japan) Kanae Yamabe	100
(Belarus) Maryna Slutskaya	000
(Germany) Jasmin Külbs	100
(Uzbekistan) Saneayim Erkinbaeva	000

Semifinals
(China) Yu Song	010
(Bosnia and Herzegovina) Larisa Cerić	000
(Japan) Kanae Yamabe	000
(Germany) Jasmin Külbs	000

Final
(China) Yu Song	101
(Japan) Kanae Yamabe	000

=== Pool B ===
Quarterfinals		Semifinals		Final
(Tunisia) Nihel Cheikh Rouhou	010
(South Korea) Kim Ji-youn	000	(Tunisia) Nihel Cheikh Rouhou	000
(Mexico) Vanessa Zambotti	100	(Mexico) Vanessa Zambotti	000
(Ukraine) Iryna Kindzerska	000			(Mexico) Vanessa Zambotti	000
(China) Ma Sisi	010			(China) Ma Sisi	100
(Brazil) Rochele Nunes	000	(China) Ma Sisi	100
(Senegal) Monica Sagna	000	(Kyrgyzstan) Nagira Sarbashova	000
(Kyrgyzstan) Nagira Sarbashova	100

=== Pool C ===
Quarterfinals		Semifinals		Final
(Cuba) Idalys Ortiz	100
(Mongolia) Odkhüügiin Javzmaa	000	(Cuba) Idalys Ortiz	003
(Turkey) Kayra Sayit	100	(Turkey) Kayra Sayit	000
(Lithuania) Sandra Jablonskytė	000			(Cuba) Idalys Ortiz	000
(France) Emilie Andeol	000			(Japan) Megumi Tachimoto	000
(Japan) Megumi Tachimoto	100	(Japan) Megumi Tachimoto	000
(South Korea) Kim Min-jeong	100	(South Korea) Kim Min-jeong	000
(Brazil) Maria Suelen Altheman	000

=== Pool D ===
First Round
(Poland) Katarzyna Furmanek	100
(Chile) Giordanna Gutiérrez	000

Quarterfinals
(Germany) Franziska Konitz	000
(Kazakhstan) Gulzhan Issanova	000
(Netherlands) Tessie Savelkouls	001
(Algeria) Sonia Asselah	000
(Ukraine) Svitlana Iaromka	100
(United States) Nina Cutro-Kelly	000
(Poland) Katarzyna Furmanek	000
(Russia) Ksenia Chibisova	100

Semifinals
(Germany) Franziska Konitz	100
(Netherlands) Tessie Savelkouls	000
(Ukraine) Svitlana Iaromka	010
(Russia) Ksenia Chibisova	101

Final
(Germany) Franziska Konitz	000
(Russia) Ksenia Chibisova	100

== Prize money ==
The sums listed bring the total prizes awarded to 14,000$ for the individual event.

Medal	Total	Judoka	Coach
Gold	6,000$	4,800$	1,200$
Silver	4,000$	3,200$	800$
Bronze	2,000$	1,600$	400$
