= 2016 European Judo Championships – Women's +78 kg =

Judo Women's +78 kg at the 2016 European Judo Championships
- Venue: TatNeft Arena
- Location: Kazan, Russia
- Date: 23 April
- Competitors: 18 from 14 nations

Medalists
| gold medal | Kayra Sayit (1st title) | Turkey |
| silver medal | Svitlana Iaromka | Ukraine |
| bronze medal | Jasmin Grabowski | Germany |
| bronze medal | Belkıs Zehra Kaya | Turkey |

Competition at external databases
- Links: IJF • JudoInside

The women's +78 kg competition at the 2016 European Judo Championships was held on 23 April at the TatNeft Arena, in Kazan, the largest city and capital of Tatarstan, Russia.

== Results ==
=== Finals ===
| Final |
| Kayra Sayit (TUR) | 10 |
| Svitlana Iaromka (UKR) | 00 |

=== Repechage ===
Repechage
Émilie Andéol (FRA) | 00
Carolin Weiß (GER) | 10

Third place
Carolin Weiß (GER) | 00
Jasmin Grabowski (GER) | 01

Repechage
Ksenia Chibisova (RUS) | 00
Belkıs Zehra Kaya (TUR) | 10

Third place
Belkıs Zehra Kaya (TUR) | 10
Santa Pakenytė (LTU) | 00

=== Top Half ===
First round
Milica Žabić (SRB) | 01
Mercedesz Szigetvári (HUN) | 10

Round of 16
Émilie Andéol (FRA) | 00
Sarah Adlington (GBR) | 00
Kayra Sayit (TUR) | 10
Mercedesz Szigetvári (HUN) | 00
Iryna Kindzerska (UKR) | 00
Santa Pakenytė (LTU) | 10
Tessie Savelkouls (NED) | 00
Carolin Weiß (GER) | 00

Quarterfinals
Émilie Andéol (FRA) | 00
Kayra Sayit (TUR) | 00
Santa Pakenytė (LTU) | 10
Carolin Weiß (GER) | 00

Final
Kayra Sayit (TUR) | 10
Santa Pakenytė (LTU) | 00

=== Bottom half ===
First round
Maryna Slutskaya (BLR) | 10
Ivana Šutalo (CRO) | 00

Round of 16
Svitlana Iaromka (UKR) | 00
Larisa Cerić (BIH) | 00
Ksenia Chibisova (RUS) | 10
Katarzyna Furmanek (POL) | 00
Jasmin Grabowski (GER) | 00
Sandra Jablonskytė (LTU) | 00
Belkıs Zehra Kaya (TUR) | 10
Maryna Slutskaya (BLR) | 00

Quarterfinals
Svitlana Iaromka (UKR) | 10
Ksenia Chibisova (RUS) | 01
Jasmin Grabowski (GER) | 10
Belkıs Zehra Kaya (TUR) | 00

Final
Svitlana Iaromka (UKR) | 10
Jasmin Grabowski (GER) | 00
