= Idalys Ortiz =

Cuban judoka (born 1989)

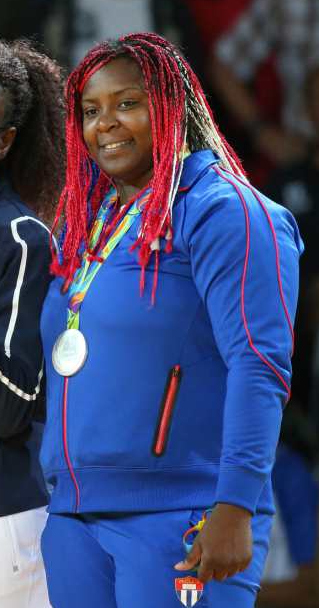
- Ortiz at the 2016 Summer Olympics

Personal information
- Full name: Idalys Ortiz Boucurt
- Born: 27 September 1989 (age 37) Pinar del Río, Cuba
- Occupation: Judoka
- Height: 180 cm (5 ft 11 in)

Sport
- Country: Cuba
- Sport: Judo
- Weight class: +78 kg
- Retired: 2024

Achievements and titles
- Olympic Games: (gold) (2012)
- World Champ.: (gold) (2013, 2014)
- Pan American Champ.: (gold) (2007, 2008, 2009, 2009, 2010, 2010, 2011, 2012, 2013, 2014, 2015, 2016, 2018, 2019)
Medal record
Women's judo
Representing Cuba
Olympic Games
Gold medal – first place	2012 London	+78 kg
Silver medal – second place	2016 Rio de Janeiro	+78 kg
Silver medal – second place	2020 Tokyo	+78 kg
Bronze medal – third place	2008 Beijing	+78 kg
World Championships
Gold medal – first place	2013 Rio de Janeiro	+78 kg
Gold medal – first place	2014 Chelyabinsk	+78 kg
Silver medal – second place	2018 Baku	+78 kg
Silver medal – second place	2019 Tokyo	+78 kg
Bronze medal – third place	2009 Rotterdam	+78 kg
Bronze medal – third place	2010 Tokyo	+78 kg
Bronze medal – third place	2015 Astana	+78 kg
Bronze medal – third place	2017 Marrakesh	Open
Pan American Games
Gold medal – first place	2011 Guadalajara	+78 kg
Gold medal – first place	2015 Toronto	+78 kg
Gold medal – first place	2019 Lima	+78 kg
Gold medal – first place	2023 Santiago	+78 kg
Gold medal – first place	2023 Santiago	Mixed team
Pan American Championships
Gold medal – first place	2007 Montreal	Open
Gold medal – first place	2008 Miami	+78 kg
Gold medal – first place	2009 Buenos Aires	+78 kg
Gold medal – first place	2009 Buenos Aires	Open
Gold medal – first place	2010 San Salvador	+78 kg
Gold medal – first place	2010 San Salvador	Open
Gold medal – first place	2011 Guadalajara	+78 kg
Gold medal – first place	2012 Montreal	+78 kg
Gold medal – first place	2013 San José	+78 kg
Gold medal – first place	2014 Guayaquil	+78 kg
Gold medal – first place	2015 Edmonton	+78 kg
Gold medal – first place	2016 Havana	+78 kg
Gold medal – first place	2018 San José	+78 kg
Gold medal – first place	2019 Lima	+78 kg
Silver medal – second place	2023 Calgary	+78 kg
Bronze medal – third place	2024 Rio de Janeiro	+78 kg
World Masters
Gold medal – first place	2016 Guadalajara	+78 kg
Silver medal – second place	2017 Saint Petersburg	+78 kg
Silver medal – second place	2018 Guangzhou	+78 kg
Bronze medal – third place	2013 Tyumen	+78 kg
IJF Grand Slam
Gold medal – first place	2018 Osaka	+78 kg
Gold medal – first place	2019 Paris	+78 kg
Gold medal – first place	2019 Düsseldorf	+78 kg
Silver medal – second place	2009 Paris	+78 kg
Silver medal – second place	2010 Tokyo	+78 kg
Silver medal – second place	2012 Tokyo	+78 kg
Silver medal – second place	2013 Paris	+78 kg
Silver medal – second place	2015 Tokyo	+78 kg
Silver medal – second place	2019 Osaka	+78 kg
Silver medal – second place	2022 Budapest	+78 kg
Bronze medal – third place	2010 Paris	+78 kg
Bronze medal – third place	2010 Rio de Janeiro	+78 kg
Bronze medal – third place	2011 Paris	+78 kg
Bronze medal – third place	2012 Paris	+78 kg
Bronze medal – third place	2013 Tokyo	+78 kg
Bronze medal – third place	2014 Paris	+78 kg
Bronze medal – third place	2020 Düsseldorf	+78 kg
IJF Grand Prix
Gold medal – first place	2016 Havana	+78 kg
Gold medal – first place	2016 Almaty	+78 kg
Gold medal – first place	2016 Ulaanbaatar	+78 kg
Gold medal – first place	2018 Budapest	+78 kg
Gold medal – first place	2018 Cancún	+78 kg
Gold medal – first place	2019 Hohhot	+78 kg
Bronze medal – third place	2012 Düsseldorf	+78 kg
Bronze medal – third place	2013 Miami	+78 kg
Bronze medal – third place	2015 Budapest	+78 kg
Bronze medal – third place	2019 Budapest	+78 kg
Bronze medal – third place	2024 Linz	+78 kg
Summer Universiade
Gold medal – first place	2013 Kazan	Open
Silver medal – second place	2013 Kazan	+78 kg

Profile at external databases
- IJF: 951
- JudoInside.com: 40374
- Updated on 29 April 2024

Idalys Ortiz Bocourt (born 27 September 1989) is a Cuban retired judoka. She competed in the over 78 kg division at the 2008, 2012 and 2016 Olympics and won a medal on each occasion. She won the silver medal in the women's +78 kg event at the 2020 Summer Olympics held in Tokyo, Japan. She announced her retirement from active sports after falling in the round of 16 at the Paris 2024 Olympic Games.

== Career ==
Ortiz took up judo at age ten and was included in the national team at 15. At the age of 18, she became the youngest Olympic medalist in the heavyweight category, winning a bronze medal in 2008. In 2013 and 2016, she was named Cuban Athlete of the Year.

=== Beijing Olympics ===
In her first match at the 2008 Olympic Games in Beijing, she stood against a big (170 lb) Egyptian judoka Samah Ramadan. Ramadan stayed and waited for an opportunity to use her possibly only technique, which was immobilizing her opponent by lying on top. During the match, Ortiz tried many techniques for ippon, but none were successful, except for the last move just a few seconds before the end of the match when Samah Ramadan was already tired.

In her second match in Beijing, Ortiz went against Janelle Shepherd from Australia. The match had a good tempo and ended quickly with Ortiz making an ippon (an okuri-eri-jime). In the third match, the semifinals, she went against later Olympic champion and controversial judoka Tong Wen from China. This was a close match full of action and could have gone either way. However, Wen won the match as one of Ortiz's techniques was counted as yuko. Ortiz won the bronze medal in her match against Dorjgotovyn Tserenkhand from Mongolia, winning with a nice ippon (O-goshi).

=== 2012 Summer Olympics ===
At the 2012 Olympics, Ortiz won the gold medal. She beat Adysângela Moniz with a tsuri-goshi in her first match. She then beat Yelena Ivashchenko before avenging her 2008 defeat by Tong Wen, beating her with a te-guruma. She then beat Mika Sugimoto in the final. She was the first non-Asian winner of the heavyweight category and the first Cuban judo gold medalist in 12 years.

At the 2015 Pan American Championships, she beat Vanessa Zambotti in the final, having beaten Nina Cutro-Kelly in the semifinals. It was one of three gold medals for Cuba.

=== 2016 Summer Olympics ===
At the 2016 Olympics, Ortiz completed her medal collection, winning a silver medal. She beat Kseniya Chibisova with a tawara-gaeshi, then Kim Min-Jeong with a yoko-shiho-gatame. In the semifinal she beat Kanae Yamabe with a uki-goshi before losing the final to Émilie Andéol. She finished the season ranked world number one, having won 5 IJF events along with her Olympic silver.

She won the bronze medal in the 2017 World Openweight Championships, beating Romane Dicko with a shime-waza.

In 2018, she won her first IJF title since 2016. She was also part of the Cuba team that won 5 gold medals at the 2018 Pan American Championships.

Ortiz credits her success to hard training, 7 hours a day, and a regime that involves training against men because of the few women in her weight category.

=== 2024, Flag bearer at París 2024 ===
On 3 July 2024, Ortiz and Greco-Roman wrestler Mijaín López were named as the Cuban flag bearers for the París 2024 Olympic Games opening ceremony.

Olympic Games
Preceded by Yaime Pérez; Mijaín López	Flagbearer for Cuba; París 2024; With: Julio César La Cruz	Succeeded by Incumbent
