= Judo at the 2019 European Games – Women's +78 kg =

Judo competition

Judo Women's +78 kg at the 2019 European Games
- Venue: Čyžoŭka-Arena
- Location: Minsk, Belarus
- Date: 24 June
- Competitors: 18 from 15 nations

Medalists
| gold medal | Maryna Slutskaya (2nd title) | Belarus |
| silver medal | Larisa Cerić | Bosnia and Herzegovina |
| bronze medal | Iryna Kindzerska | Azerbaijan |
| bronze medal | Ksenia Chibisova | Russia |

Competition at external databases
- Links: IJF • JudoInside

The women's +78 kg judo event at the 2019 European Games in Minsk was held on 24 June at the Čyžoŭka-Arena.

== Results ==
=== Final ===
| Final |
| Larisa Cerić (BIH) | 00 |
| Maryna Slutskaya (BLR) | 10 |

=== Repechage ===
Repechage
Galyna Tarasova (UKR) | 11
Anne Fatoumata M'Bairo (FRA) | 01

Third place
Galyna Tarasova (UKR) | 01
Iryna Kindzerska (AZE) | 11

Repechage
Sarah Adlington (GBR) | 00
Ksenia Chibisova (RUS) | 10

Third place
Ksenia Chibisova (RUS) | 10
Rochele Nunes (POR) | 00

=== Top half ===
Round of 32
Mercédesz Szigetvári (HUN) | 00
Rochele Nunes (POR) | 10

Round of 16
Larisa Cerić (BIH) | 10
Milica Žabić (SRB) | 00
Galyna Tarasova (UKR) | 10
Santa Pakenytė (LTU) | 00
Anne Fatoumata M'Bairo (FRA) | 10
Ivana Šutalo (CRO) | 00
Kayra Sayit (TUR) | 00
Rochele Nunes (POR) | 10

Quarterfinals
Larisa Cerić (BIH) | 10
Galyna Tarasova (UKR) | 01
Anne Fatoumata M'Bairo (FRA) | 00
Rochele Nunes (POR) | 10

Semifinals
Larisa Cerić (BIH) | 10
Rochele Nunes (POR) | 00

=== Bottom half ===
Round of 32
Sebile Akbulut (TUR) | 00
Jasmin Külbs (GER) | 10

Round of 16
Iryna Kindzerska (AZE) | 10
Jasmin Külbs (GER) | 00
Sarah Adlington (GBR) | 01
Emese Kárpáti (HUN) | 00
Maryna Slutskaya (BLR) | 10
Sandra Jablonskytė (LTU) | 00
Anamari Velenšek (SLO) | 00
Ksenia Chibisova (RUS) | 10

Quarterfinals
Iryna Kindzerska (AZE) | 11
Sarah Adlington (GBR) | 00
Maryna Slutskaya (BLR) | 10
Ksenia Chibisova (RUS) | 00

Semifinals
Iryna Kindzerska (AZE) | 00
Maryna Slutskaya (BLR) | 01
