= 2014 World Judo Championships – Women's +78 kg =

Judo competition

Judo Women's +78 kg at the 2014 World Judo Championships
- Venue: Traktor Ice Arena
- Location: Chelyabinsk, Russia
- Date: 30 August 2014
- Competitors: 23 from 17 nations
- Total prize money: 14,000$

Medalists
gold medal	Idalys Ortiz (2nd title)	Cuba
silver medal	Maria Altheman	Brazil
bronze medal	Megumi Tachimoto	Japan
bronze medal	Emilie Andeol	France

Competition at external databases
- Links: IJF • JudoInside

The women's +78 kg competition of the 2014 World Judo Championships was held on 30 August.

== Medalists ==
Gold	Silver	Bronze
Idalys Ortiz (CUB)	Maria Altheman (BRA)	Megumi Tachimoto (JPN); Emilie Andeol (FRA)

== Results ==
=== Finals ===
Semi-finals
(Cuba) Idalys Ortiz	100
(France) Emilie Andeol	000
(Brazil) Maria Altheman	000
(Japan) Megumi Tachimoto	000

Final
(Cuba) Idalys Ortiz	100
(Brazil) Maria Altheman	000

=== Repechage ===
Repechage		Third place
(Germany) Jasmin Külbs	000
(Japan) Kanae Yamabe	000	(Germany) Jasmin Külbs	000
		(Japan) Megumi Tachimoto	100

Repechage		Third place
(Germany) Franziska Konitz	100
(Tunisia) Nihel Cheikh Rouhou	011	(Germany) Franziska Konitz	000
		(France) Emilie Andeol	010

=== Pool A ===
Quarterfinals
(Turkey) Gülşah Kocatürk	001
(Brazil) Rochele Nunes	000
(Algeria) Sonia Asselah	000
(Germany) Jasmin Külbs	101

Semifinals
(Cuba) Idalys Ortiz	110
(Turkey) Gülşah Kocatürk	000
(South Korea) Lee Jung-eun	000
(Germany) Jasmin Külbs	000

Final
(Cuba) Idalys Ortiz	100
(Germany) Jasmin Külbs	000

=== Pool B ===
Quarterfinals
(Dominican Republic) Leidi Germán	000
(China) Gao Man	100
(Ukraine) Iryna Kindzerska	000
(Lithuania) Santa Pakenytė	001

Semifinals
(Japan) Kanae Yamabe	000
(China) Gao Man	000
(France) Emilie Andeol	000
(Lithuania) Santa Pakenytė	000

Final
(Japan) Kanae Yamabe	000
(France) Emilie Andeol	001

=== Pool C ===
Quarterfinals
(Kazakhstan) Zarina Abdrassulova	000
(Bosnia and Herzegovina) Larisa Cerić	100
(Lithuania) Sandra Jablonskytė	100
(Ukraine) Svitlana Iaromka	000

Semifinals
(Brazil) Maria Altheman	100
(Bosnia and Herzegovina) Larisa Cerić	000
(Germany) Franziska Konitz	001
(Lithuania) Sandra Jablonskytė	000

Final
(Brazil) Maria Altheman	101
(Germany) Franziska Konitz	000

=== Pool D ===
Quarterfinals
(Russia) Ksenia Chibisova	000
(China) Li Yang	100

Semifinals
(Japan) Megumi Tachimoto	100
(Mexico) Vanessa Zambotti	000
(Tunisia) Nihel Cheikh Rouhou	100
(China) Li Yang	000

Final
(Japan) Megumi Tachimoto	000
(Tunisia) Nihel Cheikh Rouhou	000

== Prize money ==
The sums listed bring the total prizes awarded to 14,000$ for the individual event.

Medal	Total	Judoka	Coach
Gold	6,000$	4,800$	1,200$
Silver	4,000$	3,200$	800$
Bronze	2,000$	1,600$	400$
