= Judo at the 2015 European Games – Women's +78 kg =

Judo competition

Judo Women's +78 kg at the 2015 European Games
- Venue: Heydar Aliyev Arena
- Location: Baku, Azerbaijan
- Date: 27 June
- Competitors: 17 from 13 nations

Medalists
gold medal	Émilie Andéol (2nd title)	France
silver medal	Jasmin Külbs	Germany
bronze medal	Belkıs Zehra Kaya	Turkey
bronze medal	Svitlana Iaromka	Ukraine

Competition at external databases
- Links: IJF • JudoInside

The women's +78 kg judo event at the 2015 European Games in Baku was held on 27 June at the Heydar Aliyev Arena.

== Results ==
=== Final ===
Final
Jasmin Külbs (GER)	000
Émilie Andéol (FRA)	101

=== Repechage ===
Repechage
Gülşah Kocatürk (TUR)	000
Santa Pakenytė (LTU)	100

Third place
Santa Pakenytė (LTU)	000
Belkıs Zehra Kaya (TUR)	111

Repechage
Iryna Kindzerska (UKR)	000
Svitlana Iaromka (UKR)	100

Third place
Svitlana Iaromka (UKR)	100
Maryna Slutskaya (BLR)	000

=== Top half ===
Round of 32

Round of 16
Franziska Konitz (GER)	000
Maryna Slutskaya (BLR)	000
Gülşah Kocatürk (TUR)	100
Jessica Zannoni (SMR)	000
Jasmin Külbs (GER)	000
Tessie Savelkouls (NED)	000
Ksenia Chibisova (RUS)	000
Santa Pakenytė (LTU)	101

Quarterfinals
Maryna Slutskaya (BLR)	000
Gülşah Kocatürk (TUR)	000
Jasmin Külbs (GER)	100
Santa Pakenytė (LTU)	000

Semifinals
Maryna Slutskaya (BLR)	000
Jasmin Külbs (GER)	100

=== Bottom half ===
Round of 32
Elisa Marchio (ITA)	100
Sandra Jablonskytė (LTU)	000

Round of 16
Émilie Andéol (FRA)	000
Katarzyna Furmanek (POL)	000
Iryna Kindzerska (UKR)	100
Elisa Marchio (ITA)	000
Svitlana Iaromka (UKR)	101
Sarah Adlington (GBR)	001
Larisa Cerić (BIH)	000
Belkıs Zehra Kaya (TUR)	101

Quarterfinals
Émilie Andéol (FRA)	000
Iryna Kindzerska (UKR)	000
Svitlana Iaromka (UKR)	000
Belkıs Zehra Kaya (TUR)	100

Semifinals
Émilie Andéol (FRA)	001
Belkıs Zehra Kaya (TUR)	000
