= 2019 World Judo Championships – Women's +78 kg =

Judo competition

Judo Women's +78 kg at the 2019 World Judo Championships
- Venue: Nippon Budokan
- Location: Tokyo, Japan
- Date: 31 August
- Competitors: 40 from 34 nations
- Total prize money: 57,000$

Medalists
gold medal	Akira Sone (1st title)	Japan
silver medal	Idalys Ortiz	Cuba
bronze medal	Kayra Sayit	Turkey
bronze medal	Sarah Asahina	Japan

Competition at external databases
- Links: IJF • JudoInside

The women's +78 kg competition at the 2019 World Judo Championships was held on 31 August 2019.

== Results ==
=== Finals ===
Semi-finals
(Cuba) Idalys Ortiz	01
(Brazil) Maria Suelen Altheman	00
(Turkey) Kayra Sayit	00
(Japan) Akira Sone	10

Final
(Cuba) Idalys Ortiz	00
(Japan) Akira Sone	10

=== Repechage ===
Repechage
(Brazil) Beatriz Souza	10
(Azerbaijan) Iryna Kindzerska	00

Third place
(Brazil) Beatriz Souza	00
(Turkey) Kayra Sayit	11

Repechage
(Japan) Sarah Asahina	10
(Bosnia and Herzegovina) Larisa Cerić	00

Third place
(Japan) Sarah Asahina	10
(Brazil) Maria Suelen Altheman	00

=== Pool A ===
First round
(Hungary) Mercedesz Szigetvári	10
(Ukraine) Yelyzaveta Kalanina	00

Second round
(Cuba) Idalys Ortiz	10
(Senegal) Monica Sagna	00
(Cameroon) Hortence Atangana	10
(India) Tulika Maan	00
(Brazil) Beatriz Souza	10
(United States) Nina Cutro-Kelly	00
(Myanmar) Khin Myo Thu	00
(Hungary) Mercedesz Szigetvári	10

Third round
(Cuba) Idalys Ortiz	10
(Cameroon) Hortence Atangana	00
(Brazil) Beatriz Souza	10
(Hungary) Mercedesz Szigetvári	00

Quarterfinals
(Cuba) Idalys Ortiz	10
(Brazil) Beatriz Souza	00

=== Pool B ===
First round
(Chinese Taipei) Tsai Jia-wen	00
(China) Wang Yan	10
(United Kingdom) Sarah Adlington	00
(Netherlands) Tessie Savelkouls	01

Second round
(Brazil) Maria Suelen Altheman	10
(China) Wang Yan	00
(Puerto Rico) Melissa Mojica	11
(Czech Republic) Markéta Paulusová	00
(Azerbaijan) Iryna Kindzerska	10
(Netherlands) Tessie Savelkouls	00
(Lithuania) Sandra Jablonskytė	00
(Tunisia) Nihel Cheikh	10

Third round
(Brazil) Maria Suelen Altheman	10
(Puerto Rico) Melissa Mojica	00
(Azerbaijan) Iryna Kindzerska	10
(Tunisia) Nihel Cheikh	00

Quarterfinals
(Brazil) Maria Suelen Altheman	10
(Azerbaijan) Iryna Kindzerska	00

=== Pool C ===
First round
(Philippines) Ryouko Salinas	00
(Portugal) Rochele Nunes	10
(Lithuania) Santa Pakenytė	10
(United States) Mackenzie Williams	00

Second round
(Japan) Sarah Asahina	11
(Portugal) Rochele Nunes	01
(France) Anne Fatoumata M'Bairo	00
(Serbia) Milica Žabić	10
(Belarus) Maryna Slutskaya	10
(Lithuania) Santa Pakenytė	00
(Kazakhstan) Nazgul Maratova	00
(Turkey) Kayra Sayit	10

Third round
(Japan) Sarah Asahina	10
(Serbia) Milica Žabić	00
(Belarus) Maryna Slutskaya	00
(Turkey) Kayra Sayit	10

Quarterfinals
(Japan) Sarah Asahina	00
(Turkey) Kayra Sayit	10

=== Pool D ===
First round
(Croatia) Ivana Šutalo	00
(Germany) Jasmin Külbs	10
(South Korea) Han Mi-jin	10
(Nicaragua) Izayana Marenco	00

Second round
(Bosnia and Herzegovina) Larisa Cerić	10
(Germany) Jasmin Külbs	00
(Argentina) Amanda Bredeston	00
(Ukraine) Galyna Tarasova	10
(Japan) Akira Sone	10
(South Korea) Han Mi-jin	00
(Israel) Raz Hershko	00
(Slovenia) Anamari Velenšek	10

Third round
(Bosnia and Herzegovina) Larisa Cerić	10
(Ukraine) Galyna Tarasova	00
(Japan) Akira Sone	10
(Slovenia) Anamari Velenšek	00

Quarterfinals
(Bosnia and Herzegovina) Larisa Cerić	00
(Japan) Akira Sone	10

== Prize money ==
The sums listed bring the total prizes awarded to 57,000$ for the individual event.

Medal	Total	Judoka	Coach
Gold	26,000$	20,800$	5,200$
Silver	15,000$	12,000$	3,000$
Bronze	8,000$	6,400$	1,600$
