= Judo at the 2009 Summer Universiade =

Judo competition

Judo Judo at the 2009 Summer Universiade
- Location: Belgrade, Serbia
- Dates: 7–10 July 2009

Medalists
gold medal	Japan (6th title)
silver medal	South Korea
bronze medal	France

Champions
- Men's team: South Korea (4th title)
- Women's team: Japan (3rd title)

Competition at external databases
- Links: EJU • JudoInside

The Judo competition in the 2009 Summer Universiade were held in Belgrade, Serbia from 7 to 10 July 2009.

== Medal overview ==
=== Men's events ===
Event	Gold	Silver	Bronze
Under 60 kg	Jeroen Mooren (NED)	Bakytzhan Turebekov (KAZ)	Artur Srapyan (ARM)
Under 60 kg	Jeroen Mooren (NED)	Bakytzhan Turebekov (KAZ)	Masaaki Fukuoka (JPN)
Under 66 kg	Masashi Ebinuma (JPN)	Hambardzum Tonoyan (ARM)	David Dubsky (CZE)
Under 66 kg	Masashi Ebinuma (JPN)	Hambardzum Tonoyan (ARM)	Martin Ivanov (BUL)
Under 73 kg	Wang Ki-Chun (KOR)	Attila Ungvari (HUN)	Nyam-Ochir Sainjargal (MGL)
Under 73 kg	Wang Ki-Chun (KOR)	Attila Ungvari (HUN)	Joachim Bottieau (BEL)
Under 81 kg	Ramin Gurbanov (AZE)	Kim Mim Gyu (KOR)	Łukasz Błach (POL)
Under 81 kg	Ramin Gurbanov (AZE)	Kim Mim Gyu (KOR)	Jaromír Ježek (CZE)
Under 90 kg	Dmitrij Gerasimenko (RUS)	Lukasz Jacek Kolesnik (POL)	Lee Kyu Won (KOR)
Under 90 kg	Dmitrij Gerasimenko (RUS)	Lukasz Jacek Kolesnik (POL)	Romain Buffet (FRA)
Under 100 kg	Cyrille Maret (FRA)	Daisuke Kobayashi (JPN)	Sergey Samoylovich (RUS)
Under 100 kg	Cyrille Maret (FRA)	Daisuke Kobayashi (JPN)	Yauhen Biadulin (BLR)
Over 100 kg	Luuk Verbij (NED)	Daiki Kamikawa (JPN)	Andrey Volkov (RUS)
Over 100 kg	Luuk Verbij (NED)	Daiki Kamikawa (JPN)	Barna Bor (HUN)
Open	Kim Sung Min (KOR)	Grzegorz Michal Eitel (POL)	Dmitry Sterkhov (RUS)
Open	Kim Sung Min (KOR)	Grzegorz Michal Eitel (POL)	Kazuhiko Takahashi (JPN)
Team	South Korea (KOR); Choi Gwang-Hyeon; Cho Jun Ho; Wang Ki-Chun; Kim Mim Gyu; Lee Kyu Won; Sin Kyeong-Seob; Kim Soo-Whan; Kim Sung Min	Russia (RUS); Kamal Khan-Magomedov; Dmitrij Gerasimenko; Dmitry Sterkhov; Andrey Volkov; Evgeny Kudyakov; Azamat Sidakov; Sergey Samoylovich; Alibek Bashkaev	Kazakhstan (KAZ); Bakytzhan Turebekov; Madi Kurymbayem; Yerzhan Shynkeyev; Beibit Istybayev; Duman Aldiyev; Assylbek Alkey; Damir Issakmanov
Team	South Korea (KOR); Choi Gwang-Hyeon; Cho Jun Ho; Wang Ki-Chun; Kim Mim Gyu; Lee Kyu Won; Sin Kyeong-Seob; Kim Soo-Whan; Kim Sung Min	Russia (RUS); Kamal Khan-Magomedov; Dmitrij Gerasimenko; Dmitry Sterkhov; Andrey Volkov; Evgeny Kudyakov; Azamat Sidakov; Sergey Samoylovich; Alibek Bashkaev	Japan (JPN); Kazuhiko Takahashi; Daiki Kamikawa; Daisuke Kobayashi; Yasuhiro Ebi; Yasuhiro Awano; Masashi Ebinuma; Masaaki Fukuoka; Masashi Nishiyama

=== Women's events ===
Event	Gold	Silver	Bronze
Under 48 kg	Haruna Asami (JPN)	Urantsetseg Munkhbat (MGL)	Eva Csernoviczki (HUN)
Under 48 kg	Haruna Asami (JPN)	Urantsetseg Munkhbat (MGL)	Chung Jung-Yeon (KOR)
Under 52 kg	Laura Goméz (ESP)	Delphine Delsalle (FRA)	Liu Yan (CHN)
Under 52 kg	Laura Goméz (ESP)	Delphine Delsalle (FRA)	Yanet Bermoy (CUB)
Under 57 kg	Malgorzata Bielak (POL)	Sarah Loko (FRA)	He Cancan (CHN)
Under 57 kg	Malgorzata Bielak (POL)	Sarah Loko (FRA)	Michelle Diemeer (NED)
Under 63 kg	Wang Chin-Fang (TPE)	Miki Tanaka (JPN)	Irina Gromova (RUS)
Under 63 kg	Wang Chin-Fang (TPE)	Miki Tanaka (JPN)	Ana Cachola (POR)
Under 70 kg	Yoriko Kunihara (JPN)	Pürevjargalyn Lkhamdegd (MGL)	Hwang Ye-Sul (KOR)
Under 70 kg	Yoriko Kunihara (JPN)	Pürevjargalyn Lkhamdegd (MGL)	Gemma Jeanette Gibbons (GBR)
Under 78 kg	Géraldine Mentouopou (FRA)	Jeong Gyeong-Mi (KOR)	Kaliema Antomachin (CUB)
Under 78 kg	Géraldine Mentouopou (FRA)	Jeong Gyeong-Mi (KOR)	Katarzyna Furmanek (POL)
Over 78 kg	Qin Qian (CHN)	Lee Jung-Eun (KOR)	Svitlana Iaromka (UKR)
Over 78 kg	Qin Qian (CHN)	Lee Jung-Eun (KOR)	Gulzhan Issanova (KAZ)
Open	Zhang Jie (CHN)	Kanae Yamabe (JPN)	Belkız Zehra Kaya (TUR)
Open	Zhang Jie (CHN)	Kanae Yamabe (JPN)	Kim Na-Young (KOR)
Team	Japan (JPN); Kanae Yamabe; Megumi Tachimoto; Hitomi Ikeda; Yoriko Kunihara; Miki Tanaka; Makiko Otomo; Chiho Kagaya; Haruna Asami	South Korea (KOR); Chung Jung-Yeon; Jung Eun-Jung; Park Hyo-Ju; Joung Da-Woon; Hwang Ye-Sul; Jeong Gyeong-Mi; Kim Na-Young; Lee Jung-Eun	France (FRA); Sarah Loko; Marielle Pruvost; Géraldine Mentouopou; Aurore Urani Climence; Maya Thoyer; Rebecca Ramanich; Delphine Delsalle
Team	Japan (JPN); Kanae Yamabe; Megumi Tachimoto; Hitomi Ikeda; Yoriko Kunihara; Miki Tanaka; Makiko Otomo; Chiho Kagaya; Haruna Asami	South Korea (KOR); Chung Jung-Yeon; Jung Eun-Jung; Park Hyo-Ju; Joung Da-Woon; Hwang Ye-Sul; Jeong Gyeong-Mi; Kim Na-Young; Lee Jung-Eun	China (CHN); Ye Meixin; He Cancan; Liu Yan; Lin Meiling; Zhang Jie; Qin Qian

== Medal table ==
Rank	Nation	Gold	Silver	Bronze	Total
1	Japan (JPN)	4	4	3	11
2	South Korea (KOR)	3	4	4	11
3	France (FRA)	2	2	2	6
4	China (CHN)	2	0	3	5
5	Netherlands (NED)	2	0	1	3
6	Poland (POL)	1	2	2	5
7	Russia (RUS)	1	1	4	6
8	Azerbaijan (AZE)	1	0	0	1
8	Chinese Taipei (TPE)	1	0	0	1
8	Spain (ESP)	1	0	0	1
11	Mongolia (MGL)	0	2	1	3
12	Hungary (HUN)	0	1	2	3
12	Kazakhstan (KAZ)	0	1	2	3
14	Armenia (ARM)	0	1	1	2
15	Cuba (CUB)	0	0	2	2
15	Czech Republic (CZE)	0	0	2	2
17	Belarus (BLR)	0	0	1	1
17	Belgium (BEL)	0	0	1	1
17	Bulgaria (BUL)	0	0	1	1
17	Great Britain (GBR)	0	0	1	1
17	Portugal (POR)	0	0	1	1
17	Turkey (TUR)	0	0	1	1
17	Ukraine (UKR)	0	0	1	1
Totals (23 entries)		18	18	36	72
