= 2016 European Judo Championships =

Judo competition

2016 Judo European Judo Championships
- Venue: Tatneft Arena
- Location: Kazan, Russia
- Dates: 21–24 April 2016
- Competitors: 394 from 46 nations

Champions
- Men's team: Georgia (8th title)
- Women's team: Poland (1st title)

Competition at external databases
- Links: IJF • JudoInside

The 2016 European Judo Championships were held in Kazan, Russia, on 21–24 April 2016, at the TatNeft Arena.

== Medal overview ==
=== Men ===
Event	Gold	Silver	Bronze
−60 kg	(France) Walide Khyar	(Azerbaijan) Orkhan Safarov	(Armenia) Hovhannes Davtyan (Italy) Elios Manzi
−66 kg	(Georgia (country)) Vazha Margvelashvili	(United Kingdom) Colin Oates	(Russia) Arsen Galstyan (Italy) Fabio Basile
−73 kg	(Azerbaijan) Rustam Orujov	(Georgia (country)) Lasha Shavdatuashvili	(Slovenia) Rok Drakšič (Georgia (country)) Nugzar Tatalashvili
−81 kg	(Russia) Khasan Khalmurzaev	(Georgia (country)) Avtandil Tchrikishvili	(Bulgaria) Ivaylo Ivanov (Sweden) Robin Pacek
−90 kg	(Georgia (country)) Varlam Liparteliani	(Hungary) Krisztián Tóth	(Poland) Piotr Kuczera (Sweden) Marcus Nyman
−100 kg	(Netherlands) Henk Grol	(Belgium) Toma Nikiforov	(Netherlands) Michael Korrel (Estonia) Grigori Minaškin
+100 kg	(France) Teddy Riner	(Israel) Or Sasson	(Georgia (country)) Levani Matiashvili (Romania) Daniel Natea
Teams	Georgia; Vazha Margvelashvili; Amiran Papinashvili; Nugzari Tatalashvili; Lasha Shavdatuashvili; Avtandili Tchrikishvili; Giorgi Papunashvili; Varlam Liparteliani; Paata Gviniashvili; Levani Matiashvili; Adam Okruashvili	Russia; Anzaur Ardanov; Arsen Galstyan; Zelimkhan Ozdoev; Uali Kurzhev; Stanislav Semenov; Khasan Khalmurzaev; Said Emi Zhambekov; Magomed Magomedov; Adlan Bisultanov; Andrey Volkov	Poland; Aleksander Beta; Paweł Zagrodnik; Damian Szwarnowiecki; Łukasz Błach; Jakub Kubieniec; Patryk Ciechomski; Piotr Kuczera; Kamil Grabowski; Maciej Sarnacki Azerbaijan; Tarlan Karimov; Vugar Shirinli; Fagan Guluzada; Rustam Orujov; Rustam Alimli; Shahin Gahramanov; Mammadali Mehdiyev; Elkhan Mammadov; Ushangi Kokauri

=== Women ===
Event	Gold	Silver	Bronze
−48 kg	(Belgium) Charline Van Snick	(Hungary) Éva Csernoviczki	(Romania) Monica Ungureanu (Turkey) Dilara Lokmanhekim
−52 kg	(Kosovo) Majlinda Kelmendi	(France) Priscilla Gneto	(Russia) Yulia Kazarina (Romania) Andreea Chitu
−57 kg	(France) Automne Pavia	(Bulgaria) Ivelina Ilieva	(Israel) Timna Nelson-Levy (Kosovo) Nora Gjakova
−63 kg	(Slovenia) Tina Trstenjak	(Austria) Kathrin Unterwurzacher	(Netherlands) Anicka van Emden (Russia) Ekaterina Valkova
−70 kg	(France) Gévrise Émane	(Georgia (country)) Esther Stam	(France) Fanny Estelle Posvite (Hungary) Szabina Gercsák
−78 kg	(France) Audrey Tcheuméo	(Netherlands) Guusje Steenhuis	(Germany) Luise Malzahn (United Kingdom) Natalie Powell
+78 kg	(Turkey) Kayra Sayit	(Ukraine) Svitlana Iaromka	(Turkey) Belkıs Zehra Kaya (Germany) Jasmin Külbs
Teams	Poland; Agata Perenc; Karolina Pieńkowska; Arleta Podolak; Anna Borowska; Agata Ozdoba; Karolina Tałach; Katarzyna Klys; Katarzyna Furmanek; Anna Załęczna	Russia; Yulia Kazarina; Nataliya Komova; Daria Mezhetskaia; Tatiana Kazeniuk; Daria Davydova; Pari Surakatova; Irina Gazieva; Valentina Maltseva; Ksenia Chibisova; Vera Moskalyuk	Germany; Maria Ertl; Mareen Kräh; Theresa Stoll; Viola Wächter; Nadja Bazynski; Iljana Marzok; Laura Vargas Koch; Luise Malzahn; Carolin Weiß France; Astride Gneto; Lola Benarroche; Margaux Pinot; Mélissa Heleine; Madeleine Malonga

=== Medal table ===
* Host nation (Russia)

Rank	Nation	Gold	Silver	Bronze	Total
1	France	5	1	2	8
2	Georgia	3	3	2	8
3	Russia*	1	2	3	6
4	Netherlands	1	1	2	4
5	Azerbaijan	1	1	1	3
6	Belgium	1	1	0	2
7	Poland	1	0	2	3
7	Turkey	1	0	2	3
9	Kosovo	1	0	1	2
9	Slovenia	1	0	1	2
11	Hungary	0	2	1	3
12	Bulgaria	0	1	1	2
12	Great Britain	0	1	1	2
12	Israel	0	1	1	2
15	Austria	0	1	0	1
15	Ukraine	0	1	0	1
17	Germany	0	0	3	3
17	Romania	0	0	3	3
19	Italy	0	0	2	2
19	Sweden	0	0	2	2
21	Armenia	0	0	1	1
21	Estonia	0	0	1	1
Totals (22 entries)		16	16	32	64
