= Verbij =

Verbij is a surname. Notable people with the surname include:

- Kai Verbij (born 1994), Dutch speed skater
- Luuk Verbij (born 1986), Dutch judoka
