= Yu Song (judoka) =

Chinese judoka (born 1986)

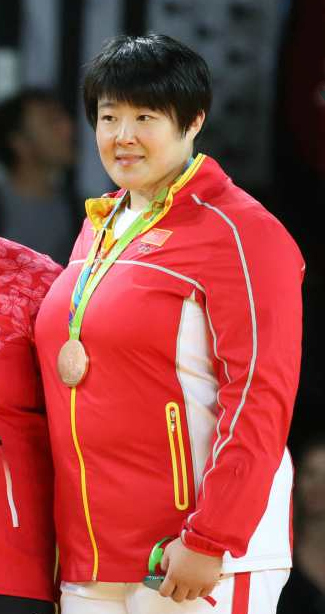
- Yu at the 2016 Olympics

Personal information
- Born: 6 August 1986 (age 39) Qingdao, China
- Occupation: Judoka
- Height: 182 cm (6 ft 0 in)
- Weight: 128 kg (282 lb)

Sport
- Country: China
- Sport: Judo
- Weight class: +78 kg
- Club: Shandong Province Team
- Coached by: Cheng Zhishan (national)

Achievements and titles
- Olympic Games: (bronze) (2016)
- World Champ.: (2015, 2017)
- Asian Champ.: (gold) (2015)
Medal record
Women's judo
Representing China
Olympic Games
Bronze medal – third place	2016 Rio de Janeiro	+78 kg
World Championships
Gold medal – first place	2015 Astana	+78 kg
Gold medal – first place	2017 Budapest	+78 kg
Asian Championships
Gold medal – first place	2015 Kuwait City	+78 kg
Silver medal – second place	2005 Tashkent	+78 kg
Bronze medal – third place	2005 Tashkent	Open
World Masters
Gold medal – first place	2013 Tyumen	+78 kg
Gold medal – first place	2015 Rabat	+78 kg
IJF Grand Slam
Gold medal – first place	2014 Abu Dhabi	+78 kg
Silver medal – second place	2016 Baku	+78 kg
Bronze medal – third place	2015 Tyumen	+78 kg
Bronze medal – third place	2015 Abu Dhabi	+78 kg
IJF Grand Prix
Gold medal – first place	2010 Qingdao	+78 kg
Gold medal – first place	2012 Qingdao	+78 kg
Gold medal – first place	2014 Zagreb	+78 kg
Gold medal – first place	2014 Qingdao	+78 kg
Gold medal – first place	2015 Tbilisi	+78 kg
Gold medal – first place	2015 Qingdao	+78 kg
Gold medal – first place	2016 Qingdao	+78 kg
Silver medal – second place	2009 Qingdao	+78 kg
Silver medal – second place	2011 Baku	+78 kg
Silver medal – second place	2016 Düsseldorf	+78 kg
Bronze medal – third place	2010 Abu Dhabi	+78 kg
Bronze medal – third place	2014 Düsseldorf	+78 kg
Bronze medal – third place	2015 Tashkent	+78 kg
Bronze medal – third place	2016 Budapest	+78 kg
Asian Junior Championships
Silver medal – second place	2005 Beirut	+78 kg
Silver medal – second place	2006 Jeju	+78 kg
Bronze medal – third place	2004 Doha	+78 kg
Summer Universiade
Silver medal – second place	2011 Shenzhen	Women's team

Profile at external databases
- IJF: 2114
- JudoInside.com: 34375
- Updated on 24 May 2023

Yu Song (Simplified Chinese:于 颂, born 6 August 1986) is a Chinese judoka. Competing in the over 78 kg category she won the World Championships in 2015 and 2017 and an Olympics bronze medal at the 2016 Summer Olympics. Yu is married to Zhang Maohong.
