= 2015 Judo Grand Prix Zagreb =

Judo competition

Judo 2015 Judo Grand Prix Zagreb
- Venue: Dom Sportova
- Location: Zagreb, Croatia
- Dates: 1–3 May 2015
- Competitors: 433 from 55 nations

Competition at external databases
- Links: IJF • EJU • JudoInside

The 2015 Judo Grand Prix Zagreb was held at the Dom Sportova in Zagreb, Croatia from 1 to 3 May 2015.

== Medal summary ==
=== Men's events ===
Event	Gold	Silver	Bronze
Extra-lightweight (−60 kg)	Hovhannes Davtyan (ARM)	Tobias Englmaier (GER)	Ganboldyn Kherlen (MGL)
Extra-lightweight (−60 kg)	Hovhannes Davtyan (ARM)	Tobias Englmaier (GER)	Francisco Garrigós (ESP)
Half-lightweight (−66 kg)	Georgii Zantaraia (UKR)	Sebastian Seidl (GER)	Golan Pollack (ISR)
Half-lightweight (−66 kg)	Georgii Zantaraia (UKR)	Sebastian Seidl (GER)	Sinan Sandal (TUR)
Lightweight (−73 kg)	Lasha Shavdatuashvili (GEO)	Khashbaataryn Tsagaanbaatar (MGL)	Sagi Muki (ISR)
Lightweight (−73 kg)	Lasha Shavdatuashvili (GEO)	Khashbaataryn Tsagaanbaatar (MGL)	Pierre Duprat (FRA)
Half-middleweight (−81 kg)	Szabolcs Krizsán (HUN)	László Csoknyai (HUN)	Frank de Wit (NED)
Half-middleweight (−81 kg)	Szabolcs Krizsán (HUN)	László Csoknyai (HUN)	Khasan Khalmurzaev (RUS)
Middleweight (−90 kg)	Krisztián Tóth (HUN)	Aaron Hildebrand (GER)	Guillaume Elmont (NED)
Middleweight (−90 kg)	Krisztián Tóth (HUN)	Aaron Hildebrand (GER)	Joakim Dvärby (SWE)
Half-heavyweight (−100 kg)	Dimitri Peters (GER)	Michael Korrel (NED)	Lukáš Krpálek (CZE)
Half-heavyweight (−100 kg)	Dimitri Peters (GER)	Michael Korrel (NED)	Jorge Fonseca (POR)
Heavyweight (+100 kg)	Iakiv Khammo (UKR)	Vlăduț Simionescu (ROU)	Roy Meyer (NED)
Heavyweight (+100 kg)	Iakiv Khammo (UKR)	Vlăduț Simionescu (ROU)	Matjaž Ceraj (SLO)

=== Women's events ===
Event	Gold	Silver	Bronze
Extra-lightweight (−48 kg)	Dilara Lokmanhekim (TUR)	Ebru Şahin (TUR)	Irina Dolgova (RUS)
Extra-lightweight (−48 kg)	Dilara Lokmanhekim (TUR)	Ebru Şahin (TUR)	Valentina Moscatt (ITA)
Half-lightweight (−52 kg)	Andreea Chițu (ROU)	Yulia Kazarina (RUS)	Distria Krasniqi (KOS)
Half-lightweight (−52 kg)	Andreea Chițu (ROU)	Yulia Kazarina (RUS)	Agata Perenc (POL)
Lightweight (−57 kg)	Nekoda Smythe-Davis (GBR)	Marti Malloy (USA)	Tina Zeltner (AUT)
Lightweight (−57 kg)	Nekoda Smythe-Davis (GBR)	Marti Malloy (USA)	Johanna Müller (GER)
Half-middleweight (−63 kg)	Tina Trstenjak (SLO)	Clarisse Agbegnenou (FRA)	Yarden Gerbi (ISR)
Half-middleweight (−63 kg)	Tina Trstenjak (SLO)	Clarisse Agbegnenou (FRA)	Edwige Gwend (ITA)
Middleweight (−70 kg)	Linda Bolder (ISR)	Sally Conway (GBR)	Kelita Zupancic (CAN)
Middleweight (−70 kg)	Linda Bolder (ISR)	Sally Conway (GBR)	Fanny Estelle Posvite (FRA)
Half-heavyweight (−78 kg)	Anamari Velenšek (SLO)	Viktoriya Turks (UKR)	Abigél Joó (HUN)
Half-heavyweight (−78 kg)	Anamari Velenšek (SLO)	Viktoriya Turks (UKR)	Daria Pogorzelec (POL)
Heavyweight (+78 kg)	Belkıs Zehra Kaya (TUR)	Tessie Savelkouls (NED)	Franziska Konitz (GER)
Heavyweight (+78 kg)	Belkıs Zehra Kaya (TUR)	Tessie Savelkouls (NED)	Jasmin Grabowski (GER)

Source Results

=== Medal table ===
* Host nation (Croatia)

Rank	Nation	Gold	Silver	Bronze	Total
1	Hungary (HUN)	2	1	1	4
1	Turkey (TUR)	2	1	1	4
3	Ukraine (UKR)	2	1	0	3
4	Slovenia (SLO)	2	0	1	3
5	Germany (GER)	1	3	3	7
6	Great Britain (GBR)	1	1	0	2
6	Romania (ROU)	1	1	0	2
8	Israel (ISR)	1	0	3	4
9	Armenia (ARM)	1	0	0	1
9	Georgia (GEO)	1	0	0	1
11	Netherlands (NED)	0	2	3	5
12	France (FRA)	0	1	2	3
12	Russia (RUS)	0	1	2	3
14	Mongolia (MGL)	0	1	1	2
15	United States (USA)	0	1	0	1
16	Italy (ITA)	0	0	2	2
16	Poland (POL)	0	0	2	2
18	Austria (AUT)	0	0	1	1
18	Canada (CAN)	0	0	1	1
18	Czech Republic (CZE)	0	0	1	1
18	Kosovo (KOS)	0	0	1	1
18	Portugal (POR)	0	0	1	1
18	Spain (ESP)	0	0	1	1
18	Sweden (SWE)	0	0	1	1
Totals (24 entries)		14	14	28	56
