= 2015 Judo Grand Prix Tbilisi =

Judo competition

Judo 2015 Judo Grand Prix Tbilisi
- Venue: Olympic Palace
- Location: Tbilisi, Georgia
- Dates: 20–22 March 2015
- Competitors: 345 from 42 nations

Competition at external databases
- Links: IJF • EJU • JudoInside

The 2015 Judo Grand Prix Tbilisi was held at the Olympic Palace in Tbilisi, Georgia from 20 to 22 March 2015.

== Medal summary ==
=== Men's events ===
Event	Gold	Silver	Bronze
Extra-lightweight (−60 kg)	Sharafuddin Lutfillaev (UZB)	Tobias Englmaier (GER)	Dashdavaagiin Amartüvshin (MGL)
Extra-lightweight (−60 kg)	Sharafuddin Lutfillaev (UZB)	Tobias Englmaier (GER)	Diyorbek Urozboev (UZB)
Half-lightweight (−66 kg)	Davaadorjiin Tömörkhüleg (MGL)	Baruch Shmailov (ISR)	Georgii Zantaraia (UKR)
Half-lightweight (−66 kg)	Davaadorjiin Tömörkhüleg (MGL)	Baruch Shmailov (ISR)	Tarlan Karimov (AZE)
Lightweight (−73 kg)	Rustam Orujov (AZE)	Dastan Ykybayev (KAZ)	Nugzar Tatalashvili (GEO)
Lightweight (−73 kg)	Rustam Orujov (AZE)	Dastan Ykybayev (KAZ)	Lasha Shavdatuashvili (GEO)
Half-middleweight (−81 kg)	Alan Khubetsov (RUS)	Ushangi Margiani (GEO)	Nyamsürengiin Dagvasüren (MGL)
Half-middleweight (−81 kg)	Alan Khubetsov (RUS)	Ushangi Margiani (GEO)	Sirazhudin Magomedov (RUS)
Middleweight (−90 kg)	Beka Gviniashvili (GEO)	Varlam Liparteliani (GEO)	Krisztián Tóth (HUN)
Middleweight (−90 kg)	Beka Gviniashvili (GEO)	Varlam Liparteliani (GEO)	Lkhagvasürengiin Otgonbaatar (MGL)
Half-heavyweight (−100 kg)	Elmar Gasimov (AZE)	Dimitri Peters (GER)	Jevgeņijs Borodavko (LAT)
Half-heavyweight (−100 kg)	Elmar Gasimov (AZE)	Dimitri Peters (GER)	Karl-Richard Frey (GER)
Heavyweight (+100 kg)	Levani Matiashvili (GEO)	Adam Okruashvili (GEO)	Aslan Kambiev (RUS)
Heavyweight (+100 kg)	Levani Matiashvili (GEO)	Adam Okruashvili (GEO)	Oleksandr Gordiienko (UKR)

=== Women's events ===
Event	Gold	Silver	Bronze
Extra-lightweight (−48 kg)	Maryna Cherniak (UKR)	Julia Figueroa (ESP)	Aurore Urani Climence (FRA)
Extra-lightweight (−48 kg)	Maryna Cherniak (UKR)	Julia Figueroa (ESP)	Ebru Şahin (TUR)
Half-lightweight (−52 kg)	Jaana Sundberg (FIN)	Ilse Heylen (BEL)	Laura Gómez (ESP)
Half-lightweight (−52 kg)	Jaana Sundberg (FIN)	Ilse Heylen (BEL)	Odette Giuffrida (ITA)
Lightweight (−57 kg)	Dorjsürengiin Sumiyaa (MGL)	Vlora Beđeti (SLO)	Miryam Roper (GER)
Lightweight (−57 kg)	Dorjsürengiin Sumiyaa (MGL)	Vlora Beđeti (SLO)	Viola Wächter (GER)
Half-middleweight (−63 kg)	Tina Trstenjak (SLO)	Tsedevsürengiin Mönkhzayaa (MGL)	Edwige Gwend (ITA)
Half-middleweight (−63 kg)	Tina Trstenjak (SLO)	Tsedevsürengiin Mönkhzayaa (MGL)	Martyna Trajdos (GER)
Middleweight (−70 kg)	Szaundra Diedrich (GER)	Gévrise Émane (FRA)	Marie-Ève Gahié (FRA)
Middleweight (−70 kg)	Szaundra Diedrich (GER)	Gévrise Émane (FRA)	Linda Bolder (ISR)
Half-heavyweight (−78 kg)	Kayla Harrison (USA)	Audrey Tcheuméo (FRA)	Sol Kyong (PRK)
Half-heavyweight (−78 kg)	Kayla Harrison (USA)	Audrey Tcheuméo (FRA)	Kerstin Thiele (GER)
Heavyweight (+78 kg)	Yu Song (CHN)	Svitlana Iaromka (UKR)	Franziska Konitz (GER)
Heavyweight (+78 kg)	Yu Song (CHN)	Svitlana Iaromka (UKR)	Émilie Andéol (FRA)

Source Results

=== Medal table ===
* Host nation (Georgia)

Rank	Nation	Gold	Silver	Bronze	Total
1	Georgia (GEO)*	2	3	2	7
2	Mongolia (MGL)	2	1	3	6
3	Azerbaijan (AZE)	2	0	1	3
4	Germany (GER)	1	2	6	9
5	Ukraine (UKR)	1	1	2	4
6	Slovenia (SLO)	1	1	0	2
7	Russia (RUS)	1	0	2	3
8	Uzbekistan (UZB)	1	0	1	2
9	China (CHN)	1	0	0	1
9	Finland (FIN)	1	0	0	1
9	United States (USA)	1	0	0	1
12	France (FRA)	0	2	3	5
13	Israel (ISR)	0	1	1	2
13	Spain (ESP)	0	1	1	2
15	Belgium (BEL)	0	1	0	1
15	Kazakhstan (KAZ)	0	1	0	1
17	Italy (ITA)	0	0	2	2
18	Hungary (HUN)	0	0	1	1
18	Latvia (LAT)	0	0	1	1
18	North Korea (PRK)	0	0	1	1
18	Turkey (TUR)	0	0	1	1
Totals (21 entries)		14	14	28	56
