= Sharafuddin Lutfillaev =

Uzbekistani judoka (born 1990)

Personal information
- Nickname: Sharof
- Nationality: Uzbekistani
- Born: 9 September 1990 (age 35)
- Occupation: Judoka

Sport
- Country: Uzbekistan
- Sport: Judo
- Weight class: –60 kg

Achievements and titles
- Olympic Games: R16 (2020)
- World Champ.: (silver) (2019)
- Asian Champ.: (bronze) (2015)
Medal record
Men's judo
Representing Uzbekistan
World Championships
Silver medal – second place	2019 Tokyo	‍–‍60 kg
Asian Championships
Bronze medal – third place	2015 Kuwait City	‍–‍60 kg
World Masters
Bronze medal – third place	2015 Rabat	‍–‍60 kg
Bronze medal – third place	2017 Saint Petersburg	‍–‍60 kg
Bronze medal – third place	2019 Qingdao	‍–‍60 kg
IJF Grand Slam
Silver medal – second place	2017 Paris	‍–‍60 kg
Silver medal – second place	2018 Paris	‍–‍60 kg
Bronze medal – third place	2014 Baku	‍–‍60 kg
Bronze medal – third place	2015 Paris	‍–‍60 kg
Bronze medal – third place	2017 Abu Dhabi	‍–‍60 kg
Bronze medal – third place	2018 Abu Dhabi	‍–‍60 kg
IJF Grand Prix
Gold medal – first place	2013 Tashkent	‍–‍60 kg
Gold medal – first place	2015 Tbilisi	‍–‍60 kg
Gold medal – first place	2015 Samsun	‍–‍60 kg
Gold medal – first place	2019 Marrakesh	‍–‍60 kg
Gold medal – first place	2019 Zagreb	‍–‍60 kg
Silver medal – second place	2013 Abu Dhabi	‍–‍60 kg
Silver medal – second place	2015 Tashkent	‍–‍60 kg
Bronze medal – third place	2015 Budapest	‍–‍60 kg
Bronze medal – third place	2015 Qingdao	‍–‍60 kg
Bronze medal – third place	2016 Almaty	‍–‍60 kg
Bronze medal – third place	2016 Budapest	‍–‍60 kg
Bronze medal – third place	2016 Tashkent	‍–‍60 kg
Bronze medal – third place	2017 Tashkent	‍–‍60 kg
Bronze medal – third place	2019 Tbilisi	‍–‍60 kg

Profile at external databases
- IJF: 9293
- JudoInside.com: 80506
- Updated on 23 May 2023

Sharafuddin Lutfillaev (born 9 September 1990) is an Uzbekistani judoka who competes in the –60 kg weight category. He has participated in various international judo tournaments and earned medals in significant competitions, including the World Championships and Asian Championships.

== Career achievements ==
He won a medal at the 2019 World Judo Championships.

== Personal life ==
Sharafuddin Lutfillaev is the first judoka in the Uzbekistan to have NFT. Lutfillaev's official NFT was released in April 2022. The NFT was created to represent his achievements in judo.
