= Judo at the 2016 Summer Olympics – Women's +78 kg =

Women's +78 kg at the Games of the XXXI Olympiad
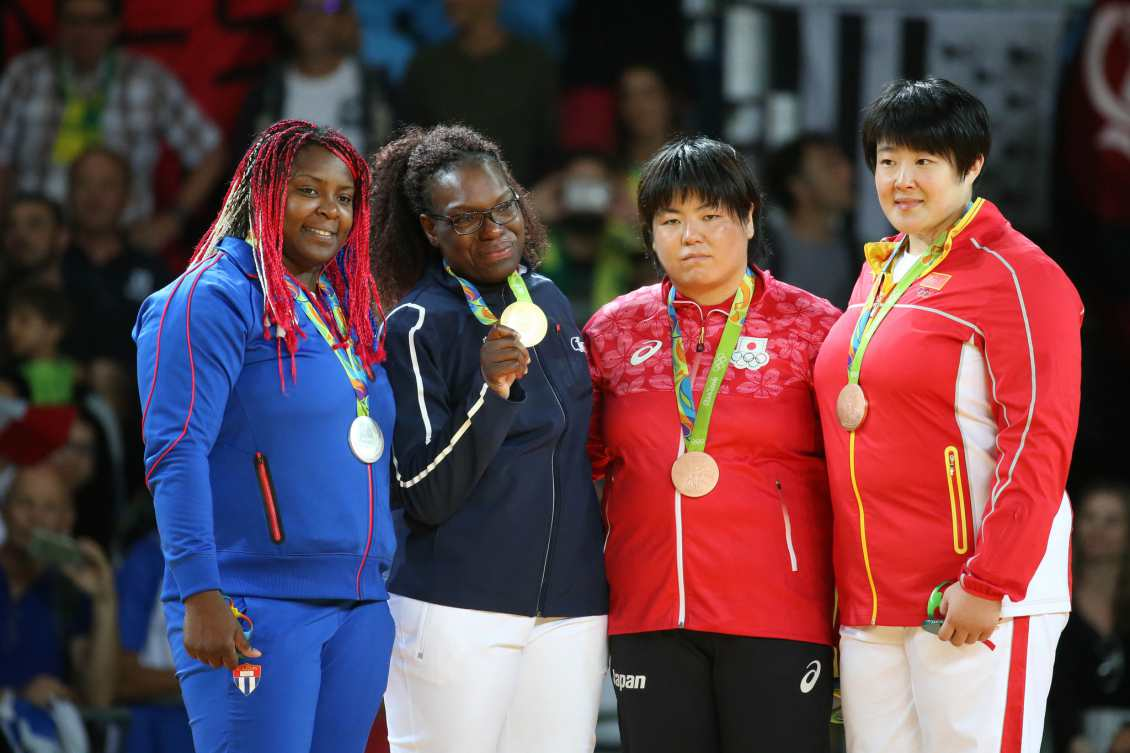
- Medalists
- Venue: Carioca Arena 2
- Date: 12 August 2016
- Competitors: 17 from 17 nations

Medalists
1st place, gold medalist(s)		Émilie Andéol	France
2nd place, silver medalist(s)		Idalys Ortiz	Cuba
3rd place, bronze medalist(s)		Kanae Yamabe	Japan
3rd place, bronze medalist(s)		Yu Song	China

The women's +78 kg competition in judo at the 2016 Summer Olympics in Rio de Janeiro was held on 12 August at the Carioca Arena 2.

The gold and silver medals were determined by a single-elimination tournament, with the winner of the final taking gold and the loser receiving silver. Judo events awarded two bronze medals. Quarterfinal losers competed in a repechage match for the right to face a semifinal loser for a bronze medal (that is, the judokas defeated in quarterfinals A and B competed against each other, with the winner of that match facing the semifinal loser from the other half of the bracket).

The medals for the competition were presented by Patrick Joseph Hickey, Ireland, member of the International Olympic Committee and the gifts were presented by Zhou Jinqiang, International Judo Federation executive committee member.

== Results ==
=== Finals ===
Semi-finals
Yu Song (CHN)	000
Émilie Andéol (FRA)	100
Idalys Ortiz (CUB)	001
Kanae Yamabe (JPN)	000

Final
Émilie Andéol (FRA)	100
Idalys Ortiz (CUB)	000

=== Repechages ===
Repechage		Bronze medal
Kayra Sayit (TUR)	100
Nihal Chikhrouhou (TUN)	000	Kayra Sayit (TUR)	000
		Kanae Yamabe (JPN)	010

Repechage		Bronze medal
Kim Min-jung (KOR)	102
Tessie Savelkouls (NED)	000	Kim Min-jung (KOR)	000
		Yu Song (CHN)	100

=== Pool A ===
First round	Second round		Quarterfinals
	Yu Song (CHN)	100
	Sonia Asselah (ALG)	000
			Yu Song (CHN)	111
			Kayra Sayit (TUR)	000
	Kayra Sayit (TUR)	102
	Melissa Mojica (PUR)	000

=== Pool B ===
First round	Second round		Quarterfinals
	Émilie Andéol (FRA)	000
	Vanessa Zambotti (MEX)	000
			Émilie Andéol (FRA)	000
			Nihal Chikhrouhou (TUN)	000
	Nihal Chikhrouhou (TUN)	000
	Larisa Cerić (BIH)	000

=== Pool C ===
First round		Second round		Quarterfinals
		Idalys Ortiz (CUB)	100
Ksenia Chibisova (RUS)	101	Ksenia Chibisova (RUS)	000
Jasmin Külbs (GER)	000			Idalys Ortiz (CUB)	101
				Kim Min-jung (KOR)	000
		Kim Min-jung (KOR)	001
		Maria Suelen Altheman (BRA)	000

=== Pool D ===
First round	Second round		Quarterfinals
	Kanae Yamabe (JPN)	100
	Santa Pakenytė (LTU)	000
			Kanae Yamabe (JPN)	101
			Tessie Savelkouls (NED)	000
	Svitlana Iaromka (UKR)	000
	Tessie Savelkouls (NED)	101
