= 2013 Judo Grand Prix Qingdao =

Judo competition

Judo 2013 Judo Grand Prix Qingdao
- Location: Qingdao, China
- Dates: 31 October – 1 November 2013
- Competitors: 161 from 13 nations

Competition at external databases
- Links: IJF • JudoInside

The 2013 Judo Grand Prix Qingdao was held in Qingdao, China, from 31 October to 1 November 2013.

== Medal summary ==
=== Men's events ===
Event	Gold	Silver	Bronze
Extra-lightweight (−60 kg)	Choi In-hyuk (KOR)	Ganboldyn Kherlen (MGL)	Tobias Englmaier (GER)
Extra-lightweight (−60 kg)	Choi In-hyuk (KOR)	Ganboldyn Kherlen (MGL)	Huang Sheng-ting (TPE)
Half-lightweight (−66 kg)	Alim Gadanov (RUS)	Davaadorjiin Tömörkhüleg (MGL)	Kamal Khan-Magomedov (RUS)
Half-lightweight (−66 kg)	Alim Gadanov (RUS)	Davaadorjiin Tömörkhüleg (MGL)	Ma Duanbin (CHN)
Lightweight (−73 kg)	Igor Wandtke (GER)	Kim Yong-jeong (KOR)	Eduardo Barbosa (BRA)
Lightweight (−73 kg)	Igor Wandtke (GER)	Kim Yong-jeong (KOR)	Victor Scvortov (UAE)
Half-middleweight (−81 kg)	Sergiu Toma (UAE)	Sven Maresch (GER)	Arsen Pshmakhov (RUS)
Half-middleweight (−81 kg)	Sergiu Toma (UAE)	Sven Maresch (GER)	Vinicius Panini (BRA)
Middleweight (−90 kg)	Murat Gasiev (RUS)	Kirill Voprosov (RUS)	Aaron Hildebrand (GER)
Middleweight (−90 kg)	Murat Gasiev (RUS)	Kirill Voprosov (RUS)	Marc Odenthal (GER)
Half-heavyweight (−100 kg)	Karl-Richard Frey (GER)	Zafar Makhmadov (RUS)	Adlan Bisultanov (RUS)
Half-heavyweight (−100 kg)	Karl-Richard Frey (GER)	Zafar Makhmadov (RUS)	Rafael Buzacarini (BRA)
Heavyweight (+100 kg)	Zhang Lei (CHN)	Gabriel Santos (BRA)	Gi Geun-bae (KOR)
Heavyweight (+100 kg)	Zhang Lei (CHN)	Gabriel Santos (BRA)	Liu Jian (CHN)

=== Women's events ===
Event	Gold	Silver	Bronze
Extra-lightweight (−48 kg)	Alesya Kuznetsova (RUS)	Wu Shugen (CHN)	Lusine Avakyan (RUS)
Extra-lightweight (−48 kg)	Alesya Kuznetsova (RUS)	Wu Shugen (CHN)	Kay Kraus (GER)
Half-lightweight (−52 kg)	Natalia Kuziutina (RUS)	Romy Tarangul (GER)	Yulia Kazarina (RUS)
Half-lightweight (−52 kg)	Natalia Kuziutina (RUS)	Romy Tarangul (GER)	Milena Mendes (BRA)
Lightweight (−57 kg)	Corina Căprioriu (ROU)	Rafaela Silva (BRA)	Irina Zabludina (RUS)
Lightweight (−57 kg)	Corina Căprioriu (ROU)	Rafaela Silva (BRA)	Tamires Crude (BRA)
Half-middleweight (−63 kg)	Martyna Trajdos (GER)	Li Jie (CHN)	Claudia Ahrens (GER)
Half-middleweight (−63 kg)	Martyna Trajdos (GER)	Li Jie (CHN)	Cuijuan Shi (CHN)
Middleweight (−70 kg)	Chen Fei (CHN)	Jia Zhao (CHN)	Ekaterina Denisenkova (RUS)
Middleweight (−70 kg)	Chen Fei (CHN)	Jia Zhao (CHN)	Irina Gazieva (RUS)
Half-heavyweight (−78 kg)	Zhang Jie (CHN)	Anastasiya Dmitrieva (RUS)	Li Xin (CHN)
Half-heavyweight (−78 kg)	Zhang Jie (CHN)	Anastasiya Dmitrieva (RUS)	Wang Szu-chu (TPE)
Heavyweight (+78 kg)	Qin Qian (CHN)	Ma Sisi (CHN)	Ksenia Chibisova (RUS)
Heavyweight (+78 kg)	Qin Qian (CHN)	Ma Sisi (CHN)	Jasmin Kuelbs (GER)

Source Results

=== Medal table ===
* Host nation (China)

Rank	Nation	Gold	Silver	Bronze	Total
1	China (CHN)*	4	4	4	12
2	Russia (RUS)	4	3	9	16
3	Germany (GER)	3	2	6	11
4	South Korea (KOR)	1	1	1	3
5	United Arab Emirates (UAE)	1	0	1	2
6	Romania (ROU)	1	0	0	1
7	Brazil (BRA)	0	2	5	7
8	Mongolia (MGL)	0	2	0	2
9	Chinese Taipei (TPE)	0	0	2	2
Totals (9 entries)		14	14	28	56
