= 2013 Judo Grand Prix Rijeka =

Judo competition

Judo 2013 Judo Grand Prix Rijeka
- Location: Rijeka, Croatia
- Dates: 14–15 September 2013
- Competitors: 204 from 36 nations

Competition at external databases
- Links: IJF • JudoInside

The 2013 Judo Grand Prix Rijeka was held in Rijeka, Croatia from 14 to 15 September 2013.

== Medal summary ==
=== Men's events ===
Event	Gold	Silver	Bronze
Extra-lightweight (−60 kg)	Beslan Mudranov (RUS)	Sofiane Milous (FRA)	Łukasz Kiełbasiński (POL)
Extra-lightweight (−60 kg)	Beslan Mudranov (RUS)	Sofiane Milous (FRA)	Sérgio Pessoa (CAN)
Half-lightweight (−66 kg)	Denis Lavrentiev (RUS)	Sergiy Pliyev (UKR)	Choi Gwang-hyeon (KOR)
Half-lightweight (−66 kg)	Denis Lavrentiev (RUS)	Sergiy Pliyev (UKR)	Colin Oates (GBR)
Lightweight (−73 kg)	Bang Gui-man (KOR)	Rok Drakšič (SLO)	Aleksey Astafiev (RUS)
Lightweight (−73 kg)	Bang Gui-man (KOR)	Rok Drakšič (SLO)	Christopher Völk (GER)
Half-middleweight (−81 kg)	Szabolcs Krizsán (HUN)	Carlos Luz (POR)	Maxim Buga (RUS)
Half-middleweight (−81 kg)	Szabolcs Krizsán (HUN)	Carlos Luz (POR)	Lee Seung-su (KOR)
Middleweight (−90 kg)	Domenik Wenzinger (SUI)	Giuliano Loporchio (ITA)	Ciril Grossklaus (SUI)
Middleweight (−90 kg)	Domenik Wenzinger (SUI)	Giuliano Loporchio (ITA)	Alon Sasson (ISR)
Half-heavyweight (−100 kg)	Karl-Richard Frey (GER)	Michal Horák (CZE)	Flavio Orlik (SUI)
Half-heavyweight (−100 kg)	Karl-Richard Frey (GER)	Michal Horák (CZE)	Martin Pacek (SWE)
Heavyweight (+100 kg)	Marko Radulović (MNE)	Jean-Sébastien Bonvoisin (FRA)	Sergey Andreev (RUS)
Heavyweight (+100 kg)	Marko Radulović (MNE)	Jean-Sébastien Bonvoisin (FRA)	Soslan Bostanov (RUS)

=== Women's events ===
Event	Gold	Silver	Bronze
Extra-lightweight (−48 kg)	Scarlett Gabrielli (FRA)	Kay Kraus (GER)	Ewa Konieczny (POL)
Half-lightweight (−52 kg)	Mareen Kräh (GER)	Ilse Heylen (BEL)	Pénélope Bonna (FRA)
Half-lightweight (−52 kg)	Mareen Kräh (GER)	Ilse Heylen (BEL)	Joana Ramos (POR)
Lightweight (−57 kg)	Miryam Roper (GER)	Telma Monteiro (POR)	Catherine Beauchemin-Pinard (CAN)
Lightweight (−57 kg)	Miryam Roper (GER)	Telma Monteiro (POR)	Nora Gjakova (KOS)
Half-middleweight (−63 kg)	Faith Pitman (GBR)	Isabel Puche (ESP)	Anne-Laure Bellard (FRA)
Half-middleweight (−63 kg)	Faith Pitman (GBR)	Isabel Puche (ESP)	Marijana Mišković Hasanbegović (CRO)
Middleweight (−70 kg)	Laura Vargas Koch (GER)	Fanny Estelle Posvite (FRA)	Iljana Marzok (GER)
Middleweight (−70 kg)	Laura Vargas Koch (GER)	Fanny Estelle Posvite (FRA)	Jennifer Pitzanti (ITA)
Half-heavyweight (−78 kg)	Anamari Velenšek (SLO)	Jeong Gyeong-mi (KOR)	Gemma Gibbons (GBR)
Half-heavyweight (−78 kg)	Anamari Velenšek (SLO)	Jeong Gyeong-mi (KOR)	Natalie Powell (GBR)
Heavyweight (+78 kg)	Lucija Polavder (SLO)	Jasmin Kuelbs (GER)	Larisa Cerić (BIH)
Heavyweight (+78 kg)	Lucija Polavder (SLO)	Jasmin Kuelbs (GER)	Franziska Konitz (GER)

Source Results

=== Medal table ===
* Host nation (Croatia)

Rank	Nation	Gold	Silver	Bronze	Total
1	Germany (GER)	4	2	3	9
2	Slovenia (SLO)	2	1	0	3
3	Russia (RUS)	2	0	4	6
4	France (FRA)	1	3	2	6
5	South Korea (KOR)	1	1	2	4
6	Great Britain (GBR)	1	0	3	4
7	Switzerland (SUI)	1	0	2	3
8	Hungary (HUN)	1	0	0	1
8	Montenegro (MNE)	1	0	0	1
10	Portugal (POR)	0	2	1	3
11	Italy (ITA)	0	1	2	3
12	Belgium (BEL)	0	1	0	1
12	Czech Republic (CZE)	0	1	0	1
12	Spain (ESP)	0	1	0	1
12	Ukraine (UKR)	0	1	0	1
16	Canada (CAN)	0	0	2	2
16	Poland (POL)	0	0	2	2
18	Bosnia and Herzegovina (BIH)	0	0	1	1
18	Croatia (CRO)*	0	0	1	1
18	Israel (ISR)	0	0	1	1
18	Kosovo (KOS)	0	0	1	1
18	Sweden (SWE)	0	0	1	1
Totals (22 entries)		14	14	28	56
