= 2015 Judo World Masters =

Judo competition

Judo 2015 Judo World Masters
- Venue: Rabat
- Location: Rabat, Morocco
- Dates: 23–24 May 2015
- Competitors: 223 from 51 nations

Competition at external databases
- Links: IJF • EJU • JudoInside

The 2015 Judo World Masters was held in Rabat, Morocco, from 23 to 24 May 2015.

== Medal summary ==
=== Medal table ===
Rank	Nation	Gold	Silver	Bronze	Total
1	Japan (JPN)	3	3	6	12
2	Russia (RUS)	2	1	1	4
3	Mongolia (MGL)	2	0	2	4
4	France (FRA)	1	1	4	6
5	Azerbaijan (AZE)	1	1	1	3
5	Georgia (GEO)	1	1	1	3
7	Netherlands (NED)	1	0	2	3
8	China (CHN)	1	0	0	1
8	Ukraine (UKR)	1	0	0	1
8	United States (USA)	1	0	0	1
11	Argentina (ARG)	0	1	0	1
11	Austria (AUT)	0	1	0	1
11	Belarus (BLR)	0	1	0	1
11	Colombia (COL)	0	1	0	1
11	Czech Republic (CZE)	0	1	0	1
11	Great Britain (GBR)	0	1	0	1
11	Hungary (HUN)	0	1	0	1
18	Germany (GER)	0	0	3	3
19	Belgium (BEL)	0	0	1	1
19	Cuba (CUB)	0	0	1	1
19	Egypt (EGY)	0	0	1	1
19	Italy (ITA)	0	0	1	1
19	Romania (ROU)	0	0	1	1
19	Turkey (TUR)	0	0	1	1
19	United Arab Emirates (UAE)	0	0	1	1
19	Uzbekistan (UZB)	0	0	1	1
Totals (26 entries)		14	14	28	56

=== Men's events ===
Event	Gold	Silver	Bronze
Extra-lightweight (-60 kg)	Naohisa Takato; Japan	Orkhan Safarov; Azerbaijan	Sharafuddin Lutfillaev; Uzbekistan
Extra-lightweight (-60 kg)	Naohisa Takato; Japan	Orkhan Safarov; Azerbaijan	Boldbaatar Ganbat; Mongolia
Half-lightweight (-66 kg)	Georgii Zantaraia; Ukraine	Dzmitry Shershan; Belarus	Davaadorjiin Tömörkhüleg; Mongolia
Half-lightweight (-66 kg)	Georgii Zantaraia; Ukraine	Dzmitry Shershan; Belarus	Kengo Takaichi; Japan
Lightweight (-73 kg)	Denis Iartcev; Russia	Nugzar Tatalashvili; Georgia	Rustam Orujov; Azerbaijan
Lightweight (-73 kg)	Denis Iartcev; Russia	Nugzar Tatalashvili; Georgia	Riki Nakaya; Japan
Half-middleweight (-81 kg)	Takanori Nagase; Japan	Ivan Nifontov; Russia	Sergiu Toma; United Arab Emirates
Half-middleweight (-81 kg)	Takanori Nagase; Japan	Ivan Nifontov; Russia	Avtandil Tchrikishvili; Georgia
Middleweight (-90 kg)	Beka Gviniashvili; Georgia	Yuya Yoshida; Japan	Asley González; Cuba
Middleweight (-90 kg)	Beka Gviniashvili; Georgia	Yuya Yoshida; Japan	Noël van 't End; Netherlands
Half-heavyweight (-100 kg)	Elmar Gasimov; Azerbaijan	Lukáš Krpálek; Czech Republic	Ramadan Darwish; Egypt
Half-heavyweight (-100 kg)	Elmar Gasimov; Azerbaijan	Lukáš Krpálek; Czech Republic	Toma Nikiforov; Belgium
Heavyweight (+100 kg)	Teddy Riner; France	Barna Bor; Hungary	Roy Meyer; Netherlands
Heavyweight (+100 kg)	Teddy Riner; France	Barna Bor; Hungary	Ryu Shichinohe; Japan

=== Women's events ===
Event	Gold	Silver	Bronze
Extra-lightweight (-48 kg)	Mönkhbatyn Urantsetseg; Mongolia	Paula Pareto; Argentina	Irina Dolgova; Russia
Extra-lightweight (-48 kg)	Mönkhbatyn Urantsetseg; Mongolia	Paula Pareto; Argentina	Dilara Lokmanhekim; Turkey
Half-lightweight (-52 kg)	Natalia Kuziutina; Russia	Yuki Hashimoto; Japan	Annabelle Euranie; France
Half-lightweight (-52 kg)	Natalia Kuziutina; Russia	Yuki Hashimoto; Japan	Odette Giuffrida; Italy
Lightweight (-57 kg)	Sumiya Dorjsuren; Mongolia	Helene Receveaux; France	Corina Căprioriu; Romania
Lightweight (-57 kg)	Sumiya Dorjsuren; Mongolia	Helene Receveaux; France	Nae Udaka; Japan
Half-middleweight (-63 kg)	Miku Tashiro; Japan	Kathrin Unterwurzacher; Austria	Anne-Laure Bellard; France
Half-middleweight (-63 kg)	Miku Tashiro; Japan	Kathrin Unterwurzacher; Austria	Martyna Trajdos; Germany
Middleweight (-70 kg)	Kim Polling; Netherlands	Yuri Alvear; Colombia	Fanny Estelle Posvite; France
Middleweight (-70 kg)	Kim Polling; Netherlands	Yuri Alvear; Colombia	Chizuru Arai; Japan
Half-heavyweight (-78 kg)	Kayla Harrison; United States	Natalie Powell; Great Britain	Audrey Tcheuméo; France
Half-heavyweight (-78 kg)	Kayla Harrison; United States	Natalie Powell; Great Britain	Luise Malzahn; Germany
Heavyweight (+78 kg)	Yu Song; China	Kanae Yamabe; Japan	Megumi Tachimoto; Japan
Heavyweight (+78 kg)	Yu Song; China	Kanae Yamabe; Japan	Franziska Konitz; Germany
