= Joakim Dvärby =

Swedish judoka (born 1989)

Personal information
- Born: 20 March 1989 (age 37)
- Occupation: Judoka

Sport
- Country: Sweden
- Sport: Judo
- Weight class: ‍–‍100 kg

Achievements and titles
- World Champ.: 5th (2013)
- European Champ.: 5th (2014)
Medal record
Men's judo
Representing Sweden
IJF Grand Slam
Bronze medal – third place	2015 Baku	‍–‍90 kg
Bronze medal – third place	2016 Abu Dhabi	‍–‍100 kg
IJF Grand Prix
Silver medal – second place	2017 The Hague	‍–‍100 kg
Bronze medal – third place	2014 Qingdao	‍–‍90 kg
Bronze medal – third place	2015 Zagreb	‍–‍90 kg
Bronze medal – third place	2015 Ulaanbaatar	‍–‍90 kg
Bronze medal – third place	2016 Zagreb	‍–‍100 kg
Bronze medal – third place	2017 Hohhot	‍–‍100 kg
Bronze medal – third place	2018 Hohhot	‍–‍100 kg
European U23 Championships
Bronze medal – third place	2011 Tyumen	‍–‍90 kg

Profile at external databases
- IJF: 7232
- JudoInside.com: 43565
- Updated on 24 November 2022

Joakim Dvärby (born 2 February 1989) is a Swedish judoka.

Dvärby is the silver medalist of the 2017 Judo Grand Prix The Hague and represented Sweden at the 2020 Summer Olympics.
