= 2014 Judo Grand Prix Düsseldorf =

Judo competition

Judo 2014 Judo Grand Prix Düsseldorf
- Location: Düsseldorf, Germany
- Dates: 21–23 February 2014
- Competitors: 367 from 55 nations

Competition at external databases
- Links: IJF • EJU • JudoInside

The 2014 Judo Grand Prix Düsseldorf was held in Düsseldorf, Germany from 21 to 23 February 2014.

== Medal summary ==
=== Men's events ===
Event	Gold	Silver	Bronze
Extra-lightweight (−60 kg)	Toru Shishime (JPN)	Yuma Oshima (JPN)	Arsen Galstyan (RUS)
Extra-lightweight (−60 kg)	Toru Shishime (JPN)	Yuma Oshima (JPN)	Vincent Limare (FRA)
Half-lightweight (−66 kg)	Masashi Ebinuma (JPN)	René Schneider (GER)	Davaadorjiin Tömörkhüleg (MGL)
Half-lightweight (−66 kg)	Masashi Ebinuma (JPN)	René Schneider (GER)	Alim Gadanov (RUS)
Lightweight (−73 kg)	Hiroyuki Akimoto (JPN)	Sagi Muki (ISR)	Musa Mogushkov (RUS)
Lightweight (−73 kg)	Hiroyuki Akimoto (JPN)	Sagi Muki (ISR)	Rok Drakšič (SLO)
Half-middleweight (−81 kg)	Travis Stevens (USA)	Sven Maresch (GER)	Shukhratjon Arslanov (UZB)
Half-middleweight (−81 kg)	Travis Stevens (USA)	Sven Maresch (GER)	Alexander Wieczerzak (GER)
Middleweight (−90 kg)	Ilias Iliadis (GRE)	Noël van 't End (NED)	Zviad Gogotchuri (GEO)
Middleweight (−90 kg)	Ilias Iliadis (GRE)	Noël van 't End (NED)	Daiki Nishiyama (JPN)
Half-heavyweight (−100 kg)	Luciano Corrêa (BRA)	Maxim Rakov (KAZ)	Naidangiin Tüvshinbayar (MGL)
Half-heavyweight (−100 kg)	Luciano Corrêa (BRA)	Maxim Rakov (KAZ)	Rafael Buzacarini (BRA)
Heavyweight (+100 kg)	Daiki Kamikawa (JPN)	Faïcel Jaballah (TUN)	Adam Okruashvili (GEO)
Heavyweight (+100 kg)	Daiki Kamikawa (JPN)	Faïcel Jaballah (TUN)	Rafael Silva (BRA)

=== Women's events ===
Event	Gold	Silver	Bronze
Extra-lightweight (−48 kg)	Wu Shugen (CHN)	Mönkhbatyn Urantsetseg (MGL)	Ami Kondo (JPN)
Extra-lightweight (−48 kg)	Wu Shugen (CHN)	Mönkhbatyn Urantsetseg (MGL)	Distria Krasniqi (KOS)
Half-lightweight (−52 kg)	Natalia Kuziutina (RUS)	Yuki Hashimoto (JPN)	Mareen Kräh (GER)
Half-lightweight (−52 kg)	Natalia Kuziutina (RUS)	Yuki Hashimoto (JPN)	Érika Miranda (BRA)
Lightweight (−57 kg)	Kaori Matsumoto (JPN)	Dorjsürengiin Sumiyaa (MGL)	Ketleyn Quadros (BRA)
Lightweight (−57 kg)	Kaori Matsumoto (JPN)	Dorjsürengiin Sumiyaa (MGL)	Irina Zabludina (RUS)
Half-middleweight (−63 kg)	Marta Labazina (RUS)	Yarden Gerbi (ISR)	Kana Abe (JPN)
Half-middleweight (−63 kg)	Marta Labazina (RUS)	Yarden Gerbi (ISR)	Anicka van Emden (NED)
Middleweight (−70 kg)	Assmaa Niang (MAR)	Sally Conway (GBR)	Hwang Ye-sul (KOR)
Middleweight (−70 kg)	Assmaa Niang (MAR)	Sally Conway (GBR)	Chizuru Arai (JPN)
Half-heavyweight (−78 kg)	Luise Malzahn (GER)	Anamari Velenšek (SLO)	Natalie Powell (GBR)
Half-heavyweight (−78 kg)	Luise Malzahn (GER)	Anamari Velenšek (SLO)	Audrey Tcheuméo (FRA)
Heavyweight (+78 kg)	Megumi Tachimoto (JPN)	Franziska Konitz (GER)	Jasmin Grabowski (GER)
Heavyweight (+78 kg)	Megumi Tachimoto (JPN)	Franziska Konitz (GER)	Yu Song (CHN)

Source Results

=== Medal table ===
* Host nation (Germany)

Rank	Nation	Gold	Silver	Bronze	Total
1	Japan (JPN)	6	2	4	12
2	Russia (RUS)	2	0	4	6
3	Germany (GER)*	1	3	3	7
4	Brazil (BRA)	1	0	4	5
5	China (CHN)	1	0	1	2
6	Greece (GRE)	1	0	0	1
6	Morocco (MAR)	1	0	0	1
6	United States (USA)	1	0	0	1
9	Mongolia (MGL)	0	2	2	4
10	Israel (ISR)	0	2	0	2
11	Great Britain (GBR)	0	1	1	2
11	Netherlands (NED)	0	1	1	2
11	Slovenia (SLO)	0	1	1	2
14	Kazakhstan (KAZ)	0	1	0	1
14	Tunisia (TUN)	0	1	0	1
16	France (FRA)	0	0	2	2
16	Georgia (GEO)	0	0	2	2
18	Kosovo (KOS)	0	0	1	1
18	South Korea (KOR)	0	0	1	1
18	Uzbekistan (UZB)	0	0	1	1
Totals (20 entries)		14	14	28	56
