= 2014 Judo Grand Slam Abu Dhabi =

Judo competition

Judo 2014 Judo Grand Slam Abu Dhabi
- Location: Abu Dhabi, United Arab Emirates
- Dates: 31 October – 2 November 2014
- Competitors: 317 from 58 nations

Competition at external databases
- Links: IJF • EJU • JudoInside

The 2014 Judo Grand Slam Abu Dhabi was held in Abu Dhabi, United Arab Emirates, from 31 October to 2 November 2014.

== Medal summary ==
=== Men's events ===
Event	Gold	Silver	Bronze
Extra-lightweight (−60 kg)	Orkhan Safarov (AZE)	Dashdavaagiin Amartüvshin (MGL)	Ganboldyn Kherlen (MGL)
Extra-lightweight (−60 kg)	Orkhan Safarov (AZE)	Dashdavaagiin Amartüvshin (MGL)	Ilgar Mushkiyev (AZE)
Half-lightweight (−66 kg)	Dzmitry Shershan (BLR)	Tarlan Karimov (AZE)	Sebastian Seidl (GER)
Half-lightweight (−66 kg)	Dzmitry Shershan (BLR)	Tarlan Karimov (AZE)	Patrick Gagné (CAN)
Lightweight (−73 kg)	Dex Elmont (NED)	Musa Mogushkov (RUS)	Rok Drakšič (SLO)
Lightweight (−73 kg)	Dex Elmont (NED)	Musa Mogushkov (RUS)	Rustam Orujov (AZE)
Half-middleweight (−81 kg)	Ivan Nifontov (RUS)	Antoine Valois-Fortier (CAN)	Sergiu Toma (UAE)
Half-middleweight (−81 kg)	Ivan Nifontov (RUS)	Antoine Valois-Fortier (CAN)	Aliaksandr Stsiashenka (BLR)
Middleweight (−90 kg)	Krisztián Tóth (HUN)	Noël van 't End (NED)	Kirill Voprosov (RUS)
Middleweight (−90 kg)	Krisztián Tóth (HUN)	Noël van 't End (NED)	Ciril Grossklaus (SUI)
Half-heavyweight (−100 kg)	Dimitri Peters (GER)	Karl-Richard Frey (GER)	Cyrille Maret (FRA)
Half-heavyweight (−100 kg)	Dimitri Peters (GER)	Karl-Richard Frey (GER)	Lyès Bouyacoub (ALG)
Heavyweight (+100 kg)	Daniel Natea (ROU)	Vlăduț Simionescu (ROU)	Maciej Sarnacki (POL)
Heavyweight (+100 kg)	Daniel Natea (ROU)	Vlăduț Simionescu (ROU)	Roy Meyer (NED)

=== Women's events ===
Event	Gold	Silver	Bronze
Extra-lightweight (−48 kg)	Mönkhbatyn Urantsetseg (MGL)	Éva Csernoviczki (HUN)	Kim Sol-mi (PRK)
Extra-lightweight (−48 kg)	Mönkhbatyn Urantsetseg (MGL)	Éva Csernoviczki (HUN)	Taciana Cesar (GBS)
Half-lightweight (−52 kg)	Majlinda Kelmendi (KOS)	Andreea Chițu (ROU)	Natalia Kuziutina (RUS)
Half-lightweight (−52 kg)	Majlinda Kelmendi (KOS)	Andreea Chițu (ROU)	Annabelle Euranie (FRA)
Lightweight (−57 kg)	Telma Monteiro (POR)	Laëtitia Blot (FRA)	Sabrina Filzmoser (AUT)
Lightweight (−57 kg)	Telma Monteiro (POR)	Laëtitia Blot (FRA)	Corina Căprioriu (ROU)
Half-middleweight (−63 kg)	Tina Trstenjak (SLO)	Anicka van Emden (NED)	Martyna Trajdos (GER)
Half-middleweight (−63 kg)	Tina Trstenjak (SLO)	Anicka van Emden (NED)	Agata Ozdoba-Błach (POL)
Middleweight (−70 kg)	Laura Vargas Koch (GER)	Bernadette Graf (AUT)	Kelita Zupancic (CAN)
Middleweight (−70 kg)	Laura Vargas Koch (GER)	Bernadette Graf (AUT)	Katarzyna Kłys (POL)
Half-heavyweight (−78 kg)	Luise Malzahn (GER)	Viktoriya Turks (UKR)	Abigél Joó (HUN)
Half-heavyweight (−78 kg)	Luise Malzahn (GER)	Viktoriya Turks (UKR)	Sol Kyong (PRK)
Heavyweight (+78 kg)	Yu Song (CHN)	Franziska Konitz (GER)	Svitlana Iaromka (UKR)
Heavyweight (+78 kg)	Yu Song (CHN)	Franziska Konitz (GER)	Ksenia Chibisova (RUS)

Source Results

=== Medal table ===
* Host nation (United Arab Emirates)

Rank	Nation	Gold	Silver	Bronze	Total
1	Germany (GER)	3	2	2	7
2	Netherlands (NED)	1	2	1	4
2	Romania (ROU)	1	2	1	4
4	Russia (RUS)	1	1	3	5
5	Azerbaijan (AZE)	1	1	2	4
6	Hungary (HUN)	1	1	1	3
6	Mongolia (MGL)	1	1	1	3
8	Belarus (BLR)	1	0	1	2
8	Slovenia (SLO)	1	0	1	2
10	China (CHN)	1	0	0	1
10	Kosovo (KOS)	1	0	0	1
10	Portugal (POR)	1	0	0	1
13	Canada (CAN)	0	1	2	3
13	France (FRA)	0	1	2	3
15	Austria (AUT)	0	1	1	2
15	Ukraine (UKR)	0	1	1	2
17	Poland (POL)	0	0	3	3
18	North Korea (PRK)	0	0	2	2
19	Algeria (ALG)	0	0	1	1
19	Guinea-Bissau (GBS)	0	0	1	1
19	Switzerland (SUI)	0	0	1	1
19	United Arab Emirates (UAE)*	0	0	1	1
Totals (22 entries)		14	14	28	56
