= Tobias Englmaier =

German judoka (born 1988)

Personal information
- Born: 29 January 1988 (age 38) Munich, Bavaria, Germany
- Occupation: Judoka

Sport
- Country: Germany
- Sport: Judo
- Weight class: ‍–‍60 kg

Achievements and titles
- Olympic Games: R16 (2016)
- World Champ.: R16 (2013)
- European Champ.: 5th (2011)
Medal record
Men's judo
Representing Germany
IJF Grand Slam
Bronze medal – third place	2008 Tokyo	‍–‍60 kg
Bronze medal – third place	2015 Baku	‍–‍60 kg
IJF Grand Prix
Silver medal – second place	2015 Tbilisi	‍–‍60 kg
Silver medal – second place	2015 Zagreb	‍–‍60 kg
Bronze medal – third place	2011 Abu Dhabi	‍–‍60 kg
Bronze medal – third place	2012 Düsseldorf	‍–‍60 kg
Bronze medal – third place	2013 Qingdao	‍–‍60 kg

Profile at external databases
- IJF: 1729
- JudoInside.com: 29691
- Updated on 24 November 2022

Tobias Englmaier (born 29 January 1988 in Munich) is a German judoka who competes in the men's 60 kg category. At the 2012 Summer Olympics, he was defeated in the first round. At the 2016 Summer Olympics, he was eliminated in the third round by Felipe Kitadai.
