= 2008 European U23 Judo Championships =

Judo competition

Judo 2008 European U23 Judo Championships
- Location: Zagreb, Croatia
- Dates: 21–23 November 2008

Competition at external databases
- Links: EJU • JudoInside

The 2008 European U23 Judo Championships is an edition of the European U23 Judo Championships, organised by the International Judo Federation. It was held in Zagreb, Croatia from 21 to 23 November 2008.

== Medal summary ==
=== Medal table ===
* Host nation (Croatia)

Rank	Nation	Gold	Silver	Bronze	Total
1	Hungary (HUN)	3	0	1	4
2	Netherlands (NED)	2	1	1	4
3	Russia (RUS)	1	2	5	8
4	France (FRA)	1	1	3	5
5	Romania (ROU)	1	1	2	4
5	Ukraine (UKR)	1	1	2	4
7	Belarus (BLR)	1	0	1	2
7	Czech Republic (CZE)	1	0	1	2
9	Latvia (LAT)	1	0	0	1
9	Poland (POL)	1	0	0	1
9	Turkey (TUR)	1	0	0	1
12	Italy (ITA)	0	3	2	5
13	Germany (GER)	0	2	1	3
14	Austria (AUT)	0	1	1	2
14	Portugal (POR)	0	1	1	2
16	Lithuania (LTU)	0	1	0	1
17	Georgia (GEO)	0	0	3	3
18	Great Britain (GBR)	0	0	2	2
19	Montenegro (MNE)	0	0	1	1
19	Spain (ESP)	0	0	1	1
Totals (20 entries)		14	14	28	56

=== Men's events ===
Event	Gold	Silver	Bronze
Extra-lightweight (−60 kg)	Pavel Petřikov (CZE)	Elio Verde (ITA)	Murad Abdulaev (RUS)
Extra-lightweight (−60 kg)	Pavel Petřikov (CZE)	Elio Verde (ITA)	Georgii Zantaraia (UKR)
Half-lightweight (−66 kg)	Tomasz Kowalski (POL)	Kamal Khan-Magomedov (RUS)	Dan Fâșie (ROU)
Half-lightweight (−66 kg)	Tomasz Kowalski (POL)	Kamal Khan-Magomedov (RUS)	Ucha Khutsishvili (GEO)
Lightweight (−73 kg)	Mansur Isaev (RUS)	Giovanni Di Cristo (ITA)	Jaromír Ježek (CZE)
Lightweight (−73 kg)	Mansur Isaev (RUS)	Giovanni Di Cristo (ITA)	Peter Scharinger (AUT)
Half-middleweight (−81 kg)	Aliaksandr Stsiashenka (BLR)	Sven Maresch (GER)	Axel Clerget (FRA)
Half-middleweight (−81 kg)	Aliaksandr Stsiashenka (BLR)	Sven Maresch (GER)	Giga Tsiklauri (GEO)
Middleweight (−90 kg)	Jevgeņijs Borodavko (LAT)	Max Schirnhofer (AUT)	Zafar Makhmadov (RUS)
Middleweight (−90 kg)	Jevgeņijs Borodavko (LAT)	Max Schirnhofer (AUT)	Vladislav Potapov (UKR)
Half-heavyweight (−100 kg)	Vyacheslav Denysov (UKR)	Egidijus Žilinskas (LTU)	Daniel Matei (ROU)
Half-heavyweight (−100 kg)	Vyacheslav Denysov (UKR)	Egidijus Žilinskas (LTU)	David Loriashvili (GEO)
Heavyweight (+100 kg)	Barna Bor (HUN)	Stanislav Bondarenko (UKR)	Marko Radulović (MNE)
Heavyweight (+100 kg)	Barna Bor (HUN)	Stanislav Bondarenko (UKR)	Andrey Volkov (RUS)

=== Women's events ===
Event	Gold	Silver	Bronze
Extra-lightweight (−48 kg)	Éva Csernoviczki (HUN)	Leandra Freitas (POR)	Nataliya Kondratyeva (RUS)
Extra-lightweight (−48 kg)	Éva Csernoviczki (HUN)	Leandra Freitas (POR)	Valentina Moscatt (ITA)
Half-lightweight (−52 kg)	Andreea Catuna Ionas (ROU)	Kitty Bravik (NED)	Rosalba Forciniti (ITA)
Half-lightweight (−52 kg)	Andreea Catuna Ionas (ROU)	Kitty Bravik (NED)	Darya Skrypnik (BLR)
Lightweight (−57 kg)	Bernadett Baczkó (HUN)	Andreea Chițu (ROU)	Gemma Howell (GBR)
Lightweight (−57 kg)	Bernadett Baczkó (HUN)	Andreea Chițu (ROU)	Irina Zabludina (RUS)
Half-middleweight (−63 kg)	Anicka van Emden (NED)	Claudia Ahrens (GER)	Ana Cachola (POR)
Half-middleweight (−63 kg)	Anicka van Emden (NED)	Claudia Ahrens (GER)	Rizlen Zouak (FRA)
Middleweight (−70 kg)	Linda Bolder (NED)	Margarita Gurtsieva (RUS)	Clarisse Habricot (FRA)
Middleweight (−70 kg)	Linda Bolder (NED)	Margarita Gurtsieva (RUS)	Anett Mészáros (HUN)
Half-heavyweight (−78 kg)	Géraldine Mentouopou (FRA)	Assunta Galeone (ITA)	Rachel Schoonderbeek (NED)
Half-heavyweight (−78 kg)	Géraldine Mentouopou (FRA)	Assunta Galeone (ITA)	Marta Tort (ESP)
Heavyweight (+78 kg)	Gülşah Kocatürk (TUR)	Émilie Andéol (FRA)	Sarah Adlington (GBR)
Heavyweight (+78 kg)	Gülşah Kocatürk (TUR)	Émilie Andéol (FRA)	Franziska Konitz (GER)

Source Results
