= 2007 European U23 Judo Championships =

Judo competition

Judo 2007 European U23 Judo Championships
- Location: Salzburg, Austria
- Dates: 24–25 November 2007

Competition at external databases
- Links: EJU • JudoInside

The 2007 European U23 Judo Championships is an edition of the European U23 Judo Championships, organised by the International Judo Federation. It was held in Salzburg, Austria from 24 to 25 November 2007.

== Medal summary ==
=== Medal table ===
* Host nation (Austria)

Rank	Nation	Gold	Silver	Bronze	Total
1	Hungary (HUN)	3	1	2	6
2	Russia (RUS)	2	2	3	7
3	Germany (GER)	2	1	4	7
4	France (FRA)	1	3	4	8
5	Netherlands (NED)	1	1	0	2
5	Slovenia (SLO)	1	1	0	2
7	Greece (GRE)	1	0	2	3
7	Poland (POL)	1	0	2	3
7	Ukraine (UKR)	1	0	2	3
10	Italy (ITA)	1	0	0	1
11	Great Britain (GBR)	0	1	4	5
12	Romania (ROU)	0	1	1	2
13	Azerbaijan (AZE)	0	1	0	1
13	Bulgaria (BUL)	0	1	0	1
13	Spain (ESP)	0	1	0	1
16	Belarus (BLR)	0	0	2	2
16	Lithuania (LTU)	0	0	2	2
Totals (17 entries)		14	14	28	56

=== Men's events ===
Event	Gold	Silver	Bronze
Extra-lightweight (−60 kg)	László Burján (HUN)	Jérôme Guyot (FRA)	Alexandros Gkornteev (GRE)
Extra-lightweight (−60 kg)	László Burján (HUN)	Jérôme Guyot (FRA)	Georgii Zantaraia (UKR)
Half-lightweight (−66 kg)	Tariel Zintiridis (GRE)	Dan Fâșie (ROU)	Attila Ungvári (HUN)
Half-lightweight (−66 kg)	Tariel Zintiridis (GRE)	Dan Fâșie (ROU)	Paweł Zagrodnik (POL)
Lightweight (−73 kg)	Giovanni Di Cristo (ITA)	Samir Ismayilov (AZE)	Aliaksandr Stsiashenka (BLR)
Lightweight (−73 kg)	Giovanni Di Cristo (ITA)	Samir Ismayilov (AZE)	Malkhaz Osadze (RUS)
Half-middleweight (−81 kg)	Aljaž Sedej (SLO)	Tom Reed (GBR)	Axel Clerget (FRA)
Half-middleweight (−81 kg)	Aljaž Sedej (SLO)	Tom Reed (GBR)	Christophe Lambert (GER)
Middleweight (−90 kg)	Zafar Makhmadov (RUS)	Hervé Fichot (FRA)	Marius Labalaukis (LTU)
Middleweight (−90 kg)	Zafar Makhmadov (RUS)	Hervé Fichot (FRA)	Theodoros Masmanidis (GRE)
Half-heavyweight (−100 kg)	Artem Bloshenko (UKR)	Roman Polosin (RUS)	Andrew Burns (GBR)
Half-heavyweight (−100 kg)	Artem Bloshenko (UKR)	Roman Polosin (RUS)	Yauhen Biadulin (BLR)
Heavyweight (+100 kg)	Barna Bor (HUN)	Ivan Iliev (BUL)	Andrey Volkov (RUS)
Heavyweight (+100 kg)	Barna Bor (HUN)	Ivan Iliev (BUL)	Stanislav Bondarenko (UKR)

=== Women's events ===
Event	Gold	Silver	Bronze
Extra-lightweight (−48 kg)	Wasilisa Prill (GER)	Éva Csernoviczki (HUN)	Katarzyna Pulkosnik (POL)
Extra-lightweight (−48 kg)	Wasilisa Prill (GER)	Éva Csernoviczki (HUN)	Nataliya Kondratyeva (RUS)
Half-lightweight (−52 kg)	Anna Kharitonova (RUS)	Kitty Bravik (NED)	Melanie Lierka (GER)
Half-lightweight (−52 kg)	Anna Kharitonova (RUS)	Kitty Bravik (NED)	Andreea Catuna Ionas (ROU)
Lightweight (−57 kg)	Bernadett Baczkó (HUN)	Vesna Đukić (SLO)	Faith Pitman (GBR)
Lightweight (−57 kg)	Bernadett Baczkó (HUN)	Vesna Đukić (SLO)	Morgane Ribout (FRA)
Half-middleweight (−63 kg)	Esther Stam (NED)	Emmanuelle Payet (FRA)	Abigél Joó (HUN)
Half-middleweight (−63 kg)	Esther Stam (NED)	Emmanuelle Payet (FRA)	Claudia Ahrens (GER)
Middleweight (−70 kg)	Beáta Rainczuk (POL)	Kerstin Thiele (GER)	Sally Conway (GBR)
Middleweight (−70 kg)	Beáta Rainczuk (POL)	Kerstin Thiele (GER)	Magali Leguay (FRA)
Half-heavyweight (−78 kg)	Lucie Louette (FRA)	Marta Tort (ESP)	Josefine Vostry (GER)
Half-heavyweight (−78 kg)	Lucie Louette (FRA)	Marta Tort (ESP)	Raimonda Gedutyte (LTU)
Heavyweight (+78 kg)	Franziska Konitz (GER)	Polina Belousova (RUS)	Émilie Andéol (FRA)
Heavyweight (+78 kg)	Franziska Konitz (GER)	Polina Belousova (RUS)	Sarah Adlington (GBR)

Source Results
