= 2015 Judo Grand Slam Baku =

Judo competition

Judo 2015 Judo Grand Slam Baku
- Venue: Heydar Aliyev Sports and Exhibition Complex
- Location: Baku, Azerbaijan
- Dates: 8–10 May 2015
- Competitors: 354 from 48 nations

Competition at external databases
- Links: IJF • EJU • JudoInside

The 2015 Judo Grand Slam Baku was held in Baku, Azerbaijan from 8 to 10 May 2015.

== Medal summary ==
=== Men's events ===
Event	Gold	Silver	Bronze
Extra-lightweight (−60 kg)	Rustam Ibrayev (KAZ)	Vincent Limare (FRA)	Lukhumi Chkhvimiani (GEO)
Extra-lightweight (−60 kg)	Rustam Ibrayev (KAZ)	Vincent Limare (FRA)	Tobias Englmaier (GER)
Half-lightweight (−66 kg)	Nijat Shikhalizada (AZE)	Colin Oates (GBR)	Loïc Korval (FRA)
Half-lightweight (−66 kg)	Nijat Shikhalizada (AZE)	Colin Oates (GBR)	Sugoi Uriarte (ESP)
Lightweight (−73 kg)	Rustam Orujov (AZE)	Sainjargalyn Nyam-Ochir (MGL)	Miklós Ungvári (HUN)
Lightweight (−73 kg)	Rustam Orujov (AZE)	Sainjargalyn Nyam-Ochir (MGL)	Zelimkhan Ozdoev (RUS)
Half-middleweight (−81 kg)	Khasan Khalmurzaev (RUS)	Ushangi Margiani (GEO)	Goki Maruyama (JPN)
Half-middleweight (−81 kg)	Khasan Khalmurzaev (RUS)	Ushangi Margiani (GEO)	Dominic Ressel (GER)
Middleweight (−90 kg)	Mashu Baker (JPN)	Noël van 't End (NED)	Walter Facente (ITA)
Middleweight (−90 kg)	Mashu Baker (JPN)	Noël van 't End (NED)	Joakim Dvärby (SWE)
Half-heavyweight (−100 kg)	Adlan Bisultanov (RUS)	Elmar Gasimov (AZE)	Jorge Fonseca (POR)
Half-heavyweight (−100 kg)	Adlan Bisultanov (RUS)	Elmar Gasimov (AZE)	Ramadan Darwish (EGY)
Heavyweight (+100 kg)	Barna Bor (HUN)	Roy Meyer (NED)	Levani Matiashvili (GEO)
Heavyweight (+100 kg)	Barna Bor (HUN)	Roy Meyer (NED)	Andrey Volkov (RUS)

=== Women's events ===
Event	Gold	Silver	Bronze
Extra-lightweight (−48 kg)	Monica Ungureanu (ROU)	Éva Csernoviczki (HUN)	Nathalia Brigida (BRA)
Extra-lightweight (−48 kg)	Monica Ungureanu (ROU)	Éva Csernoviczki (HUN)	Charline Van Snick (BEL)
Half-lightweight (−52 kg)	Érika Miranda (BRA)	Andreea Chițu (ROU)	Priscilla Gneto (FRA)
Half-lightweight (−52 kg)	Érika Miranda (BRA)	Andreea Chițu (ROU)	Distria Krasniqi (KOS)
Lightweight (−57 kg)	Corina Căprioriu (ROU)	Nekoda Smythe-Davis (GBR)	Miryam Roper (GER)
Lightweight (−57 kg)	Corina Căprioriu (ROU)	Nekoda Smythe-Davis (GBR)	Irina Zabludina (RUS)
Half-middleweight (−63 kg)	Kathrin Unterwurzacher (AUT)	Martyna Trajdos (GER)	Anicka van Emden (NED)
Half-middleweight (−63 kg)	Kathrin Unterwurzacher (AUT)	Martyna Trajdos (GER)	Alice Schlesinger (GBR)
Middleweight (−70 kg)	Sally Conway (GBR)	Kim Polling (NED)	Marie-Ève Gahié (FRA)
Middleweight (−70 kg)	Sally Conway (GBR)	Kim Polling (NED)	Bernadette Graf (AUT)
Half-heavyweight (−78 kg)	Guusje Steenhuis (NED)	Akari Ogata (JPN)	Daria Pogorzelec (POL)
Half-heavyweight (−78 kg)	Guusje Steenhuis (NED)	Akari Ogata (JPN)	Kayla Harrison (USA)
Heavyweight (+78 kg)	Svitlana Iaromka (UKR)	Santa Pakenytė (LTU)	Jasmin Grabowski (GER)
Heavyweight (+78 kg)	Svitlana Iaromka (UKR)	Santa Pakenytė (LTU)	Belkıs Zehra Kaya (TUR)

Source Results

=== Medal table ===
* Host nation (Azerbaijan)

Rank	Nation	Gold	Silver	Bronze	Total
1	Azerbaijan (AZE)*	2	1	0	3
1	Romania (ROU)	2	1	0	3
3	Russia (RUS)	2	0	3	5
4	Netherlands (NED)	1	3	1	5
5	Great Britain (GBR)	1	2	1	4
6	Hungary (HUN)	1	1	1	3
6	Japan (JPN)	1	1	1	3
8	Austria (AUT)	1	0	1	2
8	Brazil (BRA)	1	0	1	2
10	Kazakhstan (KAZ)	1	0	0	1
10	Ukraine (UKR)	1	0	0	1
12	Germany (GER)	0	1	4	5
13	France (FRA)	0	1	3	4
14	Georgia (GEO)	0	1	2	3
15	Lithuania (LTU)	0	1	0	1
15	Mongolia (MGL)	0	1	0	1
17	Belgium (BEL)	0	0	1	1
17	Egypt (EGY)	0	0	1	1
17	Italy (ITA)	0	0	1	1
17	Kosovo (KOS)	0	0	1	1
17	Poland (POL)	0	0	1	1
17	Portugal (POR)	0	0	1	1
17	Spain (ESP)	0	0	1	1
17	Sweden (SWE)	0	0	1	1
17	Turkey (TUR)	0	0	1	1
17	United States (USA)	0	0	1	1
Totals (26 entries)		14	14	28	56
