= Luuk Verbij =

Dutch judoka (born 1986)

Personal information
- Born: 2 August 1986 (age 39)
- Occupation: Judoka

Sport
- Country: Netherlands
- Sport: Judo
- Weight class: +100 kg

Achievements and titles
- Olympic Games: R32 (2012)
- World Champ.: R16 (2011)
- European Champ.: 7th (2012)
Medal record
Men's judo
Representing the Netherlands
IJF Grand Prix
Silver medal – second place	2011 Abu Dhabi	+100 kg
Summer Universiade
Gold medal – first place	2009 Belgrade	+100 kg

Profile at external databases
- IJF: 2629
- JudoInside.com: 32024
- Updated on 1 January 2023

Luuk Verbij (born 2 August 1986 in Alphen aan den Rijn) is a Dutch judoka. He competed at the 2012 Summer Olympics in the +100 kg event.
