= Svitlana Iaromka =

Ukrainian judoka (born 1989)

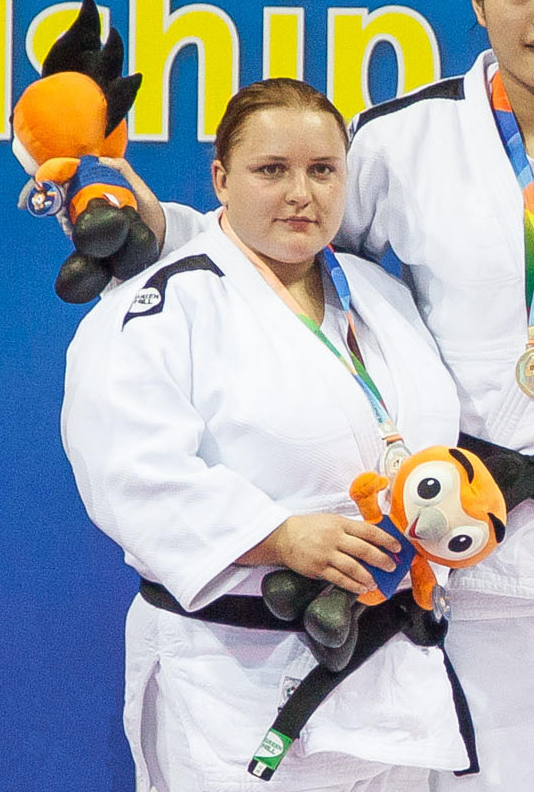
- Iaromka at the 2015 Military World Games

Personal information
- Full name: Svitlana Mykolayivna Iaromka
- Born: 9 April 1989 (age 37) Kyiv Oblast, Ukrainian SSR, Soviet Union
- Occupation: Judoka

Sport
- Country: Ukraine
- Sport: Judo, Sumo
- Weight class: +78 kg

Achievements and titles
- Olympic Games: R16 (2016)
- World Champ.: R16 (2015)
- European Champ.: (silver) (2016, 2017)
Medal record
Representing Ukraine
Women's judo
European Games
Bronze medal – third place	2015 Baku	+78 kg
European Championships
Silver medal – second place	2016 Kazan	+78 kg
Silver medal – second place	2017 Warsaw	+78 kg
Bronze medal – third place	2010 Vienna	Women's team
IJF Grand Slam
Gold medal – first place	2015 Baku	+78 kg
Bronze medal – third place	2014 Abu Dhabi	+78 kg
Bronze medal – third place	2017 Baku	+78 kg
IJF Grand Prix
Gold medal – first place	2014 Tashkent	+78 kg
Silver medal – second place	2014 Budapest	+78 kg
Silver medal – second place	2014 Zagreb	+78 kg
Silver medal – second place	2015 Tbilisi	+78 kg
Bronze medal – third place	2014 Astana	+78 kg
Bronze medal – third place	2015 Qingdao	+78 kg
Bronze medal – third place	2016 Havana	+78 kg
Bronze medal – third place	2016 Samsun	+78 kg
Bronze medal – third place	2017 Tbilisi	+78 kg
European U23 Championships
Silver medal – second place	2009 Antalya	+78 kg
World Juniors Championships
Bronze medal – third place	2008 Bangkok	+78 kg
European Junior Championships
Silver medal – second place	2007 Prague	+78 kg
Summer Universiade
Bronze medal – third place	2009 Belgrade	+78 kg
Military World Games
Silver medal – second place	2015 Mungyeong	+78 kg
Women's sumo
World Games
Gold medal – first place	2022 Birmingham	Heavyweight
Bronze medal – third place	2013 Cali	Openweight
Bronze medal – third place	2022 Birmingham	Openweight
World Combat Games
Silver medal – second place	2010 Beijing	Openweight
Gold medal – first place	2023 Riyadh	Openweight

Profile at external databases
- IJF: 2766
- JudoInside.com: 33193
- Updated on 20 June 2024

Svitlana Mykolayivna Iaromka (Ukrainian: Світлана Миколаївна Ярьомка, born 9 April 1989) is a Ukrainian judoka. She is the 2016 European silver medalist in the +78 kg division. Iaromka repeated her success next year.

Iaromka also practises sumo and was a participant of the 2013 World Games where she won bronze in open event.
