= Andrey Volkov (judoka) =

Russian judoka (born 1986)

Personal information
- Born: 13 November 1986 (age 39)
- Occupation: Judoka

Sport
- Country: Russia
- Sport: Judo
- Weight class: +100 kg

Achievements and titles
- World Champ.: R16 (2011)
- European Champ.: 7th (2011)
Medal record
Men's judo
Representing Russia
IJF Grand Slam
Gold medal – first place	2016 Tyumen	+100 kg
Bronze medal – third place	2013 Baku	+100 kg
Bronze medal – third place	2015 Baku	+100 kg
Bronze medal – third place	2017 Ekaterinburg	+100 kg
Bronze medal – third place	2018 Düsseldorf	+100 kg
IJF Grand Prix
Silver medal – second place	2016 Tashkent	+100 kg
Bronze medal – third place	2014 Budapest	+100 kg
Bronze medal – third place	2015 Jeju	+100 kg
Bronze medal – third place	2016 Qingdao	+100 kg
Bronze medal – third place	2017 Hohhot	+100 kg
European U23 Championships
Bronze medal – third place	2007 Salzburg	+100 kg
Bronze medal – third place	2008 Zagreb	+100 kg
Summer Universiade
Bronze medal – third place	2009 Belgrade	+100 kg

Profile at external databases
- IJF: 7214
- JudoInside.com: 33009
- Updated on 24 November 2022

Andrey Volkov (born 13 November 1986) is a Russian judoka.

Volkov is the gold medalist of the 2016 Judo Grand Slam Tyumen in the +100 kg category.
