= Megumi Tachimoto =

Japanese judoka (born 1989)

Personal information
- Nationality: Japanese
- Born: 27 January 1989 (age 37)
- Occupation: Judoka

Sport
- Country: Japan
- Sport: Judo
- Weight class: +78 kg

Achievements and titles
- World Champ.: (silver) (2015)
- Asian Champ.: (gold) (2011)
Medal record
Women's judo
Representing Japan
World Championships
Silver medal – second place	2015 Astana	+78 kg
Bronze medal – third place	2008 Paris Levallois	Open
Bronze medal – third place	2010 Tokyo	Open
Bronze medal – third place	2013 Rio de Janeiro	+78 kg
Bronze medal – third place	2014 Chelyabinsk	+78 kg
Asian Games
Bronze medal – third place	2010 Guangzhou	Open
Asian Championships
Gold medal – first place	2011 Abu Dhabi	+78 kg
World Masters
Gold medal – first place	2011 Baku	+78 kg
Bronze medal – third place	2010 Suwon	+78 kg
Bronze medal – third place	2015 Rabat	+78 kg
IJF Grand Slam
Gold medal – first place	2010 Tokyo	+78 kg
Gold medal – first place	2011 Paris	+78 kg
Gold medal – first place	2011 Rio de Janeiro	+78 kg
Gold medal – first place	2012 Paris	+78 kg
Gold medal – first place	2012 Tokyo	+78 kg
Gold medal – first place	2013 Paris	+78 kg
Gold medal – first place	2013 Tokyo	+78 kg
Gold medal – first place	2016 Paris	+78 kg
Silver medal – second place	2010 Moscow	+78 kg
Silver medal – second place	2011 Tokyo	+78 kg
Bronze medal – third place	2009 Paris	+78 kg
Bronze medal – third place	2009 Tokyo	+78 kg
Bronze medal – third place	2011 Moscow	+78 kg
Bronze medal – third place	2014 Tokyo	+78 kg
IJF Grand Prix
Gold medal – first place	2010 Düsseldorf	+78 kg
Gold medal – first place	2013 Miami	+78 kg
Gold medal – first place	2014 Düsseldorf	+78 kg
Gold medal – first place	2014 Budapest	+78 kg
Silver medal – second place	2017 Düsseldorf	+78 kg
World Juniors Championships
Gold medal – first place	2008 Bangkok	+78 kg
Asian Junior Championships
Gold medal – first place	2008 Sana'a	+78 kg
Bronze medal – third place	2005 Beirut	+78 kg

Profile at external databases
- IJF: 2008
- JudoInside.com: 35499
- Updated on 3 July 2023

Megumi Tachimoto (田知本 愛, Tachimoto Megumi; born 27 January 1989) is a Japanese female former judoka. She won a bronze medal in the Openweight division at the 2010 World Judo Championships.
