= Kayra Özdemir =

French-Turkish judoka (born 1988)

Kayra Özdemir (formerly Kayra Sayit)
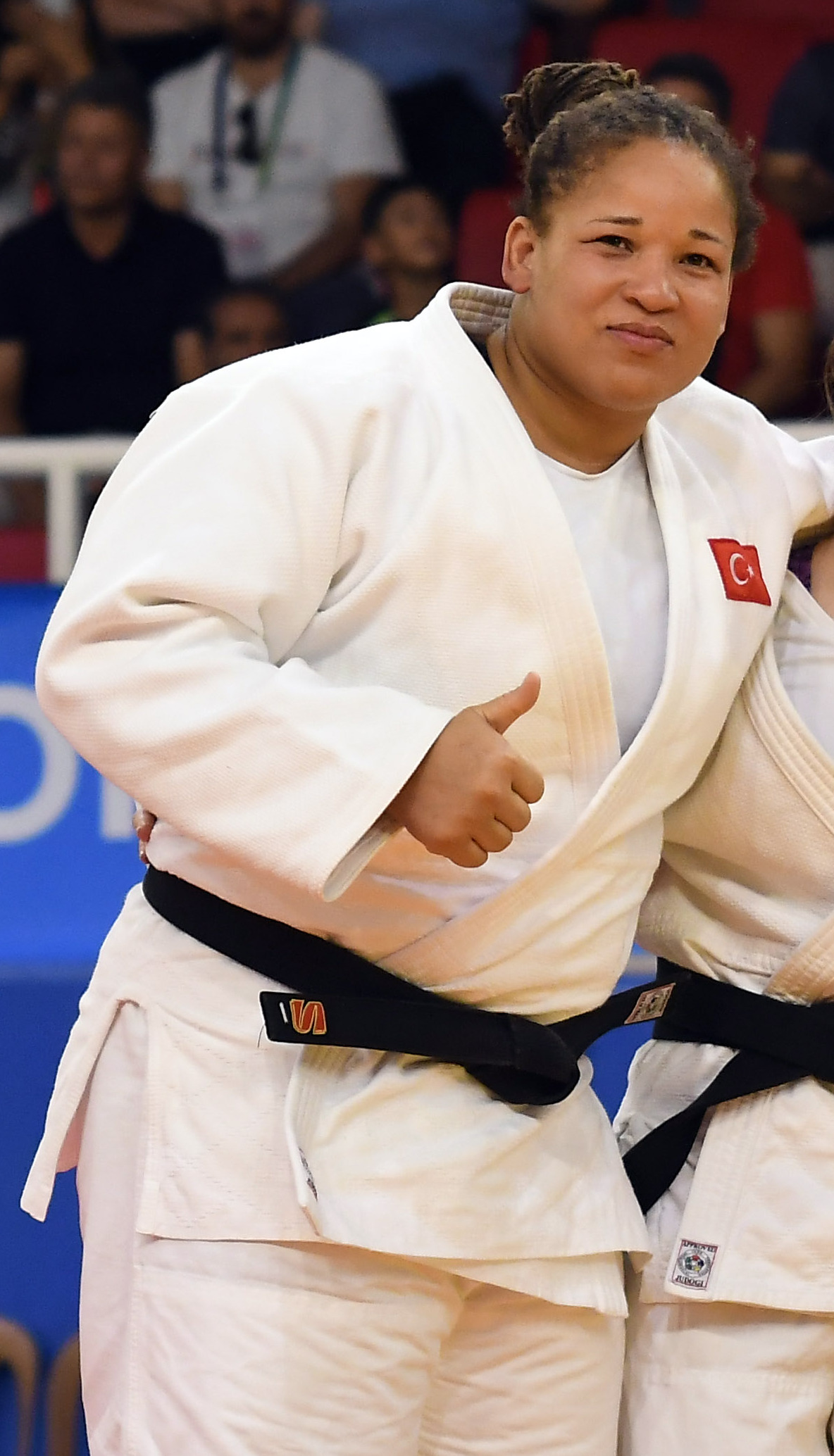

Personal information
- Full name: Kayra Almira Özdemir
- Nationality: French; Turkish
- Born: Ketty Mathé; 13 February 1988 (age 38) Fort-de-France, Martinique
- Occupation: Judoka
- Height: 1.78 m (5 ft 10 in)
- Weight: 108 kg (238 lb)

Sport
- Country: France (until 2014); Turkey (since 2015)
- Sport: Judo
- Weight class: +78 kg

Achievements and titles
- Olympic Games: 5th (2016, 2020, 2024)
- World Champ.: (silver) (2024)
- European Champ.: (gold) (2016, 2021)
Medal record
Women's judo
Representing Turkey
World Championships
Silver medal – second place	2024 Abu Dhabi	+78 kg
Bronze medal – third place	2018 Baku	+78 kg
Bronze medal – third place	2019 Tokyo	+78 kg
European Championships
Gold medal – first place	2016 Kazan	+78 kg
Gold medal – first place	2021 Lisbon	+78 kg
Bronze medal – third place	2024 Zagreb	+78 kg
World Masters
Bronze medal – third place	2021 Doha	+78 kg
IJF Grand Slam
Gold medal – first place	2020 Budapest	+78 kg
Gold medal – first place	2023 Antalya	+78 kg
Silver medal – second place	2017 Baku	+78 kg
Silver medal – second place	2023 Tel Aviv	+78 kg
Silver medal – second place	2024 Paris	+78 kg
Bronze medal – third place	2024 Antalya	+78 kg
IJF Grand Prix
Gold medal – first place	2015 Budapest	+78 kg
Gold medal – first place	2016 Tbilisi	+78 kg
Gold medal – first place	2017 Antalya	+78 kg
Gold medal – first place	2019 Marrakesh	+78 kg
Gold medal – first place	2019 Perth	+78 kg
Gold medal – first place	2023 Zagreb	+78 kg
Silver medal – second place	2016 Almaty	+78 kg
Bronze medal – third place	2015 Tashkent	+78 kg
Bronze medal – third place	2019 Antalya	+78 kg
Bronze medal – third place	2020 Tel Aviv	+78 kg
Mediterranean Games
Gold medal – first place	2018 Tarragona	+78 kg
Gold medal – first place	2022 Oran	+78 kg
Islamic Solidarity Games
Gold medal – first place	2017 Baku	+78 kg
Gold medal – first place	2017 Baku	Women's team
Gold medal – first place	2021 Konya	+78 kg
Gold medal – first place	2021 Konya	Women's team
Representing France
European Championships
Bronze medal – third place	2007 Warsaw	Open
IJF Grand Prix
Silver medal – second place	2011 Abu Dhabi	+78 kg
World Juniors Championships
Silver medal – second place	2006 Santo Domingo	+78 kg
European Junior Championships
Gold medal – first place	2006 Tallinn	+78 kg
Gold medal – first place	2007 Prague	+78 kg

Profile at external databases
- IJF: 19203, 4142
- JudoInside.com: 33102
- Updated on 3 August 2024

Kayra Almira Özdemir (née Kayra Sayit; born Ketty Mathé on 13 February 1988) is a French-born Turkish European champion female judoka competing in the +78 kg division.

Coming from Saint-Brieuc-de-Mauron in Brittany, she competed for France until her marriage in Turkey in February 2015. She then changed her name from Ketty Mathé to Kayra Sayit, and began to compete for Turkey after acquiring the Turkish citizenship.

Özdemir was a finalist in the 2011 Prague World Cup, and was selected along with fellow Breton Laëtitia Payet for the World Championships, competing on 27 August in Paris-Bercy.

In 2016, Özdemir won the gold medal at the Tbilisi Grand Prix, and at the European Championships in Kazan, Russia.

In 2021, Özdemir won one of the bronze medals in her event at the 2021 World Masters held in Doha, Qatar. She took the gold medal at the 2021 European Championships in Lisbon, Portugal. She competed in the women's +78 kg event at the 2020 Summer Olympics in Tokyo, Japan. where she placed fifth.

She won the gold medal in the women's +78 kg event at the 2022 Mediterranean Games held in Oran, Algeria.

Özdemir also competed at the 2024 Summer Olympics.

== Achievements ==
As of 23 May 2024.

Medal winner in senior tournaments only.

Year	Tournament	Place	Weight class
Competitor for France
2007	European Open Championships	3rd	Open class
2007	European Team Championships Minsk	3rd	+78 kg team
2007	World Cup Vienna	3rd	+78 kg
2008	Super World Cup Tournoi de Paris	3rd	+78 kg
2008	World Cup Warsaw	3rd	+78 kg
2008	World Cup Rome	1st	+78 kg
2008	Super World Cup Moscow	1st	+78 kg
2011	Grand Prix Abu Dhabi	2nd	+78 kg
2011	World Cup Prague	2nd	+78 kg
2011	World Cup Rome	1st	+78 kg
2012	European Team Championships Chelyabinsk	2nd	+70 kg team
2012	World Cup Budapest	3rd	+78 kg
2014	Belgian Ladies Open Arlon	1st	+78 kg
2014	Swiss Judo Open Uster	1st	+78 kg
2014	European Cup London	1st	+78 kg
Competitor for Turkey
2015	Grand Prix Budapest	1st	+78 kg
2015	Grand Prix Tashkent	3rd	+78 kg
2016	Grand Prix Tbilisi	1st	+78 kg
2016	European Championships	1st	+78 kg
2018	World Championships	3rd	+78 kg
2019	World Championships	3rd	+78 kg
2021	European Championships	1st	+78 kg
2024	European Championships	3rd	+78 kg
2024	World Championships	2nd	+78 kg
