= Jasmin Grabowski =

German judoka (born 1991)

Personal information
- Born: Jasmin Külbs; 7 November 1991 (age 34)
- Occupation: Judoka
- Weight: 127 kg (280 lb)

Sport
- Country: Germany
- Sport: Judo
- Weight class: +78 kg

Achievements and titles
- Olympic Games: R32 (2016, 2020)
- World Champ.: 5th (2014)
- European Champ.: (silver) (2015)
Medal record
Women's judo
Representing Germany
Olympic Games
Bronze medal – third place	2020 Tokyo	Mixed team
European Games
Silver medal – second place	2015 Baku	+78 kg
European Championships
Bronze medal – third place	2014 Montpellier	+78 kg
Bronze medal – third place	2016 Kazan	+78 kg
IJF Grand Slam
Silver medal – second place	2017 Ekaterinburg	+78 kg
Bronze medal – third place	2013 Moscow	+78 kg
Bronze medal – third place	2015 Baku	+78 kg
Bronze medal – third place	2015 Tyumen	+78 kg
IJF Grand Prix
Silver medal – second place	2013 Rijeka	+78 kg
Silver medal – second place	2014 Samsun	+78 kg
Bronze medal – third place	2013 Samsun	+78 kg
Bronze medal – third place	2013 Qingdao	+78 kg
Bronze medal – third place	2014 Düsseldorf	+78 kg
Bronze medal – third place	2014 Budapest	+78 kg
Bronze medal – third place	2014 Ulaanbaatar	+78 kg
Bronze medal – third place	2015 Samsun	+78 kg
Bronze medal – third place	2015 Zagreb	+78 kg
Bronze medal – third place	2016 Samsun	+78 kg
Bronze medal – third place	2019 Antalya	+78 kg
Bronze medal – third place	2019 Hohhot	+78 kg
European U23 Championships
Bronze medal – third place	2012 Prague	+78 kg

Profile at external databases
- IJF: 1202
- JudoInside.com: 37407
- Updated on 11 November 2022

Jasmin Grabowski née Külbs (born 7 November 1991) is a German judoka. She competed at the 2016 Summer Olympics in Rio de Janeiro, in the women's +78 kg. She was defeated by Ksenia Chibisova of Russia in the first round.

In 2021, she competed in the women's +78 kg event at the 2021 World Judo Championships held in Budapest, Hungary. She also competed in the women's +78 kg event at the 2020 Summer Olympics in Tokyo, Japan.

She is openly lesbian.
