= Belkıs Zehra Kaya =

Turkish judoka (born 1984)

Personal information
- Nationality: Turkish
- Born: March 18, 1984 (age 42)
- Occupation: Judoka

Sport
- Country: Turkey
- Sport: Judo
- Weight class: +78 kg
- Club: Galatasaray Judo

Achievements and titles
- World Champ.: 9th (2003)
- European Champ.: (bronze) (2012, 2013, 2015, 2016)
Medal record
Representing Turkey
Women's Judo
European Games
Bronze medal – third place	2015 Baku	+78 kg
European Championships
Bronze medal – third place	2012 Chelyabinsk	+78 kg
Bronze medal – third place	2013 Budapest	+78 kg
Bronze medal – third place	2016 Kazan	+78 kg
Mediterranean Games
Gold medal – first place	2005 Almeria	+78 kg
Bronze medal – third place	2013 Mersin	+78 kg
Summer Universiade
Silver medal – second place	2007 Bangkok	+78 kg
Bronze medal – third place	2009 Belgrade	Open
Bronze medal – third place	2011 Shenzhen	+78 kg
IJF Grand Slam
Silver medal – second place	2013 Baku	+78 kg
Bronze medal – third place	2015 Baku	+78 kg
IJF Grand Prix
Gold medal – first place	2013 Samsun	+78 kg
Gold medal – first place	2015 Zagreb	+78 kg
Silver medal – second place	2010 Abu Dhabi	+78 kg
Silver medal – second place	2015 Jeju	+78 kg
Bronze medal – third place	2010 Rotterdam	+78 kg
European U23 Championships
Gold medal – first place	2004 Ljubljana	+78 kg
World Juniors Championships
Bronze medal – third place	2002 Jeju	+78 kg
European Cadet Championships
Gold medal – first place	2000 Oradea	+70 kg

Profile at external databases
- IJF: 3532
- JudoInside.com: 12612
- Updated on 12 February 2022

Belkıs Zehra Kaya (born 18 March 1984) is a Turkish judoka competing in the +78 kg division.

In 2015, Kaya took the gold medal at the Grand Prix Zagreb, and two bronze medals, at the Grand Slam Baku and then at the 2015 European Games again in Baku, Azerbaijan. She won the bronze medal at the 2016 European Judo Championships in Kazan, Russia.

== Achievements ==
As of 25 April 2016.

Listed medals in international senior competitions only.

Year	Tournament	Rank	Weight Class
2016	European Championships	3rd	+78 kg
2015	European Games	3rd	+78 kg
2015	Grand Prix Jeju	2nd	+78 kg
2015	Grand Slam Baku	3rd	+78 kg
2015	Grand Prix Zagreb	1st	+78 kg
2013	Mediterranean Games	3rd	+78 kg
2013	European Championships	3rd	+78 kg
2013	IJF Grand Slam Baku	2nd	+78 kg
2013	Grand Prix Samsun	1st	+78 kg
2013	European Open Prague	2nd	+78 kg
2013	European Open Sofia	3rd	+78 kg
2012	European Championships	3rd	+78 kg
2012	World Cup Istanbul	1st	+78 kg
2012	European Team Championships Chelyabinsk	3rd	+70 kg team
2012	Balkan Championships Trebinje	1st	+78 kg
2011	FISU Universiade Shenzhen	3rd	+78 kg
2011	IJF World Cup Apia	2nd	+78 kg
2011	World Cup Rome	3rd	+78 kg
2011	World Cup Lisbon	3rd	+78 kg
2011	European Cup Istanbul	1st	+78 kg team
2011	European Team Championships Istanbul	3rd	+70 kg team
2010	Grand Prix Abu Dhabi	2nd	+78 kg
2010	Grand Prix Rotterdam	3rd	+78 kg
2010	World Cup Baku	1st	+78 kg
2010	European Cup Istanbul	3rd	+78 kg
2009	FISU Universiade Belgrade	3rd	Open class
2007	FISU Universiade Bangkok	2nd	+78 kg
2006	World Cuop Baku	2nd	+78 kg
2005	Mediterranean Games	1st	+78 kg
2005	World Cup Minsk	3rd	+78 kg
2005	Int'l Tournament Nabeul Tunisia	1st	+78 kg
2004	A-Tournament Rome	3rd	+78 kg
2004	World University Championships Moscow	3rd	+78 kg
2004	Balkan Championships Bucharest	1st	+78 kg
2004	B Tournament Istanbul	1st	+78 kg
2003	Balkan Championships Belgrade	3rd	+78 kg
2002	A-Tournament Minsk	3rd	+78 kg
2002	A-Tournament Sofia	3rd	+78 kg
2001	Int'l Bosporus Tournament Istanbul	1st	+78 kg
2001	Int'l Bosporus Tournament Istanbul	2nd	Open class
