= Kanae Yamabe =

Japanese judoka (born 1990)

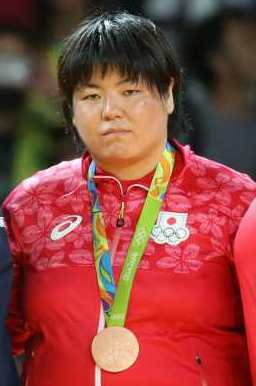

Personal information
- Nationality: Japanese
- Born: 22 September 1990 (age 35)
- Occupation: Judoka

Sport
- Country: Japan
- Sport: Judo
- Weight class: +78 kg

Achievements and titles
- Olympic Games: (bronze) (2016)
- World Champ.: (bronze) (2015)
Medal record
Women's judo
Representing Japan
Olympic Games
Bronze medal – third place	2016 Rio de Janeiro	+78 kg
World Championships
Bronze medal – third place	2015 Astana	+78 kg
World Masters
Silver medal – second place	2015 Rabat	+78 kg
Bronze medal – third place	2016 Guadalajara	+78 kg
IJF Grand Slam
Gold medal – first place	2014 Paris	+78 kg
Gold medal – first place	2014 Tyumen	+78 kg
Gold medal – first place	2016 Baku	+78 kg
Silver medal – second place	2013 Moscow	+78 kg
Silver medal – second place	2013 Tokyo	+78 kg
Silver medal – second place	2017 Paris	+78 kg
Bronze medal – third place	2010 Tokyo	+78 kg
Bronze medal – third place	2016 Tokyo	+78 kg
IJF Grand Prix
Gold medal – first place	2015 Düsseldorf	+78 kg
Bronze medal – third place	2013 Düsseldorf	+78 kg
World Juniors Championships
Bronze medal – third place	2009 Paris	+78 kg
Summer Universiade
Gold medal – first place	2011 Shenzhen	Women's team
Silver medal – second place	2009 Belgrade	Open

Profile at external databases
- IJF: 2491
- JudoInside.com: 55553
- Updated on 24 May 2023

Kanae Yamabe (山部 佳苗, Yamabe Kanae; born 22 September 1990 in Hokkaido) is a Japanese female judoka.

Yamabe started judo at the age of 6. Her favorite technique is harai Goshi.

In 2009, Yamabe won a bronze medal in the +78 kg weight class at the 2009 World Judo Juniors Championships in Paris.

In 2015, Yamabe won a bronze medal in the heavyweight (+78 kg) division at the 2015 World Judo Championships.
