= Franziska Konitz =

German judoka (born 1986)

Personal information
- Born: 24 November 1986 (age 39)
- Occupation: Judoka

Sport
- Country: Germany
- Sport: Judo
- Weight class: ‍–‍78 kg \ +78 kg

Achievements and titles
- World Champ.: 5th (2009, 2014)
- European Champ.: (bronze) (2008, 2009, 2014)
Medal record
Women's judo
Representing Germany
European Games
Silver medal – second place	2015 Baku	Women's team
European Championships
Bronze medal – third place	2008 Lisbon	+78 kg
Bronze medal – third place	2009 Tbilisi	+78 kg
Bronze medal – third place	2014 Montpellier	+78 kg
World Masters
Bronze medal – third place	2015 Rabat	+78 kg
IJF Grand Slam
Silver medal – second place	2014 Abu Dhabi	+78 kg
Silver medal – second place	2015 Paris	+78 kg
Bronze medal – third place	2009 Rio de Janeiro	+78 kg
IJF Grand Prix
Gold medal – first place	2013 Abu Dhabi	+78 kg
Gold medal – first place	2014 Astana	+78 kg
Silver medal – second place	2014 Düsseldorf	+78 kg
Silver medal – second place	2014 Havana	+78 kg
Bronze medal – third place	2010 Düsseldorf	+78 kg
Bronze medal – third place	2010 Abu Dhabi	+78 kg
Bronze medal – third place	2011 Baku	+78 kg
Bronze medal – third place	2013 Düsseldorf	+78 kg
Bronze medal – third place	2013 Rijeka	+78 kg
Bronze medal – third place	2014 Ulaanbaatar	+78 kg
Bronze medal – third place	2014 Tashkent	+78 kg
Bronze medal – third place	2015 Düsseldorf	+78 kg
Bronze medal – third place	2015 Tbilisi	+78 kg
Bronze medal – third place	2015 Zagreb	+78 kg
Bronze medal – third place	2015 Budapest	+78 kg
European U23 Championships
Gold medal – first place	2007 Salzburg	+78 kg
Bronze medal – third place	2008 Zagreb	+78 kg
World Juniors Championships
Silver medal – second place	2004 Budapest	‍–‍78 kg
European Junior Championships
Gold medal – first place	2004 Sofia	‍–‍78 kg
Gold medal – first place	2005 Zagreb	‍–‍78 kg
European Cadet Championships
Gold medal – first place	2002 Győr	‍–‍70 kg

Profile at external databases
- IJF: 550
- JudoInside.com: 13150
- Updated on 16 November 2022

Franziska Konitz (born 24 November 1986) is a German judoka.

== Achievements ==
Year	Tournament	Place	Weight class
2009	European Championships	3rd	Heavyweight (+78 kg)
2008	European Championships	3rd	Heavyweight (+78 kg)
