= Émilie Andéol =

French judoka (born 1987)

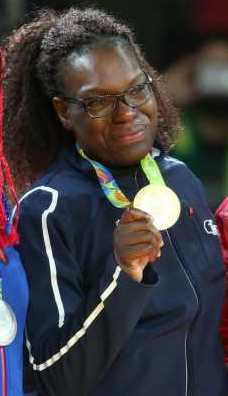
- Andéol after winning a gold medal at the 2016 Summer Olympics

Personal information
- Born: 30 October 1987 (age 38) Bordeaux, France
- Occupation: Judoka

Sport
- Country: France
- Sport: Judo
- Weight class: +78 kg

Achievements and titles
- Olympic Games: (gold) (2016)
- World Champ.: (bronze) (2014)
- European Champ.: (gold) (2014, 2015)
Medal record
Women's judo
Representing France
Olympic Games
Gold medal – first place	2016 Rio de Janeiro	+78 kg
World Championships
Gold medal – first place	2014 Chelyabinsk	Women's team
Bronze medal – third place	2014 Chelyabinsk	+78 kg
Bronze medal – third place	2017 Budapest	Mixed team
European Games
Gold medal – first place	2015 Baku	+78 kg
European Championships
Gold medal – first place	2014 Montpellier	+78 kg
Silver medal – second place	2013 Budapest	+78 kg
IJF Grand Slam
Gold medal – first place	2015 Paris	+78 kg
Silver medal – second place	2014 Paris	+78 kg
Bronze medal – third place	2015 Abu Dhabi	+78 kg
Bronze medal – third place	2015 Tokyo	+78 kg
Bronze medal – third place	2016 Baku	+78 kg
Bronze medal – third place	2017 Paris	+78 kg
IJF Grand Prix
Gold medal – first place	2012 Abu Dhabi	+78 kg
Silver medal – second place	2013 Düsseldorf	+78 kg
Bronze medal – third place	2013 Miami	+78 kg
Bronze medal – third place	2013 Abu Dhabi	+78 kg
Bronze medal – third place	2014 Havana	+78 kg
Bronze medal – third place	2014 Jeju	+78 kg
Bronze medal – third place	2015 Tbilisi	+78 kg
European U23 Championships
Silver medal – second place	2008 Zagreb	+78 kg
Bronze medal – third place	2007 Salzburg	+78 kg
Summer Universiade
Bronze medal – third place	2011 Shenzhen	+78 kg
Bronze medal – third place	2011 Shenzhen	Open
Bronze medal – third place	2011 Shenzhen	Women's team

Profile at external databases
- IJF: 2313
- JudoInside.com: 34945
- Updated on 24 May 2023

Émilie Gladwys Andéol (born 30 October 1987) is a French judoka competing in the women's +78 kg division. She won a gold medal at the 2014 European Judo Championships in Montpellier, and a bronze medal at the 2014 World Judo Championships in Chelyabinsk. She won the gold medal at the 2016 Summer Olympics in Rio de Janeiro.

Awards and achievements
Preceded by Pauline Ferrand-Prévot	French Sportswoman of the Year; 2016	Succeeded by Tessa Worley
