= Santa Pakenytė =

Lithuanian judoka (born 1990)

Personal information
- Born: 11 December 1990 (age 35)
- Occupation: Judoka

Sport
- Country: Lithuania
- Sport: Judo
- Weight class: +78 kg

Achievements and titles
- Olympic Games: R16 (2016)
- World Champ.: R16 (2014, 2017)
- European Champ.: 5th (2015, 2016)
Medal record
Women's judo
Representing Lithuania
IJF Grand Slam
Silver medal – second place	2015 Baku	+78 kg
Bronze medal – third place	2016 Abu Dhabi	+78 kg
IJF Grand Prix
Silver medal – second place	2017 Zagreb	+78 kg
Summer Universiade
Silver medal – second place	2017 Taipei	+78 kg
Bronze medal – third place	2015 Gwangju	+78 kg
Bronze medal – third place	2017 Taipei	Open

Profile at external databases
- IJF: 15096
- JudoInside.com: 41471
- Updated on 24 November 2022

Santa Pakenytė (born 11 December 1990) is a Lithuanian female judoka and sambo athlete.

In 2011 Pakenytė won bronze medal in World Sambo Championships. Pakenytė qualified for the 2016 Summer Olympics.
