= Ksenia Chibisova =

Russian judoka (born 1988)

Personal information
- Native name: Ксения Эдуардовна Чибисова
- Full name: Ksenia Eduardovna Chibisova
- Born: 13 July 1988 (age 38) Perm, Soviet Union
- Occupation: Judoka
- Height: 186 cm (6 ft 1 in)

Sport
- Country: Russia
- Sport: Judo
- Weight class: +78 kg

Achievements and titles
- Olympic Games: R16 (2016)
- World Champ.: 5th (2015)
- European Champ.: (bronze) (2019)
Medal record
Women's judo
Representing Russia
European Games
Gold medal – first place	2019 Minsk	Mixed team
Bronze medal – third place	2019 Minsk	+78 kg
IJF Grand Slam
Bronze medal – third place	2014 Baku	+78 kg
Bronze medal – third place	2014 Abu Dhabi	+78 kg
Bronze medal – third place	2014 Tokyo	+78 kg
IJF Grand Prix
Gold medal – first place	2019 Tashkent	+78 kg
Bronze medal – third place	2013 Almaty	+78 kg
Bronze medal – third place	2013 Qingdao	+78 kg
Bronze medal – third place	2014 Tbilisi	+78 kg
Bronze medal – third place	2014 Havana	+78 kg
Bronze medal – third place	2018 Cancún	+78 kg
Bronze medal – third place	2019 Perth	+78 kg
European Cadet Championships
Bronze medal – third place	2004 Rotterdam	+70 kg

Profile at external databases
- IJF: 4443
- JudoInside.com: 30191
- Updated on 10 November 2022

Ksenia Eduardovna Chibisova (also spelled Kseniya or Kseniia; Russian: Ксения Эдуардовна Чибисова; born 13 July 1988) is a Russian judoka.

Chibisova competed at the 2016 Summer Olympics in Rio de Janeiro, in the women's +78 kg.

Chibisova won a bronze medal at the 2018 World Judo Championships in the mixed team event.
