= 2017 World Judo Championships – Women's +78 kg =

Judo Women's +78 kg at the 2017 World Judo Championships
- Venue: László Papp Budapest Sports Arena
- Location: Budapest, Hungary
- Dates: 2 September
- Competitors: 31 from 26 nations
- Total prize money: 57,000$

Medalists
gold medal	Yu Song (2nd title)	China
silver medal	Sarah Asahina	Japan
bronze medal	Kim Min-jeong	South Korea
bronze medal	Iryna Kindzerska	Azerbaijan

Competition at external databases
- Links: IJF • JudoInside

The Women's +78 kg competition at the 2017 World Judo Championships was held on 2 September 2017.

== Results ==
=== Finals ===
Semi-finals
(Azerbaijan) Iryna Kindzerska	00
(China) Yu Song	01
(Japan) Sarah Asahina	01
(Turkey) Kayra Sayit	00

Final
(China) Yu Song	00
(Japan) Sarah Asahina	00

=== Repechage ===
Repechage
(Bosnia and Herzegovina) Larisa Cerić	00
(South Korea) Kim Min-jeong	10

Third place
(South Korea) Kim Min-jeong	01
(Turkey) Kayra Sayit	00

Repechage
(Netherlands) Tessie Savelkouls	11
(France) Émilie Andéol	00

Third place
(Netherlands) Tessie Savelkouls	00
(Azerbaijan) Iryna Kindzerska	03

=== Pool A ===
First round
(Turkey) Kübra Kara	11
(United States) Nina Cutro-Kelly	00
(Lithuania) Santa Pakenytė	02
(Chinese Taipei) Tsai Jia-wen	00
(Togo) Essohanam Koro	00
(Azerbaijan) Iryna Kindzerska	13

Second round
(Bosnia and Herzegovina) Larisa Cerić	10
(Turkey) Kübra Kara	00
(Lithuania) Santa Pakenytė	00
(Azerbaijan) Iryna Kindzerska	11

Quarterfinals
(Bosnia and Herzegovina) Larisa Cerić	00
(Azerbaijan) Iryna Kindzerska	02

=== Pool B ===
First round
(Brazil) Maria Suelen Altheman	10
(Algeria) Sonia Asselah	00
(China) Yu Song	10
(Hungary) Mercédesz Szigetvári	00
(South Korea) Kim Min-jeong	10
(Ukraine) Anastasiia Sapsai	00
(Kazakhstan) Gulzhan Issanova	10
(Cuba) Elianis Aguilar	00

Second round
(Brazil) Maria Suelen Altheman	00
(China) Yu Song	10
(South Korea) Kim Min-jeong	10
(Kazakhstan) Gulzhan Issanova	00

Quarterfinals
(China) Yu Song	11
(South Korea) Kim Min-jeong	01

=== Pool C ===
First round
(Japan) Sarah Asahina	10
(Cameroon) Hortence Mballa	00
(Russia) Ksenia Chibisova	12
(India) Tulika Maan	00
(Netherlands) Tessie Savelkouls	01
(Mongolia) Munkhtuya Battulga	00
(Hungary) Emese Kárpati	10
(Lithuania) Sandra Jablonskytė	00

Second round
(Japan) Sarah Asahina	11
(Russia) Ksenia Chibisova	00
(Netherlands) Tessie Savelkouls	10
(Hungary) Emese Kárpati	00

Quarterfinals
(Japan) Sarah Asahina	11
(Netherlands) Tessie Savelkouls	00

=== Pool D ===
First round
(Turkey) Kayra Sayit	11
(Croatia) Ivana Šutalo	00
(Georgia (country)) Elene Kebadze	00
(Germany) Jasmin Külbs	10
(France) Émilie Andéol	10
(Kenya) Alice Muragu	00
(China) Ma Sisi	00
(Ukraine) Galyna Tarasova	11

Second round
(Turkey) Kayra Sayit	11
(Germany) Jasmin Külbs	01
(France) Émilie Andéol	01
(Ukraine) Galyna Tarasova	00

Quarterfinals
(Turkey) Kayra Sayit	10
(France) Émilie Andéol	00

== Prize money ==
The sums listed bring the total prizes awarded to 57,000$ for the individual event.

Medal	Total	Judoka	Coach
Gold	26,000$	20,800$	5,200$
Silver	15,000$	12,000$	3,000$
Bronze	8,000$	6,400$	1,600$
