= 2017 European Judo Championships – Women's +78 kg =

Judo competition

Judo Women's +78 kg at the 2017 European Judo Championships
- Venue: Torwar Hall
- Location: Warsaw, Poland
- Date: 22 April
- Competitors: 17 from 15 nations

Medalists
gold medal	Maryna Slutskaya (1st title)	Belarus
silver medal	Svitlana Iaromka	Ukraine
bronze medal	Carolin Weiss	Germany
bronze medal	Larisa Cerić	Bosnia and Herzegovina

Competition at external databases
- Links: IJF • JudoInside

The women's +78 kg competition at the 2017 European Judo Championships in Warsaw was held on 22 April at the Torwar Hall.

== Results ==
=== Finals ===
Semi-finals
Kayra Sayit (TUR)	000
Svitlana Iaromka (UKR)	120
Yelyzaveta Kalanina (UKR)	000
Maryna Slutskaya (BLR)	010

Final
Svitlana Iaromka (UKR)	000
Maryna Slutskaya (BLR)	100

=== Repechages ===
Repechage		Bronze medal
Carolin Weiss (GER)	100
Tessie Savelkouls (NED)	000	Carolin Weiss (GER)	130
		Yelyzaveta Kalanina (UKR)	000

Repechage		Bronze medal
Mercedesz Szigetvári (HUN)	000
Larisa Cerić (BIH)	100	Larisa Cerić (BIH)	100
		Kayra Sayit (TUR)	000

=== Pool A ===
First round	Second round		Quarterfinals
	Kayra Sayit (TUR)	100
	Elene Kebadze (GEO)	00
			Kayra Sayit (TUR)	020
			Carolin Weiss (GER)	010
	Carolin Weiss (GER)	110
	Ivana Šutalo (CRO)	000

=== Pool B ===
First round	Second round		Quarterfinals
	Svitlana Iaromka (UKR)	100
	Sandra Jablonskytė (LTU)	000
			Svitlana Iaromka (UKR)	110
			Tessie Savelkouls (NED)	000
	Tessie Savelkouls (NED)	100
	Emese Kárpáti (HUN)	000

=== Pool C ===
First round	Second round		Quarterfinals
	Émilie Andéol (FRA)	000
	Mercedesz Szigetvári (HUN)	020
			Mercedesz Szigetvári (HUN)	000
			Yelyzaveta Kalanina (UKR)	100
	Santa Pakenytė (LTU)	000
	Yelyzaveta Kalanina (UKR)	110

=== Pool D ===
First round
Ksenia Chibisova (RUS)	020
Kristin Büssow (GER)	000

Second round
Larisa Cerić (BIH)	100
Ivana Maranić (CRO)	000
Maryna Slutskaya (BLR)	100
Ksenia Chibisova (RUS)	000

Quarterfinals
Larisa Cerić (BIH)	000
Maryna Slutskaya (BLR)	010
