= 2018 European Judo Championships – Women's +78 kg =

Judo competition

Judo Women's +78 kg at the 2018 European Judo Championships
- Venue: Expo Tel Aviv
- Location: Tel Aviv, Israel
- Date: 28 April

Medalists
gold medal	Romane Dicko (1st title)	France
silver medal	Larisa Cerić	Bosnia and Herzegovina
bronze medal	Tessie Savelkouls	Netherlands
bronze medal	Yelyzaveta Kalanina	Ukraine

Competition at external databases
- Links: IJF • JudoInside

The women's +78 kg competition at the 2018 European Judo Championships was held on 28 April at the Expo Tel Aviv.

== Results ==
=== Final ===
Final
Larisa Cerić (BIH)	00
Romane Dicko (FRA)	10

=== Repechage ===
Repechage
Ivana Maranić (CRO)	10
Iryna Kindzerska (AZE)	00

Third place
Ivana Maranić (CRO)	00
Tessie Savelkouls (NED)	10

Repechage
Galyna Tarasova (UKR)	11
Kayra Sayit (TUR)	00

Third place
Galyna Tarasova (UKR)	00
Yelyzaveta Kalanina (UKR)	01

=== Top half ===
Quarter-finals
Larisa Cerić (BIH)	10
Sebile Akbulut (TUR)	00
Anamari Velenšek (SLO)	00
Ivana Maranić (CRO)	10
Iryna Kindzerska (AZE)	10
Ksenia Chibisova (RUS)	00
Yelyzaveta Kalanina (UKR)	10
Eleonora Geri (ITA)	00

Quarterfinals
Larisa Cerić (BIH)	10
Ivana Maranić (CRO)	00
Iryna Kindzerska (AZE)	00
Yelyzaveta Kalanina (UKR)	10

Semifinals
Larisa Cerić (BIH)	10
Yelyzaveta Kalanina (UKR)	00

=== Bottom half ===
First round
Tessie Savelkouls (NED)	11
Ivana Šutalo (CRO)	00
Sandra Jablonskytė (LTU)	00
Galyna Tarasova (UKR)	10
Maryna Slutskaya (BLR)	00
Romane Dicko (FRA)	10
Kayra Sayit (TUR)	10
Mercedesz Szigetvári (HUN)	00

Quarterfinals
Tessie Savelkouls (NED)	10
Galyna Tarasova (UKR)	00
Romane Dicko (FRA)	10
Kayra Sayit (TUR)	00

Semifinals
Tessie Savelkouls (NED)	00
Romane Dicko (FRA)	11
