= 2021 European Judo Championships – Women's +78 kg =

Judo Women's +78 kg at the 2021 European Judo Championships
- Venue: Altice Arena
- Location: Lisbon, Portugal
- Date: 18 April
- Competitors: 18 from 14 nations

Medalists
gold medal	Kayra Sayit (2nd title)	Turkey
silver medal	Léa Fontaine	France
bronze medal	Maryna Slutskaya	Belarus
bronze medal	Rochele Nunes	Portugal

Competition at external databases
- Links: IJF • JudoInside

The women's +78 kg competition at the 2021 European Judo Championships was held on 18 April at the Altice Arena.

== Results ==
=== Final ===
Final
Kayra Sayit (TUR)	10
Léa Fontaine (FRA)	00

=== Repechage ===
Repechage
Sandra Jablonskytė (LTU)	10
Larisa Cerić (BIH)	00

Third place
Sandra Jablonskytė (LTU)	00
Maryna Slutskaya (BLR)	10

Repechage
Anne Fatoumata M'Bairo (FRA)	00
Yelyzaveta Kalanina (UKR)	11

Third place
Yelyzaveta Kalanina (UKR)	00
Rochele Nunes (POR)	10

=== Top half ===
Round of 32
Renée Lucht (GER)	10
Ruslana Bulavina (UKR)	00

Round of 16
Iryna Kindzerska (AZE)	00
Léa Fontaine (FRA)	01
Sandra Jablonskytė (LTU)	01
Sara Álvarez (ESP)	00
Rochele Nunes (POR)	10
Renée Lucht (GER)	00
Larisa Cerić (BIH)	10
Helena Vuković (CRO)	00

Quarterfinals
Léa Fontaine (FRA)	10
Sandra Jablonskytė (LTU)	00
Rochele Nunes (POR)	10
Larisa Cerić (BIH)	00

Semifinals
Léa Fontaine (FRA)	11
Rochele Nunes (POR)	00

=== Bottom half ===
Round of 32
Milica Žabić (SRB)	10
Ivana Maranić (CRO)	00

Round of 16
Kayra Sayit (TUR)	10
Anzhela Gasparian (RUS)	00
Anne Fatoumata M'Bairo (FRA)	10
Milica Žabić (SRB)	00
Maryna Slutskaya (BLR)	11
Sophio Somkhishvili (GEO)	00
Yelyzaveta Kalanina (UKR)	10
Samira Bouizgarne (GER)	00

Quarterfinals
Kayra Sayit (TUR)	10
Anne Fatoumata M'Bairo (FRA)	00
Maryna Slutskaya (BLR)	10
Yelyzaveta Kalanina (UKR)	00

Semifinals
Kayra Sayit (TUR)	10
Maryna Slutskaya (BLR)	00
