= 2018 World Judo Championships – Women's +78 kg =

Judo Women's +78 kg at the 2018 World Judo Championships
- Venue: National Gymnastics Arena
- Location: Baku, Azerbaijan
- Dates: 26 September
- Competitors: 33 from 26 nations
- Total prize money: 57,000€

Medalists
gold medal	Sarah Asahina (1st title)	Japan
silver medal	Idalys Ortiz	Cuba
bronze medal	Larisa Cerić	Bosnia and Herzegovina
bronze medal	Kayra Sayit	Turkey

Competition at external databases
- Links: IJF • JudoInside

The Women's +78 kg competition at the 2018 World Judo Championships was held on 26 September 2018.

== Results ==
=== Finals ===
Semi-finals
(Cuba) Idalys Ortiz	01
(Brazil) Maria Suelen Altheman	00
(Bosnia and Herzegovina) Larisa Cerić	00
(Japan) Sarah Asahina	10

Final
(Cuba) Idalys Ortiz	00
(Japan) Sarah Asahina	10

=== Repechage ===
Repechage
(Croatia) Ivana Maranić	00
(United Kingdom) Sarah Adlington	01

Third place
(United Kingdom) Sarah Adlington	00
(Bosnia and Herzegovina) Larisa Cerić	01

Repechage
(Azerbaijan) Iryna Kindzerska	00
(Turkey) Kayra Sayit	10

Third place
(Turkey) Kayra Sayit	01
(Brazil) Maria Suelen Altheman	00

=== Pool A ===
Second round
(South Korea) Kim Min-jeong	00
(Cuba) Idalys Ortiz	10
(China) Wang Yan	10
(Cape Verde) Adysângela Moniz	00
(Ukraine) Yelyzaveta Kalanina	10
(Kazakhstan) Kamila Berlikash	00
(Senegal) Monica Sagna	00
(Croatia) Ivana Maranić	11

Third round
(Cuba) Idalys Ortiz	10
(China) Wang Yan	00
(Ukraine) Yelyzaveta Kalanina	00
(Croatia) Ivana Maranić	10

Quarterfinals
(Cuba) Idalys Ortiz	11
(Croatia) Ivana Maranić	00

=== Pool B ===
First round
(Tunisia) Nihel Cheikh Rouhou	10
(United States) Nina Cutro-Kelly	00

Second round
(Brazil) Maria Suelen Altheman	10
(France) Anne M'Bairo	01
(Germany) Carolin Weiss	10
(Mongolia) Battulga Munkhtuya	00
(Belarus) Maryna Slutskaya	10
(Tunisia) Nihel Cheikh Rouhou	00
(United Kingdom) Sarah Adlington	10
(Bangladesh) Tahamina Lopa	00

Third round
(Brazil) Maria Suelen Altheman	10
(Germany) Carolin Weiss	00
(Belarus) Maryna Slutskaya	00
(United Kingdom) Sarah Adlington	10

Quarterfinals
(Brazil) Maria Suelen Altheman	10
(United Kingdom) Sarah Adlington	00

=== Pool C ===
Second round
(Bosnia and Herzegovina) Larisa Cerić	10
(Slovenia) Anamari Velenšek	00
(Cameroon) Hortence Mballa	00
(Ukraine) Galyna Tarasova	01
(Azerbaijan) Iryna Kindzerska	11
(Lithuania) Sandra Jablonskytė	00
(Puerto Rico) Melissa Mojica	10
(Kazakhstan) Gulzhan Issanova	00

Third round
(Bosnia and Herzegovina) Larisa Cerić	10
(Ukraine) Galyna Tarasova	00
(Azerbaijan) Iryna Kindzerska	10
(Puerto Rico) Melissa Mojica	00

Quarterfinals
(Bosnia and Herzegovina) Larisa Cerić	10
(Azerbaijan) Iryna Kindzerska	00

=== Pool D ===
Second round
(Japan) Sarah Asahina	10
(Croatia) Ivana Šutalo	00
(South Korea) Han Mi-jin	10
(Germany) Kristin Büssow	00
(Brazil) Beatriz Souza	10
(Hungary) Mercédesz Szigetvári	00
(Turkey) Kayra Sayit	10
(China) Su Xin	00

Third round
(Japan) Sarah Asahina	10
(South Korea) Han Mi-jin	00
(Brazil) Beatriz Souza	00
(Turkey) Kayra Sayit	01

Quarterfinals
(Japan) Sarah Asahina	10
(Turkey) Kayra Sayit	00

== Prize money ==
The sums listed bring the total prizes awarded to €57,000 for the individual event.

Medal	Total	Judoka	Coach
Gold	€26,000	€20,800	€5,200
Silver	€15,000	€12,000	€3,000
Bronze	€8,000	€6,400	€1,600
