= 2020 European Judo Championships – Women's +78 kg =

Judo competition

Judo Women's +78 kg at the 2020 European Judo Championships
- Venue: O2 Arena
- Location: Prague, Czech Republic
- Date: 21 November
- Competitors: 12 from 12 nations

Medalists
gold medal	Romane Dicko (2nd title)	France
silver medal	Iryna Kindzerska	Azerbaijan
bronze medal	Rochele Nunes	Portugal
bronze medal	Yelyzaveta Kalanina	Ukraine

Competition at external databases
- Links: IJF • JudoInside

The women's +78 kg competition at the 2020 European Judo Championships was held on 21 November at the O2 Arena.

== Results ==
=== Main bracket ===
Round of 16
Sara Álvarez (ESP)	00
Milica Žabić (SRB)	10
Yelyzaveta Kalanina (UKR)	10
Mercédesz Szigetvári (HUN)	00
Romane Dicko (FRA)	10
Sandra Jablonskytė (LTU)	00
Jasmin Grabowski (GER)	10
Paula Kułaga (POL)	00

Quarterfinals
Iryna Kindzerska (AZE)	11
Milica Žabić (SRB)	00
Rochele Nunes (POR)	00
Yelyzaveta Kalanina (UKR)	10
Kayra Sayit (TUR)	00
Romane Dicko (FRA)	10
Larisa Cerić (BIH)	10
Jasmin Grabowski (GER)	00

Semifinals
Iryna Kindzerska (AZE)	10
Yelyzaveta Kalanina (UKR)	00
Romane Dicko (FRA)	10
Larisa Cerić (BIH)	00

Final
Iryna Kindzerska (AZE)	00
Romane Dicko (FRA)	10

=== Repechage ===
Repechage
Milica Žabić (SRB)	01
Rochele Nunes (POR)	10

Third place
Rochele Nunes (POR)	10
Larisa Cerić (BIH)	00

Repechage
Kayra Sayit (TUR)	00
Jasmin Grabowski (GER)	10

Third place
Jasmin Grabowski (GER)	00
Yelyzaveta Kalanina (UKR)	01
