= 2017 World Judo Open Championships =

Judo competition

Judo 2017 World Judo Open Championships
- Venue: Palais des Congrès
- Location: Marrakesh, Morocco
- Dates: 11–12 November 2017
- Competitors: 58 from 28 nations
- Total prize money: 500,000€

Competition at external databases
- Links: IJF • JudoInside

The 2017 World Judo Open Championships were held in Marrakesh, Morocco from 11 to 12 November 2017.

== Medal overview ==
=== Men's events ===
Event	Gold	Silver	Bronze
Open	Teddy Riner (FRA)	Toma Nikiforov (BEL)	Takeshi Ojitani (JPN)
Open	Teddy Riner (FRA)	Toma Nikiforov (BEL)	Alex Garcia Mendoza (CUB)

=== Women's events ===
Event	Gold	Silver	Bronze
Open	Sarah Asahina (JPN)	Larisa Cerić (BIH)	Nihel Cheikh Rouhou (TUN)
Open	Sarah Asahina (JPN)	Larisa Cerić (BIH)	Idalys Ortiz (CUB)

=== Medals table ===
Rank	Nation	Gold	Silver	Bronze	Total
1	Japan (JPN)	1	0	1	2
2	France (FRA)	1	0	0	1
3	Belgium (BEL)	0	1	0	1
3	Bosnia and Herzegovina (BIH)	0	1	0	1
5	Cuba (CUB)	0	0	2	2
6	Tunisia (TUN)	0	0	1	1
Totals (6 entries)		2	2	4	8

== Tournament results ==
=== Men's event ===
==== Finals ====
Final
Riner (FRA)	02
Nikiforov (BEL)	00

==== Repechage ====
Repechage		Third place playoff
Battulga (MGL)	00
Ojitani (JPN)	11	Ojitani (JPN)	10
		Kageura (JPN)	00

Repechage		Third place playoff
Mikhaylin (RUS)	00
Garcia Mendoza (CUB)	10	Garcia Mendoza (CUB)	02
		Granda (CUB)	00

==== Top Draw ====
Round of 64
Krakovetskii (KGZ)	00
Riner (FRA)	01
Abdallaoui (MAR)	10
Lili (ALG)	00
Elias (LIB)	00
Grol (NED)	10
Malki (MAR)	00
Gordiienko (UKR)	10

Round of 32
Tushishvili (GEO)	00
Riner (FRA)	02
Jaballah (TUN)	01
Brachev (RUS)	00
Simionescu (ROU)	10
Abdallaoui (MAR)	00
Battulga (MGL)	10
Hegyi (AUT)	00
Vakhaviak (BLR)	11
Grol (NED)	00
Ojitani (JPN)	11
Heinle (GER)	00
Gordiienko (UKR)	11
Okruashvili (GEO)	00
Krivobokov (RUS)	00
Granda (CUB)	01

Round of 16
Riner (FRA)	12
Jaballah (TUN)	00
Simionescu (ROU)	00
Battulga (MGL)	10
Vakhaviak (BLR)	00
Ojitani (JPN)	02
Gordiienko (UKR)	01
Granda (CUB)	10

Quarterfinals
Riner (FRA)	10
Battulga (MGL)	00
Ojitani (JPN)	00
Granda (CUB)	10

Semifinals
Riner (FRA)	01
Granda (CUB)	00

==== Bottom Draw ====
Round of 64
Mikhaylin (RUS)	10
Ulziibayar (MGL)	00
Allerstorfer (AUT)	00
Koleśnyk (UKR)	12
Bisultanov (RUS)	01
Horak (CZE)	00
Bor (HUN)	00
Kageura (JPN)	10

Round of 32
Temmar (ALG)	00
Mikhaylin (RUS)	02
Maret (FRA)	12
Sasson (ISR)	00
Matiashvili (GEO)	10
Koleśnyk (UKR)	00
Nikiforov (BEL)	10
Hajji (MAR)	00
Ndiaye (SEN)	00
Garcia Mendoza (CUB)	10
Khammo (UKR)	00
Bisultanov (RUS)	01
Kageura (JPN)	10
Liparteliani (GEO)	00
Meyer (NED)	01
Iliadis (GEO)	00

Round of 16
Mikhaylin (RUS)	01
Maret (FRA)	00
Matiashvili (GEO)	00
Nikiforov (BEL)	11
Garcia Mendoza (CUB)	10
Bisultanov (RUS)	00
Kageura (JPN)	01
Meyer (NED)	00

Quarterfinals
Mikhaylin (RUS)	00
Nikiforov (BEL)	10
Garcia Mendoza (CUB)	00
Kageura (JPN)	10

Semifinals
Nikiforov (BEL)	10
Garcia Mendoza (CUB)	00

=== Women's event ===
==== Repechage ====
Repechage		Third place playoff
Bairo (FRA)	01
Rouhou (TUN)	12	Rouhou (TUN)	01
		Savelkouls (NED)	00

Repechage		Third place playoff
Aguilar (CUB)	00
Dicko (FRA)	10	Dicko (FRA)	00
		Ortiz (CUB)	10

==== Main Draw ====
Round of 32
Sagna (SEN)	00
Atangana (CMR)	10
Shekerova (RUS)	00
Savelkouls (NED)	02

Round of 16
Artoshina (RUS)	00
Asahina (JPN)	11
Bairo (FRA)	11
Kindzerska (AZE)	01
Ortiz (CUB)	10
Atangana (CMR)	00
Galeone (ITA)	00
Rouhou (TUN)	01
Cerić (BIH)	01
Snyman (RSA)	00
Aguilar (CUB)	11
Sokolova (RUS)	00
Niang (MAR)	00
Savelkouls (NED)	10
Dicko (FRA)	10
Kuelbs (GER)	00

Quarterfinals
Asahina (JPN)	11
Bairo (FRA)	00
Ortiz (CUB)	10
Rouhou (TUN)	00
Cerić (BIH)	10
Aguilar (CUB)	00
Savelkouls (NED)	10
Dicko (FRA)	00

Semifinals
Asahina (JPN)	10
Ortiz (CUB)	00
Cerić (BIH)	10
Savelkouls (NED)	00

Final
Asahina (JPN)	12
Cerić (BIH)	00

== Prize money ==
The sums written are per medalist, bringing the total prizes awarded to €500,000.

Medal	Total	Judoka	Coach
Gold	€100,000	€80,000	€20,000
Silver	€50,000	€40,000	€10,000
Bronze	€25,000	€20,000	€5,000
5th place	€10,000	€8,000	€2,000
7th place	€5,000	€4,500	€500
Round of 16	€2,500	€2,250	€250
