= 2018 European Mixed Team Judo Championships =

Judo 2018 European Mixed Team Judo Championships
- Venue: Sports palace Jekaterinburg
- Location: Yekaterinburg, Russia
- Dates: 18 July 2018
- Nations: 21

Medalists
gold medal	Igor Wandtke; Anthony Zingg; Marc Odenthal; Eduard Trippel; Sven Heinle; Amelie Stoll; Theresa Stoll; Szaundra Diedrich; Laura Vargas Koch; Carolin Weiß; Anna-Maria Wagner	Germany
silver medal	Kenneth Henneveld; Bas van Empelen; Jur Spijkers; Dewy Karthaus; Natascha Ausma; Hilde Jager; Ilona Lucassen	Netherlands
bronze medal	Denis Yartsev; Musa Mogushkov; Khusen Khalmurzaev; Ivan Vorobyov; Tamerlan Bashaev; Anton Krivobokov; Anastasia Konkina; Daria Mezhetskaia; Taisia Kireeva; Alena Prokopenko; Aleksandra Babintseva; Ksenia Chibisova	Russia
bronze medal	Hievorh Manukian; Vitalii Shepel; Andrii Koleśnyk; Oleksandr Gordiienko; Mariia Skora; Iryna Khryashchevska; Yelyzaveta Kalanina; Galyna Tarasova	Ukraine

Champions
- Mixed team: Germany (1st title)

Competition at external databases
- Links: IJF • EJU • JudoInside

The 2018 European Mixed Team Judo Championships was held in Yekaterinburg, Russia on 18 July 2018.

== Results ==
=== Final ===
Final
Netherlands	2
Germany	4

=== Repechage ===
Repechage 1
Belarus	2
Austria	4
Azerbaijan	4
Romania	0

Repechage 2
Austria	1
Azerbaijan	4

Third place
Azerbaijan	0
Russia	4

Repechage 1
Ukraine	4
Czech Republic	1
Slovenia	1
Turkey	4

Repechage 2
Ukraine	4
Turkey	2

Third place
Ukraine	4
France	3

=== Top half ===
Round of 32
Belarus	4
Great Britain	2
Serbia	2
Italy	4
Azerbaijan	4
Poland	2

Round of 16
France	4
Belarus	0
Austria	4
Spain	2
Romania	4
Italy	0
Netherlands	4
Azerbaijan	2

Quarterfinals
France	4
Austria	0
Romania	3
Netherlands	4

Semifinals
France	2
Netherlands	4

=== Bottom half ===
Round of 32
Ukraine	4
Hungary	2
Greece	1
Slovenia	4

Round of 16
Russia	4
Ukraine	0
Portugal	1
Czech Republic	4
Germany	4
Slovenia	0
Israel	1
Turkey	4

Quarterfinals
Russia	4
Czech Republic	0
Germany	4
Turkey	1

Semifinals
Russia	1
Germany	4
