= Anne Fatoumata M'Bairo =

French judoka (born 1993)

Personal information
- Born: 8 May 1993 (age 33) Toulon, France
- Occupation: Judoka

Sport
- Country: France
- Sport: Judo
- Weight class: +78 kg

Achievements and titles
- World Champ.: R32 (2018, 2019)
- European Champ.: 7th (2019, 2021)
Medal record
Women's judo
Representing France
World Championships
Silver medal – second place	2018 Baku	Mixed team
Silver medal – second place	2019 Tokyo	Mixed team
European Games
Bronze medal – third place	2019 Minsk	Mixed team
IJF Grand Slam
Silver medal – second place	2018 Abu Dhabi	+78 kg
Silver medal – second place	2019 Ekaterinburg	+78 kg
Silver medal – second place	2019 Abu Dhabi	+78 kg
IJF Grand Prix
Bronze medal – third place	2017 Zagreb	+78 kg
Bronze medal – third place	2018 Tbilisi	+78 kg
Bronze medal – third place	2018 The Hague	+78 kg
Summer Universiade
Bronze medal – third place	2013 Kazan	Women's team
Bronze medal – third place	2017 Taipei	+78 kg

Profile at external databases
- IJF: 11884
- JudoInside.com: 76924
- Updated on 26 November 2022

Anne Fatoumata M'Bairo (born 8 May 1993) is a French judoka.

She participated at the 2018 World Judo Championships, winning a medal.
