= Judo at the 2020 Summer Olympics – Women's +78 kg =

Judo competition

Women's +78 kg at the Games of the XXXII Olympiad
- Venue: Nippon Budokan
- Date: 30 July 2021
- Competitors: 27 from 27 nations

Medalists
1st place, gold medalist(s)		Akira Sone	Japan
2nd place, silver medalist(s)		Idalys Ortiz	Cuba
3rd place, bronze medalist(s)		Iryna Kindzerska	Azerbaijan
3rd place, bronze medalist(s)		Romane Dicko	France

The women's +78 kg competition in judo at the 2020 Summer Olympics in Tokyo was held on 30 July 2021 at the Nippon Budokan.

The medals for the competition were presented by Mustapha Berraf, IOC Member, Algeria; and the medalists' bouquets were presented by Vladimir Barta, IJF Executive Committee Member; Czech Republic, Olympian.

== Results ==
=== Finals ===
Semi-finals
1 Idalys Ortiz (CUB)	01
5 Romane Dicko (FRA)	00
2 Iryna Kindzerska (AZE)	00
3 Akira Sone (JPN)	10

Gold medal
1 Idalys Ortiz (CUB)	00
3 Akira Sone (JPN)	10

=== Repechage ===
Repechage
Xu Shiyan (CHN)	FUS
4 Maria Suelen Altheman (BRA)

Bronze medal
2 Iryna Kindzerska (AZE)	10
Xu Shiyan (CHN)	00

Repechage
Han Mi-jin (KOR)	00
6 Kayra Sayit (TUR)	10

Bronze medal
5 Romane Dicko (FRA)	10
6 Kayra Sayit (TUR)	00

=== Pool A ===
Round of 32
Rochele Nunes (POR)	01
Melissa Mojica (PUR)	00
8 Nihel Cheikh Rouhou (TUN)	10
Sarah Adlington (GBR)	00
Jasmin Grabowski (GER)	00
Xu Shiyan (CHN)	10

Round of 16
1 Idalys Ortiz (CUB)	01
Rochele Nunes (POR)	00
8 Nihel Cheikh Rouhou (TUN)	00
Xu Shiyan (CHN)	10

Quarter-finals
1 Idalys Ortiz (CUB)	10
Xu Shiyan (CHN)	00

=== Pool B ===
Round of 32
Anamari Velenšek (SLO)	11
Nina Cutro-Kelly (USA)	00
Sandra Jablonskytė (LTU)	11
Ivana Maranić (CRO)	00

Round of 16
4 Maria Suelen Altheman (BRA)	10
Anamari Velenšek (SLO)	00
5 Romane Dicko (FRA)	10
Sandra Jablonskytė (LTU)	00

Quarter-finals
4 Maria Suelen Altheman (BRA)	00
5 Romane Dicko (FRA)	11

=== Pool C ===
Round of 32
Izayana Marenco (NCA)	00
Larisa Cerić (BIH)	10
7 Maryna Slutskaya (BLR)	10
Gabriella Wood (TTO)	00
Han Mi-jin (KOR)	01
Tessie Savelkouls (NED)	00

Round of 16
2 Iryna Kindzerska (AZE)	10
Larisa Cerić (BIH)	00
7 Maryna Slutskaya (BLR)	00
Han Mi-jin (KOR)	10

Quarter-finals
2 Iryna Kindzerska (AZE)	11
Han Mi-jin (KOR)	00

=== Pool D ===
Round of 32
Tahani Alqahtani (KSA)	00
Raz Hershko (ISR)	11
6 Kayra Sayit (TUR)	01
Hortence Vanessa Mballa Atangana (CMR)	00
Yelyzaveta Kalanina (UKR)	10
Sonia Asselah (ALG)	00

Round of 16
3 Akira Sone (JPN)	11
Raz Hershko (ISR)	00
6 Kayra Sayit (TUR)	10
Yelyzaveta Kalanina (UKR)	00

Quarter-finals
3 Akira Sone (JPN)	10
6 Kayra Sayit (TUR)	00

== Weigh-in List ==
Weights in table are listed in Kg.

Result	Judoka	Weight
1st place, gold medalist(s)	Akira Sone (JPN)	105.2
2nd place, silver medalist(s)	Idalys Ortiz (CUB)	137.6
3rd place, bronze medalist(s)	Iryna Kindzerska (AZE)	149.5
3rd place, bronze medalist(s)	Romane Dicko (FRA)	121.4
5	Xu Shiyan (CHN)	134.7
5	Kayra Sayit (TUR)	115.3
7	Maria Suelen Altheman (BRA)	118.2
7	Han Mi-jin (KOR)	109.5
9	Rochele Nunes (POR)	117.9
9	Nihel Cheikh Rouhou (TUN)	131.5
9	Anamari Velenšek (SLO)	85.1
9	Sandra Jablonskytė (LTU)	122.1
9	Larisa Cerić (BIH)	101.7
9	Maryna Slutskaya (BLR)	105.1
9	Raz Hershko (ISR)	102.4
9	Yelyzaveta Kalanina (UKR)	109.2
17	Melissa Mojica (PUR)	119.5
17	Sarah Adlington (GBR)	119.2
17	Jasmin Grabowski (GER)	132.9
17	Nina Cutro-Kelly (USA)	109.1
17	Ivana Maranić (CRO)	91.3
17	Izayana Marenco (NCA)	102.9
17	Gabriella Wood (TTO)	136.5
17	Tessie Savelkouls (NED)	88.5
17	Tahani Alqahtani (KSA)	99.7
17	Hortence Vanessa Mballa Atangana (CMR)	115.7
17	Sonia Asselah (ALG)	99.6
