= 2015 in combat sports =

== Amateur boxing ==
=== World boxing championships ===
- May 14 – 24: 2015 Women's Junior/Youth World Boxing Championships in (Chinese Taipei) Taipei
  - Junior: Russia won both the gold and overall medal tallies.
  - Youth: Russia won both the gold and overall medal tallies.
- September 2 – 13: 2015 Junior World Boxing Championships in Saint Petersburg
  - Russia won five (out of 13) events in these championships.
- October 5 – 15: 2015 AIBA World Boxing Championships in (Qatar) Doha
  - Cuba won both the gold and overall medal tallies.

=== AIBA confederations ===
- May 15 – 24: 2015 EUBC European Confederation Junior Boxing Championships in Lviv
  - Host nation, Ukraine, won both the gold and overall medal tallies.
- June 7 – 14: 2015 ASBC Asian Confederation Junior Boxing Championships in Tashkent
  - Host nation, Uzbekistan, won both the gold and overall medal tallies.
- June 25 – 30: 2015 AMBC American Confederation Junior Boxing Championships in San José, Costa Rica
  - 46 kg winner: (Puerto Rico) Abner Figueroa
  - 48 kg winner: (Costa Rica) Taylor Lopez
  - 54 kg winner: (Dominican Republic) José Núñez
  - 57 kg winner: (Dominican Republic) Eury Cedeño
  - 75 kg winner: (Guatemala) José Carlos Lopez Quintanilla
  - The Dominican Republic won the gold medal tally. Costa Rica won the overall medal tally.
- August 6 – 15: 2015 ASBC Asian Confederation Women's Boxing Championships in Wūlánchábù
  - China won six (out of 10) gold medals in this event.
- August 7 – 15: 2015 EUBC European Confederation Boxing Championships in (Bulgaria) Samokov
  - Russia won the gold medal tally. Great Britain won the overall medal tally.
- August 15 – 24: 2015 EUBC European Confederation Women's Junior / Youth Boxing Championships in (Hungary) Keszthely
  - Junior: Russia won both the gold and overall medal tallies.
  - Youth: Russia won both the gold and overall medal tallies.
- August 17 – 22: 2015 AMBC American Confederation Boxing Championships in (Venezuela) Vargas
  - Cuba won seven, out of ten, weight classes in this event.
- August 18 – 24: 2015 AFBC African Confederation Boxing Championships in Casablanca
  - Morocco won five, out of ten, weight classes in this event.
- August 26 – September 5: 2015 ASBC Asian Confederation Boxing Championships in (Thailand) Bangkok
  - Kazakhstan won the gold medal tally. Uzbekistan won the overall medal tally.
- August 29 – September 1: 2015 OCBC Oceania Confederation Boxing Championships in Canberra
  - Australia won both the gold and overall medal tallies.
- November 20 – 29: 2015 EUBC European Confederation Youth Boxing Championships in (Poland) Kołobrzeg
  - Russia won both the gold and overall medal tallies.

=== 2016 Summer Olympics ===
- December 4 – 6: Aquece Rio International Boxing Tournament 2015 in Brazil (Olympic Test Event)
  - Brazil and Great Britain won 3 gold medals each. Brazil won the overall medal tally.

== Fencing ==
- October 4, 2014 – October 25, 2015: 2014–15 FIE events season

=== FIE World championships ===
- April 1 – 9: 2015 World Junior and Cadets Fencing Championships in (Uzbekistan) Tashkent
- Junior Men
  - Men's Junior Individual Épée winner: (France) Hippolyte Bouillot
  - Men's Junior Team Épée winners: Germany
  - Men's Junior Individual Foil winner: (Italy) Damiano Rosatelli
  - Men's Junior Team Foil winners: Italy
  - Men's Junior Individual Sabre winner: (United States) Eli Dershwitz
  - Men's Junior Team Sabre winners: South Korea
- Junior Women
  - Women's Junior Individual Épée winner: (France) Coraline Vitalis
  - Women's Junior Team Épée winners: Italy
  - Women's Junior Individual Foil winner: (United States) Sara Taffel
  - Women's Junior Team Foil winners: Italy
  - Women's Junior Individual Sabre winner: (France) Caroline Queroli
  - Women's Junior Team Sabre winners: Italy
- Cadet Men
  - Men's Cadet Individual Épée winner: (South Korea) KIM Myeong-ki
  - Men's Cadet Individual Foil winner: (United States) Sam Moelis
  - Men's Cadet Individual Sabre winner: (South Korea) KIM Dong-ju
- Cadet Women
  - Women's Cadet Individual Épée winner: (Romania) Alexandra Predescu
  - Women's Cadet Individual Foil winner: (Germany) Leonie Ebert
  - Women's Cadet Individual Sabre winner: (Russia) Olga Nikitina
- July 13 – 19: 2015 World Fencing Championships in Moscow
  - Russia and Italy won 4 gold medals each. Russia won the overall medal tally.
- October 20 – 25: 2015 World Veterans Fencing Championships in (France) Limoges
  - The United States won both the gold and overall medal tallies.

=== FIE Continental championships ===
- April 17 – 26: 2015 Pan American Fencing Championships in (Chile) Santiago
  - The United States won both the gold and overall medal tallies.
- June 6 – 11: 2015 European Fencing Championships in (Switzerland) Montreux
  - Italy, Russia, and France won 3 gold medals each. Italy won the overall medal tally.
- June 11 – 16: 2015 African Fencing Championships in Cairo
  - Tunisia won the gold medal tally. Egypt and Tunisia won 15 overall medals each.
- June 25 – 30: 2015 Asian Fencing Championships in Singapore
  - South Korea won both the gold and overall medal tallies.

=== FIE Grand Prix ===
- November 28, 2014 – May 31, 2015: 2014–15 FIE Grand Prix events

==== Épée ====
- December 5 – 7, 2014: 2015 Qatar Grand Prix in Doha
  - Men's winner: (France) Daniel Jerent
  - Women's winner: (Romania) Simona Gherman
- March 20 – 22: Hungarian Grand Prix in (Hungary) Budapest
  - Men's winner: (Estonia) Nikolai Novosjolov
  - Women's winner: (South Korea) Shin A-lam
- May 22 – 24: Brazilian Grand Prix in (Brazil) Rio de Janeiro
  - Men's winner: (France) Yannick Borel
  - Women's winner: (Italy) Francesca Boscarelli

==== Foil ====
- November 28 – 30, 2014: Italian Grand Prix in (Italy) Turin
  - Men's winner: (Russia) Aleksey Cheremisinov
  - Women's winner: (Italy) Arianna Errigo
- March 13 – 15: Cuban Grand Prix in (Cuba) Havana
  - Men's winner: (Russia) Dmitry Rigin
  - Women's winner: (Italy) Elisa Di Francisca
- May 16 & 17: Chinese Grand Prix in (China) Shanghai
  - Men's winner: (United States) Miles Chamley-Watson
  - Women's winner: (Italy) Elisa Di Francisca

==== Sabre ====
- December 13 & 14, 2014: US Grand Prix in (United States) New York City
  - Men's winner: (South Korea) Kim Jung-hwan
  - Women's winner: (Ukraine) Olga Kharlan
- March 28 & 29: Korean Grand Prix in (South Korea) Seoul
  - Men's winner: (Germany) Nicolas Limbach
  - Women's winner: (Ukraine) Olga Kharlan
- May 30 & 31: Russian Grand Prix in (Russia) Moscow
  - Men's winner: (Romania) Tiberiu Dolniceanu
  - Women's winner: (Ukraine) Olga Kharlan

=== FIE World Cup ===
- October 17, 2014 – May 3, 2015: 2014–15 Fencing World Cup

==== Men's Épée ====
(Individual and Team events)

- October 24 – 26, 2014: Swiss World Cup in (Switzerland) Bern
  - Winner: (France) Jean-Michel Lucenay
  - Team winners: France
- November 14 – 16, 2014: Glaive de Tallinn in Estonia
  - Winner: (France) Gauthier Grumier
  - Team winners: South Korea
- January 22 – 24: Heidenheimer Pokal in (Germany) Heidenheim, Bavaria
  - Winner: (Switzerland) Max Heinzer
  - Team winners: South Korea
- February 13 – 15: Canadian World Cup in (Canada) Vancouver
  - Winner: (France) Ronan Gustin
  - Team winners: Switzerland
- May 1 – 3: Challenge Monal in Paris
  - Winner: (France) Alexandre Blaszyck
  - Team winners: France

==== Women's Épée ====
(Individual and Team events)

- October 24 – 26, 2014: Italian World Cup in (Italy) Legnano
  - Winner: (Ukraine) Anfisa Pochkalova
  - Team winners: Estonia
- November 14 – 16, 2014: Chinese World Cup in Xuzhou
  - Winner: (Hungary) Emese Szász
  - Team winners: China
- January 23 – 25: Spanish World Cup in (Spain) Barcelona
  - Winner: (China) Xu Anqi
  - Team winners: Sweden
- February 13 – 15: Argentinian World Cup in (Argentina) Buenos Aires
  - Winner: (Tunisia) Sarra Besbes
  - Team winners: Italy
- May 1 – 3: South African World Cup in (South Africa) Johannesburg
  - Winner: (China) Sun Yujie
  - Team winners: China

==== Men's Foil ====
(Individual and Team events)

- October 17 – 19, 2014: American World Cup in (United States) San Francisco
  - Winner: (France) Jérémy Cadot
  - Team winners: Italy
- November 7 – 9, 2014: Prince Takamodo WC in (Japan) Tokyo
  - Winner: (United States) Race Imboden
  - Team winners: Russia
- January 16 – 18: Challenge International de Paris in France
  - Winner: (United States) Race Imboden
  - Team winners: United States
- February 6 – 8: Löwe von Bonn in Germany
  - Winner: (Italy) Andrea Cassarà
  - Team winners: France
- May 1 – 3: Fleuret de St-Petersbourg in Russia
  - Winner: (Russia) Dmitry Rigin
  - Team winners: Russia

==== Women's Foil ====
(Individual and Team events)

- October 17 – 19, 2014: Mexican World Cup in (Mexico) Cancún
  - Winner: (Italy) Arianna Errigo
  - Team winners: Russia
- November 7 – 9, 2014: French World Cup in (France) Saint-Maur-des-Fossés
  - Winner: (Italy) Arianna Errigo
  - Team winners: Russia
- January 16 – 18: The Artus Court PKO BP in (Poland) Gdańsk
  - Winner: (France) Astrid Guyart
  - Team winners: Russia
- February 6 – 8: Algerian World Cup in (Algeria) Algiers
  - Winner: (United States) Lee Kiefer
  - Team winners: Italy
- May 1 – 3: Reinhold-Würth-Cup in (Germany) Tauberbischofsheim
  - Winner: (Italy) Elisa Di Francisca
  - Team winners: Russia

==== Men's Sabre ====
(Individual and Team events)

- November 1 & 2, 2014: Senegalese World Cup in (Senegal) Dakar
  - Cancelled for unknown reasons.
- November 21 – 23, 2014: Hungarian World Cup in (Hungary) Budapest
  - Winner: (South Korea) Gu Bon-gil
  - Team winners: Romania
- January 31 & February 1: Trophée Luxardo in (Italy) Padua
  - Winner: (Russia) Kamil Ibragimov
  - Team winners: Russia
- February 20 – 22: Sabre de Wolodyjowski in (Poland) Warsaw
  - Winner: (South Korea) Gu Bon-gil
  - Team winners: France
- May 1 – 3: Spanish World Cup in (Spain) Madrid
  - Winner: (South Korea) Gu Bon-gil
  - Team winners: Hungary

==== Women's Sabre ====
(Individual and Team events)

- November 1 & 2, 2014: Venezuelan World Cup in (Venezuela) Isla Margarita
  - Winner: (Russia) Sofiya Velikaya
  - Team winners: United States
- November 21 – 23, 2014: Trophée BNP-Paribas in (France) Orléans
  - Winner: (Russia) Sofiya Velikaya
  - Team winners: Russia
- January 30 – February 1: Greek World Cup in (Greece) Athens
  - Winner: (Ukraine) Olha Kharlan
  - Team winners: Ukraine
- February 21 & 22: Challenge Yves Brasseur in (Belgium) Ghent
  - Winner: (Russia) Sofiya Velikaya
  - Team winners: Italy
- May 2 & 3: Chinese World Cup in (China) Beijing
  - Winner: (Russia) Sofiya Velikaya
  - Team winners: France

=== Wheelchair fencing World Cup & Championships ===
- May 1 – December 21: 2015 IWASF Wheelchair Fencing World Cup
  - May 1 – 3: World Cup #1 in (Canada) Montreal
    - For results, click here.
  - May 22 – 24: World Cup #2 in (Italy) Pisa
    - For results, click here.
  - July 9 – 12: World Cup #3 in (Poland) Warsaw
    - For results, click here.
  - October 22 – 25: World Cup #4 in (France) Paris
    - For results, click here.
  - December 14 – 21: World Cup #5 (final) in (United Arab Emirates) Sharjah
    - For the U17 results, click here.
    - For the U23 results, click here.
    - For the World Cup results, click here.
- April 27 – 29: Americas Regional Championships in (Canada) Montreal
  - For results, click here.
- July 4 – 7: U23 World Cup in (Netherlands) Stadskanaal
  - For results, click here.
- September 17 – 24: 2015 IWASF Wheelchair Fencing World Championships in (Hungary) Eger
  - For results, click here.

=== Other fencing events ===
- February 3–8: CPE Cadet & Junior American Championships 2015 in (Canada) Toronto
  - United States won both the gold and overall medal tallies.
- February 24 – March 5: Fencing EFC Cadet & Junior European Championships 2015 in (Slovenia) Maribor
  - Russia won both the gold and overall medal tallies.
- February 28 – March 9: Fencing FCA Cadet & Junior Asian Championships 2015 in (United Arab Emirates) Abu Dhabi
  - Japan won both the gold and overall medal tallies.
- March 1–5: Fencing CAE Cadet & Junior African Championships 2015 in (Algeria) Algiers
  - Egypt won both the gold and overall medal tallies.
- April 22–26: Fencing EFC Under 23 European Championships 2015 in Vicenza
  - Italy won both the gold and overall medal tallies.

== Judo ==
=== World judo championships ===
- August 5 – 9: 2015 World Cadet Judo Championships in (Bosnia and Herzegovina) Sarajevo
  - Japan won the gold medal tally. Russia won the overall medal tally.
- August 24 – 30: 2015 World Judo Championships in (Kazakhstan) Astana
  - Japan won both the gold and overall medal tallies.
- September 21 – 24: 2015 Kata and Veterans World Judo Championships in (Netherlands) Amsterdam
  - Nage-no-kata winners: (Japan) Michito Sakamoto / Takayuki Yokoyama
  - Katame-no-kata winners: (Japan) Satoshi Nakayama / Seiji Hayashi
  - Juno kata winners: (Japan) Megumi Shirano / Hikaru Shirano
  - Kime-no-kata winners: (Japan) Kenji Takeishi / Koji Uematsu
  - Goshin jutsu winners: (Japan) Hideki Miyamoto / Masaki Watanabe
  - Veterans Day 1 results, click here.
  - Veterans Day 2 results, click here.
  - Veterans Day 3 results, click here.
  - Veterans Day 4 results, click here.
- October 23 – 27: 2015 World Junior Judo Championships in (United Arab Emirates) Abu Dhabi
  - Japan won both the gold and overall medal tallies.

=== Judo Grand Slam ===
- May 8 – December 6: 2015 Judo Grand Slam events
  - May 8 – 10: Grand Slam #1 in Baku
    - Azerbaijan, Romania, and Russia won 2 gold medals each. Russia, the Netherlands, and Germany won 5 overall medals each.
  - July 18 & 19: Grand Slam #2 in Tyumen
    - Japan won the gold medal tally. Russia won the overall medal tally.
  - October 17 & 18: Grand Slam #3 in (France) Paris
    - Japan won both the gold and overall medal tallies.
  - October 30 – November 1: Grand Slam #4 in (United Arab Emirates) Abu Dhabi
    - South Korea won the gold medal tally. The Netherlands and Germany won 6 overall medals each.
  - December 5 & 6: Grand Slam #5 (final) in Tokyo
    - Japan won both the gold and overall medal tallies.

=== Judo Grand Prix ===
- February 20 – November 28: 2015 Judo Grand Prix events
  - February 20 – 22: Grand Prix #1 in (Germany) Düsseldorf
    - Japan won both the gold and overall medal tallies.
  - March 20 – 22: Grand Prix #2 in (Georgia (country)) Tbilisi
    - Azerbaijan, Georgia, and Mongolia won 2 gold medals each. Germany won the overall medal tally.
  - March 27 – 29: Grand Prix #3 in (Turkey) Samsun
    - Four nations won 2 gold medals each. The Netherlands and Germany won 5 overall medals each.
  - May 1 – 3: Grand Prix #4 in (Croatia) Zagreb
    - Four nations won 2 gold medals each. Germany won the overall medal tally.
  - June 13 & 14: Grand Prix #5 in (Hungary) Budapest
    - Kazakhstan won the gold medal tally. Germany won the overall medal tally.
  - July 3 – 5: Grand Prix #6 in Ulaanbaatar
    - Mongolia won both the gold and overall medal tallies.
  - October 1 – 3: Grand Prix #7 in Tashkent
    - Japan won the gold medal tally. Uzbekistan won the overall medal tally.
  - November 20 – 22: Grand Prix #8 in (China) Qingdao
    - Japan won both the gold and overall medal tallies.
  - November 26 – 28: Grand Prix #9 (final) in Jeju City
    - South Korea won both the gold and overall medal tallies.

=== European Judo Union (EJU) ===
- February 7 – October 11: 2015 European Open events
  - February 7 & 8: European Open #1 in (Bulgaria) Sofia
    - Japan won both the gold and overall medal tallies.
  - February 14 & 15: European Open #2 in (Austria) Oberwart (women only)
    - Japan won both the gold and overall medal tallies.
  - February 14 & 15: European Open #3 in (Italy) Rome (men only)
    - Japan won both the gold and overall medal tallies.
  - February 28: European Open #4 in (Czech Republic) Prague (women only)
    - Seven different nations won one gold medal each. China and South Korea won 4 overall medals each.
  - February 28 & March 1: European Open #5 in (Poland) Warsaw (men only)
    - South Korea won the gold medal tally. Brazil, Uzbekistan, and South Korea won 5 overall medals each.
  - May 30 & 31: European Open #6 in (Romania) Cluj-Napoca
    - Four different nations won 2 gold medals each. France and the Netherlands won 7 overall medals each.
  - June 6 & 7: European Open #7 in (Belarus) Minsk
    - France won the gold medal tally. Germany won the overall medal tally.
  - October 10 & 11: European Open #8 (co-final) in (United Kingdom) Glasgow (men only)
    - France and the Netherlands won 2 gold medals each. Great Britain won the overall medal tally.
  - October 10 & 11: European Open #9 (co-final) in (Portugal) Lisbon (women only)
    - Germany, the Netherlands, and Kosovo won 2 gold medals each. Great Britain and Russia won 4 overall medals each.

==== European Judo Cup ====
- March 7 – November 1: 2015 European Judo Cup events
  - March 7 & 8: European Judo Cup #1 in (Switzerland) Zürich-Uster
    - Japan won both the gold and overall medal tallies.
  - March 21 & 22: European Judo Cup #2 in (Bosnia and Herzegovina) Sarajevo
    - France won both the gold and overall medal tallies.
  - May 16 & 17: European Judo Cup #3 in Orenburg
    - Russia won both the gold and overall medal tallies.
  - June 13 & 14: European Judo Cup #4 in (Slovenia) Celje
    - Russia won both the gold and overall medal tallies.
  - July 11 & 12: European Judo Cup #5 in (United Kingdom) London
    - Great Britain won both the gold and overall medal tallies.
  - July 18 & 19: European Judo Cup #6 in Sindelfingen
    - The Netherlands won the gold medal tally. Germany won the overall medal tally.
  - September 5 & 6: European Judo Cup #7 in Bratislava
    - Poland, the Czech Republic, Slovakia, and France won 2 gold medals each. Poland won the overall medal tally.
  - September 26 & 27: European Judo Cup #8 in (Serbia) Belgrade
    - France won both the gold and overall medal tallies.
  - October 3 & 4: European Judo Cup #9 in Tampere
    - Russia won the gold medal tally. Finland won the overall medal tally.
  - October 17 & 18: European Judo Cup #10 in (Croatia) Dubrovnik
    - Russia won both the gold and overall medal tallies.
  - October 24 & 25: European Judo Cup #11 in (Sweden) Lund
    - France won both the gold and overall medal tallies.
  - October 31 & November 1: European Judo Cup #12 (final) in (Spain) Málaga
    - Germany won both the gold and overall medal tallies.

=== Pan American Judo Confederation (CPJ) ===
- March 7 – August 2: 2015 Pan American Open events
  - March 7 & 8: Pan American Open #1 in (Chile) Santiago
    - Russia won both the gold and overall medal tallies.
  - March 14 & 15: Pan American Open #2 in (Uruguay) Montevideo
    - Russia won the gold medal tally. Brazil won the overall medal tally.
  - March 21 & 22: Pan American Open #3 in (Argentina) Buenos Aires
    - Brazil won both the gold and overall medal tallies.
  - June 27 & 28: Pan American Open #4 (final) in (El Salvador) San Salvador
    - Canada won both the gold and overall medal tallies.

=== African Judo Union (AJU) ===
- January 17 – November 8: 2015 African Open events
  - January 17 & 18: African Open #1 in (Tunisia) Tunis
    - France won both the gold and overall medal tallies.
  - March 14 & 15: African Open #2 in (Morocco) Casablanca
    - France won both the gold and overall medal tallies.
  - November 7 & 8: African Open #3 (final) in (Mauritius) Port Louis
    - Russia won both the gold and overall medal tallies.

=== Other judo competitions ===
- April 10 – 12: 2015 Oceania Judo Championships in Païta, South Province, New Caledonia
  - Senior: Australia won both the gold and overall medal tallies.
  - Cadet: Australia won both the gold and overall medal tallies.
  - Junior: Australia won both the gold and overall medal tallies.
- April 23 – 25: 2015 Pan American Judo Championships in (Canada) Edmonton
  - Brazil won both the gold and overall medal tallies.
- April 23 – 26: 2015 African Judo Championships in (Gabon) Libreville
  - Tunisia won the gold medal tally. Tunisia and Algeria won 13 overall medals each.
- May 13 – 17: 2015 Asian Judo Championships in Kuwait City
  - Japan won both the gold and overall medal tallies.
- May 23 & 24: 2015 World Masters Judo Championships in (Morocco) Rabat
  - Japan won both the gold and overall medal tallies.
- May 23 & 24: 2015 European Kata Championships in Herstal
  - Belgium and Italy won 3 gold medals each. Italy won the overall medal tally.
- May 28 – 31: 2015 European Veterans Judo Championships in (Hungary) Balatonfüred
  - Russia won the gold medal tally. France won the overall medal tally.
- June 25 – 28: 2015 European Judo Championships in (Azerbaijan) Baku (part of the European Games)
  - France, the Netherlands, and Russia won 3 gold medals each. Germany won the overall medal tally.
- July 3 – 5: 2015 European Cadets Judo Championships in (Bulgaria) Sofia
  - Individual: Russia won the gold medal tally. Russia and Georgia won 10 overall medals each.
  - Team: Russia and Georgia each won a gold medal each.
- July 25 & 26: Asian Open in (Chinese Taipei) Taipei
  - South Korea won both the gold and overall medal tallies.
- September 18 – 20: 2015 European Junior Judo Championships in (Austria) Oberwart
  - The Netherlands won the gold medal tally. Russia won the overall medal tally.
- November 13 – 15: 2015 European U23 Judo Championships in (Slovakia) Bratislava
  - Russia and Germany won 3 gold medals each. Russia won the overall medal tally.
- November 14 & 15: Oceania Open in (Australia) Wollongong
  - Great Britain won both the gold and overall medal tallies.
- December 19: 2015 European Club Judo Championships in (Georgia (country)) Tbilisi
  - Men's team winners: (Georgia (country)) Sagarejo
  - Women's team winners: (Netherlands) JTS NOORD-OOST

== Taekwondo ==
=== WTF ===
- January 16 – December 6: 2015 WTF Open and Other Events Calendar
  - January 16 – 18: 2015 Greek Open in Thessaloniki
    - Men's -54 kg winner: (Greece) Sotirios Boutios
    - Men's -58 kg winner: (Germany) Levent Tuncat
    - Men's -63 kg winner: (Belgium) Jaouad Achab
    - Men's -68 kg winner: (United Kingdom) Anthony Stephenson
    - Men's -74 kg winner: (Portugal) Júlio Ferreira
    - Men's -80 kg winner: (Italy) Roberto Botta
    - Men's -87 kg winner: (Austria) Ahmad Mohammadi
    - Men's Heavyweight (+87 kg) winner: (Iran) Sajjad Mardani
    - Women's -46 kg winner: (Cyprus) Kyriaki Kuottouki
    - Women's -49 kg winner: (Serbia) Tijana Bogdanović
    - Women's -53 kg winner: (Belgium) Indra Craen
    - Women's -57 kg winner: (Germany) Anna-Lena Frömming
    - Women's -62 kg winner: (Spain) Marta Calvo Gómez
    - Women's -67 kg winner: (Serbia) Ana Bajić
    - Women's -73 kg winner: (Croatia) Iva Radoš
    - Women's Heavyweight (+73 kg) winner: (Poland) Aleksandra Kowalczuk
      - Croatia, Germany, and Serbia won 2 gold medals each. Host nation, Greece, and Turkey won 7 overall medals each.
  - January 20 – 25: 2015 US Open in Orlando, Florida
    - Men's -54 kg winner: (Brazil) Venilton Teixeira
    - Men's -58 kg winner: (Chinese Taipei) Cheng Ching Huang
    - Men's -63 kg winner: (China) Zhao Shuai
    - Men's -68 kg winner: (Spain) José Antonio Rosillo
    - Men's -74 kg winner: (United States) TJ Curry
    - Men's -80 kg winner: (United Kingdom) Damon Sansum
    - Men's -87 kg winner: (United Kingdom) Lutalo Muhammad
    - Men's Heavyweight (+87 kg) winner: (Niger) Abdoula Issoufou Alfaga
    - Women's -46 kg winner: (Chinese Taipei) Lin Wan-ting
    - Women's -49 kg winner: (China) Wenren Yuntao
    - Women's -53 kg winner: (Chinese Taipei) Huang Yun-wen
    - Women's -57 kg winner: (United States) Cheyenne Lewis
    - Women's -62 kg winner: (China) Hua Zhang
    - Women's -67 kg winner: (China) Guo Yunfei
    - Women's -73 kg winner: (Netherlands) Reshmie Oogink
    - Women's Heavyweight (+73 kg) winner: (Poland) Aleksandra Kowalczuk
      - China won the gold medal tally. Host nation, the United States, won the overall medal tally.
  - January 31 & February 1: 2015 Bosnia Open in (Bosnia and Herzegovina) Sarajevo
    - Croatia won both the gold and overall medal tallies.
  - February 5 – 7: 2015 Fujairah Open in the United Arab Emirates
    - Iran won the gold medal tally. Iran and Kazakhstan won 11 overall medals each.
  - February 10 & 11: 2015 European Taekwondo Club Championships in Antalya
    - Croatia won the gold medal tally. Host nation, Turkey, won the overall medal tally.
  - February 13 – 15: 2015 Turkish Open in Antalya
    - Host nation, Turkey, won both the gold and overall medal tallies.
  - February 13 – 15: 2015 Canada Open in Toronto
    - Mexico won both the gold and overall medal tallies.
  - February 13 – 15: 2015 Asian Clubs Taekwondo Championships in (Iran) Tehran
    - Overall club winner: (Iran) Shehrdari Varamin
  - February 16 – 18: 2015 Fajr Open in Tehran
    - Iran won both the gold and overall medal tallies.
  - February 20 – 22: 2015 African Taekwondo Union (AFTU) International Open in (Egypt) Alexandria
    - Brazil and Spain won 4 gold medals each. France won the overall medal tally.
  - February 27 – March 1: 2015 Luxor Open in Egypt
    - Spain won the gold medal tally. Russia won the overall medal tally.
  - March 6 – 9: 2015 Qatar Open in Doha (debut event)
    - South Korea won both the gold and overall medal tallies.
  - March 7 & 8: 2015 Swiss Open in Clarens, Switzerland
    - Five nations won 2 gold medals each. Germany won the overall medal tally.
  - March 13 – 15: 2015 Mexican Open in Aguascalientes
    - Host nation, Mexico, won both the gold and overall medal tallies.
  - March 13 – 15: 2015 Dutch Open in (Netherlands) Eindhoven
    - Great Britain, Iran, and Serbia won 2 gold medals each. Iran and Russia won 4 overall medals each.
  - May 29 – 31: 2015 Paraguay Open in Asunción
    - Brazil and South Korea won 4 gold medals each. Brazil won the overall medal tally.
  - June 5 – 7: 2015 Bolivia Open in Santa Cruz de la Sierra
    - Mexico and South Korea won 4 gold medals each. Brazil won the overall medal tally.
  - June 26 – 28: 2015 Australian Open in (Australia) Melbourne
    - South Korea won both the gold and overall medal tallies.
  - September 3 – 6: 2015 Indonesian Open in Pekanbaru
    - Senior: South Korea won both the gold and overall medal tallies.
    - Junior: Indonesia won both the gold and overall medal tallies.
  - September 6 & 7: 2015 Israel Open in Ramla
    - Spain and Russia won 3 gold medals each. Russia won the overall medal tally.
  - October 25 – 28: 2015 Kazakhstan Open in Almaty
    - South Korea won the gold medal tally. Kazakhstan won the overall medal tally.
- March 25 – 29: 2015 European Championships Olympic Weight Categories in Nalchik
  - Turkey won the gold medal tally. Host nation, Russia, won the overall medal tally.
- April 11 – 14: 2015 Asian Junior Taekwondo and Poomsae Championships in (Chinese Taipei) Taipei
  - South Korea won both the gold and overall medal tallies.
- April 14 – 16: 2015 Asian Cadet Taekwondo Championships in (Chinese Taipei) Taipei (debut event)
  - Iran won both the gold and overall medal tallies.
- August 14 – 16: WTF World Grand Prix Moscow 2015 in Russia
  - South Korea won both the gold and overall medal tallies.
- September 11 – 13: 2015 Pan American Open Taekwondo Championships in Aguascalientes
  - Mexico won both the gold and overall medal tallies.
- September 18 – 20: WTF World Grand Prix Samsun 2015 in Turkey
  - Russia won the gold medal tally. Iran won the overall medal tally.
- October 8 – 11: 2015 Taekwondo XVII Open Cidade Maravilhosa Internacional in Rio de Janeiro
  - Brazil won both the gold and overall medal tallies.
- October 16 – 18: WTF World Grand Prix Manchester 2015 in Great Britain
  - China won the gold medal tally. Iran and South Korea won 4 overall medals each.
- December 5 & 6: WTF World Grand Prix Mexico City Final 2015 in Mexico
  - China and South Korea won 2 gold medals each. Mexico won the overall medal tally.

=== WTF World Championships ===
- May 12 – 18: 2015 World Taekwondo Championships in Chelyabinsk
  - South Korea won the gold medal tally. Russia won the overall medal tally.
  - Men's overall team point winners: Iran
  - Women's overall team point winners: South Korea
- August 23 – 26: 2015 WTF World Cadet Taekwondo Championships in (South Korea) Seolcheon-myeon, Muju County
  - Iran won both the gold and overall medal tallies.

==== WTF Para-Taekwondo championships ====
- April 17: 2015 Asian Para-Taekwondo Championships in (Chinese Taipei) Taipei (debut event)
  - Iran won both the gold and overall medal tallies.
- April 20: 2015 European Para-Taekwondo Championships in (Moldova) Chișinău
  - Russia won both the gold and overall medal tallies.
- September 15 – 17: 2015 WTF World Para-Taekwondo Championships in (Turkey) Samsun
  - For results, click here.

== Wrestling ==
- January 3 – December 18: 2015 United World Wrestling Calendar of Events

=== January WRL ===
- January 3 & 4: Nordhagen Classic 2015 in Calgary
  - Junior Women's Freestyle: The United States won the gold medal tally. Canada and the United States won 7 overall medals each.
  - Senior Women's Freestyle: Canada won both the gold and overall medal tallies.
- January 10: XXXVI Herman Kare 2015 in Kouvola
  - Greco-Roman: Russia won the gold medal tally. Host nation, Finland, won the overall medal tally.
- January 22 – 26: Golden Grand Prix Ivan Yarygin 2015 in Krasnoyarsk
  - Men's Freestyle: Russia won both the gold and overall medal tallies.
  - Women's Freestyle: Russia won both the gold and overall medal tallies.
- January 28 – 31: Dave Schultz Memorial 2015 in Colorado Springs, Colorado
  - Men's Freestyle: The United States won both the gold and overall medal tallies.
  - Women's Freestyle: The United States won both the gold and overall medal tallies.
  - Greco-Roman: Kazakhstan won the gold medal tally. The United States won the overall medal tally.
- January 29 & 30: Yadegar Imam Cup 2015 in Mashhad
  - Cadet Men's Freestyle: Iran won both the gold and overall medal tallies.
  - Cadet Greco-Roman: Iran won both the gold and overall medal tallies.

=== February WRL ===
- February 6 & 7: 24th Flatz Open in (Austria) Wolfurt
  - Junior Men's Freestyle: Germany won the gold medal tally. Poland won the overall medal tally.
  - Cadet Men's Freestyle: Sweden won the gold medal tally. Poland won the overall medal tally.
  - Junior Women's Freestyle: Mongolia won the gold medal tally. Poland won the overall medal tally.
- February 6 – 8: Aarhus Open 2015 in Denmark
  - Junior Greco-Roman: The Czech Republic and Norway won 2 gold medals each. Host nation, Denmark, won the overall medal tally.
  - Cadet Greco-Roman: The Czech Republic and Germany won 3 gold medals each. The Czech Republic won the overall medal tally.
- February 11 – 15: Granma y Cerro Pelado 2015 in Havana
  - Men's Freestyle: The United States won both the gold and overall medal tallies.
  - Women's Freestyle: The United States won both the gold and overall medal tallies.
  - Greco-Roman: Host nation, Cuba, won both the gold and overall medal tallies.
- February 12 & 13: Takhti Cup 2015 in Kermanshah
  - Men's Freestyle: Iran won both the gold and overall medal tallies.
  - Greco-Roman: Ukraine and Iran won both 3 gold medals each. Iran won the overall medal tally.
  - Pahlavani +90 kg winner: (Iran) Jaber Sadeghzadeh
- February 13 – 15: Klippan Lady Open 2015 in (Sweden) Klippan, Scania
  - Senior Women's Freestyle: China won both the gold and overall medal tallies.
  - Cadet Women's Freestyle: Japan won both the gold and overall medal tallies.
- February 27 & 28: Austrian Open 2015 in (Austria) Götzis
  - Junior Greco-Roman: Kazakhstan won both the gold and overall medal tallies.

=== March WRL ===
- March 5 – 7: Medved 2015 in Minsk
  - Men's Freestyle: Host nation, Belarus, and Russia won 2 gold medals each. Belarus won the overall medal tally.
  - Women's Freestyle: Host nation, Belarus, won the gold medal tally. Russia won the overall medal tally.
- March 6 – 8: Petko Sirakov and Ivan Iliev 2015 in Sofia
  - Junior Men's Freestyle: Georgia won the gold medal tally. Host nation, Bulgaria, won the overall medal tally.
  - Junior Women's Freestyle: Russia won the gold medal tally. Bulgaria won the overall medal tally.
  - Junior Greco-Roman: Turkey won both the gold and overall medal tallies.
- March 7 & 8: Roman Dmitriyev Memorial 2015 in Yakutsk
  - Junior Men's Freestyle: Russia won both the gold and overall medal tallies. (Note: Russia won all 8 gold medals in this event.)
- March 14: Thor Masters 2015 in Nykøbing Falster
  - Greco-Roman: Germany won the gold medal tally. Denmark and Germany won 4 overall medals each.
- March 14 & 15: Prix of the Buryatia Republic's President 2015 in Ulan-Ude
  - Men's Freestyle: Host nation, Russia, won the gold medal tally. Mongolia won the overall medal tally.
- March 27 – 29: Mongolia Open 2015 in Ulaanbaatar
  - Men's Freestyle: Host nation, Mongolia, won both the gold and overall medal tallies.
  - Women's Freestyle: Mongolia won both the gold and overall medal tallies.
- March 28 & 29: V. Freidenfelds Cup 2015 in (Latvia) Riga
  - Junior Men's Freestyle: Georgia won both the gold and overall medal tallies.
  - Junior Women's Freestyle: Belarus won both the gold and overall medal tallies.
  - Junior Greco-Roman: Georgia won both the gold and overall medal tallies.
- March 28 & 29: Yaşar Doğu 2015 in Istanbul
  - Men's Freestyle: Russia won the gold medal tally. Turkey and Russia won 8 overall medals each.

=== April WRL ===
- April 4 & 5: Vehbi Emre & Hamit Kaplan 2015 in Istanbul
  - Greco-Roman: Host nation, Turkey, won both the gold and overall medal tallies.
- April 11: Croatia Open 2015 in Zagreb
  - Cadet Greco-Roman: Hungary won both the gold and overall medal tallies.
- April 11 & 12: Abdelaziz Oueslati Memorial 2015 in Tunis
  - Men's Freestyle: Poland won the gold medal tally. Host nation, Tunisia, won the overall medal tally.
  - Greco-Roman: Egypt won the gold medal tally. Tunisia won the overall medal tally.
- April 16 – 19: Azerbaijan Wrestling Federation Cup 2015 in Baku
  - Junior Men's Freestyle: Azerbaijan won both the gold and overall medal tallies.
  - Junior Greco-Roman: Azerbaijan won the gold medal tally. Azerbaijan and Georgia won 9 overall medals each.
  - Cadet Men's Freestyle: Azerbaijan and Uzbekistan won 4 gold medals each. Azerbaijan won the overall medal tally.
  - Cadet Greco-Roman: Iran won the gold medal tally. Azerbaijan won the overall medal tally.
- April 24 – 26: Dan Kolov & Nikola Petrov 2015 in Sofia
  - Men's Freestyle: Bulgaria won both the gold and overall medal tallies.
  - Women's Freestyle: Sweden and Turkey won 2 gold medals each. Bulgaria, Turkey, and Ukraine won 5 overall medals each.
  - Greco-Roman: Bulgaria won both the gold and overall medal tallies.
- April 24 – 26: Adriatic Trophy 2015 in (Croatia) Poreč
  - Junior Greco-Roman: Bulgaria and Hungary won 2 gold medals each. Germany won the overall medal tally.

=== May WRL ===
- May 2 & 3: Mukhran Vakhtangadze 2015 in (Georgia (country)) Batumi
  - Junior Greco-Roman: Georgia won both the gold and overall medal tallies.
- May 9: Ljubomir Ivanović Gedza 2015 in (Serbia) Belgrade
  - Greco-Roman: Russia won both the gold and overall medal tallies.
- May 9: Macedonian Pearl 2015 in (North Macedonia) Radoviš
  - Men's Freestyle: Macedonia won both the gold and overall medal tallies.
- May 16 & 17: Olympia 2015 in Olympia
  - Men's Freestyle: Russia won the gold medal tally. Moldova won the overall medal tally.
  - Women's Freestyle: Canada and Mexico won 3 gold medals each. Canada won the overall medal tally.
  - Greco-Roman: Moldova won the gold medal tally. Greece won the overall medal tally.
- May 16 & 17: Jovenes Promesas 2015 in San Javier, Murcia
  - Junior Men's Freestyle: Canada won both the gold and overall medal tallies.
  - Junior Women's Freestyle: Canada and Italy won 3 gold medals each. Canada and Spain won 7 overall medals each.
  - Junior Greco-Roman: Austria and Spain won 2 gold medals each. Spain won the overall medal tally.
  - Cadet Men's Freestyle: Italy won the gold medal tally. Canada won the overall medal tally.
  - Cadet Women's Freestyle: Canada and Spain won 4 gold medals each. Spain won the overall medal tally.
  - Cadet Greco-Roman: Spain won both the gold and overall medal tallies.
- May 22 – 24: Mithat Bayrak & İsmet Atlı 2015 in Antalya
  - Junior Men's Freestyle: Turkey and Russia won 3 gold and 12 overall medals each.
  - Junior Women's Freestyle: Russia won both the gold and overall medal tallies.
  - Junior Greco-Roman: Turkey won both the gold and overall medal tallies.
- May 23 & 24: Nordic Championship 2015 in Bodø
  - Women's Freestyle: Norway won all the gold medals and have won the overall medal tally, too.
  - Greco-Roman: Sweden won both the gold and overall medal tallies.
  - Junior Greco-Roman: Sweden and Denmark won 2 gold medals each. Sweden and Finland won 5 overall medals each.
  - Cadet Women's Freestyle: Sweden won both the gold and overall medal tallies.
  - Cadet Greco-Roman: Norway and Sweden won 3 gold medals each. Finland won the overall medal tally.
- May 30: Milone Trophy Matteo Pellicone Memorial 2015 in Sassari
  - Greco-Roman: Mexico won the gold medal tally. Italy won the overall medal tally.
- May 30: Sassari City Matteo Pellicone Memorial 2015 in (Italy) Sassari
  - Men's Freestyle: India won both the gold and overall medal tallies.
  - Women's Freestyle: Kazakhstan won both the gold and overall medal tallies.
- May 30 & 31: Asashoryu Cup 2015 in Ulaanbaatar
  - Cadet Men's and Women's Freestyle: Mongolia won both the gold and overall medal tallies in these two categories.

=== June WRL ===
- June 4 – 6: Pat Shaw Memorial 2015 in Guatemala City
  - Junior Men's Freestyle: Guatemala won both the gold and overall medal tallies.
  - Junior Greco-Roman: HON won the gold medal tally. Guatemala won the overall medal tally.
  - Cadet Men's Freestyle: Guatemala won both the gold and overall medal tallies.
  - Cadet Greco-Roman: Guatemala won both the gold and overall medal tallies.
- June 6: Brandenburg Cup 2015 in Frankfurt / Oder
  - Junior Greco-Roman: Germany won both the gold and overall medal tallies.
- June 13: Canada Cup 2015 in Guelph
  - Men's Freestyle: Canada won both the gold and overall medal tallies.
  - Women's Freestyle: Canada won both the gold and overall medal tallies.

=== July WRL ===
- July 3 – 5: Ali Aliyev 2015 in Kaspiysk
  - Men's Freestyle: Russia won both the gold and overall medal tallies.
- July 4: Refik Memišević Brale 2015 in (Serbia) Subotica
  - Cadet Greco-Roman: Hungary and Turkey won 3 gold medals each. Hungary won the overall medal tally.
- July 18 & 19: Stepan Sargsyan Cup 2015 in Yerevan
  - Men's Freestyle: Armenia won the gold medal tally. Armenia and Russia won 9 overall medals each.
- July 18 & 19: Ion Cornianu & Ladislau Șimon 2015 in Bucharest
  - Men's Freestyle: Germany and Moldova won 3 gold medals each. Germany won the overall medal tally.
  - Women's Freestyle: Romania won both the gold and overall medal tallies.
  - Greco-Roman: Romania won the gold medal tally. Germany won the overall medal tally.
- July 24 – 26: Poland Open, Ziółkowski & Pytlasinski 2015 in Warsaw
  - Men's Freestyle: Iran won the gold medal tally. Turkey won the overall medal tally.
  - Women's Freestyle: Belarus and Mongolia won 2 gold medals each. Poland won the overall medal tally.
  - Greco-Roman: Russia won both the gold and overall medal tallies.
- July 24 – 26: Kazakhstan President Cup 2015 in Astana
  - Team Men's Freestyle Results
    - Gold: Kazakhstan Team #1; Silver: Mongolia; Bronze: Kazakhstan Team #2
  - Team Women's Freestyle Results
    - Gold: Kazakhstan Team #1; Silver: India; Bronze: Mongolia
  - Team Greco-Roman Results
    - Gold: Russia; Silver: Kazakhstan Team #1; Bronze: Uzbekistan

=== October WRL ===
- October 2 – 4: Dmitry Korkin 2015 in Yakutsk
  - Men's Freestyle: Russia won both the gold and overall medal tallies.
- October 9 – 11: Bolat Turlykhanov Memorial 2015 in Semey
  - Greco-Roman: Kazakhstan won both the gold and overall medal tallies.
- October 9 – 11: Ramzan Kadirov of Adlan Varaev 2015 in Grozny
  - Men's Freestyle: Russia won both the gold and overall medal tallies.
- October 16 – 18: Intercontinental Cup 2015 in Khasavyurt
  - Men's Freestyle: Russia won all the gold medals and won the overall medal tally, too.
- October 23 – 25: Republic Cup 2015 in Istanbul
  - Junior Men's Freestyle: Russia won the gold medal tally. Turkey won the overall medal tally.
  - Junior Greco-Roman: Hungary won the gold medal tally. Turkey won the overall medal tally.
- October 24: Kristjan Palusalu Memorial 2015 in (Estonia) Tallinn
  - Greco-Roman: Poland won both the gold and overall medal tallies.
- October 29 & 30: Martyrs Cup 2015 in Tehran
  - Junior Men's Freestyle
  - Winners: Russia
  - Second: Ukraine
  - Third: Iran
  - Junior Greco-Roman
  - Winners: Kyrgyzstan
  - Second: Georgia
  - Third: Iran

=== November WRL ===
- November 6 & 7: NYAC / Bill Farrell 2015 in New York City
  - Men's Freestyle: The United States won both the gold and overall medal tallies.
  - Women's Freestyle: Canada won both the gold and overall medal tallies.
  - Greco-Roman: The United States won both the gold and overall medal tallies.
- November 6 – 8: Open Cup of European Nations, Alrosa Cup 2015 in Moscow
  - Men's Freestyle: Russia won all the gold medals. Azerbaijan won all the silver medals. Georgia won all the bronze medals.
  - Women's Freestyle: Russia won all the gold medals. Ukraine won all the silver medals. Poland won all the bronze medals.
  - Greco-Roman: Russia won all the gold medals. Azerbaijan won all the silver medals. Belarus won all the bronze medals.
- November 19 & 20: Oleg Karavayev 2015 in Minsk
  - Greco-Roman: Russia won all the gold medals. Belarus won all the rest of the medals.
- November 21: Vantaa Cup 2015 in Finland
  - Greco-Roman: Russia won both the gold and overall medal tallies.
- November 21 & 22: Ibrahim Moustafa 2015 in Sharm el-Sheikh
  - Men's Freestyle: Egypt won all the gold medals and won the overall medal tally, too.
  - Greco-Roman: Egypt won both the gold and overall medal tallies.
- November 26 & 27: World Wrestling Clubs Cup 2015 #1 in (Iran) Mazandaran
  - Men's Freestyle: (Iran) Bimeh Razi Joubary
- November 27 & 28: 41st Henri Deglane Challenge 2015 in Nice
  - Men's Freestyle: Romania and the United States won 2 gold medals each. Romania and France won 5 overall medals each.
  - Women's Freestyle: Cuba won the gold medal tally. Romania won the overall medal tally.
- November 27 – 29: Kunayev D.A. 2015 in Taraz
  - Men's Freestyle: Russia won the gold medal tally. Kazakhstan won the overall medal tally.
- November 28: Arvo Haavisto 2015 in Ilmajoki
  - Greco-Roman: Poland won the gold medal tally. Finland won the overall medal tally.

=== December WRL ===
- December 5 & 6: Haparanda Cup 2015 in Sweden
  - Greco-Roman: Russia and Sweden won 4 gold medals each. Sweden won the overall medal tally.
- December 11 & 12: Brazil Cup 2015 in Rio de Janeiro
  - Women's Freestyle: Brazil won almost every medal here.
  - Greco-Roman: Brazil won almost every medal here.

=== World wrestling championships ===
- August 11 – 16: 2015 World Junior Wrestling Championships in (Brazil) Salvador, Bahia
  - Junior Men's Freestyle: Azerbaijan won the gold medal tally. Iran won the overall medal tally.
  - Junior Women's Freestyle: Japan won both the gold and overall medal tallies.
  - Junior Greco-Roman: Georgia won both the gold and overall medal tallies.
- August 25 – 30: 2015 World Cadet Wrestling Championships in (Bosnia and Herzegovina) Sarajevo
  - Cadet Men's Freestyle: Russia won both the gold and overall medal tallies.
  - Cadet Women's Freestyle: Japan won the gold medal tally. Japan and Russia won 8 overall medals each.
  - Cadet Greco-Roman: Iran won the gold medal tally. Russia won the overall medal tally.
- September 7 – 12: 2015 World Wrestling Championships in Las Vegas
  - Russia and the United States won 4 gold medals each. Russia won the overall medal tally.
- October 13 – 18: 2015 World Veterans Wrestling Championships in (Greece) Athens
  - Go to this event's UWW's web page to get detailed results.

=== Wrestling World Cups ===
- February 19 & 20: 2015 Greco-Roman World Cup in Tehran
  - Azerbaijan defeated Russia, 4–4 in matches played and by the score of 18–17 in classification points, for first place. Iran took third place.
- March 7 & 8: 2015 Women's Freestyle World Cup in Saint Petersburg
  - Japan defeated Russia, 5–3 in matches played, for first place. Mongolia took third place.
- April 11 & 12: 2015 Men's Freestyle World Cup in Los Angeles
  - Iran defeated the United States, 5–3 in matches played, for first place. Azerbaijan took third place.

=== Wrestling Grand Prix ===
- January 31 & February 1: 2015 Grand Prix of Paris in France
  - Men's Freestyle: Iran won the gold tally. Iran and Azerbaijan won 6 overall medals each.
  - Women's Freestyle: China won both the gold and overall medal tallies.
  - Greco-Roman: Lithuania won the gold medal tally. Azerbaijan and Poland won 5 overall medals each.
- February 21 & 22: 2015 Grand Prix Zagreb Open in Croatia
  - Greco-Roman: Belarus won both the gold and overall medal tallies.
- March 7 & 8: 2015 Hungarian Grand Prix in Szombathely
  - Greco-Roman: Hungary won both the gold and overall medal tallies.
- May 23 & 24: 2015 Grand Prix of Germany in Dormagen
  - Women's Freestyle: Russia and Sweden won 2 gold medals each. Russia won the overall medal tally.
  - Cadet Women's Freestyle: Russia won both the gold and overall medal tallies.
- July 11 & 12: 2015 Grand Prix of Spain in Madrid
  - Men's Freestyle: The United States won both the gold and overall medal tallies.
  - Women's Freestyle: China won both the gold and overall medal tallies.
  - Greco-Roman: Armenia won both the gold and overall medal tallies.
- November 27 – 29: 2015 Golden Grand Prix in Baku
  - Men's Freestyle: Azerbaijan won both the gold and overall medal tallies.
  - Women's Freestyle: China, Russia, and the United States won 2 gold medals each. China, Russia, and Japan won 4 overall medals each.
  - Greco-Roman: Azerbaijan won both the gold and overall medal tallies.

=== Continental wrestling championships ===
- March 20 – 22: 2015 Oceania Wrestling Championships in Majuro
  - Senior
  - Men's Freestyle: Australia and Palau won 3 gold medals each. The Marshall Islands won the overall medal tally.
  - Women's Freestyle: The Marshall Islands took 2 gold medals. New Zealand won one gold medal.
  - Greco-Roman: Australia won the gold medal tally. The Federated States of Micronesia won the overall medal tally.
  - Junior
  - Junior Men's Freestyle: Guam and Palau won 2 gold medals each. The Marshall Islands and the Federated States of Micronesia won 4 overall medals each.
  - Junior Women's Freestyle: The Marshall Islands' wrestler, Ilania Keju, was the only woman competitor here.
  - Junior Greco-Roman: American Samoa won the gold medal tally. The Marshall Islands, Palau, and the Federated States of Micronesia won 3 overall medals each.
  - Cadet
  - Cadet Men's Freestyle: The Marshall Islands won the gold medal tally. The Marshall Islands and the Federated States of Micronesia won 3 overall medals each.
  - Cadet Women's Freestyle: There were only two Guamanian women competitors here.
  - Cadet Greco-Roman: The Marshall Islands won the gold medal tally. The Marshall Islands and the Federated States of Micronesia won 3 overall medals each.
- March 24 – 29: 2015 European U23 Wrestling Championship in (Poland) Wałbrzych
  - Men's Freestyle: Russia won both the gold and overall medal tallies.
  - Women's Freestyle: Russia won both the gold and overall medal tallies.
  - Greco-Roman: Moldova and Russia won 2 gold medals each. Russia won the overall medal tally.
- April 18 & 19: 2015 Mediterranean Wrestling Championship in Madrid
  - Men's Freestyle: Greece and Spain won 4 gold medals each. Spain won the overall medal tally.
  - Women's Freestyle: Spain won both the gold and overall medal tallies.
  - Greco-Roman: Spain won both the gold and overall medal tallies.
  - Cadets Men's Freestyle: Spain won both the gold and overall medal tallies.
  - Cadets Women's Freestyle: Spain won both the gold and overall medal tallies.
  - Cadets Greco-Roman: France won the gold medal tally. Croatia won the overall medal tally.
- April 24 – 26: 2015 Pan American Wrestling Championships in (Chile) Santiago
  - Men's Freestyle: The United States won both the gold and overall medal tallies.
  - Women's Freestyle: Canada, Cuba, and the United States won 2 gold medals each. Canada won the overall medal tally.
  - Greco-Roman: Cuba won the gold medal tally. Cuba and the United States won 6 overall medals each.
- May 6 – 8: 2015 Pan American Junior Wrestling Championships in Havana
  - Junior Men's Freestyle: The United States won the gold medal tally. Cuba won the overall medal tally.
  - Junior Women's Freestyle: The United States won the gold medal tally. Cuba and the United States won 7 overall medals each.
  - Junior Greco-Roman: Cuba won both the gold and overall medal tallies.
- May 6 – 10: 2015 Asian Wrestling Championships in (Qatar) Doha
  - Men's Freestyle: Iran won the gold medal tally. Iran and Japan won 7 overall medals each.
  - Women's Freestyle: China and Japan won 4 gold medals each. Japan won the overall medal tally.
  - Greco-Roman: Iran won both the gold and overall medal tallies.
- May 27 – 31: 2015 African Wrestling Championships in Alexandria
  - Men's Freestyle: Egypt won the gold medal tally. Egypt and Algeria won 6 overall medals each.
  - Women's Freestyle: Egypt, Nigeria, and Tunisia won 2 gold medals each. Cameroon and Tunisia won 5 overall medals each.
  - Greco-Roman: Egypt won both the gold and overall medal tallies.
- June 11 – 14: 2015 Asian Cadet Wrestling Championships in New Delhi
  - Cadet Men's Freestyle: India won the gold medal tally. India and Iran won 7 overall medals each.
  - Cadet Women's Freestyle: Japan won both the gold and overall medal tallies.
  - Cadet Greco-Roman: Kazakhstan won the gold medal tally. Iran won the overall medal tally.
- June 23 – 28: 2015 European Junior Wrestling Championships in (Turkey) Istanbul
  - Junior Men's Freestyle: Russia won both the gold and overall medal tallies.
  - Junior Women's Freestyle: Russia won the gold medal tally. Azerbaijan won the overall medal tally.
  - Junior Greco-Roman: Azerbaijan won the gold medal tally. Georgia won the overall medal tally.
- July 3 – 5: 2015 Pan American Cadet Wrestling Championships in Guadalajara
  - Cadet Men's Freestyle: The United States won both the gold and overall medal tallies.
  - Cadet Women's Freestyle: Mexico won both the gold and overall medal tallies.
  - Cadet Greco-Roman: The United States won the gold medal tally. Mexico and the United States won 10 overall medals each.
- July 9 – 12: 2015 Asian Junior Wrestling Championships in (Myanmar) Naypyidaw
  - Junior Men's Freestyle: Iran won the gold medal tally. India won the overall medal tally.
  - Junior Women's Freestyle: Japan won both the gold and overall medal tallies.
  - Junior Greco-Roman: India, Iran, and Kazakhstan won 2 gold medals each. Kazakhstan won the overall medal tally.
- August 4 – 9: 2015 European Cadet Wrestling Championships in (Serbia) Subotica
  - Cadet Men's Freestyle: Georgia and Russia won 3 gold medals each. Georgia won the overall medal tally.
  - Cadet Women's Freestyle: Germany won the gold medal tally. Russia won the overall medal tally.
  - Cadet Greco-Roman: Russia won both the gold and overall medal tallies.
- October 4 & 5: 2015 Arab Junior Wrestling Championships in El Jadida
  - Junior Men's Freestyle: Jordan and Morocco won 3 gold medals each. Morocco won the overall medal tally.
  - Junior Greco-Roman: Jordan and Morocco won 3 gold medals each. Morocco and Saudi Arabia won 7 overall medals each.
- October 7 & 8: 2015 Arab Senior Wrestling Championships in El Jadida
  - Men's Freestyle: Morocco won both the gold and overall medal tallies.
  - Greco-Roman: Morocco won both the gold and overall medal tallies.
- October 23 – 25: Balkan Championships 2015 in Bursa (debut event)
  - Cadet Men's Freestyle: Turkey won both the gold and overall medal tallies.
  - Cadet Women's Freestyle: Turkey and Romania won 4 gold medals each. Turkey won the overall medal tally.
  - Cadet Greco-Roman: Turkey won both the gold and overall medal tallies.
- November 13 – 15: 2015 South American Championship in Buenos Aires
  - Men's Freestyle: Argentina won both the gold and overall medal tallies.
  - Women's Freestyle: Brazil won the gold medal tally. Argentina won the overall medal tally.
  - Greco-Roman: Brazil won both the gold and overall medal tallies.
