= Sarah Adlington =

British judoka (born 1986)

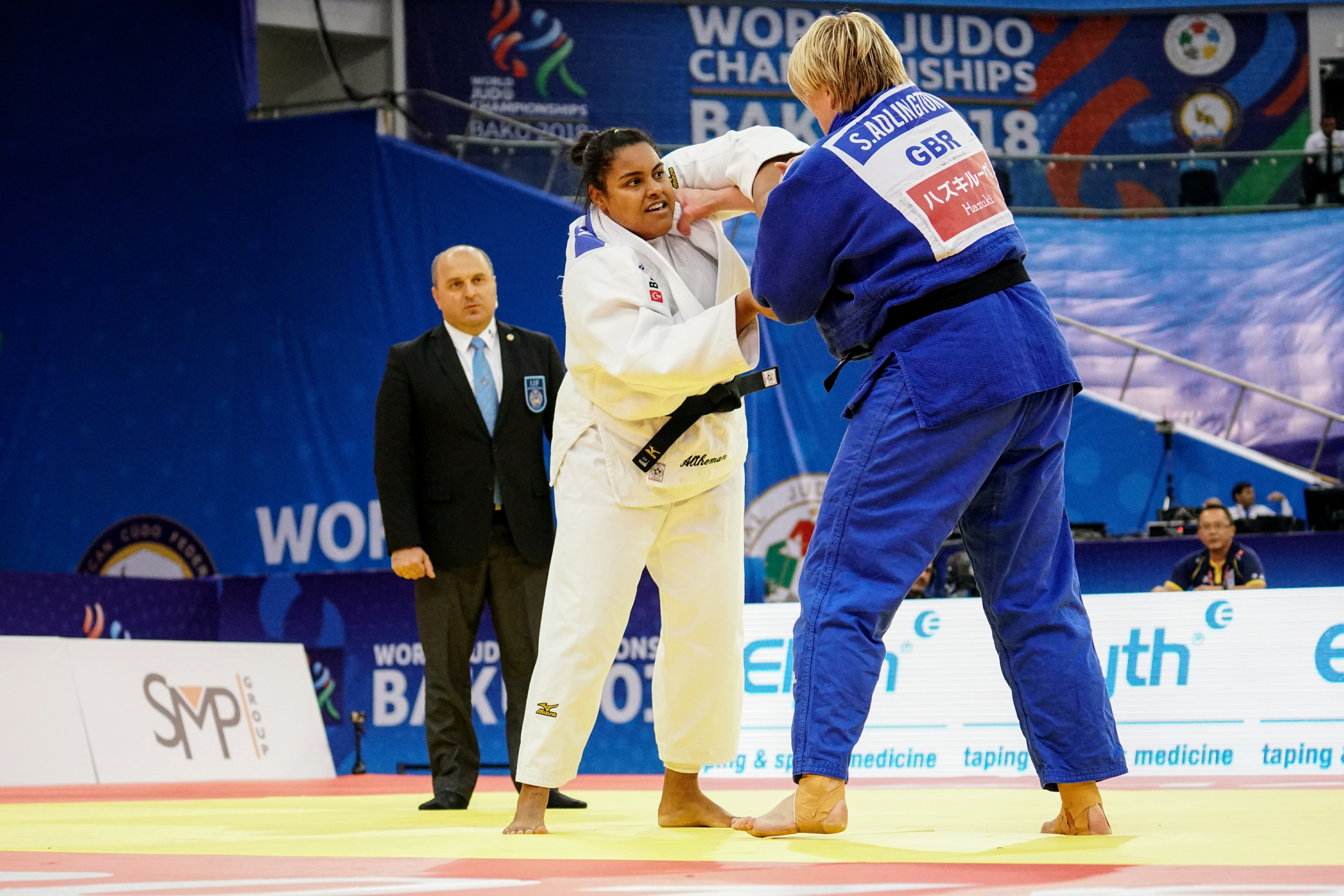
- Adlington (right) faces off against Maria Suelen Altheman at the 2018 World Judo Championships

Personal information
- Nationality: British (Scottish)
- Born: 5 August 1986 (age 39) Shrewsbury, Shropshire, England
- Occupation: Judoka

Sport
- Country: Great Britain
- Sport: Judo
- Weight class: +78 kg

Achievements and titles
- Olympic Games: R32 (2020)
- World Champ.: 5th (2018)
- European Champ.: 7th (2019)
- Commonwealth Games: (gold) (2014, 2022)
Medal record
Women's judo
Representing Great Britain
IJF Grand Slam
Bronze medal – third place	2013 Moscow	+78 kg
IJF Grand Prix
Bronze medal – third place	2014 Tashkent	+78 kg
Bronze medal – third place	2017 Cancún	+78 kg
Bronze medal – third place	2017 Tashkent	+78 kg
Bronze medal – third place	2017 The Hague	+78 kg
Bronze medal – third place	2019 Tashkent	+78 kg
European U23 Championships
Bronze medal – third place	2007 Salzburg	+78 kg
Bronze medal – third place	2008 Zagreb	+78 kg
European Junior Championships
Silver medal – second place	2005 Zagreb	+78 kg
Representing Scotland
Commonwealth Games
Gold medal – first place	2014 Scotland	+78 kg
Gold medal – first place	2022 Birmingham	+78 kg

Profile at external databases
- IJF: 1923
- JudoInside.com: 25511
- Updated on 27 November 2022

Sarah Jayne Adlington (born 5 August 1986) is a British judoka, who won gold at the 2014 Commonwealth Games and 2022 Commonwealth Games.

== Judo career ==
Adlington has won over 75 medals including becoming champion of Great Britain on eight occasions, winning the heavyweight division at the British Judo Championships in 2007, 2008, 2012, 2013, 2014, 2021, 2023 and 2024.

In 2013, she won the European Open in Rome and in 2015, she won the +78 kg gold at the 2015 Oceania Open in Wollongong.

She competed in the 2019 European Games in Minsk, Belarus. In 2020, she was selected to represent Great Britain at the 2020 Summer Olympics in Tokyo but was defeated in the first round of the women's +78 kg category.

She competed for Scotland at the Commonwealth Games in 2014 where she won a gold medal in the Women's +78 kg event and in 2022 where she won another gold medal in the Women's +78 kg event.

In 2023, she won the +78 kg title at the British Judo Championships. This was her seventh British national title.

== Personal life ==
Born in Shrewsbury, England, Adlington was raised in Edinburgh.

== Achievements ==
Year	Tournament	Place	Weight class
2008	European Championships	5th	Heavyweight (+78 kg)
2009	European Championships	7th	Heavyweight (+78 kg)
