= Lucassen =

Lucassen is a Dutch surname. Notable people with the surname include:

- Arjen Anthony Lucassen (born 1960), Dutch singer, songwriter, multi-instrumentalist musician, and record producer
- Eric Lucassen (born 1974), Dutch politician and digital music educator
- Ilona Lucassen (1997–2020), Dutch judoka
- Rüdiger Lucassen (born 1951), German politician
- Sjaak Lucassen (born 1961), Dutch long-distance motorcycle rider
