= Carolin Weiß =

German judoka (born 1993)

Personal information
- Born: 13 April 1993 (age 33)
- Occupation: Judoka

Sport
- Country: Germany
- Sport: Judo
- Weight class: +78 kg

Achievements and titles
- World Champ.: R16 (2018)
- European Champ.: (bronze) (2017)
Medal record
Women's judo
Representing Germany
European Championships
Gold medal – first place	2018 Yekaterinburg	Mixed team
Bronze medal – third place	2016 Kazan	Women's team
Bronze medal – third place	2017 Warsaw	+78 kg
IJF Grand Slam
Silver medal – second place	2016 Abu Dhabi	+78 kg
Bronze medal – third place	2013 Baku	+78 kg
Bronze medal – third place	2017 Ekaterinburg	+78 kg
Bronze medal – third place	2018 Ekaterinburg	+78 kg
Bronze medal – third place	2018 Abu Dhabi	+78 kg
IJF Grand Prix
Gold medal – first place	2016 Budapest	+78 kg
Silver medal – second place	2013 Samsun	+78 kg
Silver medal – second place	2015 Ulaanbaatar	+78 kg
Silver medal – second place	2016 Zagreb	+78 kg
Silver medal – second place	2018 Tashkent	+78 kg
Bronze medal – third place	2015 Düsseldorf	+78 kg
European U23 Championships
Gold medal – first place	2015 Bratislava	+78 kg
Silver medal – second place	2012 Prague	+78 kg
World Juniors Championships
Silver medal – second place	2011 Cape Town	+78 kg
Silver medal – second place	2013 Ljubljana	+78 kg
European Junior Championships
Gold medal – first place	2011 Lommel	+78 kg
Bronze medal – third place	2012 Poreč	+78 kg
World Cadets Championships
Bronze medal – third place	2009 Budapest	+70 kg

Profile at external databases
- IJF: 9134
- JudoInside.com: 47774
- Updated on 11 November 2022

Carolin Weiß (born 13 April 1993) is a German judoka. She is a 2017 European bronze medalist in the +78 kg division.
