= Sakagami =

Sakagami (written: 坂上) is a Japanese surname. Notable people with the surname include:

- Aya Sakagami (坂上 綾; born 1997), Japanese judoka
- Hiroshi Sakagami (坂上 弘; 1936–2021), Japanese writer
- Jirō Sakagami (坂上 二郎; 1934–2011), Japanese comedian, actor, singer
- Kaori Sakagami (坂上 香織; born 1974), Japanese former singer and actress
- Kaori Sakagami (athlete) (坂上 香織; born 1974), Japanese retired sprinter
- Katsuki Sakagami (坂上 嘉津季; born 1992), Japanese freestyle wrestler
- Shinobu Sakagami (坂上 忍; born 1967), Japanese tarento, essayist, television presenter
- Tomoko Sakagami (坂上 智子; born 1983), Japanese ice hockey player
- Yasutarō Sakagami (阪上 安太郎; 1912–1984), Japanese water polo player

== Fictional characters ==
- Semimaru Sakagami (坂上 蝉丸), protagonist of the visual novel Tasogare
- Shuichi Sakagami (坂上 修一), protagonist of the visual novel Gakkou de atta Kowai Hanashi
- Tomoyo Sakagami (坂上 智代), a character in the visual novel Clannad
