= Masako Doi =

Japanese judoka (born 1995)

Personal information
- Nationality: Japanese
- Born: 9 June 1995 (age 31)
- Occupation: Judoka

Sport
- Country: Japan
- Sport: Judo
- Weight class: –63 kg
Medal record
Women's judo
Representing Japan
World Masters
Bronze medal – third place	2019 Qingdao	–63 kg
IJF Grand Slam
Gold medal – first place	2018 Osaka	–63 kg
Gold medal – first place	2019 Osaka	–63 kg
Silver medal – second place	2022 Paris	–63 kg
Bronze medal – third place	2019 Düsseldorf	–63 kg
Bronze medal – third place	2020 Paris	–63 kg
IJF Grand Prix
Gold medal – first place	2019 Budapest	–63 kg
Bronze medal – third place	2018 The Hague	–63 kg
Asian Junior Championships
Gold medal – first place	2015 Bangkok	–63 kg

Profile at external databases
- IJF: 28321
- JudoInside.com: 100686
- Updated on 20 November 2022

Masako Doi (born 9 June 1995) is a Japanese judoka. She is the gold medallist of the 2018 Judo Grand Slam Osaka in the 60 kg category. She won the silver medal in her event at the 2022 Judo Grand Slam Paris held in Paris, France.
