= Sarah Asahina =

Japanese judoka (born 1996)

Personal information
- Nationality: Japanese
- Born: 22 October 1996 (age 29) Tokyo, Japan
- Occupation: Judoka

Sport
- Country: Japan
- Sport: Judo
- Weight class: +78 kg

Achievements and titles
- World Champ.: (2017, 2018, 2021)
Medal record
Women's judo
Representing Japan
World Championships
Gold medal – first place	2017 Budapest	Mixed team
Gold medal – first place	2017 Marrakesh	Open
Gold medal – first place	2018 Baku	+78 kg
Gold medal – first place	2018 Baku	Mixed team
Gold medal – first place	2021 Budapest	+78 kg
Silver medal – second place	2017 Budapest	+78 kg
Bronze medal – third place	2019 Tokyo	+78 kg
IJF Grand Slam
Gold medal – first place	2016 Tokyo	+78 kg
Gold medal – first place	2017 Paris	+78 kg
Gold medal – first place	2017 Ekaterinburg	+78 kg
Gold medal – first place	2017 Tokyo	+78 kg
Gold medal – first place	2018 Düsseldorf	+78 kg
Gold medal – first place	2020 Düsseldorf	+78 kg
Silver medal – second place	2014 Tokyo	+78 kg
Silver medal – second place	2019 Düsseldorf	+78 kg
Bronze medal – third place	2012 Tokyo	+78 kg
Bronze medal – third place	2018 Osaka	+78 kg
Bronze medal – third place	2019 Osaka	+78 kg
IJF Grand Prix
Gold medal – first place	2015 Jeju	+78 kg
Gold medal – first place	2019 Montreal	+78 kg
Bronze medal – third place	2018 Zagreb	+78 kg
World Juniors Championships
Gold medal – first place	2014 Fort Lauderdale	+78 kg
World Cadets Championships
Gold medal – first place	2011 Kyiv	+70 kg
Summer Universiade
Gold medal – first place	2015 Gwangju	+78 kg

Profile at external databases
- IJF: 7351
- JudoInside.com: 76648
- Updated on 23 May 2023

Sarah Asahina (朝比奈 沙羅, Asahina Sara; born 22 October 1996) is a Japanese judoka.

She won a silver medal at the 2017 World Judo Championships in Budapest.
