= 2018 Judo Grand Prix The Hague =

Judo competition

Judo 2018 Judo Grand Prix The Hague
- Venue: Sportcampus Zuiderpark
- Location: The Hague, Netherlands
- Dates: 16–18 November 2018
- Competitors: 410 from 61 nations

Competition at external databases
- Links: IJF • EJU • JudoInside

The 2018 Judo Grand Prix The Hague was held at the Sportcampus Zuiderpark in The Hague, Netherlands, from 16 to 18 November 2018.

== Medal summary ==
=== Men's events ===
Event	Gold	Silver	Bronze
Extra-lightweight (−60 kg)	Dashdavaagiin Amartüvshin (MGL)	Dai Aoki (JPN)	Ganbatyn Boldbaatar (MGL)
Extra-lightweight (−60 kg)	Dashdavaagiin Amartüvshin (MGL)	Dai Aoki (JPN)	Romaric Bouda (FRA)
Half-lightweight (−66 kg)	Vazha Margvelashvili (GEO)	Baruch Shmailov (ISR)	Sebastian Seidl (GER)
Half-lightweight (−66 kg)	Vazha Margvelashvili (GEO)	Baruch Shmailov (ISR)	Kiyotaka Kido (JPN)
Lightweight (−73 kg)	Musa Mogushkov (RUS)	Akil Gjakova (KOS)	Lasha Shavdatuashvili (GEO)
Lightweight (−73 kg)	Musa Mogushkov (RUS)	Akil Gjakova (KOS)	Victor Sterpu (MDA)
Half-middleweight (−81 kg)	Ivaylo Ivanov (BUL)	Frank de Wit (NED)	Dominic Ressel (GER)
Half-middleweight (−81 kg)	Ivaylo Ivanov (BUL)	Frank de Wit (NED)	Antonio Esposito (ITA)
Middleweight (−90 kg)	Aleksandar Kukolj (SRB)	Nikoloz Sherazadishvili (ESP)	Peter Žilka (SVK)
Middleweight (−90 kg)	Aleksandar Kukolj (SRB)	Nikoloz Sherazadishvili (ESP)	Jesper Smink (NED)
Half-heavyweight (−100 kg)	Peter Paltchik (ISR)	Mikita Sviryd (BLR)	Michael Korrel (NED)
Half-heavyweight (−100 kg)	Peter Paltchik (ISR)	Mikita Sviryd (BLR)	Leonardo Gonçalves (BRA)
Heavyweight (+100 kg)	Iakiv Khammo (UKR)	Vlăduț Simionescu (ROU)	Maciej Sarnacki (POL)
Heavyweight (+100 kg)	Iakiv Khammo (UKR)	Vlăduț Simionescu (ROU)	Roy Meyer (NED)

=== Women's events ===
Event	Gold	Silver	Bronze
Extra-lightweight (−48 kg)	Maryna Cherniak (UKR)	Xiong Yao (CHN)	Distria Krasniqi (KOS)
Extra-lightweight (−48 kg)	Maryna Cherniak (UKR)	Xiong Yao (CHN)	Aya Sakagami (JPN)
Half-lightweight (−52 kg)	Charline Van Snick (BEL)	Eleudis Valentim (BRA)	Réka Pupp (HUN)
Half-lightweight (−52 kg)	Charline Van Snick (BEL)	Eleudis Valentim (BRA)	Astride Gneto (FRA)
Lightweight (−57 kg)	Terumi Otsuji (JPN)	Lu Tongjuan (CHN)	Miryam Roper (PAN)
Lightweight (−57 kg)	Terumi Otsuji (JPN)	Lu Tongjuan (CHN)	Priscilla Gneto (FRA)
Half-middleweight (−63 kg)	Yang Junxia (CHN)	Alice Schlesinger (GBR)	Amy Livesey (GBR)
Half-middleweight (−63 kg)	Yang Junxia (CHN)	Alice Schlesinger (GBR)	Masako Doi (JPN)
Middleweight (−70 kg)	Sally Conway (GBR)	Sanne van Dijke (NED)	Miriam Butkereit (GER)
Middleweight (−70 kg)	Sally Conway (GBR)	Sanne van Dijke (NED)	Gabriella Willems (BEL)
Half-heavyweight (−78 kg)	Antonina Shmeleva (RUS)	Sama Hawa Camara (FRA)	Samanta Soares (BRA)
Half-heavyweight (−78 kg)	Antonina Shmeleva (RUS)	Sama Hawa Camara (FRA)	Ilona Lucassen (NED)
Heavyweight (+78 kg)	Maryna Slutskaya (BLR)	Hortence Vanessa Mballa Atangana (CMR)	Larisa Cerić (BIH)
Heavyweight (+78 kg)	Maryna Slutskaya (BLR)	Hortence Vanessa Mballa Atangana (CMR)	Anne Fatoumata M'Bairo (FRA)

Source Results

=== Medal table ===
* Host nation (Netherlands)

Rank	Nation	Gold	Silver	Bronze	Total
1	Russia (RUS)	2	0	0	2
1	Ukraine (UKR)	2	0	0	2
3	China (CHN)	1	2	0	3
4	Japan (JPN)	1	1	3	5
5	Great Britain (GBR)	1	1	1	3
6	Belarus (BLR)	1	1	0	2
6	Israel (ISR)	1	1	0	2
8	Belgium (BEL)	1	0	1	2
8	Georgia (GEO)	1	0	1	2
8	Mongolia (MGL)	1	0	1	2
11	Bulgaria (BUL)	1	0	0	1
11	Serbia (SRB)	1	0	0	1
13	Netherlands (NED)*	0	2	4	6
14	France (FRA)	0	1	4	5
15	Brazil (BRA)	0	1	2	3
16	Kosovo (KOS)	0	1	1	2
17	Cameroon (CMR)	0	1	0	1
17	Romania (ROU)	0	1	0	1
17	Spain (ESP)	0	1	0	1
20	Germany (GER)	0	0	3	3
21	Bosnia and Herzegovina (BIH)	0	0	1	1
21	Hungary (HUN)	0	0	1	1
21	Italy (ITA)	0	0	1	1
21	Moldova (MDA)	0	0	1	1
21	Panama (PAN)	0	0	1	1
21	Poland (POL)	0	0	1	1
21	Slovakia (SVK)	0	0	1	1
Totals (27 entries)		14	14	28	56
