= Han Mi-jin =

South Korean judoka (born 1995)

Personal information
- Born: 2 August 1995 (age 30)
- Occupation: Judoka
- Height: 1.75 m (5 ft 9 in)
- Weight: 80 kg

Sport
- Country: South Korea
- Sport: Judo
- Weight class: +78 kg

Achievements and titles
- Olympic Games: 7th (2020)
- World Champ.: R16 (2018)
- Asian Champ.: (silver) (2019)
Medal record
Women's judo
Representing South Korea
World Championships
| Bronze medal – third place | 2018 Baku | Mixed team |
Asian Championships
| Silver medal – second place | 2019 Fujairah | +78 kg |
| Bronze medal – third place | 2021 Bishkek | +78 kg |
IJF Grand Slam
| Gold medal – first place | 2019 Abu Dhabi | +78 kg |
IJF Grand Prix
| Gold medal – first place | 2017 Hohhot | +78 kg |
World Juniors Championships
| Bronze medal – third place | 2015 Abu Dhabi | +78 kg |
Asian Junior Championships
| Bronze medal – third place | 2013 Hainan | +78 kg |
Summer Universiade
| Gold medal – first place | 2017 Taipei | +78 kg |
| Gold medal – first place | 2019 Naples | +70 kg |
| Silver medal – second place | 2019 Naples | Open |

Profile at external databases
- IJF: 8136
- JudoInside.com: 79741
- Updated on 21 November 2022

Han Mi-jin (born 2 August 1995) is a South Korean judoka.

Han participated at the 2018 World Judo Championships, winning a medal in the Mixed team event.
