= Rochele Nunes =

Brazilian judoka (born 1989)

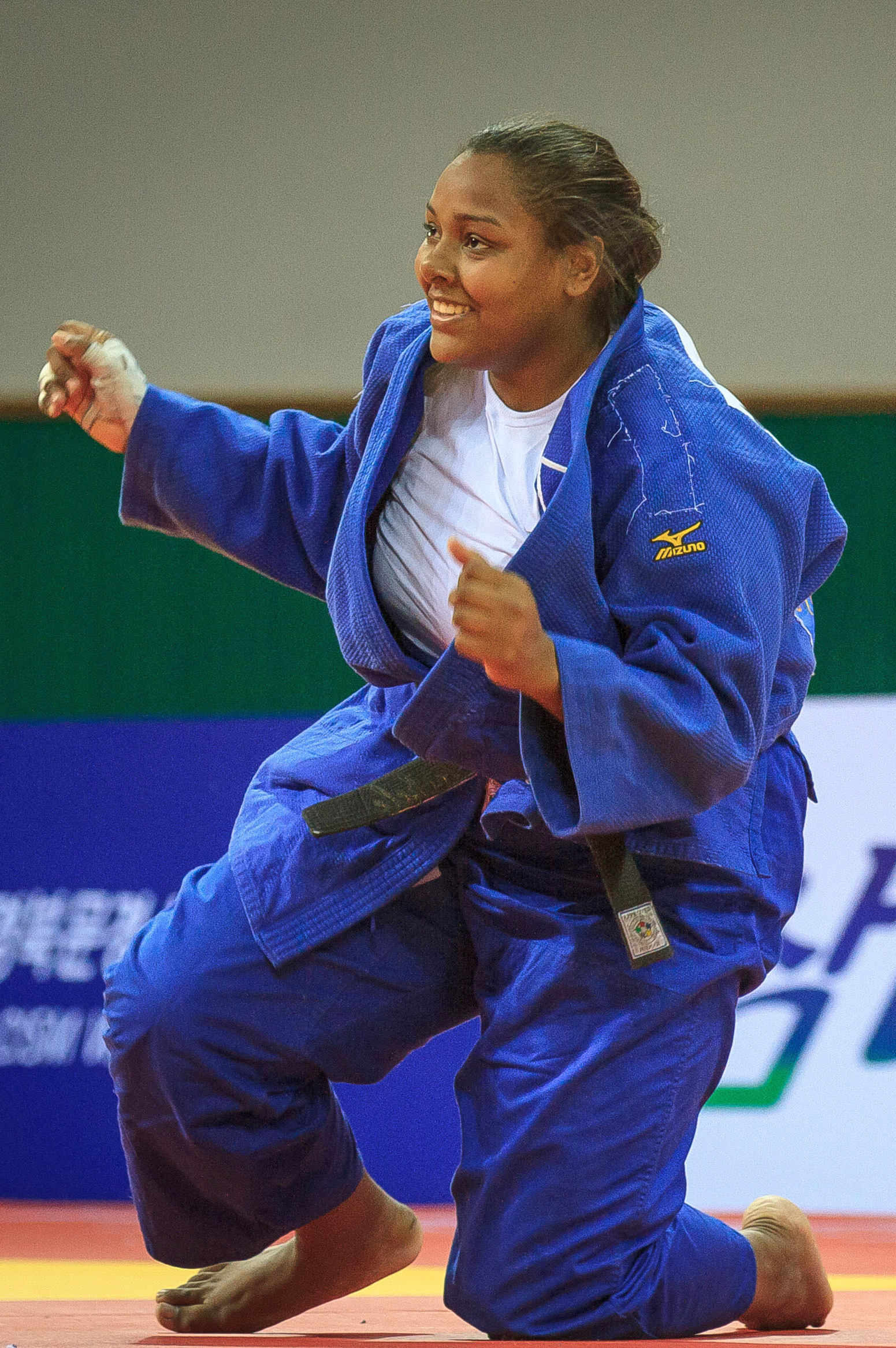
- Nunes at the 2015 Military World Games

Personal information
- Full name: Rochele Jesus Nunes
- Nationality: Portuguese
- Born: 19 June 1989 (age 37) Pelotas, Brazil
- Occupation: Judoka
- Height: 169 cm (5 ft 7 in)
- Weight: 105 kg (231 lb)

Sport
- Country: Brazil (until 2018); Portugal (since 2019)
- Sport: Judo
- Weight class: +78 kg
- Club: Benfica

Achievements and titles
- Olympic Games: R16 (2020, 2024)
- World Champ.: R16 (2022)
- Regional finals: (silver) (2015); (bronze) (2020, 2021)
Medal record
Women's judo
Representing Brazil
Pan American Championships
Silver medal – second place	2015 Edmonton	+78 kg
Bronze medal – third place	2013 San José	+78 kg
Bronze medal – third place	2014 Guayaquil	+78 kg
Bronze medal – third place	2016 Havana	+78 kg
IJF Grand Slam
Bronze medal – third place	2011 Rio de Janeiro	+78 kg
Bronze medal – third place	2012 Rio de Janeiro	+78 kg
IJF Grand Prix
Bronze medal – third place	2014 Zagreb	+78 kg
World Juniors Championships
Bronze medal – third place	2006 Santo Domingo	+78 kg
Summer Universiade
Gold medal – first place	2013 Kazan	+78 kg
Silver medal – second place	2013 Kazan	Open
Military World Games
Gold medal – first place	2015 Mungyeong	Women's team
Bronze medal – third place	2015 Mungyeong	+78 kg
Representing Portugal
European Games
Silver medal – second place	2019 Minsk	Mixed team
European Championships
Bronze medal – third place	2020 Prague	+78 kg
Bronze medal – third place	2021 Lisbon	+78 kg
IJF Grand Slam
Gold medal – first place	2023 Abu Dhabi	+78 kg
Silver medal – second place	2021 Tel Aviv	+78 kg
Silver medal – second place	2021 Tbilisi	+78 kg
Silver medal – second place	2022 Baku	+78 kg
Silver medal – second place	2023 Baku	+78 kg
Bronze medal – third place	2019 Ekaterinburg	+78 kg
Bronze medal – third place	2019 Brasilia	+78 kg
Bronze medal – third place	2020 Paris	+78 kg
Bronze medal – third place	2022 Abu Dhabi	+78 kg
IJF Grand Prix
Gold medal – first place	2023 Dushanbe	+78 kg
Silver medal – second place	2019 Perth	+78 kg
Silver medal – second place	2023 Almada	+78 kg
Bronze medal – third place	2019 Tel Aviv	+78 kg
Bronze medal – third place	2019 Tbilisi	+78 kg
Bronze medal – third place	2020 Tel Aviv	+78 kg
Bronze medal – third place	2026 Zagreb	+78 kg

Profile at external databases
- IJF: 49641, 441
- JudoInside.com: 43349
- Updated on 15 November 2026

Rochele Jesus Nunes (born 19 June 1989) is a heavyweight judoka from Brazil who represents Portugal. She won one silver and three bronze medals at the Pan American Judo Championships from 2013 to 2016.
