= 2016 European Judo Championships – Women's team =

Judo competition

Judo Women's team at the 2016 European Judo Championships
- Venue: TatNeft Arena
- Location: Kazan, Russia
- Date: 24 April

Medalists
gold medal	Poland (1st title)
silver medal	Russia
bronze medal	Germany
bronze medal	France

Competition at external databases
- Links: JudoInside

The women's team competition at the 2016 European Judo Championships was held on 24 April at the TatNeft Arena in Kazan, Russia.

== Results ==
Quarterfinals
Russia	5
Ukraine	0
Germany	3
Croatia	2
Hungary	2
Poland	3

Semifinals
France	2
Russia	3
Germany	2
Poland	3

Final
Russia	2
Poland	3

=== Repechage ===
Repechage

Third place
Ukraine	0
Germany	5

Repechage
Croatia	3
Hungary	2

Third place
Croatia	1
France	4
