= Kime-no-kata =

Judo form/technique

Kime no kata
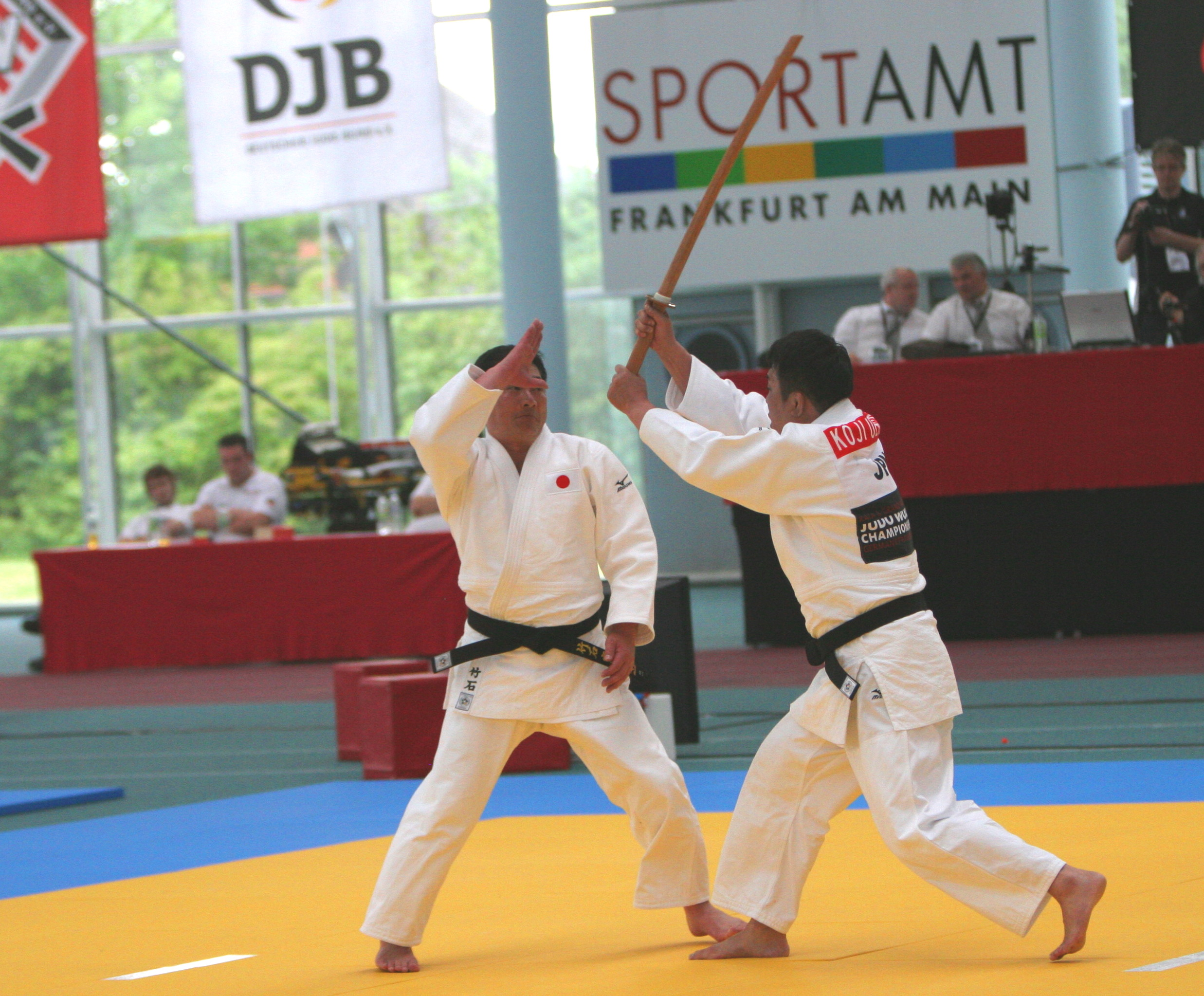
- Classification: Kata
- Sub classification: Kodokan kata
- Kodokan: Yes

Technique name
- Rōmaji: Kime-no-kata
- Japanese: 極の形
- English: Forms of decisiveness

Kime no kata (極の形) is a series of self-defense oriented katas in judo. Kime no kata, also known as Shinken Shobu no Kata (真剣勝負の形; "the kata of real fighting"), was developed at the Kodokan around 1888. The series is composed of 8 techniques from a kneeling posture (idori waza), and 12 techniques from a standing position (tachi waza). Both sets of techniques contain defenses for both armed and empty-handed attacks.

== Kneeling techniques (idori waza) ==
1. Ryote-dori (両手取)
2. Tsukkake (突掛)
3. Suri-age (摺上)
4. Yoko-uchi (横打)
5. Ushiro-dori (後取)
6. Tsukkomi (突込)
7. Kiri-komi (切込)
8. Yoko-tsuki (横突)

== Standing techniques (tachi waza) ==
1. Ryote-dori (両手取)
2. Sode-tori (袖取)
3. Tsukkake (突掛)
4. Tsuki-age (突上)
5. Suri-age (摺上)
6. Yoko-uchi (横打)
7. Ke-age (蹴上)
8. Ushiro-dori (後取)
9. Tsuki-komi (突込)
10. Kiri-komi (切込)
11. Nuki-kake (抜掛)
12. Kiri-oroshi (切下)
