= TJ Curry =

American taekwondo practitioner

TJ Curry (born August 10, 1987) is the current US National Team Welterweight and 2013 US National Welterweight Champion, 2010 US National Champion, and 2011 Pan American Games US Team member in taekwondo. Curry was the 2012 USA Olympic Team Alternate to Steven Lopez in the 80 kg division. Curry was selected as the US Welterweight fighter for the 2013 SportAccord World Combat Games Team. Curry is the World Taekwondo Center's Team Captain and is coached by Brian Singer in Oakland, California.
