= Galyna Tarasova =

Ukrainian judoka (born 1993)

Personal information
- Born: 23 September 1993 (age 32)
- Occupation: Judoka

Sport
- Country: Ukraine
- Sport: Judo
- Weight class: +78 kg

Achievements and titles
- World Champ.: R16 (2017, 2018, 2019)
- European Champ.: 5th (2018, 2019)
Medal record
Women's judo
Representing Ukraine
IJF Grand Prix
Bronze medal – third place	2018 Tunis	+78 kg
Bronze medal – third place	2018 Antalya	+78 kg
European U23 Championships
Bronze medal – third place	2013 Samokov	+78 kg

Profile at external databases
- IJF: 9705
- JudoInside.com: 55379
- Updated on 18 November 2021

Galyna Tarasova (born 23 September 1993) is a Ukrainian judoka.

Tarasova is a bronze medalist from the 2018 Judo Grand Prix Tunis in the +78 kg category.
