= Maryna Slutskaya =

Belarusian judoka (born 1991)

Personal information
- Nickname: Marusya
- Born: 9 July 1991 (age 34)
- Occupation: Judoka

Sport
- Country: Belarus
- Sport: Judo
- Weight class: +78 kg

Achievements and titles
- Olympic Games: R16 (2020)
- World Champ.: R16 (2013, 2018, 2019, 2021)
- European Champ.: (gold) (2017, 2019)
Medal record
Women's judo
Representing Belarus
European Games
Gold medal – first place	2019 Minsk	+78 kg
European Championships
Gold medal – first place	2017 Warsaw	+78 kg
Bronze medal – third place	2021 Lisbon	+78 kg
World Masters
Bronze medal – third place	2019 Qingdao	+78 kg
IJF Grand Slam
Gold medal – first place	2018 Abu Dhabi	+78 kg
Silver medal – second place	2020 Paris	+78 kg
Silver medal – second place	2021 Kazan	+78 kg
Bronze medal – third place	2016 Abu Dhabi	+78 kg
Bronze medal – third place	2017 Ekaterinburg	+78 kg
Bronze medal – third place	2021 Tel Aviv	+78 kg
IJF Grand Prix
Gold medal – first place	2017 Tbilisi	+78 kg
Gold medal – first place	2018 Tunis	+78 kg
Gold medal – first place	2018 The Hague	+78 kg
Silver medal – second place	2013 Almaty	+78 kg
Silver medal – second place	2016 Tashkent	+78 kg
Silver medal – second place	2018 Tbilisi	+78 kg
Silver medal – second place	2018 Budapest	+78 kg
Bronze medal – third place	2016 Tbilisi	+78 kg
Bronze medal – third place	2018 Tashkent	+78 kg
Bronze medal – third place	2019 Tbilisi	+78 kg
European U23 Championships
Bronze medal – third place	2010 Sarajevo	+78 kg
Bronze medal – third place	2011 Tyumen	+78 kg
European Junior Championships
Silver medal – second place	2008 Warsaw	+78 kg
Silver medal – second place	2010 Samokov	+78 kg
Summer Universiade
Bronze medal – third place	2013 Kazan	+78 kg

Profile at external databases
- IJF: 3924
- JudoInside.com: 47260
- Updated on 10 November 2022

Maryna Uladzimirauna Slutskaya (Belarusian: Марына Уладзіміраўна Слуцкая; born 9 July 1991) is a Belarusian judoka. She is the 2017 European gold medalist in the +78 kg division.

In 2021, Slutskaya competed in the women's +78 kg event at the 2021 Judo World Masters held in Doha, Qatar. In June 2021, she competed in the women's +78 kg event at the 2021 World Judo Championships held in Budapest, Hungary. She competed in the women's +78 kg event at the 2020 Summer Olympics in Tokyo, Japan.
