= Ilona Lucassen =

Dutch judoka (born 1997)

Personal information
- Born: 24 May 1997 Geldrop, Netherlands
- Died: 12 June 2020 (aged 23) Arnhem, Netherlands
- Occupation: Judoka

Sport
- Country: Netherlands
- Sport: Judo
- Weight class: ‍–‍78 kg
Medal record
Women's judo
Representing the Netherlands
European Championships
Silver medal – second place	2018 Yekaterinburg	Mixed team
IJF Grand Prix
Bronze medal – third place	2018 The Hague	‍–‍78 kg

Profile at external databases
- IJF: 19955
- JudoInside.com: 63556
- Updated on 16 September 2024

Ilona Lucassen (24 May 1997 – 12 June 2020) was a Dutch judoka who was part of the Dutch judo team that trained at the Papendal Sports Centre.

== Sports career ==
Lucassen's greatest achievement was in 2018 when she won the bronze medal in the half-heavyweight category up to 78 kg during the Judo Grand Prix in The Hague, competing against Marhinde Verkerk. In 2018, she was part of the team that won silver during the European Mixed Team Judo Championships in Yekaterinburg, Russia. On 13 October 2019, she won gold in the under 78 kg weight class at the Women's Continental Open in Tallinn, Estonia. She also won gold at the Continental Open in Glasgow and Minsk in 2018. During the Junior European Championships in 2016 in Málaga, Lucassen sustained a serious injury, tearing her cruciate ligaments. After a year of rehabilitation, she resumed competitive judo in 2017.

Lucassen pursued a retail entrepreneurship course to prepare for starting a sports business after her sports career. She was preparing for the 2024 Summer Olympics in Paris. In an interview, she mentioned being inspired by the festive celebration of swimmer Pieter van den Hoogenband's Olympic victory at the Market Square in Geldrop.

== Death ==
Lucassen suffered from depression and, due to the COVID-19 pandemic in the Netherlands, she had been unable to practice judo since 15 March 2020. On 12 June 2020, she died by suicide at the age of 23. Due to unruly behavior, she had been suspended from Papendal for three months the day before her death.
