= Aya Sakagami =

Japanese judoka (born 1997)

Personal information
- Nationality: Japanese
- Born: 8 June 1997 (age 29)
- Occupation: Judoka

Sport
- Country: Japan
- Sport: Judo
- Weight class: ‍–‍48 kg

Achievements and titles
- Asian Champ.: (bronze) (2019)
Medal record
Women's judo
Representing Japan
Asian Championships
Bronze medal – third place	2019 Fujairah	‍–‍48 kg
IJF Grand Prix
Bronze medal – third place	2018 The Hague	‍–‍48 kg
Asian Cadet Championships
Gold medal – first place	2012 Taipei	‍–‍40 kg

Profile at external databases
- IJF: 32657
- JudoInside.com: 86353
- Updated on 30 November 2022

Aya Sakagami (born 8 June 1997) is a Japanese judoka.

Sakagami is a bronze medalist from the 2018 Judo Grand Prix The Hague in the ‍–‍48 kg category.
