= Ivana Maranić =

Croatian judoka (born 1991)

Personal information
- Born: 12 September 1991 (age 34)
- Occupation: Judoka

Sport
- Country: Croatia
- Sport: Judo
- Weight class: ‍–‍78 kg, +78 kg

Achievements and titles
- Olympic Games: R32 (2020)
- World Champ.: 7th (2018)
- European Champ.: 5th (2018)
Medal record
Women's judo
Representing Croatia
IJF Grand Slam
Bronze medal – third place	2013 Baku	‍–‍78 kg
Bronze medal – third place	2021 Baku	+78 kg
IJF Grand Prix
Gold medal – first place	2013 Tashkent	‍–‍78 kg
Silver medal – second place	2012 Baku	+78 kg
Silver medal – second place	2014 Tashkent	‍–‍78 kg
Bronze medal – third place	2014 Tbilisi	‍–‍78 kg
Bronze medal – third place	2014 Samsun	‍–‍78 kg
European U23 Championships
Bronze medal – third place	2013 Samokov	‍–‍78 kg
World Juniors Championships
Bronze medal – third place	2010 Agadir	‍–‍78 kg
European Junior Championships
Bronze medal – third place	2010 Samokov	‍–‍78 kg
European Cadet Championships
Bronze medal – third place	2006 Miskolc	+70 kg

Profile at external databases
- IJF: 3270
- JudoInside.com: 42935
- Updated on 21 November 2022

Ivana Maranić (born 12 September 1991) is a Croatian judoka. She qualified to represent Croatia at the 2020 Summer Olympics in Tokyo 2021, competing in women's +78 kg.
