= Ivana Šutalo =

Croatian judoka (born 1994)

Personal information
- Born: 18 December 1994 (age 31)
- Occupation: Judoka

Sport
- Country: Croatia
- Sport: Judo
- Weight class: +78 kg

Achievements and titles
- World Champ.: R16 (2024)
- European Champ.: R16 (2017, 2018, 2019)
Medal record
Women's judo
Representing Croatia
IJF Grand Prix
Gold medal – first place	2017 Cancún	+78 kg
Bronze medal – third place	2016 Zagreb	+78 kg
Bronze medal – third place	2018 Agadir	+78 kg
European U23 Championships
Gold medal – first place	2016 Tel Aviv	+78 kg
Silver medal – second place	2015 Bratislava	+78 kg
European Junior Championships
Silver medal – second place	2012 Poreč	+78 kg

Profile at external databases
- IJF: 3858
- JudoInside.com: 50462
- Updated on 24 May 2024

Ivana Šutalo (born 18 December 1994) is a Croatian judoka.

Šutalo is the gold medalist of the 2017 Judo Grand Prix Cancún in the +78 kg category.
