= Tessie Savelkouls =

Dutch judoka (born 1992)

Personal information
- Nationality: Dutch
- Born: 11 March 1992 (age 34) Appeltern
- Occupation: Judoka

Sport
- Country: Netherlands
- Sport: Judo
- Weight class: +78 kg
- Retired: 8 October 2021

Achievements and titles
- Olympic Games: 7th (2016)
- World Champ.: 5th (2017)
- European Champ.: (bronze) (2018)
Medal record
Women's judo
Representing the Netherlands
European Championships
Bronze medal – third place	2018 Tel Aviv	+78 kg
World Masters
Gold medal – first place	2019 Qingdao	+78 kg
IJF Grand Slam
Gold medal – first place	2017 Baku	+78 kg
Gold medal – first place	2017 Abu Dhabi	+78 kg
Silver medal – second place	2015 Abu Dhabi	+78 kg
Bronze medal – third place	2016 Paris	+78 kg
IJF Grand Prix
Gold medal – first place	2017 The Hague	+78 kg
Silver medal – second place	2015 Zagreb	+78 kg
Silver medal – second place	2019 Marrakesh	+78 kg
Silver medal – second place	2020 Tel Aviv	+78 kg
Bronze medal – third place	2014 Zagreb	+78 kg
European U23 Championships
Gold medal – first place	2014 Wrocław	+78 kg
Silver medal – second place	2013 Samokov	+78 kg
World Juniors Championships
Bronze medal – third place	2011 Cape Town	+78 kg
European Junior Championships
Bronze medal – third place	2011 Lommel	+78 kg

Profile at external databases
- IJF: 9283
- JudoInside.com: 42315
- Updated on 21 May 2023

Tessie Savelkouls (born 11 March 1992) is a Dutch retired judoka. She was born in Appeltern in the Netherlands. She competed at the 2016 Summer Olympics in Rio de Janeiro, in the women's +78 kg. She also competed in the women's +78 kg event at the 2020 Summer Olympics in Tokyo, Japan.

She is openly lesbian.
