= Larisa Cerić =

Bosnian judoka (born 1991)

Personal information
- Nationality: Bosnian
- Born: 26 January 1991 (age 35) Travnik, SR Bosnia and Herzegovina, SFR Yugoslavia
- Occupation: Judoka

Sport
- Country: Bosnia and Herzegovina
- Sport: Judo
- Weight class: +78 kg
Medal record
Women's judo
Representing Bosnia and Herzegovina
Event	1st	2nd	3rd
World Championships	–	1	1
European Games	–	1	–
European Championships	–	2	1
World Masters	–	–	3
Judo Grand Slam	1	1	2
Judo Grand Prix	2	3	5
Mediterranean Games	–	1	2
European Open	2	–	5
Total	5	9	19
World Championships
Silver medal – second place	2017 Marrakesh	Open
Bronze medal – third place	2018 Baku	+78 kg
European Games
Silver medal – second place	2019 Minsk	+78 kg
European Championships
Silver medal – second place	2014 Montpellier	+78 kg
Silver medal – second place	2018 Tel Aviv	+78 kg
Bronze medal – third place	2017 Warsaw	+78 kg
World Masters
Bronze medal – third place	2016 Guadalajara	+78 kg
Bronze medal – third place	2017 Saint Petersburg	+78 kg
Bronze medal – third place	2018 Guangzhou	+78 kg
IJF Grand Slam
Gold medal – first place	2018 Ekaterinburg	+78 kg
Silver medal – second place	2019 Baku	+78 kg
Bronze medal – third place	2015 Paris	+78 kg
Bronze medal – third place	2016 Tyumen	+78 kg
Bronze medal – third place	2023 Baku	+78 kg
IJF Grand Prix
Gold medal – first place	2016 Zagreb	+78 kg
Gold medal – first place	2017 Zagreb	+78 kg
Silver medal – second place	2017 Antalya	+78 kg
Silver medal – second place	2018 Antalya	+78 kg
Silver medal – second place	2019 Zagreb	+78 kg
Bronze medal – third place	2013 Rijeka	+78 kg
Bronze medal – third place	2014 Budapest	+78 kg
Bronze medal – third place	2016 Almaty	+78 kg
Bronze medal – third place	2017 Düsseldorf	+78 kg
Bronze medal – third place	2018 The Hague	+78 kg
European U23 Championships
Gold medal – first place	2012 Prague	+78 kg
Silver medal – second place	2010 Sarajevo	+78 kg
Bronze medal – third place	2009 Antalya	+78 kg
World Juniors Championships
Gold medal – first place	2009 Paris	+78 kg
Mediterranean Games
Silver medal – second place	2009 Pescara	+78 kg
Bronze medal – third place	2013 Mersin	+78 kg
Bronze medal – third place	2022 Oran	+78 kg

Profile at external databases
- IJF: 721
- JudoInside.com: 47277
- Updated on 25 September 2023

Larisa Cerić (born 26 January 1991) is a Bosnian judoka competing in the women's +78 kg division. She won a silver medal at the 2014 European Judo Championships and a bronze medal at the 2018 World Judo Championships.

At the 2019 European Games Cerić won a silver medal, first ever European Games medal for her country. She also won a gold medal at World Judo Juniors Championships in 2009, which is first world title in any Olympic sport for Bosnia and Herzegovina.

Cerić competed at the 2016 Summer Olympics and 2020 Summer Olympics, losing both times in the second round of the competition. At the 2020 Summer Olympics she was one of the flag bearers along with Amel Tuka.

Cerić holds notable wins over Olympic medalists Emilie Andeol (gold), Iryna Kindzerska (bronze), Yu Song (bronze), Kanae Yamabe (bronze) and Lucija Polavder (bronze).

Cerić is among five competitors with the most European Judo Championships medals in +78 category (4) since it was introduced in 1998, placing behind Karina Bryant (8), Tea Donguzashvili (8), Lucija Polavder (7) and Anne-Sophie Mondiere (5).

In 2018, in +78 kg category for seniors, Cerić achieved World No. 1 ranking.

Cerić won one of the bronze medals in the women's +78 kg event at the 2022 Mediterranean Games held in Oran, Algeria.

== Achievements and awards ==
Year	Tournament	Place	Weight class
2019	European Championship	2nd	+78 kg
2018	World Championship	3rd	+78 kg
2018	European Championship	2nd	+78 kg
2017	European Championship	3rd	+78 kg
2017	World Championship	2nd	Open
2014	European Championship	2nd	+78 kg

Awards

- Bosnian Sportswoman of the Year: 2009, 2010, 2013, 2014, 2017, 2018, 2019
- Olympic Committee of Bosnia and Herzegovina Sportwoman of the Year: 2012, 2014, 2017, 2018
- Sixth April Award of Sarajevo

Olympic Games
Preceded by Amel Tuka	Flagbearer for Bosnia and Herzegovina; Tokyo 2020 (shared with Amel Tuka); Paris 2024 (shared with Mesud Pezer)	Succeeded by
