= Yelyzaveta Kalanina =

Ukrainian judoka (born 1995)

Personal information
- Nationality: Ukrainian
- Born: Єлизавета Каланіна; 1 February 1995 (age 31) Kremenchuk, Ukraine
- Occupation: Judoka

Sport
- Country: Ukraine
- Sport: Judo
- Weight class: +78 kg

Achievements and titles
- Olympic Games: R16 (2020)
- World Champ.: R16 (2018)
- European Champ.: (bronze) (2018, 2020)
Medal record
Women's judo
Representing Ukraine
European Championships
Bronze medal – third place	2018 Tel Aviv	+78 kg
Bronze medal – third place	2020 Prague	+78 kg
IJF Grand Slam
Gold medal – first place	2019 Baku	+78 kg
Bronze medal – third place	2017 Baku	+78 kg
IJF Grand Prix
Gold medal – first place	2018 Agadir	+78 kg
Silver medal – second place	2017 Hohhot	+78 kg
Silver medal – second place	2019 Tel Aviv	+78 kg
Bronze medal – third place	2018 Zagreb	+78 kg
Bronze medal – third place	2018 Tashkent	+78 kg
European U23 Championships
Bronze medal – third place	2016 Tel Aviv	+78 kg
World Juniors Championships
Bronze medal – third place	2015 Abu Dhabi	+78 kg
European Junior Championships
Bronze medal – third place	2012 Poreč	+78 kg
World Cadets Championships
Silver medal – second place	2011 Kyiv	+70 kg
European Cadet Championships
Bronze medal – third place	2011 Cottonera	+70 kg
Summer Universiade
Bronze medal – third place	2013 Kazan	Open
European Youth Olympic Festival
Gold medal – first place	2011 Trabzon	+70 kg

Profile at external databases
- IJF: 8426
- JudoInside.com: 74800
- Updated on 21 May 2023

Yelyzaveta Kalanina (Ukrainian: Єлизавета Каланіна, born 1 February 1995) is a Ukrainian judoka.

== Career ==
Yelyzaveta's first international success came in July 2011 when she won a gold medal at the 2011 European Youth Summer Olympic Festival in Trabzon, Turkey. Two years later she represented Ukraine at the 2013 Summer Universiade in Russian Kazan where she was third in the open weight competition.

On April 28, 2018, she won a bronze medal in +78 kg category at the 2018 European Judo Championships in Tel Aviv, Israel.

In 2021, she competed in the women's +78 kg event at the 2020 Summer Olympics in Tokyo, Japan.
