= Iryna Kindzerska =

Ukrainian-born Azerbaijani judoka

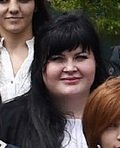
- Kindzerska in 2017

Personal information
- Born: 13 June 1991 (age 35) Kamianets-Podilskyi, Ukrainian SSR, Soviet Union
- Occupation: Judoka

Sport
- Country: Ukraine (2009–17); Azerbaijan (2017–present)
- Sport: Judo
- Weight class: +78 kg

Achievements and titles
- Olympic Games: (bronze) (2020)
- World Champ.: (bronze) (2017)
- European Champ.: (silver) (2020)
Medal record
Women's judo
Representing Ukraine
European Championships
Bronze medal – third place	2013 Budapest	+78 kg
IJF Grand Slam
Bronze medal – third place	2015 Paris	+78 kg
Bronze medal – third place	2015 Tokyo	+78 kg
IJF Grand Prix
Gold medal – first place	2017 Düsseldorf	+78 kg
Silver medal – second place	2014 Astana	+78 kg
Silver medal – second place	2014 Tashkent	+78 kg
Bronze medal – third place	2011 Baku	+78 kg
Bronze medal – third place	2011 Abu Dhabi	+78 kg
Bronze medal – third place	2014 Jeju	+78 kg
Bronze medal – third place	2015 Jeju	+78 kg
Bronze medal – third place	2016 Budapest	+78 kg
World Juniors Championships
Silver medal – second place	2009 Paris	+78 kg
European Junior Championships
Gold medal – first place	2009 Yerevan	+78 kg
European Cadet Championships
Bronze medal – third place	2007 Valletta	+70 kg
Representing Azerbaijan
Olympic Games
Bronze medal – third place	2020 Tokyo	+78 kg
World Championships
Bronze medal – third place	2017 Budapest	+78 kg
European Games
Bronze medal – third place	2019 Minsk	+78 kg
European Championships
Silver medal – second place	2020 Prague	+78 kg
World Masters
Silver medal – second place	2019 Qingdao	+78 kg
Silver medal – second place	2021 Doha	+78 kg
IJF Grand Slam
Silver medal – second place	2017 Abu Dhabi	+78 kg
Silver medal – second place	2019 Paris	+78 kg
Silver medal – second place	2020 Düsseldorf	+78 kg
Bronze medal – third place	2018 Paris	+78 kg
Bronze medal – third place	2018 Düsseldorf	+78 kg
Bronze medal – third place	2018 Abu Dhabi	+78 kg
Bronze medal – third place	2019 Düsseldorf	+78 kg
Bronze medal – third place	2019 Baku	+78 kg
IJF Grand Prix
Gold medal – first place	2018 Tashkent	+78 kg
Gold medal – first place	2019 Tel Aviv	+78 kg
Gold medal – first place	2019 Antalya	+78 kg
Bronze medal – third place	2019 Zagreb	+78 kg

Profile at external databases
- IJF: 1154, 39329
- JudoInside.com: 37262
- Updated on 5 September 2022

Iryna Aliyeva, née Iryna Kindzerska (born 13 June 1991) is a Ukrainian and Azerbaijani judoka. In 2021, she won a bronze medal in the women's +78 kg event at the 2020 Summer Olympics held in Tokyo, Japan. She is also a two-time medalist at the European Judo Championships and a bronze medalist at both the 2017 World Judo Championships and the 2019 European Games.

== Career ==
She competed at the 2012 Summer Olympics in the +78 kg event, for Ukraine.

Some references point to the fact that Kindzerska was born in Bakota, Ukraine. The little town of Bakota has officially disappeared in 1981 as it was submerged by waters of the Dniester Reservoir. In 2016, Kindzerska married an Azerbaijani athlete. They moved to Azerbaijan a year later and she has since represented this country. In 2017, she won a bronze medal at the World Championship, defeating Tessie Savelkouls in the bronze medal match.

She won bronze at the 2019 European Games.

In 2021, she won the silver medal in her event at the 2021 Judo World Masters held in Doha, Qatar.
