= Mercédesz Szigetvári =

Hungarian judoka (born 1998)

Personal information
- Born: 14 May 1998 (age 28)
- Occupation: Judoka

Sport
- Country: Hungary
- Sport: Judo
- Weight class: +78 kg

Achievements and titles
- World Champ.: R16 (2019, 2021)
- European Champ.: 7th (2017)
Medal record
Women's judo
Representing Hungary
IJF Grand Prix
Silver medal – second place	2021 Zagreb	+78 kg
Bronze medal – third place	2017 Tbilisi	+78 kg
European U23 Championships
Bronze medal – third place	2019 Izhevsk	+78 kg
Bronze medal – third place	2020 Poreč	+78 kg
European Junior Championships
Gold medal – first place	2018 Sofia	+78 kg
Bronze medal – third place	2017 Maribor	+78 kg
European Cadet Championships
Bronze medal – third place	2014 Athens	+70 kg

Profile at external databases
- IJF: 17999
- JudoInside.com: 86297
- Updated on 7 December 2022

Mercédesz Szigetvári (born 14 May 1998) is a Hungarian judoka.

Szigetvári is the silver medalist from the 2021 Judo Grand Prix Zagreb in the +78 kg category.
