= Sandra Jablonskytė =

Lithuanian judoka (born 1992)

Personal information
- Born: 8 May 1992 (age 34) Kaunas, Lithuania
- Occupation: Judoka

Sport
- Country: Lithuania
- Sport: Judo
- Weight class: +78 kg

Achievements and titles
- Olympic Games: R16 (2020)
- World Champ.: R16 (2014)
- European Champ.: 5th (2014, 2021)
Medal record
Women's judo
Representing Lithuania
IJF Grand Slam
Bronze medal – third place	2014 Baku	+78 kg
Bronze medal – third place	2019 Ekaterinburg	+78 kg
IJF Grand Prix
Silver medal – second place	2014 Tbilisi	+78 kg
Silver medal – second place	2017 The Hague	+78 kg
Bronze medal – third place	2016 Zagreb	+78 kg
Bronze medal – third place	2018 Tbilisi	+78 kg
World Juniors Championships
Bronze medal – third place	2009 Paris	+78 kg

Profile at external databases
- IJF: 1369
- JudoInside.com: 47713
- Updated on 21 November 2022

Sandra Jablonskytė (born 8 May 1992) is a Lithuanian judoka.

Jablonskytė is a bronze medalist from the 2019 Judo Grand Slam Ekaterinburg in the +78 kg category. In 2021, she competed in the women's +78 kg event at the 2021 World Judo Championships held in Budapest, Hungary. She also competed in the women's +78 kg event at the 2020 Summer Olympics in Tokyo, Japan.

In February 2023 Jablonskytė was elected as president of Lithuanian Judo Federation.
