= 2015 World Judo Championships – Men's 66 kg =

Judo competition

Judo Men's 66 kg at the 2015 World Judo Championships
- Venue: Alau Ice Palace
- Location: Astana, Kazakhstan
- Date: 25 August
- Competitors: 60 from 48 nations
- Total prize money: 14,000$

Medalists
| gold medal | An Ba-ul (1st title) | South Korea |
| silver medal | Mikhail Pulyaev | Russia |
| bronze medal | Golan Pollack | Israel |
| bronze medal | Rishod Sobirov | Uzbekistan |

Competition at external databases
- Links: IJF • JudoInside

The men's 66 kg competition of the 2015 World Judo Championships was held on 25 August 2015.

== Results ==
=== Finals ===
Semi-finals
(Israel) Golan Pollack | 000
(South Korea) An Ba-ul | 000
(Russia) Mikhail Pulyaev | 100
(Kazakhstan) Yeldos Zhumakanov | 000

Final
(South Korea) An Ba-ul | 100
(Russia) Mikhail Pulyaev | 000

=== Repechage ===
| Repechage | | Third place |
| (Italy) Elio Verde | 000 |
| (Uzbekistan) Rishod Sobirov | 111 | (Uzbekistan) Rishod Sobirov | 010 |
| | | (Kazakhstan) Yeldos Zhumakanov | 000 |

| Repechage | | Third place |
| (Germany) Sebastian Seidl | 000 |
| (Mongolia) Davaadorjiin Tömörkhüleg | 000 | (Mongolia) Davaadorjiin Tömörkhüleg | 000 |
| | | (Israel) Golan Pollack | 001 |

=== Pool A ===
First Round
(Israel) Golan Pollack | 010
(Spain) David Ramírez | 000
(France) Loïc Korval | 100
(Kazakhstan) Azamat Mukanov | 000
(Morocco) Imad Bassou | 100
(Kyrgyzstan) Ruslan Dzahnybek | 011
(Azerbaijan) Nijat Shikhalizade | 110
(Mozambique) Bruno Luzia | 000
(Zambia) Mathews Punza | 001
(Canada) Antoine Bouchard | 100
(Djibouti) Fouad Anass | 000
(Serbia) Ilija Ciganović | 100
(Turkey) Sinan Sandal | 000
(Italy) Elio Verde | 001

Second Round
(Ukraine) Georgii Zantaraia | 000
(Israel) Golan Pollack | 010
(France) Loïc Korval | 100
(Morocco) Imad Bassou | 000
(Azerbaijan) Nijat Shikhalizade | 010
(Canada) Antoine Bouchard | 000
(Serbia) Ilija Ciganović | 000
(Italy) Elio Verde | 010

Third Round
(Israel) Golan Pollack | 100
(France) Loïc Korval | 001
(Azerbaijan) Nijat Shikhalizade | 000
(Italy) Elio Verde | 101

Quarterfinals
(Israel) Golan Pollack | 001
(Italy) Elio Verde | 000

=== Pool B ===
First Round
(South Korea) An Ba-ul | 100
(Cuba) Carlos Tondique | 000
(Aruba) Jayme Mata | 000
(Russia) Kamal Khan-Magomedov | 100
(Mongolia) Khashbaataryn Tsagaanbaatar | 100
(Argentina) Fernando González | 000
(Japan) Masashi Ebinuma | 100
(Portugal) Diogo César | 000
(Brazil) Charles Chibana | 000
(China) Ma Duanbin | 100
(Afghanistan) Abdul Fazli | 000
(Armenia) Arsen Ghazaryan | 100
(Venezuela) Sergio Mattey | 000
(Uzbekistan) Rishod Sobirov | 100

Second Round
(Belarus) Dzmitry Shershan | 000
(South Korea) An Ba-ul | 001
(Russia) Kamal Khan-Magomedov | 100
(Mongolia) Khashbaataryn Tsagaanbaatar | 000
(Japan) Masashi Ebinuma | 011
(China) Ma Duanbin | 000
(Armenia) Arsen Ghazaryan | 000
(Uzbekistan) Rishod Sobirov | 100

Third Round
(South Korea) An Ba-ul | 010
(Russia) Kamal Khan-Magomedov | 000
(Japan) Masashi Ebinuma | 000
(Uzbekistan) Rishod Sobirov | 100

Quarterfinals
(South Korea) An Ba-ul | 010
(Uzbekistan) Rishod Sobirov | 000

=== Pool C ===
First Round
(North Korea) Hyon Song-chol | 000
(France) David Larose | 011
(Saudi Arabia) Sulaiman Hamad | 000
(Peru) Jesús Gavidia | 101
(Libya) Ahmed El-Kawisah | 000
(Jordan) Almashaqbeh Mohammad | 000
(Japan) Kengo Takaichi | 000
(Spain) Sugoi Uriarte | 100
(Israel) Baruch Shmailov | 000
(Portugal) Sergiu Oleinic | 001
(Azerbaijan) Hidayat Heydarov | 101
(China) Amu Erchaogetu | 000
(Germany) Sebastian Seidl | 100
(Costa Rica) Ian Sancho | 000

Second Round
(Russia) Mikhail Pulyaev | 100
(France) David Larose | 000
(Peru) Jesús Gavidia | 000
(Libya) Ahmed El-Kawisah | 000
(Spain) Sugoi Uriarte | 000
(Portugal) Sergiu Oleinic | 010
(Azerbaijan) Hidayat Heydarov | 000
(Germany) Sebastian Seidl | 001

Third Round
(Russia) Mikhail Pulyaev | 110
(Peru) Jesús Gavidia | 000
(Portugal) Sergiu Oleinic | 000
(Germany) Sebastian Seidl | 000

Quarterfinals
(Russia) Mikhail Pulyaev | 100
(Germany) Sebastian Seidl | 000

=== Pool D ===
First Round
(Tajikistan) Umed Abdurakhimov | 000
(Serbia) Marko Vukićević | 101
(Poland) Aleksander Beta | 000
(Hungary) Bence Zámbori | 100
(Ukraine) Gevorg Khachatrian | 110
(South Africa) Siyabulela Mabulu | 000
(United Kingdom) Colin Oates | 100
(Turkmenistan) Kemal Amanov | 000
(Slovenia) Andraž Jereb | 100
(Kyrgyzstan) Bektur Rysmambetov | 000
(Algeria) Houd Zourdani | 000
(Tunisia) Houssem Khalfaoui | 100
(Cyprus) Andreas Krassas | 010
(Kazakhstan) Yeldos Zhumakanov | 100

Second Round
(Mongolia) Davaadorjiin Tömörkhüleg | 101
(Serbia) Marko Vukićević | 000
(Hungary) Bence Zámbori | 000
(Ukraine) Gevorg Khachatrian | 100
(United Kingdom) Colin Oates | 000
(Slovenia) Andraž Jereb | 000
(Tunisia) Houssem Khalfaoui | 000
(Kazakhstan) Yeldos Zhumakanov | 100

Third Round
(Mongolia) Davaadorjiin Tömörkhüleg | 110
(Ukraine) Gevorg Khachatrian | 000
(United Kingdom) Colin Oates | 000
(Kazakhstan) Yeldos Zhumakanov | 100

Quarterfinals
(Mongolia) Davaadorjiin Tömörkhüleg | 000
(Kazakhstan) Yeldos Zhumakanov | 101

== Prize money ==
The sums listed bring the total prizes awarded to 14,000$ for the individual event.

| Medal | Total | Judoka | Coach |
|---|---|---|---|
| Gold | 6,000$ | 4,800$ | 1,200$ |
| Silver | 4,000$ | 3,200$ | 800$ |
| Bronze | 2,000$ | 1,600$ | 400$ |
