= 2014 World Judo Championships – Men's team =

Judo competition

Judo Men's team at the 2014 World Judo Championships
- Venue: Traktor Ice Arena
- Location: Chelyabinsk, Russia
- Date: 31 August
- Competitors: 70 from 14 nations
- Total prize money: 50,000$

Medalists
gold medal	Japan (5th title)
silver medal	Russia
bronze medal	Germany
bronze medal	Georgia

Competition at external databases
- Links: IJF • EJU • JudoInside

The men's team competition of the 2014 World Judo Championships was held on 31 August.

== Medalists ==
Gold	Silver	Bronze
Japan; Mashu Baker (–90 kg); Masashi Ebinuma (–66 kg); Daiki Kamikawa (+90 kg); Takanori Nagase (–81 kg); Riki Nakaya (–73 kg); Daiki Nishiyama (–90 kg); Shohei Ono (–73 kg); Ryu Shichinohe (+90 kg); Kengo Takaichi (–66 kg)	Russia; Kirill Denisov (–90 kg); Alim Gadanov (–66 kg); Denis Iartcev (–73 kg); Aslan Kambiev (+90 kg); Murat Khabachirov (–81 kg); Kamal Khan-Magomedov (–66 kg); Magomed Magomedov (–90 kg); Sirazhudin Magomedov (–81 kg); Zelimkhan Ozdoev (–73 kg); Andrey Volkov (+90 kg)	Germany; Andreas Breitbarth (+90 kg); Sven Maresch (–81 kg); Marc Odenthal (–90 kg); Dimitri Peters (+90 kg); René Schneider (–66 kg); Sebastian Seidl (–66 kg); Christopher Völk (–73 kg)
Japan; Mashu Baker (–90 kg); Masashi Ebinuma (–66 kg); Daiki Kamikawa (+90 kg); Takanori Nagase (–81 kg); Riki Nakaya (–73 kg); Daiki Nishiyama (–90 kg); Shohei Ono (–73 kg); Ryu Shichinohe (+90 kg); Kengo Takaichi (–66 kg)	Russia; Kirill Denisov (–90 kg); Alim Gadanov (–66 kg); Denis Iartcev (–73 kg); Aslan Kambiev (+90 kg); Murat Khabachirov (–81 kg); Kamal Khan-Magomedov (–66 kg); Magomed Magomedov (–90 kg); Sirazhudin Magomedov (–81 kg); Zelimkhan Ozdoev (–73 kg); Andrey Volkov (+90 kg)	Georgia; Beka Gviniashvili (–90 kg); Shalva Kardava (–66 kg); Varlam Liparteliani (–90 kg); Levani Matiashvili (+90 kg); Adam Okruashvili (+90 kg); Amiran Papinashvili (–66 kg); Zebeda Rekhviashvili (–81 kg); Lasha Shavdatuashvili (–73 kg); Nugzar Tatalashvili (–73 kg); Avtandil Tchrikishvili (–81 kg)

== Results ==
First Round
Georgia	5
Czech Republic	0
Japan	5
Mongolia	0
Algeria	2
China	3
Cuba	3
Tajikistan	2
Germany	5
Slovenia	0
France	2
Brazil	3

Quarterfinals
Georgia	4
Kazakhstan	1
Japan	5
China	0
Russia	4
Cuba	1
Germany	3
Brazil	2

Semifinals
Georgia	1
Japan	4
Russia	4
Germany	1

Final
Japan	3
Russia	2

=== Repechage ===
Repechage		Third place
Kazakhstan	4
China	1	Kazakhstan	0
		Germany	5

Repechage		Third place
Cuba	2
Brazil	3	Brazil	2
		Georgia	3

== Prize money ==
The sums listed bring the total prizes awarded to 50,000$ for the specific team event.

Medal	Total	Judoka	Coach
Gold	25,000$	20,000$	5,000$
Silver	15,000$	12,000$	3,000$
Bronze	5,000$	4,000$	1,000$
