= 2014 World Judo Championships – Men's 66 kg =

Judo competition

Judo Men's 66 kg at the 2014 World Judo Championships
- Venue: Traktor Ice Arena
- Location: Chelyabinsk, Russia
- Date: 26 August 2014
- Competitors: 64 from 49 nations
- Total prize money: 14,000$

Medalists
gold medal	Masashi Ebinuma (3rd title)	Japan
silver medal	Mikhail Pulyaev	Russia
bronze medal	Georgii Zantaraia	Ukraine
bronze medal	Kamal Khan-Magomedov	Russia

Competition at external databases
- Links: IJF • JudoInside

The men's 66 kg competition of the 2014 World Judo Championships was held on 26 August.

== Medalists ==
Gold	Silver	Bronze
Masashi Ebinuma (JPN)	Mikhail Pulyaev (RUS)	Georgii Zantaraia (UKR); Kamal Khan-Magomedov (RUS)

== Results ==
=== Finals ===
Semi-finals
(France) Loïc Korval	000
(Japan) Masashi Ebinuma	000
(Russia) Mikhail Pulyaev	010
(Japan) Kengo Takaichi	000

Final
(Japan) Masashi Ebinuma	100
(Russia) Mikhail Pulyaev	000

=== Repechage ===
Repechage		Third place
(Uzbekistan) Rishod Sobirov	000
(Ukraine) Georgii Zantaraia	010	(Ukraine) Georgii Zantaraia	000
		(Japan) Kengo Takaichi	000

Repechage		Third place
(Russia) Kamal Khan-Magomedov	110
(China) Ma Duanbin	000	(Russia) Kamal Khan-Magomedov	001
		(France) Loïc Korval	000

=== Pool A ===
First Round
(Brazil) Charles Chibana	110
(Armenia) Davit Ghazaryan	000
(Tajikistan) Rasul Abdusharipov	000
(South Korea) Youn Tae-ho	100
(Serbia) Ilija Ciganović	100
(Kyrgyzstan) Azat Kubakaev	000
(Uzbekistan) Rishod Sobirov	011
(Germany) René Schneider	000
(Belarus) Dzmitry Shershan	110
(Canada) Patrick Gagné	000
(Slovenia) Andraž Jereb	100
(Paraguay) Abraham Acevedo	000
(Chinese Taipei) Chien Chia-hung	000
(United States) Bradford Bolen	000
(Papua New Guinea) Ashaan Nelson	000
(France) Loïc Korval	101

Quarterfinals
(Brazil) Charles Chibana	001
(South Korea) Youn Tae-ho	001
(Serbia) Ilija Ciganović	000
(Uzbekistan) Rishod Sobirov	100
(Belarus) Dzmitry Shershan	100
(Slovenia) Andraž Jereb	000
(United States) Bradford Bolen	000
(France) Loïc Korval	100

Semifinals
(Brazil) Charles Chibana	000
(Uzbekistan) Rishod Sobirov	100
(Belarus) Dzmitry Shershan	000
(France) Loïc Korval	100

Final
(Uzbekistan) Rishod Sobirov	000
(France) Loïc Korval	110

=== Pool B ===
First Round
(Ukraine) Georgii Zantaraia	100
(Egypt) Mohamed Abdelmawgoud	000
(Venezuela) Ricardo Valderrama	000
(Portugal) Sergiu Oleinic	000
(New Zealand) Alexander Bishop	110
(Yemen) Mustafa Khousrof	000
(Mongolia) Batsuuri Adiya	100
(Peru) Alonso Wong	000
(Japan) Masashi Ebinuma	100
(Aruba) Jayme Mata	000
(Saudi Arabia) Sulaiman Hamad	000
(North Korea) Hyon Song-chol	002
(Cyprus) Christos Kaouranis	000
(Algeria) Houd Zourdani	100
(Kazakhstan) Sergey Lim	100
(Italy) Elio Verde	000

Quarterfinals
(Ukraine) Georgii Zantaraia	110
(Venezuela) Ricardo Valderrama	000
(New Zealand) Alexander Bishop	010
(Mongolia) Batsuuri Adiya	101
(Japan) Masashi Ebinuma	010
(North Korea) Hyon Song-chol	000
(Algeria) Houd Zourdani	000
(Kazakhstan) Sergey Lim	110

Semifinals
(Ukraine) Georgii Zantaraia	101
(Mongolia) Batsuuri Adiya	001
(Japan) Masashi Ebinuma	102
(Kazakhstan) Sergey Lim	000

Final
(Ukraine) Georgii Zantaraia	000
(Japan) Masashi Ebinuma	000

=== Pool C ===
First Round
(Russia) Mikhail Pulyaev	100
(Moldova) Valeri Muravski	000
(Papua New Guinea) Raymond Ovinou	000
(Tunisia) Houcem Khalfaoui	100
(Burundi) Karim Wakabonye	000
(Kyrgyzstan) Almaz Altynbek Uulu	100
(Portugal) Diogo César	110
(Zambia) Mathews Punza	000
(Russia) Kamal Khan-Magomedov	100
(Uruguay) David Prestes	000
(Algeria) Fethi Nourine	103
(Djibouti) Fouad Anas	000
(Poland) Paweł Zagrodnik	100
(Hong Kong) Chui Chun Sing	000
(Venezuela) Sergio Mattey	011
(Belgium) Jasper Lefevere	013

Quarterfinals
(Russia) Mikhail Pulyaev	110
(Tunisia) Houcem Khalfaoui	000
(Kyrgyzstan) Almaz Altynbek Uulu	000
(Portugal) Diogo César	100
(Russia) Kamal Khan-Magomedov	000
(Algeria) Fethi Nourine	000
(Poland) Paweł Zagrodnik	001
(Belgium) Jasper Lefevere	001

Semifinals
(Russia) Mikhail Pulyaev	100
(Portugal) Diogo César	000
(Russia) Kamal Khan-Magomedov	100
(Poland) Paweł Zagrodnik	010

Final
(Russia) Mikhail Pulyaev	100
(Russia) Kamal Khan-Magomedov	000

=== Pool D ===
First Round
(Mongolia) Davaadorjiin Tömörkhüleg	010
(Canada) Antoine Bouchard	000
(Tajikistan) Samandar Kalandarov	000
(Germany) Sebastian Seidl	101
(Belarus) Vae Tutkhalian	010
(Kazakhstan) Zhansay Smagulov	101
(China) Ma Duanbin	010
(Cuba) Gilberto Solar	001
(United Kingdom) Colin Oates	100
(North Korea) Kim Chol	000
(Peru) Jesus Gavidia	000
(Turkmenistan) Kemal Amanov	000
(Mozambique) Bruno Luzia	000
(Spain) Sugoi Uriarte	101
(Japan) Kengo Takaichi	101
(Hungary) Bence Zámbori	000

Quarterfinals
(Mongolia) Davaadorjiin Tömörkhüleg	000
(Germany) Sebastian Seidl	000
(Kazakhstan) Zhansay Smagulov	000
(China) Ma Duanbin	000
(United Kingdom) Colin Oates	100
(Peru) Jesus Gavidia	011
(Spain) Sugoi Uriarte	000
(Japan) Kengo Takaichi	000

Semifinals
(Mongolia) Davaadorjiin Tömörkhüleg	010
(China) Ma Duanbin	100
(United Kingdom) Colin Oates	000
(Japan) Kengo Takaichi	001

Final
(China) Ma Duanbin	000
(Japan) Kengo Takaichi	100

== Prize money ==
The sums listed bring the total prizes awarded to 14,000$ for the individual event.

Medal	Total	Judoka	Coach
Gold	6,000$	4,800$	1,200$
Silver	4,000$	3,200$	800$
Bronze	2,000$	1,600$	400$
