= 2014 in combat sports =

== Amateur boxing ==
- April 10–25: 2014 AIBA Youth World Boxing Championships in (Bulgaria) Sofia
  - Men's light fly winner: (Kazakhstan) Shalkar Aikhynbay
  - Men's fly winner: (United States) Shakur Stevenson
  - Men's bantam winner: (Cuba) Javier Ibanez
  - Men's light winner: (Kazakhstan) Ablaikhan Zhussupov
  - Men's light welter winner: (Russia) Bibert Tumenov
  - Men's welter winner: (Uzbekistan) Bektemir Melikuziev
  - Men's middle winner: (Russia) Dmitrii Nesterov
  - Men's light heavy winner: (Bulgaria) Blagoy Naydenov
  - Men's heavy winner: (Cuba) Yordan Hernandez
  - Men's super heavy winner: (United States) Daramni Rock
  - Women's fly winner: (Armenia) Anush Grigoryan
  - Women's light winner: (United States) Jajaira Gonzalez
  - Women's middle winner: (Poland) Elzbieta Wojcik
- August 23–27: 2014 Summer Youth Olympics
  - Cuba and the United States won 2 gold medals each. Cuba, the USA, and Italy won 3 overall medals each.
- November 13–25: 2014 AIBA Women's World Boxing Championships in (South Korea) Jeju City
  - Russia won both the gold and overall medal tallies.

== Fencing ==
- January 16 – October 26: 2013–14 Fencing World Cup
- June 1–6: 2014 Pan American Fencing Championships in (Costa Rica) San José
  - Men's Individual Épée winner: (Venezuela) Francisco Limardo
  - Men's Individual Foil winner: (United States) Gerek Meinhardt
  - Men's Individual Sabre winner: (United States) Eli Dershwitz
  - Men's Team Épée winners: Cuba
  - Men's Team Foil winners: United States
  - Men's Team Sabre winner: United States
  - Women's Individual Épée winner: (United States) Lee Kiefer
  - Women's Individual Épée winner: (United States) Courtney Hurley
  - Women's Individual Sabre winner: (Argentina) María Belén Pérez Maurice
  - Women's Team Épée winners: United States
  - Women's Team Foil winners: United States
  - Women's Team Sabre winners: United States
  - The United States won both the gold and overall medal tallies.
- June 7–14: 2014 European Fencing Championships in (France) Strasbourg
  - Italy won the gold medal tally. Russia won the overall medal tally.
- June 20–24: 2014 African Fencing Championships in Cairo
  - Host nation, Egypt, and Tunisia won 6 gold medals each. However, Egypt won the overall medal tally.
- July 2–7: 2014 2014 Asian Fencing Championships in Suwon
  - Host nation, South Korea, won both the gold and overall medal tallies.
- July 15–23: 2014 World Fencing Championships in Kazan
  - France, Italy, and host nation, Russia, won 3 gold medals each. Italy and Russia won 8 overall medals each.
- August 17–20: 2014 Summer Youth Olympics
  - Boys' Individual Sabre: (gold) (Russia) Ivan Ilin; (silver) (South Korea) Kim Dong-ju; (bronze) (China) Yan Yinghui
  - Boys' Individual Épée: (gold) (Hungary) Patrik Esztergályos; (silver) (Sweden) Linus Islas Flygare; (bronze) (Russia) Ivan Limarev
  - Boys' Individual Foil: (gold) (Poland) Andrzej Rządkowsk; (silver) (Hong Kong) Ryan Chun Yin Choi; (bronze) (France) Enguerrand Roger
  - Girls' Individual Foil: (gold) (United States) Sabrina Massialas; (silver) (Japan) Karin Miyawaki; (bronze) (China) Huang Ali
  - Girls' Individual Épée: (gold) (South Korea) Lee Sin-hee; (silver) (Italy) Eleonora de Marchi; (bronze) (Sweden) Åsa Linde
  - Girls' Individual Sabre: (gold) (Russia) Alina Moseyko; (silver) (Italy) Chiara Crovari; (bronze) (Hungary) Petra Záhonyi
  - Mixed Continental Team: (gold) Team Asia-Oceania One; (silver) Team Europe One; (bronze) Team Europe Two
- October 21–26: 2014 FIE World Masters Championships in (Hungary) Debrecen
  - Italy and the United States won 5 gold medals each. Germany won the overall medal tally.

== Judo ==
- January 25 – December 7: 2014 International Judo Federation Calendar of Events
- January 25 – November 9: 2014 AJU African Open
  - January 25 & 26: 2014 African Open #1 in (Morocco) Casablanca
    - France won both the gold and overall medal tallies.
  - November 8 & 9: 2014 African Open #2 (final) in (Mauritius) Port Louis
    - Algeria and Great Britain won 3 gold medals each. Algeria won the overall medal tally.
- February 1 – October 5: 2014 EJU European Open
  - February 1 & 2: 2014 European Open #1 in (Bulgaria) Sofia
    - Germany, Hungary, and Israel all tied with 2 gold medals each. Ukraine won the overall medal tally.
  - February 15 & 16: 2014 European Open #2 in (Austria) Oberwart
    - Japan won both the gold and overall medal tallies.
  - February 15 & 16: 2014 European Open #3 in (Italy) Rome
    - Japan won both the gold and overall medal tallies.
  - March 1 & 2: 2014 European Open #4 in (Czech Republic) Prague
    - Seven different nations all share 1 gold medal each. However, Hungary won the overall medal tally.
  - March 1 & 2: 2014 European Open #5 in (Poland) Warsaw
    - Seven different nations all share 1 gold medal each. However, France won the overall medal tally.
  - May 31 & June 1: 2014 European Open #6 in (Spain) Madrid
    - China, Italy, Netherlands, and Ukraine won 2 gold medals each. However, France won the overall medal tally.
  - September 27 & 28: 2014 European Open #7 in (Estonia) Tallinn
    - The Netherlands won the gold medal tally. Russia won the overall medal tally.
  - October 4: 2014 European Open #8 (final and women only) in (United Kingdom) Glasgow
    - Japan won the gold medal tally. France, Germany, and Japan won 7 overall medals each.
  - October 4 & 5: 2014 European Open #9 (final and men only) in Lisbon
    - Japan won the gold medal tally. Japan and host nation, Portugal, won 5 overall medals each.
- February 8 – December 7: 2014 Judo Grand Slam
  - February 8 & 9 2014 Judo Grand Slam at Paris
    - Japan won the gold medal tally. Host nation, France, won the overall medal tally.
  - May 9–11 2014 Judo Grand Slam at (Azerbaijan) Baku
    - France won the gold medal tally. Russia won the overall medal tally.
  - July 12 & 13 2014 Judo Grand Slam at (Russia) Tyumen
    - Japan won both the gold and overall medal tallies.
  - October 31 – November 2 2014 Judo Grand Slam at (United Arab Emirates) Abu Dhabi
    - Germany won the gold and overall medal tallies.
  - December 5–7 2014 Judo Grand Slam at Tokyo (final GS)
    - Host nation, Japan, won both the gold and overall medal tallies.
- February 21 – November 29: 2014 Judo Grand Prix
  - February 21–23 2014 Judo Grand Prix at (Germany) Düsseldorf
    - Japan won both the gold and overall medal tallies.
  - March 21–23 2014 Judo Grand Prix at (Georgia (country)) Tbilisi
    - Host nation, Georgia, won both the gold and overall medal tallies.
  - March 28–30 2014 Judo Grand Prix at (Turkey) Samsun
    - Germany won both the gold and overall medal tallies.
  - June 6–8 2014 Judo Grand Prix at Havana
    - Georgia won the gold medal tally. Cuba and Russia won 8 overall medals each.
  - June 21 & 22 2014 Judo Grand Prix at (Hungary) Budapest
    - Japan won both the gold and overall medal tallies.
  - July 4–6 2014 Judo Grand Prix at Ulaanbaatar
    - Both Japan and host nation, Mongolia, tied in the gold and overall medal tallies.
  - September 12–14 2014 Judo Grand Prix at (Croatia) Zagreb
    - Four nations won two gold medals each. Four nations won four overall medals each.
  - October 10–12 2014 Judo Grand Prix at Astana
    - Hungary and host nation, Kazakhstan, won 2 gold medals each. However, Germany won the overall medal tally.
  - October 16–18 2014 Judo Grand Prix at (Uzbekistan) Tashkent
    - Mongolia won both the gold and overall medal tallies.
  - November 19–21 2014 Judo Grand Prix at (China) Qingdao
    - Russia won the gold medal tally. Japan won the overall medal tally.
  - November 27–29 2014 Judo Grand Prix at Jeju City (final)
    - Host nation, South Korea, and France won 6 gold medals each. South Korea won the overall medal tally.
- March 8 – May 18: 2014 EJU Cadets Series
  - March 8 & 9: 2014 EJU Cadets #1 in (Croatia) Zagreb
    - Germany won both the gold and overall medal tallies.
  - March 17–19: 2014 EJU Cadets #2 in (Turkey) Antalya
    - Russia won both the gold and overall medal tallies.
  - March 29 & 30: 2014 EJU Cadets #3 in (Ukraine) Kyiv
    - Status: Cancelled, due to the annexation of Crimea by the Russian Federation.
  - April 5 & 6: 2014 EJU Cadets #4 in Tver
    - Host nation, Russia, won both the gold and overall medal tallies.
  - April 12 & 13: 2014 EJU Cadets #5 in (Portugal) Coimbra
    - Germany won both the gold and overall medal tallies.
  - April 26 & 27: 2014 EJU Cadets #6 in (Romania) Pitești
    - Turkey won both the gold and overall medal tallies.
  - May 3 & 4: 2014 EJU Cadets #7 in (Germany) Berlin
    - Russia won both the gold and overall medal tallies.
  - May 10 & 11: 2014 EJU Cadets #8 in (Czech Republic) Teplice
    - Russia won both the gold and overall medal tallies.
  - May 17 & 18: 2014 EJU Cadets #9 (final) in (Poland) Bielsko-Biała
    - Georgia and Russia won 4 gold medals each. However, Russia won the overall medal tally.
- March 15 – August 3: 2014 EJU Juniors Series
  - March 15 & 16: 2014 EJU Juniors #1 in (Portugal) Coimbra
    - Netherlands won both the gold and overall medal tallies.
  - April 5 & 6: 2014 EJU Juniors #2 in (Greece) Thessaloniki
    - Georgia won both the gold and overall medal tallies.
  - April 19 & 20: 2014 EJU Juniors #3 in Saint Petersburg
    - Japan won the gold medal tally. Host nation, Russia, won the overall medal tally.
  - April 26 & 27: 2014 EJU Juniors #4 in Lignano
    - France and Israel won 3 gold medals each. However, host nation, Italy, won the overall medal tally.
  - May 10 & 11: 2014 EJU Juniors #5 in (Lithuania) Kaunas
    - Russia won both the gold and overall medal tallies.
  - May 17 & 18: 2014 EJU Juniors #6 in (Romania) Deva
    - Netherlands won both the gold and overall medal tallies.
  - May 24 & 25: 2014 EJU Juniors #7 in (Spain) A Coruña
    - Turkey won both the gold and overall medal tallies.
  - May 31 & June 1: 2014 EJU Juniors #8 in (Austria) Leibnitz
    - Russia won both the gold and overall medal tallies.
  - July 12 & 13: 2014 EJU Juniors #9 in (Hungary) Paks
    - Turkey and Ukraine won 3 gold medals each. Russia and Ukraine won 9 overall medals each.
  - July 19 & 20: 2014 EJU Juniors #10 in (Poland) Wrocław
    - Germany won both the gold and overall medal tallies.
  - July 26 & 27: 2014 EJU Juniors #11 in (Czech Republic) Prague
    - Brazil won the gold and overall medal tallies.
  - August 2 & 3: 2014 EJU Juniors #12 in (Germany) Berlin (final)
    - France won the gold medal tally. Russia won the overall medal tally.
- March 17 – August 2: 2014 Pan American Open
  - March 17 & 18: 2014 Pan American Open #1 in (Uruguay) Montevideo
    - Brazil won both the gold and overall medal tallies.
  - March 22 & 23: 2014 Pan American Open #2 in (Argentina) Buenos Aires
    - Brazil won both the gold and overall medal tallies.
  - June 14 & 15: 2014 Pan American Open #3 in (El Salvador) San Salvador
    - Canada won the gold medal tally. Brazil and Canada both won 11 overall medals each.
  - July 26 & 27: 2014 Pan American Open #4 in (Chile) Santiago
    - Brazil and Canada won 2 gold medals each. However, Brazil won the overall medal tally.
  - August 1 & 2: 2014 Pan American Open Final (#5) in Miami
    - Brazil and the United States won 4 gold medals each. However, the United States won the overall medal tally.
- March 29 - November 2: 2014 EJU Seniors Series
  - March 29 & 30: 2014 EJU Seniors #1 in (Bosnia and Herzegovina) Sarajevo
    - France won both the gold and overall medal tallies.
  - May 10 & 11: 2014 EJU Seniors #2 in (United Kingdom) London
    - Host nation, Great Britain, and France won 4 gold medals each. However, France won the overall medal tally.
  - May 17 & 18: 2014 EJU Seniors #3 in Orenburg
    - Host nation, Russia won both the gold and overall medal tallies.
  - June 14 & 15: 2014 EJU Seniors #4 in (Slovenia) Celje-Podčetrtek
    - Russia won both the gold and overall medal tallies.
  - July 12 & 13: 2014 EJU Seniors #5 in Sindelfingen
    - France won the gold medal tally. Host nation, Germany, won the overall medal tally.
  - September 6 & 7: 2014 EJU Seniors #6 in (Slovakia) Bratislava
    - Poland won both the gold and overall medal tallies.
  - September 20 & 21: 2014 EJU Seniors #7 in (Finland) Tampere
    - France won both the gold and overall medal tallies.
  - September 27 & 28: 2014 EJU Seniors #8 in Belgrade
    - Romania won the gold medal tally. Host nation, Serbia, won the overall medal tally.
  - October 25–29: 2014 EJU Seniors #9 in (Sweden) Helsingborg
    - France won both the gold and overall medal tallies.
  - November 1 & 2: 2014 EJU Seniors #10 (final) in Málaga
    - Germany and Russia won 4 gold medals each. Host nation, Spain, won the overall medal tally.
- June 21–29: 2014 PJC Cadets and Juniors Series
  - June 21 & 22: 2014 Pan American Judo C&D #1 in Panama City
    - Cadets: The Dominican Republic won the gold medal tally. Host nation, Panama, won the overall medal tally.
    - Juniors: Brazil won the gold medal tally. Mexico won the overall medal tally.
  - June 28 & 29: 2014 Pan American Judo C&D #2 in Irving, Texas (juniors only)
    - Mexico won the gold medal tally. The host, United States, won the overall medal tally.
- April 24–26: 2014 Pan American Judo Championships in (Ecuador) Guayaquil
  - Brazil won the gold medal tally. Cuba won the overall medal tally.
- April 24–27: 2014 European Judo Championships in Montpellier
  - Host nation, France, won both the gold and overall medal tallies.
- April 26 & 27: 2014 Oceania Judo Championships in Auckland
  - Men's Junior Cadets: Australia won both the gold and overall medal tallies.
  - Women's Junior Cadets: New Zealand won both the gold and overall medal tallies.
  - Men's Juniors: Australia won both the gold and overall medal tallies.
  - Women's Juniors: Australia won both the gold and overall medal tallies.
  - Men's Seniors: New Zealand won the gold medal tally. Australia won the overall medal tally.
  - Women's Seniors: Australia won the gold medal tally. Australia and New Zealand both won 8 overall medals each.
- June 26–29: 2014 AJU African Judo Championships in (Mauritius) Port Louis
  - Algeria and Tunisia won 5 gold medals each. However, Algeria won the overall medal tally.
- June 26–29: 2014 EJU European Veterans Championships in (Czech Republic) Prague
  - Russia won both the gold and overall medal tallies.
- July 4–6: 2014 EJU European Cadets Judo Championships in (Greece) Athens
  - Russia won both the gold and overall medal tallies.
- July 10–15: 2014 PJC Pan American Cadets & Juniors Judo Championships in (El Salvador) San Salvador
  - Cadets: Brazil won both the gold and overall medal tallies.
  - Juniors: Brazil won both the gold and overall medal tallies.
- July 27 & 28: 2014 JUA Asian Open in Chinese Taipei
  - China, Russia, and host Chinese Taipei won 3 gold medals each. However, Chinese Taipei won the overall medal tally.
- August 17–21: 2014 Summer Youth Olympics
  - Boys' 55 kg: (gold) (Kazakhstan) Bauyrzhan Zhauyntayev; (silver) (Azerbaijan) Natig Gurbanli; (bronze) #1 (Belgium) Jorre Verstraeten; (bronze) #2 (Turkey) Oguzhan Karaca
  - Boys' 66 kg: (gold) (Japan) Hifumi Abe; (silver) (Ukraine) Bogdan Iadov; (bronze) #1 (Uzbekistan) Sukhrob Tursunov; (bronze) #2 (China) WU Zhiqiang
  - Boys' 81 kg: (gold) (Russia) Mikhail Igolnikov; (silver) (Georgia (country)) Tamazi Kirakozashvili; (bronze) #1 (Netherlands) Frank de Wit; (bronze) #2 (Cuba) Ivan Felipe Silva Morales
  - Boys' 100 kg: (gold) (Iran) Ramin Safaviyeh; (silver) (Kyrgyzstan) Rostislav Dashkov; (bronze) (Germany) Domenik Schonefeldt
  - Girls' 44 kg: (gold) (Turkey) Melisa Cakmakli; (silver) (Azerbaijan) Leyla Aliyeva; (bronze) #1 (Russia) Anastasya Turcheva; (bronze) #2 (Japan) Honoka Yamauchi
  - Girls' 52 kg: (gold) (Brazil) Layana Colman; (silver) (Bulgaria) Betina Temelkova; (bronze) #1 (Slovenia) Marusa Stangar; (bronze) #2 (South Korea) LEE Hyekyeong
  - Girls' 63 kg: (gold) (Hungary) Szabina Gercsák; (silver) (Romania) Stefania Adelina Dobre; (bronze) #1 (Germany) Jennifer Schwille; (bronze) #2 (Austria) Michaela Polleres
  - Girls' 78 kg: (gold) (Croatia) Brigita Matic; (silver) (Bosnia and Herzegovina) Aleksandra Samardzic; (bronze) #1 (Spain) Sara Rodriguez; (bronze) #2 (Venezuela) Elvismar Rodriguez
  - Mixed Team: (gold) Team Rouge; (silver) Team Geesink; (bronze) #1 Team Douillet; (bronze) #2 Team Xian
- August 25–31: 2014 World Judo Championships in (Russia) Chelyabinsk
  - Japan won both the gold and overall medal tallies.
- September 20 & 21: 2014 European Junior Judo Championships in (Romania) Bucharest
  - Italy and Ukraine won 2 gold medals each. France won the overall medal tally.
- September 20–23: 2014 Asian Judo Championships in Incheon (part of the 2014 Asian Games)
  - Japan won the gold medal tally. Japan and hosts South Korea won 15 overall medals each.
- September 21 & 22: 2014 Kata World Championship in (Spain) Málaga
  - Juno Kata winners: (Germany) Wolfgang Dax-Romswinkel and Ulla Loosen
  - Katame no Kata winners: (Japan) Satoshi Nakayama and Seiji Hayashi
  - Nage no Kata winners: (Japan) Michito Sakamoto and Takayuki Yokoyama
  - Kime no Kata winners: (Japan) Kenji Takeishi and Koji Uematsu
  - Kodokan Goshin Jitsu winners: (Japan) Hideki Miyamoto and Masaki Watanabe
- September 25 – 27: 2014 Veterans Judo World Championship in (Spain) Málaga
  - M1 and M3: Click here.
  - M2, M4, and M5: Click here.
- October 22–26: 2014 IJF World Junior Championships in (United States) Fort Lauderdale, Florida
  - Japan won both the gold and overall medal tallies.
- November 14–16: 2014 OJU Oceania Open in (Australia) Wollongong
  - South Korea won the gold medal tally. Canada won the overall medal tally.
- December 12–14: 2014 JUA Asian Cadets and Junior Championships in Hong Kong
  - Cadets: Japan won the gold medal tally. Kazakhstan won the overall medal tally.
  - Juniors: Japan won the gold medal tally. Japan, South Korea, and Kazakhstan won ten overall medals each.

== Taekwondo ==
- February 8 – December 14: 2014 WTF Calendar of Events
  - February 8 & 9 at (Sweden) Trelleborg
    - Turkey won the gold medal tally. Germany won the overall medal tally.
  - February 11–16 at Luxor
    - Azerbaijan and Germany won 2 gold medals each. Host nation, Egypt, won the overall medal tally.
    - Note: During the Luxor 2014 competition, Turkish athlete, Seyithan Akbalik, died of a heart attack. He was only 21 years old. RIP.
  - February 13–16 at Montreal (Canadian Open)
    - Chinese Taipei won the gold medal tally. Host nation, Canada won the overall medal tally.
  - February 18–23 at (United States) Las Vegas (US Open)
    - Mexico won both the gold and overall medal tallies.
  - February 20–22 at (United Arab Emirates) Fujairah
    - France won both the gold and overall medal tallies.
  - February 24–26 at Tehran (Fajr International Open)
    - Host nation, Iran, won both the gold and overall medal tallies.
  - February 27 – March 1 at Manama (6th Bahrain Open)
    - France, Great Britain, and Jordan are tied, with 3 gold medals each. However, France won the overall medal tally.
  - March 15 & 16 at (Netherlands) Eindhoven
    - Great Britain and France won 2 gold medals each. However, France won the overall medal tally.
  - April 4–6 at (Dominican Republic) Santo Domingo
    - Mexico won both the gold and overall medal tallies.
  - April 11–13 at (Germany) Hamburg
    - Iran won the gold medal tally. Spain won the overall medal tally.
  - April 18–20 at Chișinău
    - France, Ukraine, and host nation, Moldova, won 3 gold medals each. However, Ukraine won the overall medal tally.
  - April 25–27 at Kos
    - Russia won the gold medal tally. Host nation, Greece, won the overall medal tally.
  - May 10 & 11 at Tunis (4th International Carthage Open)
    - Iran won the gold medal tally. Host nation, Tunisia, won the overall medal tally.
  - May 16–18 at Castellón de la Plana (Spanish Open)
    - Host nation, Spain, won both the gold and overall medal tallies.
  - May 31 & June 1 at (Austria) Innsbruck (Austrian Open)
    - Croatia won the gold medal tally. Croatia and Turkey won 9 overall medals each.
  - June 7 & 8 at (Switzerland) Lausanne (Swiss Open)
    - France won both the gold and overall medal tallies.
  - June 20–22 at Santa Cruz de la Sierra (Bolivia Open)
    - Brazil won both the gold and overall medal tallies.
  - July 11–16 at Gyeongju
    - Host nation, South Korea, won both the gold and overall medal tallies in all the senior and junior events contested.
  - August 7–10 at Bogotá (Open de Las Americas) (debut event)
    - Mexico won the gold medal tally. Host nation, Colombia, won the overall medal tally.
  - August 16 & 17 at Sydney (5th Australian Open)
    - South Korea won the gold medal tally. Host nation, Australia, won the overall medal tally.
  - August 22–24 at Buenos Aires (Argentina Open)
    - Mexico won the gold medal tally. Brazil won the overall medal tally.
  - August 29–31 at San José (Costa Rica Open)
    - Mexico won both the gold and overall medal tallies.
  - September 11–15 at Aguascalientes (Mexico Open)
    - Host nation, Mexico, and the United States won 6 gold medals each. However, Mexico won the overall medal tally.
  - September 12–14 at Moscow (Russian Open)
    - Host nation, Russia, won both the gold and overall medal tallies.
  - September 14 & 15 at Ramla (Israel Open)
    - Croatia, Cyprus, and France won 2 gold medals each. Host nation, Israel, won the overall medal tally.
  - October 3 – 5 at Kharkiv
    - Note: This event has been canceled because of the ongoing 2014 pro-Russian unrest in Ukraine.
  - October 18 & 19 at Belgrade (Serbia Open)
    - Croatia won the gold medal tally. Russia won the overall medal tally.
  - November 5–7 at Bangkok (Thailand Open)
    - Host nation, Thailand, won both the gold and overall medal tallies.
  - November 15 & 16 at Zagreb (Croatia Open)
    - Host nation, Croatia, won both the gold and overall medal tallies.
  - November 28–30 at Belek (Turkish Open)
    - Seniors: Host nation, Turkey, and Great Britain won 3 gold medals each. Turkey won the overall medal tally.
    - Juniors: Turkey won both the gold and overall medal tallies.
    - Cadets: Iran won the gold medal tally. Turkey won the overall medal tally.
  - December 12–14 at Portland, Oregon (Pan American Open) (final)
    - The United States won the gold and overall medal tallies.
- July 4 – December 4: 2014 WTF Grand Prix
  - July 4–6 at Suzhou
    - Host nation, China, and South Korea won 2 gold medals each. However, South Korea won the overall medal tally.
  - August 29–31 at (Kazakhstan) Astana
    - Eight different teams won one gold medal each. Six different team won three overall medals each.
  - October 24–26 at (United Kingdom) Manchester
    - Spain and Iran won 2 gold medals each. Iran won the overall medal tally.
  - December 3 & 4 at (Mexico) Querétaro (final GP)
    - Russia won the gold medal tally. Iran won the overall medal tally.
- March 23 – 26: 2014 WTF World Junior Taekwondo Championships in (Chinese Taipei) Taipei
  - South Korea won both the gold and overall medal tallies.
- May 1–5: 2014 European Taekwondo Championships in (Azerbaijan) Baku
  - Croatia won the gold medal tally. France won the overall medal tally.
- May 6–8: 2014 African Taekwondo Championships in (Tunisia) Tunis
  - Egypt won the gold medal tally. Ivory Coast won the overall medal tally.
- May 25–28: 2014 Asian Taekwondo and Taekwondo Poomsae Championships together in (Uzbekistan) Tashkent
  - Iran and South Korea won 5 gold medals each. Iran won the overall medal tally, in combination of the two championships here.
- July 24–27: 2014 WTF World Cadet Taekwondo Championships in (Azerbaijan) Baku (debut event)
  - Iran won the gold medal tally. Iran and Russia won 6 overall medals each.
- August 14 & 15: 2014 Oceania Taekwondo Championships in (Australia) Sydney
  - For both the junior and cadets results, click here.
  - For the seniors results, click here.
- August 14–22: 2014 World Military Taekwondo Championship in Tehran
  - Men: Iran won the gold medal tally. Brazil and Iran won 5 overall medals each.
  - Women: Iran and China won 4 gold medals each. Iran won the overall medal tally.
- August 17–21: 2014 Summer Youth Olympics
  - Chinese Taipei and Iran won 2 gold medals each. Host nation, China, and Chinese Taipei won 4 overall medals each.
- October 30 – November 2: 2014 WTF World Taekwondo Poomsae Championships in (Mexico) Aguascalientes
  - South Korea won the gold medal tally. The United States won the overall medal tally.
- December 6 & 7: 2014 World Cup Taekwondo Team Championships in Querétaro
  - Men's Team Champions: Russia; Second: Mexico; Third: Iran and South Korea
  - Women's Team Champions: South Korea; Second: Ivory Coast; Third: China and France

== Wrestling ==
- January 11 – December 7: 2014 FILA Olympic Wrestling Calendar
- January 24–26: First Golden Grand Prix in Krasnoyarsk
  - Host nation, Russia, won both the gold and overall medal tallies.
- February 8 & 9: Second Golden Grand Prix in (France) Paris
  - Georgia won the gold medal tally. United States won the overall medal tally.
- March 1 & 2: Third Golden Grand Prix (Greco-Roman only) in (Hungary) Szombathely
  - Iran won both the gold and overall medal tallies.
- March 15 & 16: Men's Freestyle World Cup in Los Angeles
  - Champions: Iran; Second: Russia; Third: United States.
- March 15 & 16: Women's Freestyle World Cup in Tokyo
  - Champions: Japan; Second: Russia; Third: China.
- March 19–22: 2014 Oceania Wrestling Championships in Pago Pago
  - Cadet Men's Freestyle: New Zealand won the gold medal tally. American Samoa won the overall medal tally.
  - Cadet Women's Freestyle: Marshall Islands and New Zealand won 1 gold medal each. American Samoa won the overall medal tally.
  - Cadet Greco-Roman: New Zealand won the gold medal tally. American Samoa won the overall medal tally.
  - Junior Men's Freestyle: Australia and New Zealand won 3 gold medals each. American Samoa won the overall medal tally.
  - Junior Women's Freestyle: New Zealand won the gold medal tally. American Samoa won the overall medal tally.
  - Junior Greco-Roman: New Zealand won the gold medal tally. American Samoa won the overall medal tally.
  - Senior Men's Freestyle: New Zealand won both the gold and overall medal tallies.
  - Senior Women's Freestyle not contested, due to having only 3 female wrestler participants that bothered to attend this event.
  - Senior Greco-Roman: American Samoa and New Zealand won 2 gold medals each. However, American Samoa won the overall medal tally.
  - Youth Olympic Games Qualifiers for Men's Freestyle: New Zealand won the gold medal tally. American Samoa won the overall medal tally.
  - Youth Olympic Games Qualifiers for Women's Freestyle: Guam and the Marshall Islands won 1 gold medal each. American Samoa won the overall medal tally.
  - Youth Olympic Games Qualifiers for Greco-Roman: New Zealand won the gold medal tally. American Samoa won the overall medal tally.
  - Overall Beach Wrestling: American Samoa and New Zealand won 3 gold medals each. However, American Samoa won the overall medal tally.
- March 28–30: 2014 African Wrestling Championships in Tunis
  - Greco-Roman: Host nation, Tunisia, and Egypt tied with 3 gold medals each. Tunisia won the overall medal and team titles.
  - Women's Freestyle: Host nation, Tunisia, won the gold medal tally. Cameroon and Nigeria tied, with 6 overall medals each. Nigeria took the team title.
  - Men's Freestyle: Egypt and Nigeria both won 2 gold medals each. Host nation, Tunisia, won the overall medal and team titles.
- April 1–6: 2014 European Wrestling Championships in (Finland) Vantaa
  - Russia won both the gold and overall medal tallies.
- April 2–7: 2014 FILA Central America and Caribbean Championships in (Puerto Rico) San Juan
  - Cuba won both the gold and overall medal tallies.
- April 23–27: 2014 Asian Wrestling Championships in Astana
  - Iran won the gold medal tally. Host nation, Kazakhstan, won the overall medal tally.
- May 2–4: 2014 Pan-American Cadet and YOG Qualification Wrestling Championships in (Brazil) Recife
  - Cadet Men's Freestyle: United States won the gold medal tally. Venezuela won the overall medal tally.
  - Cadet Women's Freestyle: United States won the gold medal tally. Venezuela won the overall medal tally.
  - Cadet Greco-Roman: United States won both the gold and overall medal tallies.
- May 6–11: 2014 European Cadet and YOG Qualification Wrestling Championship in (Bulgaria) Samokov
  - Cadet Men's Freestyle: Russia won both the gold and overall medal tallies.
  - Cadet Women's Freestyle: Ukraine won the gold medal tally. Russia won the overall medal tally.
  - Cadet Greco-Roman: Azerbaijan, Georgia, and Russia won 2 gold medals each. However, Russia won the overall medal tally.
- May 8–11: 2014 Asian Cadet and YOG Qualification Wrestling Championships in (Thailand) Bangkok
  - Cadet Men's Freestyle: India won the gold medal tally. India and Iran both won 8 overall medals each.
  - Cadet Women's Freestyle: Japan and North Korea won 3 gold medals each. However, Japan won the overall medal tally.
  - Cadet Greco-Roman: Iran won both the gold and overall medal tallies.
- May 15 & 16: 2014 FILA Greco-Roman Wrestling World Cup in Tehran
  - Host nation, Iran, won first place overall, with five wins.
- May 19 & 20: 2014 African Cadet and YOG Qualification Wrestling Championships in Alexandria
  - Cadet Men's Freestyle: Host nation, Egypt, won the gold medal tally. South Africa won the overall medal tally.
  - Cadet Women's Freestyle: Host nation, Egypt, won both the gold and overall medal tallies.
  - Cadet Greco-Roman: A clean sweep of all the gold medals by the host nation Egypt. Egypt also won the overall medal tally.
- May 22 & 23: 2014 African Junior Wrestling Championships in Alexandria
  - Junior Men's Freestyle: Egypt won the gold medal tally. Algeria and Egypt won 7 overall medals each.
  - Junior Women's Freestyle: Egypt and Tunisia won 2 gold medals each. Egypt won the overall medal tally.
  - Junior Greco-Roman: Egypt won both the gold and overall medal tallies.
- June 5–8: 2014 Asian Junior Wrestling Championships in Ulaanbaatar
  - Junior Men's Freestyle: Iran won both the gold and overall medal tallies.
  - Junior Women's Freestyle: Japan won the gold medal tally. Host nation, Mongolia, won the overall medal tally.
  - Junior Greco-Roman: Iran won both the gold and overall medal tallies.
- June 17–22: 2014 European Junior Wrestling Championships in (Poland) Katowice
  - Junior Men's Freestyle: Georgia won the gold medal tally. Turkey won the overall medal tally.
  - Junior Women's Freestyle: Russia won both the gold and overall medal tallies.
  - Junior Greco-Roman: Azerbaijan won the gold medal tally. Russia won the overall medal tally.
- June 27–29: 2014 Pan American Junior Wrestling Championships in Toronto
  - Junior Men's Freestyle: The United States won the gold medal tally. Host nation, Canada, won the overall medal tally.
  - Junior Women's Freestyle: Host nation, Canada, won the gold medal tally. Canada and the United States won 7 overall medals each.
  - Junior Greco-Roman: The United States won the gold medal tally. Host nation, Canada, and the United States won 5 overall medals each.
    - Note: The Greco-Roman 50 kg event was not contested, due to having just one judoka here.
- July 4–6: 2014 World Beach Wrestling Championships in Katerini, Pieria
  - Men's Senior: Romania and Russia won 2 gold medals each. Host nation, Greece, won the overall medal tally.
  - Women Senior: Greece won both the gold and overall medal tallies.
  - Men's Junior: Greece won both the gold and overall medal tallies.
  - Women's Junior: Greece and Norway won 1 gold medal each. Greece won the overall medal tally.
  - Men's Cadet: Greece won both the gold and overall medal tallies.
  - Women's Cadet: Sweden won the gold medal; Norway took the silver and bronze medal in the +50 kg event.
    - Note: The 50 kg women's cadet event was not contested, due to having only one Greek wrestler in this category.
- July 15–17: 2014 Pan American Wrestling Championships in Mexico City
  - Men's Freestyle: The United States won both the gold and overall medal tallies.
  - Women's Freestyle: Ecuador won the gold medal tally. Canada won the overall medal tally.
  - Greco-Roman: Cuba won the gold medal tally. The United States won the overall medal tally.
- July 15–20: 2014 FILA Cadet World Wrestling Championships in (Slovakia) Snina
  - Men's Freestyle: The United States won the gold medal tally. Iran and Russia won 7 overall medals each.
  - Women's Freestyle: Japan won both the gold and overall medal tallies.
  - Greco-Roman: Russia won the gold medal tally. Azerbaijan and Iran won 5 overall medals each.
- July 24–27: Final Golden Grand Prix in Baku
  - Men's Freestyle: Host nation, Azerbaijan, won both the gold and overall medal tallies.
  - Women's Freestyle: Host nation, Azerbaijan, and Japan won 2 gold medals each. However, Japan won the overall medal tally.
  - Greco-Roman: Host nation, Azerbaijan, won both the gold and overall medal tallies.
- August 5–10: 2014 Junior World Wrestling Championships in (Croatia) Zagreb
  - Men's Freestyle: Iran and Russia won 3 gold medals each. Iran and the United States won 6 overall medals each.
  - Women's Freestyle: Japan won both the gold and overall medal tallies.
  - Greco-Roman: Azerbaijan won both the gold and overall medal tallies.
- August 25–27: 2014 Summer Youth Olympics
  - Russia won the gold medal tally. Azerbaijan won the overall medal tally.
- August 26–31: 2014 FILA Veteran World Championships in (Serbia) Belgrade
  - Men's Freestyle: Russia won both the gold and overall medal tallies.
  - Greco-Roman: Russia won both the gold and overall medal tallies.
    - Note: There was only one Russian wrestler in the Greco-Roman 58 kg Group G category.
- September 8–14: 2014 World Wrestling Championships in (Uzbekistan) Tashkent
  - Russia won both the gold and overall medal tallies.
  - Men's Freestyle overall team winner: Russia
  - Greco-Roman overall team winner: Iran
  - Women's Freestyle overall team winner: Japan
