= Judo at the 2016 Summer Olympics – Men's 66 kg =

Men's 66 kg at the Games of the XXXI Olympiad
- Venue: Carioca Arena 2
- Date: 7 August 2016
- Competitors: 34 from 34 nations

Medalists
1st place, gold medalist(s)		Fabio Basile	Italy
2nd place, silver medalist(s)		An Ba-ul	South Korea
3rd place, bronze medalist(s)		Rishod Sobirov	Uzbekistan
3rd place, bronze medalist(s)		Masashi Ebinuma	Japan

The men's 66 kg competition in judo at the 2016 Summer Olympics in Rio de Janeiro was held on 7 August at the Carioca Arena 2.

The gold and silver medals were determined by a single-elimination tournament, with the winner of the final taking gold and the loser receiving silver. Judo events awarded two bronze medals. Quarterfinal losers competed in a repechage match for the right to face a semifinal loser for a bronze medal (that is, the judokas defeated in quarterfinals A and B competed against each other, with the winner of that match facing the semifinal loser from the other half of the bracket).

The medals for the competition were presented by Beatrice Allen, a Gambian member of the International Olympic Committee, and the gifts were presented by Yasuhiro Yamashita, International Judo Federation executive committee member.

== Results ==
=== Finals ===
Semi-finals
An Ba-ul (KOR)	001
Masashi Ebinuma (JPN)	000
Fabio Basile (ITA)	000
Adrian Gomboc (SLO)	000

Final
An Ba-ul (KOR)	000
Fabio Basile (ITA)	100

=== Repechages ===
Repechage		Bronze medal
Rishod Sobirov (UZB)	100
Wander Mateo (DOM)	000	Rishod Sobirov (UZB)	110
		Adrian Gomboc (SLO)	000

Repechage		Bronze medal
Davaadorjiin Tömörkhüleg (MGL)	000
Antoine Bouchard (CAN)	010	Antoine Bouchard (CAN)	000
		Masashi Ebinuma (JPN)	101

=== Pool A ===
First round
Jasper Lefevere (BEL)	000
Zhansay Smagulov (KAZ)	000

Second round
An Ba-ul (KOR)	110
Zhansay Smagulov (KAZ)	000
Kilian Le Blouch (FRA)	000
Colin Oates (GBR)	000
Rishod Sobirov (UZB)	001
Dzmitry Shershan (BLR)	000
Joe Mahit (VAN)	000
Jayme Mata (ARU)	100

Third round
An Ba-ul (KOR)	110
Kilian Le Blouch (FRA)	000
Rishod Sobirov (UZB)	100
Jayme Mata (ARU)	000

Quarterfinals
An Ba-ul (KOR)	010
Rishod Sobirov (UZB)	000

=== Pool B ===
First round

Second round
Georgii Zantaraia (UKR)	000
Sergiu Oleinic (POR)	001
Wander Mateo (DOM)	010
Rodrick Kuku (COD)	000
Masashi Ebinuma (JPN)	101
Charles Chibana (BRA)	000
Anass Houssein (DJI)	000
Ma Duanbin (CHN)	110

Third round
Sergiu Oleinic (POR)	000
Wander Mateo (DOM)	100
Masashi Ebinuma (JPN)	111
Ma Duanbin (CHN)	000

Quarterfinals
Wander Mateo (DOM)	000
Masashi Ebinuma (JPN)	111

=== Pool C ===
First round

Second round
Davaadorjiin Tömörkhüleg (MGL)	100
Sulaiman Hamad (KSA)	000
Yigal Kopinsky (SUR)	000
Houd Zourdani (ALG)	100
Nijat Shikhalizade (AZE)	001
Sugoi Uriarte (ESP)	000
Sebastian Seidl (GER)	000
Fabio Basile (ITA)	100

Third round
Davaadorjiin Tömörkhüleg (MGL)	101
Houd Zourdani (ALG)	000
Nijat Shikhalizade (AZE)	000
Fabio Basile (ITA)	110

Quarterfinals
Davaadorjiin Tömörkhüleg (MGL)	000
Fabio Basile (ITA)	100

=== Pool D ===
First round
Antoine Bouchard (CAN)	100
Raymond Ovinou (PNG)	000

Second round
Mikhail Pulyaev (RUS)	000
Antoine Bouchard (CAN)	001
Imad Bassou (MAR)	001
Nathan Katz (AUS)	000
Golan Pollack (ISR)	000
Mathews Punza (ZAM)	100
Adrian Gomboc (SLO)	100
Vazha Margvelashvili (GEO)	000

Third round
Antoine Bouchard (CAN)	001
Imad Bassou (MAR)	000
Mathews Punza (ZAM)	000
Adrian Gomboc (SLO)	101

Quarterfinals
Antoine Bouchard (CAN)	000
Adrian Gomboc (SLO)	100
