= Judo at the 2015 European Games – Men's 66 kg =

Judo competition

Judo Men's 66 kg at the 2015 European Games
- Venue: Heydar Aliyev Arena
- Location: Baku, Azerbaijan
- Date: 25 June
- Competitors: 32 from 21 nations

Medalists
gold medal	Kamal Khan-Magomedov (1st title)	Russia
silver medal	Loïc Korval	France
bronze medal	Mikhail Pulyaev	Russia
bronze medal	Sebastian Seidl	Germany

Competition at external databases
- Links: IJF • JudoInside

The men's 66 kg judo event at the 2015 European Games in Baku was held on 25 June at the Heydar Aliyev Arena.

== Results ==
=== Final ===
Final
Kamal Khan-Magomedov (RUS)	010
Loïc Korval (FRA)	001

=== Repechage ===
Repechage
Georgii Zantaraia (UKR)	010
Nijat Shikhalizada (AZE)	100

Third place
Nijat Shikhalizada (AZE)	000
Mikhail Pulyaev (RUS)	010

Repechage
Sebastian Seidl (GER)	100
Dzmitry Shershan (BLR)	000

Third place
Sebastian Seidl (GER)	012
Sergiu Oleinic (POR)	000

=== Top half ===
Round of 32
Georgii Zantaraia (UKR)	100
Adrian Gomboc (SLO)	000
David Ramírez (ESP)	000
David Larose (FRA)	100
Kamal Khan-Magomedov (RUS)	100
Marko Vukićević (SRB)	000
Felicián Őri (HUN)	001
Baruch Shmailov (ISR)	100
Colin Oates (GBR)	001
Kenneth Van Gansbeke (BEL)	000
Sergiu Oleinic (POR)	100
Andreas Krassas (CYP)	000
Nijat Shikhalizada (AZE)	100
Sinan Sandal (TUR)	000
Artiom Nacu (MDA)	000
Elio Verde (ITA)	110

Round of 16
Georgii Zantaraia (UKR)	000
David Larose (FRA)	000
Kamal Khan-Magomedov (RUS)	100
Baruch Shmailov (ISR)	000
Colin Oates (GBR)	000
Sergiu Oleinic (POR)	001
Nijat Shikhalizada (AZE)	110
Elio Verde (ITA)	000

Quarterfinals
Georgii Zantaraia (UKR)	000
Kamal Khan-Magomedov (RUS)	100
Sergiu Oleinic (POR)	100
Nijat Shikhalizada (AZE)	000

Semifinals
Kamal Khan-Magomedov (RUS)	100
Sergiu Oleinic (POR)	000

=== Bottom half ===
Round of 32
Mikhail Pulyaev (RUS)	010
Tarlan Karimov (AZE)	000
Emanuele Bruno (ITA)	000
Diogo César (POR)	100
Sebastian Seidl (GER)	101
Bence Zámbori (HUN)	000
Remus Lazea (ROU)	000
Jasper Lefevere (BEL)	000
Dzmitry Shershan (BLR)	101
Ilija Ciganović (SRB)	000
Sugoi Uriarte (ESP)	100
Iljas Avir (EST)	000
Loïc Korval (FRA)	001
Aleksander Beta (POL)	000
Golan Pollack (ISR)	010
Andraž Jereb (SLO)	001

Round of 16
Mikhail Pulyaev (RUS)	100
Diogo César (POR)	000
Sebastian Seidl (GER)	100
Jasper Lefevere (BEL)	000
Dzmitry Shershan (BLR)	010
Sugoi Uriarte (ESP)	000
Loïc Korval (FRA)	001
Golan Pollack (ISR)	000

Quarterfinals
Mikhail Pulyaev (RUS)	100
Sebastian Seidl (GER)	000
Dzmitry Shershan (BLR)	000
Loïc Korval (FRA)	100

Semifinals
Mikhail Pulyaev (RUS)	000
Loïc Korval (FRA)	010
