= Mikhail Pulyaev =

Russian judoka (born 1987)

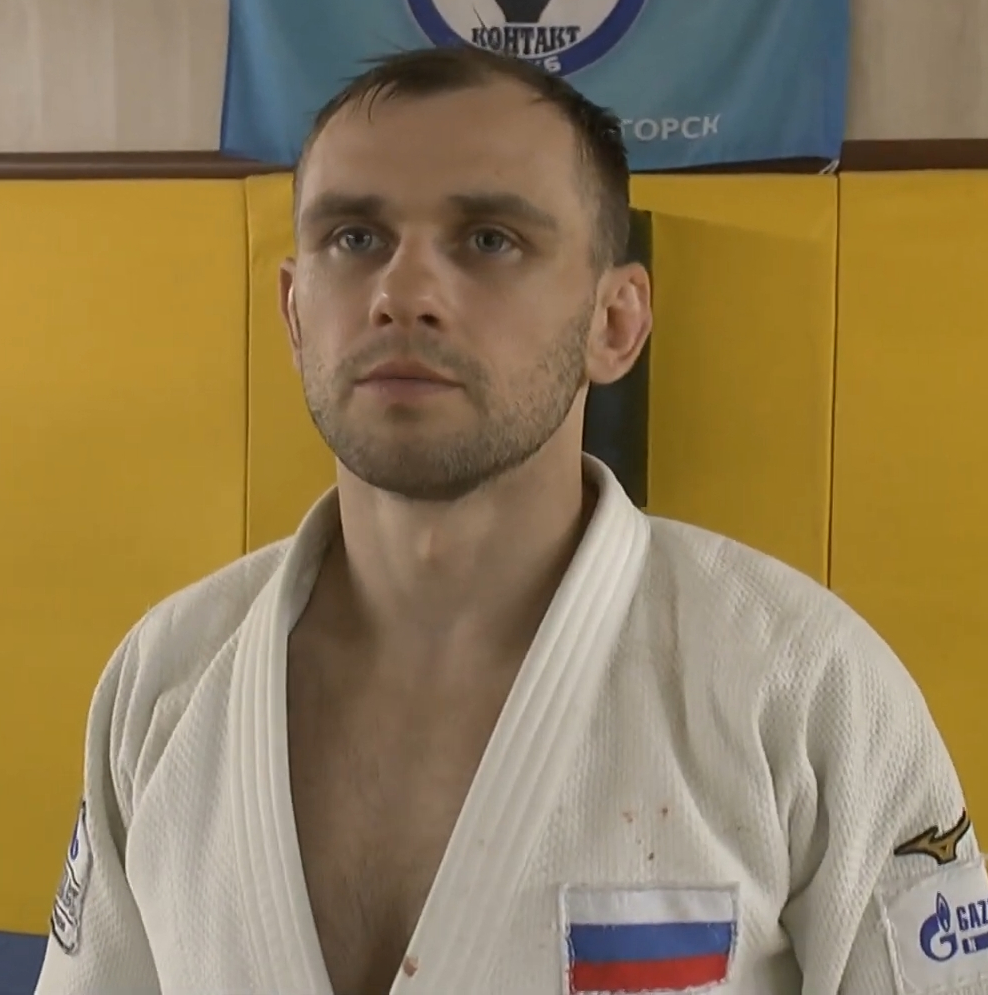
- Mikhail Pulyaev in May 2021

Personal information
- Born: 22 June 1987 (age 39) Podolsk, USSR
- Occupation: Judoka

Sport
- Country: Russia
- Sport: Judo
- Weight class: –66 kg

Achievements and titles
- Olympic Games: R32 (2016)
- World Champ.: (silver) (2014, 2015, 2017)
- European Champ.: (bronze) (2014, 2015)
Medal record
Men's judo
Representing Russia
World Championships
Silver medal – second place	2014 Chelyabinsk	‍–‍66 kg
Silver medal – second place	2015 Astana	‍–‍66 kg
Silver medal – second place	2017 Budapest	‍–‍66 kg
European Games
Bronze medal – third place	2015 Baku	‍–‍66 kg
Bronze medal – third place	2015 Baku	Men's team
European Championships
Silver medal – second place	2009 Miskolc	Men's team
Silver medal – second place	2013 Budapest	Men's team
Bronze medal – third place	2014 Montpellier	‍–‍66 kg
IJF Grand Slam
Gold medal – first place	2014 Paris	‍–‍66 kg
Gold medal – first place	2016 Baku	‍–‍66 kg
Bronze medal – third place	2012 Tokyo	‍–‍66 kg
Bronze medal – third place	2014 Tokyo	‍–‍66 kg
Bronze medal – third place	2016 Tokyo	‍–‍66 kg
Bronze medal – third place	2021 Tbilisi	‍–‍66 kg
IJF Grand Prix
Gold medal – first place	2010 Rotterdam	‍–‍66 kg
Gold medal – first place	2013 Abu Dhabi	‍–‍66 kg
Gold medal – first place	2014 Havana	‍–‍66 kg
Gold medal – first place	2015 Jeju	‍–‍66 kg
Silver medal – second place	2012 Baku	‍–‍66 kg
Silver medal – second place	2018 Hohhot	‍–‍66 kg
Silver medal – second place	2018 Cancún	‍–‍66 kg
Silver medal – second place	2019 Antalya	‍–‍66 kg
Bronze medal – third place	2011 Düsseldorf	‍–‍66 kg
Bronze medal – third place	2011 Baku	‍–‍66 kg
Bronze medal – third place	2016 Düsseldorf	‍–‍66 kg
Bronze medal – third place	2019 Budapest	‍–‍66 kg

Profile at external databases
- IJF: 2345
- JudoInside.com: 33828
- Updated on 26 June 2023

Mikhail Sergeyevich Pulyaev (Russian: Михаил Сергеевич Пуляев; born 22 June 1987) is a Russian judoka.

== Personal life ==
Pulyaev is married and graduated from the University of the Interior Ministry branch in Ryazan. He is a member of the Ryazan police force department.

== Career ==
Pulyaev won bronze in 66 kg at the 2014 European Judo Championships. He was defeated by Japanese Olympic bronze medalist Masashi Ebinuma at the 2014 World Championships in Chelyabinsk and settled for the silver medal.

Pulyaev took bronze in 66 kg at the inaugural 2015 European Games in the finals held in Baku, Azerbaijan.
