= Golan Pollack =

Israeli judoka (born 1991)

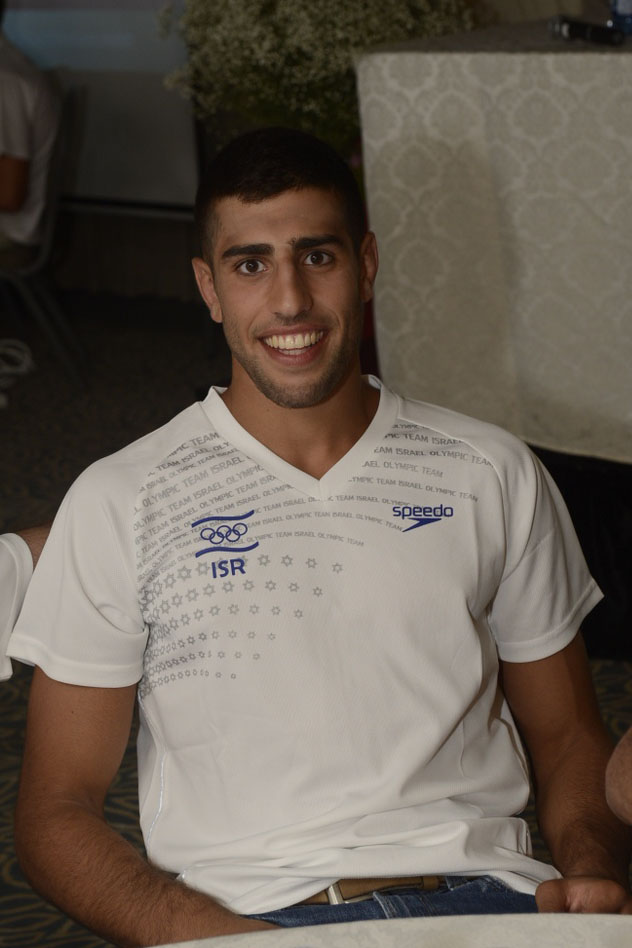

Personal information
- Native name: גולן פולק
- Nationality: Israeli
- Born: September 10, 1991 (age 34) Yehud, Israel
- Occupation: Judo coach
- Height: 175 cm (5 ft 9 in)

Sport
- Country: Israel
- Sport: Judo
- Weight class: –66 kg
- Rank: 4th dan black belt

Achievements and titles
- Olympic Games: R32 (2016)
- World Champ.: (bronze) (2015)
- European Champ.: R16 (2012, 2013, 2015)
Medal record
Men's judo
Representing Israel
World Championships
Bronze medal – third place	2015 Astana	‍–‍66 kg
World Masters
Bronze medal – third place	2013 Tyumen	‍–‍66 kg
Bronze medal – third place	2016 Guadalajara	‍–‍66 kg
IJF Grand Slam
Silver medal – second place	2014 Tokyo	‍–‍66 kg
Bronze medal – third place	2014 Baku	‍–‍66 kg
IJF Grand Prix
Silver medal – second place	2013 Samsun	‍–‍66 kg
Silver medal – second place	2016 Düsseldorf	‍–‍66 kg
Bronze medal – third place	2013 Düsseldorf	‍–‍66 kg
Bronze medal – third place	2013 Ulaanbaatar	‍–‍66 kg
Bronze medal – third place	2015 Zagreb	‍–‍66 kg
Bronze medal – third place	2015 Jeju	‍–‍66 kg
Maccabiah Games
Gold medal – first place	2009 Tel Aviv	‍–‍66 kg
European Youth Olympic Festival
Bronze medal – third place	2007 Belgrade	‍–‍60 kg

Profile at external databases
- IJF: 1433
- JudoInside.com: 42912
- Updated on 4 May 2025

Golan Pollack (Hebrew: גולן פולק; born 10 September 1991 in Yehud, Israel) is an Israeli Olympic judoka. who competed in the half lightweight (under 66 kg) weight category.

Pollack won a bronze medal in the 2015 World Championships and represented Israel at the 2016 Summer Olympics. He is 1.75 m (5 ft 9 in) tall, and weighs 66 kg (146 lb)

== Judo career ==
Pollack won a gold medal at the 2009 Maccabiah Games in the 66 kg division.

At the 2011 World Championships, Pollack reached the quarterfinals, where he was defeated by Miklós Ungvári of Hungary. At the 2012 Summer Olympics, Pollak lost in the first round to David Larose of France.

Pollack won the European Open in Sofia in 2014. On 5 December, Pollack won a silver medal at the 2014 Tokyo Grand Slam.

On 25 August, Pollack won a bronze medal at the 2015 World Championships in Astana, Kazakhstan after defeating Davaadorjiin Tömörkhüleg of Mongolia. During that day he also beat Georgii Zantaraia of Ukraine, ranked number one in the world. He became the sixth Israeli to win a medal at the World Judo Championships, joining Yael Arad (1991, bronze; 1993, silver), Oren Smadja (1995, silver), Ariel Ze'evi (2001, silver), Alice Schlesinger (2009, bronze), and Yarden Gerbi (2013, gold; 2014, silver).

Pollack won a silver medal at the 2016 Düsseldorf Grand Prix, losing in the final to world champion An Ba-ul of Korea.

Pollack represented Israel at the 2016 Summer Olympics in judo, competing in the men's 66 kg event where he was ranked 6th. After receiving a first-round bye, he was eliminated by Zambia's Mathews Punza. His coach, former Olympic medalist Oren Smadja, said: “Golan used a move he shouldn’t have used and doesn’t usually use. The move doesn’t even have a name. It’s a move where you try to surprise your opponent by falling on your back on the mat, but it risks a lock, which is exactly what happened to Golan. Golan lost to himself, and his opponent got a gift." Pollack left the match in tears, and collapsed to his knees, hiding his face. He said: “I’m very disappointed, especially after all the long way I’ve come in the last four years.... I thank everyone for their support, and I’m sorry I’ve disappointed you.”

== Medals ==
Year	Tournament	Place	Ref.
2013	Grand Prix Düsseldorf	3rd place, bronze medalist(s)	
2013	Grand Prix Samsun	2nd place, silver medalist(s)	
2013	World Masters	3rd place, bronze medalist(s)	
2013	Grand Prix Ulaanbaatar	3rd place, bronze medalist(s)	
2014	Grand Slam Baku	3rd place, bronze medalist(s)	
2014	Grand Slam Tokyo	2nd place, silver medalist(s)	
2015	Grand Prix Zagreb	3rd place, bronze medalist(s)	
2015	World Championships	3rd place, bronze medalist(s)	
2015	Grand Prix Jeju	3rd place, bronze medalist(s)	
2016	Grand Prix Düsseldorf	2nd place, silver medalist(s)	
2016	World Masters	3rd place, bronze medalist(s)	
