= 2013 Judo Grand Prix Samsun =

Judo competition

Judo 2013 Judo Grand Prix Samsun
- Location: Samsun, Turkey
- Dates: 30–31 March 2013
- Competitors: 318 from 40 nations

Competition at external databases
- Links: IJF • JudoInside

The 2013 Judo Grand Prix Samsun was held in Samsun, Turkey from 30 to 31 March 2013.

== Medal summary ==
=== Men's events ===
Event	Gold	Silver	Bronze
Extra-lightweight (−60 kg)	Dashdavaagiin Amartüvshin (MGL)	Yeldos Smetov (KAZ)	Robert Mshvidobadze (RUS)
Extra-lightweight (−60 kg)	Dashdavaagiin Amartüvshin (MGL)	Yeldos Smetov (KAZ)	Vugar Shirinli (AZE)
Half-lightweight (−66 kg)	Georgii Zantaraia (UKR)	Golan Pollack (ISR)	Dimitri Dragin (FRA)
Half-lightweight (−66 kg)	Georgii Zantaraia (UKR)	Golan Pollack (ISR)	Kamal Khan-Magomedov (RUS)
Lightweight (−73 kg)	Musa Mogushkov (RUS)	Sainjargalyn Nyam-Ochir (MGL)	Ugo Legrand (FRA)
Lightweight (−73 kg)	Musa Mogushkov (RUS)	Sainjargalyn Nyam-Ochir (MGL)	Zebeda Rekhviashvili (GEO)
Half-middleweight (−81 kg)	Loïc Pietri (FRA)	Vitalii Dudchyk (UKR)	Jaromír Ježek (CZE)
Half-middleweight (−81 kg)	Loïc Pietri (FRA)	Vitalii Dudchyk (UKR)	Ivan Vorobev (RUS)
Middleweight (−90 kg)	Kirill Denisov (RUS)	Guillaume Elmont (NED)	Mohamed Darwish (EGY)
Middleweight (−90 kg)	Kirill Denisov (RUS)	Guillaume Elmont (NED)	Alexandr Jurečka (CZE)
Half-heavyweight (−100 kg)	Adlan Bisultanov (RUS)	Elmar Gasimov (AZE)	Lukáš Krpálek (CZE)
Half-heavyweight (−100 kg)	Adlan Bisultanov (RUS)	Elmar Gasimov (AZE)	Dmytro Luchyn (UKR)
Heavyweight (+100 kg)	Magomed Nazhmudinov (RUS)	Faïcel Jaballah (TUN)	Chris Sherrington (GBR)
Heavyweight (+100 kg)	Magomed Nazhmudinov (RUS)	Faïcel Jaballah (TUN)	Islam El Shehaby (EGY)

=== Women's events ===
Event	Gold	Silver	Bronze
Extra-lightweight (−48 kg)	Charline Van Snick (BEL)	Kay Kraus (GER)	Sümeyye Akkuş (TUR)
Extra-lightweight (−48 kg)	Charline Van Snick (BEL)	Kay Kraus (GER)	Alesya Kuznetsova (RUS)
Half-lightweight (−52 kg)	Majlinda Kelmendi (KOS)	Mareen Kräh (GER)	Adiyaasambuugiin Tsolmon (MGL)
Half-lightweight (−52 kg)	Majlinda Kelmendi (KOS)	Mareen Kräh (GER)	Natalia Kuziutina (RUS)
Lightweight (−57 kg)	Sabrina Filzmoser (AUT)	Johanna Müller (GER)	Irina Zabludina (RUS)
Lightweight (−57 kg)	Sabrina Filzmoser (AUT)	Johanna Müller (GER)	Tina Zeltner (AUT)
Half-middleweight (−63 kg)	Gévrise Émane (FRA)	Yarden Gerbi (ISR)	Alice Schlesinger (ISR)
Half-middleweight (−63 kg)	Gévrise Émane (FRA)	Yarden Gerbi (ISR)	Kathrin Unterwurzacher (AUT)
Middleweight (−70 kg)	Sally Conway (GBR)	Assmaa Niang (MAR)	Bernadette Graf (AUT)
Middleweight (−70 kg)	Sally Conway (GBR)	Assmaa Niang (MAR)	Fanny Estelle Posvite (FRA)
Half-heavyweight (−78 kg)	Luise Malzahn (GER)	Anastasiya Dmitrieva (RUS)	Géraldine Mentouopou (FRA)
Half-heavyweight (−78 kg)	Luise Malzahn (GER)	Anastasiya Dmitrieva (RUS)	Natalie Powell (GBR)
Heavyweight (+78 kg)	Belkıs Zehra Kaya (TUR)	Carolin Weiß (GER)	Gülşah Kocatürk (TUR)
Heavyweight (+78 kg)	Belkıs Zehra Kaya (TUR)	Carolin Weiß (GER)	Jasmin Kuelbs (GER)

Source Results

=== Medal table ===
* Host nation (Turkey)

Rank	Nation	Gold	Silver	Bronze	Total
1	Russia (RUS)	4	1	6	11
2	France (FRA)	2	0	4	6
3	Germany (GER)	1	4	1	6
4	Mongolia (MGL)	1	1	1	3
4	Ukraine (UKR)	1	1	1	3
6	Austria (AUT)	1	0	3	4
7	Great Britain (GBR)	1	0	2	3
7	Turkey (TUR)*	1	0	2	3
9	Belgium (BEL)	1	0	0	1
9	Kosovo (KOS)	1	0	0	1
11	Israel (ISR)	0	2	1	3
12	Azerbaijan (AZE)	0	1	1	2
13	Kazakhstan (KAZ)	0	1	0	1
13	Morocco (MAR)	0	1	0	1
13	Netherlands (NED)	0	1	0	1
13	Tunisia (TUN)	0	1	0	1
17	Czech Republic (CZE)	0	0	3	3
18	Egypt (EGY)	0	0	2	2
19	Georgia (GEO)	0	0	1	1
Totals (19 entries)		14	14	28	56
