= Jasper Lefevere =

Belgian judoka (born 1988)

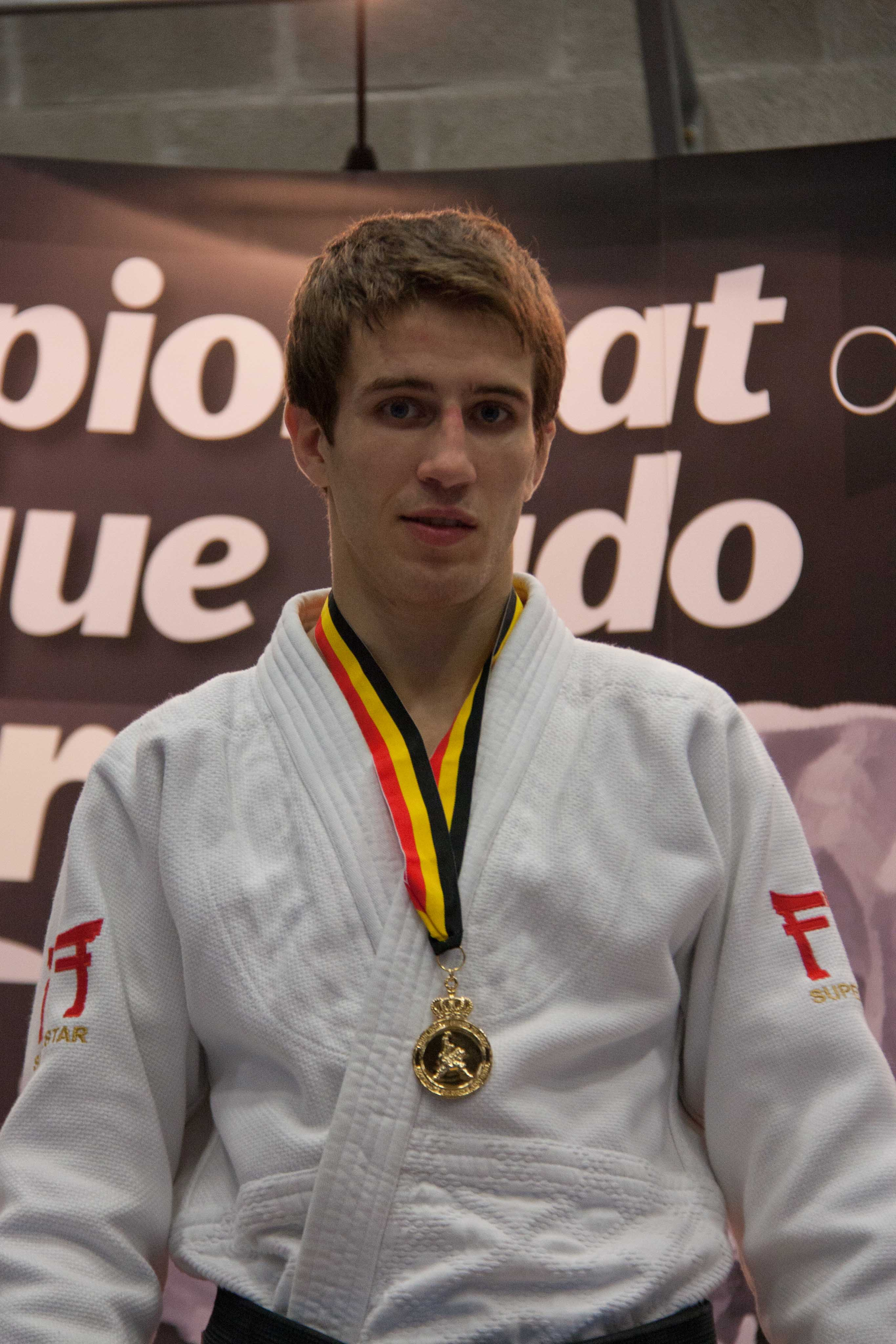
- Lefevere in 2012

Personal information
- Born: 13 July 1988 (age 37)
- Occupation: Judoka

Sport
- Country: Belgium
- Sport: Judo
- Weight class: ‍–‍66 kg

Achievements and titles
- Olympic Games: R64 (2016)
- World Champ.: R32 (2014)
- European Champ.: R16 (2015, 2016, 2017)
Medal record
Men's judo
Representing Belgium
IJF Grand Prix
Gold medal – first place	2014 Zagreb	‍–‍66 kg

Profile at external databases
- IJF: 3709
- JudoInside.com: 46020
- Updated on 18 December 2022

Jasper Lefevere (born 13 July 1988) is a Belgian judoka. He competed at the 2016 Summer Olympics in the men's 66 kg event, in which he was eliminated in the first round by Zhansay Smagulov.
