= Rodrick Kuku =

Congolese judoka

Personal information
- Full name: KUKU NDONGALA RODRICK
- Nickname: Armelourd
- Nationality: DR Congo
- Born: KUKU; 6 April 1994 (age 32) kinshasa
- Occupation: Judoka

Sport
- Sport: Judo
- Club: Tusk Judo club
- Team: team R.kuku
- Coached by: Nikola Fillipov

Profile at external databases
- IJF: 9778
- JudoInside.com: 105722

Rodrick Kuku (born 6 April 1990) is a DR Congo judoka.

He competed at the 2016 Summer Olympics in Rio de Janeiro, in the men's 66 kg but lost to Wander Mateo in the second round.
