= Vyacheslav Mikhailovich Briman =

Soviet and Ukrainian judo coach

Personal information
- Native name: Вячеслав Михайлович Бриман
- Nationality: Ukrainian
- Born: February 1, 1963 (age 63) Kiev, Soviet Union
- Education: National University of Ukraine on Physical Education and Sport
- Occupation: judo coach

Sport
- Country: Soviet Union, Ukraine
- Sport: judo
Medal record
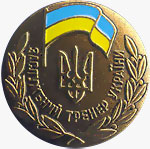

Vyacheslav Mikhailovich Briman (Ukrainian: В’ячеслав Михайлович Бриман; born 1963) — Soviet and Ukrainian judo coach, master of sports of the USSR, referee of the republican category, honored coach of Ukraine, honorary donor of Ukraine.

== Biography ==
Senior teacher of physical education at the Kiev secondary school No. 248 of I-III levels of accreditation, specialist (highest) of the first category. In 1990, 1994 and 2010, he took advanced training courses at the Kiev State Institute of Physical Culture (which he graduated in 1999, master's degree at the National Pedagogical Drahomanov University), in 2013, refresher courses at the Institute of Postgraduate Pedagogical Education at the Borys Grinchenko Kyiv University. The first coach of the world champion in judo G. M. Zantaraya, coached him from 8 to 16 years. Received 6th dan in judo at the International Judo Federation. Participant of the competition for the position of the head coach of the Ukrainian national team. In 2018, in the city of Ta' Xbiex, he confirmed the status of a sports instructor in judo from the academy of the International Judo Federation (IJF Academy).

== See also ==
- Judo Federation of Ukraine
