= 2014 Judo Grand Slam Tokyo =

Judo competition

Judo 2014 Judo Grand Slam Tokyo
- Venue: Tokyo Metropolitan Gymnasium
- Location: Tokyo, Japan
- Dates: 5–7 December 2014
- Competitors: 416 from 65 nations

Competition at external databases
- Links: IJF • EJU • JudoInside

The 2014 Judo Grand Slam Tokyo was held in Tokyo, Japan, from 5 to 7 December 2014.

== Medal summary ==
=== Men's events ===
Event	Gold	Silver	Bronze
Extra-lightweight (−60 kg)	Kim Won-jin (KOR)	Toru Shishime (JPN)	Rustam Ibrayev (KAZ)
Extra-lightweight (−60 kg)	Kim Won-jin (KOR)	Toru Shishime (JPN)	Yuma Oshima (JPN)
Half-lightweight (−66 kg)	Hifumi Abe (JPN)	Golan Pollack (ISR)	Mikhail Pulyaev (RUS)
Half-lightweight (−66 kg)	Hifumi Abe (JPN)	Golan Pollack (ISR)	Kengo Takaichi (JPN)
Lightweight (−73 kg)	Hiroyuki Akimoto (JPN)	Shohei Ono (JPN)	An Chang-rim (KOR)
Lightweight (−73 kg)	Hiroyuki Akimoto (JPN)	Shohei Ono (JPN)	Miklós Ungvári (HUN)
Half-middleweight (−81 kg)	Takanori Nagase (JPN)	Sergiu Toma (UAE)	Avtandili Tchrikishvili (GEO)
Half-middleweight (−81 kg)	Takanori Nagase (JPN)	Sergiu Toma (UAE)	Alexander Wieczerzak (GER)
Middleweight (−90 kg)	Gwak Dong-han (KOR)	Daiki Nishiyama (JPN)	Mashu Baker (JPN)
Middleweight (−90 kg)	Gwak Dong-han (KOR)	Daiki Nishiyama (JPN)	Kim Jae-yun (KOR)
Half-heavyweight (−100 kg)	Cho Gu-ham (KOR)	Cyrille Maret (FRA)	Artem Bloshenko (UKR)
Half-heavyweight (−100 kg)	Cho Gu-ham (KOR)	Cyrille Maret (FRA)	Henk Grol (NED)
Heavyweight (+100 kg)	Renat Saidov (RUS)	Levani Matiashvili (GEO)	Keita Iwao (JPN)
Heavyweight (+100 kg)	Renat Saidov (RUS)	Levani Matiashvili (GEO)	Takeshi Ōjitani (JPN)

=== Women's events ===
Event	Gold	Silver	Bronze
Extra-lightweight (−48 kg)	Ami Kondo (JPN)	Haruna Sakamoto (JPN)	Jeong Bo-kyeong (KOR)
Extra-lightweight (−48 kg)	Ami Kondo (JPN)	Haruna Sakamoto (JPN)	Paula Pareto (ARG)
Half-lightweight (−52 kg)	Yuki Hashimoto (JPN)	Yuka Nishida (JPN)	Misato Nakamura (JPN)
Half-lightweight (−52 kg)	Yuki Hashimoto (JPN)	Yuka Nishida (JPN)	Ai Shishime (JPN)
Lightweight (−57 kg)	Kaori Matsumoto (JPN)	Telma Monteiro (POR)	Tsukasa Yoshida (JPN)
Lightweight (−57 kg)	Kaori Matsumoto (JPN)	Telma Monteiro (POR)	Rafaela Silva (BRA)
Half-middleweight (−63 kg)	Tina Trstenjak (SLO)	Edwige Gwend (ITA)	Maho Nishikawa (JPN)
Half-middleweight (−63 kg)	Tina Trstenjak (SLO)	Edwige Gwend (ITA)	Anicka van Emden (NED)
Middleweight (−70 kg)	Gévrise Émane (FRA)	Haruka Tachimoto (JPN)	Laura Vargas Koch (GER)
Middleweight (−70 kg)	Gévrise Émane (FRA)	Haruka Tachimoto (JPN)	Kelita Zupancic (CAN)
Half-heavyweight (−78 kg)	Kayla Harrison (USA)	Ruika Sato (JPN)	Shori Hamada (JPN)
Half-heavyweight (−78 kg)	Kayla Harrison (USA)	Ruika Sato (JPN)	Anamari Velenšek (SLO)
Heavyweight (+78 kg)	Nami Inamori (JPN)	Sarah Asahina (JPN)	Ksenia Chibisova (RUS)
Heavyweight (+78 kg)	Nami Inamori (JPN)	Sarah Asahina (JPN)	Megumi Tachimoto (JPN)

Source Results

=== Medal table ===
* Host nation (Japan)

Rank	Nation	Gold	Silver	Bronze	Total
1	Japan (JPN)*	7	8	11	26
2	South Korea (KOR)	3	0	3	6
3	France (FRA)	1	1	0	2
4	Russia (RUS)	1	0	2	3
5	Slovenia (SLO)	1	0	1	2
6	United States (USA)	1	0	0	1
7	Georgia (GEO)	0	1	1	2
8	Israel (ISR)	0	1	0	1
8	Italy (ITA)	0	1	0	1
8	Portugal (POR)	0	1	0	1
8	United Arab Emirates (UAE)	0	1	0	1
12	Germany (GER)	0	0	2	2
12	Netherlands (NED)	0	0	2	2
14	Argentina (ARG)	0	0	1	1
14	Brazil (BRA)	0	0	1	1
14	Canada (CAN)	0	0	1	1
14	Hungary (HUN)	0	0	1	1
14	Kazakhstan (KAZ)	0	0	1	1
14	Ukraine (UKR)	0	0	1	1
Totals (19 entries)		14	14	28	56
