= Sergiu Oleinic =

Portuguese judoka (born 1985)

Personal information
- Nationality: Portuguese
- Born: 25 December 1985 (age 40)
- Occupation: Judoka

Sport
- Country: Portugal
- Sport: Judo
- Weight class: –66 kg

Achievements and titles
- Olympic Games: R16 (2016)
- World Champ.: R16 (2015)
- European Champ.: 5th (2015)
Medal record
Men's judo
Representing Portugal
IJF Grand Prix
Silver medal – second place	2017 Zagreb	–66 kg
Bronze medal – third place	2015 Samsun	–66 kg
Bronze medal – third place	2015 Budapest	–66 kg

Profile at external databases
- IJF: 2701
- JudoInside.com: 54131
- Updated on 7 December 2022

Sergiu Oleinic (born 25 December 1985) is a Moldovan-born Portuguese judoka. He competed at the 2016 Summer Olympics in Rio de Janeiro, in the men's 66 kg, where he was eliminate in the third round.

At club level, he represents the Lisbon-based Sporting CP.
