= 2014 Judo Grand Slam Baku =

Judo competition

Judo 2014 Judo Grand Slam Baku
- Location: Baku, Azerbaijan
- Dates: 9–11 May 2014
- Competitors: 246 from 41 nations

Competition at external databases
- Links: IJF • EJU • JudoInside

The 2014 Judo Grand Slam Baku was held in Baku, Azerbaijan, from 9 to 11 May 2014.

== Medal summary ==
=== Men's events ===
Event	Gold	Silver	Bronze
Extra-lightweight (−60 kg)	Orkhan Safarov (AZE)	Vugar Shirinli (AZE)	Sharafuddin Lutfillaev (UZB)
Extra-lightweight (−60 kg)	Orkhan Safarov (AZE)	Vugar Shirinli (AZE)	Sofiane Milous (FRA)
Half-lightweight (−66 kg)	Colin Oates (GBR)	Kamal Khan-Magomedov (RUS)	Kim Lim-hwan (KOR)
Half-lightweight (−66 kg)	Colin Oates (GBR)	Kamal Khan-Magomedov (RUS)	Golan Pollack (ISR)
Lightweight (−73 kg)	Sagi Muki (ISR)	Florent Urani (FRA)	Rustam Orujov (AZE)
Lightweight (−73 kg)	Sagi Muki (ISR)	Florent Urani (FRA)	Victor Scvortov (UAE)
Half-middleweight (−81 kg)	Alan Khubetsov (RUS)	Ushangi Margiani (GEO)	Mammadali Mehdiyev (AZE)
Half-middleweight (−81 kg)	Alan Khubetsov (RUS)	Ushangi Margiani (GEO)	Antoine Valois-Fortier (CAN)
Middleweight (−90 kg)	Guillaume Elmont (NED)	Noël van 't End (NED)	Murat Gasiev (RUS)
Middleweight (−90 kg)	Guillaume Elmont (NED)	Noël van 't End (NED)	Beka Gviniashvili (GEO)
Half-heavyweight (−100 kg)	Maxim Rakov (KAZ)	Elkhan Mammadov (AZE)	Soyib Kurbonov (UZB)
Half-heavyweight (−100 kg)	Maxim Rakov (KAZ)	Elkhan Mammadov (AZE)	Ramziddin Sayidov (UZB)
Heavyweight (+100 kg)	Faïcel Jaballah (TUN)	Anton Krivobokov (RUS)	Daniel Natea (ROU)
Heavyweight (+100 kg)	Faïcel Jaballah (TUN)	Anton Krivobokov (RUS)	Renat Saidov (RUS)

=== Women's events ===
Event	Gold	Silver	Bronze
Extra-lightweight (−48 kg)	Mönkhbatyn Urantsetseg (MGL)	Amélie Rosseneu (ISR)	Nataliya Kondratyeva (RUS)
Extra-lightweight (−48 kg)	Mönkhbatyn Urantsetseg (MGL)	Amélie Rosseneu (ISR)	Dilara Lokmanhekim (TUR)
Half-lightweight (−52 kg)	Annabelle Euranie (FRA)	Priscilla Gneto (FRA)	Petra Nareks (SLO)
Half-lightweight (−52 kg)	Annabelle Euranie (FRA)	Priscilla Gneto (FRA)	Roni Schwartz (ISR)
Lightweight (−57 kg)	Sabrina Filzmoser (AUT)	Vlora Beđeti (SLO)	Laëtitia Blot (FRA)
Lightweight (−57 kg)	Sabrina Filzmoser (AUT)	Vlora Beđeti (SLO)	Kifayat Gasimova (AZE)
Half-middleweight (−63 kg)	Anne-Laure Bellard (FRA)	Kathrin Unterwurzacher (AUT)	Edwige Gwend (ITA)
Half-middleweight (−63 kg)	Anne-Laure Bellard (FRA)	Kathrin Unterwurzacher (AUT)	Anicka van Emden (NED)
Middleweight (−70 kg)	Kim Polling (NED)	Sally Conway (GBR)	Katarzyna Kłys (POL)
Middleweight (−70 kg)	Kim Polling (NED)	Sally Conway (GBR)	Heide Wollert (GER)
Half-heavyweight (−78 kg)	Madeleine Malonga (FRA)	Assunta Galeone (ITA)	Anastasiya Dmitrieva (RUS)
Half-heavyweight (−78 kg)	Madeleine Malonga (FRA)	Assunta Galeone (ITA)	Guusje Steenhuis (NED)
Heavyweight (+78 kg)	Kim Min-jeong (KOR)	Nihel Cheikh Rouhou (TUN)	Ksenia Chibisova (RUS)
Heavyweight (+78 kg)	Kim Min-jeong (KOR)	Nihel Cheikh Rouhou (TUN)	Sandra Jablonskytė (LTU)

Source Results

=== Medal table ===
* Host nation (Azerbaijan)

Rank	Nation	Gold	Silver	Bronze	Total
1	France (FRA)	3	2	2	7
2	Netherlands (NED)	2	1	2	5
3	Russia (RUS)	1	2	5	8
4	Azerbaijan (AZE)*	1	2	3	6
5	Israel (ISR)	1	1	2	4
6	Austria (AUT)	1	1	0	2
6	Great Britain (GBR)	1	1	0	2
6	Tunisia (TUN)	1	1	0	2
9	South Korea (KOR)	1	0	1	2
10	Kazakhstan (KAZ)	1	0	0	1
10	Mongolia (MGL)	1	0	0	1
12	Georgia (GEO)	0	1	1	2
12	Italy (ITA)	0	1	1	2
12	Slovenia (SLO)	0	1	1	2
15	Uzbekistan (UZB)	0	0	3	3
16	Canada (CAN)	0	0	1	1
16	Germany (GER)	0	0	1	1
16	Lithuania (LTU)	0	0	1	1
16	Poland (POL)	0	0	1	1
16	Romania (ROU)	0	0	1	1
16	Turkey (TUR)	0	0	1	1
16	United Arab Emirates (UAE)	0	0	1	1
Totals (22 entries)		14	14	28	56
