= 2014 World Judo Championships =

Judo competition

Judo 2014 World Judo Championships
- Venue: Traktor Ice Arena
- Location: Chelyabinsk, Russia
- Dates: 25–31 August 2014
- Competitors: 637 from 110 nations
- Total prize money: 300,000$
- Website: Official website

Champions
- Men's team: Japan (5th title)
- Women's team: France (3rd title)

Competition at external databases
- Links: IJF • EJU • JudoInside

The 2014 World Judo Championships were held in Chelyabinsk, Russia, from 25 to 31 August 2014, in the Traktor Ice Arena. Each participating country was permitted to present a total of 18 men and women judokas to participate in the 14 weight categories (7 male and 7 female), but no more than two judokas from the same country were allowed to fight in the same category.

== Bids ==
Bids were made by Azerbaijan, Russia, South Korea, United Arab Emirates, and the United States to the International Judo Federation for the initial staging of the championships. On 2 October 2012, it was announced that Russia would hold the full championships for the first time. Previously, the 1983 World Judo Championships had been held in the Soviet Union (Moscow) and the open category of the 2011 Championships were held in Tyumen. One reason for the choice was the successful staging of the 2012 European Judo Championships in Chelyabinsk.

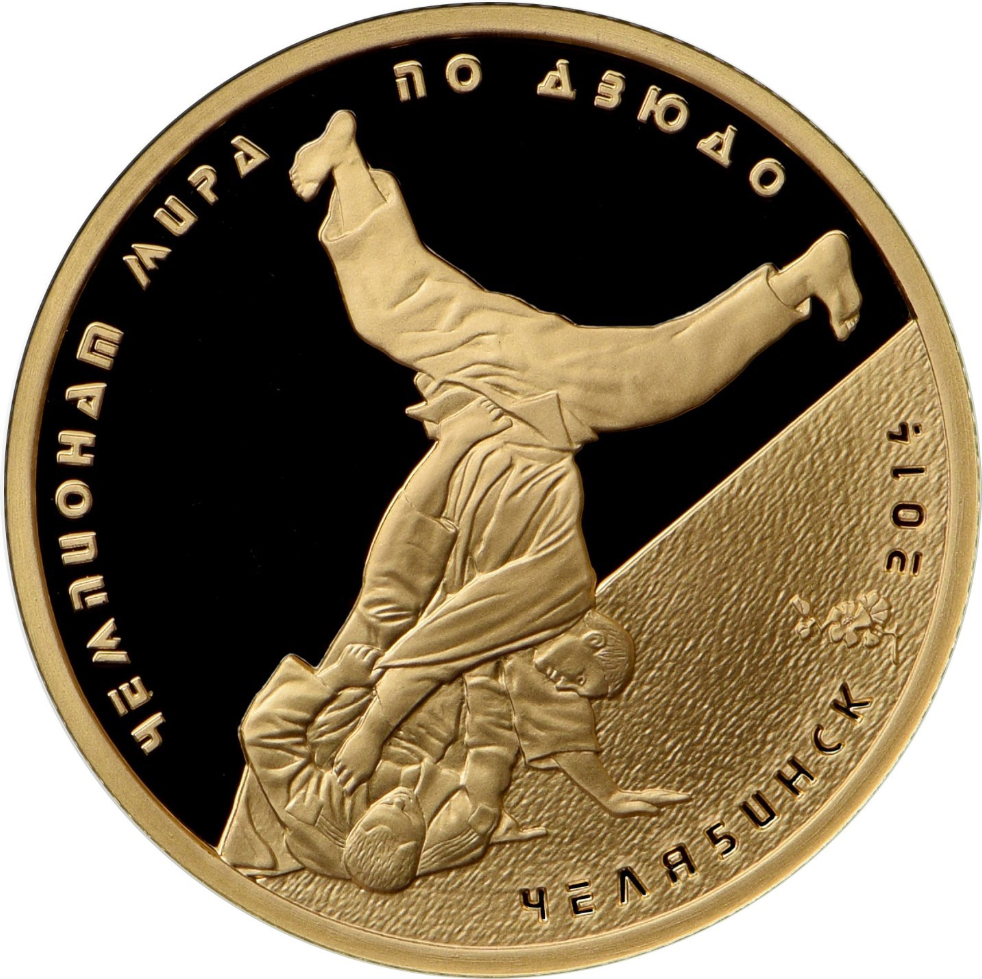
Gold commemorative coin of Russia, 2014

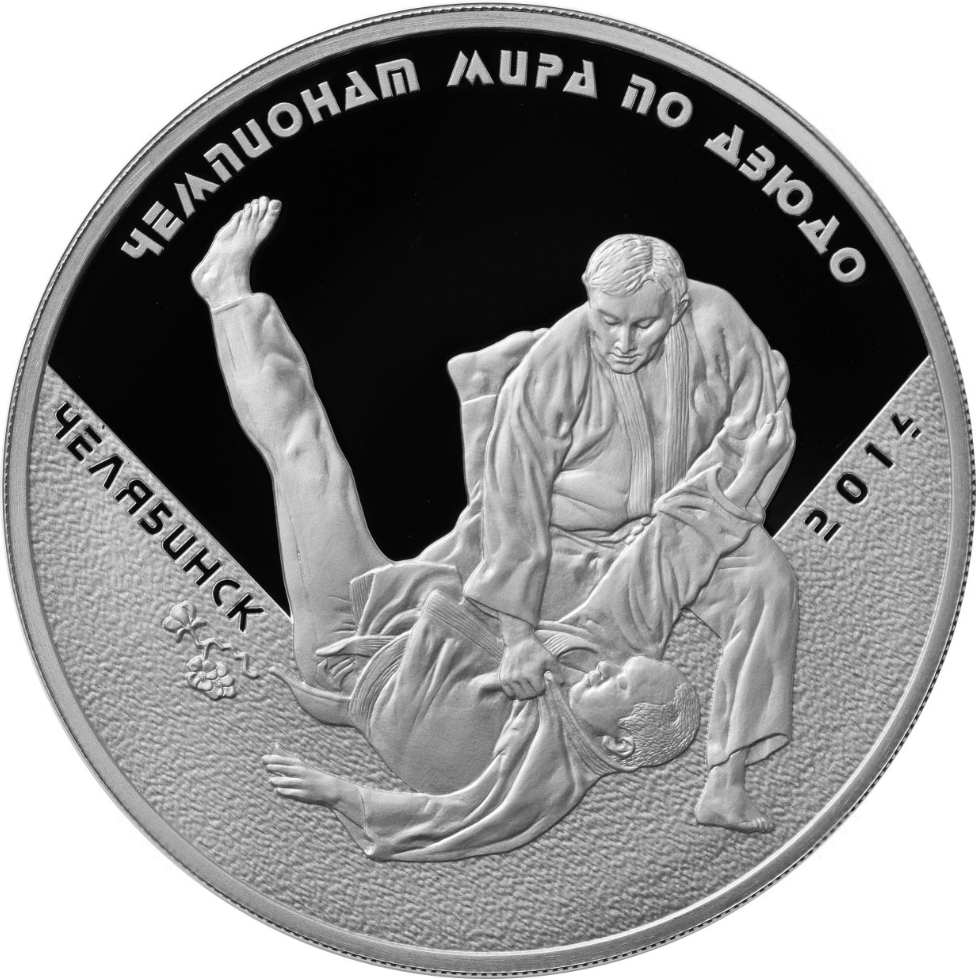
Silver commemorative coin of Russia, 2014

On 17 December 2012, at the Ritz-Carlton in Moscow, the President of IJF Marius Wizer, Mikhail Yurevich (the governor of Chelyabinsk Oblast) and Sergey Soloveychik, the vice-president of the Russian Judo Federation and the head of the European Judo Union, signed an agreement to host the championships.

On 2 September 2013, following the 2013 World Judo Championships, the flag of the International Judo Federation was passed to a representative of the Russian Judo Federation.

On 19 March 2014, the regulations of the competitions were approved for the competition. The championship took place between 25 and 31 August, with the individual tournament taking place between 25 and 30 August, and the team tournament on 31 August.

== Venue ==
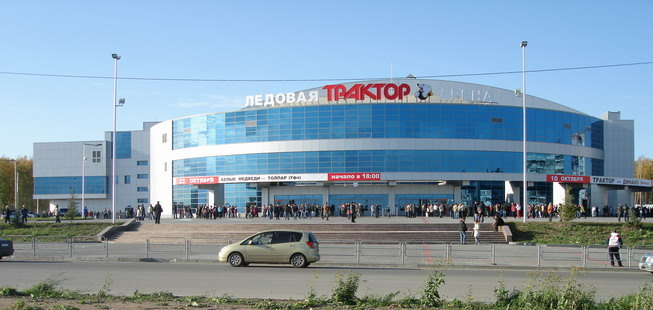
Traktor Ice Arena

The championships were held at the Traktor Ice Arena, with a capacity of 7,500 spectators.

== Mascot ==
The mascot of the championships was a baby tiger named Zhorik, a diminutive form of Georgiy. The mascot was chosen in a unanimous vote held before the 2012 European Judo Championships.

== Logo ==
The logo of the championships was a blue-white rectangle, augmented at the base by a red belt. The colours of the logo repeat the Russian flag. The logo also features a white silhouette of Vladimir Putin taken from a photo on the cover of the book Learn Judo with Vladimir Putin.

== Prize money ==
Total prize money was $300,000. The winner of the individual competition received $6,000 ($4,800 for the judoka and $1,200 for the coach), the runner-up $4,000 ($3,200 and $800, for the judoka and the coach respectively) and the bronze medalist $2,000 ($1,600 and $400, respectively). The two best judokas (man and woman) were awarded $2,000.

The winners of the team competition received a total of $25,000 ($20,000 for judokas and $5,000 for coaches), the runner-up $15,000 ($12,000 and $3,000 respectively) and the bronze medalist $5,000 ($4,000 and $1,000 respectively).

Medal	Individual			Mixed team		
Medal	Total	Judoka	Coach	Total	Judoka	Coach
Gold	$6,000	$4,800	$1,200	$25,000	$20,000	$5,000
Silver	$4,000	$3,200	$800	$15,000	$12,000	$3,000
Bronze	$2,000	$1,600	$400	$5,000	$4,000	$1,000

== Rules ==
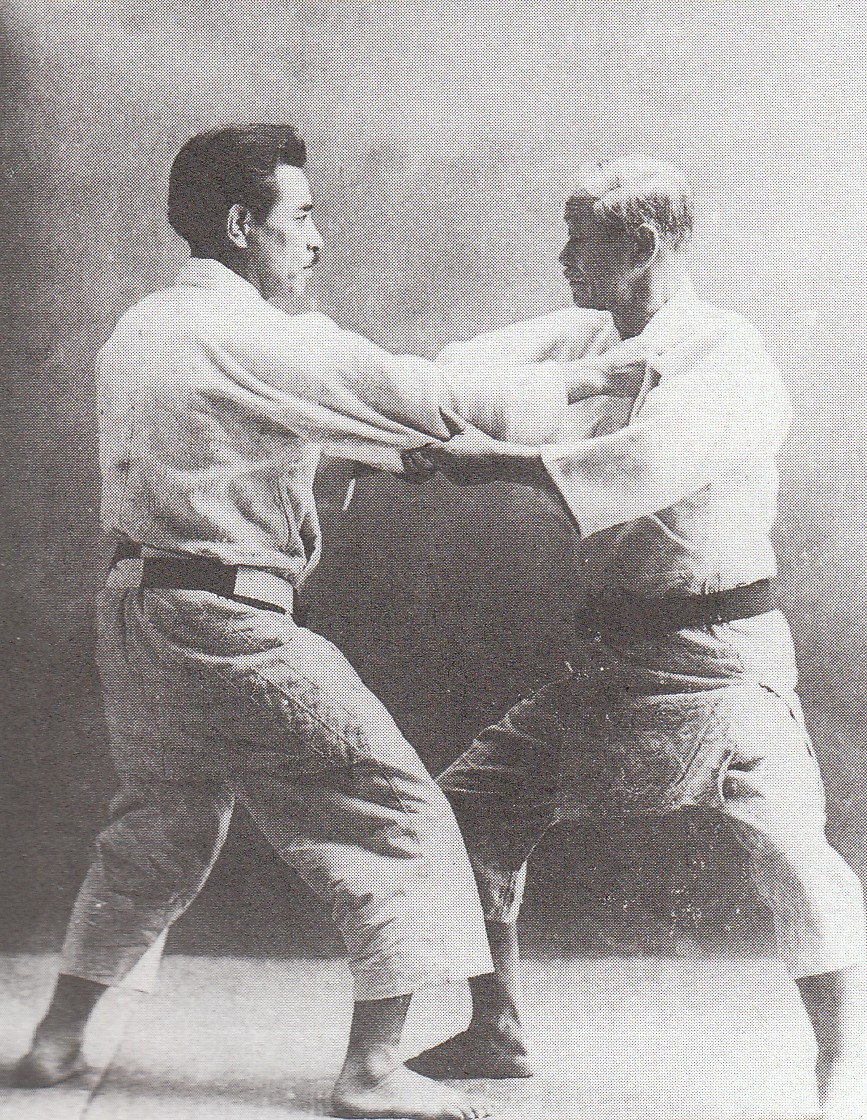
Classical standing of judoka during fight

The rules of competition changed on January 1, 2014.

The IJF continued to differentiate judo from other kinds of wrestling, particularly from sambo, and reverted to classical judo traditions. Activity by the hands below the belt in standing position, limited by 2010 rules, is now fully forbidden under penalty of disqualification. In the spirit of saving specific characteristics of judo, possibility of fight for hold is limited: wrong methods of protection from holds is prohibited, and there is a limit to the number of protections from holds. Likewise, other methods of evading fight or blocking of an opponent are forbidden; for example, false attacks or coercion to assume bend position by power. The criteria of victory by fall (ippon) is specified: now a throw must have more power, quickness and amplitude with the fall of the opponent straight to their back. Rituals about combat were also modified: for example, opponents must greet each other only by bows; as handshaking before combat is now forbidden. The Golden score overtime is not limited by time, and winning by judge decision (hantei) is abolished.

== Medal summary ==
=== Medal table ===
Rank	Nation	Gold	Silver	Bronze	Total
1	Japan	5	2	4	11
2	France	3	1	4	8
3	Brazil	1	1	2	4
3	Cuba	1	1	2	4
5	Mongolia	1	1	0	2
6	Georgia	1	0	3	4
7	Colombia	1	0	0	1
7	Czech Republic	1	0	0	1
7	Greece	1	0	0	1
7	Independent Participants^{A}	1	0	0	1
11	Russia	0	3	6	9
12	Argentina	0	1	0	1
12	Canada	0	1	0	1
12	Hungary	0	1	0	1
12	Israel	0	1	0	1
12	North Korea	0	1	0	1
12	Portugal	0	1	0	1
12	Romania	0	1	0	1
19	Germany	0	0	3	3
20	Slovenia	0	0	2	2
20	United Arab Emirates	0	0	2	2
22	Netherlands	0	0	1	1
22	Poland	0	0	1	1
22	Ukraine	0	0	1	1
22	United States	0	0	1	1
Totals (25 entries)		16	16	32	64

=== Men's events ===
Event	Gold	Silver	Bronze
Extra-lightweight (60 kg)	Boldbaatar Ganbat; Mongolia	Beslan Mudranov; Russia	Amiran Papinashvili; Georgia
Extra-lightweight (60 kg)	Boldbaatar Ganbat; Mongolia	Beslan Mudranov; Russia	Naohisa Takato; Japan
Half-lightweight (66 kg)	Masashi Ebinuma; Japan	Mikhail Pulyaev; Russia	Georgii Zantaraia; Ukraine
Half-lightweight (66 kg)	Masashi Ebinuma; Japan	Mikhail Pulyaev; Russia	Kamal Khan-Magomedov; Russia
Lightweight (73 kg)	Riki Nakaya; Japan	Hong Kuk-hyon; North Korea	Victor Scvortov; United Arab Emirates
Lightweight (73 kg)	Riki Nakaya; Japan	Hong Kuk-hyon; North Korea	Musa Mogushkov; Russia
Half-middleweight (81 kg)	Avtandil Tchrikishvili; Georgia	Antoine Valois-Fortier; Canada	Loïc Pietri; France
Half-middleweight (81 kg)	Avtandil Tchrikishvili; Georgia	Antoine Valois-Fortier; Canada	Ivan Nifontov; Russia
Middleweight (90 kg)	Ilias Iliadis; Greece	Krisztián Tóth; Hungary	Varlam Liparteliani; Georgia
Middleweight (90 kg)	Ilias Iliadis; Greece	Krisztián Tóth; Hungary	Kirill Voprosov; Russia
Half-heavyweight (100 kg)	Lukáš Krpálek; Czech Republic	José Armenteros; Cuba	Ivan Remarenco; United Arab Emirates
Half-heavyweight (100 kg)	Lukáš Krpálek; Czech Republic	José Armenteros; Cuba	Karl-Richard Frey; Germany
Heavyweight (+100 kg)	Teddy Riner; France	Ryu Shichinohe; Japan	Renat Saidov; Russia
Heavyweight (+100 kg)	Teddy Riner; France	Ryu Shichinohe; Japan	Rafael Silva; Brazil
Team	Japan; Mashu Baker (–90 kg); Masashi Ebinuma (–66 kg); Daiki Kamikawa (+90 kg); Takanori Nagase (–81 kg); Riki Nakaya (–73 kg); Daiki Nishiyama (–90 kg); Shohei Ono (–73 kg); Ryu Shichinohe (+90 kg); Kengo Takaichi (–66 kg)	Russia; Kirill Denisov (–90 kg); Alim Gadanov (–66 kg); Denis Iartcev (–73 kg); Aslan Kambiev (+90 kg); Murat Khabachirov (–81 kg); Kamal Khan-Magomedov (–66 kg); Magomed Magomedov (–90 kg); Sirazhudin Magomedov (–81 kg); Zelimkhan Ozdoev (–73 kg); Andrey Volkov (+90 kg)	Germany; Andreas Breitbarth (+90 kg); Sven Maresch (–81 kg); Marc Odenthal (–90 kg); Dimitri Peters (+90 kg); René Schneider (–66 kg); Sebastian Seidl (–66 kg); Christopher Völk (–73 kg)
Team	Japan; Mashu Baker (–90 kg); Masashi Ebinuma (–66 kg); Daiki Kamikawa (+90 kg); Takanori Nagase (–81 kg); Riki Nakaya (–73 kg); Daiki Nishiyama (–90 kg); Shohei Ono (–73 kg); Ryu Shichinohe (+90 kg); Kengo Takaichi (–66 kg)	Russia; Kirill Denisov (–90 kg); Alim Gadanov (–66 kg); Denis Iartcev (–73 kg); Aslan Kambiev (+90 kg); Murat Khabachirov (–81 kg); Kamal Khan-Magomedov (–66 kg); Magomed Magomedov (–90 kg); Sirazhudin Magomedov (–81 kg); Zelimkhan Ozdoev (–73 kg); Andrey Volkov (+90 kg)	Georgia; Beka Gviniashvili (–90 kg); Shalva Kardava (–66 kg); Varlam Liparteliani (–90 kg); Levani Matiashvili (+90 kg); Adam Okruashvili (+90 kg); Amiran Papinashvili (–66 kg); Zebeda Rekhviashvili (–81 kg); Lasha Shavdatuashvili (–73 kg); Nugzar Tatalashvili (–73 kg); Avtandil Tchrikishvili (–81 kg)

=== Women's events ===
Event	Gold	Silver	Bronze
Extra-lightweight (48 kg)	Ami Kondo; Japan	Paula Pareto; Argentina	Amandine Buchard; France
Extra-lightweight (48 kg)	Ami Kondo; Japan	Paula Pareto; Argentina	Maria Celia Laborde; Cuba
Half-lightweight (52 kg)	Majlinda Kelmendi; Independent Participants ^{A}	Andreea Chițu; Romania	Érika Miranda; Brazil
Half-lightweight (52 kg)	Majlinda Kelmendi; Independent Participants ^{A}	Andreea Chițu; Romania	Natalia Kuziutina; Russia
Lightweight (57 kg)	Nae Udaka; Japan	Telma Monteiro; Portugal	Sanne Verhagen; Netherlands
Lightweight (57 kg)	Nae Udaka; Japan	Telma Monteiro; Portugal	Automne Pavia; France
Half-middleweight (63 kg)	Clarisse Agbegnenou; France	Yarden Gerbi; Israel	Miku Tashiro; Japan
Half-middleweight (63 kg)	Clarisse Agbegnenou; France	Yarden Gerbi; Israel	Tina Trstenjak; Slovenia
Middleweight (70 kg)	Yuri Alvear; Colombia	Karen Nun-Ira; Japan	Onix Cortés; Cuba
Middleweight (70 kg)	Yuri Alvear; Colombia	Karen Nun-Ira; Japan	Katarzyna Kłys; Poland
Half-heavyweight (78 kg)	Mayra Aguiar; Brazil	Audrey Tcheuméo; France	Kayla Harrison; United States
Half-heavyweight (78 kg)	Mayra Aguiar; Brazil	Audrey Tcheuméo; France	Anamari Velenšek; Slovenia
Heavyweight (+78 kg)	Idalys Ortiz; Cuba	Maria Suelen Altheman; Brazil	Megumi Tachimoto; Japan
Heavyweight (+78 kg)	Idalys Ortiz; Cuba	Maria Suelen Altheman; Brazil	Émilie Andéol; France
Team	France; Clarisse Agbegnenou (–63 kg); Emilie Andeol (+70 kg); Anne-Laure Bellard (–63 kg); Laetitia Blot (–57 kg); Annabelle Euranie (–52 kg); Priscilla Gneto (–52 kg); Automne Pavia (–57 kg); Margaux Pinot (–70 kg); Fanny Posvite (–70 kg); Audrey Tcheuméo (+70 kg)	Mongolia; Adiyasambuugiin Tsolmon (–52 kg); Baldorjyn Möngönchimeg (–63 kg); Battulgyn Mönkhtuya (+70 kg); Dorjsürengiin Sumiyaa (–57 kg); Mönkhbaataryn Bundmaa (–52 kg); Mönkhbatyn Urantsetseg (–57 kg); Tsend-Ayuushiin Naranjargal (–70 kg); Tsend-Ayuushiin Tserennadmid (–63 kg)	Japan; Yuki Hashimoto (–52 kg); Kaori Matsumoto (–57 kg); Karen Nun Ira (–70 kg); Ai Shishime (–52 kg); Haruka Tachimoto (–70 kg); Megumi Tachimoto (+70 kg); Miku Tashiro (–63 kg); Nae Udaka (–57 kg); Kanae Yamabe (+70 kg)
Team	France; Clarisse Agbegnenou (–63 kg); Emilie Andeol (+70 kg); Anne-Laure Bellard (–63 kg); Laetitia Blot (–57 kg); Annabelle Euranie (–52 kg); Priscilla Gneto (–52 kg); Automne Pavia (–57 kg); Margaux Pinot (–70 kg); Fanny Posvite (–70 kg); Audrey Tcheuméo (+70 kg)	Mongolia; Adiyasambuugiin Tsolmon (–52 kg); Baldorjyn Möngönchimeg (–63 kg); Battulgyn Mönkhtuya (+70 kg); Dorjsürengiin Sumiyaa (–57 kg); Mönkhbaataryn Bundmaa (–52 kg); Mönkhbatyn Urantsetseg (–57 kg); Tsend-Ayuushiin Naranjargal (–70 kg); Tsend-Ayuushiin Tserennadmid (–63 kg)	Germany; Mareen Kräh (–52 kg); Jasmin Külbs (+70 kg); Luise Malzahn (+70 kg); Iljana Marzok (–70 kg); Miryam Roper (–57 kg); Romy Tarangul (–52 kg); Martyna Trajdos (–63 kg); Laura Vargas Koch (–70 kg)

== Participating nations ==
- Mexico (8)
- Hong Kong (2)
- Monaco (2)
- Rwanda (1)
- Swaziland (1)
- Saudi Arabia (5)
- Palestine (3)
- United States (11)
- Argentina (6)
- Estonia (4)
- Algeria (11)
- Angola (1)
- Armenia (7)
- Aruba (1)
- American Samoa (1)
- Australia (3)
- Austria (8)
- Azerbaijan (6)
- Burundi (4)
- Belgium (5)
- Bosnia and Herzegovina (2)
- Belarus (9)
- Bolivia (2)
- Brazil (18)
- Bulgaria (4)
- Canada (11)
- China (18)
- Ivory Coast (3)
- Cameroon (3)
- Democratic Republic of the Congo (1)
- Colombia (3)
- Cuba (13)
- Cyprus (4)
- Czech Republic (7)
- Denmark (2)
- Dominican Republic (5)
- Ecuador (5)
- Egypt (4)
- Spain (9)
- Fiji (1)
- Finland (1)
- France (18)
- Gabon (3)
- Great Britain (4)
- Guinea-Bissau (1)
- Georgia (10)
- Germany (17)
- Greece (4)
- Hungary (13)
- Israel (7)
- Italy (12)
- Japan (18)
- Kazakhstan (16)
- Kyrgyzstan (11)
- South Korea (14)
- Kuwait (5)
- Latvia (3)
- Lebanon (3)
- Liechtenstein (1)
- Lithuania (6)
- Madagascar (2)
- Malawi (2)
- Moldova (2)
- Mongolia (18)
- Montenegro (1)
- Mozambique (3)
- Mauritius (1)
- Netherlands (10)
- Nepal (2)
- Niue (1)
- Nauru (1)
- New Zealand (3)
- Pakistan (3)
- Paraguay (2)
- Peru (7)
- Papua New Guinea (2)
- Poland (11)
- Portugal (13)
- North Korea (9)
- Romania (8)
- Russia (18)
- Senegal (1)
- San Marino (1)
- Serbia (5)
- Switzerland (7)
- Slovenia (6)
- Sweden (6)
- Tajikistan (9)
- Turkmenistan (12)
- Chinese Taipei (5)
- Tunisia (9)
- Turkey (4)
- United Arab Emirates (3)
- Ukraine (17)
- Uzbekistan (11)
- Venezuela (10)
- Yemen (4)
- Zambia (3)

== Notes ==
A. Unlike 2013, Kelmendi did not compete under the Kosovo flag but under the International Judo Federation flag.
