= Kamal Khan-Magomedov =

Russian judoka (born 1986)

Personal information
- Full name: Kamal Haji-Kurbanovich Khan-Magomedov
- Born: 17 June 1986 (age 40) Derbent, Dagestan, USSR
- Occupation: Judoka

Sport
- Country: Russia
- Sport: Judo
- Weight class: –66 kg
- Coached by: Sadiq Abdulov

Achievements and titles
- World Champ.: (bronze) (2014)
- European Champ.: (gold) (2015)
Medal record
Men's judo
Representing Russia
World Championships
Silver medal – second place	2014 Chelyabinsk	Men's team
Bronze medal – third place	2014 Chelyabinsk	‍–‍66 kg
European Games
Gold medal – first place	2015 Baku	‍–‍66 kg
Bronze medal – third place	2015 Baku	Men's team
European Championships
Silver medal – second place	2013 Budapest	‍–‍66 kg
Silver medal – second place	2014 Montpellier	Men's team
IJF Grand Slam
Silver medal – second place	2014 Baku	‍–‍66 kg
Bronze medal – third place	2012 Moscow	‍–‍66 kg
IJF Grand Prix
Gold medal – first place	2016 Havana	‍–‍66 kg
Silver medal – second place	2010 Qingdao	‍–‍66 kg
Bronze medal – third place	2012 Qingdao	‍–‍66 kg
Bronze medal – third place	2013 Samsun	‍–‍66 kg
Bronze medal – third place	2013 Qingdao	‍–‍66 kg
Bronze medal – third place	2017 Düsseldorf	‍–‍66 kg
European U23 Championships
Silver medal – second place	2008 Zagreb	‍–‍66 kg

Profile at external databases
- IJF: 1940
- JudoInside.com: 49480
- Updated on 4 July 2023

Kamal Haji-Kurbanovich Khan-Magomedov (Russian: Камал Гаджи-Курба́нович Хан-Магомедов, Azerbaijani: Камал Һаҹы-Гурбанович Хан-Магомедов); born 17 June 1986 in Derbent, Dagestan, Russia) is a Russian judoka of Tabasaran and Azerbaijani descents.

== Career ==
During his early career, he trained at Derbent Sports School No.3 under Sadiq Abdulov. Khan-Magomedov's introduction to the sport of judo was indirect, thinking it was karate: "In our city we did not know what judo was, we were thinking that it was karate, so we went to karate, but it was judo."

Khan-Magomedov won silver in -66 kg at the 2013 European Judo Championships after being defeated by 2012 Olympics Champion Lasha Shavdatuashvili of Georgia. He then won bronze in the -66 kg final category at the 2014 World Judo Championships.

Khan-Magomedov won gold in -66 kg at the inaugural 2015 European Games defeating Frenchman Loïc Korval in the finals held in Baku, Azerbaijan.

He plans to set up a business after completing his career.
