= Masashi Ebinuma =

Japanese judoka (born 1990)

Personal information
- Native name: 海老沼 匡
- Born: 15 February 1990 (age 36) Oyama, Japan
- Home town: Tokyo, Japan
- Education: Meiji University
- Occupation: Judoka
- Height: 170 cm (5 ft 7 in)

Sport
- Country: Japan
- Sport: Judo
- Weight class: ‍–‍66 kg / ‍–‍73 kg
- Rank: 4th dan black belt
- Team: All Japan National Team; Park 24
- Coached by: Kenzo Nakamura

Achievements and titles
- Olympic Games: (bronze) (2012, 2016)
- World Champ.: (gold) (2011, 2013, 2014)
Medal record
Men's judo
Representing Japan
Olympic Games
| Bronze medal – third place | 2012 London | ‍–‍66 kg |
| Bronze medal – third place | 2016 Rio de Janeiro | ‍–‍66 kg |
World Championships
| Gold medal – first place | 2011 Paris | ‍–‍66 kg |
| Gold medal – first place | 2013 Rio de Janeiro | ‍–‍66 kg |
| Gold medal – first place | 2014 Chelyabinsk | ‍–‍66 kg |
Asian Games
| Gold medal – first place | 2018 Jakarta | Mixed Team |
World Masters
| Bronze medal – third place | 2012 Almaty | ‍–‍66 kg |
| Bronze medal – third place | 2019 Qingdao | ‍–‍73 kg |
IJF Grand Slam
| Gold medal – first place | 2009 Tokyo | ‍–‍66 kg |
| Gold medal – first place | 2016 Paris | ‍–‍66 kg |
| Gold medal – first place | 2019 Osaka | ‍–‍73 kg |
| Silver medal – second place | 2015 Tokyo | ‍–‍66 kg |
| Silver medal – second place | 2018 Osaka | ‍–‍73 kg |
| Silver medal – second place | 2019 Düsseldorf | ‍–‍73 kg |
| Bronze medal – third place | 2008 Tokyo | ‍–‍66 kg |
| Bronze medal – third place | 2010 Tokyo | ‍–‍66 kg |
| Bronze medal – third place | 2011 Rio de Janeiro | ‍–‍66 kg |
| Bronze medal – third place | 2011 Tokyo | ‍–‍66 kg |
IJF Grand Prix
| Gold medal – first place | 2009 Abu Dhabi | ‍–‍66 kg |
| Gold medal – first place | 2013 Düsseldorf | ‍–‍66 kg |
| Gold medal – first place | 2014 Düsseldorf | ‍–‍66 kg |
| Silver medal – second place | 2018 Budapest | ‍–‍73 kg |
World Juniors Championships
| Bronze medal – third place | 2008 Bangkok | ‍–‍66 kg |
Asian Junior Championships
| Gold medal – first place | 2006 Jeju | ‍–‍66 kg |
| Bronze medal – third place | 2008 Sana'a | ‍–‍66 kg |
Summer Universiade
| Gold medal – first place | 2009 Belgrade | ‍–‍66 kg |

Profile at external databases
- IJF: 1787
- JudoInside.com: 37687
- Updated on 24 May 2023

Masashi Ebinuma (海老沼 匡, Ebinuma Masashi; born 15 February 1990) is a Japanese judoka. Ebinuma is a triple world champion, having won in 2011, 2013 and 2014. A dominant force in the half-lightweight division, he was ranked first in the world for three years. He is regarded as an ultimate stylist of seoi nage. He is also known for being a quadruple All-Japan national champion.

Ebinuma won bronze medals at the 2012 and 2016 Summer Olympics. He married judoka Kana Abe in 2014. Both spouses are Asian and World champion judokas.

== Career ==
Aside from winning three World Championships gold medals (2011, 2013 and 2014), two Olympic bronze medals (London 2012 and Rio de Janeiro 2016) represent the pinnacle of Ebinuma's career.

The path to the bronze in London included a refereeing controversy as the reviewing jury overturned a decision made on the tatami by the referee and judges. This was the first such occurrence in Olympic judo, and the event triggered a loud negative reaction from some spectators at the ExCel Centre in London. The quarter-final match between Ebinuma and South Korea's Cho Jun-ho initially saw the referee and judges lift the flags and declare Cho the winner. This decision led to a strong negative reaction from some spectators and a visibly disturbed Japanese coach. In an extremely rare move, the reviewing commission decided to accept the complaint then ruled that Ebinuma should be declared the winner. The International Judo Federation emphasized the importance of ensuring the correct fighter wins, acknowledging the close nature of the fight.

In the bronze medal match in the London 2012 Olympics, an ippon was scored against him by Poland's Paweł Zagrodnik. It was downgraded to a waza-ari, saving him from defeat and earning him his first Olympic medal.

At the 2016 Olympics, Ebinuma beat Charles Chibana, Ma Duanbin and Wander Mateo before losing to An Ba-ul. Because An reached the final, Ebinuma was entered into the repechage, where he beat Antoine Bouchard to win his second bronze medal.

== Achievements ==
2006
(gold) Asian U20 Championships -66 kg, Jeju
2008
(bronze) Grand Slam -66 kg, Tokyo
(bronze) World U20 Championships -66 kg, Bangkok
2009
(gold) Summer Universiade -66 kg, Belgrade
(gold) Grand Prix -66 kg, Abu Dhabi
(gold) Grand Slam -66 kg, Tokyo
(silver) World Cup -66 kg, Budapest
2010
(gold) World Cup Team -66 kg, Salvador
(gold) All Japan Judo Championships -66 kg, Fukuoka
(bronze) Grand Slam -66 kg, Tokyo
2011
(gold) World Championships -66 kg, Paris
(gold) All Japan Judo Championships -66 kg, Fukuoka
(silver) World Cup -66 kg, Budapest
(bronze) Grand Slam -66 kg, Rio de Janeiro
(bronze) Grand Slam -66 kg, Tokyo
2012
(gold) All Japan Judo Championships -66 kg, Fukuoka
(bronze) Olympic Games -66 kg, London
(bronze) World Masters -66 kg, Almaty
2013
(gold) World Championships -66 kg, Rio de Janeiro
(gold) Grand Prix -66 kg, Düsseldorf
(silver) All Japan Judo Championships -66 kg, Fukuoka
2014
(gold) Grand Prix -66 kg, Düsseldorf
(gold) World Championships -66 kg, Chelyabinsk
