= Ma Duanbin =

Chinese Olympic judoka

Personal information
- Nationality: Chinese
- Born: 28 March 1990 (age 36) Huanren Manchu Autonomous County, Benxi, Liaoning, China
- Occupation: Judoka

Sport
- Country: China
- Sport: Judo
- Weight class: –66 kg

Achievements and titles
- Olympic Games: R16 (2016)
- World Champ.: 7th (2014)
- Asian Champ.: 5th (2011, 2015, 2016)
Medal record
Men's judo
Representing China
IJF Grand Prix
Silver medal – second place	2015 Tashkent	–66 kg
Bronze medal – third place	2013 Qingdao	–66 kg
Bronze medal – third place	2014 Qingdao	–66 kg
Summer Universiade
Bronze medal – third place	2011 Shenzhen	–66 kg

Profile at external databases
- IJF: 2096
- JudoInside.com: 63300
- Updated on 16 December 2022

Ma Duanbin (born 28 March 1990) is a Chinese judoka.

He has represented his country at the World Judo Championships, and competed at the 2016 Summer Olympics in Rio de Janeiro, in the men's 66 kg.
