= Kengo Takaichi =

Japanese judoka (born 1993)

Personal information
- Born: 6 April 1993 (age 33)
- Occupation: Judoka

Sport
- Country: Japan
- Sport: Judo
- Weight class: ‍–‍66 kg

Achievements and titles
- World Champ.: 5th (2014)
Medal record
Men's judo
Representing Japan
World Masters
| Bronze medal – third place | 2015 Rabat | ‍–‍66 kg |
IJF Grand Slam
| Bronze medal – third place | 2014 Tokyo | ‍–‍66 kg |
| Bronze medal – third place | 2015 Tokyo | ‍–‍66 kg |
IJF Grand Prix
| Gold medal – first place | 2014 Budapest | ‍–‍66 kg |
| Gold medal – first place | 2015 Düsseldorf | ‍–‍66 kg |
| Gold medal – first place | 2016 Tashkent | ‍–‍66 kg |
| Silver medal – second place | 2013 Jeju | ‍–‍66 kg |
| Bronze medal – third place | 2015 Qingdao | ‍–‍66 kg |

Profile at external databases
- IJF: 15216
- JudoInside.com: 83499
- Updated on 20 November 2022

Kengo Takaichi (born 6 April 1993) is a Japanese judoka.

Takaichi is the gold medalist of the 2016 Judo Grand Prix Tashkent in the ‍–‍66 kg category.
