= Sebastian Seidl =

German judoka (born 1990)

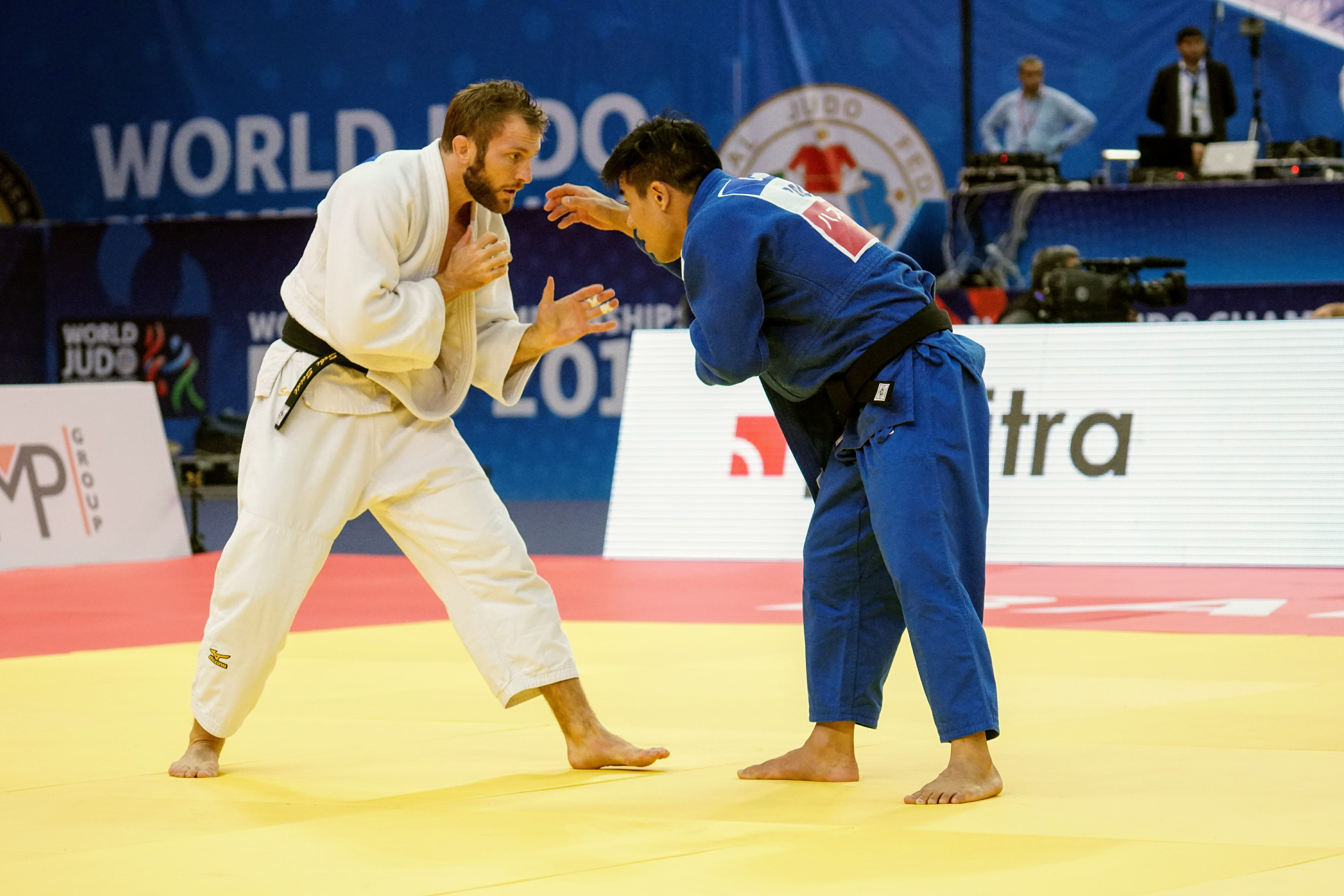
- Seidl in 2018

Personal information
- Born: 12 July 1990 (age 35) Nürtingen, West Germany
- Occupation: Judoka
- Height: 174 cm (5 ft 9 in)

Sport
- Country: Germany
- Sport: Judo
- Weight class: ‍–‍66 kg

Achievements and titles
- Olympic Games: R32 (2016, 2020)
- World Champ.: 7th (2015)
- European Champ.: (bronze) (2015)
Medal record
Men's judo
Representing Germany
Olympic Games
Bronze medal – third place	2020 Tokyo	Mixed team
European Games
Bronze medal – third place	2015 Baku	‍–‍66 kg
IJF Grand Slam
Bronze medal – third place	2014 Abu Dhabi	‍–‍66 kg
Bronze medal – third place	2018 Paris	‍–‍66 kg
IJF Grand Prix
Silver medal – second place	2014 Qingdao	‍–‍66 kg
Silver medal – second place	2015 Zagreb	‍–‍66 kg
Silver medal – second place	2015 Budapest	‍–‍66 kg
Bronze medal – third place	2014 Astana	‍–‍66 kg
Bronze medal – third place	2018 The Hague	‍–‍66 kg
Bronze medal – third place	2019 Marrakesh	‍–‍66 kg

Profile at external databases
- IJF: 1245
- JudoInside.com: 37365
- Updated on 14 November 2022

Sebastian Seidl (born 12 July 1990 in Nürtingen) is a German judoka. He competed at the 2016 Summer Olympics in the men's 66 kg event, in which he was eliminated in the second round by Fabio Basile. He also competed in the men's 66 kg event at the 2020 Summer Olympics in Tokyo, Japan.
