= Georgii Zantaraia =

Ukrainian judoka (born 1987)

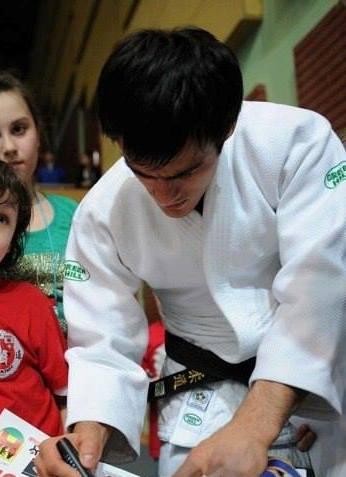

Personal information
- Native name: გიორგი ზანთარაია
- Citizenship: Ukraine
- Born: 21 October 1987 (age 38) Gali, Georgian SSR, Soviet Union
- Home town: Kyiv, Ukraine
- Occupation: Judoka
- Height: 1.72 m (5 ft 8 in)

Sport
- Country: Ukraine
- Sport: Judo
- Weight class: ‍–‍66 kg
- Coached by: V. M. Briman, V. V. Dubrova

Achievements and titles
- Olympic Games: R16 (2020)
- World Champ.: (2009)
- European Champ.: (gold) (2011, 2017, 2019)
Medal record
Men's judo
Representing Ukraine
World Championships
Gold medal – first place	2009 Rotterdam	‍–‍60 kg
Silver medal – second place	2010 Tokyo	‍–‍60 kg
Bronze medal – third place	2011 Paris	‍–‍60 kg
Bronze medal – third place	2013 Rio de Janeiro	‍–‍66 kg
Bronze medal – third place	2014 Chelyabinsk	‍–‍66 kg
Bronze medal – third place	2018 Baku	‍–‍66 kg
European Games
Gold medal – first place	2019 Minsk	‍–‍66 kg
Bronze medal – third place	2015 Baku	Men's team
European Championships
Gold medal – first place	2011 Istanbul	‍–‍60 kg
Gold medal – first place	2017 Warsaw	‍–‍66 kg
Silver medal – second place	2009 Tbilisi	‍–‍60 kg
World Masters
Gold medal – first place	2015 Rabat	‍–‍66 kg
IJF Grand Slam
Silver medal – second place	2014 Paris	‍–‍66 kg
Silver medal – second place	2015 Paris	‍–‍66 kg
Silver medal – second place	2018 Düsseldorf	‍–‍66 kg
Bronze medal – third place	2011 Paris	‍–‍60 kg
Bronze medal – third place	2015 Abu Dhabi	‍–‍66 kg
Bronze medal – third place	2019 Paris	‍–‍66 kg
Bronze medal – third place	2020 Paris	‍–‍66 kg
IJF Grand Prix
Gold medal – first place	2009 Abu Dhabi	‍–‍60 kg
Gold medal – first place	2010 Düsseldorf	‍–‍60 kg
Gold medal – first place	2011 Qingdao	‍–‍60 kg
Gold medal – first place	2013 Samsun	‍–‍66 kg
Gold medal – first place	2015 Zagreb	‍–‍66 kg
Silver medal – second place	2014 Tbilisi	‍–‍66 kg
Silver medal – second place	2017 Hohhot	‍–‍66 kg
Silver medal – second place	2018 Zagreb	‍–‍66 kg
Bronze medal – third place	2010 Tunis	‍–‍60 kg
Bronze medal – third place	2011 Baku	‍–‍60 kg
Bronze medal – third place	2013 Jeju	‍–‍66 kg
Bronze medal – third place	2014 Budapest	‍–‍66 kg
Bronze medal – third place	2015 Tbilisi	‍–‍66 kg
European U23 Championships
Bronze medal – third place	2007 Salzburg	‍–‍60 kg
Bronze medal – third place	2008 Zagreb	‍–‍60 kg
European Junior Championships
Gold medal – first place	2006 Tallinn	‍–‍60 kg

Profile at external databases
- IJF: 560
- JudoInside.com: 25753
- Updated on 23 May 2023

Georgii Zantaraia (Georgian: გიორგი ზანთარაია, romanized: giorgi zantaraia; Ukrainian: Георгій Малхазович Зантарая; born 21 October 1987), also known as Heorhiy Zantaraia, is a Georgian-born Ukrainian judoka.

Zantaraia is a candidate for the Kyiv City Council of the party Servant of the People in the 2020 Kyiv local election set for 25 October 2020.

== Career ==
Zantaraia became World Champion in the −60 kg division at the 2009 World Judo Championships in Rotterdam. That same year he won the silver medal at the 2009 European Judo Championships in Tbilisi, being beaten by Russia's Arsen Galstyan in the final.

In 2010 Zantaraia won the silver medal at the 2010 World Judo Championships in Tokyo, unable to defend his title against Uzbekistan's Rishod Sobirov who would retain his title in 2011, while Zantaraia claimed the bronze that year in Paris. Zantaraia would however win his first European title at the 2011 European Judo Championships in Istanbul, beating in the final Betkil Shukvani, who at the time (and until 2015) represented Georgia. In 2013 Zantaraia won another bronze medal at the 2013 World Judo Championships in Rio de Janeiro.

He competed in the men's 66 kg event at the 2020 Summer Olympics in Tokyo, Japan.
