= 2017 World Judo Championships – Men's 90 kg =

Judo competition

Judo Men's 90 kg at the 2017 World Judo Championships
- Venue: László Papp Budapest Sports Arena
- Location: Budapest, Hungary
- Dates: 1 September
- Competitors: 72 from 56 nations
- Total prize money: 57,000$

Medalists
gold medal	Nemanja Majdov (1st title)	Serbia
silver medal	Mihael Žgank	Slovenia
bronze medal	Gwak Dong-han	South Korea
bronze medal	Ushangi Margiani	Georgia

Competition at external databases
- Links: IJF • JudoInside

The Men's 90 kg competition at the 2017 World Judo Championships was held on 1 September 2017.

== Results ==
=== Finals ===
Semi-finals
(Serbia) Aleksandar Kukolj	00
(Slovenia) Mihael Žgank	01
(Serbia) Nemanja Majdov	01
(Hungary) Krisztián Tóth	00

Final
(Slovenia) Mihael Žgank	00
(Serbia) Nemanja Majdov	00

=== Repechage ===
Repechage
(Mongolia) Gantulga Altanbagana	00
(South Korea) Gwak Dong-han	02

Third place
(South Korea) Gwak Dong-han	01
(Hungary) Krisztián Tóth	00

Repechage
(Georgia (country)) Ushangi Margiani	02
(Azerbaijan) Mammadali Mehdiyev	00

Third place
(Georgia (country)) Ushangi Margiani	02
(Serbia) Aleksandar Kukolj	00

=== Pool A ===
First round fights

	Score	
Rijad Dedeić (Bosnia and Herzegovina)	00–01	(Uzbekistan) Shakhzodbek Sabirov
Yahor Varapayeu (Belarus)	10–00	(Turkey) Batuhan Efemgil

Second round
(Iceland) Egill Blöndal	00
(Poland) Piotr Kuczera	11
(Peru) José Arroyo	00
(Azerbaijan) Tural Safguliyev	10
(United Kingdom) Max Stewart	00
(Uzbekistan) Shakhzodbek Sabirov	01
(Mongolia) Gantulga Altanbagana	01
(Belarus) Yahor Varapayeu	00
(Senegal) Baye Diawara	00
(Switzerland) Ciril Grossklaus	11
(China) Wang Wei	00
(Germany) David Tekic	11
(Mexico) Víctor Ochoa	02
(Jordan) Eiyal Hamad	00

Third round
(Serbia) Aleksandar Kukolj	01
(Poland) Piotr Kuczera	00
(Azerbaijan) Tural Safguliyev	03
(Uzbekistan) Shakhzodbek Sabirov	01
(Mongolia) Gantulga Altanbagana	00
(Switzerland) Ciril Grossklaus	00
(Germany) David Tekic	01
(Mexico) Víctor Ochoa	00

Fourth round
(Serbia) Aleksandar Kukolj	10
(Azerbaijan) Tural Safguliyev	00
(Mongolia) Gantulga Altanbagana	11
(Germany) David Tekic	00

Quarterfinals
(Serbia) Aleksandar Kukolj	01
(Mongolia) Gantulga Altanbagana	00

=== Pool B ===
First round fights

	Score	
Azamat Bektursunov (Kyrgyzstan)	10–00	(Philippines) Kohei Kohagura
Iniki Uera (Nauru)	00–10	(Slovakia) Peter Žilka

Second round
(Russia) Khusen Khalmurzaev	10
(Gabon) Paul Kibikai	00
(Cuba) Iván Silva	01
(Hungary) Gábor Vér	00
(Estonia) Klen Kaljulaid	00
(Slovenia) Mihael Žgank	10
(Georgia (country)) Beka Gviniashvili	10
(Kyrgyzstan) Azamat Bektursunov	00
(South Korea) Gwak Dong-han	01
(Romania) Mark Stoica	00
(Montenegro) Marko Bubanja	00
(United States) Colton Brown	10
(Slovakia) Peter Žilka	01
(Finland) Jaakko Alli	00
(Lebanon) Nacif Elias	01
(Canada) Louis Krieber	00

Third round
(Russia) Khusen Khalmurzaev	01
(Cuba) Iván Silva	00
(Slovenia) Mihael Žgank	10
(Georgia (country)) Beka Gviniashvili	00
(South Korea) Gwak Dong-han	01
(United States) Colton Brown	00
(Slovakia) Peter Žilka	00
(Lebanon) Nacif Elias	01

Fourth round
(Russia) Khusen Khalmurzaev	00
(Slovenia) Mihael Žgank	01
(South Korea) Gwak Dong-han	00
(Lebanon) Nacif Elias	00

Quarterfinals
(Slovenia) Mihael Žgank	01
(South Korea) Gwak Dong-han	00

=== Pool C ===
First round fights

	Score	
Bachirou Doubou (Niger)	00–10	(South Korea) Lee Jae-yong
Asley González (Cuba)	00–10	(Serbia) Nemanja Majdov

Second round
(France) Axel Clerget	10
(Australia) Sebastian Temesi	00
(United Arab Emirates) Mihail Marchitan	00
(Czech Republic) David Klammert	10
(Bosnia and Herzegovina) Toni Miletić	00
(Georgia (country)) Ushangi Margiani	01
(Algeria) Abderrahmane Benamadi	01
(South Korea) Lee Jae-yong	00
(Kazakhstan) Islam Bozbayev	00
(Serbia) Nemanja Majdov	10
(Benin) Celtus Dossou	00
(Democratic Republic of the Congo) Eyale Le Beau	03
(Canada) Zachary Burt	11
(Finland) Samuli Viitanen	00
(Portugal) Célio Dias	13
(Estonia) Mattias Kuusik	00

Third round
(France) Axel Clerget	00
(Czech Republic) David Klammert	01
(Georgia (country)) Ushangi Margiani	02
(Algeria) Abderrahmane Benamadi	01
(Serbia) Nemanja Majdov	10
(Democratic Republic of the Congo) Eyale Le Beau	00
(Canada) Zachary Burt	00
(Portugal) Célio Dias	01

Fourth round
(Czech Republic) David Klammert	00
(Georgia (country)) Ushangi Margiani	01
(Serbia) Nemanja Majdov	10
(Portugal) Célio Dias	01

Quarterfinals
(Georgia (country)) Ushangi Margiani	00
(Serbia) Nemanja Majdov	01

=== Pool D ===
First round fights

	Score	
Krisztián Tóth (Hungary)	01–00	(Dominican Republic) Robert Florentino
Cristian Bodîrlău (Romania)	00–01	(Azerbaijan) Mammadali Mehdiyev

Second round
(Tajikistan) Komronshokh Ustopiriyon	00
(Hungary) Krisztián Tóth	01
(Seychelles) Nantenaina Finesse	00
(United States) Matthew Koch	10
(Ghana) Victor Ahiavor	00
(Egypt) Hatem Abd el Akher	11
(Kyrgyzstan) Faruch Bulekulov	00
(Uzbekistan) Yakhyo Imamov	10
(Spain) Nikoloz Sherazadishvili	12
(Argentina) Tomas Spikermann	00
(Germany) Marc Odenthal	11
(India) Avtar Singh	00
(Azerbaijan) Mammadali Mehdiyev	10
(Ukraine) Quedjau Nhabali	00
(Kenya) John Kirimi	00
(Tunisia) Oussama Snoussi	12

Third round
(Hungary) Krisztián Tóth	01
(United States) Matthew Koch	00
(Egypt) Hatem Abd el Akher	00
(Uzbekistan) Yakhyo Imamov	01
(Spain) Nikoloz Sherazadishvili	12
(Germany) Marc Odenthal	00
(Azerbaijan) Mammadali Mehdiyev	01
(Tunisia) Oussama Snoussi	00

Fourth round
(Hungary) Krisztián Tóth	01
(Uzbekistan) Yakhyo Imamov	00
(Spain) Nikoloz Sherazadishvili	01
(Azerbaijan) Mammadali Mehdiyev	02

Quarterfinals
(Hungary) Krisztián Tóth	01
(Azerbaijan) Mammadali Mehdiyev	00

== Prize money ==
The sums listed bring the total prizes awarded to 57,000$ for the individual event.

Medal	Total	Judoka	Coach
Gold	26,000$	20,800$	5,200$
Silver	15,000$	12,000$	3,000$
Bronze	8,000$	6,400$	1,600$
