= Tancontian =

Tancontian is a surname. Notable people with the surname include:

- Chino Sy Tancontian (born 2000), Filipino sambist, judoka and freestyle wrestler
- Sydney Sy Tancontian (born 1999), Filipino sambist, judoka and kurash wrestler
