= Anna-Maria Manusheva =

Bulgarian sambo practitioner and judoka (born 2001)

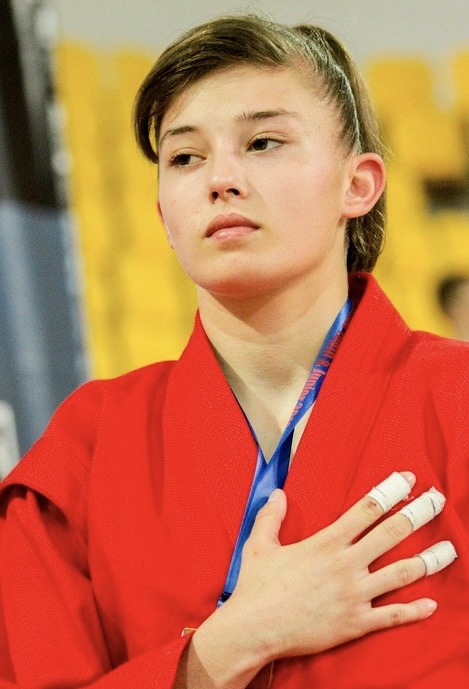

Personal information
- Born: 28 August 2001 (age 24) Troyan, Bulgaria

Sport
- Sport: Sambo, judo
Medal record
Representing Bulgaria
Women's sambo
World Championships
Bronze medal – third place	2019 Seoul	60 kg
Bronze medal – third place	2023 Yerevan	65 kg

Anna-Maria Manusheva (Bulgarian: Анна-Мария Манушева; born 28 August 2001) is a Bulgarian athlete, known for her achievements in judo and sambo. She has been an active member of the national sambo team since 2017.

== Biography ==
Anna-Maria Manusheva was born on 28 August 2001, in the town of Troyan. She began her sporting career in her hometown, where she trained at the "Chavdar" sports club under the guidance of coach Nikolay Matev. Then she went to the National Sports Academy "Vasil Levski" in Sofia.

== Sporting career ==
In 2019, Manusheva won a bronze medal at the World Youth and Junior Sambo Championships, in the 60 kg category. She also had the same result at the 2019 World Championships. In 2023, she won a bronze medal at the Sambo World Cup. In the same year, she also achieved the same position at World Sambo Championships held in Yerevan, Armenia.
