= 2016 European Judo Championships – Men's 90 kg =

Judo Men's 90 kg at the 2016 European Judo Championships
- Venue: TatNeft Arena
- Location: Kazan, Russia
- Date: 23 April
- Competitors: 35 from 25 nations

Medalists
gold medal	Varlam Liparteliani (3rd title)	Georgia
silver medal	Krisztián Tóth	Hungary
bronze medal	Marcus Nyman	Sweden
bronze medal	Piotr Kuczera	Poland

Competition at external databases
- Links: IJF • JudoInside

The men's 90 kg competition at the 2016 European Judo Championships was held on 23 April at the TatNeft Arena, in Kazan, Russia.

== Results ==
=== Finals ===
Semi-finals
Varlam Liparteliani (GEO)	10
Piotr Kuczera (POL)	00
Krisztián Tóth (HUN)	10
Alexandre Iddir (FRA)	00

Final
Varlam Liparteliani (GEO)	10
Krisztián Tóth (HUN)	00

=== Repechage ===
Repechage
Quedjau Nhabali (UKR)	00
Marcus Nyman (SWE)	10

Third place
Marcus Nyman (SWE)	10
Alexandre Iddir (FRA)	00

Repechage
Karolis Bauža (LTU)	00
Aleksandar Kukolj (SRB)	11

Third place
Aleksandar Kukolj (SRB)	00
Piotr Kuczera (POL)	10

=== Pool A ===
First round
Andrew Burns (GBR)	00
Milan Randl (SVK)	10

Round of 32
Varlam Liparteliani (GEO)	01
Milan Randl (SVK)	00
Mihael Žgank (SLO)	10
Aigars Mīlenbergs (LAT)	00
Ciril Grossklaus (SUI)	01
Gábor Vér (HUN)	00
Mammadali Mehdiyev (AZE)	00
Quedjau Nhabali (UKR)	00

Round of 16
Varlam Liparteliani (GEO)	00
Mihael Žgank (SLO)	00
Ciril Grossklaus (SUI)	00
Quedjau Nhabali (UKR)	01

Quarterfinals
Varlam Liparteliani (GEO)	10
Quedjau Nhabali (UKR)	00

=== Pool B ===
First round

Round of 32
Ilias Iliadis (GRE)	10
Marko Bubanja (MNE)	00
Piotr Kuczera (POL)	01
Axel Clerget (FRA)	00
Marcus Nyman (SWE)	10
David Ruíz Zajac (ESP)	00
Dmitrij Gerasimenko (SRB)	01
Aaron Hildebrand (GER)	00

Round of 16
Ilias Iliadis (GRE)	00
Piotr Kuczera (POL)	10
Marcus Nyman (SWE)	10
Dmitrij Gerasimenko (SRB)	00

Quarterfinals
Piotr Kuczera (POL)	11
Marcus Nyman (SWE)	00

=== Pool C ===
First round
Samuli Viitanen (FIN)	10
Nikoloz Sherazadishvili (ESP)	01

Round of 32
Krisztián Tóth (HUN)	01
Samuli Viitanen (FIN)	00
Tiago Rodrigues (POR)	00
Patryk Ciechomski (POL)	00
Joakim Dvärby (SWE)	00
Karolis Bauža (LTU)	10
Peter Žilka (SVK)	00
Frazer Chamberlain (GBR)	10

Round of 16
Krisztián Tóth (HUN)	01
Patryk Ciechomski (POL)	00
Karolis Bauža (LTU)	10
Frazer Chamberlain (GBR)	00

Quarterfinals
Krisztián Tóth (HUN)	00
Karolis Bauža (LTU)	00

=== Pool D ===
First round
Marc Odenthal (GER)	00
Li Kochman (ISR)	10

Round of 32
Alexandre Iddir (FRA)	10
Li Kochman (ISR)	00
Ihar Zhukau (BLR)	00
Magomed Magomedov (RUS)	10
Aleksandar Kukolj (SRB)	00
David Klammert (CZE)	00
Vadym Synyavsky (UKR)	00
Aleksandr Marmeljuk (EST)	10

Round of 16
Alexandre Iddir (FRA)	00
Magomed Magomedov (RUS)	00
Aleksandar Kukolj (SRB)	10
Aleksandr Marmeljuk (EST)	00

Quarterfinals
Alexandre Iddir (FRA)	00
Aleksandar Kukolj (SRB)	00
