= Oganisyan =

Oganisyan is a surname. Notable people with the surname include:

- David Oganisyan (born 1994), Russian sambo and judo practitioner
- Sanasar Oganisyan (born 1956), Soviet Armenian sport wrestler
