= 2021 European Judo Championships – Men's 90 kg =

Judo Men's 90 kg at the 2021 European Judo Championships
- Venue: Altice Arena
- Location: Lisbon, Portugal
- Date: 18 April
- Competitors: 33 from 25 nations

Medalists
gold medal	Lasha Bekauri (1st title)	Georgia
silver medal	Beka Gviniashvili	Georgia
bronze medal	Mikhail Igolnikov	Russia
bronze medal	Krisztián Tóth	Hungary

Competition at external databases
- Links: IJF • JudoInside

The men's 90 kg competition at the 2021 European Judo Championships was held on 18 April at the Altice Arena.

== Results ==
=== Finals ===
Semifinals
Mihael Žgank (TUR)	00
Lasha Bekauri (GEO)	01
Mikhail Igolnikov (RUS)	00
Beka Gviniashvili (GEO)	11

Final
Lasha Bekauri (GEO)	10
Beka Gviniashvili (GEO)	00

=== Repechage ===
Repechage
Jesper Smink (NED)	00
Nemanja Majdov (SRB)	01

Third place
Nemanja Majdov (SRB)	00
Mikhail Igolnikov (RUS)	10

Repechage
Noël van 't End (NED)	00
Krisztián Tóth (HUN)	10

Third place
Krisztián Tóth (HUN)	01
Mihael Žgank (TUR)	00

=== Pool A ===
Round of 64
Raphael Schwendinger (LIE)	00
Mattias Kuusik (EST)	10

Round of 32
Nikoloz Sherazadishvili (ESP)	00
Jesper Smink (NED)	01
Narsej Lackovič (SLO)	10
Paolo Persoglia (SMR)	00
Mihael Žgank (TUR)	10
Sebastian Ołdak (POL)	00
Mattias Kuusik (EST)	00
Peter Žilka (SVK)	01

Round of 16
Jesper Smink (NED)	11
Narsej Lackovič (SLO)	00
Mihael Žgank (TUR)	10
Peter Žilka (SVK)	00

Quarterfinals
Jesper Smink (NED)	00
Mihael Žgank (TUR)	10

=== Pool B ===
Round of 64

Round of 32
Lasha Bekauri (GEO)	10
Alexis Mathieu (FRA)	00
Li Kochman (ISR)	10
Roland Gőz (HUN)	00
Nemanja Majdov (SRB)	10
Martin Matijass (GER)	00
David Klammert (CZE)	00
Marcus Nyman (SWE)	10

Round of 16
Lasha Bekauri (GEO)	10
Li Kochman (ISR)	00
Nemanja Majdov (SRB)	01
Marcus Nyman (SWE)	00

Quarterfinals
Lasha Bekauri (GEO)	10
Nemanja Majdov (SRB)	00

=== Pool C ===
Round of 64

Round of 32
Noël van 't End (NED)	10
Piotr Kuczera (POL)	00
Ciril Grossklaus (SUI)	11
Toni Miletić (BIH)	00
Mikhail Igolnikov (RUS)	10
Theodoros Tselidis (GRE)	00
Milan Randl (SVK)	01
Egill Blöndal (ISL)	00

Round of 16
Noël van 't End (NED)	10
Ciril Grossklaus (SUI)	00
Mikhail Igolnikov (RUS)	10
Milan Randl (SVK)	00

Quarterfinals
Noël van 't End (NED)	00
Mikhail Igolnikov (RUS)	10

=== Pool D ===
Round of 64

Round of 32
Krisztián Tóth (HUN)	01
Falk Petersilka (GER)	00
Nicholas Mungai (ITA)	10
Boško Borenović (SRB)	00
Beka Gviniashvili (GEO)	11
Klen-Kristofer Kaljulaid (EST)	00
Alex Creţ (ROU)	10
Aleksejs Zarudņevs (LAT)	00

Round of 16
Krisztián Tóth (HUN)	10
Nicholas Mungai (ITA)	00
Beka Gviniashvili (GEO)	10
Alex Creţ (ROU)	00

Quarterfinals
Krisztián Tóth (HUN)	00
Beka Gviniashvili (GEO)	11
