= Judo at the 2015 Pan American Games – Men's 81 kg =

Men's 81 kg at the 2015 Pan American Games
- Venue: Mississauga Sports Centre
- Dates: July 13
- Competitors: 10 from 10 nations

Medalists
Gold medal	Travis Stevens	United States
Silver medal	Iván Felipe Silva Morales	Cuba
Bronze medal	Pedro Castro	Colombia
Bronze medal	Victor Penalber	Brazil

The men's 81 kg competition of the judo events at the 2015 Pan American Games in Toronto, Canada, was held on July 13 at the Mississauga Sports Centre.

== Schedule ==
All times are Central Standard Time (UTC-6).

Date	Time	Round
July 13, 2015	15:07	Preliminary bout
July 13, 2015	15:28	Quarterfinals
July 13, 2015	15:49	Repechage
July 13, 2015	17:20	Semifinals
July 13, 2015	20:21	Bronze medal matches
July 13, 2015	20:35	Final

== Results ==
Legend

- 1st number = Ippon
- 2nd number = Waza-ari
- 3rd number = Yuko

=== Bracket ===
Preliminaries
Zachary Burt (CAN)	100S1
Rodrigo Idro (CHI)	000S1
Pedro Castro (COL)	001S3
Juan Diego Turcios (ESA)	000S2

Quarter Finals
Victor Penalber (BRA)	100
Yusef Farah (MEX)	000S1
Ivan Felipe Silva (CUB)	010S1
Zachary Burt (CAN)	000
Travis Stevens (USA)	101
Gadiel Miranda (PUR)	000S2
Emmanuel Lucenti (ARG)	000
Pedro Castro (COL)	000

Semi Finals
Victor Penalber (BRA)	000S2
Ivan Felipe Silva (CUB)	010S2
Travis Stevens (USA)	110
Pedro Castro (COL)	000H

Final
Ivan Felipe Silva (CUB)	000S1
Travis Stevens (USA)	101

=== Repechage round ===
Two bronze medals were awarded.

Repechage		Bronze medal
Yusef Farah (MEX)	000
Zachary Burt (CAN)	100	Zachary Burt (CAN)	000
		Pedro Castro (COL)	010S2

Repechage	Bronze medal
Gadiel Miranda (PUR)
bye	Gadiel Miranda (PUR)	000S1
	Victor Penalber (BRA)	101S1
