= 2009 World Judo Juniors Championships =

Judo competition

Judo 2009 World Judo Juniors Championships
- Location: Paris, France
- Dates: 22–25 October 2009

Competition at external databases
- Links: EJU • JudoInside

The 2009 World Judo Juniors Championships was an edition of the World Judo Juniors Championships, organised by the International Judo Federation. It was held in Paris, France from 22 to 25 October 2009.

== Medal summary ==
=== Men's events ===
Event	Gold	Silver	Bronze
−55 kg	Toru Shishime (JPN)	Ilgar Mushkiyev (AZE)	Huang Sheng-ting (TPE)
−55 kg	Toru Shishime (JPN)	Ilgar Mushkiyev (AZE)	Łukasz Kiełbasiński (POL)
−60 kg	Hirofumi Yamamoto (JPN)	Davaadorjiin Tömörkhüleg (MGL)	Ilyas Izmagilov (KAZ)
−60 kg	Hirofumi Yamamoto (JPN)	Davaadorjiin Tömörkhüleg (MGL)	Florent Urani (FRA)
−66 kg	Junpei Morishita (JPN)	Grzegorz Lewinski (POL)	Zsolt Gorjánácz (HUN)
−66 kg	Junpei Morishita (JPN)	Grzegorz Lewinski (POL)	Kenneth Van Gansbeke (BEL)
−73 kg	Yuki Nishiyama (JPN)	Vitalii Popovych (UKR)	Thibault Dracius (FRA)
−73 kg	Yuki Nishiyama (JPN)	Vitalii Popovych (UKR)	Lasha Zurabiani (GEO)
−81 kg	Loïc Pietri (FRA)	Magomed Magomedov (RUS)	Yannick Gutsche (GER)
−81 kg	Loïc Pietri (FRA)	Magomed Magomedov (RUS)	Tomohiro Kawakami (JPN)
−90 kg	Quedjau Nhabali (UKR)	Archil Shinjikashvili (GEO)	Grigori Minaškin (EST)
−90 kg	Quedjau Nhabali (UKR)	Archil Shinjikashvili (GEO)	Daiki Nishiyama (JPN)
−100 kg	Lukáš Krpálek (CZE)	Tomasz Domanski (POL)	Tobias Mol (NED)
−100 kg	Lukáš Krpálek (CZE)	Tomasz Domanski (POL)	Alejandro San Martín (ESP)
+100 kg	Cho Eun-saem (KOR)	Magomed Nazhmudinov (RUS)	André Breitbarth (GER)
+100 kg	Cho Eun-saem (KOR)	Magomed Nazhmudinov (RUS)	Domenico Di Guida (ITA)

Source Results

=== Women's events ===
Event	Gold	Silver	Bronze
−44 kg	Tomoka Yomogita (JPN)	Katharina Menz (GER)	Antonieta Galleguillos (CHI)
−44 kg	Tomoka Yomogita (JPN)	Katharina Menz (GER)	Ebru Şahin (TUR)
−48 kg	Sarah Menezes (BRA)	Hiromi Endō (JPN)	Derya Cıbır (TUR)
−48 kg	Sarah Menezes (BRA)	Hiromi Endō (JPN)	Kim Mi-ri (KOR)
−52 kg	Majlinda Kelmendi (ALB)	Shahar Levy (ISR)	Chiho Kagaya (JPN)
−52 kg	Majlinda Kelmendi (ALB)	Shahar Levy (ISR)	Tuğba Zehir (TUR)
−57 kg	Hedvig Karakas (HUN)	Juul Franssen (NED)	Tina Trstenjak (SLO)
−57 kg	Hedvig Karakas (HUN)	Juul Franssen (NED)	Aiko Uryu (JPN)
−63 kg	Sayuri Yamamoto (JPN)	Song Sea-rom (KOR)	Vlora Beđeti (SLO)
−63 kg	Sayuri Yamamoto (JPN)	Song Sea-rom (KOR)	Mariana Silva (BRA)
−70 kg	Haruka Tachimoto (JPN)	Lucie Perrot (FRA)	Daria Davydova (RUS)
−70 kg	Haruka Tachimoto (JPN)	Lucie Perrot (FRA)	Abigél Joó (HUN)
−78 kg	Akari Ogata (JPN)	Kayla Harrison (USA)	Mayra Aguiar (BRA)
−78 kg	Akari Ogata (JPN)	Kayla Harrison (USA)	Luise Malzahn (GER)
+78 kg	Larisa Cerić (BIH)	Iryna Kindzerska (UKR)	Sandra Jablonskytė (LTU)
+78 kg	Larisa Cerić (BIH)	Iryna Kindzerska (UKR)	Kanae Yamabe (JPN)

Source Results

=== Medal table ===
* Host nation (France)

Rank	Nation	Gold	Silver	Bronze	Total
1	Japan (JPN)	8	1	5	14
2	Ukraine (UKR)	1	2	0	3
3	France (FRA)*	1	1	2	4
4	South Korea (KOR)	1	1	1	3
5	Brazil (BRA)	1	0	2	3
5	Hungary (HUN)	1	0	2	3
7	Albania (ALB)	1	0	0	1
7	Bosnia and Herzegovina (BIH)	1	0	0	1
7	Czech Republic (CZE)	1	0	0	1
10	Poland (POL)	0	2	1	3
10	Russia (RUS)	0	2	1	3
12	Germany (GER)	0	1	3	4
13	Georgia (GEO)	0	1	1	2
13	Netherlands (NED)	0	1	1	2
15	Azerbaijan (AZE)	0	1	0	1
15	Israel (ISR)	0	1	0	1
15	Mongolia (MGL)	0	1	0	1
15	United States (USA)	0	1	0	1
19	Turkey (TUR)	0	0	3	3
20	Slovenia (SLO)	0	0	2	2
21	Belgium (BEL)	0	0	1	1
21	Chile (CHI)	0	0	1	1
21	Chinese Taipei (TPE)	0	0	1	1
21	Estonia (EST)	0	0	1	1
21	Italy (ITA)	0	0	1	1
21	Kazakhstan (KAZ)	0	0	1	1
21	Lithuania (LTU)	0	0	1	1
21	Spain (ESP)	0	0	1	1
Totals (28 entries)		16	16	32	64
