= Yakhyo Imamov =

Uzbekistani judoka (born 1989)

Personal information
- Born: 24 December 1989 (age 36) Samarqand Province
- Occupation: Judoka

Sport
- Country: Uzbekistan
- Sport: Judo
- Weight class: ‍–‍81 kg, ‍–‍90 kg

Achievements and titles
- Olympic Games: R32 (2012)
- World Champ.: R16 (2015, 2017)
- Asian Champ.: (bronze) (2012)
Medal record
Men's judo
Representing Uzbekistan
Asian Games
Bronze medal – third place	2014 Incheon	Men's team
Asian Championships
Bronze medal – third place	2012 Tashkent	‍–‍81 kg
IJF Grand Slam
Gold medal – first place	2013 Paris	‍–‍81 kg
Silver medal – second place	2012 Moscow	‍–‍81 kg
IJF Grand Prix
Gold medal – first place	2015 Budapest	‍–‍81 kg
Gold medal – first place	2016 Tashkent	‍–‍90 kg
Silver medal – second place	2014 Tashkent	‍–‍81 kg
Bronze medal – third place	2013 Tashkent	‍–‍81 kg
Bronze medal – third place	2013 Abu Dhabi	‍–‍81 kg
Bronze medal – third place	2017 Tashkent	‍–‍90 kg
Summer Universiade
Silver medal – second place	2013 Kazan	‍–‍81 kg

Profile at external databases
- IJF: 6989
- JudoInside.com: 55568
- Updated on 27 November 2022

Yakhyo Imamov (born 24 December 1989 in Samarqand Province) is an Uzbekistani judoka. He competed in the men's 81 kg event at the 2012 Summer Olympics and was eliminated in the second round by Kim Jae-bum.
