= Ushangi Margiani =

Georgian judoka (born 1994)

Personal information
- Nationality: Georgian
- Born: 28 January 1994 (age 32)
- Occupation: Judoka

Sport
- Country: Georgia
- Sport: Judo
- Weight class: –90 kg

Achievements and titles
- World Champ.: (bronze) (2017)
- European Champ.: R16 (2015, 2018)
Medal record
Men's judo
Representing Georgia
World Championships
Bronze medal – third place	2017 Budapest	‍–‍90 kg
European Games
Silver medal – second place	2015 Baku	Men's team
European Championships
Gold medal – first place	2014 Montpellier	Men's team
Gold medal – first place	2016 Kazan	Men's team
IJF Grand Slam
Silver medal – second place	2014 Baku	‍–‍81 kg
Silver medal – second place	2015 Baku	‍–‍81 kg
Bronze medal – third place	2017 Baku	‍–‍90 kg
Bronze medal – third place	2017 Tokyo	‍–‍90 kg
IJF Grand Prix
Silver medal – second place	2015 Tbilisi	‍–‍81 kg
Silver medal – second place	2018 Budapest	‍–‍90 kg
Bronze medal – third place	2014 Tbilisi	‍–‍81 kg
Bronze medal – third place	2015 Samsun	‍–‍81 kg
Bronze medal – third place	2017 Tbilisi	‍–‍90 kg
European Junior Championships
Silver medal – second place	2014 Bucharest	‍–‍81 kg

Profile at external databases
- IJF: 15017
- JudoInside.com: 89644
- Updated on 26 June 2023

Ushangi Margiani (born 28 January 1994) is a Georgian judoka. He won a bronze medal in the men's 90 kg event at the 2017 World Judo Championships held in Budapest, Hungary.
