= 2012 Judo Grand Prix Abu Dhabi =

Judo competition

Judo 2012 Judo Grand Prix Abu Dhabi
- Location: Abu Dhabi, United Arab Emirates
- Dates: 11–13 October 2012
- Competitors: 139 from 27 nations

Competition at external databases
- Links: IJF • JudoInside

The 2012 Judo Grand Prix Abu Dhabi was held in Abu Dhabi, United Arab Emirates from 11 to 13 October 2012.

== Medal summary ==
=== Men's events ===
Event	Gold	Silver	Bronze
Extra-lightweight (−60 kg)	Beslan Mudranov (RUS)	Amiran Papinashvili (GEO)	Dashdavaagiin Amartüvshin (MGL)
Extra-lightweight (−60 kg)	Beslan Mudranov (RUS)	Amiran Papinashvili (GEO)	Diego Dos Santos (BRA)
Half-lightweight (−66 kg)	Nijat Shikhalizada (AZE)	Rishod Sobirov (UZB)	Masashi Kodera (JPN)
Half-lightweight (−66 kg)	Nijat Shikhalizada (AZE)	Rishod Sobirov (UZB)	Shogo Maeno (JPN)
Lightweight (−73 kg)	Murat Kodzokov (RUS)	Miklós Ungvári (HUN)	Ganbaataryn Odbayar (MGL)
Lightweight (−73 kg)	Murat Kodzokov (RUS)	Miklós Ungvári (HUN)	Takenori Nakamura (JPN)
Half-middleweight (−81 kg)	Victor Penalber (BRA)	Sirazhudin Magomedov (RUS)	Tural Safguliyev (AZE)
Half-middleweight (−81 kg)	Victor Penalber (BRA)	Sirazhudin Magomedov (RUS)	Sergiu Toma (MDA)
Middleweight (−90 kg)	Kirill Voprosov (RUS)	Sherali Juraev (UZB)	Dilshod Choriev (UZB)
Middleweight (−90 kg)	Kirill Voprosov (RUS)	Sherali Juraev (UZB)	Zviad Gogotchuri (GEO)
Half-heavyweight (−100 kg)	Sergei Samoilovich (RUS)	Ramziddin Sayidov (UZB)	Daisuke Kobayashi (JPN)
Half-heavyweight (−100 kg)	Sergei Samoilovich (RUS)	Ramziddin Sayidov (UZB)	Utkir Kurbanov (UZB)
Heavyweight (+100 kg)	Masaru Momose (JPN)	David Moura (BRA)	Kakajan Meredov (TKM)
Heavyweight (+100 kg)	Masaru Momose (JPN)	David Moura (BRA)	Adiljan Tulendibaev (UZB)

=== Women's events ===
Event	Gold	Silver	Bronze
Extra-lightweight (−48 kg)	Gabriela Chibana (BRA)	Amélie Rosseneu (BEL)	Otgontsetseg Galbadrakh (MGL)
Extra-lightweight (−48 kg)	Gabriela Chibana (BRA)	Amélie Rosseneu (BEL)	Taciana Cesar (BRA)
Half-lightweight (−52 kg)	Majlinda Kelmendi (KOS)	Érika Miranda (BRA)	Ilse Heylen (BEL)
Half-lightweight (−52 kg)	Majlinda Kelmendi (KOS)	Érika Miranda (BRA)	Eleudis Valentim (BRA)
Lightweight (−57 kg)	Hélène Receveaux (FRA)	Tina Zeltner (AUT)	Nora Gjakova (KOS)
Lightweight (−57 kg)	Hélène Receveaux (FRA)	Tina Zeltner (AUT)	Ketleyn Quadros (BRA)
Half-middleweight (−63 kg)	Kathrin Unterwurzacher (AUT)	Maelle Di Cintio (FRA)	Baldorjyn Möngönchimeg (MGL)
Half-middleweight (−63 kg)	Kathrin Unterwurzacher (AUT)	Maelle Di Cintio (FRA)	Anna Bernholm (SWE)
Middleweight (−70 kg)	Maria Portela (BRA)	Bernadette Graf (AUT)	Fanny Estelle Posvite (FRA)
Middleweight (−70 kg)	Maria Portela (BRA)	Bernadette Graf (AUT)	Caren Chammas (LBN)
Half-heavyweight (−78 kg)	Catherine Roberge (CAN)	Natalie Powell (GBR)	Habiba Almismary (UAE)
Half-heavyweight (−78 kg)	Catherine Roberge (CAN)	Natalie Powell (GBR)	Amandah Payet (SEY)
Heavyweight (+78 kg)	Émilie Andéol (FRA)	Maria Suelen Altheman (BRA)	Maryam Albloshi (UAE)
Heavyweight (+78 kg)	Émilie Andéol (FRA)	Maria Suelen Altheman (BRA)	Brigitte Rose (SEY)

Source Results

=== Medal table ===
* Host nation (United Arab Emirates)

Rank	Nation	Gold	Silver	Bronze	Total
1	Russia (RUS)	4	1	0	5
2	Brazil (BRA)	3	3	4	10
3	France (FRA)	2	1	1	4
4	Austria (AUT)	1	2	0	3
5	Japan (JPN)	1	0	4	5
6	Azerbaijan (AZE)	1	0	1	2
6	Kosovo (KOS)	1	0	1	2
8	Canada (CAN)	1	0	0	1
9	Uzbekistan (UZB)	0	3	3	6
10	Belgium (BEL)	0	1	1	2
10	Georgia (GEO)	0	1	1	2
12	Great Britain (GBR)	0	1	0	1
12	Hungary (HUN)	0	1	0	1
14	Mongolia (MGL)	0	0	4	4
15	Seychelles (SEY)	0	0	2	2
15	United Arab Emirates (UAE)*	0	0	2	2
17	Lebanon (LBN)	0	0	1	1
17	Moldova (MDA)	0	0	1	1
17	Sweden (SWE)	0	0	1	1
17	Turkmenistan (TKM)	0	0	1	1
Totals (20 entries)		14	14	28	56
