= 2010 World Judo Juniors Championships =

Judo competition

Judo 2010 World Judo Juniors Championships
- Location: Agadir, Morocco
- Dates: 21–24 October 2010

Competition at external databases
- Links: IJF • EJU • JudoInside

The 2010 World Judo Juniors Championships was an edition of the World Judo Juniors Championships, organised by the International Judo Federation. It was held in Agadir, Morocco from 21 to 24 October 2010.

== Medal summary ==
=== Men's events ===
Event	Gold	Silver	Bronze
−55 kg	Yeldos Smetov (KAZ)	Seiken Fujisawa (JPN)	Fabio Basile (ITA)
−55 kg	Yeldos Smetov (KAZ)	Seiken Fujisawa (JPN)	Zaur Kalashaov (RUS)
−60 kg	Toru Shishime (JPN)	Ilyas Izmagilov (KAZ)	Kyosuke Nishio (JPN)
−60 kg	Toru Shishime (JPN)	Ilyas Izmagilov (KAZ)	Yakub Shamilov (RUS)
−66 kg	Kento Shimizu (JPN)	Nauryzbek Mailashev (KAZ)	Rifat Rakhmatullaev (UZB)
−66 kg	Kento Shimizu (JPN)	Nauryzbek Mailashev (KAZ)	Yuuki Hashiguchi (JPN)
−73 kg	Alexander Wieczerzak (GER)	Hannes Conrad (GER)	Zebeda Rekhviashvili (GEO)
−73 kg	Alexander Wieczerzak (GER)	Hannes Conrad (GER)	Aslan Lappinagov (RUS)
−81 kg	Avtandili Tchrikishvili (GEO)	Yuichi Kitano (JPN)	Krisztián Tóth (HUN)
−81 kg	Avtandili Tchrikishvili (GEO)	Yuichi Kitano (JPN)	Jun Toyoda (JPN)
−90 kg	Magomed Magomedov (RUS)	Hwang Min-ho (KOR)	Shahin Gahramanov (AZE)
−90 kg	Magomed Magomedov (RUS)	Hwang Min-ho (KOR)	Gábor Vér (HUN)
−100 kg	Ryunosuke Haga (JPN)	Kim Young-hun (KOR)	Viktor Demyanenko (KAZ)
−100 kg	Ryunosuke Haga (JPN)	Kim Young-hun (KOR)	Feyyaz Yazıcı (TUR)
+100 kg	Takeshi Ōjitani (JPN)	Wang Hao (CHN)	Roy Meyer (NED)
+100 kg	Takeshi Ōjitani (JPN)	Wang Hao (CHN)	Cho Gu-ham (KOR)

=== Women's events ===
Event	Gold	Silver	Bronze
−44 kg	Sakiho Hamada (JPN)	Agueda Silva (BRA)	Angelina Bombara (ITA)
−44 kg	Sakiho Hamada (JPN)	Agueda Silva (BRA)	Ebru Şahin (TUR)
−48 kg	Miri Toda (JPN)	Momo Tamaoki (JPN)	Nathalia Brigida (BRA)
−48 kg	Miri Toda (JPN)	Momo Tamaoki (JPN)	Scarlett Gabrielli (FRA)
−52 kg	Anzu Yamamoto (JPN)	Eleudis Valentim (BRA)	Priscilla Gneto (FRA)
−52 kg	Anzu Yamamoto (JPN)	Eleudis Valentim (BRA)	Tuğba Zehir (TUR)
−57 kg	Hélène Receveaux (FRA)	Rachelle Plas (FRA)	Ivelina Ilieva (BUL)
−57 kg	Hélène Receveaux (FRA)	Rachelle Plas (FRA)	Terumi Otsuji (JPN)
−63 kg	Miku Takaichi (JPN)	Vlora Beđeti (SLO)	Kathrin Unterwurzacher (AUT)
−63 kg	Miku Takaichi (JPN)	Vlora Beđeti (SLO)	Jialing Zheng (CHN)
−70 kg	Kim Polling (NED)	Natsumi Baba (JPN)	Kim Seong-yeon (KOR)
−70 kg	Kim Polling (NED)	Natsumi Baba (JPN)	Yuri Matsunobu (JPN)
−78 kg	Mayra Aguiar (BRA)	Anamari Velenšek (SLO)	Misaki Shimoda (JPN)
−78 kg	Mayra Aguiar (BRA)	Anamari Velenšek (SLO)	Ivana Maranić (CRO)
+78 kg	Manami Inoue (JPN)	Yan Hao (CHN)	Yasuna Yamamoto (JPN)
+78 kg	Manami Inoue (JPN)	Yan Hao (CHN)	Sonia Asselah (ALG)

Source Results

=== Medal table ===
* Host nation (Morocco)

Rank	Nation	Gold	Silver	Bronze	Total
1	Japan (JPN)	9	4	7	20
2	Brazil (BRA)	1	2	1	4
2	Kazakhstan (KAZ)	1	2	1	4
4	France (FRA)	1	1	2	4
5	Germany (GER)	1	1	0	2
6	Russia (RUS)	1	0	3	4
7	Georgia (GEO)	1	0	1	2
7	Netherlands (NED)	1	0	1	2
9	South Korea (KOR)	0	2	2	4
10	China (CHN)	0	2	1	3
11	Slovenia (SLO)	0	2	0	2
12	Turkey (TUR)	0	0	3	3
13	Hungary (HUN)	0	0	2	2
13	Italy (ITA)	0	0	2	2
15	Algeria (ALG)	0	0	1	1
15	Austria (AUT)	0	0	1	1
15	Azerbaijan (AZE)	0	0	1	1
15	Bulgaria (BUL)	0	0	1	1
15	Croatia (CRO)	0	0	1	1
15	Uzbekistan (UZB)	0	0	1	1
Totals (20 entries)		16	16	32	64
