= Kirill Voprosov =

Russian judoka (born 1986)

Personal information
- Born: 27 March 1986 (age 40)
- Occupation: Judoka

Sport
- Country: Russia
- Sport: Judo
- Weight class: –90 kg

Achievements and titles
- World Champ.: (bronze) (2014)
- European Champ.: (silver) (2014)
Medal record
Men's judo
Representing Russia
World Championships
Bronze medal – third place	2014 Chelyabinsk	‍–‍90 kg
European Championships
Silver medal – second place	2014 Montpellier	‍–‍90 kg
Bronze medal – third place	2013 Budapest	‍–‍90 kg
World Masters
Silver medal – second place	2012 Almaty	‍–‍90 kg
IJF Grand Slam
Bronze medal – third place	2011 Tokyo	‍–‍90 kg
Bronze medal – third place	2014 Abu Dhabi	‍–‍90 kg
IJF Grand Prix
Gold medal – first place	2012 Abu Dhabi	‍–‍90 kg
Silver medal – second place	2011 Baku	‍–‍90 kg
Silver medal – second place	2011 Amsterdam	‍–‍90 kg
Silver medal – second place	2013 Qingdao	‍–‍90 kg
Bronze medal – third place	2010 Rotterdam	‍–‍90 kg
Bronze medal – third place	2014 Havana	‍–‍90 kg
European Junior Championships
Silver medal – second place	2005 Zagreb	‍–‍81 kg
Summer Universiade
Bronze medal – third place	2013 Kazan	‍–‍90 kg

Profile at external databases
- IJF: 2756
- JudoInside.com: 37357
- Updated on 4 July 2023

Kirill Voprosov (born 27 March 1986) is a Russian judoka.

Voprosov won a bronze medal at the 2014 World Judo Championships in Chelyabinsk.
