= Sherali Juraev =

Uzbekistani judoka (born 1986)

Personal information
- Born: 13 December 1986 (age 39)
- Occupation: Judoka

Sport
- Country: Uzbekistan
- Sport: Judo
- Weight class: ‍–‍90 kg, ‍–‍100 kg

Achievements and titles
- Olympic Games: R32 (2016)
- World Champ.: 5th (2014)
- Asian Champ.: (bronze) (2015, 2017, 2018)
Medal record
Men's judo
Representing Uzbekistan
Asian Games
Bronze medal – third place	2018 Jakarta	‍–‍100 kg
Asian Championships
Bronze medal – third place	2015 Kuwait City	‍–‍90 kg
Bronze medal – third place	2017 Hong Kong	‍–‍100 kg
IJF Grand Prix
Gold medal – first place	2013 Tashkent	‍–‍90 kg
Silver medal – second place	2012 Abu Dhabi	‍–‍90 kg
Bronze medal – third place	2012 Baku	‍–‍90 kg
Bronze medal – third place	2015 Samsun	‍–‍90 kg
Bronze medal – third place	2015 Tashkent	‍–‍90 kg
Bronze medal – third place	2017 Tashkent	‍–‍100 kg
Summer Universiade
Silver medal – second place	2011 Shenzhen	‍–‍90 kg

Profile at external databases
- IJF: 7356
- JudoInside.com: 79928
- Updated on 6 December 2022

Sherali Juraev (born 13 December 1986) is an Uzbekistani judoka.

Juraev competed at the 2016 Summer Olympics in Rio de Janeiro, in the men's 90 kg.
