= 2017 Judo Grand Prix Zagreb =

Judo competition

Judo 2017 Judo Grand Prix Zagreb
- Venue: Dom Sportova
- Location: Zagreb, Croatia
- Dates: 29 September – 1 October 2017
- Competitors: 292 from 47 nations

Competition at external databases
- Links: IJF • EJU • JudoInside

The 2017 Judo Grand Prix Zagreb was held at the Dom Sportova in Zagreb, Croatia, from 29 September to 1 October 2017.

== Medal summary ==
=== Men's events ===
Event	Gold	Silver	Bronze
Extra-lightweight (−60 kg)	Amiran Papinashvili (GEO)	Robert Mshvidobadze (RUS)	Bekir Özlü (TUR)
Extra-lightweight (−60 kg)	Amiran Papinashvili (GEO)	Robert Mshvidobadze (RUS)	Albert Oguzov (RUS)
Half-lightweight (−66 kg)	Yuuki Hashiguchi (JPN)	Sergiu Oleinic (POR)	Sinan Sandal (TUR)
Half-lightweight (−66 kg)	Yuuki Hashiguchi (JPN)	Sergiu Oleinic (POR)	Matteo Medves (ITA)
Lightweight (−73 kg)	Rustam Orujov (AZE)	Tommy Macias (SWE)	Uali Kurzhev (RUS)
Lightweight (−73 kg)	Rustam Orujov (AZE)	Tommy Macias (SWE)	Eduardo Barbosa (BRA)
Half-middleweight (−81 kg)	Attila Ungvári (HUN)	Jonathan Allardon (FRA)	Antonio Esposito (ITA)
Half-middleweight (−81 kg)	Attila Ungvári (HUN)	Jonathan Allardon (FRA)	Jack Hatton (USA)
Middleweight (−90 kg)	Krisztián Tóth (HUN)	Rafael Macedo (BRA)	Yūsuke Kobayashi (JPN)
Middleweight (−90 kg)	Krisztián Tóth (HUN)	Rafael Macedo (BRA)	Nicholas Mungai (ITA)
Half-heavyweight (−100 kg)	Miklós Cirjenics (HUN)	Jorge Fonseca (POR)	Giuliano Loporchio (ITA)
Half-heavyweight (−100 kg)	Miklós Cirjenics (HUN)	Jorge Fonseca (POR)	Varlam Liparteliani (GEO)
Heavyweight (+100 kg)	Teddy Riner (FRA)	Stephan Hegyi (AUT)	Vlăduț Simionescu (ROU)
Heavyweight (+100 kg)	Teddy Riner (FRA)	Stephan Hegyi (AUT)	Daiki Kamikawa (JPN)

=== Women's events ===
Event	Gold	Silver	Bronze
Extra-lightweight (−48 kg)	Hiromi Endō (JPN)	Milica Nikolić (SRB)	Paula Pareto (ARG)
Extra-lightweight (−48 kg)	Hiromi Endō (JPN)	Milica Nikolić (SRB)	Lucile Duport (FRA)
Half-lightweight (−52 kg)	Eleudis Valentim (BRA)	Réka Pupp (HUN)	Jéssica Pereira (BRA)
Half-lightweight (−52 kg)	Eleudis Valentim (BRA)	Réka Pupp (HUN)	Anja Štangar (SLO)
Lightweight (−57 kg)	Momo Tamaoki (JPN)	Nekoda Smythe-Davis (GBR)	Ivelina Ilieva (BUL)
Lightweight (−57 kg)	Momo Tamaoki (JPN)	Nekoda Smythe-Davis (GBR)	Hedvig Karakas (HUN)
Half-middleweight (−63 kg)	Nami Nabekura (JPN)	Megumi Tsugane (JPN)	Lucy Renshall (GBR)
Half-middleweight (−63 kg)	Nami Nabekura (JPN)	Megumi Tsugane (JPN)	Mia Hermansson (SWE)
Middleweight (−70 kg)	Bárbara Timo (BRA)	Fanny Estelle Posvite (FRA)	Michaela Polleres (AUT)
Middleweight (−70 kg)	Bárbara Timo (BRA)	Fanny Estelle Posvite (FRA)	Anna Bernholm (SWE)
Half-heavyweight (−78 kg)	Shori Hamada (JPN)	Sama Hawa Camara (FRA)	Luise Malzahn (GER)
Half-heavyweight (−78 kg)	Shori Hamada (JPN)	Sama Hawa Camara (FRA)	Yahima Ramirez (POR)
Heavyweight (+78 kg)	Larisa Cerić (BIH)	Santa Pakenytė (LTU)	Anne Fatoumata M'Bairo (FRA)
Heavyweight (+78 kg)	Larisa Cerić (BIH)	Santa Pakenytė (LTU)	Nami Inamori (JPN)

Source Results

=== Medal table ===
* Host nation (Croatia)

Rank	Nation	Gold	Silver	Bronze	Total
1	Japan (JPN)	5	1	3	9
2	Hungary (HUN)	3	1	1	5
3	Brazil (BRA)	2	1	2	5
4	France (FRA)	1	3	2	6
5	Georgia (GEO)	1	0	1	2
6	Azerbaijan (AZE)	1	0	0	1
6	Bosnia and Herzegovina (BIH)	1	0	0	1
8	Portugal (POR)	0	2	1	3
9	Russia (RUS)	0	1	2	3
9	Sweden (SWE)	0	1	2	3
11	Austria (AUT)	0	1	1	2
11	Great Britain (GBR)	0	1	1	2
13	Lithuania (LTU)	0	1	0	1
13	Serbia (SRB)	0	1	0	1
15	Italy (ITA)	0	0	4	4
16	Turkey (TUR)	0	0	2	2
17	Argentina (ARG)	0	0	1	1
17	Bulgaria (BUL)	0	0	1	1
17	Germany (GER)	0	0	1	1
17	Romania (ROU)	0	0	1	1
17	Slovenia (SLO)	0	0	1	1
17	United States (USA)	0	0	1	1
Totals (22 entries)		14	14	28	56
