= Magomed Magomedov (judoka born 1991) =

Russian judoka

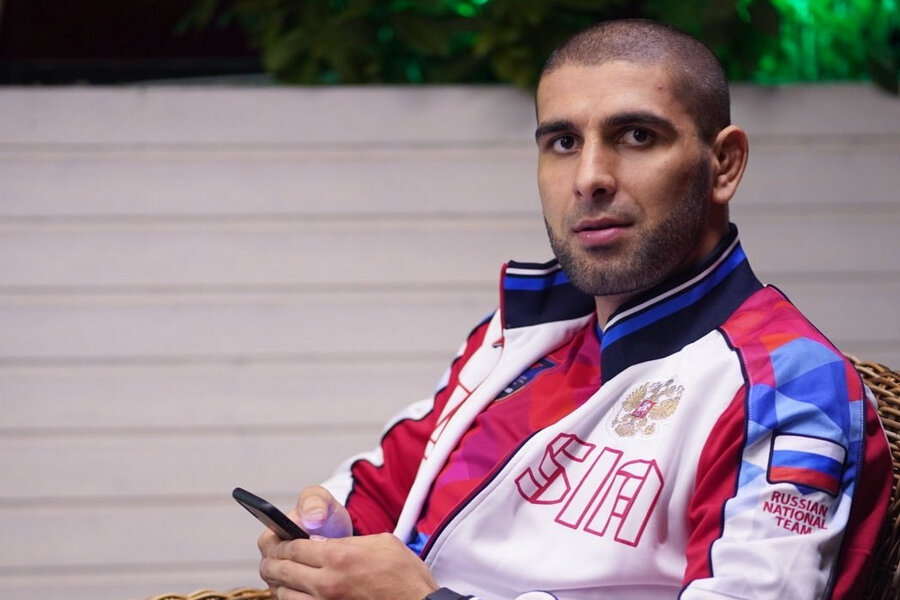
- Magomedov in 2023

Personal information
- Born: 13 August 1991 (age 35)
- Occupation: Judoka

Sport
- Country: Russia
- Sport: Judo, Combat Sambo
- Weight class: ‍–‍90 kg

Achievements and titles
- European Champ.: R16 (2016)
Medal record
Representing Russia
Men's judo
IJF Grand Slam
Silver medal – second place	2015 Tyumen	‍–‍90 kg
Bronze medal – third place	2014 Tyumen	‍–‍90 kg
Bronze medal – third place	2016 Tyumen	‍–‍90 kg
Bronze medal – third place	2017 Ekaterinburg	‍–‍90 kg
IJF Grand Prix
Silver medal – second place	2017 The Hague	‍–‍90 kg
Bronze medal – third place	2014 Samsun	‍–‍90 kg
Bronze medal – third place	2016 Tashkent	‍–‍90 kg
Bronze medal – third place	2017 Antalya	‍–‍90 kg
Bronze medal – third place	2017 Hohhot	‍–‍90 kg
European U23 Championships
Gold medal – first place	2011 Tyumen	‍–‍90 kg
World Juniors Championships
Gold medal – first place	2010 Agadir	‍–‍90 kg
Silver medal – second place	2009 Paris	‍–‍81 kg
European Junior Championships
Gold medal – first place	2010 Samokov	‍–‍90 kg
European Cadet Championships
Silver medal – second place	2007 Valletta	‍–‍81 kg
Men's Combat Sambo
World Championships
Gold medal – first place	2018 Bucharest	‍–‍90 kg
Gold medal – first place	2019 Cheongju	‍–‍90 kg
Gold medal – first place	2021 Tashkent	‍–‍88 kg

Profile at external databases
- IJF: 10687
- JudoInside.com: 68056
- Updated on 2 November 2023

Magomed Khalilovich Magomedov (Russian: Магомед Халилович Магомедов; born 13 August 1991) is a Russian three time world champion in combat sambo. He won World Sambo Championships in 2018, 2019, and 2021.

Magomedov was also a judoka. He competed at the 2016 European Judo Championships where he won his first bout and lost in the round of 16, but never at the adult individual world championships. He did finish second at the 2017 The Hague Grand Prix in the ‍–‍90 kg category.
