= Tural Safguliyev =

Azerbaijani judoka (born 1991)

Personal information
- Born: 14 January 1991 (age 35)
- Occupation: Judoka

Sport
- Country: Azerbaijan
- Sport: Judo
- Weight class: ‍–‍81 kg, ‍–‍90 kg

Achievements and titles
- World Champ.: R16 (2017)
- European Champ.: R16 (2013)
Medal record
Men's judo
Representing Azerbaijan
IJF Grand Slam
Bronze medal – third place	2016 Abu Dhabi	‍–‍90 kg
IJF Grand Prix
Gold medal – first place	2012 Baku	‍–‍81 kg
Silver medal – second place	2017 Cancún	‍–‍90 kg
Bronze medal – third place	2012 Abu Dhabi	‍–‍81 kg
Bronze medal – third place	2018 Antalya	‍–‍90 kg

Profile at external databases
- IJF: 3491
- JudoInside.com: 52947
- Updated on 25 November 2022

Tural Safguliyev (born 14 January 1991) is an Azerbaijani judoka.

Safguliyev is a bronze medalist from the 2018 Judo Grand Prix Antalya in the ‍–‍90 kg category.
