= Kseniia Zadvornova =

Russian judoka (born 1998)

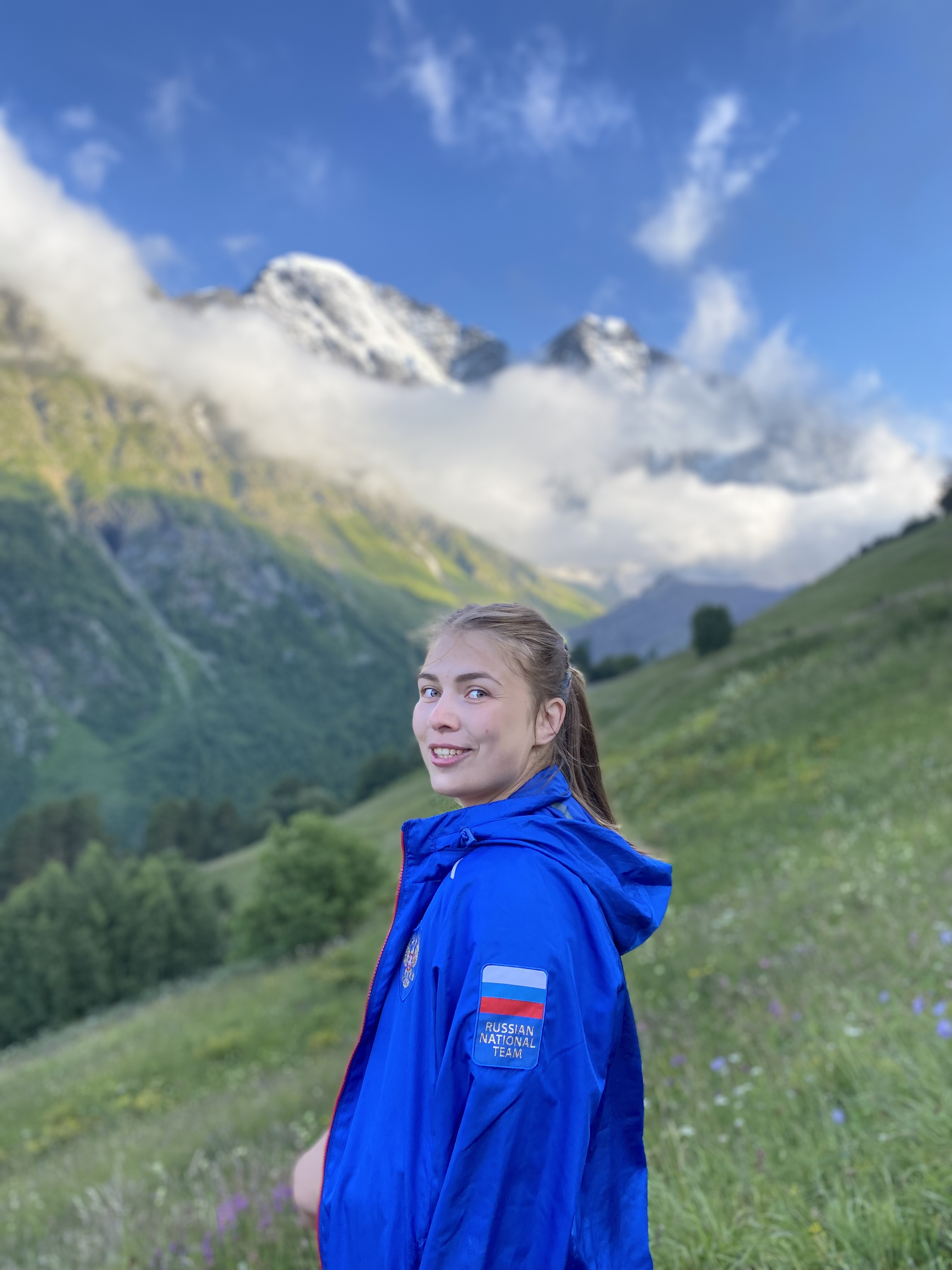
- Zadvornova in 2022

Personal information
- Native name: Ксения Валерьевна Задворнова
- Full name: Kseniia Valerievna Zadvornova
- Born: 29 December 1998 (age 27) Orsk, Orenburg oblast, Russia
- Occupation: Judoka
- Height: 167 cm (5 ft 6 in)

Sport
- Country: Russia
- Sport: Judo
- Weight class: ‍–‍70 kg (judo) ‍–‍72 kg (sambo)
- Rank: Black belt
- Club: Rodina sambo and judo club (Yekaterinburg, Sverdlovsk Oblast)
- Coached by: Valery Zadvornov; Yelena Zadvornova; Viktor Omelchenko
Medal record
Women's judo
Representing the IJF
European Cup
| Bronze medal – third place | 2025 Ljubljana | ‍–‍70 kg |
Representing AIN
European Cup
| Bronze medal – third place | 2024 Podgorica | ‍–‍70 kg |
Representing Russia
European Cup
| Gold medal – first place | 2021 Orenburg | ‍–‍70 kg |
| Silver medal – second place | 2019 Malaga | ‍–‍70 kg |
| Bronze medal – third place | 2019 Orenburg | ‍–‍70 kg |
Asian Cup
| Gold medal – first place | 2019 Aktau | ‍–‍70 kg |
Women's sambo
Representing Russia
World Championships
| Gold medal – first place | 2023 Yerevan | ‍–‍72 kg |
European Championships
| Gold medal – first place | 2024 Novi‑Sad | ‍–‍72 kg |
CIS Games
| Gold medal – first place | 2023 Zhlobin | ‍–‍72 kg |

Profile at external databases
- IJF: 21419
- JudoInside.com: 45358
- Updated on 11 April 2025

Kseniia Valerievna Zadvornova (Russian: Ксения Валерьевна Задворнова, born 29 December 1998) is a Russian judoka and sambo competitor. 2023 Russian judo and sambo national champion, 2023 World sambo champion, 2024 European sambo champion. Master of sport in judo. Honoured Master of sport in sambo.

== Background ==
Zadvornova was born 29 December 1998 in Orsk, Orenburg oblast, Russia. She is a second-generation judo and sambo competitor. At the age of ten, she began judo under her father Valerii and mother Yelena, who is 2003 world sambo runner-up.

== Career ==
=== Judo ===
She has multiple achievements in judo. In May 2019, she won one of the bronze medals at the European cup in Orenburg, Russia. In July 2019, Zadvornova won the Asian cup in Aktau, Kazakhstan. In October 2019, she finished with the silver medal at the European cup held in Spain. In September 2024, as an independent neutral athlete, she brought a bronze medal from the European cup in Podgorica. Also, she became a Russian national champion. To start off the next year, she competed at the European cup in February and took a bronze medal at the 70 kilograms.

=== Sambo ===
In addition to judo, Zadvornova also competed in sambo. In 2023, Zadvornova became a national champion. Off the back of the Russian championships, she claimed the World championships in November when she flawlessly defeated outstanding sambo European champion Anzhela Zhylinskaya of Belarus. After her run at the World championships, Zadvornova came back in March 2024, where she competed at the Russian nationals and won a silver medal. She made the European team as a Russian national finalist and claimed the European championships in Serbia, where she beat Anzhela Zhylinskaya in the final bout.

== Achievements ==
- Judo
  - 2017 World championships (team competition) — 3rd.
  - 2023 Russian championships — 1st.
- Sambo
  - 2023 Russian championships — 1st.
  - 2023 CIS Games — 1st.
  - 2023 World championships — 1st.
  - 2024 Russian championships — 2nd.
  - 2024 European championships — 1st.
