= 2014 Judo Grand Prix Astana =

Judo competition

Judo 2014 Judo Grand Prix Astana
- Location: Astana, Kazakhstan
- Dates: 10–12 October 2014
- Competitors: 277 from 36 nations

Competition at external databases
- Links: IJF • JudoInside

The 2014 Judo Grand Prix Astana was held in Astana, Kazakhstan from 10 to 12 October 2014.

== Medal summary ==
=== Men's events ===
Event	Gold	Silver	Bronze
Extra-lightweight (−60 kg)	Yeldos Smetov (KAZ)	Dashdavaagiin Amartüvshin (MGL)	Ganboldyn Kherlen (MGL)
Extra-lightweight (−60 kg)	Yeldos Smetov (KAZ)	Dashdavaagiin Amartüvshin (MGL)	Askhat Telmanov (KAZ)
Half-lightweight (−66 kg)	Yuuki Hashiguchi (JPN)	Zhansay Smagulov (KAZ)	Ren Miyazaki (JPN)
Half-lightweight (−66 kg)	Yuuki Hashiguchi (JPN)	Zhansay Smagulov (KAZ)	Sebastian Seidl (GER)
Lightweight (−73 kg)	Pierre Duprat (FRA)	Sagi Muki (ISR)	Khashbaataryn Tsagaanbaatar (MGL)
Lightweight (−73 kg)	Pierre Duprat (FRA)	Sagi Muki (ISR)	Sainjargalyn Nyam-Ochir (MGL)
Half-middleweight (−81 kg)	Alan Khubetsov (RUS)	Khasan Khalmurzaev (RUS)	Benjamin Münnich (GER)
Half-middleweight (−81 kg)	Alan Khubetsov (RUS)	Khasan Khalmurzaev (RUS)	Aziz Kalkamanuly (KAZ)
Middleweight (−90 kg)	Komronshokh Ustopiriyon (TJK)	Asset Akhmetzhanov (KAZ)	Alexandre Iddir (FRA)
Middleweight (−90 kg)	Komronshokh Ustopiriyon (TJK)	Asset Akhmetzhanov (KAZ)	Quedjau Nhabali (UKR)
Half-heavyweight (−100 kg)	Maxim Rakov (KAZ)	Dimitri Peters (GER)	Miklós Cirjenics (HUN)
Half-heavyweight (−100 kg)	Maxim Rakov (KAZ)	Dimitri Peters (GER)	Ramadan Darwish (EGY)
Heavyweight (+100 kg)	Barna Bor (HUN)	Iurii Krakovetskii (KGZ)	André Breitbarth (GER)
Heavyweight (+100 kg)	Barna Bor (HUN)	Iurii Krakovetskii (KGZ)	Daniel Allerstorfer (AUT)

=== Women's events ===
Event	Gold	Silver	Bronze
Extra-lightweight (−48 kg)	Otgontsetseg Galbadrakh (MGL)	Nathalia Brigida (BRA)	Valentina Moscatt (ITA)
Extra-lightweight (−48 kg)	Otgontsetseg Galbadrakh (MGL)	Nathalia Brigida (BRA)	Ebru Şahin (TUR)
Half-lightweight (−52 kg)	Joana Ramos (POR)	Christianne Legentil (MRI)	Eleudis Valentim (BRA)
Half-lightweight (−52 kg)	Joana Ramos (POR)	Christianne Legentil (MRI)	Gili Cohen (ISR)
Lightweight (−57 kg)	Hedvig Karakas (HUN)	Sabrina Filzmoser (AUT)	Giulia Quintavalle (ITA)
Lightweight (−57 kg)	Hedvig Karakas (HUN)	Sabrina Filzmoser (AUT)	Nekoda Smythe-Davis (GBR)
Half-middleweight (−63 kg)	Yarden Gerbi (ISR)	Anna Bernholm (SWE)	Kathrin Unterwurzacher (AUT)
Half-middleweight (−63 kg)	Yarden Gerbi (ISR)	Anna Bernholm (SWE)	Edwige Gwend (ITA)
Middleweight (−70 kg)	Bernadette Graf (AUT)	Esther Stam (GEO)	Laura Vargas Koch (GER)
Middleweight (−70 kg)	Bernadette Graf (AUT)	Esther Stam (GEO)	Szaundra Diedrich (GER)
Half-heavyweight (−78 kg)	Natalie Powell (GBR)	Luise Malzahn (GER)	Assunta Galeone (ITA)
Half-heavyweight (−78 kg)	Natalie Powell (GBR)	Luise Malzahn (GER)	Viktoriya Turks (UKR)
Heavyweight (+78 kg)	Franziska Konitz (GER)	Iryna Kindzerska (UKR)	Zarina Abdrassulova (KAZ)
Heavyweight (+78 kg)	Franziska Konitz (GER)	Iryna Kindzerska (UKR)	Svitlana Iaromka (UKR)

Source Results

=== Medal table ===
* Host nation (Kazakhstan)

Rank	Nation	Gold	Silver	Bronze	Total
1	Kazakhstan (KAZ)*	2	2	3	7
2	Hungary (HUN)	2	0	1	3
3	Germany (GER)	1	2	5	8
4	Mongolia (MGL)	1	1	3	5
5	Austria (AUT)	1	1	2	4
6	Israel (ISR)	1	1	1	3
7	Russia (RUS)	1	1	0	2
8	France (FRA)	1	0	1	2
8	Great Britain (GBR)	1	0	1	2
8	Japan (JPN)	1	0	1	2
11	Portugal (POR)	1	0	0	1
11	Tajikistan (TJK)	1	0	0	1
13	Ukraine (UKR)	0	1	3	4
14	Brazil (BRA)	0	1	1	2
15	Georgia (GEO)	0	1	0	1
15	Kyrgyzstan (KGZ)	0	1	0	1
15	Mauritius (MRI)	0	1	0	1
15	Sweden (SWE)	0	1	0	1
19	Italy (ITA)	0	0	4	4
20	Egypt (EGY)	0	0	1	1
20	Turkey (TUR)	0	0	1	1
Totals (21 entries)		14	14	28	56
