= 2018 World Sambo Championships =

Sambo competitions

- Venue: Polyvalent Hall
- Location: Bucharest, Romania
- Dates: 9–12 November 2018
- Competitors: 750 from 80 nations

The 2018 World Sambo Championships was held in Bucharest, Romania from 9 and 12 November 2018.

This tournament, marking the 80th of its kind, included 9 weight categories and three disciplines; men's and women's sambo and combat sambo. Around 750 athletes from 80 countries participated. Macau and Saint Lucia participated for the first time. A total prize of $216,000 was awarded.

== Medal table ==
Host nation

Rank	Nation	Gold	Silver	Bronze	Total
1	Russia	15	4	5	24
2	Georgia	4	1	3	8
3	Belarus	2	6	5	13
4	Ukraine	2	3	5	10
5	Kazakhstan	2	1	3	6
6	France	1	1	0	2
7	Tajikistan	1	0	3	4
8	Armenia	0	2	1	3
8	Bulgaria	0	2	1	3
8	Uzbekistan	0	2	1	3
11	Greece	0	1	1	2
11	Kyrgyzstan	0	1	1	2
11	Romania*	0	1	1	2
14	Azerbaijan	0	1	0	1
14	Croatia	0	1	0	1
16	Mongolia	0	0	8	8
17	Turkmenistan	0	0	6	6
18	Moldova	0	0	4	4
19	Serbia	0	0	2	2
20	Israel	0	0	1	1
20	Latvia	0	0	1	1
20	Philippines	0	0	1	1
20	South Korea	0	0	1	1
Totals (23 entries)		27	27	54	108

== Medal overview ==
=== Sambo events ===
==== Men ====
Event	Gold	Silver	Bronze
–52 kg	Andrey Kubarkov; Russia	Tigran Kirakosyan; Armenia	Erdenebaatar Shaaluu; Mongolia
–52 kg	Andrey Kubarkov; Russia	Tigran Kirakosyan; Armenia	Givi Nadareishvili; Georgia
–57 kg	Vakhtangi Chidrashvili; Georgia	Uladzislau Burdz; Belarus	Akhmaliddin Karimov; Tajikistan
–57 kg	Vakhtangi Chidrashvili; Georgia	Uladzislau Burdz; Belarus	Borislav Yanakov; Bulgaria
–62 kg	Khushqadam Khusravov; Tajikistan	Ruslan Bagdasarian; Russia	Savvas Karakizidis; Greece
–62 kg	Khushqadam Khusravov; Tajikistan	Ruslan Bagdasarian; Russia	Dmytro Ievdoshenko; Ukraine
–68 kg	Nurbol Serikov; Kazakhstan	Emil Hasanov; Azerbaijan	Nikita Kletskov; Russia
–68 kg	Nurbol Serikov; Kazakhstan	Emil Hasanov; Azerbaijan	Aliaksandr Koksha; Belarus
–74 kg	Stanislav Skryabin; Russia	Georgios Markarian; Greece	Behruz Khojazoda; Tajikistan
–74 kg	Stanislav Skryabin; Russia	Georgios Markarian; Greece	Arsen Ghazaryan; Armenia
–82 kg	Besarioni Berulava; Georgia	Sergey Kiryukhin; Russia	Bayanmunkh Gaajadamba; Mongolia
–82 kg	Besarioni Berulava; Georgia	Sergey Kiryukhin; Russia	Tsimafei Yemelyanau; Belarus
–90 kg	David Oganisyan; Russia	Aliaksei Stsepankou; Belarus	Dmitry Gerasimenko; Serbia
–90 kg	David Oganisyan; Russia	Aliaksei Stsepankou; Belarus	Paata Ghviniashvili; Georgia
–100 kg	Alsim Chernoskulov; Russia	Andrei Kazusionak; Belarus	Viktors Resko; Latvia
–100 kg	Alsim Chernoskulov; Russia	Andrei Kazusionak; Belarus	Daviti Loriashvili; Georgia
+100 kg	Artem Osipenko; Russia	Beka Berdzenishvili; Georgia	Vladimir Gajic; Serbia
+100 kg	Artem Osipenko; Russia	Beka Berdzenishvili; Georgia	Yury Rybak; Belarus

==== Women ====
Event	Gold	Silver	Bronze
–48 kg	Maria Molchanova; Russia	Nodira Gulova; Uzbekistan	Narantsetseg Ganbaatar; Mongolia
–48 kg	Maria Molchanova; Russia	Nodira Gulova; Uzbekistan	Mihaela Chiss; Romania
–52 kg	Diana Ryabova; Russia	Maryna Zharskaya; Belarus	Gulnur Yerbolova; Kazakhstan
–52 kg	Diana Ryabova; Russia	Maryna Zharskaya; Belarus	Paulina Esanu; Moldova
–56 kg	Laure Fournier; France	Anastasiia Arkhipava; Belarus	Tatyana Kazenyuk; Russia
–56 kg	Laure Fournier; France	Anastasiia Arkhipava; Belarus	Azzaya Chintogtokh; Mongolia
–60 kg	Yana Kostenko; Russia	Anastasiya Shevchenko; Ukraine	Sabina Artemciuc; Moldova
–60 kg	Yana Kostenko; Russia	Anastasiya Shevchenko; Ukraine	Katsiaryna Prakapenka; Belarus
–64 kg	Tatsiana Matsko; Belarus	Olena Sayko; Ukraine	Ekaterina Onoprienko; Russia
–64 kg	Tatsiana Matsko; Belarus	Olena Sayko; Ukraine	Baasanjargal Bayarbat; Mongolia
–68 kg	Marina Mokhnatkina; Russia	Lucija Babic; Croatia	Nantalia Budyanu; Moldova
–68 kg	Marina Mokhnatkina; Russia	Lucija Babic; Croatia	Anzhela Zhylinskaya; Belarus
–72 kg	Nino Odzelashvili; Georgia	Lorena Podelenczki; Romania	Nataliya Smal; Ukraine
–72 kg	Nino Odzelashvili; Georgia	Lorena Podelenczki; Romania	Victoria Bolohan; Moldova
–80 kg	Sviatlana Tsimashenka; Belarus	Mariya Oryashkova; Bulgaria	Sainbuyan Bataa; Mongolia
–80 kg	Sviatlana Tsimashenka; Belarus	Mariya Oryashkova; Bulgaria	Halyna Kovalska; Ukraine
+80 kg	Elene Kebadze; Georgia	Anna Balashova; Russia	Sydney Sy Tancontian; Philippines
+80 kg	Elene Kebadze; Georgia	Anna Balashova; Russia	Anastasiya Sapsai; Ukraine

=== Combat Sambo events ===
Event	Gold	Silver	Bronze
–52 kg	Rodion Askanakov; Russia	Grigor Mkhitaryan; Armenia	Nurken Dombayev; Kazakhstan
–52 kg	Rodion Askanakov; Russia	Grigor Mkhitaryan; Armenia	Novruz Atayev; Turkmenistan
–57 kg	Alexander Nesterov; Russia	Oleksandr Voropaiev; Ukraine	Togtokhbayar Nyamkhuu; Mongolia
–57 kg	Alexander Nesterov; Russia	Oleksandr Voropaiev; Ukraine	Serikzhan Tussupov; Kazakhstan
–62 kg	Kamil Abdulazizov; Russia	Andrii Kucherenko; Ukraine	Sorbon Latifov; Tajikistan
–62 kg	Kamil Abdulazizov; Russia	Andrii Kucherenko; Ukraine	Kerimberdi Dovletov; Turkmenistan
–68 kg	Sheikh-Mansur Khabibulaev; Russia	Nurgeldi Kiyalbekov; Kazakhstan	Abdylla Babayev; Turkmenistan
–68 kg	Sheikh-Mansur Khabibulaev; Russia	Nurgeldi Kiyalbekov; Kazakhstan	Tariel Abasov; Israel
–74 kg	Vladyslav Rudniev; Ukraine	Daiyrbek Karyiaev; Kyrgyzstan	Zaur Azizov; Russia
–74 kg	Vladyslav Rudniev; Ukraine	Daiyrbek Karyiaev; Kyrgyzstan	Amartuvshin Khuukhenkhuu; Mongolia
–82 kg	Temirlan Ikhsangaliev; Kazakhstan	Dmitry Samoylov; Russia	Kim Taegeun; South Korea
–82 kg	Temirlan Ikhsangaliev; Kazakhstan	Dmitry Samoylov; Russia	Javlanbek Madaminov; Turkmenistan
–90 kg	Magomed Magomedov; Russia	Louis Laurent; France	Zhanybek Amatov; Kyrgyzstan
–90 kg	Magomed Magomedov; Russia	Louis Laurent; France	Bekhzod Nurmatov; Uzbekistan
–100 kg	Anatolii Voloshynov; Ukraine	Zlatev Denislav; Bulgaria	Charymyrat Annagurbanov; Turkmenistan
–100 kg	Anatolii Voloshynov; Ukraine	Zlatev Denislav; Bulgaria	Mikhail Mokhnatkin; Russia
+100 kg	Valentin Moldavsky; Russia	Khakimjon Ismoilov; Uzbekistan	Ivadullayev Babajan; Turkmenistan
+100 kg	Valentin Moldavsky; Russia	Khakimjon Ismoilov; Uzbekistan	Razmik Tonoyan; Ukraine
