= 2014 World Judo Championships – Men's 90 kg =

Judo competition

Judo Men's 90 kg at the 2014 World Judo Championships
- Venue: Traktor Ice Arena
- Location: Chelyabinsk, Russia
- Date: 29 August 2014
- Competitors: 48 from 37 nations
- Total prize money: $14,000

Medalists
| gold medal | Ilias Iliadis (3rd title) | Greece |
| silver medal | Krisztián Tóth | Hungary |
| bronze medal | Varlam Liparteliani | Georgia |
| bronze medal | Kirill Voprosov | Russia |

Competition at external databases
- Links: IJF • JudoInside

The men's 90 kg competition of the 2014 World Judo Championships was held on 29 August.

== Medalists ==
| Gold | Silver | Bronze |
|---|---|---|
| Ilias Iliadis (GRE) | Krisztián Tóth (HUN) | Varlam Liparteliani (GEO); Kirill Voprosov (RUS) |

== Results ==
=== Finals ===
Semi-finals
(Hungary) Krisztián Tóth | 001
(Russia) Kirill Voprosov | 000
(Uzbekistan) Sherali Juraev | 000
(Greece) Ilias Iliadis | 001

Final
(Hungary) Krisztián Tóth | 000
(Greece) Ilias Iliadis | 100

=== Repechage ===
| Repechage | | Third place |
| (Georgia (country)) Varlam Liparteliani | 100 |
| (Ukraine) Quedjau Nhabali | 000 | (Georgia (country)) Varlam Liparteliani | 100 |
| | | (Uzbekistan) Sherali Juraev | 000 |

| Repechage | | Third place |
| (Russia) Kirill Denisov | 100 |
| (Netherlands) Guillaume Elmont | 010 | (Russia) Kirill Denisov | 000 |
| | | (Russia) Kirill Voprosov | 100 |

=== Pool A ===
First Round
(China) Cheng Xunzhao | 000
(Estonia) Aleksandr Marmeljuk | 100
(Italy) Walter Facente | 000
(France) Alexandre Iddir | 101
(Ivory Coast) Kinapeya Kone | 100
(Lebanon) Francois Saade | 000
(Slovakia) Milan Randl | 001
(Serbia) Aleksandar Kukolj | 100

Quarterfinals
(Georgia (country)) Varlam Liparteliani | 100
(Estonia) Aleksandr Marmeljuk | 000
(France) Alexandre Iddir | 000
(Lithuania) Karolis Bauža | 100
(Hungary) Krisztián Tóth | 100
(Ivory Coast) Kinapeya Kone | 000
(Serbia) Aleksandar Kukolj | 100
(Turkmenistan) Batyr Hojamuhammedov | 000

Semifinals
(Georgia (country)) Varlam Liparteliani | 100
(Lithuania) Karolis Bauža | 000
(Hungary) Krisztián Tóth | 100
(Serbia) Aleksandar Kukolj | 000

Final
(Georgia (country)) Varlam Liparteliani | 000
(Hungary) Krisztián Tóth | 000

=== Pool B ===
First Round
(Saudi Arabia) Naif Mazyu | 000
(Tajikistan) Saidzhalol Saidov | 100
(Ukraine) Quedjau Nhabali | 100
(Djibouti) Radwan Abdallah | 000
(Russia) Kirill Voprosov | 101
(Kazakhstan) Samat Yessen | 001
(Switzerland) Ciril Grossklaus | 100
(Greece) Periklis Psalidas | 000

Quarterfinals
(Netherlands) Noël Van 't End | 110
(Tajikistan) Saidzhalol Saidov | 000
(Uruguay) Juan Romero | 000
(Ukraine) Quedjau Nhabali | 100
(Georgia (country)) Beka Gviniashvili | 000
(Russia) Kirill Voprosov | 100
(Switzerland) Ciril Grossklaus | 100
(Palestine) Oday Thwaib | 000

Semifinals
(Netherlands) Noël Van 't End | 000
(Ukraine) Quedjau Nhabali | 010
(Russia) Kirill Voprosov | 001
(Switzerland) Ciril Grossklaus | 000

Final
(Ukraine) Quedjau Nhabali | 001
(Russia) Kirill Voprosov | 100

=== Pool C ===
First Round
(Cameroon) Stephane Ombiongno | 000
(Lithuania) Ovidijus Varnas | 100
(Tajikistan) Komronshoh Ustopiriyon | 000
(Switzerland) Domenik Wenzinger | 000
(Hungary) Gábor Vér | 000
(Serbia) Dmitrij Gerasimenko | 011
(South Korea) Kim Jae-yun | 000
(Uzbekistan) Sherali Juraev | 100

Quarterfinals
(Russia) Kirill Denisov | 100
(Lithuania) Ovidijus Varnas | 000
(Tajikistan) Komronshoh Ustopiriyon | 110
(Kyrgyzstan) Azamat Bektursunov | 000
(Brazil) Tiago Camilo | 000
(Serbia) Dmitrij Gerasimenko | 001
(Uzbekistan) Sherali Juraev | 111
(Turkmenistan) Nuraly Yalkapov | 000

Semifinals
(Russia) Kirill Denisov | 000
(Tajikistan) Komronshoh Ustopiriyon | 000
(Serbia) Dmitrij Gerasimenko | 000
(Uzbekistan) Sherali Juraev | 000

Final
(Russia) Kirill Denisov | 000
(Uzbekistan) Sherali Juraev | 100

=== Pool D ===
First Round
(Algeria) Abderahmane Benamadi | 001
(Venezuela) Mervin Rodríguez | 010
(Ukraine) Vadym Synyavsky | 000
(Japan) Mashu Baker | 110
(Egypt) Hatem Abd el Akher | 100
(Sweden) Joakim Dvarby | 000
(Dominican Republic) Cristhian Gomera | 100
(Mexico) Isao Cardenas | 002

Quarterfinals
(Greece) Ilias Iliadis | 102
(Venezuela) Mervin Rodríguez | 000
(Portugal) Célio Dias | 100
(Japan) Mashu Baker | 000
(Germany) Marc Odenthal | 000
(Egypt) Hatem Abd el Akher | 010
(Dominican Republic) Cristhian Gomera | 000
(Netherlands) Guillaume Elmont | 100

Semifinals
(Greece) Ilias Iliadis | 100
(Portugal) Célio Dias | 000
(Egypt) Hatem Abd el Akher | 000
(Netherlands) Guillaume Elmont | 010

Final
(Greece) Ilias Iliadis | 100
(Netherlands) Guillaume Elmont | 000

== Prize money ==
The sums listed bring the total prizes awarded to $14,000 for the individual event.

| Medal | Total | Judoka | Coach |
|---|---|---|---|
| Gold | $6,000 | $4,800 | $1,200 |
| Silver | $4,000 | $3,200 | $800 |
| Bronze | $2,000 | $1,600 | $400 |
