= Eleudis Valentim =

Brazilian judoka (born 1992)

Personal information
- Born: 1 May 1992 (age 34)
- Occupation: Judoka

Sport
- Country: Brazil
- Sport: Judo
- Weight class: ‍–‍52 kg

Achievements and titles
- World Champ.: R32 (2013)
- Pan American Champ.: 7th (2020)
Medal record
Women's judo
Representing Brazil
IJF Grand Slam
Gold medal – first place	2012 Rio de Janeiro	‍–‍52 kg
Bronze medal – third place	2012 Moscow	‍–‍52 kg
Bronze medal – third place	2019 Brasilia	‍–‍52 kg
IJF Grand Prix
Gold medal – first place	2017 Zagreb	‍–‍52 kg
Silver medal – second place	2018 The Hague	‍–‍52 kg
Bronze medal – third place	2012 Abu Dhabi	‍–‍52 kg
Bronze medal – third place	2014 Astana	‍–‍52 kg
Bronze medal – third place	2014 Tashkent	‍–‍52 kg
World Juniors Championships
Silver medal – second place	2010 Agadir	‍–‍52 kg
Pan American Junior Championships
Gold medal – first place	2009 San Salvador	‍–‍52 kg
Gold medal – first place	2010 Buena Vista	‍–‍52 kg
Summer Universiade
Silver medal – second place	2017 Taipei	‍–‍52 kg

Profile at external databases
- IJF: 1081
- JudoInside.com: 57828
- Updated on 21 November 2022

Eleudis Valentim (born 1 May 1992) is a Brazilian judoka.

Valentim is the gold medalist of the 2017 Judo Grand Prix Zagreb in the ‍–‍52 kg category.
