= Chino Sy Tancontian =

Filipino athlete (born 2000)

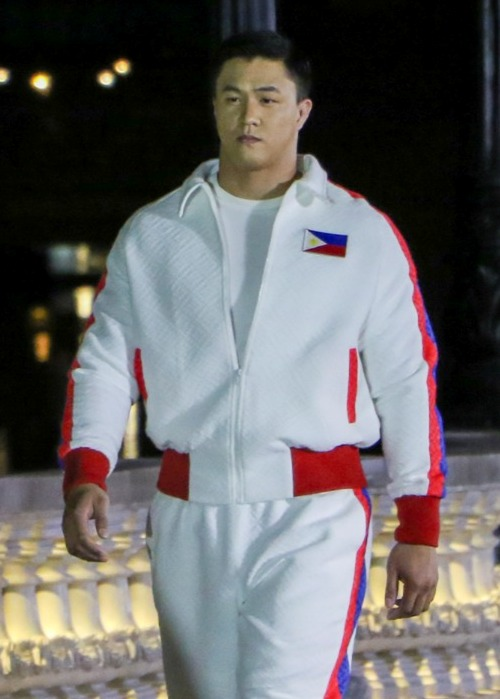
- Sy-Tancontian in 2025

Personal information
- National team: Philippines
- Born: December 18, 2000 (age 25)
- Home town: Davao City
- Education: University of Santo Tomas

Sport
- Sport: Judo; Sambo; Freestyle wrestling
- University team: UST Growling Tigers (Judo)
Medal record
Men's sambo
Representing Philippines
Southeast Asian Sambo Championships
Gold medal – first place	2023 Kuala Lumpur	Sport -98kg
SEA Games
Gold medal – first place	2019 Philippines	Sport -82kg
Men's wrestling
Representing Philippines
SEA Games
Silver medal – second place	2023 Cambodia	Freestyle -97kg
Men's judo
Representing Philippines
SEA Games
Gold medal – first place	2025 Thailand	-100kg
Gold medal – first place	2025 Thailand	Mixed team

Chino Sy Tancontian (born December 18, 2000) is a Filipino sambist and judoka. He has also competed as a freestyle wrestler.

== Early life and education ==
Chino Sy Tancontian was born on December 18, 2000. He pursued a degree in fitness sports management at the University of Santo Tomas.

== Career ==
=== Judo ===
Tancontian represented the UST Growling Tigers in judo at the University Athletic Association of the Philippines (UAAP). He started representing UST in 2017 in senior high school winning a gold in the juniors division. In college, he finished as a bronze medallist on his first year of competing. He almost quit but returned to win four more gold medals from Seasons 85 to Season 88 in from 2023 to 2026.

He has represented the Philippines internationally in judo. He will attempt to qualify for the 2028 Summer Olympics.

=== Sambo ===
Tancontian competed in sambo at the 2019 SEA Games in the Philippines. He won against Gary Chow of Singapore in the gold medal match of the 82 kg division final.

At the 2023 Southeast Asian Sambo Championships in Kuala Lumpur, he won a gold in the -98 kg division.

=== Freestyle wrestling ===
Tancontian returned to the SEA Games in the 2023 edition in Cambodia but as a freestyle wrestler. He won a silver at the freestyle 97 kg category.

== Personal life ==
Tancontian hails from Davao City. He comes from a family of athletes. His father Paolo is the founder and president of Pilipinas Sambo Federation. His sister Sydney is a kurash and sambo athlete.
