= Yuuki Hashiguchi =

Japanese judoka

Personal information
- Nationality: Japanese
- Born: 8 June 1994 (age 32)
- Occupation: Judoka

Sport
- Country: Japan
- Sport: Judo
- Weight class: ‍–‍66 kg
Medal record
Men's judo
Representing Japan
IJF Grand Slam
| Silver medal – second place | 2016 Tokyo | ‍–‍66 kg |
IJF Grand Prix
| Gold medal – first place | 2014 Astana | ‍–‍66 kg |
| Gold medal – first place | 2017 Zagreb | ‍–‍66 kg |
| Bronze medal – third place | 2017 Hohhot | ‍–‍66 kg |
World Juniors Championships
| Gold medal – first place | 2013 Ljubljana | ‍–‍66 kg |
| Bronze medal – third place | 2010 Agadir | ‍–‍66 kg |

Profile at external databases
- IJF: 3615
- JudoInside.com: 71880
- Updated on 25 November 2022

Yuuki Hashiguchi (born 8 June 1994) is a Japanese judoka.

Hashiguchi is the gold medalist of the 2017 Judo Grand Prix Zagreb in the ‍–‍66 kg category.
