= 2011 European U23 Judo Championships =

Judo competition

Judo 2011 European U23 Judo Championships
- Location: Tyumen, Russia
- Dates: 18–20 November 2011

Competition at external databases
- Links: JudoInside

The 2011 European U23 Judo Championships is an edition of the European U23 Judo Championships, organised by the European Judo Union. It was held in Tyumen, Russia from 18 to 20 November 2011.

== Medal summary ==
=== Medal table ===
* Host nation (Russia)

Rank	Nation	Gold	Silver	Bronze	Total
1	Russia (RUS)*	4	4	7	15
2	Hungary (HUN)	3	0	2	5
3	Germany (GER)	2	0	4	6
4	Ukraine (UKR)	1	2	1	4
5	Turkey (TUR)	1	1	1	3
6	Spain (ESP)	1	0	1	2
7	Austria (AUT)	1	0	0	1
7	Bulgaria (BUL)	1	0	0	1
9	Italy (ITA)	0	1	2	3
10	France (FRA)	0	1	1	2
10	Poland (POL)	0	1	1	2
10	Romania (ROU)	0	1	1	2
13	Armenia (ARM)	0	1	0	1
13	Israel (ISR)	0	1	0	1
13	Slovenia (SLO)	0	1	0	1
16	Azerbaijan (AZE)	0	0	1	1
16	Belarus (BLR)	0	0	1	1
16	Croatia (CRO)	0	0	1	1
16	Moldova (MDA)	0	0	1	1
16	Netherlands (NED)	0	0	1	1
16	Sweden (SWE)	0	0	1	1
16	Switzerland (SUI)	0	0	1	1
Totals (22 entries)		14	14	28	56

=== Men's events ===
Event	Gold	Silver	Bronze
Extra-lightweight (−60 kg)	Yanislav Gerchev (BUL)	Robert Mshvidobadze (RUS)	Dmitriy Kulikov (RUS)
Extra-lightweight (−60 kg)	Yanislav Gerchev (BUL)	Robert Mshvidobadze (RUS)	Vugar Shirinli (AZE)
Half-lightweight (−66 kg)	Bence Zámbori (HUN)	Mehmet Durmaz (TUR)	Zsolt Gorjánácz (HUN)
Half-lightweight (−66 kg)	Bence Zámbori (HUN)	Mehmet Durmaz (TUR)	Kilian Le Blouch (FRA)
Lightweight (−73 kg)	Zelimkhan Ozdoev (RUS)	Massimiliano Carollo (ITA)	Piotr Kurkiewicz (POL)
Lightweight (−73 kg)	Zelimkhan Ozdoev (RUS)	Massimiliano Carollo (ITA)	Denis Iartsev (RUS)
Half-middleweight (−81 kg)	Krisztián Tóth (HUN)	Artyom Baghdasaryan (ARM)	Adrian Nacimiento Lorenzo (ESP)
Half-middleweight (−81 kg)	Krisztián Tóth (HUN)	Artyom Baghdasaryan (ARM)	Stanislav Semenov (RUS)
Middleweight (−90 kg)	Magomed Magomedov (RUS)	Quedjau Nhabali (UKR)	Joakim Dvärby (SWE)
Middleweight (−90 kg)	Magomed Magomedov (RUS)	Quedjau Nhabali (UKR)	Marc Odenthal (GER)
Half-heavyweight (−100 kg)	Adlan Bisultanov (RUS)	Khaibula Magomedov (RUS)	Domenico Di Guida (ITA)
Half-heavyweight (−100 kg)	Adlan Bisultanov (RUS)	Khaibula Magomedov (RUS)	Feyyaz Yazıcı (TUR)
Heavyweight (+100 kg)	Sergei Prokin (RUS)	Vlăduț Simionescu (ROU)	André Breitbarth (GER)
Heavyweight (+100 kg)	Sergei Prokin (RUS)	Vlăduț Simionescu (ROU)	Magomed Nazhmudinov (RUS)

=== Women's events ===
Event	Gold	Silver	Bronze
Extra-lightweight (−48 kg)	Kay Kraus (GER)	Ekaterina Tikhonova (RUS)	Odette Giuffrida (ITA)
Extra-lightweight (−48 kg)	Kay Kraus (GER)	Ekaterina Tikhonova (RUS)	Tatiana Osoianu (MDA)
Half-lightweight (−52 kg)	Mariia Buiok (UKR)	Shushana Hevondian (UKR)	Jacqueline Lisson (GER)
Half-lightweight (−52 kg)	Mariia Buiok (UKR)	Shushana Hevondian (UKR)	Alessia Staraverava (RUS)
Lightweight (−57 kg)	Tuğba Zehir (TUR)	Hélène Receveaux (FRA)	Larissa Csatari (SUI)
Lightweight (−57 kg)	Tuğba Zehir (TUR)	Hélène Receveaux (FRA)	Loredana Ohai (ROU)
Half-middleweight (−63 kg)	Kathrin Unterwurzacher (AUT)	Halima Mohamed-Seghir (POL)	Eszter Gáspár (HUN)
Half-middleweight (−63 kg)	Kathrin Unterwurzacher (AUT)	Halima Mohamed-Seghir (POL)	Martyna Trajdos (GER)
Middleweight (−70 kg)	Laura Vargas Koch (GER)	Anka Pogačnik (SLO)	Marija Cosic Zgalin (CRO)
Middleweight (−70 kg)	Laura Vargas Koch (GER)	Anka Pogačnik (SLO)	Daria Davydova (RUS)
Half-heavyweight (−78 kg)	Abigél Joó (HUN)	Omri Kenyon (ISR)	Ivanna Makukha (UKR)
Half-heavyweight (−78 kg)	Abigél Joó (HUN)	Omri Kenyon (ISR)	Alena Prokopenko (RUS)
Heavyweight (+78 kg)	Sara Alvarez Folgueira (ESP)	Maria Gorbunova (RUS)	Janine Penders (NED)
Heavyweight (+78 kg)	Sara Alvarez Folgueira (ESP)	Maria Gorbunova (RUS)	Maryna Slutskaya (BLR)

Source Results
