= Krisztián Tóth =

Hungarian judoka (born 1994)

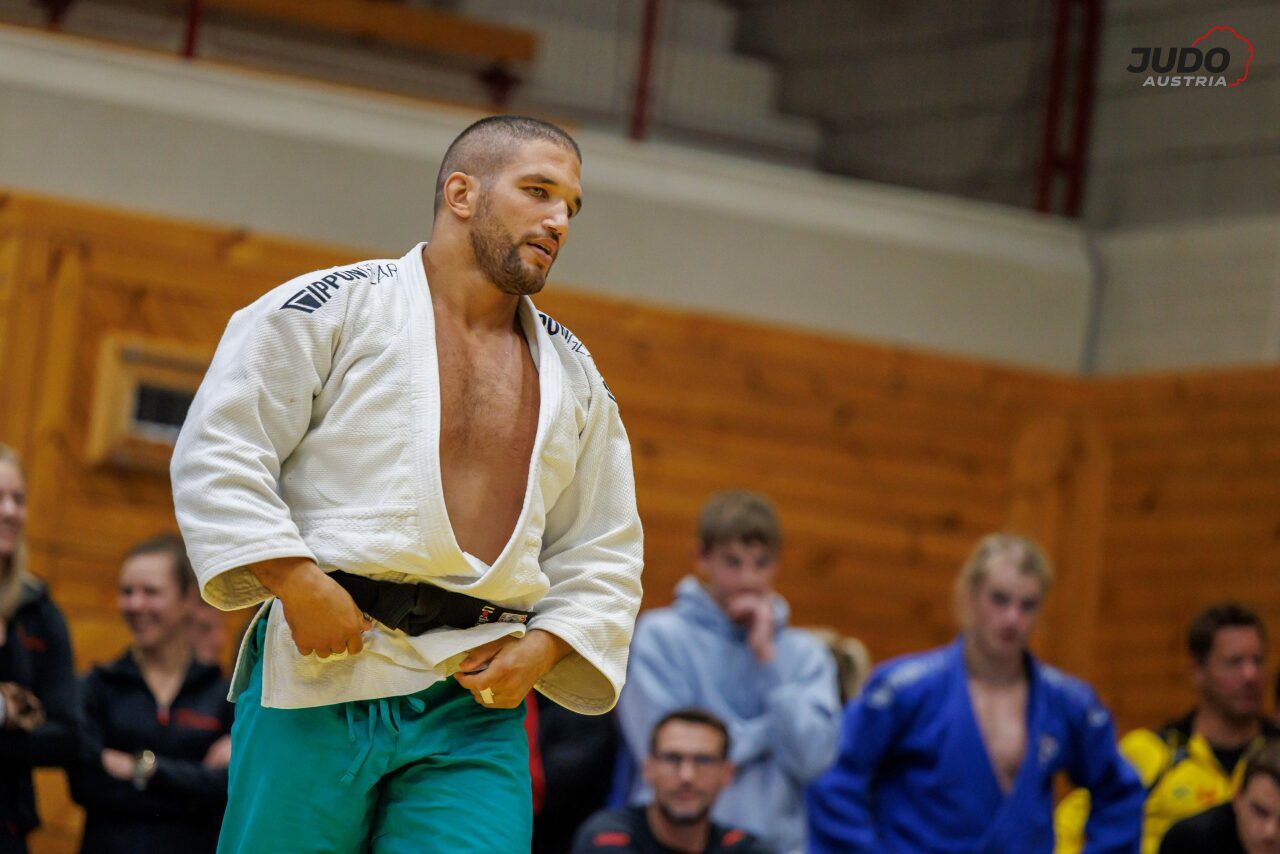
- Tóth participates in the Austrian 1. Bundesliga 2022

Personal information
- Nationality: Hungary
- Born: 1 May 1994 (age 32) Darmstadt, Germany
- Occupation: Judoka
- Height: 1.74 m (5 ft 9 in)

Sport
- Country: Hungary
- Sport: Judo
- Weight class: ‍–‍90 kg, ‍–‍100 kg
- Rank: 3rd dan black belt

Achievements and titles
- Olympic Games: (bronze) (2020)
- World Champ.: (silver) (2014)
- European Champ.: (silver) (2016, 2024)
Medal record
Men's judo
Representing Hungary
Olympic Games
Bronze medal – third place	2020 Tokyo	‍–‍90 kg
World Championships
Silver medal – second place	2014 Chelyabinsk	‍–‍90 kg
Bronze medal – third place	2021 Budapest	‍–‍90 kg
European Championships
Silver medal – second place	2016 Kazan	‍–‍90 kg
Silver medal – second place	2024 Zagreb	‍–‍90 kg
Bronze medal – third place	2014 Montpellier	‍–‍90 kg
Bronze medal – third place	2021 Lisbon	‍–‍90 kg
Bronze medal – third place	2023 Montpellier	‍–‍90 kg
World Masters
Silver medal – second place	2018 Guangzhou	‍–‍90 kg
IJF Grand Slam
Gold medal – first place	2014 Abu Dhabi	‍–‍90 kg
Silver medal – second place	2017 Ekaterinburg	‍–‍90 kg
Silver medal – second place	2018 Abu Dhabi	‍–‍90 kg
Silver medal – second place	2021 Antalya	‍–‍90 kg
Silver medal – second place	2022 Tbilisi	‍–‍90 kg
Silver medal – second place	2023 Tel Aviv	‍–‍90 kg
Silver medal – second place	2024 Baku	‍–‍90 kg
Bronze medal – third place	2015 Abu Dhabi	‍–‍90 kg
Bronze medal – third place	2019 Paris	‍–‍90 kg
Bronze medal – third place	2019 Baku	‍–‍90 kg
Bronze medal – third place	2021 Tel Aviv	‍–‍90 kg
Bronze medal – third place	2021 Tashkent	‍–‍90 kg
Bronze medal – third place	2022 Antalya	‍–‍90 kg
Bronze medal – third place	2023 Tashkent	‍–‍90 kg
Bronze medal – third place	2023 Baku	‍–‍90 kg
Bronze medal – third place	2023 Abu Dhabi	‍–‍90 kg
IJF Grand Prix
Gold medal – first place	2014 Zagreb	‍–‍90 kg
Gold medal – first place	2015 Zagreb	‍–‍90 kg
Gold medal – first place	2016 Budapest	‍–‍90 kg
Gold medal – first place	2017 Zagreb	‍–‍90 kg
Gold medal – first place	2018 Budapest	‍–‍90 kg
Gold medal – first place	2023 Linz	‍–‍90 kg
Gold medal – first place	2023 Zagreb	‍–‍90 kg
Silver medal – second place	2014 Budapest	‍–‍90 kg
Silver medal – second place	2014 Ulaanbaatar	‍–‍90 kg
Silver medal – second place	2016 Havana	‍–‍90 kg
Silver medal – second place	2016 Düsseldorf	‍–‍90 kg
Silver medal – second place	2018 Tunis	‍–‍90 kg
Silver medal – second place	2018 Tashkent	‍–‍90 kg
Silver medal – second place	2023 Almada	‍–‍90 kg
Silver medal – second place	2025 Linz	‍–‍100 kg
Bronze medal – third place	2015 Tbilisi	‍–‍90 kg
Bronze medal – third place	2019 Zagreb	‍–‍90 kg
European U23 Championships
Gold medal – first place	2011 Tyumen	‍–‍81 kg
Gold medal – first place	2013 Samokov	‍–‍90 kg
Bronze medal – third place	2012 Prague	‍–‍90 kg
World Juniors Championships
Gold medal – first place	2014 Fort Lauderdale	‍–‍90 kg
Bronze medal – third place	2010 Agadir	‍–‍81 kg
European Junior Championships
Bronze medal – third place	2011 Lommel	‍–‍81 kg
World Cadets Championships
Silver medal – second place	2009 Budapest	‍–‍73 kg
European Cadet Championships
Bronze medal – third place	2010 Teplice	‍–‍81 kg
Summer Universiade
Bronze medal – third place	2019 Naples	‍–‍90 kg
Youth Olympic Games
Bronze medal – third place	2010 Singapore	‍–‍81 kg

Profile at external databases
- IJF: 3364
- JudoInside.com: 49987
- Updated on 9 March 2025

Krisztián Tóth (born 1 May 1994) is a Hungarian judoka. He won one of the bronze medals in the men's 90 kg event at the 2020 Summer Olympics in Tokyo, Japan.

Tóth also competed at the 2016 Summer Olympics in Rio de Janeiro, in the men's 90 kg, where he was ranked joint 9th (i.e., did not advance from the Round of 16 to the Quarter Finals), and at the 2024 Summer Olympics in Paris, again in the men's 90 kg, where he was ranked joint 17th (i.e., did not advance from the first round to the Round of 16).

Olympic Games
Preceded by László Cseh; Aida Mohamed	Flagbearer for Hungary (with Blanka Bíró); Paris 2024	Succeeded by Incumbent
