= Pilipinas Sambo Federation =

- Sport: Sambo
- Jurisdiction: Philippines
- Membership: Philippine Olympic Committee - 2018
- Abbreviation: PSFI
- Founded: October 5, 2015
- Affiliation: International SAMBO Federation [FIAS]
- Affiliation date: 2016
- Regional affiliation: SAMBO Union of Asia [SUA]
- Affiliation date: 2015
- Headquarters: Davao City
- President: Paolo Lim Tancontian
- Secretary: Janet T. Sy
- (Philippines)

The Pilipinas Sambo Federation Inc. (PSFI) is the national governing body of the Russian martial arts of sambo in the Philippines and is a member of Fédération Internationale de Sambo (FIAS) & SAMBO Union of Asia (SUA) .

== History ==
Initially organized as SAMBO Pilipinas, the Pilipinas Sambo Federation (PSFI) is recognized by Sambo Union of Asia(SUA) as the national governing body of SAMBO in the Philippines in 2015 and was granted full membership by the Fédération Internationale de Sambo (FIAS) in 2016 .

The Philippines through the federation sent a delegate composing of delegates to the World Sambo Championships in Casablanca, Morocco in November 2015. The sporting body organized the first national championship on March 31, 2016, at the Abreeza Mall in Davao City.

The organization is securing accreditation as a National Sports Association. By December 2016, the PSFI is already preparing necessary documents for it to be recognized by the Philippine Olympic Committee. The PSFI plans to conduct a launch of the sport in the country in 2017.

In June 2017 they organized the qualifiers for the sambo event of the 2017 Asian Indoor and Martial Arts Games at the Harrison Plaza.

PSFI was recognized as associate member by the Philippine Olympic Committee (POC) during its General Assembly in June 2018, along with the Philippine Cricket Association. and received NSA Regular Member status in December 2019.

Pilipinas SAMBO Federation's first World-level achievement came from Sydney Sy who garnered bronze medals in the 2018 World SAMBO Championship in Bucharest Romania and another bronze medal in the 2019 World Cup in Moscow, Russia. A very first for the Philippines and for South East Asian Region.

In December 3–5, 2019, SAMBO was included in the sports program of the 30th South East Asian Games held in Angeles, Pampanga Philippines with 7 categories consisting of Sport SAMBO, Combat SAMBO and 5 Man Mixed SAMBO Team Events. Philippines, Indonesia, Singapore, Thailand, Malaysia and Vietnam took part in the inaugural event.
