= Zachary Burt =

Canadian judoka (born 1993)

Personal information
- Nationality: Canadian
- Born: 4 September 1993 (age 32)
- Occupation: Judoka

Sport
- Country: Canada
- Sport: Judo
- Weight class: –90 kg

Achievements and titles
- World Champ.: R32 (2017)
- Pan American Champ.: (2019, 2020)
Medal record
Men's judo
Representing Canada
Pan American Championships
Bronze medal – third place	2019 Lima	–90 kg
Bronze medal – third place	2020 Guadalajara	–90 kg
IJF Grand Slam
Bronze medal – third place	2017 Abu Dhabi	–90 kg

Profile at external databases
- IJF: 12679
- JudoInside.com: 51974
- Updated on 26 November 2022

Zachary Burt (born 4 September 1993) is a Canadian judoka.

He is the bronze medallist of the 2017 Judo Grand Slam Abu Dhabi in the -90 kg category.

== See also ==
- Judo in Canada
- List of Canadian judoka
