= Quedjau Nhabali =

Ukrainian judoka (born 1990)

Personal information
- Born: 8 July 1990 (age 35) Kyiv, Ukrainian SSR, Soviet Union
- Occupation: Judoka

Sport
- Country: Ukraine
- Sport: Judo
- Weight class: ‍–‍90 kg

Achievements and titles
- Olympic Games: R16 (2020)
- World Champ.: 7th (2014)
- European Champ.: 7th (2016)
Medal record
Men's judo
Representing Ukraine
European Games
Bronze medal – third place	2015 Baku	Men's team
IJF Grand Slam
Silver medal – second place	2020 Düsseldorf	‍–‍90 kg
Bronze medal – third place	2017 Baku	‍–‍90 kg
IJF Grand Prix
Bronze medal – third place	2013 Jeju	‍–‍90 kg
Bronze medal – third place	2014 Astana	‍–‍90 kg
Bronze medal – third place	2018 Agadir	‍–‍90 kg
Bronze medal – third place	2019 Marrakesh	‍–‍90 kg
European U23 Championships
Silver medal – second place	2011 Tyumen	‍–‍90 kg
Silver medal – second place	2012 Prague	‍–‍90 kg
World Juniors Championships
Gold medal – first place	2009 Paris	‍–‍90 kg
European Junior Championships
Bronze medal – third place	2009 Yerevan	‍–‍90 kg

Profile at external databases
- IJF: 1151
- JudoInside.com: 57108
- Updated on 21 November 2022

Quedjau Frantsiskovych Nhabali (Ukrainian: Кеджау Францискович Ньябалі; born 8 July 1990) is a Ukrainian judoka. He competed at the 2016 Summer Olympics in Rio de Janeiro, in the men's 90 kg.
