= David Oganisyan =

Russian sambist

Personal information
- Nationality: Russian
- Born: 12 May 1994 (age 32)
- Weight: 90 kg (200 lb)

Sport
- Sport: Sambo; Judo
- Club: Dynamo Armavir
- Coached by: G. F. Shvetsov; V. G. Pogosyan; A. R. Kitsiants; R. M. Baboyan
Medal record
Men's Sambo
Representing Russia
World Championships
Gold medal – first place	2018 Bucharest	–90 kg
European Championships
Gold medal – first place	2016 Kazan	–90 kg
Russian Championships
Gold medal – first place	2018 Khabarovsk	–90 kg
Silver medal – second place	2016 Petrozavodsk	–90 kg
Bronze medal – third place	2015 St. Petersburg	–90 kg
Men's Judo
Russian Championships
Gold medal – first place	2016 Khabarovsk	–90 kg

David Gagikovich Oganisyan (Russian: Давид Гагикович Оганисян; born 12 May 1994) is a Russian sambo and judo practitioner. He has had more success in sambo in recent years, winning European and World Championships titles in 90 kg. Oganisyan participated in international judo tournaments in early years, in recent years he had some success in regional tournaments. He is of Armenian descent.
