= Sydney Sy Tancontian =

Filipino sambist, judoka and kurash wrestler (born 1999)

Personal information
- National team: Philippines
- Born: January 17, 1999 (age 27)
- Home town: Davao City
- Education: University of Santo Tomas

Sport
- Sport: Judo; Sambo; Kurash
- University team: UST Growling Tigresses (Judo)
Medal record
Representing Philippines
Women's sambo
World Championships
Bronze medal – third place	2018 Bucharest	+80 kg
Bronze medal – third place	2020 Novi Sad	+80 kg
Bronze medal – third place	2023 Yerevan	+80 kg
World Beach Championships
Bronze medal – third place	2024 Casablanca	+72 kg
Asian Championships
Gold medal – first place	2022 Jounieh	+80 kg
Gold medal – first place	2025 Taskhent	+80 kg
Silver medal – second place	2024 Macau	+80 kg
Silver medal – second place	2026 Manila	+80 kg
Women's kurash
SEA Games
Silver medal – second place	2021 Phnom Penh	87 kg
Bronze medal – third place	2019 Philippines	+70 kg
Women's judo
SEA Games
Bronze medal – third place	2017 Kuala Lumpur	‍–‍78 kg

Sydney Sy Tancontian (born January 17, 1999) is a Filipino sambist, judoka and kurash wrestler. She has competed at the SEA Games in judo and kurash, winning medals in both sports. In sambo, she has won three bronze medals at the World Sambo Championships and four medals at the Asian Sambo Championships.

== Career ==
=== Judo ===
Tancontian competed at the 2017 SEA Games, where she won a bronze medal in the 78 kg category. She also represented the UST Growling Tigresses in judo at the University Athletic Association of the Philippines (UAAP), in which she won the gold medal in the +78 kg category and was awarded Rookie of the Year in Seasons 82.

=== Sambo ===
At the 2018 World Sambo Championships held in Bucharest, Romania, Tancontian won a silver medal in the +80 kg division, becoming the first Filipino woman to do so. She then competed at the 2020 World Sambo Championships in +80 kg division, where she won a bronze metal once again. Tancontian competed in the 2022 Asian Sambo Championships held in Jounieh, where she won her first gold medal at the championships. She then competed at the 2023 World Sambo Championships in +80 kg division, where she won her third bronze metal at the championships.

In June 2024, Tancontian returned to the Asian and Oceanian Championships in Macau, where she won a silver medal. At the 2024 World Beach Sambo Championships held in Casablanca, Morocco, she won a bronze medal in the +72 kg event. In April 2025, at Asian and Oceanian Championships held in Tashkent, Tancontian won her second gold medal at the championships. The following month, she reached no. 1 in the FIAS world rankings. At the 2026 Asian and Oceanian Championships held in Manila, Philippines, she competed in the +80 kg category and won the silver medal.

=== Kurash ===
Tancontian competed in kurash at the 2019 SEA Games in the Philippines, in which she won a bronze medal in the +70 kg category. She returned to the SEA Games in the 2021 edition, where she won the silver medal, this time in the 87 kg category.

== Personal life ==
Tancontian comes from a family of athletes. Her father Paolo is the founder and president of Pilipinas Sambo Federation. Her brother Chino is a judoka and sambo athlete.
