= 2023 World Sambo Championships =

Sambo competition

- Location: Yerevan, Armenia
- Dates: 10–12 November 2023

The 2023 World Sambo Championships was the 48th edition of the World Sambo Championships of combined events (men's sambo, women's sambo and men's combat sambo) and was held from 10 to 12 November 2023 in Yerevan, Armenia.

== Medal table ==
* Host nation (Armenia)

Rank	Nation	Gold	Silver	Bronze	Total
1	Uzbekistan (UZB)	2	1	3	6
2	Kazakhstan (KAZ)	1	2	5	8
3	Romania (ROU)	1	2	2	5
4	Kyrgyzstan (KGZ)	1	1	3	5
5	Cameroon (CMR)	1	1	0	2
6	Bulgaria (BUL)	1	0	2	3
7	Armenia (ARM)*	0	5	5	10
8	Mongolia (MGL)	0	3	1	4
9	Croatia (CRO)	0	1	1	2
9	Georgia (GEO)	0	1	1	2
11	Serbia (SRB)	0	1	0	1
12	Tajikistan (TJK)	0	0	3	3
13	Ukraine (UKR)	0	0	2	2
14	Greece (GRE)	0	0	1	1
14	Latvia (LAT)	0	0	1	1
14	Morocco (MAR)	0	0	1	1
14	Netherlands (NED)	0	0	1	1
14	Philippines (PHI)	0	0	1	1
14	Slovenia (SLO)	0	0	1	1
14	Turkmenistan (TKM)	0	0	1	1
Totals (20 entries)		7	18	35	60

== Medal summary ==
=== Men's events ===
Event	Gold	Silver	Bronze
−58 kg	Sayan Khertek; FIAS	Vakhtangi Chidrashvili (GEO)	Uladzisau Burdz; FIAS
−58 kg	Sayan Khertek; FIAS	Vakhtangi Chidrashvili (GEO)	Akmaliddin Karimov (TJK)
−64 kg	Vladimir Leontev; FIAS	Belek Barakanov (KGZ)	Sumiya Lkhagvasuren (MGL)
−64 kg	Vladimir Leontev; FIAS	Belek Barakanov (KGZ)	Savvas Karakizidis (GRE)
−71 kg	Ramed Gukev; FIAS	Aram Aghajanyan (ARM)	Sarbon Ernazarov (UZB)
−71 kg	Ramed Gukev; FIAS	Aram Aghajanyan (ARM)	Arnur Kuatay (KAZ)
−79 kg	Ivan Harkov (BUL)	Boris Shatveryan (ARM)	Egor Sukhoparov; FIAS
−79 kg	Ivan Harkov (BUL)	Boris Shatveryan (ARM)	Begench Baltayev (TKM)
−88 kg	Zhamalbek Uulu Asylbek (KGZ)	Yelaman Koishybayev (KAZ)	Vahagn Chalyan (ARM)
−88 kg	Zhamalbek Uulu Asylbek (KGZ)	Yelaman Koishybayev (KAZ)	Tin Straza (CRO)
−98 kg	Anton Konovalov; FIAS	Davit Grigoryan (ARM)	Alibek Zekenov (KAZ)
−98 kg	Anton Konovalov; FIAS	Davit Grigoryan (ARM)	Daviti Loriashvili (GEO)
+98 kg	Artem Osipenko; FIAS	Ilie Natea (ROU)	Bekbolot Toktogonov (KGZ)
+98 kg	Artem Osipenko; FIAS	Ilie Natea (ROU)	Viktors Resko (LAT)

Source Results

=== Women's events ===
Event	Gold	Silver	Bronze
−50 kg	Gulsevar Urakova (UZB)	Margarita Bazhayeva (KAZ)	Anfisa Kapayeva; FIAS
−50 kg	Gulsevar Urakova (UZB)	Margarita Bazhayeva (KAZ)	Cristina Blanaru (ROU)
−54 kg	Elmira Kakhramanova; FIAS	Khrystyna Bondar (ROU)	Guldana Almukhanbetova (KAZ)
−54 kg	Elmira Kakhramanova; FIAS	Khrystyna Bondar (ROU)	Varsik Grigoryan (ARM)
−59 kg	Ibodatkhon Agojonova (UZB)	Nomintuya Enkhbaatar (MGL)	Tatsiana Matsko; FIAS
−59 kg	Ibodatkhon Agojonova (UZB)	Nomintuya Enkhbaatar (MGL)	Svetlana Uvarova; FIAS
−65 kg	Daniela Zhdan; FIAS	Sunjidmaa Tsog-Ochir (MGL)	Sem Van Dun (NED)
−65 kg	Daniela Zhdan; FIAS	Sunjidmaa Tsog-Ochir (MGL)	Anna-Mariya Manusheva (BUL)
−72 kg	Kseniia Zadvornova; FIAS	Anzhela Zhylinsskaya; FIAS	Shynar Abatova (KAZ)
−72 kg	Kseniia Zadvornova; FIAS	Anzhela Zhylinsskaya; FIAS	Volha Maleika (ROU)
−80 kg	Katerina Moskalova (ROU)	Katarina Lea Gobec (COR)	Halyna Kovalska (UKR)
−80 kg	Katerina Moskalova (ROU)	Katarina Lea Gobec (COR)	Daria Rechkalova; FIAS
+80 kg	Arailym Abenova (KAZ)	Zhanara Kusanova; FIAS	Lauryne Lage; FIAS
+80 kg	Arailym Abenova (KAZ)	Zhanara Kusanova; FIAS	Sydney Sy (PHI)

Source Results

=== Combat Sambo Events ===
Event	Gold	Silver	Bronze
−58 kg	Mukhtar Gamzaev] FIAS	Togtokhbayar Nyamkhuu (MGL)	Bobokhon Mirzozoda (TJK)
−58 kg	Mukhtar Gamzaev] FIAS	Togtokhbayar Nyamkhuu (MGL)	Lutfilla Saydamatov (UZB)
−64 kg	Sheikh-Mansur Khabibulaev; FIAS	Vahram Grigoryan (ARM)	Saiak Barakanov (KGZ)
−64 kg	Sheikh-Mansur Khabibulaev; FIAS	Vahram Grigoryan (ARM)	Mukhammadali Sadullaev (UZB)
−71 kg	Rustam Taldiev; FIAS	Stefan Zuparic (SRB)	Vachik Vardanyan (ARM)
−71 kg	Rustam Taldiev; FIAS	Stefan Zuparic (SRB)	Khudoyor Rajabzoda (TJK)
−79 kg	Zagid Gaidarov; FIAS	Furkat Ruziev (UZB)	Luka Perkovic (SLO)
−79 kg	Zagid Gaidarov; FIAS	Furkat Ruziev (UZB)	Sargis Vardanyan (TJK)
−88 kg	Said Saidov; FIAS	Avetik Poghosyan (ARM)	Mustapha Mouknaj (MAR)
−88 kg	Said Saidov; FIAS	Avetik Poghosyan (ARM)	Bekten Uulu Erkebai (KGZ)
−98 kg	Seidou Njimouluh (CMR)	Abdulkhalim Dzhavatkhanov; FIAS	Anatoliy Voloshinov (UKR)
−98 kg	Seidou Njimouluh (CMR)	Abdulkhalim Dzhavatkhanov; FIAS	Arman Avanesyan (ARM)
+98 kg	Mikhail Kashurnikov; FIAS	Maxwell Djantou (CMR)	Talgat Zhiyentayev (KAZ)
+98 kg	Mikhail Kashurnikov; FIAS	Maxwell Djantou (CMR)	Delian Alishahi (BUL)

Source Results
