= Ciril Grossklaus =

Swiss judoka (born 1991)

Personal information
- Born: 17 April 1991 (age 35)
- Occupation: Judoka
- Website: www.ciril-grossklaus.ch

Sport
- Country: Switzerland
- Sport: Judo
- Weight class: ‍–‍90 kg

Achievements and titles
- Olympic Games: R32 (2016)
- World Champ.: R16 (2014, 2019, 2021)
- European Champ.: 7th (2019)
Medal record
Men's judo
Representing Switzerland
IJF Grand Slam
Bronze medal – third place	2014 Abu Dhabi	‍–‍90 kg
IJF Grand Prix
Silver medal – second place	2018 Agadir	‍–‍90 kg
Bronze medal – third place	2013 Miami	‍–‍90 kg
Bronze medal – third place	2013 Rijeka	‍–‍90 kg
Bronze medal – third place	2016 Havana	‍–‍90 kg

Profile at external databases
- IJF: 3354
- JudoInside.com: 49938
- Updated on 23 November 2022

Ciril Grossklaus (born 17 April 1991) is a Swiss judoka.

Grossklaus competed at the 2016 Summer Olympics in Rio de Janeiro, in the men's 90 kg.
