= 2023 World Judo Championships – Women's 63 kg =

Judo competition

Judo Women's 63 kg at the 2023 World Judo Championships
- Venue: Ali Bin Hamad Al Attiya Arena
- Location: Doha, Qatar
- Date: 10 May 2023
- Competitors: 46 from 38 nations
- Total prize money: €57,000

Medalists
gold medal	Clarisse Agbegnenou (6th title)	France
silver medal	Andreja Leški	Slovenia
bronze medal	Szofi Özbas	Hungary
bronze medal	Joanne van Lieshout	Netherlands

Competition at external databases
- Links: IJF • JudoInside

The Women's 63 kg event at the 2023 World Judo Championships was held at the Ali Bin Hamad al-Attiyah Arena in Doha, Qatar on 10 May 2023.

== Results ==
=== Finals ===
Semi-finals
(Netherlands) Joanne van Lieshout	00
(Slovenia) Andreja Leški	01
(France) Clarisse Agbegnenou	11
(Austria) Lubjana Piovesana	00

Final
(Slovenia) Andreja Leški	00
(France) Clarisse Agbegnenou	02

=== Repechage ===
Repechage
(Hungary) Szofi Özbas	10
(Kosovo) Laura Fazliu	00
(Canada) Catherine Beauchemin-Pinard	00
(Mexico) Prisca Awiti Alcaraz	01

Bronze medal
(Hungary) Szofi Özbas	01
(Austria) Lubjana Piovesana	00
(Mexico) Prisca Awiti Alcaraz	00
(Netherlands) Joanne van Lieshout	02

=== Pool A ===
First round
(Netherlands) Joanne van Lieshout	10
(Colombia) Cindy Mera	00
(South Korea) Shin Chae-won	10
(Romania) Florentina Ivănescu	00
(United States) Sara Golden	00
(Italy) Flavia Favorini	10

Round of 32
(United Kingdom) Lucy Renshall	00
(Netherlands) Joanne van Lieshout	10
(South Korea) Shin Chae-won	00
(Japan) Miku Takaichi	10
(Venezuela) Anriquelis Barrios	10
(Italy) Flavia Favorini	00
(Hungary) Szofi Özbas	10
(Spain) Cristina Cabaña	00

Round of 16
(Netherlands) Joanne van Lieshout	01
(Japan) Miku Takaichi	00
(Venezuela) Anriquelis Barrios	00
(Hungary) Szofi Özbas	10

Quarter-finals
(Netherlands) Joanne van Lieshout	10
(Hungary) Szofi Özbas	00

=== Pool B ===
First round
(Portugal) Bárbara Timo	01
(Austria) Magdalena Krssakova	00
(Kosovo) Laura Fazliu	10
(Central African Republic) Nadia Matchiko Guimendego	00
(Czech Republic) Renata Zachová	00
(Israel) Inbal Shemesh	10
(Slovenia) Andreja Leški	01
(China) Tang Jing	00

Round of 32
(Brazil) Ketleyn Quadros	11
(Portugal) Bárbara Timo	01
(Kosovo) Laura Fazliu	01
(Croatia) Iva Oberan	00
(Poland) Angelika Szymańska	00
(Israel) Inbal Shemesh	10
(Slovenia) Andreja Leški	10
Nigara Shaheen	00

Round of 16
(Brazil) Ketleyn Quadros	00
(Kosovo) Laura Fazliu	02
(Israel) Inbal Shemesh	00
(Slovenia) Andreja Leški	10

Quarter-finals
(Kosovo) Laura Fazliu	00
(Slovenia) Andreja Leški	02

=== Pool C ===
First round
(Brazil) Gabriella Moraes	01
(South Korea) Kim Ji-jeong	00
(United Kingdom) Gemma Howell	10
(Cape Verde) Carolina Francês	00
(Algeria) Amina Belkadi	00
(Turkmenistan) Zülhumar Daşkinowa	10
(France) Clarisse Agbegnenou	10
(Serbia) Anja Obradović	00

Round of 32
(Canada) Catherine Beauchemin-Pinard	10
(Brazil) Gabriella Moraes	00
(United Kingdom) Gemma Howell	10
(Argentina) Agustina De Lucía	00
(Israel) Gili Sharir	11
(Turkmenistan) Zülhumar Daşkinowa	00
(France) Clarisse Agbegnenou	10
(Cuba) Maylín del Toro Carvajal	00

Round of 16
(Canada) Catherine Beauchemin-Pinard	10
(United Kingdom) Gemma Howell	00
(Israel) Gili Sharir	00
(France) Clarisse Agbegnenou	01

Quarter-finals
(Canada) Catherine Beauchemin-Pinard	00
(France) Clarisse Agbegnenou	02

=== Pool D ===
First round
(Georgia (country)) Eter Askilashvili	00
(Angola) Diassonema Mucungui	01
(Croatia) Katarina Krišto	00
(Mexico) Prisca Awiti Alcaraz	10
(Austria) Lubjana Piovesana	10
(United States) Hannah Martin	00

Round of 32
(Japan) Megumi Horikawa	02
(Angola) Diassonema Mucungui	00
(Mexico) Prisca Awiti Alcaraz	02
(Cameroon) Audrey Jeannette Etoua Biock	00
(Australia) Katharina Haecker	00
(Austria) Lubjana Piovesana	10
(Kazakhstan) Esmigul Kuyulova	00
Kamila Badurova	10

Round of 16
(Japan) Megumi Horikawa	00
(Mexico) Prisca Awiti Alcaraz	01
(Austria) Lubjana Piovesana	01
Kamila Badurova	00

Quarter-finals
(Mexico) Prisca Awiti Alcaraz	00
(Austria) Lubjana Piovesana	10

== Prize money ==
The sums listed bring the total prizes awarded to €57,000 for the individual event.

Medal	Total	Judoka	Coach
Gold	€26,000	€20,800	€5,200
Silver	€15,000	€12,000	€3,000
Bronze	€8,000	€6,400	€1,600
