= 2024 European Judo Championships – Women's 63 kg =

Judo competition

Judo Women's 63 kg at the 2024 European Judo Championships
- Venue: Arena Zagreb
- Location: Zagreb, Croatia
- Date: 26 April 2024

Medalists
gold medal	Renata Zachová (1st title)	Czech Republic
silver medal	Joanne van Lieshout	Netherlands
bronze medal	Savita Russo	Italy
bronze medal	Andreja Leški	Slovenia

Competition at external databases
- Links: IJF • JudoInside

The Women's 63 kg event at the 2024 European Judo Championships was held at the Arena Zagreb in Zagreb, Croatia on 26 April 2024.

== Results ==
=== Finals ===
Semi-finals
(Czech Republic) Renata Zachová	01 (yellow card)
(Slovenia) Andreja Leški	00
(Croatia) Katarina Krišto	00
(Netherlands) Joanne van Lieshout	01 (yellow card)

Final
(Czech Republic) Renata Zachová	10
(Netherlands) Joanne van Lieshout	01

=== Repechage ===
Repechage
(Italy) Savita Russo	10 (yellow card)
(Germany) Dena Pohl	00
(Romania) Amanda Zuaznabar-Torres	00 (yellow card)
(Austria) Lubjana Piovesana	10 (yellow card)

Bronze medal
(Italy) Savita Russo	10
(Croatia) Katarina Krišto	00
(Austria) Lubjana Piovesana	00
(Slovenia) Andreja Leški	10 (yellow card)

=== Pool A ===
First round
(Denmark) Helene Christensen	00
(Croatia) Iva Oberan	10

Round of 32
(Israel) Gili Sharir	00 (yellow card)
(Spain) Cristina Cabaña	02 (yellow card)
(Croatia) Iva Oberan	00
(Italy) Savita Russo	01
(Czech Republic) Renata Zachová	10
(Belgium) Alessia Corrao	00
(Romania) Florentina Ivănescu	00
(Austria) Magdalena Krssakova	10

Round of 16
(Spain) Cristina Cabaña	00 (yellow card)
(Italy) Savita Russo	01 (yellow card)
(Czech Republic) Renata Zachová	10
(Austria) Magdalena Krssakova	00

Quarter-finals
(Italy) Savita Russo	00
(Czech Republic) Renata Zachová	10

=== Pool B ===
First round
Nigara Shaheen	00
(Turkey) Habibe Afyonlu	11

Round of 32
(Slovenia) Andreja Leški	10
(Serbia) Anja Obradović	00 (yellow card)
(Turkey) Habibe Afyonlu	00
(Netherlands) Geke van den Berg	01 (yellow card)
(Israel) Inbal Shemesh	01
Dali Liluashvili	00 (yellow card)
(Germany) Dena Pohl	02
(Ukraine) Yuliia Hrebenozhko	01 (yellow card)

Round of 16
(Slovenia) Andreja Leški	01 (yellow card)
(Netherlands) Geke van den Berg	00 (yellow card)
(Israel) Inbal Shemesh	00
(Germany) Dena Pohl	01

Quarter-finals
(Slovenia) Andreja Leški	02
(Germany) Dena Pohl	00

=== Pool C ===
First round
(Romania) Amanda Zuaznabar-Torres	10
(Bosnia and Herzegovina) Anđela Samardžić	00

Round of 32
(Hungary) Szofi Özbas	00
(Romania) Amanda Zuaznabar-Torres	10 (yellow card)
(Serbia) Jovana Bunčić	00
(Poland) Natalia Kropska	02
(Croatia) Katarina Krišto	10
(Germany) Agatha Schmidt	00 (yellow card)
(France) Manon Deketer	10 (yellow card)
Kamila Badurova	00

Round of 16
(Romania) Amanda Zuaznabar-Torres	01 (yellow card)
(Poland) Natalia Kropska	00
(Croatia) Katarina Krišto	01
(France) Manon Deketer	00 (yellow card)

Quarter-finals
(Romania) Amanda Zuaznabar-Torres	00 (yellow card)
(Croatia) Katarina Krišto	01 (yellow card)

=== Pool D ===
First round
(Moldova) Daniela Tcaci	11
(Georgia (country)) Eter Askilashvili	00
(Italy) Flavia Favorini	01
(Spain) Laura Vázquez	00

Round of 32
(Netherlands) Joanne van Lieshout	01
(Bulgaria) Yoana Manova	00 (yellow card)
(Moldova) Daniela Tcaci	00 (yellow card)
Yana Makretskaya	10
(Austria) Lubjana Piovesana	11 (yellow card)
(Ukraine) Anastasiia Antipina	00 (yellow card)
(Italy) Flavia Favorini	10 (yellow card)
(Czech Republic) Věra Zemanová	00

Round of 16
(Netherlands) Joanne van Lieshout	10
Yana Makretskaya	00 (yellow card)
(Austria) Lubjana Piovesana	01
(Italy) Flavia Favorini	00 (yellow card)

Quarter-finals
(Netherlands) Joanne van Lieshout	10
(Austria) Lubjana Piovesana	00 (yellow card)
