= Judo at the 2024 Summer Olympics – Mixed team =

Judo Mixed team at the Games of the XXXIII Olympiad
- Venue: Grand Palais Éphémère
- Location: Paris, France
- Date: 3 August 2024
- Competitors: 181 from 19 nations
- Website: Official website

Medalists
gold medal	Shirine Boukli; Joan-Benjamin Gaba; Amandine Buchard; Walide Khyar; Sarah-Léonie Cysique; Luka Mkheidze; Clarisse Agbegnenou; Alpha Oumar Djalo; Marie-Ève Gahié; Maxime-Gaël Ngayap Hambou; Romane Dicko; Aurélien Diesse; Madeleine Malonga; Teddy Riner	France
silver medal	Uta Abe; Hifumi Abe; Haruka Funakubo; Soichi Hashimoto; Natsumi Tsunoda; Ryuju Nagayama; Saki Niizoe; Sanshiro Murao; Miku Takaichi; Takanori Nagase; Aaron Wolf; Rika Takayama; Akira Sone; Tatsuru Saito	Japan
bronze medal	Daniel Cargnin; Leonardo Gonçalves; Willian Lima; Rafael Macedo; Guilherme Schimidt; Rafael Silva; Larissa Pimenta; Ketleyn Quadros; Rafaela Silva; Beatriz Souza	Brazil
bronze medal	Lee Hye-kyeong; Kim Won-jin; Jung Ye-rin; An Ba-ul; Huh Mi-mi; Kim Ji-su; Lee Joon-hwan; Han Ju-yeop; Yoon Hyun-ji; Kim Ha-yun; Kim Min-jong	South Korea

Champions
- Mixed team: France (2nd title)

Competition at external databases
- Links: IJF • JudoInside

The mixed team competition in judo at the 2024 Summer Olympics was held on 3 August 2024, at the Grand Palais Éphémère in Paris. The weight limit for each class was 5% above the regular limits. If their country is qualified for the mixed-team event, all athletes who qualify in the individual competition can take part, i.e. up to 7 women and 7 men.

== Summary ==
this is the second appearance of the mixed team event.

France defend their title by beating Japan in the final, Israel lost to France, and Germany lost to Japan, later, Germany lost to South Korea (a.k.a Republic of Korea).

== Participants ==
19 nations will participate in the 2024 Mixed Team Judo Summer Olympics. The selected Judoka are:

Teams	Men			Women		
Teams	‍–‍73 kg	‍–‍90 kg	+90 kg	‍–‍57 kg	‍–‍70 kg	+70 kg
Austria (AUT)	Samuel Gaßner	Wachid Borchashvili	Aaron Fara	Katharina Tanzer	Lubjana Piovesana	Michaela Polleres
Brazil (BRA)	Daniel Cargnin Willian Lima	Rafael Macedo Guilherme Schimidt	Leonardo Gonçalves Rafael Silva	Larissa Pimenta Rafaela Silva	Ketleyn Quadros	Beatriz Souza
Canada (CAN)	Arthur Margelidon	François Gauthier-Drapeau	Shady Elnahas	Christa Deguchi Kelly Deguchi	Catherine Beauchemin-Pinard	Ana Laura Portuondo-Isasi
Refugee Olympic Team (EOR)	Mohammad Rashnonezhad	Arab Sibghatullah	Adnan Khankan	Muna Dahouk	Nigara Shaheen	Mahboubeh Barbari Zharfi
Spain (ESP)	Salvador Cases David García Torné	Tristani Mosakhlishvili	Nikoloz Sherazadishvili	Laura Martínez Ariane Toro	Cristina Cabaña	Ai Tsunoda
France (FRA)	J-B Gaba Walide Khyar Luka Mkheidze	M-G Ngayap Hambou Alpha Oumar Djalo	Teddy Riner Aurélien Diesse	Sarah-Léonie Cysique Amandine Buchard Shirine Boukli	Marie-Ève Gahié Clarisse Agbegnenou	Romane Dicko Madeleine Malonga
Georgia (GEO)	Vazha Margvelashvili Giorgi Sardalashvili Lasha Shavdatuashvili	Lasha Bekauri; Tato Grigalashvili	Ilia Sulamanidze ~~Guram Tushishvili~~	Eteri Liparteliani	Eter Askilashvili	Sophio Somkhishvili
Germany (GER)	Igor Wandtke	Timo Cavelius; Eduard Trippel	Erik Abramov	Mascha Ballhaus Katharina Menz; Pauline Starke	Miriam Butkereit	Renée Lucht Anna-Maria Wagner
Hungary (HUN)	Bence Pongrácz	Krisztián Tóth Attila Ungvári	Zsombor Vég	Réka Pupp	Szofi Özbas	Szabina Gercsák
Israel (ISR)	Tohar Butbul Baruch Shmailov Yam Wolczak	Sagi Muki	Peter Paltchik	Timna Nelson-Levy Gefen Primo Shira Rishony	Maya Goshen Gili Sharir	Raz Hershko Inbar Lanir
Italy (ITA)	Andrea Carlino Manuel Lombardo Matteo Piras	Antonio Esposito Christian Parlati	Gennaro Pirelli	Odette Giuffrida Assunta Scutto Veronica Toniolo	Kim Polling Savita Russo	Alice Bellandi Asya Tavano
Japan (JPN)	Soichi Hashimoto Hifumi Abe Ryuju Nagayama	Sanshiro Murao Takanori Nagase	Tatsuru Saito Aaron Wolf	Haruka Funakubo Uta Abe Natsumi Tsunoda	Saki Niizoe Miku Takaichi	Akira Sone Rika Takayama
Kazakhstan (KAZ)	Gusman Kyrgyzbayev Daniyar Shamshayev Yeldos Smetov	Abylaikhan Zhubanazar	Nurlykhan Sharkhan	Abiba Abuzhakynova	Esmigul Kuyulova	Kamila Berlikash
South Korea (KOR)	An Ba-ul Kim Won-jin	Han Ju-yeop Lee Joon-hwan	Kim Min-jong	Huh Mi-mi Jung Ye-rin Lee Hye-kyeong	Kim Ji-su	Kim Ha-yun Yoon Hyun-ji
Mongolia (MGL)	Enkhtaivany Ariunbold Yondonperenlein Baskhüü	Batzayaagiin Erdenebayar	Batkhuyagiin Gonchigsüren Odkhüügiin Tsetsentsengel	Bavuudorjiin Baasankhüü Lkhagvasürengiin Sosorbaram	Lkhagvatogoogiin Enkhriilen	Amarsaikhany Adiyaasüren Otgonbayaryn Khüslen
Netherlands (NED)	Tornike Tsjakadoea	Frank de Wit; Noël van 't End	Michael Korrel; Jelle Snippe	Julie Beurskens	Sanne van Dijke Joanne van Lieshout	Marit Kamps; Guusje Steenhuis
Serbia (SRB)	Strahinja Bunčić	Nemanja Majdov	Aleksandar Kukolj	Milica Nikolić	Marica Perišić	Milica Žabić
Turkey (TUR)	Muhammed Demirel Salih Yıldız	Vedat Albayrak Mihael Žgank	İbrahim Tataroğlu	Tuğçe Beder	Fidan Ögel	Kayra Özdemir
Uzbekistan (UZB)	Sardor Nurillaev Doston Ruziev Murodjon Yuldoshev	Davlat Bobonov Sharofiddin Boltaboev	Muzaffarbek Turoboyev Alisher Yusupov	Shukurjon Aminova Diyora Keldiyorova Khalimajon Kurbonova	Gulnoza Matniyazova	Iriskhon Kurbanbaeva

== Results ==
=== Main bracket ===
First round
Spain	4
Refugee Olympic Team	0
Mongolia	3
Israel	4
Italy	4
Hungary	1

Round of 16
Japan	4
Spain	3
Netherlands	2
Serbia	4
Germany	4
Austria	1
Kazakhstan	2
Brazil	4
France	4
Israel	0
South Korea	4
Turkey	1
Georgia	3
Italy	4
Uzbekistan	4
Canada	0

Quarter-finals
Japan	4
Serbia	1
Germany	4
Brazil	3
France	4
South Korea	1
Italy	4
Uzbekistan	2

Semi-finals
Japan	4
Germany	0
France	4
Italy	1

Final
Japan	3
France	4

=== Repechage ===
Repechage
Serbia	1
Brazil	4
South Korea	4
Uzbekistan	2

Bronze medal
Brazil	4
Italy	3
South Korea	4
Germany	3

== Matches ==
=== First round ===
==== Spain vs Refugee Olympic Team ====
Weight Class	Spain (ESP)	Result	Refugee Olympic Team (EOR)	Score
Men +90 kg	Nikoloz Sherazadishvili	10 – 00 (yellow card)	Adnan Khankan	1 – 0
Women –57 kg	Ariane Toro	10 – 00	Muna Dahouk	2 – 0
Men –73 kg	David García Torné	10 (yellow card) – 00 (yellow card)	Mohammad Rashnonezhad	3 – 0
Women –70 kg	Cristina Cabaña	10 – 00	Nigara Shaheen	4 – 0
Men -90 kg	Tristani Mosakhlishvili	—	Arab Sibghatullah	—
Women +70 kg	Ai Tsunoda	—	Mahboubeh Barbari Zharfi	—
Results

==== Mongolia vs Israel ====
Weight Class	Mongolia (MGL)	Result	Israel (ISR)	Score
Men +90 kg	Batkhuyagiin Gonchigsüren	01 – 10	Peter Paltchik	0 – 1
Women –57 kg	Lkhagvasürengiin Sosorbaram	00 – 10 (yellow card)	Timna Nelson-Levy	0 – 2
Men –73 kg	Yondonperenlein Baskhüü	00 (yellow card) – 10	Tohar Butbul	0 – 3
Women –70 kg	Lkhagvatogoogiin Enkhriilen	10 – 00	Gili Sharir	1 – 3
Men -90 kg	Batzayaagiin Erdenebayar	10 – 00 (yellow card)	Sagi Muki	2 – 3
Women +70 kg	Amarsaikhany Adiyaasüren	01 – 00	Raz Hershko	3 – 3
Men -90 kg	Batzayaagiin Erdenebayar	00 (yellow card) – 01	Sagi Muki	3 – 4
Results

==== Italy vs Hungary ====
Weight Class	Italy (ITA)	Result	Hungary (HUN)	Score
Men +90 kg	Gennaro Pirelli	01 – 00 (yellow card)	Zsombor Vég	1 – 0
Women –57 kg	Veronica Toniolo	10 (yellow card) – 00	Réka Pupp	2 – 0
Men –73 kg	Manuel Lombardo	10 – 00 H	Bence Pongrácz	3 – 0
Women –70 kg	Kim Polling	00 – 01	Szofi Özbas	3 – 1
Men -90 kg	Christian Parlati	10 – 00	Krisztián Tóth	4 – 1
Women +70 kg	Asya Tavano	—	Szabina Gercsák	—
Results

=== Round of 16 ===
==== Japan vs Spain ====
Weight Class	Japan (JPN)	Result	Spain (ESP)	Score
Women –57 kg	Uta Abe	10 (yellow card) – 01 (yellow card)	Ariane Toro	1 – 0
Men –73 kg	Soichi Hashimoto	00 – 10	Salvador Cases	1 – 1
Women –70 kg	Miku Takaichi	10 – 00 (yellow card)	Cristina Cabaña	2 – 1
Men –90 kg	Sanshiro Murao	01 (yellow card) – 00 (yellow card)	Tristani Mosakhlishvili	3 – 1
Women +70 kg	Rika Takayama	00 – 10 (yellow card)	Ai Tsunoda	3 – 2
Men +90 kg	Tatsuru Saito	00 – 01	Nikoloz Sherazadishvili	3 – 3
Women –70 kg	Miku Takaichi	10 – 00 (yellow card)	Cristina Cabaña	4 – 3
Results

==== Netherlands vs Serbia ====
Weight Class	Netherlands (NED)	Result	Serbia (SRB)	Score
Women –57 kg	Julie Beurskens	10 – 00	Milica Nikolić	1 – 0
Men –73 kg	Tornike Tsjakadoea	00 (yellow card) – 10	Strahinja Bunčić	1 – 1
Women –70 kg	Joanne van Lieshout	10 – 00	Marica Perišić	2 – 1
Men –90 kg	Noël van 't End	00 – 10	Nemanja Majdov	2 – 2
Women +70 kg	Marit Kamps	00 – 10	Milica Žabić	2 – 3
Men +90 kg	Michael Korrel	00 – 10	Aleksandar Kukolj	2 – 4
Results

==== Germany vs Austria ====
Weight Class	Germany (GER)	Result	Austria (AUT)	Score
Women –57 kg	Pauline Starke	10 – 00	Katharina Tanzer	1 – 0
Men –73 kg	Igor Wandtke	00 (yellow card) – 10 (yellow card)	Samuel Gaßner	1 – 1
Women –70 kg	Miriam Butkereit	10 – 00	Lubjana Piovesana	2 – 1
Men -90 kg	Eduard Trippel	10 – 00	Wachid Borchashvili	3 – 1
Women +70 kg	Renée Lucht	11 (yellow card) – 00 (yellow card)	Michaela Polleres	4 – 1
Men +90 kg	Erik Abramov	—	Aaron Fara	—
Results

==== Kazakhstan vs Brazil ====
Weight Class	Kazakhstan (KAZ)	Result	Brazil (BRA)	Score
Women –57 kg	Abiba Abuzhakynova	00 (yellow card) – 11 (yellow card)	Rafaela Silva	0 – 1
Men –73 kg	Daniyar Shamshayev	10 – 01	Daniel Cargnin	1 – 1
Women –70 kg	Esmigul Kuyulova	00 – 10	Ketleyn Quadros	1 – 2
Men –90 kg	Abylaikhan Zhubanazar	10 (yellow card) – 01	Rafael Macedo	2 – 2
Women +70 kg	Kamila Berlikash	00 (yellow card) – 01	Beatriz Souza	2 – 3
Men +90 kg	Nurlykhan Sharkhan	00 (yellow card) – 11	Leonardo Gonçalves	2 – 4
Results

==== France vs Israel ====
Weight Class	France (FRA)	Result	Israel (ISR)	Score
Women –57 kg	Sarah-Léonie Cysique	10 – 01	Timna Nelson-Levy	1 – 0
Men –73 kg	Joan-Benjamin Gaba	10 (yellow card) – 00	Tohar Butbul	2 – 0
Women –70 kg	Marie-Ève Gahié	10 – 00 (yellow card)	Gili Sharir	3 – 0
Men -90 kg	Maxime-Gaël Ngayap Hambou	10 – 00	Sagi Muki	4 – 0
Women +70 kg	Romane Dicko	—	Raz Hershko	—
Men +90 kg	Teddy Riner	—	Peter Paltchik	—
Results

==== South Korea vs Türkiye ====
Weight Class	South Korea (KOR)	Result	Turkey (TUR)	Score
Women –57 kg	Huh Mi-mi	10 – 00	Tuğçe Beder	1 – 0
Men –73 kg	An Ba-ul	10 – 00 (yellow card)	Muhammed Demirel	2 – 0
Women –70 kg	Kim Ji-su	11 (yellow card) – 00 (yellow card)	Fidan Ögel	3 – 0
Men -90 kg	Han Ju-yeop	00 – 10	Mihael Žgank	3 – 1
Women +70 kg	Kim Ha-yun	01 – 00	Kayra Özdemir	4 – 1
Men +90 kg	Kim Min-jong	—	İbrahim Tataroğlu	—
Results

==== Georgia vs Italy ====
Weight Class	Georgia (GEO)	Result	Italy (ITA)	Score
Women –57 kg	Eteri Liparteliani	10 – 00	Odette Giuffrida	1 – 0
Men –73 kg	Lasha Shavdatuashvili	00 – 10	Manuel Lombardo	1 – 1
Women –70 kg	Eter Askilashvili	00 (yellow card) – 10	Kim Polling	1 – 2
Men -90 kg	Lasha Bekauri	10 (yellow card) – 00	Christian Parlati	2 – 2
Women +70 kg	~~Sophio Somkhishvili~~	00 H – 10 (yellow card)	Alice Bellandi	2 – 3
Men +90 kg	Ilia Sulamanidze	10 – 00 (yellow card)	Gennaro Pirelli	3 – 3
Men –73 kg	Lasha Shavdatuashvili	00 (yellow card) – 01	Manuel Lombardo	3 – 4
Results

==== Uzbekistan vs Canada ====
Weight Class	Uzbekistan (UZB)	Result	Canada (CAN)	Score
Women –57 kg	Shukurjon Aminova	10 – 00 H	Christa Deguchi	1 – 0
Men –73 kg	Murodjon Yuldoshev	01 (yellow card) – 00	Arthur Margelidon	2 – 0
Women –70 kg	Gulnoza Matniyazova	10 (yellow card) – 00	Catherine Beauchemin-Pinard	3 – 0
Men -90 kg	Davlat Bobonov	01 – 00	François Gauthier-Drapeau	4 – 0
Women +70 kg	Iriskhon Kurbanbaeva	—	Ana Laura Portuondo Isasi	—
Men +90 kg	Alisher Yusupov	—	Shady Elnahas	—
Results

=== Quarterfinals ===
==== Japan vs Serbia ====
Weight Class	Japan (JPN)	Result	Serbia (SRB)	Score
Men –73 kg	Hifumi Abe	10 (yellow card) – 00	Strahinja Bunčić	1 – 0
Women –70 kg	Saki Niizoe	11 (yellow card) – 00 (yellow card)	Marica Perišić	2 – 0
Men –90 kg	Takanori Nagase	10 (yellow card) – 00	Nemanja Majdov	3 – 0
Women +70 kg	Rika Takayama	00 (yellow card) – 10	Milica Žabić	3 – 1
Men +90 kg	Aaron Wolf	10 – 00	Aleksandar Kukolj	4 – 1
Women –57 kg	Haruka Funakubo	—	Milica Nikolić	—
Results

==== Germany vs Brazil ====
Weight Class	Germany (GER)	Result	Brazil (BRA)	Score
Men –73 kg	Igor Wandtke	10 – 00 (yellow card)	Daniel Cargnin	1 – 0
Women –70 kg	Miriam Butkereit	10 – 00	Ketleyn Quadros	2 – 0
Men –90 kg	Eduard Trippel	01 (yellow card) – 10 (yellow card)	Rafael Macedo	2 – 1
Women +70 kg	Renée Lucht	00 – 01	Beatriz Souza	2 – 2
Men +90 kg	Erik Abramov	10 – 00	Leonardo Gonçalves	3 – 2
Women –57 kg	Pauline Starke	00 – 10	Rafaela Silva	3 – 3
Men +90 kg	Erik Abramov	01 – 00	Leonardo Gonçalves	4 – 3
Results

==== France vs South Korea ====
Weight Class	France (FRA)	Result	South Korea (KOR)	Score
Men –73 kg	Joan-Benjamin Gaba	10 (yellow card) – 00	An Ba-ul	1 – 0
Women –70 kg	Marie-Ève Gahié	00 – 10	Kim Ji-su	1 – 1
Men –90 kg	Maxime-Gaël Ngayap Hambou	11 (yellow card) – 01 (yellow card)	Han Ju-yeop	2 – 1
Women +70 kg	Romane Dicko	10 – 00 (yellow card)	Kim Ha-yun	3 – 1
Men +90 kg	Teddy Riner	10 – 00	Lee Joon-hwan	4 – 1
Women –57 kg	Sarah-Léonie Cysique	—	Huh Mi-mi	—
Results

==== Italy vs Uzbekistan ====
Weight Class	Italy (ITA)	Result	Uzbekistan (UZB)	Score
Men –73 kg	Manuel Lombardo	00 – 10 (yellow card)	Murodjon Yuldoshev	0 – 1
Women –70 kg	Savita Russo	00 (yellow card) – 01	Gulnoza Matniyazova	0 – 2
Men –90 kg	Christian Parlati	10 – 00	Davlat Bobonov	1 – 2
Women +70 kg	Alice Bellandi	10 (yellow card) – 00 (yellow card)	Iriskhon Kurbanbaeva	2 – 2
Men +90 kg	Gennaro Pirelli	10 (yellow card) – 00	Alisher Yusupov	3 – 2
Women –57 kg	Veronica Toniolo	10 – 00	Shukurjon Aminova	4 – 2
Results

=== Repechages ===
==== Serbia vs Brazil ====
Weight Class	Serbia (SRB)	Result	Brazil (BRA)	Score
Women –70 kg	Marica Perišić	00 – 11	Ketleyn Quadros	0 – 1
Men –90 kg	Nemanja Majdov	00 – 10 (yellow card)	Rafael Macedo	0 – 2
Women +70 kg	Milica Žabić	10 – 00	Beatriz Souza	1 – 2
Men +90 kg	Aleksandar Kukolj	00 – 10	Rafael Silva	1 – 3
Women –57 kg	Milica Nikolić	00 – 11	Rafaela Silva	1 – 4
Men –73 kg	Strahinja Bunčić	—	Willian Lima	—
Results

==== South Korea vs Uzbekistan ====
Weight Class	South Korea (KOR)	Result	Uzbekistan (UZB)	Score
Women –70 kg	Kim Ji-su	00 (yellow card) – 10	Gulnoza Matniyazova	0 – 1
Men –90 kg	Lee Joon-hwan	10 – 00 H	Davlat Bobonov	1 – 1
Women +70 kg	Kim Ha-yun	10 – 01 (yellow card)	Iriskhon Kurbanbaeva	2 – 1
Men +90 kg	Kim Min-jong	11 (yellow card) – 00	Alisher Yusupov	3 – 1
Women –57 kg	Huh Mi-mi	00 – 10	Diyora Keldiyorova	3 – 2
Men –73 kg	An Ba-ul	10 – 00	Murodjon Yuldoshev	4 – 2
Results

=== Semifinals ===
==== Japan vs Germany ====
Weight Class	Japan (JPN)	Result	Germany (GER)	Score
Women –70 kg	Saki Niizoe	01 (yellow card) – 00	Miriam Butkereit	1 – 0
Men -90 kg	Sanshiro Murao	10 (yellow card) – 00	Eduard Trippel	2 – 0
Women +70 kg	Rika Takayama	10 – 00 (yellow card)	Renée Lucht	3 – 0
Men +90 kg	Aaron Wolf	11 – 00	Erik Abramov	4 – 0
Women –57 kg	Haruka Funakubo	—	Pauline Starke	—
Men –73 kg	Soichi Hashimoto	—	Igor Wandtke	—
Results

==== France vs Italy ====
Weight Class	France (FRA)	Result	Italy (ITA)	Score
Women –70 kg	Marie-Ève Gahié	10 – 00	Kim Polling	1 – 0
Men -90 kg	Maxime-Gaël Ngayap Hambou	00 – 10	Christian Parlati	1 – 1
Women +70 kg	Romane Dicko	10 – 00	Alice Bellandi	2 – 1
Men +90 kg	Teddy Riner	10 – 00	Gennaro Pirelli	3 – 1
Women –57 kg	Sarah-Léonie Cysique	01 (yellow card) – 00	Odette Giuffrida	4 – 1
Men –73 kg	Joan-Benjamin Gaba	—	Manuel Lombardo	—
Results

=== Bronze medal matches ===
==== Brazil vs Italy ====
Weight Class	Brazil (BRA)	Result	Italy (ITA)	Score
Men -90 kg	Rafael Macedo	10 – 00 (yellow card)	Christian Parlati	1 – 0
Women +70 kg	Beatriz Souza	10 – 00	Asya Tavano	2 – 0
Men +90 kg	Leonardo Gonçalves	00 – 01	Gennaro Pirelli	2 – 1
Women -57 kg	Rafaela Silva	11 – 00 (yellow card)	Veronica Toniolo	3 – 1
Men -73 kg	Willian Lima	00 (yellow card) – 10	Manuel Lombardo	3 – 2
Women -70 kg	Ketleyn Quadros	01 (yellow card) – 10	Savita Russo	3 – 3
Women -57 kg	Rafaela Silva	01 – 00	Veronica Toniolo	4 – 3
Results

==== South Korea vs Germany ====
Weight Class	South Korea (KOR)	Result	Germany (GER)	Score
Men –90 kg	Lee Joon-hwan	00 – 10	Eduard Trippel	0 – 1
Women + 70 kg	Kim Ha-yun	10 – 00	Renée Lucht	1 – 1
Men +90 kg	Kim Min-jong	10 (yellow card) – 00	Erik Abramov	2 – 1
Women -57 kg	Huh Mi-mi	10 (yellow card) – 00	Pauline Starke	3 – 1
Men -73 kg	An Ba-ul	00 – 01 (yellow card)	Igor Wandtke	3 – 2
Women –70 kg	Kim Ji-su	00 – 10	Miriam Butkereit	3 – 3
Men -73 kg	An Ba-ul	10 (yellow card) – 00	Igor Wandtke	4 – 3
Results

=== Gold medal match - Japan vs France ===
Weight Class	Japan (JPN)	Result	France (FRA)	Score
Men –90 kg	Sanshiro Murao	10 – 00	Maxime-Gaël Ngayap Hambou	1 – 0
Women +70 kg	Rika Takayama	01 – 00	Romane Dicko	2 – 0
Men +90 kg	Tatsuru Saito	00 – 10 (yellow card)	Teddy Riner	2 – 1
Women -57 kg	Natsumi Tsunoda	10 (yellow card) – 00 (yellow card)	Sarah-Léonie Cysique	3 – 1
Men -73 kg	Hifumi Abe	00 (yellow card) – 10	Joan-Benjamin Gaba	3 – 2
Women –70 kg	Miku Takaichi	00 – 01	Clarisse Agbegnenou	3 – 3
Men +90 kg	Tatsuru Saito	00 – 10	Teddy Riner	3 – 4
Results
