= 2024 World Judo Championships – Women's 63 kg =

Judo competition

Judo Women's 63 kg at the 2024 World Judo Championships
- Venue: Mubadala Arena
- Location: Abu Dhabi, United Arab Emirates
- Date: 21 May 2024
- Competitors: 49 from 37 nations
- Total prize money: €57,000

Medalists
gold medal	Joanne van Lieshout (1st title)	Netherlands
silver medal	Angelika Szymańska	Poland
bronze medal	Clarisse Agbegnenou	France
bronze medal	Laura Fazliu	Kosovo

Competition at external databases
- Links: IJF • JudoInside

The Women's 63 kg event at the 2024 World Judo Championships was held at the Mubadala Arena in Abu Dhabi, United Arab Emirates on 21 May 2024.

== Results ==
=== Finals ===
Semi-finals
(Canada) Catherine Beauchemin-Pinard	00
(Netherlands) Joanne van Lieshout	10 (yellow card)
(Poland) Angelika Szymańska	10
(Slovenia) Andreja Leški	00

Final
(Netherlands) Joanne van Lieshout	01 (yellow card)
(Poland) Angelika Szymańska	00

=== Repechage ===
Repechage
(France) Clarisse Agbegnenou	02 (yellow card)
(Croatia) Iva Oberan	00
(Australia) Katharina Haecker	00
(Kosovo) Laura Fazliu	10

Bronze medal
(France) Clarisse Agbegnenou	10 (yellow card)
(Slovenia) Andreja Leški	00
(Kosovo) Laura Fazliu	01 (yellow card)
(Canada) Catherine Beauchemin-Pinard	00

=== Pool A ===
First round
(Czech Republic) Renata Zachová	01 (yellow card)
(Romania) Florentina Ivănescu	00
(Austria) Magdalena Krssakova	02
(Cape Verde) Carolina Francês	00
(Germany) Dena Pohl	00
(Poland) Natalia Kropska	11
(Italy) Savita Russo	01 (yellow card)
(Belgium) Alessia Corrao	00

Round of 32
(Canada) Catherine Beauchemin-Pinard	02 (yellow card)
(Czech Republic) Renata Zachová	00
(Austria) Magdalena Krssakova	00 (yellow card)
(Portugal) Bárbara Timo	10 (yellow card)
(France) Clarisse Agbegnenou	11 (yellow card)
(Poland) Natalia Kropska	00
(Italy) Savita Russo	00
(Japan) Megumi Horikawa	01 (yellow card)

Round of 16
(Canada) Catherine Beauchemin-Pinard	01 (yellow card)
(Portugal) Bárbara Timo	00 (yellow card)
(France) Clarisse Agbegnenou	02
(Japan) Megumi Horikawa	00

Quarter-finals
(Canada) Catherine Beauchemin-Pinard	01
(France) Clarisse Agbegnenou	00 (yellow card)

=== Pool B ===
First round
(Mongolia) Boldyn Gankhaich	11
(United States) Hannah Martin	00
(Croatia) Iva Oberan	01 (yellow card)
(Brazil) Nauana Silva	00
(United Kingdom) ~~Lucy Renshall~~
(China) Tang Jing	w/o
(Australia) Maeve Coughlan	00 (yellow card)
(Spain) Sarai Padilla	01

Round of 32
(Israel) Gili Sharir	00
(Mongolia) Boldyn Gankhaich	10
(Croatia) Iva Oberan	02
(Algeria) Amina Belkadi	00 (yellow card)
(Netherlands) Joanne van Lieshout	10
(China) Tang Jing	00
(Spain) Sarai Padilla	01
(Central African Republic) Nadia Matchiko Guimendego	00

Round of 16
(Mongolia) Boldyn Gankhaich	00
(Croatia) Iva Oberan	10
(Netherlands) Joanne van Lieshout	11
(Spain) Sarai Padilla	00

Quarter-finals
(Croatia) Iva Oberan	00
(Netherlands) Joanne van Lieshout	11

=== Pool C ===
First round
(South Korea) Kim Ji-su	02 (yellow card)
(Austria) Lubjana Piovesana	00
(Brazil) Ketleyn Quadros	00
(Cuba) Maylín del Toro Carvajal	01
(Venezuela) Anriquelis Barrios	10
(Netherlands) Geke van den Berg	00
(Kyrgyzstan) Adina Kochkonbaeva	00
(Kazakhstan) Esmigul Kuyulova	10 (yellow card)

Round of 32
(Australia) Katharina Haecker	10
(South Korea) Kim Ji-su	00
(Cuba) Maylín del Toro Carvajal	10
(Romania) Amanda Zuaznabar-Torres	00
(Poland) Angelika Szymańska	10
(Venezuela) Anriquelis Barrios	00
(Kazakhstan) Esmigul Kuyulova	02 (yellow card)
(Cape Verde) Sandrine Billiet	00 (yellow card)

Round of 16
(Australia) Katharina Haecker	10
(Cuba) Maylín del Toro Carvajal	00
(Poland) Angelika Szymańska	10
(Kazakhstan) Esmigul Kuyulova	00

Quarter-finals
(Australia) Katharina Haecker	00
(Poland) Angelika Szymańska	11

=== Pool D ===
First round
(Croatia) Katarina Krišto	02
(Israel) Inbal Shemesh	00 (yellow card)
Dali Liluashvili	02 (yellow card)
(India) Himanshi Tokas	00
(Georgia (country)) Eter Askilashvili	02 (yellow card)
(Philippines) Kiyomi Watanabe	00 (yellow card)
(Spain) Cristina Cabaña	10 (yellow card)
(United States) Sara Golden	00 (yellow card)
(Mexico) Prisca Awiti Alcaraz	10
(Italy) Flavia Favorini	00

Round of 32
(Kosovo) Laura Fazliu	01
(Croatia) Katarina Krišto	00 (yellow card)
Dali Liluashvili	10
(Turkmenistan) Zülhumar Daşkinowa	00
(Slovenia) Andreja Leški	02
(Georgia (country)) Eter Askilashvili	00
(Spain) Cristina Cabaña	11
(Mexico) Prisca Awiti Alcaraz	00

Round of 16
(Kosovo) Laura Fazliu	11
Dali Liluashvili	00
(Slovenia) Andreja Leški	10 (yellow card)
(Spain) Cristina Cabaña	00 (yellow card)

Quarter-finals
(Kosovo) Laura Fazliu	00
(Slovenia) Andreja Leški	01 (yellow card)

== Prize money ==
The sums listed bring the total prizes awarded to €57,000 for the individual event.

Medal	Total	Judoka	Coach
Gold	€26,000	€20,800	€5,200
Silver	€15,000	€12,000	€3,000
Bronze	€8,000	€6,400	€1,600
