= 2026 European Judo Championships – Women's 63 kg =

Judo competition

Judo Women's 63 kg at the 2026 European Judo Championships
- Venue: Olympic Palace
- Location: Tbilisi, Georgia
- Date: 17 April 2026
- Competitors: 23 from 19 nations

Medalists
gold medal	Joanne van Lieshout (1st title)	Netherlands
silver medal	Manon Deketer	France
bronze medal	Iva Oberan	Croatia
bronze medal	Angelika Szymańska	Poland

Competition at external databases
- Links: IJF • JudoInside

The women's 63 kg event at the 2026 European Judo Championships was held at the Olympic Palace in Tbilisi, Georgia on 17 April 2026.

== Results ==
=== Finals ===
Semi-finals
(Netherlands) Joanne van Lieshout	100
(Poland) Angelika Szymańska	000
(Croatia) Iva Oberan	000
(France) Manon Deketer	002

Final
(Netherlands) Joanne van Lieshout	101
(France) Manon Deketer	000

=== Repechage ===
Repechage
(Israel) Gili Sharir	000
(Slovenia) Kaja Kajzer	001 (yellow card)
(Italy) Carlotta Avanzato	001 (yellow card)
(Slovenia) Leila Mazouzi	000 (yellow card)

Bronze medal
(Slovenia) Kaja Kajzer	000
(Croatia) Iva Oberan	011
(Italy) Carlotta Avanzato	000
(Poland) Angelika Szymańska	100 (yellow card)

=== Pool A ===
First round
(Russia) Dali Liluashvili	001 (yellow card)
(Hungary) Anna Kriza	000
(Spain) Laura Vázquez	000
(Croatia) Nina Simić	100 (yellow card)

Round of 16
(Netherlands) Joanne van Lieshout	100 (yellow card)
(Russia) Dali Liluashvili	000 (yellow card)
(Israel) Gili Sharir	100
(Croatia) Nina Simić	000

Quarter-finals
(Netherlands) Joanne van Lieshout	100
(Israel) Gili Sharir	000

=== Pool B ===
First round
(Czech Republic) Renata Zachová	000
(Slovenia) Kaja Kajzer	001 (yellow card)
(Belarus) Yana Makretskaya	100
(Germany) Sara-Joy Bauer	000

Round of 16
(Kosovo) Laura Fazliu	000
(Slovenia) Kaja Kajzer	101 (yellow card)
(Poland) Angelika Szymańska	021
(Belarus) Yana Makretskaya	000 (yellow card)

Quarter-finals
(Slovenia) Kaja Kajzer	000 (yellow card)
(Poland) Angelika Szymańska	102

=== Pool C ===
First round
(Georgia (country)) Nino Tsiklauri	000
(Poland) Natalia Kropska	100

Round of 16
(Croatia) Iva Oberan	011
(Serbia) Jelena Nišavić	000 (yellow card)
(Italy) Carlotta Avanzato	001
(Poland) Natalia Kropska	000

Quarter-finals
(Croatia) Iva Oberan	101
(Italy) Carlotta Avanzato	000 (yellow card)

=== Pool D ===
First round
(Bulgaria) Yoana Manova	002
(Finland) Louna-Lumia Seikkula	000
(Slovenia) Leila Mazouzi	001
(Israel) Kerem Primo	000 (yellow card)

Round of 16
(France) Manon Deketer	101 (yellow card)
(Bulgaria) Yoana Manova	000 (yellow card)
(Austria) Lubjana Piovesana	000
(Slovenia) Leila Mazouzi	100

Quarter-finals
(France) Manon Deketer	100 (yellow card)
(Slovenia) Leila Mazouzi	000 (yellow card)
