= 2021 European Judo Championships – Women's 63 kg =

Judo Women's 63 kg at the 2021 European Judo Championships
- Venue: Altice Arena
- Location: Lisbon, Portugal
- Date: 17 April
- Competitors: 21 from 16 nations

Medalists
gold medal	Tina Trstenjak (3rd title)	Slovenia
silver medal	Daria Davydova	Russia
bronze medal	Andreja Leški	Slovenia
bronze medal	Sanne Vermeer	Netherlands

Competition at external databases
- Links: IJF • JudoInside

The women's 63 kg competition at the 2021 European Judo Championships was held on 17 April at the Altice Arena.

== Results ==
=== Final ===
Final
Tina Trstenjak (SLO)	01
Daria Davydova (RUS)	00

=== Repechage ===
Repechage
Agata Ozdoba-Błach (POL)	10
Cristina Cabaña (ESP)	00

Third place
Agata Ozdoba-Błach (POL)	00
Andreja Leški (SLO)	10

Repechage
Maria Centracchio (ITA)	00
Laura Fazliu (KOS)	10

Third place
Laura Fazliu (KOS)	00
Sanne Vermeer (NED)	10

=== Top half ===
Round of 32
Iva Oberan (CRO)	10
Laerke Olsen (DEN)	00
Anastasiia Antipina (UKR)	00
Cristina Cabaña (ESP)	10

Round of 16
Tina Trstenjak (SLO)	10
Brigitta Varga (HUN)	00
Agata Ozdoba-Błach (POL)	01
Iva Oberan (CRO)	00
Sanne Vermeer (NED)	10
Nadja Bazynski (GER)	00
Magdalena Krssakova (AUT)	00
Cristina Cabaña (ESP)	10

Quarterfinals
Tina Trstenjak (SLO)	10
Agata Ozdoba-Błach (POL)	00
Sanne Vermeer (NED)	10
Cristina Cabaña (ESP)	00

Semifinals
Tina Trstenjak (SLO)	10
Sanne Vermeer (NED)	00

=== Bottom half ===
Round of 32
Anja Obradović (SRB)	10
Stefania Adelina Dobre (ROU)	00
Angelika Szymańska (POL)	00
Isabel Puche (ESP)	01
Laura Fazliu (KOS)	10
Dena Pohl (GER)	00

Round of 16
Andreja Leški (SLO)	01
Anja Obradović (SRB)	00
Maria Centracchio (ITA)	11
Isabel Puche (ESP)	00
Juul Franssen (NED)	00
Laura Fazliu (KOS)	01
Daria Davydova (RUS)	10
Emilia Kanerva (FIN)	00

Quarterfinals
Andreja Leški (SLO)	10
Maria Centracchio (ITA)	00
Laura Fazliu (KOS)	00
Daria Davydova (RUS)	01

Semifinals
Andreja Leški (SLO)	00
Daria Davydova (RUS)	01
