= Nigara Shaheen =

Afghani judoka (born 1993)

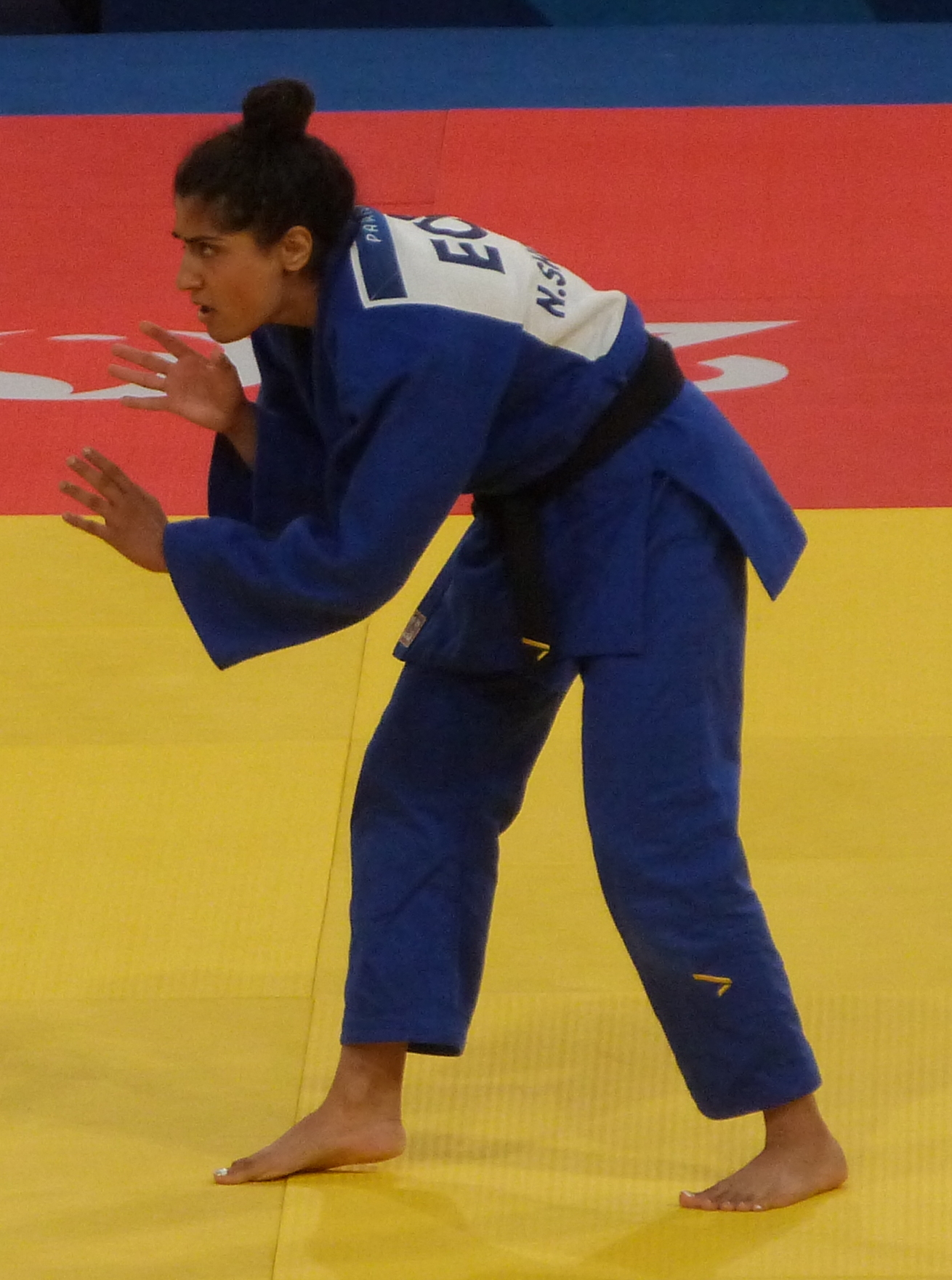
- Shaheen in 2024

Personal information
- Born: 7 June 1993 (age 32); Jalalabad, Afghanistan
- Occupation: Judoka

Sport
- Country: IJF Refugee Team
- Sport: Judo
- Weight class: ‍–‍63 kg, ‍–‍70 kg

Achievements and titles
- Olympic Games: R32 (2020, 2024)
- World Champ.: R32 (2023)
- Asian Champ.: R32 (2017)

Profile at external databases
- IJF: 38986, 59877
- JudoInside.com: 114985
- Updated on 30 July 2024

Nigara Shaheen (born 7 June 1993) is an Afghan-born judoka based in Canada. She competed at the 2020 Summer Olympics and the 2024 Summer Olympics, both times as a member of the Refugee Olympic Team.

== Early life and education ==
Nigara Shaheen was born in Afghanistan and has three siblings. When she was six months old, her family moved from Jalalabad to Peshawar in Pakistan, fleeing the Afghan War. At age 18, she moved to Kabul to study political science and public administration at the American University of Afghanistan. She left Afghanistan for a second time in 2018.

Shaheen spent time in Russia studying for her master's degree in international trade from the Ural Federal University. After finishing her degree, she returned to Pakistan, though she rarely left home due to concerns about her safety. She has been living in Canada since September 2022, studying for a postgraduate degree in international development and teaching English to Afghan children online around her training schedule.

== Career ==
Shaheen wanted to participate in martial arts and began with karate at age 11, which was the only option available in her area; she trained on the balcony at her aunt's house. Her coach asked if she wanted to try judo while at a youth tournament in Islamabad, and afterward she switched to judo.

After moving to Afghanistan, Shaheen trained with the Afghanistan national team. She felt welcomed by the other athletes, including the men, but she experienced harassment by others, including cyberbullying and physical harassment in the streets. When she was studying in Russia, she could not find a local training partner and trained alone.

Shaheen competed at the 2017 Asian Championships, 2019 Ekaterinburg Grand Slam, 2020 Düsseldorf Grand Slam, and 2021 Kazan Grand Slam. Since 2020, she has competed as a member of the refugee team.

Shaheen was a member of the Refugee Olympic Team at the 2020 Summer Olympics. Ahead of the Games, a team official tested positive for COVID-19, and she and her other team members were afraid that they would not be able to compete, although they were ultimately able to do so. She competed in the women's 70 kg event at the 2020 Summer Olympics in Tokyo, Japan, where she lost in the first round after she sustained a serious shoulder injury, and in the mixed team event, although she did not actually compete due to prior losses by her teammates. She struggled due to language barriers, as her coach spoke Arabic and she does not, and faced criticism for not wearing a hijab at the Games.

After the Olympics, Shaheen continued to compete internationally, including at the 2022 World Championships, 2023 World Championships, and 2024 European Championships.

Shaheen was again a member of the Refugee Olympic Team at the 2024 Summer Olympics. She competed in the women's 63 kg competition and competed against Prisca Awiti Alcaraz in the first round, which she lost, and in the mixed team event.
