= 2026 Judo Grand Slam Ulaanbaatar =

Judo competition

Judo 2026 Judo Grand Slam Ulaanbaatar
- Venue: AIC Steppe Arena
- Location: Ulaanbaatar, Mongolia
- Dates: 19–21 June 2026
- Competitors: 454 from 58 nations
- Total prize money: €154,000

Competition at external databases
- Links: IJF • JudoInside

The 2026 Judo Grand Slam Ulaanbaatar is a judo competition of the Grand Slam series that was held at the AIC Steppe Arena in Ulaanbaatar, Mongolia from 19 to 21 June 2026 as part of the IJF World Tour and during the 2028 Summer Olympics qualification period.

== Medal summary ==
=== Men's events ===
Event	Gold	Silver	Bronze
Extra-lightweight (−60 kg)	Balabay Aghayev (AZE)	Ryuju Nagayama (JPN)	Izhak Ashpiz (ISR)
Extra-lightweight (−60 kg)	Balabay Aghayev (AZE)	Ryuju Nagayama (JPN)	Byambasürengiin Sükhbat (MGL)
Half-lightweight (−66 kg)	Takeshi Takeoka (JPN)	Ramazan Abdulaev (RUS)	Nizami Imranov (AZE)
Half-lightweight (−66 kg)	Takeshi Takeoka (JPN)	Ramazan Abdulaev (RUS)	Kim Chann-yeong (KOR)
Lightweight (−73 kg)	Lavjargalyn Ankhzayaa (MGL)	Jack Yonezuka (USA)	Odgereliin Uranbayar (MGL)
Lightweight (−73 kg)	Lavjargalyn Ankhzayaa (MGL)	Jack Yonezuka (USA)	Victor Skerlev (BUL)
Half-middleweight (−81 kg)	Lee Joon-hwan (KOR)	Yuhei Oino (JPN)	Timur Arbuzov (RUS)
Half-middleweight (−81 kg)	Lee Joon-hwan (KOR)	Yuhei Oino (JPN)	Mihajlo Simin (SRB)
Middleweight (−90 kg)	Sanshiro Murao (JPN)	Kim Jong-hoon (KOR)	Boris Rutović (SRB)
Middleweight (−90 kg)	Sanshiro Murao (JPN)	Kim Jong-hoon (KOR)	Murad Fatiyev (AZE)
Half-heavyweight (−100 kg)	Gennaro Pirelli (ITA)	Idar Bifov (RUS)	Ilia Sulamanidze (GEO)
Half-heavyweight (−100 kg)	Gennaro Pirelli (ITA)	Idar Bifov (RUS)	Zelym Kotsoiev (AZE)
Heavyweight (+100 kg)	Kim Min-jong (KOR)	Irakli Demetrashvili (GEO)	Jur Spijkers (NED)
Heavyweight (+100 kg)	Kim Min-jong (KOR)	Irakli Demetrashvili (GEO)	Inal Tasoev (RUS)

=== Women's events ===
Event	Gold	Silver	Bronze
Extra-lightweight (−48 kg)	Wakana Koga (JPN)	Zhuang Wenna (CHN)	Tuğçe Beder (TUR)
Extra-lightweight (−48 kg)	Wakana Koga (JPN)	Zhuang Wenna (CHN)	Laura Martínez (ESP)
Half-lightweight (−52 kg)	Uta Abe (JPN)	Odette Giuffrida (ITA)	Bishreltiin Khorloodoi (UAE)
Half-lightweight (−52 kg)	Uta Abe (JPN)	Odette Giuffrida (ITA)	Réka Pupp (HUN)
Lightweight (−57 kg)	Akari Omori (JPN)	Sarah-Léonie Cysique (FRA)	Maysa Pardayeva (TKM)
Lightweight (−57 kg)	Akari Omori (JPN)	Sarah-Léonie Cysique (FRA)	Seija Ballhaus (GER)
Half-middleweight (−63 kg)	Haruka Kaju (JPN)	Joanne van Lieshout (NED)	Lubjana Piovesana (AUT)
Half-middleweight (−63 kg)	Haruka Kaju (JPN)	Joanne van Lieshout (NED)	Dali Liluashvili (RUS)
Middleweight (−70 kg)	Shiho Tanaka (JPN)	Aoife Coughlan (AUS)	Sanne van Dijke (NED)
Middleweight (−70 kg)	Shiho Tanaka (JPN)	Aoife Coughlan (AUS)	Lara Cvjetko (CRO)
Half-heavyweight (−78 kg)	Yelyzaveta Lytvynenko (UAE)	Audrey Tcheuméo (FRA)	Alina Böhm (GER)
Half-heavyweight (−78 kg)	Yelyzaveta Lytvynenko (UAE)	Audrey Tcheuméo (FRA)	Brenda Olaya (COL)
Heavyweight (+78 kg)	Mao Arai (JPN)	Romane Dicko (FRA)	Asya Tavano (ITA)
Heavyweight (+78 kg)	Mao Arai (JPN)	Romane Dicko (FRA)	Célia Cancan (FRA)

=== Medal table ===
* Host nation (Mongolia)

Rank	Nation	Gold	Silver	Bronze	Total
1	Japan (JPN)	8	2	0	10
2	South Korea (KOR)	2	1	1	4
3	Italy (ITA)	1	1	1	3
4	Azerbaijan (AZE)	1	0	3	4
5	Mongolia (MGL)*	1	0	2	3
6	United Arab Emirates (UAE)	1	0	1	2
7	France (FRA)	0	3	1	4
8	Russia (RUS)	0	2	3	5
9	Netherlands (NED)	0	1	2	3
10	Georgia (GEO)	0	1	1	2
11	Australia (AUS)	0	1	0	1
11	China (CHN)	0	1	0	1
11	United States (USA)	0	1	0	1
14	Germany (GER)	0	0	2	2
14	Serbia (SRB)	0	0	2	2
16	Austria (AUT)	0	0	1	1
16	Bulgaria (BUL)	0	0	1	1
16	Colombia (COL)	0	0	1	1
16	Croatia (CRO)	0	0	1	1
16	Hungary (HUN)	0	0	1	1
16	Israel (ISR)	0	0	1	1
16	Spain (ESP)	0	0	1	1
16	Turkey (TUR)	0	0	1	1
16	Turkmenistan (TKM)	0	0	1	1
Totals (24 entries)		14	14	28	56

== Prize money ==
The sums written are per medalist, bringing the total prizes awarded to €154,000. (retrieved from:)

Medal	Total	Judoka	Coach
Gold	€5,000	€4,000	€1,000
Silver	€3,000	€2,400	€600
Bronze	€1,500	€1,200	€300
