= Andreja Leški =

Slovenian judoka (born 1997)

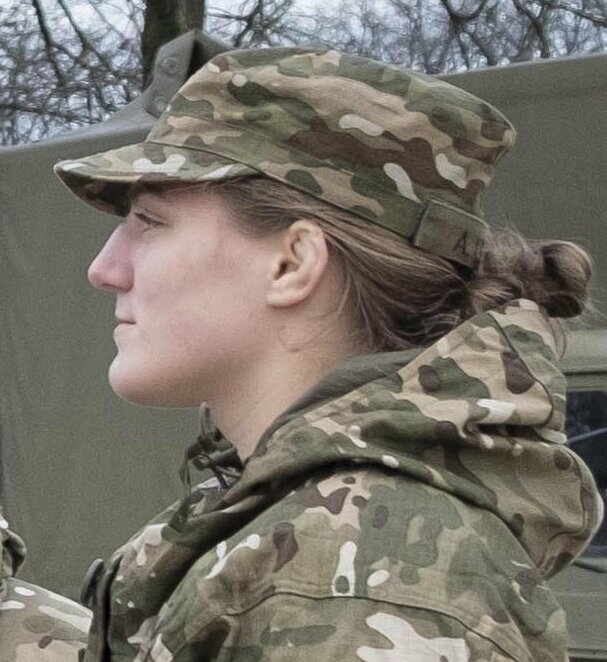
- Leški in 2021

Personal information
- Born: 8 January 1997 (age 29) Koper, Slovenia
- Occupation: Judoka
- Height: 1.65 m (5 ft 5 in)

Sport
- Country: Slovenia
- Sport: Judo
- Weight class: ‍–‍63 kg
- Retired: 14 February 2026

Achievements and titles
- Olympic Games: (gold) (2024)
- World Champ.: (silver) (2021, 2023)
- European Champ.: (gold) (2023)
- Highest world ranking: 1^{st}
Medal record
Women's judo
Representing Slovenia
Olympic Games
Gold medal – first place	2024 Paris	‍–‍63 kg
World Championships
Silver medal – second place	2021 Budapest	‍–‍63 kg
Silver medal – second place	2023 Doha	‍–‍63 kg
European Championships
Gold medal – first place	2023 Montpellier	‍–‍63 kg
Bronze medal – third place	2021 Lisbon	‍–‍63 kg
Bronze medal – third place	2024 Zagreb	‍–‍63 kg
World Masters
Bronze medal – third place	2021 Doha	‍–‍63 kg
IJF Grand Slam
Gold medal – first place	2018 Düsseldorf	‍–‍63 kg
Silver medal – second place	2017 Baku	‍–‍63 kg
Silver medal – second place	2018 Abu Dhabi	‍–‍63 kg
Silver medal – second place	2021 Tel Aviv	‍–‍63 kg
Silver medal – second place	2021 Tashkent	‍–‍63 kg
Silver medal – second place	2024 Astana	‍–‍63 kg
Bronze medal – third place	2019 Paris	‍–‍63 kg
Bronze medal – third place	2019 Düsseldorf	‍–‍63 kg
Bronze medal – third place	2021 Abu Dhabi	‍–‍63 kg
Bronze medal – third place	2022 Baku	‍–‍63 kg
Bronze medal – third place	2023 Ulaanbaatar	‍–‍63 kg
Bronze medal – third place	2024 Tashkent	‍–‍63 kg
IJF Grand Prix
Gold medal – first place	2018 Agadir	‍–‍63 kg
Gold medal – first place	2019 Marrakesh	‍–‍63 kg
Gold medal – first place	2021 Zagreb	‍–‍63 kg
Bronze medal – third place	2016 Ulaanbaatar	‍–‍57 kg
Bronze medal – third place	2016 Tashkent	‍–‍63 kg
Bronze medal – third place	2017 Tbilisi	‍–‍63 kg
Bronze medal – third place	2018 Budapest	‍–‍63 kg
Bronze medal – third place	2018 Tashkent	‍–‍63 kg
World Juniors Championships
Bronze medal – third place	2015 Abu Dhabi	‍–‍57 kg
European Junior Championships
Silver medal – second place	2016 Málaga	‍–‍57 kg
Bronze medal – third place	2014 Bucharest	‍–‍52 kg
European Cadet Championships
Gold medal – first place	2014 Athens	‍–‍52 kg
Silver medal – second place	2013 Tallinn	‍–‍48 kg

Profile at external databases
- IJF: 13463
- JudoInside.com: 73731
- Updated on 31 July 2024

Andreja Leški (born 8 January 1997) is a Slovenian retired judoka, who won gold in the women's 63 kg at the 2024 Summer Olympics in Paris, France. She won silver medals in the women's 63 kg event at the 2021 World Championships held in Budapest, Hungary and at the 2023 World Championships in Doha, Qatar. She also competed at the World Championships in 2017, 2018, 2022 & 2024.

== Career ==
Leški was eliminated in her first match in the women's 63 kg event at the 2017 European Championships held in Warsaw, Poland.

Leški won one of the bronze medals in her event at the 2021 World Masters held in Doha, Qatar. A few months later, she won one of the bronze medals in the women's 63 kg event at the 2021 European Championships held in Lisbon, Portugal. In June, she won silver medal in the women's 63 kg event at the 2021 World Championships in Budapest, Hungary. In the final, she lost against Clarisse Agbegnenou of France. At the 2021 Abu Dhabi Grand Slam held in Abu Dhabi, United Arab Emirates, she won one of the bronze medals in her event.

In 2023, Leški won silver medal in the women's 63 kg event at the 2023 World Championships in Doha, her second one from World Championships. She was again defeated in the final by Clarisse Agbegnenou.
