= 2024 Judo Grand Slam Antalya =

Judo competition

Judo 2024 Judo Grand Slam Antalya
- Venue: Antalya Sports Hall
- Location: Antalya, Turkey
- Dates: 29–31 March 2024
- Competitors: 628 from 93 nations
- Total prize money: €154,000

Competition at external databases
- Links: IJF • EJU • JudoInside

The 2024 Judo Grand Slam Antalya was a Judo Grand Slam tournament held at the Antalya Sports Hall in Antalya, Turkey, from 29 to 31 March 2024 as part of the IJF World Tour and during the 2024 Summer Olympics qualification period.

== Medal summary ==
=== Men's events ===
Event	Gold	Silver	Bronze
Extra-lightweight (−60 kg)	Ayub Bliev (AIN)	Luka Mkheidze (FRA)	Salih Yıldız (TUR)
Extra-lightweight (−60 kg)	Ayub Bliev (AIN)	Luka Mkheidze (FRA)	Emiel Jaring (NED)
Half-lightweight (−66 kg)	Hifumi Abe (JPN)	Nurali Emomali (TJK)	Walide Khyar (FRA)
Half-lightweight (−66 kg)	Hifumi Abe (JPN)	Nurali Emomali (TJK)	Obid Dzhebov (TJK)
Lightweight (−73 kg)	Adil Osmanov (MDA)	Rashid Mammadaliyev (AZE)	Umalt Demirel (TUR)
Lightweight (−73 kg)	Adil Osmanov (MDA)	Rashid Mammadaliyev (AZE)	Shakhram Ahadov (UZB)
Half-middleweight (−81 kg)	Takanori Nagase (JPN)	François Gauthier-Drapeau (CAN)	João Fernando (POR)
Half-middleweight (−81 kg)	Takanori Nagase (JPN)	François Gauthier-Drapeau (CAN)	Guilherme Schimidt (BRA)
Middleweight (−90 kg)	Sanshiro Murao (JPN)	Vugar Talibov (AZE)	Mihael Žgank (TUR)
Middleweight (−90 kg)	Sanshiro Murao (JPN)	Vugar Talibov (AZE)	Iván Felipe Silva Morales (CUB)
Half-heavyweight (−100 kg)	Jorge Fonseca (POR)	Shady El Nahas (CAN)	Batkhuyagiin Gonchigsüren (MGL)
Half-heavyweight (−100 kg)	Jorge Fonseca (POR)	Shady El Nahas (CAN)	Aaron Wolf (JPN)
Heavyweight (+100 kg)	Teddy Riner (FRA)	Tatsuru Saito (JPN)	Erik Abramov (GER)
Heavyweight (+100 kg)	Teddy Riner (FRA)	Tatsuru Saito (JPN)	Valeriy Endovitskiy (AIN)

Source results:

=== Women's events ===
Event	Gold	Silver	Bronze
Extra-lightweight (−48 kg)	Natsumi Tsunoda (JPN)	Sıla Ersin (TUR)	Abiba Abuzhakynova (KAZ)
Extra-lightweight (−48 kg)	Natsumi Tsunoda (JPN)	Sıla Ersin (TUR)	Ganbaataryn Narantsetseg (MGL)
Half-lightweight (−52 kg)	Uta Abe (JPN)	Chelsie Giles (GBR)	Ayumi Leiva Sánchez (ESP)
Half-lightweight (−52 kg)	Uta Abe (JPN)	Chelsie Giles (GBR)	Ana Viktorija Puljiz (CRO)
Lightweight (−57 kg)	Christa Deguchi (CAN)	Jéssica Lima (BRA)	Faïza Mokdar (FRA)
Lightweight (−57 kg)	Christa Deguchi (CAN)	Jéssica Lima (BRA)	Maýsa Pardaýewa (TKM)
Half-middleweight (−63 kg)	Kim Ji-su (KOR)	Dali Liluashvili (AIN)	Katarina Krišto (CRO)
Half-middleweight (−63 kg)	Kim Ji-su (KOR)	Dali Liluashvili (AIN)	Miku Takaichi (JPN)
Middleweight (−70 kg)	Michaela Polleres (AUT)	Tais Pina (POR)	Madina Taimazova (AIN)
Middleweight (−70 kg)	Michaela Polleres (AUT)	Tais Pina (POR)	Ai Tsunoda (ESP)
Half-heavyweight (−78 kg)	Madeleine Malonga (FRA)	Alina Böhm (GER)	Anna-Maria Wagner (GER)
Half-heavyweight (−78 kg)	Madeleine Malonga (FRA)	Alina Böhm (GER)	Ma Zhenzhao (CHN)
Heavyweight (+78 kg)	Julia Tolofua (FRA)	Su Xin (CHN)	Kayra Ozdemir (TUR)
Heavyweight (+78 kg)	Julia Tolofua (FRA)	Su Xin (CHN)	Hilal Öztürk (TUR)

Source results:

=== Medal table ===
* Host nation (Turkey)

Rank	Nation	Gold	Silver	Bronze	Total
1	Japan (JPN)	5	1	2	8
2	France (FRA)	3	1	2	6
3	Canada (CAN)	1	2	0	3
4	Portugal (POR)	1	1	1	3
–	Individual Neutral Athletes (AIN)	1	0	2	3
5	Austria (AUT)	1	0	0	1
5	Moldova (MDA)	1	0	0	1
5	South Korea (KOR)	1	0	0	1
8	Azerbaijan (AZE)	0	2	0	2
9	Turkey (TUR)*	0	1	5	6
10	Germany (GER)	0	1	2	3
11	Brazil (BRA)	0	1	1	2
11	China (CHN)	0	1	1	2
11	Tajikistan (TJK)	0	1	1	2
14	Great Britain (GBR)	0	1	0	1
14	Russia (RUS)	0	1	0	1
16	Croatia (CRO)	0	0	2	2
16	Mongolia (MGL)	0	0	2	2
16	Spain (ESP)	0	0	2	2
19	Cuba (CUB)	0	0	1	1
19	Kazakhstan (KAZ)	0	0	1	1
19	Netherlands (NED)	0	0	1	1
19	Turkmenistan (TKM)	0	0	1	1
19	Uzbekistan (UZB)	0	0	1	1
Totals (23 entries)		14	14	28	56

== Prize money ==
The sums written are per medalist, bringing the total prizes awarded to €154,000. (retrieved from:)

Medal	Total	Judoka	Coach
Gold	€5,000	€4,000	€1,000
Silver	€3,000	€2,400	€600
Bronze	€1,500	€1,200	€300
