= 2024 Judo Grand Slam Tbilisi =

Judo competition

Judo 2024 Judo Grand Slam Tbilisi
- Venue: Olympic Palace
- Location: Tbilisi, Georgia
- Dates: 22–24 March 2024
- Competitors: 531 from 83 nations
- Total prize money: €154,000

Competition at external databases
- Links: IJF • EJU • JudoInside

The 2024 Judo Grand Slam Tbilisi is a Judo Grand Slam tournament that was held at the Olympic Palace in Tbilisi, Georgia, from 22 to 24 March 2024 as part of the IJF World Tour and during the 2024 Summer Olympics qualification period.

== Medal summary ==
=== Men's events ===
Event	Gold	Silver	Bronze
Extra-lightweight (−60 kg)	Nurkanat Serikbayev (KAZ)	Yam Wolczak (ISR)	Balabay Aghayev (AZE)
Extra-lightweight (−60 kg)	Nurkanat Serikbayev (KAZ)	Yam Wolczak (ISR)	Tornike Tsjakadoea (NED)
Half-lightweight (−66 kg)	Ivan Chernykh (AIN)	Sardor Nurillaev (UZB)	Willian Lima (BRA)
Half-lightweight (−66 kg)	Ivan Chernykh (AIN)	Sardor Nurillaev (UZB)	Ruslan Pashayev (AZE)
Lightweight (−73 kg)	Lasha Shavdatuashvili (GEO)	Karen Galstian (AIN)	Soichi Hashimoto (JPN)
Lightweight (−73 kg)	Lasha Shavdatuashvili (GEO)	Karen Galstian (AIN)	Tohar Butbul (ISR)
Half-middleweight (−81 kg)	Timur Arbuzov (AIN)	Sharofiddin Boltaboev (UZB)	Sagi Muki (ISR)
Half-middleweight (−81 kg)	Timur Arbuzov (AIN)	Sharofiddin Boltaboev (UZB)	Nugzar Tatalashvili (UAE)
Middleweight (−90 kg)	Lasha Bekauri (GEO)	Eljan Hajiyev (AZE)	Han Ju-yeop (KOR)
Middleweight (−90 kg)	Lasha Bekauri (GEO)	Eljan Hajiyev (AZE)	Theodoros Tselidis (GRE)
Half-heavyweight (−100 kg)	Nikoloz Sherazadishvili (ESP)	Shady El Nahas (CAN)	Laurin Boehler (AUT)
Half-heavyweight (−100 kg)	Nikoloz Sherazadishvili (ESP)	Shady El Nahas (CAN)	Zsombor Vég (HUN)
Heavyweight (+100 kg)	Guram Tushishvili (GEO)	Ushangi Kokauri (AZE)	Saba Inaneishvili (GEO)
Heavyweight (+100 kg)	Guram Tushishvili (GEO)	Ushangi Kokauri (AZE)	Andy Granda (CUB)

Source results:

=== Women's events ===
Event	Gold	Silver	Bronze
Extra-lightweight (−48 kg)	Lee Hye-kyeong (KOR)	Laura Espadinha (FRA)	Guo Zongying (CHN)
Extra-lightweight (−48 kg)	Lee Hye-kyeong (KOR)	Laura Espadinha (FRA)	Galiya Tynbayeva (KAZ)
Half-lightweight (−52 kg)	Ariane Toro (ESP)	Ana Viktorija Puljiz (CRO)	Distria Krasniqi (KOS)
Half-lightweight (−52 kg)	Ariane Toro (ESP)	Ana Viktorija Puljiz (CRO)	Mascha Ballhaus (GER)
Lightweight (−57 kg)	Eteri Liparteliani (GEO)	Jessica Klimkait (CAN)	Rafaela Silva (BRA)
Lightweight (−57 kg)	Eteri Liparteliani (GEO)	Jessica Klimkait (CAN)	Christa Deguchi (CAN)
Half-middleweight (−63 kg)	Catherine Beauchemin-Pinard (CAN)	Angelika Szymańska (POL)	Kim Ji-su (KOR)
Half-middleweight (−63 kg)	Catherine Beauchemin-Pinard (CAN)	Angelika Szymańska (POL)	Joanne van Lieshout (NED)
Middleweight (−70 kg)	Barbara Matić (CRO)	Sanne van Dijke (NED)	Miriam Butkereit (GER)
Middleweight (−70 kg)	Barbara Matić (CRO)	Sanne van Dijke (NED)	Elisavet Teltsidou (GRE)
Half-heavyweight (−78 kg)	Yuliia Kurchenko (UKR)	Guusje Steenhuis (NED)	Yelyzaveta Lytvynenko (UKR)
Half-heavyweight (−78 kg)	Yuliia Kurchenko (UKR)	Guusje Steenhuis (NED)	Alina Böhm (GER)
Heavyweight (+78 kg)	Renée Lucht (GER)	Coralie Hayme (FRA)	Lee Hyeon-ji (KOR)
Heavyweight (+78 kg)	Renée Lucht (GER)	Coralie Hayme (FRA)	Asya Tavano (ITA)

Source results:

=== Medal table ===
* Host nation (Georgia)

Rank	Nation	Gold	Silver	Bronze	Total
1	Georgia (GEO)*	4	0	1	5
–	Individual Neutral Athletes (AIN)	2	1	0	3
2	Spain (ESP)	2	0	0	2
3	Canada (CAN)	1	2	1	4
4	Croatia (CRO)	1	1	0	2
5	Germany (GER)	1	0	3	4
5	South Korea (KOR)	1	0	3	4
7	Kazakhstan (KAZ)	1	0	1	2
7	Ukraine (UKR)	1	0	1	2
9	Azerbaijan (AZE)	0	2	2	4
9	Netherlands (NED)	0	2	2	4
11	France (FRA)	0	2	0	2
11	Uzbekistan (UZB)	0	2	0	2
13	Israel (ISR)	0	1	2	3
14	Poland (POL)	0	1	0	1
15	Brazil (BRA)	0	0	2	2
15	Greece (GRE)	0	0	2	2
17	Austria (AUT)	0	0	1	1
17	China (CHN)	0	0	1	1
17	Cuba (CUB)	0	0	1	1
17	Hungary (HUN)	0	0	1	1
17	Italy (ITA)	0	0	1	1
17	Japan (JPN)	0	0	1	1
17	Kosovo (KOS)	0	0	1	1
17	United Arab Emirates (UAE)	0	0	1	1
Totals (24 entries)		14	14	28	56

== Prize money ==
The sums written are per medalist, bringing the total prizes awarded to €154,000. (retrieved from:)

Medal	Total	Judoka	Coach
Gold	€5,000	€4,000	€1,000
Silver	€3,000	€2,400	€600
Bronze	€1,500	€1,200	€300
