= 2022 Judo World Masters =

Judo competition

Judo 2022 Judo World Masters
- Venue: Pais Arena
- Location: Jerusalem, Israel
- Dates: 20–22 December 2022
- Competitors: 367 from 58 nations
- Total prize money: €196,000

Competition at external databases
- Links: IJF • EJU • JudoInside

The 2022 Judo World Masters was held at the Pais Arena in Jerusalem, Israel, from 20 to 22 December 2022 as part of the IJF World Tour and during the 2024 Summer Olympics qualification period.

== Schedule ==
The draw was held on 19 December at 14:00. All times are local (UTC+2).

| | Date | Weight classes | | Preliminaries | Final Block |
| | Date | Men | Women | Preliminaries | Final Block |
|---|---|---|---|---|---|
| Day 1 | 20 December | –60, –66 | –48, –52, –57 | 10:00 | 17:00 |
| Day 2 | 21 December | –73, –81 | –63, –70 | 11:00 | 17:00 |
| Day 3 | 22 December | –90, –100, +100 | –78, +78 | 10:30 | 17:00 |

== Medal summary ==
=== Men's events ===
| Event | Gold | Silver | Bronze |
|---|---|---|---|
| Extra-lightweight (−60 kg) | Lee Ha-rim (KOR) | Ryuju Nagayama (JPN) | Balabay Aghayev (AZE) |
| Extra-lightweight (−60 kg) | Lee Ha-rim (KOR) | Ryuju Nagayama (JPN) | Yang Yung-wei (TPE) |
| Half-lightweight (−66 kg) | Baruch Shmailov (ISR) | Daikii Bouba (FRA) | Walide Khyar (FRA) |
| Half-lightweight (−66 kg) | Baruch Shmailov (ISR) | Daikii Bouba (FRA) | Denis Vieru (MDA) |
| Lightweight (−73 kg) | Daniel Cargnin (BRA) | Shakhram Akhadov (UZB) | Murodjon Yuldoshev (UZB) |
| Lightweight (−73 kg) | Daniel Cargnin (BRA) | Shakhram Akhadov (UZB) | Arthur Margelidon (CAN) |
| Half-middleweight (−81 kg) | Tato Grigalashvili (GEO) | Saeid Mollaei (AZE) | Matthias Casse (BEL) |
| Half-middleweight (−81 kg) | Tato Grigalashvili (GEO) | Saeid Mollaei (AZE) | Alpha Oumar Djalo (FRA) |
| Middleweight (−90 kg) | Sanshiro Murao (JPN) | Alexis Mathieu (FRA) | Luka Maisuradze (GEO) |
| Middleweight (−90 kg) | Sanshiro Murao (JPN) | Alexis Mathieu (FRA) | Rafael Macedo (BRA) |
| Half-heavyweight (−100 kg) | Ilia Sulamanidze (GEO) | Simeon Catharina (NED) | Peter Paltchik (ISR) |
| Half-heavyweight (−100 kg) | Ilia Sulamanidze (GEO) | Simeon Catharina (NED) | Zelym Kotsoiev (AZE) |
| Heavyweight (+100 kg) | Tatsuru Saito (JPN) | Temur Rakhimov (TJK) | Kokoro Kageura (JPN) |
| Heavyweight (+100 kg) | Tatsuru Saito (JPN) | Temur Rakhimov (TJK) | Alisher Yusupov (UZB) |

=== Women's events ===
| Event | Gold | Silver | Bronze |
|---|---|---|---|
| Extra-lightweight (−48 kg) | Shirine Boukli (FRA) | Wakana Koga (JPN) | Assunta Scutto (ITA) |
| Extra-lightweight (−48 kg) | Shirine Boukli (FRA) | Wakana Koga (JPN) | Catarina Costa (POR) |
| Half-lightweight (−52 kg) | Distria Krasniqi (KOS) | Chelsie Giles (GBR) | Réka Pupp (HUN) |
| Half-lightweight (−52 kg) | Distria Krasniqi (KOS) | Chelsie Giles (GBR) | Odette Giuffrida (ITA) |
| Lightweight (−57 kg) | Christa Deguchi (CAN) | Sarah-Léonie Cysique (FRA) | Huh Mi-mi (KOR) |
| Lightweight (−57 kg) | Christa Deguchi (CAN) | Sarah-Léonie Cysique (FRA) | Tsukasa Yoshida (JPN) |
| Half-middleweight (−63 kg) | Miku Takaichi (JPN) | Laura Fazliu (KOS) | Gili Sharir (ISR) |
| Half-middleweight (−63 kg) | Miku Takaichi (JPN) | Laura Fazliu (KOS) | Angelika Szymańska (POL) |
| Middleweight (−70 kg) | Michaela Polleres (AUT) | Marie-Ève Gahié (FRA) | Lara Cvjetko (CRO) |
| Middleweight (−70 kg) | Michaela Polleres (AUT) | Marie-Ève Gahié (FRA) | Saki Niizoe (JPN) |
| Half-heavyweight (−78 kg) | Alice Bellandi (ITA) | Audrey Tcheuméo (FRA) | Guusje Steenhuis (NED) |
| Half-heavyweight (−78 kg) | Alice Bellandi (ITA) | Audrey Tcheuméo (FRA) | Mayra Aguiar (BRA) |
| Heavyweight (+78 kg) | Romane Dicko (FRA) | Coralie Hayme (FRA) | Raz Hershko (ISR) |
| Heavyweight (+78 kg) | Romane Dicko (FRA) | Coralie Hayme (FRA) | Akira Sone (JPN) |

=== Medal table ===
* Host nation (Israel)

| Rank | Nation | Gold | Silver | Bronze | Total |
|---|---|---|---|---|---|
| 1 | Japan (JPN) | 3 | 2 | 4 | 9 |
| 2 | France (FRA) | 2 | 6 | 2 | 10 |
| 3 | Georgia (GEO) | 2 | 0 | 1 | 3 |
| 4 | Kosovo (KOS) | 1 | 1 | 0 | 2 |
| 5 | Israel (ISR)* | 1 | 0 | 3 | 4 |
| 6 | Brazil (BRA) | 1 | 0 | 2 | 3 |
| 6 | Italy (ITA) | 1 | 0 | 2 | 3 |
| 8 | Canada (CAN) | 1 | 0 | 1 | 2 |
| 8 | South Korea (KOR) | 1 | 0 | 1 | 2 |
| 10 | Austria (AUT) | 1 | 0 | 0 | 1 |
| 11 | Azerbaijan (AZE) | 0 | 1 | 2 | 3 |
| 11 | Uzbekistan (UZB) | 0 | 1 | 2 | 3 |
| 13 | Netherlands (NED) | 0 | 1 | 1 | 2 |
| 14 | Great Britain (GBR) | 0 | 1 | 0 | 1 |
| 14 | Tajikistan (TJK) | 0 | 1 | 0 | 1 |
| 16 | Belgium (BEL) | 0 | 0 | 1 | 1 |
| 16 | Chinese Taipei (TPE) | 0 | 0 | 1 | 1 |
| 16 | Croatia (CRO) | 0 | 0 | 1 | 1 |
| 16 | Hungary (HUN) | 0 | 0 | 1 | 1 |
| 16 | Moldova (MDA) | 0 | 0 | 1 | 1 |
| 16 | Poland (POL) | 0 | 0 | 1 | 1 |
| 16 | Portugal (POR) | 0 | 0 | 1 | 1 |
| Totals (22 entries) | | 14 | 14 | 28 | 56 |

== Prize money ==
The sums written are per medalist, bringing the total prizes awarded to €196,000. (retrieved from:)

| Medal | Total | Judoka | Coach |
|---|---|---|---|
| Gold | €6,000 | €4,800 | €1,200 |
| Silver | €4,000 | €3,200 | €800 |
| Bronze | €2,000 | €1,600 | €400 |
