= Judo at the 2024 Summer Olympics – Women's 63 kg =

Judo Women's 63 kg at the Games of the XXXIII Olympiad
- Venue: Grand Palais Éphémère
- Location: Paris, France
- Date: 30 July 2024
- Competitors: 29 from 29 nations
- Website: Official website

Medalists
gold medal	Andreja Leški (1st title)	Slovenia
silver medal	Prisca Awiti Alcaraz	Mexico
bronze medal	Clarisse Agbegnenou	France
bronze medal	Laura Fazliu	Kosovo

Competition at external databases
- Links: IJF • JudoInside

The Women's 63 kg event in Judo at the 2024 Summer Olympics was held at the Grand Palais Éphémère in Paris, France on 30 July 2024.

== Summary ==
This is the ninth appearance of the women's half middleweight category.

Clarisse Agbegnenou lost to eventual champion Andreja Leški, later, Agbegnenou won a bronze medal by beating Lubjana Piovesana, Tina Trstenjak did not qualify as she retired in December 2022, one of the bronze medalists, Maria Centracchio did not qualify, and Catherine Beauchemin-Pinard lost to Andreja Leski, later, Beauchemin-Pinard got into repechages losing to potentially bronze medalist Laura Fazliu.

== Results ==
=== Finals ===
Semi-finals
Katarina Krišto (CRO)	00
Prisca Awiti Alcaraz (MEX)	11 (yellow card)
Andreja Leški (SLO)	01
Clarisse Agbegnenou (FRA)	00 (yellow card)

Final
Prisca Awiti Alcaraz (MEX)	01
Andreja Leški (SLO)	10

=== Repechage ===
Repechage
Kim Ji-su (KOR)	00
Lubjana Piovesana (AUT)	10
Catherine Beauchemin-Pinard (CAN)	00
Laura Fazliu (KOS)	01 (yellow card)

Bronze medal
Lubjana Piovesana (AUT)	00
Clarisse Agbegnenou (FRA)	10 (yellow card)
Laura Fazliu (KOS)	10
Katarina Krišto (CRO)	00

=== Pool A ===
First round
Bárbara Timo (POR)	00
Kim Ji-su (KOR)	10 (yellow card)
Miku Takaichi (JPN)	10
Maylín del Toro Carvajal (CUB)	00 (yellow card)
Nadia Guimendego (CAF)	00
Katarina Krišto (CRO)	10

Round of 16
Joanne van Lieshout (NED)	00
Kim Ji-su (KOR)	01
Miku Takaichi (JPN)	00
Katarina Krišto (CRO)	01

Quarter-finals
Kim Ji-su (KOR)	00
Katarina Krišto (CRO)	10 (yellow card)

=== Pool B ===
First round
Angelika Szymańska (POL)	01 (yellow card)
Savita Russo (ITA)	00 (yellow card)
Nigara Shaheen (EOR)	00
Prisca Awiti Alcaraz (MEX)	10
Katharina Haecker (AUS)	01
Lucy Renshall (GBR)	11
Lubjana Piovesana (AUT)	01
Esmigul Kuyulova (KAZ)	00

Round of 16
Angelika Szymańska (POL)	00 (yellow card)
Prisca Awiti Alcaraz (MEX)	01 (yellow card)
Lucy Renshall (GBR)	00 (yellow card)
Lubjana Piovesana (AUT)	01 (yellow card)

Quarter-finals
Prisca Awiti Alcaraz (MEX)	01 (yellow card)
Lubjana Piovesana (AUT)	00

=== Pool C ===
First round
Renata Zachová (CZE)	00
Szofi Özbas (HUN)	01 (yellow card)
Andreja Leški (SLO)	10
Eter Askilashvili (GEO)	00
Anriquelis Barrios (VEN)	00 (yellow card)
Amina Belkadi (ALG)	01

Round of 16
Catherine Beauchemin-Pinard (CAN)	10 (yellow card)
Szofi Özbas (HUN)	00 (yellow card)
Andreja Leški (SLO)	10
Amina Belkadi (ALG)	01 (yellow card)

Quarter-finals
Catherine Beauchemin-Pinard (CAN)	00
Andreja Leški (SLO)	01

=== Pool D ===
First round
Tang Jing (CHN)	10
Kiyomi Watanabe (PHI)	00
Clarisse Agbegnenou (FRA)	01 (yellow card)
Gili Sharir (ISR)	00
Cristina Cabaña (ESP)	00
Ketleyn Quadros (BRA)	10

Round of 16
Laura Fazliu (KOS)	10
Tang Jing (CHN)	00
Clarisse Agbegnenou (FRA)	01
Ketleyn Quadros (BRA)	00

Quarter-finals
Laura Fazliu (KOS)	00
Clarisse Agbegnenou (FRA)	10
