= 2024 Judo Grand Slam Dushanbe =

Judo competition

Judo 2024 Judo Grand Slam Dushanbe
- Venue: Kasri Tennis
- Location: Dushanbe, Tajikistan
- Dates: 3–5 May 2024
- Competitors: 390 from 65 nations
- Total prize money: €154,000

Competition at external databases
- Links: IJF • EJU • JudoInside

The 2024 Judo Grand Slam Dushanbe was held at the Kasri Tennis arena in Dushanbe, Tajikistan, from 3 to 5 May 2024 as part of the IJF World Tour and during the 2024 Summer Olympics qualification period.

== Medal summary ==
=== Men's events ===
Event	Gold	Silver	Bronze
Extra-lightweight (−60 kg)	Muhammadsoleh Quvatov (TJK)	Magzhan Shamshadin (KAZ)	Iznaur Saaev (AIN)
Extra-lightweight (−60 kg)	Muhammadsoleh Quvatov (TJK)	Magzhan Shamshadin (KAZ)	Hayato Kondo (JPN)
Half-lightweight (−66 kg)	Serdar Rahymow (TKM)	Obid Dzhebov (TJK)	Mulorajab Khalifaev (TJK)
Half-lightweight (−66 kg)	Serdar Rahymow (TKM)	Obid Dzhebov (TJK)	Ivan Chernykh (AIN)
Lightweight (−73 kg)	Nils Stump (SUI)	Behruzi Khojazoda (TJK)	Mukhammad Jumaev (UZB)
Lightweight (−73 kg)	Nils Stump (SUI)	Behruzi Khojazoda (TJK)	Darkhan Koibagar (KAZ)
Half-middleweight (−81 kg)	Yoshito Hojo (JPN)	Wachid Borchashvili (AUT)	Abylaikhan Zhubanazar (KAZ)
Half-middleweight (−81 kg)	Yoshito Hojo (JPN)	Wachid Borchashvili (AUT)	Dimitri Gochilaidze (GEO)
Middleweight (−90 kg)	Mansur Lorsanov (AIN)	David Klammert (CZE)	Han Ju-yeop (KOR)
Middleweight (−90 kg)	Mansur Lorsanov (AIN)	David Klammert (CZE)	Muhammadjon Abdujalilzoda (TJK)
Half-heavyweight (−100 kg)	Gennaro Pirelli (ITA)	Daniel Eich (SUI)	Dzhakhongir Madzhidov (TJK)
Half-heavyweight (−100 kg)	Gennaro Pirelli (ITA)	Daniel Eich (SUI)	Dzhafar Kostoev (UAE)
Heavyweight (+100 kg)	Teddy Riner (FRA)	Temur Rakhimov (TJK)	Denis Batchaev (AIN)
Heavyweight (+100 kg)	Teddy Riner (FRA)	Temur Rakhimov (TJK)	Losseni Kone (GER)

Source results:

=== Women's events ===
Event	Gold	Silver	Bronze
Extra-lightweight (−48 kg)	Bavuudorjiin Baasankhüü (MGL)	Tuğçe Beder (TUR)	Milica Nikolić (SRB)
Extra-lightweight (−48 kg)	Bavuudorjiin Baasankhüü (MGL)	Tuğçe Beder (TUR)	Aina Moiseeva (AIN)
Half-lightweight (−52 kg)	Fabienne Kocher (SUI)	Binta Ndiaye (SUI)	Glafira Borisova (AIN)
Half-lightweight (−52 kg)	Fabienne Kocher (SUI)	Binta Ndiaye (SUI)	Jung Ye-rin (KOR)
Lightweight (−57 kg)	Jessica Klimkait (CAN)	Sarah-Léonie Cysique (FRA)	Veronica Toniolo (ITA)
Lightweight (−57 kg)	Jessica Klimkait (CAN)	Sarah-Léonie Cysique (FRA)	Lkhagvatogoogiin Enkhriilen (MGL)
Half-middleweight (−63 kg)	Lubjana Piovesana (AUT)	Dali Liluashvili (AIN)	Iva Oberan (CRO)
Half-middleweight (−63 kg)	Lubjana Piovesana (AUT)	Dali Liluashvili (AIN)	Amina Belkadi (ALG)
Middleweight (−70 kg)	Michaela Polleres (AUT)	Lara Cvjetko (CRO)	Szabina Gercsák (HUN)
Middleweight (−70 kg)	Michaela Polleres (AUT)	Lara Cvjetko (CRO)	Kelly Petersen Pollard (GBR)
Half-heavyweight (−78 kg)	Anna-Maria Wagner (GER)	Alina Böhm (GER)	Emma Reid (GBR)
Half-heavyweight (−78 kg)	Anna-Maria Wagner (GER)	Alina Böhm (GER)	Beata Pacut (POL)
Heavyweight (+78 kg)	Asya Tavano (ITA)	Kinga Wolszczak (POL)	Urszula Hofman (POL)
Heavyweight (+78 kg)	Asya Tavano (ITA)	Kinga Wolszczak (POL)	Lee Hyeon-ji (KOR)

Source results:

=== Medal table ===
* Host nation (Tajikistan)

Rank	Nation	Gold	Silver	Bronze	Total
1	Switzerland (SUI)	2	2	0	4
2	Austria (AUT)	2	1	0	3
3	Italy (ITA)	2	0	1	3
4	Tajikistan (TJK)*	1	3	3	7
–	Individual Neutral Athletes (AIN)	1	1	5	7
5	Germany (GER)	1	1	1	3
6	France (FRA)	1	1	0	2
7	Japan (JPN)	1	0	1	2
7	Mongolia (MGL)	1	0	1	2
9	Canada (CAN)	1	0	0	1
9	Turkmenistan (TKM)	1	0	0	1
11	Kazakhstan (KAZ)	0	1	2	3
11	Poland (POL)	0	1	2	3
13	Croatia (CRO)	0	1	1	2
14	Czech Republic (CZE)	0	1	0	1
14	Turkey (TUR)	0	1	0	1
16	South Korea (KOR)	0	0	3	3
17	Great Britain (GBR)	0	0	2	2
18	Algeria (ALG)	0	0	1	1
18	Georgia (GEO)	0	0	1	1
18	Hungary (HUN)	0	0	1	1
18	Serbia (SRB)	0	0	1	1
18	United Arab Emirates (UAE)	0	0	1	1
18	Uzbekistan (UZB)	0	0	1	1
Totals (23 entries)		14	14	28	56

== Prize money ==
The sums written are per medalist, bringing the total prizes awarded to €154,000. (retrieved from:)

Medal	Total	Judoka	Coach
Gold	€5,000	€4,000	€1,000
Silver	€3,000	€2,400	€600
Bronze	€1,500	€1,200	€300
