= Judo at the 2023 Pan American Games – Women's 63 kg =

Judo Women's 63 kg at the 2023 Pan American Games
- Venue: Contact Sports Center
- Location: Santiago, Chile
- Date: 29 October
- Competitors: 10 from 10 nations
- Website: Official website

Medalists
| gold medal | Maylín del Toro (2nd title); Cuba |
| silver medal | Isabelle Harris; Canada |
| bronze medal | Prisca Awiti Alcaraz; Mexico |
| bronze medal | Ketleyn Quadros; Brazil |

Competition at external databases
- Links: IJF

The women's 63 kg competition of the judo events at the 2023 Pan American Games was held on 29 October at the Contact Sports Center (Centro de Entrenamiento de los Deportes de Contacto) in Santiago, Chile. A total of 10 athletes from 10 NOC's competed.

== Schedule ==
All times are local (UTC−3)

| Date | Time | Event |
|---|---|---|
| Sunday, 29 October 2023 | 10:00 | Elimination round of 16 |
| Sunday, 29 October 2023 | 10:00 | Quarterfinals |
| Sunday, 29 October 2023 | 11:00 | Repechage |
| Sunday, 29 October 2023 | 11:00 | Semifinals |
| Sunday, 29 October 2023 | 15:00 | Finals |

== Results ==
=== Main Bracket ===
Round of 16
Sara Golden (USA) | 10
Ariela Sánchez (DOM) | 01
Cindy Mera (COL) | 10
Edith Ortiz (ECU) | 00

Quarter-finals
Ketleyn Quadros (BRA) | 10
Sara Golden (USA) | 00
Prisca Awiti Alcaraz (MEX) | 00 (yellow card)
Isabelle Harris (CAN) | 11
Maylín del Toro (CUB) | 01
Cindy Mera (COL) | 00 (yellow card)
Agustina De Lucía (ARG) | 10 (yellow card)
Constanza Pérez (CHI) | 00

Semi-finals
Ketleyn Quadros (BRA) | 00 (yellow card)
Isabelle Harris (CAN) | 10 (yellow card)
Maylín del Toro (CUB) | 10
Agustina De Lucía (ARG) | 00

Gold medal contest
Isabelle Harris (CAN) | 00
Maylín del Toro (CUB) | 10

=== Repechage ===
Repechage
Sara Golden (USA) | 00 (yellow card)
Prisca Awiti Alcaraz (MEX) | 01
Cindy Mera (COL) | 01 (yellow card)
Constanza Pérez (CHI) | 00

Bronze medal contests
Prisca Awiti Alcaraz (MEX) | 10 (yellow card)
Agustina De Lucía (ARG) | 00
Cindy Mera (COL) | 00
Ketleyn Quadros (BRA) | 01 (yellow card)
