= Judo at the 2022 Mediterranean Games – Women's 63 kg =

Judo competitions

Judo Women's 63 kg at the 2022 Mediterranean Games
- Venue: Mohammed Ben Ahmed Convention Centre – Hall 03 and 06
- Location: Oran, Algeria
- Date: 30 June
- Competitors: 10 from 10 nations

Medalists
gold medal	Laura Fazliu	Kosovo
silver medal	Cristina Cabaña	Spain
bronze medal	Amina Belkadi	Algeria
bronze medal	Iva Oberan	Croatia

The women's 63 kg competition in judo at the 2022 Mediterranean Games was held on 30 June at the Mohammed Ben Ahmed Convention Centre in Oran.

== Results ==
=== Main bracket ===
Round of 16
Ayten Yeksan (TUR)	00
Nicolle D'Isanto (ITA)	10
Mélodie Turpin (FRA)	11
Wilsa Gomes (POR)	00

Quarterfinals
Cristina Cabaña (ESP)	10
Nicolle D'Isanto (ITA)	00
Sarah Harachi (MAR)	11
Meriem Bjaoui (TUN)	01
Amina Belkadi (ALG)	01
Mélodie Turpin (FRA)	00
Laura Fazliu (KOS)	01
Iva Oberan (CRO)	00

Semifinals
Cristina Cabaña (ESP)	01
Sarah Harachi (MAR)	00
Amina Belkadi (ALG)	00
Laura Fazliu (KOS)	01

Final
Cristina Cabaña (ESP)	00
Laura Fazliu (KOS)	01

=== Repechage ===
Repechage
Nicolle D'Isanto (ITA)	10
Meriem Bjaoui (TUN)	00
Mélodie Turpin (FRA)	00
Iva Oberan (CRO)	10

Bronze medal
Nicolle D'Isanto (ITA)	00
Amina Belkadi (ALG)	10
Iva Oberan (CRO)	10
Sarah Harachi (MAR)	00
