= Dali Liluashvili =

Russian judoka (born 1999)

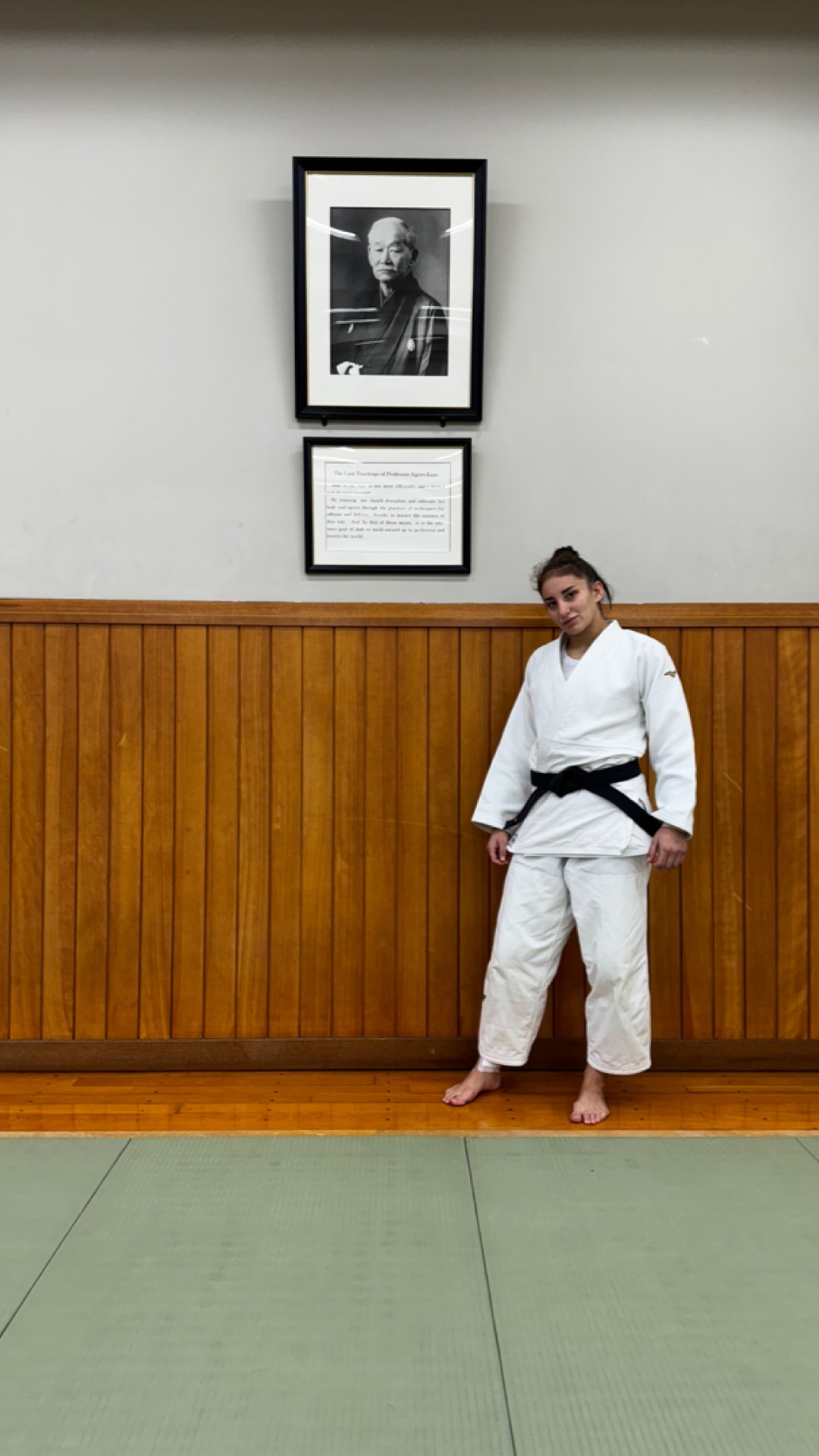
- Dali in Tokyo, Japan

Personal information
- Native name: Дали Ладовна Лилуашвили
- Full name: Dali Ladovna Liluashvili
- Born: 5 May 1999 (age 27) Magnitogorsk, Chelyabinsk Oblast, Russia
- Occupation: Judoka
- Height: 170 cm (5 ft 7 in)

Sport
- Country: Russia
- Sport: Judo
- Weight class: ‍–‍63 kg, ‍–‍70 kg
- Rank: 1st dan black belt
- Club: Turbostroitel (Saint-Petersburg)

Achievements and titles
- World Champ.: R16 (2024)
- European Champ.: R16 (2026)
Medal record
Women's judo
Representing Russia
IJF Grand Slam
Silver medal – second place	2026 Astana	‍–‍63 kg
Bronze medal – third place	2026 Ulaanbaatar	‍–‍63 kg
Representing Individual Neutral Athletes
IJF Grand Slam
Silver medal – second place	2024 Antalya	‍–‍63 kg
Silver medal – second place	2024 Dushanbe	‍–‍63 kg

Profile at external databases
- IJF: 22608
- JudoInside.com: 27448
- Updated on 21 June 2026

Dali Ladovna Liluashvili (Russian: Дали Ладовна Лилуашвили, born 5 May 1999) is a Russian judoka. 2022 Russian national champion. 2024 Antalya and 2024 Dushanbe Grand Slam runner-up.

== Background ==
Liluashvili was born in Magnitogorsk, Chelyabinsk oblast, Russia. She started judo at the age of seven. Her first coach was Sergey Shcherbinin.

== Career ==
=== Age-group ===
Liluashvili has won accolades on the international circuit. In 2016 at the cadet level, Dali finished in third place at the European Cup events in Coimbra, Portugal, and Tver, Russia. She also earned bronze at the 2018 Junior European Cup in A Coruña, Spain. In 2019, she took the silver medal from the junior European Cup in Lignano Sabbiadoro, Italy, and later won the Junior European Cup in Poznań, Poland. At the 2019 junior world championships in Marrakesh, Morocco she was runner-up as a Russian team member. Dali has also won distinction in national competition, twice winning the Russian junior national championship (2017, 2018). At the U23 level, she claimed gold medals the Russian championships in 2020 and 2021.

=== As a senior athlete ===
Dali competed at the 2017 European cup in Orenburg, Russia and won the bronze medal. In 2019, she won the Russian national cup at 70 kilos. In 2021, she won the Asian cup in Aktau, Kazakhstan, European cup in Orenburg, Russia and the CIS Games in Kazan, Russia. At the World Championships in Budapest, Hungary she was 5th in the team competition. In 2022, she won the Russian national championships, held in Yekaterinburg. At the 2024 Judo Grand Slam Antalya Liluashvili finished in second place. In addition, she had the silver medal from the 2024 Dushanbe Grand Slam. In June 2024, she earned a quota place for the 2024 Summer Olympics held in Paris, France, as an independent neutral athlete, but the Russian Judo Federation did not allow her to compete. In May 2026, she won the silver medal at the Grand Slam Astana. In the quarterfinals she beat world champion Joanne van Lieshout of the Netherlands. On June 20, 2026 she came third at the Ulaanbaatar Grand slam.

== Achievements ==
Year	Tournament	Place	Weight class
2017	European cup	3rd	−63 kg
2021	Asian cup	1st	−63 kg
2021	European cup	1st	−63 kg
2024	Grand Slam Antalya	2nd	−63 kg
2024	Grand Slam Dushanbe	2nd	−63 kg
2026	Grand Slam Astana	2nd	−63 kg
2026	Grand slam Ulaanbaatar	3rd	−63 kg

== Personal life ==
She is of Georgian ethnicity. Until October 2024, she trained in Rodina judo and sambo club based in Yekaterinburg, Sverdlovsk Oblast. Currently, she lives and trains in Saint-Petersburg, Russia.
