= Katarina Krišto =

Croatian judoka (born 2002)

Personal information
- Born: 20 March 2002 (age 24)
- Occupation: Judoka

Sport
- Country: Croatia
- Sport: Judo
- Weight class: ‍–‍63 kg

Achievements and titles
- Olympic Games: 5th (2024)
- World Champ.: R32 (2024, 2025)
- European Champ.: 5th (2024)
Medal record
Women's judo
Representing Croatia
IJF Grand Slam
Gold medal – first place	2024 Astana	‍–‍63 kg
Silver medal – second place	2024 Paris	‍–‍63 kg
Bronze medal – third place	2024 Antalya	‍–‍63 kg
IJF Grand Prix
Gold medal – first place	2023 Dushanbe	‍–‍63 kg
Silver medal – second place	2025 Gold Coast	‍–‍63 kg
World Juniors Championships
Bronze medal – third place	2021 Olbia	‍–‍63 kg
European Junior Championships
Gold medal – first place	2021 Luxembourg	‍–‍63 kg
World Cadets Championships
Bronze medal – third place	2019 Almaty	‍–‍63 kg

Profile at external databases
- IJF: 36345
- JudoInside.com: 103664
- Updated on 3 November 2025

Katarina Krišto (born 20 March 2002) is a Croatian judoka. She competed at the 2024 Summer Olympics where she reached the semi-final.

== Career ==
Krišto is a member of the Dalmacijacement judo club in Kaštel Sućurac, within the town of Kaštela in Dalmatia, Croatia. She has been coached consistently from a young age by Josip Barić, with their partnership being over ten years long by the time of the 2024 Olympic Games.

She won a gold medal at the 2021 European Junior Judo Championships in 2021 She won a bronze medal at the 2021 World Judo Juniors Championships in Italy.

In 2022, she had to overcome knee surgery but just two months later recorded a firth place at the World Junior Championships. Unfortunately, however, she suffered an elbow injury in the semi-finals of the championships, the rehabilitation from which took more than four months.

In 2023, she triumphed at the 2023 Judo Grand Prix Dushanbe in Dushanbe, Tajikistan. She won a bronze medal at the European Open in Sofia, Bulgaria in 2023.

She had a fifth-place finish at the 2024 European Judo Championships in the women's 63 kg category, in Zagreb. She won a silver at the 2024 Judo Grand Slam Paris in February 2024. She won a bronze medal at the 2024 Judo Grand Slam Antalya. She then won gold at 2024 Judo Grand Slam Astana.

She competed at the 2024 Paris Olympics in the Women's 63 kg. She defeated Miku Takaichi on the way to reaching the semi-finals. She was initially awarded the win in her bronze medal match against Laura Fazliu but her winning waza-ari score was overturned by the judges for a gripping infringement and a third shido gave the result in favour of Fazliu.
