= Kamila Badurova =

Russian judoka (born 1995)

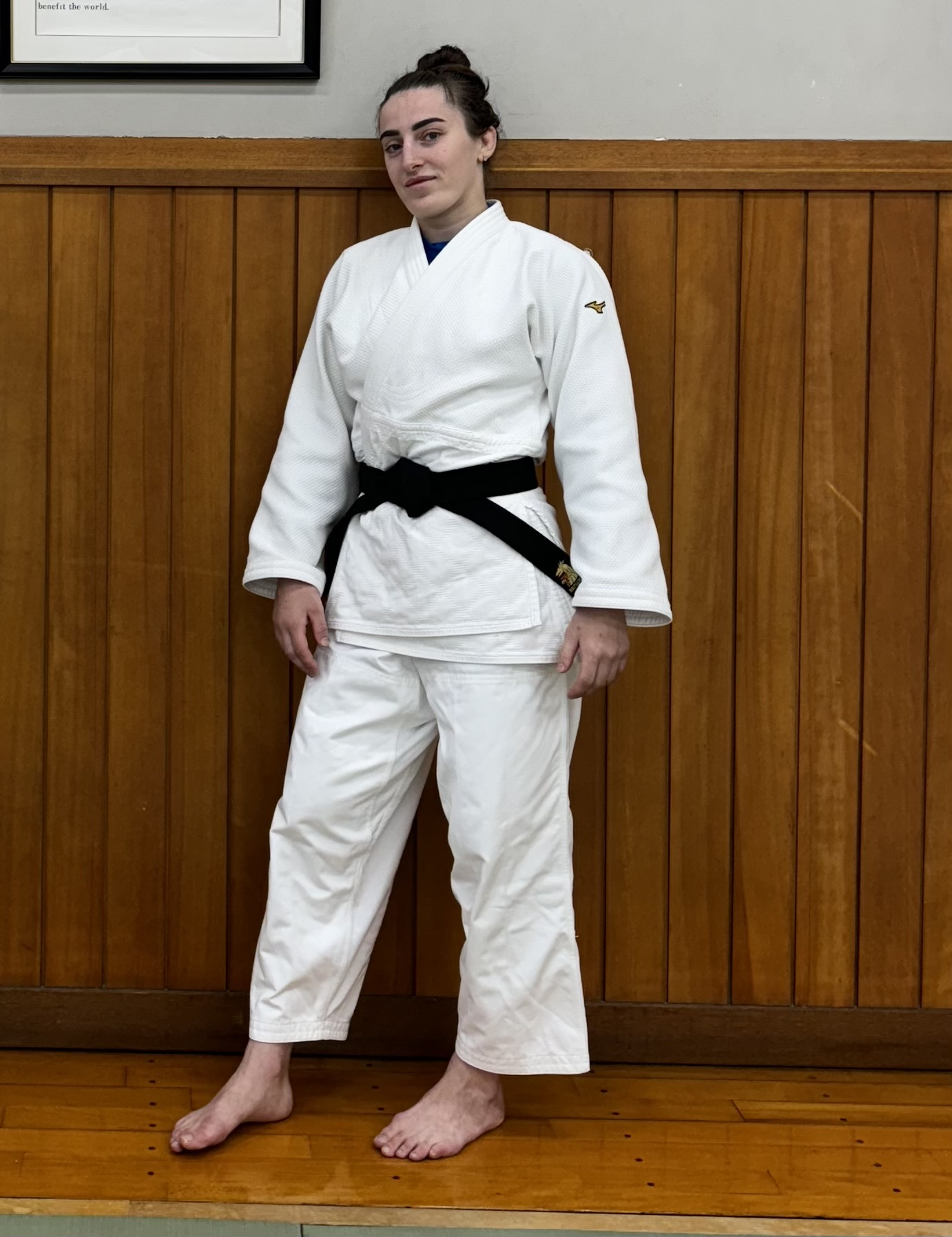

Personal information
- Full name: Kamila Ainievna Badurova
- Nationality: Russian
- Born: 10 August 1995 (age 31) Saint Petersburg, Russia
- Occupation: Judoka
- Military career
- Allegiance: Russia
- Branch: Russian Armed Forces
- Rank: Warrant officer

Sport
- Country: Russia
- Sport: Judo
- Weight class: ‍–‍63 kg
- Club: Rodina judo and sambo club (Yekaterinburg)

Achievements and titles
- World Champ.: R16 (2023)
- European Champ.: R16 (2023)
Medal record
Women's judo
Representing the IJF
IJF Grand Slam
| Bronze medal – third place | 2022 Ulaanbaatar | ‍–‍63 kg |
Representing Russia
World Championships
| Bronze medal – third place | 2018 Baku | Mixed team |
European Championships
| Gold medal – first place | 2026 Belgrade | Mixed team |
European U23 Championships
| Silver medal – second place | 2016 Tel Aviv | ‍–‍63 kg |
| Silver medal – second place | 2017 Podgorica | ‍–‍63 kg |
Summer Universiade
| Bronze medal – third place | 2019 Naples | ‍–‍63 kg |
| Silver medal – second place | 2019 Napoli | Women's team |
Military World Games
| Silver medal – second place | 2019 Wuhan | ‍–‍63 kg |

Profile at external databases
- IJF: 22440
- JudoInside.com: 75790
- Updated on 10 May 2023

Kamila Ainievna Badurova (Russian: Камила Айниевна Бадурова; born 10 August 1995) is a Russian judoka. She competed at the 2018 World Judo Championships and won a medal. Badurova is a warrant officer of the Russian Armed Forces.
