= Kim Ji-su (judoka) =

South Korean judoka (born 2000)

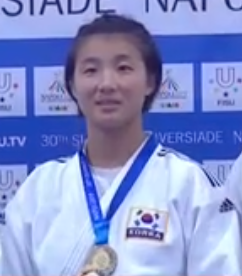
- At the 2019 Summer University Games

Personal information
- Born: 12 December 2000 (age 25) Himeji, Japan
- Occupation: Judoka

Sport
- Country: South Korea
- Sport: Judo
- Weight class: ‍–‍63 kg

Achievements and titles
- Olympic Games: 7th (2024)
- World Champ.: R16 (2019)
- Asian Champ.: (silver) (2021)
Medal record
Women's judo
Representing South Korea
Olympic Games
Bronze medal – third place	2024 Paris	Mixed team
Asian Championships
Silver medal – second place	2021 Bishkek	‍–‍57 kg
Bronze medal – third place	2024 Hong Kong	‍–‍63 kg
Bronze medal – third place	2026 Ordos	‍–‍63 kg
IJF Grand Slam
Gold medal – first place	2023 Astana	‍–‍63 kg
Gold medal – first place	2024 Antalya	‍–‍63 kg
Bronze medal – third place	2018 Paris	‍–‍57 kg
Bronze medal – third place	2019 Paris	‍–‍57 kg
Bronze medal – third place	2024 Tbilisi	‍–‍63 kg
IJF Grand Prix
Silver medal – second place	2023 Zagreb	‍–‍63 kg
Silver medal – second place	2026 Qingdao	‍–‍63 kg
Bronze medal – third place	2023 Perth	‍–‍63 kg
World Juniors Championships
Bronze medal – third place	2017 Zagreb	‍–‍57 kg
Bronze medal – third place	2019 Marrakesh	‍–‍57 kg
Asian Junior Championships
Gold medal – first place	2017 Bishkek	‍–‍57 kg
Summer Universiade
Bronze medal – third place	2019 Naples	‍–‍57 kg

Profile at external databases
- IJF: 40541
- JudoInside.com: 110334
- Updated on 27 June 2026

Kim Ji-su (born 12 December 2000) is a South Korean judoka.

Kim participated at the 2018 World Judo Championships, winning a medal. In 2021, Kim won the silver medal in her event at the 2021 Asian-Pacific Judo Championships held in Bishkek, Kyrgyzstan.

Kim competed in the women's 57 kg event at the 2020 Summer Olympics held in Tokyo, Japan.
