= Esmigul Kuyulova =

Kazakh judoka (born 2002)

Personal information
- Born: 11 May 2002 (age 24)
- Occupation: Judoka

Sport
- Country: Kazakhstan
- Sport: Judo
- Weight class: ‍–‍63 kg

Achievements and titles
- Olympic Games: R32 (2024)
- World Champ.: R16 (2024)
- Asian Champ.: (bronze) (2023, 2024, 2026)
Medal record
Women's judo
Representing Kazakhstan
Asian Games
Silver medal – second place	2026 Aichi‑Nagoya	Mixed team
Bronze medal – third place	2023 Hangzhou	‍–‍63 kg
Bronze medal – third place	2026 Aichi‑Nagoya	‍–‍63 kg
Asian Championships
Bronze medal – third place	2024 Hong Kong	‍–‍63 kg
Bronze medal – third place	2024 Hong Kong	Mixed team
Bronze medal – third place	2026 Ordos	‍–‍63 kg

Profile at external databases
- IJF: 63266
- JudoInside.com: 114453
- Updated on 1 October 2026

Esmigul Kuyulova (born 11 May 2002) is a Kazakh judoka. She was a bronze medalist at the 2022 Asian Games and selected for the 2024 Summer Olympics.

== Career ==
Kuyulova won a gold medal at the Junior European Cup in Málaga in 2022. She won a bronze medal at the Junior European Cup in Graz in 2022. She won silver at the senior European Cup in Dubrovnik in 2023. She was a bronze medalist in the women's 63 kg at the delayed 2022 Asian Games in Hangzhou in September 2023.

She was a bronze medalist at the 2024 Asian Judo Championships in Hong Kong in the women's 63 kg. She also won a bronze medal in the mixed team competition at the event.

She was selected for the 2024 Paris Olympics in the women's 63kg.

== Personal life ==
She is from Tashkent.
