= Laura Fazliu =

Kosovan judoka (born 2000)

Personal information
- Born: 28 September 2000 (age 26) Mitrovicë, FR Yugoslavia (now Kosovo)
- Occupation: Judoka

Sport
- Country: Kosovo
- Sport: Judo
- Weight class: ‍–‍63 kg

Achievements and titles
- Olympic Games: (bronze) (2024)
- World Champ.: (bronze) (2024, 2025)
- European Champ.: (silver) (2022)
Medal record
Women's judo
Representing Kosovo
Olympic Games
Bronze medal – third place	2024 Paris	‍–‍63 kg
World Championships
Bronze medal – third place	2024 Abu Dhabi	‍–‍63 kg
Bronze medal – third place	2025 Budapest	‍–‍63 kg
European Championships
Silver medal – second place	2022 Sofia	‍–‍63 kg
Bronze medal – third place	2023 Montpellier	‍–‍63 kg
World Masters
Gold medal – first place	2023 Budapest	‍–‍63 kg
Silver medal – second place	2022 Jerusalem	‍–‍63 kg
IJF Grand Slam
Silver medal – second place	2023 Tbilisi	‍–‍63 kg
Bronze medal – third place	2023 Tel Aviv	‍–‍63 kg
Bronze medal – third place	2023 Astana	‍–‍63 kg
Bronze medal – third place	2026 Abu Dhabi	‍–‍63 kg
IJF Grand Prix
Silver medal – second place	2026 Linz	‍–‍63 kg
Bronze medal – third place	2021 Zagreb	‍–‍63 kg
Bronze medal – third place	2025 Linz	‍–‍63 kg
Bronze medal – third place	2026 Qingdao	‍–‍63 kg
European U23 Championships
Gold medal – first place	2022 Sarajevo	‍–‍63 kg
Bronze medal – third place	2020 Poreč	‍–‍63 kg
World Juniors Championships
Bronze medal – third place	2019 Marrakesh	‍–‍63 kg
European Junior Championships
Silver medal – second place	2020 Poreč	‍–‍63 kg
Bronze medal – third place	2019 Vantaa	‍–‍63 kg
European Cadet Championships
Bronze medal – third place	2017 Kaunas	‍–‍63 kg
World University Games
Silver medal – second place	2025 Essen	‍–‍63 kg
Mediterranean Games
Gold medal – first place	2022 Oran	‍–‍63 kg
Silver medal – second place	2026 Taranto	‍–‍63 kg

Profile at external databases
- IJF: 26182
- JudoInside.com: 107242
- Updated on 31 October 2026

Laura Fazliu (born 28 September 2000) is a Kosovan judoka who has won Olympic, World and European Championship medals in women's 63 kg category. She won a silver medal at the 2022 European Judo Championships, a bronze medal at the 2024 Summer Olympics, and a bronze medal at the 2024 World Judo Championships.

== Career ==
Fazliu lost her bronze medal match in the women's 63 kg event at the 2018 Mediterranean Games held in Tarragona, Spain.

In 2021, Fazliu lost her bronze medal match in the women's 63 kg event to finish fifth at the European Judo Championships held in Lisbon, Portugal. She also competed in the women's 63 kg event at the 2021 World Judo Championships held in Budapest, Hungary, where she was knocked out in the second round.

In 2022, Fazliu won the silver medal in the women's 63 kg event at the 2022 European Judo Championships held in Sofia, Bulgaria. The same year, she won the gold medal in the women's 63 kg event at the 2022 Mediterranean Games held in Oran, Algeria.

In May 2024, Fazliu lost in the quarter finals of the women's 63 kg event at the World Judo Championships, but won two repechage matches to win a bronze medal. In July that year, Fazliu won the bronze medal match in the women's 63 kg event at the 2024 Paris Olympic Games held in Paris, France, after defeating Croatian competitor Katarina Krišto.

Fazliu took a break after the 2024 Olympics, returning to competition in the women's 63 kg event at the 2025 Judo Grand Prix Linz. In Linz she lost in the semi finals to Japanese judoka So Morichika, before winning the bronze medal match against Joni Geilen of the Netherlands.
