= Prisca Awiti Alcaraz =

Mexican judoka (born 1996)

Personal information
- Full name: Prisca Guadalupe Awiti Alcaraz
- Nationality: Mexican; British
- Born: 20 February 1996 (age 30) London, England
- Education: University of Bath
- Occupation: Judoka

Sport
- Country: Mexico
- Sport: Judo
- Weight class: ‍–‍63 kg

Achievements and titles
- Olympic Games: (silver) (2024)
- World Champ.: 5th (2023)
- Pan American Champ.: (2021, 2023)
Medal record
Women's judo
Representing Mexico
Olympic Games
Silver medal – second place	2024 Paris	‍–‍63 kg
Pan American Games
Bronze medal – third place	2023 Santiago	‍–‍63 kg
Pan American Championships
Silver medal – second place	2021 Guadalajara	‍–‍63 kg
Silver medal – second place	2023 Calgary	‍–‍63 kg
IJF Grand Slam
Silver medal – second place	2023 Tashkent	‍–‍63 kg
IJF Grand Prix
Bronze medal – third place	2022 Perth	‍–‍63 kg
Bronze medal – third place	2023 Linz	‍–‍63 kg
Bronze medal – third place	2023 Zagreb	‍–‍63 kg
Central American and Caribbean Games
Gold medal – first place	2023 San Salvador	‍–‍63 kg
Silver medal – second place	2026 Santo Domingo	‍–‍63 kg

Profile at external databases
- IJF: 41989
- JudoInside.com: 73272
- Updated on 27 July 2026

Prisca Guadalupe Awiti Alcaraz (born 20 February 1996) is a judoka. Born and raised in England, she represented Mexico at the 2024 Summer Olympics, where she won a silver medal, becoming the first Mexican athlete to win an Olympic medal in judo.

== Early life and education ==
Awiti-Alcaraz was born in Enfield, Greater London, England to Kenyan father Xavier and Mexican mother María Dolores. Her mother hails from León, Guanajuato.

Before getting into judo, Awiti Alcaraz swam and did gymnastics. Her brothers Philip, Joshua, Samy, and Micheal as well as her cousins all joined Enfield Judo Club.

Awiti Alcaraz studied sports performance at the University of Bath and was a member of the Team Bath Sports Training Village.

== Career ==
Through her mother, Awiti Alcaraz has represented Mexico since 2017 and relocated to Mexico from the U.K. full-time in 2022. She battled back from a shoulder injury to win the silver medal at the Panamerican Senior Championships in Guadalajara in April 2021. She was selected to compete at the 2020 Summer Games and was drawn against Boldyn Gankhaich in the opening round.
