= Joanne van Lieshout =

Dutch judoka (born 2002)

Personal information
- Nationality: Dutch
- Born: 8 November 2002 (age 24)
- Occupation: Judoka

Sport
- Country: Netherlands
- Sport: Judo
- Weight class: ‍–‍63 kg

Achievements and titles
- Olympic Games: R16 (2024)
- World Champ.: (gold) (2024)
- European Champ.: (gold) (2026)
- Highest world ranking: 1^{st}
Medal record
Women's judo
Representing the Netherlands
World Championships
Gold medal – first place	2024 Abu Dhabi	‍–‍63 kg
Bronze medal – third place	2023 Doha	‍–‍63 kg
European Championships
Gold medal – first place	2026 Tbilisi	‍–‍63 kg
Silver medal – second place	2024 Zagreb	‍–‍63 kg
Bronze medal – third place	2025 Podgorica	‍–‍63 kg
IJF Grand Slam
Silver medal – second place	2026 Tbilisi	‍–‍63 kg
Silver medal – second place	2026 Ulaanbaatar	‍–‍63 kg
Bronze medal – third place	2022 Abu Dhabi	‍–‍63 kg
Bronze medal – third place	2023 Astana	‍–‍63 kg
Bronze medal – third place	2023 Tokyo	‍–‍63 kg
Bronze medal – third place	2024 Baku	‍–‍63 kg
Bronze medal – third place	2024 Tbilisi	‍–‍63 kg
Bronze medal – third place	2024 Abu Dhabi	‍–‍63 kg
Bronze medal – third place	2026 Paris	‍–‍63 kg
IJF Grand Prix
Gold medal – first place	2022 Almada	‍–‍63 kg
Gold medal – first place	2024 Linz	‍–‍63 kg
Bronze medal – third place	2026 Zagreb	‍–‍63 kg
European U23 Championships
Gold medal – first place	2020 Poreč	‍–‍63 kg
World Juniors Championships
Gold medal – first place	2021 Olbia	‍–‍63 kg
Gold medal – first place	2022 Guayaquil	‍–‍63 kg
European Junior Championships
Bronze medal – third place	2020 Poreč	‍–‍63 kg
Bronze medal – third place	2021 Luxembourg	‍–‍63 kg
European Cadet Championships
Bronze medal – third place	2018 Sarajevo	‍–‍57 kg
European Youth Olympic Festival
Gold medal – first place	2019 Baku	‍–‍63 kg

Profile at external databases
- IJF: 36771
- JudoInside.com: 94559
- Updated on 15 November 2026

Joanne van Lieshout (born 8 November 2002) is a Dutch judoka.

van Lieshout is the gold medalist from the 2022 Judo Grand Prix Almada in the ‍–‍63 kg category.
