= Angelika Szymańska =

Polish judoka (born 1999)

Personal information
- Born: 16 October 1999 (age 27) Włocławek, Poland
- Occupation: Judoka

Sport
- Country: Poland
- Sport: Judo
- Weight class: ‍–‍63 kg

Achievements and titles
- Olympic Games: R16 (2024)
- World Champ.: (silver) (2024)
- European Champ.: (bronze) (2023, 2026)
Medal record
Women's judo
Representing Poland
World Championships
Silver medal – second place	2024 Abu Dhabi	‍–‍63 kg
European Championships
Bronze medal – third place	2023 Montpellier	‍–‍63 kg
Bronze medal – third place	2026 Tbilisi	‍–‍63 kg
World Masters
Bronze medal – third place	2022 Jerusalem	‍–‍63 kg
IJF Grand Slam
Gold medal – first place	2023 Baku	‍–‍63 kg
Gold medal – first place	2026 Lausanne	‍–‍63 kg
Gold medal – first place	2026 Abu Dhabi	‍–‍63 kg
Silver medal – second place	2022 Budapest	‍–‍63 kg
Silver medal – second place	2024 Tbilisi	‍–‍63 kg
Bronze medal – third place	2021 Paris	‍–‍63 kg
Bronze medal – third place	2022 Paris	‍–‍63 kg
Bronze medal – third place	2023 Paris	‍–‍63 kg
Bronze medal – third place	2023 Tbilisi	‍–‍63 kg
Bronze medal – third place	2026 Tashkent	‍–‍63 kg
IJF Grand Prix
Silver medal – second place	2025 Zagreb	‍–‍63 kg
Bronze medal – third place	2025 Qingdao	‍–‍63 kg
European U23 Championships
Gold medal – first place	2021 Budapest	‍–‍63 kg
Silver medal – second place	2020 Poreč	‍–‍63 kg
European Junior Championships
Silver medal – second place	2018 Sofia	‍–‍63 kg

Profile at external databases
- IJF: 18530
- JudoInside.com: 64094
- Updated on 31 October 2026

Angelika Szymańska (born 16 October 1999) is a Polish judoka who competes in international judo competitions. She is a two-time Grand Slam bronze medalist, a European U23 champion and European Junior silver medalist. Szymańska began judo in 2007 and was trained by Olympic silver medalist Aneta Szczepańska and Roman Stawisiński.
