= Lubjana Piovesana =

British-Austrian judoka (born 1997)

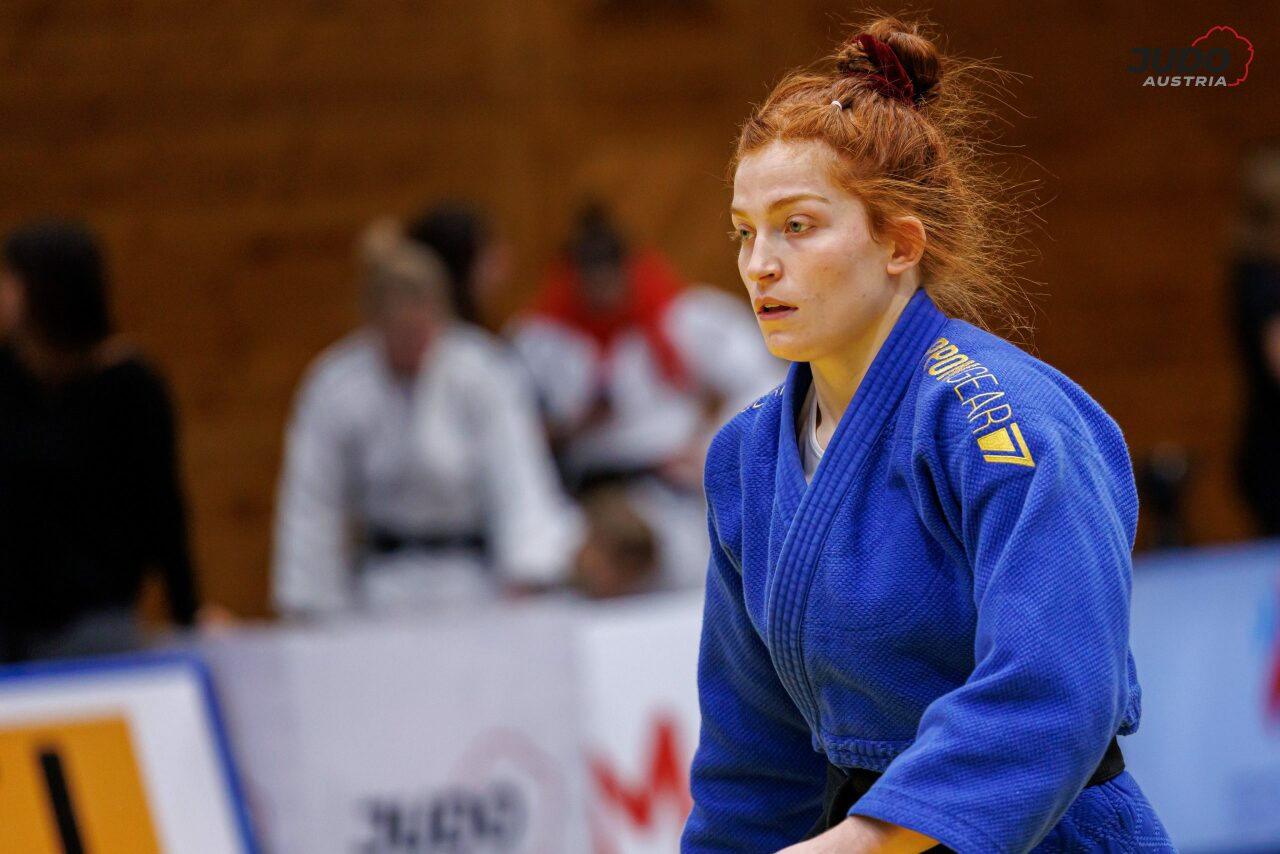
- Lubjana Piovesana (blue) participates in the Austrian Frauen Bundesliga 2022

Personal information
- Nickname: Lulu
- Nationality: British, Austrian
- Born: 3 January 1997 (age 29)
- Occupation: Judoka

Sport
- Country: Great Britain (until 2021); Austria (since 2023)
- Sport: Judo
- Weight class: ‍–‍63 kg
- Rank: 1st dan black belt
- League: German Bundesliga; Austrian Bundesliga; Champions League (2019)
- Club: LZ Hohenems
- Team: TSG Backnang; UJZ Mühlviertel

Achievements and titles
- Olympic Games: 5th (2024)
- World Champ.: 5th (2023)
- European Champ.: 5th (2024, 2025)
- Highest world ranking: 5
Medal record
Women's judo
Representing Austria
IJF Grand Slam
Gold medal – first place	2024 Baku	‍–‍63 kg
Gold medal – first place	2024 Dushanbe	‍–‍63 kg
Bronze medal – third place	2023 Abu Dhabi	‍–‍63 kg
Bronze medal – third place	2025 Baku	‍–‍63 kg
Bronze medal – third place	2025 Dushanbe	‍–‍63 kg
Bronze medal – third place	2026 Dushanbe	‍–‍63 kg
Bronze medal – third place	2026 Ulaanbaatar	‍–‍63 kg
IJF Grand Prix
Bronze medal – third place	2023 Zagreb	‍–‍63 kg
Representing Great Britain
IJF Grand Prix
Bronze medal – third place	2017 Antalya	‍–‍63 kg
Bronze medal – third place	2017 Cancún	‍–‍63 kg
Bronze medal – third place	2018 Tbilisi	‍–‍63 kg
Bronze medal – third place	2019 Marrakesh	‍–‍63 kg
European U23 Championships
Gold medal – first place	2018 Győr	‍–‍63 kg
World Juniors Championships
Bronze medal – third place	2017 Zagreb	‍–‍63 kg
World Cadets Championships
Bronze medal – third place	2013 Miami	‍–‍63 kg
European Cadet Championships
Bronze medal – third place	2014 Athens	‍–‍63 kg

Profile at external databases
- IJF: 72508
- JudoInside.com: 72037
- Updated on 21 June 2026

Lubjana Piovesana (born 3 January 1997) is a British and Austrian judoka. She has won two gold medals in Judo Grand Slam events and took part in the 2024 Summer Olympics.

== Judo career ==
Piovesana is the 2018 U23 European Champion. In 2019 she was the youngest judoka from Great Britain on the IJF World Tour. She is a bronze medalist from the 2019 Judo Grand Prix Marrakesh in the ‍–‍63 kg category.

She collected 1811 points in the IJF Olympic Ranking and did not qualify for the Summer Games in Tokyo with 35th place in her weight class.

In January 2023 Piovesana became part of the Austria National Team. She won gold at the 2024 Judo Grand Slam Baku in the ‍–‍63 kg category. She was top seed at the 2024 Judo Grand Slam Dushanbe and won a gold medal at the event in the same category.

=== 2024 Summer Olympics ===
Lubjana Piovesana took part in the 2024 Olympic Games in both the weight class ‍–‍63 kg and in the mixed team (together with Katharina Tanzer, Michaela Polleres, Samuel Gaßner, Wachid Borchashvili and Aaron Fara). She reached the final block in her weight class and fought her way into a duel for bronze. There she lost to the Frenchwoman Clarisse Agbegnenou with an ippon score by throw and took fifth place. The first encounter in the mixed team competition against Germany ended 4–1 and the Austrian team took ninth place.

== Club championships ==
Piovesana fought for TSG Backnang in the German Judo Bundesliga in 2019, 2023 and 2024.

In 2022 Piovesana fought in the Austrian Damen-Bundesliga for the team UJZ Mühlviertel. Piovesana won three out of the four matches she took part in. Her only loss came against Michaela Polleres.

== Personal life ==
Piovesana is in a relationship with Laurin Boehler. Piovesana's younger brother was found dead in England in March 2025.
