= Gili Sharir =

Israeli judoka (born 1999)

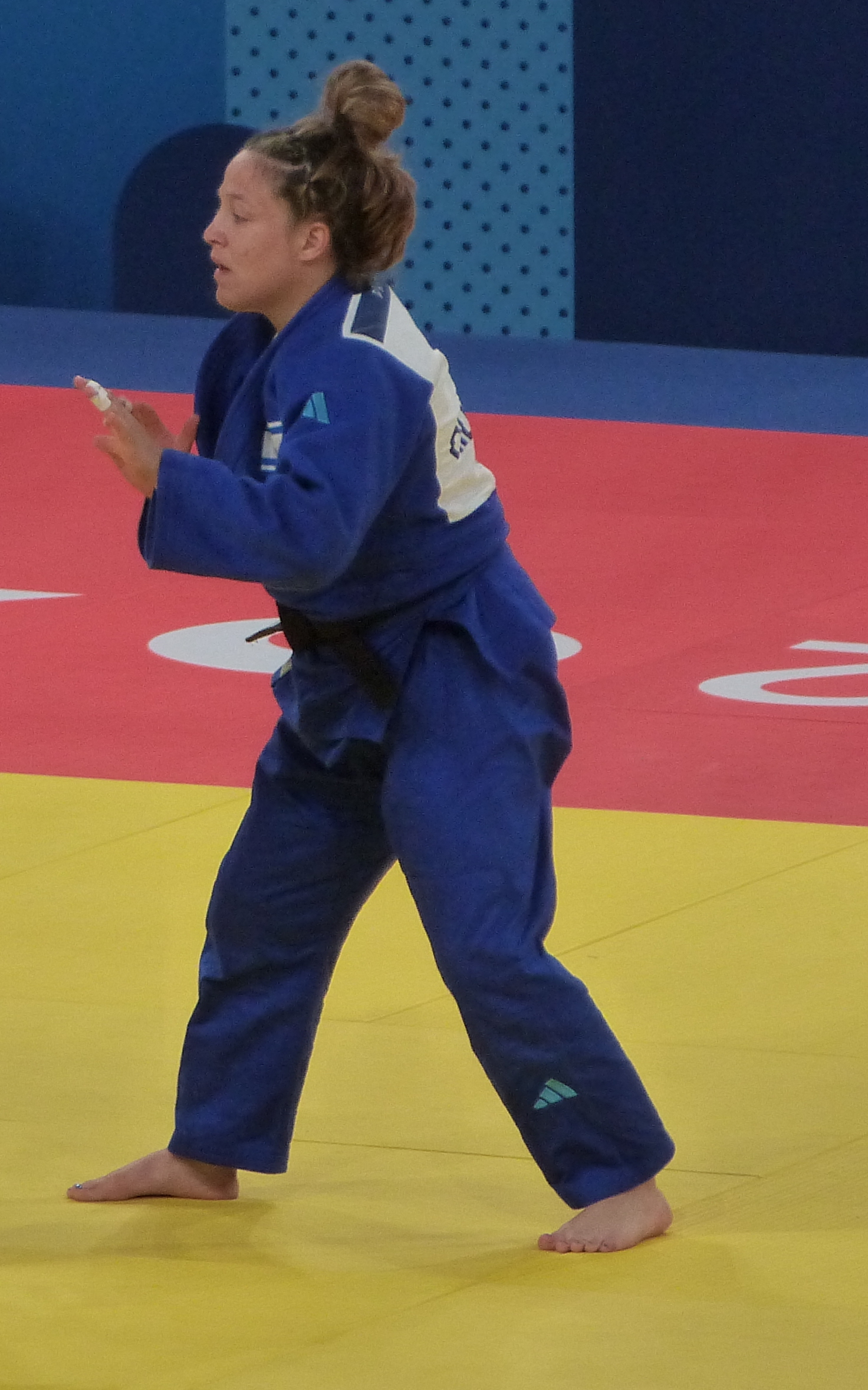
- Sharir in 2024

Personal information
- Native name: גילי שריר
- Born: 22 November 1999 (age 26)
- Occupation: Judoka

Sport
- Country: Israel
- Sport: Judo
- Weight class: ‍–‍63 kg
- Rank: 4th dan black belt

Achievements and titles
- Olympic Games: R32 (2020, 2024)
- World Champ.: R16 (2018, 2019, 2022, 2023)
- European Champ.: (silver) (2023)
- Highest world ranking: 3^{rd}
Medal record
Women's judo
Representing Israel
Olympic Games
Bronze medal – third place	2020 Tokyo	Mixed team
World Championships
Bronze medal – third place	2022 Tashkent	Mixed team
European Championships
Silver medal – second place	2023 Montpellier	‍–‍63 kg
Bronze medal – third place	2022 Sofia	‍–‍63 kg
World Masters
Bronze medal – third place	2022 Jerusalem	‍–‍63 kg
IJF Grand Slam
Gold medal – first place	2023 Paris	‍–‍63 kg
Silver medal – second place	2022 Ulaanbaatar	‍–‍63 kg
Bronze medal – third place	2022 Abu Dhabi	‍–‍63 kg
Bronze medal – third place	2023 Ulaanbaatar	‍–‍63 kg
Bronze medal – third place	2023 Baku	‍–‍63 kg
IJF Grand Prix
Gold medal – first place	2025 Zagreb	‍–‍63 kg
Silver medal – second place	2018 Hohhot	‍–‍63 kg
Bronze medal – third place	2026 Linz	‍–‍63 kg
European U23 Championships
Bronze medal – third place	2017 Podgorica	‍–‍63 kg
European Junior Championships
Silver medal – second place	2017 Maribor	‍–‍63 kg

Profile at external databases
- IJF: 20212
- JudoInside.com: 51630
- Updated on 8 March 2026

Gili Sharir (Hebrew: גילי שריר; born 22 November 1999) is an Israeli judoka and Olympic bronze medalist, having won a bronze medal in mixed team event at the 2020 Summer Olympics. Sharir also won a bronze at the mixed team event of the 2022 World Championships. At the European Championships, she won a bronze medal in 2022 and a silver medal in 2023. Sharir represented Israel at the 2024 Paris Olympics in judo in the women's 63 kg, and in the mixed team event, at which Team Israel came in ninth.

== Early life ==
Sharir grew up in moshav Mazor in Israel, where her parents Danit and Danny still reside, and is Jewish.

== Judo career ==
=== 2016–20; European junior championships silver medal ===
Sharir won the gold medals at the 2016 European Cup U21 Athens in Greece, and the European Cup Cadets Antalya in Turkey, and a silver medal at the European Cup Cadets Coimbra in Portugal. She also won the silver medal at the 2016 Israeli U21 Championships in Ra'anana.

Sharir won the silver medal at the 2017 European Junior Championships in Maribor, Slovenia, and a bronze at the 2017 European U23 Championships in Podgorica in Montenegro. She also won a bronze medal at the 2017 European Cup Sarajevo. She won the gold medal at the 2017 Israeli Championships in Ra'anana.

At the 2018 Hohhot Grand Prix, Sharir won the silver medal. She won the gold medal at the 2018 Israeli Championships in Tel Aviv. She also won the gold medal at the 2018 Israeli U21 Championships in Haifa.

=== 2020 Tokyo Olympics (in 2021); bronze medal ===
Sharir represented Israel at the 2020 Summer Olympics, competing at the women's 63 kg weight category. She lost in the first round to the five-time Oceanian Champion, Australian Katharina Haecker. Sharir a bronze medal in the mixed team event.

=== 2021–2023; European championship silver medal ===
At the 2022 European Championships in Sofia, Bulgaria, Sharir won a bronze medal. At the 2022 World Championships, she won a bronze medal in the mixed team event. she won a silver medal at the 2022 Ulaanbaatar Grand Slam and bronze medals at the 2022 Abu Dhabi Grand Slam and the 2022 World Masters in Jerusalem, Israel.

Sharir won a silver medal at the 2023 European Championships in Montpellier, France. She dedicated her medal "To all the abducted and murdered (in the 7 October attacks), they were with me every moment in my thoughts, they gave me a lot of strength and motivation.". Sharir won a gold medal at the 2023 Paris Grand Slam and bronze medals at the 2023 Ulaanbaatar Grand Slam in Mongolia and the 2023 Baku Grand Slam. She also won the silver medal at the 2023 Israeli Championships in Eilat.

=== 2024 Paris Olympics ===
Sharir represented Israel at the 2024 Paris Olympics in judo in the women's 63 kg, where she was defeated by French reigning Olympic champion judoka Clarisse Agbegnenou, and in the mixed team event, at which Israel came in ninth.

== See also ==
- List of Olympic medalists in judo
- List of 2020 Summer Olympics medal winners
- List of Jewish Olympic medalists
