= Cristina Cabaña =

Spanish judoka (born 1993)

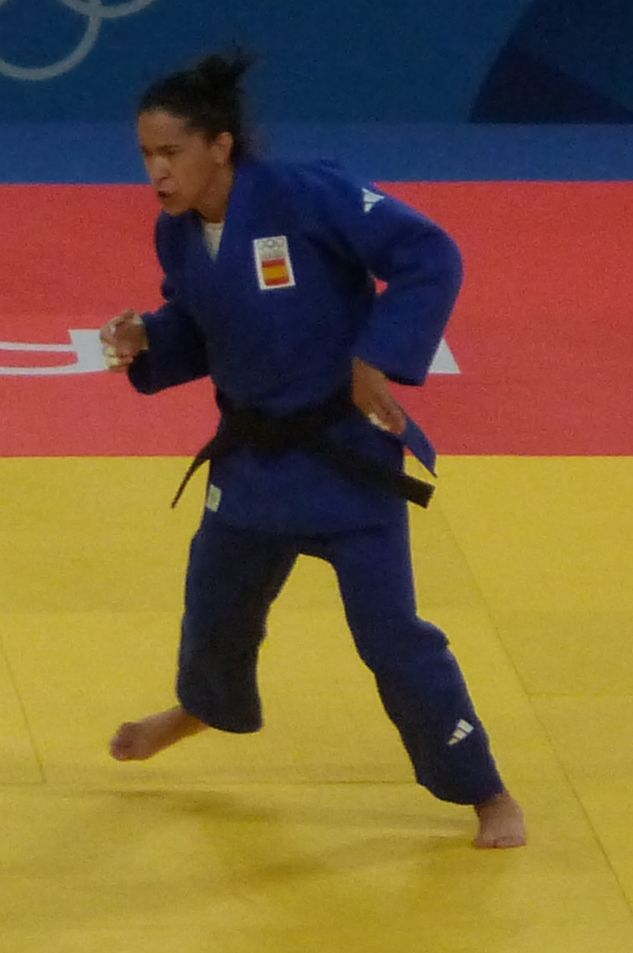
- Cabaña in 2024

Personal information
- Full name: Cristina Cabaña Pérez
- Born: 6 May 1993 (age 33) Mérida, Badajoz, Spain
- Occupation: Judoka
- Height: 165 cm (5 ft 5 in)
- Website: cristinacabana.com

Sport
- Country: Spain
- Sport: Judo
- Weight class: ‍–‍63 kg

Achievements and titles
- Olympic Games: R16 (2020)
- World Champ.: R16 (2021, 2024)
- European Champ.: 5th (2022)
Medal record
Women's judo
Representing Spain
IJF Grand Slam
Bronze medal – third place	2023 Abu Dhabi	‍–‍63 kg
IJF Grand Prix
Bronze medal – third place	2023 Almada	‍–‍63 kg
Mediterranean Games
Silver medal – second place	2022 Oran	‍–‍63 kg

Profile at external databases
- IJF: 16399
- JudoInside.com: 75382
- Updated on 21 May 2024

Cristina Cabaña Pérez (Note: In this Spanish name, the first or paternal surname is Cabaña and the second or maternal family name is Pérez.) (born 6 May 1993) is a Spanish judoka.

Introduced to Judo at school in Merida, Spain, she trains in Brunete, Spain, with her coach Joaquin Ruiz Llorente. She was selected to compete at the 2020 Summer Games and drawn against Kiyomi Watanabe.

She won the silver medal in the women's 63 kg event at the 2022 Mediterranean Games held in Oran, Algeria.

Cabaña also competed for Spain at the 2024 Summer Olympics in the women's 63 kg event.
