= 2022 World Judo Championships – Women's 57 kg =

Judo competition

Judo Women's 57 kg at the 2022 World Judo Championships
- Venue: Humo Ice Dome
- Location: Tashkent, Uzbekistan
- Date: 8 October
- Competitors: 42 from 35 nations
- Total prize money: €57,000

Medalists
gold medal	Rafaela Silva (2nd title)	Brazil
silver medal	Haruka Funakubo	Japan
bronze medal	Jessica Klimkait	Canada
bronze medal	Lkhagvatogoogiin Enkhriilen	Mongolia

Competition at external databases
- Links: IJF • JudoInside

The Women's 57 kg event at the 2022 World Judo Championships was held at the Humo Ice Dome arena in Tashkent, Uzbekistan on 8 October 2022.

== Results ==
=== Finals ===
Semi-finals
(South Korea) Huh Mi-mi	00
(Japan) Haruka Funakubo	10
(Israel) Timna Nelson-Levy	00
(Brazil) Rafaela Silva	10

Final
(Japan) Haruka Funakubo	00
(Brazil) Rafaela Silva	01

=== Repechage ===
Repechage
(Canada) Jessica Klimkait	10
(Georgia (country)) Eteri Liparteliani	00
(Mongolia) Lkhagvatogoogiin Enkhriilen	01
(Ukraine) Daria Bilodid	00

Bronze medal
(Canada) Jessica Klimkait	10
(Israel) Timna Nelson-Levy	00
(Mongolia) Lkhagvatogoogiin Enkhriilen	10
(South Korea) Huh Mi-mi	00

=== Pool A ===
First round
(Kosovo) Flaka Loxha	00
(Poland) Arleta Podolak	10
(Kyrgyzstan) Adina Kochkonbaeva	00
(South Korea) Huh Mi-mi	11

Round of 32
(Canada) Jessica Klimkait	10
(South Africa) Jasmine Martin	00
(Chinese Taipei) Lien Chen-ling	11
(Poland) Arleta Podolak	00
(Belgium) Mina Libeer	01
(Croatia) Tihea Topolovec	00
(Uzbekistan) Shukurjon Aminova	00
(South Korea) Huh Mi-mi	01

Round of 16
(Canada) Jessica Klimkait	10
(Chinese Taipei) Lien Chen-ling	00
(Belgium) Mina Libeer	00
(South Korea) Huh Mi-mi	01

Quarter-finals
(Canada) Jessica Klimkait	00
(South Korea) Huh Mi-mi	10

=== Pool B ===
First round
(China) Cai Qi	00
(Serbia) Marica Perišić	10
(Hungary) Hedvig Karakas	10
(Turkey) Özlem Yıldız	00
(Brazil) Jéssica Lima	10
(Mongolia) Mönkhtsedeviin Ichinkhorloo	00

Round of 32
(Georgia (country)) Eteri Liparteliani	10
(Serbia) Marica Perišić	00
(Italy) Veronica Toniolo	01
(Guinea) Mariana Esteves	00
(Japan) Haruka Funakubo	10
(Hungary) Hedvig Karakas	00
(Brazil) Jéssica Lima	11
(Dominican Republic) Ana Rosa	00

Round of 16
(Georgia (country)) Eteri Liparteliani	10
(Italy) Veronica Toniolo	00
(Japan) Haruka Funakubo	10
(Brazil) Jéssica Lima	00

Quarter-finals
(Georgia (country)) Eteri Liparteliani	00
(Japan) Haruka Funakubo	10

=== Pool C ===
First round
(Slovenia) Kaja Kajzer	10
(Poland) Julia Kowalczyk	00
Muna Dahouk	00
(Mauritius) Christianne Legentil	11
(United States) Mariah Holguin	00
(Canada) Christa Deguchi	10

Round of 32
(Israel) Timna Nelson-Levy	01
(Hungary) Kitti Kovács	00
(Slovenia) Kaja Kajzer	00
(Cuba) Arnaes Odelín	10
(Mongolia) Lkhagvatogoogiin Enkhriilen	10
(Mauritius) Christianne Legentil	00
(Canada) Christa Deguchi	10
(Ivory Coast) Zouleiha Abzetta Dabonne	00

Round of 16
(Israel) Timna Nelson-Levy	10
(Cuba) Arnaes Odelín	00
(Mongolia) Lkhagvatogoogiin Enkhriilen	10
(Canada) Christa Deguchi	00

Quarter-finals
(Israel) Timna Nelson-Levy	01
(Mongolia) Lkhagvatogoogiin Enkhriilen	00

=== Pool D ===
First round
(Germany) Pauline Starke	10
(United Kingdom) Acelya Toprak	00
(Kazakhstan) Sevara Nishanbayeva	00
(Bosnia and Herzegovina) Anđela Samardžić	10

Round of 32
(France) Sarah-Léonie Cysique	01
(Germany) Pauline Starke	00
(Bosnia and Herzegovina) Anđela Samardžić	00
(Ukraine) Daria Bilodid	10
(Brazil) Rafaela Silva	10
(Uzbekistan) Nilufar Ermaganbetova	00
(South Africa) Donne Breytenbach	00
(Bulgaria) Ivelina Ilieva	10

Round of 16
(France) Sarah-Léonie Cysique	00
(Ukraine) Daria Bilodid	10
(Brazil) Rafaela Silva	10
(Bulgaria) Ivelina Ilieva	00

Quarter-finals
(Ukraine) Daria Bilodid	00
(Brazil) Rafaela Silva	10
