= 2023 European Judo Championships – Women's 57 kg =

Judo competition

Judo Women's 57 kg at the 2023 European Judo Championships
- Venue: Sud de France Arena
- Location: Montpellier, France
- Date: 3 November
- Competitors: 28 from 20 nations

Medalists
gold medal	Daria Kurbonmamadova (2nd title)
silver medal	Marica Perišić	Serbia
bronze medal	Sarah-Léonie Cysique	France
bronze medal	Nora Gjakova	Kosovo

Competition at external databases
- Links: IJF • JudoInside

The women's 57 kg competition at the 2023 European Judo Championships was held on 3 November at the Sud de France Arena.

== Results ==
=== Finals ===
Semi-finals
Marica Perišić (SRB)	01
Seija Ballhaus (GER)	00
Pauline Starke (GER)	00
Daria Kurbonmamadova (AIN)	10 (yellow card)

Final
Marica Perišić (SRB)	00
Daria Kurbonmamadova (AIN)	10 (yellow card)

=== Repechage ===
Repechage
Sarah-Léonie Cysique (FRA)	01
Eteri Liparteliani (GEO)	00 (yellow card)
Nora Gjakova (KOS)	w/o
~~Timna Nelson-Levy~~ (ISR)	00

Bronze medal
Sarah-Léonie Cysique (FRA)	02
Pauline Starke (GER)	00
Nora Gjakova (KOS)	10
Seija Ballhaus (GER)	00

=== Pool A ===
First round
Julie Beurskens (NED)	01 (yellow card)
Julia Kowalczyk (POL)	00
Marica Perišić (SRB)	10
Hasret Bozkurt (TUR)	00
Ivelina Ilieva (BUL)	00
Flaka Loxha (KOS)	10

Round of 16
Sarah-Léonie Cysique (FRA)	01 (yellow card)
Julie Beurskens (NED)	00
Marica Perišić (SRB)	10 (yellow card)
Flaka Loxha (KOS)	00

Quarter-finals
Sarah-Léonie Cysique (FRA)	00
Marica Perišić (SRB)	02 (yellow card)

=== Pool B ===
First round
Adriana Rodríguez Salvador (ESP)	00
Kseniia Galitskaia (AIN)	02
Veronica Toniolo (ITA)	10
Mina Libeer (BEL)	00
Seija Ballhaus (GER)	10
Nekoda Smythe-Davis (GBR)	00

Round of 16
Eteri Liparteliani (GEO)	01
Kseniia Galitskaia (AIN)	00 (yellow card)
Veronica Toniolo (ITA)	00
Seija Ballhaus (GER)	10 (yellow card)

Quarter-finals
Eteri Liparteliani (GEO)	00
Seija Ballhaus (GER)	10

=== Pool C ===
First round
Kaja Kajzer (SLO)	00
Arleta Podolak (POL)	10 (yellow card)
Pauline Starke (GER)	10 (yellow card)
Anđela Samardžić (BIH)	00 (yellow card)
Lele Nairne (GBR)	01
Nino Loladze (GEO)	02

Round of 16
Nora Gjakova (KOS)	10 (yellow card)
Arleta Podolak (POL)	00
Pauline Starke (GER)	10
Nino Loladze (GEO)	00

Quarter-finals
Nora Gjakova (KOS)	00 (yellow card)
Pauline Starke (GER)	01

=== Pool D ===
First round
Pihla Matikainen (FIN)	01
Pleuni Cornelisse (NED)	00
Telma Monteiro (POR)	00 (yellow card)
Daria Kurbonmamadova (AIN)	10 (yellow card)
Muna Dahouk (IRT)	00
Jaione Equisoain (ESP)	02

Round of 16
Timna Nelson-Levy (ISR)	02
Pihla Matikainen (FIN)	00 (yellow card)
Daria Kurbonmamadova (AIN)	10 (yellow card)
Jaione Equisoain (ESP)	00

Quarter-finals
Timna Nelson-Levy (ISR)	00 (yellow card)
Daria Kurbonmamadova (AIN)	11
