= 2024 European Judo Championships – Women's 57 kg =

Judo competition

Judo Women's 57 kg at the 2024 European Judo Championships
- Venue: Arena Zagreb
- Location: Zagreb, Croatia
- Date: 25 April
- Competitors: 34 from 25 nations

Medalists
gold medal	Daria Bilodid (1st title)	Ukraine
silver medal	Kaja Kajzer	Slovenia
bronze medal	Eteri Liparteliani	Georgia
bronze medal	Timna Nelson-Levy	Israel

Competition at external databases
- Links: IJF • JudoInside

The women's 57 kg competition at the 2024 European Judo Championships was held on 25 April at the Arena Zagreb.

== Results ==
=== Finals ===
Semi-finals
Eteri Liparteliani (GEO)	00
Daria Bilodid (UKR)	01
Kaja Kajzer (SLO)	11
Pauline Starke (GER)	01

Final
Daria Bilodid (UKR)	10
Kaja Kajzer (SLO)	00

=== Repechage ===
Repechage
Seija Ballhaus (GER)	00
Timna Nelson-Levy (ISR)	10
Marica Perišić (SRB)	10
Telma Monteiro (POR)	00

Bronze medal
Timna Nelson-Levy (ISR)	01
Pauline Starke (GER)	00 (yellow card)
Marica Perišić (SRB)	00
Eteri Liparteliani (GEO)	10

=== Pool A ===
First round
Ivelina Ilieva (BUL)	11
Hasret Bozkurt (TUR)	00

Round of 32
Eteri Liparteliani (GEO)	01
Thauany Capanni Dias (ITA)	00
Kseniia Galitskaia (AIN)	00
Faïza Mokdar (FRA)	10
Seija Ballhaus (GER)	01 (yellow card)
Ivelina Ilieva (BUL)	00 (yellow card)
Pleuni Cornelisse (NED)	10
Muna Dahouk (IRT)	00

Round of 16
Eteri Liparteliani (GEO)	01
Faïza Mokdar (FRA)	00 (yellow card)
Seija Ballhaus (GER)	10 (yellow card)
Pleuni Cornelisse (NED)	00 (yellow card)

Quarter-finals
Eteri Liparteliani (GEO)	11 (yellow card)
Seija Ballhaus (GER)	00 (yellow card)

=== Pool B ===
First round

Round of 32
Timna Nelson-Levy (ISR)	10
Arleta Podolak (POL)	00
Jaione Equisoain (ESP)	00
Lisa Grabner (AUT)	10
Daria Bilodid (UKR)	10 (yellow card)
Pihla Salonen (FIN)	00 (yellow card)
Acelya Toprak (AZE)	02
Carla Tavares Fernandes (LUX)	00

Round of 16
Timna Nelson-Levy (ISR)	10 (yellow card)
Lisa Grabner (AUT)	00
Daria Bilodid (UKR)	11
Acelya Toprak (AZE)	00

Quarter-finals
Timna Nelson-Levy (ISR)	00
Daria Bilodid (UKR)	01

=== Pool C ===
First round

Round of 32
Marica Perišić (SRB)	10
Özlem Yıldız (TUR)	00 (yellow card)
Tihea Topolovec (CRO)	10
Flaka Loxha (KOS)	00
Kaja Kajzer (SLO)	02
Snezhana Gramatikova (BUL)	00
Thailien Castillo-Garcia (ROU)	01
Laura Kallinger (AUT)	10

Round of 16
Marica Perišić (SRB)	01 (yellow card)
Tihea Topolovec (CRO)	00
Kaja Kajzer (SLO)	10
Laura Kallinger (AUT)	00

Quarter-finals
Marica Perišić (SRB)	00 (yellow card)
Kaja Kajzer (SLO)	01

=== Pool D ===
First round
Julie Beurskens (NED)	02
Anastasiia Chyzhevska (UKR)	00

Round of 32
Pauline Starke (GER)	10
Julie Beurskens (NED)	00 (yellow card)
Marta García (ESP)	01 (yellow card)
Nino Loladze (GEO)	00
Priscilla Gneto (FRA)	10
Mina Libeer (BEL)	00
Lele Nairne (GBR)	00
Telma Monteiro (POR)	01

Round of 16
Pauline Starke (GER)	10
Marta García (ESP)	00 (yellow card)
Priscilla Gneto (FRA)	00 (yellow card)
Telma Monteiro (POR)	01

Quarter-finals
Pauline Starke (GER)	10
Telma Monteiro (POR)	00
