= 2021 European Judo Championships – Women's 57 kg =

Judo Women's 57 kg at the 2021 European Judo Championships
- Venue: Altice Arena
- Location: Lisbon, Portugal
- Date: 16 April
- Competitors: 28 from 20 nations

Medalists
gold medal	Telma Monteiro (4th title)	Portugal
silver medal	Kaja Kajzer	Slovenia
bronze medal	Sarah-Léonie Cysique	France
bronze medal	Nora Gjakova	Kosovo

Competition at external databases
- Links: IJF • JudoInside

The women's 57 kg competition at the 2021 European Judo Championships was held on 16 April at the Altice Arena.

== Results ==
=== Final ===
Final
Telma Monteiro (POR)	10
Kaja Kajzer (SLO)	00

=== Repechage ===
Repechage
Daria Mezhetskaia (RUS)	00
Mina Libeer (BEL)	11

Third place
Mina Libeer (BEL)	00
Sarah-Léonie Cysique (FRA)	01

Repechage
Eteri Liparteliani (GEO)	10
Timna Nelson-Levy (ISR)	01

Third place
Eteri Liparteliani (GEO)	00
Nora Gjakova (KOS)	11

=== Top half ===
Round of 32
Loredana Ohâi (ROU)	00
Carla Ubasart (ESP)	01
Daria Mezhetskaia (RUS)	01
Sanne Verhagen (NED)	00
Silvia Pellitteri (ITA)	10
Alina Shylova (UKR)	00
Pauline Starke (GER)	00
Sabrina Filzmoser (AUT)	01
Julia Kowalczyk (POL)	00
Věra Zemanová (CZE)	01
Marica Perišić (SRB)	00
Mina Libeer (BEL)	01

Round of 16
Nora Gjakova (KOS)	10
Carla Ubasart (ESP)	00
Daria Mezhetskaia (RUS)	10
Silvia Pellitteri (ITA)	00
Telma Monteiro (POR)	01
Sabrina Filzmoser (AUT)	00
Věra Zemanová (CZE)	00
Mina Libeer (BEL)	10

Quarterfinals
Nora Gjakova (KOS)	10
Daria Mezhetskaia (RUS)	00
Telma Monteiro (POR)	10
Mina Libeer (BEL)	00

Semifinals
Nora Gjakova (KOS)	00
Telma Monteiro (POR)	10

=== Bottom half ===
Round of 32
Wilsa Gomes (POR)	10
Viktória Majorošová (SVK)	00
Eteri Liparteliani (GEO)	10
Mariia Skora (UKR)	01
Anastasia Konkina (RUS)	00
Jana Ziegler (GER)	10
Jovana Rogić (SRB)	10
Veronica Toniolo (ITA)	00
Kaja Kajzer (SLO)	01
Flaka Loxha (KOS)	00
Andrea Kármán (HUN)	00
Anna Kuczera (POL)	10

Round of 16
Sarah-Léonie Cysique (FRA)	11
Wilsa Gomes (POR)	00
Eteri Liparteliani (GEO)	10
Jana Ziegler (GER)	01
Timna Nelson-Levy (ISR)	10
Jovana Rogić (SRB)	00
Kaja Kajzer (SLO)	01
Anna Kuczera (POL)	00

Quarterfinals
Sarah-Léonie Cysique (FRA)	10
Eteri Liparteliani (GEO)	00
Timna Nelson-Levy (ISR)	00
Kaja Kajzer (SLO)	01

Semifinals
Sarah-Léonie Cysique (FRA)	00
Kaja Kajzer (SLO)	01
