= 2020 European Judo Championships – Women's 57 kg =

Judo competition

Judo Women's 57 kg at the 2020 European Judo Championships
- Venue: O2 Arena
- Location: Prague, Czech Republic
- Date: 19 November
- Competitors: 24 from 20 nations

Medalists
gold medal	Hedvig Karakas (1st title)	Hungary
silver medal	Telma Monteiro	Portugal
bronze medal	Sarah-Léonie Cysique	France
bronze medal	Theresa Stoll	Germany

Competition at external databases
- Links: IJF • JudoInside

The women's 57 kg competition at the 2020 European Judo Championships was held on 19 November at the O2 Arena.

== Results ==
=== Final ===
Final
Telma Monteiro (POR)	00
Hedvig Karakas (HUN)	10

=== Repechage ===
Repechage
Sarah-Léonie Cysique (FRA)	10
Julia Kowalczyk (POL)	00

Third place
Sarah-Léonie Cysique (FRA)	10
Ivelina Ilieva (BUL)	00

Repechage
Theresa Stoll (GER)	11
Daria Mezhetskaia (RUS)	00

Third place
Theresa Stoll (GER)	01
Marica Perišić (SRB)	00

=== Top half ===
Round of 32
Anastasia Konkina (RUS)	10
Sabrina Filzmoser (AUT)	00
Mina Libeer (BEL)	00
Marica Perišić (SRB)	01
Alexandra Larisa Florian (AZE)	00
Sanne Verhagen (NED)	10
Flaka Loxha (KOS)	01
Mariia Skora (UKR)	00

Round of 16
Sarah-Léonie Cysique (FRA)	10
Anastasia Konkina (RUS)	00
Kaja Kajzer (SLO)	00
Marica Perišić (SRB)	10
Telma Monteiro (POR)	10
Sanne Verhagen (NED)	00
Julia Kowalczyk (POL)	01
Flaka Loxha (KOS)	00

Quarterfinals
Sarah-Léonie Cysique (FRA)	00
Marica Perišić (SRB)	01
Telma Monteiro (POR)	10
Julia Kowalczyk (POL)	00

Semifinals
Marica Perišić (SRB)	00
Telma Monteiro (POR)	10

=== Bottom half ===
Round of 32
Jovana Rogić (SRB)	10
Silvia Pellitteri (ITA)	00
Eteri Liparteliani (GEO)	00
Věra Zemanová (CZE)	01
Anna Kuczera (POL)	11
Viktória Majorošová (SVK)	00
Ulyana Minenkova (BLR)	00
Wilsa Gomes (POR)	01

Round of 16
Theresa Stoll (GER)	10
Jovana Rogić (SRB)	00
Ivelina Ilieva (BUL)	10
Věra Zemanová (CZE)	00
Hedvig Karakas (HUN)	01
Anna Kuczera (POL)	00
Daria Mezhetskaia (RUS)	01
Wilsa Gomes (POR)	00

Quarterfinals
Theresa Stoll (GER)	00
Ivelina Ilieva (BUL)	10
Hedvig Karakas (HUN)	10
Daria Mezhetskaia (RUS)	00

Semifinals
Ivelina Ilieva (BUL)	00
Hedvig Karakas (HUN)	01
