= Kosovo at the 2020 Summer Olympics =

- IOC code: KOS
- NOC: Olympic Committee of Kosovo
- Website: noc-kosovo.org (in Albanian and Serbian)

in Tokyo, Japan 23 July 2021 – 8 August 2021
- Competitors: 11 in 6 sports
- Flag bearers (opening): Majlinda Kelmendi; Akil Gjakova
- Flag bearer (closing): Egzon Shala
- Medals Ranked 42nd: Gold 2 Silver 0 Bronze 0 Total 2

Summer Olympics appearances (overview)
- 2016; 2020; 2024

Other related appearances
- Yugoslavia (1920–1992W); Independent Olympic Participants (1992S); Serbia and Montenegro (1996–2006); Serbia (2008–2012)

Kosovo (KOS) competed at the 2020 Summer Olympics in Tokyo, Japan, represented by the Olympic Committee of Kosovo (KOK/OKK). The nation had previously participated in the Summer Olympic Games on one occasion in 2016. A total of 11 athletes, five men and six women, were selected by the national committee to compete in six sports. Initially scheduled to take place during the summer of 2020, the games were postponed to 23 July to 8 August 2021 in relation to the pandemic of the coronavirus disease 2019 (COVID-19).

Kosovo won two gold medals, a further improvement on its 2016 performance where the country won one gold medal. Kosovo remains the only country to win more than two medals, all of which are gold. The gold medals were won by two female Judokas.

Distria Krasniqi who won Gold in the Women's 48 kg event and by Nora Gjakova who won Gold in the Women's 57 kg event. Majlinda Kelmendi, the gold medalist from the 2016 Summer Olympics, represented Kosovo for the second time in the Women's 52 kg category.

== Background ==
Following the 127th IOC Session in 2014, Kosovo was announced as an official member of the International Olympic Committee (IOC) and coincidentally obtained the right to participate as an independent nation in international sports events. Therefore, Kosovo made its Olympic debut as a member state at the 2016 Summer Olympics in Rio de Janeiro, Brazil. Marking the nation's second Summer Olympic participation, the 2020 Summer Olympics were originally scheduled to take place from 24 July to 9 August 2020 but were postponed to 2021 as a result of the COVID-19 pandemic.

== Competitors ==
The following table lists the number of competitors for Kosovo in the 2020 Summer Olympics. The nation's team for the 2020 games was composed of five male and six female competitors, including athlete Musa Hajdari, boxer Donjeta Sadiku, judoka Akil Gjakova, Distria Krasniqi, Majlinda Kelmendi, Nora Gjakova and Loriana Kuka, shooter Drilon Ibrahimi, swimmers Eda Zeqiri and Olt Kondirolli as well as wrestler Egzon Shala.

| Sport | Men | Women | Total |
|---|---|---|---|
| Athletics | 1 | 0 | 1 |
| Boxing | 0 | 1 | 1 |
| Judo | 1 | 4 | 5 |
| Shooting | 1 | 0 | 1 |
| Swimming | 1 | 1 | 2 |
| Wrestling | 1 | 0 | 1 |
| Total | 5 | 6 | 11 |

== Medalists ==
| Medal | Name | Sport | Event | Date |
|---|---|---|---|---|
| Gold | Distria Krasniqi | Judo | Women's 48 kg | 24 July |
| Gold | Nora Gjakova | Judo | Women's 57 kg | 26 July |

== Athletics ==
Kosovo received a universality slot from the IAAF to send a male track and field athlete to the Olympics.

Key

- Note–Ranks given for track events are within the athlete's heat only
- Q = Qualified for the next round
- q = Qualified for the next round as a fastest loser or, in field events, by position without achieving the qualifying target
- NR = National record
- N/A = Round not applicable for the event
- Bye = Athlete not required to compete in round

Track & road events

| Athlete | Event | Heat | | Semifinal | | Final | |
| Athlete | Event | Result | Rank | Result | Rank | Result | Rank |
|---|---|---|---|---|---|---|---|
| Musa Hajdari | Men's 800 m | 1:48.96 | 8 | Did not advance | | | |

== Boxing ==
Kosovo entered one female boxer into the Olympic tournament after receiving the tripartite invitation quotas.

| Athlete | Event | Round of 32 | Round of 16 | Quarterfinals | Semifinals | Final | |
| Athlete | Event | Opposition Result | Opposition Result | Opposition Result | Opposition Result | Opposition Result | Rank |
|---|---|---|---|---|---|---|---|
| Donjeta Sadiku | Women's lightweight | Dubois (GBR); L 0–5 | Did not advance | | | | |

== Judo ==
Kosovo entered five judoka (one men and four women) into the Olympic tournament based on the International Judo Federation Olympics Individual Ranking.

| Athlete | Event | Round of 64 | Round of 32 | Round of 16 | Quarterfinals | Semifinals | Repechage | Final / BM | |
| Athlete | Event | Opposition Result | Opposition Result | Opposition Result | Opposition Result | Opposition Result | Opposition Result | Opposition Result | Rank |
|---|---|---|---|---|---|---|---|---|---|
| Akil Gjakova | Men's −73 kg | Ayash (YEM); W 10–00 | Stump (SUI); W 11–00 | Macias (SWE); W 10–00 | Tsend-Ochir (MGL); L 00–10 | Did not advance | Orujov (AZE); L 00–10 | Did not advance | 7 |
| Distria Krasniqi | Women's –48 kg | —N/a | Bye | Chibana (BRA); W 10–00 | Lin C-h (TPE); W 10–00 | Mönkhbat (MGL); W 10–00 | Bye | Tonaki (JPN); W 10–00 | 1st place, gold medalist(s) |
| Majlinda Kelmendi | Women's –52 kg | —N/a | Pupp (HUN); L 00–10 | Did not advance | | | | | |
| Nora Gjakova | Women's –57 kg | —N/a | Bye | Verhagen (NED); W 01–00 | Kajzer (SLO); W 11–00 | Yoshida (JPN); W 10–00 | Bye | Cysique (FRA); W 10–00 | 1st place, gold medalist(s) |
| Loriana Kuka | Women's –78 kg | —N/a | Bye | Babintseva (ROC); L 00–10 | Did not advance | | | | |

== Shooting ==
Kosovo received an invitation from the Tripartite Commission to send a men's rifle shooter to the Olympics, as long as the minimum qualifying score (MQS) was met.

| Athlete | Event | Qualification | | Final | |
| Athlete | Event | Points | Rank | Points | Rank |
|---|---|---|---|---|---|
| Drilon Ibrahimi | Men's 10 m air rifle | 608.8 | 46 | Did not advance | |

== Swimming ==
Kosovo received a universality invitation from FINA to send two top-ranked swimmers (one per gender) in their respective individual events to the Olympics, based on the FINA Points System of June 28, 2021.

| Athlete | Event | Heat | | Semifinal | | Final | |
| Athlete | Event | Time | Rank | Time | Rank | Time | Rank |
|---|---|---|---|---|---|---|---|
| Olt Kondirolli | Men's 100 m freestyle | 54.33 | 64 | Did not advance | | | |
| Eda Zeqiri | Women's 400 m freestyle | 4:38.02 | 24 | —N/a | | Did not advance | |

== Wrestling ==
Kosovo qualified one wrestler for the men's freestyle 125 kg, by acknowledging a license from the United World Wrestling, following the disqualification of two wrestlers for anti-doping rules violations. Moreover, these Games marked the country's debut in the sport.

Key:

- VT (ranking points: 5–0 or 0–5) – Victory by fall.
- VB (ranking points: 5–0 or 0–5) – Victory by injury (VF for forfeit, VA for withdrawal or disqualification)
- PP (ranking points: 3–1 or 1–3) – Decision by points – the loser with technical points.
- PO (ranking points: 3–0 or 0–3) – Decision by points – the loser without technical points.
- ST (ranking points: 4–0 or 0–4) – Great superiority – the loser without technical points and a margin of victory of at least 8 (Greco-Roman) or 10 (freestyle) points.
- SP (ranking points: 4–1 or 1–4) – Technical superiority – the loser with technical points and a margin of victory of at least 8 (Greco-Roman) or 10 (freestyle) points.

Freestyle

| Athlete | Event | Round of 16 | Quarterfinal | Semifinal | Repechage | Final / BM | |
| Athlete | Event | Opposition Result | Opposition Result | Opposition Result | Opposition Result | Opposition Result | Rank |
|---|---|---|---|---|---|---|---|
| Egzon Shala | Men's −125 kg | Berrahal (ALG); W 5−0 ^{VT} | Zare (IRI); L 1–4 ^{SP} | Did not advance | | | 7 |
