= 2026 European Judo Championships – Women's 57 kg =

Judo competition

Judo Women's 57 kg at the 2026 European Judo Championships
- Venue: Olympic Palace
- Location: Tbilisi, Georgia
- Date: 17 April 2026
- Competitors: 33 from 25 nations

Medalists
gold medal	Eteri Liparteliani (1st title)	Georgia
silver medal	Timna Nelson-Levy	Israel
bronze medal	Binta Ndiaye	Switzerland
bronze medal	Sarah-Léonie Cysique	France

Competition at external databases
- Links: IJF • JudoInside

The women's 57 kg event at the 2026 European Judo Championships was held at the Olympic Palace in Tbilisi, Georgia on 17 April 2026.

== Results ==
=== Finals ===
Semi-finals
(Georgia (country)) Eteri Liparteliani	100 (yellow card)
(Serbia) Marica Perišić	000
(United Kingdom) Acelya Toprak	001 (yellow card)
(Israel) Timna Nelson-Levy	002 (yellow card)

Final
(Georgia (country)) Eteri Liparteliani	100 (yellow card)
(Israel) Timna Nelson-Levy	001

=== Repechage ===
Repechage
(Russia) Kseniia Galitskaia	000
(Switzerland) Binta Ndiaye	100
(France) Sarah-Léonie Cysique	021
(France) Martha Fawaz	000 (yellow card)

Bronze medal
(Switzerland) Binta Ndiaye	101
(United Kingdom) Acelya Toprak	001
(France) Sarah-Léonie Cysique	020 (yellow card)
(Serbia) Marica Perišić	001 (yellow card)

=== Pool A ===
First round

Round of 32
(Georgia (country)) Eteri Liparteliani	004
(Norway) Elise Bjørås	000 (yellow card)
(Italy) Veronica Toniolo	001
(Turkey) Ayşenur Budak	000 (yellow card)
(Finland) Pihla Salonen	000
(Russia) Kseniia Galitskaia	100
(Spain) Marta García	001
(Liechtenstein) Lea Wyss	000

Round of 16
(Georgia (country)) Eteri Liparteliani	001
(Italy) Veronica Toniolo	000
(Russia) Kseniia Galitskaia	101
(Spain) Marta García	000

Quarter-finals
(Georgia (country)) Eteri Liparteliani	010
(Russia) Kseniia Galitskaia	000

=== Pool B ===
First round
~~(Cyprus) Marina Azinou~~
(Netherlands) Julie Beurskens	w/o

Round of 32
(Croatia) Ana Viktorija Puljiz	100 (yellow card)
(Belgium) Mina Libeer	000
(Lithuania) Varvara Kuchar	000 (yellow card)
(Switzerland) Binta Ndiaye	100
(Serbia) Marica Perišić	001
(Netherlands) Julie Beurskens	000 (yellow card)
(Israel) Inbal Shemesh	000
(Slovenia) Nika Tomc	100

Round of 16
(Croatia) Ana Viktorija Puljiz	000
(Switzerland) Binta Ndiaye	100
(Serbia) Marica Perišić	010 (yellow card)
(Slovenia) Nika Tomc	000

Quarter-finals
(Switzerland) Binta Ndiaye	000
(Serbia) Marica Perišić	001 (yellow card)

=== Pool C ===
First round

Round of 32
(France) Sarah-Léonie Cysique	100
(Albania) Erisa Brahimaj	000
(Latvia) Anastasija Sokirjanska	101
(Estonia) Merit Tarkus	000
(United Kingdom) Acelya Toprak	100
(Russia) Irina Zueva	000
(Slovenia) Jevgenija Gajić	002 (yellow card)
(Croatia) Dora Bortas	000

Round of 16
(France) Sarah-Léonie Cysique	100
(Latvia) Anastasija Sokirjanska	000
(United Kingdom) Acelya Toprak	002
(Slovenia) Jevgenija Gajić	000

Quarter-finals
(France) Sarah-Léonie Cysique	000
(United Kingdom) Acelya Toprak	001

=== Pool D ===
First round

Round of 32
(Israel) Timna Nelson-Levy	101 (yellow card)
(Georgia (country)) Nino Loladze	000 (yellow card)
(Finland) Pihla Matikainen	010
(Turkey) Hasret Bozkurt	000
(France) Martha Fawaz	101
(Bosnia and Herzegovina) Anđela Samardžić	000
(Moldova) Daniela Tcaci	000
(Bulgaria) Snezhana Gramatikova	103

Round of 16
(Israel) Timna Nelson-Levy	100 (yellow card)
(Finland) Pihla Matikainen	000 (yellow card)
(France) Martha Fawaz	011
(Bulgaria) Snezhana Gramatikova	000 (yellow card)

Quarter-finals
(Israel) Timna Nelson-Levy	100
(France) Martha Fawaz	001 (yellow card)
