= 2022 European Judo Championships – Women's 57 kg =

Judo competition

Judo Women's 57 kg at the 2022 European Judo Championships
- Venue: Armeets Arena
- Location: Sofia, Bulgaria
- Date: 29 April
- Competitors: 24 from 20 nations

Medalists
gold medal	Timna Nelson-Levy (1st title)	Israel
silver medal	Sarah-Léonie Cysique	France
bronze medal	Mina Libeer	Belgium
bronze medal	Eteri Liparteliani	Georgia

Competition at external databases
- Links: IJF • JudoInside

The women's 57 kg competition at the 2022 European Judo Championships was held on 29 April at the Armeets Arena.

== Results ==
=== Finals ===
Semi-finals
Sarah-Léonie Cysique (FRA)	10
Eteri Liparteliani (GEO)	00
Pauline Starke (GER)	00
Timna Nelson-Levy (ISR)	01

Final
Sarah-Léonie Cysique (FRA)	00
Timna Nelson-Levy (ISR)	01

=== Repechage ===
Repechage
Mina Libeer (BEL)	11
Priscilla Gneto (FRA)	01
Flaka Loxha (KOS)	00
Věra Zemanová (CZE)	01

Bronze medal
Mina Libeer (BEL)	10
Pauline Starke (GER)	00
Věra Zemanová (CZE)	00
Eteri Liparteliani (GEO)	10

=== Pool A ===
First round
Pauline Starke (GER)	00
Anđela Samardžić (BIH)	10
Lisa Grabner (AUT)	00
Ivelina Ilieva (BUL)	10

Round of 16
Sarah-Léonie Cysique (FRA)	10
Anđela Samardžić (BIH)	00
Mina Libeer (BEL)	01
Ivelina Ilieva (BUL)	00

Quarterfinals
Sarah-Léonie Cysique (FRA)	01
Mina Libeer (BEL)	00

=== Pool B ===
First round
Arleta Podolak (POL)	10
Acelya Toprak (GBR)	00
Daria Bilodid (UKR)	10
Pleuni Cornelisse (NED)	00

Round of 16
Eteri Liparteliani (GEO)	01
Arleta Podolak (POL)	00
Priscilla Gneto (FRA)	01
Daria Bilodid (UKR)	00

Quarterfinals
Eteri Liparteliani (GEO)	10
Priscilla Gneto (FRA)	01

=== Pool C ===
First round
Pauline Starke (GER)	10
Hasret Bozkurt (TUR)	00
Snezhana Gramatikova (BUL)	00
Flaka Loxha (KOS)	10

Round of 16
Telma Monteiro (POR)	00
Pauline Starke (GER)	10
Julia Kowalczyk (POL)	01
Flaka Loxha (KOS)	10

Quarterfinals
Pauline Starke (GER)	10
Flaka Loxha (KOS)	00

=== Pool D ===
First round
Tihea Topolovec (CRO)	10
Kitti Kovács (HUN)	00
Věra Zemanová (CZE)	10
Jaione Equisoain (ESP)	00

Round of 16
Timna Nelson-Levy (ISR)	10
Tihea Topolovec (CRO)	00
Marica Perišić (SRB)	00
Věra Zemanová (CZE)	10

Quarterfinals
Timna Nelson-Levy (ISR)	10
Věra Zemanová (CZE)	00
