= 2026 World Judo Championships – Women's 57 kg =

Judo competition

Judo Women's 57 kg at the 2026 World Judo Championships
- Venue: National Gymnastics Arena
- Location: Baku, Azerbaijan
- Date: 6 October 2026
- Competitors: 42 from 34 nations
- Total prize money: €57,000

Medalists
gold medal	Akari Omori (1st title)	Japan
silver medal	Eteri Liparteliani	Georgia
bronze medal	Ana Viktorija Puljiz	Croatia
bronze medal	Marica Perišić	Serbia

Competition at external databases
- Links: IJF • JudoInside

The women's 57 kg event at the 2026 World Judo Championships was held at the National Gymnastics Arena in Baku, Azerbaijan on 6 October 2026.

== Results ==
=== Finals ===
Semi-finals
(Georgia (country)) Eteri Liparteliani	001 (yellow card)
(Germany) Seija Ballhaus	000 (yellow card)
(France) Sarah-Léonie Cysique	000
(Japan) Akari Omori	100

Final
(Georgia (country)) Eteri Liparteliani	000 (yellow card)
(Japan) Akari Omori	001

=== Repechage ===
Repechage
(Croatia) Ana Viktorija Puljiz	111
(China) Wang Nan	000
(Serbia) Marica Perišić	100 (yellow card)
(Japan) Momo Tamaoki	000

Bronze medal
(Croatia) Ana Viktorija Puljiz	w/o
(France) Sarah-Léonie Cysique	0
(Serbia) Marica Perišić	001
(Germany) Seija Ballhaus	000

=== Pool A ===
First round
(Switzerland) Binta Ndiaye	000 (yellow card)
(Brazil) Sarah Souza	100
(Russia) Irina Zueva	100
(Turkey) Ayşenur Budak	000

Round of 32
(Georgia (country)) Eteri Liparteliani	101
(Uruguay) Maya Leopold	000
(Brazil) Sarah Souza	100 (yellow card)
(Colombia) María Villalba	000
(Croatia) Ana Viktorija Puljiz	100 (yellow card)
(Russia) Irina Zueva	000
(India) Yamini Mourya	001
(Italy) Giulia Carnà	100

Round of 16
(Georgia (country)) Eteri Liparteliani	100 (yellow card)
(Brazil) Sarah Souza	000
(Croatia) Ana Viktorija Puljiz	100
(Italy) Giulia Carnà	000

Quarter-finals
(Georgia (country)) Eteri Liparteliani	100
(Croatia) Ana Viktorija Puljiz	000

=== Pool B ===
First round
(Finland) Pihla Salonen	010 (yellow card)
(Mongolia) Terbishiin Ariunzayaa	000 (yellow card)
Habiba Bayati	000
(Latvia) Anastasija Sokirjanska	100
(Netherlands) Shannon van de Meeberg	000
(Spain) Marta García	100 (yellow card)

Round of 32
(Israel) Timna Nelson-Levy	002 (yellow card)
(Finland) Pihla Salonen	001
(Latvia) Anastasija Sokirjanska	000
(China) Wang Nan	001
(Germany) Seija Ballhaus	100
(Guinea) Mariana Esteves	000
(Spain) Marta García	021
(Hungary) Luca Vég	000 (yellow card)

Round of 16
(Israel) Timna Nelson-Levy	000
(China) Wang Nan	001
(Germany) Seija Ballhaus	101
(Spain) Marta García	000

Quarter-finals
(China) Wang Nan	000 (yellow card)
(Germany) Seija Ballhaus	100 (yellow card)

=== Pool C ===
First round
(Israel) Inbal Shemesh	000
(Finland) Pihla Matikainen	010 (yellow card)
(Russia) Olga Mukhina	010 (yellow card)
(Spain) Adriana Rodríguez Salvador	020 (yellow card)
(Cuba) Lian Benavides	000 (yellow card)
(United Arab Emirates) Oyunchimeg Oyungerel	102

Round of 32
(France) Sarah-Léonie Cysique	020
(Finland) Pihla Matikainen	000
(Turkmenistan) Maysa Pardayeva	100 (yellow card)
(South Korea) Kim Ju-hee	001
(Serbia) Marica Perišić	100
(Spain) Adriana Rodríguez Salvador	010 (yellow card)
(United Arab Emirates) Oyunchimeg Oyungerel	020
(Lithuania) Varvara Kuchar	000 (yellow card)

Round of 16
(France) Sarah-Léonie Cysique	010 (yellow card)
(Turkmenistan) Maysa Pardayeva	000
(Serbia) Marica Perišić	010 (yellow card)
(United Arab Emirates) Oyunchimeg Oyungerel	000

Quarter-finals
(France) Sarah-Léonie Cysique	100 (yellow card)
(Serbia) Marica Perišić	000 (yellow card)

=== Pool D ===
First round
(United States) Mariah Holguin	000
(United Kingdom) Acelya Toprak	100 (yellow card)
(Brazil) Jéssica Lima	020 (yellow card)
(Mongolia) Lkhagvasürengiin Sosorbaram	000 (yellow card)

Round of 32
(Japan) Momo Tamaoki	010
(United Kingdom) Acelya Toprak	000
(Kyrgyzstan) Zhanar Zholdosheva	001
(Azerbaijan) Khadizha Gadashova	000 (yellow card)
(Japan) Akari Omori	100 (yellow card)
(Georgia (country)) Nino Loladze	000 (yellow card)
(Brazil) Jéssica Lima	000
(Belgium) Mina Libeer	001 (yellow card)

Round of 16
(Japan) Momo Tamaoki	101
(Kyrgyzstan) Zhanar Zholdosheva	001
(Japan) Akari Omori	001 (yellow card)
(Belgium) Mina Libeer	000 (yellow card)

Quarter-finals
(Japan) Momo Tamaoki	001 (yellow card)
(Japan) Akari Omori	010 (yellow card)

== Prize money ==
The sums listed bring the total prizes awarded to €57,000 for the individual event.

Medal	Total	Judoka	Coach
Gold	€26,000	€20,800	€5,200
Silver	€15,000	€12,000	€3,000
Bronze	€8,000	€6,400	€1,600
