= 2025 European Judo Championships – Women's 57 kg =

Judo competition

Judo Women's 57 kg at the 2025 European Judo Championships
- Venue: Morača Sports Center
- Location: Podgorica, Montenegro
- Date: 24 April 2025
- Competitors: 28 from 22 nations

Medalists
gold medal	Seija Ballhaus (1st title)	Germany
silver medal	Eteri Liparteliani	Georgia
bronze medal	Martha Fawaz	France
bronze medal	Veronica Toniolo	Italy

Competition at external databases
- Links: IJF • JudoInside

The women's 57 kg competition at the 2025 European Judo Championships was held at the Morača Sports Center in Podgorica, Montenegro on 24 April 2025.

== Results ==
=== Finals ===
Semi-finals
(Georgia (country)) Eteri Liparteliani	001
(Israel) Timna Nelson-Levy	000
(Serbia) Marica Perišić	000
(Germany) Seija Ballhaus	001

Final
(Georgia (country)) Eteri Liparteliani	000 (yellow card)
(Germany) Seija Ballhaus	010

=== Repechage ===
Repechage
(Switzerland) Binta Ndiaye	000
(France) Martha Fawaz	101
(International Judo Federation) Irina Zueva	000
(Italy) Veronica Toniolo	010 (yellow card)

Bronze medal
(France) Martha Fawaz	001 (yellow card)
(Serbia) Marica Perišić	000
(Italy) Veronica Toniolo	100
(Israel) Timna Nelson-Levy	000

=== Pool A ===
First round
(Spain) Marta García	000
(International Judo Federation) Daria Kurbonmamadova	001 (yellow card)
(Turkey) Hasret Bozkurt	000
(Switzerland) Binta Ndiaye	100
(Latvia) Anastasija Sokirjanska	000
(Azerbaijan) Fidan Alizada	101

Round of 16
(Georgia (country)) Eteri Liparteliani	001 (yellow card)
(International Judo Federation) Daria Kurbonmamadova	000 (yellow card)
(Switzerland) Binta Ndiaye	100 (yellow card)
(Azerbaijan) Fidan Alizada	011

Quarter-finals
(Georgia (country)) Eteri Liparteliani	100
(Switzerland) Binta Ndiaye	000

=== Pool B ===
First round
(Austria) Verena Hiden	000
(Serbia) Kristina Nišavić	001 (yellow card)
(France) Martha Fawaz	100
(Greece) Christina Papadopoulou	000
(Croatia) Ana Viktorija Puljiz	100
(Estonia) Merit Tarkus	000 (yellow card)

Round of 16
(Israel) Timna Nelson-Levy	100
(Serbia) Kristina Nišavić	000
(France) Martha Fawaz	020 (yellow card)
(Croatia) Ana Viktorija Puljiz	000

Quarter-finals
(Israel) Timna Nelson-Levy	100
(France) Martha Fawaz	000

=== Pool C ===
First round
(Bulgaria) Snezhana Gramatikova	000
(Georgia (country)) Nino Loladze	100
(International Judo Federation) Irina Zueva	022 (yellow card)
(Albania) Erisa Brahimaj	000 (yellow card)
(Croatia) Dora Bortas	000
(Poland) Karolina Siennicka	100 (yellow card)

Round of 16
(Serbia) Marica Perišić	001
(Georgia (country)) Nino Loladze	000 (yellow card)
(International Judo Federation) Irina Zueva	101 (yellow card)
(Poland) Karolina Siennicka	000 (yellow card)

Quarter-finals
(Serbia) Marica Perišić	100
(International Judo Federation) Irina Zueva	000

=== Pool D ===
First round
(Finland) Pihla Salonen	001 (yellow card)
(Spain) Malin Wilson	000
(Italy) Veronica Toniolo	001 (yellow card)
(Liechtenstein) Lea Wyss	000
(Austria) Laura Kallinger	000
(Hungary) Kitti Kovács	102

Round of 16
(Germany) Seija Ballhaus	002 (yellow card)
(Finland) Pihla Salonen	001 (yellow card)
(Italy) Veronica Toniolo	100
(Hungary) Kitti Kovács	000

Quarter-finals
(Germany) Seija Ballhaus	100
(Italy) Veronica Toniolo	001
