= 2025 World Judo Championships – Women's 57 kg =

Judo competition

Judo Women's 57 kg at the 2025 World Judo Championships
- Venue: László Papp Budapest Sports Arena
- Location: Budapest, Hungary
- Date: 15 June 2025
- Competitors: 35 from 29 nations
- Total prize money: €57,000

Medalists
gold medal	Eteri Liparteliani (1st title)	Georgia
silver medal	Momo Tamaoki	Japan
bronze medal	Shirlen Nascimento	Brazil
bronze medal	Sarah-Léonie Cysique	France

Competition at external databases
- Links: IJF • JudoInside

The 2025 World Judo Championships was held at the László Papp Budapest Sports Arena in Budapest, Hungary on 15 June 2025.

== Results ==
=== Finals ===
Semi-finals
(Japan) Momo Tamaoki	100
(France) Sarah-Léonie Cysique	000
(Turkmenistan) Maysa Pardayeva	001
(Georgia (country)) Eteri Liparteliani	100

Final
(Japan) Momo Tamaoki	000
(Georgia (country)) Eteri Liparteliani	020

=== Repechage ===
Repechage
(Brazil) Shirlen Nascimento	100 (yellow card)
(Serbia) Marica Perišić	000
(Uzbekistan) Shukurjon Aminova	001 (yellow card)
(Finland) Pihla Salonen	000 (yellow card)

Bronze medal
(Brazil) Shirlen Nascimento	010
(Turkmenistan) Maysa Pardayeva	000
(Uzbekistan) Shukurjon Aminova	000
(France) Sarah-Léonie Cysique	010

=== Pool A ===
First round
(Switzerland) Binta Ndiaye	100
(Georgia (country)) Nino Loladze	000 (yellow card)

Round of 32
(South Korea) Huh Mi-mi	000 (yellow card)
(Brazil) Shirlen Nascimento	010 (yellow card)
(Guinea) Mariana Esteves	000 (yellow card)
(Chinese Taipei) Yang Yu-chieh	100
(Japan) Momo Tamaoki	100 (yellow card)
(Switzerland) Binta Ndiaye	000
(Germany) Pauline Starke	101
(Latvia) Anastasija Sokirjanska	000

Round of 16
(Brazil) Shirlen Nascimento	010 (yellow card)
(Chinese Taipei) Yang Yu-chieh	000 (yellow card)
(Japan) Momo Tamaoki	100
(Germany) Pauline Starke	000

Quarter-finals
(Brazil) Shirlen Nascimento	000
(Japan) Momo Tamaoki	100

=== Pool B ===
First round

Round of 32
(France) Sarah-Léonie Cysique	001 (yellow card)
(Croatia) Ana Viktorija Puljiz	000
(Spain) Marta García	000 (yellow card)
(International Judo Federation) Irina Zueva	110 (yellow card)
(Serbia) Marica Perišić	001 (yellow card)
(Azerbaijan) Fidan Alizada	000
(Mongolia) Terbishiin Ariunzayaa	001
(Australia) Tinka Easton	000

Round of 16
(France) Sarah-Léonie Cysique	100
(International Judo Federation) Irina Zueva	000
(Serbia) Marica Perišić	001
(Mongolia) Terbishiin Ariunzayaa	000 (yellow card)

Quarter-finals
(France) Sarah-Léonie Cysique	100
(Serbia) Marica Perišić	000

=== Pool C ===
First round
(United Kingdom) Acelya Toprak	101
(Hong Kong) Yeung Nok Lam	000 (yellow card)

Round of 32
(Germany) Seija Ballhaus	100 (yellow card)
(United Kingdom) Acelya Toprak	000
(Spain) Malin Wilson	000 (yellow card)
(Turkmenistan) Maysa Pardayeva	010 (yellow card)
(France) Martha Fawaz	000
(Uzbekistan) Shukurjon Aminova	100 (yellow card)
(China) Tao Yuying	000
(Hungary) Kitti Kovács	010 (yellow card)

Round of 16
(Germany) Seija Ballhaus	000
(Turkmenistan) Maysa Pardayeva	100
(Uzbekistan) Shukurjon Aminova	100
(Hungary) Kitti Kovács	000

Quarter-finals
(Turkmenistan) Maysa Pardayeva	100 (yellow card)
(Uzbekistan) Shukurjon Aminova	000

=== Pool D ===
First round
(Dominican Republic) Ana Rosa García	000
(International Judo Federation) Daria Kurbonmamadova	010 (yellow card)

Round of 32
(Georgia (country)) Eteri Liparteliani	100
(South Korea) Kim Ju-hee	000 (yellow card)
(International Judo Federation) Daria Kurbonmamadova	110
(United States) Mariah Holguin	000
(Israel) Timna Nelson-Levy	000 (yellow card)
(Finland) Pihla Salonen	001
(Liechtenstein) Lea Wyss	001 (yellow card)
(Turkey) Hasret Bozkurt	011 (yellow card)

Round of 16
(Georgia (country)) Eteri Liparteliani	020
(International Judo Federation) Daria Kurbonmamadova	000
(Finland) Pihla Salonen	110
(Turkey) Hasret Bozkurt	010

Quarter-finals
(Georgia (country)) Eteri Liparteliani	020
(Finland) Pihla Salonen	000

== Prize money ==
The sums listed bring the total prizes awarded to €57,000 for the individual event.

Medal	Total	Judoka	Coach
Gold	€26,000	€20,800	€5,200
Silver	€15,000	€12,000	€3,000
Bronze	€8,000	€6,400	€1,600
