= Akari Omori =

Japanese judoka (born 2002)

Personal information
- Born: 3 September 2002 (age 24)
- Occupation: Judoka

Sport
- Country: Japan
- Sport: Judo
- Weight class: ‍–‍57 kg

Achievements and titles
- World Champ.: (gold) (2026)
- Asian Champ.: (bronze) (2024)
Medal record
Women's judo
Representing Japan
World Championships
Gold medal – first place	2026 Baku	‍–‍57 kg
Gold medal – first place	2026 Baku	Mixed team
Asian Championships
Bronze medal – third place	2024 Hong Kong	‍–‍57 kg
IJF Grand Slam
Gold medal – first place	2025 Tashkent	‍–‍57 kg
Gold medal – first place	2025 Tokyo	‍–‍57 kg
Gold medal – first place	2026 Ulaanbaatar	‍–‍57 kg
Silver medal – second place	2026 Paris	‍–‍57 kg
Bronze medal – third place	2022 Tokyo	‍–‍57 kg
IJF Grand Prix
Bronze medal – third place	2023 Zagreb	‍–‍57 kg
Bronze medal – third place	2023 Linz	‍–‍57 kg
World Juniors Championships
Silver medal – second place	2022 Guayaquil	‍–‍57 kg
World University Games
Gold medal – first place	2021 Chengdu	Women's team
Silver medal – second place	2021 Chengdu	‍–‍57 kg

Profile at external databases
- IJF: 66481
- JudoInside.com: 142430
- Updated on 11 October 2026

Akari Omori (大森朱莉, Omori Akari; born 3 September 2002) is a Japanese judoka. She won a gold medal at the 2026 World Judo Championships.

== Career ==
In February 2025, Omori competed at the 2025 Judo Grand Slam Tashkent and won her first career Judo Grand Slam gold medal in the –57 kg category. In December 2025, she competed at the 2025 Judo Grand Slam Tokyo and again won a gold medal in the –57 kg category.

In June 2026, she competed at the 2026 Judo Grand Slam Ulaanbaatar and won a gold medal in the –57 kg category. In October 2026, she made her World Judo Championships debut and advanced to the finals of the –57 kg category. During the final she defeated Eteri Liparteliani, the 2025 World Champion, to win a gold medal. She also helped Japan win a gold medal in the mixed team event. This was Japan's eighth gold medal in the event at the World Judo Championships and first since 2024.
