= Beurskens =

Beurskens is a surname. Notable people with the surname include:

- Carla Beurskens (born 1952), Dutch long-distance runner
- Julie Beurskens (born 2004), Dutch judoka
