= Hasret Bozkurt =

Turkish judoka (born 2001)

Personal information
- Born: 7 March 2001 (age 25) Bartın, Turkey
- Occupation: Judoka

Sport
- Country: Turkey
- Sport: Judo
- Weight class: ‍–‍57 kg
- Rank: Black belt

Achievements and titles
- World Champ.: 5th (2023)
- European Champ.: R32 (2022, 2023, 2025, 2026)
Medal record
Women's judo
Representing Turkey
European Championships
Bronze medal – third place	2021 Ufa	Mixed team
Bronze medal – third place	2022 Mulhouse	Mixed team
European U23 Championships
Silver medal – second place	2022 Sarajevo	‍–‍57 kg
World Juniors Championships
Bronze medal – third place	2021 Olbia	Mixed team
European Junior Championships
Silver medal – second place	2021 Luxembourg	Mixed team
European Cadet Championships
Gold medal – first place	2018 Sarajevo	‍–‍57 kg
European Youth Olympic Festival
Bronze medal – third place	2017 Győr	Mixed team
Islamic Solidarity Games
Gold medal – first place	2025 Riyadh	‍–‍57 kg
Bronze medal – third place	2025 Riyadh	Mixed team

Profile at external databases
- IJF: 30193
- JudoInside.com: 104229
- Updated on 18 April 2026

Hasret Bozkurt (born 7 March 2001) is a Turkish female judoka who competes in the lightweight (‍‍–‍57 kg) division and the mixed team event.

== Sport career ==
Bozkurt has been a member of Galatasaray Judo since October 2018.

=== 2018 ===
Bozkurt won the gold medal in the ‍–‍57 kg event at the Antalya Cadets European Cup 2018 in Turkey. At the 2018 Summer Youth Olympics in Nanjing, China, she placed fourth after losing the repechage bronze medal match in the 63 kg division. She also competed in the mixed team event. She captured the gold medal at the 2018 European Cadet Championships in Sarajevo, Bosnia and Herzegovina.

=== 2019 ===
In 2019, Bozkurt won the bronze medal with Galatasaray at the European Judo Club Championships - Golden League Women.

=== 2021 ===
Bozkurt won the gold medal with her club at the Champions League in Paris, France in 2021. She took the bronze medal in the mixed team event at the 2021 World Juniors Championships in Olbia, Italy. She won the bronze medal in the mixed team event at the 2021 European Mixed Team Championships in Ufa, Russia.

=== 2022 ===
At the Sarajevo European Open 2022 in Bosnia and Herzegovina, Bozkurt took the bronze medal. The same year at the same place, she won the silver medal, and the gold medal in the mixed team event at the 2022 European U23 Championships. She became bronze medalist at the 2022 European Mixed Team Championships in Mulhouse, France. She competed at the 2022 European Championships in Sofia, Bulgaria, and lost the first round match of the group.

=== 2023 ===
Bozkurt competed at the 2023 World Championships in Doha, Qatar. She was awarded the title "Ippon of the Year 2023" for her win against the Brazilian 2022 world champion Rafaela Silva. She lost the semifinals and the following bronze medal repechage match. She was part of the Turkish mixed team at the 2023 European Mixed Team Championships in Krynica-Zdrój, Poland. At the 2022 Mediterranean Games in Oran, Algeria, she lost the repechage bronze medal match.

=== 2024 ===
Bozkurt took part at the 2024 European Championships in Zagreb, Croata and lost the first round match. At the 2024 World Championships in Abu Dhabi, United Arab Emirates, she was eliminated in the round of 16.

=== 2025 ===
At the 2025 European Championships in Podgorica, Montenegro, Bozkurt did not advance from the first round match of the individual event. She was also part of the mixed team, which failed to win any medal. She was not able to advance to the quarterfinals at the 2025 World Championships in Budapest, Hungary. Bozkurt captured the gold medal in the -57 kg individual event and the bronze medal in the mixed team event at the 2025 Islamic Solidarity Games in Riyadh, Saudi Arabia.

== Personal life ==
A native of Bartın, northwestern Turkey, Hasret Bozkurt was born on 7 March 2001. After finishing the high school, she studied in the Faculty of Sports Science at Bartın University.
