= Judo at the 2024 Summer Olympics – Women's 57 kg =

Judo Women's 57 kg at the Games of the XXXIII Olympiad
- Venue: Grand Palais Éphémère
- Location: Paris, France
- Date: 29 July 2024
- Competitors: 28 from 28 nations
- Website: Official website

Medalists
gold medal	Christa Deguchi (1st title)	Canada
silver medal	Huh Mi-mi	South Korea
bronze medal	Haruka Funakubo	Japan
bronze medal	Sarah-Léonie Cysique	France

Competition at external databases
- Links: IJF • JudoInside

The Women's 57 kg event in Judo at the 2024 Summer Olympics was held at the Grand Palais Éphémère in Paris, France on 29 July 2024.

== Summary ==
This is the ninth appearance of the women's lightweight category.

Nora Gjakova lost to Lkhagvatogoogiin Enkhriilen in first round, Sarah-Léonie Cysique lost to eventual champion Christa Deguchi, later, Cysique won a bronze medal by beating Eteri Liparteliani, one of the bronze medalists, Tsukasa Yoshida did not qualify as she retired just fifteen days before the Olympic games begun, and Jessica Klimkait not chosen by the IOC.

== Results ==
=== Finals ===
Semi-finals
Christa Deguchi (CAN)	10
Sarah-Léonie Cysique (FRA)	00
Huh Mi-mi (KOR)	01
Rafaela Silva (BRA)	00

Final
Christa Deguchi (CAN)	10
Huh Mi-mi (KOR)	00

=== Repechage ===
Repechage
Marica Perišić (SRB)	00 (yellow card)
Haruka Funakubo (JPN)	10 (yellow card)
Lkhagvatogoogiin Enkhriilen (MGL)	00
Eteri Liparteliani (GEO)	10

Bronze medal
Haruka Funakubo (JPN)	10
Rafaela Silva (BRA)	00
Eteri Liparteliani (GEO)	00
Sarah-Léonie Cysique (FRA)	11 (yellow card)

=== Pool A ===
First round
Kristine Jiménez (PAN)	10
Muna Dahouk (EOR)	00
Marica Perišić (SRB)	10
Manita Shrestha Pradhan (NEP)	00
Mariama Koroma (SLE)	00
Lien Chen-ling (TPE)	10

Round of 16
Christa Deguchi (CAN)	10
Kristine Jiménez (PAN)	00
Marica Perišić (SRB)	01
Lien Chen-ling (TPE)	00 (yellow card)

Quarter-finals
Christa Deguchi (CAN)	01
Marica Perišić (SRB)	00 (yellow card)

=== Pool B ===
First round
Maria Escano (GUM)	00 (yellow card)
Mariana Esteves (GUI)	10
Haruka Funakubo (JPN)	01
Veronica Toniolo (ITA)	00
Nera Tiebwa (KIR)	00
Daria Bilodid (UKR)	10

Round of 16
Sarah-Léonie Cysique (FRA)	10
Mariana Esteves (GUI)	00 (yellow card)
Haruka Funakubo (JPN)	10 (yellow card)
Daria Bilodid (UKR)	00

Quarter-finals
Sarah-Léonie Cysique (FRA)	10
Haruka Funakubo (JPN)	00

=== Pool C ===
First round
Timna Nelson-Levy (ISR)	01
Kaja Kajzer (SLO)	00
Nora Gjakova (KOS)	00
Lkhagvatogoogiin Enkhriilen (MGL)	10
Julie Beurskens (NED)	01
Pauline Starke (GER)	11 (yellow card)

Round of 16
Huh Mi-mi (KOR)	10
Timna Nelson-Levy (ISR)	00
Lkhagvatogoogiin Enkhriilen (MGL)	11
Pauline Starke (GER)	01

Quarter-finals
Huh Mi-mi (KOR)	01 (yellow card)
Lkhagvatogoogiin Enkhriilen (MGL)	00

=== Pool D ===
First round
Maysa Pardayeva (TKM)	10
Cai Qi (CHN)	00 (yellow card)
Eteri Liparteliani (GEO)	10
Lele Nairne (GBR)	00 (yellow card)
Shukurjon Aminova (UZB)	10 (yellow card)
Zouleiha Dabonne (CIV)	00

Round of 16
Rafaela Silva (BRA)	10
Maysa Pardayeva (TKM)	00
Eteri Liparteliani (GEO)	01 (yellow card)
Shukurjon Aminova (UZB)	00

Quarter-finals
Rafaela Silva (BRA)	10
Eteri Liparteliani (GEO)	00 (yellow card)
