= Timna Nelson-Levy =

Israeli judoka (born 1994)

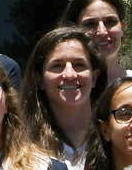
- Nelson-Levy in 2021

Personal information
- Native name: תמנע נלסון-לוי
- Nationality: Israeli
- Born: 7 July 1994 (age 32) Jerusalem, Israel
- Occupation: Judoka
- Height: 170 cm (5 ft 7 in)

Sport
- Country: Israel
- Sport: Judo
- Weight class: ‍–‍57 kg (115-pound)
- Rank: 5th dan black belt
- Coached by: Shany Hershko

Achievements and titles
- Olympic Games: 7th (2020)
- World Champ.: 5th (2022, 2024)
- European Champ.: (gold) (2022)
- Highest world ranking: 1^{st}
Medal record
Women's judo
Representing Israel
Olympic Games
Bronze medal – third place	2020 Tokyo	Mixed team
World Championships
Bronze medal – third place	2022 Tashkent	Mixed team
European Championships
Gold medal – first place	2022 Sofia	‍–‍57 kg
Silver medal – second place	2026 Tbilisi	‍–‍57 kg
Bronze medal – third place	2016 Kazan	‍–‍57 kg
Bronze medal – third place	2024 Zagreb	‍–‍57 kg
European Championships Open
Silver medal – second place	2023 Pristina	‍–‍57 kg
IJF Grand Slam
Gold medal – first place	2021 Tel Aviv	‍–‍57 kg
Gold medal – first place	2026 Tbilisi	‍–‍57 kg
Silver medal – second place	2025 Paris	‍–‍57 kg
Bronze medal – third place	2017 Baku	‍–‍57 kg
Bronze medal – third place	2018 Abu Dhabi	‍–‍57 kg
Bronze medal – third place	2020 Budapest	‍–‍57 kg
Bronze medal – third place	2022 Tel Aviv	‍–‍57 kg
Bronze medal – third place	2022 Antalya	‍–‍57 kg
Bronze medal – third place	2022 Ulaanbaatar	‍–‍57 kg
Bronze medal – third place	2022 Budapest	‍–‍57 kg
Bronze medal – third place	2023 Tel Aviv	‍–‍57 kg
Bronze medal – third place	2023 Baku	‍–‍57 kg
Bronze medal – third place	2025 Tashkent	‍–‍57 kg
IJF Grand Prix
Gold medal – first place	2018 Agadir	‍–‍57 kg
Gold medal – first place	2019 Tel Aviv	‍–‍57 kg
Silver medal – second place	2017 Antalya	‍–‍57 kg
Silver medal – second place	2017 Tashkent	‍–‍57 kg
Bronze medal – third place	2018 Tbilisi	‍–‍57 kg
Bronze medal – third place	2018 Cancún	‍–‍57 kg
Bronze medal – third place	2019 Marrakesh	‍–‍57 kg
Bronze medal – third place	2019 Montreal	‍–‍57 kg

Profile at external databases
- IJF: 14858
- JudoInside.com: 85093
- Updated on 18 April 2026

Timna Nelson-Levy (Hebrew: תמנע נלסון-לוי; born 7 July 1994) is an Israeli Olympic judoka. She competes in the under 57 kg weight category and represented Israel at the 2020 Summer Olympics, winning a bronze medal in the mixed team event. In European Championships, she won a gold medal in 2022 and bronze in 2016 and 2024. Nelson-Levy represented Israel at the 2024 Paris Olympics in judo in the women's 57 kg, coming in ninth, and in the mixed team event, at when Team Israel came in ninth.

== Early life ==
Nelson-Levy was born in Jerusalem, Israel, and is Jewish. She was named after the Timna Park just outside of Eilat, Israel, which her mother visited while pregnant with her. Her Zionist American parents Shmuel (a former boxer and now a stockbroker) and Laura (a former swimmer and now a tour guide) had immigrated to Israel in 1985 shortly after getting married, several years prior to her birth, and resided in Jerusalem. Before settling on judo at age 13, her first sports as a child were jujutsu and mixed martial arts; at 15 years of age she joined the Meitav Jerusalem Club. She studies for a B.A. at Ono Academic College in Israel.

== Judo career ==
=== 2014–16; European championships bronze medal ===
Nelson-Levy competed in the 2014 European Cup U21 Prague, and won a gold medal, and the European Cup U21 Thessaloniki, and won a bronze medal.

On 10 October 2015, Nelson-Levy won her first significant medal in a senior competition when she won a bronze medal at the European Open Lisbon in Portugal. She competed in the 2015 Belgian Ladies Open Arlon, and won a bronze medal.

On 21 April, she competed in the 2016 European championships for the first time, in Kazan, Russia, and won a bronze medal. Nelson-Levy defeated Anna Borowska of Poland in the first round, Hedvig Karakas of Hungary in the round of 16 and lost to Nora Gjakova of Kosovo in the quarter-finals. She went on to defeat Viola Wächter of Germany in the repechage and reached the bronze medal match where she defeated Hélène Receveaux of France by ippon. She competed as well in the 2016 European Open Sofia, in Bulgaria, and won a bronze medal.

=== 2017–21; Israeli Champion ===
Nelson-Levy competed in the 2017 Antalya Grand Prix in Turkey and the 2017 Tashkent Grand Prix in Uzbekistan, winning silver medals in both, and in the 2017 Baku Grand Slam, winning a bronze medal. She competed in the 2017 New York Open Team Championships and won a gold medal. She also competed in the Israeli Championships in Ra'anana, winning a gold medal.

Nelson-Levy competed in the 2018 Agadir Grand Prix, winning a gold medal. She also competed in the 2018 Tbilisi Grand Prix, the 2018 Cancún Grand Prix in Mexico and the 2018 Abu Dhabi Grand Slam, winning a bronze medal in each.

Nelson-Levy won a gold medal in the 2019 Tel Aviv Grand Prix in Israel. She also competed in the 2019 Marrakesh Grand Prix and the 2019 Montreal Grand Prix, winning bronze medals in each.

Nelson-Levy competed in the 2020 Budapest Grand Slam in Hungary, winning a bronze medal.

Nelson-Levy competed in the 2021 Tel Aviv Grand Slam in Israel, and won a gold medal.

=== 2020 Tokyo Olympics (in 2021); bronze medal ===
Nelson-Levy represented Israel at the 2020 Summer Olympics in Tokyo, Japan. Competing in the women's 57 kg weight category, Nelson-Levy stated at the round of 16, beating the Serbian 2020 European Junior Championships gold medalist Marica Perišić after a more than 10 minutes long match. In the quarter-finals, she lost to Japanese 2018 World champion Tsukasa Yoshida. Next, Nelson-Levy faced Slovenian 2021 European championships silver medalist Kaja Kajzer, losing in golden score, and finishing the competition in 7th place. Nelson-Levy won a bronze medal in mixed team event.

=== 2022–present; European Champion ===
Nelson-Levy competed at the 2022 European Championships in Sofia and won the gold medal. She defeated Olympic silver medalist Sarah-Léonie Cysique in the final. She said: "It’s a dream. I gave everything." She competed at the 2022 Tel Aviv Grand Slam, the 2022 Antalya Grand Slam, the 2022 Ulaanbaatar Grand Slam in Mongolia and the 2022 Budapest Grand Slam, winning a bronze medal in each.

Nelson-Levy competed in the 2023 European Championships Open in Kosovo and won the silver medal. Nelson-Levy competed in the 2023 Tel Aviv Grand Slam and the 2023 Baku Grand Slam, winning bronze medals in both. She also competed in the Israeli Championships in Eilat and won the gold medal.

Nelson-Levy competed at the 2024 European Championships in Zagreb, Croatia and won a bronze medal.

=== 2024 Paris Olympics ===
Nelson-Levy represented Israel at the 2024 Paris Olympics in judo in the women's 57 kg, and defeated Kaja Kajzer of Slovenia in the round-of-32 but lost to World Champion Mimi Huh from South Korea, and came in ninth. She also competed in the mixed team event, at which Team Israel came in ninth.

== Titles ==
Year	Tournament	Place	Ref.
2016	European Championships	3rd place, bronze medalist(s)	
2017	Grand Slam Baku	3rd place, bronze medalist(s)	
2017	Grand Prix Antalya	2nd place, silver medalist(s)	
2017	Grand Prix Tashkent	2nd place, silver medalist(s)	
2018	Grand Prix Agadir	1st place, gold medalist(s)	
2018	Grand Prix Tbilisi	3rd place, bronze medalist(s)	
2018	Grand Prix Cancún	3rd place, bronze medalist(s)	
2018	Grand Slam Abu Dhabi	3rd place, bronze medalist(s)	
2019	Grand Prix Tel Aviv	1st place, gold medalist(s)	
2019	Grand Prix Marrakesh	3rd place, bronze medalist(s)	
2019	Grand Prix Montreal	3rd place, bronze medalist(s)	
2020	Grand Slam Hungary	3rd place, bronze medalist(s)	
2021	Grand Slam Tel Aviv	1st place, gold medalist(s)	
2022	Grand Slam Tel Aviv	3rd place, bronze medalist(s)	
2022	Grand Slam Antalya	3rd place, bronze medalist(s)	
2022	European Championships	1st place, gold medalist(s)	
2022	Grand Slam Ulaanbaatar	3rd place, bronze medalist(s)	
2022	Grand Slam Budapest	3rd place, bronze medalist(s)	
2023	Grand Slam Tel Aviv	3rd place, bronze medalist(s)	
2024	European Championships	3rd place, bronze medalist(s)	
2025	Grand Slam Paris	2nd place, silver medalist(s)	
2025	Grand Slam Tashkent	3rd place, bronze medalist(s)	
2026	Grand Slam Tbilisi	1st place, gold medalist(s)	
2026	European Championships	2nd place, silver medalist(s)	

== See also ==
- List of Olympic medalists in judo
- List of 2020 Summer Olympics medal winners
- List of Jewish Olympic medalists
- List of Jews in Sports#Judo
- List of Israelis
- Sports in Israel
