= Judo at the 2022 Mediterranean Games – Women's 57 kg =

Judo competitions

Judo Women's 57 kg at the 2022 Mediterranean Games
- Venue: Mohammed Ben Ahmed Convention Centre – Hall 03 and 06
- Location: Oran, Algeria
- Date: 29 June
- Competitors: 9 from 9 nations

Medalists
gold medal	Marica Perišić	Serbia
silver medal	Giulia Caggiano	Italy
bronze medal	Anđela Samardžić	Bosnia and Herzegovina
bronze medal	Flaka Loxha	Kosovo

The women's 57 kg competition in judo at the 2022 Mediterranean Games was held on 29 June at the Mohammed Ben Ahmed Convention Centre in Oran.

== Results ==
=== Main bracket ===
Round of 16
Ophélie Vellozzi (FRA)	10
Teresa Santos (POR)	00

Quarterfinals
Marica Perišić (SRB)	10
Ophélie Vellozzi (FRA)	00
Anđela Samardžić (BIH)	00
Hasret Bozkurt (TUR)	10
Yamina Halata (ALG)	10
María Ruiz (ESP)	00
Flaka Loxha (KOS)	00
Giulia Caggiano (ITA)	10

Semifinals
Marica Perišić (SRB)	10
Hasret Bozkurt (TUR)	00
Yamina Halata (ALG)	00
Giulia Caggiano (ITA)	01

Final
Marica Perišić (SRB)	10
Giulia Caggiano (ITA)	00

=== Repechage ===
Repechage
Ophélie Vellozzi (FRA)	00
Anđela Samardžić (BIH)	01
María Ruiz (ESP)	00
Flaka Loxha (KOS)	10

Bronze medal
Anđela Samardžić (BIH)	01
Yamina Halata (ALG)	00
Flaka Loxha (KOS)	01
Hasret Bozkurt (TUR)	00
