= 2016 European Judo Championships – Women's 57 kg =

Judo Women's 57 kg at the 2016 European Judo Championships
- Venue: TatNeft Arena
- Location: Kazan, Russia
- Date: 23 April
- Competitors: 27 from 21 nations

Medalists
gold medal	Automne Pavia (3rd title)	France
silver medal	Ivelina Ilieva	Bulgaria
bronze medal	Timna Nelson-Levy	Israel
bronze medal	Nora Gjakova	Kosovo

Competition at external databases
- Links: IJF • JudoInside

The women's 57 kg competition at the 2016 European Judo Championships was held on 23 April at the TatNeft Arena, in Kazan, Russia.

== Results ==
=== Finals ===
Semi-finals
Ivelina Ilieva (BUL)	01
Nora Gjakova (KOS)	00
Hélène Receveaux (FRA)	00
Automne Pavia (FRA)	10

Final
Ivelina Ilieva (BUL)	00
Automne Pavia (FRA)	01

=== Repechage ===
Repechage
Viola Wächter (GER)	00
Timna Nelson-Levy (ISR)	00

Third place
Timna Nelson-Levy (ISR)	10
Hélène Receveaux (FRA)	00

Repechage
Nekoda Smythe-Davis (GBR)	10
Miryam Roper (GER)	00

Third place
Nekoda Smythe-Davis (GBR)	00
Nora Gjakova (KOS)	01

=== Pool A ===
First round
Salome Abashidze (GEO)	00
Ivelina Ilieva (BUL)	10
Viola Wächter (GER)	00
Jovana Rogić (SRB)	00
Sanne Verhagen (NED)	11
Manon Durbach (LUX)	00

Round of 16
Corina Căprioriu (ROU)	00
Ivelina Ilieva (BUL)	11
Viola Wächter (GER)	00
Sanne Verhagen (NED)	00

Quarterfinals
Ivelina Ilieva (BUL)	00
Viola Wächter (GER)	00

=== Pool B ===
First round
Anna Kuczera (POL)	00
Timna Nelson-Levy (ISR)	00
Nora Gjakova (KOS)	10
Daria Mezhetskaia (RUS)	00

Round of 16
Hedvig Karakas (HUN)	00
Timna Nelson-Levy (ISR)	01
Sabrina Filzmoser (AUT)	00
Nora Gjakova (KOS)	10

Quarterfinals
Timna Nelson-Levy (ISR)	00
Nora Gjakova (KOS)	10

=== Pool C ===
First round
Jaione Equisoain (ESP)	00
Emilie Amaron (SUI)	00
Nekoda Smythe-Davis (GBR)	10
Tatiana Kazeniuk (RUS)	00
Arleta Podolak (POL)	00
Loredana Ohâi (ROU)	00

Round of 16
Hélène Receveaux (FRA)	00
Emilie Amaron (SUI)	00
Nekoda Smythe-Davis (GBR)	01
Arleta Podolak (POL)	00

Quarterfinals
Hélène Receveaux (FRA)	00
Nekoda Smythe-Davis (GBR)	00

=== Pool D ===
First round
Camila Minakawa (ISR)	00
Maria Centracchio (ITA)	00
Miryam Roper (GER)	00
Shushana Hevondian (UKR)	00
Viktória Majorošová (SVK)	10
Tanja Božović (MNE)	00

Round of 16
Automne Pavia (FRA)	01
Maria Centracchio (ITA)	00
Miryam Roper (GER)	10
Viktória Majorošová (SVK)	00

Quarterfinals
Automne Pavia (FRA)	10
Miryam Roper (GER)	00
