= 2016 European Cadet Judo Championships =

Judo competition

Judo 2016 European Cadet Judo Championships
- Venue: Energia Areena
- Location: Vantaa, Finland
- Dates: 1–3 July 2016
- Competitors: 421 from 41 nations

Champions
- Men's team: Georgia (2nd title)
- Women's team: France (1st title)

Competition at external databases
- Links: IJF • JudoInside

The 2016 European Cadet Judo Championships is an edition of the European Cadet Judo Championships, organised by the International Judo Federation. It was held in Vantaa, Finland from 1 to 3 July 2016. The final day of competition featured team events, with team Georgia winning the men's event and team France the women's.

== Medal summary ==
=== Medal table ===
* Host nation (Finland)

Rank	Nation	Gold	Silver	Bronze	Total
1	Russia (RUS)	4	2	3	9
2	France (FRA)	2	1	2	5
3	Serbia (SRB)	2	0	2	4
4	Azerbaijan (AZE)	2	0	1	3
4	Ukraine (UKR)	2	0	1	3
6	Georgia (GEO)	1	2	3	6
7	Hungary (HUN)	1	2	0	3
8	Spain (ESP)	1	0	1	2
9	Latvia (LAT)	1	0	0	1
10	Italy (ITA)	0	2	1	3
11	Belarus (BLR)	0	2	0	2
12	Belgium (BEL)	0	1	1	2
13	Austria (AUT)	0	1	0	1
13	Denmark (DEN)	0	1	0	1
13	Finland (FIN)*	0	1	0	1
13	Portugal (POR)	0	1	0	1
17	Germany (GER)	0	0	4	4
18	Bosnia and Herzegovina (BIH)	0	0	2	2
18	Croatia (CRO)	0	0	2	2
18	Israel (ISR)	0	0	2	2
18	Netherlands (NED)	0	0	2	2
18	Slovenia (SLO)	0	0	2	2
23	Great Britain (GBR)	0	0	1	1
23	Romania (ROU)	0	0	1	1
23	Turkey (TUR)	0	0	1	1
Totals (25 entries)		16	16	32	64

=== Men's events ===
Event	Gold	Silver	Bronze
−50 kg	Rovshan Aliyev (AZE)	Csanád Feczkó (HUN)	Rashkhan Bakhishaliyev (AZE)
−50 kg	Rovshan Aliyev (AZE)	Csanád Feczkó (HUN)	Kharun Tlishev (RUS)
−55 kg	Ahmad Yusifov (AZE)	Dzmitry Muzhaila (BLR)	Biagio D'Angelo (ITA)
−55 kg	Ahmad Yusifov (AZE)	Dzmitry Muzhaila (BLR)	Chris Lammers (GER)
−60 kg	Konstantin Simeonidis (RUS)	Saba Grigalashvili (GEO)	Rosendo Laino (ESP)
−60 kg	Konstantin Simeonidis (RUS)	Saba Grigalashvili (GEO)	Kazbek Naguchev (RUS)
−66 kg	Artjoms Galaktionovs (LAT)	Mathias Czizsek (AUT)	Yehonatan Elbaz (ISR)
−66 kg	Artjoms Galaktionovs (LAT)	Mathias Czizsek (AUT)	Aleko Mamiashvili (GEO)
−73 kg	Zelim Tskaev (RUS)	Dmitrii Kharitonov (RUS)	Hugo Metifiot (FRA)
−73 kg	Zelim Tskaev (RUS)	Dmitrii Kharitonov (RUS)	Dilan Rechister (ISR)
−81 kg	Mykyta Matlashevskyi (UKR)	Oskari Makinen (FIN)	Eniel Caroly (FRA)
−81 kg	Mykyta Matlashevskyi (UKR)	Oskari Makinen (FIN)	Toni Miletić (BIH)
−90 kg	Dzhafar Kostoev (RUS)	Mathias Madsen (DEN)	Giorgi Chikovani (GEO)
−90 kg	Dzhafar Kostoev (RUS)	Mathias Madsen (DEN)	Yevhen Vehera (UKR)
+90 kg	Richárd Sipőcz (HUN)	Dzmitry Khakhlou (BLR)	Nika Dongvani (GEO)
+90 kg	Richárd Sipőcz (HUN)	Dzmitry Khakhlou (BLR)	Vasilije Vujicic (BIH)
Team	Georgia	Hungary	France
Team	Georgia	Hungary	Russia

=== Women's events ===
Event	Gold	Silver	Bronze
−40 kg	Charlene Quilghini (FRA)	Jente Verstraeten (BEL)	Dilan Dogan (TUR)
−40 kg	Charlene Quilghini (FRA)	Jente Verstraeten (BEL)	Lidia Marin (ROU)
−44 kg	Mireia Lapuerta Comas (ESP)	Justine Gaubert (FRA)	Olga Borisova (RUS)
−44 kg	Mireia Lapuerta Comas (ESP)	Justine Gaubert (FRA)	Loïs Petit (BEL)
−48 kg	Daria Bilodid (UKR)	Irena Khubulova (RUS)	Mascha Ballhaus (GER)
−48 kg	Daria Bilodid (UKR)	Irena Khubulova (RUS)	Andrea Stojadinov (SRB)
−52 kg	Nadežda Petrović (SRB)	Alexandra Maroti (HUN)	Nora Bannenberg (GER)
−52 kg	Nadežda Petrović (SRB)	Alexandra Maroti (HUN)	Jorien Visser (NED)
−57 kg	Eteri Liparteliani (GEO)	Nicolle D'Isanto (ITA)	Kaja Kajzer (SLO)
−57 kg	Eteri Liparteliani (GEO)	Nicolle D'Isanto (ITA)	Shannon van de Meeberg (NED)
−63 kg	Anja Obradović (SRB)	Nadia Simeoli (ITA)	Lara Kliba (CRO)
−63 kg	Anja Obradović (SRB)	Nadia Simeoli (ITA)	Jovana Obradovic (SRB)
−70 kg	Madina Taimazova (RUS)	Patrícia Sampaio (POR)	Chloe Nunn (GBR)
−70 kg	Madina Taimazova (RUS)	Patrícia Sampaio (POR)	Zala Pecoler (SLO)
+70 kg	Romane Dicko (FRA)	Sophio Somkhishvili (GEO)	Samira Bouizgarne (GER)
+70 kg	Romane Dicko (FRA)	Sophio Somkhishvili (GEO)	Helena Vuković (CRO)
Team	France	Serbia	Croatia
Team	France	Serbia	Netherlands

Source Results
