= 2022 European U23 Judo Championships =

Judo competition

Judo 2022 European U23 Judo Championships
- Venue: Arena Hotel Hills
- Location: Sarajevo, Bosnia and Herzegovina
- Dates: 28–30 October 2022
- Competitors: 300 from 40 nations

Champions
- Mixed team: Turkey (1st title)

Competition at external databases
- Links: IJF • EJU • JudoInside

The 2022 European U23 Judo Championships was held in at the Arena Hotel Hills in Sarajevo, Bosnia and Herzegovina, from 28 to 30 October 2022. The final day of competition featured a mixed team event, won by team Turkey.

== Schedule & event videos ==
The event aired on the EJU YouTube channel. The draw was held on 27 October at 16:00. All times are local (UTC+1).

	Date	Weight classes	Preliminaries				Final Block		
	Date	Weight classes	Start time	Videos			Start time	Videos	
Day 1	28 October	Men: –60, –66, –73 Women: –48, –52, –57, –63	09:30	Commentated			16:00	Commentated	
Day 1	28 October	Men: –60, –66, –73 Women: –48, –52, –57, –63	09:30	Tatami 1	Tatami 2	Tatami 3	16:00	Tatami 1	Tatami 2
Day 2	29 October	Men: –81, –90, –100, +100 Women: –70, –78, +78	10:30	Commentated			16:00	Commentated	
Day 2	29 October	Men: –81, –90, –100, +100 Women: –70, –78, +78	10:30	Tatami 1	Tatami 2	Tatami 3	16:00	Tatami 1	Tatami 2
Day 3	30 October	Mixed team	10:30	Commentated			15:00	Commentated	
Day 3	30 October	Mixed team	10:30	Tatami 1	Tatami 2	Tatami 3	15:00	Commentated	

== Medal summary ==
=== Men's events ===
Event	Gold	Silver	Bronze
Extra-lightweight (−60 kg)	Nazir Talibov; Azerbaijan	Kanan Ismayilov; Azerbaijan	Emiel Jaring; Netherlands
Extra-lightweight (−60 kg)	Nazir Talibov; Azerbaijan	Kanan Ismayilov; Azerbaijan	Alexandru Matei; Romania
Half-lightweight (−66 kg)	Maxime Gobert; France	Freddy Waizenegger; Switzerland	Orlando Cazorla; France
Half-lightweight (−66 kg)	Maxime Gobert; France	Freddy Waizenegger; Switzerland	Anthony De Angelis; Latvia
Lightweight (−73 kg)	Mark Hristov; Bulgaria	Joan-Benjamin Gaba; France	Koen Heg; Netherlands
Lightweight (−73 kg)	Mark Hristov; Bulgaria	Joan-Benjamin Gaba; France	Adil Osmanov; Moldova
Half-middleweight (−81 kg)	Arnaud Aregba; France	Tizie Gnamien; France	Muhammed Koç; Turkey
Half-middleweight (−81 kg)	Arnaud Aregba; France	Tizie Gnamien; France	Georgi Gramatikov; Bulgaria
Middleweight (−90 kg)	Nika Kharazishvili; Georgia	Marat Kryzhanskyi; Ukraine	Guy Gurevitch; Israel
Middleweight (−90 kg)	Nika Kharazishvili; Georgia	Marat Kryzhanskyi; Ukraine	Aleksa Mitrovic; France
Half-heavyweight (−100 kg)	Ilia Sulamanidze; Georgia	Zsombor Vég; Hungary	Enrico Bergamelli; Italy
Half-heavyweight (−100 kg)	Ilia Sulamanidze; Georgia	Zsombor Vég; Hungary	Marvin Belz; Germany
Heavyweight (+100 kg)	Richárd Sipőcz; Hungary	Münir Ertuğ; Turkey	Serafim Kompaniez; Israel
Heavyweight (+100 kg)	Richárd Sipőcz; Hungary	Münir Ertuğ; Turkey	Saba Inaneishvili; Georgia

=== Women's events ===
Event	Gold	Silver	Bronze
Extra-lightweight (−48 kg)	Sıla Ersin; Turkey	Konul Aliyeva; Azerbaijan	Raquel Brito; Portugal
Extra-lightweight (−48 kg)	Sıla Ersin; Turkey	Konul Aliyeva; Azerbaijan	Jente Verstraeten; Belgium
Half-lightweight (−52 kg)	Róza Gyertyás; Hungary	Ariane Toro; Spain	Annika Würfel; Germany
Half-lightweight (−52 kg)	Róza Gyertyás; Hungary	Ariane Toro; Spain	Nikolina Nišavić; Serbia
Lightweight (−57 kg)	Marica Perišić; Serbia	Hasret Bozkurt; Turkey	Thauany Capanni Dias; Italy
Lightweight (−57 kg)	Marica Perišić; Serbia	Hasret Bozkurt; Turkey	Anastasiia Chyzhevska; Ukraine
Half-middleweight (−63 kg)	Laura Fazliu; Kosovo	Annabelle Winzig; Germany	Antonietta Palumbo; Italy
Half-middleweight (−63 kg)	Laura Fazliu; Kosovo	Annabelle Winzig; Germany	Brigitta Varga; Hungary
Middleweight (−70 kg)	Samira Bock; Germany	Kaïla Issoufi; France	Nataliia Chystiakova; Ukraine
Middleweight (−70 kg)	Samira Bock; Germany	Kaïla Issoufi; France	Friederike Stolze; Germany
Half-heavyweight (−78 kg)	Petrunjela Pavić; Croatia	Lea Schmid; Germany	Nikolett Sági; Hungary
Half-heavyweight (−78 kg)	Petrunjela Pavić; Croatia	Lea Schmid; Germany	Liz Ngelebeya; France
Heavyweight (+78 kg)	Hilal Öztürk; Turkey	Ruslana Bulavina; Ukraine	Oxana Diacenco; Moldova
Heavyweight (+78 kg)	Hilal Öztürk; Turkey	Ruslana Bulavina; Ukraine	Nicki Norčič; Slovenia

Source Results

=== Mixed ===
Event	Gold	Silver	Bronze
Mixed team	Turkey	Germany	Hungary
Mixed team	Turkey	Germany	Georgia

=== Medal table ===
* Host nation (Bosnia and Herzegovina)

Rank	Nation	Gold	Silver	Bronze	Total
1	Turkey (TUR)	3	2	1	6
2	France (FRA)	2	3	3	8
3	Hungary (HUN)	2	1	3	6
4	Georgia (GEO)	2	0	2	4
5	Germany (GER)	1	3	3	7
6	Azerbaijan (AZE)	1	2	0	3
7	Bulgaria (BUL)	1	0	1	2
7	Serbia (SRB)	1	0	1	2
9	Croatia (CRO)	1	0	0	1
9	Kosovo (KOS)	1	0	0	1
11	Ukraine (UKR)	0	2	2	4
12	Spain (ESP)	0	1	0	1
12	Switzerland (SUI)	0	1	0	1
14	Italy (ITA)	0	0	3	3
15	Israel (ISR)	0	0	2	2
15	Moldova (MDA)	0	0	2	2
15	Netherlands (NED)	0	0	2	2
18	Belgium (BEL)	0	0	1	1
18	Latvia (LAT)	0	0	1	1
18	Portugal (POR)	0	0	1	1
18	Romania (ROU)	0	0	1	1
18	Slovenia (SLO)	0	0	1	1
Totals (22 entries)		15	15	30	60
