= 2023 European Judo Championships Open =

Judo 2023 European Judo Championships Open
- Venue: Palace of Youth and Sports
- Location: Pristina, Kosovo
- Date: 16 December 2023
- Competitors: 40 from 26 nations
- Total prize money: €300,000

Competition at external databases
- Links: IJF • EJU • JudoInside

The 2023 European Judo Championships Open was held at the Palace of Youth and Sports in Pristina, Kosovo, on 16 December 2023. The event was the inaugural edition of the European Judo Championships Open. The two events contested in the championships were ‍–‍73 kg for men and ‍–‍57 kg for women.

== Medal summary ==
=== Men's event ===
Event	Gold	Silver	Bronze
Lightweight (−73 kg)	Akil Gjakova; Kosovo	Manuel Lombardo; Italy	Hidayat Heydarov; Azerbaijan
Lightweight (−73 kg)	Akil Gjakova; Kosovo	Manuel Lombardo; Italy	Dardan Cena; Kosovo

=== Women's event ===
Event	Gold	Silver	Bronze
Lightweight (−57 kg)	Eteri Liparteliani; Georgia	Timna Nelson-Levy; Israel	Nora Gjakova; Kosovo
Lightweight (−57 kg)	Eteri Liparteliani; Georgia	Timna Nelson-Levy; Israel	Distria Krasniqi; Kosovo

=== Medal table ===
* Host nation (Kosovo)

Rank	Nation	Gold	Silver	Bronze	Total
1	Kosovo (KOS)*	1	0	3	4
2	Georgia (GEO)	1	0	0	1
3	Israel (ISR)	0	1	0	1
3	Italy (ITA)	0	1	0	1
5	Azerbaijan (AZE)	0	0	1	1
Totals (5 entries)		2	2	4	8

== Prize money ==
The sums written are per medalist, bringing the total prizes awarded to €300,000. (retrieved from:)

Medal	Total	Judoka	Coach
Gold	€55,000	€38,500	€16,500
Silver	€35,000	€24,500	€10,500
Bronze	€20,000	€14,000	€6,000
5th place	€10,000	€7,000	€3,000
