= 2025 Judo Grand Slam Tashkent =

Competition in Uzbekistan

Judo 2025 Judo Grand Slam Tashkent
- Venue: Yunusobod Sport Complex
- Location: Tashkent, Uzbekistan
- Dates: 28 February – 2 March 2025
- Competitors: 246 from 23 nations
- Total prize money: €154,000

Competition at external databases
- Links: IJF • JudoInside

The 2025 Judo Grand Slam Tashkent is a Judo Grand Slam tournament that was held at the Yunusobod Sport Complex in Tashkent, Uzbekistan, from 28 February to 2 March 2025 as part of the IJF World Tour.

== Medal summary ==
=== Men's events ===
Event	Gold	Silver	Bronze
Extra-lightweight (−60 kg)	Ayub Bliev (IJF)	Turan Bayramov (AZE)	Kamoliddin Bakhtiyorov (UZB)
Extra-lightweight (−60 kg)	Ayub Bliev (IJF)	Turan Bayramov (AZE)	Anvarjon Ibrohimov (UZB)
Half-lightweight (−66 kg)	Ramazan Abdulaev (IJF)	Zamohshari Bekmurodov (UZB)	Artyom Shturbabin (UZB)
Half-lightweight (−66 kg)	Ramazan Abdulaev (IJF)	Zamohshari Bekmurodov (UZB)	Mukhriddin Tilovov (UZB)
Lightweight (−73 kg)	Karen Galstian (IJF)	Danil Lavrentev (IJF)	Shakhram Ahadov (UZB)
Lightweight (−73 kg)	Karen Galstian (IJF)	Danil Lavrentev (IJF)	Maxime Gobert (FRA)
Half-middleweight (−81 kg)	Timur Arbuzov (IJF)	Arslonbek Tojiev (UZB)	Gadzhimurad Omarov (UAE)
Half-middleweight (−81 kg)	Timur Arbuzov (IJF)	Arslonbek Tojiev (UZB)	Abylaikhan Zhubanazar (KAZ)
Middleweight (−90 kg)	Shakhzodxuja Sharipov (UZB)	Komei Kawabata (JPN)	Eldar Allakhverdiev (IJF)
Middleweight (−90 kg)	Shakhzodxuja Sharipov (UZB)	Komei Kawabata (JPN)	Nurbek Murtozoev (UZB)
Half-heavyweight (−100 kg)	Matvey Kanikovskiy (IJF)	Adam Sangariev (IJF)	Ernazar Sarsenbaev (UZB)
Half-heavyweight (−100 kg)	Matvey Kanikovskiy (IJF)	Adam Sangariev (IJF)	Iván Felipe Silva Morales (CUB)
Heavyweight (+100 kg)	Denis Batchaev (IJF)	Valeriy Endovitskiy (IJF)	Alisher Yusupov (UZB)
Heavyweight (+100 kg)	Denis Batchaev (IJF)	Valeriy Endovitskiy (IJF)	Andy Granda (CUB)

=== Women's events ===
Event	Gold	Silver	Bronze
Extra-lightweight (−48 kg)	Kano Miyaki (JPN)	Hikari Yoshioka (JPN)	Sabina Giliazova (IJF)
Extra-lightweight (−48 kg)	Kano Miyaki (JPN)	Hikari Yoshioka (JPN)	Hui Xinran (CHN)
Half-lightweight (−52 kg)	Nanako Tsubone (JPN)	Ayumi Leiva Sánchez (ESP)	Mireia Lapuerta Comas (ESP)
Half-lightweight (−52 kg)	Nanako Tsubone (JPN)	Ayumi Leiva Sánchez (ESP)	Rin Takeuchi (JPN)
Lightweight (−57 kg)	Akari Omori (JPN)	Moa Ono (JPN)	Irina Zueva (IJF)
Lightweight (−57 kg)	Akari Omori (JPN)	Moa Ono (JPN)	Timna Nelson-Levy (ISR)
Half-middleweight (−63 kg)	Kirari Yamaguchi (JPN)	Inbal Shemesh (ISR)	Iva Oberan (CRO)
Half-middleweight (−63 kg)	Kirari Yamaguchi (JPN)	Inbal Shemesh (ISR)	Momo Tatsukawa (JPN)
Middleweight (−70 kg)	Rin Maeda (JPN)	Khurshida Razzokberdieva (UZB)	Giovanna Scoccimarro (GER)
Middleweight (−70 kg)	Rin Maeda (JPN)	Khurshida Razzokberdieva (UZB)	Liao Yu-jung (TPE)
Half-heavyweight (−78 kg)	Ma Zhenzhao (CHN)	Alina Böhm (GER)	Anna Monta Olek (GER)
Half-heavyweight (−78 kg)	Ma Zhenzhao (CHN)	Alina Böhm (GER)	Inbar Lanir (ISR)
Heavyweight (+78 kg)	Niu Xinran (CHN)	Chihiro Yamaguchi (JPN)	Ayiman Jinesinuer (CHN)
Heavyweight (+78 kg)	Niu Xinran (CHN)	Chihiro Yamaguchi (JPN)	Julia Tolofua (FRA)

=== Medal table ===
* Host nation (Uzbekistan)

Rank	Nation	Gold	Silver	Bronze	Total
–	International Judo Federation (IJF)	6	3	3	12
1	Japan (JPN)	5	4	2	11
2	China (CHN)	2	0	2	4
3	Uzbekistan (UZB)*	1	3	8	12
4	Germany (GER)	0	1	2	3
4	Israel (ISR)	0	1	2	3
6	Spain (ESP)	0	1	1	2
7	Azerbaijan (AZE)	0	1	0	1
8	Cuba (CUB)	0	0	2	2
8	France (FRA)	0	0	2	2
10	Chinese Taipei (TPE)	0	0	1	1
10	Croatia (CRO)	0	0	1	1
10	Kazakhstan (KAZ)	0	0	1	1
10	United Arab Emirates (UAE)	0	0	1	1
Totals (13 entries)		14	14	28	56

== Prize money ==
The sums written are per medalist, bringing the total prizes awarded to €154,000. (retrieved from:)

Medal	Total	Judoka	Coach
Gold	€5,000	€4,000	€1,000
Silver	€3,000	€2,400	€600
Bronze	€1,500	€1,200	€300
