= Judo at the 2020 Summer Olympics – Women's 57 kg =

Judo competition

Women's 57 kg at the Games of the XXXII Olympiad
- Venue: Nippon Budokan
- Date: 26 July 2021
- Competitors: 25 from 25 nations

Medalists
1st place, gold medalist(s)		Nora Gjakova	Kosovo
2nd place, silver medalist(s)		Sarah-Léonie Cysique	France
3rd place, bronze medalist(s)		Tsukasa Yoshida	Japan
3rd place, bronze medalist(s)		Jessica Klimkait	Canada

The women's 57 kg competition in judo at the 2020 Summer Olympics in Tokyo was held on 26 July 2021 at the Nippon Budokan.

== Results ==
=== Finals ===
Semi-finals
1 Jessica Klimkait (CAN)	00
4 Sarah-Léonie Cysique (FRA)	10
2 Tsukasa Yoshida (JPN)	00
3 Nora Gjakova (KOS)	01

Gold medal
4 Sarah-Léonie Cysique (FRA)	00
3 Nora Gjakova (KOS)	10

=== Repechage ===
Repechage
Julia Kowalczyk (POL)	00
Eteri Liparteliani (GEO)	01

Bronze medal
2 Tsukasa Yoshida (JPN)	10
Eteri Liparteliani (GEO)	00

Repechage
7 Timna Nelson-Levy (ISR)	00
Kaja Kajzer (SLO)	10

Bronze medal
1 Jessica Klimkait (CAN)	01
Kaja Kajzer (SLO)	00

=== Pool A ===
Round of 32
Ghofran Khelifi (TUN)	00
Ivelina Ilieva (BUL)	10
8 Telma Monteiro (POR)	10
Zouleiha Abzetta Dabonne (CIV)	00
Julia Kowalczyk (POL)	01
Hedvig Karakas (HUN)	00

Round of 16
1 Jessica Klimkait (CAN)	10
Ivelina Ilieva (BUL)	00
8 Telma Monteiro (POR)	00
Julia Kowalczyk (POL)	10

Quarter-finals
1 Jessica Klimkait (CAN)	10
Julia Kowalczyk (POL)	00

=== Pool B ===
Round of 32
Kim Ji-su (KOR)	10
Miryam Roper (PAN)	00
Diassonema Mucungui (ANG)	00
Eteri Liparteliani (GEO)	10

Round of 16
4 Sarah-Léonie Cysique (FRA)	01
Kim Ji-su (KOR)	00
5 Theresa Stoll (GER)	00
Eteri Liparteliani (GEO)	10

Quarter-finals
4 Sarah-Léonie Cysique (FRA)	10
Eteri Liparteliani (GEO)	01

=== Pool C ===
Round of 32
Daria Mezhetskaia (ROC)	01
Lu Tongjuan (CHN)	10
Sanda Aldass (EOR)	00
Marica Perišić (SRB)	10

Round of 16
2 Tsukasa Yoshida (JPN)	10
Lu Tongjuan (CHN)	00
7 Timna Nelson-Levy (ISR)	10
Marica Perišić (SRB)	00

Quarter-finals
2 Tsukasa Yoshida (JPN)	01
7 Timna Nelson-Levy (ISR)	00

=== Pool D ===
Round of 32
Sabrina Filzmoser (AUT)	00
Sanne Verhagen (NED)	10
Sumiya Dorjsuren (MGL)	00
Kaja Kajzer (SLO)	01

Round of 16
3 Nora Gjakova (KOS)	01
Sanne Verhagen (NED)	00
6 Lien Chen-ling (TPE)	00
Kaja Kajzer (SLO)	10

Quarter-finals
3 Nora Gjakova (KOS)	11
Kaja Kajzer (SLO)	00
