= Viola Wächter =

German judoka (born 1987)

Personal information
- Born: 7 February 1987 (age 39)
- Occupation: Judoka

Sport
- Country: Germany
- Sport: Judo
- Weight class: ‍–‍57 kg

Achievements and titles
- World Champ.: R16 (2010, 2015)
- European Champ.: 7th (2009, 2011, 2016)
Medal record
Women's judo
Representing Germany
European Games
Silver medal – second place	2015 Baku	Women's team
IJF Grand Slam
Bronze medal – third place	2010 Rio de Janeiro	‍–‍57 kg
Bronze medal – third place	2010 Moscow	‍–‍57 kg
Bronze medal – third place	2015 Abu Dhabi	‍–‍57 kg
IJF Grand Prix
Gold medal – first place	2015 Samsun	‍–‍57 kg
Silver medal – second place	2015 Budapest	‍–‍57 kg
Bronze medal – third place	2010 Rotterdam	‍–‍57 kg
Bronze medal – third place	2015 Tbilisi	‍–‍57 kg
Bronze medal – third place	2015 Jeju	‍–‍57 kg
Bronze medal – third place	2017 Hohhot	‍–‍57 kg
World Juniors Championships
Silver medal – second place	2006 Santo Domingo	‍–‍57 kg
European Cadet Championships
Silver medal – second place	2002 Győr	‍–‍48 kg

Profile at external databases
- IJF: 1938
- JudoInside.com: 15584
- Updated on 8 July 2024

Viola Wächter (born 7 February 1987) is a German judoka.

Wächter is a bronze medalist of the 2017 Judo Grand Prix Hohhot in the ‍–‍57 kg category.
