= Judo at the 2017 European Youth Summer Olympic Festival =

Judo Judo at the 2017 European Youth Summer Olympic Festival
- Venue: Olimpiai Sportpark Győr
- Location: Győr, Hungary
- Dates: 25–28 July 2017
- Competitors: 326 from 47 nations

Competition at external databases
- Links: IJF • EJU • JudoInside

The Judo at the 2017 European Youth Summer Olympic Festival contests were held at the Radnóti street Sport Centre in Győr, Hungary, from 25 to 28 July 2017.

== Medalists ==
=== Boys ===
Event	Gold	Silver	Bronze
−50 kg	Csanád Feczkó (HUN)	Daan Moes (NED)	Ejder Toktay (TUR)
−50 kg	Csanád Feczkó (HUN)	Daan Moes (NED)	Uladzislau Dubrouski (BLR)
−55 kg	Mihraç Akkuş (TUR)	Beka Tsifiani (GEO)	Oleh Veredyba (UKR)
−55 kg	Mihraç Akkuş (TUR)	Beka Tsifiani (GEO)	Arman Gambarian (RUS)
−60 kg	Botond Szeredás (HUN)	Samuel Gassner (AUT)	Khetag Basaev (RUS)
−60 kg	Botond Szeredás (HUN)	Samuel Gassner (AUT)	Jan Svoboda (CZE)
−66 kg	Giorgi Chikhelidze (GEO)	Petru Pelivan (MDA)	Artjoms Galaktionovs (LAT)
−66 kg	Giorgi Chikhelidze (GEO)	Petru Pelivan (MDA)	Karen Galstian (RUS)
−73 kg	Muhammed Koç (TUR)	Daniil Matveev (RUS)	Manuel Rodrigues (POR)
−73 kg	Muhammed Koç (TUR)	Daniil Matveev (RUS)	Gergely Nerpel (HUN)
−81 kg	Mansur Lorsanov (RUS)	Benedek Tóth (HUN)	Eugen Matveiciuc (MDA)
−81 kg	Mansur Lorsanov (RUS)	Benedek Tóth (HUN)	Vladimir Akhalkatsi (GEO)
−90 kg	Mikheili Bekauri (GEO)	Denis Turac (SVK)	Eduard Şerban (ROU)
−90 kg	Mikheili Bekauri (GEO)	Denis Turac (SVK)	Adil Karimli (AZE)
+90 kg	Richárd Sipőcz (HUN)	Wojciech Kordyalik (POL)	Levan Tchelidze (GEO)
+90 kg	Richárd Sipőcz (HUN)	Wojciech Kordyalik (POL)	Ömer Aydın (TUR)
Team	Russia (RUS)	Turkey (TUR)	Hungary (HUN)
Team	Russia (RUS)	Turkey (TUR)	Georgia (GEO)

=== Girls ===
Event	Gold	Silver	Bronze
−40 kg	Jente Verstraeten (BEL)	Vusala Karimova (AZE)	Ana Bjelic (SRB)
−40 kg	Jente Verstraeten (BEL)	Vusala Karimova (AZE)	Liliana Salimianova (RUS)
−44 kg	Amy Platten (GBR)	Timea Kardos (HUN)	Özge Andiç (TUR)
−44 kg	Amy Platten (GBR)	Timea Kardos (HUN)	Hlafira Bakhur (BLR)
−48 kg	Andrea Stojadinov (SRB)	Naomi van Krevel (NED)	Brigitta Varga (HUN)
−48 kg	Andrea Stojadinov (SRB)	Naomi van Krevel (NED)	Zeliha Cinci (TUR)
−52 kg	Gefen Primo (ISR)	Ramona Micula (ROU)	Szofi Özbas (HUN)
−52 kg	Gefen Primo (ISR)	Ramona Micula (ROU)	Lou-Ann Masson (FRA)
−57 kg	Kaja Kajzer (SLO)	Marica Perišić (SRB)	Natalia Kropska (POL)
−57 kg	Kaja Kajzer (SLO)	Marica Perišić (SRB)	Josie Steele (GBR)
−63 kg	Mariam Tchanturia (GEO)	Anja Obradović (SRB)	Zarja Tavcar (SLO)
−63 kg	Mariam Tchanturia (GEO)	Anja Obradović (SRB)	Anđela Samardžić (BIH)
−70 kg	Viktoryia Novikava (BLR)	Nataliia Chystiakova (UKR)	Lea Adam Sendra (AND)
−70 kg	Viktoryia Novikava (BLR)	Nataliia Chystiakova (UKR)	Nina Geršiová (SVK)
+70 kg	Sophio Somkhishvili (GEO)	Justina Kmieliauskaitė (LTU)	Marit Kamps (NED)
+70 kg	Sophio Somkhishvili (GEO)	Justina Kmieliauskaitė (LTU)	Petra Faragó (HUN)
Team	Italy (ITA); Matilda Avila; Alessia Tedeschi; Irene Pedrotti; Elisa Toniolo; Betty Vuk; Vanessa Origgi	Russia (RUS)	Turkey (TUR)
Team	Italy (ITA); Matilda Avila; Alessia Tedeschi; Irene Pedrotti; Elisa Toniolo; Betty Vuk; Vanessa Origgi	Russia (RUS)	Serbia (SRB)

== Medal table ==
* Host nation (Hungary)

Rank	Nation	Gold	Silver	Bronze	Total
1	Georgia (GEO)	4	1	3	8
2	Hungary (HUN)*	3	2	5	10
3	Russia (RUS)	2	2	4	8
4	Turkey (TUR)	2	1	5	8
5	Serbia (SRB)	1	2	2	5
6	Belarus (BLR)	1	0	2	3
7	Great Britain (GBR)	1	0	1	2
7	Slovenia (SLO)	1	0	1	2
9	Belgium (BEL)	1	0	0	1
9	Israel (ISR)	1	0	0	1
9	Italy (ITA)	1	0	0	1
12	Netherlands (NED)	0	2	1	3
13	Azerbaijan (AZE)	0	1	1	2
13	Moldova (MDA)	0	1	1	2
13	Poland (POL)	0	1	1	2
13	Romania (ROU)	0	1	1	2
13	Slovakia (SVK)	0	1	1	2
13	Ukraine (UKR)	0	1	1	2
19	Austria (AUT)	0	1	0	1
19	Lithuania (LTU)	0	1	0	1
21	Andorra (AND)	0	0	1	1
21	Bosnia and Herzegovina (BIH)	0	0	1	1
21	Czech Republic (CZE)	0	0	1	1
21	France (FRA)	0	0	1	1
21	Latvia (LAT)	0	0	1	1
21	Portugal (POR)	0	0	1	1
Totals (26 entries)		18	18	36	72
