= 2022 European Judo Championships =

Judo 2022 European Judo Championships
- Venue: Armeets Arena
- Location: Sofia, Bulgaria
- Dates: 29 April–1 May 2022
- Competitors: 361 from 40 nations

Competition at external databases
- Links: IJF • JudoInside

The 2022 European Judo Championships was held in Sofia, Bulgaria, from 29 April to 1 May 2022.

== Event videos ==
The event will air freely on the IJF YouTube channel.

| | Weight classes | Preliminaries | | | Final Block |
|---|---|---|---|---|---|
| Day 1 | Men: -60, -66 Women: -48, -52, -57 | Commentated | | | Commentated |
| Day 1 | Men: -60, -66 Women: -48, -52, -57 | Tatami 1 | Tatami 2 | Tatami 3 | Commentated |
| Day 2 | Men: -73, -81 Women: -63, -70 | Commentated | | | Commentated |
| Day 2 | Men: -73, -81 Women: -63, -70 | Tatami 1 | Tatami 2 | Tatami 3 | Commentated |
| Day 3 | Men: -90, -100, +100 Women: -78, +78 | Commentated | | | Commentated |
| Day 3 | Men: -90, -100, +100 Women: -78, +78 | Tatami 1 | Tatami 2 | Tatami 3 | Commentated |

== Medal summary ==
=== Medal table ===
* Host nation (Bulgaria)

| Rank | Nation | Gold | Silver | Bronze | Total |
|---|---|---|---|---|---|
| 1 | France | 3 | 2 | 3 | 8 |
| 2 | Netherlands | 2 | 2 | 1 | 5 |
| 3 | Georgia | 2 | 0 | 2 | 4 |
| 4 | Great Britain | 2 | 0 | 0 | 2 |
| 5 | Israel | 1 | 1 | 2 | 4 |
| 5 | Spain | 1 | 1 | 2 | 4 |
| 7 | Germany | 1 | 1 | 0 | 2 |
| 8 | Azerbaijan | 1 | 0 | 2 | 3 |
| 9 | Ukraine | 1 | 0 | 0 | 1 |
| 10 | Belgium | 0 | 1 | 3 | 4 |
| 10 | Italy | 0 | 1 | 3 | 4 |
| 12 | Bulgaria* | 0 | 1 | 1 | 2 |
| 12 | Kosovo | 0 | 1 | 1 | 2 |
| 14 | Poland | 0 | 1 | 0 | 1 |
| 14 | Portugal | 0 | 1 | 0 | 1 |
| 14 | Serbia | 0 | 1 | 0 | 1 |
| 17 | Hungary | 0 | 0 | 2 | 2 |
| 18 | Croatia | 0 | 0 | 1 | 1 |
| 18 | Greece | 0 | 0 | 1 | 1 |
| 18 | Moldova | 0 | 0 | 1 | 1 |
| 18 | Slovenia | 0 | 0 | 1 | 1 |
| 18 | Switzerland | 0 | 0 | 1 | 1 |
| 18 | Turkey | 0 | 0 | 1 | 1 |
| Totals (23 entries) | | 14 | 14 | 28 | 56 |

=== Men's events ===
| Event | Gold | Silver | Bronze |
|---|---|---|---|
| Extra-lightweight (–60 kg) | Francisco Garrigós; Spain | Yanislav Gerchev; Bulgaria | Cédric Revol; France |
| Extra-lightweight (–60 kg) | Francisco Garrigós; Spain | Yanislav Gerchev; Bulgaria | Jorre Verstraeten; Belgium |
| Half-lightweight (–66 kg) | Bogdan Iadov; Ukraine | Alberto Gaitero Martin; Spain | Elios Manzi; Italy |
| Half-lightweight (–66 kg) | Bogdan Iadov; Ukraine | Alberto Gaitero Martin; Spain | Denis Vieru; Moldova |
| Lightweight (–73 kg) | Hidayat Heydarov; Azerbaijan | Giovanni Esposito; Italy | Mark Hristov; Bulgaria |
| Lightweight (–73 kg) | Hidayat Heydarov; Azerbaijan | Giovanni Esposito; Italy | Rustam Orujov; Azerbaijan |
| Half-middleweight (–81 kg) | Tato Grigalashvili; Georgia | Matthias Casse; Belgium | Sami Chouchi; Belgium |
| Half-middleweight (–81 kg) | Tato Grigalashvili; Georgia | Matthias Casse; Belgium | Attila Ungvári; Hungary |
| Middleweight (–90 kg) | Luka Maisuradze; Georgia | Darko Brašnjović; Serbia | Mammadali Mehdiyev; Azerbaijan |
| Middleweight (–90 kg) | Luka Maisuradze; Georgia | Darko Brašnjović; Serbia | Theodoros Tselidis; Greece |
| Half-heavyweight (–100 kg) | Michael Korrel; Netherlands | Piotr Kuczera; Poland | Nikoloz Sherazadishvili; Spain |
| Half-heavyweight (–100 kg) | Michael Korrel; Netherlands | Piotr Kuczera; Poland | Daniel Eich; Switzerland |
| Heavyweight (+100 kg) | Jur Spijkers; Netherlands | Johannes Frey; Germany | Roy Meyer; Netherlands |
| Heavyweight (+100 kg) | Jur Spijkers; Netherlands | Johannes Frey; Germany | Guram Tushishvili; Georgia |

=== Women's events ===
| Event | Gold | Silver | Bronze |
|---|---|---|---|
| Extra-lightweight (–48 kg) | Shirine Boukli; France | Catarina Costa; Portugal | Julia Figueroa; Spain |
| Extra-lightweight (–48 kg) | Shirine Boukli; France | Catarina Costa; Portugal | Shira Rishony; Israel |
| Half-lightweight (–52 kg) | Chelsie Giles; Great Britain | Amandine Buchard; France | Distria Krasniqi; Kosovo |
| Half-lightweight (–52 kg) | Chelsie Giles; Great Britain | Amandine Buchard; France | Ana Viktorija Puljiz; Croatia |
| Lightweight (–57 kg) | Timna Nelson-Levy; Israel | Sarah-Léonie Cysique; France | Mina Libeer; Belgium |
| Lightweight (–57 kg) | Timna Nelson-Levy; Israel | Sarah-Léonie Cysique; France | Eteri Liparteliani; Georgia |
| Half-middleweight (–63 kg) | Gemma Howell; Great Britain | Laura Fazliu; Kosovo | Szofi Özbas; Hungary |
| Half-middleweight (–63 kg) | Gemma Howell; Great Britain | Laura Fazliu; Kosovo | Gili Sharir; Israel |
| Middleweight (–70 kg) | Marie-Ève Gahié; France | Sanne van Dijke; Netherlands | Margaux Pinot; France |
| Middleweight (–70 kg) | Marie-Ève Gahié; France | Sanne van Dijke; Netherlands | Anka Pogačnik; Slovenia |
| Half-heavyweight (–78 kg) | Alina Böhm; Germany | Guusje Steenhuis; Netherlands | Madeleine Malonga; France |
| Half-heavyweight (–78 kg) | Alina Böhm; Germany | Guusje Steenhuis; Netherlands | Alice Bellandi; Italy |
| Heavyweight (+78 kg) | Romane Dicko; France | Raz Hershko; Israel | Asya Tavano; Italy |
| Heavyweight (+78 kg) | Romane Dicko; France | Raz Hershko; Israel | Sebile Akbulut; Turkey |

== Participating nations ==
A total of competitors from nations were set to participate.

- Albania (1)
- Armenia (2)
- Austria (10)
- Azerbaijan (11)
- Belgium (7)
- Bosnia and Herzegovina (5)
- Bulgaria (17)
- Croatia (11)
- Cyprus (6)
- Czech Republic (7)
- Denmark (3)
- Spain (18)
- Estonia (6)
- Finland (2)
- France (18)
- Great Britain (16)
- Georgia (11)
- Germany (15)
- Greece (7)
- Hungary (11)
- Ireland (5)
- Israel (17)
- Italy (18)
- Kosovo (4)
- Latvia (1)
- Lithuania (4)
- Moldova (10)
- North Macedonia (2)
- Montenegro (3)
- Netherlands (17)
- Poland (12)
- Portugal (11)
- Romania (9)
- Slovenia (9)
- Serbia (15)
- Switzerland (4)
- Slovakia (4)
- Sweden (2)
- Turkey (15)
- Ukraine (15)
