= Arleta Podolak =

Polish judoka (born 1993)

Personal information
- Born: 24 October 1993 (age 32)
- Occupation: Judoka

Sport
- Country: Poland
- Sport: Judo
- Weight class: ‍–‍57 kg

Achievements and titles
- Olympic Games: R32 (2016)
- World Champ.: R16 (2014, 2024)
- European Champ.: R16 (2016, 2022, 2023)
Medal record
Women's judo
Representing Poland
IJF Grand Slam
Bronze medal – third place	2024 Tashkent	‍–‍57 kg
IJF Grand Prix
Gold medal – first place	2016 Almaty	‍–‍57 kg
Bronze medal – third place	2014 Tashkent	‍–‍57 kg
Bronze medal – third place	2023 Perth	‍–‍57 kg
European U23 Championships
Bronze medal – third place	2015 Bratislava	‍–‍57 kg
World Juniors Championships
Gold medal – first place	2013 Ljubljana	‍–‍57 kg
European Junior Championships
Bronze medal – third place	2013 Sarajevo	‍–‍57 kg

Profile at external databases
- IJF: 3884
- JudoInside.com: 49972
- Updated on 20 May 2024

Arleta Podolak (born 24 October 1993, in Warsaw) is a Polish judoka. She competed at the 2016 Summer Olympics in the women's 57 kg event, in which she was eliminated in the first round by Lien Chen-ling.
