= Julie Beurskens =

Dutch judoka (born 2004)

Personal information
- Nationality: Dutch
- Born: 12 July 2004 (age 22) Amersfoort, Netherlands
- Occupation: Judoka

Sport
- Country: Netherlands
- Sport: Judo
- Weight class: ‍–‍57 kg
- Coached by: Theo Meijer

Achievements and titles
- Olympic Games: R32 (2024)
- World Champ.: R32 (2024)
- European Champ.: R16 (2023)
Medal record
Women's judo
Representing the Netherlands
World Championships
Bronze medal – third place	2023 Doha	Mixed team
IJF Grand Slam
Bronze medal – third place	2023 Astana	‍–‍57 kg
Bronze medal – third place	2025 Abu Dhabi	‍–‍57 kg
IJF Grand Prix
Silver medal – second place	2024 Linz	‍–‍57 kg
World Juniors Championships
Bronze medal – third place	2023 Odivelas	‍–‍57 kg
European Junior Championships
Gold medal – first place	2022 Prague	‍–‍57 kg
European Youth Olympic Festival
Silver medal – second place	2022 Banská Bystrica	‍–‍57 kg

Profile at external databases
- IJF: 52851
- JudoInside.com: 104422
- Updated on 28 November 2025

Julie Beurskens (born 12 July 2004) is a Dutch judoka. Beurskens won a gold medal at the 2022 European Junior Championships and a silver medal at the 2024 Linz Grand Prix. She is member of the Dutch team that won a bronze medal at the mixed team event of the 2023 World Championships. She competes in the ‍–‍57 kg category.

== Sporting career ==
Beurskens started to practice judo at the age of five. She trained at Theo Meijer´s gym in Leusden. At 14 she was national junior champion. In 2021 Beurskens was national open champion in the -52 category and in 2022 and 2025 in the -57 category.

Her international breakthrough came in 2022 when she won the European Junior title in Prague. She moved to National Sports Center Papendal and became a professional judoka while pursuing at the same time a college degree.

Beurskens placed second at the 2024 Judo Grand Prix in Linz and fifth at the Judo Grand Slam in Baku. Based on her international ranking, Beurskens obtained a continental quota nomination for the 2024 Summer Olympics.

With her nomination, Beurskens completed the Dutch mixed team for Paris. This Dutch team, including Beurskens, was bronze medallist at the 2023 World Judo Championships.
