= Nora Gjakova =

Kosovar judoka (born 1992)

Nora Gjakova NK
Personal information
- Nationality: Kosovar
- Born: 17 August 1992 (age 33) Peja, FR Yugoslavia (now Kosovo)
- Occupation: Judoka
- Years active: 2002–2025
- Height: 1.65 m (5 ft 5 in)
- Website: noragjakova.com
- Military career
- Allegiance: Albania
- Branch: Albanian Armed Forces
- Service years: 2021–
- Rank: Colonel

Sport
- Country: Kosovo
- Sport: Judo
- Weight class: ‍–‍57 kg, ‍–‍63 kg
- Retired: 31 December 2025

Achievements and titles
- Olympic Games: (gold) (2020)
- World Champ.: (bronze) (2021)
- European Champ.: (gold) (2018)
Medal record
Women's judo
Representing Kosovo
Olympic Games
Gold medal – first place	2020 Tokyo	‍–‍57 kg
World Championships
Bronze medal – third place	2021 Budapest	‍–‍57 kg
European Games
Silver medal – second place	2019 Minsk	‍–‍57 kg
Bronze medal – third place	2015 Baku	‍–‍57 kg
European Championships
Gold medal – first place	2018 Tel Aviv	‍–‍57 kg
Bronze medal – third place	2016 Kazan	‍–‍57 kg
Bronze medal – third place	2017 Warsaw	‍–‍57 kg
Bronze medal – third place	2021 Lisbon	‍–‍57 kg
Bronze medal – third place	2023 Montpellier	‍–‍57 kg
European Championships Open
Bronze medal – third place	2023 Pristina	‍–‍57 kg
World Masters
Silver medal – second place	2018 Guangzhou	‍–‍57 kg
Bronze medal – third place	2021 Doha	‍–‍57 kg
IJF Grand Slam
Gold medal – first place	2018 Abu Dhabi	‍–‍57 kg
Gold medal – first place	2021 Tbilisi	‍–‍57 kg
Gold medal – first place	2023 Baku	‍–‍57 kg
Silver medal – second place	2022 Abu Dhabi	‍–‍57 kg
Silver medal – second place	2023 Tbilisi	‍–‍57 kg
Silver medal – second place	2023 Astana	‍–‍57 kg
Silver medal – second place	2024 Baku	‍–‍57 kg
Bronze medal – third place	2020 Paris	‍–‍57 kg
Bronze medal – third place	2022 Baku	‍–‍57 kg
Bronze medal – third place	2025 Paris	‍–‍63 kg
IJF Grand Prix
Gold medal – first place	2017 Antalya	‍–‍57 kg
Gold medal – first place	2017 The Hague	‍–‍57 kg
Gold medal – first place	2018 Tunis	‍–‍57 kg
Gold medal – first place	2018 Antalya	‍–‍57 kg
Gold medal – first place	2019 Tbilisi	‍–‍57 kg
Silver medal – second place	2016 Tbilisi	‍–‍57 kg
Silver medal – second place	2018 Tashkent	‍–‍57 kg
Silver medal – second place	2019 Budapest	‍–‍57 kg
Bronze medal – third place	2012 Abu Dhabi	‍–‍57 kg
Bronze medal – third place	2013 Rijeka	‍–‍57 kg
Bronze medal – third place	2016 Havana	‍–‍57 kg
Bronze medal – third place	2020 Tel Aviv	‍–‍57 kg
European U23 Championships
Gold medal – first place	2014 Wrocław	‍–‍57 kg
Mediterranean Games
Gold medal – first place	2018 Tarragona	‍–‍57 kg

Profile at external databases
- IJF: 422
- JudoInside.com: 52299
- Updated on 2 February 2025

Nora Gjakova NK (Albanian pronunciation: [noˈɾa ɟaˈkova]; born 17 August 1992) is a Kosovo Albanian retired judoka. She won a gold medal in the women's 57 kg judo event at the 2020 Summer Olympics in Tokyo, Japan. In August 2021, she was awarded the Honour of the Nation Decoration of Albania by the President of Albania.

== Career ==
Gjakova won 2 Continental Opens in 2015, in Tunis and Lisbon. Coached by Driton Kuka, Gjakova meanwhile won 11 World Cup medals.

On 21 April 2016, Gjakova earned a bronze medal at the 2016 European Championships in Kazan, Russia.

Gjakova won one of the bronze medals in her event at the 2021 World Masters held in Doha, Qatar. A few months later, she won the gold medal in women's 57 kg at the 2020 Summer Olympics in Tokyo.

== Personal life ==
Gjakova's brother, Akil Gjakova, is also a judoka, and gold medalist at the 2018 Mediterranean Games and the 2021 European Championships.
