= Sarah-Léonie Cysique =

French judoka (born 1998)

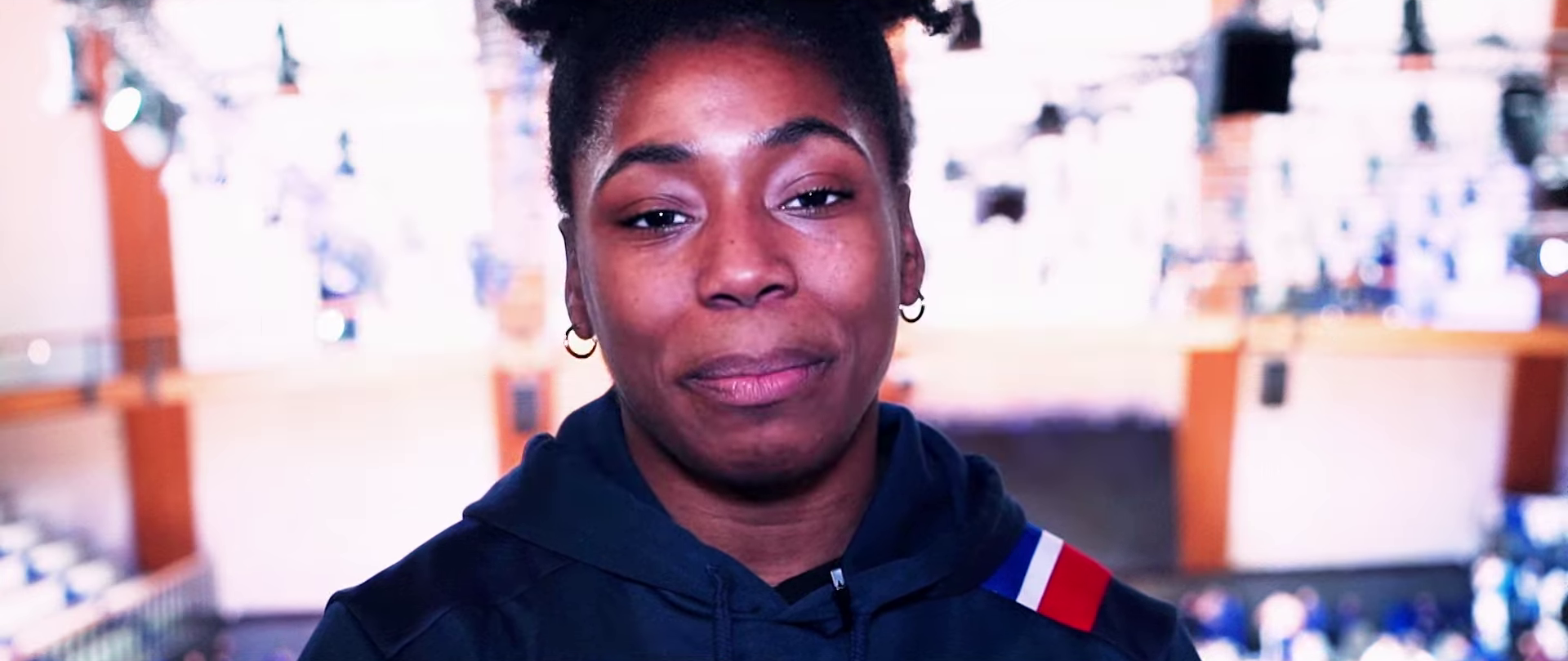
- Cysique in 2024

Personal information
- Born: 6 July 1998 (age 28) Sarcelles, France
- Occupation: Judoka

Sport
- Country: France
- Sport: Judo
- Weight class: ‍–‍57 kg

Achievements and titles
- Olympic Games: (silver) (2020)
- World Champ.: (bronze) (2025)
- European Champ.: (silver) (2022)
Medal record
Women's judo
Representing France
Olympic Games
Gold medal – first place	2020 Tokyo	Mixed team
Gold medal – first place	2024 Paris	Mixed team
Silver medal – second place	2020 Tokyo	‍–‍57 kg
Bronze medal – third place	2024 Paris	‍–‍57 kg
World Championships
Silver medal – second place	2019 Tokyo	Mixed team
Silver medal – second place	2022 Tashkent	Mixed team
Silver medal – second place	2023 Doha	Mixed team
Bronze medal – third place	2025 Budapest	‍–‍57 kg
European Championships
Silver medal – second place	2022 Sofia	‍–‍57 kg
Bronze medal – third place	2020 Prague	‍–‍57 kg
Bronze medal – third place	2021 Lisbon	‍–‍57 kg
Bronze medal – third place	2023 Montpellier	‍–‍57 kg
Bronze medal – third place	2026 Tbilisi	‍–‍57 kg
World Masters
Silver medal – second place	2021 Doha	‍–‍57 kg
Silver medal – second place	2022 Jerusalem	‍–‍57 kg
Silver medal – second place	2023 Budapest	‍–‍57 kg
IJF Grand Slam
Gold medal – first place	2023 Astana	‍–‍57 kg
Gold medal – first place	2025 Dushanbe	‍–‍57 kg
Gold medal – first place	2026 Paris	‍–‍57 kg
Silver medal – second place	2019 Abu Dhabi	‍–‍57 kg
Silver medal – second place	2020 Düsseldorf	‍–‍57 kg
Silver medal – second place	2021 Tel Aviv	‍–‍57 kg
Silver medal – second place	2022 Antalya	‍–‍57 kg
Silver medal – second place	2024 Dushanbe	‍–‍57 kg
Silver medal – second place	2026 Ulaanbaatar	‍–‍57 kg
Silver medal – second place	2026 Lausanne	‍–‍57 kg
Bronze medal – third place	2018 Düsseldorf	‍–‍57 kg
Bronze medal – third place	2019 Düsseldorf	‍–‍57 kg
Bronze medal – third place	2022 Paris	‍–‍57 kg
Bronze medal – third place	2024 Paris	‍–‍57 kg
Bronze medal – third place	2024 Astana	‍–‍57 kg
IJF Grand Prix
Bronze medal – third place	2018 Tunis	‍–‍57 kg
World Juniors Championships
Silver medal – second place	2018 Nassau	‍–‍57 kg
European Junior Championships
Gold medal – first place	2018 Sofia	‍–‍57 kg
Bronze medal – third place	2017 Maribor	‍–‍57 kg

Profile at external databases
- IJF: 25334
- JudoInside.com: 41761
- Updated on 1 September 2026

Sarah-Léonie Cysique (born 6 July 1998 in Sarcelles) is a French judoka from Guadeloupe. She won the silver medal in the women's 57 kg event at the 2020 Summer Olympics in Tokyo, Japan. She also won the gold medal in the mixed team event.

== Career ==
She won a medal at the 2019 World Judo Championships.

In 2020, she won one of the bronze medals in the women's 57 kg event at the 2020 European Judo Championships held in Prague, Czech Republic. In 2021, she won the silver medal in her event at the 2021 Judo World Masters held in Doha, Qatar.

She represented France at the 2020 Summer Olympics.
