= Kaja Kajzer =

Slovenian judoka (born 2000)

Kaja Kajzer Žabkar
Personal information
- Born: 31 January 2000 (age 26) Ljubljana, Slovenia
- Occupation: Judoka

Sport
- Country: Slovenia
- Sport: Judo
- Weight class: ‍–‍57 kg, ‍–‍63 kg

Achievements and titles
- Olympic Games: 5th (2020)
- World Champ.: R16 (2023, 2025)
- European Champ.: (silver) (2021, 2024)
Medal record
Women's judo
Representing Slovenia
European Championships
Silver medal – second place	2021 Lisbon	‍–‍57 kg
Silver medal – second place	2024 Zagreb	‍–‍57 kg
IJF Grand Slam
Silver medal – second place	2026 Budapest	‍–‍63 kg
Bronze medal – third place	2023 Antalya	‍–‍57 kg
Bronze medal – third place	2026 Tbilisi	‍–‍63 kg
Bronze medal – third place	2026 Abu Dhabi	‍–‍63 kg
IJF Grand Prix
Gold medal – first place	2019 Perth	‍–‍57 kg
Gold medal – first place	2020 Tel Aviv	‍–‍57 kg
Gold medal – first place	2025 Linz	‍–‍63 kg
Silver medal – second place	2018 Agadir	‍–‍57 kg
Silver medal – second place	2019 Antalya	‍–‍57 kg
Silver medal – second place	2026 Zagreb	‍–‍63 kg
Bronze medal – third place	2017 Tashkent	‍–‍57 kg
Bronze medal – third place	2018 Tashkent	‍–‍57 kg
Bronze medal – third place	2021 Zagreb	‍–‍57 kg
Bronze medal – third place	2023 Zagreb	‍–‍57 kg
Bronze medal – third place	2024 Linz	‍–‍57 kg
Bronze medal – third place	2025 Lima	‍–‍63 kg
World Juniors Championships
Bronze medal – third place	2018 Nassau	‍–‍57 kg
European Cadet Championships
Bronze medal – third place	2016 Vantaa	‍–‍57 kg
European Youth Olympic Festival
Gold medal – first place	2017 Poreč	‍–‍57 kg

Profile at external databases
- IJF: 18836
- JudoInside.com: 94633
- Updated on 15 November 2026

Kaja Kajzer (born 31 January 2000) is a Slovenian judoka. She won the silver medals in the women's 57 kg event at the 2021 European Judo Championships held in Lisbon, Portugal and at the 2024 European Judo Championships held in Zagreb, Croatia.

== Career ==
Kajzer made her Olympic debut in 2021, when she competed in the women's 57 kg event at the 2020 Summer Olympic Games in Tokyo, Japan and finished in the 5th place. She also competed in the women's 57 kg event at the 2024 Summer Olympics held in Paris, France. Following the Games, she took a break from judo and focused exclusively on fitness training.

In 2025, Kajzer moved up to the 63 kg weight category and won the gold medal at the Grand Prix Linz. In the following year, she took 5th place in the women's 63 kg event at European Championships in Tbilisi, Georgia.

== Achievements ==
Year	Tournament	Place	Weight class
2016	European Cadet Championships	3rd	−57 kg
2017	European Youth Olympic Festival	1st	−57 kg
2018	World Junior Championships	3rd	−57 kg
2021	European Championships	2nd	−57 kg
2024	European Championships	2nd	−57 kg

== Personal life ==
She studied physiotherapy at Alma Mater Europaea University. In 2026 she married Rok Žabkar. They jointly own a physiotherapy clinic.
