= Eteri Liparteliani =

Georgian judoka (born 1999)

Personal information
- Native name: ეთერ ლიპარტელიანი
- Born: 23 September 1999 (age 27) Lentekhi, Georgia
- Occupation: Judoka

Sport
- Country: Georgia
- Sport: Judo
- Weight class: ‍–‍57 kg
- Club: Golden Gori
- Coached by: Kakha Motsradze

Achievements and titles
- Olympic Games: 5th (2020, 2024)
- World Champ.: (gold) (2025)
- European Champ.: (gold) (2026)
- Highest world ranking: 1^{st}
Medal record
Women's judo
Representing Georgia
World Championships
| Gold medal – first place | 2025 Budapest | ‍–‍57 kg |
| Gold medal – first place | 2025 Budapest | Mixed team |
| Silver medal – second place | 2026 Baku | ‍–‍57 kg |
| Bronze medal – third place | 2023 Doha | Mixed team |
| Bronze medal – third place | 2026 Baku | Mixed team |
European Games
| Gold medal – first place | 2023 Kraków | Mixed team |
European Championships
| Gold medal – first place | 2021 Ufa | Mixed team |
| Gold medal – first place | 2023 Kraków | Mixed team |
| Gold medal – first place | 2025 Podgorica | Mixed team |
| Gold medal – first place | 2026 Tbilisi | ‍–‍57 kg |
| Silver medal – second place | 2024 Zagreb | Mixed team |
| Silver medal – second place | 2025 Podgorica | ‍–‍57 kg |
| Bronze medal – third place | 2022 Sofia | ‍–‍57 kg |
| Bronze medal – third place | 2024 Zagreb | ‍–‍57 kg |
European Championships Open
| Gold medal – first place | 2023 Pristina | ‍–‍57 kg |
IJF Grand Slam
| Gold medal – first place | 2024 Tbilisi | ‍–‍57 kg |
| Gold medal – first place | 2025 Tbilisi | ‍–‍57 kg |
| Gold medal – first place | 2026 Lausanne | ‍–‍57 kg |
| Silver medal – second place | 2021 Tbilisi | ‍–‍57 kg |
| Silver medal – second place | 2022 Tel Aviv | ‍–‍57 kg |
| Silver medal – second place | 2023 Tashkent | ‍–‍57 kg |
| Silver medal – second place | 2023 Baku | ‍–‍57 kg |
| Bronze medal – third place | 2021 Tel Aviv | ‍–‍57 kg |
| Bronze medal – third place | 2021 Paris | ‍–‍57 kg |
| Bronze medal – third place | 2022 Tbilisi | ‍–‍57 kg |
| Bronze medal – third place | 2022 Abu Dhabi | ‍–‍57 kg |
| Bronze medal – third place | 2024 Baku | ‍–‍57 kg |
| Bronze medal – third place | 2025 Tokyo | ‍–‍57 kg |
IJF Grand Prix
| Silver medal – second place | 2022 Zagreb | ‍–‍57 kg |
| Bronze medal – third place | 2019 Zagreb | ‍–‍57 kg |
European U23 Championships
| Gold medal – first place | 2019 Izhevsk | ‍–‍57 kg |
| Bronze medal – third place | 2018 Győr | ‍–‍57 kg |
World Juniors Championships
| Gold medal – first place | 2019 Marrakesh | ‍–‍57 kg |
| Bronze medal – third place | 2019 Marrakesh | Mixed team |
European Junior Championships
| Gold medal – first place | 2019 Vantaa | ‍–‍57 kg |
| Silver medal – second place | 2018 Sofia | ‍–‍57 kg |
European Cadet Championships
| Gold medal – first place | 2016 Vantaa | ‍–‍57 kg |

Profile at external databases
- IJF: 20253
- JudoInside.com: 44789
- Updated on 6 October 2026

Eteri Liparteliani (born 23 September 1999) is a Georgian judoka.

== Career ==
Liparteliani is a two-time Olympian and competed in the women's 57 kg event at the 2020 Summer Olympics, and the women's 57 kg and mixed team event at the 2024 Summer Olympics. Liparteliani is also a World Championships bronze medalist and a three-time European champion, having won the mixed team events at the European Championships and European Games, and the women's 57 kg event at the European Championships Open in 2023. She won gold medal at the 2025 World Judo Championships in Budapest. She is the first Georgian woman to do so.

Liparteliani is the niece of Georgia's first Olympic medalist, judoka Soso Liparteliani.
