= Mina Libeer =

Belgian judoka (born 1997)

Personal information
- Born: 29 December 1997 (age 28)
- Occupation: Judoka

Sport
- Country: Belgium
- Sport: Judo
- Weight class: ‍–‍57 kg

Achievements and titles
- World Champ.: R16 (2022, 2026)
- European Champ.: (bronze) (2022)
Medal record
Women's judo
Representing Belgium
European Championships
Bronze medal – third place	2022 Sofia	‍–‍57 kg
IJF Grand Slam
Bronze medal – third place	2021 Paris	‍–‍57 kg
Bronze medal – third place	2021 Baku	‍–‍57 kg
Bronze medal – third place	2023 Tel Aviv	‍–‍57 kg
IJF Grand Prix
Bronze medal – third place	2022 Zagreb	‍–‍57 kg
Bronze medal – third place	2023 Perth	‍–‍57 kg
Bronze medal – third place	2024 Linz	‍–‍57 kg
World Juniors Championships
Bronze medal – third place	2017 Zagreb	‍–‍57 kg

Profile at external databases
- IJF: 13233
- JudoInside.com: 83966
- Updated on 6 October 2026

Mina Libeer (born 29 December 1997) is a Belgian judoka.

Libeer is a bronze medalist from the 2021 Judo Grand Slam Paris in the ‍–‍57 kg category.
