= Pauline Starke (judoka) =

German judoka (born 1997)

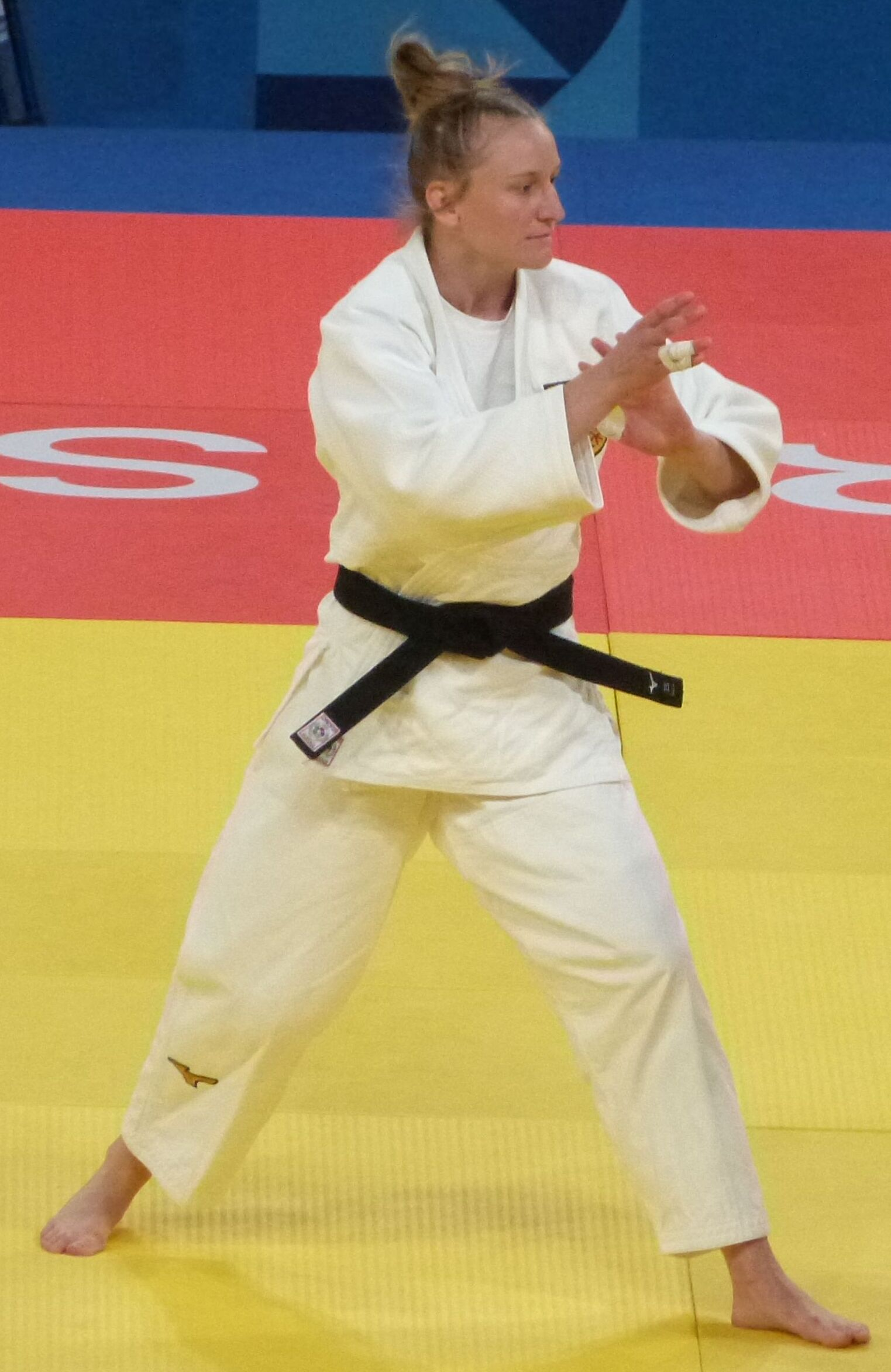

Personal information
- Born: 31 July 1997 (age 28)
- Occupation: Judoka

Sport
- Country: Germany
- Sport: Judo
- Weight class: ‍–‍57 kg

Achievements and titles
- Olympic Games: R16 (2024)
- World Champ.: R16 (2025)
- European Champ.: (bronze) (2019)
Medal record
Women's judo
Representing Germany
World Championships
Bronze medal – third place	2022 Tashkent	Mixed team
European Games
Silver medal – second place	2023 Kraków	Mixed team
Bronze medal – third place	2019 Minsk	‍–‍57 kg
European Championships
Bronze medal – third place	2025 Podgorica	Mixed team
IJF Grand Slam
Silver medal – second place	2022 Tbilisi	‍–‍57 kg
Bronze medal – third place	2021 Baku	‍–‍57 kg
Bronze medal – third place	2023 Tashkent	‍–‍57 kg
Bronze medal – third place	2024 Tashkent	‍–‍57 kg
Bronze medal – third place	2025 Astana	‍–‍57 kg
European Junior Championships
Gold medal – first place	2016 Málaga	‍–‍57 kg
European Cadet Championships
Bronze medal – third place	2014 Athens	‍–‍52 kg

Profile at external databases
- IJF: 20294
- JudoInside.com: 71088
- Updated on 15 June 2025

Pauline Starke (born 31 July 1997) is a German judoka.

Starke is a bronze medalist from the 2019 European Games in the ‍–‍57 kg category.
