= Marica Perišić =

Serbian judoka (born 2000)

Personal information
- Nickname: Mara
- Born: 25 January 2000 (age 26) Temerin, Serbia, FR Yugoslavia
- Occupation: Judoka

Sport
- Country: Serbia
- Sport: Judo
- Weight class: ‍–‍57 kg
- Club: JK RED STAR Belgrade

Achievements and titles
- Olympic Games: 7th (2024)
- World Champ.: (bronze) (2026)
- European Champ.: (silver) (2023)
Medal record
Women's judo
Representing Serbia
World Championships
| Bronze medal – third place | 2026 Baku | ‍–‍57 kg |
European Championships
| Silver medal – second place | 2023 Montpellier | ‍–‍57 kg |
| Bronze medal – third place | 2024 Zagreb | Mixed team |
IJF Grand Slam
| Gold medal – first place | 2023 Tbilisi | ‍–‍57 kg |
| Bronze medal – third place | 2021 Tashkent | ‍–‍57 kg |
| Bronze medal – third place | 2021 Kazan | ‍–‍57 kg |
| Bronze medal – third place | 2022 Abu Dhabi | ‍–‍57 kg |
| Bronze medal – third place | 2025 Baku | ‍–‍57 kg |
| Bronze medal – third place | 2025 Tbilisi | ‍–‍57 kg |
IJF Grand Prix
| Gold medal – first place | 2023 Zagreb | ‍–‍57 kg |
| Gold medal – first place | 2024 Linz | ‍–‍57 kg |
| Gold medal – first place | 2025 Zagreb | ‍–‍57 kg |
| Bronze medal – third place | 2026 Lima | ‍–‍57 kg |
European U23 Championships
| Gold medal – first place | 2022 Sarajevo | ‍–‍57 kg |
| Bronze medal – third place | 2020 Poreč | ‍–‍57 kg |
European Junior Championships
| Gold medal – first place | 2020 Poreč | ‍–‍57 kg |
| Bronze medal – third place | 2018 Sofia | ‍–‍57 kg |
European Youth Olympic Festival
| Silver medal – second place | 2017 Győr | ‍–‍57 kg |
| Bronze medal – third place | 2017 Győr | Women's team |
Mediterranean Games
| Gold medal – first place | 2022 Oran | ‍–‍57 kg |
| Silver medal – second place | 2026 Taranto | ‍–‍57 kg |

Profile at external databases
- IJF: 23209
- JudoInside.com: 95783
- Updated on 6 October 2026

Marica Perišić (Serbian Cyrillic: Марица Перишић; born 25 January 2000) is a Serbian judoka. She won the gold medal at the 2020 European Junior Championships in women's lightweight (57 kg event).

Perišić competed at the 2020 Summer Olympics in women's 57 kg event and was eliminated in the second round.

Perišić won the gold medal in the women's 57 kg event at the 2022 Mediterranean Games held in Oran, Algeria.

At the 2023 European Championships in Montpellier, she became the European vice-champion, winning the silver medal.

At the 2024 Summer Olympics, in the women's 57 kg, she reached the quarterfinals, but lost her first repechage bout for the bronze medal, finishing in seventh place.

At the 2026 World Championships, she won the bronze medal.

== Achievements ==
| Year | Tournament | Place | Weight class |
|---|---|---|---|
| 2021 | World Championships | 5th | −57 kg |
| 2021 | Grand Slam Kazan | 3rd | −57 kg |
| 2021 | Grand Slam Tashkent | 3rd | −57 kg |
| 2020 | European Championships | 5th | −57 kg |
| 2020 | European U23 Championships | 3rd | −57 kg |
| 2020 | European Junior Championships | 1st | −57 kg |
| 2018 | World Junior Championships | 5th | −57 kg |
| 2018 | European Junior Championships | 3rd | −57 kg |
| 2017 | World Cadet Championships | 5th | −57 kg |
| 2017 | European Cadet Championships | 5th | −57 kg |
| 2017 | European Youth Olympic Festival | 2nd | −57 kg |
