= Faïza Mokdar =

French judoka (born 2001)

Personal information
- Born: 16 July 2001 (age 24)
- Occupation: Judoka

Sport
- Country: France
- Sport: Judo
- Weight class: ‍–‍57 kg
- Club: Paris Saint-Germain

Achievements and titles
- World Champ.: R32 (2024)
- European Champ.: R16 (2024)
Medal record
Women's judo
Representing France
World Championships
Silver medal – second place	2024 Abu Dhabi	Mixed team
European Championships
Gold medal – first place	2022 Mulhouse	Mixed team
Gold medal – first place	2024 Zagreb	Mixed team
IJF Grand Slam
Gold medal – first place	2024 Paris	‍–‍57 kg
Gold medal – first place	2025 Astana	‍–‍57 kg
Gold medal – first place	2026 Astana	‍–‍57 kg
Bronze medal – third place	2021 Abu Dhabi	‍–‍57 kg
Bronze medal – third place	2022 Tel Aviv	‍–‍57 kg
Bronze medal – third place	2024 Antalya	‍–‍57 kg
Bronze medal – third place	2026 Paris	‍–‍57 kg
IJF Grand Prix
Gold medal – first place	2024 Zagreb	‍–‍57 kg
Gold medal – first place	2025 Lima	‍–‍57 kg
World Juniors Championships
Gold medal – first place	2021 Olbia	Mixed team
Bronze medal – third place	2021 Olbia	‍–‍57 kg
European Junior Championships
Gold medal – first place	2018 Sofia	‍–‍52 kg
Gold medal – first place	2019 Vantaa	‍–‍52 kg
Gold medal – first place	2020 Poreč	‍–‍52 kg
Gold medal – first place	2021 Luxembourg	Mixed team
Silver medal – second place	2021 Luxembourg	‍–‍57 kg
World Cadets Championships
Silver medal – second place	2017 Santiago	‍–‍52 kg
European Cadet Championships
Gold medal – first place	2018 Sarajevo	‍–‍52 kg

Profile at external databases
- IJF: 37113
- JudoInside.com: 106809
- Updated on 9 May 2026

Faïza Mokdar (born 16 July 2001) is a French judoka. She is a three time junior European champion and a one time cadet European champion.

On 12 November 2022 Mokdar won a gold medal at the 2022 European Mixed Team Judo Championships as part of team France.
