= Judo at the 2019 European Youth Summer Olympic Festival =

Judo Judo at the 2019 European Youth Summer Olympic Festival
- Venue: Heydar Aliyev Arena
- Location: Baku, Azerbaijan
- Dates: 24–27 July
- Competitors: 297 from 40 nations

Competition at external databases
- Links: IJF • JudoInside

The Judo at the 2019 European Youth Summer Olympic Festival contests were held at the Heydar Aliyev Arena, Baku, Azerbaijan, from 24 to 27 July 2019.

== Medalists ==
=== Boys ===
Event	Gold	Silver	Bronze
−50 kg	Nika Bachiashvili; Georgia	Alexandru Matei; Romania	Romain Valadier-Picard; France
−50 kg	Nika Bachiashvili; Georgia	Alexandru Matei; Romania	Mykyta Holoborodko; Ukraine
−55 kg	Berat Bahadir; Turkey	Robbe Demets; Belgium	Shukran Zamanli; Azerbaijan
−55 kg	Berat Bahadir; Turkey	Robbe Demets; Belgium	Bence Farkas; Hungary
−60 kg	Turan Bayramov; Azerbaijan	Rizvan Magomadov; Russia	Georgios Balarjishvili; Cyprus
−60 kg	Turan Bayramov; Azerbaijan	Rizvan Magomadov; Russia	Viljar Lipard; Estonia
−66 kg	Saikhan Shabikhanov; Russia	Serhii Nebotov; Ukraine	Michail Tsoutlasvili; Greece
−66 kg	Saikhan Shabikhanov; Russia	Serhii Nebotov; Ukraine	Dániel Szegedi; Hungary
−73 kg	Luigi Centracchio; Italy	Vugar Talibov; Azerbaijan	Jelle van Teijlingen; Belgium
−73 kg	Luigi Centracchio; Italy	Vugar Talibov; Azerbaijan	Aleksandar Rajčić; Serbia
−81 kg	Arnaud Aregba; France	Akaki Japaridze; Georgia	Magerram Imamverdiev; Azerbaijan
−81 kg	Arnaud Aregba; France	Akaki Japaridze; Georgia	Tymur Valieiev; Ukraine
−90 kg	Kenny Liveze; France	Daniele Accogli; Italy	Tornike Poladishvili; Georgia
−90 kg	Kenny Liveze; France	Daniele Accogli; Italy	Adam Sangariev; Russia
+90 kg	Huseyn Mammedov; Azerbaijan	Akhmed Magomadov; Russia	Mathias Anglionin; France
+90 kg	Huseyn Mammedov; Azerbaijan	Akhmed Magomadov; Russia	Giga Tatiashvili; Georgia

=== Girls ===
Event	Gold	Silver	Bronze
−40 kg	Giorgia Hagianu; Romania	Müberra Güneş; Turkey	Ghjuliana Ballo; France
−40 kg	Giorgia Hagianu; Romania	Müberra Güneş; Turkey	Paulina Ţurcan; Moldova
−44 kg	Merve Azak; Turkey	Anastasiia Balaban; Bulgaria	Gulshan Bashirova; Azerbaijan
−44 kg	Merve Azak; Turkey	Anastasiia Balaban; Bulgaria	Marina Vorobeva; Russia
−48 kg	Ana Viktorija Puljiz; Croatia	Raquel Brito; Portugal	Céline Dierickx; Belgium
−48 kg	Ana Viktorija Puljiz; Croatia	Raquel Brito; Portugal	Carlotta Avanzato; Italy
−52 kg	Elin Henninger; Netherlands	Ariane Toro; Spain	Veronica Toniolo; Italy
−52 kg	Elin Henninger; Netherlands	Ariane Toro; Spain	Alexandra Paşca; Romania
−57 kg	Özlem Yıldız; Turkey	Kseniia Galitskaia; Russia	Samira Bock; Germany
−57 kg	Özlem Yıldız; Turkey	Kseniia Galitskaia; Russia	Alexe Wagemaker; Netherlands
−63 kg	Joanne van Lieshout; Netherlands	Katarina Krišto; Croatia	Laura Vázquez; Spain
−63 kg	Joanne van Lieshout; Netherlands	Katarina Krišto; Croatia	Yuliia Kurchenko; Ukraine
−70 kg	Ai Tsunoda; Spain	Yael van Heemst; Netherlands	Juliette Diollot; France
−70 kg	Ai Tsunoda; Spain	Yael van Heemst; Netherlands	Anna Monta Olek; Germany
+70 kg	Hilal Öztürk; Turkey	Carmen Dijkstra; Netherlands	Gvantsa Somkhishvili; Georgia
+70 kg	Hilal Öztürk; Turkey	Carmen Dijkstra; Netherlands	Erica Simonetti; Italy

=== Mixed ===
Event	Gold	Silver	Bronze
Team	Turkey; Habibe Afyonlu; Merve Azak; Berat Bahadir; Muhammed Demirel; Cem Ata Demirtaş; Sıla Ersin; Münir Ertuğ; Hilal Öztürk; Musa Şimşek; Hatice Vandemir; Özlem Yıldız	Russia; Sofia Afanaseva; Kseniia Galitskaia; Akhmed Magomadov; Rizvan Magomadov; Sergei Mastriukov; Liubov Orlova; Elizaveta Postnikova; Adam Sangariev; Saikhan Shabikhanov; Marina Vorobeva; Gleb Zamkovoi	Germany; Kevin Abeltshauser; Samira Bock; Viktoria Folger; David Ickes; Nicolas Kunze; Tim Möller; Anna Monta Olek; Daniel Udsilauri; George Udsilauri; Jule Ziegler
Team	Turkey; Habibe Afyonlu; Merve Azak; Berat Bahadir; Muhammed Demirel; Cem Ata Demirtaş; Sıla Ersin; Münir Ertuğ; Hilal Öztürk; Musa Şimşek; Hatice Vandemir; Özlem Yıldız	Russia; Sofia Afanaseva; Kseniia Galitskaia; Akhmed Magomadov; Rizvan Magomadov; Sergei Mastriukov; Liubov Orlova; Elizaveta Postnikova; Adam Sangariev; Saikhan Shabikhanov; Marina Vorobeva; Gleb Zamkovoi	Hungary; Bence Farkas; Szilvia Farkas; Attila Ijjas; Anna Kriza; Bálint Marosi; Nikolett Nyíri; Péter Sáfrány; Dániel Szegedi

== Medal table ==
* Host nation (Azerbaijan)

Rank	Nation	Gold	Silver	Bronze	Total
1	Turkey (TUR)	5	1	0	6
2	Netherlands (NED)	2	2	2	6
3	Azerbaijan (AZE)*	2	1	3	6
4	France (FRA)	2	0	4	6
5	Russia (RUS)	1	4	2	7
6	Georgia (GEO)	1	1	3	5
6	Italy (ITA)	1	1	3	5
8	Romania (ROU)	1	1	1	3
8	Spain (ESP)	1	1	1	3
10	Croatia (CRO)	1	1	0	2
11	Ukraine (UKR)	0	1	3	4
12	Belgium (BEL)	0	1	1	2
13	Bulgaria (BUL)	0	1	0	1
13	Portugal (POR)	0	1	0	1
15	Germany (GER)	0	0	3	3
15	Hungary (HUN)	0	0	3	3
17	Cyprus (CYP)	0	0	1	1
17	Estonia (EST)	0	0	1	1
17	Greece (GRE)	0	0	1	1
17	Moldova (MDA)	0	0	1	1
17	Serbia (SRB)	0	0	1	1
Totals (21 entries)		17	17	34	68

== Participating nations ==
A total of 297 athletes from 40 nations competed in judo at the 2019 European Youth Summer Olympic Festival:

- Albania (1)
- Austria (8)
- Azerbaijan (12)
- Belarus (12)
- Belgium (6)
- Bosnia and Herzegovina (5)
- Bulgaria (6)
- Croatia (5)
- Cyprus (2)
- Czech Republic (7)
- Denmark (3)
- Estonia (6)
- Faroe Islands (1)
- Finland (3)
- France (12)
- Georgia (12)
- Germany (11)
- Great Britain (10)
- Greece (6)
- Hungary (8)
- Israel (9)
- Italy (12)
- Kosovo (3)
- Latvia (8)
- Lithuania (6)
- Moldova (7)
- Netherlands (12)
- Norway (1)
- Poland (12)
- Portugal (8)
- Romania (12)
- Russia (12)
- Serbia (5)
- Slovakia (6)
- Slovenia (10)
- Spain (8)
- Sweden (4)
- Switzerland (4)
- Turkey (12)
- Ukraine (10)
