= Coralie Hayme =

French judoka (born 2001)

Personal information
- Born: 26 January 2001 (age 25)
- Occupation: Judoka

Sport
- Country: France
- Sport: Judo
- Weight class: +78 kg
Medal record
Women's judo
Representing France
World Championships
Silver medal – second place	2023 Doha	Mixed team
Silver medal – second place	2024 Abu Dhabi	Mixed team
World Masters
Silver medal – second place	2022 Jerusalem	+78 kg
IJF Grand Slam
Gold medal – first place	2024 Abu Dhabi	+78 kg
Silver medal – second place	2024 Tbilisi	+78 kg
Bronze medal – third place	2021 Paris	+78 kg
Bronze medal – third place	2021 Abu Dhabi	+78 kg
IJF Grand Prix
Gold medal – first place	2024 Zagreb	+78 kg
Bronze medal – third place	2024 Odivelas	+78 kg
World Juniors Championships
Gold medal – first place	2021 Olbia	+78 kg
Gold medal – first place	2021 Olbia	Mixed team
European Junior Championships
Gold medal – first place	2021 Luxembourg	Mixed team
Silver medal – second place	2021 Luxembourg	+78 kg
Mediterranean Games
Bronze medal – third place	2022 Oran	+78 kg

Profile at external databases
- IJF: 43577
- JudoInside.com: 117375
- Updated on 14 October 2024

Coralie Hayme (born 26 January 2001) is a French judoka.

Hayme is the bronze medallist of the 2021 Judo Grand Slam Abu Dhabi in the +78 kg category.

Hayme won one of the bronze medals in the women's +78 kg event at the 2022 Mediterranean Games held in Oran, Algeria.
