= Hilal Öztürk =

Turkish judoka (born 2002)

Personal information
- Born: 21 February 2002 (age 24)
- Occupation: Judoka

Sport
- Country: Turkey
- Sport: Judo
- Weight class: +78 kg

Achievements and titles
- World Champ.: (bronze) (2024)
- European Champ.: 5th (2024)
Medal record
Women's judo
Representing Turkey
World Championships
| Bronze medal – third place | 2024 Abu Dhabi | +78 kg |
IJF Grand Slam
| Silver medal – second place | 2025 Baku | +78 kg |
| Bronze medal – third place | 2022 Baku | +78 kg |
| Bronze medal – third place | 2023 Tashkent | +78 kg |
| Bronze medal – third place | 2023 Antalya | +78 kg |
| Bronze medal – third place | 2024 Antalya | +78 kg |
IJF Grand Prix
| Gold medal – first place | 2024 Odivelas | +78 kg |
| Bronze medal – third place | 2023 Zagreb | +78 kg |
Mediterranean Games
| Bronze medal – third place | 2026 Taranto | Mixed team |
Islamic Solidarity Games
| Gold medal – first place | 2025 Riyadh | +78 kg |
| Bronze medal – third place | 2025 Riyadh | Mixed team |
European U23 Championships
| Gold medal – first place | 2022 Sarajevo | +78 kg |
| Bronze medal – third place | 2021 Budapest | +78 kg |
World Juniors Championships
| Silver medal – second place | 2022 Guayaquil | +78 kg |
| Bronze medal – third place | 2021 Olbia | +78 kg |
European Junior Championships
| Gold medal – first place | 2022 Prague | +78 kg |
| Bronze medal – third place | 2021 Luxembourg | +78 kg |
World Cadets Championships
| Bronze medal – third place | 2019 Almaty | +70 kg |
European Cadet Championships
| Bronze medal – third place | 2019 Warsaw | +70 kg |

Profile at external databases
- IJF: 36901
- JudoInside.com: 113249
- Updated on 16 February 2025

Hilal Öztürk (born 21 February 2002) is a Turkish judoka. She won a bronze medal at the 2022 Judo Grand Slam Baku.

Öztürk won a bronze medal at the 2021 European U23 Judo Championships in Budapest and a silver medal at the 2022 World Judo Juniors Championships in Guayaquil.
