= Muhammed Demirel =

Turkish judoka (born 2002)

Personal information
- Full name: Muhammed Ali Demirel
- Born: 8 November 2002 (age 23) Istanbul, Turkey
- Occupation: Judoka

Sport
- Country: Turkey
- Sport: Judo
- Weight class: ‍–‍66 kg
- Club: Kocaeli BB Kağıt SC

Achievements and titles
- Olympic Games: R32 (2024)
- World Champ.: R32 (2023, 2024, 2025)
- European Champ.: (silver) (2024)
Medal record
Men's judo
Representing Turkey
European Championships
Silver medal – second place	2024 Zagreb	‍–‍66 kg
Islamic Solidarity Games
Bronze medal – third place	2025 Riyadh	Mixed team
World Juniors Championships
Silver medal – second place	2022 Guayaquil	Mixed team
Bronze medal – third place	2021 Olbia	Mixed team
Bronze medal – third place	2022 Guayaquil	‍–‍66 kg
European Junior Championships
Gold medal – first place	2022 Prague	‍–‍66 kg
World Cadets Championships
Bronze medal – third place	2019 Almaty	Mixed team
European Cadet Championships
Gold medal – first place	2019 Warsaw	Mixed team
Silver medal – second place	2019 Warsaw	‍–‍60 kg
Bronze medal – third place	2018 Sarajevo	‍–‍50 kg
European Youth Olympic Festival
Gold medal – first place	2019 Baku	Mixed team

Profile at external databases
- IJF: 37005
- JudoInside.com: 113114
- Updated on 12 August 2024

Muhammed Ali Demirel (born 8 November 2002) is a Turkish Olympian judoka who competes in the ‍–‍66 kg event.

== Sport career ==
Demirel is a member of Kocaeli BB Kağıt SC.

=== 2018 ===
Demirel became 2018 Turkish Cadet champion in 50 kg in Mersin.

He took the bronze medal in the ‍–‍50 kg event at the 2018 European Cadet Championships in Sarajevo, Bosnia and Herzegovina.

=== 2019 ===
In 2019, he became second time Turkish Cadet champion in 60 kg in Samsun.

He and his three teammates became champion in the Mixed team event at the 2019 European Cadet Championships in Warsaw, Poland.

He won the silver medal in the ‍–‍60 kg event at the same competition.

Demirel and his nine teammates captured the gold medal in the Mixed team event at the Judo at the 2019 European Youth Summer Olympic Festival in Baku, Azerbaijan. He competed in the 60 kg event, and lost the bronze-medal match placing fifth.

=== 2021 ===
He became 2021 Turkish champion in 66 kg.

He took the bronze medal in the Mixed team event with nine teammates at the [2021 World Juniors Championships in Olbia, Italy.

=== 2022 ===
Demirel captured the gold medal in the ‍–‍66 kg event at the 2022 European Junior Championship in Prague, Czech Republic.

=== 2023 ===
He lost the Round of 32 match to Alberto Gaitero from Spain after defeating American Ari Berliner, and was eliminated at the 2023 World Championships in Doha, Qatar.

=== 2024 ===
He lost the Round of 32 to Uzbek Sardor Nurillaev at the 2024 World Championships in Abu Dhabi, United Arab Emirates.

At the 2024 European Championships in Zagreb, Croatia, he won the silver medal.

Demirel received a quota to represent his country at the 2024 Summer Olympics in Paris, France according to the Olympic rankings developed by the International Judo Federation. He lost the First round match against Luukas Saha from Finland, and was eliminated.

== Personal life ==
Muhammed Ali Demirel was born on 8 November 2002. He is of Caucasusian Chechen descent.
