= Özlem Yıldız =

Turkish judoka (born 2003)

Personal information
- Born: 5 August 2003 (age 23) Iğdır, Turkey
- Occupation: Judoka

Sport
- Country: Turkey
- Sport: Judo
- Weight class: ‍–‍57 kg, ‍–‍63 kg
- Club: Galatasaray Judo

Achievements and titles
- World Champ.: R64 (2022, 2024)
- European Champ.: R32 (2024)
Medal record
Women's judo
Representing Turkey
World Juniors Championships
| Gold medal – first place | 2022 Guayaquil | ‍–‍57 kg |
| Bronze medal – third place | 2021 Olbia | ‍–‍57 kg |
European Junior Championships
| Bronze medal – third place | 2020 Poreč | ‍–‍57 kg |
| Bronze medal – third place | 2021 Luxembourg | ‍–‍57 kg |
| Bronze medal – third place | 2022 Prague | ‍–‍57 kg |
European Cadet Championships
| Gold medal – first place | 2019 Warsaw | ‍–‍57 kg |
European Youth Olympic Festival
| Gold medal – first place | 2019 Baku | ‍–‍57 kg |
| Gold medal – first place | 2019 Baku | Mixed team |
Mediterranean Games
| Bronze medal – third place | 2026 Taranto | Mixed team |

Profile at external databases
- IJF: 46268
- JudoInside.com: 123002
- Updated on 1 October 2026

Özlem Yıldız (born 5 August 2003) is a Turkish female judoka competing in the half-middleweight (–63 kg) division. She is a member of Galatasaray Judo, and represents Turkey at international competitions.

== Sport career ==
Yıldız captured gold medals in the lightweight (–57 kg) division at the 2019 European Cadet Championships in Warsaw, Poland, and at the 2019 European Youth Summer Olympic Festival in Baku, Azerbaijan.

At the 2020 European Junior Championships in Poreč, Croatia, she became bronze medalist in the –57 kg event.

She won a bronze medaş in the –57 kg event at the 2020 European Junior Championships in Poreč, Croatia.

In 2021, she took a bronze medal in the –57 kg, and the silver medal in the mixed team event at the European Junior Championships in Luxembourg City, Luxembourg. She won bronze medals in the , and in the mixed team event at the World Juniors Championships in Olbia, Italy. She was part of the mixed team, which won the bronze medal at the European Mixed Team Championships in Ufa, Bashkortostan, Russia.

She captured the gold medal in the –57 kg, and the silver medal in the mixed team event at the 2022 World Juniors Championships in Guayaquil, Ecuador. At the 2022 European Junior Championships in Prague, Czech Republic, she became bronze medalist in the –57 kg, and silver medal in the mixed team event.

As part of the mixed judo team of Turkey, she won the bronze medal in the mixed team event at the 2026 Mediterranean Games in Taranto, Italy.

== Perrsonal life ==
Born on 5 August 2003, Özlem Yıldız is a native of Iğdır, eastern Turkey.
