= Richárd Sipőcz =

Hungarian judoka (born 2001)

Personal information
- Nationality: Hungarian
- Born: 12 March 2001 (age 25)
- Occupation: Judoka

Sport
- Country: Hungary
- Sport: Judo
- Weight class: +100 kg

Achievements and titles
- World Champ.: R16 (2021, 2023)
- European Champ.: 5th (2022, 2023)
Medal record
Men's judo
Representing Hungary
IJF Grand Slam
Bronze medal – third place	2022 Baku	+100 kg
IJF Grand Prix
Bronze medal – third place	2019 Budapest	+100 kg
Bronze medal – third place	2022 Almada	+100 kg
European U23 Championships
Gold medal – first place	2019 Izhevsk	+100 kg
Gold medal – first place	2020 Poreč	+100 kg
Gold medal – first place	2022 Sarajevo	+100 kg
Silver medal – second place	2021 Budapest	+100 kg
World Juniors Championships
Silver medal – second place	2021 Olbia	+100 kg
Bronze medal – third place	2019 Marrakesh	+100 kg
European Junior Championships
Gold medal – first place	2020 Poreč	+100 kg
Gold medal – first place	2021 Luxembourg	+100 kg
Bronze medal – third place	2019 Vantaa	+100 kg
European Cadet Championships
Gold medal – first place	2016 Vantaa	+90 kg
Gold medal – first place	2018 Sarajevo	+90 kg
Silver medal – second place	2017 Kaunas	+90 kg
European Youth Olympic Festival
Gold medal – first place	2017 Poreč	+90 kg
Bronze medal – third place	2017 Poreč	Men's team

Profile at external databases
- IJF: 29135
- JudoInside.com: 97515
- Updated on 6 November 2023

Richárd Sipőcz (born 12 March 2001) is a Hungarian judoka.
