= Ana Viktorija Puljiz =

Croatian judoka (born 2002)

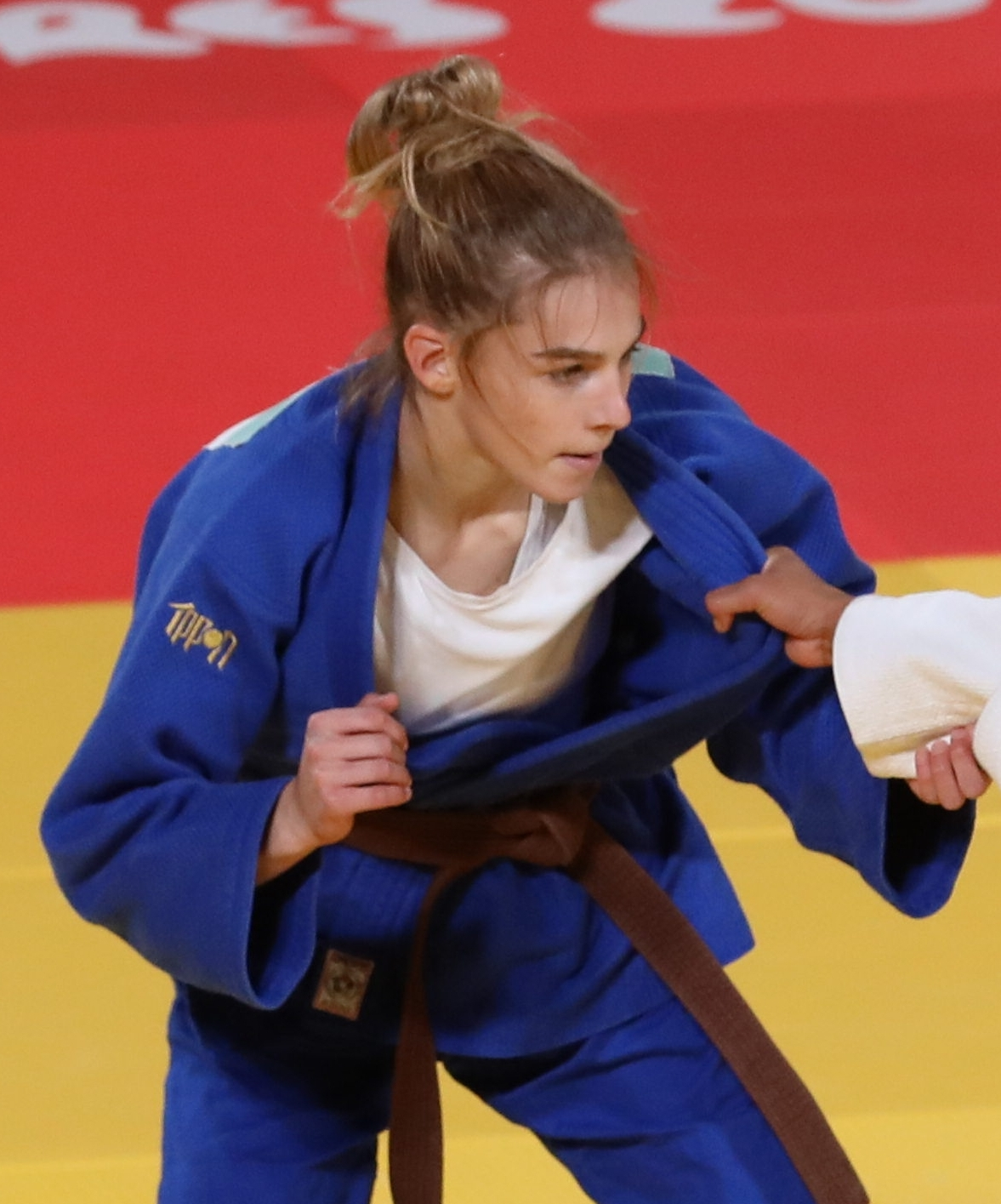
- Puljiz in 2018

Personal information
- Born: 1 January 2002 (age 24)
- Occupation: Judoka

Sport
- Country: Croatia
- Sport: Judo
- Weight class: ‍–‍52 kg, ‍–‍57 kg

Achievements and titles
- World Champ.: (bronze) (2026)
- European Champ.: (bronze) (2022)
Medal record
Women's judo
Representing Croatia
World Championships
| Bronze medal – third place | 2026 Baku | ‍–‍57 kg |
European Championships
| Bronze medal – third place | 2022 Sofia | ‍–‍52 kg |
IJF Grand Slam
| Silver medal – second place | 2024 Tbilisi | ‍–‍52 kg |
| Silver medal – second place | 2025 Ulaanbaatar | ‍–‍57 kg |
| Bronze medal – third place | 2024 Antalya | ‍–‍52 kg |
| Bronze medal – third place | 2025 Dushanbe | ‍–‍57 kg |
| Bronze medal – third place | 2026 Tashkent | ‍–‍57 kg |
| Bronze medal – third place | 2026 Abu Dhabi | ‍–‍57 kg |
IJF Grand Prix
| Silver medal – second place | 2022 Almada | ‍–‍52 kg |
| Silver medal – second place | 2024 Zagreb | ‍–‍57 kg |
| Silver medal – second place | 2025 Zagreb | ‍–‍57 kg |
| Bronze medal – third place | 2021 Zagreb | ‍–‍52 kg |
European U23 Championships
| Gold medal – first place | 2021 Budapest | ‍–‍52 kg |
| Bronze medal – third place | 2023 Potsdam | ‍–‍52 kg |
European Junior Championships
| Silver medal – second place | 2018 Sofia | ‍–‍44 kg |
| Bronze medal – third place | 2020 Poreč | ‍–‍52 kg |
| Bronze medal – third place | 2021 Luxembourg | ‍–‍52 kg |
World Cadets Championships
| Silver medal – second place | 2019 Almaty | ‍–‍48 kg |
European Cadet Championships
| Gold medal – first place | 2017 Kaunas | ‍–‍44 kg |
| Silver medal – second place | 2018 Sarajevo | ‍–‍44 kg |
| Bronze medal – third place | 2019 Warsaw | ‍–‍48 kg |
European Youth Olympic Festival
| Gold medal – first place | 2019 Baku | ‍–‍48 kg |
Youth Olympic Games
| Gold medal – first place | 2018 Buenos Aires | Mixed team |
| Bronze medal – third place | 2018 Buenos Aires | ‍–‍44 kg |
Mediterranean Games
| Gold medal – first place | 2026 Taranto | ‍–‍57 kg |
| Silver medal – second place | 2022 Oran | ‍–‍52 kg |

Profile at external databases
- IJF: 36228
- JudoInside.com: 103658
- Updated on 29 October 2026

Ana Viktorija Puljiz (born 1 January 2002) is a Croatian judoka.

== Career ==
Puljiz represented Croatia at the 2018 Summer Youth Olympics and won a gold medal in the mixed team event and a bronze medal in the –‍44 kg category. In June 2019, she competed at the 2019 European Cadet Judo Championships and won a bronze medal in the −48 kg category. The next month she competed at the 2019 European Youth Summer Olympic Festival and won a gold medal in the −48 kg category. In September 2019, she competed at the 2019 World Judo Cadets Championships and won a silver medal in the −48 kg category. She was subsequently awarded the 2019 Dražen Petrović Award.

In June 2022, she competed at the 2022 Mediterranean Games and won a silver medal in the –‍52 kg category. In August 2026, she again competed at the 2026 Mediterranean Games and won a gold medal in the –‍57 kg category.
