= Ai Tsunoda =

Spanish judoka (born 2002)

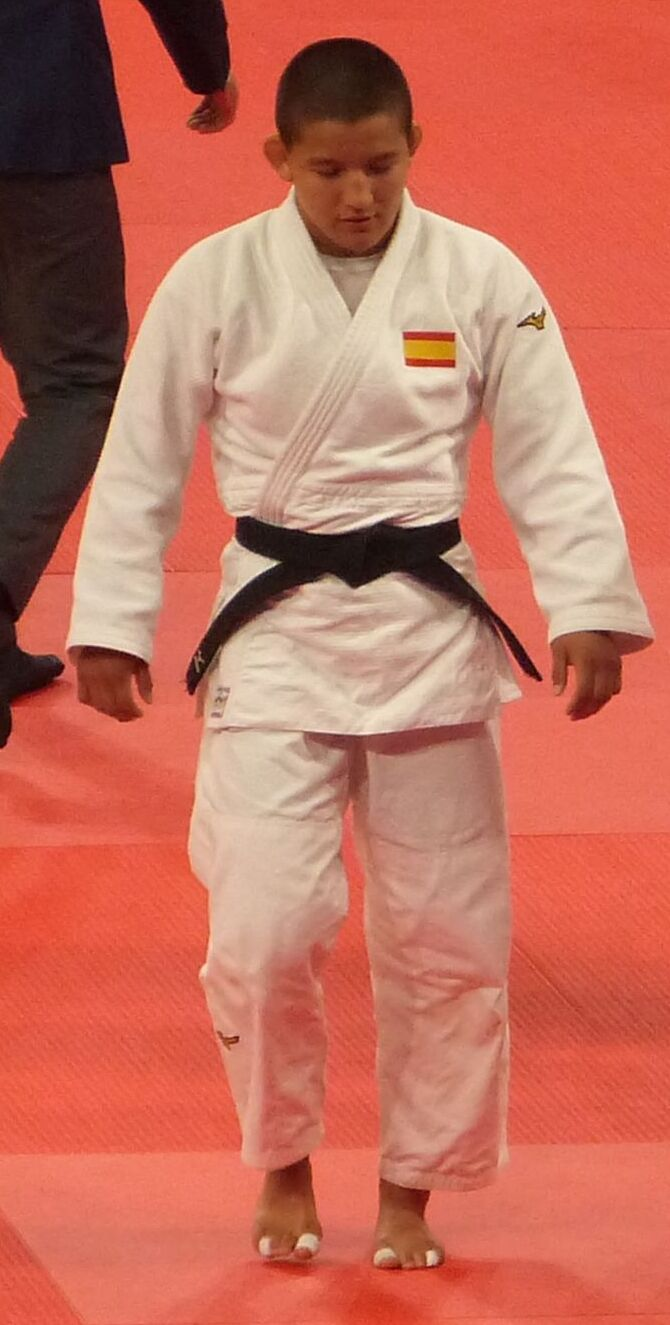

Personal information
- Full name: Ai Tsunoda Roustant
- Born: 19 April 2002 (age 24) Lleida, Catalonia, Spain
- Occupation: Judoka

Sport
- Country: Spain
- Sport: Judo
- Weight class: ‍–‍70 kg

Achievements and titles
- Olympic Games: 5th (2024)
- World Champ.: (gold) (2026)
- European Champ.: (bronze) (2024)
Medal record
Women's judo
Representing Spain
World Championships
Gold medal – first place	2026 Baku	‍–‍70 kg
European Championships
Bronze medal – third place	2024 Zagreb	‍–‍70 kg
IJF Grand Slam
Gold medal – first place	2023 Paris	‍–‍70 kg
Gold medal – first place	2025 Paris	‍–‍70 kg
Silver medal – second place	2022 Tbilisi	‍–‍70 kg
Silver medal – second place	2023 Baku	‍–‍70 kg
Bronze medal – third place	2022 Tokyo	‍–‍70 kg
Bronze medal – third place	2023 Antalya	‍–‍70 kg
Bronze medal – third place	2023 Tokyo	‍–‍70 kg
Bronze medal – third place	2024 Antalya	‍–‍70 kg
Bronze medal – third place	2025 Tokyo	‍–‍70 kg
Bronze medal – third place	2026 Paris	‍–‍70 kg
IJF Grand Prix
Bronze medal – third place	2020 Tel Aviv	‍–‍70 kg
Bronze medal – third place	2022 Almada	‍–‍70 kg
World Juniors Championships
Gold medal – first place	2021 Olbia	‍–‍70 kg
Gold medal – first place	2022 Guayaquil	‍–‍70 kg
European Junior Championships
Gold medal – first place	2022 Prague	‍–‍70 kg
Silver medal – second place	2019 Vantaa	‍–‍70 kg
Bronze medal – third place	2020 Poreč	‍–‍70 kg
Bronze medal – third place	2021 Luxembourg	‍–‍70 kg
World Cadets Championships
Gold medal – first place	2019 Almaty	‍–‍70 kg
European Cadet Championships
Gold medal – first place	2019 Warsaw	‍–‍70 kg

Profile at external databases
- IJF: 51204
- JudoInside.com: 117449
- Updated on 8 October 2026

Ai Tsunoda Roustant (born 19 April 2002) is a Spanish judoka. She competed at the 2024 Summer Olympics. Tsunoda earned a gold medal at the 2026 World Judo Championships.

== Early life ==
Tsunoda was born in the Catalan city of Lleida, Spain, to Japanese father, Go Tsunoda, and a French mother, Céline Roustant, who both practised judoka. She studies at Tokai University.

== Career ==
=== Junior career: Double World Champion ===
Tsunoda became cadet world champion in Almaty in 2019. In January 2020, Tsunoda won a bronze medal at Grand Prix Tel Aviv.

In the following seasons, she won both the 2021 and 2022 World Judo Juniors Championships in the 70kg category.

=== 2023 ===
Stepping into the senior ranks, Tsunoda was on the podium numerous times in 2023. She won the 70kg category at Grand Slam Paris in February. She got a bronze medal at Grand Slam Antalya in April. She later became a silver medalist at Grand Slam Baku in September. She finished that season with a bronze medal at the Grand Slam Tokyo in December.

=== 2024 ===
In March, Tsunoda earned a bronze medal at Grand Slam edition in Antalya. In May, she was again a bronze medalist at the European Championships in the Women's 70 kg event.

Tsunoda was selected for the 2024 Summer Olympics in the Women's 70 kg, placing fifth overall.

=== 2025-present ===
Tsunoda won the 2025 Judo Grand Slam Paris and placed fifth at the 2025 World Judo Championships.

Tsunoda contested her first senior world final in the -70kg at the 2026 World Judo Championships in Baku in October 2026, defeating Michaela Polleres to claim her first senior world championship title. In doing so, she became Spain’s first female world judo champion since Isabel Fernández in 1997.
