= Romain Valadier-Picard =

French judoka (born 2002)

Personal information
- Born: 20 July 2002 (age 23)
- Occupation: Judoka

Sport
- Country: France
- Sport: Judo
- Weight class: ‍–‍60 kg

Achievements and titles
- World Champ.: (silver) (2025)
- European Champ.: (bronze) (2023)
Medal record
Men's judo
Representing France
World Championships
Silver medal – second place	2025 Budapest	‍–‍60 kg
European Championships
Bronze medal – third place	2023 Montpellier	‍–‍60 kg
IJF Grand Slam
Gold medal – first place	2025 Paris	‍–‍60 kg
Silver medal – second place	2023 Ulaanbaatar	‍–‍60 kg
Bronze medal – third place	2021 Paris	‍–‍60 kg
Bronze medal – third place	2022 Budapest	‍–‍60 kg
Bronze medal – third place	2023 Baku	‍–‍60 kg
Bronze medal – third place	2024 Tashkent	‍–‍60 kg
IJF Grand Prix
Gold medal – first place	2023 Linz	‍–‍60 kg
Gold medal – first place	2026 Linz	‍–‍60 kg
Silver medal – second place	2025 Zagreb	‍–‍60 kg
World Juniors Championships
Bronze medal – third place	2021 Olbia	‍–‍60 kg
Bronze medal – third place	2022 Guayaquil	‍–‍60 kg
European Junior Championships
Gold medal – first place	2021 Luxembourg	‍–‍60 kg
Bronze medal – third place	2020 Poreč	‍–‍60 kg
World Cadets Championships
Silver medal – second place	2019 Almaty	‍–‍50 kg
European Cadet Championships
Gold medal – first place	2019 Warsaw	‍–‍50 kg

Profile at external databases
- IJF: 43659
- JudoInside.com: 111133
- Updated on 8 March 2026

Romain Valadier-Picard (born 20 July 2002) is a French judoka. He won a Silver medal in the men's 60 kg event at the Budapest 2025 World Judo Championships.

== Career ==
Romain Valadier-Picard was the French Junior Champion in 2020 in the under 55 kg category.

He won a gold medal at the 2019 Cadet European Championships in Warsaw in the under 50 kg category and a silver medal at the 2019 Cadet World Championships in Almaty in the under 50 kg category. In the under 60 kg category, he won a bronze medal at the 2020 Junior European Championships in Porec, the 2021 Junior European Champion in Luxembourg, and a bronze medal at the 2021 and 2022 Junior World Championships in Guayaquil.

He won the bronze medal in the under 60 kg category at the 2023 European Judo Championships in Montpellier.
