= Anna Monta Olek =

German judoka (born 2002)

Personal information
- Born: 21 August 2002 (age 24)
- Occupation: Judoka
- Website: www.anna-monta-olek.de

Sport
- Country: Germany
- Sport: Judo
- Weight class: ‍–‍78 kg

Achievements and titles
- World Champ.: (silver) (2025)
- European Champ.: (silver) (2025)
- Highest world ranking: 1^{st}
Medal record
Women's judo
Representing Germany
World Championships
Silver medal – second place	2025 Budapest	‍–‍78 kg
Bronze medal – third place	2026 Baku	‍–‍78 kg
European Championships
Silver medal – second place	2025 Podgorica	‍–‍78 kg
Bronze medal – third place	2025 Podgorica	Mixed team
IJF Grand Slam
Gold medal – first place	2024 Abu Dhabi	‍–‍78 kg
Gold medal – first place	2025 Baku	‍–‍78 kg
Gold medal – first place	2025 Abu Dhabi	‍–‍78 kg
Gold medal – first place	2026 Astana	‍–‍78 kg
Gold medal – first place	2026 Lausanne	‍–‍78 kg
Silver medal – second place	2024 Astana	‍–‍78 kg
Silver medal – second place	2026 Tashkent	‍–‍78 kg
Bronze medal – third place	2022 Abu Dhabi	‍–‍78 kg
Bronze medal – third place	2024 Baku	‍–‍78 kg
Bronze medal – third place	2025 Tashkent	‍–‍78 kg
Bronze medal – third place	2026 Paris	‍–‍78 kg
IJF Grand Prix
Gold medal – first place	2022 Perth	‍–‍78 kg
Gold medal – first place	2023 Dushanbe	‍–‍78 kg
Gold medal – first place	2024 Odivelas	‍–‍78 kg
Gold medal – first place	2024 Linz	‍–‍78 kg
Gold medal – first place	2026 Qingdao	‍–‍78 kg
European U23 Championships
Bronze medal – third place	2024 Piła	Mixed team
World Juniors Championships
Gold medal – first place	2021 Olbia	‍–‍78 kg
Bronze medal – third place	2021 Olbia	Mixed team
Bronze medal – third place	2022 Guayaquil	Mixed team
European Junior Championships
Gold medal – first place	2021 Luxembourg	‍–‍78 kg
World University Games
Gold medal – first place	2025 Essen	‍–‍78 kg
European Youth Olympic Festival
Bronze medal – third place	2019 Baku	‍–‍70 kg
Bronze medal – third place	2019 Baku	Mixed team

Profile at external databases
- IJF: 42127
- JudoInside.com: 113001
- Updated on 9 October 2026

Anna Monta Olek (born 21 August 2002) is a German judoka. She earned a silver and bronze medals at the World Judo Championships.

Olek is also a five-time gold medalist at the IJF Grand Slam tournaments.
