= 2021 European Junior Judo Championships =

Judo competition

Judo 2021 European Junior Judo Championships
- Venue: Coque
- Location: Luxembourg City, Luxembourg
- Dates: 9–12 September 2021
- Competitors: 351 from 43 nations

Champions
- Mixed team: France (1st title)

Competition at external databases
- Links: IJF • JudoInside

The 2021 European Junior Judo Championships was an edition of the European U21 Judo Championships, organised by the European Judo Union. It was held in Coque in Luxembourg City, Luxembourg from 9–12 September 2021. The final day of competition featured a mixed team event, won by team France.

== Event videos ==
The event aired freely on the European Judo Union YouTube channel.

	Weight classes	Preliminaries			Final Block	
Day 1	Men: -60, -66 Women: -48, -52, -57	Commentated			Commentated	
Day 1	Men: -60, -66 Women: -48, -52, -57	Tatami 1	Tatami 2	Tatami 3	Tatami 2	Tatami 3
Day 2	Men: -73, -81 Women: -63, -70	Commentated			Commentated	
Day 2	Men: -73, -81 Women: -63, -70	Tatami 1	Tatami 2	Tatami 3	Tatami 2	Tatami 3
Day 3	Men: -90, -100, +100 Women: -78, +78	Commentated			Commentated	
Day 3	Men: -90, -100, +100 Women: -78, +78	Tatami 1	Tatami 2	Tatami 3	Tatami 2	Tatami 3
Day 4	Mixed team	Commentated			Commentated	
Day 4	Mixed team	Tatami 1	Tatami 2	Tatami 3	Tatami 2	Tatami 3

== Medal overview ==
=== Men ===
Event	Gold	Silver	Bronze
−60 kg	(France) Romain Valadier-Picard	(Georgia (country)) Giorgi Sardalashvili	(Israel) Matan Kokolayev
−60 kg	(France) Romain Valadier-Picard	(Georgia (country)) Giorgi Sardalashvili	(Ukraine) Oleh Veredyba
−66 kg	(France) Maxime Gobert	(Russia) Kantemir Kodzov	(Ukraine) Vladyslav Kazimirov
−66 kg	(France) Maxime Gobert	(Russia) Kantemir Kodzov	(Ukraine) Yevhen Honcharko
−73 kg	(Romania) Adrian Şulcă	(Slovenia) Juš Mecilošek	(Italy) Vincenzo Pelligra
−73 kg	(Romania) Adrian Şulcă	(Slovenia) Juš Mecilošek	(Spain) Javier Peña
−81 kg	(Russia) Ibragimgadzhi Suleimanov	(France) Arnaud Aregba	(Russia) Daniil Dranovskii
−81 kg	(Russia) Ibragimgadzhi Suleimanov	(France) Arnaud Aregba	(Czech Republic) Adam Kopecký
−90 kg	(Georgia (country)) Nika Kharazishvili	(Netherlands) Tigo Renes	(Hungary) Péter Sáfrány
−90 kg	(Georgia (country)) Nika Kharazishvili	(Netherlands) Tigo Renes	(Georgia (country)) Tornike Poladishvili
−100 kg	(Russia) Matvey Kanikovskiy	(Hungary) Zsombor Vég	(Poland) Michał Jędrzejewski
−100 kg	(Russia) Matvey Kanikovskiy	(Hungary) Zsombor Vég	(Georgia (country)) Ilia Sulamanidze
+100 kg	(Hungary) Richárd Sipőcz	(Georgia (country)) Saba Inaneishvili	(Germany) Losseni Kone
+100 kg	(Hungary) Richárd Sipőcz	(Georgia (country)) Saba Inaneishvili	(Poland) Wojciech Kordyalik

=== Women ===
Event	Gold	Silver	Bronze
−48 kg	(Russia) Irena Khubulova	(Azerbaijan) Aydan Valiyeva	(France) Léa Beres
−48 kg	(Russia) Irena Khubulova	(Azerbaijan) Aydan Valiyeva	(Italy) Assunta Scutto
−52 kg	(Russia) Liliia Nugaeva	(France) Chloé Devictor	(Kosovo) Erza Muminoviq
−52 kg	(Russia) Liliia Nugaeva	(France) Chloé Devictor	(Croatia) Ana Viktorija Puljiz
−57 kg	(Israel) Kerem Primo	(France) Faïza Mokdar	(Austria) Lisa Grabner
−57 kg	(Israel) Kerem Primo	(France) Faïza Mokdar	(Turkey) Özlem Yıldız
−63 kg	(Croatia) Katarina Krišto	(Hungary) Brigitta Varga	(Italy) Sara Lisciani
−63 kg	(Croatia) Katarina Krišto	(Hungary) Brigitta Varga	(Netherlands) Joanne van Lieshout
−70 kg	(Ukraine) Nataliia Chystiakova	(Croatia) Lara Cvjetko	(Spain) Ai Tsunoda
−70 kg	(Ukraine) Nataliia Chystiakova	(Croatia) Lara Cvjetko	(Portugal) Joana Crisóstomo
−78 kg	(Germany) Anna Monta Olek	(Netherlands) Yael van Heemst	(Germany) Raffaela Igl
−78 kg	(Germany) Anna Monta Olek	(Netherlands) Yael van Heemst	(Netherlands) Lieke Derks
+78 kg	(France) Léa Fontaine	(France) Coralie Hayme	(Netherlands) Marit Kamps
+78 kg	(France) Léa Fontaine	(France) Coralie Hayme	(Turkey) Hilal Öztürk

=== Mixed ===
Event	Gold	Silver	Bronze
Mixed team	France	Turkey	Russia
Mixed team	France	Turkey	Netherlands

Source Results

=== Medal table ===
* Host nation (Luxembourg)

Rank	Nation	Gold	Silver	Bronze	Total
1	France (FRA)	4	4	1	9
2	Russia (RUS)	4	1	2	7
3	Georgia (GEO)	1	2	2	5
4	Hungary (HUN)	1	2	1	4
5	Croatia (CRO)	1	1	1	3
6	Ukraine (UKR)	1	0	3	4
7	Germany (GER)	1	0	2	3
8	Israel (ISR)	1	0	1	2
9	Romania (ROU)	1	0	0	1
10	Netherlands (NED)	0	2	4	6
11	Turkey (TUR)	0	1	2	3
12	Azerbaijan (AZE)	0	1	0	1
12	Slovenia (SLO)	0	1	0	1
14	Italy (ITA)	0	0	3	3
15	Poland (POL)	0	0	2	2
15	Spain (ESP)	0	0	2	2
17	Austria (AUT)	0	0	1	1
17	Czech Republic (CZE)	0	0	1	1
17	Kosovo (KOS)	0	0	1	1
17	Portugal (POR)	0	0	1	1
Totals (20 entries)		15	15	30	60

Source: "Junior European Judo Championships 2021 – Individual – Standings". International Judo Federation. & "Junior European Judo Championships 2021 – Team – Results". International Judo Federation.
