= 2021 European U23 Judo Championships =

International youth judo competition

Judo 2021 European U23 Judo Championships
- Venue: Ludovika University
- Location: Budapest, Hungary
- Dates: 5–7 November 2021
- Competitors: 297 from 38 nations

Champions
- Mixed team: Georgia (1st title)

Competition at external databases
- Links: IJF • JudoInside

The 2021 European U23 Judo Championships were an edition of the European U23 Judo Championships, organised by the European Judo Union. It was held in Budapest, Hungary from 5–7 November 2021. The final day of competition featured the inaugural U23 European Championships mixed team event, won by ream Georgia.

== Event videos ==
The event will air freely on the EJU YouTube channel.

	Weight classes	Preliminaries			Final Block	
Day 1	Men: -60, -66, -73 Women: -48, -52, -57, -63	Commentated: English, Hungarian			Commentated: English, Hungarian	
Day 1	Men: -60, -66, -73 Women: -48, -52, -57, -63	Tatami 1	Tatami 2	Tatami 3	Tatami 1	Tatami 2
Day 2	Men: -81, -90, -100, +100 Women: -70, -78, +78	Commentated: English, Hungarian			Commentated: English, Hungarian	
Day 2	Men: -81, -90, -100, +100 Women: -70, -78, +78	Tatami 1	Tatami 2	Tatami 3	Tatami 1	Tatami 2
Day 3	Mixed team	Commentated: English, Hungarian			Commentated: English, Hungarian	
Day 3	Mixed team	Tatami 1	Tatami 2	Tatami 3	Tatami 1	Tatami 2

== Medal overview ==
=== Men ===
Event	Gold	Silver	Bronze
−60 kg	Malik Karmov (RUS)	Biagio D'Angelo (ITA)	Mihraç Akkuş (TUR)
−60 kg	Malik Karmov (RUS)	Biagio D'Angelo (ITA)	Vache Adamyan (AUT)
−66 kg	Lucian Dumitrescu (ROU)	Radu Izvoreanu (MDA)	Ismail Misirov (RUS)
−66 kg	Lucian Dumitrescu (ROU)	Radu Izvoreanu (MDA)	Giorgi Tutashvili (GEO)
−73 kg	Armen Agaian (RUS)	Aleko Mamiashvili (GEO)	Khamzat Akhmarov (RUS)
−73 kg	Armen Agaian (RUS)	Aleko Mamiashvili (GEO)	Adil Osmanov (MDA)
−81 kg	Tato Grigalashvili (GEO)	Vladimir Akhalakatsi (GEO)	Benedek Tóth (HUN)
−81 kg	Tato Grigalashvili (GEO)	Vladimir Akhalakatsi (GEO)	Giacomo Gamba (ITA)
−90 kg	Gennaro Pirelli (ITA)	Mansur Lorsanov (RUS)	Darko Brašnjović (SRB)
−90 kg	Gennaro Pirelli (ITA)	Mansur Lorsanov (RUS)	Johann Lenz (GER)
−100 kg	Ilia Sulamanidze (GEO)	Zsombor Vég (HUN)	Mert Şişmanlar (TUR)
−100 kg	Ilia Sulamanidze (GEO)	Zsombor Vég (HUN)	Giorgi Chikovani (GEO)
+100 kg	Valeriy Endovitskiy (RUS)	Richárd Sipőcz (HUN)	Gela Zaalishvili (GEO)
+100 kg	Valeriy Endovitskiy (RUS)	Richárd Sipőcz (HUN)	Jonas Schreiber (GER)

=== Women ===
Event	Gold	Silver	Bronze
−48 kg	Andrea Stojadinov (SRB)	Ramila Aliyeva (AZE)	Mireia Lapuerta Comas (ESP)
−48 kg	Andrea Stojadinov (SRB)	Ramila Aliyeva (AZE)	Amy Platten (GBR)
−52 kg	Ana Viktorija Puljiz (CRO)	Mascha Ballhaus (GER)	Nadežda Petrović (SRB)
−52 kg	Ana Viktorija Puljiz (CRO)	Mascha Ballhaus (GER)	Martina Castagnola (ITA)
−57 kg	Seija Ballhaus (GER)	Nora Bannenberg (GER)	Flaka Loxha (KOS)
−57 kg	Seija Ballhaus (GER)	Nora Bannenberg (GER)	Ophélie Vellozzi (FRA)
−63 kg	Angelika Szymańska (POL)	Annabelle Winzig (GER)	Anastasiia Antipina (UKR)
−63 kg	Angelika Szymańska (POL)	Annabelle Winzig (GER)	Szofi Özbas (HUN)
−70 kg	Martina Esposito (ITA)	Irene Pedrotti (ITA)	Eliza Wróblewska (POL)
−70 kg	Martina Esposito (ITA)	Irene Pedrotti (ITA)	Silja Kok (NED)
−78 kg	Patrícia Sampaio (POR)	Petrunjela Pavić (CRO)	Nadezhda Tatarchenko (RUS)
−78 kg	Patrícia Sampaio (POR)	Petrunjela Pavić (CRO)	Lea Schmid (GER)
+78 kg	Elisabeth Pflugbeil (GER)	Sophio Somkhishvili (GEO)	Hilal Öztürk (TUR)
+78 kg	Elisabeth Pflugbeil (GER)	Sophio Somkhishvili (GEO)	Kübranur Esir (TUR)

=== Mixed ===
Event	Gold	Silver	Bronze
Mixed team	Georgia	Russia	Hungary
Mixed team	Georgia	Russia	France

=== Medal table ===
* Host nation (Hungary)

Rank	Nation	Gold	Silver	Bronze	Total
1	Georgia (GEO)	3	3	3	9
2	Russia (RUS)	3	2	3	8
3	Germany (GER)	2	3	3	8
4	Italy (ITA)	2	2	2	6
5	Croatia (CRO)	1	1	0	2
6	Serbia (SRB)	1	0	2	3
7	Poland (POL)	1	0	1	2
8	Portugal (POR)	1	0	0	1
8	Romania (ROU)	1	0	0	1
10	Hungary (HUN)*	0	2	3	5
11	Moldova (MDA)	0	1	1	2
12	Azerbaijan (AZE)	0	1	0	1
13	Turkey (TUR)	0	0	4	4
14	France (FRA)	0	0	2	2
15	Austria (AUT)	0	0	1	1
15	Great Britain (GBR)	0	0	1	1
15	Kosovo (KOS)	0	0	1	1
15	Netherlands (NED)	0	0	1	1
15	Spain (ESP)	0	0	1	1
15	Ukraine (UKR)	0	0	1	1
Totals (20 entries)		15	15	30	60
