= 2026 European Cadet Judo Championships =

Judo competition

Judo 2026 European Cadet Judo Championships
- Venue: Gran Canaria Arena
- Location: Las Palmas, Gran Canaria, Spain
- Dates: 29 June – 2 July
- Competitors: 425 from 43 nations

Champions
- Mixed team: France (3rd title)

Competition at external databases
- Links: IJF • JudoInside

The 2026 European Cadet Judo Championships was held at the Gran Canaria Arena in Las Palmas, Gran Canaria, Spain, from 29 June to 2 July 2026 The last day of competition featured a mixed team event.

== Medal summary ==
=== Men's events ===
| Event | Gold | Silver | Bronze |
|---|---|---|---|
| −50 kg | Nihad Aghayev (AZE) | Farid Rzazade (AZE) | Ismael Mehabra (ITA) |
| −50 kg | Nihad Aghayev (AZE) | Farid Rzazade (AZE) | Andrea Hoffmann (FRA) |
| −55 kg | Jules Back (FRA) | Luca Martini (ITA) | Noham Benkrouidem (FRA) |
| −55 kg | Jules Back (FRA) | Luca Martini (ITA) | Ibrahim Talibov (AZE) |
| −60 kg | Khazar Heydarov (UKR) | Ramazan Aykut Gur (TUR) | Timeo Cori (SUI) |
| −60 kg | Khazar Heydarov (UKR) | Ramazan Aykut Gur (TUR) | Mahmoud Jaafar (BUL) |
| −66 kg | Nikola Radanov (SRB) | Tom Simkhaev (ISR) | Itamar Cohen (ISR) |
| −66 kg | Nikola Radanov (SRB) | Tom Simkhaev (ISR) | Ilkin Garayev (AZE) |
| −73 kg | Ivan Nikolchev (BUL) | Sadig Mammadov (AZE) | Giorgi Mtchedlishvili (GEO) |
| −73 kg | Ivan Nikolchev (BUL) | Sadig Mammadov (AZE) | Aron Nagy (HUN) |
| −81 kg | Aleks Krivec (SLO) | Cristian Parisi (ITA) | Aykhan Hasanli (AZE) |
| −81 kg | Aleks Krivec (SLO) | Cristian Parisi (ITA) | Yagub Mammadov (AZE) |
| −90 kg | Tajus Babaičenko (LTU) | Omar Akhundov (AZE) | Pablo Fernandez Calero (ESP) |
| −90 kg | Tajus Babaičenko (LTU) | Omar Akhundov (AZE) | Nika Niguriani (GEO) |
| +90 kg | Tsvetomir Valkov (BUL) | Marko Vujica (CRO) | Melichar Skoda (CZE) |
| +90 kg | Tsvetomir Valkov (BUL) | Marko Vujica (CRO) | Ilia Zakutashvili (GEO) |

=== Women's events ===
| Event | Gold | Silver | Bronze |
|---|---|---|---|
| −40 kg | Zahra Guliyeva (AZE) | Nora Pirbus-Grof (HUN) | Dominika Gracova (CZE) |
| −40 kg | Zahra Guliyeva (AZE) | Nora Pirbus-Grof (HUN) | Elcin Karakazan (TUR) |
| −44 kg | Aurora Ferro (ITA) | Yağmur Yılmaztürk (TUR) | Sofia Mavrova (BUL) |
| −44 kg | Aurora Ferro (ITA) | Yağmur Yılmaztürk (TUR) | Fenne Peeters (BEL) |
| −48 kg | Nina Podymska (POL) | Eva Moreno Torres (ESP) | Konul Eyvazli (AZE) |
| −48 kg | Nina Podymska (POL) | Eva Moreno Torres (ESP) | Viktoria Grigoryan (BEL) |
| −52 kg | Yali Yahav (ISR) | Kseniia Kyrylchuk (UKR) | Matilda Mariello (ITA) |
| −52 kg | Yali Yahav (ISR) | Kseniia Kyrylchuk (UKR) | Vivien Vadovičová (SVK) |
| −57 kg | Jagoda Ciupek (POL) | Zarja Mastnak (SLO) | Sophia Baechle (GER) |
| −57 kg | Jagoda Ciupek (POL) | Zarja Mastnak (SLO) | Julia Siemko (POL) |
| −63 kg | Ilariia Tsurkan (SLO) | Tinatin Gulbani (GEO) | Arina Mashurenko (UKR) |
| −63 kg | Ilariia Tsurkan (SLO) | Tinatin Gulbani (GEO) | Bleona Rama (AUT) |
| −70 kg | Neža Hladnik (SLO) | Diana Samoiliuk (UKR) | Valerie Tombou (BEL) |
| −70 kg | Neža Hladnik (SLO) | Diana Samoiliuk (UKR) | Csenge Torok (HUN) |
| +70 kg | Hatice Tuana Balcı (TUR) | Yana Dovhun (UKR) | Maia Ghvaladze (GEO) |
| +70 kg | Hatice Tuana Balcı (TUR) | Yana Dovhun (UKR) | Michaela Hoellwart (AUT) |

=== Mixed ===
| Event | Gold | Silver | Bronze |
|---|---|---|---|
| Mixed team | France | Ukraine | Georgia |
| Mixed team | France | Ukraine | Slovenia |

=== Medal table ===
* Host nation (Spain)

| Rank | Nation | Gold | Silver | Bronze | Total |
|---|---|---|---|---|---|
| 1 | Slovenia (SLO) | 3 | 1 | 1 | 5 |
| 2 | Azerbaijan (AZE) | 2 | 3 | 5 | 10 |
| 3 | Bulgaria (BUL) | 2 | 0 | 2 | 4 |
| 3 | France (FRA) | 2 | 0 | 2 | 4 |
| 5 | Poland (POL) | 2 | 0 | 1 | 3 |
| 6 | Ukraine (UKR) | 1 | 4 | 1 | 6 |
| 7 | Italy (ITA) | 1 | 2 | 2 | 5 |
| 8 | Turkey (TUR) | 1 | 2 | 1 | 4 |
| 9 | Israel (ISR) | 1 | 1 | 1 | 3 |
| 10 | Lithuania (LTU) | 1 | 0 | 0 | 1 |
| 10 | Serbia (SRB) | 1 | 0 | 0 | 1 |
| 12 | Georgia (GEO) | 0 | 1 | 5 | 6 |
| 13 | Hungary (HUN) | 0 | 1 | 2 | 3 |
| 14 | Spain (ESP)* | 0 | 1 | 1 | 2 |
| 15 | Croatia (CRO) | 0 | 1 | 0 | 1 |
| 16 | Belgium (BEL) | 0 | 0 | 3 | 3 |
| 17 | Austria (AUT) | 0 | 0 | 2 | 2 |
| 17 | Czech Republic (CZE) | 0 | 0 | 2 | 2 |
| 19 | Germany (GER) | 0 | 0 | 1 | 1 |
| 19 | Slovakia (SVK) | 0 | 0 | 1 | 1 |
| 19 | Switzerland (SUI) | 0 | 0 | 1 | 1 |
| Totals (21 entries) | | 17 | 17 | 34 | 68 |
