= 2018 European Cadet Judo Championships =

Judo competition

Judo 2018 European Cadet Judo Championships
- Venue: Zetra Olympic Hall
- Location: Sarajevo, Bosnia and Herzegovina
- Dates: 28 June – 1 July 2018
- Competitors: 457 from 42 nations

Champions
- Mixed team: Russia (1st title)

Competition at external databases
- Links: IJF • JudoInside

The 2018 European Cadet Judo Championships is an edition of the European Cadet Judo Championships, organised by the International Judo Federation. It was held at the Zetra Olympic Hall in Sarajevo, Bosnia and Herzegovina from 28 June to 1 July 2018. The final day of competition featured a mixed team event, won by team Russia.

== Medal summary ==
=== Medal table ===
* Host nation (Bosnia and Herzegovina)

Rank	Nation	Gold	Silver	Bronze	Total
1	Russia (RUS)	7	3	1	11
2	France (FRA)	2	0	1	3
3	Italy (ITA)	1	4	1	6
4	Turkey (TUR)	1	2	5	8
5	Netherlands (NED)	1	2	3	6
6	Hungary (HUN)	1	0	3	4
6	Romania (ROU)	1	0	3	4
8	Belarus (BLR)	1	0	0	1
8	Kosovo (KOS)	1	0	0	1
10	Croatia (CRO)	0	2	0	2
11	Georgia (GEO)	0	1	4	5
12	Azerbaijan (AZE)	0	1	1	2
13	Spain (ESP)	0	1	0	1
14	Austria (AUT)	0	0	2	2
15	Belgium (BEL)	0	0	1	1
15	Finland (FIN)	0	0	1	1
15	Germany (GER)	0	0	1	1
15	Lithuania (LTU)	0	0	1	1
15	North Macedonia (MKD)	0	0	1	1
15	Poland (POL)	0	0	1	1
15	Slovenia (SLO)	0	0	1	1
15	Ukraine (UKR)	0	0	1	1
Totals (22 entries)		16	16	32	64

=== Men's events ===
Event	Gold	Silver	Bronze
−50 kg	Iznaur Saaev (RUS)	Emirhan Karahan (TUR)	Muhammed Demirel (TUR)
−50 kg	Iznaur Saaev (RUS)	Emirhan Karahan (TUR)	Miragha Hajiyev (AZE)
−55 kg	Artsiom Kolasau (BLR)	Abu Muslim Parchiev (RUS)	Oleh Veredyba (UKR)
−55 kg	Artsiom Kolasau (BLR)	Abu Muslim Parchiev (RUS)	Daniel Leutgeb (AUT)
−60 kg	Kantemir Kodzov (RUS)	Matin Rzazade (AZE)	Salih Yıldız (TUR)
−60 kg	Kantemir Kodzov (RUS)	Matin Rzazade (AZE)	Turpal Djoukaev (FIN)
−66 kg	Abrek Naguchev (RUS)	Javier Pena Insausti (ESP)	Hamza Jashari (MKD)
−66 kg	Abrek Naguchev (RUS)	Javier Pena Insausti (ESP)	Luka Kapanadze (GEO)
−73 kg	Ibragimgadzhi Suleimanov (RUS)	Igor Talunin (RUS)	Gergely Nerpel (HUN)
−73 kg	Ibragimgadzhi Suleimanov (RUS)	Igor Talunin (RUS)	Adrian Sulca (ROU)
−81 kg	Daniil Umarov (RUS)	Mark van Dijk (NED)	Alex Creţ (ROU)
−81 kg	Daniil Umarov (RUS)	Mark van Dijk (NED)	Giorgi Sherazadishvili (GEO)
−90 kg	Matvey Kanikovskiy (RUS)	Nika Kharazishvili (GEO)	Ilia Sulamanidze (GEO)
−90 kg	Matvey Kanikovskiy (RUS)	Nika Kharazishvili (GEO)	Zsombor Vég (HUN)
+90 kg	Richárd Sipőcz (HUN)	Ömer Aydın (TUR)	Saba Inaneishvili (GEO)
+90 kg	Richárd Sipőcz (HUN)	Ömer Aydın (TUR)	Wojciech Kordyalik (POL)

=== Women's events ===
Event	Gold	Silver	Bronze
−40 kg	Giorgia Hagianu (ROU)	Giulia Giorgi (ITA)	Ghjuliana Ballo (FRA)
−40 kg	Giorgia Hagianu (ROU)	Giulia Giorgi (ITA)	Muberra Gunes (TUR)
−44 kg	Erza Muminoviq (KOS)	Ana Viktorija Puljiz (CRO)	Merve Azak (TUR)
−44 kg	Erza Muminoviq (KOS)	Ana Viktorija Puljiz (CRO)	Glafira Borisova (RUS)
−48 kg	Irena Khubulova (RUS)	Assunta Scutto (ITA)	Elin Henninger (NED)
−48 kg	Irena Khubulova (RUS)	Assunta Scutto (ITA)	Carlotta Avanzato (ITA)
−52 kg	Faïza Mokdar (FRA)	Veronica Toniolo (ITA)	Dewy Lo A Njoe (NED)
−52 kg	Faïza Mokdar (FRA)	Veronica Toniolo (ITA)	Alexandra Pasca (ROU)
−57 kg	Hasret Bozkurt (TUR)	Lara Cvjetko (CRO)	Lisa Grabner (AUT)
−57 kg	Hasret Bozkurt (TUR)	Lara Cvjetko (CRO)	Joanne Van Lieshout (NED)
−63 kg	Marin Visser (NED)	Martina Lanini (ITA)	Alessia Corrao (BEL)
−63 kg	Marin Visser (NED)	Martina Lanini (ITA)	Szofi Özbas (HUN)
−70 kg	Martina Esposito (ITA)	Daria Kariakina (RUS)	Raffaela Igl (GER)
−70 kg	Martina Esposito (ITA)	Daria Kariakina (RUS)	Metka Lobnik (SLO)
+70 kg	Léa Fontaine (FRA)	Marit Kamps (NED)	Justina Kmieliauskaite (LTU)
+70 kg	Léa Fontaine (FRA)	Marit Kamps (NED)	Mine Kalender (TUR)

Source Results

=== Mixed ===
Event	Gold	Silver	Bronze
Mixed team	Russia	Netherlands	Turkey
Mixed team	Russia	Netherlands	Romania

Source Results
