= 2022 European Junior Judo Championships =

Judo competition

Judo 2022 European Junior Judo Championships
- Venue: UNYP Arena
- Location: Prague, Czech Republic
- Dates: 15–18 September 2022
- Competitors: 349 from 39 nations

Champions
- Mixed team: France (2nd title)

Competition at external databases
- Links: IJF • EJU • JudoInside

The 2022 European Junior Judo Championships was held at the UNYP Arena in Prague, Czech Republic, from 15 to 18 September 2022. The final day of competition featured a mixed team event.

== Schedule & event videos ==
The event aired on the EJU YouTube channel. The draw was held on 14 September at 16:00. All times are local (UTC+2).

	Date	Weight classes	Preliminaries				Final Block		
	Date	Weight classes	Start time	Videos			Start time	Videos	
Day 1	15 September	Men: –60, –66 Women: –48, –52, –57	10:00	Commentated			16:00	Commentated	
Day 1	15 September	Men: –60, –66 Women: –48, –52, –57	10:00	Tatami 1	Tatami 2	Tatami 3	16:00	Tatami 2	Tatami 3
Day 2	16 September	Men: –73, –81 Women: –63, –70	11:00	Commentated			16:00	Commentated	
Day 2	16 September	Men: –73, –81 Women: –63, –70	11:00	Tatami 1	Tatami 2	Tatami 3	16:00	Tatami 2	Tatami 3
Day 3	17 September	Men: –90, –100, +100 Women: –78, +78	12:00	Commentated			16:00	Commentated	
Day 3	17 September	Men: –90, –100, +100 Women: –78, +78	12:00	Tatami 1	Tatami 2	Tatami 3	16:00	Tatami 2	Tatami 3
Day 4	18 September	Mixed team	11:00	Commentated			15:00	Commentated	
Day 4	18 September	Mixed team	11:00	Tatami 1	Tatami 2	Tatami 3	15:00	Tatami 2	Tatami 3

== Medal summary ==
=== Men's events ===
Event	Gold	Silver	Bronze
Extra-lightweight (−60 kg)	Ksawery Ignasiak (POL)	Turan Bayramov (AZE)	Nazar Viskov (UKR)
Extra-lightweight (−60 kg)	Ksawery Ignasiak (POL)	Turan Bayramov (AZE)	Yam Wolczak (ISR)
Half-lightweight (−66 kg)	Muhammed Demirel (TUR)	Aleko Kasradze (GEO)	İbrahim Demirel (TUR)
Half-lightweight (−66 kg)	Muhammed Demirel (TUR)	Aleko Kasradze (GEO)	Ioan Dzițac (ROU)
Lightweight (−73 kg)	Vusal Galandarzade (AZE)	Luigi Centracchio (ITA)	Vincenzo Pelligra (ITA)
Lightweight (−73 kg)	Vusal Galandarzade (AZE)	Luigi Centracchio (ITA)	Dardan Cena (KOS)
Half-middleweight (−81 kg)	Eljan Hajiyev (AZE)	Bright Maddaloni Nosa (ITA)	Stefan Zubović (SRB)
Half-middleweight (−81 kg)	Eljan Hajiyev (AZE)	Bright Maddaloni Nosa (ITA)	Adam Kopecký (CZE)
Middleweight (−90 kg)	Vugar Talibov (AZE)	Ivan Kutenkov (UKR)	Miljan Radulj (SRB)
Middleweight (−90 kg)	Vugar Talibov (AZE)	Ivan Kutenkov (UKR)	Ismayil Zamanov (AZE)
Half-heavyweight (−100 kg)	Daniele Accogli (ITA)	Michał Jędrzejewski (POL)	Jean Carletti (ITA)
Half-heavyweight (−100 kg)	Daniele Accogli (ITA)	Michał Jędrzejewski (POL)	Mikheil Japaridze (GEO)
Heavyweight (+100 kg)	Shalva Gureshidze (GEO)	Münir Ertuğ (TUR)	Alin Bagrin (MDA)
Heavyweight (+100 kg)	Shalva Gureshidze (GEO)	Münir Ertuğ (TUR)	Ucha Tabatadze (GEO)

=== Women's events ===
Event	Gold	Silver	Bronze
Extra-lightweight (−48 kg)	Merve Azak (TUR)	Sıla Ersin (TUR)	Pauline Cuq (FRA)
Extra-lightweight (−48 kg)	Merve Azak (TUR)	Sıla Ersin (TUR)	Léa Beres (FRA)
Half-lightweight (−52 kg)	Pihla Salonen (FIN)	Chloé Devictor (FRA)	Alya De Carvalho (FRA)
Half-lightweight (−52 kg)	Pihla Salonen (FIN)	Chloé Devictor (FRA)	Marina Castelló (ESP)
Lightweight (−57 kg)	Julie Beurskens (NED)	Marta García (ESP)	Verena Hiden (AUT)
Lightweight (−57 kg)	Julie Beurskens (NED)	Marta García (ESP)	Özlem Yıldız (TUR)
Half-middleweight (−63 kg)	Laura Vázquez (ESP)	Adelina Novitzki (ISR)	Sara Lisciani (ITA)
Half-middleweight (−63 kg)	Laura Vázquez (ESP)	Adelina Novitzki (ISR)	Ines Filipović (CRO)
Middleweight (−70 kg)	Ai Tsunoda (ESP)	Elena Dengg (AUT)	Sarah Mehlau (GER)
Middleweight (−70 kg)	Ai Tsunoda (ESP)	Elena Dengg (AUT)	Maya Kogan (ISR)
Half-heavyweight (−78 kg)	Yelyzaveta Lytvynenko (UKR)	Yael van Heemst (NED)	Lieke Derks (NED)
Half-heavyweight (−78 kg)	Yelyzaveta Lytvynenko (UKR)	Yael van Heemst (NED)	Yuliia Kurchenko (UKR)
Heavyweight (+78 kg)	Hilal Öztürk (TUR)	Asya Tavano (ITA)	Carmen Dijkstra (NED)
Heavyweight (+78 kg)	Hilal Öztürk (TUR)	Asya Tavano (ITA)	Oxana Diacenco (MDA)

Source Results

=== Mixed ===
Event	Gold	Silver	Bronze
Mixed team	France	Turkey	Azerbaijan
Mixed team	France	Turkey	Georgia

=== Medal table ===
* Host nation (Czech Republic)

Rank	Nation	Gold	Silver	Bronze	Total
1	Turkey (TUR)	3	3	2	8
2	Azerbaijan (AZE)	3	1	2	6
3	Spain (ESP)	2	1	1	4
4	Italy (ITA)	1	3	3	7
5	France (FRA)	1	1	3	5
5	Georgia (GEO)	1	1	3	5
7	Netherlands (NED)	1	1	2	4
7	Ukraine (UKR)	1	1	2	4
9	Poland (POL)	1	1	0	2
10	Finland (FIN)	1	0	0	1
11	Israel (ISR)	0	1	2	3
12	Austria (AUT)	0	1	1	2
13	Moldova (MDA)	0	0	2	2
13	Serbia (SRB)	0	0	2	2
15	Croatia (CRO)	0	0	1	1
15	Czech Republic (CZE)*	0	0	1	1
15	Germany (GER)	0	0	1	1
15	Kosovo (KOS)	0	0	1	1
15	Romania (ROU)	0	0	1	1
Totals (19 entries)		15	15	30	60
