= 2017 European Cadet Judo Championships =

Judo competition

Judo 2017 European Cadet Judo Championships
- Venue: Žalgiris Arena
- Location: Kaunas, Lithuania
- Dates: 30 June – 2 July 2017
- Competitors: 430 from 42 nations

Champions
- Men's team: Georgia (3rd title)
- Women's team: Germany (1st title)

Competition at external databases
- Links: IJF • JudoInside

The 2017 European Cadet Judo Championships is an edition of the European Cadet Judo Championships, organised by the International Judo Federation. It was held in Kaunas, Lithuania from 30 June to 2 July 2017. The final day of competition featured team events, with team Georgia winning the men's event and team Germany the women's.

== Medal summary ==
=== Medal table ===
* Host nation (Lithuania)

Rank	Nation	Gold	Silver	Bronze	Total
1	Russia (RUS)	3	1	5	9
2	Georgia (GEO)	3	1	1	5
3	Germany (GER)	2	1	5	8
4	Turkey (TUR)	2	0	2	4
5	Croatia (CRO)	2	0	0	2
6	Azerbaijan (AZE)	1	3	1	5
7	Hungary (HUN)	1	3	0	4
8	Italy (ITA)	1	2	4	7
9	Serbia (SRB)	1	1	0	2
10	Israel (ISR)	0	2	1	3
11	France (FRA)	0	1	1	2
11	Ukraine (UKR)	0	1	1	2
13	Kosovo (KOS)	0	0	2	2
13	Netherlands (NED)	0	0	2	2
13	Poland (POL)	0	0	2	2
16	Belgium (BEL)	0	0	1	1
16	Latvia (LAT)	0	0	1	1
16	Moldova (MDA)	0	0	1	1
16	Montenegro (MNE)	0	0	1	1
16	Slovenia (SLO)	0	0	1	1
Totals (20 entries)		16	16	32	64

=== Men's events ===
Event	Gold	Silver	Bronze
−50 kg	Georgii Tretiakov (RUS)	Csanád Feczkó (HUN)	Abdulaziz Kara (TUR)
−50 kg	Georgii Tretiakov (RUS)	Csanád Feczkó (HUN)	Ejder Toktay (TUR)
−55 kg	Mihraç Akkuş (TUR)	Aykhan Tanriverdiyev (AZE)	Abrek Naguchev (RUS)
−55 kg	Mihraç Akkuş (TUR)	Aykhan Tanriverdiyev (AZE)	Matan Shani (ISR)
−60 kg	Kazbek Naguchev (RUS)	Vusal Ibrahimov (AZE)	Davud Abasli (AZE)
−60 kg	Kazbek Naguchev (RUS)	Vusal Ibrahimov (AZE)	Vadym Chernov (UKR)
−66 kg	Mikheili Bakhbakhashvili (GEO)	Gnyaz Mahmudlu (AZE)	Giovanni Zaraca (ITA)
−66 kg	Mikheili Bakhbakhashvili (GEO)	Gnyaz Mahmudlu (AZE)	Dmitrii Pridira (RUS)
−73 kg	Lasha Bekauri (GEO)	Kenny Komi Bedel (ITA)	Armen Agaian (RUS)
−73 kg	Lasha Bekauri (GEO)	Kenny Komi Bedel (ITA)	Mattia Prosdocimo (ITA)
−81 kg	Mert Şişmanlar (TUR)	Benedek Tóth (HUN)	Johann Lenz (GER)
−81 kg	Mert Şişmanlar (TUR)	Benedek Tóth (HUN)	Eugen Matveiciuc (MDA)
−90 kg	Enrico Bergamelli (ITA)	Mikheili Bekauri (GEO)	Valeriy Endovitskiy (RUS)
−90 kg	Enrico Bergamelli (ITA)	Mikheili Bekauri (GEO)	Shpati Zekaj (KOS)
+90 kg	David Babayan (RUS)	Richárd Sipőcz (HUN)	Vladlens Jarockis (LAT)
+90 kg	David Babayan (RUS)	Richárd Sipőcz (HUN)	Levan Tchelidze (GEO)
Team	Georgia	Hungary	Italy
Team	Georgia	Hungary	Russia

=== Women's events ===
Event	Gold	Silver	Bronze
−40 kg	Vusala Karimova (AZE)	Anastasiia Balaban (UKR)	Jente Verstraeten (BEL)
−40 kg	Vusala Karimova (AZE)	Anastasiia Balaban (UKR)	Ivana Nikolić (MNE)
−44 kg	Ana Viktorija Puljiz (CRO)	Tamar Malca (ISR)	Nikola Szlachta (POL)
−44 kg	Ana Viktorija Puljiz (CRO)	Tamar Malca (ISR)	Liza Gateau (FRA)
−48 kg	Mascha Ballhaus (GER)	Andrea Stojadinov (SRB)	Chiara Palanca (ITA)
−48 kg	Mascha Ballhaus (GER)	Andrea Stojadinov (SRB)	Jana Gussenberg (GER)
−52 kg	Szofi Özbas (HUN)	Gefen Primo (ISR)	Seija Ballhaus (GER)
−52 kg	Szofi Özbas (HUN)	Gefen Primo (ISR)	Annika Würfel (GER)
−57 kg	Lara Cvjetko (CRO)	Giovanna Fusco (ITA)	Natalia Kropska (POL)
−57 kg	Lara Cvjetko (CRO)	Giovanna Fusco (ITA)	Irina Zueva (RUS)
−63 kg	Anja Obradović (SRB)	Annabelle Winzig (GER)	Laura Fazliu (KOS)
−63 kg	Anja Obradović (SRB)	Annabelle Winzig (GER)	Zarja Tavcar (SLO)
−70 kg	Marlene Galandi (GER)	Morgane Fereol (FRA)	Martina Esposito (ITA)
−70 kg	Marlene Galandi (GER)	Morgane Fereol (FRA)	Senna van de Veerdonk (NED)
+70 kg	Sophio Somkhishvili (GEO)	Daria Vladimirova (RUS)	Marit Kamps (NED)
+70 kg	Sophio Somkhishvili (GEO)	Daria Vladimirova (RUS)	Hanna Rollwage (GER)
Team	Germany	Serbia	Russia
Team	Germany	Serbia	France

Source Results
