= Kenny Liveze =

French judoka (born 2002)

Kenny Livèze
Personal information
- Nationality: French
- Born: 10 April 2002 (age 24)
- Occupation: Judoka

Sport
- Country: France
- Sport: Judo
- Weight class: –100 kg
- Club: ACBB Judo

Achievements and titles
- World Champ.: R32 (2022)
Medal record
Men's judo
Representing France
World Championships
Silver medal – second place	2022 Tashkent	Mixed team
World Juniors Championships
Gold medal – first place	2022 Guayaquil	–100 kg
World Cadets Championships
Gold medal – first place	2019 Almaty	–90 kg
European Cadet Championships
Gold medal – first place	2019 Warsaw	–90 kg

Profile at external databases
- IJF: 43660
- JudoInside.com: 117357
- Updated on 29 September 2022

Kenny Livèze (born 10 April 2002) is a French judoka. He became Cadet European Champion and Cadet World champion in 2019 (–90 kg) and Junior World Champion in 2022 (–100 kg).

On 13 November 2020, he suffered a stroke during a judo competition at the Palais des Expositions in Perpignan. Transferred to Montpellier hospital, he was immediately taken care of by doctors who did not consider it necessary to perform surgery. He has no known sequelae from this health accident.
