= 2021 World Judo Juniors Championships =

Judo competition

Judo 2021 World Judo Juniors Championships
- Venue: Geopalace
- Location: Olbia, Italy
- Dates: 6–10 October 2021
- Competitors: 490 from 72 nations

Champions
- Mixed team: France (1st title)

Competition at external databases
- Links: IJF • JudoInside

The 2021 World Judo Juniors Championships was held between 6 and 10 October 2021 in Olbia, Italy. On its last day, the contest featured the 2021 World Juniors Mixed Team Championships.

== Event videos ==
The event aired freely on the IJF YouTube channel.

	Weight classes	Preliminaries			Final Block
Day 1	Men: -60, -66 Women: -48, -52	Commentated			Commentated
Day 1	Men: -60, -66 Women: -48, -52	Tatami 1	Tatami 2	Tatami 3	Commentated
Day 2	Men: -73 Women: -57, -63	Commentated			Commentated
Day 2	Men: -73 Women: -57, -63	Tatami 1	Tatami 2	Tatami 3	Commentated
Day 3	Men: -81, -90 Women: -70	Commentated			Commentated
Day 3	Men: -81, -90 Women: -70	Tatami 1	Tatami 2	Tatami 3	Commentated
Day 4	Men: -100, +100 Women: -78, +78	Commentated			Commentated
Day 4	Men: -100, +100 Women: -78, +78	Tatami 1	Tatami 2	Tatami 3	Commentated
Day 5	Mixed Teams	Commentated			Commentated
Day 5	Mixed Teams	Tatami 1	Tatami 2	Tatami 3	Commentated

== Medalists ==
=== Men ===
Event	Gold	Silver	Bronze
−60 kg	(Georgia (country)) Giorgi Sardalashvili	(Azerbaijan) Turan Bayramov	(France) Romain Valadier-Picard
−60 kg	(Georgia (country)) Giorgi Sardalashvili	(Azerbaijan) Turan Bayramov	(Kazakhstan) Sherzod Davlatov
−66 kg	(Russia) Abrek Naguchev	(Germany) Lennart Slamberger	(France) Maxime Gobert
−66 kg	(Russia) Abrek Naguchev	(Germany) Lennart Slamberger	(Ukraine) Yevhen Honcharko
−73 kg	(Romania) Adrian Şulcă	(Turkey) Umalt Demirel	(Italy) Luigi Centracchio
−73 kg	(Romania) Adrian Şulcă	(Turkey) Umalt Demirel	(Czech Republic) Daniel Pochop
−81 kg	(Georgia (country)) Giorgi Sherazadishvili	(Russia) Adam Tsechoev	(Azerbaijan) Eljan Hajiyev
−81 kg	(Georgia (country)) Giorgi Sherazadishvili	(Russia) Adam Tsechoev	(Ukraine) Artem Bubyr
−90 kg	(Hungary) Péter Sáfrány	(Netherlands) Tigo Renes	(Russia) Adam Sangariev
−90 kg	(Hungary) Péter Sáfrány	(Netherlands) Tigo Renes	(France) Maxime-Gaël Ngayap Hambou
−100 kg	(Georgia (country)) Ilia Sulamanidze	(Uzbekistan) Sukhrob Rajabov	(Russia) Matvey Kanikovskiy
−100 kg	(Georgia (country)) Ilia Sulamanidze	(Uzbekistan) Sukhrob Rajabov	(Uzbekistan) Utkirbek Turoboyev
+100 kg	(Georgia (country)) Saba Inaneishvili	(Hungary) Richárd Sipőcz	(Georgia (country)) Irakli Demetrashvili
+100 kg	(Georgia (country)) Saba Inaneishvili	(Hungary) Richárd Sipőcz	(Germany) Yvo Witassek

=== Women ===
Event	Gold	Silver	Bronze
−48 kg	(Italy) Assunta Scutto	(Russia) Irena Khubulova	(Italy) Asia Avanzato
−48 kg	(Italy) Assunta Scutto	(Russia) Irena Khubulova	(Brazil) Rafaela Batista
−52 kg	(France) Chloé Devictor	(Italy) Giulia Carnà	(Switzerland) Binta Ndiaye
−52 kg	(France) Chloé Devictor	(Italy) Giulia Carnà	(Kosovo) Erza Muminoviq
−57 kg	(Russia) Kseniia Galitskaia	(Israel) Kerem Primo	(France) Faïza Mokdar
−57 kg	(Russia) Kseniia Galitskaia	(Israel) Kerem Primo	(Turkey) Özlem Yıldız
−63 kg	(Netherlands) Joanne van Lieshout	(Spain) Laura Vázquez	(Hungary) Brigitta Varga
−63 kg	(Netherlands) Joanne van Lieshout	(Spain) Laura Vázquez	(Croatia) Katarina Krišto
−70 kg	(Spain) Ai Tsunoda	(Croatia) Lara Cvjetko	(Brazil) Luana Carvalho
−70 kg	(Spain) Ai Tsunoda	(Croatia) Lara Cvjetko	(Poland) Katarzyna Sobierajska
−78 kg	(Germany) Anna Monta Olek	(Netherlands) Yael van Heemst	(Germany) Raffaela Igl
−78 kg	(Germany) Anna Monta Olek	(Netherlands) Yael van Heemst	(Brazil) Eliza Ramos
+78 kg	(France) Coralie Hayme	(Netherlands) Marit Kamps	(Turkey) Hilal Öztürk
+78 kg	(France) Coralie Hayme	(Netherlands) Marit Kamps	(France) Léa Fontaine

=== Mixed ===
Event	Gold	Silver	Bronze
Mixed team	France; Maxime Gobert; Joan-Benjamin Gaba; Francis Damier; Maxime-Gaël Ngayap Hambou; Khamzat Saparbaev; Tieman Diaby; Faïza Mokdar; Martha Fawaz; Mélodie Turpin; Kaïla Issoufi; Léa Fontaine; Coralie Haime	Russia; Omar Gaev; Dmitrii Iakushev; Sergei Eroshenko; Daniil Dranovskii; Saikhan Shabikhanov; Akhmed Magomedov; Natalia Elkina; Alana Alborova; Oksana Kobeleva; Anastasiia Kholodilina; Daria Vasileva; Iana Elkanova	Turkey; Muhammed Demirel; Umalt Demirel; Ömer Aydın; Ahmet Çuhadar; Münir Ertuğ; Hasret Bozkurt; Özlem Yıldız; Habibe Afyonly; Ayten Yeksan; Hilal Öztürk
Mixed team	France; Maxime Gobert; Joan-Benjamin Gaba; Francis Damier; Maxime-Gaël Ngayap Hambou; Khamzat Saparbaev; Tieman Diaby; Faïza Mokdar; Martha Fawaz; Mélodie Turpin; Kaïla Issoufi; Léa Fontaine; Coralie Haime	Russia; Omar Gaev; Dmitrii Iakushev; Sergei Eroshenko; Daniil Dranovskii; Saikhan Shabikhanov; Akhmed Magomedov; Natalia Elkina; Alana Alborova; Oksana Kobeleva; Anastasiia Kholodilina; Daria Vasileva; Iana Elkanova	Germany; Yerrick Schriever; Jano Rübo; Losseni Kone; Fabian Kansy; Daniel Udsilauri; Alexe Wagemaker; Laila Göbel; Friederike Stolze; Samira Bock; Anna Monta Olek; Elisabeth Pflugbeil

== Medal table ==
* Host nation (Italy)

Rank	Nation	Gold	Silver	Bronze	Total
1	Georgia (GEO)	4	0	1	5
2	France (FRA)	3	0	5	8
3	Russia (RUS)	2	3	2	7
4	Netherlands (NED)	1	3	0	4
5	Germany (GER)	1	1	3	5
6	Italy (ITA)*	1	1	2	4
7	Hungary (HUN)	1	1	1	3
8	Spain (ESP)	1	1	0	2
9	Romania (ROU)	1	0	0	1
10	Turkey (TUR)	0	1	3	4
11	Azerbaijan (AZE)	0	1	1	2
11	Croatia (CRO)	0	1	1	2
11	Uzbekistan (UZB)	0	1	1	2
14	Israel (ISR)	0	1	0	1
15	Brazil (BRA)	0	0	3	3
16	Ukraine (UKR)	0	0	2	2
17	Czech Republic (CZE)	0	0	1	1
17	Kazakhstan (KAZ)	0	0	1	1
17	Kosovo (KOS)	0	0	1	1
17	Poland (POL)	0	0	1	1
17	Switzerland (SUI)	0	0	1	1
Totals (21 entries)		15	15	30	60

- "2021 World Junior Championships – Standings". International Judo Federation.
- "2021 World Junior Championships – Teams – Results". International Judo Federation.

== Prize money ==
The sums written are per medalist. (retrieved from:)

Medal	Total	Judoka	Coach
Gold	2,500$	2,000$	500$
Silver	1,500$	1,200$	300$
Bronze	850$	680$	170$

== Participating nations ==
490 from 72 nations:

- Algeria (3)
- Argentina (5)
- Austria (3)
- Azerbaijan (8)
- Belgium (7)
- Bosnia and Herzegovina (2)
- Brazil (13)
- Bulgaria (4)
- Canada (7)
- Cape Verde (1)
- Chile (3)
- Chinese Taipei (1)
- Croatia (4)
- Cyprus (7)
- Czech Republic (5)
- Dominican Republic (2)
- Ecuador (5)
- Estonia (5)
- Finland (3)
- France (18)
- Georgia (13)
- Germany (16)
- Great Britain (7)
- Greece (8)
- Guam (1)
- Guatemala (1)
- Guinea (1)
- Hong Kong (1)
- Hungary (16)
- Iceland (2)
- India (14)
- Israel (11)
- Italy (31)
- Kazakhstan (17)
- Kenya (6)
- Kosovo (2)
- Kuwait (6)
- Kyrgyzstan (8)
- Latvia (4)
- Lebanon (3)
- Lithuania (5)
- Mexico (16)
- Mongolia (9)
- Morocco (4)
- Mozambique (2)
- Netherlands (10)
- Norway (2)
- Paraguay (4)
- Peru (4)
- Poland (4)
- Portugal (8)
- Puerto Rico (2)
- South Korea (4)
- Moldova (9)
- Romania (4)
- Russia (18)
- Saudi Arabia (6)
- Senegal (2)
- Serbia (1)
- Slovakia (3)
- Slovenia (3)
- South Africa (4)
- Spain (9)
- Sweden (3)
- Switzerland (3)
- Tajikistan (7)
- Tunisia (7)
- Turkey (11)
- Ukraine (14)
- United States (17)
- Uzbekistan (17)
- Venezuela (4)
