= 2026 European Junior Judo Championships =

Judo competition

Judo 2026 European Junior Judo Championships
- Venue: Voco Sports Hall
- Location: Podgorica, Montenegro
- Dates: 3–6 September 2026
- Competitors: 400 from 44 nations

Champions
- Mixed team: France (4th title)

Competition at external databases
- Links: IJF • JudoInside

The 2026 European Junior Judo Championships were held at the Voco Sports Hall in Podgorica, Montenegro, from 3 to 6 September 2026. The last day of competition featured a mixed team event.

== Medal summary ==
=== Men's events ===
Event	Gold	Silver	Bronze
Extra-lightweight (−60 kg)	Aykhan Mirzazada (AZE)	Lucien Tixier (FRA)	Danylo Avramenko (UKR)
Extra-lightweight (−60 kg)	Aykhan Mirzazada (AZE)	Lucien Tixier (FRA)	Luka Omanadze (GEO)
Half-lightweight (−66 kg)	Mahammad Musayev (AZE)	Marko Jorgić (SRB)	Abdullakh Parchiev (RUS)
Half-lightweight (−66 kg)	Mahammad Musayev (AZE)	Marko Jorgić (SRB)	Islam Sultygov (RUS)
Lightweight (−73 kg)	Danylo Kravchenko (UKR)	Atmir Soblirov (RUS)	Lucio Tavoletta (ITA)
Lightweight (−73 kg)	Danylo Kravchenko (UKR)	Atmir Soblirov (RUS)	Pavel Koloverdov (RUS)
Half-middleweight (−81 kg)	Stevan Sadiku (MNE)	Akhmed Turluev (RUS)	Noah Boué Kossa (FRA)
Half-middleweight (−81 kg)	Stevan Sadiku (MNE)	Akhmed Turluev (RUS)	Szymon Szulik (POL)
Middleweight (−90 kg)	Suleyman Shukurov (AZE)	Konstantin Distel (GER)	Ademirkan Tambiev (RUS)
Middleweight (−90 kg)	Suleyman Shukurov (AZE)	Konstantin Distel (GER)	Serhii Sokyrko (UKR)
Half-heavyweight (−100 kg)	Nikita Yudanov (ESP)	Vladimir Dosiak (RUS)	Gaya Sonntag (FRA)
Half-heavyweight (−100 kg)	Nikita Yudanov (ESP)	Vladimir Dosiak (RUS)	Davud Namazli (AZE)
Heavyweight (+100 kg)	Kévin Nzuzi Diasivi (FRA)	Mathéo Akiana Mongo (FRA)	Ramazan Ahmadov (AZE)
Heavyweight (+100 kg)	Kévin Nzuzi Diasivi (FRA)	Mathéo Akiana Mongo (FRA)	Marek-Adrian Mäsak (EST)

=== Women's events ===
Event	Gold	Silver	Bronze
Extra-lightweight (−48 kg)	Claudia Pla Belmonte (ESP)	Céline Iddir (FRA)	Patrícia Tománková (SVK)
Extra-lightweight (−48 kg)	Claudia Pla Belmonte (ESP)	Céline Iddir (FRA)	Sofia Zakharova (RUS)
Half-lightweight (−52 kg)	Alyssia Poulange (FRA)	Valeriia Kozlova (RUS)	Marta Beorlegui Oses (ESP)
Half-lightweight (−52 kg)	Alyssia Poulange (FRA)	Valeriia Kozlova (RUS)	Alicia Marques (FRA)
Lightweight (−57 kg)	Nika Tomc (SLO)	Alice Martellacci (ITA)	Clarisse Carillon (FRA)
Lightweight (−57 kg)	Nika Tomc (SLO)	Alice Martellacci (ITA)	Hili Zakroisky (ISR)
Half-middleweight (−63 kg)	Leila Mazouzi (SLO)	Katharina Kaiser (GER)	Aishat Alieva (RUS)
Half-middleweight (−63 kg)	Leila Mazouzi (SLO)	Katharina Kaiser (GER)	María del Rocío Arcones Montenegro (ESP)
Middleweight (−70 kg)	Chloé Jean (FRA)	Sinem Oruç (TUR)	Luna de Kock (NED)
Middleweight (−70 kg)	Chloé Jean (FRA)	Sinem Oruç (TUR)	Amelia Ptasińska (POL)
Half-heavyweight (−78 kg)	Zlata Suprunenko (RUS)	Tuana Gülenay (TUR)	Lucie Rullier (FRA)
Half-heavyweight (−78 kg)	Zlata Suprunenko (RUS)	Tuana Gülenay (TUR)	Korina Džidić (CRO)
Heavyweight (+78 kg)	Léonie Minkada-Caquineau (FRA)	Peppa Plöhnert (GER)	Nina Filkorová (SVK)
Heavyweight (+78 kg)	Léonie Minkada-Caquineau (FRA)	Peppa Plöhnert (GER)	Kira Safonova (RUS)

=== Mixed ===
Event	Gold	Silver	Bronze
Mixed team	France	Russia	Georgia
Mixed team	France	Russia	Ukraine

=== Medal table ===
* Host nation (Montenegro)

Rank	Nation	Gold	Silver	Bronze	Total
1	France (FRA)	5	3	5	13
2	Azerbaijan (AZE)	3	0	2	5
3	Spain (ESP)	2	0	2	4
4	Slovenia (SLO)	2	0	0	2
5	Russia (RUS)	1	5	7	13
6	Ukraine (UKR)	1	0	3	4
7	Montenegro (MNE)*	1	0	0	1
8	Germany (GER)	0	3	0	3
9	Turkey (TUR)	0	2	0	2
10	Italy (ITA)	0	1	1	2
11	Serbia (SRB)	0	1	0	1
12	Georgia (GEO)	0	0	2	2
12	Poland (POL)	0	0	2	2
12	Slovakia (SVK)	0	0	2	2
15	Croatia (CRO)	0	0	1	1
15	Estonia (EST)	0	0	1	1
15	Israel (ISR)	0	0	1	1
15	Netherlands (NED)	0	0	1	1
Totals (18 entries)		15	15	30	60
