= 2025 European Cadet Judo Championships =

Judo competition

Judo 2025 European Cadet Judo Championships
- Venue: Jane Sandanski Arena
- Location: Skopje, North Macedonia
- Dates: 26–29 June
- Competitors: 421 from 41 nations

Champions
- Mixed team: France (2nd title)

Competition at external databases
- Links: IJF • JudoInside

The 2025 European Cadet Judo Championships was held in Skopje, North Macedonia, from 26 to 29 June 2025 The last day of competition featured a mixed team event.

== Medal summary ==
=== Men's events ===
Event	Gold	Silver	Bronze
−50 kg	Anar Guliyev (AZE)	Julius Kitagawa (GER)	Ilia Toptygin (IJF)
−50 kg	Anar Guliyev (AZE)	Julius Kitagawa (GER)	Coen Gilbert (GBR)
−55 kg	Rasul Alizada (AZE)	Matteo Gualandi (ITA)	Artur Sarkisian (IJF)
−55 kg	Rasul Alizada (AZE)	Matteo Gualandi (ITA)	Titouan Lucas (FRA)
−60 kg	Zeyd Alasgarov (AZE)	Tsotne Ichkitidze (GEO)	Ferenc Fedora (HUN)
−60 kg	Zeyd Alasgarov (AZE)	Tsotne Ichkitidze (GEO)	Raffaele Sodano (ITA)
−66 kg	Rakhim Khamkhoev (IJF)	Tamerlan Nibo (IJF)	Tomáš Otevřel (CZE)
−66 kg	Rakhim Khamkhoev (IJF)	Tamerlan Nibo (IJF)	Georg Nõges (EST)
−73 kg	Veljko Varničić (SRB)	Adam Rusňák (CZE)	Vasil Gamezardashvili (GEO)
−73 kg	Veljko Varničić (SRB)	Adam Rusňák (CZE)	Siniša Miljić (SRB)
−81 kg	Giorgi Mumladze (GEO)	Timur Aliev (IJF)	Nikola Obradović (SRB)
−81 kg	Giorgi Mumladze (GEO)	Timur Aliev (IJF)	Tajus Babaičenko (LTU)
−90 kg	Majus Genys (LTU)	Abdula Suleimanov (IJF)	Apti Utsiev (IJF)
−90 kg	Majus Genys (LTU)	Abdula Suleimanov (IJF)	Dmitrijs Kolosovs (LAT)
+90 kg	Daniel Csermák (HUN)	Denis Kuligin (IJF)	Giorgi Karchaidze (GEO)
+90 kg	Daniel Csermák (HUN)	Denis Kuligin (IJF)	Ioane Abalaki (GEO)

=== Women's events ===
Event	Gold	Silver	Bronze
−40 kg	Sema Nur Yüksel (TUR)	Yağmur Yılmaztürk (TUR)	Fenne Peeters (BEL)
−40 kg	Sema Nur Yüksel (TUR)	Yağmur Yılmaztürk (TUR)	Emiliia Saifutdinova (IJF)
−44 kg	Nadezhda Mishenkina (IJF)	Livanur Kayır (TUR)	Sandra Walendzik (POL)
−44 kg	Nadezhda Mishenkina (IJF)	Livanur Kayır (TUR)	Gulshan Huseynova (AZE)
−48 kg	Barbara Twarowska (POL)	Narmin Aghamirzazade (AZE)	Leyla Alakbarova (AZE)
−48 kg	Barbara Twarowska (POL)	Narmin Aghamirzazade (AZE)	Aiora Martin Carriches (ESP)
−52 kg	Valeriia Kozlova (IJF)	Alice Lopez (FRA)	Giulia Bonzano (ITA)
−52 kg	Valeriia Kozlova (IJF)	Alice Lopez (FRA)	Polina Furman (IJF)
−57 kg	Sofia Pekki (FIN)	Elif Kılıç (TUR)	Maya Toszegi (GER)
−57 kg	Sofia Pekki (FIN)	Elif Kılıç (TUR)	Ekaterina Zhdanova (IJF)
−63 kg	Aishat Alieva (IJF)	Audren Guenneugues (FRA)	Nana Gulbiani (GEO)
−63 kg	Aishat Alieva (IJF)	Audren Guenneugues (FRA)	Chloé Jean (FRA)
−70 kg	Keti Robakidze (GEO)	Roksana Zyś (POL)	Giorgia Grassi (ITA)
−70 kg	Keti Robakidze (GEO)	Roksana Zyś (POL)	Ana Bešker (CRO)
+70 kg	Emma Feuillet-Nguimgo (FRA)	Astan Sacko (FRA)	Hatice Tuana Balcı (TUR)
+70 kg	Emma Feuillet-Nguimgo (FRA)	Astan Sacko (FRA)	Antea Ajduković (CRO)

=== Mixed ===
Event	Gold	Silver	Bronze
Mixed team	France	International Judo Federation	Belarus
Mixed team	France	International Judo Federation	Georgia

Source results:

=== Medal table ===
* Host nation (North Macedonia)

Rank	Nation	Gold	Silver	Bronze	Total
1	International Judo Federation (IJF)	4	5	6	15
2	Azerbaijan (AZE)	3	1	2	6
3	France (FRA)	2	3	2	7
4	Georgia (GEO)	2	1	5	8
5	Turkey (TUR)	1	3	1	5
6	Poland (POL)	1	1	1	3
7	Serbia (SRB)	1	0	2	3
8	Hungary (HUN)	1	0	1	2
8	Lithuania (LTU)	1	0	1	2
10	Finland (FIN)	1	0	0	1
11	Italy (ITA)	0	1	3	4
12	Czech Republic (CZE)	0	1	1	2
12	Germany (GER)	0	1	1	2
14	Croatia (CRO)	0	0	2	2
15	Belarus (BLR)	0	0	1	1
15	Belgium (BEL)	0	0	1	1
15	Estonia (EST)	0	0	1	1
15	Great Britain (GBR)	0	0	1	1
15	Latvia (LAT)	0	0	1	1
15	Spain (ESP)	0	0	1	1
Totals (20 entries)		17	17	34	68
