= 2022 World Judo Juniors Championships =

Judo competition

Judo 2022 World Judo Juniors Championships
- Venue: Arena Fedeguayas VPP
- Location: Guayaquil, Ecuador
- Dates: 10–14 August 2022
- Competitors: 373 from 63 nations
- Total prize money: 99,800€

Champions
- Mixed team: Japan (4th title)

Competition at external databases
- Links: IJF • JudoInside

The 2022 World Judo Juniors Championships was held in Guayaquil, Ecuador, from 10 to 14 August 2022 as part of the IJF World Tour and during the 2024 Summer Olympics qualification period. The final day of competition featured a mixed team event, won by team Japan.

== Schedule & event videos ==
The event aired on the IJF YouTube channel. Event draw was held on 9 August at 14:00. All times are local (UTC-5).

	Date	Weight classes	Preliminaries				Final Block	
	Date	Weight classes	Start time	Videos			Start time	Videos
Day 1	10 August	Men: –60, –66 Women: –48, –52	10:30	Commentated			16:00	Commentated
Day 1	10 August	Men: –60, –66 Women: –48, –52	10:30	Tatami 1	Tatami 2	Tatami 3	16:00	Commentated
Day 2	11 August	Men: –73 Women: –57, –63	11:30	Commentated			16:00	Commentated
Day 2	11 August	Men: –73 Women: –57, –63	11:30	Tatami 1	Tatami 2	Tatami 3	16:00	Commentated
Day 3	12 August	Men: –81, –90 Women: –70	11:30	Commentated			16:00	Commentated
Day 3	12 August	Men: –81, –90 Women: –70	11:30	Tatami 1	Tatami 2	Tatami 3	16:00	Commentated
Day 4	13 August	Men: –100, +100 Women: –78, +78	12:00	Commentated			16:00	Commentated
Day 4	13 August	Men: –100, +100 Women: –78, +78	12:00	Tatami 1	Tatami 2	Tatami 3	16:00	Commentated
Day 5	14 August	Mixed teams	12:30	Commentated			16:00	Commentated
Day 5	14 August	Mixed teams	12:30	Tatami 1	Tatami 2	Tatami 3	16:00	Commentated

=== Medal table ===
* Host nation (Ecuador)

Rank	Nation	Gold	Silver	Bronze	Total
1	Japan	7	2	2	11
2	Turkey	1	3	2	6
3	France	1	2	4	7
4	Italy	1	1	3	5
5	Uzbekistan	1	1	2	4
6	Spain	1	0	2	3
7	Netherlands	1	0	1	2
8	Moldova	1	0	0	1
8	Tajikistan	1	0	0	1
10	Georgia	0	2	2	4
11	Brazil	0	2	0	2
12	Cuba	0	1	2	3
13	Hungary	0	1	0	1
14	Germany	0	0	3	3
15	Azerbaijan	0	0	1	1
15	Czech Republic	0	0	1	1
15	Poland	0	0	1	1
15	Romania	0	0	1	1
15	Slovakia	0	0	1	1
15	Switzerland	0	0	1	1
15	United States	0	0	1	1
Totals (21 entries)		15	15	30	60

== Medal summary ==
Source Results

=== Men's events ===
Event	Gold	Silver	Bronze
Extra-lightweight (−60 kg)	Taiki Nakamura; Japan	Giorgi Sardalashvili; Georgia	Romain Valadier-Picard; France
Extra-lightweight (−60 kg)	Taiki Nakamura; Japan	Giorgi Sardalashvili; Georgia	Tornike Maziashvili; Georgia
Half-lightweight (−66 kg)	Nurali Emomali; Tajikistan	Azizbek Ortikov; Uzbekistan	Kimy Bravo; Cuba
Half-lightweight (−66 kg)	Nurali Emomali; Tajikistan	Azizbek Ortikov; Uzbekistan	Muhammed Demirel; Turkey
Lightweight (−73 kg)	Ryuga Tanaka; Japan	Giorgi Terashvili; Georgia	Jack Yonezuka; United States
Lightweight (−73 kg)	Ryuga Tanaka; Japan	Giorgi Terashvili; Georgia	Marcin Kowalski; Poland
Half-middleweight (−81 kg)	Mihail Latișev; Moldova	Arnaud Aregba; France	Adam Kopecký; Czech Republic
Half-middleweight (−81 kg)	Mihail Latișev; Moldova	Arnaud Aregba; France	Eljan Hajiyev; Azerbaijan
Middleweight (−90 kg)	Jakhongir Mamatrakhimov; Uzbekistan	Péter Sáfrány; Hungary	Aleksa Mitrovic; France
Middleweight (−90 kg)	Jakhongir Mamatrakhimov; Uzbekistan	Péter Sáfrány; Hungary	Alex Creţ; Romania
Half-heavyweight (−100 kg)	Kenny Liveze; France	Tomohiro Nakano; Japan	Kilian Kappelmeier; Germany
Half-heavyweight (−100 kg)	Kenny Liveze; France	Tomohiro Nakano; Japan	Benjamín Maťašeje; Slovakia
Heavyweight (+100 kg)	Yuta Nakamura; Japan	Omar Cruz; Cuba	Islombek Ravshankulov; Uzbekistan
Heavyweight (+100 kg)	Yuta Nakamura; Japan	Omar Cruz; Cuba	Shalva Gureshidze; Georgia

=== Women's events ===
Event	Gold	Silver	Bronze
Extra-lightweight (−48 kg)	Hikari Yoshioka; Japan	Assunta Scutto; Italy	Merve Azak; Turkey
Extra-lightweight (−48 kg)	Hikari Yoshioka; Japan	Assunta Scutto; Italy	Gema Gómez; Spain
Half-lightweight (−52 kg)	Giulia Carnà; Italy	Chloé Devictor; France	Binta Ndiaye; Switzerland
Half-lightweight (−52 kg)	Giulia Carnà; Italy	Chloé Devictor; France	Marina Castelló; Spain
Lightweight (−57 kg)	Özlem Yıldız; Turkey	Akari Omori; Japan	Veronica Toniolo; Italy
Lightweight (−57 kg)	Özlem Yıldız; Turkey	Akari Omori; Japan	Rin Eguchi; Japan
Half-middleweight (−63 kg)	Joanne van Lieshout; Netherlands	Kaillany Cardoso; Brazil	Melkia Auchecorne; France
Half-middleweight (−63 kg)	Joanne van Lieshout; Netherlands	Kaillany Cardoso; Brazil	Agnese Zucco; Italy
Middleweight (−70 kg)	Ai Tsunoda; Spain	Fidan Ögel; Turkey	Samira Bock; Germany
Middleweight (−70 kg)	Ai Tsunoda; Spain	Fidan Ögel; Turkey	Idelannis Gómez; Cuba
Half-heavyweight (−78 kg)	Aki Kuroda; Japan	Beatriz Freitas; Brazil	Iriskhon Kurbanbaeva; Uzbekistan
Half-heavyweight (−78 kg)	Aki Kuroda; Japan	Beatriz Freitas; Brazil	Lieke Derks; Netherlands
Heavyweight (+78 kg)	Mao Arai; Japan	Hilal Öztürk; Turkey	Miki Mukunoki; Japan
Heavyweight (+78 kg)	Mao Arai; Japan	Hilal Öztürk; Turkey	Erica Simonetti; Italy

=== Mixed ===
Source Results

Event	Gold	Silver	Bronze
Mixed team	Japan; Yamato Fukuda; Ryuga Tanaka; Kaito Amano; Junnosuke Todaka; Tomohiro Nakano; Yuta Nakamura; Ayumi Kawada; Akari Omori; Kurumi Ishioka; Miki Mukunoki; Mao Arai	Turkey; Muhammed Demirel; Cem Demirtaş; Münir Ertuğ; Ayşenur Karadağ; Özlem Yıldız; Habibe Afyonlu; Fidan Ögel; Hilal Öztürk	Germany; Levi Märkt; Jano Rübo; Tom Droste; George Udsilauri; Kilian Kappelmeier; Nicole Stakhov; Bettina Bauer; Sarah Mehlau; Samira Bock; Anna Monta Olek
Mixed team	Japan; Yamato Fukuda; Ryuga Tanaka; Kaito Amano; Junnosuke Todaka; Tomohiro Nakano; Yuta Nakamura; Ayumi Kawada; Akari Omori; Kurumi Ishioka; Miki Mukunoki; Mao Arai	Turkey; Muhammed Demirel; Cem Demirtaş; Münir Ertuğ; Ayşenur Karadağ; Özlem Yıldız; Habibe Afyonlu; Fidan Ögel; Hilal Öztürk	France; Driss Masson Kbilou; Daniyl Zoubko; Arnaud Aregba; Aleksa Mitrovic; Mathias Anglionin; Kenny Liveze; Chloe Devictor; Martha Fawaz; Melkia Auchecorne; Florine Soula; Oceana Zatchi Bi; Dounia Nacer

== Prize money ==
The sums written are per medalist, bringing the total prizes awarded to 79,800$ for the individual contests and 20,000$ for the team competition. (retrieved from:)

Medal	Individual			Mixed team		
Medal	Total	Judoka	Coach	Total	Judoka	Coach
Gold	2,500$	2,000$	500$	8,000$	6,400$	1,600$
Silver	1,500$	1,200$	300$	5,600$	4,480$	1,120$
Bronze	850$	680$	170$	3,200$	2,560$	640$
