= 2026 Judo Grand Slam Paris =

Judo competition

Judo 2026 Judo Grand Slam Paris
- Venue: Accor Arena
- Location: Paris, France
- Dates: 7–8 February 2026
- Competitors: 488 from 78 nations
- Total prize money: €154,000
- Website: Official website

Competition at external databases
- Links: IJF • JudoInside

The 2026 Judo Grand Slam Paris was held at the Accor Arena in Paris, France, from 7 to 8 February 2026 as part of the IJF World Tour.

== Medal summary ==
=== Men's events ===
Event	Gold	Silver	Bronze
Extra-lightweight (−60 kg)	Balabay Aghayev (AZE)	Dilshot Khalmatov (UKR)	Izhak Ashpiz (ISR)
Extra-lightweight (−60 kg)	Balabay Aghayev (AZE)	Dilshot Khalmatov (UKR)	Aman Bakytzhan (KAZ)
Half-lightweight (−66 kg)	Takeshi Takeoka (JPN)	Kim Chann-yeong (KOR)	Ruslan Pashayev (AZE)
Half-lightweight (−66 kg)	Takeshi Takeoka (JPN)	Kim Chann-yeong (KOR)	Kairi Kentoku (JPN)
Lightweight (−73 kg)	Makhmadbek Makhmadbekov (UAE)	Manuel Lombardo (ITA)	Muhiddin Asadulloev (TJK)
Lightweight (−73 kg)	Makhmadbek Makhmadbekov (UAE)	Manuel Lombardo (ITA)	Benjamin Levy (GBR)
Half-middleweight (−81 kg)	Yuhei Oino (JPN)	Zelim Tckaev (AZE)	Egor Sukhoparov (RUS)
Half-middleweight (−81 kg)	Yuhei Oino (JPN)	Zelim Tckaev (AZE)	Abylaikhan Zhubanazar (KAZ)
Middleweight (−90 kg)	Goki Tajima (JPN)	Hidetoshi Tokumochi (JPN)	Alexis Mathieu (FRA)
Middleweight (−90 kg)	Goki Tajima (JPN)	Hidetoshi Tokumochi (JPN)	Egor Andoni (RUS)
Half-heavyweight (−100 kg)	Dota Arai (JPN)	Anton Savytskiy (UKR)	Niyaz Bilalov (RUS)
Half-heavyweight (−100 kg)	Dota Arai (JPN)	Anton Savytskiy (UKR)	Nurlykhan Sharkhan (KAZ)
Heavyweight (+100 kg)	Kanta Nakano (JPN)	Hyōga Ōta (JPN)	Kim Min-jong (KOR)
Heavyweight (+100 kg)	Kanta Nakano (JPN)	Hyōga Ōta (JPN)	Jur Spijkers (NED)

=== Women's events ===
Event	Gold	Silver	Bronze
Extra-lightweight (−48 kg)	Shirine Boukli (FRA)	Zhuang Wenna (CHN)	Wakana Koga (JPN)
Extra-lightweight (−48 kg)	Shirine Boukli (FRA)	Zhuang Wenna (CHN)	Hui Xinran (CHN)
Half-lightweight (−52 kg)	Distria Krasniqi (KOS)	Ariane Toro (ESP)	Mascha Ballhaus (GER)
Half-lightweight (−52 kg)	Distria Krasniqi (KOS)	Ariane Toro (ESP)	Amandine Buchard (FRA)
Lightweight (−57 kg)	Sarah-Léonie Cysique (FRA)	Akari Omori (JPN)	Momo Tamaoki (JPN)
Lightweight (−57 kg)	Sarah-Léonie Cysique (FRA)	Akari Omori (JPN)	Faïza Mokdar (FRA)
Half-middleweight (−63 kg)	Rafaela Silva (BRA)	Lkhagvatogoogiin Enkhriilen (MGL)	Kirari Yamaguchi (JPN)
Half-middleweight (−63 kg)	Rafaela Silva (BRA)	Lkhagvatogoogiin Enkhriilen (MGL)	Joanne van Lieshout (NED)
Middleweight (−70 kg)	Szofi Özbas (HUN)	April Lynn Fohouo (SUI)	Rin Maeda (JPN)
Middleweight (−70 kg)	Szofi Özbas (HUN)	April Lynn Fohouo (SUI)	Ai Tsunoda (ESP)
Half-heavyweight (−78 kg)	Alice Bellandi (ITA)	Yelyzaveta Lytvynenko (UAE)	Liz Ngelebeya (FRA)
Half-heavyweight (−78 kg)	Alice Bellandi (ITA)	Yelyzaveta Lytvynenko (UAE)	Anna Monta Olek (GER)
Heavyweight (+78 kg)	Romane Dicko (FRA)	Julia Tolofua (FRA)	Léa Fontaine (FRA)
Heavyweight (+78 kg)	Romane Dicko (FRA)	Julia Tolofua (FRA)	Mao Arai (JPN)

=== Medal table ===
* Host nation (France)

Rank	Nation	Gold	Silver	Bronze	Total
1	Japan (JPN)	5	3	6	14
2	France (FRA)*	3	1	5	9
3	Azerbaijan (AZE)	1	1	1	3
4	Italy (ITA)	1	1	0	2
4	United Arab Emirates (UAE)	1	1	0	2
6	Brazil (BRA)	1	0	0	1
6	Hungary (HUN)	1	0	0	1
6	Kosovo (KOS)	1	0	0	1
9	Ukraine (UKR)	0	2	0	2
10	China (CHN)	0	1	1	2
10	South Korea (KOR)	0	1	1	2
10	Spain (ESP)	0	1	1	2
13	Mongolia (MGL)	0	1	0	1
13	Switzerland (SUI)	0	1	0	1
15	Kazakhstan (KAZ)	0	0	3	3
15	Russia (RUS)	0	0	3	3
17	Germany (GER)	0	0	2	2
17	Netherlands (NED)	0	0	2	2
19	Great Britain (GBR)	0	0	1	1
19	Israel (ISR)	0	0	1	1
19	Tajikistan (TJK)	0	0	1	1
Totals (21 entries)		14	14	28	56

== Prize money ==
The sums written are per medalist, bringing the total prizes awarded to €154,000. (retrieved from:)

Medal	Total	Judoka	Coach
Gold	€5,000	€4,000	€1,000
Silver	€3,000	€2,400	€600
Bronze	€1,500	€1,200	€300
