= 2020 European Junior Judo Championships =

Judo competition

Judo 2020 European Junior Judo Championships
- Venue: Sport Hall Intersport
- Location: Poreč, Croatia
- Dates: 4–6 November 2020
- Competitors: 356 from 37 nations

Competition at external databases
- Links: IJF • EJU • JudoInside

The 2020 European Junior Judo Championships was an edition of the European Junior Judo Championships, organised by the European Judo Union. It was held in Poreč, Croatia, from 4 to 6 November 2020.

== Medal summary ==
=== Medal table ===
* Host nation (Croatia)

Rank	Nation	Gold	Silver	Bronze	Total
1	Russia (RUS)	4	1	4	9
2	France (FRA)	3	1	3	7
3	Serbia (SRB)	2	0	1	3
4	Georgia (GEO)	1	1	1	3
5	Hungary (HUN)	1	0	2	3
6	Slovenia (SLO)	1	0	1	2
7	Czech Republic (CZE)	1	0	0	1
7	Poland (POL)	1	0	0	1
9	Netherlands (NED)	0	3	2	5
10	Ukraine (UKR)	0	3	1	4
11	Turkey (TUR)	0	1	3	4
12	Italy (ITA)	0	1	1	2
12	Portugal (POR)	0	1	1	2
12	Romania (ROU)	0	1	1	2
15	Kosovo (KOS)	0	1	0	1
16	Israel (ISR)	0	0	3	3
17	Croatia (CRO)*	0	0	1	1
17	Cyprus (CYP)	0	0	1	1
17	Spain (ESP)	0	0	1	1
17	Switzerland (SUI)	0	0	1	1
Totals (20 entries)		14	14	28	56

=== Men's events ===
Event	Gold	Silver	Bronze
Extra-lightweight (-60 kg)	Khetag Basaev (RUS)	Oleh Veredyba (UKR)	Romain Valadier-Picard (FRA)
Extra-lightweight (-60 kg)	Khetag Basaev (RUS)	Oleh Veredyba (UKR)	Salih Yıldız (TUR)
Half-lightweight (-66 kg)	Kazbek Naguchev (RUS)	Luka Kapanadze (GEO)	Abrek Naguchev (RUS)
Half-lightweight (-66 kg)	Kazbek Naguchev (RUS)	Luka Kapanadze (GEO)	Dániel Szegedi (HUN)
Lightweight (-73 kg)	Armen Agaian (RUS)	Khamzat Akhmarov (RUS)	Koen Heg (NED)
Lightweight (-73 kg)	Armen Agaian (RUS)	Khamzat Akhmarov (RUS)	Juš Mecilošek (SLO)
Half-middleweight (-81 kg)	David Karapetyan (RUS)	Artem Bubyr (UKR)	Tizie Gnamien (FRA)
Half-middleweight (-81 kg)	David Karapetyan (RUS)	Artem Bubyr (UKR)	Muhammet Koç (TUR)
Middleweight (-90 kg)	Francis Damier (FRA)	Alex Creţ (ROU)	Mansur Lorsanov (RUS)
Middleweight (-90 kg)	Francis Damier (FRA)	Alex Creţ (ROU)	Péter Sáfrány (HUN)
Half-heavyweight (-100 kg)	Ilia Sulamanidze (GEO)	Mert Şişmanlar (TUR)	Daniel Eich (SUI)
Half-heavyweight (-100 kg)	Ilia Sulamanidze (GEO)	Mert Şişmanlar (TUR)	Eduard Serban (ROU)
Heavyweight (+100 kg)	Richárd Sipőcz (HUN)	Yevheniy Balyevskyy (UKR)	Valeriy Endovitskiy (RUS)
Heavyweight (+100 kg)	Richárd Sipőcz (HUN)	Yevheniy Balyevskyy (UKR)	Saba Inaneishvili (GEO)

=== Women's events ===
Event	Gold	Silver	Bronze
Extra-lightweight (-48 kg)	Andrea Stojadinov (SRB)	Giulia Carnà (ITA)	Raquel Brito (POR)
Extra-lightweight (-48 kg)	Andrea Stojadinov (SRB)	Giulia Carnà (ITA)	Tamar Malca (ISR)
Half-lightweight (-52 kg)	Faïza Mokdar (FRA)	Naomi van Krevel (NED)	Sofia Asvesta (CYP)
Half-lightweight (-52 kg)	Faïza Mokdar (FRA)	Naomi van Krevel (NED)	Ana Viktorija Puljiz (CRO)
Lightweight (-57 kg)	Marica Perišić (SRB)	Ophélie Vellozzi (FRA)	Veronica Toniolo (ITA)
Lightweight (-57 kg)	Marica Perišić (SRB)	Ophélie Vellozzi (FRA)	Özlem Yıldız (TUR)
Half-middleweight (-63 kg)	Renata Zachová (CZE)	Laura Fazliu (KOS)	Anja Obradović (SRB)
Half-middleweight (-63 kg)	Renata Zachová (CZE)	Laura Fazliu (KOS)	Joanne Van Lieshout (NED)
Middleweight (-70 kg)	Katarzyna Sobierajska (POL)	Joana Crisóstomo (POR)	Shaked Amihai (ISR)
Middleweight (-70 kg)	Katarzyna Sobierajska (POL)	Joana Crisóstomo (POR)	Ai Tsunoda (ESP)
Half-heavyweight (-78 kg)	Metka Lobnik (SLO)	Kim Hooi (NED)	Inbar Lanir (ISR)
Half-heavyweight (-78 kg)	Metka Lobnik (SLO)	Kim Hooi (NED)	Habi Magassa (FRA)
Heavyweight (+78 kg)	Léa Fontaine (FRA)	Marit Kamps (NED)	Ruslana Bulavina (UKR)
Heavyweight (+78 kg)	Léa Fontaine (FRA)	Marit Kamps (NED)	Elis Startseva (RUS)

Source Results
