= 2019 European Cadet Judo Championships =

Judo competition

Judo 2019 European Cadet Judo Championships
- Venue: Torwar Hall
- Location: Warsaw, Poland
- Dates: 27–30 June 2019
- Competitors: 431 from 39 nations

Champions
- Mixed team: Turkey (1st title)

Competition at external databases
- Links: IJF • JudoInside

The 2019 European Cadet Judo Championships is an edition of the European Cadet Judo Championships, organised by the International Judo Federation. It was held at the Arena COS Torwar in Warsaw, Poland from 27 to 30 June 2019. The final day of competition featured a mixed team event, won by team Turkey.

== Medal summary ==
=== Medal table ===
* Host nation (Poland)

Rank	Nation	Gold	Silver	Bronze	Total
1	Italy (ITA)	4	1	2	7
2	Russia (RUS)	2	2	8	12
3	Turkey (TUR)	2	1	2	5
4	France (FRA)	2	0	2	4
5	Georgia (GEO)	1	1	2	4
6	Spain (ESP)	1	1	0	2
7	Azerbaijan (AZE)	1	0	3	4
8	Czech Republic (CZE)	1	0	1	2
9	Armenia (ARM)	1	0	0	1
9	Belgium (BEL)	1	0	0	1
11	Hungary (HUN)	0	2	1	3
12	Ukraine (UKR)	0	2	0	2
13	Romania (ROU)	0	1	3	4
14	Bulgaria (BUL)	0	1	1	2
15	Austria (AUT)	0	1	0	1
15	Latvia (LAT)	0	1	0	1
15	Moldova (MDA)	0	1	0	1
15	Portugal (POR)	0	1	0	1
19	Netherlands (NED)	0	0	2	2
20	Belarus (BLR)	0	0	1	1
20	Croatia (CRO)	0	0	1	1
20	Greece (GRE)	0	0	1	1
20	Poland (POL)*	0	0	1	1
20	Serbia (SRB)	0	0	1	1
Totals (24 entries)		16	16	32	64

=== Men's events ===
Event	Gold	Silver	Bronze
−50 kg	Romain Valadier-Picard (FRA)	Mykyta Holoborodko (UKR)	Nika Bachiashvili (GEO)
−50 kg	Romain Valadier-Picard (FRA)	Mykyta Holoborodko (UKR)	Alexandru Matei (ROU)
−55 kg	Vincenzo Skenderi (ITA)	Bence Farkas (HUN)	Kamran Suleymanov (AZE)
−55 kg	Vincenzo Skenderi (ITA)	Bence Farkas (HUN)	Nijat Mammadli (AZE)
−60 kg	Turan Bayramov (AZE)	Muhammed Demirel (TUR)	Andarbek Arsunukaev (RUS)
−60 kg	Turan Bayramov (AZE)	Muhammed Demirel (TUR)	Rizvan Magomadov (RUS)
−66 kg	Adam Tsechoev (RUS)	Saikhan Shabikhanov (RUS)	Michail Tsoutlasvili (GRE)
−66 kg	Adam Tsechoev (RUS)	Saikhan Shabikhanov (RUS)	Mo van Dun (NED)
−73 kg	Adam Kopecký (CZE)	Luigi Centracchio (ITA)	Dzianis Yauseyenka (BLR)
−73 kg	Adam Kopecký (CZE)	Luigi Centracchio (ITA)	Aleksandar Rajičić (SRB)
−81 kg	Ikhvan Edilsultanov (RUS)	Tymur Valieiev (UKR)	Mikhail Avdeev (RUS)
−81 kg	Ikhvan Edilsultanov (RUS)	Tymur Valieiev (UKR)	Péter Sáfrány (HUN)
−90 kg	Kenny Liveze (FRA)	Dzhavad Guseinov (RUS)	Tornike Poladishvili (GEO)
−90 kg	Kenny Liveze (FRA)	Dzhavad Guseinov (RUS)	Daniele Accogli (ITA)
+90 kg	Giga Tatiashvili (GEO)	Irakli Demetrashvili (GEO)	Akhmed Magomadov (RUS)
+90 kg	Giga Tatiashvili (GEO)	Irakli Demetrashvili (GEO)	Huseyn Mammedov (AZE)

=== Women's events ===
Event	Gold	Silver	Bronze
−40 kg	Susanna Stepanyan (ARM)	Luca Mamira (HUN)	Giorgia Hagianu (ROU)
−40 kg	Susanna Stepanyan (ARM)	Luca Mamira (HUN)	Pauline Cuq (FRA)
−44 kg	Hanife Özcan (TUR)	Anastasiia Balaban (BUL)	Aya Louchene (FRA)
−44 kg	Hanife Özcan (TUR)	Anastasiia Balaban (BUL)	Tereza Bodnárová (CZE)
−48 kg	Assunta Scutto (ITA)	Raquel Brito (POR)	Ana Viktorija Puljiz (CRO)
−48 kg	Assunta Scutto (ITA)	Raquel Brito (POR)	Iasmina Covaciu (ROU)
−52 kg	Veronica Toniolo (ITA)	Anika Schicho (AUT)	Liliia Nugaeva (RUS)
−52 kg	Veronica Toniolo (ITA)	Anika Schicho (AUT)	Mariam Amkhadova (RUS)
−57 kg	Özlem Yıldız (TUR)	Florentina Ivănescu (ROU)	Kseniia Galitskaia (RUS)
−57 kg	Özlem Yıldız (TUR)	Florentina Ivănescu (ROU)	Natalia Elkina (RUS)
−63 kg	Alessia Corrao (BEL)	Laura Vázquez (ESP)	Lidia Brancheva (BUL)
−63 kg	Alessia Corrao (BEL)	Laura Vázquez (ESP)	Ayten Yeksan (TUR)
−70 kg	Ai Tsunoda (ESP)	Una Dolgiļeviča (LAT)	Katarzyna Sobierajska (POL)
−70 kg	Ai Tsunoda (ESP)	Una Dolgiļeviča (LAT)	Yael van Heemst (NED)
+70 kg	Erica Simonetti (ITA)	Oxana Diacenco (MDA)	Asya Tavano (ITA)
+70 kg	Erica Simonetti (ITA)	Oxana Diacenco (MDA)	Hilal Ozturk (TUR)

Source Results

=== Mixed ===
Event	Gold	Silver	Bronze
Mixed team	Turkey	Romania	Netherlands
Mixed team	Turkey	Romania	Russia

Source Results
