= 2021 World Judo Juniors Championships – Mixed team =

Judo competition

Judo Mixed Team at the 2021 World Judo Juniors Championships
- Venue: Geopalace
- Location: Obelia, Italy
- Date: 10 October
- Nations: 14

Medalists
gold medal	France (1st title)
silver medal	Russia
bronze medal	Turkey
bronze medal	Germany

Competition at external databases
- Links: IJF • JudoInside

The 2021 World Judo Mixed Team Juniors Championships was held in Obelia, Italy on 10 October as part of the 2021 World Judo Juniors Championships.

== Results ==
Round of 16
Tunisia	3
Ukraine	4
Italy	4
Kazakhstan	1
Russia	4
India	0
Kenya	0
Brazil	4
Germany	4
Uzbekistan	0
Hungary	4
Netherlands	3

Quarter-finals
France	4
Ukraine	1
Turkey	4
Italy	1
Russia	4
Brazil	2
Germany	4
Hungary	2

Semi-finals
France	4
Turkey	1
Russia	4
Germany	1

Final
France	4
Russia	0

=== Repechage ===
Repechage
Ukraine	4
Italy	2

Bronze medal
Ukraine	3
Germany	4

Repechage
Brazil	2
Hungary	4

Bronze medal
Hungary	2
Turkey	4
