= 2019 World Judo Cadets Championships =

Judo competition

Judo 2019 World Judo Cadets Championships
- Venue: Baluan Sholak Palace of Culture and Sports
- Location: Almaty, Kazakhstan
- Dates: 25–29 September 2019
- Competitors: 460 from 61 nations
- Total prize money: 100,000€

Champions
- Mixed team: Japan (1st title)

Competition at external databases
- Links: IJF • JudoInside

The 2019 World Judo Cadets Championships is an edition of the World Judo Cadets Championships, organised by the International Judo Federation. It was held in Almaty, Kazakhstan from 25 to 29 September 2019. The final day of competition featured a mixed team event, won by team Japan.

== Medal summary ==
=== Medal table ===
* Host nation (Kazakhstan)

Rank	Nation	Gold	Silver	Bronze	Total
1	Japan (JPN)	4	3	4	11
2	Turkey (TUR)	2	1	1	4
3	Russia (RUS)	1	2	4	7
4	Kazakhstan (KAZ)*	1	1	4	6
5	Brazil (BRA)	1	1	2	4
5	France (FRA)	1	1	2	4
5	Italy (ITA)	1	1	2	4
8	Georgia (GEO)	1	1	1	3
9	Hungary (HUN)	1	0	1	2
10	Chinese Taipei (TPE)	1	0	0	1
10	Czech Republic (CZE)	1	0	0	1
10	Spain (ESP)	1	0	0	1
13	Ukraine (UKR)	0	2	1	3
14	Azerbaijan (AZE)	0	1	1	2
14	Croatia (CRO)	0	1	1	2
16	Venezuela (VEN)	0	1	0	1
17	Netherlands (NED)	0	0	3	3
18	Belgium (BEL)	0	0	1	1
18	Germany (GER)	0	0	1	1
18	Israel (ISR)	0	0	1	1
18	Kyrgyzstan (KGZ)	0	0	1	1
18	Uzbekistan (UZB)	0	0	1	1
Totals (22 entries)		16	16	32	64

=== Men's events ===
Event	Gold	Silver	Bronze
−50 kg	Nurkanat Serikbayev (KAZ)	Romain Valadier-Picard (FRA)	Mykyta Holoborodko (UKR)
−50 kg	Nurkanat Serikbayev (KAZ)	Romain Valadier-Picard (FRA)	Nika Bachiashvili (GEO)
−55 kg	Lin Chong-you (TPE)	Yuma Sato (JPN)	Vincenzo Skenderi (ITA)
−55 kg	Lin Chong-you (TPE)	Yuma Sato (JPN)	Sobirjon Karimov (UZB)
−60 kg	Keiji Tsujioka (JPN)	Kamran Suleymanov (AZE)	Chyngyzkhan Sagynaliev (KGZ)
−60 kg	Keiji Tsujioka (JPN)	Kamran Suleymanov (AZE)	Marlen Adil (KAZ)
−66 kg	Abrek Naguchev (RUS)	Rostyslav Berezhnyi (UKR)	Matheus Pereira (BRA)
−66 kg	Abrek Naguchev (RUS)	Rostyslav Berezhnyi (UKR)	Tilegen Tynarbay (KAZ)
−73 kg	Adam Kopecký (CZE)	Musa Simsek (TUR)	Alexandre Tama (FRA)
−73 kg	Adam Kopecký (CZE)	Musa Simsek (TUR)	Vugar Talibov (AZE)
−81 kg	Ryunosuke Otake (JPN)	Tymur Valieiev (UKR)	Ikhvan Edilsultanov (RUS)
−81 kg	Ryunosuke Otake (JPN)	Tymur Valieiev (UKR)	Aidar Arapov (KAZ)
−90 kg	Kenny Liveze (FRA)	Dzhavad Guseinov (RUS)	Junnosuke Todaka (JPN)
−90 kg	Kenny Liveze (FRA)	Dzhavad Guseinov (RUS)	Roy Sivan (ISR)
+90 kg	Irakli Demetrashvili (GEO)	Giga Tatiashvili (GEO)	Nodar Onoprienko (RUS)
+90 kg	Irakli Demetrashvili (GEO)	Giga Tatiashvili (GEO)	Mitsuki Sugawara (JPN)

=== Women's events ===
Event	Gold	Silver	Bronze
−40 kg	Luca Mamira (HUN)	Chiara Antonina Dispenza (ITA)	Pauline Cuq (FRA)
−40 kg	Luca Mamira (HUN)	Chiara Antonina Dispenza (ITA)	Alima Zhumagaliyeva (KAZ)
−44 kg	Merve Azak (TUR)	María Giménez (VEN)	Laura Soken (BRA)
−44 kg	Merve Azak (TUR)	María Giménez (VEN)	Ayuna Miyagi (JPN)
−48 kg	Hikari Yoshioka (JPN)	Ana Viktorija Puljiz (CRO)	Assunta Scutto (ITA)
−48 kg	Hikari Yoshioka (JPN)	Ana Viktorija Puljiz (CRO)	Anna Kriza (HUN)
−52 kg	Veronica Toniolo (ITA)	Liliia Nugaeva (RUS)	Mariam Amkhadova (RUS)
−52 kg	Veronica Toniolo (ITA)	Liliia Nugaeva (RUS)	Elin Henninger (NED)
−57 kg	Rin Eguchi (JPN)	Sarah Souza (BRA)	Kseniia Galitskaia (RUS)
−57 kg	Rin Eguchi (JPN)	Sarah Souza (BRA)	Alexe Wagemaker (NED)
−63 kg	Habibe Afyonlu (TUR)	Airi Yazawa (JPN)	Alessia Corrao (BEL)
−63 kg	Habibe Afyonlu (TUR)	Airi Yazawa (JPN)	Katarina Krišto (CRO)
−70 kg	Ai Tsunoda (ESP)	Moka Kuwagata (JPN)	Yael Van Heemst (NED)
−70 kg	Ai Tsunoda (ESP)	Moka Kuwagata (JPN)	Elisabeth Pflugbeil (GER)
+70 kg	Anna Santos (BRA)	Madina Paragulgova (KAZ)	Hilal Ozturk (TUR)
+70 kg	Anna Santos (BRA)	Madina Paragulgova (KAZ)	Ion Yamaki (JPN)

Source Results

=== Mixed ===
Event	Gold	Silver	Bronze
Mixed team	Japan	Azerbaijan	Russia
Mixed team	Japan	Azerbaijan	Turkey

Source Results

== Prize money ==
The sums written are per medalist, bringing the total prizes awarded to 80,000$ for the individual contests and 20,000$ for the team competition. (retrieved from:)

Medal	Individual			Mixed team
Medal	Total	Judoka	Coach	Total
Gold	2,300$	1,840$	460$	8,000$
Silver	1,300$	1,040$	260$	5,600$
Bronze	700$	560$	140$	3,200$
