= 2021 European Junior Mixed Team Judo Championships =

Judo competition

Judo Mixed Team at the 2021 European Junior Judo Championships
- Venue: Coque
- Location: Luxembourg City, Luxembourg
- Date: 12 September
- Nations: 11

Medalists
gold medal	France
silver medal	Turkey
bronze medal	Russia
bronze medal	Netherlands

Competition at external databases
- Links: IJF • JudoInside

The 2021 European Junior Mixed Team Judo Championships was held in Luxembourg City, Luxembourg on 12 September as part of the 2021 European Junior Judo Championships.

== Results ==
Round of 16
Ukraine	1
Netherlands	4
Turkey	4
Hungary	1
Israel	2
Poland	4

Quarter-finals
Russia	4
Netherlands	0
Germany	2
Turkey	4
Georgia	4
Portugal	3
France	4
Poland	2

Semi-finals
Russia	3
Turkey	4
Georgia	1
France	4

Final
Turkey	0
France	4

=== Repechage ===
Repechage
Netherlands	4
Germany	1

Bronze medal
Netherlands	4
Georgia	2

Repechage
Portugal	0
Poland	4

Bronze medal
Poland	1
Russia	4
