= European Junior Judo Championships =

Judo competition

- Current event or competition: 2026 European Junior Judo Championships

Competition details
- Discipline: Judo
- Type: Annual
- Organiser: European Judo Union (EJU)

History
- First edition: 1960 in Amsterdam, Netherlands
- Editions: 67
- Most recent: Podgorica 2026
- Next edition: Tbilisi 2027

The European Junior Judo Championships are annual judo competitions organized by the European Judo Union for European judoka aged 20_{until 2012}/21_{since 2013} and younger.

The last contest took place in Podgorica, Montenegro.

== Competitions ==
Edition	Year	Dates	City and host country	Venue	# Countries	# Athletes	Ref.
1	1960	14–15 May	Amsterdam, Netherlands				
2	1961	10– March	Milan, Italy				
3	1962		Essen, West Germany				
4	1963	10 May	Geneva, Switzerland				
5	1964	25–26 April	Berlin, East Germany				
6	1965	13 May	Scheveningen, Netherlands				
7	1966	19–20 March	Lyon, France				
8	1967	1–2 April	Lisbon, Portugal				
9	1968	9–10 March	London, United Kingdom				
10	1969	21–22 March	West Berlin, West Germany				
11	1970	14– March	Bordeaux, France				
12	1971	13 March	Naples, Italy				
13	1972	11–12 March	Leningrad, Soviet Union				
14	1973	10–11 March	Ostend, Belgium				
15	1974	15–16 November	Tel Aviv, Israel				
16	1975	15–16 November	Turku, Finland				
17	1976	13–14 November	Łódź, Poland				
18	1977	5–6 November	Berlin, East Germany				
19	1978	15–19 November	Miskolc, Hungary				
20	1979	1–4 November	Edinburgh, Scotland				
21	1980	14–16 November	Lisbon, Portugal				
22	1981	30 Oct – 1 Nov	San Marino, San Marino				
23	1982	29–31 October	Târgoviște, Romania				
24	1983	11–13 November	Arnhem, Netherlands				
25	1984	2–4 November	Cádiz, Spain				
26	1985	15–17 November	Delémont, Switzerland				
27	1986	7–9 November	Leonding, Austria				
28	1987	5–8 November	Wrocław, Poland				
29	1988	24–27 November	Vienna, Austria				
30	1989	23–26 November	Athens, Greece				
31	1990	15–18 November	Ankara, Turkey				
32	1991	14–17 November	Pieksämäki, Finland				
33	1992	23–26 November	Jerusalem, Israel				
34	1993	18–21 November	Arnhem, Netherlands				
35	1994	17–20 November	Lisbon, Portugal				
36	1995	16–19 November	Valladolid, Spain				
37	1996	14–17 November	Monte Carlo, Monaco				
38	1997	13–16 November	Ljubljana, Slovenia				
39	1998	19–22 November	Bucharest, Romania				
40	1999	19–21 November	Rome, Italy				
41	2000	8–10 December	Nicosia, Cyprus				
42	2001	16–18 November	Budapest, Hungary				
43	2002	14–17 November	Rotterdam, Netherlands				
44	2003	21–23 November	Sarajevo, Bosnia and Herzegovina				
45	2004	10–12 September	Sofia, Bulgaria				
46	2005	30 Sep – 7 Oct	Zagreb, Croatia				
47	2006	8–10 September	Tallinn, Estonia				
48	2007	5–7 October	Prague, Czech Republic				
49	2008	12–14 September	Warsaw, Poland				
50	2009	11–13 September	Yerevan, Armenia				
51	2010	17–19 September	Samokov, Bulgaria				
52	2011	16–18 September	Lommel, Belgium	Arena De Soeverein			
53	2012	21–23 September	Poreč, Croatia	Žatika Sport Centre			
54	2013	20–22 September	Sarajevo, Bosnia and Herzegovina	Zetra Olympic Hall			
55	2014	19–21 September	Bucharest, Romania	Polyvalent Hall	40	409	
56	2015	18–20 September	Oberwart, Austria	Burgenlandhalle Exhibition Hall	41	396	
57	2016	16–18 September	Málaga, Spain	José María Martín Carpena Arena	41	405	
58	2017	15–17 September	Maribor, Slovenia	Ljudski vrt Sports Hall	41	402	
59	2018	13–16 September	Sofia, Bulgaria	Asics Arena Sports Hall	42	404	
60	2019	12–15 September	Vantaa, Finland	Energia Areena	44	342	
61	2020	4–6 November	Poreč, Croatia	Intersport Hall	37	356	
62	2021	9–12 September	Luxembourg, Luxembourg	d'Coque	43	351	
63	2022	15–18 September	Prague, Czech Republic	UNYP Arena	39	349	
64	2023	7–10 September	The Hague, Netherlands	Sportcampus Zuiderpark	43	366	
65	2024	5–8 September	Tallinn, Estonia	Unibet Arena	39	373	
66	2025	4–7 September	Bratislava, Slovakia	Gopass Arena	43	364	
67	2026	3–6 September	Podgorica, Montenegro	Voco Sports Hall	44	400	
68	2027	2–5 September	(Georgia (country)) Tbilisi, Georgia				

== Team competitions ==
Men's team
Year	Gold	Silver	Bronze		Ref.
2014	Georgia	Ukraine	France	Germany	
2015	Russia	Germany	Georgia	Belarus	
2016	Georgia	Azerbaijan	Italy	Russia	
2017	Azerbaijan	Georgia	Great Britain	Russia	

Women's team
Year	Gold	Silver	Bronze		Ref.
2014	Croatia	France	Russia	Italy	
2015	France	Slovenia	Russia	Germany	
2016	Germany	Russia	Croatia	France	
2017	France	Netherlands	Russia	Germany	

Mixed team
Year	Gold	Silver	Bronze		Ref.
2018	Russia	France	Germany	Netherlands	
2019	Russia	Italy	Germany	Georgia	
2021	France	Turkey	Russia	Netherlands	
2022	France	Turkey	Georgia	Azerbaijan	
2023	Georgia	Netherlands	France	Portugal	
2024	Azerbaijan	France	Netherlands	Serbia	
2025	France	Turkey	Switzerland	Germany	
2026	France	Russia	Georgia	Ukraine	

== See also ==
- European Judo Championships
- European U23 Judo Championships
- European Cadet Judo Championships
