= European Cadet Judo Championships =

Judo competition

- Current event or competition: 2026 European Cadet Judo Championships

Competition details
- Discipline: Judo
- Type: Annual
- Organiser: European Judo Union (EJU)

History
- First edition: Essen 1962
- Editions: 42
- Most recent: Las Palmas 2026
- Next edition: Rome 2027

The European Cadet Judo Championships are annual judo competitions organized by the European Judo Union for European judoka aged 18 and younger.

The last contest took place in Las Palmas, Gran Canaria, Spain. The next will take place in Rome, Italy.

== Competitions ==
Edition	Year	Dates	City and host country	Venue	# Countries	# Athletes	Ref.
1	1962		Essen, West Germany				
2	1963	10– May	Geneva, Switzerland				
3	1964	26 April	Berlin, East Germany				
4	1965	24– April	Scheveningen, Netherlands				
5	1966	19–20 March	Lyon, France				
6	1967	1–2 April	Lisbon, Portugal				
7	1968	9–10 March	London, United Kingdom				
8	1969	21 March	West Berlin, West Germany				
9	1970	14– March	Bordeaux, France				
10	1971	12 March	Naples, Italy				
11	1972	11–12 March	Leningrad, Soviet Union				
12	1973	10–11 March	Ostend, Belgium				
13	1974	14–15 November	Tel Aviv, Israel				
14	1975	16 November	Turku, Finland				
15	1976	13–14 November	Łódź, Poland				
16	1977	5–6 November	Berlin, East Germany				
17	1978	15–19 November	Miskolc, Hungary				
18	2000	21–22 July	Oradea, Romania				
19	2002	29–30 June	Győr, Hungary				
20	2003	23–24 August	Baku, Azerbaijan				
21	2004	3–4 July	Rotterdam, Netherlands				
22	2005	18–19 June	Salzburg, Austria				
23	2006	23–25 June	Miskolc, Hungary				
24	2007	6–8 July	Valletta, Malta				
25	2008	4–6 July	Sarajevo, Bosnia and Herzegovina				
26	2009	26–28 June	Koper, Slovenia	Arena Bonifika			
27	2010	25–27 June	Teplice, Czech Republic	Na Stínadlech			
28	2011	24–26 June	Cottonera, Malta	Cottonera Sports Complex			
29	2012	22–24 June	Bar, Montenegro	Stadion Topolica			
30	2013	21–23 June	Tallinn, Estonia	Saku Suurhall			
31	2014	4–6 July	Athens, Greece	Ano Liosia Olympic Hall	43	429	
32	2015	3–5 July	Sofia, Bulgaria	Armeets Arena	41	469	
33	2016	1–3 July	Vantaa, Finland	Energia Areena	41	421	
34	2017	30 Jun – 2 Jul	Kaunas, Lithuania	Žalgiris Arena	42	430	
35	2018	28 Jun – 1 Jul	Sarajevo, Bosnia and Herzegovina	Zetra Olympic Hall	42	457	
36	2019	27–30 June	Warsaw, Poland	Arena COS Torwar	39	431	
37	2021	17–19 August	Riga, Latvia	Arena Riga	37	391	
38	2022	23–26 June	Poreč, Croatia	Sport Hall Intersport	40	420	
39	2023	22–25 June	Odivelas, Portugal	Sports complex Multiusos de Odivelas	40	404	
40	2024	27–30 June	Sofia, Bulgaria	Asics Arena	44	511	
41	2025	26–29 June	Skopje, North Macedonia	Jane Sandanski Arena	41	421	
42	2026	29 June – 2 July	Las Palmas, Gran Canaria, Spain	Gran Canaria Arena	43	425	
43	2027		Rome, Italy				

== Team competitions ==
Men's team
Year	Gold	Silver	Bronze		Ref.
2015	Georgia	Netherlands	France	Russia	
2016	Georgia	Hungary	France	Russia	
2017	Georgia	Hungary	Italy	Russia	

Women's team
Year	Gold	Silver	Bronze		Ref.
2015	Russia	Croatia	France	Serbia	
2016	France	Serbia	Croatia	Netherlands	
2017	Germany	Serbia	Russia	France	

Mixed team
Year	Gold	Silver	Bronze		Ref.
2018	Russia	Netherlands	Turkey	Romania	
2019	Turkey	Romania	Netherlands	Russia	
2022	Ukraine	France	Azerbaijan	Georgia	
2023	Azerbaijan	France	Turkey	Georgia	
2024	France	Turkey	Germany	Poland	
2025	France	IJF	Belarus	Georgia	
2026	France	Ukraine	Slovenia	Georgia	

== See also ==
- European Judo Championships
- European U23 Judo Championships
- European Junior Judo Championships
