= 2024 European Judo Championships – Mixed team =

Judo Mixed team at the 2024 European Judo Championships
- Venue: Arena Zagreb
- Location: Zagreb, Croatia
- Date: 28 April 2024
- Competitors: 104 from 11 nations

Medalists
gold medal	Joan-Benjamin Gaba; Maxime Gobert; Eniel Caroly; Alexis Mathieu; Mathéo Akiana Mongo; Khamzat Saparbaev; Priscilla Gneto; Faïza Mokdar; Margaux Pinot; Florine Soula; Léa Fontaine; Julia Tolofua	France
silver medal	Giorgi Chikhelidze; Lasha Shavdatuashvili; Lasha Bekauri; Giorgi Jabniashvili; Saba Inaneishvili; Guram Tushishvili; Eteri Liparteliani; Nino Loladze; Eter Askilashvili; Mariam Tchanturia; Nino Gulbani; Sophio Somkhishvili	Georgia
bronze medal	Strahinja Bunčić; Filip Jovanović; Darko Brašnjović; Nemanja Majdov; Bojan Došen; Igor Vračar; Marica Perišić; Andrea Stojadinov; Jovana Bunčić; Jovana Čakarević; Milica Cvijić; Milica Žabić	Serbia
bronze medal	Jano Rübo; Johann Lenz; Johannes Frey; Jana Ziegler; Samira Bock; Renée Lucht; Anna Monta Olek	Germany

Champions
- Mixed team: France (2nd title)

Competition at external databases
- Links: IJF • JudoInside

The mixed team event at the 2024 European Judo Championships was held at the Arena Zagreb in Zagreb, Croatia, on 28 April 2024.

== Participants ==
10 Nations and 1 IJF Refugee Team will participate in the 2024 Mixed Team Judo Championships. The selected Judoka are:

Teams	Men			Women		
Teams	‍–‍73 kg	‍–‍90 kg	+90 kg	‍–‍57 kg	‍–‍70 kg	+70 kg
Austria	Samuel Gaßner; Lukas Reiter	Bernd Fasching	Laurin Boehler; Movli Borchashvilli	Laura Kallinger; Verena Hiden	Magdalena Krssakova	Maria Höllwart
Bulgaria	Mark Hristov; Denislav Ivanov	Georgi Gramatikov; Ivaylo Ivanov	Daniel Dichev; Boris Georgiev	Ivelina Ilieva; Snezhana Gramatikova	Lidia Brancheva; Yoana Manova	Irina Zhelezarska
Croatia	Robert Klačar	Josip Bulić; Dominik Družeta	Marko Kumrić; Zlatko Kumrić	Dora Bortas; Tihea Topolovec	Lara Cvjetko; Barbara Matić	Ivana Šutalo; Helena Vuković
France	Joan-Benjamin Gaba; Maxime Gobert	Eniel Caroly; Alexis Mathieu	Mathéo Akiana Mongo; Khamzat Saparbaev	Priscilla Gneto; Faïza Mokdar	Margaux Pinot; Florine Soula	Léa Fontaine; Julia Tolofua
Georgia	Giorgi Chikhelidze; Lasha Shavdatuashvili	Lasha Bekauri; Giorgi Jabniashvili	Saba Inaneishvili; Guram Tushishvili	Eteri Liparteliani; Nino Loladze	Eter Askilashvili; Mariam Tchanturia	Nino Gulbani; Sophio Somkhishvili
Germany	Jano Rübo	Johann Lenz	Johannes Frey	Jana Ziegler	Samira Bock	Renée Lucht; Anna Monta Olek
Hungary	Bence Pongrácz; Dániel Szegedi	Roland Gőz	Levente Dobos	Róza Gyertyás	Jennifer Czerlau	Nikolett Sági
IJF Refugee Team	Kavan Majidi; Mohammad Rashnonezhad	Sibghatullah Arab	Adnan Khankan	Muna Dahouk	Nigara Shaheen	Mahboubeh Barbari Zharfi
Italy	Edoardo Mella; Manuel Parlati	Lorenzo Rigano	Kwadjo Anani; Nicholas Mungai	T-D Capanni Dias	Martina Esposito; Irene Pedrotti	Erica Simonetti; Giorgia Stangherlin
Netherlands	Koen Heg	Ian van Herk	Simeon Catharina; Jelle Snippe	Pleuni Cornelisse	Margit de Voogd	Carmen Dijkstra
Serbia	Strahinja Bunčić; Filip Jovanović	Darko Brašnjović; Nemanja Majdov	Bojan Došen; Igor Vračar	Marica Perišić; Andrea Stojadinov	Jovana Bunčić; Jovana Čakarević	Milica Cvijić; Milica Žabić

== Results ==
=== Main draw ===
Round of 16
Austria	4
Bulgaria	0
Hungary	0
Serbia	4
Italy	4
IJF Refugee Team	1

Quarter-finals
France	4
Austria	0
Germany	4
Serbia	1
Netherlands	2
Croatia	4
Georgia	4
Italy	3

Semi-finals
France	4
Germany	2
Croatia	1
Georgia	4

Final
France	4
Georgia	0

Source results:

=== Repechage ===
Repechage
Austria	2
Serbia	4
Netherlands	2
Italy	4

Bronze medal
Serbia	4
Croatia	2
Italy	1
Germany	4

Source results:

== Matches ==
=== Round of 16 ===
==== Austria vs Bulgaria ====
Weight Class	Austria	Result	Bulgaria	Score
Men –90 kg	Bernd Fasching	11 – 00	Georgi Gramatikov	1 – 0
Women +70 kg	Maria Höllwart	10 (yellow card) – 00	Irina Zhelezarska	2 – 0
Men +90 kg	Laurin Boehler	10 (yellow card) – 00	Daniel Dichev	3 – 0
Women –57 kg	Laura Kallinger	01 – 00	Ivelina Ilieva	4 – 0
Men –73 kg	Samuel Gaßner	—	Denislav Ivanov	—
Women –70 kg	Magdalena Krssakova	—	Yoana Manova	—

==== Hungary vs Serbia ====
Weight Class	Hungary	Result	Serbia	Score
Men –90 kg	Roland Gőz	00 – 01 (yellow card)	Darko Brašnjović	0 – 1
Women +70 kg	Nikolett Sági	00 – 10	Milica Žabić	0 – 2
Men +90 kg	Levente Dobos	00 – 10	Bojan Došen	0 – 3
Women –57 kg	Róza Gyertyás	00 – 10	Marica Perišić	0 – 4
Men –73 kg	Dániel Szegedi	—	Strahinja Bunčić	—
Women –70 kg	Jennifer Czerlau	—	Jovana Čakarević	—

==== Italy vs International Judo Federation Refugee Team ====
Weight Class	Italy	Result	IJF	Score
Men –90 kg	Lorenzo Rigano	02 – 00	Sibghatullah Arab	1 – 0
Women +70 kg	Erica Simonetti	02 – 00	Mahboubeh Barbari Zharfi	2 – 0
Men +90 kg	Kwadjo Anani	00 – 10	Adnan Khankan	2 – 1
Women –57 kg	Thauany David Capanni Dias	10 – 00	Muna Dahouk	3 – 1
Men –73 kg	Edoardo Mella	11 (yellow card) – 00	Mohammad Rashnonezhad	4 – 1
Women –70 kg	Martina Esposito	—	Nigara Shaheen	—

=== Quarter-finals ===
==== France vs Austria ====
Weight Class	France	Result	Austria	Score
Women +70 kg	Léa Fontaine	10 (yellow card) – 00	Maria Höllwart	1 – 0
Men +90 kg	Khamzat Saparbaev	10 – 00	Movli Borchashvilli	2 – 0
Women –57 kg	Priscilla Gneto	10 – 00	Verena Hiden	3 – 0
Men –73 kg	Joan-Benjamin Gaba	10 (yellow card) – 00	Lukas Reiter	4 – 0
Women –70 kg	Margaux Pinot	—	Magdalena Krssakova	—
Men –90 kg	Alexis Mathieu	—	Bernd Fasching	—

==== Germany vs Serbia ====
Weight Class	Germany	Result	Serbia	Score
Women +70 kg	Anna Monta Olek	02 – 00 (yellow card)	Milica Žabić	1 – 0
Men +90 kg	Johannes Frey	11 – 00 (yellow card)	Bojan Došen	2 – 0
Women –57 kg	Jana Ziegler	00 – 01 (yellow card)	Marica Perišić	2 – 1
Men –73 kg	Jano Rübo	01 (yellow card) – 00 (yellow card)	Strahinja Bunčić	3 – 1
Women –70 kg	Samira Bock	10 (yellow card) – 00	Jovana Čakarević	4 – 1
Men –90 kg	Johann Lenz	—	Darko Brašnjović	—

==== Netherlands vs Croatia ====
Weight Class	Netherlands	Result	Croatia	Score
Women +70 kg	Carmen Dijkstra	00 – 01	Helena Vuković	0 – 1
Men +90 kg	Simeon Catharina	10 – 00 H	~~Marko Kumrić~~	1 – 1
Women –57 kg	Pleuni Cornelisse	00 – 10 (yellow card)	Tihea Topolovec	1 – 2
Men –73 kg	Koen Heg	01 (yellow card) – 00 (yellow card)	Robert Klačar	2 – 2
Women –70 kg	Margit de Voogd	01 – 10 (yellow card)	Lara Cvjetko	2 – 3
Men –90 kg	Ian van Herk	00 – 10	Dominik Družeta	2 – 4

==== Georgia vs Italy ====
Weight Class	Georgia	Result	Italy	Score
Women +70 kg	Sophio Somkhishvili	00 (yellow card) – 01	Erica Simonetti	0 – 1
Men +90 kg	Guram Tushishvili	10 (yellow card) – 00 (yellow card)	Nicholas Mungai	1 – 1
Women –57 kg	Eteri Liparteliani	00 (yellow card) – 01	Thauany David Capanni Dias	1 – 2
Men –73 kg	Lasha Shavdatuashvili	01 (yellow card) – 00	Manuel Parlati	2 – 2
Women –70 kg	Mariam Tchanturia	00 – 10	Irene Pedrotti	2 – 3
Men –90 kg	Lasha Bekauri	10 – 00	Lorenzo Rigano	3 – 3
Men –90 kg	Lasha Bekauri	10 – 00	Lorenzo Rigano	4 – 3

=== Repechages ===
==== Austria vs Serbia ====
Weight Class	Austria	Result	Serbia	Score
Men +90 kg	Laurin Boehler	00 – 10	Bojan Došen	0 – 1
Women –57 kg	Laura Kallinger	00 – 10 (yellow card)	Marica Perišić	0 – 2
Men –73 kg	Samuel Gaßner	10 – 00	Filip Jovanović	1 – 2
Women –70 kg	Magdalena Krssakova	10 – 00 (yellow card)	Jovana Bunčić	2 – 2
Men –90 kg	Bernd Fasching	00 (yellow card) – 10	Darko Brašnjović	2 – 3
Women +70 kg	Maria Höllwart	00 – 02	Milica Žabić	2 – 4

==== Netherlands vs Italy ====
Weight Class	Netherlands	Result	Italy	Score
Men +90 kg	Jelle Snippe	02 (yellow card) – 00 (yellow card)	Kwadjo Anani	1 – 0
Women –57 kg	Pleuni Cornelisse	00 – 10 (yellow card)	Thauany David Capanni Dias	1 – 1
Men –73 kg	Koen Heg	00 – 10 (yellow card)	Edoardo Mella	1 – 2
Women –70 kg	Margit de Voogd	11 – 00	Irene Pedrotti	2 – 2
Men –90 kg	Ian van Herk	00 – 10	Lorenzo Rigano	2 – 3
Women +70 kg	Carmen Dijkstra	00 – 10 (yellow card)	Giorgia Stangherlin	2 – 4

=== Semi-finals ===
==== France vs Germany ====
Weight Class	France	Result	Germany	Score
Men +90 kg	Mathéo Akiana Mongo	00 (yellow card) – 10 (yellow card)	Johannes Frey	0 – 1
Women –57 kg	Faïza Mokdar	11 – 00	Jana Ziegler	1 – 1
Men –73 kg	Joan-Benjamin Gaba	00 – 01	Jano Rübo	1 – 2
Women –70 kg	Margaux Pinot	01 – 00	Samira Bock	2 – 2
Men –90 kg	Alexis Mathieu	02 – 00	Johann Lenz	3 – 2
Women +70 kg	Léa Fontaine	10 – 00	Renée Lucht	4 – 2

==== Croatia vs Georgia ====
Weight Class	Croatia	Result	Georgia	Score
Men +90 kg	Josip Bulić	00 – 10 (yellow card)	Guram Tushishvili	0 – 1
Women –57 kg	Tihea Topolovec	00 – 10	Eteri Liparteliani	0 – 2
Men –73 kg	Robert Klačar	00 (yellow card) – 11 (yellow card)	Lasha Shavdatuashvili	0 – 3
Women –70 kg	Lara Cvjetko	10 – 00	Mariam Tchanturia	1 – 3
Men –90 kg	Dominik Družeta	00 (yellow card) – 02	Lasha Bekauri	1 – 4
Women +70 kg	Ivana Šutalo	—	Sophio Somkhishvili	—

=== Bronze medal matches ===
==== Serbia vs Croatia ====
Weight Class	Serbia	Result	Croatia	Score
Women –57 kg	Marica Perišić	10 – 00 (yellow card)	Tihea Topolovec	1 – 0
Men –73 kg	Filip Jovanović	00 – 10	Robert Klačar	1 – 1
Women –70 kg	Jovana Čakarević	00 (yellow card) – 10	Lara Cvjetko	1 – 2
Men –90 kg	Darko Brašnjović	10 – 00 (yellow card)	Dominik Družeta	2 – 2
Women +70 kg	Milica Žabić	01 – 00	Helena Vuković	3 – 2
Men +90 kg	Bojan Došen	02 – 00	Zlatko Kumrić	4 – 2

==== Italy vs Germany ====
Weight Class	Italy	Result	Germany	Score
Women –57 kg	Thauany David Capanni Dias	01 – 00 (yellow card)	Jana Ziegler	1 – 0
Men –73 kg	Manuel Parlati	00 – 10	Jano Rübo	1 – 1
Women –70 kg	Martina Esposito	00 (yellow card) – 01 (yellow card)	Samira Bock	1 – 2
Men –90 kg	Lorenzo Rigano	00 – 10	Johann Lenz	1 – 3
Women +70 kg	Giorgia Stangherlin	00 (yellow card) – 10	Anna Monta Olek	1 – 4
Men +90 kg	Nicholas Mungai	—	Johannes Frey	—

=== Gold medal match – France vs Georgia ===
Weight Class	France	Result	Georgia	Score
Women –57 kg	Faïza Mokdar	10 – 00	Eteri Liparteliani	1 – 0
Men –73 kg	Joan-Benjamin Gaba	01 (yellow card) – 00	Lasha Shavdatuashvili	2 – 0
Women –70 kg	Margaux Pinot	10 – 00	Mariam Tchanturia	3 – 0
Men –90 kg	Alexis Mathieu	10 (yellow card) – 00 H	Lasha Bekauri	4 – 0
Women +70 kg	Léa Fontaine	—	Sophio Somkhishvili	—
Men +90 kg	Mathéo Akiana Mongo	—	Guram Tushishvili	—
