= 2023 European Mixed Team Judo Championships =

Judo Mixed team at the 2023 European Games
- Venue: Krynica-Zdrój Arena
- Location: Krynica-Zdrój, Poland
- Date: 1 July 2023
- Competitors: 204 from 22 nations

Medalists
gold medal	Eter Askilashvili; Lasha Bekauri; Beka Gviniashvili; Eteri Liparteliani; Lasha Shavdatuashvili; Sophio Somkhishvili; Georgi Terashvili; Guram Tushishvili; Gela Zaalishvili	Georgia
silver medal	Erik Abramov; Seija Ballhaus; Miriam Butkereit; Losseni Kone; Renée Lucht; Martin Matijass; Jano Rübo; Pauline Starke; Eduard Trippel	Germany
bronze medal	Pleuni Cornelisse; Frank de Wit; Koen Heg; Hilde Jager; Marit Kamps; Michael Korrel; Jesper Smink; Jelle Snippe; Karen Stevenson; Sanne van Dijke	Netherlands
bronze medal	Kwadjo Anani; Cecilia Betemps; Thauany David Capanni Dias; Luigi Centracchio; Odette Giuffrida; Edoardo Mella; Nicholas Mungai; Christian Parlati; Irene Pedrotti; Gennaro Pirelli; Giorgia Stangherlin; Asya Tavano	Italy

Champions
- Mixed team: Georgia (2nd title)

Competition at external databases
- Links: IJF • JudoInside

The 2023 European Mixed Team Judo Championships were held at the Krynica-Zdrój Arena in Krynica-Zdrój, Poland on 1 July 2023. The mixed team event was the only judo event at the 2023 European Games, which are styled Kraków-Małopolska 2023.

The Championship is conducted as a knockout competition, with each match consisting of six bouts, between judoka of the same weight and sex category. The first team to win four bouts progresses. If scores are tied 3–3 at the end of the match, a single extra bout is held, with two of the judoka having a rematch of their original bout. The Championships employ a repechage system, whereby teams defeated in earlier rounds continue to compete for the opportunity to face the losing semi-finalists for bronze medals.

== Participants ==
22 Nations will participate in the 2023 Mixed Team Judo Championships. The selected Judoka are:

Teams	Men			Women		
Teams	‍–‍73 kg	‍–‍90 kg	+90 kg	‍–‍57 kg	‍–‍70 kg	+70 kg
Austria	Samuel Gaßner; Lukas Reiter	Thomas Scharfetter	Movli Borchashvilli; Aaron Fara	Verena Hiden	Elena Dengg; Michaela Polleres	Maria Höllwart
Azerbaijan	Rashid Mammadaliyev; Nariman Mirzayev	Eljan Hajiyev; Vugar Talibov	Dzhamal Gamzatkhanov; Imran Yusifov	Fidan Alizada	Sudaba Aghayeva; Gunel Hasanli	Narmin Amirli; Nigar Suleymanova
Bulgaria	Mark Hristov	Georgi Gramatikov	Daniel Dichev	Ivelina Ilieva	Lidia Brancheva	Irina Zhelezarska
Croatia	Robert Klačar	Josip Bulić	Marko Kumrić	Tihea Topolovec	Anđela Violić	Tina Radić
Czech Republic	Chusniddin Karimov	Adam Kopecký	Michal Horák	Anna Marie Polnická	Julie Zárybnická	Markéta Paulusová
France	Benjamin Axus; Orlando Cazorla	M-G Ngayap Hambou; Loris Tassier	Emre Sanal; Joseph Terhec	Sarah-Léonie Cysique; Priscilla Gneto	Kaïla Issoufi; Margaux Pinot	Stessie Bastareaud; Sama Hawa Camara
Georgia	Lasha Shavdatuashvili; Georgi Terashvili	Lasha Bekauri; Beka Gviniashvili	Guram Tushishvili; Gela Zaalishvili	Eteri Liparteliani	Eter Askilashvili	Sophio Somkhishvili
Germany	Jano Rübo	Martin Matijass; Eduard Trippel	Erik Abramov; Losseni Kone	Seija Ballhaus; Pauline Starke	Miriam Butkereit	Renée Lucht
Greece	Dimitrios Giannopoulos; Michail Tsoutlasvili	Theodoros Demourtsidis; Theodoros Tselidis	Panagiotis Papanikolaou	Evangelia Gavala; Christina Papadopoulou	Alexandra Papagiannaki; Elisavet Teltsidou	Aliki Alexandridi; Maria-Nicoleta Vulpasin
Hungary	Áron Szabó; Dániel Szegedi	Roland Gőz; Péter Sáfrány	Miklós Cirjenics; Richárd Sipőcz	Róza Gyertyás; Réka Pupp	Szabina Gercsák	Jennifer Czerlau; Nikolett Sági
Israel	Yehonatan Elbaz; Oron Giner	Roy Sivan; Nadav Zurat	Daniel Bershadsky	Romi Dori; Maya Leopold	Gaya Bar Or; Maya Kogan	Shoshana Kahlon; Yuli Alma Mishiner
Italy	Luigi Centracchio; Edoardo Mella	Nicholas Mungai; Christian Parlati	Kwadjo Anani; Gennaro Pirelli	Thauany David Capanni Dias; Odette Giuffrida	Cecilia Betemps; Irene Pedrotti	Giorgia Stangherlin; Asya Tavano
Lithuania	Kostas Butkus; Kęstutis Vitkauskas	Augustas Šlyteris	Ignas Mečajus	Vaiga Čečytė	Ugnė Pileckaitė; Aida Vasiliauskaitė	Miglė Julija Dudėnaitė; Sandra Jablonskytė
Netherlands	Koen Heg	Frank de Wit; Jesper Smink	Michael Korrel; Jelle Snippe	Pleuni Cornelisse	Hilde Jager; Sanne van Dijke	Marit Kamps; Karen Stevenson
Poland	Ksawery Morka; Adam Stodolski	Paweł Drzymał; Damian Stępień	Jakub Sordyl; Kacper Szczurowski	Julia Kowalczyk; Arleta Podolak	Katarzyna Sobierajska; Eliza Wróblewska	Kinga Wolszczak; Anna Załęczna
Portugal	João Crisóstomo; Saba Danelia	Diogo Luís	Diogo Brites; Vasco Rompão	Ana Agulhas	Taís Pina	Beatriz Moreira; Carolina Paiva
Romania	Ioan Dziţac; Alexandru Raicu	Alex Creţ	Mircea Croitoru; Asley González	Alexandra Pop	Florentina Ivănescu; Serafima Moscalu	Alexandra Mazilu
Serbia	Strahinja Bunčić; Filip Jovanović	Darko Brašnjović; Nemanja Majdov	Bojan Došen; Igor Vračar	Marica Perišić	Jovana Bunčić; Tea Tintor	Milica Cvijić; Milica Žabić
Slovenia	Adrian Gomboc; Nace Herkovič	Narsej Lackovič; Alen Vucina	Vito Dragič; Enej Marinič	Ana Škrabl; Maša Slavinec	Nika Koren; Anka Pogačnik	Urška Torkar
Spain	José Antonio Aranda	Daniel Nieto; Aarón Santamaría Rodríguez	Irinel Chelaru	Jaione Equisoain; Adriana Rodríguez Salvador	Cristina Cabaña	Eunate Etxebarria
Turkey	Umalt Demirel; Bayram Kandemir	Ömer Aydın	Münir Ertuğ	Hasret Bozkurt; Ayşenur Budak	Minel Akdeniz; Fidan Ögel	Kübranur Esir; Hilal Öztürk
Ukraine	Bogdan Iadov; Vladyslav Kazimirov	Artem Bubyr; Stanislav Gunchenko	Yevheniy Balyevskyy; Andrii Kolesnyk	Daria Bilodid; Anastasiia Chyzhevska	Anastasiia Antipina; Yuliia Hrebenozhko	Ruslana Bulavina; Yelyzaveta Lytvynenko

== Bracket ==
The full bracket will be drawn during the Championships.

First round
Azerbaijan	4
Czech Republic	1
Serbia	1
Romania	4
Lithuania	1
Croatia	4
Austria	4
Spain	3
Hungary	4
Ukraine	1
Bulgaria	1
Portugal	4

Round of 16
France	4
Azerbaijan	0
Romania	0
Italy	4
Israel	1
Turkey	4
Croatia	1
Georgia	4
Germany	4
Austria	1
Hungary	4
Poland	1
Netherlands	4
Slovenia	1
Portugal	4
Greece	1

Quarter-finals
France	3
Italy	4
Turkey	1
Georgia	4
Germany	4
Hungary	3
Netherlands	4
Portugal	0

Semi-finals
Italy	3
Georgia	4
Germany	4
Netherlands	2

Final
Georgia	4
Germany	1

=== Repechage ===
Repechage
France	4
Turkey	0
Hungary	3
Portugal	4

Bronze medal
France	1
Netherlands	4
Portugal	0
Italy	4

== Matches ==
=== First round ===
==== Azerbaijan vs Czech Republic ====
Weight Class	Azerbaijan	Result	Czech Republic	Score
Men –73 kg	Rashid Mammadaliyev	01 – 00	Chusniddin Karimov	1 – 0
Women –70 kg	Gunel Hasanli	01 – 00	Julie Zárybnická	2 – 0
Men –90 kg	Vugar Talibov	01 – 00	Adam Kopecký	3 – 0
Women +70 kg	Nigar Suleymanova	00 – 10	Markéta Paulusová	3 – 1
Men +90 kg	Dzhamal Gamzatkhanov	10 – 00	Michal Horák	4 – 1
Women –57 kg	Fidan Alizada	—	Anna Marie Polnická	—
Results

==== Serbia vs Romania ====
Weight Class	Serbia	Result	Romania	Score
Men –73 kg	Filip Jovanović	00 – 02	Alexandru Raicu	0 – 1
Women –70 kg	Jovana Bunčić	00 – 10	Serafima Moscalu	0 – 2
Men –90 kg	Darko Brašnjović	00 – 10	Alex Creţ	0 – 3
Women +70 kg	Milica Žabić	10 – 00	Alexandra Mazilu	1 – 3
Men +90 kg	Bojan Došen	00 – 01	Asley González	1 – 4
Women –57 kg	Marica Perišić	—	Alexandra Pop	—
Results

==== Lithuania vs Croatia ====
Weight Class	Lithuania	Result	Croatia	Score
Men –73 kg	Kęstutis Vitkauskas	00 (yellow card) – 10	Robert Klačar	0 – 1
Women –70 kg	Aida Vasiliauskaitė	00 – 01	Anđela Violić	0 – 2
Men –90 kg	Augustas Šlyteris	00 (yellow card) – 11	Josip Bulić	0 – 3
Women +70 kg	Miglė Julija Dudėnaitė	00 – 02	Tina Radić	0 – 4
Men +90 kg	Ignas Mečajus	—	Marko Kumrić	—
Women –57 kg	Vaiga Čečytė	w/o –	-none Women –57 kg-	1 – 4
Results

==== Austria vs Spain ====
Weight Class	Austria	Result	Spain	Score
Men –73 kg	Samuel Gaßner	02 (yellow card) – 00	José Antonio Aranda	1 – 0
Women –70 kg	Michaela Polleres	00 – 10	Cristina Cabaña	1 – 1
Men –90 kg	Thomas Scharfetter	10 (yellow card) – 00	Daniel Nieto	2 – 1
Women +70 kg	Maria Höllwart	00 – 01	Eunate Etxebarria	2 – 2
Men +90 kg	Aaron Fara	10 – 00 (yellow card)	Irinel Chelaru	3 – 2
Women –57 kg	Verena Hiden	00 (yellow card) – 10	Adriana Rodríguez Salvador	3 – 3
Women +70 kg	Maria Höllwart	10 (yellow card) – 00	Eunate Etxebarria	4 – 3
Results

==== Hungary vs Ukraine ====
Weight Class	Hungary	Result	Ukraine	Score
Men –73 kg	Dániel Szegedi	11 – 01	Vladyslav Kazimirov	1 – 0
Women –70 kg	Szabina Gercsák	02 – 00 (yellow card)	Yuliia Hrebenozhko	2 – 0
Men –90 kg	Roland Gőz	10 – 00	Artem Bubyr	3 – 0
Women +70 kg	Nikolett Sági	00 – 02	Yelyzaveta Lytvynenko	3 – 1
Men +90 kg	Richárd Sipőcz	10 – 00	Yevheniy Balyevskyy	4 – 1
Women –57 kg	Réka Pupp	—	Daria Bilodid	—
Results

==== Bulgaria vs Portugal ====
Weight Class	Bulgaria	Result	Portugal	Score
Men –73 kg	Mark Hristov	00 – 01 (yellow card)	João Crisóstomo	0 – 1
Women –70 kg	Lidia Brancheva	00 – 10	Taís Pina	0 – 2
Men –90 kg	Georgi Gramatikov	11 – 00	Diogo Luís	1 – 2
Women +70 kg	Irina Zhelezarska	00 – 10	Carolina Paiva	1 – 3
Men +90 kg	Daniel Dichev	00 – 10	Diogo Brites	1 – 4
Women –57 kg	Ivelina Ilieva	—	Ana Agulhas	—
Results

=== Round of 16 ===
==== France vs Azerbaijan ====
Weight Class	France	Result	Azerbaijan	Score
Women –70 kg	Margaux Pinot	11 – 00	Gunel Hasanli	1 – 0
Men –90 kg	Maxime-Gaël Ngayap Hambou	11 – 00 (yellow card)	Vugar Talibov	2 – 0
Women +70 kg	Sama Hawa Camara	02 – 00 (yellow card)	Nigar Suleymanova	3 – 0
Men +90 kg	Joseph Terhec	01 (yellow card) – 00	Dzhamal Gamzatkhanov	4 – 0
Women –57 kg	Priscilla Gneto	—	Fidan Alizada	—
Men –73 kg	Benjamin Axus	—	Rashid Mammadaliyev	—
Results

==== Romania vs Italy ====
Weight Class	Romania	Result	Italy	Score
Women –70 kg	Serafima Moscalu	00 – 01 (yellow card)	Irene Pedrotti	0 – 1
Men –90 kg	Alex Creţ	00 – 11	Christian Parlati	0 – 2
Women +70 kg	Alexandra Mazilu	00 (yellow card) – 11	Asya Tavano	0 – 3
Men +90 kg	Asley González	00 – 10	Gennaro Pirelli	0 – 4
Women –57 kg	Alexandra Pop	—	Thauany David Capanni Dias	—
Men –73 kg	Alexandru Raicu	—	Edoardo Mella	—
Results

==== Israel vs Türkiye ====
Weight Class	Israel	Result	Turkey	Score
Women –70 kg	Gaya Bar Or	00 – 10	Fidan Ögel	0 – 1
Men –90 kg	Nadav Zurat	00 – 01	Ömer Aydın	0 – 2
Women +70 kg	Yuli Alma Mishiner	11 – 01 (yellow card)	Kübranur Esir	1 – 2
Men +90 kg	Daniel Bershadsky	00 – 02	Münir Ertuğ	1 – 3
Women –57 kg	Maya Leopold	00 – 10	Hasret Bozkurt	1 – 4
Men –73 kg	Yehonatan Elbaz	—	Bayram Kandemir	—
Results

==== Croatia vs Georgia ====
Weight Class	Croatia	Result	Georgia	Score
Women –70 kg	Anđela Violić	01 (yellow card) – 00 (yellow card)	Eter Askilashvili	1 – 0
Men –90 kg	Josip Bulić	00 (yellow card) – 01 (yellow card)	Lasha Bekauri	1 – 1
Women +70 kg	Tina Radić	00 – 02	Sophio Somkhishvili	1 – 2
Men +90 kg	Marko Kumrić	00 (yellow card) – 11 (yellow card)	Guram Tushishvili	1 – 3
Women –57 kg	-none Women –57 kg-	– w/o	Eteri Liparteliani	1 – 4
Men –73 kg	Robert Klačar	—	Lasha Shavdatuashvili	—
Results

==== Germany vs Austria ====
Weight Class	Germany	Result	Austria	Score
Women –70 kg	Miriam Butkereit	10 (yellow card) – 00	Michaela Polleres	1 – 0
Men –90 kg	Martin Matijass	00 (yellow card) – 10	Thomas Scharfetter	1 – 1
Women +70 kg	Renée Lucht	10 – 00	Maria Höllwart	2 – 1
Men +90 kg	Erik Abramov	02 – 00	Aaron Fara	3 – 1
Women –57 kg	Pauline Starke	10 – 00 (yellow card)	Verena Hiden	4 – 1
Men –73 kg	Jano Rübo	—	Lukas Reiter	—
Results

==== Hungary vs Poland ====
Weight Class	Hungary	Result	Poland	Score
Women –70 kg	Szabina Gercsák	01 – 00 (yellow card)	Eliza Wróblewska	1 – 0
Men –90 kg	Péter Sáfrány	01 – 00	Damian Stępień	2 – 0
Women +70 kg	Jennifer Czerlau	10 – 00	Kinga Wolszczak	3 – 0
Men +90 kg	Richárd Sipőcz	00 (yellow card) – 01	Kacper Szczurowski	3 – 1
Women –57 kg	Réka Pupp	01 – 00	Julia Kowalczyk	4 – 1
Men –73 kg	Áron Szabó	—	Adam Stodolski	—
Results

==== Netherlands vs Slovenia ====
Weight Class	Netherlands	Result	Slovenia	Score
Women –70 kg	Sanne van Dijke	10 – 00 (yellow card)	Anka Pogačnik	1 – 0
Men –90 kg	Frank de Wit	10 – 00	Narsej Lackovič	2 – 0
Women +70 kg	Karen Stevenson	01 (yellow card) – 00	Urška Torkar	3 – 0
Men +90 kg	Michael Korrel	00 – 10	Vito Dragič	3 – 1
Women –57 kg	Pleuni Cornelisse	02 – 00	Ana Škrabl	4 – 1
Men –73 kg	Koen Heg	—	Adrian Gomboc	—
Results

==== Portugal vs Greece ====
Weight Class	Portugal	Result	Greece	Score
Women –70 kg	Taís Pina	01 (yellow card) – 00	Alexandra Papagiannaki	1 – 0
Men –90 kg	Diogo Luís	00 – 10 (yellow card)	Theodoros Tselidis	1 – 1
Women +70 kg	Carolina Paiva	02 – 00	Aliki Alexandridi	2 – 1
Men +90 kg	Diogo Brites	10 – 00	Panagiotis Papanikolaou	3 – 1
Women –57 kg	Ana Agulhas	02 – 00 (yellow card)	Evangelia Gavala	4 – 1
Men –73 kg	João Crisóstomo	—	Michail Tsoutlasvili	—
Results

=== Quarter-finals ===
==== France vs Italy ====
Weight Class	France	Result	Italy	Score
Men –90 kg	Maxime-Gaël Ngayap Hambou	02 – 00	Nicholas Mungai	1 – 0
Women +70 kg	Sama Hawa Camara	10 – 00	Asya Tavano	2 – 0
Men +90 kg	Joseph Terhec	00 – 10	Gennaro Pirelli	2 – 1
Women –57 kg	Priscilla Gneto	00 – 10	Odette Giuffrida	2 – 2
Men –73 kg	Benjamin Axus	01 – 10	Edoardo Mella	2 – 3
Women –70 kg	Margaux Pinot	10 – 00	Irene Pedrotti	3 – 3
Women –57 kg	Priscilla Gneto	00 – 10	Odette Giuffrida	3 – 4
Results

==== Türkiye vs Georgia ====
Weight Class	Turkey	Result	Georgia	Score
Men –90 kg	Ömer Aydın	00 (yellow card) – 10	Lasha Bekauri	0 – 1
Women +70 kg	Hilal Öztürk	01 – 00	Sophio Somkhishvili	1 – 1
Men +90 kg	Münir Ertuğ	00 – 10 (yellow card)	Guram Tushishvili	1 – 2
Women –57 kg	Hasret Bozkurt	00 – 02	Eteri Liparteliani	1 – 3
Men –73 kg	Umalt Demirel	00 – 10 (yellow card)	Lasha Shavdatuashvili	1 – 4
Women –70 kg	Fidan Ögel	—	Eter Askilashvili	—
Results

==== Germany vs Hungary ====
Weight Class	Germany	Result	Hungary	Score
Men –90 kg	Martin Matijass	00 – 10 (yellow card)	Roland Gőz	0 – 1
Women +70 kg	Renée Lucht	00 – 10	Jennifer Czerlau	0 – 2
Men +90 kg	Erik Abramov	01 (yellow card) – 00 (yellow card)	Richárd Sipőcz	1 – 2
Women –57 kg	Seija Ballhaus	11 – 00	Róza Gyertyás	2 – 2
Men –73 kg	Jano Rübo	10 (yellow card) – 00	Áron Szabó	3 – 2
Women –70 kg	Miriam Butkereit	00 – 01	Szabina Gercsák	3 – 3
Women –57 kg	Seija Ballhaus	01 – 00	Róza Gyertyás	4 – 3
Results

==== Netherlands vs Portugal ====
Weight Class	Netherlands	Result	Portugal	Score
Men –90 kg	Jesper Smink	11 – 00	Diogo Luís	1 – 0
Women +70 kg	Marit Kamps	02 – 00 (yellow card)	Carolina Paiva	2 – 0
Men +90 kg	Jelle Snippe	02 (yellow card) – 00 (yellow card)	Vasco Rompão	3 – 0
Women –57 kg	Pleuni Cornelisse	01 – 00	Ana Agulhas	4 – 0
Men –73 kg	Koen Heg	—	João Crisóstomo	—
Women –70 kg	Hilde Jager	—	Taís Pina	—
Results

=== Repechages ===
==== France vs Türkiye ====
Weight Class	France	Result	Turkey	Score
Women +70 kg	Sama Hawa Camara	01 (yellow card) – 00	Hilal Öztürk	1 – 0
Men +90 kg	Emre Sanal	02 (yellow card) – 00	Münir Ertuğ	2 – 0
Women –57 kg	Sarah-Léonie Cysique	10 (yellow card) – 00 (yellow card)	Hasret Bozkurt	3 – 0
Men –73 kg	Orlando Cazorla	10 – 00	Umalt Demirel	4 – 0
Women –70 kg	Margaux Pinot	—	Fidan Ögel	—
Men –90 kg	Maxime-Gaël Ngayap Hambou	—	Ömer Aydın	—
Results

==== Hungary vs Portugal ====
Weight Class	Hungary	Result	Portugal	Score
Women +70 kg	Jennifer Czerlau	00 – 10	Carolina Paiva	0 – 1
Men +90 kg	Miklós Cirjenics	10 – 01	Diogo Brites	1 – 1
Women –57 kg	Réka Pupp	11 – 00 (yellow card)	Ana Agulhas	2 – 1
Men –73 kg	Dániel Szegedi	01 (yellow card) – 10	João Crisóstomo	2 – 2
Women –70 kg	Szabina Gercsák	00 (yellow card) – 01 (yellow card)	Taís Pina	2 – 3
Men –90 kg	Roland Gőz	10 – 00 (yellow card)	Diogo Luís	3 – 3
Men +90 kg	Miklós Cirjenics	00 – 01	Diogo Brites	3 – 4
Results

=== Semi-finals ===
==== Italy vs Georgia ====
Weight Class	Italy	Result	Georgia	Score
Women +70 kg	Asya Tavano	00 – 01	Sophio Somkhishvili	0 – 1
Men +90 kg	Gennaro Pirelli	10 (yellow card) – 00	Guram Tushishvili	1 – 1
Women –57 kg	Thauany David Capanni Dias	10 – 00	Eteri Liparteliani	2 – 1
Men –73 kg	Edoardo Mella	00 (yellow card) – 01	Lasha Shavdatuashvili	2 – 2
Women –70 kg	Irene Pedrotti	02 – 00	Eter Askilashvili	3 – 2
Men –90 kg	Christian Parlati	00 – 02	Lasha Bekauri	3 – 3
Men +90 kg	Gennaro Pirelli	00 (yellow card) – 01	Guram Tushishvili	3 – 4
Results

==== Germany vs Netherlands ====
Weight Class	Germany	Result	Netherlands	Score
Women +70 kg	Renée Lucht	02 (yellow card) – 00	Karen Stevenson	1 – 0
Men +90 kg	Losseni Kone	00 – 10	Michael Korrel	1 – 1
Women –57 kg	Pauline Starke	10 – 00	Pleuni Cornelisse	2 – 1
Men –73 kg	Jano Rübo	00 (yellow card) – 10 (yellow card)	Koen Heg	2 – 2
Women –70 kg	Miriam Butkereit	10 (yellow card) – 00 (yellow card)	Sanne van Dijke	3 – 2
Men –90 kg	Martin Matijass	10 (yellow card) – 00	Frank de Wit	4 – 2
Results

=== Bronze medal matches ===
==== France vs Netherlands ====
Weight Class	France	Result	Netherlands	Score
Men +90 kg	Emre Sanal	00 – 02 (yellow card)	Jelle Snippe	0 – 1
Women –57 kg	Sarah-Léonie Cysique	10 – 00	Pleuni Cornelisse	1 – 1
Men –73 kg	Orlando Cazorla	00 – 10 (yellow card)	Koen Heg	1 – 2
Women –70 kg	Margaux Pinot	00 – 10 (yellow card)	Sanne van Dijke	1 – 3
Men –90 kg	Maxime-Gaël Ngayap Hambou	01 (yellow card) – 02 (yellow card)	Jesper Smink	1 – 4
Women +70 kg	Sama Hawa Camara	—	Marit Kamps	—
Results

==== Portugal vs Italy ====
Weight Class	Portugal	Result	Italy	Score
Men +90 kg	Diogo Brites	00 – 10	Christian Parlati	0 – 1
Women –57 kg	Ana Agulhas	00 – 02	Odette Giuffrida	0 – 2
Men –73 kg	João Crisóstomo	00 – 01	Edoardo Mella	0 – 3
Women –70 kg	Taís Pina	00 – 10	Irene Pedrotti	0 – 4
Men –90 kg	Diogo Luís	—	Nicholas Mungai	—
Women +70 kg	Carolina Paiva	—	Asya Tavano	—
Results

=== Gold medal match ===
==== Georgia vs Germany ====
Weight Class	Georgia	Result	Germany	Score
Men +90 kg	Guram Tushishvili	10 – 00	Erik Abramov	1 – 0
Women –57 kg	Eteri Liparteliani	02 – 00	Seija Ballhaus	2 – 0
Men –73 kg	Lasha Shavdatuashvili	11 – 00	Jano Rübo	3 – 0
Women –70 kg	Eter Askilashvili	00 (yellow card) – 01 (yellow card)	Miriam Butkereit	3 – 1
Men –90 kg	Lasha Bekauri	01 – 00	Martin Matijass	4 – 1
Women +70 kg	Sophio Somkhishvili	—	Renée Lucht	—
Results
