= 2023 World Judo Championships – Mixed team =

Judo competition

Judo Mixed team at the 2023 World Judo Championships
- Venue: Ali Bin Hamad Al Attiya Arena
- Location: Doha, Qatar
- Date: 14 May 2023
- Competitors: 211 from 18 nations
- Total prize money: €200,000

Medalists
gold medal	Haruka Funakubo; Soichi Hashimoto; Kokoro Kageura; Hayato Koga; Moka Kuwagata; Sanshiro Murao; Saki Niizoe; Tatsuru Saito; Maya Segawa; Akira Sone; Goki Tajima; Momo Tamaoki	Japan
silver medal	Orlando Cazorla; Sarah-Léonie Cysique; Romane Dicko; Joan-Benjamin Gaba; Marie-Ève Gahié; Priscilla Gneto; Coralie Hayme; Alexis Mathieu; Amadou Meité; Maxime-Gaël Ngayap Hambou; Margaux Pinot; Joseph Terhec	France
bronze medal	Eter Askilashvili; Lasha Bekauri; Kote Kapanadze; Eteri Liparteliani; Luka Maisuradze; Lasha Shavdatuashvili; Sophio Somkhishvili; Guram Tushishvili; Gela Zaalishvili	Georgia
bronze medal	Julie Beurskens; Frank de Wit; Koen Heg; Michael Korrel; Roy Meyer; Kim Polling; Guusje Steenhuis; Karen Stevenson; Noël van 't End; Sanne van Dijke	Netherlands

Champions
- Mixed team: Japan (6th title)

Competition at external databases
- Links: IJF • JudoInside

The mixed team event at the 2023 World Judo Championships was held at the Ali Bin Hamad al-Attiyah Arena in Doha, Qatar on 14 May 2023.

== Results ==
=== Bracket ===
First round
Georgia	4
Mongolia	2
Morocco	4
Greece	0

Round of 16
Japan	4
South Korea	2
Georgia	4
Brazil	3
Netherlands	4
Cuba	3
Uzbekistan	4
IJF Refugee Team	0
France	4
Lithuania	1
Bulgaria	3
Romania	4
Germany	4
Kazakhstan	0
Morocco	4
Austria	3

Quarter-finals
Japan	4
Georgia	1
Netherlands	4
Uzbekistan	3
France	4
Romania	0
Germany	4
Morocco	0

Semi-finals
Japan	4
Netherlands	2
France	4
Germany	1

Final
Japan	4
France	3

=== Repechage ===
Repechage
Georgia	4
Uzbekistan	2
Romania	2
Morocco	4

Third place
Georgia	4
Germany	2
Morocco	0
Netherlands	3

== Matches ==
=== First round ===
==== Georgia vs Mongolia ====
Weight Class	Georgia	Result	Mongolia	Score
Men –90 kg	Lasha Bekauri	01 (yellow card) – 00	Gantulgyn Altanbagana	1 – 0
Women +70 kg	Sophio Somkhishvili	02 – 00	Amarsaikhany Adiyaasüren	2 – 0
Men +90 kg	Gela Zaalishvili	00 (yellow card) – 10	Batkhuyagiin Gonchigsüren	2 – 1
Women –57 kg	Eteri Liparteliani	02 – 01	Mönkhtsedeviin Ichinkhorloo	3 – 1
Men –73 kg	Lasha Shavdatuashvili	00 – 10	Batzayaagiin Erdenebayar	3 – 2
Women –70 kg	Eter Askilashvili	01 (yellow card) – 00	Batsuuriin Nyam-Erdene	4 – 2

==== Morocco vs Greece ====
Weight Class	Morocco	Result	Greece	Score
Men –90 kg	Achraf Moutii	10 – 00	Theodoros Demourtsidis	1 – 0
Women +70 kg	Hafsa Yatim	11 – 00 (yellow card)	Maria-Nicoleta Vulpasin	2 – 0
Men +90 kg	Mohammed Lahboub	10 – 00	Panagiotis Papanikolaou	3 – 0
Women –57 kg	Soumiya Iraoui	10 (yellow card) – 00	Christina Papadopoulou	4 – 0
Men –73 kg	Hassan Doukkali	—	Michail Tsoutlasvili	—
Women –70 kg	Assmaa Niang	—	Elisavet Teltsidou	—

=== Round of 16 ===
==== Japan vs Republic of Korea ====
Weight Class	Japan	Result	South Korea	Score
Women +70 kg	Maya Segawa	00 – 10	Kim Ha-yun	0 – 1
Men +90 kg	Kokoro Kageura	00 – 01	Kim Min-jong	0 – 2
Women –57 kg	Momo Tamaoki	10 – 00	Huh Mi-mi	1 – 2
Men –73 kg	Hayato Koga	10 – 00	Kang Heon-cheol	2 – 2
Women –70 kg	Moka Kuwagata	10 (yellow card) – 00	Kim Ji-jeong	3 – 2
Men –90 kg	Goki Tajima	11 (yellow card) – 00	Han Ju-yeop	4 – 2

==== Georgia vs Brazil ====
Weight Class	Georgia	Result	Brazil	Score
Women +70 kg	Sophio Somkhishvili	00 – 10	Beatriz Souza	0 – 1
Men +90 kg	Guram Tushishvili	10 – 00	Rafael Silva	1 – 1
Women –57 kg	Eteri Liparteliani	00 – 10	Rafaela Silva	1 – 2
Men –73 kg	Lasha Shavdatuashvili	01 – 00	Willian Lima	2 – 2
Women –70 kg	Eter Askilashvili	01 (yellow card) – 02 (yellow card)	Ketleyn Quadros	2 – 3
Men –90 kg	Luka Maisuradze	02 – 00	Rafael Macedo	3 – 3
Men –90 kg	Luka Maisuradze	01 (yellow card) – 00	Rafael Macedo	4 – 3

==== Netherlands vs Cuba ====
Weight Class	Netherlands	Result	Cuba	Score
Women +70 kg	Guusje Steenhuis	w/o –	-none Women +70 kg-	1 – 0
Men +90 kg	Michael Korrel	00 – 10	Andy Granda	1 – 1
Women –57 kg	Julie Beurskens	00 – 10 (yellow card)	Arnaes Odelín	1 – 2
Men –73 kg	Koen Heg	00 – 10	Magdiel Estrada	1 – 3
Women –70 kg	Sanne van Dijke	01 (yellow card) – 00 (yellow card)	Maylín del Toro Carvajal	2 – 3
Men –90 kg	Noël van 't End	11 (yellow card) – 00	Iván Felipe Silva Morales	3 – 3
Men –90 kg	Noël van 't End	10 (yellow card) – 00 (yellow card)	Iván Felipe Silva Morales	4 – 3

==== Uzbekistan vs International Judo Federation Refugee Team ====
Weight Class	Uzbekistan	Result	IJF	Score
Women +70 kg	Rinata Ilmatova	w/o –	-none Women +70 kg-	1 – 0
Men +90 kg	Shokhrukhkhon Bakhtiyorov	11 – 00	Adnan Khankan	2 – 0
Women –57 kg	Diyora Keldiyorova	10 (yellow card) – 00 (yellow card)	Muna Dahouk	3 – 0
Men –73 kg	Obidkhon Nomonov	11 – 00	Kavan Majidi	4 – 0
Women –70 kg	Shokhista Nazarova	—	Nigara Shaheen	—
Men –90 kg	Jakhongir Mamatrakhimov	—	Sibghatullah Arab	—

==== France vs Lithuania ====
Weight Class	France	Result	Lithuania	Score
Women +70 kg	Romane Dicko	10 – 00	Miglė Dudėnaitė	1 – 0
Men +90 kg	Joseph Terhec	02 (yellow card) – 00	Ignas Mečajus	2 – 0
Women –57 kg	Priscilla Gneto	02 – 00	Vaiga Čečytė	3 – 0
Men –73 kg	Orlando Cazorla	00 (yellow card) – 01	Kęstutis Vitkauskas	3 – 1
Women –70 kg	Margaux Pinot	11 – 00	Ugnė Pileckaitė	4 – 1
Men –90 kg	Maxime-Gaël Ngayap Hambou	—	Kostas Butkus	—

==== Bulgaria vs Romania ====
Weight Class	Bulgaria	Result	Romania	Score
Women +70 kg	Irina Zhelezarska	00 (yellow card) – 02 (yellow card)	Alexandra Mazilu	0 – 1
Men +90 kg	Boris Georgiev	10 (yellow card) – 00 (yellow card) H	Mircea Croitoru	1 – 1
Women –57 kg	Gabriela Dimitrova	01 – 00	Alexandra Pop	2 – 1
Men –73 kg	Mark Hristov	10 – 00	Adrian Şulcă	3 – 1
Women –70 kg	Lidia Brancheva	00 (yellow card) – 11	Serafima Moscalu	3 – 2
Men –90 kg	-none Men –90 kg-	– w/o	Alex Creţ	3 – 3
Women –57 kg	Gabriela Dimitrova	00 (yellow card) – 10	Alexandra Pop	3 – 4

==== Germany vs Kazakhstan ====
Weight Class	Germany	Result	Kazakhstan	Score
Women +70 kg	Samira Bouizgarne	10 (yellow card) – 00	Kamila Berlikash	1 – 0
Men +90 kg	Losseni Kone	10 – 00	Galymzhan Krikbay	2 – 0
Women –57 kg	Pauline Starke	10 – 00 (yellow card)	Bakyt Kussakbayeva	3 – 0
Men –73 kg	Alexander Gabler	11 – 01 (yellow card)	Zhansay Smagulov	4 – 0
Women –70 kg	Miriam Butkereit	—	Anastassiya Mayakova	—
Men –90 kg	Martin Matijass	—	Abylaikhan Zhubanazar	—

==== Morocco vs Austria ====
Weight Class	Morocco	Result	Austria	Score
Women +70 kg	Hafsa Yatim	00 – 10 (yellow card)	Maria Höllwart	0 – 1
Men +90 kg	Mohammed Lahboub	10 – 00	Aaron Fara	1 – 1
Women –57 kg	Soumiya Iraoui	10 – 00	Verena Hiden	2 – 1
Men –73 kg	Hassan Doukkali	11 (yellow card) – 00	Lukas Reiter	3 – 1
Women –70 kg	Assmaa Niang	00 – 10 (yellow card)	Magdalena Krssakova	3 – 2
Men –90 kg	Achraf Moutii	00 – 02	Bernd Fasching	3 – 3
Men +90 kg	Mohammed Lahboub	10 – 00	Aaron Fara	4 – 3

=== Quarter-finals ===
==== Japan vs Georgia ====
Weight Class	Japan	Result	Georgia	Score
Men +90 kg	Tatsuru Saito	00 – 10 (yellow card)	Guram Tushishvili	0 – 1
Women –57 kg	Momo Tamaoki	01 (yellow card) – 00	Eteri Liparteliani	1 – 1
Men –73 kg	Soichi Hashimoto	10 (yellow card) – 00 (yellow card)	Kote Kapanadze	2 – 1
Women –70 kg	Moka Kuwagata	01 – 00	Eter Askilashvili	3 – 1
Men –90 kg	Goki Tajima	01 (yellow card) – 00 (yellow card)	Luka Maisuradze	4 – 1
Women +70 kg	Maya Segawa	—	Sophio Somkhishvili	—

==== Netherlands vs Uzbekistan ====
Weight Class	Netherlands	Result	Uzbekistan	Score
Men +90 kg	Roy Meyer	00 (yellow card) – 10 (yellow card)	Alisher Yusupov	0 – 1
Women –57 kg	Julie Beurskens	00 – 10 (yellow card)	Shukurjon Aminova	0 – 2
Men –73 kg	Koen Heg	00 – 10	Murodjon Yuldoshev	0 – 3
Women –70 kg	Kim Polling	11 – 01 H	Gulnoza Matniyazova	1 – 3
Men –90 kg	Noël van 't End	02 – 00 (yellow card)	Jakhongir Mamatrakhimov	2 – 3
Women +70 kg	Karen Stevenson	10 – 00	Iriskhon Kurbanbaeva	3 – 3
Men –90 kg	Noël van 't End	10 – 00	Jakhongir Mamatrakhimov	4 – 3

==== France vs Romania ====
Weight Class	France	Result	Romania	Score
Men +90 kg	Joseph Terhec	10 (yellow card) – 00	Alex Creţ	1 – 0
Women –57 kg	Sarah-Léonie Cysique	02 – 00	Alexandra Pop	2 – 0
Men –73 kg	Joan-Benjamin Gaba	10 – 00	Alexandru Raicu	3 – 0
Women –70 kg	Marie-Ève Gahié	02 – 01	Serafima Moscalu	4 – 0
Men –90 kg	Alexis Mathieu	—	Adrian Şulcă	—
Women +70 kg	Romane Dicko	—	Alexandra Mazilu	—

==== Germany vs Morocco ====
Weight Class	Germany	Result	Morocco	Score
Men +90 kg	Losseni Kone	01 (yellow card) – 00	Mohammed Lahboub	1 – 0
Women –57 kg	Seija Ballhaus	10 – 00	Soumiya Iraoui	2 – 0
Men –73 kg	Alexander Gabler	10 (yellow card) – 00	Hassan Doukkali	3 – 0
Women –70 kg	Miriam Butkereit	10 (yellow card) – 00 (yellow card)	Assmaa Niang	4 – 0
Men –90 kg	Martin Matijass	—	Achraf Moutii	—
Women +70 kg	Anna Monta Olek	—	Hafsa Yatim	—

=== Semi-finals ===
==== Japan vs Netherlands ====
Weight Class	Japan	Result	Netherlands	Score
Women –57 kg	Haruka Funakubo	10 – 00	Julie Beurskens	1 – 0
Men –73 kg	Soichi Hashimoto	02 – 00 (yellow card)	Koen Heg	2 – 0
Women –70 kg	Moka Kuwagata	00 – 10	Sanne van Dijke	2 – 1
Men –90 kg	Goki Tajima	10 – 00	Frank de Wit	3 – 1
Women +70 kg	Maya Segawa	00 – 10	Karen Stevenson	3 – 2
Men +90 kg	Tatsuru Saito	02 (yellow card) – 00	Roy Meyer	4 – 2

==== France vs Germany ====
Weight Class	France	Result	Germany	Score
Women –57 kg	Sarah-Léonie Cysique	10 – 00	Seija Ballhaus	1 – 0
Men –73 kg	Joan-Benjamin Gaba	02 – 00 (yellow card)	Alexander Gabler	2 – 0
Women –70 kg	Marie-Ève Gahié	01 (yellow card) – 00	Giovanna Scoccimarro	3 – 0
Men –90 kg	Maxime-Gaël Ngayap Hambou	00 – 10	Martin Matijass	3 – 1
Women +70 kg	Romane Dicko	02 – 00	Anna Monta Olek	4 – 1
Men +90 kg	Joseph Terhec	—	Jonas Schreiber	—

=== Repechage ===
==== Georgia vs Uzbekistan ====
Weight Class	Georgia	Result	Uzbekistan	Score
Women –57 kg	Eteri Liparteliani	02 – 00	Shukurjon Aminova	1 – 0
Men –73 kg	Lasha Shavdatuashvili	00 – 10	Obidkhon Nomonov	1 – 1
Women –70 kg	Eter Askilashvili	00 – 01	Gulnoza Matniyazova	1 – 2
Men –90 kg	Luka Maisuradze	11 – 00 (yellow card)	Muso Sobirov	2 – 2
Women +70 kg	Sophio Somkhishvili	01 (yellow card) – 00 (yellow card)	Rinata Ilmatova	3 – 2
Men +90 kg	Guram Tushishvili	10 (yellow card) – 00	Alisher Yusupov	4 – 2

==== Romania vs Morocco ====
Weight Class	Romania	Result	Morocco	Score
Women –57 kg	Alexandra Pop	00 – 01 (yellow card)	Soumiya Iraoui	0 – 1
Men –73 kg	Adrian Şulcă	00 R – 10	Hassan Doukkali	0 – 2
Women –70 kg	Serafima Moscalu	11 – 01	Assmaa Niang	1 – 2
Men –90 kg	Alex Creţ	10 (yellow card) – 00	Achraf Moutii	2 – 2
Women +70 kg	Alexandra Mazilu	00 – 01 (yellow card)	Hafsa Yatim	2 – 3
Men +90 kg	-none Men +90 kg-	– w/o	Mohammed Lahboub	2 – 4

=== Third place ===
==== Georgia vs Germany ====
Weight Class	Georgia	Result	Germany	Score
Men –73 kg	Lasha Shavdatuashvili	01 (yellow card) – 00 (yellow card)	Alexander Gabler	1 – 0
Women –70 kg	Eter Askilashvili	00 – 10	Giovanna Scoccimarro	1 – 1
Men –90 kg	Lasha Bekauri	02 – 00	Martin Matijass	2 – 1
Women +70 kg	Sophio Somkhishvili	00 – 10	Anna Monta Olek	2 – 2
Men +90 kg	Guram Tushishvili	10 – 00	Losseni Kone	3 – 2
Women –57 kg	Eteri Liparteliani	01 – 00 (yellow card)	Seija Ballhaus	4 – 2

==== Morocco vs Netherlands ====
Weight Class	Morocco	Result	Netherlands	Score
Men –73 kg	Hassan Doukkali	00 H – 10 (yellow card)	Koen Heg	0 – 1
Women –70 kg	Assmaa Niang	00 – 02	Kim Polling	0 – 2
Men –90 kg	Achraf Moutii	10 – 10	Noël van 't End	0 – 2
Women +70 kg	Hafsa Yatim	00 – 02	Guusje Steenhuis	0 – 3
Men +90 kg	Mohammed Lahboub	—	Michael Korrel	—
Women –57 kg	Soumiya Iraoui	—	Julie Beurskens	—

=== Final - Japan vs France ===
Weight Class	Japan	Result	France	Score
Men –73 kg	Soichi Hashimoto	00 – 10	Joan-Benjamin Gaba	0 – 1
Women –70 kg	Saki Niizoe	00 (yellow card) – 01 (yellow card)	Margaux Pinot	0 – 2
Men –90 kg	Goki Tajima	01 – 00	Maxime-Gaël Ngayap Hambou	1 – 2
Women +70 kg	Maya Segawa	00 – 10 (yellow card)	Coralie Hayme	1 – 3
Men +90 kg	Tatsuru Saito	10 – 00	Joseph Terhec	2 – 3
Women –57 kg	Haruka Funakubo	10 – 01	Sarah-Léonie Cysique	3 – 3
Women –70 kg	Saki Niizoe	10 – 00	Margaux Pinot	4 – 3

== Prize money ==
The sums listed bring the total prizes awarded to €200,000 for the event.

Medal	Total	Judoka	Coach
Gold	€90,000	€72,000	€18,000
Silver	€60,000	€48,000	€12,000
Bronze	€25,000	€20,000	€5,000
