= 2021 European Mixed Team Judo Championships =

Judo 2021 European Mixed Team Judo Championships
- Venue: Rima Batalova Center of Sport
- Location: Ufa, Bashkortostan, Russia
- Date: 27 November 2021
- Competitors: 123 from 16 nations

Medalists
gold medal	Phridon Gigani; Nino Gulbani; Beka Gviniashvili; Saba Inaneishvili; Eteri Liparteliani; Luka Maisuradse; Aleko Mamiashvili; Sophio Somkhishvili; Mariam Tchanturia; Gela Zaalishvili	Georgia
silver medal	Pleuni Cornelisse; Koen Heg; Hilde Jager; Marit Kamps; Tigo Renes; Jur Spijkers; Karen Stevenson; Matthijs van Harten	Netherlands
bronze medal	Tamerlan Bashaev; Dina Gizatulina; Anna Gushchina; Denis Iartsev; Khasan Khalmurzaev; Anastasia Konkina; Daria Kurbonmamadova; Makhmadbek Makhmadbekov; David Oganisian; Alena Prokopenko; Inal Tasoev; Daria Vladimirova	Russia
bronze medal	Minel Akdeniz; Vedat Albayrak; Hasret Bozkurt; Bilal Çiloğlu; Kübranur Esir; Bayram Kandemir; Mikail Özerler; Şeyma Özerler; Kayra Sayit; Mert Şişmanlar; Özlem Yıldız	Turkey

Champions
- Mixed team: Georgia (1st title)

Competition at external databases
- Links: IJF • JudoInside

The 2021 European Mixed Team Judo Championships were held in Ufa, Bashkortostan, Russia on 27 November 2021. The competition was the 3rd edition of the European Mixed Team Judo Championships, following the Yekaterinburg 2018 and Minsk 2019 editions.

== Event videos ==
The event aired freely on the EJU YouTube channel.

Preliminaries			Final Block
Commentated: English, Russian			Commentated: English, Russian
Tatami 1	Tatami 2	Tatami 3	Commentated: English, Russian

== Results ==
=== Main draw ===
Round of 16
France	4
Bulgaria	3
Austria	0
Georgia	4
Russia	3
Turkey	4
Greece	4
Czech Republic	3
Germany	4
Slovenia	1
Netherlands	4
Romania	0
Israel	1
Belarus	4
Serbia	2
Spain	4

Quarter-finals
France	2
Georgia	4
Turkey	4
Greece	0
Germany	3
Netherlands	4
Belarus	4
Spain	0

Semi-finals
Georgia	4
Turkey	2
Netherlands	4
Belarus	2

Final
Georgia	4
Netherlands	3

=== Repechage ===
Repechage 1
Austria	4
France	2
Russia	4
Greece	0

Repechage 2
Austria	0
Russia	4

Bronze medal
Russia	4
Belarus	0

Repechage 1
Romania	2
Germany	4
Israel	4
Spain	1

Repechage 2
Germany	4
Israel	1

Bronze medal
Germany	1
Turkey	4
