= 2022 European Mixed Team Judo Championships =

Judo 2022 European Mixed Team Judo Championships
- Venue: Gilbert Buttazzoni Sports Palace
- Location: Mulhouse, France
- Date: 12 November 2022
- Nations: 14
- Website: Official website (in French)

Medalists
gold medal	Benjamin Axus; Guillaume Chaine; Léa Fontaine; Marie-Ève Gahié; Priscilla Gneto; Faïza Mokdar; Alexis Mathieu; Margaux Pinot; Emre Sanal; Loris Tassier; Joseph Terhec; Julia Tolofua	France
silver medal	Pleuni Cornelisse; Frank de Wit; Marit Kamps; Jesper Smink; Jelle Snippe; Jur Spijkers; Karen Stevenson; Shannon van de Meeberg; Sanne van Dijke; Matthijs van Harten	Netherlands
bronze medal	Seija Ballhaus; Alexander Gabler; Marlene Galandi; Laila Göbel; Raffaele Igl; Dario Kurbjeweit Garcia; Johann Lenz; Sarah Mehlau; Lea Schmid; Jonas Schreiber; Peter Thomas; Alexander Wieczerzak	Germany
bronze medal	Sebile Akbulut; Minel Akdeniz; Ömer Aydın; Hasret Bozkurt; Münir Ertuğ; Bayram Kandemir	Turkey

Champions
- Mixed team: France (1st title)

Competition at external databases
- Links: IJF • JudoInside

The 2022 European Mixed Team Judo Championships was held at the Gilbert Buttazzoni Sports Palace in Mulhouse, France, on 12 November 2022.

== Schedule & event videos ==
The event aired on the EJU YouTube channel. The draw was held on 11 November at 16:00. All times are local (UTC+1).

	Start time	Videos	
Preliminaries	10:00	Commentated	
Preliminaries	10:00	Tatami 1	Tatami 2
Final Block	16:00	Commentated	

== Results ==
=== Main draw ===
Round of 16
Ukraine	4
Poland	1
Italy	4
Austria	1
Bulgaria	2
Turkey	4
Czech Republic	4
Great Britain	0
Netherlands	4
Georgia	1
Slovenia	0
Hungary	4

Quarter-finals
France	4
Ukraine	0
Italy	2
Turkey	4
Germany	4
Czech Republic	0
Netherlands	4
Hungary	0

Semi-finals
France	4
Turkey	1
Germany	2
Netherlands	4

Final
France	4
Netherlands	1

=== Repechage ===
Repechage
Ukraine	0
Italy	4
Czech Republic	2
Hungary	4

Bronze medal
Italy	0
Germany	4
Hungary	2
Turkey	4
