= Moka Kuwagata =

Japanese judoka (born 2002)

Personal information
- Born: 10 October 2002 (age 23) Hyōgo Prefecture
- Occupation: Judoka

Sport
- Country: Japan
- Sport: Judo
- Weight class: ‍–‍70 kg
Medal record
Women's judo
Representing Japan
World Championships
Gold medal – first place	2023 Doha	Mixed team
Asian Games
Gold medal – first place	2022 Hangzhou	Mixed team
World Cadets Championships
Silver medal – second place	2019 Almaty	‍–‍70 kg

Profile at external databases
- IJF: 46615
- JudoInside.com: 123233
- Updated on 25 May 2024

Moka Kuwagata (桑形 萌花, Kuwagata Moka; born 10 October 2002) is a Japanese judoka who competes in the women's 70 kg division. Her specialty is uchimata.

== Career ==
=== Early career ===
Kuwagata started judo at the age of 7 at the Hyogo Shonen Kodama-kai. Her senior at the dojo was Uta Abe. In her fifth year of elementary school, she participated in the 40 kg+ class at the National Elementary School Judo Championships but lost in the third round. In her sixth year, she lost in the second round of the 45 kg+ class. In her second year at Shukugawa Gakuin Junior High School, she placed third in the 70 kg class at the National Junior High School Judo Championships, and second in her third year.

Kuwagata went on to Shukugawa High School and placed second in the All Japan Cadet Championships in her first year. In the Kinshuki Cup, she appeared as the vanguard in the semi-finals against Minamichikushi High School, where she won three consecutive matches by ippon, including a win against Koga Wakana with a o-koshi throw, but lost to the opposing vice captain, Sone Teru, with an uchi-mata throw. The entire team then lost to Sone, and they finished third. In the Inter-High School Championships, she won the 70 kg individual competition as a freshman, and although she did not participate in the team competition, she won thanks to the efforts of Abe Uta and others. In the National High School Championships, she came in second in the individual open-weight final, losing by waza-ari to Asobi Mami, a second-year student at Toin Gakuen High School. In her second year, Kuwagata won the All-Japan Cadet Championship. In the Inter-High School Championships, she came in third in the semi-finals, losing to Asobi, and in the team competition, she drew with the opposing ace Kuroda Aki in the final against Fuji Gakuen High School, but the team lost and came in second. In the All-Japan Junior Championships, she also came in third in the semi-finals, losing to Asobi. At the World Cadet Championships, she won all matches by ippon up until the semifinals, but lost to Ai Tsunoda of Spain by o-koshi in the finals and placed second. As a third-year student, she lost to Terada Utana, a fourth-year student at Toin University of Yokohama, in the semifinals of the Kodokan Cup, but still placed third. At the All Japan Championships, she won by disqualification against Asahina Sara of Big Tree, a former world champion in the over 78 kg class, in the second round, but lost to Hashimoto Akemi of Komatsu by uchi-mata and placed third. At this time, she said, "My goal is to win the gold medal at the (2024) Paris Olympics."

=== 2021-present ===
In April 2021, Kuwagata joined Mitsui Sumitomo Insurance. In her first weight class match, she lost to Terada Utana of JR East by sumi-otoshi. In December, she won the All Japan Junior Championships. In the following All Japan Championships, she lost by disqualification to Shiho Tanaka of JR East Japan in the quarterfinals, finishing in fifth place.

In February 2022, Kuwagata won her first senior international tournament at the European Open in Warsaw. She won the corporate team tournament in May. At the World Junior Championships in August, she lost by disqualification to Brenda Olaya of Colombia in the third round. In the team tournament, she won all of her matches by ippon, including the final against Turkey, contributing to her team's victory. At the All Japan Junior Championships in September, she lost by disqualification to Honda Mayu, a third-year student at Hieizan High School, in the final, failing to win her second consecutive title. At the Kodokan Cup in October, she won by disqualification against Yukiko Uno of JR East Japan in the final.

In February 2023, Kuwagata lost her first match to Tsunoda at the Grand Slam Paris. She was also selected as a member of the World Team Championships. In April, she won the weight class final by defeating Erina Ike of Kokushikan University Judo Club by disqualification. In May, Kuwagata won her first two matches at the World Team Championships, but lost in the semi-finals to the Netherlands and did not participate in the finals, but her team won the championship. In the following May, she lost in the third round at the Grand Prix Linz. She placed second in the corporate team competition in June. She only participated in the first match against Nepal in the team competition, but her team won before her turn, and the team went on to win the championship.

At the Grand Prix Linz in March 2024, Kuwagata lost by disqualification to Irene Pedrotti of Italy in the quarterfinals and to Michaela Porreles of Austria in the third-place deciding match, finishing in fifth place. In April, she lost her first match in her weight class.
