= 2023 World Judo Championships =

Judo competition

2023 Judo World Judo Championships
- Venue: Ali Bin Hamad Al Attiya Arena
- Location: Doha, Qatar
- Dates: 7–14 May 2023
- Competitors: 657 from 99 nations
- Total prize money: €998,000
- Website: Official website

Competition at external databases
- Links: IJF • EJU • JudoInside

The 2023 World Judo Championships were held at the Ali Bin Hamad al-Attiyah Arena in Doha, Qatar, from 7 to 14 May 2023 as part of the IJF World Tour and during the 2024 Summer Olympics qualification period, concluding with a mixed team event on the final day.

== Schedule ==
All times are local (UTC+3).

Day	Date	Weight classes		Preliminaries	Final Block
Day	Date	Men	Women	Preliminaries	Final Block
1	7 May	60 kg	48 kg	11:00	18:00
2	8 May	66 kg	52 kg	10:30	18:00
3	9 May	73 kg	57 kg	10:30	18:00
4	10 May	81 kg	63 kg	10:30	18:00
5	11 May	90 kg	70 kg	10:30	18:00
6	12 May	100 kg	78 kg	11:30	18:00
7	13 May	+100 kg	+78 kg	11:30	18:00
8	14 May	Mixed team		10:30	18:00

== Medal summary ==
=== Medal table ===
* Host nation (Qatar)

Rank	Nation	Gold	Silver	Bronze	Total
1	Japan	6	2	4	12
2	France	2	4	2	8
3	Georgia	2	1	2	5
–	Individual Neutral Athletes (Note: Russian and Belarusian judokas participated as Individual Neutral Athletes as a result of sanctions imposed following the 2022 invasion of Ukraine. The IJF does not include the medals won by these judokas in the official medal table.)	2	0	0	2
4	Israel	1	0	2	3
5	Canada	1	0	1	2
6	Spain	1	0	0	1
6	Switzerland	1	0	0	1
8	Uzbekistan	0	2	2	4
9	Italy	0	1	3	4
10	Belgium	0	1	0	1
10	Czech Republic	0	1	0	1
10	Germany	0	1	0	1
10	Slovenia	0	1	0	1
14	Netherlands	0	0	3	3
15	Brazil	0	0	2	2
15	Mongolia	0	0	2	2
15	South Korea	0	0	2	2
18	Austria	0	0	1	1
18	Azerbaijan	0	0	1	1
18	Croatia	0	0	1	1
18	Hungary	0	0	1	1
18	Sweden	0	0	1	1
Totals (22 entries)		16	14	30	60

=== Men's events ===
Event	Gold	Silver	Bronze
Extra-lightweight (60 kg)	Francisco Garrigós; Spain	Dilshodbek Baratov; Uzbekistan	Giorgi Sardalashvili; Georgia
Extra-lightweight (60 kg)	Francisco Garrigós; Spain	Dilshodbek Baratov; Uzbekistan	Lee Ha-rim; South Korea
Half-lightweight (66 kg)	Hifumi Abe; Japan	Joshiro Maruyama; Japan	Yondonperenlein Baskhüü; Mongolia
Half-lightweight (66 kg)	Hifumi Abe; Japan	Joshiro Maruyama; Japan	Walide Khyar; France
Lightweight (73 kg)	Nils Stump; Switzerland	Manuel Lombardo; Italy	Soichi Hashimoto; Japan
Lightweight (73 kg)	Nils Stump; Switzerland	Manuel Lombardo; Italy	Murodjon Yuldoshev; Uzbekistan
Half-middleweight (81 kg)	Tato Grigalashvili; Georgia	Matthias Casse; Belgium	Takanori Nagase; Japan
Half-middleweight (81 kg)	Tato Grigalashvili; Georgia	Matthias Casse; Belgium	Lee Joon-hwan; South Korea
Middleweight (90 kg)	Luka Maisuradze; Georgia	Lasha Bekauri; Georgia	Marcus Nyman; Sweden
Middleweight (90 kg)	Luka Maisuradze; Georgia	Lasha Bekauri; Georgia	Sanshiro Murao; Japan
Half-heavyweight (100 kg)	Arman Adamian; Individual Neutral Athletes	Lukáš Krpálek; Czech Republic	Zelym Kotsoiev; Azerbaijan
Half-heavyweight (100 kg)	Arman Adamian; Individual Neutral Athletes	Lukáš Krpálek; Czech Republic	Peter Paltchik; Israel
Heavyweight (+100 kg)	Teddy Riner; France	Not awarded	Alisher Yusupov; Uzbekistan
Heavyweight (+100 kg)	Inal Tasoev (Note: During the final between Teddy Riner and Inal Tasoev, there was one situation where neither the referee on the mat nor the IJF Refereeing Commission gave any score. Following a thorough expert analysis, according to the current refereeing rules, a score could have been awarded for Inal Tasoev's counterattack. Therefore, the IJF declares both athletes as the winners of the contest and award a gold medal and the corresponding ranking points to Inal Tasoev.); Individual Neutral Athletes	Not awarded	Rafael Silva; Brazil

=== Women's events ===
Event	Gold	Silver	Bronze
Extra-lightweight (48 kg)	Natsumi Tsunoda; Japan	Shirine Boukli; France	Wakana Koga; Japan
Extra-lightweight (48 kg)	Natsumi Tsunoda; Japan	Shirine Boukli; France	Assunta Scutto; Italy
Half-lightweight (52 kg)	Uta Abe; Japan	Diyora Keldiyorova; Uzbekistan	Amandine Buchard; France
Half-lightweight (52 kg)	Uta Abe; Japan	Diyora Keldiyorova; Uzbekistan	Odette Giuffrida; Italy
Lightweight (57 kg)	Christa Deguchi; Canada	Haruka Funakubo; Japan	Lkhagvatogoogiin Enkhriilen; Mongolia
Lightweight (57 kg)	Christa Deguchi; Canada	Haruka Funakubo; Japan	Jessica Klimkait; Canada
Half-middleweight (63 kg)	Clarisse Agbegnenou; France	Andreja Leški; Slovenia	Szofi Özbas; Hungary
Half-middleweight (63 kg)	Clarisse Agbegnenou; France	Andreja Leški; Slovenia	Joanne van Lieshout; Netherlands
Middleweight (70 kg)	Saki Niizoe; Japan	Giovanna Scoccimarro; Germany	Michaela Polleres; Austria
Middleweight (70 kg)	Saki Niizoe; Japan	Giovanna Scoccimarro; Germany	Barbara Matić; Croatia
Half-heavyweight (78 kg)	Inbar Lanir; Israel	Audrey Tcheuméo; France	Guusje Steenhuis; Netherlands
Half-heavyweight (78 kg)	Inbar Lanir; Israel	Audrey Tcheuméo; France	Alice Bellandi; Italy
Heavyweight (+78 kg)	Akira Sone; Japan	Julia Tolofua; France	Beatriz Souza; Brazil
Heavyweight (+78 kg)	Akira Sone; Japan	Julia Tolofua; France	Raz Hershko; Israel

=== Mixed events ===
Event	Gold	Silver	Bronze
Mixed team	Japan; Haruka Funakubo; Soichi Hashimoto; Kokoro Kageura; Hayato Koga; Moka Kuwagata; Sanshiro Murao; Saki Niizoe; Tatsuru Saito; Maya Segawa; Akira Sone; Goki Tajima; Momo Tamaoki	France; Orlando Cazorla; Sarah-Léonie Cysique; Romane Dicko; Joan-Benjamin Gaba; Marie-Ève Gahié; Priscilla Gneto; Coralie Hayme; Alexis Mathieu; Amadou Meité; Maxime-Gaël Ngayap Hambou; Margaux Pinot; Joseph Terhec	Georgia; Eter Askilashvili; Lasha Bekauri; Kote Kapanadze; Eteri Liparteliani; Luka Maisuradze; Lasha Shavdatuashvili; Sophio Somkhishvili; Guram Tushishvili; Gela Zaalishvili
Mixed team	Japan; Haruka Funakubo; Soichi Hashimoto; Kokoro Kageura; Hayato Koga; Moka Kuwagata; Sanshiro Murao; Saki Niizoe; Tatsuru Saito; Maya Segawa; Akira Sone; Goki Tajima; Momo Tamaoki	France; Orlando Cazorla; Sarah-Léonie Cysique; Romane Dicko; Joan-Benjamin Gaba; Marie-Ève Gahié; Priscilla Gneto; Coralie Hayme; Alexis Mathieu; Amadou Meité; Maxime-Gaël Ngayap Hambou; Margaux Pinot; Joseph Terhec	Netherlands; Julie Beurskens; Frank de Wit; Koen Heg; Michael Korrel; Roy Meyer; Kim Polling; Guusje Steenhuis; Karen Stevenson; Noël van 't End; Sanne van Dijke

== Prize money ==
The sums written are per medalist, bringing the total prizes awarded to €798,000 for the individual events and €200,000 for the team event. (retrieved from:)

Medal	Individual			Mixed team		
Medal	Total	Judoka	Coach	Total	Judoka	Coach
Gold	€26,000	€20,800	€5,200	€90,000	€72,000	€18,000
Silver	€15,000	€12,000	€3,000	€60,000	€48,000	€12,000
Bronze	€8,000	€6,400	€1,600	€25,000	€20,000	€5,000

== Russian and Belarusian participation controversy ==
The International Judo Federation (IJF) announced on 29 April 2023, the last day of event registration, that Russian and Belarusian athletes would be allowed to participate as individual neutral athletes following background checks. Following the announcement, twenty Russian and Belarusian athletes were registered were entered into the championships. Of the twenty, at least five were reported to have ties to the Russian Armed Forces, despite the International Olympic Committee's (IOC) suggestion to deny participation of athletes who are contracted to the Russian or Belarusian military or national security agencies. In protest, the Ukrainian team withdrew from the championships.
