= Victor Sterpu =

Moldovan judoka (born 1999)

Personal information
- Born: 14 June 1999 (age 27)
- Occupation: Judoka
- Height: 176 cm (5 ft 9 in)

Sport
- Country: Moldova
- Sport: Judo
- Weight class: ‍–‍73 kg, ‍–‍81 kg

Achievements and titles
- Olympic Games: R16 (2020)
- World Champ.: R16 (2022)
- European Champ.: (gold) (2020)
Medal record
Men's judo
Representing Moldova
European Championships
Gold medal – first place	2020 Prague	‍–‍73 kg
IJF Grand Slam
Bronze medal – third place	2021 Antalya	‍–‍73 kg
Bronze medal – third place	2023 Tbilisi	‍–‍81 kg
Bronze medal – third place	2025 Abu Dhabi	‍–‍81 kg
Bronze medal – third place	2026 Dushanbe	‍–‍81 kg
IJF Grand Prix
Gold medal – first place	2024 Zagreb	‍–‍81 kg
Silver medal – second place	2021 Zagreb	‍–‍73 kg
Bronze medal – third place	2018 The Hague	‍–‍73 kg
European U23 Championships
Gold medal – first place	2020 Poreč	‍–‍73 kg
World Juniors Championships
Bronze medal – third place	2019 Marrakesh	‍–‍73 kg
European Junior Championships
Gold medal – first place	2019 Vantaa	‍–‍73 kg

Profile at external databases
- IJF: 24187
- JudoInside.com: 106096
- Updated on 2 May 2026

Victor Sterpu (born 14 June 1999) is a Moldovan judoka. He won the gold medal in the men's 73 kg event at the 2020 European Judo Championships held in Prague, Czech Republic. In July 2021, he competed in the men's 73 kg event at the 2020 Summer Olympics in Tokyo, Japan.

== Career ==
He competed in the men's 73 kg event at the 2018 World Judo Championships held in Baku, Azerbaijan. In that same year, he won one of the bronze medals in the men's 73 kg event at the 2018 Judo Grand Prix The Hague held in The Hague, Netherlands. The following year, he competed in the men's 73 kg event at the 2019 World Judo Championships held in Tokyo, Japan.

In 2019, he represented Moldova at the European Games held in Minsk, Belarus. He competed in the men's 73 kg event and he was eliminated in his first match.

In 2021, he competed in the men's 73 kg event at the Judo World Masters held in Doha, Qatar. He also competed in the men's 73 kg event at the 2021 World Judo Championships held in Budapest, Hungary where he was eliminated in his second match by Sulaiman Hamad of Saudi Arabia.

== Achievements ==
Year	Tournament	Place	Weight class
2020	European Championships	1st	−73 kg
