= 2023 Judo Grand Slam Tbilisi =

Judo competition

Judo 2023 Judo Grand Slam Tbilisi
- Venue: Olympic Palace
- Location: Tbilisi, Georgia
- Dates: 24–26 March 2023
- Competitors: 419 from 61 nations
- Total prize money: €154,000

Competition at external databases
- Links: IJF • EJU • JudoInside

The 2023 Judo Grand Slam Tbilisi was held at the Olympic Palace in Tbilisi, Georgia from 24 to 26 March 2023 as part of the IJF World Tour and during the 2024 Summer Olympics qualification period.

== Medal summary ==
=== Men's events ===
| Event | Gold | Silver | Bronze |
|---|---|---|---|
| Extra-lightweight (−60 kg) | Turan Bayramov (AZE) | Giorgi Sardalashvili (GEO) | Magzhan Shamshadin (KAZ) |
| Extra-lightweight (−60 kg) | Turan Bayramov (AZE) | Giorgi Sardalashvili (GEO) | Artem Lesiuk (UKR) |
| Half-lightweight (−66 kg) | Kubanychbek Aibek Uulu (KGZ) | Yondonperenlein Baskhüü (MGL) | Bogdan Iadov (UKR) |
| Half-lightweight (−66 kg) | Kubanychbek Aibek Uulu (KGZ) | Yondonperenlein Baskhüü (MGL) | Matteo Piras (ITA) |
| Lightweight (−73 kg) | Batzayaagiin Erdenebayar (MGL) | Obidkhon Nomonov (UZB) | Lasha Shavdatuashvili (GEO) |
| Lightweight (−73 kg) | Batzayaagiin Erdenebayar (MGL) | Obidkhon Nomonov (UZB) | Salvador Cases (ESP) |
| Half-middleweight (−81 kg) | Wachid Borchashvili (AUT) | Abylaikhan Zhubanazar (KAZ) | Timo Cavelius (GER) |
| Half-middleweight (−81 kg) | Wachid Borchashvili (AUT) | Abylaikhan Zhubanazar (KAZ) | Victor Sterpu (MDA) |
| Middleweight (−90 kg) | Lasha Bekauri (GEO) | Luka Maisuradze (GEO) | Goki Tajima (JPN) |
| Middleweight (−90 kg) | Lasha Bekauri (GEO) | Luka Maisuradze (GEO) | Iván Felipe Silva Morales (CUB) |
| Half-heavyweight (−100 kg) | Ilia Sulamanidze (GEO) | Batkhuyagiin Gonchigsüren (MGL) | Shady El Nahas (CAN) |
| Half-heavyweight (−100 kg) | Ilia Sulamanidze (GEO) | Batkhuyagiin Gonchigsüren (MGL) | Rafael Buzacarini (BRA) |
| Heavyweight (+100 kg) | Gela Zaalishvili (GEO) | Münir Ertuğ (TUR) | Andy Granda (CUB) |
| Heavyweight (+100 kg) | Gela Zaalishvili (GEO) | Münir Ertuğ (TUR) | Shokhrukhkhon Bakhtiyorov (UZB) |

=== Women's events ===
| Event | Gold | Silver | Bronze |
|---|---|---|---|
| Extra-lightweight (−48 kg) | Milica Nikolić (SRB) | Andrea Stojadinov (SRB) | Ganbaataryn Narantsetseg (MGL) |
| Extra-lightweight (−48 kg) | Milica Nikolić (SRB) | Andrea Stojadinov (SRB) | Abiba Abuzhakynova (KAZ) |
| Half-lightweight (−52 kg) | Diyora Keldiyorova (UZB) | Distria Krasniqi (KOS) | Gultaj Mammadaliyeva (AZE) |
| Half-lightweight (−52 kg) | Diyora Keldiyorova (UZB) | Distria Krasniqi (KOS) | Mascha Ballhaus (GER) |
| Lightweight (−57 kg) | Marica Perišić (SRB) | Nora Gjakova (KOS) | Veronica Toniolo (ITA) |
| Lightweight (−57 kg) | Marica Perišić (SRB) | Nora Gjakova (KOS) | Jessica Klimkait (CAN) |
| Half-middleweight (−63 kg) | Lucy Renshall (GBR) | Laura Fazliu (KOS) | Katharina Haecker (AUS) |
| Half-middleweight (−63 kg) | Lucy Renshall (GBR) | Laura Fazliu (KOS) | Angelika Szymańska (POL) |
| Middleweight (−70 kg) | Elisavet Teltsidou (GRE) | Sanne van Dijke (NED) | Giovanna Scoccimarro (GER) |
| Middleweight (−70 kg) | Elisavet Teltsidou (GRE) | Sanne van Dijke (NED) | Martina Esposito (ITA) |
| Half-heavyweight (−78 kg) | Anna-Maria Wagner (GER) | Alice Bellandi (ITA) | Inbar Lanir (ISR) |
| Half-heavyweight (−78 kg) | Anna-Maria Wagner (GER) | Alice Bellandi (ITA) | Yuliia Kurchenko (UKR) |
| Heavyweight (+78 kg) | Raz Hershko (ISR) | Su Xin (CHN) | Xu Shiyan (CHN) |
| Heavyweight (+78 kg) | Raz Hershko (ISR) | Su Xin (CHN) | Karen Stevenson (NED) |

Source results:

=== Medal table ===
* Host nation (Georgia)

| Rank | Nation | Gold | Silver | Bronze | Total |
|---|---|---|---|---|---|
| 1 | Georgia (GEO)* | 3 | 2 | 1 | 6 |
| 2 | Serbia (SRB) | 2 | 1 | 0 | 3 |
| 3 | Mongolia (MGL) | 1 | 2 | 1 | 4 |
| 4 | Uzbekistan (UZB) | 1 | 1 | 1 | 3 |
| 5 | Germany (GER) | 1 | 0 | 3 | 4 |
| 6 | Azerbaijan (AZE) | 1 | 0 | 1 | 2 |
| 6 | Israel (ISR) | 1 | 0 | 1 | 2 |
| 8 | Austria (AUT) | 1 | 0 | 0 | 1 |
| 8 | Great Britain (GBR) | 1 | 0 | 0 | 1 |
| 8 | Greece (GRE) | 1 | 0 | 0 | 1 |
| 8 | Kyrgyzstan (KGZ) | 1 | 0 | 0 | 1 |
| 12 | Kosovo (KOS) | 0 | 3 | 0 | 3 |
| 13 | Italy (ITA) | 0 | 1 | 3 | 4 |
| 14 | Kazakhstan (KAZ) | 0 | 1 | 2 | 3 |
| 15 | China (CHN) | 0 | 1 | 1 | 2 |
| 15 | Netherlands (NED) | 0 | 1 | 1 | 2 |
| 17 | Turkey (TUR) | 0 | 1 | 0 | 1 |
| 18 | Ukraine (UKR) | 0 | 0 | 3 | 3 |
| 19 | Canada (CAN) | 0 | 0 | 2 | 2 |
| 19 | Cuba (CUB) | 0 | 0 | 2 | 2 |
| 21 | Australia (AUS) | 0 | 0 | 1 | 1 |
| 21 | Brazil (BRA) | 0 | 0 | 1 | 1 |
| 21 | Japan (JPN) | 0 | 0 | 1 | 1 |
| 21 | Moldova (MDA) | 0 | 0 | 1 | 1 |
| 21 | Poland (POL) | 0 | 0 | 1 | 1 |
| 21 | Spain (ESP) | 0 | 0 | 1 | 1 |
| Totals (26 entries) | | 14 | 14 | 28 | 56 |

== Prize money ==
The sums written are per medalist, bringing the total prizes awarded to €154,000. (retrieved from:)

| Medal | Total | Judoka | Coach |
|---|---|---|---|
| Gold | €5,000 | €4,000 | €1,000 |
| Silver | €3,000 | €2,400 | €600 |
| Bronze | €1,500 | €1,200 | €300 |
