= Alexis Mathieu =

French judoka (born 1999)

Personal information
- Born: 14 September 1999 (age 26)
- Occupation: Judoka

Sport
- Country: France
- Sport: Judo
- Weight class: ‍–‍90 kg

Achievements and titles
- World Champ.: R16 (2024)
- European Champ.: 5th (2025)
Medal record
Men's judo
Representing France
World Championships
Silver medal – second place	2021 Budapest	Mixed team
Silver medal – second place	2022 Tashkent	Mixed team
Silver medal – second place	2023 Doha	Mixed team
European Championships
Gold medal – first place	2022 Mulhouse	Mixed team
Gold medal – first place	2024 Zagreb	Mixed team
World Masters
Silver medal – second place	2022 Jerusalem	‍–‍90 kg
Bronze medal – third place	2023 Budapest	‍–‍90 kg
IJF Grand Slam
Silver medal – second place	2025 Tbilisi	‍–‍90 kg
Bronze medal – third place	2023 Ulaanbaatar	‍–‍90 kg
Bronze medal – third place	2025 Paris	‍–‍90 kg
Bronze medal – third place	2026 Paris	‍–‍90 kg
European U23 Championships
Bronze medal – third place	2020 Poreč	‍–‍90 kg
Bronze medal – third place	2021 Budapest	Mixed team

Profile at external databases
- IJF: 29725
- JudoInside.com: 110096
- Updated on 9 February 2026

Alexis Mathieu (born 14 September 1999) is a French judoka.

He won a medal at the 2021 World Judo Championships.

On 12 November 2022 he won a gold medal at the 2022 European Mixed Team Judo Championships as part of team France.
