= 2019 European Junior Judo Championships =

Judo competition

Judo 2019 European Junior Judo Championships
- Venue: Energia Areena
- Location: Vantaa, Finland
- Dates: 12–15 September 2019
- Competitors: 342 from 44 nations

Champions
- Mixed team: Russia (2nd title)

Competition at external databases
- Links: IJF • JudoInside

The 2019 European Junior Judo Championships is an edition of the European Junior Judo Championships, organised by the European Judo Union.It was held in Vantaa, Finland from 12 to 15 September 2019. The final day of competition featured a mixed team event, won by team Russia.

== Medal summary ==
=== Medal table ===
* Host nation (Finland)

Rank	Nation	Gold	Silver	Bronze	Total
1	Georgia (GEO)	6	1	2	9
2	France (FRA)	2	2	1	5
3	Russia (RUS)	1	2	5	8
4	Hungary (HUN)	1	1	2	4
5	Moldova (MDA)	1	1	0	2
6	Great Britain (GBR)	1	0	2	3
7	Portugal (POR)	1	0	0	1
7	Turkey (TUR)	1	0	0	1
9	Germany (GER)	0	2	2	4
10	Azerbaijan (AZE)	0	1	2	3
11	Italy (ITA)	0	1	1	2
11	Serbia (SRB)	0	1	1	2
11	Spain (ESP)	0	1	1	2
14	Ukraine (UKR)	0	1	0	1
15	Croatia (CRO)	0	0	2	2
15	Kosovo (KOS)	0	0	2	2
15	Latvia (LAT)	0	0	2	2
15	Netherlands (NED)	0	0	2	2
19	Austria (AUT)	0	0	1	1
Totals (19 entries)		14	14	28	56

=== Men's events ===
Event	Gold	Silver	Bronze
Extra-lightweight (-60 kg)	Salih Yıldız (TUR)	Rovshan Aliyev (AZE)	Ahmad Yusifov (AZE)
Extra-lightweight (-60 kg)	Salih Yıldız (TUR)	Rovshan Aliyev (AZE)	Abu Muslim Parchiev (RUS)
Half-lightweight (-66 kg)	Giorgi Tutashvili (GEO)	Adil Osmanov (MDA)	Ibrahim Aliyev (AZE)
Half-lightweight (-66 kg)	Giorgi Tutashvili (GEO)	Adil Osmanov (MDA)	Benjamin Gomes (FRA)
Lightweight (-73 kg)	Victor Sterpu (MDA)	David Gamosov (RUS)	Makhmadbek Makhmadbekov (RUS)
Lightweight (-73 kg)	Victor Sterpu (MDA)	David Gamosov (RUS)	Mathias Czizsek (AUT)
Half-middleweight (-81 kg)	Tato Grigalashvili (GEO)	Vladimir Akhalkatsi (GEO)	Aleksejs Zarudnevs (LAT)
Half-middleweight (-81 kg)	Tato Grigalashvili (GEO)	Vladimir Akhalkatsi (GEO)	Lachlan Moorhead (GBR)
Middleweight (-90 kg)	Lasha Bekauri (GEO)	Roland Gőz (HUN)	Darko Brašnjović (SRB)
Middleweight (-90 kg)	Lasha Bekauri (GEO)	Roland Gőz (HUN)	Mikheili Bekauri (GEO)
Half-heavyweight (-100 kg)	Ilia Sulamanidze (GEO)	Yevhen Vehera (UKR)	Emils Gerkens (LAT)
Half-heavyweight (-100 kg)	Ilia Sulamanidze (GEO)	Yevhen Vehera (UKR)	Zsombor Vég (HUN)
Heavyweight (+100 kg)	Gela Zaalishvili (GEO)	Erik Abramov (GER)	Dzhamal Gamzatkhanov (RUS)
Heavyweight (+100 kg)	Gela Zaalishvili (GEO)	Erik Abramov (GER)	Richárd Sipőcz (HUN)

=== Women's events ===
Event	Gold	Silver	Bronze
Extra-lightweight (-48 kg)	Irena Khubulova (RUS)	Shirine Boukli (FRA)	Mireia Lapuerta Comas (ESP)
Extra-lightweight (-48 kg)	Irena Khubulova (RUS)	Shirine Boukli (FRA)	Alina Sergeeva (RUS)
Half-lightweight (-52 kg)	Faïza Mokdar (FRA)	Nadežda Petrović (SRB)	Yasmin Javadian (GBR)
Half-lightweight (-52 kg)	Faïza Mokdar (FRA)	Nadežda Petrović (SRB)	Naomi van Krevel (NED)
Lightweight (-57 kg)	Eteri Liparteliani (GEO)	Silvia Pellitteri (ITA)	Seija Ballhaus (GER)
Lightweight (-57 kg)	Eteri Liparteliani (GEO)	Silvia Pellitteri (ITA)	Flaka Loxha (KOS)
Half-middleweight (-63 kg)	Szofi Özbas (HUN)	Annabelle Winzig (GER)	Dena Pohl (GER)
Half-middleweight (-63 kg)	Szofi Özbas (HUN)	Annabelle Winzig (GER)	Laura Fazliu (KOS)
Middleweight (-70 kg)	Kelly Petersen Pollard (GBR)	Ai Tsunoda (ESP)	Mariam Tchanturia (GEO)
Middleweight (-70 kg)	Kelly Petersen Pollard (GBR)	Ai Tsunoda (ESP)	Martina Esposito (ITA)
Half-heavyweight (-78 kg)	Patrícia Sampaio (POR)	Assia Said Errhamani (FRA)	Petrunjela Pavic (CRO)
Half-heavyweight (-78 kg)	Patrícia Sampaio (POR)	Assia Said Errhamani (FRA)	Daria Kariakina (RUS)
Heavyweight (+78 kg)	Léa Fontaine (FRA)	Daria Vladimirova (RUS)	Helena Vuković (CRO)
Heavyweight (+78 kg)	Léa Fontaine (FRA)	Daria Vladimirova (RUS)	Marit Kamps (NED)

Source Results

=== Mixed ===
Event	Gold	Silver	Bronze
Mixed team	Russia	Italy	Georgia
Mixed team	Russia	Italy	Germany

Source Results
