= 2021 Judo Grand Prix Zagreb =

Judo competition

Judo 2021 Judo Grand Prix Zagreb
- Venue: Arena Zagreb
- Location: Zagreb, Croatia
- Dates: 24–26 September 2021
- Competitors: 243, 35 from 35 nations
- Total prize money: 98,000€.

Competition at external databases
- Links: IJF • EJU • JudoInside

The 2021 Judo Grand Prix Zagreb was held in Zagreb, Croatia, from 24 to 26 September 2021.

== Event videos ==
The event will air freely on the IJF YouTube channel.

	Weight classes	Preliminaries			Final Block
Day 1	Men: -60, -66 Women: -48, -52, -57	Commentated			Commentated
Day 1	Men: -60, -66 Women: -48, -52, -57	Tatami 1	Tatami 2	Tatami 3	Commentated
Day 2	Men: -73, -81 Women: -63, -70	Commentated			Commentated
Day 2	Men: -73, -81 Women: -63, -70	Tatami 1	Tatami 2	Tatami 3	Commentated
Day 3	Men: -90, -100, +100 Women: -78, +78	Commentated			Commentated
Day 3	Men: -90, -100, +100 Women: -78, +78	Tatami 1	Tatami 2	Tatami 3	Commentated

== Medal summary ==
=== Men's events ===
Event	Gold	Silver	Bronze
Extra-lightweight (−60 kg)	Samuel Hall (GBR)	Angelo Pantano (ITA)	Jolan Florimont (FRA)
Extra-lightweight (−60 kg)	Samuel Hall (GBR)	Angelo Pantano (ITA)	Vincent Limare (FRA)
Half-lightweight (−66 kg)	Denis Vieru (MDA)	Abdula Abdulzhalilov (RUS)	Aram Grigoryan (RUS)
Half-lightweight (−66 kg)	Denis Vieru (MDA)	Abdula Abdulzhalilov (RUS)	Karo Marandian (UKR)
Lightweight (−73 kg)	Hidayat Heydarov (AZE)	Victor Sterpu (MDA)	Makhmadbek Makhmadbekov (RUS)
Lightweight (−73 kg)	Hidayat Heydarov (AZE)	Victor Sterpu (MDA)	Mark Hristov (BUL)
Half-middleweight (−81 kg)	Tato Grigalashvili (GEO)	Guilherme Schimidt (BRA)	Róbert Rajkai (HUN)
Half-middleweight (−81 kg)	Tato Grigalashvili (GEO)	Guilherme Schimidt (BRA)	Dorin Gotonoaga (MDA)
Middleweight (−90 kg)	Mammadali Mehdiyev (AZE)	Luka Maisuradze (GEO)	Wachid Borchashvili (AUT)
Middleweight (−90 kg)	Mammadali Mehdiyev (AZE)	Luka Maisuradze (GEO)	Khusen Khalmurzaev (RUS)
Half-heavyweight (−100 kg)	Arman Adamian (RUS)	Dario Kurbjeweit Garcia (GER)	Simeon Catharina (NED)
Half-heavyweight (−100 kg)	Arman Adamian (RUS)	Dario Kurbjeweit Garcia (GER)	Marko Kumrić (CRO)
Heavyweight (+100 kg)	Jur Spijkers (NED)	Vlăduț Simionescu (ROU)	Yevheniy Balyevskyy (UKR)
Heavyweight (+100 kg)	Jur Spijkers (NED)	Vlăduț Simionescu (ROU)	Martti Puumalainen (FIN)

=== Women's events ===
Event	Gold	Silver	Bronze
Extra-lightweight (−48 kg)	Blandine Pont (FRA)	Mélanie Vieu (FRA)	Amber Gersjes (NED)
Extra-lightweight (−48 kg)	Blandine Pont (FRA)	Mélanie Vieu (FRA)	Milica Nikolić (SRB)
Half-lightweight (−52 kg)	Amber Ryheul (BEL)	Astride Gneto (FRA)	Annika Würfel (GER)
Half-lightweight (−52 kg)	Amber Ryheul (BEL)	Astride Gneto (FRA)	Ana Viktorija Puljiz (CRO)
Lightweight (−57 kg)	Priscilla Gneto (FRA)	Pleuni Cornelisse (NED)	Kaja Kajzer (SLO)
Lightweight (−57 kg)	Priscilla Gneto (FRA)	Pleuni Cornelisse (NED)	Caroline Fritze (GER)
Half-middleweight (−63 kg)	Andreja Leški (SLO)	Geke van den Berg (NED)	Renata Zachová (CZE)
Half-middleweight (−63 kg)	Andreja Leški (SLO)	Geke van den Berg (NED)	Laura Fazliu (KOS)
Middleweight (−70 kg)	Anka Pogačnik (SLO)	Kelly Petersen Pollard (GBR)	Alina Lengweiler (SUI)
Middleweight (−70 kg)	Anka Pogačnik (SLO)	Kelly Petersen Pollard (GBR)	Katarzyna Sobierajska (POL)
Half-heavyweight (−78 kg)	Karen Stevenson (NED)	Patricija Brolih (SLO)	Teresa Zenker (GER)
Half-heavyweight (−78 kg)	Karen Stevenson (NED)	Patricija Brolih (SLO)	Emma Reid (GBR)
Heavyweight (+78 kg)	Julia Tolofua (FRA)	Mercédesz Szigetvári (HUN)	Laura Fuseau (FRA)
Heavyweight (+78 kg)	Julia Tolofua (FRA)	Mercédesz Szigetvári (HUN)	Renée Lucht (GER)

Source Results

=== Medal table ===
* Host nation (Croatia)

Rank	Nation	Gold	Silver	Bronze	Total
1	France (FRA)	3	2	3	8
2	Netherlands (NED)	2	2	2	6
3	Slovenia (SLO)	2	1	1	4
4	Azerbaijan (AZE)	2	0	0	2
5	Russia (RUS)	1	1	3	5
6	Great Britain (GBR)	1	1	1	3
6	Moldova (MDA)	1	1	1	3
8	Georgia (GEO)	1	1	0	2
9	Belgium (BEL)	1	0	0	1
10	Germany (GER)	0	1	4	5
11	Hungary (HUN)	0	1	1	2
12	Brazil (BRA)	0	1	0	1
12	Italy (ITA)	0	1	0	1
12	Romania (ROU)	0	1	0	1
15	Croatia (CRO)*	0	0	2	2
15	Ukraine (UKR)	0	0	2	2
17	Austria (AUT)	0	0	1	1
17	Bulgaria (BUL)	0	0	1	1
17	Czech Republic (CZE)	0	0	1	1
17	Finland (FIN)	0	0	1	1
17	Kosovo (KOS)	0	0	1	1
17	Poland (POL)	0	0	1	1
17	Serbia (SRB)	0	0	1	1
17	Switzerland (SUI)	0	0	1	1
Totals (24 entries)		14	14	28	56

== Prize money ==
The sums written are per medalist, bringing the total prizes awarded to €98,000. (retrieved from:)

Medal	Total	Judoka	Coach
Gold	€3,000	€2,400	€600
Silver	€2,000	€1,600	€400
Bronze	€1,000	€800	€200
