= 2013 European Junior Judo Championships =

Judo competition

Judo 2013 European Junior Judo Championships
- Venue: Zetra Olympic Hall
- Location: Sarajevo, Bosnia and Herzegovina
- Dates: 20–22 September 2013

Competition at external databases
- Links: EJU • JudoInside

The 2013 European Junior Judo Championships is an edition of the European Junior Judo Championships, organised by the European Judo Union. It was held in Sarajevo, Bosnia and Herzegovina from 20 to 22 September 2013.

== Medal summary ==
=== Medal table ===
* Host nation (Bosnia and Herzegovina)

Rank	Nation	Gold	Silver	Bronze	Total
1	Russia (RUS)	3	3	0	6
2	Georgia (GEO)	2	2	1	5
3	Azerbaijan (AZE)	2	0	3	5
4	Greece (GRE)	2	0	0	2
5	France (FRA)	1	4	0	5
6	Netherlands (NED)	1	1	1	3
6	Serbia (SRB)	1	1	1	3
8	Bulgaria (BUL)	1	0	1	2
8	Italy (ITA)	1	0	1	2
8	Switzerland (SUI)	1	0	1	2
11	Croatia (CRO)	1	0	0	1
12	Turkey (TUR)	0	2	0	2
13	Germany (GER)	0	1	4	5
14	Hungary (HUN)	0	1	3	4
15	Poland (POL)	0	1	1	2
16	Ukraine (UKR)	0	0	3	3
17	Belgium (BEL)	0	0	2	2
17	Romania (ROU)	0	0	2	2
19	Austria (AUT)	0	0	1	1
19	Belarus (BLR)	0	0	1	1
19	Great Britain (GBR)	0	0	1	1
19	Kosovo (KOS)	0	0	1	1
19	Moldova (MDA)	0	0	1	1
19	Portugal (POR)	0	0	1	1
19	Slovenia (SLO)	0	0	1	1
19	Spain (ESP)	0	0	1	1
Totals (26 entries)		16	16	32	64

=== Men's events ===
Event	Gold	Silver	Bronze
−55 kg	Davud Mammadsoy (AZE)	Vincent Manquest (FRA)	Akos Bartha (HUN)
−55 kg	Davud Mammadsoy (AZE)	Vincent Manquest (FRA)	Mehman Sadigov (AZE)
−60 kg	Rashad Rufullayev (AZE)	Ahmet Sahin Kaba (TUR)	Francisco Garrigós (ESP)
−60 kg	Rashad Rufullayev (AZE)	Ahmet Sahin Kaba (TUR)	Oruj Valizada (AZE)
−66 kg	Georgios Azoidis (GRE)	Anthony Zingg (GER)	Ilija Ciganovic (SRB)
−66 kg	Georgios Azoidis (GRE)	Anthony Zingg (GER)	Martin Végvári (HUN)
−73 kg	Vedat Albayrak (GRE)	Levan Gugava (GEO)	Sami Chouchi (BEL)
−73 kg	Vedat Albayrak (GRE)	Levan Gugava (GEO)	Nuno Saraiva (POR)
−81 kg	Aslan Lappinagov (RUS)	Tomasz Szczepaniak (POL)	Ivaylo Ivanov (BUL)
−81 kg	Aslan Lappinagov (RUS)	Tomasz Szczepaniak (POL)	Mammadali Mehdiyev (AZE)
−90 kg	Beka Gviniashvili (GEO)	Michael Korrel (NED)	Gergö Fogasy (HUN)
−90 kg	Beka Gviniashvili (GEO)	Michael Korrel (NED)	David Tekic (GER)
−100 kg	Guram Tushishvili (GEO)	Nabil Machtrou (FRA)	Toma Nikiforov (BEL)
−100 kg	Guram Tushishvili (GEO)	Nabil Machtrou (FRA)	Leon Strueber (GER)
+100 kg	Anton Krivobokov (RUS)	Levani Matiashvili (GEO)	Iakiv Khammo (UKR)
+100 kg	Anton Krivobokov (RUS)	Levani Matiashvili (GEO)	Giorgi Zakariadze (GEO)

=== Women's events ===
Event	Gold	Silver	Bronze
−44 kg	Borislava Damyanova (BUL)	Julijana Savic (SRB)	Maruša Štangar (SLO)
−44 kg	Borislava Damyanova (BUL)	Julijana Savic (SRB)	Andreea Stefanescu (ROU)
−48 kg	Irina Dolgova (RUS)	Anna Dmitrieva (RUS)	Cristina Budescu (MDA)
−48 kg	Irina Dolgova (RUS)	Anna Dmitrieva (RUS)	Tamara Silva (SUI)
−52 kg	Odette Giuffrida (ITA)	Julia Rosso (FRA)	Alexandra-Larisa Florian (ROU)
−52 kg	Odette Giuffrida (ITA)	Julia Rosso (FRA)	Distria Krasniqi (KOS)
−57 kg	Fabienne Kocher (SUI)	Daria Mezhetskaia (RUS)	Nekoda Smythe-Davis (GBR)
−57 kg	Fabienne Kocher (SUI)	Daria Mezhetskaia (RUS)	Arleta Podolak (POL)
−63 kg	Do Velema (NED)	Szabina Gercsák (HUN)	Daniela Kazanoi (BLR)
−63 kg	Do Velema (NED)	Szabina Gercsák (HUN)	Magdalena Krssakova (AUT)
−70 kg	Barbara Matić (CRO)	Dariko Gabaidze (RUS)	Valeria Ferrari (ITA)
−70 kg	Barbara Matić (CRO)	Dariko Gabaidze (RUS)	Lea Pueschel (GER)
−78 kg	Madeleine Malonga (FRA)	Sama Hawa Camara (FRA)	Karen Stevenson (NED)
−78 kg	Madeleine Malonga (FRA)	Sama Hawa Camara (FRA)	Anastasiya Turchyn (UKR)
+78 kg	Milica Zabic (SRB)	Kübra Kara (TUR)	Anastasiia Komovych (UKR)
+78 kg	Milica Zabic (SRB)	Kübra Kara (TUR)	Clarissa Taube (GER)

Source Results
