= Frank de Wit =

Dutch judoka (born 1996)

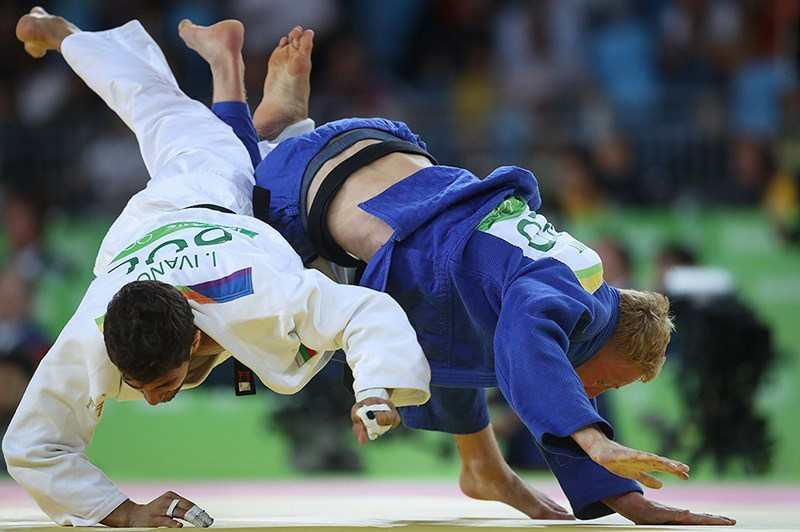
- De Wit (right) against Ivanov during the 2016 Olympics

Personal information
- Nationality: Dutch
- Born: 13 February 1996 (age 30) Beverwijk, Netherlands
- Occupation: Judoka

Sport
- Country: Netherlands
- Sport: Judo
- Weight class: ‍–‍81 kg, ‍–‍90 kg
- Club: Kraftsportverein Esslingen 1894

Achievements and titles
- Olympic Games: R16 (2020, 2024)
- World Champ.: (bronze) (2021)
- European Champ.: (silver) (2024)
Medal record
Men's judo
Representing the Netherlands
World Championships
Bronze medal – third place	2021 Budapest	‍–‍81 kg
Bronze medal – third place	2023 Doha	Mixed team
European Games
Bronze medal – third place	2023 Kraków	Mixed team
European Championships
Silver medal – second place	2022 Mulhouse	Mixed team
Silver medal – second place	2024 Zagreb	‍–‍81 kg
World Masters
Silver medal – second place	2021 Doha	‍–‍81 kg
Bronze medal – third place	2017 Saint Petersburg	‍–‍81 kg
Bronze medal – third place	2018 Guangzhou	‍–‍81 kg
IJF Grand Slam
Gold medal – first place	2017 Paris	‍–‍81 kg
Gold medal – first place	2017 Abu Dhabi	‍–‍81 kg
Silver medal – second place	2023 Abu Dhabi	‍–‍81 kg
Bronze medal – third place	2015 Paris	‍–‍81 kg
Bronze medal – third place	2016 Abu Dhabi	‍–‍81 kg
Bronze medal – third place	2017 Tokyo	‍–‍81 kg
Bronze medal – third place	2018 Paris	‍–‍81 kg
Bronze medal – third place	2018 Abu Dhabi	‍–‍81 kg
Bronze medal – third place	2019 Osaka	‍–‍81 kg
Bronze medal – third place	2020 Düsseldorf	‍–‍81 kg
Bronze medal – third place	2021 Tel Aviv	‍–‍81 kg
Bronze medal – third place	2022 Ulaanbaatar	‍–‍81 kg
Bronze medal – third place	2024 Baku	‍–‍81 kg
Bronze medal – third place	2025 Baku	‍–‍90 kg
IJF Grand Prix
Gold medal – first place	2019 Tbilisi	‍–‍81 kg
Silver medal – second place	2018 The Hague	‍–‍81 kg
Bronze medal – third place	2015 Zagreb	‍–‍81 kg
Bronze medal – third place	2018 Cancún	‍–‍81 kg
Bronze medal – third place	2023 Almada	‍–‍81 kg
World Juniors Championships
Gold medal – first place	2015 Abu Dhabi	‍–‍81 kg
European Junior Championships
Gold medal – first place	2015 Oberwart	‍–‍81 kg
World Cadets Championships
Silver medal – second place	2013 Miami	‍–‍81 kg
European Cadet Championships
Silver medal – second place	2013 Tallinn	‍–‍81 kg
Summer Youth Olympics
Bronze medal – third place	2014 Nanjing	‍–‍81 kg

Profile at external databases
- IJF: 13509
- JudoInside.com: 17245
- Updated on 16 February 2025

Frank de Wit (born 13 February 1996) is a Dutch judoka. He competed at the 2016 Summer Olympics in the men's 81 kg event, in which he was eliminated by Ivaylo Ivanov in the second round.

In January 2021, he won the silver medal in his event at the 2021 Judo World Masters held in Doha, Qatar. In June 2021, he won one of the bronze medals in the men's 81 kg at the 2021 World Judo Championships held in Budapest, Hungary.

On 12 November 2022 he won a silver medal at the 2022 European Mixed Team Judo Championships as part of team Netherlands.
