= 2024 Judo Grand Slam Abu Dhabi =

Judo Competition

Judo 2024 Judo Grand Slam Abu Dhabi
- Venue: Mubadala Arena
- Location: Abu Dhabi, United Arab Emirates
- Dates: 11–13 October 2024
- Competitors: 219 from 29 nations
- Total prize money: €154,000

Competition at external databases
- Links: IJF • JudoInside

The 2024 Judo Grand Slam Abu Dhabi is a Judo Grand Slam tournament that was held at the Mubadala Arena in Abu Dhabi, United Arab Emirates from 11 to 13 October 2024 as part of the IJF World Tour.

== Medal summary ==
=== Men's events ===
Event	Gold	Silver	Bronze
Extra-lightweight (−60 kg)	Iznaur Saaev (IJF)	Cédric Revol (FRA)	Dauren Syukenov (KAZ)
Extra-lightweight (−60 kg)	Iznaur Saaev (IJF)	Cédric Revol (FRA)	Emiel Jaring (NED)
Half-lightweight (−66 kg)	Murad Chopanov (IJF)	Daikii Bouba (FRA)	Obid Dzhebov (TJK)
Half-lightweight (−66 kg)	Murad Chopanov (IJF)	Daikii Bouba (FRA)	Mukhriddin Tilovov (UZB)
Lightweight (−73 kg)	Makhmadbek Makhmadbekov (UAE)	Abubakr Sherov (TJK)	Danil Lavrentev (IJF)
Lightweight (−73 kg)	Makhmadbek Makhmadbekov (UAE)	Abubakr Sherov (TJK)	Tatsuki Ishihara (JPN)
Half-middleweight (−81 kg)	Zelim Tckaev (AZE)	Zaur Dvalashvili (GEO)	David Karapetyan (IJF)
Half-middleweight (−81 kg)	Zelim Tckaev (AZE)	Zaur Dvalashvili (GEO)	Dimitri Gochilaidze (GEO)
Middleweight (−90 kg)	Mansur Lorsanov (IJF)	Jesper Smink (NED)	Giovani Ferreira (BRA)
Middleweight (−90 kg)	Mansur Lorsanov (IJF)	Jesper Smink (NED)	Murad Fatiyev (AZE)
Half-heavyweight (−100 kg)	Michael Korrel (NED)	Niyaz Bilalov (IJF)	Arman Adamian (IJF)
Half-heavyweight (−100 kg)	Michael Korrel (NED)	Niyaz Bilalov (IJF)	Dzhakhongir Madzhidov (TJK)
Heavyweight (+100 kg)	Valeriy Endovitskiy (IJF)	Ushangi Kokauri (AZE)	Jelle Snippe (NED)
Heavyweight (+100 kg)	Valeriy Endovitskiy (IJF)	Ushangi Kokauri (AZE)	Utkirbek Turoboyev (UZB)

Source results:

=== Women's events ===
Event	Gold	Silver	Bronze
Extra-lightweight (−48 kg)	Sabina Giliazova (IJF)	Andrea Stojadinov (SRB)	Abiba Abuzhakynova (KAZ)
Extra-lightweight (−48 kg)	Sabina Giliazova (IJF)	Andrea Stojadinov (SRB)	Mélanie Clément (FRA)
Half-lightweight (−52 kg)	Bishreltiin Khorloodoi (UAE)	Lkhagvasürengiin Sosorbaram (MGL)	Léa Métrot (FRA)
Half-lightweight (−52 kg)	Bishreltiin Khorloodoi (UAE)	Lkhagvasürengiin Sosorbaram (MGL)	Róza Gyertyás (HUN)
Lightweight (−57 kg)	Seija Ballhaus (GER)	Irina Zueva (IJF)	Acelya Toprak (AZE)
Lightweight (−57 kg)	Seija Ballhaus (GER)	Irina Zueva (IJF)	Shirlen Nascimento (BRA)
Half-middleweight (−63 kg)	Manon Deketer (FRA)	Iva Oberan (CRO)	Joanne van Lieshout (NED)
Half-middleweight (−63 kg)	Manon Deketer (FRA)	Iva Oberan (CRO)	Carlotta Avanzato (ITA)
Middleweight (−70 kg)	Margit de Voogd (NED)	Hilde Jager (NED)	Lara Cvjetko (CRO)
Middleweight (−70 kg)	Margit de Voogd (NED)	Hilde Jager (NED)	Anđela Violić (CRO)
Half-heavyweight (−78 kg)	Anna Monta Olek (GER)	Chloé Buttigieg (FRA)	Miglė Dudėnaitė (LTU)
Half-heavyweight (−78 kg)	Anna Monta Olek (GER)	Chloé Buttigieg (FRA)	Zanet Michaelidou (CYP)
Heavyweight (+78 kg)	Coralie Hayme (FRA)	Karen Stevenson (NED)	Helena Vuković (CRO)
Heavyweight (+78 kg)	Coralie Hayme (FRA)	Karen Stevenson (NED)	Nazgul Maratova (KAZ)

Source results:

=== Medal table ===
* Host nation (United Arab Emirates)

Rank	Nation	Gold	Silver	Bronze	Total
–	International Judo Federation (IJF)	5	2	3	10
1	Netherlands (NED)	2	3	3	8
2	France (FRA)	2	3	2	7
3	Germany (GER)	2	0	0	2
3	United Arab Emirates (UAE)*	2	0	0	2
5	Azerbaijan (AZE)	1	1	2	4
6	Croatia (CRO)	0	1	3	4
7	Tajikistan (TJK)	0	1	2	3
8	Georgia (GEO)	0	1	1	2
9	Mongolia (MGL)	0	1	0	1
9	Serbia (SRB)	0	1	0	1
11	Kazakhstan (KAZ)	0	0	3	3
12	Brazil (BRA)	0	0	2	2
12	Uzbekistan (UZB)	0	0	2	2
14	Cyprus (CYP)	0	0	1	1
14	Hungary (HUN)	0	0	1	1
14	Italy (ITA)	0	0	1	1
14	Japan (JPN)	0	0	1	1
14	Lithuania (LTU)	0	0	1	1
Totals (18 entries)		14	14	28	56

== Prize money ==
The sums written are per medalist, bringing the total prizes awarded to €154,000. (retrieved from:)

Medal	Total	Judoka	Coach
Gold	€5,000	€4,000	€1,000
Silver	€3,000	€2,400	€600
Bronze	€1,500	€1,200	€300
