= 2020 European U23 Judo Championships =

Judo 2020 European U23 Judo Championships
- Location: Poreč, Croatia
- Dates: 9–10 November 2020
- Competitors: 327 from 36 nations

Competition at external databases
- Links: IJF • JudoInside

The 2020 European U23 Judo Championships were an edition of the European U23 Judo Championships, organised by the European Judo Union. It was held in Poreč, Croatia from 9–10 November 2020.

== Medal overview ==
=== Men ===
| Event | Gold | Silver | Bronze |
|---|---|---|---|
| Extra-lightweight (−60 kg) | Konstantin Simeonidis (RUS) | Temur Nozadze (GEO) | Turan Bayramov (AZE) |
| Extra-lightweight (−60 kg) | Konstantin Simeonidis (RUS) | Temur Nozadze (GEO) | Jaba Papinashvili (GEO) |
| Half-lightweight (−66 kg) | Mattia Miceli (ITA) | Robert Klačar (CRO) | Bagrati Niniashvili (GEO) |
| Half-lightweight (−66 kg) | Mattia Miceli (ITA) | Robert Klačar (CRO) | Nurlan Osmanov (AZE) |
| Lightweight (−73 kg) | Victor Sterpu (MDA) | Makhmadbek Makhmadbekov (RUS) | Yehonatan Elbaz (ISR) |
| Lightweight (−73 kg) | Victor Sterpu (MDA) | Makhmadbek Makhmadbekov (RUS) | Yannick Van der Kolk (NED) |
| Half-middleweight (−81 kg) | Tato Grigalashvili (GEO) | Lukas Wittwer (SUI) | Vladimir Akhalkatsi (GEO) |
| Half-middleweight (−81 kg) | Tato Grigalashvili (GEO) | Lukas Wittwer (SUI) | Hievorh Manukian (UKR) |
| Middleweight (−90 kg) | Luka Maisuradze (GEO) | Ekubzhon Nazirov (RUS) | Roland Gőz (HUN) |
| Middleweight (−90 kg) | Luka Maisuradze (GEO) | Ekubzhon Nazirov (RUS) | Alexis Mathieu (FRA) |
| Half-heavyweight (−100 kg) | Mathias Madsen (DEN) | Zsombor Vég (HUN) | Onise Saneblidze (GEO) |
| Half-heavyweight (−100 kg) | Mathias Madsen (DEN) | Zsombor Vég (HUN) | Eduard Serban (ROU) |
| Heavyweight (+100 kg) | Richárd Sipőcz (HUN) | Gela Zaalishvili (GEO) | Jamal Feyziyev (AZE) |
| Heavyweight (+100 kg) | Richárd Sipőcz (HUN) | Gela Zaalishvili (GEO) | Kemal Kaitov (RUS) |

=== Women ===
| Event | Gold | Silver | Bronze |
|---|---|---|---|
| Extra-lightweight (−48 kg) | Mélanie Vieu (FRA) | Irena Khubulova (RUS) | Blandine Pont (FRA) |
| Extra-lightweight (−48 kg) | Mélanie Vieu (FRA) | Irena Khubulova (RUS) | Andrea Stojadinov (SRB) |
| Half-lightweight (−52 kg) | Nina Estefania Esteo Linne (ESP) | Gultaj Mammadaliyeva (AZE) | Anais Mosdier (FRA) |
| Half-lightweight (−52 kg) | Nina Estefania Esteo Linne (ESP) | Gultaj Mammadaliyeva (AZE) | Nadežda Petrović (SRB) |
| Lightweight (−57 kg) | Pleuni Cornelisse (NED) | Gaëtane Deberdt (FRA) | Marica Perišić (SRB) |
| Lightweight (−57 kg) | Pleuni Cornelisse (NED) | Gaëtane Deberdt (FRA) | Vera Zemanova (CZE) |
| Half-middleweight (−63 kg) | Joanne van Lieshout (NED) | Angelika Szymańska (POL) | Laura Fazliu (KOS) |
| Half-middleweight (−63 kg) | Joanne van Lieshout (NED) | Angelika Szymańska (POL) | Natalia Kropska (POL) |
| Middleweight (−70 kg) | Lara Cvjetko (CRO) | Maya Goshen (ISR) | Ida Eriksson (SWE) |
| Middleweight (−70 kg) | Lara Cvjetko (CRO) | Maya Goshen (ISR) | Donja Vos (NED) |
| Half-heavyweight (−78 kg) | Inbar Lanir (ISR) | Karla Prodan (CRO) | Metka Lobnik (SLO) |
| Half-heavyweight (−78 kg) | Inbar Lanir (ISR) | Karla Prodan (CRO) | Renee Van Harselaar (NED) |
| Heavyweight (+78 kg) | Laura Fuseau (FRA) | Kubranur Esir (TUR) | Sofiia Pirogova (RUS) |
| Heavyweight (+78 kg) | Laura Fuseau (FRA) | Kubranur Esir (TUR) | Mercedesz Szigetvári (HUN) |

=== Medal table ===
* Host nation (Croatia)

| Rank | Nation | Gold | Silver | Bronze | Total |
|---|---|---|---|---|---|
| 1 | Georgia (GEO) | 2 | 2 | 4 | 8 |
| 2 | France (FRA) | 2 | 1 | 3 | 6 |
| 3 | Netherlands (NED) | 2 | 0 | 3 | 5 |
| 4 | Russia (RUS) | 1 | 3 | 2 | 6 |
| 5 | Croatia (CRO)* | 1 | 2 | 0 | 3 |
| 6 | Hungary (HUN) | 1 | 1 | 2 | 4 |
| 7 | Israel (ISR) | 1 | 1 | 1 | 3 |
| 8 | Denmark (DEN) | 1 | 0 | 0 | 1 |
| 8 | Italy (ITA) | 1 | 0 | 0 | 1 |
| 8 | Moldova (MDA) | 1 | 0 | 0 | 1 |
| 8 | Spain (ESP) | 1 | 0 | 0 | 1 |
| 12 | Azerbaijan (AZE) | 0 | 1 | 3 | 4 |
| 13 | Poland (POL) | 0 | 1 | 1 | 2 |
| 14 | Switzerland (SUI) | 0 | 1 | 0 | 1 |
| 14 | Turkey (TUR) | 0 | 1 | 0 | 1 |
| 16 | Serbia (SRB) | 0 | 0 | 3 | 3 |
| 17 | Czech Republic (CZE) | 0 | 0 | 1 | 1 |
| 17 | Kosovo (KOS) | 0 | 0 | 1 | 1 |
| 17 | Romania (ROU) | 0 | 0 | 1 | 1 |
| 17 | Slovenia (SLO) | 0 | 0 | 1 | 1 |
| 17 | Sweden (SWE) | 0 | 0 | 1 | 1 |
| 17 | Ukraine (UKR) | 0 | 0 | 1 | 1 |
| Totals (22 entries) | | 14 | 14 | 28 | 56 |
