= Gela Zaalishvili =

Georgian judoka (born 1999)

Personal information
- Nationality: Georgian
- Born: 19 August 1999 (age 26)
- Occupation: Judoka

Sport
- Country: Georgia
- Sport: Judo
- Weight class: +100 kg

Achievements and titles
- World Champ.: 5th (2021)
Medal record
Men's judo
Representing Georgia
World Championships
Bronze medal – third place	2023 Doha	Mixed team
European Games
Gold medal – first place	2023 Kraków	Mixed team
European Championships
Gold medal – first place	2021 Ufa	Mixed team
World Masters
Bronze medal – third place	2023 Budapest	+100 kg
IJF Grand Slam
Gold medal – first place	2019 Baku	+100 kg
Gold medal – first place	2021 Tel Aviv	+100 kg
Gold medal – first place	2021 Tbilisi	+100 kg
Gold medal – first place	2022 Tbilisi	+100 kg
Gold medal – first place	2023 Tbilisi	+100 kg
Bronze medal – third place	2020 Budapest	+100 kg
Bronze medal – third place	2023 Tashkent	+100 kg
IJF Grand Prix
Gold medal – first place	2019 Zagreb	+100 kg
Bronze medal – third place	2019 Budapest	+100 kg
European U23 Championships
Silver medal – second place	2020 Poreč	+100 kg
Bronze medal – third place	2017 Podgorica	+100 kg
Bronze medal – third place	2021 Budapest	+100 kg
World Juniors Championships
Gold medal – first place	2018 Nassau	+100 kg
Bronze medal – third place	2019 Marrakesh	Mixed team
European Junior Championships
Gold medal – first place	2018 Sofia	+100 kg
Gold medal – first place	2019 Vantaa	+100 kg
Silver medal – second place	2017 Maribor	Men's team
Bronze medal – third place	2017 Maribor	+100 kg
European Cadet Championships
Bronze medal – third place	2015 Sofia	+90 kg

Profile at external databases
- IJF: 20522
- JudoInside.com: 96783
- Updated on 7 August 2023

Gela Zaalishvili (born 19 August 1999) is a Georgian judoka.

He is the gold medallist of the 2021 Judo Grand Slam Tbilisi in the +100 kg category.
