= Renée Lucht =

German judoka (born 1998)

Personal information
- Born: 17 September 1998 (age 27)
- Occupation: Judoka

Sport
- Country: Germany
- Sport: Judo
- Weight class: +78 kg

Achievements and titles
- Olympic Games: R32 (2024)
- European Champ.: R16 (2021, 2024)
Medal record
Women's judo
Representing Germany
European Games
Silver medal – second place	2023 Kraków	Mixed team
European Championships
Bronze medal – third place	2024 Zagreb	Mixed team
IJF Grand Slam
Gold medal – first place	2021 Baku	+78 kg
Gold medal – first place	2024 Tbilisi	+78 kg
IJF Grand Prix
Bronze medal – third place	2021 Zagreb	+78 kg
Bronze medal – third place	2023 Perth	+78 kg
European U23 Championships
Silver medal – second place	2019 Izhevsk	+78 kg
Bronze medal – third place	2017 Podgorica	+78 kg
World Juniors Championships
Bronze medal – third place	2018 Nassau	+78 kg
European Junior Championships
Silver medal – second place	2018 Sofia	+78 kg

Profile at external databases
- IJF: 23218
- JudoInside.com: 4336
- Updated on 3 August 2024

Renée Lucht (born 17 September 1998) is a German judoka.

Lucht is the gold medalist of the 2021 Judo Grand Slam Baku in the +78 kg category.
