= 2023 Judo Grand Prix Linz =

Judo competition

Judo 2023 Judo Grand Prix Linz
- Venue: TipsArena Linz
- Location: Linz, Austria
- Dates: 25–27 May 2023
- Competitors: 454 from 72 nations
- Total prize money: €98,000

Competition at external databases
- Links: IJF • EJU • JudoInside

The 2023 Judo Grand Prix Linz was held at the TipsArena in Linz, Austria from 25 to 27 May 2023 as part of the IJF World Tour and during the 2024 Summer Olympics qualification period.

== Medal summary ==
=== Men's events ===
Event	Gold	Silver	Bronze
Extra-lightweight (−60 kg)	Romain Valadier-Picard (FRA)	Dilshot Khalmatov (UKR)	Artem Lesiuk (UKR)
Extra-lightweight (−60 kg)	Romain Valadier-Picard (FRA)	Dilshot Khalmatov (UKR)	Petros Christodoulides (CYP)
Half-lightweight (−66 kg)	David García Torné (ESP)	Kamran Suleymanov (AZE)	Alberto Gaitero (ESP)
Half-lightweight (−66 kg)	David García Torné (ESP)	Kamran Suleymanov (AZE)	Fabio Basile (ITA)
Lightweight (−73 kg)	Tohar Butbul (ISR)	Rashid Mammadaliyev (AZE)	Adil Osmanov (MDA)
Lightweight (−73 kg)	Tohar Butbul (ISR)	Rashid Mammadaliyev (AZE)	Petru Pelivan (MDA)
Half-middleweight (−81 kg)	Shamil Borchashvili (AUT)	Mykhailo Svidrak (UKR)	Dimitri Gochilaidze (GEO)
Half-middleweight (−81 kg)	Shamil Borchashvili (AUT)	Mykhailo Svidrak (UKR)	Zaur Dvalashvili (GEO)
Middleweight (−90 kg)	Krisztián Tóth (HUN)	Axel Clerget (FRA)	Marcelo Gomes (BRA)
Middleweight (−90 kg)	Krisztián Tóth (HUN)	Axel Clerget (FRA)	Thomas Scharfetter (AUT)
Half-heavyweight (−100 kg)	Leonardo Gonçalves (BRA)	Louis Mai (GER)	Mathias Madsen (DEN)
Half-heavyweight (−100 kg)	Leonardo Gonçalves (BRA)	Louis Mai (GER)	Mert Şişmanlar (TUR)
Heavyweight (+100 kg)	Lukáš Krpálek (CZE)	Losseni Kone (GER)	Enej Marinič (SLO)
Heavyweight (+100 kg)	Lukáš Krpálek (CZE)	Losseni Kone (GER)	Jelle Snippe (NED)

=== Women's events ===
Event	Gold	Silver	Bronze
Extra-lightweight (−48 kg)	Maruša Štangar (SLO)	Laura Martínez (ESP)	Francesca Milani (ITA)
Extra-lightweight (−48 kg)	Maruša Štangar (SLO)	Laura Martínez (ESP)	Tomoka Arakawa (JPN)
Half-lightweight (−52 kg)	Kisumi Omori (JPN)	Róza Gyertyás (HUN)	Maria Siderot (POR)
Half-lightweight (−52 kg)	Kisumi Omori (JPN)	Róza Gyertyás (HUN)	Gultaj Mammadaliyeva (AZE)
Lightweight (−57 kg)	Pleuni Cornelisse (NED)	Seija Ballhaus (GER)	Akari Omori (JPN)
Lightweight (−57 kg)	Pleuni Cornelisse (NED)	Seija Ballhaus (GER)	Daria Bilodid (UKR)
Half-middleweight (−63 kg)	Momo Tatsukawa (JPN)	Seiko Watanabe (JPN)	Manon Deketer (FRA)
Half-middleweight (−63 kg)	Momo Tatsukawa (JPN)	Seiko Watanabe (JPN)	Prisca Awiti Alcaraz (MEX)
Middleweight (−70 kg)	María Pérez (PUR)	Kelly Petersen Pollard (GBR)	Giovanna Scoccimarro (GER)
Middleweight (−70 kg)	María Pérez (PUR)	Kelly Petersen Pollard (GBR)	Hilde Jager (NED)
Half-heavyweight (−78 kg)	Anna-Maria Wagner (GER)	Madeleine Malonga (FRA)	Yelyzaveta Lytvynenko (UKR)
Half-heavyweight (−78 kg)	Anna-Maria Wagner (GER)	Madeleine Malonga (FRA)	Lieke Derks (NED)
Heavyweight (+78 kg)	Ruri Takahashi (JPN)	Asya Tavano (ITA)	Karen Stevenson (NED)
Heavyweight (+78 kg)	Ruri Takahashi (JPN)	Asya Tavano (ITA)	Giovanna Santos (BRA)

Source results:

=== Medal table ===
* Host nation (Austria)

Rank	Nation	Gold	Silver	Bronze	Total
1	Japan (JPN)	3	1	2	6
2	Germany (GER)	1	3	1	5
3	France (FRA)	1	2	1	4
4	Spain (ESP)	1	1	1	3
5	Hungary (HUN)	1	1	0	2
6	Netherlands (NED)	1	0	4	5
7	Brazil (BRA)	1	0	2	3
8	Austria (AUT)*	1	0	1	2
8	Slovenia (SLO)	1	0	1	2
10	Czech Republic (CZE)	1	0	0	1
10	Israel (ISR)	1	0	0	1
10	Puerto Rico (PUR)	1	0	0	1
13	Ukraine (UKR)	0	2	3	5
14	Azerbaijan (AZE)	0	2	1	3
15	Italy (ITA)	0	1	2	3
16	Great Britain (GBR)	0	1	0	1
17	Georgia (GEO)	0	0	2	2
17	Moldova (MDA)	0	0	2	2
19	Cyprus (CYP)	0	0	1	1
19	Denmark (DEN)	0	0	1	1
19	Mexico (MEX)	0	0	1	1
19	Portugal (POR)	0	0	1	1
19	Turkey (TUR)	0	0	1	1
Totals (23 entries)		14	14	28	56

== Prize money ==
The sums written are per medalist, bringing the total prizes awarded to €98,000. (retrieved from:)

Medal	Total	Judoka	Coach
Gold	€3,000	€2,400	€600
Silver	€2,000	€1,600	€400
Bronze	€1,000	€800	€200
