= Jelle Snippe =

Dutch judoka (born 1998)

Personal information
- Nationality: Dutch
- Born: 19 September 1998 (age 27) Enschede, Netherlands
- Occupation: Judoka

Sport
- Country: Netherlands
- Sport: Judo
- Weight class: ‍–‍100 kg / +100 kg

Achievements and titles
- Olympic Games: R32 (2024)
- World Champ.: R16 (2024)
- European Champ.: (bronze) (2023)
Medal record
Men's judo
Representing the Netherlands
European Games
Bronze medal – third place	2023 Kraków	Mixed team
European Championships
Silver medal – second place	2022 Mulhouse	Mixed team
Bronze medal – third place	2023 Montpellier	+100 kg
IJF Grand Slam
Gold medal – first place	2023 Antalya	+100 kg
Silver medal – second place	2022 Budapest	+100 kg
Bronze medal – third place	2023 Abu Dhabi	+100 kg
Bronze medal – third place	2024 Baku	+100 kg
Bronze medal – third place	2024 Abu Dhabi	+100 kg
IJF Grand Prix
Bronze medal – third place	2017 The Hague	‍–‍100 kg
Bronze medal – third place	2023 Linz	+100 kg
Bronze medal – third place	2025 Linz	+100 kg
European U23 Championships
Bronze medal – third place	2019 Izhevsk	‍–‍100 kg

Profile at external databases
- IJF: 19293
- JudoInside.com: 42357
- Updated on 9 March 2025

Jelle Snippe (born 19 September 1998) is a Dutch judoka.

Snippe is a bronze medalist from the 2017 Judo Grand Prix The Hague in the ‍–‍100 kg.

On 12 November 2022 Snippe won a silver medal at the 2022 European Mixed Team Judo Championships as part of team Netherlands.
