= Sama Hawa Camara =

French judoka (born 1994)

Personal information
- Born: 22 December 1994 (age 31)
- Occupation: Judoka

Sport
- Country: France
- Sport: Judo
- Weight class: ‍–‍78 kg
Medal record
Women's judo
Representing France
IJF Grand Slam
Bronze medal – third place	2017 Paris	‍–‍78 kg
IJF Grand Prix
Silver medal – second place	2017 Zagreb	‍–‍78 kg
Silver medal – second place	2017 Tbilisi	‍–‍78 kg
Silver medal – second place	2018 The Hague	‍–‍78 kg
Bronze medal – third place	2014 Samsun	‍–‍78 kg
Bronze medal – third place	2016 Zagreb	‍–‍78 kg
Bronze medal – third place	2018 Hohhot	‍–‍78 kg
World Juniors Championships
Silver medal – second place	2014 Fort Lauderdale	‍–‍78 kg
European Junior Championships
Silver medal – second place	2013 Sarajevo	‍–‍78 kg
Bronze medal – third place	2014 Bucharest	‍–‍78 kg
Summer Universiade
Gold medal – first place	2015 Gwangju	‍–‍78 kg

Profile at external databases
- IJF: 14883
- JudoInside.com: 83114
- Updated on 25 November 2022

Sama Hawa Camara (born 22 December 1994) is a French judoka.

Camara is a bronze medalist from the 2017 Judo Grand Slam Paris in the ‍–‍78 kg category.
