= Karen Stevenson =

Dutch judoka (born 1993)

Personal information
- Nationality: Dutch
- Born: 30 July 1993 (age 32) Heiloo, Netherlands
- Occupation: Judoka

Sport
- Country: Netherlands
- Sport: Judo
- Weight class: ‍–‍78 kg, +78 kg

Achievements and titles
- World Champ.: 7th (2024, 2025)
- European Champ.: 5th (2017, 2018, 2023)
Medal record
Women's judo
Representing the Netherlands
World Championships
Bronze medal – third place	2023 Doha	Mixed team
European Games
Bronze medal – third place	2023 Kraków	Mixed team
European Championships
Silver medal – second place	2022 Mulhouse	Mixed team
World Masters
Bronze medal – third place	2017 Saint Petersburg	‍–‍78 kg
IJF Grand Slam
Silver medal – second place	2021 Tbilisi	‍–‍78 kg
Silver medal – second place	2024 Abu Dhabi	+78 kg
Bronze medal – third place	2022 Tbilisi	‍–‍78 kg
Bronze medal – third place	2023 Tel Aviv	+78 kg
Bronze medal – third place	2023 Tbilisi	+78 kg
IJF Grand Prix
Gold medal – first place	2021 Zagreb	‍–‍78 kg
Silver medal – second place	2017 Hohhot	‍–‍78 kg
Silver medal – second place	2018 Tunis	‍–‍78 kg
Bronze medal – third place	2016 Budapest	‍–‍78 kg
Bronze medal – third place	2017 The Hague	‍–‍78 kg
Bronze medal – third place	2023 Almada	+78 kg
Bronze medal – third place	2023 Linz	+78 kg
European U23 Championships
Bronze medal – third place	2014 Wrocław	‍–‍78 kg
European Junior Championships
Bronze medal – third place	2013 Sarajevo	‍–‍78 kg

Profile at external databases
- IJF: 9282
- JudoInside.com: 38487
- Updated on 19 June 2025

Karen Stevenson (born 30 July 1993) is a Dutch judoka.

She is the silver medalist of the 2021 Judo Grand Slam Tbilisi in the ‍–‍78 kg category.

She lost her bronze medal match in her event at the 2022 Judo Grand Slam Tel Aviv held in Tel Aviv, Israel.

On 12 November 2022 she won a silver medal at the 2022 European Mixed Team Judo Championships as part of team Netherlands.
