= Seija Ballhaus =

German judoka (born 2000)

Personal information
- Born: 27 July 2000 (age 26)
- Occupation: Judoka

Sport
- Country: Germany
- Sport: Judo
- Weight class: ‍–‍57 kg
- Rank: 2nd dan black belt

Achievements and titles
- World Champ.: 5th (2026)
- European Champ.: (gold) (2025)
- Highest world ranking: 2^{nd}
Medal record
Women's judo
Representing Germany
World Championships
Bronze medal – third place	2025 Budapest	Mixed team
European Games
Silver medal – second place	2023 Kraków	Mixed team
European Championships
Gold medal – first place	2025 Podgorica	‍–‍57 kg
Bronze medal – third place	2022 Mulhouse	Mixed team
Bronze medal – third place	2025 Podgorica	Mixed team
IJF Grand Slam
Gold medal – first place	2024 Abu Dhabi	‍–‍57 kg
Bronze medal – third place	2025 Baku	‍–‍57 kg
Bronze medal – third place	2026 Ulaanbaatar	‍–‍57 kg
Bronze medal – third place	2026 Budapest	‍–‍57 kg
IJF Grand Prix
Gold medal – first place	2025 Linz	‍–‍57 kg
Silver medal – second place	2023 Linz	‍–‍57 kg
Bronze medal – third place	2024 Odivelas	‍–‍57 kg
European U23 Championships
Gold medal – first place	2021 Budapest	‍–‍57 kg
Silver medal – second place	2022 Sarajevo	Mixed team
European Junior Championships
Bronze medal – third place	2017 Maribor	Women's team
Bronze medal – third place	2018 Sofia	Mixed team
Bronze medal – third place	2019 Vantaa	‍–‍57 kg
Bronze medal – third place	2019 Vantaa	Mixed team
World Cadets Championships
Gold medal – first place	2017 Santiago	‍–‍52 kg
European Cadet Championships
Gold medal – first place	2017 Kaunas	Women's team
Bronze medal – third place	2017 Kaunas	‍–‍52 kg

Profile at external databases
- IJF: 22534
- JudoInside.com: 95438
- Updated on 6 October 2026

Seija Ballhaus (born 27 July 2000) is a German judoka. She won gold medals at the 2024 Abu Dhabi Grand Slam and at the 2025 European Championships. Her twin sister, Mascha Ballhaus, is also a judoka.
