= Pleuni Cornelisse =

Dutch judoka (born 1999)

Personal information
- Nationality: Dutch
- Born: 18 October 1999 (age 26) Schagen, Netherlands
- Occupation: Judoka

Sport
- Country: Netherlands
- Sport: Judo
- Weight class: ‍–‍57 kg

Achievements and titles
- European Champ.: R16 (2024)
Medal record
Women's judo
Representing the Netherlands
European Games
Bronze medal – third place	2023 Kraków	Mixed team
European Championships
Silver medal – second place	2022 Mulhouse	Mixed team
IJF Grand Prix
Gold medal – first place	2023 Linz	‍–‍57 kg
Silver medal – second place	2021 Zagreb	‍–‍57 kg
Silver medal – second place	2022 Almada	‍–‍57 kg
European U23 Championships
Gold medal – first place	2020 Poreč	‍–‍57 kg
World Juniors Championships
Bronze medal – third place	2019 Marrakesh	‍–‍57 kg

Profile at external databases
- IJF: 22498
- JudoInside.com: 73241
- Updated on 25 April 2024

Pleuni Cornelisse (born 18 October 1999) is a Dutch judoka. She won a silver at the 2021 Judo Grand Prix Zagreb.

On 12 November 2022 she won a silver medal at the 2022 European Mixed Team Judo Championships as part of team Netherlands.
