= Kwadjo Anani =

Ghanaian judoka (born 1999)

Personal information
- Born: 13 December 1999 (age 26)
- Occupation: Judoka

Sport
- Country: Ghana (until 2021); Italy (since 2022)
- Sport: Judo
- Weight class: ‍–‍90 kg, ‍–‍100 kg, +100 kg

Achievements and titles
- Olympic Games: R32 (2020)
- World Champ.: R64 (2021)
- African Champ.: (silver) (2021)
Medal record
Men's judo
Representing Ghana
African Championships
Silver medal – second place	2021 Dakar	‍–‍90 kg
Representing Italy
Mediterranean Games
Gold medal – first place	2026 Taranto	Mixed team
Silver medal – second place	2026 Taranto	+100 kg

Profile at external databases
- IJF: 51639, 66781
- JudoInside.com: 137284
- Updated on 1 September 2026

Kwadjo Anani (born 13 December 1999) is a Ghanaian judoka.

Anani was born in Brescia, Italy to Ghanaian parents, and has dual Italian and Ghanaian citizenship.

At the 2021 African Judo Championships held in Dakar, Senegal, he won the silver medal in his event.

Anani was selected to compete at the 2020 Summer Games and drawn against Gwak Dong-han in the first round.
