= Joseph Terhec =

French judoka (born 1995)

Personal information
- Born: 5 January 1995 (age 31)
- Occupation: Judoka

Sport
- Country: France
- Sport: Judo
- Weight class: +100 kg

Achievements and titles
- World Champ.: R16 (2022)
- European Champ.: R16 (2022)
Medal record
Men's judo
Representing France
IJF Grand Slam
Bronze medal – third place	2021 Paris	+100 kg
European Junior Championships
Bronze medal – third place	2015 Oberwart	‍–‍100 kg

Profile at external databases
- IJF: 7538
- JudoInside.com: 72257
- Updated on 2 August 2026

Joseph Terhec (born 5 January 1995 in Alençon) is a French judoka in the heavyweight category (+100 kg).
