= 2022 World Judo Championships – Mixed team =

Judo competition

Judo Mixed team at the 2022 World Judo Championships
- Venue: Humo Ice Dome
- Location: Tashkent, Uzbekistan
- Date: 13 October
- Competitors: 178 from 17 nations
- Total prize money: €200,000

Medalists
gold medal	Haruka Funakubo; Kenshi Harada; Soichi Hashimoto; Megumi Horikawa; Kosuke Mashiyama; Saki Niizoe; Hyōga Ōta; Tatsuru Saito; Goki Tajima; Ruri Takahashi; Momo Tamaoki; Wakaba Tomita	Japan
silver medal	Benjamin Axus; Amandine Buchard; Sarah-Léonie Cysique; Romane Dicko; Joan-Benjamin Gaba; Marie-Ève Gahié; Kenny Liveze; Alexis Mathieu; Aleksa Mitrovic; Margaux Pinot; Joseph Terhec; Julia Tolofua	France
bronze medal	Alina Böhm; Miriam Butkereit; Johannes Frey; Alexander Gabler; Sarah Mäkelburg; Dominic Ressel; Jonas Schreiber; Pauline Starke; Eduard Trippel; Anna-Maria Wagner; Igor Wandtke; Jana Ziegler	Germany
bronze medal	Tal Flicker; Maya Goshen; Guy Gurevitch; Raz Hershko; Serafim Kompaniez; Inbar Lanir; Ido Levin; Sagi Muki; Timna Nelson-Levy; Peter Paltchik; Gefen Primo; Gili Sharir	Israel

Champions
- Mixed team: Japan (5th title)

Competition at external databases
- Links: IJF • JudoInside

The mixed team competition at the 2022 World Judo Championships was held on 13 October 2022.

== Results ==
=== Bracket ===
First round
Uzbekistan	4
Austria	2

Round of 16
France	4
Georgia	1
China	4
IJF Refugee Team	0
Brazil	3
South Korea	4
Uzbekistan	2
Israel	4
Japan	4
Dominican Republic	0
Netherlands	4
Kazakhstan	3
Germany	4
Mongolia	2
Ukraine	4
Cuba	3

Quarter-finals
France	4
China	0
South Korea	3
Israel	4
Japan	4
Netherlands	0
Germany	4
Ukraine	0

Semi-finals
France	4
Israel	1
Japan	4
Germany	0

Final
France	2
Japan	4

=== Repechage ===
Repechage
China	4
South Korea	2
Netherlands	4
Ukraine	0

Bronze medal
China	1
Germany	4
Netherlands	2
Israel	4

== Matches ==
=== First round ===
==== Uzbekistan vs Austria ====
Weight Class	Uzbekistan	Result	Austria	Score
Men +90 kg	Bekmurod Oltiboev	01 – 00 (yellow card)	Aaron Fara	1 – 0
Women –57 kg	Shukurjon Aminova	10 (yellow card) – 00	Lisa Grabner	2 – 0
Men –73 kg	Obidkhon Nomonov	00 – 02	Samuel Gaßner	2 – 1
Women –70 kg	Gulnoza Matniyazova	00 – 10	Michaela Polleres	2 – 2
Men –90 kg	Davlat Bobonov	01 – 00 (yellow card)	Wachid Borchashvili	3 – 2
Women +70 kg	Iriskhon Kurbanbaeva	10 – 00	Maria Höllwart	4 – 2

=== Round of 16 ===
==== France vs Georgia ====
Weight Class	France	Result	Georgia	Score
Women –57 kg	Sarah-Léonie Cysique	01 – 00	Eteri Liparteliani	1 – 0
Men –73 kg	Joan-Benjamin Gaba	01 (yellow card) – 00	Giorgi Terashvili	2 – 0
Women –70 kg	Marie-Ève Gahié	02 (yellow card) – 00	Nino Gulbani	3 – 0
Men –90 kg	Aleksa Mitrovic	00 H – 10	Beka Gviniashvili	3 – 1
Women +70 kg	Romane Dicko	10 (yellow card) – 00	Sophio Somkhishvili	4 – 1
Men +90 kg	Joseph Terhec	—	Guram Tushishvili	—

==== China vs International Judo Federation Refugee Team ====
Weight Class	China	Result	IJF	Score
Women –57 kg	Cai Qi	02 – 00 (yellow card)	Muna Dahouk	1 – 0
Men –73 kg	Qing Daga	11 (yellow card) – 00	Ahmad Alikaj	2 – 0
Women –70 kg	Tang Jing	10 – 00	Oula Dahouk	3 – 0
Men –90 kg	Xie Yadong	—	Fares Badawi	3 – 0
Women +70 kg	Su Xin	w/o –	-none Women +70 kg-	4 – 0
Men +90 kg	Li Ruixuan	—	Adnan Khankan	—

==== Brazil vs South Korea ====
Weight Class	Brazil	Result	South Korea	Score
Women –57 kg	Rafaela Silva	00 – 10	Huh Mi-mi	0 – 1
Men –73 kg	Daniel Cargnin	10 (yellow card) – 00 (yellow card)	Lee Eun-kyul	1 – 1
Women –70 kg	Maria Portela	10 – 00	Lee Ju-yeon	2 – 1
Men –90 kg	Rafael Macedo	00 – 10 (yellow card)	Han Ju-yeop	2 – 2
Women +70 kg	Beatriz Souza	00 (yellow card) – 02	Kim Ha-yun	2 – 3
Men +90 kg	Rafael Silva	10 – 00 (yellow card)	Won Jong-hoon	3 – 3
Women –70 kg	Maria Portela	00 (yellow card) – 01	Lee Ju-yeon	3 – 4

==== Uzbekistan vs Israel ====
Weight Class	Uzbekistan	Result	Israel	Score
Women –57 kg	Diyora Keldiyorova	02 (yellow card) – 00 (yellow card)	Timna Nelson-Levy	1 – 0
Men –73 kg	Shakhram Akhadov	02 – 00 (yellow card)	Ido Levin	2 – 0
Women –70 kg	Gulnoza Matniyazova	00 H – 10	Maya Goshen	2 – 1
Men –90 kg	Jaloliddin Kurbonmurodov	00 – 10	Sagi Muki	2 – 2
Women +70 kg	Iriskhon Kurbanbaeva	00 – 10	Raz Hershko	2 – 3
Men +90 kg	Shokhrukhkhon Bakhtiyorov	00 – 01 (yellow card)	Peter Paltchik	2 – 4

==== Japan vs Dominican Republic ====
Weight Class	Japan	Result	Dominican Republic	Score
Women –57 kg	Momo Tamaoki	01 (yellow card) – 00	Ana Rosa García	1 – 0
Men –73 kg	Kenshi Harada	10 – 00	Antonio Tornal	2 – 0
Women –70 kg	Megumi Horikawa	02 – 00 (yellow card)	Ariela Sánchez	3 – 0
Men –90 kg	Goki Tajima	10 (yellow card) – 00 (yellow card)	Robert Florentino	4 – 0
Women +70 kg	Ruri Takahashi	—	Moira Morillo	—
Men +90 kg	Hyōga Ōta	—	José Nova	—

==== Netherlands vs Kazakhstan ====
Weight Class	Netherlands	Result	Kazakhstan	Score
Women –57 kg	Pleuni Cornelisse	00 – 02 (yellow card)	Sevara Nishanbayeva	0 – 1
Men –73 kg	Ivo Verhorstert	11 – 00	Angsarbek Gainullin	1 – 1
Women –70 kg	Hilde Jager	10 – 00	Esmigul Kuyulova	2 – 1
Men –90 kg	Noël van 't End	00 – 10 (yellow card)	Yersultan Muzapparov	2 – 2
Women +70 kg	Marit Kamps	00 – 10	Kamila Berlikash	2 – 3
Men +90 kg	Jur Spijkers	02 (yellow card) – 00	Yerassyl Kazhybayev	3 – 3
Women –70 kg	Hilde Jager	10 – 00	Esmigul Kuyulova	4 – 3

==== Germany vs Mongolia ====
Weight Class	Germany	Result	Mongolia	Score
Women –57 kg	Pauline Starke	01 – 11 (yellow card)	Lkhagvatogoogiin Enkhriilen	0 – 1
Men –73 kg	Igor Wandtke	00 – 10 (yellow card)	Tsend-Ochiryn Tsogtbaatar	0 – 2
Women –70 kg	Miriam Butkereit	10 – 00	Boldyn Gankhaich	1 – 2
Men –90 kg	Eduard Trippel	01 – 00 (yellow card)	Gantulgyn Altanbagana	2 – 2
Women +70 kg	Anna-Maria Wagner	02 – 00	Amarsaikhany Adiyaasüren	3 – 2
Men +90 kg	Johannes Frey	10 (yellow card) – 00 (yellow card)	Odkhüügiin Tsetsentsengel	4 – 2

==== Ukraine vs Cuba ====
Weight Class	Ukraine	Result	Cuba	Score
Women –57 kg	Daria Bilodid	01 – 00	Arnaes Odelín	1 – 0
Men –73 kg	Artem Khomula	00 – 10 (yellow card)	Magdiel Estrada	1 – 1
Women –70 kg	Nataliia Chystiakova	00 – 11	Maylín del Toro Carvajal	1 – 2
Men –90 kg	Stanislav Gunchenko	01 (yellow card) – 00	Iván Felipe Silva Morales	2 – 2
Women +70 kg	Yelyzaveta Lytvynenko	00 – 10 (yellow card)	Idalys Ortiz	2 – 3
Men +90 kg	Iakiv Khammo	02 – 00 (yellow card)	Andy Granda	3 – 3
Men +90 kg	Iakiv Khammo	10 – 00	Andy Granda	4 – 3

=== Quarter-finals ===
==== France vs China ====
Weight Class	France	Result	China	Score
Men –73 kg	Joan-Benjamin Gaba	10 – 00	Gou Junlong	1 – 0
Women –70 kg	Marie-Ève Gahié	01 – 00 (yellow card)	Sun Anqi	2 – 0
Men –90 kg	Aleksa Mitrovic	10 – 00	Han Qi	3 – 0
Women +70 kg	Romane Dicko	10 – 00	Su Xin	4 – 0
Men +90 kg	Joseph Terhec	—	Li Ruihao	—
Women –57 kg	Sarah-Léonie Cysique	—	Cai Qi	—

==== South Korea vs Israel ====
Weight Class	South Korea	Result	Israel	Score
Men –73 kg	Lee Eun-kyul	10 – 00	Ido Levin	1 – 0
Women –70 kg	Lee Ju-yeon	00 – 10	Maya Goshen	1 – 1
Men –90 kg	Lee Joon-hwan	00 – 11	Sagi Muki	1 – 2
Women +70 kg	Kim Ha-yun	10 – 00	Raz Hershko	2 – 2
Men +90 kg	Han Ju-yeop	00 – 10	Peter Paltchik	2 – 3
Women –57 kg	Huh Mi-mi	01 (yellow card) – 00	Timna Nelson-Levy	3 – 3
Women +70 kg	Kim Ha-yun	00 – 01	Raz Hershko	3 – 4

==== Japan vs Netherlands ====
Weight Class	Japan	Result	Netherlands	Score
Men –73 kg	Kenshi Harada	10 – 00 (yellow card)	Ivo Verhorstert	1 – 0
Women –70 kg	Saki Niizoe	02 – 00	Hilde Jager	2 – 0
Men –90 kg	Goki Tajima	10 – 00	Frank de Wit	3 – 0
Women +70 kg	Ruri Takahashi	10 – 00	Marit Kamps	4 – 0
Men +90 kg	Hyōga Ōta	—	Jur Spijkers	—
Women –57 kg	Momo Tamaoki	—	Pleuni Cornelisse	—

==== Germany vs Ukraine ====
Weight Class	Germany	Result	Ukraine	Score
Men –73 kg	Igor Wandtke	11 (yellow card) – 00 (yellow card)	Artem Khomula	1 – 0
Women –70 kg	Miriam Butkereit	11 (yellow card) – 00	Anastasiia Antipina	2 – 0
Men –90 kg	Eduard Trippel	10 – 00	Stanislav Gunchenko	3 – 0
Women +70 kg	Anna-Maria Wagner	10 (yellow card) – 00	Yelyzaveta Lytvynenko	4 – 0
Men +90 kg	Johannes Frey	—	Iakiv Khammo	—
Women –57 kg	Pauline Starke	—	Daria Bilodid	—

=== Semifinals ===
==== France vs Israel ====
Weight Class	France	Result	Israel	Score
Women –70 kg	Marie-Ève Gahié	02 – 00	Maya Goshen	1 – 0
Men –90 kg	Alexis Mathieu	10 – 00 (yellow card)	Sagi Muki	2 – 0
Women +70 kg	Romane Dicko	02 – 00	Raz Hershko	3 – 0
Men +90 kg	Joseph Terhec	00 – 01	Peter Paltchik	3 – 1
Women –57 kg	Sarah-Léonie Cysique	10 – 01	Timna Nelson-Levy	4 – 1
Men –73 kg	Joan-Benjamin Gaba	—	Tal Flicker	—

==== Japan vs Germany ====
Weight Class	Japan	Result	Germany	Score
Women –70 kg	Saki Niizoe	10 – 00	Sarah Mäkelburg	1 – 0
Men –90 kg	Kosuke Mashiyama	01 – 00	Eduard Trippel	2 – 0
Women +70 kg	Wakaba Tomita	10 – 00	Alina Böhm	3 – 0
Men +90 kg	Hyōga Ōta	02 (yellow card) – 00	Johannes Frey	4 – 0
Women –57 kg	Haruka Funakubo	—	Pauline Starke	—
Men –73 kg	Kenshi Harada	—	Alexander Gabler	—

=== Repechage ===
==== China vs South Korea ====
Weight Class	China	Result	South Korea	Score
Women –70 kg	Tang Jing	02 (yellow card) – 00 (yellow card)	Lee Ju-yeon	1 – 0
Men –90 kg	Xie Yadong	00 – 10	Han Ju-yeop	1 – 1
Women +70 kg	Xu Shiyan	02 (yellow card) – 00 (yellow card)	Kim Ha-yun	2 – 1
Men +90 kg	Li Ruixuan	w/o –	-none Men +90 kg-	3 – 1
Women –57 kg	Zhao Lile	00 – 02	Huh Mi-mi	3 – 2
Men –73 kg	Qing Daga	02 (yellow card) – 00 (yellow card)	Lee Eun-kyul	4 – 2

==== Netherlands vs Ukraine ====
Weight Class	Netherlands	Result	Ukraine	Score
Women –70 kg	Sanne Vermeer	11 – 00	Anastasiia Antipina	1 – 0
Men –90 kg	Frank de Wit	w/o –	-none Men -90 kg-	2 – 0
Women +70 kg	Guusje Steenhuis	10 – 00 H	Yelyzaveta Lytvynenko	3 – 0
Men +90 kg	Michael Korrel	01 – 00	Iakiv Khammo	4 – 0
Women –57 kg	Pleuni Cornelisse	—	Daria Bilodid	—
Men –73 kg	Ivo Verhorstert	—	Artem Khomula	—

=== Third place ===
==== China vs Germany ====
Weight Class	China	Result	Germany	Score
Men –90 kg	Xie Yadong	00 – 11	Eduard Trippel	0 – 1
Women +70 kg	Xu Shiyan	01 – 00	Anna-Maria Wagner	1 – 1
Men +90 kg	Li Ruixuan	00 (yellow card) – 02 (yellow card)	Johannes Frey	1 – 2
Women –57 kg	Cai Qi	00 (yellow card) – 01 (yellow card)	Pauline Starke	1 – 3
Men –73 kg	Qing Daga	00 – 01	Igor Wandtke	1 – 4
Women –70 kg	Tang Jing	—	Miriam Butkereit	—

==== Netherlands vs Israel ====
Weight Class	Netherlands	Result	Israel	Score
Men –90 kg	Frank de Wit	10 – 00	Guy Gurevitch	1 – 0
Women +70 kg	Guusje Steenhuis	00 – 02	Raz Hershko	1 – 1
Men +90 kg	Michael Korrel	01 – 00	Peter Paltchik	2 – 1
Women –57 kg	Pleuni Cornelisse	00 (yellow card) – 11 (yellow card)	Timna Nelson-Levy	2 – 2
Men –73 kg	Ivo Verhorstert	00 – 10	Ido Levin	2 – 3
Women –70 kg	Sanne Vermeer	00 – 10	Maya Goshen	2 – 4

=== Final – France vs Japan ===
Weight Class	France	Result	Japan	Score
Men –90 kg	Alexis Mathieu	00 – 11 (yellow card)	Goki Tajima	0 – 1
Women +70 kg	Romane Dicko	02 – 00	Wakaba Tomita	1 – 1
Men +90 kg	Joseph Terhec	00 – 02	Hyōga Ōta	1 – 2
Women –57 kg	Sarah-Léonie Cysique	02 – 00	Haruka Funakubo	2 – 2
Men –73 kg	Joan-Benjamin Gaba	00 – 10	Kenshi Harada	2 – 3
Women –70 kg	Marie-Ève Gahié	00 (yellow card) – 10	Saki Niizoe	2 – 4

== Prize money ==
The sums listed bring the total prizes awarded to 200,000€ for the event.

Medal	Total	Judoka	Coach
Gold	90,000€	72,000€	18,000€
Silver	60,000€	48,000€	12,000€
Bronze	25,000€	20,000€	5,000€
