= 2022 World Judo Championships – Women's +78 kg =

Judo competition

Judo Women's +78 kg at the 2022 World Judo Championships
- Venue: Humo Ice Dome
- Location: Tashkent, Uzbekistan
- Date: 12 October
- Competitors: 29 from 25 nations
- Total prize money: €57,000

Medalists
gold medal	Romane Dicko (1st title)	France
silver medal	Beatriz Souza	Brazil
bronze medal	Wakaba Tomita	Japan
bronze medal	Julia Tolofua	France

Competition at external databases
- Links: IJF • JudoInside

The Women's +78 kg event at the 2022 World Judo Championships was held at the Humo Ice Dome arena in Tashkent, Uzbekistan on 12 October 2022.

== Results ==
=== Finals ===
Semi-finals
(France) Romane Dicko	10
(France) Julia Tolofua	00
(Japan) Wakaba Tomita	00
(Brazil) Beatriz Souza	10

Final
(France) Romane Dicko	10
(Brazil) Beatriz Souza	00

=== Repechage ===
Repechage
(Netherlands) Marit Kamps	00
(South Korea) Kim Ha-yun	10
(Israel) Raz Hershko	10
(Cuba) Idalys Ortiz	00

Bronze medal
(South Korea) Kim Ha-yun	00
(Japan) Wakaba Tomita	10
(Israel) Raz Hershko	00
(France) Julia Tolofua	10

=== Pool A ===
First round
(China) Su Xin	10
(United States) Nina Cutro-Kelly	00
(Netherlands) Marit Kamps	10
(Kazakhstan) Kamila Berlikash	00
(Chinese Taipei) Tsai Jia-wen	00
(Dominican Republic) Moira Morillo	10

Round of 16
(France) Romane Dicko	10
(China) Su Xin	01
(Netherlands) Marit Kamps	10
(Dominican Republic) Moira Morillo	00

Quarter-finals
(France) Romane Dicko	10
(Netherlands) Marit Kamps	00

=== Pool B ===
First round
(France) Julia Tolofua	10
(Serbia) Milica Žabić	00
(Portugal) Rochele Nunes	10
(Czech Republic) Markéta Paulusová	00
(Tunisia) Nihel Cheikh Rouhou	00
(Turkey) Kayra Sayit	10
(Croatia) Ivana Maranić	00
(South Korea) Kim Ha-yun	11

Round of 16
(France) Julia Tolofua	10
(Portugal) Rochele Nunes	01
(Turkey) Kayra Sayit	00
(South Korea) Kim Ha-yun	10

Quarter-finals
(France) Julia Tolofua	10
(South Korea) Kim Ha-yun	00

=== Pool C ===
First round
(Turkey) Sebile Akbulut	10
(Senegal) Monica Sagna	00
(Japan) Wakaba Tomita	10
(Poland) Kinga Wolszczak	00
(Croatia) ~~Tina Radić~~	00
(India) Tulika Maan	w/o

Round of 16
(Israel) Raz Hershko	10
(Turkey) Sebile Akbulut	00
(Japan) Wakaba Tomita	10
(India) Tulika Maan	00

Quarter-finals
(Israel) Raz Hershko	00
(Japan) Wakaba Tomita	10

=== Pool D ===
First round
(Bosnia and Herzegovina) Larisa Cerić	01
(China) Xu Shiyan	00
(Cuba) Idalys Ortiz	10
(Georgia (country)) Sophio Somkhishvili	00
(Mongolia) Amarsaikhany Adiyaasüren	10
(Lithuania) Sandra Jablonskytė	01

Round of 16
(Brazil) Beatriz Souza	10
(Bosnia and Herzegovina) Larisa Cerić	00
(Cuba) Idalys Ortiz	10
(Mongolia) Amarsaikhany Adiyaasüren	00

Quarter-finals
(Brazil) Beatriz Souza	10
(Cuba) Idalys Ortiz	00
