= 2021 World Judo Championships – Women's +78 kg =

Judo competition

Judo Women's +78 kg at the 2021 World Judo Championships
- Venue: László Papp Budapest Sports Arena
- Location: Budapest, Hungary
- Date: 12 June
- Competitors: 40 from 33 nations
- Total prize money: 57,000€

Medalists
gold medal	Sarah Asahina (2nd title)	Japan
silver medal	Wakaba Tomita	Japan
bronze medal	Beatriz Souza	Brazil
bronze medal	Maria Suelen Altheman	Brazil

Competition at external databases
- Links: IJF • JudoInside

The Women's +78 kg competition at the 2021 World Judo Championships was held on 12 June 2021.

== Results ==
=== Finals ===
Semi-finals
(Cuba) Idalys Ortiz	00
(Japan) Sarah Asahina	01
(Japan) Wakaba Tomita	10
(Brazil) Beatriz Souza	00

Final
(Japan) Sarah Asahina	10
(Japan) Wakaba Tomita	00

=== Repechage ===
Repechage
(France) Julia Tolofua	10
(Puerto Rico) Melissa Mojica	00

Third place
(France) Julia Tolofua	00
(Brazil) Beatriz Souza	10

Repechage
(Brazil) Maria Suelen Altheman	10
(Tunisia) Nihel Cheikh Rouhou	00

Third place
(Brazil) Maria Suelen Altheman	10
(Cuba) Idalys Ortiz	00

=== Pool A ===
First round
(Mongolia) Amarsaikhany Adiyaasüren	00
Anzhela Gasparian	10
(Serbia) Milica Žabić	00
(Germany) Jasmin Grabowski	10

Second round
(Cuba) Idalys Ortiz	10
(Poland) Paula Kułaga	00
(Trinidad and Tobago) Gabriella Wood	00
Anzhela Gasparian	10
(Bosnia and Herzegovina) Larisa Cerić	01
(France) Julia Tolofua	10
(Kazakhstan) Nazgul Maratova	00
(Germany) Jasmin Grabowski	11

Third round
(Cuba) Idalys Ortiz	10
Anzhela Gasparian	00
(France) Julia Tolofua	10
(Germany) Jasmin Grabowski	00

Quarterfinals
(Cuba) Idalys Ortiz	10
(France) Julia Tolofua	00

=== Pool B ===
First round
(United Kingdom) Sarah Adlington	00
(Spain) Sara Álvarez	10
(Uzbekistan) Rinata Ilmatova	10
(United States) Nina Cutro-Kelly	01

Second round
(Belarus) Maryna Slutskaya	10
(Spain) Sara Álvarez	00
(Puerto Rico) Melissa Mojica	10
(Ukraine) Vasylyna Kyrychenko	00
(Japan) Sarah Asahina	10
(Uzbekistan) Rinata Ilmatova	00
(Saudi Arabia) Tahani Al-Qahtani	00
(Slovenia) Anamari Velenšek	10

Third round
(Belarus) Maryna Slutskaya	00
(Puerto Rico) Melissa Mojica	10
(Japan) Sarah Asahina	10
(Slovenia) Anamari Velenšek	00

Quarterfinals
(Puerto Rico) Melissa Mojica	00
(Japan) Sarah Asahina	10

=== Pool C ===
First round
(Bosnia and Herzegovina) Borjana Marjanac	00
(Hungary) Mercédesz Szigetvár	10
(Japan) Wakaba Tomita	11
(Lithuania) Sandra Jablonskytė	00

Second round
(Brazil) Maria Suelen Altheman	10
(Ukraine) Yelyzaveta Kalanina	00
(Algeria) Sonia Asselah	00
(Hungary) Mercédesz Szigetvár	10
(Portugal) Rochele Nunes	00
(Japan) Wakaba Tomita	01
(Saudi Arabia) Maryan Ibrahim	00
(Togo) Essohanam Koro	10

Third round
(Brazil) Maria Suelen Altheman	01
(Hungary) Mercédesz Szigetvár	00
(Japan) Wakaba Tomita	10
(Togo) Essohanam Koro	00

Quarterfinals
(Brazil) Maria Suelen Altheman	00
(Japan) Wakaba Tomita	10

=== Pool D ===
First round
(Kazakhstan) Kamila Berlikash	00
(Croatia) Ivana Marinić	10
(Georgia (country)) Sophio Somkhishvili	00
(South Korea) Kim Ha-yun	10

Second round
(Brazil) Beatriz Souza	01
(France) Léa Fontaine	00
(Croatia) Ivana Marinić	10
(Nicaragua) Izayana Marenco	00
(Tunisia) Nihel Cheikh Rouhou	10
(South Korea) Kim Ha-yun	00
(Peru) Yuliana Bolívar	00
(Cameroon) Hortence Mballa	10

Third round
(Brazil) Beatriz Souza	11
(Croatia) Ivana Marinić	00
(Tunisia) Nihel Cheikh Rouhou	01
(Cameroon) Hortence Mballa	00

Quarterfinals
(Brazil) Beatriz Souza	11
(Tunisia) Nihel Cheikh Rouhou	00

== Prize money ==
The sums listed bring the total prizes awarded to 57,000€ for the individual event.

Medal	Total	Judoka	Coach
Gold	26,000€	20,800€	5,200€
Silver	15,000€	12,000€	3,000€
Bronze	8,000€	6,400€	1,600€
