= 2025 World Judo Championships – Women's +78 kg =

Judo competition

Judo Women's +78 kg at the 2025 World Judo Championships
- Venue: László Papp Budapest Sports Arena
- Location: Budapest, Hungary
- Date: 19 June 2025
- Competitors: 32 from 25 nations
- Total prize money: €57,000

Medalists
gold medal	Kim Ha-yun (1st title)	South Korea
silver medal	Mao Arai	Japan
bronze medal	Lee Hyeon-ji	South Korea
bronze medal	Romane Dicko	France

Competition at external databases
- Links: IJF • JudoInside

The 2025 World Judo Championships was held at the László Papp Budapest Sports Arena in Budapest, Hungary on 19 June 2025.

== Results ==
=== Finals ===
Semi-finals
(France) Romane Dicko	000
(South Korea) Kim Ha-yun	100 (yellow card)
(Japan) Mao Arai	100 (yellow card)
(Netherlands) Marit Kamps	000

Final
(South Korea) Kim Ha-yun	100
(Japan) Mao Arai	000

=== Repechage ===
Repechage
(Netherlands) Karen Stevenson	000
(South Korea) Lee Hyeon-ji	100
(Croatia) Helena Vuković	001
(Estonia) Emma-Melis Aktas	100

Bronze medal
(South Korea) Lee Hyeon-ji	100
(Netherlands) Marit Kamps	000 (yellow card)
(Estonia) Emma-Melis Aktas	000
(France) Romane Dicko	011 (yellow card)

=== Pool A ===
First round
(France) Romane Dicko	020
(Italy) Asya Tavano	000
(China) Ayiman Jinesinuer	020
(Lithuania) Rugilė Stasiulytė	000 (yellow card)
(Turkey) Hilal Öztürk	020
(Moldova) Oxana Diacenco	000
(Netherlands) Karen Stevenson	100
(Mongolia) Amarsaikhany Adiyaasüren	000

Round of 16
(France) Romane Dicko	100
(China) Ayiman Jinesinuer	000
(Turkey) Hilal Öztürk	001
(Netherlands) Karen Stevenson	002 (yellow card)

Quarter-finals
(France) Romane Dicko	100
(Netherlands) Karen Stevenson	000 (yellow card)

=== Pool B ===
First round
(South Korea) Kim Ha-yun	101
(India) Tulika Maan	000
(International Judo Federation) Elis Startseva	001
(Japan) Ruri Takahashi	010
(South Korea) Lee Hyeon-ji	100
(Croatia) Tina Radić	000
(Georgia (country)) Sophio Somkhishvili	021
(Colombia) Brigitte Carabalí	000

Round of 16
(South Korea) Kim Ha-yun	100 (yellow card)
(Japan) Ruri Takahashi	000
(South Korea) Lee Hyeon-ji	100 (yellow card)
(Georgia (country)) Sophio Somkhishvili	000

Quarter-finals
(South Korea) Kim Ha-yun	100
(South Korea) Lee Hyeon-ji	000

=== Pool C ===
First round
(Brazil) Beatriz Souza	010
(Angola) Crislayn Rodrigues	000
(Croatia) Helena Vuković	001
(New Zealand) Sydnee Andrews	000
(Japan) Mao Arai	100 (yellow card)
(Cuba) Dayanara Curbelo	000
(Uzbekistan) Iriskhon Kurbanbaeva	100
(Italy) Erica Simonetti	000

Round of 16
(Brazil) Beatriz Souza	000
(Croatia) Helena Vuković	100
(Japan) Mao Arai	100 (yellow card)
(Uzbekistan) Iriskhon Kurbanbaeva	000 (yellow card)

Quarter-finals
(Croatia) Helena Vuković	000
(Japan) Mao Arai	100 (yellow card)

=== Pool D ===
First round
~~(Israel) Raz Hershko~~
(Nicaragua) Izayana Marenco	w/o
(Estonia) Emma-Melis Aktas	010 (yellow card)
(Tunisia) Siwar Dhawedi	000
(Netherlands) Marit Kamps	001
(International Judo Federation) Mariia Ivanova	000 (yellow card)
(China) Niu Xinran	000
(Serbia) Milica Žabić	020

Round of 16
(Nicaragua) Izayana Marenco	000 (yellow card)
(Estonia) Emma-Melis Aktas	020
(Netherlands) Marit Kamps	020 (yellow card)
(Serbia) Milica Žabić	000

Quarter-finals
(Estonia) Emma-Melis Aktas	000
(Netherlands) Marit Kamps	100

== Prize money ==
The sums listed bring the total prizes awarded to €57,000 for the individual event.

Medal	Total	Judoka	Coach
Gold	€26,000	€20,800	€5,200
Silver	€15,000	€12,000	€3,000
Bronze	€8,000	€6,400	€1,600
