= 2024 World Judo Championships – Women's +78 kg =

Judo competition

Judo Women's +78 kg at the 2024 World Judo Championships
- Venue: Mubadala Arena
- Location: Abu Dhabi, United Arab Emirates
- Date: 23 May 2024
- Competitors: 40 from 32 nations
- Total prize money: €57,000

Medalists
gold medal	Wakaba Tomita (1st title)	Japan
silver medal	Kayra Ozdemir	Turkey
bronze medal	Kim Ha-yun	South Korea
bronze medal	Hilal Öztürk	Turkey

Competition at external databases
- Links: IJF • JudoInside

The Women's +78 kg event at the 2024 World Judo Championships was held at the Mubadala Arena in Abu Dhabi, United Arab Emirates on 23 May 2024.

== Results ==
=== Finals ===
Semi-finals
(Turkey) Hilal Öztürk	00 (yellow card)
(Japan) Wakaba Tomita	11
(Turkey) Kayra Ozdemir	10 (yellow card)
(Italy) Asya Tavano	00

Final
(Japan) Wakaba Tomita	02 (yellow card)
(Turkey) Kayra Ozdemir	00 (yellow card)

=== Repechage ===
Repechage
(France) Léa Fontaine	00
(South Korea) Kim Ha-yun	02
(China) Xu Shiyan	11
(Netherlands) Karen Stevenson	01

Bronze medal
(South Korea) Kim Ha-yun	01 (yellow card)
(Italy) Asya Tavano	00
(China) Xu Shiyan	00
(Turkey) Hilal Öztürk	01

=== Pool A ===
First round
(Senegal) Monica Sagna	00
(Dominican Republic) Moira Morillo	10
(Croatia) Ivana Šutalo	10
(Poland) Kinga Wolszczak	01

Round of 32
(China) Su Xin	11
(Dominican Republic) Moira Morillo	00
(Turkey) Hilal Öztürk	01
(Austria) Maria Höllwart	00 (yellow card)
(France) Léa Fontaine	10
(Uzbekistan) Rinata Ilmatova	00
(Croatia) Ivana Šutalo	10
(Cameroon) Richelle Anita Soppi Mbella	00

Round of 16
(China) Su Xin	00
(Turkey) Hilal Öztürk	10
(France) Léa Fontaine	02 (yellow card)
(Croatia) Ivana Šutalo	00 (yellow card)

Quarter-finals
(Turkey) Hilal Öztürk	01 (yellow card)
(France) Léa Fontaine	00

=== Pool B ===
First round
(Netherlands) Marit Kamps	10 (yellow card)
(Serbia) Milica Žabić	00
(Mongolia) Amarsaikhany Adiyaasüren	00
(Japan) Wakaba Tomita	10

Round of 32
(South Korea) Kim Ha-yun	10
(Venezuela) Amarantha Urdaneta	00
(Netherlands) Marit Kamps	w/o
(Nicaragua) Izayana Marenco
(Portugal) Rochele Nunes	00 (yellow card)
(Japan) Wakaba Tomita	02 (yellow card)
(India) Tulika Maan	02
(Canada) Ana Laura Portuondo Isasi	01

Round of 16
(South Korea) Kim Ha-yun	02
(Netherlands) Marit Kamps	00
(Japan) Wakaba Tomita	02
(India) Tulika Maan	00

Quarter-finals
(South Korea) Kim Ha-yun	00
(Japan) Wakaba Tomita	11

=== Pool C ===
First round
(Saudi Arabia) Tahani Alqahtani	00
(Kazakhstan) Kamila Berlikash	10
(India) Kanwarpreet Kaur	00
(New Zealand) Sydnee Andrews	10

Round of 32
(China) Xu Shiyan	10 (yellow card)
(Kazakhstan) Kamila Berlikash	00 (yellow card)
(Japan) Mao Arai	02
(Croatia) Helena Vuković	00
(Turkey) Kayra Ozdemir	10 (yellow card)
(New Zealand) Sydnee Andrews	00
(Germany) Samira Bouizgarne	00
(Cuba) Idalys Ortiz	01 (yellow card)

Round of 16
(China) Xu Shiyan	01
(Japan) Mao Arai	00
(Turkey) Kayra Ozdemir	10
(Cuba) Idalys Ortiz	00

Quarter-finals
(China) Xu Shiyan	00
(Turkey) Kayra Ozdemir	01

=== Pool D ===
First round
(Poland) Urszula Hofman	10 (yellow card)
(Moldova) Oxana Diacenco	00
(Bosnia and Herzegovina) Larisa Cerić	02 (yellow card)
(Georgia (country)) Sophio Somkhishvili	01

Round of 32
(Brazil) Beatriz Souza	10
(South Korea) Lee Hyeon-ji	00
(Poland) Urszula Hofman	00
(Netherlands) Karen Stevenson	10 (yellow card)
(Italy) Asya Tavano	02
(Lithuania) Sandra Jablonskytė	00 (yellow card)
(Bosnia and Herzegovina) Larisa Cerić	01 (yellow card)
(Tunisia) Sarra Mzougui	02

Round of 16
(Brazil) Beatriz Souza	00
(Netherlands) Karen Stevenson	11
(Italy) Asya Tavano	10 (yellow card)
(Tunisia) Sarra Mzougui	00

Quarter-finals
(Netherlands) Karen Stevenson	00
(Italy) Asya Tavano	11

== Prize money ==
The sums listed bring the total prizes awarded to €57,000 for the individual event.

Medal	Total	Judoka	Coach
Gold	€26,000	€20,800	€5,200
Silver	€15,000	€12,000	€3,000
Bronze	€8,000	€6,400	€1,600
