= 2023 World Judo Championships – Women's +78 kg =

Judo competition

Judo Women's +78 kg at the 2023 World Judo Championships
- Venue: Ali Bin Hamad Al Attiya Arena
- Location: Doha, Qatar
- Date: 13 May 2023
- Competitors: 41 from 34 nations
- Total prize money: €57,000

Medalists
gold medal	Akira Sone (2nd title)	Japan
silver medal	Julia Tolofua	France
bronze medal	Beatriz Souza	Brazil
bronze medal	Raz Hershko	Israel

Competition at external databases
- Links: IJF • JudoInside

The Women's +78 kg event at the 2023 World Judo Championships was held at the Ali Bin Hamad al-Attiyah Arena in Doha, Qatar on 13 May 2023.

== Results ==
=== Finals ===
Semi-finals
(China) Xu Shiyan	00
(France) Julia Tolofua	01
(Japan) Akira Sone	01
(South Korea) Kim Ha-yun	00

Final
(France) Julia Tolofua	00
(Japan) Akira Sone	10

=== Repechage ===
Repechage
(Italy) Asya Tavano	00
(Brazil) Beatriz Souza	10
(Israel) Raz Hershko	10
(Turkey) Kayra Sayit	00

Bronze medal
(Brazil) Beatriz Souza	10
(South Korea) Kim Ha-yun	00
(Israel) Raz Hershko	01
(China) Xu Shiyan	00

=== Pool A ===
First round
(Chinese Taipei) Tsai Jia-wen	00
(Italy) Asya Tavano	10
(Croatia) Tina Radić	10
(Algeria) Sonia Asselah	01

Round of 32
(France) Romane Dicko	00
(Italy) Asya Tavano	01
(Kazakhstan) Kamila Berlikash	10
(Angola) Crislayn Rodrigues	00
(China) Xu Shiyan	11
(Croatia) Tina Radić	00
(Moldova) Oxana Diacenco	00
(Mongolia) Amarsaikhany Adiyaasüren	02

Round of 16
(Italy) Asya Tavano	10
(Kazakhstan) Kamila Berlikash	00
(China) Xu Shiyan	01
(Mongolia) Amarsaikhany Adiyaasüren	00

Quarter-finals
(Italy) Asya Tavano	00
(China) Xu Shiyan	11

=== Pool B ===
First round
(Madagascar) Haingoniaina Durianah Ramiandrisoa	00
(South Korea) Park Saet-byeol	10
(New Zealand) Sydnee Andrews	00
(Serbia) Milica Žabić	02
(Bosnia and Herzegovina) Larisa Cerić	00
(Turkey) Hilal Öztürk	02

Round of 32
(Brazil) Beatriz Souza	10
(South Korea) Park Saet-byeol	00
(Serbia) Milica Žabić	01
Daria Vladimirova	00
(France) Julia Tolofua	10
(Venezuela) Amarantha Urdaneta	00
(Turkey) Hilal Öztürk	00
(Netherlands) Marit Kamps	10

Round of 16
(Brazil) Beatriz Souza	10
(Serbia) Milica Žabić	00
(France) Julia Tolofua	02
(Netherlands) Marit Kamps	00

Quarter-finals
(Brazil) Beatriz Souza	00
(France) Julia Tolofua	10

=== Pool C ===
First round
(United States) Mackenzie Williams	w/o
~~Mahboubeh Barbari Zharfi~~
(India) Tulika Maan	00
(Kazakhstan) Akerke Ramazanova	11

Round of 32
(Israel) Raz Hershko	10
(Zimbabwe) Christi-Rose Pretorius	00
(United States) Mackenzie Williams	00
(China) Su Xin	10
(Japan) Akira Sone	10
(Kazakhstan) Akerke Ramazanova	00
(Uzbekistan) Rinata Ilmatova	00
(Tunisia) Sarra Mzougui	10

Round of 16
(Israel) Raz Hershko	10
(China) Su Xin	00
(Japan) Akira Sone	02
(Tunisia) Sarra Mzougui	00

Quarter-finals
(Israel) Raz Hershko	00
(Japan) Akira Sone	10

=== Pool D ===
First round
(Senegal) Monica Sagna	00
(Lithuania) Sandra Jablonskytė	10
(Poland) Kinga Wolszczak	02
(Chinese Taipei) Chang Ling-fang	00

Round of 32
(South Korea) Kim Ha-yun	10
(Lithuania) Sandra Jablonskytė	00
(Colombia) Brigitte Carabalí	00
(Netherlands) Karen Stevenson	10
(Turkey) Kayra Sayit	w/o
~~(Cuba) Idalys Ortiz~~
(Poland) Kinga Wolszczak	01
(Georgia (country)) Sophio Somkhishvili	02

Round of 16
(South Korea) Kim Ha-yun	10
(Netherlands) Karen Stevenson	00
(Turkey) Kayra Sayit	10
(Georgia (country)) Sophio Somkhishvili	00

Quarter-finals
(South Korea) Kim Ha-yun	10
(Turkey) Kayra Sayit	00

== Prize money ==
The sums listed bring the total prizes awarded to €57,000 for the individual event.

Medal	Total	Judoka	Coach
Gold	€26,000	€20,800	€5,200
Silver	€15,000	€12,000	€3,000
Bronze	€8,000	€6,400	€1,600
