= Judo at the 2022 Asian Games – Women's +78 kg =

Judo competition

Judo Women's +78 kg at the 2022 Asian Games
- Venue: Xiaoshan Linpu Gymnasium
- Location: Hangzhou, China
- Dates: 26 September 2023
- Nations: 11

Medalists
gold medal	Kim Ha-yun	South Korea
silver medal	Xu Shiyan	China
bronze medal	Wakaba Tomita	Japan
bronze medal	Amarsaikhany Adiyaasüren	Mongolia

Competition at external databases
- Links: IJF • JudoInside

The women's +78 kilograms (half lightweight) competition in Judo at the 2022 Asian Games in Hangzhou was held on 26 September 2023 at the Xiaoshan Linpu Gymnasium.

== Schedule ==
All times are China Standard Time (UTC+08:00)

Date	Time	Event
Tuesday, 26 September 2023	10:00	Elimination round of 16
Tuesday, 26 September 2023	10:00	Quarterfinals
Tuesday, 26 September 2023	10:00	Repechage
Tuesday, 26 September 2023	10:00	Semifinals
Tuesday, 26 September 2023	16:00	Finals

== Results ==
=== Main bracket ===
Round of 16
Rinata Ilmatova (UZB)	10
Aakriti Joshi (NEP)	00
Tsai Jia-wen (TPE)	10
Thonthan Satjadet (THA)	00 (yellow card)
Tulika Maan (IND)	10
Lai Qing Lam (MAC)	00

Quarter-finals
Kim Ha-yun (KOR)	10
Rinata Ilmatova (UZB)	00 (yellow card)
Amarsaikhany Adiyaasüren (MGL)	01
Kamila Berlikash (KAZ)	00
Xu Shiyan (CHN)	10
Tsai Jia-wen (TPE)	00
Wakaba Tomita (JPN)	10
Tulika Maan (IND)	00

Semi-finals
Kim Ha-yun (KOR)	10
Amarsaikhany Adiyaasüren (MGL)	00
Xu Shiyan (CHN)	10
Wakaba Tomita (JPN)	01

Gold medal contest
Kim Ha-yun (KOR)	01 (yellow card)
Xu Shiyan (CHN)	00 (yellow card)

=== Repechage ===
Repechage
Rinata Ilmatova (UZB)	00 (yellow card)
Kamila Berlikash (KAZ)	10
Tsai Jia-wen (TPE)	00
Tulika Maan (IND)	10

Bronze medal contests
Kamila Berlikash (KAZ)	00
Wakaba Tomita (JPN)	10
Tulika Maan (IND)	00
Amarsaikhany Adiyaasüren (MGL)	10
