= Judo at the 2022 Asian Games =

Judo competition

Judo Judo at the 2022 Asian Games
- Venue: Xiaoshan Linpu Gymnasium
- Location: Hangzhou, China
- Dates: 24–27 September 2023
- Competitors: 227 from 33 nations

Competition at external databases
- Links: IJF • JudoInside

Judo events at the 2022 Asian Games were held at the Xiaoshan Linpu Gymnasium in Hangzhou, China from 24 to 27 September 2023.

== Schedule ==
P	Preliminary rounds & Repechage	F	Finals

Event↓/Date →	24th Sun		25th Mon		26th Tue		27th Wed	
Men's 60 kg	P	F						
Men's 66 kg	P	F						
Men's 73 kg			P	F				
Men's 81 kg			P	F				
Men's 90 kg					P	F		
Men's 100 kg					P	F		
Men's +100 kg					P	F		
Women's 48 kg	P	F						
Women's 52 kg	P	F						
Women's 57 kg			P	F				
Women's 63 kg			P	F				
Women's 70 kg			P	F				
Women's 78 kg					P	F		
Women's +78 kg					P	F		
Mixed team							P	F

== Medal summary ==
=== Men's events ===
Event	Gold	Silver	Bronze
Extra-lightweight (−60 kg)	Yang Yung-wei; Chinese Taipei	Lee Ha-rim; South Korea	Chae Kwang-jin; North Korea
Extra-lightweight (−60 kg)	Yang Yung-wei; Chinese Taipei	Lee Ha-rim; South Korea	Magzhan Shamshadin; Kazakhstan
Half-lightweight (−66 kg)	Ryoma Tanaka; Japan	Yondonperenlein Baskhüü; Mongolia	An Ba-ul; South Korea
Half-lightweight (−66 kg)	Ryoma Tanaka; Japan	Yondonperenlein Baskhüü; Mongolia	Bayanmönkhiin Narmandakh; United Arab Emirates
Lightweight (−73 kg)	Murodjon Yuldoshev; Uzbekistan	Soichi Hashimoto; Japan	Tsend-Ochiryn Tsogtbaatar; Mongolia
Lightweight (−73 kg)	Murodjon Yuldoshev; Uzbekistan	Soichi Hashimoto; Japan	Behruzi Khojazoda; Tajikistan
Half-middleweight (−81 kg)	Somon Makhmadbekov; Tajikistan	Lee Joon-hwan; South Korea	Abylaikhan Zhubanazar; Kazakhstan
Half-middleweight (−81 kg)	Somon Makhmadbekov; Tajikistan	Lee Joon-hwan; South Korea	Yuhei Oino; Japan
Middleweight (−90 kg)	Erlan Sherov; Kyrgyzstan	Davlat Bobonov; Uzbekistan	Aram Grigorian; United Arab Emirates
Middleweight (−90 kg)	Erlan Sherov; Kyrgyzstan	Davlat Bobonov; Uzbekistan	Caramnob Sagaipov; Lebanon
Half-heavyweight (−100 kg)	Muzaffarbek Turoboyev; Uzbekistan	Batkhuyagiin Gonchigsüren; Mongolia	Dzhafar Kostoev; United Arab Emirates
Half-heavyweight (−100 kg)	Muzaffarbek Turoboyev; Uzbekistan	Batkhuyagiin Gonchigsüren; Mongolia	Nurlykhan Sharkhan; Kazakhstan
Heavyweight (+100 kg)	Magomedomar Magomedomarov; United Arab Emirates	Temur Rakhimov; Tajikistan	Alisher Yusupov; Uzbekistan
Heavyweight (+100 kg)	Magomedomar Magomedomarov; United Arab Emirates	Temur Rakhimov; Tajikistan	Kim Min-jong; South Korea

=== Women's events ===
Event	Gold	Silver	Bronze
Extra-lightweight (−48 kg)	Natsumi Tsunoda; Japan	Abiba Abuzhakynova; Kazakhstan	Khalimajon Kurbonova; Uzbekistan
Extra-lightweight (−48 kg)	Natsumi Tsunoda; Japan	Abiba Abuzhakynova; Kazakhstan	Guo Zongying; China
Half-lightweight (−52 kg)	Diyora Keldiyorova; Uzbekistan	Bishreltiin Khorloodoi; United Arab Emirates	Lkhagvasürengiin Sosorbaram; Mongolia
Half-lightweight (−52 kg)	Diyora Keldiyorova; Uzbekistan	Bishreltiin Khorloodoi; United Arab Emirates	Jung Ye-rin; South Korea
Lightweight (−57 kg)	Lien Chen-ling; Chinese Taipei	Momo Tamaoki; Japan	Maýsa Pardaýewa; Turkmenistan
Lightweight (−57 kg)	Lien Chen-ling; Chinese Taipei	Momo Tamaoki; Japan	Park Eun-song; South Korea
Half-middleweight (−63 kg)	Miku Takaichi; Japan	Tang Jing; China	Esmigul Kuyulova; Kazakhstan
Half-middleweight (−63 kg)	Miku Takaichi; Japan	Tang Jing; China	Kim Ji-jeong; South Korea
Middleweight (−70 kg)	Shiho Tanaka; Japan	Mun Song-hui; North Korea	Gulnoza Matniyazova; Uzbekistan
Middleweight (−70 kg)	Shiho Tanaka; Japan	Mun Song-hui; North Korea	Feng Yingying; China
Half-heavyweight (−78 kg)	Ma Zhenzhao; China	Rika Takayama; Japan	Yoon Hyun-ji; South Korea
Half-heavyweight (−78 kg)	Ma Zhenzhao; China	Rika Takayama; Japan	Iriskhon Kurbanbaeva; Uzbekistan
Heavyweight (+78 kg)	Kim Ha-yun; South Korea	Xu Shiyan; China	Wakaba Tomita; Japan
Heavyweight (+78 kg)	Kim Ha-yun; South Korea	Xu Shiyan; China	Amarsaikhany Adiyaasüren; Mongolia

=== Mixed ===
Event	Gold	Silver	Bronze
Mixed team	Japan; Moka Kuwagata; Ruri Takahashi; Momo Tamaoki; Shiho Tanaka; Wakaba Tomita; Natsumi Tsunoda; Yuhei Oino; Hyoga Ota; Ken Oyoshi; Goki Tajima; Ryoma Tanaka; Aaron Wolf	Uzbekistan; Shukurjon Aminova; Rinata Ilmatova; Sevinch Isokova; Diyora Keldiyorova; Iriskhon Kurbanbaeva; Gulnoza Matniyazova; Shokhrukhkhon Bakhtiyorov; Davlat Bobonov; Sardor Nurillaev; Muso Sobirov; Murodjon Yuldoshev; Alisher Yusupov	China; Cai Qi; Feng Yingying; Ma Zhenzhao; Tang Jing; Xu Shiyan; Zhu Yeqing; Buhebilige; Li Ruixuan; Qingdaga; Sun Chuancheng; Xue Ziyang
Mixed team	Japan; Moka Kuwagata; Ruri Takahashi; Momo Tamaoki; Shiho Tanaka; Wakaba Tomita; Natsumi Tsunoda; Yuhei Oino; Hyoga Ota; Ken Oyoshi; Goki Tajima; Ryoma Tanaka; Aaron Wolf	Uzbekistan; Shukurjon Aminova; Rinata Ilmatova; Sevinch Isokova; Diyora Keldiyorova; Iriskhon Kurbanbaeva; Gulnoza Matniyazova; Shokhrukhkhon Bakhtiyorov; Davlat Bobonov; Sardor Nurillaev; Muso Sobirov; Murodjon Yuldoshev; Alisher Yusupov	Mongolia; Amarsaikhany Adiyaasüren; Batsuuriin Nyam-Erdene; Dambadarjaagiin Nominzul; Lkhagvasürengiin Sosorbaram; Lkhagvatogoogiin Enkhriilen; Mönkhtsedeviin Ichinkhorloo; Batkhuyagiin Gonchigsüren; Gantulgyn Altanbagana; Gereltuyaagiin Bolor-Ochir; Odkhüügiin Tsetsentsengel; Tsend-Ochiryn Tsogtbaatar; Yondonperenlein Baskhüü

=== Medal table ===
* Host nation (China)

Rank	Nation	Gold	Silver	Bronze	Total
1	Japan	5	3	2	10
2	Uzbekistan	3	2	4	9
3	Chinese Taipei	2	0	0	2
4	South Korea	1	2	6	9
5	China*	1	2	3	6
6	United Arab Emirates	1	1	3	5
7	Tajikistan	1	1	1	3
8	Kyrgyzstan	1	0	0	1
9	Mongolia	0	2	4	6
10	Kazakhstan	0	1	4	5
11	North Korea	0	1	1	2
12	Lebanon	0	0	1	1
12	Turkmenistan	0	0	1	1
Totals (13 entries)		15	15	30	60

== Participating Nations ==
A total of 236 athletes from 33 nations participated in the 2022 Asian Games.

- Afghanistan (2)
- Bhutan (3)
- Bahrain (6)
- Cambodia (2)
- China (12)
- Hong Kong (8)
- Indonesia (4)
- India (4)
- Iran (4)
- Iraq (1)
- Japan (17)
- Kazakhstan (14)
- Kyrgyzstan (11)
- South Korea (18)
- Kuwait (2)
- Laos (4)
- Lebanon (5)
- Macau (4)
- Mongolia (15)
- Nepal (8)
- Philippines (9)
- Palestine (2)
- North Korea (7)
- Qatar (2)
- Sri Lanka (1)
- Thailand (10)
- Tajikistan (11)
- Turkmenistan (8)
- Chinese Taipei (9)
- United Arab Emirates (8)
- Uzbekistan (15)
- Vietnam (7)
- Yemen (3)
