= Judo at the 2025 Summer World University Games – Women's +78 kg =

Women's +78 kg at the 2025 Summer World University Games
- Venue: Messe Essen
- Location: Essen
- Dates: 25 July
- Competitors: 22

Medalists
gold medal	Kim Ha-yun	South Korea
silver medal	Miki Mukunoki	Japan
bronze medal	Sophio Somkhishvili	Georgia
bronze medal	Jia Chundi	China

The women's +78 kg at the 2025 Summer World University Games in Rhine-Ruhr, Germany was held 25 July 2025. Kim Ha-yun of South Korea captured the gold medal. Miki Mukunoki of Japan took home the silver medal. The bronze medals were awarded to Sophio Somkhishvili of Georgia and Jia Chundi of China.

== Schedule ==
All times are Central European Time (UTC+1)

Date	Time	Event
25 July 2015	10:00	Preliminary Rounds
25 July 2015	17:00	Final Block

== Results ==
Athletes advanced through direct knockout rounds—including the round of 32, round of 16, quarterfinals, and semifinals—to determine the two finalists fighting for the gold and silver medals. Parallel to the main bracket, a repechage system allowed defeated quarterfinalists to work their way back into the tournament, culminating in two separate bronze medal matches where the repechage winners faced the losing semifinalists.

Round of 32
L Williams (GBR)	000 (yellow card)
N Suleymanova (AZE)	020 (yellow card)
G Coşkun (TUR)	000
M Rathi (IND)	012 (yellow card)
Lu Hh (TPE)	000
P Sweers (NED)	100
A Dashkina (AIN)	110
K Barra (CHI)	000
N Tarabay (LBN)	000
O Diacenco (MDA)	100
M Cobos (ESP)	000
D Nacer (FRA)	100

Round of 16
H Kim (KOR)	010
N Suleymanova (AZE)	000
A Ramazanova (KAZ)	100
Lai QL (MAC)	000
Jia CD (CHN)	100
M Rathi (IND)	000
I Kurbanbaeva (UZB)	000
P Sweers (NED)	100 (yellow card)
S Somkhishvili (GEO)	100 (yellow card)
A Dashkina (AIN)	000
K Wolszczak (POL)	010
O Diacenco (MDA)	000
E Simonetti (ITA)	010
T Silva (BRA)	000
M Mukunoki (JPN)	100
D Nacer (FRA)	000

Quarter-finals
H Kim (KOR)	101
A Ramazanova (KAZ)	001
Jia CD (CHN)	010 (yellow card)
P Sweers (NED)	000 (yellow card)
S Somkhishvili (GEO)	001
K Wolszczak (POL)	000 (yellow card)
E Simonetti (ITA)	000 (yellow card)
M Mukunoki (JPN)	101

Semi-finals
H Kim (KOR)	010
Jia CD (CHN)	000
S Somkhishvili (GEO)	000
M Mukunoki (JPN)	100 (yellow card)

Final
H Kim (KOR)	010 (yellow card)
M Mukunoki (JPN)	000

Repechage Phases

Repechage
A Ramazanova (KAZ)	020
P Sweers (NED)	000
K Wolszczak (POL)	000
E Simonetti (ITA)	010

Bronze medal
A Ramazanova (KAZ)	001
S Somkhishvili (GEO)	101
E Simonetti (ITA)	000 (yellow card)
Jia CD (CHN)	001
