= Judo at the 2024 Summer Olympics – Women's +78 kg =

Judo Women's +78 kg at the Games of the XXXIII Olympiad
- Venue: Grand Palais Éphémère
- Location: Paris, France
- Date: 2 August 2024
- Competitors: 26 from 26 nations
- Website: Official website

Medalists
gold medal	Beatriz Souza (1st title)	Brazil
silver medal	Raz Hershko	Israel
bronze medal	Kim Ha-yun	South Korea
bronze medal	Romane Dicko	France

Competition at external databases
- Links: IJF • JudoInside

The Women's +78 kg event in Judo at the 2024 Summer Olympics was held at the Grand Palais Éphémère in Paris, France on 2 August 2024.

== Summary ==
This is the ninth appearance of the women's heavyweight category.

Akira Sone lost to Kayra Özdemir, later, Sone got into repechages, Milica Žabić won over a repechage, Sone did not start, Idalys Ortiz lost to Žabić, one of the bronze medalists, Iryna Kindzerska did not qualify, Romane Dicko lost to eventual champion Beatriz Souza, later, Dicko won a bronze medal by beating Žabić.

== Results ==
=== Finals ===
Semi-finals
Romane Dicko (FRA)	00 (yellow card)
Beatriz Souza (BRA)	10 (yellow card)
Raz Hershko (ISR)	10
Kayra Özdemir (TUR)	00

Final
Beatriz Souza (BRA)	01
Raz Hershko (ISR)	00

=== Repechage ===
Repechage
Larisa Cerić (BIH)	00
Kim Ha-yun (KOR)	01 (yellow card)
Milica Žabić (SRB)	w/o
Akira Sone (JPN)	DNS

Bronze medal
Kim Ha-yun (KOR)	10 (yellow card)
Kayra Özdemir (TUR)	00 (yellow card)
Milica Žabić (SRB)	00
Romane Dicko (FRA)	10

=== Pool A ===
First round
Sophio Somkhishvili (GEO)	10
Renée Lucht (GER)	00
Rochele Nunes (POR)	10
Sarra Mzougui (TUN)	00
Sydnee Andrews (NZL)	00
Larisa Cerić (BIH)	10 (yellow card)

Round of 16
Romane Dicko (FRA)	10
Sophio Somkhishvili (GEO)	00
Rochele Nunes (POR)	00 (yellow card)
Larisa Cerić (BIH)	10 (yellow card)

Quarter-finals
Romane Dicko (FRA)	10
Larisa Cerić (BIH)	00

=== Pool B ===
First round
Mahboubeh Barbari Zharfi (EOR)	00
Moira Morillo (DOM)	10
Ana Laura Portuondo-Isasi (CAN)	00
Izayana Marenco (NCA)	10 (yellow card)

Round of 16
Kim Ha-yun (KOR)	10 (yellow card)
Moira Morillo (DOM)	00
Beatriz Souza (BRA)	10
Izayana Marenco (NCA)	00 (yellow card)

Quarter-finals
Kim Ha-yun (KOR)	00
Beatriz Souza (BRA)	01

=== Pool C ===
First round
Marit Kamps (NED)	10
Khrystyna Homan (UKR)	00
Asya Tavano (ITA)	00
Milica Žabić (SRB)	10
Idalys Ortiz (CUB)	10
Tulika Maan (IND)	00

Round of 16
Raz Hershko (ISR)	10 (yellow card)
Marit Kamps (NED)	00 (yellow card)
Milica Žabić (SRB)	10 (yellow card)
Idalys Ortiz (CUB)	00

Quarter-finals
Raz Hershko (ISR)	10 (yellow card)
Milica Žabić (SRB)	00 (yellow card)

=== Pool D ===
First round
Amarsaikhany Adiyaasüren (MGL)	10 (yellow card)
Kamila Berlikash (KAZ)	00
Richelle Anita Soppi Mbella (CMR)	00
Akira Sone (JPN)	10

Round of 16
Kayra Özdemir (TUR)	10 (yellow card)
Amarsaikhany Adiyaasüren (MGL)	00
Xu Shiyan (CHN)	00
Akira Sone (JPN)	01 (yellow card)

Quarter-finals
Kayra Özdemir (TUR)	01 (yellow card)
Akira Sone (JPN)	00

== Weigh-in List ==
Weights in table are listed in kg.

Result	Judoka	Weight
1st place, gold medalist(s)	Beatriz Souza (BRA)	135.2
2nd place, silver medalist(s)	Raz Hershko (ISR)	109.5
3rd place, bronze medalist(s)	Kim Ha-yun (KOR)	112.1
3rd place, bronze medalist(s)	Romane Dicko (FRA)	121.7
5	Kayra Ozdemir (TUR)	115.0
5	Milica Žabić (SRB)	97.4
7	Larisa Cerić (BIH)	99.7
7	Akira Sone (JPN)	109.3
9	Sophio Somkhishvili (GEO)	120.9
9	Rochele Nunes (POR)	114.9
9	Moira Morillo (DOM)	133.8
9	Izayana Marenco (NCA)	107.6
9	Marit Kamps (NED)	102.5
9	Idalys Ortiz (CUB)	138.3
9	Amarsaikhany Adiyaasüren (MGL)	99.9
9	Xu Shiyan (CHN)	133.3
17	Renée Lucht (GER)	99.1
17	Sarra Mzougui (TUN)	109.6
17	Sydnee Andrews (NZL)	120.2
17	Mahboubeh Barbari Zharfi (EOR)	114.2
17	Ana Laura Portuondo-Isasi (CAN)	92.1
17	Khrystyna Homan (UKR)	120.8
17	Asya Tavano (ITA)	116.6
17	Tulika Maan (IND)	119.4
17	Kamila Berlikash (KAZ)	137.3
17	Richelle Anita Soppi Mbella (CMR)	129.0
