= 2023 Judo Oceania Open Perth =

Judo Competition

Judo 2023 Judo Perth Oceania Open
- Venue: Perth High Performance Centre
- Location: Perth, Western Australia
- Dates: 10–11 November 2023
- Competitors: 299 from 64 nations

Competition at external databases
- Links: IJF • JudoInside

The 2023 Judo Oceania Open Perth was a judo competition held in Perth, Western Australia, from 10 to 11 November 2023 as part of the IJF World Tour and during the 2024 Summer Olympics qualification period. Like the 2019 and 2022 Judo Oceania Open Perth before it, this "Continental Open" level event's rules will be those of a Grand Prix level event, and it will award ranking points as one.

== Medal summary ==
=== Men's events ===
Event	Gold	Silver	Bronze
Extra-lightweight (−60 kg)	Yang Yung-wei (TPE)	Lin Chong-you (TPE)	Michel Augusto (BRA)
Extra-lightweight (−60 kg)	Yang Yung-wei (TPE)	Lin Chong-you (TPE)	Rodrigo Costa Lopes (POR)
Half-lightweight (−66 kg)	Abderrahmane Boushita (MAR)	Luukas Saha (FIN)	Georgios Balarjishvili (CYP)
Half-lightweight (−66 kg)	Abderrahmane Boushita (MAR)	Luukas Saha (FIN)	Martin Setz (GER)
Lightweight (−73 kg)	Bajsangur Bagajev (SRB)	Jorge Cano García (ESP)	Jack Yonezuka (USA)
Lightweight (−73 kg)	Bajsangur Bagajev (SRB)	Jorge Cano García (ESP)	Eric Ham (GBR)
Half-middleweight (−81 kg)	Giacomo Gamba (ITA)	Adam Kopecký (CZE)	Lachlan Moorhead (GBR)
Half-middleweight (−81 kg)	Giacomo Gamba (ITA)	Adam Kopecký (CZE)	Aurélien Bonferroni (SUI)
Middleweight (−90 kg)	Murad Fatiyev (AZE)	Klen-Kristofer Kaljulaid (EST)	Lee Sung-ho (KOR)
Middleweight (−90 kg)	Murad Fatiyev (AZE)	Klen-Kristofer Kaljulaid (EST)	Jamal Petgrave (GBR)
Half-heavyweight (−100 kg)	Leonardo Gonçalves (BRA)	Rafael Buzacarini (BRA)	Piotr Kuczera (POL)
Half-heavyweight (−100 kg)	Leonardo Gonçalves (BRA)	Rafael Buzacarini (BRA)	Anton Savytskiy (UKR)
Heavyweight (+100 kg)	Márius Fízeľ (SVK)	Erik Abramov (GER)	Kacper Szczurowski (POL)
Heavyweight (+100 kg)	Márius Fízeľ (SVK)	Erik Abramov (GER)	Losseni Kone (GER)

=== Women's events ===
Event	Gold	Silver	Bronze
Extra-lightweight (−48 kg)	Lee Hye-kyeong (KOR)	Xinran Hui (CHN)	Tuğçe Beder (TUR)
Extra-lightweight (−48 kg)	Lee Hye-kyeong (KOR)	Xinran Hui (CHN)	Katharina Menz (GER)
Half-lightweight (−52 kg)	Ariane Toro (ESP)	Zhu Yeqing (CHN)	Aleksandra Kaleta (POL)
Half-lightweight (−52 kg)	Ariane Toro (ESP)	Zhu Yeqing (CHN)	Aydan Valiyeva (AZE)
Lightweight (−57 kg)	Huh Mi-mi (KOR)	Nekoda Smythe-Davis (GBR)	Mina Libeer (BEL)
Lightweight (−57 kg)	Huh Mi-mi (KOR)	Nekoda Smythe-Davis (GBR)	Arleta Podolak (POL)
Half-middleweight (−63 kg)	Tang Jing (CHN)	Katharina Haecker (AUS)	Amina Belkadi (ALG)
Half-middleweight (−63 kg)	Tang Jing (CHN)	Katharina Haecker (AUS)	Kim Ji-su (KOR)
Middleweight (−70 kg)	María Pérez (PUR)	Miriam Butkereit (GER)	Aoife Coughlan (AUS)
Middleweight (−70 kg)	María Pérez (PUR)	Miriam Butkereit (GER)	Fidan Ögel (TUR)
Half-heavyweight (−78 kg)	Giorgia Stangherlin (ITA)	Metka Lobnik (SLO)	Alina Böhm (GER)
Half-heavyweight (−78 kg)	Giorgia Stangherlin (ITA)	Metka Lobnik (SLO)	Lee Jeong-yun (KOR)
Heavyweight (+78 kg)	Xu Shiyan (CHN)	Beatriz Souza (BRA)	Su Xin (CHN)
Heavyweight (+78 kg)	Xu Shiyan (CHN)	Beatriz Souza (BRA)	Renée Lucht (GER)

Source results:

=== Medal table ===
* Host nation (Australia)

Rank	Nation	Gold	Silver	Bronze	Total
1	China (CHN)	2	2	1	5
2	South Korea (KOR)	2	0	3	5
3	Italy (ITA)	2	0	0	2
4	Brazil (BRA)	1	2	1	4
5	Chinese Taipei (TPE)	1	1	0	2
5	Spain (ESP)	1	1	0	2
7	Azerbaijan (AZE)	1	0	1	2
8	Morocco (MAR)	1	0	0	1
8	Puerto Rico (PUR)	1	0	0	1
8	Serbia (SRB)	1	0	0	1
8	Slovakia (SVK)	1	0	0	1
12	Germany (GER)	0	2	5	7
13	Great Britain (GBR)	0	1	3	4
14	Australia (AUS)*	0	1	1	2
15	Czech Republic (CZE)	0	1	0	1
15	Estonia (EST)	0	1	0	1
15	Finland (FIN)	0	1	0	1
15	Slovenia (SLO)	0	1	0	1
19	Poland (POL)	0	0	4	4
20	Turkey (TUR)	0	0	2	2
21	Algeria (ALG)	0	0	1	1
21	Belgium (BEL)	0	0	1	1
21	Cyprus (CYP)	0	0	1	1
21	Portugal (POR)	0	0	1	1
21	Switzerland (SUI)	0	0	1	1
21	Ukraine (UKR)	0	0	1	1
21	United States (USA)	0	0	1	1
Totals (27 entries)		14	14	28	56
