= 2023 Judo Grand Slam Ulaanbaatar =

Judo competition in Ulaanbaatar, Mongolia

Judo 2023 Judo Grand Slam Ulaanbaatar
- Venue: AIC Steppe Arena
- Location: Ulaanbaatar, Mongolia
- Dates: 23–25 June 2023
- Competitors: 344 from 44 nations
- Total prize money: €154,000

Competition at external databases
- Links: IJF • EJU • JudoInside

The 2023 Judo Grand Slam Ulaanbaatar is a judo competition of the Grand Slam series that was held at the Steppe Arena in Ulaanbaatar, Mongolia from 23 to 25 June 2023 as part of the IJF World Tour and during the 2024 Summer Olympics qualification period.

== Medal summary ==
=== Men's events ===
Event	Gold	Silver	Bronze
Extra-lightweight (−60 kg)	Ryuju Nagayama (JPN)	Romain Valadier-Picard (FRA)	Lee Ha-rim (KOR)
Extra-lightweight (−60 kg)	Ryuju Nagayama (JPN)	Romain Valadier-Picard (FRA)	Ramazan Abdulaev (AIN)
Half-lightweight (−66 kg)	Yondonperenlein Baskhüü (MGL)	Obid Dzhebov (TJK)	Yashar Najafov (AZE)
Half-lightweight (−66 kg)	Yondonperenlein Baskhüü (MGL)	Obid Dzhebov (TJK)	Battogtokhyn Erkhembayar (MGL)
Lightweight (−73 kg)	Ken Oyoshi (JPN)	Danil Lavrentev (AIN)	Batzayaagiin Erdenebayar (MGL)
Lightweight (−73 kg)	Ken Oyoshi (JPN)	Danil Lavrentev (AIN)	Ayub Khazhaliev (AIN)
Half-middleweight (−81 kg)	Kenya Kohara (JPN)	Lee Joon-hwan (KOR)	Abylaikhan Zhubanazar (KAZ)
Half-middleweight (−81 kg)	Kenya Kohara (JPN)	Lee Joon-hwan (KOR)	Alan Khubetsov (AIN)
Middleweight (−90 kg)	Mikhail Igolnikov (AIN)	Erlan Sherov (KGZ)	Alexis Mathieu (FRA)
Middleweight (−90 kg)	Mikhail Igolnikov (AIN)	Erlan Sherov (KGZ)	Péter Sáfrány (HUN)
Half-heavyweight (−100 kg)	Batkhuyagiin Gonchigsüren (MGL)	Varlam Liparteliani (GEO)	Arman Adamian (AIN)
Half-heavyweight (−100 kg)	Batkhuyagiin Gonchigsüren (MGL)	Varlam Liparteliani (GEO)	Aaron Wolf (JPN)
Heavyweight (+100 kg)	Inal Tasoev (AIN)	Kim Min-jong (KOR)	Odkhüügiin Tsetsentsengel (MGL)
Heavyweight (+100 kg)	Inal Tasoev (AIN)	Kim Min-jong (KOR)	Losseni Kone (GER)

=== Women's events ===
Event	Gold	Silver	Bronze
Extra-lightweight (−48 kg)	Hikari Yoshioka (JPN)	Sabina Giliazova (AIN)	Catarina Costa (POR)
Extra-lightweight (−48 kg)	Hikari Yoshioka (JPN)	Sabina Giliazova (AIN)	Tamar Malca (ISR)
Half-lightweight (−52 kg)	Gefen Primo (ISR)	Amandine Buchard (FRA)	Réka Pupp (HUN)
Half-lightweight (−52 kg)	Gefen Primo (ISR)	Amandine Buchard (FRA)	Diyora Keldiyorova (UZB)
Lightweight (−57 kg)	Christa Deguchi (CAN)	Jessica Klimkait (CAN)	Huh Mi-mi (KOR)
Lightweight (−57 kg)	Christa Deguchi (CAN)	Jessica Klimkait (CAN)	Kseniia Galitskaia (AIN)
Half-middleweight (−63 kg)	Nami Nabekura (JPN)	Szofi Özbas (HUN)	Andreja Leški (SLO)
Half-middleweight (−63 kg)	Nami Nabekura (JPN)	Szofi Özbas (HUN)	Gili Sharir (ISR)
Middleweight (−70 kg)	Shiho Tanaka (JPN)	Lara Cvjetko (CRO)	Madina Taimazova (AIN)
Middleweight (−70 kg)	Shiho Tanaka (JPN)	Lara Cvjetko (CRO)	Maya Goshen (ISR)
Half-heavyweight (−78 kg)	Inbar Lanir (ISR)	Mami Umeki (JPN)	Rika Takayama (JPN)
Half-heavyweight (−78 kg)	Inbar Lanir (ISR)	Mami Umeki (JPN)	Patrícia Sampaio (POR)
Heavyweight (+78 kg)	Wakaba Tomita (JPN)	Raz Hershko (ISR)	Kim Ha-yun (KOR)
Heavyweight (+78 kg)	Wakaba Tomita (JPN)	Raz Hershko (ISR)	Dambadarjaagiin Nominzul (MGL)

Source Results

=== Medal table ===
* Host nation (Mongolia)

Rank	Nation	Gold	Silver	Bronze	Total
1	Japan (JPN)	7	1	2	10
–	Individual Neutral Athletes	2	2	6	10
2	Israel (ISR)	2	1	3	6
3	Mongolia (MGL)*	2	0	4	6
4	Canada (CAN)	1	1	0	2
5	South Korea (KOR)	0	2	3	5
6	France (FRA)	0	2	1	3
7	Hungary (HUN)	0	1	2	3
8	Croatia (CRO)	0	1	0	1
8	Georgia (GEO)	0	1	0	1
8	Kyrgyzstan (KGZ)	0	1	0	1
8	Tajikistan (TJK)	0	1	0	1
12	Portugal (POR)	0	0	2	2
13	Azerbaijan (AZE)	0	0	1	1
13	Germany (GER)	0	0	1	1
13	Kazakhstan (KAZ)	0	0	1	1
13	Slovenia (SLO)	0	0	1	1
13	Uzbekistan (UZB)	0	0	1	1
Totals (17 entries)		14	14	28	56

== Prize money ==
The sums written are per medalist, bringing the total prizes awarded to €154,000. (retrieved from:)

Medal	Total	Judoka	Coach
Gold	€5,000	€4,000	€1,000
Silver	€3,000	€2,400	€600
Bronze	€1,500	€1,200	€300
