= 2022 Judo Grand Slam Paris =

Judo 2022 Judo Grand Slam Paris
- Venue: Accor Arena
- Location: Paris, France
- Dates: 5–6 February 2022
- Competitors: 285 from 52 nations
- Total prize money: 154,000€

Competition at external databases
- Links: IJF • EJU • JudoInside

The 2022 Judo Grand Slam Paris was held in Paris, France, on 5–6 February 2022.

== Event videos ==
The event was aired freely on the IJF YouTube channel.

	Weight classes	Preliminaries				Final Block
Day 1	Men: -60, -66, -73 Women: -48, -52, -57, -63	Commentated: English				Tatami 2
Day 1	Men: -60, -66, -73 Women: -48, -52, -57, -63	Tatami 1	Tatami 2	Tatami 3	Tatami 4	Tatami 3
Day 2	Men: -81, -90, -100, +100 Women: -70, -78, +78	Commentated: English				Tatami 2
Day 2	Men: -81, -90, -100, +100 Women: -70, -78, +78	Tatami 1	Tatami 2	Tatami 3	Tatami 4	Tatami 3

== Medal summary ==
=== Medal table ===
* Host nation (France)

Rank	Nation	Gold	Silver	Bronze	Total
1	Japan (JPN)	7	5	6	18
2	France (FRA)*	3	1	7	11
3	Mongolia (MGL)	2	1	1	4
4	Georgia (GEO)	1	1	2	4
5	Belgium (BEL)	1	0	1	2
6	South Korea (KOR)	0	2	3	5
7	Azerbaijan (AZE)	0	2	0	2
8	Israel (ISR)	0	1	0	1
8	Kosovo (KOS)	0	1	0	1
10	Uzbekistan (UZB)	0	0	3	3
11	Croatia (CRO)	0	0	1	1
11	Netherlands (NED)	0	0	1	1
11	Poland (POL)	0	0	1	1
11	Switzerland (SUI)	0	0	1	1
11	Turkey (TUR)	0	0	1	1
Totals (15 entries)		14	14	28	56

=== Men's events ===
Event	Gold	Silver	Bronze
Extra-lightweight (−60 kg)	Ryuju Nagayama (JPN)	Jeon Seung-beom (KOR)	Luka Mkheidze (FRA)
Extra-lightweight (−60 kg)	Ryuju Nagayama (JPN)	Jeon Seung-beom (KOR)	Jaba Papinashvili (GEO)
Half-lightweight (−66 kg)	Yondonperenlein Baskhüü (MGL)	An Ba-ul (KOR)	Vazha Margvelashvili (GEO)
Half-lightweight (−66 kg)	Yondonperenlein Baskhüü (MGL)	An Ba-ul (KOR)	Ryoma Tanaka (JPN)
Lightweight (−73 kg)	Lasha Shavdatuashvili (GEO)	Soichi Hashimoto (JPN)	Tsend-Ochiryn Tsogtbaatar (MGL)
Lightweight (−73 kg)	Lasha Shavdatuashvili (GEO)	Soichi Hashimoto (JPN)	Benjamin Axus (FRA)
Half-middleweight (−81 kg)	Sotaro Fujiwara (JPN)	Tato Grigalashvili (GEO)	Sami Chouchi (BEL)
Half-middleweight (−81 kg)	Sotaro Fujiwara (JPN)	Tato Grigalashvili (GEO)	Sharofiddin Boltaboev (UZB)
Middleweight (−90 kg)	Sanshiro Murao (JPN)	Mammadali Mehdiyev (AZE)	Davlat Bobonov (UZB)
Middleweight (−90 kg)	Sanshiro Murao (JPN)	Mammadali Mehdiyev (AZE)	Mihael Žgank (TUR)
Half-heavyweight (−100 kg)	Toma Nikiforov (BEL)	Peter Paltchik (ISR)	Muzaffarbek Turoboyev (UZB)
Half-heavyweight (−100 kg)	Toma Nikiforov (BEL)	Peter Paltchik (ISR)	Kentaro Iida (JPN)
Heavyweight (+100 kg)	Odkhüügiin Tsetsentsengel (MGL)	Ushangi Kokauri (AZE)	Kim Min-jong (KOR)
Heavyweight (+100 kg)	Odkhüügiin Tsetsentsengel (MGL)	Ushangi Kokauri (AZE)	Kokoro Kageura (JPN)

=== Women's events ===
Event	Gold	Silver	Bronze
Extra-lightweight (−48 kg)	Natsumi Tsunoda (JPN)	Bavuudorjiin Baasankhüü (MGL)	Wakana Koga (JPN)
Extra-lightweight (−48 kg)	Natsumi Tsunoda (JPN)	Bavuudorjiin Baasankhüü (MGL)	Blandine Pont (FRA)
Half-lightweight (−52 kg)	Amandine Buchard (FRA)	Distria Krasniqi (KOS)	Ai Shishime (JPN)
Half-lightweight (−52 kg)	Amandine Buchard (FRA)	Distria Krasniqi (KOS)	Fabienne Kocher (SUI)
Lightweight (−57 kg)	Haruka Funakubo (JPN)	Momo Tamaoki (JPN)	Priscilla Gneto (FRA)
Lightweight (−57 kg)	Haruka Funakubo (JPN)	Momo Tamaoki (JPN)	Sarah-Léonie Cysique (FRA)
Half-middleweight (−63 kg)	Nami Nabekura (JPN)	Masako Doi (JPN)	Angelika Szymańska (POL)
Half-middleweight (−63 kg)	Nami Nabekura (JPN)	Masako Doi (JPN)	Sanne Vermeer (NED)
Middleweight (−70 kg)	Margaux Pinot (FRA)	Saki Niizoe (JPN)	Yoko Ono (JPN)
Middleweight (−70 kg)	Margaux Pinot (FRA)	Saki Niizoe (JPN)	Barbara Matić (CRO)
Half-heavyweight (−78 kg)	Audrey Tcheuméo (FRA)	Mami Umeki (JPN)	Lee Jeong-yun (KOR)
Half-heavyweight (−78 kg)	Audrey Tcheuméo (FRA)	Mami Umeki (JPN)	Madeleine Malonga (FRA)
Heavyweight (+78 kg)	Wakaba Tomita (JPN)	Romane Dicko (FRA)	Julia Tolofua (FRA)
Heavyweight (+78 kg)	Wakaba Tomita (JPN)	Romane Dicko (FRA)	Kim Ha-yun (KOR)

Source Results

== Prize money ==
The sums written are per medalist, bringing the total prizes awarded to 154,000€. (retrieved from:)

Medal	Total	Judoka	Coach
Gold	5,000€	4,000€	1,000€
Silver	3,000€	2,400€	600€
Bronze	1,500€	1,200€	300€
