= Judo at the 2022 Asian Games – Mixed team =

Judo competition

Judo Mixed team at the 2022 Asian Games
- Venue: Xiaoshan Linpu Gymnasium
- Date: 27 September 2023
- Competitors: 97 from 9 nations

Medalists
gold medal	Japan; Moka Kuwagata, Ruri Takahashi, Momo Tamaoki, Shiho Tanaka, Wakaba Tomita, Natsumi Tsunoda, Yuhei Oino, Hyoga Ota, Ken Oyoshi, Goki Tajima, Ryoma Tanaka, Aaron Wolf
silver medal	Uzbekistan; Shukurjon Aminova, Rinata Ilmatova, Sevinch Isokova, Diyora Keldiyorova, Iriskhon Kurbanbaeva, Gulnoza Matniyazova, Shokhrukhkhon Bakhtiyorov, Davlat Bobonov, Sardor Nurillaev, Muso Sobirov, Murodjon Yuldoshev, Alisher Yusupov
bronze medal	China; Cai Qi, Feng Yingying, Ma Zhenzhao, Tang Jing, Xu Shiyan, Zhu Yeqing, Buhebilige, Li Ruixuan, Qingdaga, Sun Chuancheng, Xue Ziyang
bronze medal	Mongolia; Amarsaikhany Adiyaasüren, Batsuuriin Nyam-Erdene, Dambadarjaagiin Nominzul, Lkhagvasürengiin Sosorbaram, Lkhagvatogoogiin Enkhriilen, Mönkhtsedeviin Ichinkhorloo, Batkhuyagiin Gonchigsüren, Gantulgyn Altanbagana, Gereltuyaagiin Bolor-Ochir, Odkhüügiin Tsetsentsengel, Tsend-Ochiryn Tsogtbaatar, Yondonperenlein Baskhüü

The mixed team competition at the 2022 Asian Games in Hangzhou was held on 27 September 2023 at the Xiaoshan Linpu Gymnasium.

== Schedule ==
All times are China Standard Time (UTC+08:00)

Date	Time	Event
Wednesday, 27 September 2023	10:00	Preliminary Rounds
Wednesday, 27 September 2023	16:00	Final Block

== Results ==
=== Bracket ===
==== Main ====
Elimination round of 16
Philippines	0
Thailand	4

Quarterfinals
Japan	4
Nepal	0
South Korea	4
Kazakhstan	2
Uzbekistan	4
Thailand	0
China	4
Mongolia	3

Semifinals
Japan	4
South Korea	0
Uzbekistan	4
China	2

Gold medal contest
Japan	4
Uzbekistan	0

==== Repechage ====
Repechage
Kazakhstan	4
Nepal	0
Thailand	0
Mongolia	4

Bronze medal contests
Kazakhstan	4
China	2
Mongolia	4
South Korea	1

=== Elimination round of 16 ===
Philippines	0–4	Thailand

Ryoko Salinas	00–10	Supattra Nanong	Women's 70 kg
John Viron Ferrer	00–10	Wei Puyang	Men's 90 kg
Kiyomi Watanabe	00–10	Thonthan Satjadet	Women's +70 kg
Carl Dave Aseneta	00–10	Kittipong Hantratin	Men's +90 kg

=== Quarterfinals ===
Japan	4–0	Nepal

Goki Tajima	10–00	Janga Bahadur Saru	Men's 90 kg
Ruri Takahashi	10–00	Aakriti Joshi	Women's +70 kg
Hyoga Ota	10–00	Ranjesh Gole	Men's +90 kg
Momo Tamaoki	10–00	Manita Shrestha Pradhan	Women's 57 kg

South Korea	4–2	Kazakhstan

Lee Sung-ho	11–01	Didar Khamza	Men's 90 kg
Kim Ha-yun	10–00	Kamila Berlikash	Women's +70 kg
Kim Min-jong	00–10	Galymzhan Krikbay	Men's +90 kg
Huh Mi-mi	10–00	Sevara Nishanbayeva	Women's 57 kg
Lee Eun-kyul	00–10	Daniyar Shamshayev	Men's 73 kg
Han Hee-ju	10–00	Anastassiya Mayakova	Women's 70 kg

Uzbekistan	4–0	Thailand

Davlat Bobonov	10–00	Wei Puyang	Men's 90 kg
Rinata Ilmatova	10–00	Thonthan Satjadet	Women's +70 kg
Shokhrukhkhon Bakhtiyorov	10–00	Kittipong Hantratin	Men's +90 kg
Shukurjon Aminova	11–00	Kanyawee Prasertsri	Women's 57 kg

China	4–3	Mongolia

Buhebilige	00–10	Gantulgyn Altanbagana	Men's 90 kg
Xu Shiyan	11–00	Dambadarjaagiin Nominzul	Women's +70 kg
Li Ruixuan	00–10	Odkhüügiin Tsetsentsengel	Men's +90 kg
Cai Qi	00–10	Lkhagvatogoogiin Enkhriilen	Women's 57 kg
Qingdaga	10–00	Tsend-Ochiryn Tsogtbaatar	Men's 73kg
Feng Yingying	11–00	Batsuuriin Nyam-Erdene	Women's 70kg
Buhebilige	10–00	Gantulgyn Altanbagana	Men's 90 kg

=== Repechage ===
Kazakhstan	4–0	Nepal

Kamila Berlikash	10–00	Aakriti Joshi	Women's +70 kg
Galymzhan Krikbay	10–00	Ranjesh Gole	Men's +90 kg
Sevara Nishanbayeva	10–00	Manita Shrestha Pradhan	Women's 57 kg
Daniyar Shamshayev	10–00	Indra Bahadur Shrestha	Men's 73 kg

Thailand	0–4	Mongolia

Thonthan Satjadet	00–10	Dambadarjaagiin Nominzul	Women's +70 kg
Kittipong Hantratin	00–10	Odkhüügiin Tsetsentsengel	Men's +90 kg
Kanyawee Prasertsri	00–10	Lkhagvatogoogiin Enkhriilen	Women's 57 kg
00–10	Gantulgyn Altanbagana	Men's 90kg

=== Semifinals ===
Japan	4–0	South Korea

Ruri Takahashi	01–00	Kim Ha-yun	Women's +70 kg
Hyoga Ota	10–00	Kim Min-jong	Men's +90 kg
Momo Tamaoki	01–00	Huh Mi-mi	Women's 57 kg
Ken Oyoshi	10–00	Lee Eun-kyul	Men's 73 kg

Uzbekistan	4–2	China

Rinata Ilmatova	00–10	Xu Shiyan	Women's +70 kg
Alisher Yusupov	10–00	Li Ruixuan	Men's +90 kg
Diyora Keldiyorova	10–00	Cai Qi	Women's 57 kg
Murodjon Yuldoshev	11–00	Qingdaga	Men's 73 kg
Gulnoza Matniyazova	00–11	Feng Yingying	Women's 70 kg
Davlat Bobonov	10–00	Buhebilige	Men's 90 kg

=== Bronze medal contests ===
Mongolia	4–1	South Korea

Odkhüügiin Tsetsentsengel	01–00	Han Ju-yeop	Men's +90 kg
Lkhagvatogoogiin Enkhriilen	01–00	Huh Mi-mi	Women's 57 kg
Tsend-Ochiryn Tsogtbaatar	01–00	Lee Eun-kyul	Men's 73 kg
Batsuuriin Nyam-Erdene	01–10	Han Hee-ju	Women's 70 kg
Gantulgyn Altanbagana	01–00	Lee Sung-ho	Men's 90 kg

Kazakhstan	2–4	China

Galymzhan Krikbay	10–00	Li Ruixuan	Men's +90 kg
Sevara Nishanbayeva	00–01	Cai Qi	Women's 57 kg
Daniyar Shamshayev	10–00	Qingdaga	Men's 73 kg
Anastassiya Mayakova	00–10	Tang Jing	Women's 70 kg
Didar Khamza	00–01	Buhebilige	Men's 90 kg
Kamila Berlikash	00–10	Xu Shiyan	Women's +70 kg

=== Gold medal contest ===
Japan	4–0	Uzbekistan

Hyoga Ota	01–00	Alisher Yusupov	Men's +90 kg
Momo Tamaoki	10–00	Diyora Keldiyorova	Women's 57 kg
Ken Oyoshi	10–00	Murodjon Yuldoshev	Men's 73 kg
Shiho Tanaka	10–00	Gulnoza Matniyazova	Women's 70 kg

== Non-participating athletes ==
- Ma Zhenzhao (CHN)
- Zhu Yeqing (CHN)
- Sun Chuancheng (CHN)
- Xue Ziyang (CHN)
- Ryoma Tanaka (JPN)
- Yuhei Oino (JPN)
- Aaron Wolf (JPN)
- Natsumi Tsunoda (JPN)
- Moka Kuwagata (JPN)
- Wakaba Tomita (JPN)
- Gusman Kyrgyzbayev (KAZ)
- Abylaikhan Zhubanazar (KAZ)
- Nurlykhan Sharkhan (KAZ)
- Galiya Tynbayeva (KAZ)
- Esmigul Kuyulova (KAZ)
- Aruna Jangeldina (KAZ)
- Kang Heon-cheol (KOR)
- Won Jong-hoon (KOR)
- Park Eun-song (KOR)
- Kim Ji-jeong (KOR)
- Park Saet-byeol (KOR)
- Yondonperenlein Baskhüü (MGL)
- Gereltuyaagiin Bolor-Ochir (MGL)
- Batkhuyagiin Gonchigsüren (MGL)
- Lkhagvasürengiin Sosorbaram (MGL)
- Mönkhtsedeviin Ichinkhorloo (MGL)
- Amarsaikhany Adiyaasüren (MGL)
- Vikas B.K. (NEP)
- Debaki Maya Shrestha (NEP)
- Punam Shrestha (NEP)
- Keisei Nakano (PHI)
- Shugen Nakano (PHI)
- Rena Furukawa (PHI)
- Leah Jhane Lopez (PHI)
- Dylwynn Keith Gimena (PHI)
- Surasak Puntanam (THA)
- Masayuki Terada (THA)
- Pimngam Ngamluan (THA)
- Ikumi Oeda (THA)
- Sardor Nurillaev (UZB)
- Muso Sobirov (UZB)
- Sevinch Isokova (UZB)
- Iriskhon Kurbanbaeva (UZB)
