= 2022 Judo Grand Prix Almada =

Judo competition

Judo 2022 Judo Grand Prix Almada
- Venue: Municipal Sports Complex of the City of Almada
- Location: Almada, Portugal
- Dates: 28–30 January 2022
- Competitors: 301 from 41 nations
- Total prize money: 98,000€

Competition at external databases
- Links: IJF • EJU • JudoInside

The 2022 Judo Grand Prix Almada was held in Almada, Portugal, from 28 to 30 January 2022.

It was the first time that Portugal was the stage for a world tour event. This tournament will be repeated annually until at least 2024.

As the qualification for the Olympic Games in Paris lasts for only two years, this tournament had no impact on the ranking for the Olympic Games.

== Event videos ==
The event will air freely on the IJF YouTube channel.

	Weight classes	Preliminaries			Final Block
Day 1	Men: -60, -66 Women: -48, -52, -57	Commentated			Commentated
Day 1	Men: -60, -66 Women: -48, -52, -57	Tatami 1	Tatami 2	Tatami 3	Commentated
Day 2	Men: -73, -81 Women: -63, -70	Commentated			Commentated
Day 2	Men: -73, -81 Women: -63, -70	Tatami 1	Tatami 2	Tatami 3	Commentated
Day 3	Men: -90, -100, +100 Women: -78, +78	Commentated			Commentated
Day 3	Men: -90, -100, +100 Women: -78, +78	Tatami 1	Tatami 2	Tatami 3	Commentated

== Medal summary ==
=== Medal table ===
* Host nation (Portugal)

Rank	Nation	Gold	Silver	Bronze	Total
1	South Korea (KOR)	4	1	4	9
2	Netherlands (NED)	2	1	1	4
3	Portugal (POR)*	2	0	2	4
4	Croatia (CRO)	1	2	0	3
5	Brazil (BRA)	1	0	1	2
6	Belgium (BEL)	1	0	0	1
6	Kosovo (KOS)	1	0	0	1
6	Moldova (MDA)	1	0	0	1
6	Uzbekistan (UZB)	1	0	0	1
10	Switzerland (SUI)	0	2	1	3
11	Italy (ITA)	0	2	0	2
12	France (FRA)	0	1	3	4
13	Japan (JPN)	0	1	2	3
14	Hungary (HUN)	0	1	1	2
14	Spain (ESP)	0	1	1	2
16	Azerbaijan (AZE)	0	1	0	1
16	Finland (FIN)	0	1	0	1
18	Mongolia (MGL)	0	0	3	3
19	Romania (ROU)	0	0	2	2
20	Czech Republic (CZE)	0	0	1	1
20	Georgia (GEO)	0	0	1	1
20	Israel (ISR)	0	0	1	1
20	Senegal (SEN)	0	0	1	1
20	Tajikistan (TJK)	0	0	1	1
20	Ukraine (UKR)	0	0	1	1
20	United States (USA)	0	0	1	1
Totals (26 entries)		14	14	28	56

=== Men's events ===
Event	Gold	Silver	Bronze
Extra-lightweight (–60 kg)	Lee Ha-rim (KOR)	Balabay Aghayev (AZE)	Byambajavyn Tsogt-Ochir (MGL)
Extra-lightweight (–60 kg)	Lee Ha-rim (KOR)	Balabay Aghayev (AZE)	Taiki Nakamura (JPN)
Half-lightweight (–66 kg)	Denis Vieru (MDA)	Freddy Waizenegger (SUI)	An Ba-ul (KOR)
Half-lightweight (–66 kg)	Denis Vieru (MDA)	Freddy Waizenegger (SUI)	Bogdan Iadov (UKR)
Lightweight (–73 kg)	Murodjon Yuldoshev (UZB)	Salvador Cases (ESP)	Lavjargalyn Ankhzayaa (MGL)
Lightweight (–73 kg)	Murodjon Yuldoshev (UZB)	Salvador Cases (ESP)	Joan-Benjamin Gaba (FRA)
Half-middleweight (–81 kg)	Matthias Casse (BEL)	Oskari Mäkinen (FIN)	Yuhei Oino (JPN)
Half-middleweight (–81 kg)	Matthias Casse (BEL)	Oskari Mäkinen (FIN)	Kim Jong-hoon (KOR)
Middleweight (–90 kg)	Jesper Smink (NED)	Christian Parlati (ITA)	Alex Creţ (ROU)
Middleweight (–90 kg)	Jesper Smink (NED)	Christian Parlati (ITA)	Komronshokh Ustopiriyon (TJK)
Half-heavyweight (–100 kg)	Jorge Fonseca (POR)	Daniel Eich (SUI)	Giorgi Beriashvili (GEO)
Half-heavyweight (–100 kg)	Jorge Fonseca (POR)	Daniel Eich (SUI)	L.A. Smith III (USA)
Heavyweight (+100 kg)	Kim Min-jong (KOR)	Yuta Nakamura (JPN)	Mbagnick Ndiaye (SEN)
Heavyweight (+100 kg)	Kim Min-jong (KOR)	Yuta Nakamura (JPN)	Richárd Sipőcz (HUN)

=== Women's events ===
Event	Gold	Silver	Bronze
Extra-lightweight (–48 kg)	Catarina Costa (POR)	Lee Hye-kyeong (KOR)	Mélanie Vieu (FRA)
Extra-lightweight (–48 kg)	Catarina Costa (POR)	Lee Hye-kyeong (KOR)	Léa Beres (FRA)
Half-lightweight (–52 kg)	Distria Krasniqi (KOS)	Ana Viktorija Puljiz (CRO)	Fabienne Kocher (SUI)
Half-lightweight (–52 kg)	Distria Krasniqi (KOS)	Ana Viktorija Puljiz (CRO)	Joana Diogo (POR)
Lightweight (–57 kg)	Rafaela Silva (BRA)	Pleuni Cornelisse (NED)	Park Eun-song (KOR)
Lightweight (–57 kg)	Rafaela Silva (BRA)	Pleuni Cornelisse (NED)	Telma Monteiro (POR)
Half-middleweight (–63 kg)	Joanne van Lieshout (NED)	Iva Oberan (CRO)	Florentina Ivănescu (ROU)
Half-middleweight (–63 kg)	Joanne van Lieshout (NED)	Iva Oberan (CRO)	Renata Zachová (CZE)
Middleweight (–70 kg)	Lara Cvjetko (CRO)	Szabina Gercsák (HUN)	Maria Portela (BRA)
Middleweight (–70 kg)	Lara Cvjetko (CRO)	Szabina Gercsák (HUN)	Ai Tsunoda (ESP)
Half-heavyweight (–78 kg)	Yoon Hyun-ji (KOR)	Alice Bellandi (ITA)	Lee Jeong-yun (KOR)
Half-heavyweight (–78 kg)	Yoon Hyun-ji (KOR)	Alice Bellandi (ITA)	Inbar Lanir (ISR)
Heavyweight (+78 kg)	Kim Ha-yun (KOR)	Stessie Bastareaud (FRA)	Marit Kamps (NED)
Heavyweight (+78 kg)	Kim Ha-yun (KOR)	Stessie Bastareaud (FRA)	Amarsaikhany Adiyaasüren (MGL)

== Prize money ==
The sums written are per medalist, bringing the total prizes awarded to €98,000. (retrieved from:)

Medal	Total	Judoka	Coach
Gold	€3,000	€2,400	€600
Silver	€2,000	€1,600	€400
Bronze	€1,000	€800	€200
