= Wakaba Tomita =

Japanese judoka (born 1997)

Personal information
- Born: 9 April 1997 (age 29)
- Occupation: Judoka

Sport
- Country: Japan
- Sport: Judo
- Weight class: +78 kg

Achievements and titles
- World Champ.: (2024)
- Asian Champ.: (bronze) (2023)
Medal record
Women's judo
Representing Japan
World Championships
Gold medal – first place	2021 Budapest	Mixed team
Gold medal – first place	2022 Tashkent	Mixed team
Gold medal – first place	2024 Abu Dhabi	+78 kg
Gold medal – first place	2024 Abu Dhabi	Mixed team
Silver medal – second place	2021 Budapest	+78 kg
Bronze medal – third place	2022 Tashkent	+78 kg
Asian Games
Gold medal – first place	2023 Hangzhou	Mixed team
Bronze medal – third place	2023 Hangzhou	+78 kg
IJF Grand Slam
Gold medal – first place	2022 Paris	+78 kg
Gold medal – first place	2022 Budapest	+78 kg
Gold medal – first place	2023 Tashkent	+78 kg
Gold medal – first place	2023 Ulaanbaatar	+78 kg
Bronze medal – third place	2025 Tokyo	+78 kg
IJF Grand Prix
Gold medal – first place	2019 Budapest	+78 kg
World Juniors Championships
Gold medal – first place	2015 Abu Dhabi	+78 kg
Asian Junior Championships
Silver medal – second place	2014 Hong Kong	+78 kg

Profile at external databases
- IJF: 28258
- JudoInside.com: 94129
- Updated on 11 December 2025

Wakaba Tomita (born 9 April 1997) is a Japanese judoka.

Tomita won a silver medal at the 2021 World Championships.

Tomita won the gold medal in her event at the 2022 Judo Grand Slam Paris held in Paris, France.
