= 2022 Judo Grand Slam Antalya =

Judo Competition

Judo 2022 Judo Grand Slam Antalya
- Venue: Antalya Sports Hall
- Location: Antalya, Turkey
- Dates: 1–3 April 2022
- Competitors: 525 from 63 nations
- Total prize money: 154,000€

Competition at external databases
- Links: IJF • EJU • JudoInside

The 2022 Judo Grand Slam Antalya was held in Antalya, Turkey, from 1–3 April 2022.

== Event videos ==
The event airs freely on the IJF YouTube channel.

	Weight classes	Preliminaries			Final Block
Day 1	Men: -60, -66 Women: -48, -52, -57	Commentated			Commentated
Day 1	Men: -60, -66 Women: -48, -52, -57	Tatami 1	Tatami 2	Tatami 3	Commentated
Day 2	Men: -73, -81 Women: -63, -70	Commentated			Commentated
Day 2	Men: -73, -81 Women: -63, -70	Tatami 1	Tatami 2	Tatami 3	Commentated
Day 3	Men: -90, -100, +100 Women: -78, +78	Commentated			
Day 3	Men: -90, -100, +100 Women: -78, +78	Tatami 1	Tatami 2	Tatami 3	

== Medal table ==
* Host nation (Turkey)

Rank	Nation	Gold	Silver	Bronze	Total
1	Georgia (GEO)	2	2	0	4
2	France (FRA)	2	1	4	7
3	Brazil (BRA)	1	1	3	5
4	Hungary (HUN)	1	1	1	3
5	Mongolia (MGL)	1	1	0	2
6	Cuba (CUB)	1	0	1	2
6	Moldova (MDA)	1	0	1	2
6	Portugal (POR)	1	0	1	2
9	Canada (CAN)	1	0	0	1
9	Chinese Taipei (TPE)	1	0	0	1
9	Germany (GER)	1	0	0	1
9	Great Britain (GBR)	1	0	0	1
13	Uzbekistan (UZB)	0	2	3	5
14	Spain (ESP)	0	1	3	4
15	Israel (ISR)	0	1	2	3
15	Netherlands (NED)	0	1	2	3
17	Austria (AUT)	0	1	1	2
17	Italy (ITA)	0	1	1	2
19	Turkey (TUR)*	0	1	0	1
20	Serbia (SRB)	0	0	2	2
21	Azerbaijan (AZE)	0	0	1	1
21	Belgium (BEL)	0	0	1	1
21	Tajikistan (TJK)	0	0	1	1
Totals (23 entries)		14	14	28	56

=== Men's events ===
Event	Gold	Silver	Bronze
Extra-lightweight (−60 kg)	Yang Yung-wei (TPE)	Lukhumi Chkhvimiani (GEO)	Francisco Garrigós (ESP)
Extra-lightweight (−60 kg)	Yang Yung-wei (TPE)	Lukhumi Chkhvimiani (GEO)	Dilshodbek Baratov (UZB)
Half-lightweight (−66 kg)	Denis Vieru (MDA)	Willian Lima (BRA)	Tal Flicker (ISR)
Half-lightweight (−66 kg)	Denis Vieru (MDA)	Willian Lima (BRA)	Sardor Nurillaev (UZB)
Lightweight (−73 kg)	Giorgi Terashvili (GEO)	Manuel Lombardo (ITA)	Salvador Cases Roca (ESP)
Lightweight (−73 kg)	Giorgi Terashvili (GEO)	Manuel Lombardo (ITA)	Petru Pelivan (MDA)
Half-middleweight (−81 kg)	Guilherme Schimidt (BRA)	Vedat Albayrak (TUR)	Abdul Malik Umayev (BEL)
Half-middleweight (−81 kg)	Guilherme Schimidt (BRA)	Vedat Albayrak (TUR)	Sharofiddin Boltaboev (UZB)
Middleweight (−90 kg)	Iván Felipe Silva Morales (CUB)	Luka Maisuradze (GEO)	Krisztián Tóth (HUN)
Middleweight (−90 kg)	Iván Felipe Silva Morales (CUB)	Luka Maisuradze (GEO)	Rafael Macedo (BRA)
Half-heavyweight (−100 kg)	Jorge Fonseca (POR)	Nikoloz Sherazadishvili (ESP)	Aleksandar Kukolj (SRB)
Half-heavyweight (−100 kg)	Jorge Fonseca (POR)	Nikoloz Sherazadishvili (ESP)	Elmar Gasimov (AZE)
Heavyweight (+100 kg)	Guram Tushishvili (GEO)	Alisher Yusupov (UZB)	Temur Rakhimov (TJK)
Heavyweight (+100 kg)	Guram Tushishvili (GEO)	Alisher Yusupov (UZB)	Andy Granda (CUB)

=== Women's events ===
Event	Gold	Silver	Bronze
Extra-lightweight (−48 kg)	Ganbaataryn Narantsetseg (MGL)	Bavuudorjiin Baasankhüü (MGL)	Mireia Lapuerta Comas (ESP)
Extra-lightweight (−48 kg)	Ganbaataryn Narantsetseg (MGL)	Bavuudorjiin Baasankhüü (MGL)	Milica Nikolić (SRB)
Half-lightweight (−52 kg)	Réka Pupp (HUN)	Diyora Keldiyorova (UZB)	Odette Giuffrida (ITA)
Half-lightweight (−52 kg)	Réka Pupp (HUN)	Diyora Keldiyorova (UZB)	Astride Gneto (FRA)
Lightweight (−57 kg)	Jessica Klimkait (CAN)	Sarah-Léonie Cysique (FRA)	Timna Nelson-Levy (ISR)
Lightweight (−57 kg)	Jessica Klimkait (CAN)	Sarah-Léonie Cysique (FRA)	Jéssica Lima (BRA)
Half-middleweight (−63 kg)	Lucy Renshall (GBR)	Szofi Özbas (HUN)	Bárbara Timo (POR)
Half-middleweight (−63 kg)	Lucy Renshall (GBR)	Szofi Özbas (HUN)	Magdalena Krssakova (AUT)
Middleweight (−70 kg)	Marie-Ève Gahié (FRA)	Bernadette Graf (AUT)	Maria Portela (BRA)
Middleweight (−70 kg)	Marie-Ève Gahié (FRA)	Bernadette Graf (AUT)	Margaux Pinot (FRA)
Half-heavyweight (−78 kg)	Anna-Maria Wagner (GER)	Guusje Steenhuis (NED)	Natascha Ausma (NED)
Half-heavyweight (−78 kg)	Anna-Maria Wagner (GER)	Guusje Steenhuis (NED)	Audrey Tcheuméo (FRA)
Heavyweight (+78 kg)	Léa Fontaine (FRA)	Raz Hershko (ISR)	Julia Tolofua (FRA)
Heavyweight (+78 kg)	Léa Fontaine (FRA)	Raz Hershko (ISR)	Marit Kamps (NED)

== Prize money ==
The sums written are per medalist, bringing the total prizes awarded to 154,000€. (retrieved from:)

Medal	Total	Judoka	Coach
Gold	5,000€	4,000€	1,000€
Silver	3,000€	2,400€	600€
Bronze	1,500€	1,200€	300€
