= Tang Jing (judoka) =

Chinese judoka (born 1995)

Tang Jing 唐婧
Personal information
- Born: 8 June 1995 (age 31)
- Occupation: Judoka

Sport
- Country: China
- Sport: Judo
- Weight class: ‍–‍63 kg

Achievements and titles
- Olympic Games: R16 (2024)
- World Champ.: R16 (2019)
- Asian Champ.: (silver) (2023)
Medal record
Women's judo
Representing China
Asian Games
Silver medal – second place	2023 Hangzhou	‍–‍63 kg
Bronze medal – third place	2018 Jakarta	‍–‍63 kg
Bronze medal – third place	2023 Hangzhou	Mixed team
Bronze medal – third place	2026 Aichi‑Nagoya	Mixed team
Asian Championships
Bronze medal – third place	2019 Fujairah	‍–‍63 kg
Bronze medal – third place	2022 Nur‑Sultan	‍–‍63 kg
IJF Grand Slam
Silver medal – second place	2023 Abu Dhabi	‍–‍63 kg
Bronze medal – third place	2021 Antalya	‍–‍63 kg
IJF Grand Prix
Gold medal – first place	2023 Perth	‍–‍63 kg
Silver medal – second place	2019 Antalya	‍–‍63 kg
Silver medal – second place	2019 Hohhot	‍–‍63 kg
Military World Games
Gold medal – first place	2019 Wuhan	‍–‍63 kg

Profile at external databases
- IJF: 42004
- JudoInside.com: 117832
- Updated on 30 July 2024

Tang Jing (Chinese: 唐婧; born 8 June 1995) is a Chinese judoka. She won one of the bronze medals in the women's 63 kg event at the 2018 Asian Games held in Jakarta, Indonesia.

== Career ==
In 2019, she won one of the bronze medals in the women's 63 kg event at the Asian-Pacific Judo Championships held in Fujairah, United Arab Emirates. A few months later, she competed in that event at the 2019 World Judo Championships held in Tokyo, Japan. In the women's 63 kg event at the 2019 Military World Games held in Wuhan, China, she won the gold medal.

In 2021, she won one of the bronze medals in her event at the Judo Grand Slam Antalya held in Antalya, Turkey.

In October 2026, she competed at the 2026 Asian Games. During the quarterfinals of the ‍–70 kg category against Rin Maeda of Japan, Tang bit Maeda and the referees declared a disqualification for Tang due to a biting foul just 1 minute and 12 seconds into the match.
