= Rinata Ilmatova =

Uzbekistani judoka (born 1999)

Personal information
- Born: 23 September 1999 (age 26)
- Occupation: Judoka

Sport
- Country: Uzbekistan
- Sport: Judo
- Weight class: +78 kg

Achievements and titles
- World Champ.: R32 (2021, 2023, 2024)
- Asian Champ.: 7th (2018, 2021)
Medal record
Women's judo
Representing Uzbekistan
World Championships
Bronze medal – third place	2021 Budapest	Mixed team
Asian Games
Silver medal – second place	2023 Hangzhou	Mixed team

Profile at external databases
- IJF: 39404
- JudoInside.com: 114409
- Updated on 24 May 2024

Rinata Ilmatova (born 23 September 1999) is an Uzbekistani judoka.

In 2018, Ilmatova competed in the women's +78 kg event at the 2018 Asian Games held in Jakarta, Indonesia. She also competed in the mixed team event.

At the 2021 World Judo Championships, Ilmatova won a medal in the mixed team event.
