= Julia Tolofua =

French judoka (born 1997)

Personal information
- Born: 1 June 1997 (age 29) Nice, France
- Occupation: Judoka
- Height: 1.86 m (6 ft 1 in)

Sport
- Country: France
- Sport: Judo
- Weight class: +78 kg
- Club: ACS Peugeot Mulhouse

Achievements and titles
- World Champ.: (silver) (2023)
- European Champ.: (silver) (2024)
Medal record
Women's judo
Representing France
World Championships
Silver medal – second place	2021 Budapest	Mixed team
Silver medal – second place	2022 Tashkent	Mixed team
Silver medal – second place	2023 Doha	+78 kg
Bronze medal – third place	2022 Tashkent	+78 kg
European Championships
Gold medal – first place	2022 Mulhouse	Mixed team
Gold medal – first place	2024 Zagreb	Mixed team
Silver medal – second place	2024 Zagreb	+78 kg
World Masters
Silver medal – second place	2023 Budapest	+78 kg
IJF Grand Slam
Gold medal – first place	2022 Tbilisi	+78 kg
Gold medal – first place	2024 Antalya	+78 kg
Silver medal – second place	2025 Astana	+78 kg
Silver medal – second place	2026 Paris	+78 kg
Bronze medal – third place	2019 Brasilia	+78 kg
Bronze medal – third place	2021 Paris	+78 kg
Bronze medal – third place	2022 Paris	+78 kg
Bronze medal – third place	2022 Tel Aviv	+78 kg
Bronze medal – third place	2022 Antalya	+78 kg
Bronze medal – third place	2023 Paris	+78 kg
Bronze medal – third place	2025 Tashkent	+78 kg
Bronze medal – third place	2025 Tbilisi	+78 kg
IJF Grand Prix
Gold medal – first place	2019 Tbilisi	+78 kg
Gold medal – first place	2021 Zagreb	+78 kg
European Junior Championships
Gold medal – first place	2016 Málaga	+78 kg
Military World Games
Silver medal – second place	2019 Wuhan	Women's team

Profile at external databases
- IJF: 22293
- JudoInside.com: 57052
- Updated on 9 February 2026

Julia Tolofua (born 1 June 1997) is a French judoka. She lived in several different places as a child as her father served in the French Foreign Legion. Two of her cousins and an uncle played rugby union at the highest level.

She won a medal at the 2021 World Judo Championships.

She won one of the bronze medals in her event at the 2022 Judo Grand Slam Paris held in Paris, France. She also won one of the bronze medals in her event at the 2022 Judo Grand Slam Tel Aviv held in Tel Aviv, Israel. She won one of the bronze medals in her event at the 2022 Judo Grand Slam Antalya held in Antalya, Turkey.

On 12 November 2022 she won a gold medal at the 2022 European Mixed Team Judo Championships as part of team France.

In May 2023, she won the silver medal at the 2023 World Judo Championships.
