= Diyora Keldiyorova =

Uzbekistani judoka (born 1998)

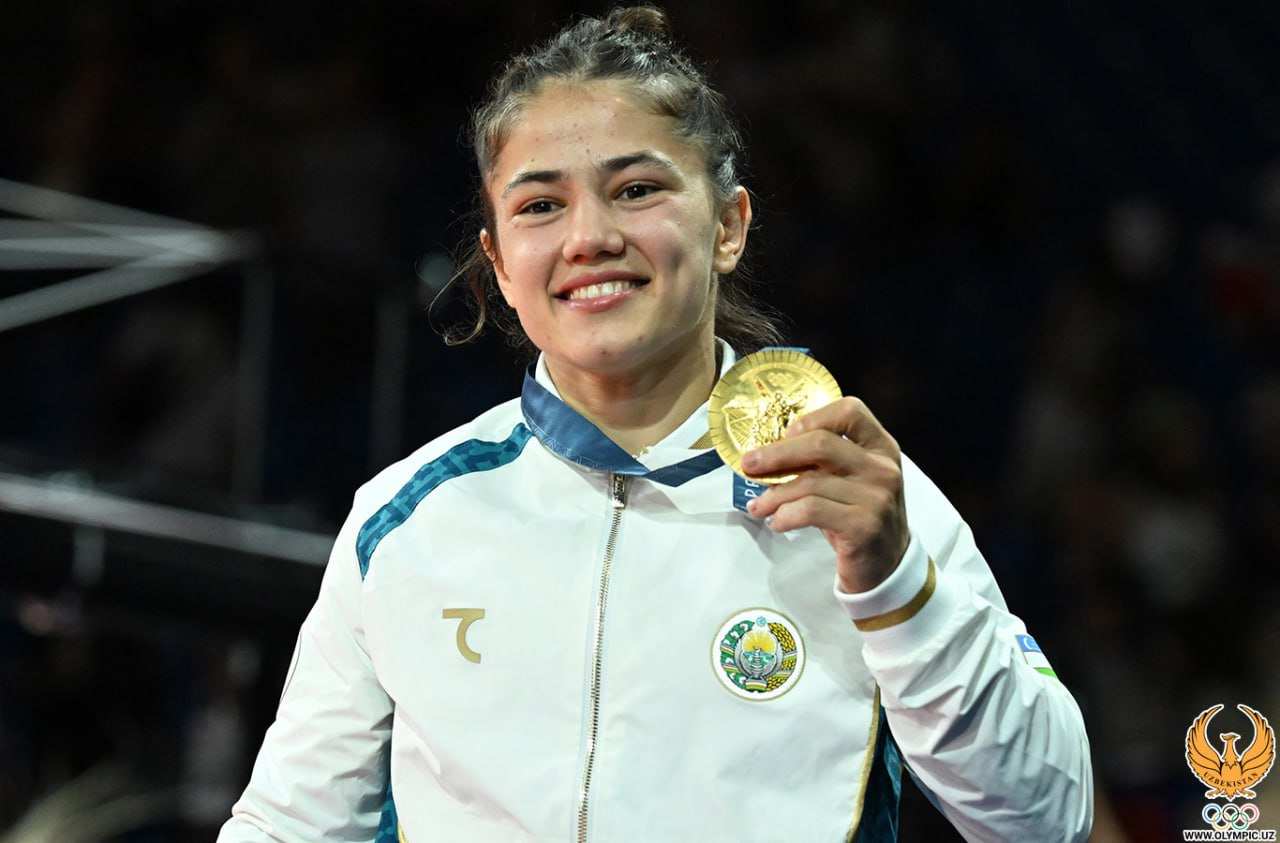
- Keldiyorova at the 2024 Summer Olympics

Personal information
- Born: 13 July 1998 (age 28) Juma, Uzbekistan
- Occupation: Judoka
- Spouse: Azamat Matyakubov (m. 2022)
- Children: 1

Sport
- Country: Uzbekistan
- Sport: Judo
- Weight class: ‍–‍52 kg

Achievements and titles
- Olympic Games: (gold) (2024)
- World Champ.: (silver) (2023, 2024)
- Asian Champ.: (gold) (2019, 2022, 2023)
- Highest world ranking: 1^{st}
Medal record
Women's judo
Representing Uzbekistan
Olympic Games
Gold medal – first place	2024 Paris	‍–‍52 kg
World Championships
Silver medal – second place	2023 Doha	‍–‍52 kg
Silver medal – second place	2024 Abu Dhabi	‍–‍52 kg
Bronze medal – third place	2021 Budapest	Mixed team
Asian Games
Gold medal – first place	2023 Hangzhou	‍–‍52 kg
Silver medal – second place	2023 Hangzhou	Mixed team
Asian Championships
Gold medal – first place	2019 Fujairah	‍–‍52 kg
Gold medal – first place	2022 Nur‑Sultan	‍–‍52 kg
Silver medal – second place	2021 Bishkek	‍–‍52 kg
Bronze medal – third place	2024 Hong Kong	‍–‍52 kg
World Masters
Bronze medal – third place	2019 Qingdao	‍–‍52 kg
Bronze medal – third place	2023 Budapest	‍–‍52 kg
IJF Grand Slam
Gold medal – first place	2021 Antalya	‍–‍52 kg
Gold medal – first place	2022 Ulaanbaatar	‍–‍52 kg
Gold medal – first place	2022 Baku	‍–‍52 kg
Gold medal – first place	2023 Tbilisi	‍–‍52 kg
Gold medal – first place	2024 Baku	‍–‍52 kg
Silver medal – second place	2022 Antalya	‍–‍52 kg
Silver medal – second place	2022 Abu Dhabi	‍–‍52 kg
Bronze medal – third place	2023 Ulaanbaatar	‍–‍52 kg
IJF Grand Prix
Gold medal – first place	2024 Odivelas	‍–‍52 kg
Silver medal – second place	2016 Tashkent	‍–‍52 kg
Bronze medal – third place	2026 Zagreb	‍–‍52 kg
Asian Junior Championships
Bronze medal – third place	2018 Beirut	‍–‍48 kg
World Cadets Championships
Gold medal – first place	2015 Sarajevo	‍–‍48 kg
Asian Youth Games
Bronze medal – third place	2013 Nanjing	‍–‍44 kg
Summer Universiade
Bronze medal – third place	2019 Naples	‍–‍52 kg
Military World Games
Bronze medal – third place	2019 Wuhan	‍–‍52 kg
Islamic Solidarity Games
Gold medal – first place	2021 Konya	‍–‍52 kg
Bronze medal – third place	2017 Baku	Women's team

Profile at external databases
- IJF: 17378
- JudoInside.com: 55574
- Updated on 15 November 2026

Diyora Keldiyorova (Uzbek: Diyora Baxtiyor qizi Keldiyorova; born 13 July 1998 in Juma, Samarkand Region) is an Olympic champion Uzbek judoka. She won the gold medal in the women's 52 kg event at the 2024 Summer Olympics held in Paris, France. She is also a two-time silver medalist in the women's 52 kg event at the World Judo Championships (2023 and 2024).

In 2019, she won the gold medal in her event at the Asian-Pacific Judo Championships held in Fujairah, United Arab Emirates.

She is the first Uzbek woman to win a Grand Slam tournament in judo. She is the first athlete in the history of Uzbekistan to win an Olympic gold in judo and also the first Uzbek woman athlete to win a gold medal at the Summer Olympics.

== Career ==
Keldiyorova won one of the bronze medals in the girls' 44 kg event at the 2013 Asian Youth Games held in Nanjing, China.

In 2018, Keldiyorova competed in the women's 48 kg event at the Asian Games in Jakarta, Indonesia. She entered into the repechage after losing her second match, against Ami Kondo of Japan, and she was then eliminated from the competition in her match against Jon Yu-sun of North Korea. At the 2019 Summer Universiade held in Naples, Italy, Keldiyorova won one of the bronze medals in the women's 52 kg event. In the women's 52 kg event at the 2019 Military World Games held in Wuhan, China she also won one of the bronze medals.

In 2019, Keldiyorova won one of the bronze medals in her event at the Judo World Masters held in Qingdao, China. In 2021, she competed in the women's 52 kg event at the Judo World Masters held in Doha, Qatar. A few months later, she won the gold medal in her event at the 2021 Judo Grand Slam Antalya held in Antalya, Turkey and the silver medal at the 2021 Asian-Pacific Judo Championships held in Bishkek, Kyrgyzstan. In June 2021, she lost her bronze medal match in the women's 52 kg event at the World Judo Championships held in Budapest, Hungary.

Keldiyorova lost her bronze medal match in her event at the 2022 Judo Grand Slam Tel Aviv held in Tel Aviv, Israel. She won the silver medal in her event at the 2022 Judo Grand Slam Antalya held in Antalya, Turkey.

Keldiyorova won the silver medal in the women's 52 kg event at the 2023 World Judo Championships held in Doha, Qatar. In 2024, she won a bronze medal at the Asian Judo Championships held in Hong Kong, China. Keldiyorova won the silver medal in the women's 52 kg event at the 2024 World Judo Championships held in Abu Dhabi, United Arab Emirates. She lost against Odette Giuffrida of Italy in her gold medal match. On July 28, 2024, at the Olympics in Paris, Diyora Keldiyorova in the 1/16 with a clear ippon 10:1 took revenge for the defeat in the Qatar final of 2023 to the Japanese Uta Abe. In the final, she defeated the Kosovar athlete Distria Krasniqi and became the Olympic champion and the first Uzbek woman to win a Summer Olympics gold medal.
