= Xu Shiyan =

Chinese judoka (born 1997)

Personal information
- Born: 15 March 1997 (age 29)
- Occupation: Judoka

Sport
- Country: China
- Sport: Judo
- Weight class: +78 kg

Achievements and titles
- Olympic Games: 5th (2020)
- World Champ.: 5th (2023, 2024)
- Asian Champ.: (gold) (2021)
Medal record
Women's judo
Representing China
Asian Games
| Silver medal – second place | 2023 Hangzhou | +78 kg |
| Bronze medal – third place | 2023 Hangzhou | Mixed team |
Asian Championships
| Gold medal – first place | 2021 Bishkek | +78 kg |
| Silver medal – second place | 2022 Nur‑Sultan | +78 kg |
World Masters
| Bronze medal – third place | 2023 Budapest | +78 kg |
IJF Grand Slam
| Gold medal – first place | 2021 Tbilisi | +78 kg |
| Gold medal – first place | 2023 Astana | +78 kg |
| Silver medal – second place | 2021 Antalya | +78 kg |
| Silver medal – second place | 2023 Tashkent | +78 kg |
| Bronze medal – third place | 2023 Tbilisi | +78 kg |
IJF Grand Prix
| Gold medal – first place | 2023 Perth | +78 kg |
| Bronze medal – third place | 2019 Hohhot | +78 kg |

Profile at external databases
- IJF: 41863
- JudoInside.com: 117101
- Updated on 24 May 2024

Xu Shiyan (born 15 March 1997) is a Chinese judoka. In 2021, Xu competed in the women's +78 kg event at the 2020 Summer Olympics in Tokyo, Japan.

Xu is the gold medallist of the 2021 Judo Grand Slam Tbilisi in the +78 kg category.
