= Amarsaikhany Adiyaasüren =

Mongolian judoka (born 2000)

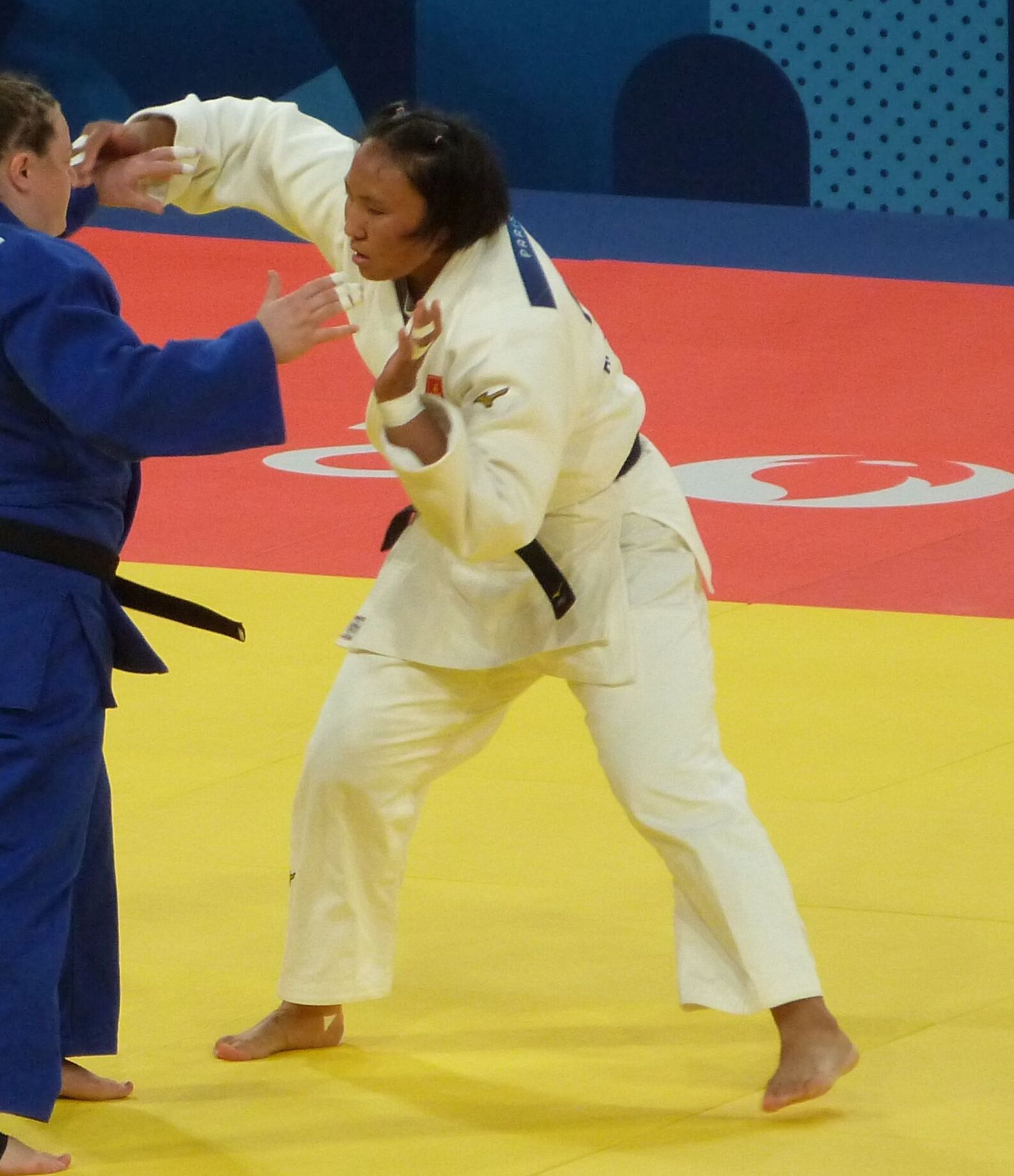
- Adiyasüren in 2024

Personal information
- Born: 26 March 2000 (age 26)
- Occupation: Judoka

Sport
- Country: Mongolia
- Sport: Judo
- Weight class: +78 kg

Achievements and titles
- Olympic Games: R16 (2024)
- World Champ.: R16 (2022, 2023)
- Asian Champ.: (silver) (2024)
Medal record
Women's judo
Representing Mongolia
Asian Games
Bronze medal – third place	2023 Hangzhou	+78 kg
Bronze medal – third place	2023 Hangzhou	Mixed team
Bronze medal – third place	2026 Aichi‑Nagoya	+78 kg
Asian Championships
Silver medal – second place	2024 Hong Kong	+78 kg
Bronze medal – third place	2025 Bangkok	+78 kg
Bronze medal – third place	2026 Ordos	+78 kg
IJF Grand Slam
Silver medal – second place	2021 Baku	+78 kg
Silver medal – second place	2022 Ulaanbaatar	+78 kg
Bronze medal – third place	2026 Astana	+78 kg
IJF Grand Prix
Bronze medal – third place	2022 Almada	+78 kg
Bronze medal – third place	2022 Zagreb	+78 kg
Bronze medal – third place	2023 Dushanbe	+78 kg
Asian Junior Championships
Silver medal – second place	2019 Taipei	+78 kg

Profile at external databases
- IJF: 54432
- JudoInside.com: 141594
- Updated on 2 October 2026

Amarsaikhany Adiyasüren (Mongolian: Амарсайханы Адъяасүрэн ᠠᠮᠤᠷᠰᠠᠶᠢᠬᠠᠨ ᠤ᠋ ᠠᠳᠢᠶᠠᠰᠦ᠋ᠷᠦᠩ; born 26 March 2000) is a Mongolian judoka.

== Career ==
Adiyasüren won bronze at the 2022 Asian Games in Hangzhou in the +78 kg category, defeating Tulika Maan by ippon in the bronze medal match.

Adiyasüren went on to win the silver medal in the +78 kg category at the 2024 Asian Championships in Hong Kong.

Adiyasüren was later selected to represent Mongolia at the 2024 Summer Olympics. Competing at the women's +78 kg event, she lost in the round of 16 to Kayra Özdemir.

In 2025, Adiyasüren appeared as a member of Team Mongolia on the Netflix competition series Physical: Asia, which premiered on 28 October 2025.

== Filmography ==
=== Web shows ===
Year	Title	Role	Notes	Ref.
2025	Physical: Asia	Contestant	Netflix	
