= Milica Žabić =

Serbian judoka (born 1994)

Personal information
- Born: 12 April 1994 (age 32)
- Occupation: Judoka

Sport
- Country: Serbia
- Sport: Judo, Sambo
- Weight class: +78 kg, ‍–‍78 kg
- Club: JK "Red Star" Belgrade

Achievements and titles
- Olympic Games: 5th (2024)
- World Champ.: R16 (2019, 2023, 2025)
- European Champ.: 7th (2020)
Medal record
Representing Serbia
Women's judo
European Championships
Bronze medal – third place	2024 Zagreb	Mixed team
IJF Grand Slam
Gold medal – first place	2022 Baku	+78 kg
Silver medal – second place	2023 Antalya	+78 kg
Bronze medal – third place	2023 Tel Aviv	+78 kg
Bronze medal – third place	2026 Tbilisi	‍–‍78 kg
IJF Grand Prix
Silver medal – second place	2022 Zagreb	+78 kg
Silver medal – second place	2023 Zagreb	+78 kg
Bronze medal – third place	2019 Tashkent	+78 kg
Bronze medal – third place	2023 Almada	+78 kg
Bronze medal – third place	2024 Linz	+78 kg
European Junior Championships
Gold medal – first place	2013 Sarajevo	+78 kg
Women's Sambo
World Junior Championships
Gold medal – first place	2014 Seoul	+80 kg

Profile at external databases
- IJF: 14607
- JudoInside.com: 56210
- Updated on 23 March 2026

Milica Žabić (Serbian Cyrillic: Милица Жабић; born 12 April 1994) is a Serbian judoka. She is the 2013 European Junior Champion in judo and 2014 World Junior Champion in sambo.

As part of mixed team, she won bronze medal at the 2024 European Championship. Žabić competed at the Paris 2024 Olympic Games in the +78 kg category, where she lost in the bronze medal match.

== Achievements ==
Year	Tournament	Place	Weight class
2020	European Championships	7th	+78 kg
2019	Grand Prix Tashkent	3rd	+78 kg
2014	World Junior Sambo Championships	1st	+80 kg
2013	European Junior Championships	1st	+78 kg
