= Beatriz Souza =

Brazilian judoka (born 1998)

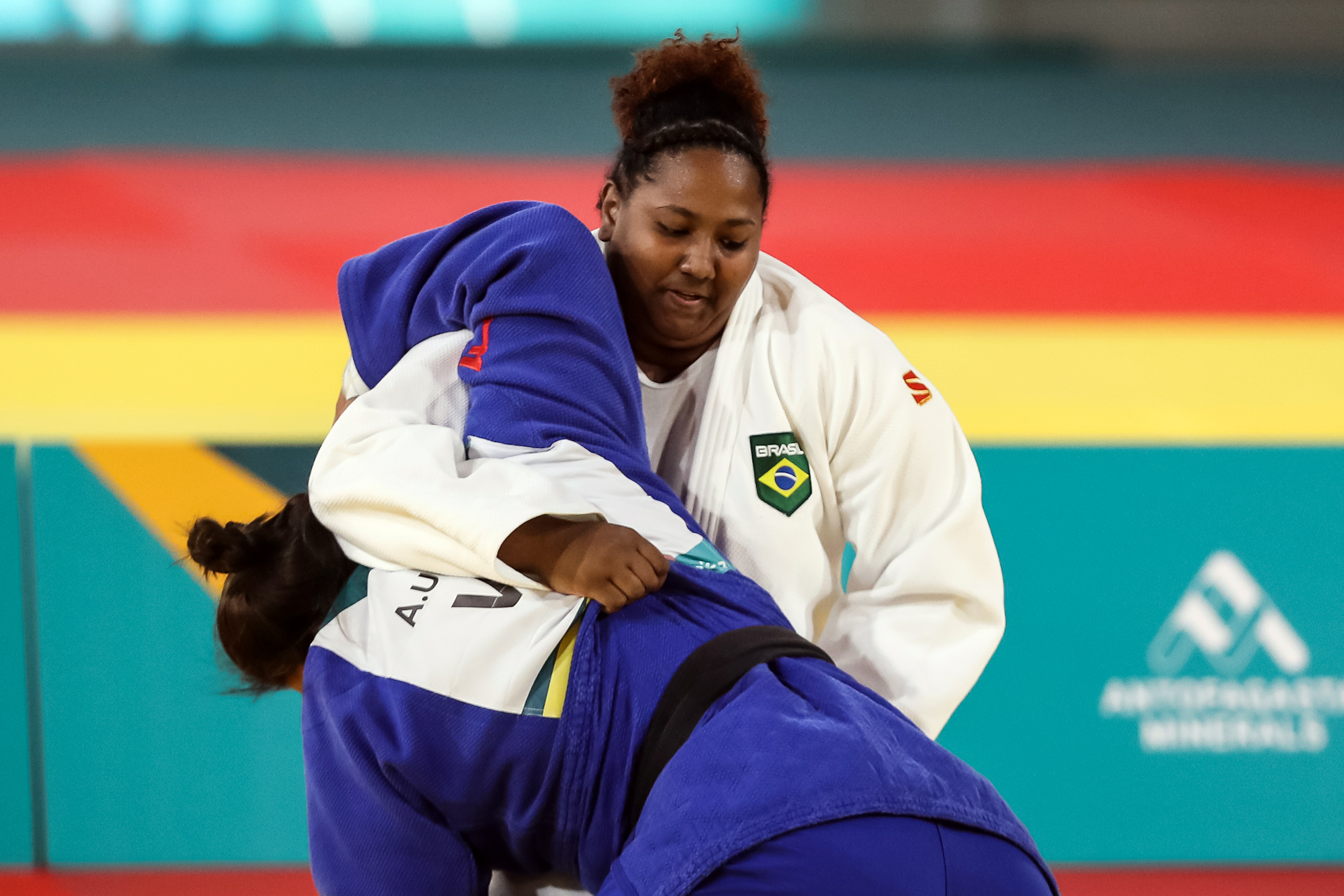
- Souza during the 2023 Pan American Games

Personal information
- Born: 20 May 1998 (age 28) Itariri, São Paulo, Brazil
- Occupation: Judoka
- Height: 176 cm (5 ft 9 in)
- Weight: 135.2 kg (298 lb)

Sport
- Country: Brazil
- Sport: Judo
- Weight class: +78 kg

Achievements and titles
- Olympic Games: (gold) (2024)
- World Champ.: (silver) (2022)
- Pan American Champ.: (gold) (2017, 2021, 2022, 2023, 2024, 2025)
- Highest world ranking: 1^{st}
Medal record
Women's judo
Representing Brazil
Olympic Games
Gold medal – first place	2024 Paris	+78 kg
Bronze medal – third place	2024 Paris	Mixed team
World Championships
Silver medal – second place	2017 Budapest	Mixed team
Silver medal – second place	2022 Tashkent	+78 kg
Bronze medal – third place	2019 Tokyo	Mixed team
Bronze medal – third place	2021 Budapest	+78 kg
Bronze medal – third place	2021 Budapest	Mixed team
Bronze medal – third place	2023 Doha	+78 kg
Pan American Games
Silver medal – second place	2023 Santiago	Mixed team
Bronze medal – third place	2019 Lima	+78 kg
Bronze medal – third place	2023 Santiago	+78 kg
Pan American Championships
Gold medal – first place	2017 Panama City	+78 kg
Gold medal – first place	2021 Guadalajara	+78 kg
Gold medal – first place	2022 Lima	+78 kg
Gold medal – first place	2023 Calgary	+78 kg
Gold medal – first place	2024 Rio de Janeiro	+78 kg
Gold medal – first place	2025 Santiago	+78 kg
Silver medal – second place	2018 San José	+78 kg
Silver medal – second place	2020 Guadalajara	+78 kg
Bronze medal – third place	2019 Lima	+78 kg
IJF Grand Slam
Gold medal – first place	2019 Brasilia	+78 kg
Gold medal – first place	2021 Abu Dhabi	+78 kg
Gold medal – first place	2023 Baku	+78 kg
Silver medal – second place	2021 Tashkent	+78 kg
Silver medal – second place	2022 Tel Aviv	+78 kg
Bronze medal – third place	2017 Abu Dhabi	+78 kg
Bronze medal – third place	2018 Ekaterinburg	+78 kg
Bronze medal – third place	2019 Osaka	+78 kg
Bronze medal – third place	2020 Paris	+78 kg
Bronze medal – third place	2020 Budapest	+78 kg
Bronze medal – third place	2021 Tbilisi	+78 kg
Bronze medal – third place	2021 Kazan	+78 kg
IJF Grand Prix
Gold medal – first place	2024 Linz	+78 kg
Gold medal – first place	2026 Lima	+78 kg
Gold medal – first place	2026 Zagreb	+78 kg
Silver medal – second place	2018 Tunis	+78 kg
Silver medal – second place	2019 Tbilisi	+78 kg
Silver medal – second place	2019 Antalya	+78 kg
Silver medal – second place	2023 Perth	+78 kg
Bronze medal – third place	2018 Cancún	+78 kg
World Juniors Championships
Silver medal – second place	2018 Nassau	+78 kg
Bronze medal – third place	2017 Zagreb	+78 kg
World Cadets Championships
Bronze medal – third place	2015 Sarajevo	+70 kg

Profile at external databases
- IJF: 23953
- JudoInside.com: 38156
- Updated on 15 November 2026

Beatriz Rodrigues de Souza (Brazilian Portuguese pronunciation: [beaˈtɾiz ʁoˈdɾiɡiz dʒi ˈsowzɐ]; born 20 May 1998) is a Brazilian judoka. She represented Brazil at the 2024 Summer Olympics and won the gold medal in the Women's +78 kg competition.

== Early life ==
Souza was born on 20 May 1998 in Itariri, São Paulo, daughter of the military veteran and ex-judoka Poscedonio José de Souza Neto. She was raised in the coastal town of Peruíbe.

== Career ==
Her first medal was at the 2017 Pan American Championships, held in Panama City.

Souza won a medal at the 2019 World Judo Championships.

Souza won the silver medal in her event at the 2022 Judo Grand Slam Tel Aviv held in Tel Aviv, Israel.

In the 2024 Summer Olympics, she defeated Raz Hershko, winning Brazil's first gold medal in the Women's over 78 kg category, with Sarah Menezes as her coach, becoming the first ever woman athlete from the Esporte Clube Pinheiros club to be crowned champion in all Olympic Games history.
