= Iriskhon Kurbanbaeva =

Uzbekistani judoka (born 2002)

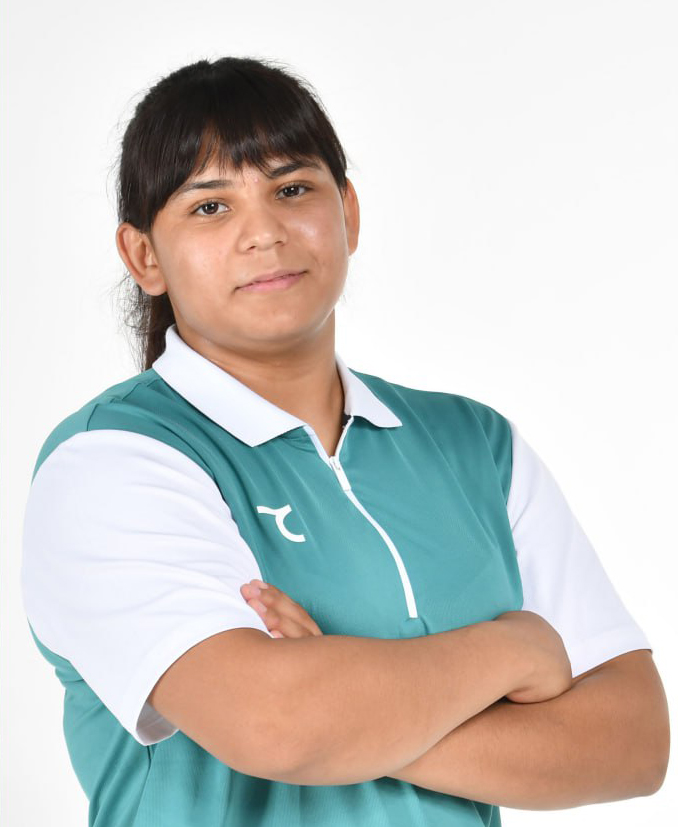

Personal information
- Born: 18 March 2002 (age 24)
- Occupation: Judoka

Sport
- Country: Uzbekistan
- Sport: Judo
- Weight class: ‍–‍78 kg

Achievements and titles
- Olympic Games: R16 (2024)
- World Champ.: 7th (2024)
- Asian Champ.: (bronze) (2023)
Medal record
Women's judo
Representing Uzbekistan
World Championships
| Bronze medal – third place | 2021 Budapest | Mixed team |
| Bronze medal – third place | 2026 Baku | Mixed team |
Asian Games
| Silver medal – second place | 2023 Hangzhou | Mixed team |
| Bronze medal – third place | 2023 Hangzhou | ‍–‍78 kg |
| Bronze medal – third place | 2026 Aichi‑Nagoya | Mixed team |
World Juniors Championships
| Bronze medal – third place | 2022 Guayaquil | ‍–‍78 kg |
Islamic Solidarity Games
| Silver medal – second place | 2025 Riyadh | +78 kg |
| Silver medal – second place | 2025 Riyadh | Mixed team |

Profile at external databases
- IJF: 39383
- JudoInside.com: 114516
- Updated on 3 August 2024

Iriskhon Kurbanbaeva (born 18 March 2002) is an Uzbekistani judoka.

Kurbanbaeva won a medal at the 2021 World Judo Championships.
