= Marit Kamps =

Dutch judoka (born 2001)

Personal information
- Nationality: Dutch
- Born: 4 March 2001 (age 25)
- Occupation: Judoka

Sport
- Country: Netherlands
- Sport: Judo
- Weight class: +78 kg, ‍–‍78 kg

Achievements and titles
- Olympic Games: R16 (2024)
- World Champ.: 5th (2025)
- European Champ.: (bronze) (2023)
Medal record
Women's judo
Representing the Netherlands
European Games
Bronze medal – third place	2023 Kraków	Mixed team
European Championships
Silver medal – second place	2022 Mulhouse	Mixed team
Bronze medal – third place	2023 Montpellier	+78 kg
IJF Grand Slam
Silver medal – second place	2023 Astana	+78 kg
Bronze medal – third place	2022 Antalya	+78 kg
Bronze medal – third place	2022 Tbilisi	+78 kg
Bronze medal – third place	2024 Baku	+78 kg
Bronze medal – third place	2025 Baku	+78 kg
Bronze medal – third place	2025 Tbilisi	+78 kg
Bronze medal – third place	2026 Dushanbe	‍–‍78 kg
IJF Grand Prix
Silver medal – second place	2024 Linz	+78 kg
Bronze medal – third place	2022 Almada	+78 kg
World Juniors Championships
Silver medal – second place	2021 Olbia	+78 kg
Bronze medal – third place	2019 Marrakesh	+78 kg
European Junior Championships
Silver medal – second place	2020 Poreč	+78 kg
Bronze medal – third place	2019 Vantaa	+78 kg
Bronze medal – third place	2021 Luxembourg	+78 kg
European Cadet Championships
Silver medal – second place	2018 Sarajevo	+70 kg
Bronze medal – third place	2017 Kaunas	+70 kg

Profile at external databases
- IJF: 29374
- JudoInside.com: 94582
- Updated on 3 May 2026

Marit Kamps (born 4 March 2001) is a Dutch judoka.

Kamps is a bronze medalist from the 2022 Judo Grand Prix Almada in the +78 kg category. She won one of the bronze medals in her event at the 2022 Judo Grand Slam Antalya held in Antalya, Turkey.

On 12 November 2022 Kamps won a silver medal at the 2022 European Mixed Team Judo Championships as part of team Netherlands.
