= Tulika Maan =

Indian judoka (born 1998)

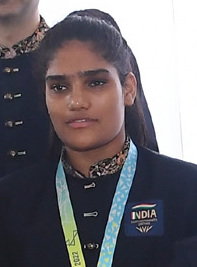
- Maan in August 2022

Personal information
- Born: 9 September 1998 (age 28) Delhi, India
- Occupation: Judoka

Sport
- Country: India
- Sport: Judo
- Weight class: +78 kg
- Coached by: Yashpal Solanki

Achievements and titles
- Olympic Games: R32 (2024)
- World Champ.: R16 (2022, 2024)
- Asian Champ.: 7th (2017, 2019)
- Commonwealth Games: (silver) (2022)
Medal record
Women's judo
Representing India
Commonwealth Games
Silver medal – second place	2022 Birmingham	+78 kg
South Asian Games
Gold medal – first place	2019 Kathmandu	+78 kg
Asian Junior Championships
Bronze medal – third place	2017 Bishkek	+78 kg
Bronze medal – third place	2018 Beirut	+78 kg

Profile at external databases
- IJF: 38715
- JudoInside.com: 114927
- Updated on 3 August 2024

Tulika Maan (born 9 September 1998) is an Indian judoka. She competes in the +78 kg weight class and won the silver medal at the 2022 Commonwealth Games.

In 2022, Maan was ranked No. 91 in the Judo World Rankings.

== Personal life ==
Maan is from Delhi, India.

== Achievements ==
Tulika Maan has received the following accolades throughout her career:

- Silver medallist at national junior level.
- 2018: Winner of the Commonwealth Championship in Jaipur.
- 2017: Debuted at the Budapest World Championship and participated in the Tokyo World Championship.
- 2019: Winner of the Walsall Commonwealth Championship; Gold medallist at South Asian Games and Commonwealth Championship.
- 2022: Silver medallist in Commonwealth Games.
- 2023: Bronze medallist at the Asian Open Championship in Taipei.
