= Kim Ha-yun (judoka) =

South Korean judoka (born 2000)

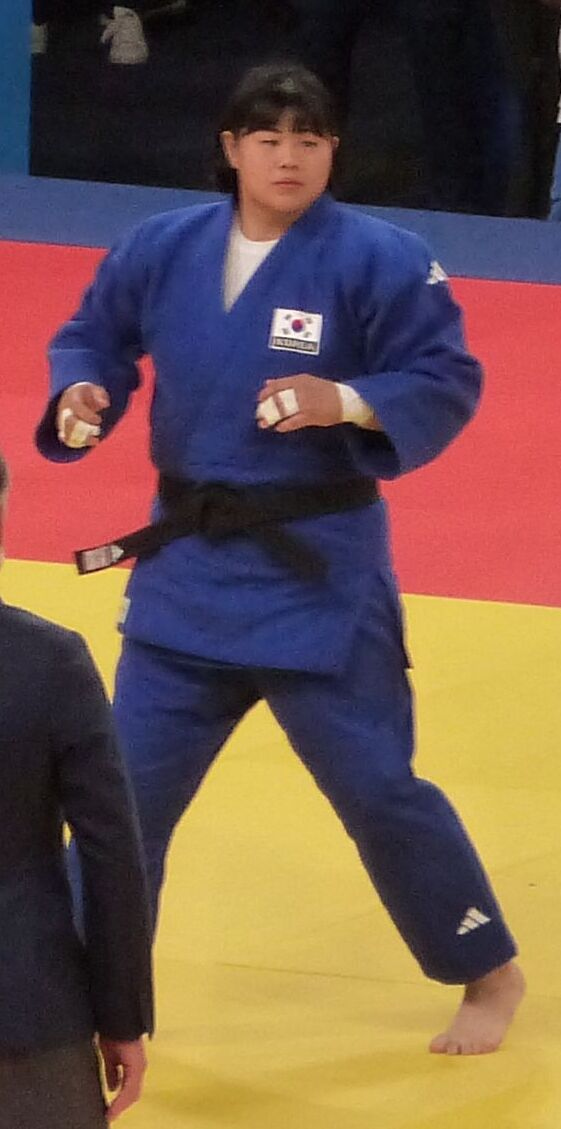

Personal information
- Born: 7 January 2000 (age 26) Busan, South Korea
- Occupation: Judoka

Korean name
- Hangul: 김하윤
- RR: Gim Hayun
- MR: Kim Hayun

Sport
- Country: South Korea
- Sport: Judo
- Weight class: +78 kg

Achievements and titles
- Olympic Games: (bronze) (2024)
- World Champ.: (gold) (2025)
- Asian Champ.: (gold) (2023)
Medal record
Women's judo
Representing South Korea
Olympic Games
| Bronze medal – third place | 2024 Paris | +78 kg |
| Bronze medal – third place | 2024 Paris | Mixed team |
World Championships
| Gold medal – first place | 2025 Budapest | +78 kg |
| Silver medal – second place | 2025 Budapest | Mixed team |
| Bronze medal – third place | 2024 Abu Dhabi | +78 kg |
Asian Games
| Gold medal – first place | 2023 Hangzhou | +78 kg |
Asian Championships
| Bronze medal – third place | 2021 Bishkek | +78 kg |
| Bronze medal – third place | 2022 Nur‑Sultan | +78 kg |
World Masters
| Bronze medal – third place | 2019 Qingdao | +78 kg |
| Bronze medal – third place | 2023 Budapest | +78 kg |
IJF Grand Slam
| Gold medal – first place | 2023 Paris | +78 kg |
| Silver medal – second place | 2025 Tokyo | +78 kg |
| Bronze medal – third place | 2018 Düsseldorf | +78 kg |
| Bronze medal – third place | 2021 Tashkent | +78 kg |
| Bronze medal – third place | 2022 Paris | +78 kg |
| Bronze medal – third place | 2022 Ulaanbaatar | +78 kg |
| Bronze medal – third place | 2022 Tokyo | +78 kg |
| Bronze medal – third place | 2023 Ulaanbaatar | +78 kg |
IJF Grand Prix
| Gold medal – first place | 2022 Almada | +78 kg |
| Gold medal – first place | 2023 Almada | +78 kg |
| Silver medal – second place | 2019 Tashkent | +78 kg |
World University Games
| Gold medal – first place | 2025 Rhine-Ruhr | +78 kg |
| Bronze medal – third place | 2025 Rhine-Ruhr | Mixed team |
World Juniors Championships
| Silver medal – second place | 2019 Marrakesh | +78 kg |
Asian Junior Championships
| Gold medal – first place | 2018 Beirut | +78 kg |
Asian Cadet Championships
| Gold medal – first place | 2017 Bishkek | +70 kg |
| Silver medal – second place | 2016 Kochi | +70 kg |

Profile at external databases
- IJF: 34577
- JudoInside.com: 108893
- Updated on 11 December 2025

Kim Ha-yun (born 7 January 2000) is a South Korean judoka who competes in the +78 kg category.

== Career ==
Kim attends the Korea National Sport University in Seoul. She is the bronze medallist of the 2019 Judo World Masters in Qingdao and the 2021 Judo Grand Slam Tashkent.

Kim won one of the bronze medals in her event at the 2022 Judo Grand Slam Paris held in Paris, France.
