= Judo at the 2025 Summer World University Games – Women's 57 kg =

Women's 57 kg at the 2025 Summer World University Games
- Venue: Messe Essen
- Location: Essen
- Dates: 23 July
- Competitors: 22

Medalists
gold medal	Huh Mi-mi	South Korea
silver medal	Róza Gyertyás	Hungary
bronze medal	Shukurjon Aminova	Uzbekistan
bronze medal	Moa Ono	Japan

The women's 57 kg at the 2025 Summer World University Games in Rhine-Ruhr, Germany was held 23 July 2025. Huh Mi-mi of South Korea captured the gold medal. Róza Gyertyás of Hungary took home the silver medal. The bronze medals were awarded to Shukurjon Aminova of Uzbekistan and Moa Ono of Japan.

== Schedule ==
All times are Central European Time (UTC+1)

Date	Time	Event
23 July 2015	09:00	Preliminary Rounds
23 July 2015	17:00	Final Block

== Results ==
Athletes advanced through direct knockout rounds—including the round of 32, round of 16, quarterfinals, and semifinals—to determine the two finalists fighting for the gold and silver medals. Parallel to the main bracket, a repechage system allowed defeated quarterfinalists to work their way back into the tournament, culminating in two separate bronze medal matches where the repechage winners faced the losing semifinalists.

Round of 32
M Torro (USA)	000
A Martín (ESP)	100
Z de Jong (NED)	000
Lin Wt (TPE)	110
G Carnà (ITA)	100
Rupanshi (IND)	000
T Tsogjargal (MGL)	000 (yellow card)
N Perovnik (SLO)	100
J Étienne (HAI)	000
V Laiho (FIN)	010 (yellow card)
L Göbel (GER)	000
R Gyertyás (HUN)	100

Round of 16
Huh Mm (KOR)	001
A Martín (ESP)	000
L Kallinger (AUT)	101
Lin Wt (TPE)	000
B Comanche (BRA)	000
G Carnà (ITA)	010
M Ono (JPN)	021 (yellow card)
D Mukhanbet (KAZ)	001
S Aminova (UZB)	101
N Perovnik (SLO)	000
C Devictor (FRA)	021
V Laiho (FIN)	001
N Loladze (GEO)	000
R Gyertyás (HUN)	101 (yellow card)
K Siennicka (POL)	020
I Shynkarenko (UKR)	001

Quarter-finals
Huh Mm (KOR)	100
L Kallinger (AUT)	000 (yellow card)
G Carnà (ITA)	000
M Ono (JPN)	100 (yellow card)
S Aminova (UZB)	100 (yellow card)
C Devictor (FRA)	000
R Gyertyás (HUN)	100 (yellow card)
K Siennicka (POL)	000

Semi-finals
Huh Mm (KOR)	001 (yellow card)
M Ono (JPN)	000
S Aminova (UZB)	001
R Gyertyás (HUN)	100

Final
Huh Mm (KOR)	021
R Gyertyás (HUN)	000 (yellow card)

Repechage Phases

Repechage
L Kallinger (AUT)	000
G Carnà (ITA)	100
C Devictor (FRA)	000
K Siennicka (POL)	101

Bronze medal
G Carnà (ITA)	000
S Aminova (UZB)	100
K Siennicka (POL)	000
M Ono (JPN)	010
