= Judo at the 2026 Asian Games – Women's 57 kg =

Judo competition

Judo Women's 57 kg at the 2026 Asian Games
- Venue: Aichi International Arena
- Location: Nagoya, Japan
- Competitors: 16 from 16 nations

Medalists
gold medal	Huh Mi-mi	South Korea
silver medal	Terbishiin Ariunzayaa	Mongolia
bronze medal	Mio Shirakane	Japan
bronze medal	Kim Hyon-a	North Korea

The women's 57 kilograms (lightweight) competition in Judo at the 2026 Asian Games was held on 1 October 2026 at the Aichi International Arena in Nagoya, Japan. The event was competed by 16 competitors from 16 nations. Huh Mi-mi of South Korea won the gold medal after defeating Terbishiin Ariunzayaa of Mongolia in the final. Mio Shirakane of Japan and Kim Hyon-a of North Korea won the bronze medals.

== Background ==
Judo was first introduced in the Asian Games at the 1986 edition.

Chinese Taipei's Chen-Ling Lien was the defending champion, having won the gold medal in the same event at the 2022 Asian Games in Hangzhou. Japan's Momo Tamaoki won the silver medal, while Turkmenistan's Maysa Pardayeva and South Korea's Park Eun-song won the bronze medals. Of the medal winners at the previous Asian Games, none of them returned to compete at the 2026 Asian Games.

South Korea's Mi-mi Huh was the silver medalist in the women's 57 kg category at the 2024 Summer Olympics. She had also won the gold medal at the 2024 World Judo Championships. North Korea's Kim Hyon-a won the gold medal at the 2026 Asian Judo Championships in the women's 57 kg category, defeating Mongolia's Terbishiin Ariunzayaa, who won the silver medal. Terbishiin had also won the silver medal at the 2025 Asian Judo Championships and a gold medal at the 2024 World Judo Championships in the cadets category.

Other competitors included Japan's Mio Shirakane, who won the gold medal at the 2025 World Judo Championships in the junior women's 57 kg category, Uzbekistan's Shukurjon Aminova, who had won the bronze medal at the 2025 Asian Judo Championships and finished seventh at the 2022 Asian Games, and India's Yamini Mourya, who had won a bronze medal at the 2016 Asian Judo Championships in the junior category and a silver medal at the 2026 Commonwealth Games, and Kazakhstan's Dana Abdirova, who won the silver medal at the 2025 World Judo Championships in the junior category.

== Schedule ==
The men's judo 66 kg event was held on 30 September 2026 held at the Aichi International Arena in Nagoya.

All times are Japan Standard Time (UTC+09:00)

Date	Time	Event
Thursday, 1 October 2026	11:00	Elimination round of 16
Thursday, 1 October 2026	11:00	Quarterfinals
Thursday, 1 October 2026	11:00	Repechage
Thursday, 1 October 2026	11:00	Semifinals
Thursday, 1 October 2026	17:00	Finals

== Format ==
The individual judo competition was competed as a single-elimination tournament. The competitors were divided into two halves with the winner of each match advancing to the next match. The winners of the semifinals of the two halves competed against each other for the gold and silver medals. Each judoka who loses to one of the two finalists moves into the repechage rounds, which is used to determine the bronze medals. The losers of the semifinals compete against the remaining repechage opponent from their half of the bracket in the bronze medal bout. The outcome of each match is determined by the score with points given to various techniques such as ippon, waza-ari, and yuko, and penalties.

== Summary ==
The event was competed by 16 competitors from 16 nations.

Terbishiin defeated Thailand's Kamolwan Akkajan in the round of 16 and in the quarterfinals, she defeated Mourya by scoring a yuko. In the semifinals, she overcame North Korea's Kim by scoring another yuko to qualify for the final. The other finalist was Mi-mi, who defeated Philippines' Joemari-Heart Rafael in the round of 16 before defeating China's Tao Yuying in the quarterfinals by a ippon. In the semifinals, she won against Aminova after Aminova received three shido penalties, resulting in hansoku-make.

In the final, Mi-mi defeated Terbishiin by a yuko to win the gold medal. Huh scored the yuko with a throw down just 12 seconds after the contest began. Despite receiving a shido penalty later in the match, she held her lead to win the match. Japan's Mio Shirakane and North Korea's Kim Hyon A won the two bronze medals. Shirakane defeated Aminova in the bronze-medal contest by scoring a yuko in golden score. The bronze-medal contest also went to golden score with Kim defeated Abdirova by a yuko to win the match.

== Results ==
=== Main bracket ===
==== Final ====
Final
Terbishiin Ariunzayaa (MGL)	000
Huh Mi-mi (KOR)	001 (yellow card)

==== Top half ====
Round of 16
Terbishiin Ariunzayaa (MGL)	101
Kamolwan Akkajan (THA)	000 (yellow card)
Yamini Mourya (IND)	100
Fatena Bu-Qahoos (QAT)	000
Mio Shirakane (JPN)	100
Dinny Febriany (INA)	000
Kim Hyon-a (PRK)	010 (yellow card)
Yeung Nok Lam (HKG)	000 (yellow card)

Quarter-finals
Terbishiin Ariunzayaa (MGL)	002
Yamini Mourya (IND)	000 (yellow card)
Mio Shirakane (JPN)	000 (yellow card)
Kim Hyon-a (PRK)	001

Semi-finals
Terbishiin Ariunzayaa (MGL)	001 (yellow card)
Kim Hyon-a (PRK)	000 (yellow card)

==== Bottom half ====
Round of 16
Shukurjon Aminova (UZB)	100 (yellow card)
Zhanar Zholdosheva (KGZ)	000
Dana Abdirova (KAZ)	001
Liu Tzu-yun (TPE)	000
Tao Yuying (CHN)	100
Samira Khakkhah (IRI)	000
Huh Mi-mi (KOR)	100
Joemari-Heart Rafael (PHI)	000

Quarter-finals
Shukurjon Aminova (UZB)	100
Dana Abdirova (KAZ)	000
Tao Yuying (CHN)	000
Huh Mi-mi (KOR)	100

Semi-finals
Shukurjon Aminova (UZB)	000
Huh Mi-mi (KOR)	100 (yellow card)

=== Repechage ===
Repechage
Yamini Mourya (IND)	000
Mio Shirakane (JPN)	100
Dana Abdirova (KAZ)	001
Tao Yuying (CHN)	000

Bronze medal
Mio Shirakane (JPN)	001
Shukurjon Aminova (UZB)	000
Dana Abdirova (KAZ)	000 (yellow card)
Kim Hyon-a (PRK)	001
