= Yuta Nakamura (judoka) =

Japanese judoka (born 2002)

Personal information
- Born: 12 July 2002 (age 24)
- Occupation: Judoka

Sport
- Country: Japan
- Sport: Judo
- Weight class: +100 kg

Achievements and titles
- Asian Champ.: 5th (2025)
Medal record
Men's judo
Representing Japan
World Championships
Gold medal – first place	2026 Baku	Mixed team
Asian Games
Gold medal – first place	2026 Aichi‑Nagoya	Mixed team
Asian Championships
Gold medal – first place	2025 Bangkok	Mixed team
IJF Grand Slam
Bronze medal – third place	2024 Tokyo	+100 kg
Bronze medal – third place	2025 Paris	+100 kg
IJF Grand Prix
Silver medal – second place	2022 Almada	+100 kg
World Juniors Championships
Gold medal – first place	2022 Guayaquil	+100 kg
World University Games
Gold medal – first place	2021 Chengdu	Men's team
Gold medal – first place	2025 Essen	+100 kg
Gold medal – first place	2025 Essen	Mixed team
Silver medal – second place	2021 Chengdu	+100 kg

Profile at external databases
- IJF: 65946
- JudoInside.com: 142425
- Updated on 12 October 2026

Yuta Nakamura (中村雄太, Nakamura Yuta; born 12 July 2002) is a Japanese judoka.

== Career ==
In August 2022, Nakamura competed at the 2022 World Judo Juniors Championships and won a gold medal in the +100 kg category. He also helped Japan win a gold medal in the mixed team event.

He represented Japan at the 2021 Summer World University Games, which were postponed until 2023, and won a gold medal in the men's team event. He also won a silver medal in the +100 kg category, losing to South Korea's Kim Min-jong in the final.

In April 2025, he competed at the 2025 Asian Judo Championships and won a gold medal in the mixed team event. In July 2025, he competed at the 2025 Summer World University Games and won a gold medal in the +100 kg category. He also won a gold medal in the mixed team event.

On 3 October 2026, he represented Japan at the 2026 Asian Games and won a gold medal in the mixed team event. A week later he competed at the 2026 World Judo Championships and helped Japan win a gold medal in the mixed team event. This was Japan's eighth gold medal in the event at the World Judo Championships and first since 2024.
