= Judo at the 2025 Summer World University Games – Men's +100 kg =

Men's +100 kg at the 2025 Summer World University Games
- Venue: Messe Essen
- Location: Essen
- Dates: 25 July
- Competitors: 25

Medalists
gold medal	Yuta Nakamura	Japan
silver medal	Saba Inaneishvili	Georgia
bronze medal	Giannis Antoniou	Cyprus
bronze medal	Valerii Endovitskii	Individual Neutral Athletes

The men's +100 kg at the 2025 Summer World University Games in Rhine-Ruhr, Germany was held 25 July 2025. Yuta Nakamura of Japan captured the gold medal. Saba Inaneishvili of Georgia took home the silver medal. The bronze medals were awarded to Giannis Antoniou of Cyprus and Valerii Endovitskii of Individual Neutral Athletes.

== Schedule ==
All times are Central European Time (UTC+1)

Date	Time	Event
25 July 2015	10:00	Preliminary Rounds
25 July 2015	17:00	Final Block

== Results ==
Athletes advanced through direct knockout rounds—including the round of 32, round of 16, quarterfinals, and semifinals—to determine the two finalists fighting for the gold and silver medals. Parallel to the main bracket, a repechage system allowed defeated quarterfinalists to work their way back into the tournament, culminating in two separate bronze medal matches where the repechage winners faced the losing semifinalists.

Round of 32
D Korevaar (NED)	021
J Sordyl (POL)	000
M Belz (GER)	100
A Williams (USA)	000
D Diezma (ESP)	102
C Córdoba (MEX)	000
M Okekwukwu (NGR)	000 (yellow card)
T Tutar (TUR)	100 (yellow card)
Z Nurtilepuly (KAZ)	001
D Nazaré (BRA)	000 (yellow card)
R Ahmadov (AZE)	101
A Bagrin (MDA)	010
I Ravshankulov (UZB)	010
J Balogh (HUN)	000 (yellow card)
G Bertalanič Žižek (SLO)	000
A Gustan (FRA)	101
Y Ghangas (IND)	000
Dai Ym (TPE)	100 (yellow card)

Round of 16
V Endovitskii (AIN)	100
D Korevaar (NED)	000
M Belz (GER)	020
D Diezma (ESP)	000
G Antoniou (CYP)	020
T Tutar (TUR)	000 (yellow card)
Y Nakamura (JPN)	100
Z Nurtilepuly (KAZ)	000
S Inaneishvili (GEO)	101 (yellow card)
R Ahmadov (AZE)	000
Song Wh (KOR)	000
I Ravshankulov (UZB)	100
Y Balyevskyy (UKR)	021 (yellow card)
A Gustan (FRA)	010
E Zholdoshkaziev (KGZ)	020 (yellow card)
Dai Ym (TPE)	000 (yellow card)

Quarter-finals
V Endovitskii (AIN)	100 (yellow card)
M Belz (GER)	000 (yellow card)
G Antoniou (CYP)	000
Y Nakamura (JPN)	001
S Inaneishvili (GEO)	100
I Ravshankulov (UZB)	000
Y Balyevskyy (UKR)	001 (yellow card)
E Zholdoshkaziev (KGZ)	000

Semi-finals
V Endovitskii (AIN)	000
Y Nakamura (JPN)	010
S Inaneishvili (GEO)	100 (yellow card)
Y Balyevskyy (UKR)	000

Final
Y Nakamura (JPN)	101
S Inaneishvili (GEO)	000 (yellow card)

Repechage Phases

Repechage
M Belz (GER)	000 (yellow card)
G Antoniou (CYP)	001 (yellow card)
I Ravshankulov (UZB)	110
E Zholdoshkaziev (KGZ)	000

Bronze medal
G Antoniou (CYP)	100 (yellow card)
Y Balyevskyy (UKR)	000 (yellow card)
I Ravshankulov (UZB)	001
V Endovitskii (AIN)	010
