= Mizuki Sugimura =

Japanese judoka (born 2003)

Personal information
- Born: 20 November 2003 (age 22)
- Occupation: Judoka

Sport
- Country: Japan
- Sport: Judo
- Weight class: ‍–‍78 kg
Medal record
Women's judo
Representing Japan
Asian Games
Gold medal – first place	2026 Aichi‑Nagoya	‍–‍78 kg
Gold medal – first place	2026 Aichi‑Nagoya	Mixed team
IJF Grand Slam
Bronze medal – third place	2025 Abu Dhabi	‍–‍78 kg
IJF Grand Prix
Silver medal – second place	2026 Qingdao	‍–‍78 kg
World University Games
Gold medal – first place	2021 Chengdu	‍–‍78 kg
Gold medal – first place	2021 Chengdu	Women's team
Gold medal – first place	2025 Rhine‑Ruhr	Mixed team

Profile at external databases
- IJF: 75212
- JudoInside.com: 151246
- Updated on 4 October 2026

Mizuki Sugimura (杉村美寿希, Sugimura Mizuki; born 20 November 2003) is a Japanese judoka.

== Career ==
In June 2026, Sugimura competed at the 2026 Judo Grand Prix Qingdao and won a silver medal in the –78 kg category. In October 2026, she competed at the 2026 Asian Games and won a gold medal in the –78 kg category. She also won a gold medal in the mixed team event.
