= Judo at the 2025 Summer World University Games – Women's 63 kg =

Women's 63 kg at the 2025 Summer World University Games
- Venue: Messe Essen
- Location: Essen
- Dates: 24 July
- Competitors: 23

Medalists
gold medal	Narumi Tanioka	Japan
silver medal	Laura Fazliu	Kosovo
bronze medal	Renata Zachová	Czech Republic
bronze medal	Florentina Ivănescu	Romania

The women's 63 kg at the 2025 Summer World University Games in Rhine-Ruhr, Germany was held 24 July 2025. Narumi Tanioka of Japan captured the gold medal. Laura Fazliu of Kosovo took home the silver medal. The bronze medals were awarded to Renata Zachová of Czech Republic and Florentina Ivănescu of Romania.

== Schedule ==
All times are Central European Time (UTC+1)

Date	Time	Event
24 July 2015	10:00	Preliminary Rounds
24 July 2015	17:00	Final Block

== Results ==
Athletes advanced through direct knockout rounds—including the round of 32, round of 16, quarterfinals, and semifinals—to determine the two finalists fighting for the gold and silver medals. Parallel to the main bracket, a repechage system allowed defeated quarterfinalists to work their way back into the tournament, culminating in two separate bronze medal matches where the repechage winners faced the losing semifinalists.

Round of 32
L Grabner (AUT)	100 (yellow card)
A Yeksan (TUR)	000 (yellow card)
A Szafran (POL)	000 (yellow card)
A Fernández (ESP)	010
D Boursas (FRA)	000
E Renes (NED)	010 (yellow card)
S Yergaliyeva (KAZ)	010
M Ganbat (MGL)	000
D Tcaci (MDA)	100
A Vasiliauskaitė (LTU)	000
C Friden (SUI)	000
L Tománková (SVK)	010
R Gonçalves (BRA)	000
Shin Cw (KOR)	100 (yellow card)

Round of 16
L Fazliu (KOS)	002 (yellow card)
S Bordinskykh (UKR)	000 (yellow card)
V Folger (GER)	010
L Grabner (AUT)	000
F Favorini (ITA)	010
A Fernández (ESP)	000
B Varga (HUN)	001 (yellow card)
E Renes (NED)	000
R Zachová (CZE)	010
S Yergaliyeva (KAZ)	000
H Tokas (IND)	000
D Tcaci (MDA)	100
F Ivănescu (ROU)	100 (yellow card)
L Tománková (SVK)	000
N Tanioka (JPN)	100 (yellow card)
Shin Cw (KOR)	000

Quarter-finals
L Fazliu (KOS)	110
V Folger (GER)	000 (yellow card)
F Favorini (ITA)	102
B Varga (HUN)	000
R Zachová (CZE)	010 (yellow card)
D Tcaci (MDA)	000
F Ivănescu (ROU)	000
N Tanioka (JPN)	021

Semi-finals
L Fazliu (KOS)	101 (yellow card)
F Favorini (ITA)	000
R Zachová (CZE)	000
N Tanioka (JPN)	100

Final
L Fazliu (KOS)	000
N Tanioka (JPN)	100

Repechage Phases

Repechage
V Folger (GER)	100
B Varga (HUN)	000
D Tcaci (MDA)	000
F Ivănescu (ROU)	001 (yellow card)

Bronze medal
V Folger (GER)	000
R Zachová (CZE)	010 (yellow card)
F Ivănescu (ROU)	010
F Favorini (ITA)	000 (yellow card)
