= Judo at the 2026 Asian Games =

Judo Judo at the 2026 Asian Games
- Venue: Aichi International Arena
- Location: Nagoya, Aichi Prefecture, Japan
- Dates: 30 September–3 October 2026
- Competitors: 212 from 32 nations
- Website: Official website

Competition at external databases
- Links: IJF • JudoInside

Judo at the 2026 Asian Games will be held between 30 September and 3 October 2026 at the Aichi International Arena.

== Schedule ==
The schedule is as follows:

| Q | Elimination, quarterfinals, repechage and semifinals | F | Final medal matches |

| Date Event | 30; Wed | | 1 Thu | | 2 Fri | | 3 Sat | |
Men's events
| Men's 60 kg | Q | F | | | | | | |
| Men's 66 kg | Q | F | | | | | | |
| Men's 73 kg | | | Q | F | | | | |
| Men's 81 kg | | | Q | F | | | | |
| Men's 90 kg | | | | | Q | F | | |
| Men's 100 kg | | | | | Q | F | | |
| Men's +100 kg | | | | | Q | F | | |
Women's events
| Women's 48 kg | Q | F | | | | | | |
| Women's 52 kg | Q | F | | | | | | |
| Women's 57 kg | | | Q | F | | | | |
| Women's 63 kg | | | Q | F | | | | |
| Women's 70 kg | | | Q | F | | | | |
| Women's 78 kg | | | | | Q | F | | |
| Women's +78 kg | | | | | Q | F | | |
Mixed events
| Mixed team | | | | | | | Q | F |

== Medal summary ==
=== Medal table ===
* Host nation (Japan)

| Rank | Nation | Gold | Silver | Bronze | Total |
|---|---|---|---|---|---|
| 1 | Japan* | 9 | 1 | 4 | 14 |
| 2 | Uzbekistan | 2 | 2 | 3 | 7 |
| 3 | South Korea | 1 | 3 | 4 | 8 |
| 4 | Mongolia | 1 | 1 | 5 | 7 |
| 5 | China | 1 | 0 | 5 | 6 |
| 6 | United Arab Emirates | 1 | 0 | 0 | 1 |
| 7 | Kazakhstan | 0 | 5 | 2 | 7 |
| 8 | Tajikistan | 0 | 1 | 3 | 4 |
| 9 | North Korea | 0 | 1 | 2 | 3 |
| 10 | Kyrgyzstan | 0 | 1 | 0 | 1 |
| 11 | Bahrain | 0 | 0 | 1 | 1 |
| 11 | Lebanon | 0 | 0 | 1 | 1 |
| Totals (12 entries) | | 15 | 15 | 30 | 60 |

=== Medalists ===
==== Men's events ====
| Event | Gold | Silver | Bronze |
|---|---|---|---|
| Extra-lightweight (60 kg) | Hayato Kondo; Japan | Yeldos Smetov; Kazakhstan | Ma Yulin; China |
| Extra-lightweight (60 kg) | Hayato Kondo; Japan | Yeldos Smetov; Kazakhstan | Samariddin Kuchkarov; Uzbekistan |
| Half-lightweight (66 kg) | Kazirbekiin Yolk; Mongolia | Abdurakhim Nutfulloev; Uzbekistan | Sukhrob Boqiev; Bahrain |
| Half-lightweight (66 kg) | Kazirbekiin Yolk; Mongolia | Abdurakhim Nutfulloev; Uzbekistan | Xue Ziyang; China |
| Lightweight (73 kg) | Kazbek Naguchev; United Arab Emirates | Shakhram Ahadov; Uzbekistan | Muhiddin Asadulloev; Tajikistan |
| Lightweight (73 kg) | Kazbek Naguchev; United Arab Emirates | Shakhram Ahadov; Uzbekistan | Tatsuki Ishihara; Japan |
| Half-middleweight (81 kg) | Sotaro Fujiwara; Japan | Adilet Almat; Kazakhstan | Lee Joon-hwan; South Korea |
| Half-middleweight (81 kg) | Sotaro Fujiwara; Japan | Adilet Almat; Kazakhstan | Abubakr Sherov; Tajikistan |
| Middleweight (90 kg) | Riku Okada; Japan | Erlan Sherov; Kyrgyzstan | Han Qi; China |
| Middleweight (90 kg) | Riku Okada; Japan | Erlan Sherov; Kyrgyzstan | Kim Jong-hoon; South Korea |
| Half-heavyweight (100 kg) | Ryotaro Masuchi; Japan | Dzhakhongir Madzhidov; Tajikistan | Han Ju-yeop; South Korea |
| Half-heavyweight (100 kg) | Ryotaro Masuchi; Japan | Dzhakhongir Madzhidov; Tajikistan | Ernazar Sarsenbaev; Uzbekistan |
| Heavyweight (+100 kg) | Muzaffarbek Turoboyev; Uzbekistan | Hyōga Ōta; Japan | Batkhuyagiin Gonchigsüren; Mongolia |
| Heavyweight (+100 kg) | Muzaffarbek Turoboyev; Uzbekistan | Hyōga Ōta; Japan | Kim Min-jong; South Korea |

==== Women's events ====
| Event | Gold | Silver | Bronze |
|---|---|---|---|
| Extra-lightweight (48 kg) | Mitsuki Kondo; Japan | Abiba Abuzhakynova; Kazakhstan | Akhliya Muminova; Tajikistan |
| Extra-lightweight (48 kg) | Mitsuki Kondo; Japan | Abiba Abuzhakynova; Kazakhstan | Ganbaataryn Narantsetseg; Mongolia |
| Half-lightweight (52 kg) | Sita Kadamboeva; Uzbekistan | Jang Se-yun; South Korea | Xu Aoyu; China |
| Half-lightweight (52 kg) | Sita Kadamboeva; Uzbekistan | Jang Se-yun; South Korea | Kokoro Fujishiro; Japan |
| Lightweight (57 kg) | Huh Mi-mi; South Korea | Terbishiin Ariunzayaa; Mongolia | Kim Hyon-a; North Korea |
| Lightweight (57 kg) | Huh Mi-mi; South Korea | Terbishiin Ariunzayaa; Mongolia | Mio Shirakane; Japan |
| Half-middleweight (63 kg) | Narumi Tanioka; Japan | Kim Ji-hye; North Korea | Esmigul Kuyulova; Kazakhstan |
| Half-middleweight (63 kg) | Narumi Tanioka; Japan | Kim Ji-hye; North Korea | Lkhagvatogoogiin Enkhriilen; Mongolia |
| Middleweight (70 kg) | Rin Maeda; Japan | Azhar Askhat; Kazakhstan | Uran-Ölziin Anujin; Mongolia |
| Middleweight (70 kg) | Rin Maeda; Japan | Azhar Askhat; Kazakhstan | Mun Song-hui; North Korea |
| Half-heavyweight (78 kg) | Mizuki Sugimura; Japan | Kim Min-ju; South Korea | Aqulina Chayeb; Lebanon |
| Half-heavyweight (78 kg) | Mizuki Sugimura; Japan | Kim Min-ju; South Korea | Ekaterina Tokareva; Kazakhstan |
| Heavyweight (+78 kg) | Niu Xinran; China | Lee Hyeon-ji; South Korea | Amarsaikhany Adiyaasüren; Mongolia |
| Heavyweight (+78 kg) | Niu Xinran; China | Lee Hyeon-ji; South Korea | Miki Mukunoki; Japan |

==== Mixed events ====
| Event | Gold | Silver | Bronze |
|---|---|---|---|
| Mixed team | Japan; Hidetoshi Tokumochi; Mio Shirakane; Moa Ono; Narumi Tanioka; Miki Mukunoki; Mizuki Sugimura; Yuta Nakamura; Tatsuki Ishihara; Shinsei Hattori; Utana Terada; Hyōga Ōta; Riku Okada | Kazakhstan; Bakhitzhan Abdurakhmanov; Adilet Almat; Aidar Arapov; Gusman Kyrgyzbayev; Dana Abdirova; Esmigul Kuyulova; Marat Baikamurov; Azhar Askhat; Aida Toishibekova; Yerassyl Kazhybayev; Ekaterina Tokareva; Meruyert Sarsenova | China; Li Haiyang; Huang Fuchun; Lin Gaohui; Shi Zhenyu; Han Qi; Tao Yuying; Zhang Wen; Tang Jing; Wu Hongtao; Xu Aoyu; Niu Xinran |
| Mixed team | Japan; Hidetoshi Tokumochi; Mio Shirakane; Moa Ono; Narumi Tanioka; Miki Mukunoki; Mizuki Sugimura; Yuta Nakamura; Tatsuki Ishihara; Shinsei Hattori; Utana Terada; Hyōga Ōta; Riku Okada | Kazakhstan; Bakhitzhan Abdurakhmanov; Adilet Almat; Aidar Arapov; Gusman Kyrgyzbayev; Dana Abdirova; Esmigul Kuyulova; Marat Baikamurov; Azhar Askhat; Aida Toishibekova; Yerassyl Kazhybayev; Ekaterina Tokareva; Meruyert Sarsenova | Uzbekistan; Abdurakhim Nutfulloev; Shakhram Ahadov; Arslonbek Tojiev; Ernazar Sarsenbaev; Muzaffarbek Turoboyev; Sita Kadamboeva; Shukurjon Aminova; Khurshida Razzokberdieva; Shirinjon Yuldoshova; Iriskhon Kurbanbaeva; Umida Nigmatova; Nurbek Murtozoev |

== Participating nations ==
- Afghanistan (2)
- Bahrain (7)
- Bangladesh (4)
- Cambodia (3)
- China (13)
- Chinese Taipei (10)
- Hong Kong (6)
- India (3)
- Indonesia (6)
- Iran (6)
- Japan (18) (host)
- Kazakhstan (14)
- Kyrgyzstan (13)
- Laos (5)
- Lebanon (2)
- Malaysia (1)
- Mongolia (17)
- Nepal (6)
- North Korea (4)
- Palestine (1)
- Philippines (9)
- Qatar (2)
- Saudi Arabia (1)
- South Korea (18)
- Sri Lanka (4)
- Syria (2)
- Tajikistan (9)
- Thailand (7)
- United Arab Emirates (5)
- Uzbekistan (16)
- Vietnam (2)
- Yemen (1)
