= Judo at the 2026 Asian Games – Men's +100 kg =

Judo competition

Judo Men's +100 kg at the 2026 Asian Games
- Venue: Aichi International Arena
- Location: Nagoya, Japan

Medalists
gold medal	Muzaffarbek Turoboyev	Uzbekistan
silver medal	Hyōga Ōta	Japan
bronze medal	Batkhuyagiin Gonchigsüren	Mongolia
bronze medal	Kim Min-jong	South Korea

The men's +100 kilograms (Heavyweight) competition in Judo at the 2026 Asian Games in Nagoya was held on 2 October 2026 at the Aichi International Arena.

== Schedule ==
All times are Japan Standard Time (UTC+09:00)

Date	Time	Event
Friday, 2 October 2026	11:00	Elimination round of 16
Friday, 2 October 2026	11:00	Quarterfinals
Friday, 2 October 2026	11:00	Repechage
Friday, 2 October 2026	11:00	Semifinals
Friday, 2 October 2026	17:00	Finals

== Results ==
=== Main bracket ===
==== Final ====
Final
Hyōga Ōta (JPN)	000 (yellow card)
Muzaffarbek Turoboyev (UZB)	100

==== Top half ====
Round of 16
Emirkhan Zholdoshkaziev (KGZ)	100
Dai You-ming (TPE)	000
Magomedomar Magomedomarov (UAE)	111
Eskelen Kedo (PHI)	000

Quarter-finals
Hyōga Ōta (JPN)	100
Emirkhan Zholdoshkaziev (KGZ)	000 (yellow card)
Li Haiyang (CHN)	000
Magomedomar Magomedomarov (UAE)	001 (yellow card)

Semi-finals
Hyōga Ōta (JPN)	001 (yellow card)
Magomedomar Magomedomarov (UAE)	000

==== Bottom half ====
Round of 16
Yerassyl Kazhibayev (KAZ)	100 (yellow card)
I Gede Agastya Darma Wardana (INA)	000 (yellow card)
Muzaffarbek Turoboyev (UZB)	101 (yellow card)
Mansur Rahmon (TJK)	000 (yellow card)

Quarter-finals
Batkhuyagiin Gonchigsüren (MGL)	100 (yellow card)
Yerassyl Kazhibayev (KAZ)	000 (yellow card)
Kim Min-jong (KOR)	000
Muzaffarbek Turoboyev (UZB)	100 (yellow card)

Semi-finals
Batkhuyagiin Gonchigsüren (MGL)	000
Muzaffarbek Turoboyev (UZB)	101

=== Repechage ===
Repechage
Emirkhan Zholdoshkaziev (KGZ)	102 (yellow card)
Li Haiyang (CHN)	000 (yellow card)
Yerassyl Kazhibayev (KAZ)	000
Kim Min-jong (KOR)	101

Bronze medal
Emirkhan Zholdoshkaziev (KGZ)	000
Batkhuyagiin Gonchigsüren (MGL)	001 (yellow card)
Kim Min-jong (KOR)	100
Magomedomar Magomedomarov (UAE)	000
