= Judo at the 2026 Asian Games – Men's 90 kg =

Judo competition

Judo Men's 90 kg at the 2026 Asian Games
- Venue: Aichi International Arena
- Location: Nagoya, Japan

Medalists
gold medal	Riku Okada	Japan
silver medal	Erlan Sherov	Kyrgyzstan
bronze medal	Han Qi	China
bronze medal	Kim Jong-hoon	South Korea

The men's 90 kilograms (Middleweight) competition in Judo at the 2026 Asian Games in Nagoya was held on 2 October 2026 at the Aichi International Arena.

== Schedule ==
All times are Japan Standard Time (UTC+09:00)

Date	Time	Event
Friday, 2 October 2026	11:00	Elimination round of 16
Friday, 2 October 2026	11:00	Quarterfinals
Friday, 2 October 2026	11:00	Repechage
Friday, 2 October 2026	11:00	Semifinals
Friday, 2 October 2026	17:00	Finals

== Results ==
=== Main bracket ===
==== Final ====
Final
Riku Okada (JPN)	010
Erlan Sherov (KGZ)	000 (yellow card)

==== Top half ====
Round of 16
Kim Jong-hoon (KOR)	100
I Made Dharma (INA)	000
Han Qi (CHN)	102 (yellow card)
Puyang Wei (THA)	000
Riku Okada (JPN)	110
Sujan Gurung (NEP)	000
Chen Peng-yu (TPE)	000
Jügdergaravyn Enkhtör (MGL)	010 (yellow card)

Quarter-finals
Kim Jong-hoon (KOR)	011
Han Qi (CHN)	000 (yellow card)
Riku Okada (JPN)	100
Jügdergaravyn Enkhtör (MGL)	000

Semi-finals
Kim Jong-hoon (KOR)	000 (yellow card)
Riku Okada (JPN)	100

==== Bottom half ====
Round of 16
Nurbek Murtozoev (UZB)	100
Shodmon Rizoev (TJK)	000
Amir Abbas Choopan (IRI)	100 (yellow card)
Vitshika Bayt (CAM)	001 (yellow card)
Aidar Arapov (KAZ)	000
Gadzhimurad Omarov (UAE)	001
Erlan Sherov (KGZ)	100
Micheal Marko (SRI)	000

Quarter-finals
Nurbek Murtozoev (UZB)	100 (yellow card)
Amir Abbas Choopan (IRI)	000
Gadzhimurad Omarov (UAE)	001
Erlan Sherov (KGZ)	100

Semi-finals
Nurbek Murtozoev (UZB)	000
Erlan Sherov (KGZ)	100

=== Repechage ===
Repechage
Han Qi (CHN)	010 (yellow card)
Jügdergaravyn Enkhtör (MGL)	000
Amir Abbas Choopan (IRI)	110 (yellow card)
Gadzhimurad Omarov (UAE)	000

Bronze medal
Han Qi (CHN)	100
Nurbek Murtozoev (UZB)	000
Amir Abbas Choopan (IRI)	000
Kim Jong-hoon (KOR)	101
