= Judo at the 2025 Summer World University Games =

Judo competition

Judo Judo at the 2025 Summer World University Games
- Venue: Messe Essen Halle 4
- Location: Essen, North Rhine-Westphalia, Germany
- Dates: 23–26 July
- Competitors: 367 from 57 nations
- Website: Official website

Competition at external databases
- Links: IJF • JudoInside

Judo took place at the 2025 Summer World University Games from 23 to 26 July 2025 at the Messe Essen in Essen, North Rhine-Westphalia, Germany.

== Medal table ==
* Host nation (Germany)

Rank	Nation	Gold	Silver	Bronze	Total
1	Japan	8	2	4	14
2	South Korea	4	0	3	7
3	Germany*	1	1	1	3
4	Moldova	1	0	0	1
4	Poland	1	0	0	1
6	Georgia	0	3	1	4
–	Individual Neutral Athletes	0	2	1	3
7	France	0	1	3	4
8	Brazil	0	1	2	3
9	China	0	1	1	2
9	Hungary	0	1	1	2
11	Azerbaijan	0	1	0	1
11	Kosovo	0	1	0	1
11	Spain	0	1	0	1
14	Czech Republic	0	0	3	3
15	Kazakhstan	0	0	2	2
15	Romania	0	0	2	2
15	Uzbekistan	0	0	2	2
18	Cyprus	0	0	1	1
18	Finland	0	0	1	1
18	Mongolia	0	0	1	1
18	Portugal	0	0	1	1
Totals (21 entries)		15	15	30	60

== Medal summary ==
=== Men's events ===
Event	Gold	Silver	Bronze
Extra-lightweight (−60 kg)	Yamato Fukuda; Japan	Luis Barroso López; Spain	Tüvshintöriin Tümenjargal; Mongolia
Extra-lightweight (−60 kg)	Yamato Fukuda; Japan	Luis Barroso López; Spain	Aman Bakytzhan; Kazakhstan
Half-lightweight (−66 kg)	Kairi Kentoku; Japan	Abrek Naguchev; Individual Neutral Athletes	Henrique Silva; Brazil
Half-lightweight (−66 kg)	Kairi Kentoku; Japan	Abrek Naguchev; Individual Neutral Athletes	Nurkanat Serikbayev; Kazakhstan
Lightweight (−73 kg)	Adil Osmanov; Moldova	Armen Agaian; Individual Neutral Athletes	Hans-Jorris Ahibo; France
Lightweight (−73 kg)	Adil Osmanov; Moldova	Armen Agaian; Individual Neutral Athletes	Ryuga Tanaka; Japan
Half-middleweight (−81 kg)	Kaito Amano; Japan	Zaur Dvalashvili; Georgia	Lee Joon-hwan; South Korea
Half-middleweight (−81 kg)	Kaito Amano; Japan	Zaur Dvalashvili; Georgia	Petr Mladý; Czech Republic
Middleweight (−90 kg)	Kim Jong-hoon; South Korea	Eljan Hajiyev; Azerbaijan	Komei Kawabata; Japan
Middleweight (−90 kg)	Kim Jong-hoon; South Korea	Eljan Hajiyev; Azerbaijan	Gergely Nerpel; Hungary
Half-heavyweight (−100 kg)	Michał Jędrzejewski; Poland	Nika Kharazishvili; Georgia	Nozomu Miki; Japan
Half-heavyweight (−100 kg)	Michał Jędrzejewski; Poland	Nika Kharazishvili; Georgia	Alexandru Sibișan; Romania
Heavyweight (+100 kg)	Yuta Nakamura; Japan	Saba Inaneishvili; Georgia	Giannis Antoniou; Cyprus
Heavyweight (+100 kg)	Yuta Nakamura; Japan	Saba Inaneishvili; Georgia	Valeriy Endovitskiy; Individual Neutral Athletes

=== Women's events ===
Event	Gold	Silver	Bronze
Extra-lightweight (−48 kg)	Mizuki Harada; Japan	Zhuang Wenna; China	Laziza Haydarova; Uzbekistan
Extra-lightweight (−48 kg)	Mizuki Harada; Japan	Zhuang Wenna; China	Helen Habib; Germany
Half-lightweight (−52 kg)	Jang Se-yun; South Korea	Hako Fukunaga; Japan	Tereza Bodnárová; Czech Republic
Half-lightweight (−52 kg)	Jang Se-yun; South Korea	Hako Fukunaga; Japan	Léa Beres; France
Lightweight (−57 kg)	Huh Mi-mi; South Korea	Róza Gyertyás; Hungary	Shukurjon Aminova; Uzbekistan
Lightweight (−57 kg)	Huh Mi-mi; South Korea	Róza Gyertyás; Hungary	Moa Ono; Japan
Half-middleweight (−63 kg)	Narumi Tanioka; Japan	Laura Fazliu; Kosovo	Renata Zachová; Czech Republic
Half-middleweight (−63 kg)	Narumi Tanioka; Japan	Laura Fazliu; Kosovo	Florentina Ivănescu; Romania
Middleweight (−70 kg)	Rin Maeda; Japan	Samira Bock; Germany	Teophila Darbes-Takam; France
Middleweight (−70 kg)	Rin Maeda; Japan	Samira Bock; Germany	Taís Pina; Portugal
Half-heavyweight (−78 kg)	Anna Monta Olek; Germany	Beatriz Freitas; Brazil	Kim Min-ju; South Korea
Half-heavyweight (−78 kg)	Anna Monta Olek; Germany	Beatriz Freitas; Brazil	Emma Krapu; Finland
Heavyweight (+78 kg)	Kim Ha-yun; South Korea	Miki Mukunoki; Japan	Sophio Somkhishvili; Georgia
Heavyweight (+78 kg)	Kim Ha-yun; South Korea	Miki Mukunoki; Japan	Jia Chundi; China

=== Mixed event ===
Event	Gold	Silver	Bronze
Team	Japan; Hako Fukunaga; Rin Maeda; Miki Mukunoki; Moa Ono; Mizuki Sugimura; Narumi Tanioka; Kaito Amano; Komei Kawabata; Kairi Kentoku; Nozomu Miki; Yuta Nakamura; Ryuga Tanaka	France; Léa Beres; Doria Boursas; Célia Cancan; Teophila Darbes-Takam; Chloé Devictor; Kaïla Issoufi; Dounia Nacer; Hans-Jorris Ahibo; Yoann Benezra; Hadrien Cargnelli; Angel Gustan; Simon Lesauvage	Brazil; Luana Carvalho; Beatriz Comanche; Gabriela Conceição; Beatriz Freitas; Rafaella Gonçalves; Thauana Silva; Luan Almeida; Gabriel Arévalo; Guilherme de Oliveira; Guilherme Morais; Daniel Nazaré; Henrique Silva
Team	Japan; Hako Fukunaga; Rin Maeda; Miki Mukunoki; Moa Ono; Mizuki Sugimura; Narumi Tanioka; Kaito Amano; Komei Kawabata; Kairi Kentoku; Nozomu Miki; Yuta Nakamura; Ryuga Tanaka	France; Léa Beres; Doria Boursas; Célia Cancan; Teophila Darbes-Takam; Chloé Devictor; Kaïla Issoufi; Dounia Nacer; Hans-Jorris Ahibo; Yoann Benezra; Hadrien Cargnelli; Angel Gustan; Simon Lesauvage	South Korea; Huh Mi-mi; Jang Se-yun; Kim Ha-yun; Kim Min-ju; Lee Ye-rang; Shin Chae-won; An Jae-hong; Hwang Hye-sung; Kim Jong-hoon; Lee Joon-hwan; Song Woo-hyeok; Yoon Hyeon-su

== Participating nations ==
A total of 367 athletes from 57 nations competed in the judo events of the 2025 Summer World University Games.

- Argentina (1)
- Armenia (2)
- Austria (6)
- Azerbaijan (12)
- Bangladesh (1)
- Belgium (4)
- Bosnia and Herzegovina (1)
- Brazil (14)
- Cambodia (4)
- Chile (4)
- China (2)
- Chinese Taipei (9)
- Colombia (1)
- Croatia (3)
- Cyprus (3)
- Czech Republic (7)
- Denmark (1)
- Ecuador (8)
- Finland (2)
- France (11)
- Georgia (10)
- Germany (13) (host)
- Great Britain (3)
- Haiti (2)
- Hungary (13)
- India (14)
- Individual Neutral Athletes (7)
- Italy (7)
- Japan (14)
- Kazakhstan (13)
- Kosovo (2)
- Kyrgyzstan (6)
- Lebanon (6)
- Lithuania (6)
- Macau (3)
- Malta (1)
- Mexico (2)
- Moldova (9)
- Mongolia (10)
- Netherlands (13)
- Nigeria (3)
- Pakistan (3)
- Poland (10)
- Portugal (4)
- Romania (3)
- Singapore (3)
- Slovakia (5)
- Slovenia (8)
- South Korea (13)
- Spain (14)
- Switzerland (2)
- Tajikistan (1)
- Thailand (2)
- Turkey (9)
- Ukraine (13)
- United States (12)
- Uzbekistan (12)
