= Judo at the 2026 Asian Games – Women's +78 kg =

Judo competition

Judo Women's +78 kg at the 2026 Asian Games
- Venue: Aichi International Arena
- Location: Nagoya, Japan

Medalists
gold medal	Niu Xinran	China
silver medal	Lee Hyeon-ji	South Korea
bronze medal	Amarsaikhany Adiyaasüren	Mongolia
bronze medal	Miki Mukunoki	Japan

The women's +78 kilograms (Heavyweight) competition in Judo at the 2026 Asian Games in Nagoya was held on 2 October 2026 at the Aichi International Arena.

== Schedule ==
All times are Japan Standard Time (UTC+09:00)

Date	Time	Event
Friday, 2 October 2026	11:00	Elimination round of 16
Friday, 2 October 2026	11:00	Quarterfinals
Friday, 2 October 2026	11:00	Repechage
Friday, 2 October 2026	11:00	Semifinals
Friday, 2 October 2026	17:00	Finals

== Results ==
=== Main bracket ===
==== Final ====
Final
Lee Hyeon-ji (KOR)	001
Niu Xinran (CHN)	100 (yellow card)

==== Top half ====
Round of 16
Indah Permatasari (INA)	001 (yellow card)
Thonthan Satjadet (THA)	010

Quarter-finals
Lee Hyeon-ji (KOR)	100
Thonthan Satjadet (THA)	000
Umida Nigmatova (UZB)	000
Miki Mukunoki (JPN)	100

Semi-finals
Lee Hyeon-ji (KOR)	001
Miki Mukunoki (JPN)	000

==== Bottom half ====
Round of 16
Chang Ling-fang (TPE)	001
Aidemi Kalyeva (KGZ)	000 (yellow card)

Quarter-finals
Niu Xinran (CHN)	101
Chang Ling-fang (TPE)	000
Amarsaikhany Adiyaasüren (MGL)	001
Aida Toishibekova (KAZ)	000 (yellow card)

Semi-finals
Niu Xinran (CHN)	001
Amarsaikhany Adiyaasüren (MGL)	000

=== Repechage ===
Repechage
Thonthan Satjadet (THA)	000
Umida Nigmatova (UZB)	100
Chang Ling-fang (TPE)	000
Aida Toishibekova (KAZ)	101

Bronze medal
Umida Nigmatova (UZB)	000
Amarsaikhany Adiyaasüren (MGL)	100
Aida Toishibekova (KAZ)	000 (yellow card)
Miki Mukunoki (JPN)	100 (yellow card)
