= Judo at the 2026 Asian Games – Women's 78 kg =

Judo competition

Judo Women's 78 kg at the 2026 Asian Games
- Venue: Aichi International Arena
- Location: Nagoya, Japan

Medalists
gold medal	Mizuki Sugimura	Japan
silver medal	Kim Min-ju	South Korea
bronze medal	Aqulina Chayeb	Lebanon
bronze medal	Ekaterina Tokareva	Kazakhstan

The women's 78 kilograms (Half heavyweight) competition in Judo at the 2026 Asian Games in Nagoya was held on 2 October 2026 at the Aichi International Arena.

== Schedule ==
All times are Japan Standard Time (UTC+09:00)

Date	Time	Event
Friday, 2 October 2026	11:00	Elimination round of 16
Friday, 2 October 2026	11:00	Quarterfinals
Friday, 2 October 2026	11:00	Repechage
Friday, 2 October 2026	11:00	Semifinals
Friday, 2 October 2026	17:00	Finals

== Results ==
=== Main bracket ===
==== Final ====
Final
Mizuki Sugimura (JPN)	100
Kim Min-ju (KOR)	000

==== Top half ====
Round of 16
Otgonbayaryn Khüslen (MGL)	000
Maryam Barbat (IRI)	100
Barchinoy Kodirova (UZB)	100
Obonika Hassan (BAN)	000

Quarter-finals
Wu Hongtao (CHN)	000 (yellow card)
Maryam Barbat (IRI)	101 (yellow card)
Mizuki Sugimura (JPN)	100 (yellow card)
Barchinoy Kodirova (UZB)	000

Semi-finals
Maryam Barbat (IRI)	010
Mizuki Sugimura (JPN)	111

==== Bottom half ====
Round of 16
Ekaterina Tokareva (KAZ)	100 (yellow card)
Kiyomi Watanabe (PHI)	000 (yellow card)
Aqulina Chayeb (LBN)	w/o
~~Aiganysh Dzhumalieva (KGZ)~~	DSQ

Quarter-finals
Kim Min-ju (KOR)	101
Ekaterina Tokareva (KAZ)	001
Hsu Wang Shu-huei (TPE)	000 (yellow card)
Aqulina Chayeb (LBN)	010

Semi-finals
Kim Min-ju (KOR)	002 (yellow card)
Aqulina Chayeb (LBN)	000 (yellow card)

=== Repechage ===
Repechage
Wu Hongtao (CHN)	100
Barchinoy Kodirova (UZB)	000
Ekaterina Tokareva (KAZ)	110
Hsu Wang Shu-huei (TPE)	000 (yellow card)

Bronze medal
Wu Hongtao (CHN)	000
Aqulina Chayeb (LBN)	100
Ekaterina Tokareva (KAZ)	012
Maryam Barbat (IRI)	000 (yellow card)
