= Miki Mukunoki =

Japanese judoka

Personal information
- Born: 8 June 2003 (age 23)
- Education: International Pacific University
- Occupation: Judoka

Sport
- Country: Japan
- Sport: Judo
- Weight class: +78 kg
- Club: V Technology
Medal record
Women's judo
Representing Japan
Asian Games
Gold medal – first place	2026 Aichi‑Nagoya	Mixed team
Bronze medal – third place	2026 Aichi‑Nagoya	+78 kg
IJF Grand Slam
Gold medal – first place	2025 Abu Dhabi	+78 kg
IJF Grand Prix
Silver medal – second place	2024 Odivelas	+78 kg
Bronze medal – third place	2025 Linz	+78 kg
World Juniors Championships
Gold medal – first place	2022 Guayaquil	Mixed team
Silver medal – second place	2023 Odivelas	+78 kg
Bronze medal – third place	2022 Guayaquil	+78 kg
World University Games
Silver medal – second place	2025 Essen	+78 kg

Profile at external databases
- IJF: 69058
- JudoInside.com: 155444
- Updated on 12 October 2026

Miki Mukunoki (Japanese: 椋木 美希; born 8 June 2003) is a Japanese judoka who competes in the women's +78 kg weight category. She has won medals at the World Judo Juniors Championships and the Summer World University Games, and won the +78 kg event at the 2025 Abu Dhabi Grand Slam. She also won bronze in the individual event and gold in the mixed-team competition at the 2026 Asian Games.

== Career ==
Mukunoki attended Takatsu Junior High School, Soshi Gakuen High School and International Pacific University. She represents Japan in international judo competitions in the women's +78 kg category.

In 2022, Mukunoki won bronze in the women's +78 kg event at the World Judo Juniors Championships in Guayaquil, Ecuador. She was also a member of the Japanese team that won the mixed-team competition at the same championships.

In 2023, she won silver in the women's +78 kg event at the World Judo Juniors Championships in Odivelas, Portugal. In January 2024, she also won silver at the Portugal Grand Prix.

In March 2025, Mukunoki won bronze at the Upper Austria Grand Prix in Linz. In July, she won silver in the women's +78 kg event at the Summer World University Games in the Rhine-Ruhr region of Germany. In November, she won the gold medal at the Abu Dhabi Grand Slam, defeating China's Xinran Niu in the final.

At the 2026 Asian Games in Aichi–Nagoya, Japan, Mukunoki won the bronze medal in the women's +78 kg event. She also competed in the mixed-team event, helping Japan win the gold medal. In the mixed-team quarter-final against Uzbekistan and the semi-final against Mongolia, she was selected to compete in the +70 kg category; Japan went on to win the final against Kazakhstan.
