= Judo at the 2026 Asian Games – Women's 63 kg =

Judo competition

Judo Women's 63 kg at the 2026 Asian Games
- Venue: Aichi International Arena
- Location: Nagoya, Japan

Medalists
gold medal	Narumi Tanioka	Japan
silver medal	Kim Ji-hye	North Korea
bronze medal	Esmigul Kuyulova	Kazakhstan
bronze medal	Lkhagvatogoogiin Enkhriilen	Mongolia

The women's 63 kilograms (Half middleweight) competition in Judo at the 2026 Asian Games in Nagoya was held on 1 October 2026 at the Aichi International Arena.

== Schedule ==
All times are Japan Standard Time (UTC+09:00)

Date	Time	Event
Thursday, 1 October 2026	11:00	Elimination round of 16
Thursday, 1 October 2026	11:00	Quarterfinals
Thursday, 1 October 2026	11:00	Repechage
Thursday, 1 October 2026	11:00	Semifinals
Thursday, 1 October 2026	17:00	Finals

== Results ==
=== Main bracket ===
==== Final ====
Final
Kim Ji-hye (PRK)	000
Narumi Tanioka (JPN)	010 (yellow card)

==== Top half ====
Round of 16
Adina Kochkonbaeva (KGZ)	010
Khrizzie Pabulayan (PHI)	000 (yellow card)

Quarter-finals
Lkhagvatogoogiin Enkhriilen (MGL)	100 (yellow card)
Adina Kochkonbaeva (KGZ)	000
Kim Ji-hye (PRK)	011 (yellow card)
Marjona Nurulloeva (UZB)	000

Semi-finals
Lkhagvatogoogiin Enkhriilen (MGL)	000
Kim Ji-hye (PRK)	100 (yellow card)

==== Bottom half ====
Round of 16
Yuan Pei-chun (TPE)	000 (yellow card)
Zhang Wen (CHN)	011 (yellow card)

Quarter-finals
Narumi Tanioka (JPN)	001 (yellow card)
Zhang Wen (CHN)	000 (yellow card)
Kim Ji-su (KOR)	001
Esmigul Kuyulova (KAZ)	100 (yellow card)

Semi-finals
Narumi Tanioka (JPN)	100 (yellow card)
Esmigul Kuyulova (KAZ)	000

=== Repechage ===
Repechage
Adina Kochkonbaeva (KGZ)	000
Marjona Nurulloeva (UZB)	001 (yellow card)
Zhang Wen (CHN)	000
Kim Ji-su (KOR)	110

Bronze medal
Marjona Nurulloeva (UZB)	000
Esmigul Kuyulova (KAZ)	010
Kim Ji-su (KOR)	000
Lkhagvatogoogiin Enkhriilen (MGL)	100 (yellow card)
