= Utana Terada =

Japanese judoka

Personal information
- Native name: 寺田 宇多菜
- Born: 10 March 1999 (age 27)
- Occupation: Judoka

Sport
- Country: Japan
- Sport: Judo
- Weight class: ‍–‍70 kg
- Rank: 4th dan black belt
- Club: JR East
Medal record
Women's judo
Representing Japan
Asian Games
Gold medal – first place	2026 Aichi‑Nagoya	Mixed team
IJF Grand Slam
Gold medal – first place	2021 Baku	‍–‍70 kg
Gold medal – first place	2025 Ulaanbaatar	‍–‍70 kg
Silver medal – second place	2024 Tokyo	‍–‍70 kg
Bronze medal – third place	2022 Baku	‍–‍63 kg

Profile at external databases
- IJF: 65425
- JudoInside.com: 142433
- Updated on 12 October 2026

Utana Terada (Japanese: 寺田 宇多菜; born 10 March 1999) is a Japanese judoka who competes in the women's 70 kg division. She represents JR East and has won medals on the International Judo Federation World Judo Tour, including gold at the 2025 Ulaanbaatar Grand Slam. She was a member of the Japanese team that won the mixed-team gold medal at the 2026 Asian Games.

== Career ==
Terada attended Koryo Junior High School, Keiai High School and Toin University of Yokohama before joining JR East. She competes in the women's 70 kg category and has represented Japan in domestic and international tournaments.

In November 2021, Terada won the gold medal in the women's 70 kg category at the Baku Grand Slam. She won bronze at the 2022 Baku Grand Slam and finished fifth at the 2023 Tokyo Grand Slam.

At the 2023 Kodokan Cup All-Japan Judo Championships by Weight Category, Terada won the women's 70 kg title. She won the same competition again in November 2024 and went on to take silver at the 2024 Tokyo Grand Slam after reaching the final against fellow Japanese judoka Mayu Honda.

In April 2025, Terada finished runner-up at the All-Japan Selected Judo Championships by Weight Category. In July, she won the women's 70 kg title at the Ulaanbaatar Grand Slam, defeating China's Liu Lu in the final by waza-ari followed by a hold-down.

Terada was selected for Japan's team at the 2026 Asian Games in Aichi and Nagoya. She competed in the mixed-team event on 3 October. Japan won the gold medal in the event, with Terada and Moa Ohno among the Japanese judoka who contributed to the team's victory.
