= Judo at the 2026 Asian Games – Men's 73 kg =

Judo competition

Judo Men's 73 kg at the 2026 Asian Games
- Venue: Aichi International Arena
- Location: Nagoya, Japan

Medalists
gold medal	Kazbek Naguchev	United Arab Emirates
silver medal	Shakhram Ahadov	Uzbekistan
bronze medal	Muhiddin Asadulloev	Tajikistan
bronze medal	Tatsuki Ishihara	Japan

The men's 73 kilograms (lightweight) competition in Judo at the 2026 Asian Games in Nagoya was held on 1 October 2026 at the Aichi International Arena.

== Schedule ==
All times are Japan Standard Time (UTC+09:00)

Date	Time	Event
Thursday, 1 October 2026	11:00	Elimination round of 32
Thursday, 1 October 2026	11:00	Elimination round of 16
Thursday, 1 October 2026	11:00	Quarterfinals
Thursday, 1 October 2026	11:00	Repechage
Thursday, 1 October 2026	11:00	Semifinals
Thursday, 1 October 2026	17:00	Finals

== Results ==
=== Main bracket ===
Round of 16
Muhiddin Asadulloev (TJK)	001
Chamara Repiyallage (SRI)	000
Masayuki Terada (THA)	000
Gabriel Benedict Quitain (PHI)	100
Kazbek Naguchev (UAE)	100
Mak Hong Nin (HKG)	000
Mukhamed Aloev (BRN)	100
Xaisengxeun Nouveneuen (LAO)	000
Shakhram Ahadov (UZB)	100
Sayed Mohammad Sayedi (AFG)	000
An Jae-hong (KOR)	001
Nurmukhammed Bakirdinov (KGZ)	000
Tatsuki Ishihara (JPN)	001
Bakytzhan Abdurakhmanov (KAZ)	000 (yellow card)
Lin Gaohui (CHN)	000
Lkhamaagiin Enkhdöl (MGL)	100 (yellow card)

Quarter-finals
Muhiddin Asadulloev (TJK)	100
Gabriel Benedict Quitain (PHI)	000
Kazbek Naguchev (UAE)	101
Mukhamed Aloev (BRN)	000 (yellow card)
Shakhram Ahadov (UZB)	010
An Jae-hong (KOR)	000
Tatsuki Ishihara (JPN)	100
Lkhamaagiin Enkhdöl (MGL)	000

Semi-finals
Muhiddin Asadulloev (TJK)	000 (yellow card)
Kazbek Naguchev (UAE)	001
Shakhram Ahadov (UZB)	001 (yellow card)
Tatsuki Ishihara (JPN)	000 (yellow card)

Final
Kazbek Naguchev (UAE)	100 (yellow card)
Shakhram Ahadov (UZB)	000 (yellow card)

=== Repechage ===
Repechage
Gabriel Benedict Quitain (PHI)	000
Mukhamed Aloev (BRN)	001 (yellow card)
An Jae-hong (KOR)	001 (yellow card)
Lkhamaagiin Enkhdöl (MGL)	012 (yellow card)

Bronze medal
Mukhamed Aloev (BRN)	000
Tatsuki Ishihara (JPN)	100
Lkhamaagiin Enkhdöl (MGL)	000 (yellow card)
Muhiddin Asadulloev (TJK)	100 (yellow card)
