= Narumi Tanioka =

Japanese judoka (born 2002)

Personal information
- Born: 8 November 2002 (age 24)
- Occupation: Judoka

Sport
- Country: Japan
- Sport: Judo
- Weight class: ‍–‍63 kg
Medal record
Women's judo
Representing Japan
Asian Games
| Gold medal – first place | 2026 Aichi‑Nagoya | ‍–‍63 kg |
| Gold medal – first place | 2026 Aichi‑Nagoya | Mixed team |
IJF Grand Slam
| Gold medal – first place | 2026 Tashkent | ‍–‍63 kg |
| Silver medal – second place | 2025 Astana | ‍–‍63 kg |
| Bronze medal – third place | 2025 Tokyo | ‍–‍63 kg |
IJF Grand Prix
| Gold medal – first place | 2026 Qingdao | ‍–‍63 kg |
World University Games
| Gold medal – first place | 2025 Rhine‑Ruhr | ‍–‍63 kg |

Profile at external databases
- IJF: 90588
- JudoInside.com: 100311
- Updated on 3 October 2026

Narumi Tanioka (谷岡成美, Tanioka Narumi; born 8 November 2002) is a Japanese judoka.

== Career ==
Tanioka represented Japan at the 2025 Summer World University Games and won a gold medal in the –63 kg category.

In February 2026, she competed at the 2026 Judo Grand Slam Tashkent and won her first career grand slam gold medal in the –63 kg category. In June 2026, she competed at the 2026 Judo Grand Prix Qingdao and won her first career grand prix gold medal in the –63 kg category.

In October 2026, she competed at the 2026 Asian Games and won a gold medal in the –63 kg category. She also won a gold medal in the mixed team event.
