= Judo at the 2026 Asian Games – Mixed team =

Judo competition

Judo Mixed team at the 2026 Asian Games
- Venue: Aichi International Arena
- Date: 3 October 2026
- Competitors: 105 from 10 nations

Medalists
gold medal	Japan; Hidetoshi Tokumochi, Mio Shirakane, Moa Ono, Narumi Tanioka, Miki Mukunoki, Mizuki Sugimura, Yuta Nakamura, Tatsuki Ishihara, Shinsei Hattori, Utana Terada, Hyōga Ōta, Riku Okada
silver medal	Kazakhstan; Bakhitzhan Abdurakhmanov, Adilet Almat, Aidar Arapov, Gusman Kyrgyzbayev, Dana Abdirova, Esmigul Kuyulova, Marat Baikamurov, Azhar Askhat, Aida Toishibekova, Yerassyl Kazhibayev, Ekaterina Tokareva, Meruyert Sarsenova
bronze medal	China; Li Haiyang, Huang Fuchun, Lin Gaohui, Shi Zhenyu, Han Qi, Tao Yuying, Zhang Wen, Tang Jing, Wu Hongtao, Xu Aoyu, Niu Xinran
bronze medal	Uzbekistan; Abdurakhim Nutfulloev, Shakhram Ahadov, Arslonbek Tojiev, Ernazar Sarsenbaev, Muzaffarbek Turoboyev, Sita Kadamboeva, Shukurjon Aminova, Khurshida Razzokberdieva, Shirinjon Yuldoshova, Iriskhon Kurbanbaeva, Umida Nigmatova, Nurbek Murtozoev

The mixed team competition at the 2026 Asian Games in Nagoya was held on 3 October 2026 at the Aichi International Arena.

== Schedule ==
All times are Japan Standard Time (UTC+09:00)

Date	Time	Event
Saturday, 3 October 2026	11:00	Preliminary Rounds
Saturday, 3 October 2026	17:00	Final Block

== Results ==
=== Bracket ===
==== Main ====
Elimination round of 16
Kyrgyzstan	4
Thailand	2
Nepal	0
Chinese Taipei	4

Quarterfinals
South Korea	4
China	1
Kazakhstan	4
Kyrgyzstan	2
Mongolia	4
Chinese Taipei	2
Japan	4
Uzbekistan	1

Semifinals
South Korea	3
Kazakhstan	4
Mongolia	0
Japan	4

Gold medal contest
Kazakhstan	0
Japan	4

==== Repechage ====
Repechage
China	4
Kyrgyzstan	1
Chinese Taipei	0
Uzbekistan	4

Bronze medal contests
China	4
Mongolia	2
Uzbekistan	4
South Korea	2

=== Elimination round of 16 ===
Kyrgyzstan	4–2	Thailand

Aidemi Kalyeva	100–000	Thonthan Satjadet	Women's +70 kg
Daut Poltushev	101–000	Puyang Wei	Men's +90 kg
Zhanar Zholdosheva	100–000	Kamolwan Akkajan	Women's -57 kg
Nurmukhhammed Bakirdinov	000–001	Masayuki Terada	Men's -73 kg
Adina Kochkonbaeva	000–001	Supattra Nanong	Women's -70 kg
Tegin Almazjan Uulu	101–000	Photchara Kanchu	Men's -90 kg

Nepal	0–4	Chinese Taipei

Debaki Maya Shrestha	000–100	Chang Ling-fang	Women's +70 kg
Sujan Gurung	000–100	Dai You-ming	Men's +90 kg
Nisha Shrestha	000–100	Liu Tzu-yun	Women's -57 kg
Vikas B. K.	000–100	Lin Chong-you	Men's -73 kg

=== Quarterfinals ===
South Korea	4–1	China

Kim Min-jong	002–000	Li Haiyang	Men's +90 kg
Huh Mi-mi	100–000	Tao Yuying	Women's -57 kg
An Jae-hong	100–000	Lin Gaohui	Men's -73 kg
Kim Hye-mi	000–100	Tang Jing	Women's -70 kg
Kim Jong-hoon	100–000	Han Qi	Men's -90 kg

Kazakhstan	4–2	Kyrgyzstan

Yerassyl Kazhibayev	100–000	Daut Poltushev	Men's +90 kg
Dana Abdirova	001–000	Zhanar Zholdosheva	Women's -57 kg
Bakhitzhan Abdurakhmanov	000–001	Nurmukhhammed Bakirdinov	Men's -73 kg
Azhar Askhat	001–000	Adina Kochkonbaeva	Women's -70 kg
Aidar Arapov	000–001	Tegin Almazjan Uulu	Men's -90 kg
Aida Toishibekova	100–000	Aidemi Kalyeva	Women's +70 kg

Mongolia	4–2	Chinese Taipei

Ösökhbayaryn Perenleijamts	100–000	Dai You-ming	Men's +90 kg
Ganbaataryn Narantsetseg	000–010	Liu Tzu-yun	Women's -57 kg
Jambalyn Gansüren	111–000	Lin Chong-you	Men's -73 kg
Uran-Ölziin Anujin	000–101	Liao Yu-jung	Women's -70 kg
Jügdergaravyn Enkhtör	110–000	Chen Peng-yu	Men's -90 kg
Dambadarjaagiin Nominzul	100–000	Chang Ling-fang	Women's +70 kg

Japan	4–1	Uzbekistan

Yuta Nakamura	010–002	Muzaffarbek Turoboyev	Men's +90 kg
Moa Ono	001–000	Shukurjon Aminova	Women's -57 kg
Tatsuki Ishihara	100–000	Shakhram Ahadov	Men's -73 kg
Utana Terada	000–001	Shirinjon Yuldoshova	Women's -70 kg
Riku Okada	001–000	Nurbek Murtozoev	Men's -90 kg

=== Repechage ===
China	4–1	Kyrgyzstan

Tao Yuying	010–100	Zhanar Zholdosheva	Women's -57 kg
Lin Gaohui	001–000	Nurmukhhammed Bakirdinov	Men's -73 kg
Zhang Wen	100–000	Adina Kochkonbaeva	Women's -70 kg
Han Qi	110–010	Tegin Almazjan Uulu	Men's -90 kg
Niu Xinran	101–000	Aidemi Kalyeva	Women's +70 kg

Chinese Taipei	0–4	Uzbekistan

Liu Tzu-yun	000–101	Shukurjon Aminova	Women's -57 kg
Lin Chong-you	000–100	Shakhram Ahadov	Men's -73 kg
Liao Yu-jung	000–101	Shirinjon Yuldoshova	Women's -70 kg
Chen Peng-yu	010–102	Arslonbek Tojiev	Men's -90 kg

=== Semifinals ===
South Korea	3–4	Kazakhstan

Huh Mi-mi	100–000	Dana Abdirova	Women's -57 kg
Lee Eun-kyul	000–001	Gusman Kyrgyzbayev	Men's -73 kg
Kim Hye-mi	001–000	Azhar Askhat	Women's -70 kg
Kim Jong-hoon	000–010	Aidar Arapov	Men's -90 kg
Kim Ha-yun	100–000	Aida Toishibekova	Women's +70 kg
Kim Min-jong	000–010	Marat Baikamurov	Men's +90 kg
Kim Ha-yun	000–100	Aida Toishibekova	Decision contest (Women's +70 kg)

Mongolia	0–4	Japan

Ganbaataryn Narantsetseg	000–100	Moa Ono	Women's -57 kg
Jambalyn Gansüren	001–111	Tatsuki Ishihara	Men's -73 kg
Uran-Ölziin Anujin	000–100	Utana Terada	Women's -70 kg
Jügdergaravyn Enkhtör	000–100	Hidetoshi Tokumochi	Men's -90 kg

=== Bronze medal contests ===
China	4–2	Mongolia

Lin Gaohui	000–110	Jambalyn Gansüren	Men's -73 kg
Zhang Wen	110–000	Uran-Ölziin Anujin	Women's -70 kg
Han Qi	100–000	Jügdergaravyn Enkhtör	Men's -90 kg
Niu Xinran	110–000	Dambadarjaagiin Nominzul	Women's +70 kg
Li Haiyang	000–100	Ösökhbayaryn Perenleijamts	Men's +90 kg
Tao Yuying	100–000	Ganbaataryn Narantsetseg	Women's -57 kg

Uzbekistan	4–2	South Korea

Shakhram Ahadov	001–000	Lee Eun-kyul	Men's -73 kg
Shirinjon Yuldoshova	100–000	Kim Hye-mi	Women's -70 kg
Arslonbek Tojiev	000–010	Kim Jong-hoon	Men's -90 kg
Iriskhon Kurbanbaeva	000–100	Lee Hyeon-ji	Women's +70 kg
Muzaffarbek Turoboyev	100–000	Kim Min-jong	Men's +90 kg
Shukurjon Aminova	010–000	Huh Mi-mi	Women's -57 kg

=== Gold medal contest ===
Kazakhstan	0–4	Japan

Gusman Kyrgyzbayev	000–001	Tatsuki Ishihara	Men's -73 kg
Azhar Askhat	000–100	Utana Terada	Women's -70 kg
Aidar Arapov	001–100	Hidetoshi Tokumochi	Men's -90 kg
Aida Toishibekova	000–100	Miki Mukunoki	Women's +70 kg

== Non-participating athletes ==
- Huang Fuchun (CHN)
- Xue Ziyang (CHN)
- Shi Zhenyu (CHN)
- Wu Hongtao (CHN)
- Xu Aoyu (CHN)
- Mio Shirakane (JPN)
- Narumi Tanioka (JPN)
- Mizuki Sugimura (JPN)
- Shinsei Hattori (JPN)
- Hyōga Ōta (JPN)
- Adilet Almat (KAZ)
- Esmigul Kuyulova (KAZ)
- Ekaterina Tokareva (KAZ)
- Meruyert Sarsenova (KAZ)
- Emirkhan Zholdoshkaziev (KGZ)
- Alina Moldokulova (KGZ)
- Aiganysh Dzhumalieva (KGZ)
- Kubanychbek Aibek Uulu (KGZ)
- Tugol Kanatbek Uulu (KGZ)
- Erlan Sherov (KGZ)
- Kim Jae-min (KOR)
- Han Ju-yeop (KOR)
- Kim Ji-su (KOR)
- Shin Yu-na (KOR)
- Amarsaikhany Adiyaasüren (MGL)
- Lkhamaagiin Enkhdöl (MGL)
- Tserenbatyn Gan-Erdene (MGL)
- Batkhuyagiin Gonchigsüren (MGL)
- Lkhagvatogoogiin Enkhriilen (MGL)
- Punam Shrestha (NEP)
- Vishesh B. K. (NEP)
- Kittipong Hantratin (THA)
- Yang Yung-wei (TPE)
- Yuan Pei-chun (TPE)
- Hsu Wang Shu-huei (TPE)
- Lin Chen-hao (TPE)
- Abdurakhim Nutfulloev (UZB)
- Ernazar Sarsenbaev (UZB)
- Sita Kadamboeva (UZB)
- Khurshida Razzokberdieva (UZB)
- Umida Nigmatova (UZB)
