= Shakhram Ahadov =

Uzbekistani judoka (born 1996)

Personal information
- Born: 21 September 1996 (age 30)
- Occupation: Judoka

Sport
- Country: Uzbekistan
- Sport: Judo
- Weight class: ‍–‍66 kg, ‍–‍73 kg

Achievements and titles
- World Champ.: R16 (2019, 2022, 2024, 2025)
- Asian Champ.: (gold) (2025)
- Highest world ranking: 1^{st}
Medal record
Men's judo
Representing Uzbekistan
World Championships
Bronze medal – third place	2026 Baku	Mixed team
Asian Games
Silver medal – second place	2026 Aichi‑Nagoya	‍–‍73 kg
Bronze medal – third place	2026 Aichi‑Nagoya	Mixed team
Asian Championships
Gold medal – first place	2025 Bangkok	‍–‍73 kg
World Masters
Silver medal – second place	2022 Jerusalem	‍–‍73 kg
IJF Grand Slam
Gold medal – first place	2023 Abu Dhabi	‍–‍73 kg
Gold medal – first place	2025 Paris	‍–‍73 kg
Silver medal – second place	2026 Tashkent	‍–‍73 kg
Bronze medal – third place	2022 Abu Dhabi	‍–‍73 kg
Bronze medal – third place	2023 Baku	‍–‍73 kg
Bronze medal – third place	2024 Paris	‍–‍73 kg
Bronze medal – third place	2024 Tashkent	‍–‍73 kg
Bronze medal – third place	2024 Antalya	‍–‍73 kg
Bronze medal – third place	2025 Tashkent	‍–‍73 kg
IJF Grand Prix
Gold medal – first place	2018 Tunis	‍–‍66 kg
Silver medal – second place	2025 Qingdao	‍–‍73 kg
Silver medal – second place	2026 Qingdao	‍–‍73 kg
Bronze medal – third place	2018 Tbilisi	‍–‍66 kg
Bronze medal – third place	2018 Tashkent	‍–‍66 kg
Bronze medal – third place	2019 Budapest	‍–‍66 kg
Islamic Solidarity Games
Gold medal – first place	2021 Konya	‍–‍73 kg
Silver medal – second place	2025 Riyadh	‍–‍73 kg

Profile at external databases
- IJF: 32479
- JudoInside.com: 118890
- Updated on 1 October 2026

Shakhram Ahadov (ru: Ахадов Шахрам, uzb: Shahram Ahadov born 21 September 1996) is an Uzbekistani judoka.

Ahadov won the gold medal in the ‍–‍66 kg category at the 2018 Judo Grand Prix Tunis, held in Tunisia.
