= Hidetoshi Tokumochi =

Japanese judoka

Personal information
- Born: 11 August 2002 (age 24)
- Occupation: Judoka

Sport
- Country: Japan
- Sport: Judo
- Weight class: ‍–‍90 kg
- Club: Keiyo Gas
Medal record
Men's judo
Representing Japan
Asian Games
Gold medal – first place	2026 Aichi‑Nagoya	Mixed team
IJF Grand Slam
Silver medal – second place	2026 Paris	‍–‍90 kg

Profile at external databases
- IJF: 87225
- JudoInside.com: 171012
- Updated on 10 October 2026

Hidetoshi Tokumochi (Japanese: 徳持英隼; born 11 August 2002) is a Japanese judoka who competes in the men's 90 kg category. He won a silver medal at the 2026 Paris Grand Slam and a gold medal in the mixed-team event at the 2026 Asian Games.

== Career ==
Tokumochi attended Sone Junior High School, Sotoku High School and Meiji University before joining Keiyo Gas. He competes in the men's 90 kg division.

In 2024, Tokumochi competed at the Tokyo Grand Slam, where he was eliminated in the second round. He also participated in the Upper Austria Grand Prix in March 2025, reaching the third round.

In November 2025, Tokumochi won the men's 90 kg title at the Kodokan Cup All-Japan Judo Championships by Weight Category. At the Tokyo Grand Slam the following month, he finished seventh.

In February 2026, Tokumochi reached the final of the Paris Grand Slam. He lost to fellow Japanese judoka Goki Tajima and finished with the silver medal. It was his first medal on the International Judo Federation World Judo Tour.

In April 2026, Tokumochi won the men's 90 kg title at the All-Japan Selected Judo Championships.

Tokumochi represented Japan in the mixed-team judo competition at the 2026 Asian Games in Aichi-Nagoya. He defeated Enkhtur Jugderjav of Mongolia in the semi-final and Aidar Arapov of Kazakhstan in the final, helping Japan win the gold medal.
