= Riku Okada =

Japanese judoka (born 2002)

Personal information
- Born: 26 May 2002 (age 24)
- Occupation: Judoka

Sport
- Country: Japan
- Sport: Judo
- Weight class: ‍–‍90 kg
Medal record
Men's judo
Representing Japan
Asian Games
Gold medal – first place	2026 Aichi‑Nagoya	‍–‍90 kg
Gold medal – first place	2026 Aichi‑Nagoya	Mixed team
IJF Grand Slam
Gold medal – first place	2025 Ulaanbaatar	‍–‍90 kg
Bronze medal – third place	2026 Tashkent	‍–‍90 kg
IJF Grand Prix
Bronze medal – third place	2025 Linz	‍–‍90 kg

Profile at external databases
- IJF: 65948
- JudoInside.com: 151230
- Updated on 4 October 2026

Riku Okada (岡田陸, Okada Riku; born 26 May 2002) is a Japanese judoka.

== Career ==
In July 2025, Okada competed at the 2025 Judo Grand Slam Ulaanbaatar and won his first career Judo Grand Slam gold medal in the –90 kg category.

In October 2026, he competed at the 2026 Asian Games and won a gold medal in the –90 kg category. He defeated the 2022 Asian Games gold medalist, Erlan Sherov, in the final. He also won a gold medal in the mixed team event.
