= Lavjargalyn Ankhzayaa =

Mongolian judoka (born 2000)

Personal information
- Native name: Лавжаргалын Анхзаяа
- Born: 30 January 2000 (age 26) Mongolia
- Occupation: Judoka
- Height: 174 cm (5 ft 9 in)

Sport
- Country: Mongolia
- Sport: Judo
- Weight class: ‍–‍73 kg

Achievements and titles
- World Champ.: (bronze) (2024)
Medal record
Men's judo
Representing Mongolia
World Championships
Bronze medal – third place	2024 Abu Dhabi	‍–‍73 kg
IJF Grand Slam
Gold medal – first place	2026 Ulaanbaatar	‍–‍73 kg
Bronze medal – third place	2025 Astana	‍–‍73 kg
Bronze medal – third place	2025 Ulaanbaatar	‍–‍73 kg
Bronze medal – third place	2026 Astana	‍–‍73 kg
IJF Grand Prix
Bronze medal – third place	2022 Almada	‍–‍73 kg

Profile at external databases
- IJF: 55433
- JudoInside.com: 141560
- Updated on 21 June 2026

Lavjargalyn Ankhzayaa (Mongolian: Лавжаргалын Анхзаяа; born 30 January 2000) is a Mongolian judoka. He was a bronze medalist at the 2024 World Championships.

== Career ==
Ankhzayaa competes in the 73 kg category. He finished in third place in the 2022 Grand Prix Almada. Ankhzayaa placed fifth in the 2023 Grand Slam Ulaanbaatar, held in his hometown. Having lost to Tatsuki Ishihara by seoi-nage in the semi-finals, Ankhzayaa won a bronze medal in the Men's 73kg category at the 2024 World Judo Championships in Abu Dhabi, besting Brazilian Daniel Cargnin in the bronze medal match.
