= Mio Shirakane =

Japanese judoka (born 2005)

Personal information
- Born: 23 November 2005 (age 20)
- Occupation: Judoka

Sport
- Country: Japan
- Sport: Judo
- Weight class: ‍–‍57 kg
- Club: University of Tsukuba
Medal record
Women's judo
Representing Japan
Asian Games
Gold medal – first place	2026 Aichi‑Nagoya	Mixed team
Bronze medal – third place	2026 Aichi‑Nagoya	‍–‍57 kg
IJF Grand Slam
Silver medal – second place	2026 Tashkent	‍–‍57 kg
Bronze medal – third place	2025 Tokyo	‍–‍57 kg
World Juniors Championships
Gold medal – first place	2025 Lima	‍–‍57 kg

Profile at external databases
- IJF: 75383
- JudoInside.com: 161763
- Updated on 10 October 2026

Mio Shirakane (Japanese: 白金未桜; born 23 November 2005) is a Japanese judoka who competes in the women's 57 kg category. Representing the University of Tsukuba, she won the gold medal at the 2025 World Junior Championships and a bronze medal in the women's 57 kg event at the 2026 Asian Games.

== Career ==
Shirakane represents the University of Tsukuba and competes in the women's 57 kg category. In May 2023, she won the women's 57 kg event at the Paris Junior European Cup. She subsequently won the same weight category at the All-Japan Junior Judo Championships in September 2024.

In October 2024, Shirakane competed at the World Junior Championships in Dushanbe, Tajikistan, where she was eliminated in the second round. She won the All-Japan Junior Judo Championships again in 2025 before claiming the women's 57 kg title at the World Junior Championships in Lima, Peru, in October that year.

Shirakane made progress on the senior international circuit in 2025 and 2026. She won the bronze medal at the Tokyo Grand Slam in December 2025 and the silver medal at the Tashkent Grand Slam in February 2026.

At the 2026 Asian Games in Aichi-Nagoya, Japan, Shirakane won the bronze medal in the women's 57 kg event on 30 September. She was also listed among the Japanese judoka selected for the mixed-team competition, held on 3 October, when Japan won the gold medal.
