= Muzaffarbek Turoboyev =

Uzbekistani judoka (born 2000)

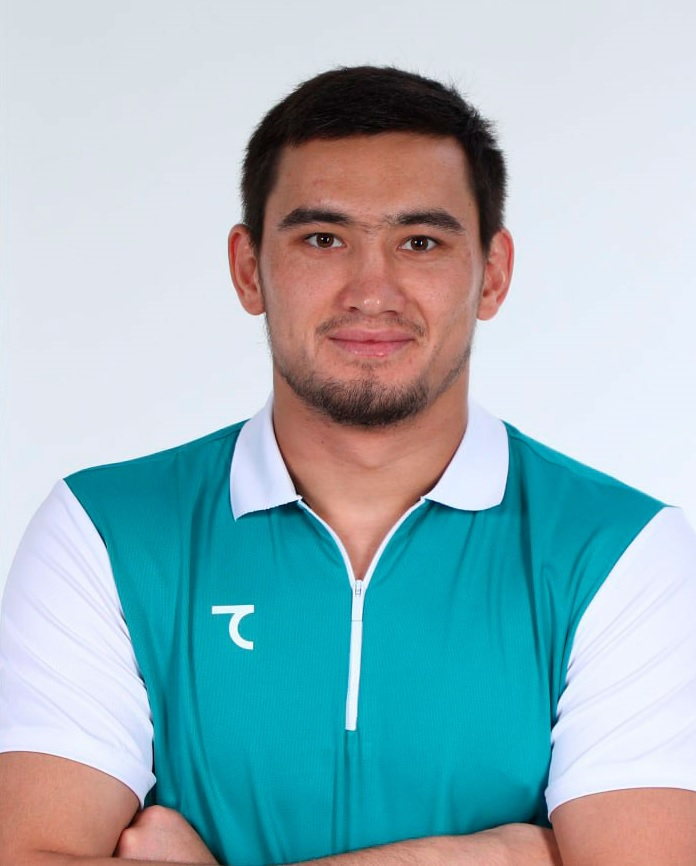
- Turoboyev in 2023

Personal information
- Nationality: Uzbek
- Born: 5 April 2000 (age 26) Boysun District, Uzbekistan
- Occupation: Judoka

Sport
- Country: Uzbekistan
- Sport: Judo
- Weight class: ‍–‍100 kg

Achievements and titles
- Olympic Games: (bronze) (2024)
- World Champ.: (gold) (2022)
- Asian Champ.: (gold) (2023, 2024)
Medal record
Men's judo
Representing Uzbekistan
Olympic Games
Bronze medal – third place	2024 Paris	‍–‍100 kg
World Championships
Gold medal – first place	2022 Tashkent	‍–‍100 kg
Bronze medal – third place	2021 Budapest	Mixed team
Bronze medal – third place	2026 Baku	Mixed team
Asian Games
Gold medal – first place	2023 Hangzhou	‍–‍100 kg
Gold medal – first place	2026 Aichi‑Nagoya	+100 kg
Bronze medal – third place	2026 Aichi‑Nagoya	Mixed team
Asian Championships
Gold medal – first place	2024 Hong Kong	‍–‍100 kg
Bronze medal – third place	2021 Bishkek	‍–‍100 kg
Bronze medal – third place	2026 Ordos	+100 kg
World Masters
Gold medal – first place	2023 Budapest	‍–‍100 kg
IJF Grand Slam
Gold medal – first place	2024 Tashkent	‍–‍100 kg
Bronze medal – third place	2021 Tashkent	‍–‍100 kg
Bronze medal – third place	2021 Tbilisi	‍–‍100 kg
Bronze medal – third place	2022 Paris	‍–‍100 kg
Asian Cadet Championships
Bronze medal – third place	2017 Bishkek	‍–‍81 kg
Islamic Solidarity Games
Gold medal – first place	2022 Konya	‍–‍100 kg

Profile at external databases
- IJF: 38880
- JudoInside.com: 115925
- Updated on 2 October 2026

Muzaffarbek Turoboyev (born 5 April 2000) is an Uzbekistani judoka.

== Career ==
He won the gold medal at the 2022 World Judo Championships, a bronze medal at the 2021 World Judo Championships, and a bronze medal at the 2024 Summer Olympics.
