= Judo at the 2026 Asian Games – Women's 52 kg =

Judo competition

Judo Women's 52 kg at the 2026 Asian Games
- Venue: Aichi International Arena
- Location: Nagoya, Japan

Medalists
gold medal	Sita Kadamboeva	Uzbekistan
silver medal	Jang Se-yun	South Korea
bronze medal	Xu Aoyu	China
bronze medal	Kokoro Fujishiro	Japan

The women's 52 kilograms (Half lightweight) competition in Judo at the 2026 Asian Games in Nagoya was held on 30 September 2026 at the Aichi International Arena.

== Schedule ==
All times are Japan Standard Time (UTC+09:00)

Date	Time	Event
Wednesday, 30 September 2026	11:00	Elimination round of 16
Wednesday, 30 September 2026	11:00	Quarterfinals
Wednesday, 30 September 2026	11:00	Repechage
Wednesday, 30 September 2026	11:00	Semifinals
Wednesday, 30 September 2026	17:00	Finals

== Results ==
=== Main bracket ===
==== Final ====
Final
Jang Se-yun (KOR)	000
Sita Kadamboeva (UZB)	100

==== Top half ====
Round of 16
Lâm Thị Ngân Hà (VIE)	001 (yellow card)
Debaki Maya Shrestha (NEP)	000 (yellow card)
Jang Se-yun (KOR)	100
Sabira Kozhomberdieva (KGZ)	000
Tsui Shuk Ki (HKG)	000 (yellow card)
Xu Aoyu (CHN)	001 (yellow card)

Quarter-finals
Kokoro Fujishiro (JPN)	111
Lâm Thị Ngân Hà (VIE)	000
Jang Se-yun (KOR)	100
Xu Aoyu (CHN)	000

Semi-finals
Kokoro Fujishiro (JPN)	000
Jang Se-yun (KOR)	100

==== Bottom half ====
Round of 16
Meruyert Sarsenova (KAZ)	100
Toukky Sengdakee (LAO)	000
Madina Qurbonzoda (TJK)	100 (yellow card)
Mahsa Shakibaei (IRI)	000 (yellow card)

Quarter-finals
Sita Kadamboeva (UZB)	001
Meruyert Sarsenova (KAZ)	000 (yellow card)
Bayanmönkhiin Uranzayaa (MGL)	100
Madina Qurbonzoda (TJK)	000

Semi-finals
Sita Kadamboeva (UZB)	001
Bayanmönkhiin Uranzayaa (MGL)	000 (yellow card)

=== Repechage ===
Repechage
Lâm Thị Ngân Hà (VIE)	000 (yellow card)
Xu Aoyu (CHN)	110
Meruyert Sarsenova (KAZ)	010
Madina Qurbonzoda (TJK)	000 (yellow card)

Bronze medal
Xu Aoyu (CHN)	010
Bayanmönkhiin Uranzayaa (MGL)	000 (yellow card)
Meruyert Sarsenova (KAZ)	000 (yellow card)
Kokoro Fujishiro (JPN)	010 (yellow card)
