= Moa Ono =

Japanese judoka

Personal information
- Native name: 大野 萌亜
- Born: 6 March 2004 (age 22)
- Education: Fukuoka University
- Occupation: Judoka

Sport
- Country: Japan
- Sport: Judo
- Weight class: ‍–‍57 kg
- Club: JR East
Medal record
Women's judo
Representing Japan
Asian Games
Gold medal – first place	2026 Aichi‑Nagoya	Mixed team
IJF Grand Slam
Silver medal – second place	2025 Tashkent	‍–‍57 kg
IJF Grand Prix
Silver medal – second place	2026 Linz	‍–‍57 kg
World University Games
Bronze medal – third place	2025 Rhine‑Ruhr	‍–‍57 kg

Profile at external databases
- IJF: 87231
- JudoInside.com: 167691
- Updated on 12 October 2026

Moa Ono (Japanese: 大野 萌亜; born 6 March 2004) is a Japanese judoka who competes in the women's 57 kg weight category. She represents Japan in international competitions and is affiliated with JR East. Her results include silver medals at the 2025 Tashkent Grand Slam and the 2026 Upper Austria Grand Prix, and bronze at the 2025 Summer World University Games. She also represented Japan in the mixed-team competition at the 2026 Asian Games, where the Japanese team won gold.

== Career ==
Ono attended Takuma Junior High School and Kumamoto Nishi High School before studying at Fukuoka University. She competes in the women's 57 kg division and is listed among the Japanese national team's athletes by the All Japan Judo Federation.

In September 2024, Ono finished second in the women's 57 kg category at the All-Japan Junior Judo Championships. She later won bronze at the Kodokan Cup in November 2024.

In February 2025, Ono won the silver medal in the women's 57 kg event at the Tashkent Grand Slam in Uzbekistan. In July, she won bronze at the Summer World University Games in the Rhine-Ruhr region of Germany.

In March 2026, Ono reached the final of the Upper Austria Grand Prix in Linz, finishing with the silver medal. The following month, she also finished second in the women's 57 kg division at the All-Japan Selected Judo Championships.

At the 2026 Asian Games in Aichi–Nagoya, Ono competed for Japan in the mixed-team judo event. She won her bouts in the quarter-final against Uzbekistan and the semi-final against Mongolia as Japan advanced to the final and secured the gold medal.
