= 2026 Judo Grand Slam Tashkent =

Judo competition

Judo 2026 Judo Grand Slam Tashkent
- Venue: Humo Arena
- Location: Tashkent, Uzbekistan
- Dates: 27 February – 1 March 2026
- Competitors: 370 from 39 nations
- Total prize money: €154,000

Competition at external databases
- Links: IJF • JudoInside

The 2026 Judo Grand Slam Tashkent was held at the Humo Arena in Tashkent, Uzbekistan, from 27 February to 1 March 2026 as part of the IJF World Tour.

== Medal summary ==
=== Men's events ===
Event	Gold	Silver	Bronze
Extra-lightweight (−60 kg)	Ahmad Yusifov (AZE)	Balabay Aghayev (AZE)	Taiki Nakamura (JPN)
Extra-lightweight (−60 kg)	Ahmad Yusifov (AZE)	Balabay Aghayev (AZE)	Doston Ruziev (UZB)
Half-lightweight (−66 kg)	Hifumi Abe (JPN)	Shinsei Hattori (JPN)	Nurali Emomali (TJK)
Half-lightweight (−66 kg)	Hifumi Abe (JPN)	Shinsei Hattori (JPN)	Abdullakh Parchiev (RUS)
Lightweight (−73 kg)	Orif Abdulloi (TJK)	Shakhram Ahadov (UZB)	Elbek Tojiev (UZB)
Lightweight (−73 kg)	Orif Abdulloi (TJK)	Shakhram Ahadov (UZB)	Shusuke Uchimura (JPN)
Half-middleweight (−81 kg)	Omar Rajabli (AZE)	Abdul-Kerim Tasuev (RUS)	Murodjon Yuldoshev (UZB)
Half-middleweight (−81 kg)	Omar Rajabli (AZE)	Abdul-Kerim Tasuev (RUS)	Sotaro Fujiwara (JPN)
Middleweight (−90 kg)	Murad Fatiyev (AZE)	Lasha Bekauri (GEO)	Kim Jong-hoon (KOR)
Middleweight (−90 kg)	Murad Fatiyev (AZE)	Lasha Bekauri (GEO)	Riku Okada (JPN)
Half-heavyweight (−100 kg)	Said Sadrudinov (BHR)	Ernazar Sarsenbaev (UZB)	Han Ju-yeop (KOR)
Half-heavyweight (−100 kg)	Said Sadrudinov (BHR)	Ernazar Sarsenbaev (UZB)	Zelym Kotsoiev (AZE)
Heavyweight (+100 kg)	Kanan Nasibov (AZE)	Alisher Yusupov (UZB)	Mikita Sviryd (CRO)
Heavyweight (+100 kg)	Kanan Nasibov (AZE)	Alisher Yusupov (UZB)	Dzhamal Gamzatkhanov (AZE)

=== Women's events ===
Event	Gold	Silver	Bronze
Extra-lightweight (−48 kg)	Hui Xinran (CHN)	Mizuki Harada (JPN)	Maria Celia Laborde (USA)
Extra-lightweight (−48 kg)	Hui Xinran (CHN)	Mizuki Harada (JPN)	Sachiyo Yoshino (JPN)
Half-lightweight (−52 kg)	Kokoro Fujishiro (JPN)	Bishreltiin Khorloodoi (UAE)	Odette Giuffrida (ITA)
Half-lightweight (−52 kg)	Kokoro Fujishiro (JPN)	Bishreltiin Khorloodoi (UAE)	Liliia Nugaeva (RUS)
Lightweight (−57 kg)	Shukurjon Aminova (UZB)	Mio Shirakane (JPN)	Jéssica Lima (BRA)
Lightweight (−57 kg)	Shukurjon Aminova (UZB)	Mio Shirakane (JPN)	Ana Viktorija Puljiz (CRO)
Half-middleweight (−63 kg)	Narumi Tanioka (JPN)	Catherine Beauchemin-Pinard (CAN)	Angelika Szymańska (POL)
Half-middleweight (−63 kg)	Narumi Tanioka (JPN)	Catherine Beauchemin-Pinard (CAN)	Manon Deketer (FRA)
Middleweight (−70 kg)	Miriam Butkereit (GER)	Melkia Auchecorne (FRA)	Clémence Eme (FRA)
Middleweight (−70 kg)	Miriam Butkereit (GER)	Melkia Auchecorne (FRA)	Elisavet Teltsidou (GRE)
Half-heavyweight (−78 kg)	Kaïla Issoufi (FRA)	Anna Monta Olek (GER)	Aleksandra Babintseva (RUS)
Half-heavyweight (−78 kg)	Kaïla Issoufi (FRA)	Anna Monta Olek (GER)	Mami Umeki (JPN)
Heavyweight (+78 kg)	Akira Sone (JPN)	Léa Fontaine (FRA)	Ruri Takahashi (JPN)
Heavyweight (+78 kg)	Akira Sone (JPN)	Léa Fontaine (FRA)	Umida Nigmatova (UZB)

=== Medal table ===
* Host nation (Uzbekistan)

Rank	Nation	Gold	Silver	Bronze	Total
1	Japan (JPN)	4	3	7	14
2	Azerbaijan (AZE)	4	1	2	7
3	Uzbekistan (UZB)*	1	3	4	8
4	France (FRA)	1	2	2	5
5	Germany (GER)	1	1	0	2
6	Tajikistan (TJK)	1	0	1	2
7	Bahrain (BHR)	1	0	0	1
7	China (CHN)	1	0	0	1
9	Russia (RUS)	0	1	3	4
10	Canada (CAN)	0	1	0	1
10	Georgia (GEO)	0	1	0	1
10	United Arab Emirates (UAE)	0	1	0	1
13	Croatia (CRO)	0	0	2	2
13	South Korea (KOR)	0	0	2	2
15	Brazil (BRA)	0	0	1	1
15	Greece (GRE)	0	0	1	1
15	Italy (ITA)	0	0	1	1
15	Poland (POL)	0	0	1	1
15	United States (USA)	0	0	1	1
Totals (19 entries)		14	14	28	56

== Prize money ==
The sums written are per medalist, bringing the total prizes awarded to €154,000. (retrieved from:)

Medal	Total	Judoka	Coach
Gold	€5,000	€4,000	€1,000
Silver	€3,000	€2,400	€600
Bronze	€1,500	€1,200	€300
