= Judo at the 2025 Summer World University Games – Mixed team =

Mixed team at the 2025 Summer World University Games
- Venue: Messe Essen
- Location: Essen
- Dates: 26 July
- Nations: 24

Medalists
gold medal	Japan
silver medal	France
bronze medal	Brazil
bronze medal	South Korea

The mixed team at the 2025 Summer World University Games in Rhine-Ruhr, Germany was held 26 July 2025. Japan captured the gold medal. France took home the silver medal. The bronze medals were awarded to Brazil and South Korea.

== Results ==
Teams advanced through direct knockout rounds—including the round of 32, round of 16, quarterfinals, and semifinals—to determine the two finalists fighting for the gold and silver medals. Parallel to the main bracket, a repechage system allowed defeated quarterfinalists to work their way back into the tournament, culminating in two separate bronze medal matches where the repechage winners faced the losing semifinalists.

Round of 32
Ecuador	0
Azerbaijan	4
Mongolia	0
Poland	4
Ukraine	4
Austria	2
Moldova	4
Hungary	1
United States	4
India	3
Turkey	2
Netherlands	4
Spain	4
Chinese Taipei	2
Kazakhstan	4
Czech Republic	0

Round of 16
Japan	4
Azerbaijan	0
Uzbekistan	4
Poland	1
Brazil	4
Ukraine	2
South Korea	4
Moldova	2
France	4
United States	0
Italy	2
Netherlands	4
Georgia	4
Spain	1
Germany	3
Kazakhstan	4

Quarter-finals
Japan	4
Uzbekistan	1
Brazil	0
South Korea	4
France	4
Netherlands	0
Georgia	3
Kazakhstan	4

Semi-finals
Japan	4
South Korea	2
France	4
Kazakhstan	2

Final
Japan	4
France	0

Repechage Phases

Repechage
Uzbekistan	3
Brazil	4
Netherlands	4
Georgia	3

Bronze medal
Brazil	4
Kazakhstan	2
Netherlands	0
South Korea	4
