= Tatsuki Ishihara =

Japanese judoka

Personal information
- Native name: 石原 樹
- Born: 26 June 2001 (age 25)
- Education: Nippon Sport Science University
- Occupation: Judoka

Sport
- Country: Japan
- Sport: Judo
- Weight class: ‍–‍73 kg
- Club: Japan Elevator Service

Achievements and titles
- World Champ.: (silver) (2024)
- Asian Champ.: (gold) (2024)
Medal record
Men's judo
Representing Japan
World Championships
Silver medal – second place	2024 Abu Dhabi	‍–‍73 kg
Bronze medal – third place	2025 Budapest	‍–‍73 kg
Asian Games
Gold medal – first place	2026 Aichi‑Nagoya	Mixed team
Bronze medal – third place	2026 Aichi‑Nagoya	‍–‍73 kg
Asian Championships
Gold medal – first place	2024 Hong Kong	‍–‍73 kg
IJF Grand Slam
Gold medal – first place	2024 Paris	‍–‍73 kg
Gold medal – first place	2025 Baku	‍–‍73 kg
Silver medal – second place	2024 Tokyo	‍–‍73 kg
Bronze medal – third place	2024 Abu Dhabi	‍–‍73 kg
IJF Grand Prix
Gold medal – first place	2026 Qingdao	‍–‍73 kg
World University Games
Gold medal – first place	2021 Chengdu	‍–‍73 kg

Profile at external databases
- IJF: 76915
- JudoInside.com: 142416
- Updated on 12 October 2026

Tatsuki Ishihara (Japanese: 石原 樹; born 26 June 2001) is a Japanese judoka who competes in the men's 73 kg weight category. He represents Japan in international competitions and is affiliated with Japan Elevator Service. He won silver at the 2024 World Judo Championships and bronze at the 2025 World Judo Championships. He also won the men's 73 kg title at the 2024 Asian Judo Championships and bronze at the 2026 Asian Games.

== Career ==
Ishihara attended Nippon Sport Science University and competes in the men's 73 kg division. In 2023, he won the men's 73 kg event at the Summer World University Games in Chengdu, China. He also won the All-Japan Selected Judo Championships and the Kodokan Cup in 2023.

In February 2024, Ishihara won the men's 73 kg title at the Paris Grand Slam. In April, he won gold at the Asian Judo Championships in Hong Kong, defeating Uzbekistan's Murodjon Yuldoshev in the final. The following month, he won the silver medal at the World Judo Championships in Abu Dhabi, finishing behind Azerbaijan's Hidayat Heydarov.

Later in 2024, Ishihara won bronze at the Abu Dhabi Grand Slam and silver at the Tokyo Grand Slam. In February 2025, he won the men's 73 kg competition at the Baku Grand Slam. At the World Judo Championships in Budapest in June 2025, he won bronze after defeating Italy's Giovanni Esposito in the bronze-medal contest.

At the 2026 Asian Games in Aichi–Nagoya, Japan, Ishihara won the bronze medal in the men's 73 kg event. He also competed in the mixed-team event, helping Japan win the gold medal. He won his bouts against Uzbekistan, Mongolia and Kazakhstan during Japan's run to the title.
