= 2025 Judo Grand Prix Linz =

Judo competition

Judo 2025 Judo Grand Prix Linz
- Venue: TipsArena Linz
- Location: Linz, Austria
- Dates: 7–9 March 2025
- Competitors: 416 from 52 nations
- Total prize money: €98,000

Competition at external databases
- Links: IJF • JudoInside

The 2025 Judo Grand Prix Linz was held at the TipsArena Linz in Linz, Austria, from 7 to 9 March 2025 as part of the IJF World Tour.

== Medal summary ==
=== Men's events ===
Event	Gold	Silver	Bronze
Extra-lightweight (−60 kg)	Yamato Fukuda (JPN)	Yusei Adachi (JPN)	Michel Augusto (BRA)
Extra-lightweight (−60 kg)	Yamato Fukuda (JPN)	Yusei Adachi (JPN)	Luis Barroso López (ESP)
Half-lightweight (−66 kg)	Ronald Lima (BRA)	Shuntaro Fukuchi (JPN)	Kairi Kentoku (JPN)
Half-lightweight (−66 kg)	Ronald Lima (BRA)	Shuntaro Fukuchi (JPN)	Guy Gutman (ISR)
Lightweight (−73 kg)	Giovanni Esposito (ITA)	Dániel Szegedi (HUN)	Mardon Ravshanov (UZB)
Lightweight (−73 kg)	Giovanni Esposito (ITA)	Dániel Szegedi (HUN)	Chusniddin Karimov (CZE)
Half-middleweight (−81 kg)	Antonio Esposito (ITA)	Murodjon Yuldoshev (UZB)	Naoto Izawa (JPN)
Half-middleweight (−81 kg)	Antonio Esposito (ITA)	Murodjon Yuldoshev (UZB)	Bernd Fasching (AUT)
Middleweight (−90 kg)	Giorgi Jabniashvili (GEO)	Tato Grigalashvili (GEO)	Riku Okada (JPN)
Middleweight (−90 kg)	Giorgi Jabniashvili (GEO)	Tato Grigalashvili (GEO)	Marcelo Gomes (BRA)
Half-heavyweight (−100 kg)	Iván Felipe Silva Morales (CUB)	Krisztián Tóth (HUN)	Anton Savytskiy (UKR)
Half-heavyweight (−100 kg)	Iván Felipe Silva Morales (CUB)	Krisztián Tóth (HUN)	Riku Hirami (JPN)
Heavyweight (+100 kg)	Guram Tushishvili (GEO)	Lukáš Krpálek (CZE)	Jelle Snippe (NED)
Heavyweight (+100 kg)	Guram Tushishvili (GEO)	Lukáš Krpálek (CZE)	Yevheniy Balyevskyy (UKR)

=== Women's events ===
Event	Gold	Silver	Bronze
Extra-lightweight (−48 kg)	Abiba Abuzhakynova (KAZ)	Sachiyo Yoshino (JPN)	Laziza Haydarova (UZB)
Extra-lightweight (−48 kg)	Abiba Abuzhakynova (KAZ)	Sachiyo Yoshino (JPN)	Maria Celia Laborde (USA)
Half-lightweight (−52 kg)	Iroha Oi (JPN)	Distria Krasniqi (KOS)	Mascha Ballhaus (GER)
Half-lightweight (−52 kg)	Iroha Oi (JPN)	Distria Krasniqi (KOS)	Ariane Toro (ESP)
Lightweight (−57 kg)	Seija Ballhaus (GER)	Nika Tomc (SLO)	Shannon van de Meeberg (NED)
Lightweight (−57 kg)	Seija Ballhaus (GER)	Nika Tomc (SLO)	Mariana Esteves (GUI)
Half-middleweight (−63 kg)	Kaja Kajzer (SLO)	So Morichika (JPN)	Renata Zachová (CZE)
Half-middleweight (−63 kg)	Kaja Kajzer (SLO)	So Morichika (JPN)	Laura Fazliu (KOS)
Middleweight (−70 kg)	Aoife Coughlan (AUS)	Ida Eriksson (SWE)	Kaja Schuster (SLO)
Middleweight (−70 kg)	Aoife Coughlan (AUS)	Ida Eriksson (SWE)	Yoshino Takahashi (JPN)
Half-heavyweight (−78 kg)	Yuliia Kurchenko (UKR)	Emma Reid (GBR)	Metka Lobnik (SLO)
Half-heavyweight (−78 kg)	Yuliia Kurchenko (UKR)	Emma Reid (GBR)	Julie Hölterhoff (GER)
Heavyweight (+78 kg)	Célia Cancan (FRA)	Grace-Esther Mienandi Lahou (FRA)	Tina Radić (CRO)
Heavyweight (+78 kg)	Célia Cancan (FRA)	Grace-Esther Mienandi Lahou (FRA)	Miki Mukunoki (JPN)

=== Medal table ===
* Host nation (Austria)

Rank	Nation	Gold	Silver	Bronze	Total
1	Japan (JPN)	2	4	6	12
2	Georgia (GEO)	2	1	0	3
3	Italy (ITA)	2	0	0	2
4	Slovenia (SLO)	1	1	2	4
5	France (FRA)	1	1	0	2
6	Brazil (BRA)	1	0	2	3
6	Germany (GER)	1	0	2	3
6	Ukraine (UKR)	1	0	2	3
9	Australia (AUS)	1	0	0	1
9	Cuba (CUB)	1	0	0	1
9	Kazakhstan (KAZ)	1	0	0	1
12	Hungary (HUN)	0	2	0	2
13	Czech Republic (CZE)	0	1	2	3
13	Uzbekistan (UZB)	0	1	2	3
15	Kosovo (KOS)	0	1	1	2
16	Great Britain (GBR)	0	1	0	1
16	Sweden (SWE)	0	1	0	1
18	Netherlands (NED)	0	0	2	2
18	Spain (ESP)	0	0	2	2
20	Austria (AUT)*	0	0	1	1
20	Croatia (CRO)	0	0	1	1
20	Guinea (GUI)	0	0	1	1
20	Israel (ISR)	0	0	1	1
20	United States (USA)	0	0	1	1
Totals (24 entries)		14	14	28	56

== Prize money ==
The sums written are per medalist, bringing the total prizes awarded to €98,000. (retrieved from:)

Medal	Total	Judoka	Coach
Gold	€3,000	€2,400	€600
Silver	€2,000	€1,600	€400
Bronze	€1,000	€800	€200
