= 2025 Judo Grand Slam Abu Dhabi =

Judo Competition

Judo 2025 Judo Grand Slam Abu Dhabi
- Venue: Mubadala Arena
- Location: Abu Dhabi, United Arab Emirates
- Dates: 28–30 November 2025
- Competitors: 373 from 52 nations
- Total prize money: €154,000

Competition at external databases
- Links: IJF • JudoInside

The 2025 Judo Grand Slam Abu Dhabi is a Judo Grand Slam tournament that was held at the Mubadala Arena in Abu Dhabi, United Arab Emirates from 28 to 30 November 2025 as part of the IJF World Tour.

== Medal summary ==
=== Men's events ===
| Event | Gold | Silver | Bronze |
|---|---|---|---|
| Extra-lightweight (−60 kg) | Ayub Bliev (RUS) | Enkhtaivany Ariunbold (MGL) | Giorgi Sardalashvili (GEO) |
| Extra-lightweight (−60 kg) | Ayub Bliev (RUS) | Enkhtaivany Ariunbold (MGL) | Salih Yıldız (TUR) |
| Half-lightweight (−66 kg) | Walide Khyar (FRA) | Murad Chopanov (RUS) | Elios Manzi (ITA) |
| Half-lightweight (−66 kg) | Walide Khyar (FRA) | Murad Chopanov (RUS) | Adrián Nieto (ESP) |
| Lightweight (−73 kg) | Nils Stump (SUI) | Muhiddin Asadulloev (TJK) | Daniel Cargnin (BRA) |
| Lightweight (−73 kg) | Nils Stump (SUI) | Muhiddin Asadulloev (TJK) | Makhmadbek Makhmadbekov (UAE) |
| Half-middleweight (−81 kg) | François Gauthier-Drapeau (CAN) | Abdul-Kerim Tasuev (RUS) | Sunatullo Musoev (TJK) |
| Half-middleweight (−81 kg) | François Gauthier-Drapeau (CAN) | Abdul-Kerim Tasuev (RUS) | Victor Sterpu (MDA) |
| Middleweight (−90 kg) | Lasha Bekauri (GEO) | Mihail Latișev (MDA) | Islam Šogenov (SRB) |
| Middleweight (−90 kg) | Lasha Bekauri (GEO) | Mihail Latișev (MDA) | Nemanja Majdov (SRB) |
| Half-heavyweight (−100 kg) | Arman Adamian (RUS) | Idar Bifov (RUS) | Nikoloz Sherazadishvili (ESP) |
| Half-heavyweight (−100 kg) | Arman Adamian (RUS) | Idar Bifov (RUS) | Leonardo Gonçalves (BRA) |
| Heavyweight (+100 kg) | Batkhuyagiin Gonchigsüren (MGL) | Tamerlan Bashaev (RUS) | Ushangi Kokauri (AZE) |
| Heavyweight (+100 kg) | Batkhuyagiin Gonchigsüren (MGL) | Tamerlan Bashaev (RUS) | Irakli Demetrashvili (GEO) |

=== Women's events ===
| Event | Gold | Silver | Bronze |
|---|---|---|---|
| Extra-lightweight (−48 kg) | Laura Martínez (ESP) | Hui Xinran (CHN) | Abiba Abuzhakynova (KAZ) |
| Extra-lightweight (−48 kg) | Laura Martínez (ESP) | Hui Xinran (CHN) | Yua Mori (JPN) |
| Half-lightweight (−52 kg) | Mascha Ballhaus (GER) | Réka Pupp (HUN) | Odette Giuffrida (ITA) |
| Half-lightweight (−52 kg) | Mascha Ballhaus (GER) | Réka Pupp (HUN) | Distria Krasniqi (KOS) |
| Lightweight (−57 kg) | Huh Mi-mi (KOR) | Giulia Carnà (ITA) | Julie Beurskens (NED) |
| Lightweight (−57 kg) | Huh Mi-mi (KOR) | Giulia Carnà (ITA) | Marta García (ESP) |
| Half-middleweight (−63 kg) | Megu Danno (JPN) | Lkhagvatogoogiin Enkhriilen (MGL) | Rafaela Silva (BRA) |
| Half-middleweight (−63 kg) | Megu Danno (JPN) | Lkhagvatogoogiin Enkhriilen (MGL) | Carlotta Avanzato (ITA) |
| Middleweight (−70 kg) | Szofi Özbas (HUN) | Aoife Coughlan (AUS) | Margit de Voogd (NED) |
| Middleweight (−70 kg) | Szofi Özbas (HUN) | Aoife Coughlan (AUS) | Ida Eriksson (SWE) |
| Half-heavyweight (−78 kg) | Anna Monta Olek (GER) | Alice Bellandi (ITA) | Mizuki Sugimura (JPN) |
| Half-heavyweight (−78 kg) | Anna Monta Olek (GER) | Alice Bellandi (ITA) | Kaïla Issoufi (FRA) |
| Heavyweight (+78 kg) | Miki Mukunoki (JPN) | Niu Xinran (CHN) | Yuli Alma Mishiner (ISR) |
| Heavyweight (+78 kg) | Miki Mukunoki (JPN) | Niu Xinran (CHN) | Erica Simonetti (ITA) |

=== Medal table ===
* Host nation (United Arab Emirates)

| Rank | Nation | Gold | Silver | Bronze | Total |
|---|---|---|---|---|---|
| 1 | Russia (RUS) | 2 | 4 | 0 | 6 |
| 2 | Japan (JPN) | 2 | 0 | 2 | 4 |
| 3 | Germany (GER) | 2 | 0 | 0 | 2 |
| 4 | Mongolia (MGL) | 1 | 2 | 0 | 3 |
| 5 | Hungary (HUN) | 1 | 1 | 0 | 2 |
| 6 | Spain (ESP) | 1 | 0 | 3 | 4 |
| 7 | Georgia (GEO) | 1 | 0 | 2 | 3 |
| 8 | France (FRA) | 1 | 0 | 1 | 2 |
| 9 | Canada (CAN) | 1 | 0 | 0 | 1 |
| 9 | South Korea (KOR) | 1 | 0 | 0 | 1 |
| 9 | Switzerland (SUI) | 1 | 0 | 0 | 1 |
| 12 | Italy (ITA) | 0 | 2 | 4 | 6 |
| 13 | China (CHN) | 0 | 2 | 0 | 2 |
| 14 | Moldova (MDA) | 0 | 1 | 1 | 2 |
| 14 | Tajikistan (TJK) | 0 | 1 | 1 | 2 |
| 16 | Australia (AUS) | 0 | 1 | 0 | 1 |
| 17 | Brazil (BRA) | 0 | 0 | 3 | 3 |
| 18 | Netherlands (NED) | 0 | 0 | 2 | 2 |
| 18 | Serbia (SRB) | 0 | 0 | 2 | 2 |
| 20 | Azerbaijan (AZE) | 0 | 0 | 1 | 1 |
| 20 | Israel (ISR) | 0 | 0 | 1 | 1 |
| 20 | Kazakhstan (KAZ) | 0 | 0 | 1 | 1 |
| 20 | Kosovo (KOS) | 0 | 0 | 1 | 1 |
| 20 | Sweden (SWE) | 0 | 0 | 1 | 1 |
| 20 | Turkey (TUR) | 0 | 0 | 1 | 1 |
| 20 | United Arab Emirates (UAE)* | 0 | 0 | 1 | 1 |
| Totals (26 entries) | | 14 | 14 | 28 | 56 |

== Prize money ==
The sums written are per medalist, bringing the total prizes awarded to €154,000. (retrieved from:)

| Medal | Total | Judoka | Coach |
|---|---|---|---|
| Gold | €5,000 | €4,000 | €1,000 |
| Silver | €3,000 | €2,400 | €600 |
| Bronze | €1,500 | €1,200 | €300 |
