= Yerassyl Kazhibayev =

Kazakhstani judoka (born 1994)

Personal information
- Born: 4 July 1994 (age 32)
- Occupation: Judoka

Sport
- Country: Kazakhstan
- Sport: Judo
- Weight class: +100 kg

Achievements and titles
- World Champ.: R16 (2018, 2021)
- Asian Champ.: 5th (2021)
Medal record
Men's judo
Representing Kazakhstan
Asian Games
Silver medal – second place	2018 Jakarta	Mixed team
Silver medal – second place	2026 Aichi‑Nagoya	Mixed team
IJF Grand Slam
Silver medal – second place	2025 Astana	+100 kg
Bronze medal – third place	2023 Baku	+100 kg
Bronze medal – third place	2025 Baku	+100 kg
IJF Grand Prix
Silver medal – second place	2019 Marrakesh	+100 kg
Bronze medal – third place	2018 Tashkent	+100 kg
Bronze medal – third place	2023 Dushanbe	+100 kg

Profile at external databases
- IJF: 24220
- JudoInside.com: 94081
- Updated on 11 May 2025

Yerassyl Kazhibayev (born 4 July 1994) is a Kazakhstani judoka.

Kazhibayev is the silver medalist of the 2019 Judo Grand Prix Marrakesh in the +100 kg category.
