= Kosovo at the 2025 Summer World University Games =

- Flag of Kosovo
- IOC code: KOS
- National federation: Kosova University Sports Federation

in Rhine-Ruhr, Germany 16 July 2025 – 27 July 2025
- Competitors: 4 in 2 sports
- Medals Ranked 48th: Gold 0 Silver 1 Bronze 0 Total 1

Summer World University Games appearances
- 1959; 1961; 1963; 1965; 1967; 1970; 1973; 1975; 1977; 1979; 1981; 1983; 1985; 1987; 1989; 1991; 1993; 1995; 1997; 1999; 2001; 2003; 2005; 2007; 2009; 2011; 2013; 2015; 2017; 2019; 2021; 2025; 2027

Kosovo competed at the 2025 Summer World University Games in Rhine-Ruhr, Germany held from 16 to 27 July 2025. Kosovo was represented by 4 athletes and took forty-eighth place in the medal table with one medal. Laura Fazliu won Kosovo's first medal at the World University Games.

== Medal summary ==
=== Medal by sports ===
| Rank | Sports | Gold | Silver | Bronze | Total |
|---|---|---|---|---|---|
| 1 | Judo | 0 | 1 | 0 | 1 |
| Totals (1 entries) | | 0 | 1 | 0 | 1 |

Source: rhineruhr2025.com

=== Medalists ===
| Medal | Name | Sport | Event | Date |
|---|---|---|---|---|
| Silver | Laura Fazliu | Judo | Women -63 kg | 24 July |
