= Huh Mi-mi =

South Korean judoka (born 2002)

Personal information
- Born: 19 December 2002 (age 23)
- Occupation: Judoka

Sport
- Country: South Korea
- Sport: Judo
- Weight class: ‍–‍57 kg

Achievements and titles
- Olympic Games: (silver) (2024)
- World Champ.: (gold) (2024)
- Asian Champ.: (silver) (2024)
Medal record
Women's judo
Representing South Korea
Olympic Games
Silver medal – second place	2024 Paris	‍–‍57 kg
Bronze medal – third place	2024 Paris	Mixed team
World Championships
Gold medal – first place	2024 Abu Dhabi	‍–‍57 kg
Silver medal – second place	2025 Budapest	Mixed team
Asian Games
Gold medal – first place	2026 Aichi‑Nagoya	‍–‍57 kg
Asian Championships
Silver medal – second place	2024 Hong Kong	‍–‍57 kg
World Masters
Bronze medal – third place	2022 Jerusalem	‍–‍57 kg
IJF Grand Slam
Gold medal – first place	2022 Tbilisi	‍–‍57 kg
Gold medal – first place	2022 Abu Dhabi	‍–‍57 kg
Gold medal – first place	2025 Abu Dhabi	‍–‍57 kg
Bronze medal – third place	2023 Ulaanbaatar	‍–‍57 kg
Bronze medal – third place	2026 Abu Dhabi	‍–‍57 kg
IJF Grand Prix
Gold medal – first place	2023 Almada	‍–‍57 kg
Gold medal – first place	2023 Perth	‍–‍57 kg
Gold medal – first place	2024 Odivelas	‍–‍57 kg
World University Games
Gold medal – first place	2021 Chengdu	‍–‍57 kg
Gold medal – first place	2025 Rhine‑Ruhr	‍–‍57 kg
Bronze medal – third place	2021 Chengdu	Women's team
Bronze medal – third place	2025 Rhine‑Ruhr	Mixed team
Asian Junior Championships
Bronze medal – third place	2019 Taipei	‍–‍57 kg

Profile at external databases
- IJF: 56048
- JudoInside.com: 141557
- Updated on 29 October 2026

Mi-mi Huh (Korean: 허미미; born 19 December 2002) is a South Korean judoka. She won a gold medal in ‍–‍57 kg, at the 2022 Judo Grand Slam Tbilisi, and the 2022 Judo Grand Slam Abu Dhabi.

Huh competed at the 2019 World Judo Juniors Championships. She placed fifth at the 2022 and 2023 World Championships.

Huh was born in Tokyo, Japan to a Korean father and Japanese mother. In 2021, she began competing for South Korea.
