= Cyprus at the 2025 Summer World University Games =

- Flag of Cyprus
- IOC code: CYP
- National federation: Cyprus University Sports Federation

in Rhine-Ruhr, Germany 16 July 2025 – 27 July 2025
- Competitors: 27 in 6 sports
- Medals Ranked 53rd: Gold 0 Silver 0 Bronze 2 Total 2

Summer World University Games appearances
- 1959; 1961; 1963; 1965; 1967; 1970; 1973; 1975; 1977; 1979; 1981; 1983; 1985; 1987; 1989; 1991; 1993; 1995; 1997; 1999; 2001; 2003; 2005; 2007; 2009; 2011; 2013; 2015; 2017; 2019; 2021; 2025; 2027

Cyprus competed at the 2025 Summer World University Games in Rhine-Ruhr, Germany held from 16 to 27 July 2025. Cyprus was represented by 27 athletes and took fifty-third place in the medal table with two medals.

== Medal summary ==
=== Medal by sports ===
Rank	Sports	Gold	Silver	Bronze	Total
1	Athletics	0	0	1	1
1	Judo	0	0	1	1
Totals (2 entries)		0	0	2	2

Source: rhineruhr2025.com

=== Medalists ===
Medal	Name	Sport	Event	Date
Bronze	Giannis Antoniou	Judo	Men +100 kg	25 July
Bronze	Elena Kulichenko	Athletics	Women's high jump	26 July
