= Shukurjon Aminova =

Uzbekistani judoka (born 2002)

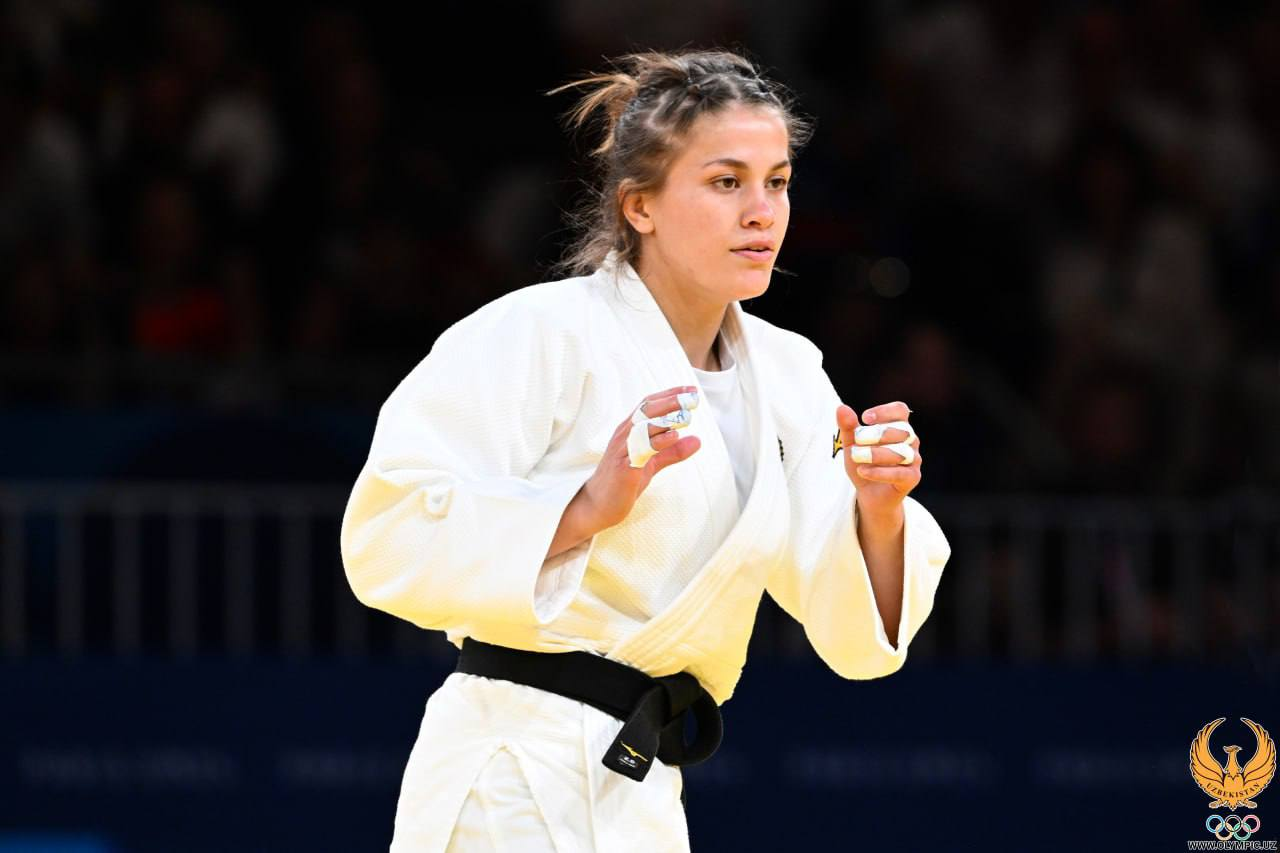

Personal information
- Born: 16 November 2002 (age 23)
- Occupation: Judoka

Sport
- Country: Uzbekistan
- Sport: Judo
- Weight class: ‍–‍57 kg

Achievements and titles
- Olympic Games: R16 (2024)
- World Champ.: 5th (2025)
- Asian Champ.: (bronze) (2025)
Medal record
Women's judo
Representing Uzbekistan
World Championships
Bronze medal – third place	2021 Budapest	Mixed team
Bronze medal – third place	2026 Baku	Mixed team
Asian Games
Silver medal – second place	2023 Hangzhou	Mixed team
Bronze medal – third place	2026 Aichi‑Nagoya	Mixed team
Asian Championships
Bronze medal – third place	2025 Bangkok	‍–‍57 kg
IJF Grand Slam
Gold medal – first place	2026 Tashkent	‍–‍57 kg
IJF Grand Prix
Gold medal – first place	2023 Dushanbe	‍–‍57 kg
Asian Cadet Championships
Silver medal – second place	2017 Chirchik	‍–‍44 kg
Bronze medal – third place	2017 Bishkek	‍–‍44 kg
Summer Universiade
Bronze medal – third place	2025 Rhine-Ruhr	‍–‍57 kg

Profile at external databases
- IJF: 39413
- JudoInside.com: 114439
- Updated on 3 March 2026

Shukurjon Aminova (born 16 November 2002) is an Uzbekistani judoka.

Aminova won a medal at the mixed team event of the 2021 World Judo Championships.
