= 2025 Asian Judo Championships =

Judo competition

2025 Judo Asian Judo Championships
- Venue: MCC Hall
- Location: Bangkok, Thailand
- Dates: 25–27 April 2025
- Competitors: 289 from 29 nations

Competition at external databases
- Links: IJF • JudoInside

The 2025 Asian Judo Championships were held from 25 to 27 April 2025 at the MCC Hall in Bangkok, Thailand as part of the IJF World Tour. The last day of competition featured a mixed team event.

== Medal summary ==
=== Men's events ===
Event	Gold	Silver	Bronze
Extra-lightweight (−60 kg)	Taiki Nakamura; Japan	Yang Yung-wei; Chinese Taipei	Muhammadsoleh Quvatov; Tajikistan
Extra-lightweight (−60 kg)	Taiki Nakamura; Japan	Yang Yung-wei; Chinese Taipei	Sherzod Davlatov; Kazakhstan
Half-lightweight (−66 kg)	Ryoma Tanaka; Japan	Zamohshari Bekmurodov; Uzbekistan	Nurali Emomali; Tajikistan
Half-lightweight (−66 kg)	Ryoma Tanaka; Japan	Zamohshari Bekmurodov; Uzbekistan	Obid Dzhebov; Tajikistan
Lightweight (−73 kg)	Shakhram Ahadov; Uzbekistan	Makhmadbek Makhmadbekov; United Arab Emirates	Abubakr Sherov; Tajikistan
Lightweight (−73 kg)	Shakhram Ahadov; Uzbekistan	Makhmadbek Makhmadbekov; United Arab Emirates	Yudai Tanaka; Japan
Half-middleweight (−81 kg)	Lee Joon-hwan; South Korea	Somon Makhmadbekov; Tajikistan	Yuhei Oino; Japan
Half-middleweight (−81 kg)	Lee Joon-hwan; South Korea	Somon Makhmadbekov; Tajikistan	Arslonbek Tojiev; Uzbekistan
Middleweight (−90 kg)	Shakhzodxuja Sharipov; Uzbekistan	Nurbek Murtozoev; Uzbekistan	Komei Kawabata; Japan
Middleweight (−90 kg)	Shakhzodxuja Sharipov; Uzbekistan	Nurbek Murtozoev; Uzbekistan	Meiirlan Maxim; Kazakhstan
Half-heavyweight (−100 kg)	Said Sadrudinov; Bahrain	Dzhafar Kostoev; United Arab Emirates	Caramnob Sagaipov; Lebanon
Half-heavyweight (−100 kg)	Said Sadrudinov; Bahrain	Dzhafar Kostoev; United Arab Emirates	Dzhakhongir Madzhidov; Tajikistan
Heavyweight (+100 kg)	Lee Seung-yeob; South Korea	Temur Rakhimov; Tajikistan	Emirkhan Zholdoshkaziev; Kyrgyzstan
Heavyweight (+100 kg)	Lee Seung-yeob; South Korea	Temur Rakhimov; Tajikistan	Kim Min-jong; South Korea

=== Women's events ===
Event	Gold	Silver	Bronze
Extra-lightweight (−48 kg)	Hikari Yoshioka; Japan	Hui Xinran; China	Galiya Tynbayeva; Kazakhstan
Extra-lightweight (−48 kg)	Hikari Yoshioka; Japan	Hui Xinran; China	Jon Su-song; North Korea
Half-lightweight (−52 kg)	Kokoro Fujishiro; Japan	Bishreltiin Khorloodoi; United Arab Emirates	Jang Se-yun; South Korea
Half-lightweight (−52 kg)	Kokoro Fujishiro; Japan	Bishreltiin Khorloodoi; United Arab Emirates	Zhang Yuanli; China
Lightweight (−57 kg)	Megumi Fuchida; Japan	Terbishiin Ariunzayaa; Mongolia	Shukurjon Aminova; Uzbekistan
Lightweight (−57 kg)	Megumi Fuchida; Japan	Terbishiin Ariunzayaa; Mongolia	Bakyt Kussakbayeva; Kazakhstan
Half-middleweight (−63 kg)	Haruka Kaju; Japan	Lkhagvatogoogiin Enkhriilen; Mongolia	Yuan Pei-chun; Chinese Taipei
Half-middleweight (−63 kg)	Haruka Kaju; Japan	Lkhagvatogoogiin Enkhriilen; Mongolia	Kim Ji-hye; North Korea
Middleweight (−70 kg)	Mayu Honda; Japan	Feng Yingying; China	Mun Song-hui; North Korea
Middleweight (−70 kg)	Mayu Honda; Japan	Feng Yingying; China	Batsuuriin Nyam-Erdene; Mongolia
Half-heavyweight (−78 kg)	Kurena Ikeda; Japan	Kim Min-ju; South Korea	Wu Hongtao; China
Half-heavyweight (−78 kg)	Kurena Ikeda; Japan	Kim Min-ju; South Korea	Marjona Kuchimova; Uzbekistan
Heavyweight (+78 kg)	Ayiman Jinesinuer; China	Niu Xinran; China	Amarsaikhany Adiyaasüren; Mongolia
Heavyweight (+78 kg)	Ayiman Jinesinuer; China	Niu Xinran; China	Lee Hyeon-ji; South Korea

=== Mixed events ===
Event	Gold	Silver	Bronze
Mixed team	Japan	Uzbekistan	South Korea
Mixed team	Japan	Uzbekistan	Mongolia

Source results:

=== Medal table ===
* Host nation (Thailand)

Rank	Nation	Gold	Silver	Bronze	Total
1	Japan (JPN)	9	0	3	12
2	Uzbekistan (UZB)	2	3	3	8
3	South Korea (KOR)	2	1	4	7
4	China (CHN)	1	3	2	6
5	Bahrain (BHR)	1	0	0	1
6	United Arab Emirates (UAE)	0	3	0	3
7	Tajikistan (TJK)	0	2	5	7
8	Mongolia (MGL)	0	2	3	5
9	Chinese Taipei (TPE)	0	1	1	2
10	Kazakhstan (KAZ)	0	0	4	4
11	North Korea (PRK)	0	0	3	3
12	Kyrgyzstan (KGZ)	0	0	1	1
12	Lebanon (LBN)	0	0	1	1
Totals (13 entries)		15	15	30	60
