= Uzbekistan at the 2025 Summer World University Games =

- Flag of Uzbekistan
- IOC code: UZB
- National federation: Uzbekistan Students’ Sport Association

in Rhine-Ruhr, Germany 16 July 2025 – 27 July 2025
- Competitors: 53 in 11 sports
- Medals Ranked 13th: Gold 4 Silver 4 Bronze 7 Total 15

Summer World University Games appearances
- 1959; 1961; 1963; 1965; 1967; 1970; 1973; 1975; 1977; 1979; 1981; 1983; 1985; 1987; 1989; 1991; 1993; 1995; 1997; 1999; 2001; 2003; 2005; 2007; 2009; 2011; 2013; 2015; 2017; 2019; 2021; 2025; 2027

Uzbekistan competed at the 2025 Summer World University Games in Rhine-Ruhr, Germany held from 16 to 27 July 2025. Uzbekistan was represented by 53 athletes and took thirteenth place in the medal table with 15 medals.

== Medal summary ==
=== Medal by sports ===
Rank	Sports	Gold	Silver	Bronze	Total
1	Rhythmic gymnastics	2	2	0	4
2	Taekwondo	1	1	4	6
3	Athletics	1	0	0	1
4	Swimming	0	1	1	2
5	Judo	0	0	2	2
Totals (5 entries)		4	4	7	15

Source: rhineruhr2025.com

=== Medalists ===
Medal	Name	Sport	Event	Date
Gold	Takhmina Ikromova	Rhythmic gymnastics	Individual ribbon	19 July
Gold	Takhmina Ikromova	Rhythmic gymnastics	Individual hoop	19 July
Gold	Diyorakhon Azizova; Shokhjakhon Karimboev; Najmiddin Kosimkhojiev; Madina Mirabzalova	Taekwondo	Mixed team kyorugi	23 July
Gold	Sharifa Davronova	Athletics	Women's triple jump	27 July
Silver	Takhmina Ikromova	Rhythmic gymnastics	Individual all-around	18 July
Silver	Eldor Usmonov	Swimming	Men's 50m butterfly	18 July
Silver	Takhmina Ikromova	Rhythmic gymnastics	Individual clubs	19 July
Silver	Marat Mavlonov	Taekwondo	Men +87 kg	21 July
Bronze	Madina Mirabzalova	Taekwondo	Women -57 kg	19 July
Bronze	Shamsiddin Kurbonov	Taekwondo	Men -58 kg	20 July
Bronze	Najmiddin Kosimkhojiev	Taekwondo	Men -74 kg	21 July
Bronze	Eldor Usmonov	Swimming	Men's 100m butterfly	22 July
Bronze	Laziza Haydarova	Judo	Women -48 kg	23 July
Bronze	Shukurjon Aminova	Judo	Women -57 kg	23 July
Bronze	Shokhjakhon Akhmedov; Marat Mavlonov; Umidjon Turabov	Taekwondo	Men's team kyorugi	23 July
