= Messe Essen =

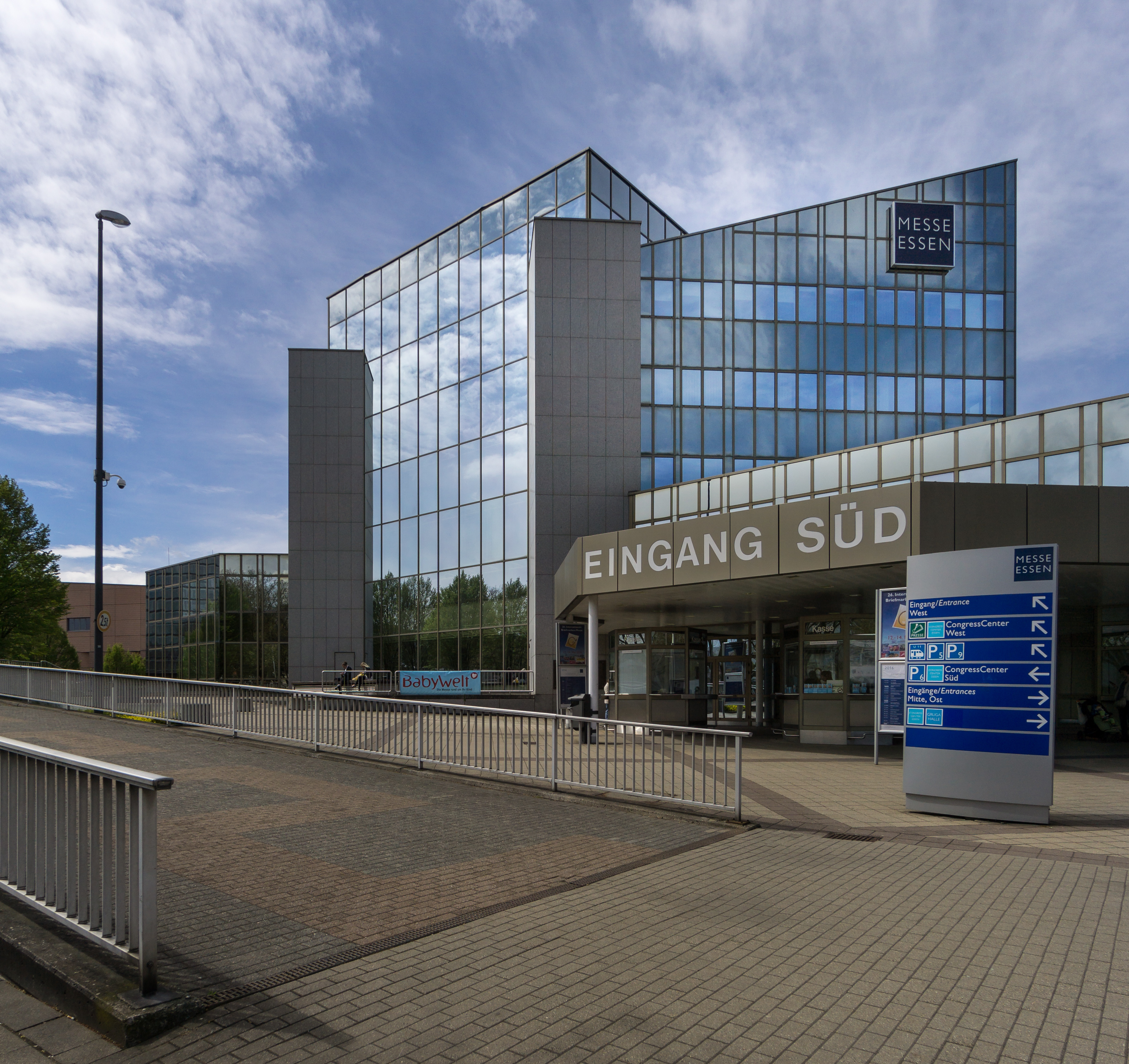
Entrance South of Messe Essen

The Messe Essen is the exhibition centre of the city of Essen, North Rhine-Westphalia, Germany. It is located in the Rüttenscheid borough near the Grugapark. It is the 9th largest exhibition centre in Germany.

== History ==
Though there had been a trade exhibition in the Saalbau Essen in 1893, the first real trade fair of the city was the Gewerbeschau Essen on 21 April 1913 near the Grugahalle. In 1921, an association was founded for the organization of the fairs. At the same time, Messehalle V was erected. Today, the Grugahalle stands on the foundation of this hall. In 1944, the Messe compound was destroyed by the allied bombings.

Exhibitions were resumed in 1949. In 1971, the operating company of Gemeinnützige Ausstellungsgesellschaft mbH was renamed the Ausstellungs- und Messegesellschaft mbH Essen (AMGE), since 1982 it is called Messe Essen GmbH. New halls were opened in 1983 and 1990. In 2000, Halle 3 went into operation. With a length of 230 meters, a width of 69 meters and a height of about 15 meters, it is considered as the longest free-spanning hall in Europe.

From 26 to 28 July 2013 the Star Wars Celebration Europe II took place at the Messe Essen. More than 20,000 people from over 40 countries attended it.

In 2014, the Essen citizens voted against plans for a complete reconstruction of the Messe Essen. Instead, it was then rebuilt to a smaller extent. Works are scheduled from 2016 to 2019 at a cost of around €88 million.

The Messe Essen is connected to public traffic of Stadtbahn Essen by the Messe Ost/Gruga station and the Messe West/Süd/Gruga station, as well as Federal Motorway 52 and Federal highway 224.

Messe Essen is the main site of the 2025 Rhine-Ruhr FISU University Games, hosting taekwondo, gymnastics, fencing, table tennis, and more.
