= Aichi International Arena =

Multi-purpose arena in Nagoya, Japan

Coordinates: 35.18998°N 136.90222°E

- 愛知国際アリーナ
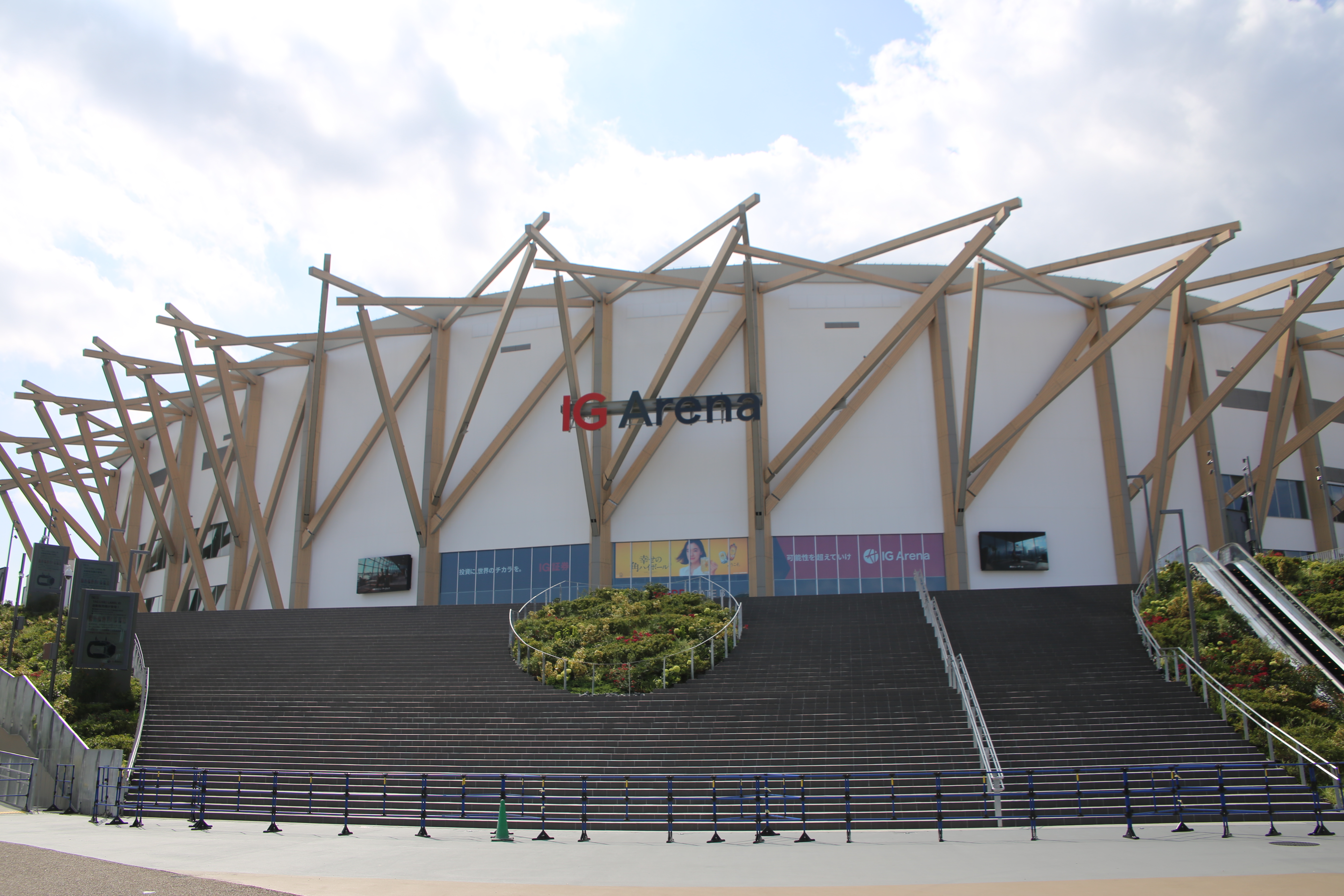
- Aichi International Arena in April 2025
- Interactive map of Aichi International Arena
- Location: 1-4-1 Meijō, Kita-ku, Nagoya, Aichi
- Operator: Aichi International Arena Co., Ltd
- Capacity: 17,000; 7,800 (sumo)

Construction
- Opened: July 13, 2025
- Architect: Kengo Kuma

Tenants
- 2026 Asian Games; Nagoya Diamond Dolphins (B.League)

Website
- https://ig-arena.jp/en/

Aichi International Arena (愛知国際アリーナ, Aichi Kokusai Arīna), also known as IG Arena (IGアリーナ, IG Arīna) for sponsorship reasons, is a multi-purpose arena in Kita-ku, Nagoya, Aichi Prefecture, Japan. Opened in July 2025, the arena is a replacement for the Aichi Prefectural Gymnasium, which was built in 1964.

== Overview ==
Aichi Prefectural Governor Hideaki Ōmura announced plans for the new arena in July 2017, almost a year after the prefecture and Nagoya city were unanimously selected to be the hosts of the 2026 Asian Games. A section of Meijō Park north of the Aichi Prefectural Gymnasium was chosen to build the new arena.

Designed by Japanese architect Kengo Kuma, Aichi International Arena has a maximum seating capacity of 17,000. The arena also hosts the annual grand sumo tournament that takes place in Nagoya every July. Despite prefectural documents listing a seating capacity of 11,000 for sumo matches, the Japan Sumo Association announced in December 2024 that capacity for the 2025 Nagoya tournament would be limited to around 7,800 seats.

In February 2024 it was announced that British financial company IG Group would have naming rights for the Aichi International Arena for ten years. The rights deal was arranged by AEG Worldwide.

== Events ==
In April 2025, Japanese-American singer Ai became the first artist to perform at the arena, participating in an acoustic test. An opening ceremony was held on May 31, 2025 ahead of the July 2025 Grand Sumo Tournament, which was the arena's first official event. The arena's inaugural sumo tournament was won by Kotoshōhō.

The first boxing event was announced in July 2025 to take place on September 14, headlined by Japanese boxing star Naoya Inoue against Murodjon Akhmadaliev for the undisputed super bantamweight championship, which saw Inoue retain his titles by unanimous decision.

== See also ==
- List of indoor arenas in Japan
