= Judo at the Asian Games =

Judo competition

- Current event or competition: Judo at the 2026 Asian Games

Competition details
- Discipline: Judo
- Type: Quadrennial
- Organiser: Olympic Council of Asia (OCA)

History
- First edition: Seoul 1986
- Editions: 10
- Most recent: Hangzhou 2022
- Next edition: Aichi-Nagoya 2026

Judo is an event at the Asian Games since 1986 in Seoul, South Korea.

== Editions ==
Year	Date	Host city	Venue	Countries	Athletes	Best nation	competition	
Year	Date	Host city	Venue	Countries	Athletes	Best nation	♂	♀
1986	1–4 October	Seoul, South Korea	Saemaul Sports Hall			South Korea	●	—
1990	28 September – 1 October	Beijing, China	Yuetan Gymnasium			Japan	●	●
1994	12–15 October	Hiroshima, Japan	Hiroshima Sun Plaza	23	144	Japan	●	●
1998	7–10 December	Bangkok, Thailand	Thammasat Gymnasium 1	25	184	Japan	●	●
2002	30 September – 3 October	Busan, South Korea	Gudeok Gymnasium	30	174	Japan	●	●
2006	2–5 December	Doha, Qatar	Qatar SC Indoor Hall	34	138	China	●	●
2010	13–16 November	Guangzhou, China	Huagong Gymnasium	32	240	Japan	●	●
2014	20–23 September	Incheon, South Korea	Dowon Gymnasium	33	218	Japan	●	●
2018	29 August – 1 September	Jakarta–Palembang, Indonesia	Jakarta Convention Center	35	252	Japan	●	●
2022	24–27 September 2023	Hangzhou, China	Xiaoshan Linpu Gymnasium	33	227	Japan	●	●
2026	30 September – 3 October	Nagoya, Japan	Aichi International Arena	32	212	Japan	●	●

== Medal table ==
Updated after the 2022 Asian Games

Rank	Nation	Gold	Silver	Bronze	Total
1	Japan (JPN)	61	40	32	133
2	South Korea (KOR)	42	33	50	125
3	China (CHN)	21	17	39	77
4	Mongolia (MGL)	7	13	36	56
5	Uzbekistan (UZB)	5	8	25	38
6	North Korea (PRK)	4	8	16	28
7	Kazakhstan (KAZ)	2	12	27	41
8	Chinese Taipei (TPE)	2	4	21	27
9	Iran (IRI)	1	8	11	20
10	Tajikistan (TJK)	1	1	6	8
11	United Arab Emirates (UAE)	1	1	3	5
12	Kyrgyzstan (KGZ)	1	0	2	3
13	Turkmenistan (TKM)	0	2	3	5
14	Lebanon (LBN)	0	1	1	2
15	Philippines (PHI)	0	1	0	1
16	Thailand (THA)	0	0	9	9
17	India (IND)	0	0	5	5
18	Hong Kong (HKG)	0	0	3	3
19	Kuwait (KUW)	0	0	2	2
20	Indonesia (INA)	0	0	1	1
20	Myanmar (MYA)	0	0	1	1
Totals (21 entries)		148	149	293	590
