= Mayu Honda =

Japanese judoka (born 2004)

Personal information
- Native name: 本田 万結
- Born: 7 October 2004 (age 21) Japan
- Occupation: Judoka

Sport
- Country: Japan
- Sport: Judo
- Weight class: ‍–‍70 kg

Achievements and titles
- Asian Champ.: (gold) (2025)
Medal record
Women's judo
Representing Japan
World Championships
Gold medal – first place	2024 Abu Dhabi	Mixed team
Asian Championships
Gold medal – first place	2024 Hong Kong	Mixed team
Gold medal – first place	2025 Bangkok	‍–‍70 kg
IJF Grand Slam
Gold medal – first place	2024 Tokyo	‍–‍70 kg
Silver medal – second place	2025 Paris	‍–‍70 kg
World Juniors Championships
Gold medal – first place	2023 Odivelas	‍–‍70 kg
Gold medal – first place	2023 Odivelas	Mixed team
Summer Universiade
Gold medal – first place	2021 Chengdu	‍–‍70 kg
Gold medal – first place	2021 Chengdu	Women's team

Profile at external databases
- IJF: 68761
- JudoInside.com: 151243
- Updated on 29 April 2025

Mayu Honda (Japanese: 本田 万結, Hepburn: Honda Mayu; born 7 October 2004) is a Japanese judoka. She won a gold medal in the mixed team event at the 2024 World Judo Championships held in Abu Dhabi, United Arab Emirates.

== Judo career ==
=== Early career ===
Honda started judo at the age of seven at the Futami Judo Club. In her third year at Futami Junior High School, she lost in the third round of the 70 kg class at the National Junior High School Judo Championships. In her second year at Hieizan High School, she lost to Mitsui Sumitomo Insurance's Kuwagata Moeka by waza-ari in the final of the All Japan Junior Championships. She won the All Japan High School Championships open weight division with all ippon wins. In her third year, she competed against Fuji Gakuen High School in the final of the Kinshu Cup, losing to Yamamoto Kairan by ouchigare in the final match and coming in second. She won the individual competition at the Inter-High School Championships, but in the team final against Fuji Gakuen, she lost to Yamamoto by uchimata in the representative match and came in second again. She won the All Japan Junior Championships by defeating Kuwagata by kuzure-age shiho-gatame in the final. In 2023, Honda entered Tokai University, where she came in third in the championship tournament. At the 2021 World University Games, she won all her matches by ippon. She also won the team competition. She won the All Japan Junior Championships for the second consecutive year. At the 2023 World Junior Championships, Honda won all her matches by ippon, including defeating Kaillany Cardoso of Brazil with a combined technique in the final. In the team competition, she won all her matches by ippon, including defeating Melkia Auchecorne, who had won the 63 kg class at this tournament, with a yokoshiho-gatame technique in the final against France, contributing to her team's victory. At the Kodokan Cup, she placed third, losing to Saiganji Riho of Komatsu with a yokoshiho-gatame technique in the semifinals. At the Grand Slam Tokyo, she lost to Serafima Moscaru of Romania with a waza-ari technique in the second round. At the Grand Prix Odivelas, she lost by wazari to Kelly Petersen-Pollard of Great Britain in the third round. As a sophomore, she placed second in her weight class final after losing by disqualification to Shiho Tanaka of JR East.

=== Senior career ===
In the team competition at the Asian Championships, Honda contributed to her team's victory by winning by ippon in the final against Mongolia. At the mixed team event of the 2024 World Championships, she only participated in the semi-final against Uzbekistan, but won and the team went on to win the championship. She also won the championship tournament at the 2024 All Japan Student Judo Championships.
