= Kanta Nakano =

Japanese judoka (born 2000)

Personal information
- Born: 30 September 2000 (age 26)
- Occupation: Judoka

Sport
- Country: Japan
- Sport: Judo
- Weight class: +100 kg

Achievements and titles
- World Champ.: R16 (2026)
Medal record
Men's judo
Representing Japan
World Championships
| Gold medal – first place | 2024 Abu Dhabi | Mixed team |
| Gold medal – first place | 2026 Baku | Mixed team |
| Bronze medal – third place | 2025 Budapest | Mixed team |
IJF Grand Slam
| Gold medal – first place | 2024 Tokyo | +100 kg |
| Gold medal – first place | 2026 Paris | +100 kg |
| Bronze medal – third place | 2024 Paris | +100 kg |
| Bronze medal – third place | 2025 Baku | +100 kg |
| Bronze medal – third place | 2025 Tokyo | +100 kg |
| Bronze medal – third place | 2026 Lausanne | +100 kg |
IJF Grand Prix
| Gold medal – first place | 2024 Zagreb | +100 kg |
| Bronze medal – third place | 2024 Odivelas | +100 kg |
World University Games
| Silver medal – second place | 2019 Naples | +90 kg |
| Bronze medal – third place | 2019 Naples | Mixed team |

Profile at external databases
- IJF: 80141
- JudoInside.com: 118151
- Updated on 11 October 2026

Kanta Nakano (中野寛太, Nakano Kanta; born 30 September 2000) is a Japanese judoka.

== Career ==
In January 2024, Nakano competed at the 2024 Judo Grand Prix Odivelas and won a bronze medal in the +100 kg category, his first career IJF World Tour medal. The next month he competed at the 2024 Judo Grand Slam Paris and again won a bronze medal in the +100 kg category, his first career Judo Grand Slam medal. In April 2024, he won the All-Japan Judo Championships. The next month he competed at the 2024 World Judo Championships and won a gold medal in the mixed team event, Japan's seventh consecutive World Judo Championships gold medal in the event. In September 2024, he competed at the 2024 Judo Grand Prix Zagreb and earned his first career IJ World Tour victory. In December 2024, he competed at the 2024 Judo Grand Slam Tokyo and won his first career Judo Grand Slam gold medal in the +100 kg category. He defeated his teammate Hyōga Ōta in the final.

In February 2025, he competed at the 2025 Judo Grand Slam Baku and won a bronze medal in the +100 kg category. In April 2025, he was selected to represent Japan at the 2025 World Judo Championships. During the World Judo Championships he won a bronze medal in the mixed team event.

In February 2026, he competed at the 2026 Judo Grand Slam Paris and won a bronze medal in the +100 kg category. In April 2026, he was selected to represent Japan at the 2026 World Judo Championships. In October 2026, he competed at the 2026 World Judo Championships and helped Japan win a gold medal in the mixed team event. This was Japan's eighth gold medal in the event at the World Judo Championships and first since 2024.
