= 2024 World Judo Championships – Mixed team =

Judo competition

Judo Mixed team at the 2024 World Judo Championships
- Venue: Mubadala Arena
- Location: Abu Dhabi, United Arab Emirates
- Date: 24 May 2024
- Competitors: 146 from 13 nations
- Total prize money: €200,000

Medalists
gold medal	Mao Arai; Mayu Honda; Tatsuki Ishihara; Komei Kawabata; Kanta Nakano; Hyōga Ōta; Goki Tajima; Ayami Takano; Momo Tamaoki; Ryuga Tanaka; Shiho Tanaka; Wakaba Tomita	Japan
silver medal	Mathéo Akiana Mongo; Orlando Cazorla; Axel Clerget; Léa Fontaine; Joan-Benjamin Gaba; Priscilla Gneto; Coralie Hayme; Faïza Mokdar; Maxime-Gaël Ngayap Hambou; Margaux Pinot; Khamzat Saparbaev; Florine Soula	France
bronze medal	Eter Askilashvili; Luka Babutsidze; Giorgi Chikhelidze; Saba Inaneishvili; Giorgi Jabniashvili; Nino Loladze; Sophio Somkhishvili; Georgi Terashvili; Guram Tushishvili	Georgia
bronze medal	Thauany David Capanni Dias; Giovanni Esposito; Nicholas Mungai; Christian Parlati; Manuel Parlati; Irene Pedrotti; Gennaro Pirelli; Kim Polling; Lorenzo Rigano; Erica Simonetti; Asya Tavano	Italy

Champions
- Mixed team: Japan (7th title)

Competition at external databases
- Links: IJF • JudoInside

The mixed team event at the 2024 World Judo Championships was held at the Mubadala Arena in Abu Dhabi, United Arab Emirates on 24 May 2024.

== Participants ==
13 Nations will participate in the 2024 Mixed Team Judo Championships. The selected Judoka are:

Teams	Men			Women		
Teams	‍–‍73 kg	‍–‍90 kg	+90 kg	‍–‍57 kg	‍–‍70 kg	+70 kg
Austria	Samuel Gaßner	Bernd Fasching	Laurin Boehler; Movli Borchashvilli	Laura Kallinger	Magdalena Krssakova; Michaela Polleres	Maria Höllwart
Brazil	Michael Marcelino	Marcelo Gomes; Rafael Macedo	Rafael Buzacarini; Leonardo Gonçalves	Jéssica Lima	Luana Carvalho; Ellen Froner	Giovanna Santos
France	Orlando Cazorla; Joan-Benjamin Gaba	Axel Clerget; M-G Ngayap Hambou	Mathéo Akiana Mongo; Khamzat Saparbaev	Priscilla Gneto; Faïza Mokdar	Margaux Pinot; Florine Soula	Léa Fontaine; Coralie Hayme
Georgia	Giorgi Chikhelidze; Georgi Terashvili	Luka Babutsidze; Giorgi Jabniashvili	Saba Inaneishvili; Guram Tushishvili	Nino Loladze	Eter Askilashvili	Sophio Somkhishvili
Germany	Alexander Gabler; Jano Rübo	Johann Lenz; Eduard Trippel	Erik Abramov; Johannes Frey	Seija Ballhaus; Pauline Starke	Dena Pohl; Giovanna Scoccimarro	Samira Bouizgarne; Anna Monta Olek
Hungary	Bence Pongrácz	Péter Sáfrány; Krisztián Tóth	Richárd Sipőcz; Zsombor Vég	Réka Pupp	Szabina Gercsák	Jennifer Czerlau
Italy	Giovanni Esposito; Manuel Parlati	Christian Parlati; Lorenzo Rigano	Nicholas Mungai; Gennaro Pirelli	T-D Capanni Dias	Irene Pedrotti; Kim Polling	Erica Simonetti; Asya Tavano
Japan	Tatsuki Ishihara; Ryuga Tanaka	Komei Kawabata; Goki Tajima	Kanta Nakano; Hyōga Ōta	Ayami Takano; Momo Tamaoki	Mayu Honda; Shiho Tanaka	Mao Arai; Wakaba Tomita
Kazakhstan	Bakhitzhan Abdurakhmanov; Darkhan Koibagar	Aidar Arapov	Yerassyl Kazhibayev; Nurlykhan Sharkhan	Bakyt Kussakbayeva	Esmigul Kuyulova; Ekaterina Tokareva	Kamila Berlikash; Aruna Jangeldina
Mongolia	Batzayaagiin Erdenebayar; Lavjargalyn Ankhzayaa	Gantulgyn Altanbagana; Gereltuyaagiin Bolor-Ochir	Odkhüügiin Tsetsentsengel	Lkhagvatogoogiin Enkhriilen; Mönkhtsedeviin Ichinkhorloo	Batsuuriin Nyam-Erdene; Boldyn Gankhaich	Amarsaikhany Adiyaasüren; Otgonbayaryn Khüslen
Netherlands	Koen Heg	Mark van Dijk; Noël van 't End	Simeon Catharina; Jur Spijkers	Julie Beurskens; Naomi van Krevel	Hilde Jager; Margit de Voogd	Marit Kamps; Karen Stevenson
South Korea	An Ba-ul; Lee Eun-kyul	Gwak Dong-han; Han Ju-yeop	Kim Min-jong; Won Jong-hoon	Huh Mi-mi; Jung Ye-rin	Kim Ji-su	Kim Ha-yun; Lee Hyeon-ji
Uzbekistan	Shakhram Ahadov; Murodjon Yuldoshev	Davlat Bobonov; Sharofiddin Boltaboev	Muzaffarbek Turoboyev; Alisher Yusupov	Shukurjon Aminova; Diyora Keldiyorova	Gulnoza Matniyazova; Shokhista Nazarova	Rinata Ilmatova; Iriskhon Kurbanbaeva

== Results ==
=== Bracket ===
Round of 16
Germany	4
Kazakhstan	2
Brazil	2
Uzbekistan	4
South Korea	4
Austria	1
Netherlands	3
Italy	4
Hungary	4
Mongolia	1

Quarter-finals
Japan	4
Germany	0
Uzbekistan	4
South Korea	0
France	4
Italy	1
Georgia	4
Hungary	1

Semi-finals
Japan	4
Uzbekistan	1
France	4
Georgia	2

Final
Japan	4
France	1

=== Repechage ===
Repechage
Germany	1
~~South Korea~~	4
Italy	4
Hungary	0

Third place
Germany (Note: South Korea was retroactively disqualified following Won Jong-hoon's refusal to compete at +90 kg in the Quarter-finals while Uzbekistan was leading 2–0.)	1
Georgia	4
Italy	4
Uzbekistan	2

== Matches ==
=== Round of 16 ===
==== Germany vs Kazakhstan ====
Weight Class	Germany	Result	Kazakhstan	Score
Women –70 kg	Giovanna Scoccimarro	01 – 00	Ekaterina Tokareva	1 – 0
Men –90 kg	Eduard Trippel	01 (yellow card) – 00 (yellow card)	Aidar Arapov	2 – 0
Women +70 kg	Anna Monta Olek	00 – 11 (yellow card)	Kamila Berlikash	2 – 1
Men +90 kg	Johannes Frey	00 – 10	Yerassyl Kazhibayev	2 – 2
Women –57 kg	Pauline Starke	10 – 00 (yellow card)	Bakyt Kussakbayeva	3 – 2
Men –73 kg	Jano Rübo	10 – 00	Darkhan Koibagar	4 – 2

==== Brazil vs Uzbekistan ====
Weight Class	Brazil	Result	Uzbekistan	Score
Women –70 kg	Ellen Froner	10 – 00	Gulnoza Matniyazova	1 – 0
Men –90 kg	Marcelo Gomes	00 – 01	Sharofiddin Boltaboev	1 – 1
Women +70 kg	Giovanna Santos	02 – 00	Iriskhon Kurbanbaeva	2 – 1
Men +90 kg	Rafael Buzacarini	01 (yellow card) – 02	Alisher Yusupov	2 – 2
Women –57 kg	Jéssica Lima	00 – 11 (yellow card)	Diyora Keldiyorova	2 – 3
Men –73 kg	Michael Marcelino	00 (yellow card) – 02 (yellow card)	Murodjon Yuldoshev	2 – 4

==== Republic of Korea vs Austria ====
Weight Class	South Korea	Result	Austria	Score
Women –70 kg	Kim Ji-su	02 (yellow card) – 00 (yellow card)	Magdalena Krssakova	1 – 0
Men –90 kg	Han Ju-yeop	00 (yellow card) – 10 (yellow card)	Bernd Fasching	1 – 1
Women +70 kg	Lee Hyeon-ji	10 – 00	Maria Höllwart	2 – 1
Men +90 kg	Kim Min-jong	10 (yellow card) – 00 (yellow card)	Movli Borchashvilli	3 – 1
Women –57 kg	Huh Mi-mi	02 – 00 (yellow card)	Laura Kallinger	4 – 1
Men –73 kg	Lee Eun-kyul	—	Samuel Gaßner	—

==== Netherlands vs Italy ====
Weight Class	Netherlands	Result	Italy	Score
Women –70 kg	Hilde Jager	00 (yellow card) – 01 (yellow card)	Kim Polling	0 – 1
Men –90 kg	Mark van Dijk	02 (yellow card) – 00 (yellow card)	Lorenzo Rigano	1 – 1
Women +70 kg	Marit Kamps	01 – 00	Asya Tavano	2 – 1
Men +90 kg	Jur Spijkers	01 (yellow card) – 00 (yellow card)	Nicholas Mungai	3 – 1
Women –57 kg	Julie Beurskens	00 – 02	Thauany David Capanni Dias	3 – 2
Men –73 kg	Koen Heg	00 – 01	Giovanni Esposito	3 – 3
Women –70 kg	Hilde Jager	00 (yellow card) – 01	Kim Polling	3 – 4

==== Hungary vs Mongolia ====
Weight Class	Hungary	Result	Mongolia	Score
Women –70 kg	Szabina Gercsák	10 (yellow card) – 00	Boldyn Gankhaich	1 – 0
Men –90 kg	Péter Sáfrány	10 – 00	Gereltuyaagiin Bolor-Ochir	2 – 0
Women +70 kg	Jennifer Czerlau	00 – 10 (yellow card)	Amarsaikhany Adiyaasüren	2 – 1
Men +90 kg	Krisztián Tóth	10 – 00	Odkhüügiin Tsetsentsengel	3 – 1
Women –57 kg	Réka Pupp	11 (yellow card) – 00	Mönkhtsedeviin Ichinkhorloo	4 – 1
Men –73 kg	Bence Pongrácz	—	Lavjargalyn Ankhzayaa	—

=== Quarter-finals ===
==== Japan vs Germany ====
Weight Class	Japan	Result	Germany	Score
Men –90 kg	Komei Kawabata	10 – 00	Johann Lenz	1 – 0
Women +70 kg	Mao Arai	10 – 00	Samira Bouizgarne	2 – 0
Men +90 kg	Kanta Nakano	10 – 00	Erik Abramov	3 – 0
Women –57 kg	Ayami Takano	01 – 00 (yellow card)	Pauline Starke	4 – 0
Men –73 kg	Ryuga Tanaka	—	Jano Rübo	—
Women –70 kg	Shiho Tanaka	—	Giovanna Scoccimarro	—

==== Uzbekistan vs Republic of Korea ====
Weight Class	Uzbekistan	Result	South Korea	Score
Men –90 kg	Sharofiddin Boltaboev	10 (yellow card) – 00	Han Ju-yeop	1 – 0
Women +70 kg	Rinata Ilmatova	10 – 00	Lee Hyeon-ji	2 – 0
Men +90 kg	Muzaffarbek Turoboyev	w/o –	Won Jong-hoon	3 – 0
Women –57 kg	Diyora Keldiyorova	10 – 00	Jung Ye-rin	4 – 0
Men –73 kg	Murodjon Yuldoshev	—	Lee Eun-kyul	—
Women –70 kg	Shokhista Nazarova	—	Kim Ji-su	—

==== France vs Italy ====
Weight Class	France	Result	Italy	Score
Men –90 kg	Maxime-Gaël Ngayap Hambou	11 (yellow card) – 01	Lorenzo Rigano	1 – 0
Women +70 kg	Léa Fontaine	10 (yellow card) – 00	Erica Simonetti	2 – 0
Men +90 kg	Axel Clerget	10 (yellow card) – 00	Nicholas Mungai	3 – 0
Women –57 kg	Priscilla Gneto	00 – 10	Thauany David Capanni Dias	3 – 1
Men –73 kg	Joan-Benjamin Gaba	10 (yellow card) – 00	Giovanni Esposito	4 – 1
Women –70 kg	Margaux Pinot	—	Irene Pedrotti	—

==== Georgia vs Hungary ====
Weight Class	Georgia	Result	Hungary	Score
Men –90 kg	Luka Babutsidze	10 – 00 (yellow card)	Péter Sáfrány	1 – 0
Women +70 kg	Sophio Somkhishvili	00 – 02 (yellow card)	Jennifer Czerlau	1 – 1
Men +90 kg	Guram Tushishvili	10 – 00 (yellow card)	Krisztián Tóth	2 – 1
Women –57 kg	Nino Loladze	11 (yellow card) – 00	Réka Pupp	3 – 1
Men –73 kg	Giorgi Chikhelidze	02 – 00	Bence Pongrácz	4 – 1
Women –70 kg	Eter Askilashvili	—	Szabina Gercsák	—

=== Repechages ===
==== Germany vs Republic of Korea ====
Weight Class	Germany	Result	South Korea	Score
Women +70 kg	Samira Bouizgarne	00 – 10	Kim Ha-yun	0 – 1
Men +90 kg	Erik Abramov	00 – 10	Kim Min-jong	0 – 2
Women –57 kg	Seija Ballhaus	10 – 00	Jung Ye-rin	1 – 2
Men –73 kg	Jano Rübo	01 – 02 (yellow card)	Lee Eun-kyul	1 – 3
Women –70 kg	Giovanna Scoccimarro	00 – 10	Kim Ji-su	1 – 4
Men –90 kg	Eduard Trippel	—	Han Ju-yeop	—

==== Italy vs Hungary ====
Weight Class	Italy	Result	Hungary	Score
Women +70 kg	Erica Simonetti	01 (yellow card) – 00 (yellow card)	Jennifer Czerlau	1 – 0
Men +90 kg	Gennaro Pirelli	10 – 00	Krisztián Tóth	2 – 0
Women –57 kg	Thauany David Capanni Dias	10 – 00	Réka Pupp	3 – 0
Men –73 kg	Manuel Parlati	02 – 00 (yellow card)	Bence Pongrácz	4 – 0
Women –70 kg	Irene Pedrotti	—	Szabina Gercsák	—
Men –90 kg	Lorenzo Rigano	—	Péter Sáfrány	—

=== Semi-finals ===
==== Japan vs Uzbekistan ====
Weight Class	Japan	Result	Uzbekistan	Score
Women +70 kg	Mao Arai	01 – 00 (yellow card)	Rinata Ilmatova	1 – 0
Men +90 kg	Kanta Nakano	00 (yellow card) – 10	Muzaffarbek Turoboyev	1 – 1
Women –57 kg	Momo Tamaoki	10 (yellow card) – 00	Shukurjon Aminova	2 – 1
Men –73 kg	Ryuga Tanaka	02 (yellow card) – 00 (yellow card)	Murodjon Yuldoshev	3 – 1
Women –70 kg	Mayu Honda	10 (yellow card) – 00	Shokhista Nazarova	4 – 1
Men –90 kg	Komei Kawabata	—	Sharofiddin Boltaboev	—

==== France vs Georgia ====
Weight Class	France	Result	Georgia	Score
Women +70 kg	Coralie Hayme	02 – 00	Sophio Somkhishvili	1 – 0
Men +90 kg	Mathéo Akiana Mongo	00 – 11 (yellow card)	Guram Tushishvili	1 – 1
Women –57 kg	Faïza Mokdar	10 – 00 (yellow card)	Nino Loladze	2 – 1
Men –73 kg	Joan-Benjamin Gaba	00 – 10	Giorgi Chikhelidze	2 – 2
Women –70 kg	Margaux Pinot	11 – 00	Eter Askilashvili	3 – 2
Men –90 kg	Axel Clerget	10 (yellow card) – 00	Luka Babutsidze	4 – 2

=== Bronze medal matches ===
==== Germany vs Georgia ====
Weight Class	Germany	Result	Georgia	Score
Men +90 kg	Johannes Frey	00 – 10	Guram Tushishvili	0 – 1
Women –57 kg	Pauline Starke	01 – 11 (yellow card)	Nino Loladze	0 – 2
Men –73 kg	Jano Rübo	00 – 02	Giorgi Chikhelidze	0 – 3
Women –70 kg	Giovanna Scoccimarro	01 – 00 (yellow card)	Eter Askilashvili	1 – 3
Men –90 kg	Johann Lenz	00 – 10	Luka Babutsidze	1 – 4
Women +70 kg	Anna Monta Olek	—	Sophio Somkhishvili	—

==== Italy vs Uzbekistan ====
Weight Class	Italy	Result	Uzbekistan	Score
Men +90 kg	Nicholas Mungai	00 – 10	Alisher Yusupov	0 – 1
Women –57 kg	Thauany David Capanni Dias	02 – 00	Diyora Keldiyorova	1 – 1
Men –73 kg	Giovanni Esposito	01 – 00	Shakhram Ahadov	2 – 1
Women –70 kg	Irene Pedrotti	10 – 00	Gulnoza Matniyazova	3 – 1
Men –90 kg	Lorenzo Rigano	00 – 10 (yellow card)	Sharofiddin Boltaboev	3 – 2
Women +70 kg	Asya Tavano	11 – 00	Rinata Ilmatova	4 – 2

=== Gold medal match - Japan vs France ===
Weight Class	Japan	Result	France	Score
Men +90 kg	Kanta Nakano	02 – 00 (yellow card)	Mathéo Akiana Mongo	1 – 0
Women –57 kg	Momo Tamaoki	01 – 00	Faïza Mokdar	2 – 0
Men –73 kg	Ryuga Tanaka	10 – 00	Joan-Benjamin Gaba	3 – 0
Women –70 kg	Shiho Tanaka	00 – 10	Margaux Pinot	3 – 1
Men –90 kg	Komei Kawabata	02 – 00	Axel Clerget	4 – 1
Women +70 kg	Mao Arai	—	Coralie Hayme	—

== Prize money ==
The sums listed bring the total prizes awarded to €200,000 for the event.

Medal	Total	Judoka	Coach
Gold	€90,000	€72,000	€18,000
Silver	€60,000	€48,000	€12,000
Bronze	€25,000	€20,000	€5,000
