= Ayami Takano =

Japanese judoka (born 1997)

Personal information
- Native name: 髙野 綺海
- Born: 18 June 1997 (age 29) Chikushino, Fukuoka, Japan
- Occupation: Judoka

Sport
- Country: Japan
- Sport: Judo
- Weight class: ‍–‍57 kg
Medal record
Women's judo
Representing Japan
World Championships
Gold medal – first place	2024 Abu Dhabi	Mixed team
IJF Grand Slam
Silver medal – second place	2025 Baku	‍–‍57 kg
Bronze medal – third place	2026 Lausanne	‍–‍57 kg
IJF Grand Prix
Gold medal – first place	2026 Linz	‍–‍57 kg
Bronze medal – third place	2024 Odivelas	‍–‍57 kg

Profile at external databases
- IJF: 75213
- JudoInside.com: 157287
- Updated on 1 September 2026

Ayami Takano (Japanese: 髙野 綺海, Hepburn: Takano Ayami; born 18 June 1997) is a Japanese judoka. She won a gold medal in the mixed team event at the 2024 World Judo Championships held in Abu Dhabi, United Arab Emirates. Her specialty is the ouchi-gari. She is currently studying for a doctorate at Tokyo Gakugei University Graduate School.

== Judo career ==
Takano started judo at the age of three at the Chikushi dojo where her grandfather taught her. In her third year at Kiyama Junior High School, she lost in the third round of the 52kg class at the National Junior High School Judo Championships. She went on to Miyazaki Nihon University High School, where she lost in the third round of the 57kg class at the Inter-High School Championships in her third year. She went on to Tokyo Gakugei University in 2016 and placed fifth in her student weight class in her third year. In the Kodokan Cup, Takano won her first match by defeating London Olympic gold medalist Kaori Matsumoto of Beneseed with a combined technique, but lost in the next match. In 2020, she joined Japan Ace Support. In the 2022 Kodokan Cup, she lost to Tokyo Olympic bronze medalist Tsukasa Yoshida of Komatsu by disqualification in the semi-finals, but still placed third. In the 2023 weight class, she won her first match by disqualification against Momo Tamaki of Mitsui Sumitomo Insurance, then won the final by disqualification against Yoshida, winning her first senior national championship.

At the 2023 Judo Grand Prix Linz, Takano lost her first match to Hasret Bozkurt of Turkey by a seoi-nage throw early in the match. In the Kodokan Cup, she lost to Hiyori Koga of Park 24 by waza-ari in the final, placing second. At the Grand Slam Tokyo, she lost by waza-ari to Canada's Christa Deguchi in the quarterfinals, and then lost by disqualification to Israel's Timna Nelson-Levy in the repechage, finishing in seventh place. At the 2024 Judo Grand Prix Odivelas, Takano lost by waza-ari to Huh Mi-mi in the semifinals, but beat Nelson-Levy by waza-ari in the third-place deciding match to finish third. In the weight class in April, she placed second in the final, losing by waza-ari to Tamaki. At the mixed team event of the World Judo Championships, she only competed in her first match against Germany, but won, and then her team went on to win the championship.
