= 2026 Judo Grand Slam Tokyo =

Judo competition

Judo 2026 Judo Grand Slam Tokyo
- Venue: Tokyo Metropolitan Gymnasium
- Location: Tokyo, Japan
- Dates: 5–6 December 2026
- Total prize money: €154,000

Competition at external databases
- Links: IJF • JudoInside

The 2026 Judo Grand Slam Tokyo is an edition of the Tokyo Grand Slam tournament that will be held at the Tokyo Metropolitan Gymnasium in Tokyo, Japan from 5 to 6 December 2026 as part of the IJF World Tour and during the 2028 Summer Olympics qualification period.

== Medal summary ==
=== Men's events ===
Event	Gold	Silver	Bronze
Extra-lightweight (−60 kg)			
Half-lightweight (−66 kg)			
Lightweight (−73 kg)			
Half-middleweight (−81 kg)			
Middleweight (−90 kg)			
Half-heavyweight (−100 kg)			
Heavyweight (+100 kg)			

=== Women's events ===
Event	Gold	Silver	Bronze
Extra-lightweight (−48 kg)			
Half-lightweight (−52 kg)			
Lightweight (−57 kg)			
Half-middleweight (−63 kg)			
Middleweight (−70 kg)			
Half-heavyweight (−78 kg)			
Heavyweight (+78 kg)			

=== Medal table ===
* Host nation (Japan)

Rank	Nation	Gold	Silver	Bronze	Total
Totals (0 entries)		0	0	0	0

== Prize money ==
The sums written are per medalist, bringing the total prizes awarded to €154,000. (retrieved from:)

Medal	Total	Judoka	Coach
Gold	€5,000	€4,000	€1,000
Silver	€3,000	€2,400	€600
Bronze	€1,500	€1,200	€300
