= 2025 World Judo Championships – Mixed team =

Judo competition

Judo Mixed team at the 2025 World Judo Championships
- Venue: László Papp Budapest Sports Arena
- Location: Budapest, Hungary
- Date: 20 June 2025
- Competitors: 172 from 16 nations
- Total prize money: €200,000

Medalists
gold medal	Eter Askilashvili; Mikheili Bakhbakhashvili; Lasha Bekauri; Saba Inaneishvili; Eteri Liparteliani; Nino Loladze; Luka Maisuradze; Sophio Somkhishvili; Mariam Tchanturia; Guram Tushishvili	Georgia
silver medal	Bae Dong-hyun; Huh Mi-mi; Kim Chann-yeong; Kim Ha-yun; Kim Jong-hoon; Kim Ju-hee; Kim Min-jong; Lee Hyeon-ji; Lee Joon-hwan; Lee Seung-yeob; Lee Ye-rang; Shin Chae-won	South Korea
bronze medal	Erik Abramov; Mascha Ballhaus; Seija Ballhaus; Alina Böhm; Samira Bouizgarne; Miriam Butkereit; Timo Cavelius; Losseni Kone; Jano Rübo; Giovanna Scoccimarro; Eduard Trippel; Igor Wandtke	Germany
bronze medal	Mao Arai; Megumi Fuchida; Tatsuki Ishihara; Sanshiro Murao; Kanta Nakano; Hyōga Ōta; Goki Tajima; Ruri Takahashi; Momo Tamaoki; Shiho Tanaka; Yudai Tanaka; Utana Terada	Japan

Champions
- Mixed team: Georgia (1st title)

Competition at external databases
- Links: IJF • JudoInside

The mixed team event at the 2025 World Judo Championships was held at the László Papp Budapest Sports Arena in Budapest, Hungary on 20 June 2025.

== Participants ==
15 Nations and 1 IJF Team will participate in the 2025 Mixed Team Judo Championships. The selected Judoka are:

Teams	Men			Women		
Teams	‍–‍73 kg	‍–‍90 kg	+90 kg	‍–‍57 kg	‍–‍70 kg	+70 kg
Austria	Samuel Gaßner	Bernd Fasching; Thomas Scharfetter	Movli Borchashvilli	Verena Hiden	Elena Dengg	none
Azerbaijan	Hidayat Heydarov; Rashid Mammadaliyev	Eljan Hajiyev; Vugar Talibov	Ushangi Kokauri; Zelym Kotsoiev	Fidan Alizada; Gultaj Mammadaliyeva	Aytaj Gardashkhanli	Nigar Suleymanova
Brazil	Vinicius Ardina; Daniel Cargnin	Marcelo Gomes; Rafael Macedo	Rafael Buzacarini; Leonardo Gonçalves	Jéssica Lima; Shirlen Nascimento	Nauana Silva; Rafaela Silva	Karol Gimenes; Beatriz Souza
China	Li Jinhang; Xue Ziyang	Han Qi; Wang Jiangnan	Huang Fuchun; Li Ruixuan	Tao Yuying; Zhang Yuanli	Tang Jing; Yu Dan	Ayiman Jinesinuer; Niu Xinran
France	Orlando Cazorla; Joan-Benjamin Gaba	Alexis Mathieu; M-G Ngayap Hambou	Tieman Diaby; Angel Gustan	Sarah-Léonie Cysique; Faïza Mokdar	Melkia Auchecorne; Marie-Ève Gahié	Romane Dicko; Julia Tolofua
Georgia	Mikheili Bakhbakhashvili	Lasha Bekauri; Luka Maisuradze	Saba Inaneishvili; Guram Tushishvili	Eteri Liparteliani; Nino Loladze	Eter Askilashvili; Mariam Tchanturia	Sophio Somkhishvili
Germany	Jano Rübo; Igor Wandtke	Timo Cavelius; Eduard Trippel	Erik Abramov; Losseni Kone	Mascha Ballhaus; Seija Ballhaus	Miriam Butkereit; Giovanna Scoccimarro	Alina Böhm; Samira Bouizgarne
Hungary	Áron Szabó; Dániel Szegedi	Gergely Nerpel; Péter Sáfrány	János Balogh; Zsombor Vég	Kitti Kovács; Réka Pupp	Jennifer Czerlau; Szofi Özbas	Nikolett Sági
IJF Team	Armen Agaian; Karen Galstian	Mansur Lorsanov; Egor Malkin	Denis Batchaev; Valeriy Endovitskiy	Kseniia Galitskaia; Irina Zueva	Tamara Lishchenko; Madina Taimazova	Mariia Ivanova; Elis Startseva
Italy	Giovanni Esposito; Manuel Lombardo	Kenny Komi Bedel; Christian Parlati	Kwadjo Anani; Gennaro Pirelli	Giulia Carnà; Odette Giuffrida	Irene Pedrotti; Giorgia Stangherlin	Alice Bellandi; Asya Tavano
Japan	Tatsuki Ishihara; Yudai Tanaka	Sanshiro Murao; Goki Tajima	Kanta Nakano; Hyōga Ōta	Megumi Fuchida; Momo Tamaoki	Shiho Tanaka; Utana Terada	Mao Arai; Ruri Takahashi
Kazakhstan	Darkhan Koibagar; Yeset Kuanov	Yermakhan Anuarbekov	Yerassyl Kazhibayev; Yelaman Yergaliyev	Dana Abdirova	Esmigul Kuyulova; Korkem Orymbek	Akerke Ramazanova
Mongolia	Lavjargalyn Ankhzayaa; Odgereliin Uranbayar	Oyunchimegiin Shinebayar; Tserenbatyn Gan-Erdene	Batkhuyagiin Gonchigsüren; Bayartsengeliin Khüderchuluun	Lkhagvasürengiin Sosorbaram; Terbishiin Ariunzayaa	Batsuuriin Nyam-Erdene; Darkhanbatbayaryn Yesüi	Amarsaikhany Adiyaasüren; Dambadarjaagiin Nominzul
South Korea	Bae Dong-hyun; Kim Chann-yeong	Kim Jong-hoon; Lee Joon-hwan	Kim Min-jong; Lee Seung-yeob	Huh Mi-mi; Kim Ju-hee	Lee Ye-rang; Shin Chae-won	Kim Ha-yun; Lee Hyeon-ji
Turkmenistan	Hekim Agamämmedow; Toyly Myradow	Mamedaly Açyldyyew	Baýmyrat Majanow	Kurbanay Kurbanova	Maysa Pardayeva	none
Uzbekistan	Shakhram Ahadov; Obidkhon Nomonov	Nurbek Murtozoev; Arslonbek Tojiev	Muzaffarbek Turoboyev; Alisher Yusupov	Mukhayyo Akhmatova; Shukurjon Aminova	Khurshida Razzokberdieva; Shirinjon Yuldoshova	Iriskhon Kurbanbaeva; Umida Nigmatova

== Results ==
=== Bracket ===
Round of 16
Japan	4
Austria	0
Uzbekistan	4
Turkmenistan	0
Italy	4
Hungary	1
Georgia	4
China	1
France	4
IJF	3
South Korea	4
Mongolia	0
Brazil	4
Kazakhstan	0
Germany	4
Azerbaijan	1

Quarter-finals
Japan	4
Uzbekistan	2
Italy	0
Georgia	4
France	3
South Korea	4
Brazil	3
Germany	4

Semi-finals
Japan	2
Georgia	4
South Korea	4
Germany	0

Final
Georgia	4
South Korea	1

=== Repechage ===
Repechage
Uzbekistan	3
Italy	4
France	1
Brazil	4

Third place
Italy	1
Germany	4
Brazil	0
Japan	4

== Matches ==
=== Round of 16 ===
==== Japan vs Austria ====
Weight Class	Japan	Result	Austria	Score
Women –70 kg	Utana Terada	100 – 000	Elena Dengg	1 – 0
Men –90 kg	Goki Tajima	101 – 000 (yellow card)	Bernd Fasching	2 – 0
Women +70 kg	Mao Arai	w/o –	-none Women +70 kg-	3 – 0
Men +90 kg	Kanta Nakano	102 – 000	Movli Borchashvilli	4 – 0
Women –57 kg	Megumi Fuchida	—	Verena Hiden	—
Men –73 kg	Yudai Tanaka	—	Samuel Gaßner	—

==== Uzbekistan vs Turkmenistan ====
Weight Class	Uzbekistan	Result	Turkmenistan	Score
Women –70 kg	Khurshida Razzokberdieva	001 (yellow card) – 000	Maysa Pardayeva	1 – 0
Men –90 kg	Nurbek Murtozoev	100 – 000 (yellow card)	Mamedaly Açyldyyew	2 – 0
Women +70 kg	Umida Nigmatova	w/o –	-none Women +70 kg-	3 – 0
Men +90 kg	Muzaffarbek Turoboyev	100 – 000 (yellow card)	Baýmyrat Majanow	4 – 0
Women –57 kg	Shukurjon Aminova	—	Kurbanay Kurbanova	—
Men –73 kg	Obidkhon Nomonov	—	Hekim Agamämmedow	—

==== Italy vs Hungary ====
Weight Class	Italy	Result	Hungary	Score
Women –70 kg	Giorgia Stangherlin	000 – 101	Szofi Özbas	0 – 1
Men –90 kg	Kenny Komi Bedel	001 – 000	Gergely Nerpel	1 – 1
Women +70 kg	Alice Bellandi	100 – 000	Jennifer Czerlau	2 – 1
Men +90 kg	Gennaro Pirelli	001 (yellow card) – 000	Zsombor Vég	3 – 1
Women –57 kg	Odette Giuffrida	100 – 000	Réka Pupp	4 – 1
Men –73 kg	Giovanni Esposito	—	Dániel Szegedi	—

==== Georgia vs People's Republic of China ====
Weight Class	Georgia	Result	China	Score
Women –70 kg	Mariam Tchanturia	100 (yellow card) – 000	Yu Dan	1 – 0
Men –90 kg	Lasha Bekauri	100 – 000	Han Qi	2 – 0
Women +70 kg	Sophio Somkhishvili	000 (yellow card) – 100 (yellow card)	Niu Xinran	2 – 1
Men +90 kg	Guram Tushishvili	100 – 000	Li Ruixuan	3 – 1
Women –57 kg	Eteri Liparteliani	002 (yellow card) – 000	Tao Yuying	4 – 1
Men –73 kg	Mikheili Bakhbakhashvili	—	Li Jinhang	—

==== France vs International Judo Federation Team ====
Weight Class	France	Result	IJF	Score
Women –70 kg	Marie-Ève Gahié	100 – 000	Madina Taimazova	1 – 0
Men –90 kg	Maxime-Gaël Ngayap Hambou	000 – 001	Egor Malkin	1 – 1
Women +70 kg	Romane Dicko	000 – 020	Elis Startseva	1 – 2
Men +90 kg	Tieman Diaby	000 – 010	Valeriy Endovitskiy	1 – 3
Women –57 kg	Sarah-Léonie Cysique	010 – 000 (yellow card)	Irina Zueva	2 – 3
Men –73 kg	Joan-Benjamin Gaba	110 – 000	Karen Galstian	3 – 3
Men –90 kg	Maxime-Gaël Ngayap Hambou	010 – 000	Egor Malkin	4 – 3

==== Republic of Korea vs Mongolia ====
Weight Class	South Korea	Result	Mongolia	Score
Women –70 kg	Lee Ye-rang	100 – 000 (yellow card)	Batsuuriin Nyam-Erdene	1 – 0
Men –90 kg	Kim Jong-hoon	002 – 001 (yellow card)	Tserenbatyn Gan-Erdene	2 – 0
Women +70 kg	Lee Hyeon-ji	100 – 000	Dambadarjaagiin Nominzul	3 – 0
Men +90 kg	Kim Min-jong	100 – 000	Batkhuyagiin Gonchigsüren	4 – 0
Women –57 kg	Huh Mi-mi	—	Terbishiin Ariunzayaa	—
Men –73 kg	Bae Dong-hyun	—	Lavjargalyn Ankhzayaa	—

==== Brazil vs Kazakhstan ====
Weight Class	Brazil	Result	Kazakhstan	Score
Women –70 kg	Nauana Silva	022 – 000 (yellow card)	Korkem Orymbek	1 – 0
Men –90 kg	Rafael Macedo	100 – 000 (yellow card)	Yermakhan Anuarbekov	2 – 0
Women +70 kg	Beatriz Souza	101 – 000	Akerke Ramazanova	3 – 0
Men +90 kg	Rafael Buzacarini	100 – 010	Yelaman Yergaliyev	4 – 0
Women –57 kg	Jéssica Lima	—	Dana Abdirova	—
Men –73 kg	Vinicius Ardina	—	Darkhan Koibagar	—

==== Germany vs Azerbaijan ====
Weight Class	Germany	Result	Azerbaijan	Score
Women –70 kg	Giovanna Scoccimarro	100 – 000 (yellow card)	Aytaj Gardashkhanli	1 – 0
Men –90 kg	Eduard Trippel	100 – 001	Eljan Hajiyev	2 – 0
Women +70 kg	Samira Bouizgarne	100 – 000	Nigar Suleymanova	3 – 0
Men +90 kg	Erik Abramov	000 (yellow card) – 011 (yellow card)	Zelym Kotsoiev	3 – 1
Women –57 kg	Seija Ballhaus	010 – 000	Fidan Alizada	4 – 1
Men –73 kg	Igor Wandtke	—	Hidayat Heydarov	—

=== Quarter-finals ===
==== Japan vs Uzbekistan ====
Weight Class	Japan	Result	Uzbekistan	Score
Men –90 kg	Goki Tajima	000 – 100	Nurbek Murtozoev	0 – 1
Women +70 kg	Mao Arai	000 – 021	Umida Nigmatova	0 – 2
Men +90 kg	Kanta Nakano	001 (yellow card) – 000	Muzaffarbek Turoboyev	1 – 2
Women –57 kg	Megumi Fuchida	100 – 000 H	Shukurjon Aminova	2 – 2
Men –73 kg	Yudai Tanaka	010 – 000	Obidkhon Nomonov	3 – 2
Women –70 kg	Utana Terada	100 (yellow card) – 000 (yellow card)	Khurshida Razzokberdieva	4 – 2

==== Italy vs Georgia ====
Weight Class	Italy	Result	Georgia	Score
Men –90 kg	Christian Parlati	000 – 010	Lasha Bekauri	0 – 1
Women +70 kg	Asya Tavano	000 – 110	Sophio Somkhishvili	0 – 2
Men +90 kg	Gennaro Pirelli	000 (yellow card) – 101 (yellow card)	Guram Tushishvili	0 – 3
Women –57 kg	Giulia Carnà	000 – 101	Eteri Liparteliani	0 – 4
Men –73 kg	Manuel Lombardo	—	Mikheili Bakhbakhashvili	—
Women –70 kg	Irene Pedrotti	—	Mariam Tchanturia	—

==== France vs Republic of Korea ====
Weight Class	France	Result	South Korea	Score
Men –90 kg	Maxime-Gaël Ngayap Hambou	001 – 010	Kim Jong-hoon	0 – 1
Women +70 kg	Julia Tolofua	100 – 000	Lee Hyeon-ji	1 – 1
Men +90 kg	Angel Gustan	000 (yellow card) – 101	Lee Seung-yeob	1 – 2
Women –57 kg	Faïza Mokdar	000 – 001	Huh Mi-mi	1 – 3
Men –73 kg	Joan-Benjamin Gaba	100 – 000	Bae Dong-hyun	2 – 3
Women –70 kg	Marie-Ève Gahié	100 (yellow card) – 000	Lee Ye-rang	3 – 3
Men +90 kg	Angel Gustan	– w/o	Lee Seung-yeob	3 – 4

==== Brazil vs Germany ====
Weight Class	Brazil	Result	Germany	Score
Men –90 kg	Rafael Macedo	000 (yellow card) – 010	Eduard Trippel	0 – 1
Women +70 kg	Beatriz Souza	001 (yellow card) – 000	Samira Bouizgarne	1 – 1
Men +90 kg	Rafael Buzacarini	000 – 010 (yellow card)	Losseni Kone	1 – 2
Women –57 kg	Shirlen Nascimento	011 – 000	Mascha Ballhaus	2 – 2
Men –73 kg	Vinicius Ardina	111 (yellow card) – 000 (yellow card)	Igor Wandtke	3 – 2
Women –70 kg	Rafaela Silva	001 – 100	Miriam Butkereit	3 – 3
Women –70 kg	Rafaela Silva	000 – 011	Miriam Butkereit	3 – 4

=== Repechages ===
==== Uzbekistan vs Italy ====
Weight Class	Uzbekistan	Result	Italy	Score
Women +70 kg	Umida Nigmatova	002 (yellow card) – 100	Asya Tavano	0 – 1
Men +90 kg	Alisher Yusupov	100 – 000	Kwadjo Anani	1 – 1
Women –57 kg	Mukhayyo Akhmatova	000 – 001 (yellow card)	Odette Giuffrida	1 – 2
Men –73 kg	Shakhram Ahadov	100 – 000	Manuel Lombardo	2 – 2
Women –70 kg	Khurshida Razzokberdieva	000 – 021	Irene Pedrotti	2 – 3
Men –90 kg	Nurbek Murtozoev	010 – 000	Kenny Komi Bedel	3 – 3
Women –70 kg	Khurshida Razzokberdieva	000 – 100	Irene Pedrotti	3 – 4

==== France vs Brazil ====
Weight Class	France	Result	Brazil	Score
Women +70 kg	Julia Tolofua	000 (yellow card) – 100 (yellow card)	Beatriz Souza	0 – 1
Men +90 kg	Tieman Diaby	000 – 101	Leonardo Gonçalves	0 – 2
Women –57 kg	Faïza Mokdar	000 – 100	Shirlen Nascimento	0 – 3
Men –73 kg	Joan-Benjamin Gaba	100 – 000	Vinicius Ardina	1 – 3
Women –70 kg	Marie-Ève Gahié	000 – 100	Rafaela Silva	1 – 4
Men –90 kg	Alexis Mathieu	—	Marcelo Gomes	—

=== Semi-finals ===
==== Japan vs Georgia ====
Weight Class	Japan	Result	Georgia	Score
Women +70 kg	Ruri Takahashi	100 – 000	Sophio Somkhishvili	1 – 0
Men +90 kg	Kanta Nakano	000 – 100	Guram Tushishvili	1 – 1
Women –57 kg	Momo Tamaoki	001 – 100	Eteri Liparteliani	1 – 2
Men –73 kg	Yudai Tanaka	000 (yellow card) – 100	Mikheili Bakhbakhashvili	1 – 3
Women –70 kg	Utana Terada	100 (yellow card) – 000	Mariam Tchanturia	2 – 3
Men –90 kg	Sanshiro Murao	010 (yellow card) – 100	Lasha Bekauri	2 – 4

==== Republic of Korea vs Germany ====
Weight Class	South Korea	Result	Germany	Score
Women +70 kg	Kim Ha-yun	100 – 000	Alina Böhm	1 – 0
Men +90 kg	Kim Min-jong	021 (yellow card) – 000 (yellow card)	Losseni Kone	2 – 0
Women –57 kg	Huh Mi-mi	020 – 000	Seija Ballhaus	3 – 0
Men –73 kg	Bae Dong-hyun	010 (yellow card) – 000	Jano Rübo	4 – 0
Women –70 kg	Lee Ye-rang	—	Giovanna Scoccimarro	—
Men –90 kg	Kim Jong-hoon	—	Eduard Trippel	—

=== Bronze medal matches ===
==== Italy vs Germany ====
Weight Class	Italy	Result	Germany	Score
Men +90 kg	Gennaro Pirelli	000 – 001	Losseni Kone	0 – 1
Women –57 kg	Giulia Carnà	000 (yellow card) – 001 (yellow card)	Seija Ballhaus	0 – 2
Men –73 kg	Giovanni Esposito	101 – 000	Igor Wandtke	1 – 2
Women –70 kg	Irene Pedrotti	000 – 001 (yellow card)	Miriam Butkereit	1 – 3
Men –90 kg	Christian Parlati	000 (yellow card) – 010	Eduard Trippel	1 – 4
Women +70 kg	Alice Bellandi	—	Alina Böhm	—

==== Brazil vs Japan ====
Weight Class	Brazil	Result	Japan	Score
Men +90 kg	Leonardo Gonçalves	000 – 010	Kanta Nakano	0 – 1
Women –57 kg	Jéssica Lima	000 – 100	Momo Tamaoki	0 – 2
Men –73 kg	Vinicius Ardina	000 – 110	Tatsuki Ishihara	0 – 3
Women –70 kg	Rafaela Silva	000 – 100 (yellow card)	Utana Terada	0 – 4
Men –90 kg	Rafael Macedo	—	Sanshiro Murao	—
Women +70 kg	Beatriz Souza	—	Ruri Takahashi	—

=== Gold medal match - Georgia vs Republic of Korea ===
Weight Class	Georgia	Result	South Korea	Score
Men +90 kg	Guram Tushishvili	000 (yellow card) – 100	Lee Seung-yeob	0 – 1
Women –57 kg	Eteri Liparteliani	100 – 000 (yellow card)	Huh Mi-mi	1 – 1
Men –73 kg	Mikheili Bakhbakhashvili	020 – 000 (yellow card)	Bae Dong-hyun	2 – 1
Women –70 kg	Mariam Tchanturia	021 (yellow card) – 000	Lee Ye-rang	3 – 1
Men –90 kg	Lasha Bekauri	100 – 000	Kim Jong-hoon	4 – 1
Women +70 kg	Sophio Somkhishvili	—	Lee Hyeon-ji	—

== Prize money ==
The sums listed bring the total prizes awarded to €200,000 for the event.

Medal	Total	Judoka	Coach
Gold	€90,000	€72,000	€18,000
Silver	€60,000	€48,000	€12,000
Bronze	€25,000	€20,000	€5,000
