= Mao Arai =

Japanese judoka (born 2003)

Personal information
- Native name: 新井 万央
- Born: 23 May 2003 (age 23) Japan
- Occupation: Judoka

Sport
- Country: Japan
- Sport: Judo
- Weight class: +78 kg

Achievements and titles
- World Champ.: (silver) (2025)
- Asian Champ.: (bronze) (2024)
Medal record
Women's judo
Representing Japan
World Championships
Gold medal – first place	2024 Abu Dhabi	Mixed team
Gold medal – first place	2026 Baku	Mixed team
Silver medal – second place	2025 Budapest	+78 kg
Bronze medal – third place	2025 Budapest	Mixed team
Asian Championships
Gold medal – first place	2024 Hong Kong	Mixed team
Bronze medal – third place	2024 Hong Kong	+78 kg
IJF Grand Slam
Gold medal – first place	2023 Tokyo	+78 kg
Gold medal – first place	2024 Tokyo	+78 kg
Gold medal – first place	2026 Ulaanbaatar	+78 kg
Bronze medal – third place	2025 Paris	+78 kg
Bronze medal – third place	2026 Paris	+78 kg
World Juniors Championships
Gold medal – first place	2022 Guayaquil	+78 kg
Gold medal – first place	2022 Guayaquil	Mixed team
Gold medal – first place	2023 Odivelas	+78 kg
Gold medal – first place	2023 Odivelas	Mixed team

Profile at external databases
- IJF: 56234
- JudoInside.com: 151250
- Updated on 11 October 2026

Mao Arai (Japanese: 新井 万央, Hepburn: Arai Mao; born 23 May 2003) is a Japanese judoka. She won a gold medal in the mixed team event at the 2024 World Judo Championships held in Abu Dhabi, United Arab Emirates. She is also a gold and bronze medalist from the 2024 Asian Championships, her older sister, Chizuru is also a former judoka who won gold in the 70 kg division at Tokyo 2020 Olympiad. Her younger brother, Naito Arai is also a judoka.

== Judo career ==
=== Early career ===
Arai began practicing judo at the age of 10 at the Igarashi Dojo. In her third year at Higashimatsuyama Kita Junior High School, she placed second in the over 70 kg class at the National Junior High School Judo Tournament. She then went on to Shukugawa High School, where in her first year, she lost in the third round of the over 78 kg class in the individual competition at the Inter-High School Championships, but placed second in the team competition. She then transferred to Saitama Sakae High School, where in her third year, she placed third in the Inter-High School team competition and won the individual competition with all ippon wins. She placed third in the All Japan Junior Championships. In 2022, she went on to Nippon Sport Science University.

=== 2022-2023 ===
In her first year, Arai faced Hilal Öztürk of Turkey in the final of the 2022 World Junior Championships, where she scored a waza-ari with an uchi-mata and then pinned her down, initially winning with a combination technique, but the ippon was revoked for grabbing below the belt and throwing her. Öztürk later won by ippon with an ouchigari to take the championship. In the team final, Arai defeated Öztürk with an arm lock to secure the team's victory against Turkey. In the 2022 All Japan Junior Championships, she defeated Miki Mukunoki, a first-year student at International Pacific University, who had placed third in the world junior division, to win the championship.

In the 2023 Belgian International, she defeated Mukunoki in the junior division final to win, but lost to the latter in the senior division final the following day and placed second. In her second year, she placed third in the weight class semi-finals, losing to Hikaru Kodama of SBC Shonan Beauty Clinic with an ouchigari. In the delayed 2021 World University Games, she lost her first match by disqualification to Agatha Martins Silva of Brazil. Although she won the team match, which was a best-of-three match, she did not have a chance to play in any matches from the first match to the final, as the player before her had already won. At the 2023 All Japan Junior Championships, she finished in second after losing to Mukunoki by waza-ari in the final. At the 2023 World Junior Championships, she won by disqualification against Mukunoki in the final, achieving her second consecutive victory in this tournament. In the team competition, she faced Celia Cancan of France in the final, and although she was first down by waza-ari, she came back to win with a kesagatatame to secure the team's victory. At the 2023 Grand Slam Tokyo, she defeated Israel's Raz Hershko by kuzure kesagatatame in the semifinals, and Léa Fontaine of France by kuzure kamishiho-gatame in the final to win the championship.

=== 2024- ===
At the 2024 Grand Slam Paris, Arai lost to Fontaine in the quarterfinals, then lost to Hershko by disqualification in the third-place deciding match, placing fifth. As a third-year student, she placed second in her weight class final, losing by waza-ari to Komatsu's Wakaharu Tomita. However, due to her recent achievements, she was selected to represent Japan at the 2024 World Championships. At the Asian Championships, Arai lost by disqualification to Mongolia's Amarsaikhany Adiyaasüren in the quarterfinals, but won the repechage round to finish third. In the team competition, she contributed to her team's victory by defeating Amarsaikhany by waza-ari in the final against Mongolia. At the 2024 World Championships in May, Arai lost by waza-ari to China's Xu Shiyan in the third round. Later in the championships, she won the semifinals against Uzbekistan, but her team won the championship before she had a chance to play in the final against France.
