= 2024 Judo Grand Slam Tokyo =

Judo competition

Judo 2024 Judo Grand Slam Tokyo
- Venue: Tokyo Metropolitan Gymnasium
- Location: Tokyo, Japan
- Dates: 7–8 December 2024
- Competitors: 274 from 44 nations
- Total prize money: €154,000

Competition at external databases
- Links: IJF • JudoInside

The 2024 Judo Grand Slam Tokyo is an edition of the Grand Slam Tokyo tournament, organised by the International Judo Federation. It was held at the Tokyo Metropolitan Gymnasium in Tokyo, Japan from 7 to 8 December 2024 as part of the IJF World Tour.

== Medal summary ==
=== Men's events ===
Event	Gold	Silver	Bronze
Extra-lightweight (−60 kg)	Taiki Nakamura (JPN)	Ryuju Nagayama (JPN)	Ayub Bliev (IJF)
Extra-lightweight (−60 kg)	Taiki Nakamura (JPN)	Ryuju Nagayama (JPN)	Kenta Sekimoto (JPN)
Half-lightweight (−66 kg)	Takeshi Takeoka (JPN)	Taikoh Fujisaka (JPN)	Obid Dzhebov (TJK)
Half-lightweight (−66 kg)	Takeshi Takeoka (JPN)	Taikoh Fujisaka (JPN)	Ryoma Tanaka (JPN)
Lightweight (−73 kg)	Ryuga Tanaka (JPN)	Tatsuki Ishihara (JPN)	Shusuke Uchimura (JPN)
Lightweight (−73 kg)	Ryuga Tanaka (JPN)	Tatsuki Ishihara (JPN)	Danil Lavrentev (IJF)
Half-middleweight (−81 kg)	Sotaro Fujiwara (JPN)	Timur Arbuzov (IJF)	François Gauthier-Drapeau (CAN)
Half-middleweight (−81 kg)	Sotaro Fujiwara (JPN)	Timur Arbuzov (IJF)	Yuhei Oino (JPN)
Middleweight (−90 kg)	Sanshiro Murao (JPN)	Luka Maisuradze (GEO)	Komei Kawabata (JPN)
Middleweight (−90 kg)	Sanshiro Murao (JPN)	Luka Maisuradze (GEO)	Goki Tajima (JPN)
Half-heavyweight (−100 kg)	Matvey Kanikovskiy (IJF)	Gennaro Pirelli (ITA)	Dota Arai (JPN)
Half-heavyweight (−100 kg)	Matvey Kanikovskiy (IJF)	Gennaro Pirelli (ITA)	Kyle Reyes (CAN)
Heavyweight (+100 kg)	Kanta Nakano (JPN)	Hyōga Ōta (JPN)	Yuta Nakamura (JPN)
Heavyweight (+100 kg)	Kanta Nakano (JPN)	Hyōga Ōta (JPN)	Denis Batchaev (IJF)

=== Women's events ===
Event	Gold	Silver	Bronze
Extra-lightweight (−48 kg)	Wakana Koga (JPN)	Mitsuki Kondo (JPN)	Hikari Yoshioka (JPN)
Extra-lightweight (−48 kg)	Wakana Koga (JPN)	Mitsuki Kondo (JPN)	Kano Miyaki (JPN)
Half-lightweight (−52 kg)	Kisumi Omori (JPN)	Kokoro Fujishiro (JPN)	Nanako Tsubone (JPN)
Half-lightweight (−52 kg)	Kisumi Omori (JPN)	Kokoro Fujishiro (JPN)	Bishreltiin Khorloodoi (UAE)
Lightweight (−57 kg)	Mika Adachi (JPN)	Megumi Fuchida (JPN)	Terbishiin Ariunzayaa (MGL)
Lightweight (−57 kg)	Mika Adachi (JPN)	Megumi Fuchida (JPN)	Martha Fawaz (FRA)
Half-middleweight (−63 kg)	Haruka Kaju (JPN)	Megu Danno (JPN)	Minami Aono (JPN)
Half-middleweight (−63 kg)	Haruka Kaju (JPN)	Megu Danno (JPN)	Renata Zachová (CZE)
Middleweight (−70 kg)	Mayu Honda (JPN)	Utana Terada (JPN)	Lara Cvjetko (CRO)
Middleweight (−70 kg)	Mayu Honda (JPN)	Utana Terada (JPN)	Rin Maeda (JPN)
Half-heavyweight (−78 kg)	Kurena Ikeda (JPN)	Kim Min-ju (KOR)	Patrícia Sampaio (POR)
Half-heavyweight (−78 kg)	Kurena Ikeda (JPN)	Kim Min-ju (KOR)	Mami Umeki (JPN)
Heavyweight (+78 kg)	Mao Arai (JPN)	Elis Startseva (IJF)	Ruri Takahashi (JPN)
Heavyweight (+78 kg)	Mao Arai (JPN)	Elis Startseva (IJF)	Chihiro Yamaguchi (JPN)

=== Medal table ===
* Host nation (Japan)

Rank	Nation	Gold	Silver	Bronze	Total
1	Japan (JPN)*	13	9	16	38
–	International Judo Federation (IJF)	1	2	3	6
2	Georgia (GEO)	0	1	0	1
2	Italy (ITA)	0	1	0	1
2	South Korea (KOR)	0	1	0	1
5	Canada (CAN)	0	0	2	2
6	Croatia (CRO)	0	0	1	1
6	Czech Republic (CZE)	0	0	1	1
6	France (FRA)	0	0	1	1
6	Mongolia (MGL)	0	0	1	1
6	Portugal (POR)	0	0	1	1
6	Tajikistan (TJK)	0	0	1	1
6	United Arab Emirates (UAE)	0	0	1	1
Totals (12 entries)		14	14	28	56

== Prize money ==
The sums written are per medalist, bringing the total prizes awarded to €154,000. (retrieved from:)

Medal	Total	Judoka	Coach
Gold	€5,000	€4,000	€1,000
Silver	€3,000	€2,400	€600
Bronze	€1,500	€1,200	€300
