= 2025 Judo Grand Slam Paris =

Judo competition

Judo 2025 Judo Grand Slam Paris
- Venue: Accor Arena
- Location: Paris, France
- Dates: 1–2 February 2025
- Competitors: 298 from 50 nations
- Total prize money: €154,000
- Website: Official website

Competition at external databases
- Links: IJF • JudoInside

The 2025 Judo Grand Slam Paris was held at the Accor Arena in Paris, France, from 1 to 2 February 2025 as part of the IJF World Tour. It is to be the first World Judo Tour event where the updated judo ruleset intended for the 2028 Los Angeles Olympic Games will be in use.

== Medal summary ==
=== Men's events ===
Event	Gold	Silver	Bronze
Extra-lightweight (−60 kg)	Romain Valadier-Picard (FRA)	Kenta Sekimoto (JPN)	Enzo Jean (FRA)
Extra-lightweight (−60 kg)	Romain Valadier-Picard (FRA)	Kenta Sekimoto (JPN)	Bakhrom Boturov (UZB)
Half-lightweight (−66 kg)	Ruslan Pashayev (AZE)	Daikii Bouba (FRA)	Walide Khyar (FRA)
Half-lightweight (−66 kg)	Ruslan Pashayev (AZE)	Daikii Bouba (FRA)	Vazha Margvelashvili (GEO)
Lightweight (−73 kg)	Shakhram Ahadov (UZB)	Akil Gjakova (KOS)	Maxime Gobert (FRA)
Lightweight (−73 kg)	Shakhram Ahadov (UZB)	Akil Gjakova (KOS)	Rashid Mammadaliyev (AZE)
Half-middleweight (−81 kg)	François Gauthier-Drapeau (CAN)	Nugzar Tatalashvili (UAE)	Matthias Casse (BEL)
Half-middleweight (−81 kg)	François Gauthier-Drapeau (CAN)	Nugzar Tatalashvili (UAE)	Omar Rajabli (AZE)
Middleweight (−90 kg)	Kim Jong-hoon (KOR)	Luka Maisuradze (GEO)	Goki Tajima (JPN)
Middleweight (−90 kg)	Kim Jong-hoon (KOR)	Luka Maisuradze (GEO)	Alexis Mathieu (FRA)
Half-heavyweight (−100 kg)	Dzhafar Kostoev (UAE)	Leonardo Gonçalves (BRA)	Arman Adamian (IJF)
Half-heavyweight (−100 kg)	Dzhafar Kostoev (UAE)	Leonardo Gonçalves (BRA)	Iván Felipe Silva Morales (CUB)
Heavyweight (+100 kg)	Inal Tasoev (IJF)	Lee Seung-yeob (KOR)	Toma Nikiforov (BEL)
Heavyweight (+100 kg)	Inal Tasoev (IJF)	Lee Seung-yeob (KOR)	Yuta Nakamura (JPN)

Source results:

=== Women's events ===
Event	Gold	Silver	Bronze
Extra-lightweight (−48 kg)	Mitsuki Kondo (JPN)	Shirine Boukli (FRA)	Wakana Koga (JPN)
Extra-lightweight (−48 kg)	Mitsuki Kondo (JPN)	Shirine Boukli (FRA)	Tara Babulfath (SWE)
Half-lightweight (−52 kg)	Kisumi Omori (JPN)	Kokoro Fujishiro (JPN)	Ayumi Leiva Sánchez (ESP)
Half-lightweight (−52 kg)	Kisumi Omori (JPN)	Kokoro Fujishiro (JPN)	Distria Krasniqi (KOS)
Lightweight (−57 kg)	Martha Fawaz (FRA)	Timna Nelson-Levy (ISR)	Ophélie Vellozzi (FRA)
Lightweight (−57 kg)	Martha Fawaz (FRA)	Timna Nelson-Levy (ISR)	Megumi Fuchida (JPN)
Half-middleweight (−63 kg)	Haruka Kaju (JPN)	Manon Deketer (FRA)	Nora Gjakova (KOS)
Half-middleweight (−63 kg)	Haruka Kaju (JPN)	Manon Deketer (FRA)	Melkia Auchecorne (FRA)
Middleweight (−70 kg)	Ai Tsunoda (ESP)	Mayu Honda (JPN)	Marie-Ève Gahié (FRA)
Middleweight (−70 kg)	Ai Tsunoda (ESP)	Mayu Honda (JPN)	Margit de Voogd (NED)
Half-heavyweight (−78 kg)	Patrícia Sampaio (POR)	Inbar Lanir (ISR)	Audrey Tcheuméo (FRA)
Half-heavyweight (−78 kg)	Patrícia Sampaio (POR)	Inbar Lanir (ISR)	Fanny Estelle Posvite (FRA)
Heavyweight (+78 kg)	Léa Fontaine (FRA)	Lee Hyeon-ji (KOR)	Raz Hershko (ISR)
Heavyweight (+78 kg)	Léa Fontaine (FRA)	Lee Hyeon-ji (KOR)	Mao Arai (JPN)

Source results:

=== Medal table ===
* Host nation (France)

Rank	Nation	Gold	Silver	Bronze	Total
1	France (FRA)*	3	3	9	15
2	Japan (JPN)	3	3	5	11
3	South Korea (KOR)	1	2	0	3
4	United Arab Emirates (UAE)	1	1	0	2
5	Azerbaijan (AZE)	1	0	2	3
6	Spain (ESP)	1	0	1	2
6	Uzbekistan (UZB)	1	0	1	2
–	International Judo Federation (IJF)	1	0	1	2
8	Canada (CAN)	1	0	0	1
8	Portugal (POR)	1	0	0	1
10	Israel (ISR)	0	2	1	3
11	Kosovo (KOS)	0	1	2	3
12	Georgia (GEO)	0	1	1	2
13	Brazil (BRA)	0	1	0	1
14	Belgium (BEL)	0	0	2	2
15	Cuba (CUB)	0	0	1	1
15	Netherlands (NED)	0	0	1	1
15	Sweden (SWE)	0	0	1	1
Totals (17 entries)		14	14	28	56

== Prize money ==
The sums written are per medalist, bringing the total prizes awarded to €154,000. (retrieved from:)

Medal	Total	Judoka	Coach
Gold	€5,000	€4,000	€1,000
Silver	€3,000	€2,400	€600
Bronze	€1,500	€1,200	€300
