= 2024 World Judo Championships =

Judo competition

2024 Judo World Judo Championships
- Venue: Mubadala Arena
- Location: Abu Dhabi, United Arab Emirates
- Dates: 19–24 May 2024
- Competitors: 658 from 107 nations
- Total prize money: €998,000
- Website: Official website

Competition at external databases
- Links: IJF • JudoInside

The 2024 World Judo Championships was held at the Mubadala Arena in Abu Dhabi, United Arab Emirates, from 19 to 24 May 2024 as part of the IJF World Tour and during the 2024 Summer Olympics qualification period, concluding with a mixed team event on the final day.

== Schedule ==
All times are local (UTC+4).

| Day | Date | Weight classes | | | | Preliminaries | Final Block |
| Day | Date | Men | | Women | | Preliminaries | Final Block |
|---|---|---|---|---|---|---|---|
| 1 | 19 May | 60 kg | | 48 kg | 52 kg | 11:00 | 18:00 |
| 2 | 20 May | 66 kg | 73 kg | 57 kg | | 10:30 | 18:00 |
| 3 | 21 May | 81 kg | | 63 kg | | 12:00 | 18:00 |
| 4 | 22 May | 90 kg | | 70 kg | 78 kg | 11:00 | 18:00 |
| 5 | 23 May | 100 kg | +100 kg | +78 kg | | 12:00 | 18:00 |
| 6 | 24 May | Mixed team | | | | 12:00 | 18:00 |

== Medal summary ==
=== Medal table ===
* Host nation (United Arab Emirates)

| Rank | Nation | Gold | Silver | Bronze | Total |
|---|---|---|---|---|---|
| 1 | Japan (JPN) | 4 | 2 | 4 | 10 |
| 2 | Georgia (GEO) | 2 | 1 | 2 | 5 |
| 3 | South Korea (KOR) | 2 | 0 | 3 | 5 |
| 4 | Azerbaijan (AZE) | 2 | 0 | 0 | 2 |
| 5 | France (FRA) | 1 | 2 | 3 | 6 |
| 6 | Italy (ITA) | 1 | 2 | 1 | 4 |
| 7 | Germany (GER) | 1 | 0 | 1 | 2 |
| 7 | Mongolia (MGL) | 1 | 0 | 1 | 2 |
| 9 | Netherlands (NED) | 1 | 0 | 0 | 1 |
| 10 | Canada (CAN) | 0 | 2 | 1 | 3 |
| – | Individual Neutral Athletes (AIN) (Note: Russian and Belarusian judokas participated as Individual Neutral Athletes as a result of sanctions imposed following the 2022 invasion of Ukraine. The IJF does not include the medals won by these judokas in the official medal table.) | 0 | 1 | 2 | 3 |
| 11 | Turkey (TUR) | 0 | 1 | 1 | 2 |
| 11 | Uzbekistan (UZB) | 0 | 1 | 1 | 2 |
| 13 | Chinese Taipei (TPE) | 0 | 1 | 0 | 1 |
| 13 | Poland (POL) | 0 | 1 | 0 | 1 |
| 13 | Serbia (SRB) | 0 | 1 | 0 | 1 |
| 16 | Spain (ESP) | 0 | 0 | 2 | 2 |
| 17 | Finland (FIN) | 0 | 0 | 1 | 1 |
| 17 | Great Britain (GBR) | 0 | 0 | 1 | 1 |
| 17 | Kazakhstan (KAZ) | 0 | 0 | 1 | 1 |
| 17 | Kosovo (KOS) | 0 | 0 | 1 | 1 |
| 17 | Kyrgyzstan (KGZ) | 0 | 0 | 1 | 1 |
| 17 | Sweden (SWE) | 0 | 0 | 1 | 1 |
| 17 | Switzerland (SUI) | 0 | 0 | 1 | 1 |
| 17 | Tajikistan (TJK) | 0 | 0 | 1 | 1 |
| Totals (24 entries) | | 15 | 15 | 30 | 60 |

=== Men's events ===
| Event | Gold | Silver | Bronze |
|---|---|---|---|
| Extra-lightweight (−60 kg) | Giorgi Sardalashvili; Georgia | Yang Yung-wei; Chinese Taipei | Taiki Nakamura; Japan |
| Extra-lightweight (−60 kg) | Giorgi Sardalashvili; Georgia | Yang Yung-wei; Chinese Taipei | Lee Ha-rim; South Korea |
| Half-lightweight (−66 kg) | Ryoma Tanaka; Japan | Takeshi Takeoka; Japan | Luukas Saha; Finland |
| Half-lightweight (−66 kg) | Ryoma Tanaka; Japan | Takeshi Takeoka; Japan | Vazha Margvelashvili; Georgia |
| Lightweight (−73 kg) | Hidayat Heydarov; Azerbaijan | Tatsuki Ishihara; Japan | Nils Stump; Switzerland |
| Lightweight (−73 kg) | Hidayat Heydarov; Azerbaijan | Tatsuki Ishihara; Japan | Lavjargalyn Ankhzayaa; Mongolia |
| Half-middleweight (−81 kg) | Tato Grigalashvili; Georgia | Timur Arbuzov; Individual Neutral Athletes | Somon Makhmadbekov; Tajikistan |
| Half-middleweight (−81 kg) | Tato Grigalashvili; Georgia | Timur Arbuzov; Individual Neutral Athletes | Lee Joon-hwan; South Korea |
| Middleweight (−90 kg) | Goki Tajima; Japan | Nemanja Majdov; Serbia | Erlan Sherov; Kyrgyzstan |
| Middleweight (−90 kg) | Goki Tajima; Japan | Nemanja Majdov; Serbia | Tristani Mosakhlishvili; Spain |
| Half-heavyweight (−100 kg) | Zelym Kotsoiev; Azerbaijan | Shady El Nahas; Canada | Dota Arai; Japan |
| Half-heavyweight (−100 kg) | Zelym Kotsoiev; Azerbaijan | Shady El Nahas; Canada | Nikoloz Sherazadishvili; Spain |
| Heavyweight (+100 kg) | Kim Min-jong; South Korea | Guram Tushishvili; Georgia | Alisher Yusupov; Uzbekistan |
| Heavyweight (+100 kg) | Kim Min-jong; South Korea | Guram Tushishvili; Georgia | Tamerlan Bashaev; Individual Neutral Athletes |

Source results:

=== Women's events ===
| Event | Gold | Silver | Bronze |
|---|---|---|---|
| Extra-lightweight (−48 kg) | Bavuudorjiin Baasankhüü; Mongolia | Assunta Scutto; Italy | Abiba Abuzhakynova; Kazakhstan |
| Extra-lightweight (−48 kg) | Bavuudorjiin Baasankhüü; Mongolia | Assunta Scutto; Italy | Tara Babulfath; Sweden |
| Half-lightweight (−52 kg) | Odette Giuffrida; Italy | Diyora Keldiyorova; Uzbekistan | Amandine Buchard; France |
| Half-lightweight (−52 kg) | Odette Giuffrida; Italy | Diyora Keldiyorova; Uzbekistan | Mascha Ballhaus; Germany |
| Lightweight (−57 kg) | Huh Mi-mi; South Korea | Christa Deguchi; Canada | Jessica Klimkait; Canada |
| Lightweight (−57 kg) | Huh Mi-mi; South Korea | Christa Deguchi; Canada | Momo Tamaoki; Japan |
| Half-middleweight (−63 kg) | Joanne van Lieshout; Netherlands | Angelika Szymańska; Poland | Clarisse Agbegnenou; France |
| Half-middleweight (−63 kg) | Joanne van Lieshout; Netherlands | Angelika Szymańska; Poland | Laura Fazliu; Kosovo |
| Middleweight (−70 kg) | Margaux Pinot; France | Marie-Ève Gahié; France | Shiho Tanaka; Japan |
| Middleweight (−70 kg) | Margaux Pinot; France | Marie-Ève Gahié; France | Madina Taimazova; Individual Neutral Athletes |
| Half-heavyweight (−78 kg) | Anna-Maria Wagner; Germany | Alice Bellandi; Italy | Madeleine Malonga; France |
| Half-heavyweight (−78 kg) | Anna-Maria Wagner; Germany | Alice Bellandi; Italy | Emma Reid; Great Britain |
| Heavyweight (+78 kg) | Wakaba Tomita; Japan | Kayra Ozdemir; Turkey | Kim Ha-yun; South Korea |
| Heavyweight (+78 kg) | Wakaba Tomita; Japan | Kayra Ozdemir; Turkey | Hilal Öztürk; Turkey |

Source results:

=== Mixed events ===
| Event | Gold | Silver | Bronze |
|---|---|---|---|
| Mixed team | Japan; Mao Arai; Mayu Honda; Tatsuki Ishihara; Komei Kawabata; Kanta Nakano; Hyōga Ōta; Goki Tajima; Ayami Takano; Momo Tamaoki; Ryuga Tanaka; Shiho Tanaka; Wakaba Tomita | France; Mathéo Akiana Mongo; Orlando Cazorla; Axel Clerget; Léa Fontaine; Joan-Benjamin Gaba; Priscilla Gneto; Coralie Hayme; Faïza Mokdar; Maxime-Gaël Ngayap Hambou; Margaux Pinot; Khamzat Saparbaev; Florine Soula | Georgia; Eter Askilashvili; Luka Babutsidze; Giorgi Chikhelidze; Saba Inaneishvili; Giorgi Jabniashvili; Nino Loladze; Sophio Somkhishvili; Georgi Terashvili; Guram Tushishvili |
| Mixed team | Japan; Mao Arai; Mayu Honda; Tatsuki Ishihara; Komei Kawabata; Kanta Nakano; Hyōga Ōta; Goki Tajima; Ayami Takano; Momo Tamaoki; Ryuga Tanaka; Shiho Tanaka; Wakaba Tomita | France; Mathéo Akiana Mongo; Orlando Cazorla; Axel Clerget; Léa Fontaine; Joan-Benjamin Gaba; Priscilla Gneto; Coralie Hayme; Faïza Mokdar; Maxime-Gaël Ngayap Hambou; Margaux Pinot; Khamzat Saparbaev; Florine Soula | Italy; Thauany David Capanni Dias; Giovanni Esposito; Nicholas Mungai; Christian Parlati; Manuel Parlati; Irene Pedrotti; Gennaro Pirelli; Kim Polling; Lorenzo Rigano; Erica Simonetti; Asya Tavano |

== Prize money ==
The sums written are per medalist, bringing the total prizes awarded to €798,000 for the individual events and €200,000 for the team event. (retrieved from:)

| Medal | Individual | | | Mixed team | | |
| Medal | Total | Judoka | Coach | Total | Judoka | Coach |
| Gold | €26,000 | €20,800 | €5,200 | €90,000 | €72,000 | €18,000 |
| Silver | €15,000 | €12,000 | €3,000 | €60,000 | €48,000 | €12,000 |
| Bronze | €8,000 | €6,400 | €1,600 | €25,000 | €20,000 | €5,000 |
