= 2023 World Judo Juniors Championships =

Judo competition

Judo 2023 World Judo Juniors Championships
- Venue: Sports complex Multiusos de Odivelas
- Location: Odivelas, Portugal
- Dates: 4–8 October 2023
- Competitors: 541 from 68 nations
- Total prize money: €99,800

Champions
- Mixed team: Japan (5th title)

Competition at external databases
- Links: IJF • JudoInside

The 2023 World Judo Juniors Championships was held in Odivelas, Portugal, from 4 to 8 October 2023 as part of the IJF World Tour and during the 2024 Summer Olympics qualification period. The mixed teams event took place on the competition's last day.

== Medal table ==
* Host nation (Portugal)

Rank	Nation	Gold	Silver	Bronze	Total
1	Japan	10	3	2	15
2	Azerbaijan	1	2	0	3
3	France	1	1	2	4
3	Italy	1	1	2	4
5	Georgia	1	1	0	2
6	South Korea	1	0	1	2
7	Turkey	0	2	1	3
8	Brazil	0	1	3	4
9	Netherlands	0	1	2	3
10	Israel	0	1	0	1
10	United States	0	1	0	1
10	Uzbekistan	0	1	0	1
–	Individual Neutral Athletes (AIN)	0	0	3	3
13	Kazakhstan	0	0	2	2
14	Austria	0	0	1	1
14	Belgium	0	0	1	1
14	Colombia	0	0	1	1
14	Croatia	0	0	1	1
14	Cyprus	0	0	1	1
14	Egypt	0	0	1	1
14	Latvia	0	0	1	1
14	Poland	0	0	1	1
14	Portugal	0	0	1	1
14	Slovenia	0	0	1	1
14	Spain	0	0	1	1
14	Tajikistan	0	0	1	1
Totals (25 entries)		15	15	30	60

== Medal summary ==
=== Men's events ===
Event	Gold	Silver	Bronze
Extra-lightweight (−60 kg)	Yamato Fukuda; Japan	Nizami Imranov; Azerbaijan	Youssry Samy; Egypt
Extra-lightweight (−60 kg)	Yamato Fukuda; Japan	Nizami Imranov; Azerbaijan	Talgat Orynbassar; Kazakhstan
Half-lightweight (−66 kg)	Yamato Fukuda; Japan	Eran Fiks; Israel	Zhanarys Rakhmetkali; Kazakhstan
Half-lightweight (−66 kg)	Yamato Fukuda; Japan	Eran Fiks; Israel	Keita Hadano; Japan
Lightweight (−73 kg)	Vusal Galandarzade; Azerbaijan	Jack Yonezuka; United States	Mouhammad Gazaloev; Belgium
Lightweight (−73 kg)	Vusal Galandarzade; Azerbaijan	Jack Yonezuka; United States	Abubakr Sherov; Tajikistan
Half-middleweight (−81 kg)	Kaito Amano; Japan	Aleksandre Loladze; Georgia	Naoto Izawa; Japan
Half-middleweight (−81 kg)	Kaito Amano; Japan	Aleksandre Loladze; Georgia	Timur Arbuzov (AIN)
Middleweight (−90 kg)	Komei Kawabata; Japan	Vugar Talibov; Azerbaijan	Aarón Santamaría Rodríguez; Spain
Middleweight (−90 kg)	Komei Kawabata; Japan	Vugar Talibov; Azerbaijan	Maksims Duinovs; Latvia
Half-heavyweight (−100 kg)	Dota Arai; Japan	Rustam Shorakhmatov; Uzbekistan	Andzhei Pavliukov (AIN)
Half-heavyweight (−100 kg)	Dota Arai; Japan	Rustam Shorakhmatov; Uzbekistan	Joës Schell; Netherlands
Heavyweight (+100 kg)	Shalva Gureshidze; Georgia	İbrahim Tataroğlu; Turkey	Münir Ertuğ; Turkey
Heavyweight (+100 kg)	Shalva Gureshidze; Georgia	İbrahim Tataroğlu; Turkey	Giannis Antoniou; Cyprus

Source results:

=== Women's events ===
Event	Gold	Silver	Bronze
Extra-lightweight (−48 kg)	Kano Miyaki; Japan	Sıla Ersin; Turkey	Asia Avanzato; Italy
Extra-lightweight (−48 kg)	Kano Miyaki; Japan	Sıla Ersin; Turkey	Kristina Dudina (AIN)
Half-lightweight (−52 kg)	Rin Kamiya; Japan	Giulia Carnà; Italy	Micaela Sciacovelli; Italy
Half-lightweight (−52 kg)	Rin Kamiya; Japan	Giulia Carnà; Italy	Léa Beres; France
Lightweight (−57 kg)	Veronica Toniolo; Italy	Riko Honda; Japan	Julie Beurskens; Netherlands
Lightweight (−57 kg)	Veronica Toniolo; Italy	Riko Honda; Japan	Beatriz Comanche; Brazil
Half-middleweight (−63 kg)	Melkia Auchecorne; France	Mizuki Takaki; Japan	Martyna Glubiak; Poland
Half-middleweight (−63 kg)	Melkia Auchecorne; France	Mizuki Takaki; Japan	Nina Simić; Croatia
Middleweight (−70 kg)	Mayu Honda; Japan	Kaillany Cardoso; Brazil	Kaja Schuster; Slovenia
Middleweight (−70 kg)	Mayu Honda; Japan	Kaillany Cardoso; Brazil	Elena Dengg; Austria
Half-heavyweight (−78 kg)	Kim Min-ju; South Korea	Lieke Derks; Netherlands	Brenda Olaya; Colombia
Half-heavyweight (−78 kg)	Kim Min-ju; South Korea	Lieke Derks; Netherlands	Ilana Bouvier; France
Heavyweight (+78 kg)	Mao Arai; Japan	Miki Mukunoki; Japan	Lee Hyeon-ji; South Korea
Heavyweight (+78 kg)	Mao Arai; Japan	Miki Mukunoki; Japan	Katia Alves; Brazil

Source results:

=== Mixed ===
Event	Gold	Silver	Bronze
Mixed team	Japan	France	Brazil
Mixed team	Japan	France	Portugal

Source results:

== Prize money ==
The sums written are per medalist, bringing the total prizes awarded to €79,800 for the individual contests and €20,000 for the team competition. (retrieved from:)

Medal	Individual			Mixed team		
Medal	Total	Judoka	Coach	Total	Judoka	Coach
Gold	€2,500	€2,000	€500	€8,000	€6,400	€1,600
Silver	€1,500	€1,200	€300	€5,600	€4,480	€1,120
Bronze	€850	€680	€170	€3,200	€2,560	€640
