= IJF World Tour =

Worldwide top-tier judo tour

The IJF World Tour is a worldwide top-tier judo tour, organized by the International Judo Federation since 2009.

The IJF World Tour consists of the annual World Championships and World Masters, a series of Grand Slam and Grand Prix tournaments, the annual continental championships and open meets organized by the respective continental judo unions, as well as the annual World Juniors Championships. Achievements in these competitions are rewarded with ranking points, which are then used to determine a judoka's world ranking.

== IJF World Ranking ==
=== 2025–2028 ===
IJF Ranking Events (2025–2028)
	Olympic Games	World Championships	World Masters	Grand Slam	Continental Championships	Grand Prix	World Juniors Championships	Continental Open
1st place	2,200	2,000	1,800	1,000	800	700		100
2nd place	1,540	1,400	1,260	700	560	490		70
3rd place	1,100	1,000	900	500	400	350		50
5th place	792	720	648	360	288	252		36
7th place	572	520	468	260	208	182		26
1\16th	352	320	288	160	128	112		16
1\32th	264	240	216	120	96	84		12
1 fight won	—	200	—	100	80	70		10
Participation	—	20	100	10	6			2
A. per category	1	2	no limit	2 \ 4 (Note: 4 for host, 2 for other countries)	2	2 \ 4	2	no limit
A. per country	7	9	no limit	14 \ 28	10	14 \ 28	9	no limit

=== 2017–2024 ===
IJF Ranking Events (2017–2024)
	Olympic Games	World Championships	World Masters	Grand Slam	Grand Prix	Continental Championships	World Juniors Championships	Continental Open
1st place	2,200	2,000	1,800	1,000	700			100
2nd place	1,540	1,400	1,260	700	490			70
3rd place	1,100	1,000	900	500	350			50
5th place	792	720	648	360	252			36
7th place	572	520	468	260	182			26
1\16th	352	320	288	160	112			16
1\32th	264	240	—	120	84			12
1 fight won	—	200	—	100	70			10
Participation	—	20	200	10	6			—
A. per category	1	2	no limit	2 \ 4 (Note: 4 for host, 2 for other countries)		2		no limit
A. per country	7	9	no limit	14 \ 28		10	9	no limit

=== 2013–2016 ===
IJF Ranking Events (2013–2016)
	Olympic Games	World Championships	World Masters	Grand Slam	Continental Championships	Grand Prix	Continental Open
1st place	1,000	900	700	500	400	300	100
2nd place	600	540	420	300	240	180	60
3rd place	400	360	280	200	160	120	40
5th place	200	180	140	100	80	60	20
7th place	160	144	112	80	64	48	16
1\16th	120	108	—	60	48	36	12
1\32th	80	72	—	40	32	24	8
1 fight won	40	36	28	20	16	12	4
Participation	—	4	—	2	2	2	—

== IJF World Tour tournaments ==
Legend

- OG — Olympic Games
- WC — World Championships
- JU — World Juniors Championships
- MA — World Masters
- GS — Grand Slam
- GP — Grand Prix
- AfC — African Championships
- AfG — African Games
- AmC — Pan American Championships
- AmG — Pan American Games
- AsC — Asian Championships
- AsG — Asian Games
- EuC — European Championships
- EuG — European Games
- OcC — Oceanian Championships

=== 2009–2019 ===
	2009	2010	2011	2012	2013	2014	2015	2016	2017	2018	2019
January		MA Suwon	MA Baku	MA Almaty				GP Havana		GP Tunis	GP Tel Aviv
February	GS Paris; GP Hamburg	GS Paris; GP Düsseldorf	GS Paris; GP Düsseldorf	GS Paris; GP Düsseldorf	GS Paris; GP Düsseldorf	GS Paris; GP Düsseldorf	GP Düsseldorf	GS Paris; GP Düsseldorf	GS Paris; GP Düsseldorf	GS Paris; GS Düsseldorf	GS Paris; GS Düsseldorf
March	AmC Buenos Aires				GP Samsun	GP Tbilisi; GP Samsun	GP Tbilisi; GP Samsun	GP Tbilisi	GS Baku; GP Tbilisi	GP Agadir; GS Ekaterinburg; GP Tbilisi	GP Marrakesh; GS Ekaterinburg; GP Tbilisi
April	AfC Port-Louis; EuC Tbilisi	AmC San Salvador; AfC Yaoundé; OcC Canberra; AsC Guangzhou; EuC Vienna	AmC Guadalajara; AsC Abu Dhabi; AfC Dakar; OcC Tahiti; EuC Istanbul	AfC Agadir; EuC Chelyabinsk; OcC Sydney; AsC Tashkent; AmC Montreal	OcC Cairns; AfC Maputo; AmC San José; AsC Bangkok; EuC Budapest	AfC Port-Louis; EuC Montpellier; AmC Guayaquil; OcC Auckland	OcC Païta; AfC Libreville; AmC Edmonton	GP Samsun; AfC Tunis; OcC Canberra; AsC Tashkent; EuC Kazan; AmC Havana	GP Antalya; AfC Antananarivo; EuC Warsaw; AmC Panama; OcC Nukuʻalofa	GP Antalya; OcC Nouméa; AfC Tunis; AmC San José; EuC Tel Aviv	GP Antalya; AsC Fujairah; AfC Cape Town; AmC Lima
May	GP Tunis; AsC Taipei; GS Moscow	GP Tunis; GS Rio de Janeiro	GP Baku; GS Moscow	GP Baku; GS Moscow	GS Baku; MA Tyumen	GS Baku	GP Zagreb; GS Baku; AsC Kuwait City; MA Rabat	GS Baku; GP Almaty; MA Guadalajara	GS Ekaterinburg; AsC Hong Kong	GP Hohhot	GS Baku; GP Hohhot
June			GS Rio de Janeiro	GS Rio de Janeiro	GP Miami	GP Havana; GP Budapest	GP Budapest; EuG Baku	GP Budapest	GP Cancún; GP Hohhot		EuG Minsk
July	GS Rio de Janeiro	GS Moscow		OG London	GP Ulaanbaatar; GS Moscow	GP Ulaanbaatar; GS Tyumen	GP Ulaanbaatar; AmG Toronto; GS Tyumen	GP Ulaanbaatar; GS Tyumen		GP Zagreb	GP Montreal; GP Budapest; GP Zagreb
August	WC Rotterdam		WC Paris		WC Rio de Janeiro	WC Chelyabinsk	WC Astana	OG Rio de Janeiro	WC Budapest	GP Budapest; AsG Jakarta	AmG Lima; AfG Rabat; WC Tokyo
September		WC Tokyo	AfG Maputo		GP Rijeka; GP Almaty	GP Zagreb; AsG Incheon	AfG Brazzaville	GP Zagreb	GP Zagreb	WC Baku	GP Tashkent
October	JU Paris	GP Rotterdam; JU Agadir	GP Abu Dhabi; AmG Guadalajara	GP Abu Dhabi	GP Tashkent; JU Ljubljana; GP Qingdao	GP Astana; GP Tashkent; JU F. Lauderdale; GS Abu Dhabi	GP Tashkent; GS Paris; JU Abu Dhabi; GS Abu Dhabi	GP Tashkent; GS Abu Dhabi	GP Tashkent; JU Zagreb; GS Abu Dhabi	GP Cancún; JU Nassau; GS Abu Dhabi	GS Brasilia; JU Marrakesh; GS Abu Dhabi
November	GP Abu Dhabi; GP Qingdao	AsG Guangzhou; GP Abu Dhabi	JU Cape Town; GP Amsterdam	GP Qingdao; GS Tokyo	GP Abu Dhabi; GS Tokyo	GP Qingdao; GP Jeju	GP Qingdao; GP Jeju	GP Qingdao	GP The Hague	GP Tashkent; GP The Hague; GS Osaka	GP Perth; GS Osaka
December	GS Tokyo	GS Tokyo; GP Qingdao	GS Tokyo; GP Qingdao		GP Jeju	GS Tokyo	GS Tokyo	GS Tokyo	GS Tokyo; MA S. Petersburg	MA Guangzhou	MA Qingdao
	2009	2010	2011	2012	2013	2014	2015	2016	2017	2018	2019

=== 2020–present ===
	2020	2021	2022	2023	2024	2025	2026	2027
January	GP Tel Aviv	MA Doha	GP Almada	GP Almada	GP Odivelas			
February	GS Paris; GS Düsseldorf	GS Tel Aviv	GS Paris; GS Tel Aviv	GS Paris; GS Tel Aviv	GS Paris; GS Baku	GS Paris; GS Baku; GS Tashkent	GS Paris; GS Tashkent	GS Paris; GS Baku
March		GS Tashkent; GS Tbilisi		GS Tashkent; GS Tbilisi; GS Antalya	GS Tashkent; GP Linz; GS Tbilisi; GS Antalya	GP Linz; GS Tbilisi	GP Linz; GS Tbilisi	GS Tashkent; GP Linz; GS Tbilisi
April		GS Antalya; AsC/OcC Bishkek; AmC Guadalajara; EuC Lisbon	GS Antalya; AmC/OcC Lima; EuC Sofia		AsC Hong Kong; AfC Cairo; EuC Zagreb; AmC/OcC Rio de Janeiro	EuC Podgorica; AsC Bangkok; AfC Abidjan; AmC/OcC Santiago	EuC Tbilisi; AmC Panama City; OcC Melbourne; AfC Nairobi	AmC TBD; EuC Apeldoorn; AfC Algiers; GS Dushanbe
May		GS Kazan; AfC Dakar	~~GS Kazan~~; AfC Oran	WC Doha; GP Linz	GS Dushanbe; GS Astana; WC Abu Dhabi	GS Dushanbe; GS Astana	GS Dushanbe; GS Astana	
June		WC Budapest	GS Tbilisi; ~~GS Düsseldorf~~; GS Ulaanbaatar	GP Dushanbe; GS Astana; GS Ulaanbaatar		WC Budapest	GS Ulaanbaatar; GP Qingdao	WC Astana; GS Ulaanbaatar
July		OG Tokyo	GS Budapest; GP Zagreb		OG Paris	GS Ulaanbaatar		GP Qingdao; OcC Tahiti
August			AsC Nur-Sultan; JU Guayaquil	MA Budapest; GP Zagreb			GP Lima; GS Lausanne	GS Lausanne
September		GP Zagreb		AfC Casablanca; AmC/OcC Calgary; GS Baku; AsG Hangzhou	GP Zagreb	GP Qingdao	GS Budapest	GP Lima
October	GS Budapest	JU Olbia; GS Paris	WC Tashkent; GS Abu Dhabi; GP Perth	JU Odivelas; GS Abu Dhabi	JU Dushanbe; GS Abu Dhabi	JU Lima; GP Lima; GP Guadalajara	WC Baku; GS Abu Dhabi	GS Budapest; JU Amman; GS Abu Dhabi
November	EuC Prague; AmC Guadalajara	GS Baku; GS Abu Dhabi	GS Baku	EuC Montpellier; GP Perth		GP Gold Coast; GP Zagreb; GS Abu Dhabi	GP Zagreb; JU Tashkent	GP Zagreb
December	AfC Antananarivo		GS Tokyo; MA Jerusalem	GS Tokyo	GS Tokyo	GS Tokyo	GS Tokyo; MA Dushanbe	GS Tokyo; MA TBD
	2020	2021	2022	2023	2024	2025	2026	2027

=== Tournaments per year (since 2009) ===
Year	Summer Olympics	World Championships	World Masters	Grand Slam	Grand Prix	Total
2009		1		4	4	9
2010		1	1	4	5	11
2011		1	1	4	5	11
2012	1		1	4	4	10
2013		1	1	4	10	16
2014		1		5	11	17
2015		1	1	5	9	16
2016	1		1	5	10	17
2017		1	1	5	8	15
2018		1	1	5	10	17
2019		1	1	7	10	19
2020				3	1	4
2021	1	1	1	8	1	12
2022		1	1	9	3	14
2023		1	1	10	5	17
2024	1	1		9	3	14
2025		1		9	6	16
2026		1	1	10	4	16
2027		1	1	10	4	16
Total	4	16	14	120	113	267

==== Grand Slam × Grand Prix comparison ====
- Grand Slam
- Grand Prix

== See also ==
- Qualification timeline for the 2008 Summer Olympics
- Qualification timeline for the 2004 Summer Olympics
- Qualification timeline for the 2000 Summer Olympics
