= 2024 Judo Grand Prix Zagreb =

Judo Competition

Judo 2024 Judo Grand Prix Zagreb
- Venue: Arena Zagreb
- Location: Zagreb, Croatia
- Dates: 13–15 September 2024
- Competitors: 319 from 40 nations
- Total prize money: €98,000

Competition at external databases
- Links: IJF • JudoInside

The 2024 Judo Grand Prix Zagreb was held at the Arena Zagreb in Zagreb, Croatia, from 13 to 15 September 2024 as part of the IJF World Tour.

== Medal summary ==
=== Men's events ===
Event	Gold	Silver	Bronze
Extra-lightweight (−60 kg)	Sherzod Davlatov (KAZ)	Ahmad Yusifov (AZE)	Enzo Jean (FRA)
Extra-lightweight (−60 kg)	Sherzod Davlatov (KAZ)	Ahmad Yusifov (AZE)	Turan Bayramov (AZE)
Half-lightweight (−66 kg)	Zhanarys Rakhmetkali (KAZ)	Michael Fryer (GBR)	Ruslan Pashayev (AZE)
Half-lightweight (−66 kg)	Zhanarys Rakhmetkali (KAZ)	Michael Fryer (GBR)	Tengo Zirakashvili (GEO)
Lightweight (−73 kg)	Dániel Szegedi (HUN)	Giovanni Esposito (ITA)	Robert Klačar (CRO)
Lightweight (−73 kg)	Dániel Szegedi (HUN)	Giovanni Esposito (ITA)	Zelemkhan Batchaev (BEL)
Half-middleweight (−81 kg)	Victor Sterpu (MDA)	Gabriel Falcão (BRA)	Arnaud Aregba (FRA)
Half-middleweight (−81 kg)	Victor Sterpu (MDA)	Gabriel Falcão (BRA)	Leonardo Casaglia (ITA)
Middleweight (−90 kg)	Péter Sáfrány (HUN)	Marcelo Gomes (BRA)	Akaki Japaridze (GEO)
Middleweight (−90 kg)	Péter Sáfrány (HUN)	Marcelo Gomes (BRA)	Mark van Dijk (NED)
Half-heavyweight (−100 kg)	Anton Savytskiy (UKR)	Rhys Thompson (GBR)	Zaur Dunyamaliyev (UKR)
Half-heavyweight (−100 kg)	Anton Savytskiy (UKR)	Rhys Thompson (GBR)	Iosif Simin (ISR)
Heavyweight (+100 kg)	Kanta Nakano (JPN)	Grzegorz Teresiński (POL)	Lucas Lima (BRA)
Heavyweight (+100 kg)	Kanta Nakano (JPN)	Grzegorz Teresiński (POL)	Movli Borchashvilli (AUT)

Source results:

=== Women's events ===
Event	Gold	Silver	Bronze
Extra-lightweight (−48 kg)	Wakana Koga (JPN)	Galiya Tynbayeva (KAZ)	Anais Perrot (FRA)
Extra-lightweight (−48 kg)	Wakana Koga (JPN)	Galiya Tynbayeva (KAZ)	Amber Gersjes (NED)
Half-lightweight (−52 kg)	Kisumi Omori (JPN)	Ayumi Leiva Sánchez (ESP)	Tereza Bodnárová (CZE)
Half-lightweight (−52 kg)	Kisumi Omori (JPN)	Ayumi Leiva Sánchez (ESP)	Leonie Gonzalez (FRA)
Lightweight (−57 kg)	Faïza Mokdar (FRA)	Ana Viktorija Puljiz (CRO)	Martha Fawaz (FRA)
Lightweight (−57 kg)	Faïza Mokdar (FRA)	Ana Viktorija Puljiz (CRO)	Flaka Loxha (KOS)
Half-middleweight (−63 kg)	Kirari Yamaguchi (JPN)	Manon Deketer (FRA)	Iva Oberan (CRO)
Half-middleweight (−63 kg)	Kirari Yamaguchi (JPN)	Manon Deketer (FRA)	Nauana Silva (BRA)
Middleweight (−70 kg)	Sanne Vermeer (NED)	Maya Kogan (ISR)	Shiho Tanaka (JPN)
Middleweight (−70 kg)	Sanne Vermeer (NED)	Maya Kogan (ISR)	Lara Cvjetko (CRO)
Half-heavyweight (−78 kg)	Sanne van Dijke (NED)	Karla Prodan (CRO)	Lieke Derks (NED)
Half-heavyweight (−78 kg)	Sanne van Dijke (NED)	Karla Prodan (CRO)	Coralie Godbout (CAN)
Heavyweight (+78 kg)	Coralie Hayme (FRA)	Yuli Alma Mishiner (ISR)	Giovanna Santos (BRA)
Heavyweight (+78 kg)	Coralie Hayme (FRA)	Yuli Alma Mishiner (ISR)	Erica Simonetti (ITA)

Source results:

=== Medal table ===
* Host nation (Croatia)

Rank	Nation	Gold	Silver	Bronze	Total
1	Japan (JPN)	4	0	1	5
2	France (FRA)	2	1	5	8
3	Kazakhstan (KAZ)	2	1	0	3
4	Netherlands (NED)	2	0	3	5
5	Hungary (HUN)	2	0	0	2
6	Ukraine (UKR)	1	0	1	2
7	Moldova (MDA)	1	0	0	1
8	Brazil (BRA)	0	2	3	5
8	Croatia (CRO)*	0	2	3	5
10	Israel (ISR)	0	2	1	3
11	Great Britain (GBR)	0	2	0	2
12	Azerbaijan (AZE)	0	1	2	3
12	Italy (ITA)	0	1	2	3
14	Poland (POL)	0	1	0	1
14	Spain (ESP)	0	1	0	1
16	Georgia (GEO)	0	0	2	2
17	Austria (AUT)	0	0	1	1
17	Belgium (BEL)	0	0	1	1
17	Canada (CAN)	0	0	1	1
17	Czech Republic (CZE)	0	0	1	1
17	Kosovo (KOS)	0	0	1	1
Totals (21 entries)		14	14	28	56

== Prize money ==
The sums written are per medalist, bringing the total prizes awarded to €98,000. (retrieved from:)

Medal	Total	Judoka	Coach
Gold	€3,000	€2,400	€600
Silver	€2,000	€1,600	€400
Bronze	€1,000	€800	€200
