= Shinsei Hattori =

Japanese judoka

Personal information
- Born: 13 May 2004 (age 22)
- Occupation: Judoka

Sport
- Country: Japan
- Sport: Judo
- Weight class: ‍–‍66 kg
- Rank: 3rd dan black belt
- Club: Tokai University

Achievements and titles
- Asian Champ.: (silver) (2024)
Medal record
Men's judo
Representing Japan
Asian Games
Gold medal – first place	2026 Aichi–Nagoya	Mixed team
Asian Championships
Silver medal – second place	2024 Hong Kong	‍–‍66 kg
Silver medal – second place	2024 Hong Kong	Mixed team
IJF Grand Slam
Silver medal – second place	2022 Tokyo	‍–‍66 kg
Silver medal – second place	2026 Tashkent	‍–‍66 kg
Silver medal – second place	2026 Lausanne	‍–‍66 kg
Bronze medal – third place	2025 Tokyo	‍–‍66 kg
IJF Grand Prix
Bronze medal – third place	2024 Odivelas	‍–‍66 kg
World University Games
Gold medal – first place	2021 Chengdu	‍–‍66 kg

Profile at external databases
- IJF: 71858
- JudoInside.com: 157343
- Updated on 12 October 2026

Shinsei Hattori (Japanese: 服部 辰成; born 13 May 2004) is a Japanese judoka who competes in the men's 66 kg division. He represents Tokai University and has won medals at international competitions, including the Asian Judo Championships, the World University Games and the International Judo Federation World Judo Tour. He was part of Japan's gold-medal-winning mixed team at the 2026 Asian Games.

== Career ==
Hattori attended Tokai University Sagami Junior High School and Tokai University Sagami High School before continuing his education at Tokai University. He competes in the men's 66 kg weight class and has represented Japan in national and international judo competitions.

In December 2022, Hattori won the silver medal in the men's 66 kg division at the Tokyo Grand Slam. In July 2023, he won gold at the Chengdu Summer World University Games, defeating Radu Izvoreanu of Moldova in the final with an ippon in less than five seconds.

At the 2024 Asian Judo Championships in Hong Kong, Hattori won the silver medal in the men's 66 kg category. Japan also won the mixed-team competition, giving him a team gold medal at the same championships. In January 2024, he had previously earned bronze at the Portugal Grand Prix.

Hattori won the men's 66 kg title at the Kodokan Cup All-Japan Judo Championships by Weight Category in November 2025. The following month, he took bronze at the Tokyo Grand Slam. In February 2026, he reached the final of the Tashkent Grand Slam, where he won silver. In April, he won the men's 66 kg title at the All-Japan Selected Judo Championships.

In August 2026, Hattori won silver at the Lausanne Grand Slam after reaching the final against fellow Japanese judoka Kairi Kentoku. The IJF reported that Hattori's recent results included silver at the Tashkent Grand Slam and bronze at the 2025 Tokyo Grand Slam.

At the 2026 Asian Games in Aichi and Nagoya, Hattori competed in the men's 66 kg event, where he lost in the second round to Bahrain's Sukhrob Bokiev. He subsequently competed in the mixed-team event, in which Japan won the gold medal.
