= 2026 Judo Grand Slam Lausanne =

Judo competition

Judo 2026 Judo Grand Slam Lausanne
- Venue: Vaudoise aréna
- Location: Lausanne, Switzerland
- Dates: 28–30 August 2026
- Competitors: 513 from 77 nations
- Total prize money: €154,000
- Website: Official website

Competition at external databases
- Links: IJF • JudoInside

The 2026 Judo Grand Slam Lausanne is a Judo Grand Slam tournament that was held at the Vaudoise Aréna in Lausanne, Switzerland from 28 to 30 August 2026 as part of the IJF World Tour and during the 2028 Summer Olympics qualification period.

== Medal summary ==
=== Men's events ===
Event	Gold	Silver	Bronze
Extra-lightweight (−60 kg)	Yamato Fukuda (JPN)	Lee Ha-rim (KOR)	Samariddin Kuchkarov (UZB)
Extra-lightweight (−60 kg)	Yamato Fukuda (JPN)	Lee Ha-rim (KOR)	Michel Augusto (BRA)
Half-lightweight (−66 kg)	Kairi Kentoku (JPN)	Shinsei Hattori (JPN)	David García Torné (ESP)
Half-lightweight (−66 kg)	Kairi Kentoku (JPN)	Shinsei Hattori (JPN)	Ramazan Abdulaev (RUS)
Lightweight (−73 kg)	Daniel Cargnin (BRA)	Danil Lavrentev (RUS)	Muhiddin Asadulloev (TJK)
Lightweight (−73 kg)	Daniel Cargnin (BRA)	Danil Lavrentev (RUS)	Said-Magomed Khalidov (UKR)
Half-middleweight (−81 kg)	Abylaikhan Zhubanazar (KAZ)	Arslonbek Tojiev (UZB)	Aurélien Bonferroni (SUI)
Half-middleweight (−81 kg)	Abylaikhan Zhubanazar (KAZ)	Arslonbek Tojiev (UZB)	Omar Rajabli (AZE)
Middleweight (−90 kg)	Umar Bozorov (UZB)	Nurbek Murtozoev (UZB)	Nemanja Majdov (SRB)
Middleweight (−90 kg)	Umar Bozorov (UZB)	Nurbek Murtozoev (UZB)	Egor Andoni (RUS)
Half-heavyweight (−100 kg)	Ilia Sulamanidze (GEO)	Simeon Catharina (NED)	Said Sadrudinov (BHR)
Half-heavyweight (−100 kg)	Ilia Sulamanidze (GEO)	Simeon Catharina (NED)	Ernazar Sarsenbaev (UZB)
Heavyweight (+100 kg)	Inal Tasoev (RUS)	Martti Puumalainen (FIN)	Guram Tushishvili (GEO)
Heavyweight (+100 kg)	Inal Tasoev (RUS)	Martti Puumalainen (FIN)	Kanta Nakano (JPN)

=== Women's events ===
Event	Gold	Silver	Bronze
Extra-lightweight (−48 kg)	Marina Vorobeva (RUS)	Laura Martínez (ESP)	Clarice Ribeiro (BRA)
Extra-lightweight (−48 kg)	Marina Vorobeva (RUS)	Laura Martínez (ESP)	Hui Xinran (CHN)
Half-lightweight (−52 kg)	Gefen Primo (ISR)	Blandine Pont (FRA)	Ariane Toro (ESP)
Half-lightweight (−52 kg)	Gefen Primo (ISR)	Blandine Pont (FRA)	Rafaela Rodrigues (BRA)
Lightweight (−57 kg)	Eteri Liparteliani (GEO)	Sarah-Léonie Cysique (FRA)	Ayami Takano (JPN)
Lightweight (−57 kg)	Eteri Liparteliani (GEO)	Sarah-Léonie Cysique (FRA)	Giulia Carnà (ITA)
Half-middleweight (−63 kg)	Angelika Szymańska (POL)	Manon Deketer (FRA)	Clarisse Agbegnenou (FRA)
Half-middleweight (−63 kg)	Angelika Szymańska (POL)	Manon Deketer (FRA)	Kirari Yamaguchi (JPN)
Middleweight (−70 kg)	Miriam Butkereit (GER)	Giovanna Scoccimarro (GER)	Liu Lu (CHN)
Middleweight (−70 kg)	Miriam Butkereit (GER)	Giovanna Scoccimarro (GER)	Madina Taimazova (RUS)
Half-heavyweight (−78 kg)	Anna Monta Olek (GER)	Yelyzaveta Lytvynenko (UAE)	Kaïla Issoufi (FRA)
Half-heavyweight (−78 kg)	Anna Monta Olek (GER)	Yelyzaveta Lytvynenko (UAE)	Patrícia Sampaio (POR)
Heavyweight (+78 kg)	Léa Fontaine (FRA)	Romane Dicko (FRA)	Mariia Ivanova (RUS)
Heavyweight (+78 kg)	Léa Fontaine (FRA)	Romane Dicko (FRA)	Yuli Alma Mishiner (ISR)

=== Medal table ===
* Host nation (Switzerland)

Rank	Nation	Gold	Silver	Bronze	Total
1	Russia (RUS)	2	1	4	7
2	Japan (JPN)	2	1	3	6
3	Germany (GER)	2	1	0	3
4	Georgia (GEO)	2	0	1	3
5	France (FRA)	1	4	2	7
6	Uzbekistan (UZB)	1	2	2	5
7	Brazil (BRA)	1	0	3	4
8	Israel (ISR)	1	0	1	2
9	Kazakhstan (KAZ)	1	0	0	1
9	Poland (POL)	1	0	0	1
11	Spain (ESP)	0	1	2	3
12	Finland (FIN)	0	1	0	1
12	Netherlands (NED)	0	1	0	1
12	South Korea (KOR)	0	1	0	1
12	United Arab Emirates (UAE)	0	1	0	1
16	China (CHN)	0	0	2	2
17	Azerbaijan (AZE)	0	0	1	1
17	Bahrain (BHR)	0	0	1	1
17	Italy (ITA)	0	0	1	1
17	Portugal (POR)	0	0	1	1
17	Serbia (SRB)	0	0	1	1
17	Switzerland (SUI)*	0	0	1	1
17	Tajikistan (TJK)	0	0	1	1
17	Ukraine (UKR)	0	0	1	1
Totals (24 entries)		14	14	28	56

== Prize money ==
The sums written are per medalist, bringing the total prizes awarded to €154,000. (retrieved from:)

Medal	Total	Judoka	Coach
Gold	€5,000	€4,000	€1,000
Silver	€3,000	€2,400	€600
Bronze	€1,500	€1,200	€300
