= Judo at the 2025 Summer World University Games – Men's 73 kg =

Men's 73 kg at the 2025 Summer World University Games
- Venue: Messe Essen
- Location: Essen
- Dates: 24 July
- Competitors: 31

Medalists
gold medal	Adil Osmanov	Moldova
silver medal	Armen Agaian	Individual Neutral Athletes
bronze medal	Hans-Jorris Ahibo	France
bronze medal	Ryuga Tanaka	Japan

The men's 73 kg at the 2025 Summer World University Games in Rhine-Ruhr, Germany was held 24 July 2025. Adil Osmanov of Moldova captured the gold medal. Armen Agaian of Individual Neutral Athletes took home the silver medal. The bronze medals were awarded to Hans-Jorris Ahibo of France and Ryuga Tanaka of Japan.

== Schedule ==
All times are Central European Time (UTC+1)

Date	Time	Event
24 July 2015	10:00	Preliminary Rounds
24 July 2015	17:00	Final Block

== Results ==
Athletes advanced through direct knockout rounds—including the round of 32, round of 16, quarterfinals, and semifinals—to determine the two finalists fighting for the gold and silver medals. Parallel to the main bracket, a repechage system allowed defeated quarterfinalists to work their way back into the tournament, culminating in two separate bronze medal matches where the repechage winners faced the losing semifinalists.

Round of 32
F Pérez (CHI)	020
T Kumar (IND)	000
N Thijssen (NED)	000
T Zirakashvili (GEO)	100
R Marinx (BEL)	000
N Mirzayev (AZE)	011 (yellow card)
M Ravshanov (UZB)	100
S Badrakh (MGL)	000
M Loo (SGP)	000
J Pec (POL)	020
Á Szabó (HUN)	101
A Raulušonis (LTU)	000
S Nebotov (UKR)	010
J González (ECU)	000
R Tanaka (JPN)	100
Á Cano (ESP)	000
K Abeltshauser (GER)	110
K Kammoun (LBN)	000
D Koibagar (KAZ)	100
B Şengür (TUR)	000
F Ruiz (COL)	000
HJ Ahibo (FRA)	020
A Agaian (AIN)	100 (yellow card)
Chang Kh (TPE)	000
An Jh (KOR)	001
A Dukarič (SLO)	000
D Cena (KOS)	000
N Bakirdinov (KGZ)	100
G Oliveira (BRA)	010
A Jen (USA)	000 (yellow card)

Round of 16
A Osmanov (MDA)	101
F Pérez (CHI)	000 (yellow card)
T Zirakashvili (GEO)	000 (yellow card)
N Mirzayev (AZE)	002
M Ravshanov (UZB)	022
J Pec (POL)	010
Á Szabó (HUN)	001 (yellow card)
S Nebotov (UKR)	000 (yellow card)
R Tanaka (JPN)	110
K Abeltshauser (GER)	000
D Koibagar (KAZ)	010
HJ Ahibo (FRA)	011
A Agaian (AIN)	010
An Jh (KOR)	000
N Bakirdinov (KGZ)	000
G Oliveira (BRA)	011

Quarter-finals
A Osmanov (MDA)	020
N Mirzayev (AZE)	000
M Ravshanov (UZB)	000 (yellow card)
Á Szabó (HUN)	011 (yellow card)
R Tanaka (JPN)	000 (yellow card)
HJ Ahibo (FRA)	010
A Agaian (AIN)	011
G Oliveira (BRA)	001

Semi-finals
A Osmanov (MDA)	010 (yellow card)
Á Szabó (HUN)	000
HJ Ahibo (FRA)	000
A Agaian (AIN)	020

Final
A Osmanov (MDA)	004
A Agaian (AIN)	001

Repechage Phases

Repechage
N Mirzayev (AZE)	001
M Ravshanov (UZB)	000
R Tanaka (JPN)	010 (yellow card)
G Oliveira (BRA)	000 (yellow card)

Bronze medal
N Mirzayev (AZE)	000 (yellow card)
HJ Ahibo (FRA)	100
R Tanaka (JPN)	100
Á Szabó (HUN)	001 (yellow card)
