= Goki Tajima =

Japanese judoka (born 1997)

Personal information
- Born: 27 July 1997 (age 29) Chiba Prefecture, Japan
- Occupation: Judoka

Sport
- Country: Japan
- Sport: Judo
- Weight class: ‍–‍90 kg

Achievements and titles
- World Champ.: (gold) (2024)
- Asian Champ.: R16 (2023)
- Highest world ranking: 2^{nd}
Medal record
Men's judo
Representing Japan
World Championships
Gold medal – first place	2022 Tashkent	Mixed team
Gold medal – first place	2023 Doha	Mixed team
Gold medal – first place	2024 Abu Dhabi	‍–‍90 kg
Gold medal – first place	2024 Abu Dhabi	Mixed team
Gold medal – first place	2026 Baku	Mixed team
Silver medal – second place	2025 Budapest	‍–‍90 kg
Silver medal – second place	2026 Baku	‍–‍90 kg
Bronze medal – third place	2025 Budapest	Mixed team
Asian Games
Gold medal – first place	2023 Hangzhou	Mixed team
IJF Grand Slam
Gold medal – first place	2026 Paris	‍–‍90 kg
Silver medal – second place	2025 Tokyo	‍–‍90 kg
Bronze medal – third place	2019 Ekaterinburg	‍–‍90 kg
Bronze medal – third place	2023 Tbilisi	‍–‍90 kg
Bronze medal – third place	2024 Tokyo	‍–‍90 kg
Bronze medal – third place	2025 Paris	‍–‍90 kg
IJF Grand Prix
Bronze medal – third place	2026 Qingdao	‍–‍90 kg
World Juniors Championships
Gold medal – first place	2017 Zagreb	‍–‍90 kg
Gold medal – first place	2017 Zagreb	Mixed team

Profile at external databases
- IJF: 41969
- JudoInside.com: 116500
- Updated on 11 October 2026

Goki Tajima (田嶋 剛希, Tajima Goki; born 27 July 1997) is a Japanese judoka who competes in the men's 90 kg division. He is a four-time gold medalist at the World Judo Championships, three of them in the mixed team competition.

== Career ==
=== Early career ===
Tajima began practicing judo at the age of five under the guidance of his parents. He belonged to the Shimoshizu Judo Club until elementary school, and then went to Kokushikan Junior High School. After Kokushikan Junior High School, he went on to Kokushikan High School, where in his second year he won the 90 kg class and team competition at the All Japan High School Championships, achieving a double crown. In his third year, he won the Kinshuki Cup, and also won the Inter-High team competition with classmate Iori Yamada and one year younger Kentaro Iida, achieving a triple crown in the high school team competition (All Japan High School Championships, Kinshuki Cup, and Inter-High).

=== 2016–2019 ===
In 2016, Tajima entered the University of Tsukuba, where he placed third in the championship tournament in his first year. In his second year, he placed third again in the championship tournament. He also placed third in the All Japan Junior Championships, but was suddenly selected as a substitute for the winner of the World Junior Championships along with Nippon Sport Science University freshman Koji Nagai, who placed second in the tournament, due to an injury to Shintori Tsuyoshi, a second-year student at Meiji University. At the 2017 World Judo Juniors Championships, he won consecutive matches by ippon with seoi nage and sode tsurikomi goshi to advance to the finals, where he won all five matches by ippon, including defeating Robert Florentino of the Dominican Republic with a seoi nage, to win the championship. In the first mixed team tournament, he won by ippon up to the semi-finals, and in the final against the Netherlands, he won with a seoi-nage waza-ari, contributing to the team's victory.

In his third year of the All-Japan Student Judo Championship, Tajima made it to the finals of the championship tournament and drew with Tokai University, and then Takeshi Sasaki lost in the representative match, so the team finished in second place. In the student weight class, he suffered a bleeding head injury in the semi-finals, but in the final he defeated Shinsuke Yokouchi, a junior at university, with a seoi-nage to win the championship. At the time, he commented, "The Japanese team is narrowed down, but I want to do my best with the mindset of breaking in." He placed second in the weight class. In the Kodokan Cup final, he faced JRA's Mashu Baker, a gold medalist at the 2016 Summer Olympics, and although he won first with a waza-ari, he was defeated by a combined technique and finished second. In the Grand Slam Osaka, he lost in the second round. At the Judo Grand Slam Ekaterinburg in March 2019, he defeated former world champion Nemanja Majdov of Serbia by waza-ari in the second round, but lost to Georgia's Beka Gviniashvili by uranage in the quarterfinals. He then defeated Aleksandar Kukor of Serbia by combined techniques to place third. In his fourth year, he defeated 100 kg class Kentaro Iida by o-soto-gari in the semifinals of the championship tournament against Kokushikan University, pushing his team to the finals, and then defeated 150 kg class Takumi Shimizu by combined techniques against Tokai University, but the team lost and finished second. At the Summer Universiade, he lost by disqualification to Davlat Bobonov of Uzbekistan in the third round. He finished third in the team competition. He also finished third in the Kodokan Cup.

=== 2020–2022 ===
In April 2020, Tajima joined Park24. In the April 2021 weight class, he lost to Masuyama Kaho, a junior at the company, by disqualification in the final and placed second. At the 2021 Judo Grand Slam Baku in November, he lost to local Azerbaijan's Mammadali Mehdiyev by waza-ari in the quarterfinals, and lost to Gviniashvili by disqualification in the third-place deciding match, finishing in fifth place. In the April 2022 weight class, Tajima defeated Nagasawa Kenta, a senior at the company, by seoi-nage in the semifinals, but lost to Masuyama by disqualification in the final, just like the previous year. He was selected as a member of the world team. At the All-Japan Strengthened Athlete Selection Tournament in May, he won the final by defeating Mashu Baker of the JRA by waza-ari. At the World Championships in October, Tajima won all his matches, including an ippon victory in the final against France, helping his team win the championship. In the following Kodokan Cup, he lost to Baker by disqualification in the semifinals and finished third.

=== 2023–present ===
In the Grand Slam Paris in February 2023, Tajima lost by disqualification to Czech Republic's David Klammert in the second round. In the Grand Slam Tbilisi in March, he lost by Sumi-otoshi to local Georgian Olympic champion Lasha Bekauri in the quarterfinals, but then defeated local Georgian Gviniashvili with sode-tsurikomi-goshi in the repechage to finish third. He was also selected as a member of the World Championships. In April, he won the weight class by defeating Baker by waza-ari in the final. In the following All Japan Championships, he won all of his matches by ippon, including a disqualification win against Chofu Kogyo's Harazawa Hisayoshi, a silver medalist in the over 100 kg class, in the quarterfinals, and advanced to the semifinals, where he won by ippon and advanced to the semifinals, where he lost by waza-ari to Asahi Kasei's Ojitani Takeshi, but still placed third in the 90 kg class. In the World Championships in May, Tajima defeated world champion Luka Maisuradze with a waza-ari in the quarterfinals against Georgia, Frank de Wit with a sode-tsurikomi-goshi in the semifinals against the Netherlands, and France with a waza-ari in the finals, winning all three matches and winning the championship for his team. In the Business Team Championship in June, he placed second. In the following Grand Slam Ulaanbaatar, he lost his first match to Mikhail Igolnikov of Russia, who was competing as a neutral athlete, by combined waza. In the Asian Games in September, he lost by disqualification to Han Ju-yeop of South Korea in the second round. In the team competition, he won his first match against Nepal, but in the semifinals against South Korea and the final against Uzbekistan, the team won before he had a chance to play. In the Kodokan Cup, he lost by waza-ari in the final to Mori Kenshin, a fourth-year student at Meiji University, and placed second.

At the 2024 World Judo Championships, Tajima won his first individual world title by beating Serbian Nemanja Majdov in the final.
