= 2024 Judo Grand Prix Odivelas =

Judo competition

Judo 2024 Judo Grand Prix Odivelas
- Venue: Sports complex Multiusos de Odivelas
- Location: Odivelas, Portugal
- Dates: 26–28 January 2024
- Competitors: 624 from 90 nations
- Total prize money: €98,000

Competition at external databases
- Links: IJF • EJU • JudoInside

The 2024 Judo Grand Prix Odivelas was held at the Pavilhão Multiusos de Odivelas in Odivelas, Portugal, from 26 to 28 January 2024 as part of the IJF World Tour and during the 2024 Summer Olympics qualification period.

== Medal summary ==
=== Men's events ===
| Event | Gold | Silver | Bronze |
|---|---|---|---|
| Extra-lightweight (−60 kg) | Dilshodbek Baratov (UZB) | Michel Augusto (BRA) | Turan Bayramov (AZE) |
| Extra-lightweight (−60 kg) | Dilshodbek Baratov (UZB) | Michel Augusto (BRA) | Yang Yung-wei (TPE) |
| Half-lightweight (−66 kg) | Yago Abuladze (AIN) | Yashar Najafov (AZE) | Kamran Suleymanov (AZE) |
| Half-lightweight (−66 kg) | Yago Abuladze (AIN) | Yashar Najafov (AZE) | Shinsei Hattori (JPN) |
| Lightweight (−73 kg) | Danil Lavrentev (AIN) | Salvador Cases (ESP) | Makhmadbek Makhmadbekov (AIN) |
| Lightweight (−73 kg) | Danil Lavrentev (AIN) | Salvador Cases (ESP) | Ryuga Tanaka (JPN) |
| Half-middleweight (−81 kg) | Yoshito Hojo (JPN) | Vedat Albayrak (TUR) | Saeid Mollaei (AZE) |
| Half-middleweight (−81 kg) | Yoshito Hojo (JPN) | Vedat Albayrak (TUR) | Lee Joon-hwan (KOR) |
| Middleweight (−90 kg) | Mihael Žgank (TUR) | Klen-Kristofer Kaljulaid (EST) | Mark van Dijk (NED) |
| Middleweight (−90 kg) | Mihael Žgank (TUR) | Klen-Kristofer Kaljulaid (EST) | Eljan Hajiyev (AZE) |
| Half-heavyweight (−100 kg) | Matvey Kanikovskiy (AIN) | Nikoloz Sherazadishvili (ESP) | Rafael Buzacarini (BRA) |
| Half-heavyweight (−100 kg) | Matvey Kanikovskiy (AIN) | Nikoloz Sherazadishvili (ESP) | Batkhuyagiin Gonchigsüren (MGL) |
| Heavyweight (+100 kg) | Inal Tasoev (AIN) | Kim Min-jong (KOR) | Kanta Nakano (JPN) |
| Heavyweight (+100 kg) | Inal Tasoev (AIN) | Kim Min-jong (KOR) | Tamerlan Bashaev (AIN) |

=== Women's events ===
| Event | Gold | Silver | Bronze |
|---|---|---|---|
| Extra-lightweight (−48 kg) | Hikari Yoshioka (JPN) | Kano Miyaki (JPN) | Abiba Abuzhakynova (KAZ) |
| Extra-lightweight (−48 kg) | Hikari Yoshioka (JPN) | Kano Miyaki (JPN) | Ganbaataryn Narantsetseg (MGL) |
| Half-lightweight (−52 kg) | Diyora Keldiyorova (UZB) | Réka Pupp (HUN) | Mascha Ballhaus (GER) |
| Half-lightweight (−52 kg) | Diyora Keldiyorova (UZB) | Réka Pupp (HUN) | Glafira Borisova (AIN) |
| Lightweight (−57 kg) | Huh Mi-mi (KOR) | Daria Kurbonmamadova (AIN) | Ayami Takano (JPN) |
| Lightweight (−57 kg) | Huh Mi-mi (KOR) | Daria Kurbonmamadova (AIN) | Seija Ballhaus (GER) |
| Half-middleweight (−63 kg) | Lucy Renshall (GBR) | Katharina Haecker (AUS) | Szofi Özbas (HUN) |
| Half-middleweight (−63 kg) | Lucy Renshall (GBR) | Katharina Haecker (AUS) | Inbal Shemesh (ISR) |
| Middleweight (−70 kg) | Barbara Matić (CRO) | Gulnoza Matniyazova (UZB) | Riho Saiganji (JPN) |
| Middleweight (−70 kg) | Barbara Matić (CRO) | Gulnoza Matniyazova (UZB) | Miriam Butkereit (GER) |
| Half-heavyweight (−78 kg) | Anna Monta Olek (GER) | Metka Lobnik (SLO) | Petrunjela Pavić (CRO) |
| Half-heavyweight (−78 kg) | Anna Monta Olek (GER) | Metka Lobnik (SLO) | Chloé Buttigieg (FRA) |
| Heavyweight (+78 kg) | Hilal Öztürk (TUR) | Miki Mukunoki (JPN) | Kinga Wolszczak (POL) |
| Heavyweight (+78 kg) | Hilal Öztürk (TUR) | Miki Mukunoki (JPN) | Coralie Hayme (FRA) |

=== Medal table ===
* Host nation (Portugal)

| Rank | Nation | Gold | Silver | Bronze | Total |
|---|---|---|---|---|---|
| – | Individual Neutral Athletes (AIN) | 4 | 1 | 3 | 8 |
| 1 | Japan (JPN) | 2 | 2 | 5 | 9 |
| 2 | Turkey (TUR) | 2 | 1 | 0 | 3 |
| 2 | Uzbekistan (UZB) | 2 | 1 | 0 | 3 |
| 4 | South Korea (KOR) | 1 | 1 | 1 | 3 |
| 5 | Germany (GER) | 1 | 0 | 3 | 4 |
| 6 | Croatia (CRO) | 1 | 0 | 1 | 2 |
| 7 | Great Britain (GBR) | 1 | 0 | 0 | 1 |
| 8 | Spain (ESP) | 0 | 2 | 0 | 2 |
| 9 | Azerbaijan (AZE) | 0 | 1 | 4 | 5 |
| 10 | Brazil (BRA) | 0 | 1 | 1 | 2 |
| 10 | Hungary (HUN) | 0 | 1 | 1 | 2 |
| 12 | Australia (AUS) | 0 | 1 | 0 | 1 |
| 12 | Estonia (EST) | 0 | 1 | 0 | 1 |
| 12 | Slovenia (SLO) | 0 | 1 | 0 | 1 |
| 15 | France (FRA) | 0 | 0 | 2 | 2 |
| 15 | Mongolia (MGL) | 0 | 0 | 2 | 2 |
| 17 | Chinese Taipei (TPE) | 0 | 0 | 1 | 1 |
| 17 | Israel (ISR) | 0 | 0 | 1 | 1 |
| 17 | Kazakhstan (KAZ) | 0 | 0 | 1 | 1 |
| 17 | Netherlands (NED) | 0 | 0 | 1 | 1 |
| 17 | Poland (POL) | 0 | 0 | 1 | 1 |
| Totals (21 entries) | | 14 | 14 | 28 | 56 |

== Prize money ==
The sums written are per medalist, bringing the total prizes awarded to €98,000. (retrieved from:)

| Medal | Total | Judoka | Coach |
|---|---|---|---|
| Gold | €3,000 | €2,400 | €600 |
| Silver | €2,000 | €1,600 | €400 |
| Bronze | €1,000 | €800 | €200 |
