= Lee Hyeon-ji =

South Korean judoka (born 2007)

Personal information
- Born: 25 February 2007 (age 19)
- Occupation: Judoka

Sport
- Country: South Korea
- Sport: Judo
- Weight class: +78 kg

Achievements and titles
- World Champ.: (gold) (2026)
- Asian Champ.: (gold) (2024)
- Highest world ranking: 1^{st}
Medal record
Women's judo
Representing South Korea
World Championships
Gold medal – first place	2026 Baku	+78 kg
Silver medal – second place	2025 Budapest	Mixed team
Bronze medal – third place	2025 Budapest	+78 kg
Asian Games
Silver medal – second place	2026 Aichi‑Nagoya	+78 kg
Asian Championships
Gold medal – first place	2024 Hong Kong	+78 kg
Silver medal – second place	2026 Ordos	+78 kg
Bronze medal – third place	2025 Bangkok	+78 kg
IJF Grand Slam
Gold medal – first place	2025 Astana	+78 kg
Gold medal – first place	2025 Tokyo	+78 kg
Silver medal – second place	2025 Paris	+78 kg
Bronze medal – third place	2024 Tbilisi	+78 kg
Bronze medal – third place	2024 Dushanbe	+78 kg
IJF Grand Prix
Gold medal – first place	2025 Qingdao	+78 kg
World Juniors Championships
Gold medal – first place	2024 Dushanbe	+78 kg
Bronze medal – third place	2023 Odivelas	+78 kg
Bronze medal – third place	2024 Dushanbe	Mixed team
Asian Junior Championships
Gold medal – first place	2022 Bangkok	+78 kg
Gold medal – first place	2024 Mungyeong	+78 kg
World Cadets Championships
Gold medal – first place	2023 Zagreb	+70 kg
Asian Cadet Championships
Gold medal – first place	2023 Tashkent	+70 kg

Profile at external databases
- IJF: 69432
- JudoInside.com: 157337
- Updated on 10 October 2026

Lee Hyeon-ji (born 25 February 2007) is a South Korean judoka. She won a bronze medal at the 2025 World Championships in the women's +78 kg event.
