= 2022 Judo Grand Slam Kazan =

Cancelled judo competition

Judo 2022 Judo Grand Slam Kazan
- Location: Kazan, Russia
- Dates: ~~20–22 May 2022~~ — Cancelled

Competition at external databases
- Links: IJF • EJU • JudoInside

The 2022 Judo Grand Slam Kazan was originally scheduled to be held in Kazan, Tatarstan, Russia, from 20 to 22 May 2022. On 25 February, the International Judo Federation cancelled the competition in Russia in reaction to the Russian invasion of Ukraine.
