= Hyōga Ōta =

Japanese judoka (born 1997)

Personal information
- Born: 9 December 1997 (age 28)
- Occupation: Judoka

Sport
- Country: Japan
- Sport: Judo
- Weight class: +100 kg

Achievements and titles
- World Champ.: R16 (2025)
- Asian Champ.: (gold) (2024)
- Highest world ranking: 2^{nd}
Medal record
Men's judo
Representing Japan
World Championships
Gold medal – first place	2022 Tashkent	Mixed team
Gold medal – first place	2024 Abu Dhabi	Mixed team
Bronze medal – third place	2025 Budapest	Mixed team
Asian Games
Gold medal – first place	2023 Hangzhou	Mixed team
Gold medal – first place	2026 Aichi‑Nagoya	Mixed team
Silver medal – second place	2026 Aichi‑Nagoya	+100 kg
Asian Championships
Gold medal – first place	2024 Hong Kong	+100 kg
IJF Grand Slam
Gold medal – first place	2018 Ekaterinburg	+100 kg
Gold medal – first place	2022 Tokyo	+100 kg
Gold medal – first place	2024 Tashkent	+100 kg
Gold medal – first place	2025 Baku	+100 kg
Gold medal – first place	2025 Astana	+100 kg
Silver medal – second place	2019 Osaka	+100 kg
Silver medal – second place	2023 Paris	+100 kg
Silver medal – second place	2024 Tokyo	+100 kg
Silver medal – second place	2025 Tokyo	+100 kg
Silver medal – second place	2026 Paris	+100 kg
Bronze medal – third place	2016 Tokyo	+100 kg
IJF Grand Prix
Silver medal – second place	2023 Zagreb	+100 kg
Silver medal – second place	2026 Qingdao	+100 kg
Asian Junior Championships
Gold medal – first place	2015 Bangkok	+100 kg
World Cadets Championships
Gold medal – first place	2013 Miami	+90 kg
Summer Universiade
Gold medal – first place	2017 Taipei	Open

Profile at external databases
- IJF: 13212
- JudoInside.com: 19001
- Updated on 2 October 2026

Hyōga Ōta (born 9 December 1997) is a Japanese judoka.

Ōta is the gold medallist of the 2018 Judo Grand Slam Ekaterinburg in the +100 kg category.
