= Ryuga Tanaka =

Japanese judoka (born 2004)

Personal information
- Born: 17 June 2004 (age 22)
- Occupation: Judoka

Sport
- Country: Japan
- Sport: Judo
- Weight class: ‍–‍73 kg

Achievements and titles
- World Champ.: (gold) (2026)
Medal record
Men's judo
Representing Japan
World Championships
Gold medal – first place	2026 Baku	‍–‍73 kg
Gold medal – first place	2026 Baku	Mixed team
IJF Grand Slam
Gold medal – first place	2024 Tokyo	‍–‍73 kg
Gold medal – first place	2025 Tokyo	‍–‍73 kg
IJF Grand Prix
Bronze medal – third place	2024 Odivelas	‍–‍73 kg
World Juniors Championships
Gold medal – first place	2022 Guayaquil	‍–‍73 kg
World University Games
Gold medal – first place	2025 Rhine‑Ruhr	Mixed team
Bronze medal – third place	2025 Rhine‑Ruhr	‍–‍73 kg

Profile at external databases
- IJF: 69037
- JudoInside.com: 155443
- Updated on 11 October 2026

Ryuga Tanaka (田中龍雅, Tanaka Ryuga; born 17 June 2004) is a Japanese judoka. He won a gold medal at the 2026 World Judo Championships.

== Career ==
In December 2024, Tanaka competed at the 2024 Judo Grand Slam Tokyo and won his first career Judo Grand Slam gold medal in the –73 kg category. He repeated as Judo Grand Slam Tokyo champion in 2025.

In July 2025, he competed at the 2025 Summer World University Games and won a bronze medal in the –73 kg category. He also won a gold medal in the mixed team event.

In October 2026, he made his World Judo Championships debut and advanced to the finals of the –73 kg category. During the final he defeated Makhmadbek Makhmadbekov to win a gold medal. He also helped Japan win a gold medal in the mixed team event. This was Japan's eighth gold medal in the event at the World Judo Championships and first since 2024.

== Personal life ==
Tanaka's older brother, Ryoma, is also a judoka.
