= 2024 Asian Judo Championships =

Judo competition

2024 Judo Asian Judo Championships
- Venue: Star Hall, KITEC
- Location: Hong Kong, China
- Dates: 20–23 April 2024
- Competitors: 273 from 36 nations

Competition at external databases
- Links: IJF • JudoInside

The 2024 Asian Judo Championships was held from 20 to 23 April 2024 at the Star Hall, KITEC in Hong Kong, China as part of the IJF World Tour and during the 2024 Summer Olympics qualification period. The last day of competition featured a mixed team event.

== Medal table ==
Rank	Nation	Gold	Silver	Bronze	Total
1	Japan (JPN)	8	2	4	14
2	Mongolia (MGL)	3	4	5	12
3	South Korea (KOR)	2	4	3	9
4	United Arab Emirates (UAE)	1	2	1	4
5	Uzbekistan (UZB)	1	1	5	7
6	Chinese Taipei (TPE)	0	1	1	2
6	North Korea (PRK)	0	1	1	2
8	Kazakhstan (KAZ)	0	0	4	4
9	Tajikistan (TJK)	0	0	3	3
10	China (CHN)	0	0	2	2
11	Kyrgyzstan (KGZ)	0	0	1	1
Totals (11 entries)		15	15	30	60

== Medal summary ==
=== Men's events ===
Event	Gold	Silver	Bronze
Extra-lightweight (−60 kg)	Taiki Nakamura; Japan	Yang Yung-wei; Chinese Taipei	Doston Ruziev; Uzbekistan
Extra-lightweight (−60 kg)	Taiki Nakamura; Japan	Yang Yung-wei; Chinese Taipei	Byambajavyn Tsogt-Ochir; Mongolia
Half-lightweight (−66 kg)	Battogtokhyn Erkhembayar; Mongolia	Shinsei Hattori; Japan	Zhanarys Rakhmetkali; Kazakhstan
Half-lightweight (−66 kg)	Battogtokhyn Erkhembayar; Mongolia	Shinsei Hattori; Japan	Sardor Nurillaev; Uzbekistan
Lightweight (−73 kg)	Tatsuki Ishihara; Japan	Murodjon Yuldoshev; Uzbekistan	Kim Chol-gwang; North Korea
Lightweight (−73 kg)	Tatsuki Ishihara; Japan	Murodjon Yuldoshev; Uzbekistan	Lee Eun-kyul; South Korea
Half-middleweight (−81 kg)	Lee Joon-hwan; South Korea	Nugzar Tatalashvili; United Arab Emirates	Yuhei Oino; Japan
Half-middleweight (−81 kg)	Lee Joon-hwan; South Korea	Nugzar Tatalashvili; United Arab Emirates	Somon Makhmadbekov; Tajikistan
Middleweight (−90 kg)	Sanshiro Murao; Japan	Gantulgyn Altanbagana; Mongolia	Erlan Sherov; Kyrgyzstan
Middleweight (−90 kg)	Sanshiro Murao; Japan	Gantulgyn Altanbagana; Mongolia	Han Ju-yeop; South Korea
Half-heavyweight (−100 kg)	Muzaffarbek Turoboyev; Uzbekistan	Dzhafar Kostoev; United Arab Emirates	Batkhuyagiin Gonchigsüren; Mongolia
Half-heavyweight (−100 kg)	Muzaffarbek Turoboyev; Uzbekistan	Dzhafar Kostoev; United Arab Emirates	Dzhakhongir Madzhidov; Tajikistan
Heavyweight (+100 kg)	Hyōga Ōta; Japan	Kim Min-jong; South Korea	Magomedomar Magomedomarov; United Arab Emirates
Heavyweight (+100 kg)	Hyōga Ōta; Japan	Kim Min-jong; South Korea	Temur Rakhimov; Tajikistan

Source results:

=== Women's events ===
Event	Gold	Silver	Bronze
Extra-lightweight (−48 kg)	Bavuudorjiin Baasankhüü; Mongolia	Lee Hye-kyeong; South Korea	Galiya Tynbayeva; Kazakhstan
Extra-lightweight (−48 kg)	Bavuudorjiin Baasankhüü; Mongolia	Lee Hye-kyeong; South Korea	Kano Miyaki; Japan
Half-lightweight (−52 kg)	Bishreltiin Khorloodoi; United Arab Emirates	Kokoro Fujishiro; Japan	Lkhagvasürengiin Sosorbaram; Mongolia
Half-lightweight (−52 kg)	Bishreltiin Khorloodoi; United Arab Emirates	Kokoro Fujishiro; Japan	Diyora Keldiyorova; Uzbekistan
Lightweight (−57 kg)	Lkhagvatogoogiin Enkhriilen; Mongolia	Huh Mi-mi; South Korea	Akari Omori; Japan
Lightweight (−57 kg)	Lkhagvatogoogiin Enkhriilen; Mongolia	Huh Mi-mi; South Korea	Cai Qi; China
Half-middleweight (−63 kg)	Kirari Yamaguchi; Japan	Boldyn Gankhaich; Mongolia	Esmigul Kuyulova; Kazakhstan
Half-middleweight (−63 kg)	Kirari Yamaguchi; Japan	Boldyn Gankhaich; Mongolia	Kim Ji-su; South Korea
Middleweight (−70 kg)	Saki Niizoe; Japan	Mun Song-hui; North Korea	Shokhista Nazarova; Uzbekistan
Middleweight (−70 kg)	Saki Niizoe; Japan	Mun Song-hui; North Korea	Batsuuriin Nyam-Erdene; Mongolia
Half-heavyweight (−78 kg)	Rika Takayama; Japan	Yoon Hyun-ji; South Korea	Otgonbayaryn Khüslen; Mongolia
Half-heavyweight (−78 kg)	Rika Takayama; Japan	Yoon Hyun-ji; South Korea	Hsu Wang Shu-huei; Chinese Taipei
Heavyweight (+78 kg)	Lee Hyeon-ji; South Korea	Amarsaikhany Adiyaasüren; Mongolia	Mao Arai; Japan
Heavyweight (+78 kg)	Lee Hyeon-ji; South Korea	Amarsaikhany Adiyaasüren; Mongolia	Liang Ye; China

Source results:

=== Mixed events ===
Event	Gold	Silver	Bronze
Mixed team	Japan	Mongolia	Kazakhstan
Mixed team	Japan	Mongolia	Uzbekistan

Source results:

== Participating nations ==
272 competitors from 36 nations competed.

- Afghanistan (2)
- Bahrain (6)
- Bhutan (2)
- Cambodia (2)
- China (13)
- Chinese Taipei (16)
- Hong Kong (7)
- India (18)
- Indonesia (5)
- Japan (15)
- Jordan (2)
- Kazakhstan (18)
- Kyrgyzstan (8)
- Kuwait (6)
- Laos (1)
- Lebanon (3)
- Macau (4)
- Malaysia (1)
- Mongolia (18)
- Nepal (1)
- North Korea (5)
- Palestine (2)
- Philippines (16)
- Qatar (2)
- Saudi Arabia (6)
- South Korea (18)
- Sri Lanka (2)
- Syria (2)
- Thailand (2)
- Tajikistan (9)
- Turkmenistan (11)
- United Arab Emirates (8)
- Uzbekistan (17)
- Vietnam (11)
- Yemen (2)
