= 2023 Judo Grand Slam Tokyo =

Judo Competition

Judo 2023 Judo Grand Slam Tokyo
- Venue: Tokyo Metropolitan Gymnasium
- Location: Tokyo, Japan
- Dates: 2–3 December 2023
- Competitors: 506 from 84 nations
- Total prize money: $154,000

Competition at external databases
- Links: IJF • EJU • JudoInside

The 2023 Judo Grand Slam Tokyo was an installment of the Grand Slam Tokyo tournament held in Tokyo, Japan, from 2 to 3 December 2023 as part of the IJF World Tour and during the 2024 Summer Olympics qualification period.

== Medal summary ==
=== Men's events ===
Event	Gold	Silver	Bronze
Extra-lightweight (−60 kg)	Ryuju Nagayama (JPN)	Naohisa Takato (JPN)	Taiki Nakamura (JPN)
Extra-lightweight (−60 kg)	Ryuju Nagayama (JPN)	Naohisa Takato (JPN)	Ayub Bliev (AIN)
Half-lightweight (−66 kg)	Hifumi Abe (JPN)	Yondonperenlein Baskhüü (MGL)	Denis Vieru (MDA)
Half-lightweight (−66 kg)	Hifumi Abe (JPN)	Yondonperenlein Baskhüü (MGL)	Hekim Agamämmedow (TKM)
Lightweight (−73 kg)	Hidayat Heydarov (AZE)	Soichi Hashimoto (JPN)	Giorgi Terashvili (GEO)
Lightweight (−73 kg)	Hidayat Heydarov (AZE)	Soichi Hashimoto (JPN)	Manuel Lombardo (ITA)
Half-middleweight (−81 kg)	Lee Joon-hwan (KOR)	Matthias Casse (BEL)	David Karapetyan (AIN)
Half-middleweight (−81 kg)	Lee Joon-hwan (KOR)	Matthias Casse (BEL)	Zelim Tckaev (AZE)
Middleweight (−90 kg)	Sanshiro Murao (JPN)	Luka Maisuradze (GEO)	Mikhail Igolnikov (AIN)
Middleweight (−90 kg)	Sanshiro Murao (JPN)	Luka Maisuradze (GEO)	Christian Parlati (ITA)
Half-heavyweight (−100 kg)	Matvey Kanikovskiy (AIN)	Dota Arai (JPN)	Michael Korrel (NED)
Half-heavyweight (−100 kg)	Matvey Kanikovskiy (AIN)	Dota Arai (JPN)	Zelym Kotsoiev (AZE)
Heavyweight (+100 kg)	Tamerlan Bashaev (AIN)	Kim Min-jong (KOR)	Inal Tasoev (AIN)
Heavyweight (+100 kg)	Tamerlan Bashaev (AIN)	Kim Min-jong (KOR)	Lukáš Krpálek (CZE)

=== Women's events ===
Event	Gold	Silver	Bronze
Extra-lightweight (−48 kg)	Natsumi Tsunoda (JPN)	Julia Figueroa (ESP)	Kano Miyaki (JPN)
Extra-lightweight (−48 kg)	Natsumi Tsunoda (JPN)	Julia Figueroa (ESP)	Catarina Costa (POR)
Half-lightweight (−52 kg)	Uta Abe (JPN)	Astride Gneto (FRA)	Lkhagvasürengiin Sosorbaram (MGL)
Half-lightweight (−52 kg)	Uta Abe (JPN)	Astride Gneto (FRA)	Gefen Primo (ISR)
Lightweight (−57 kg)	Christa Deguchi (CAN)	Jéssica Lima (BRA)	Jessica Klimkait (CAN)
Lightweight (−57 kg)	Christa Deguchi (CAN)	Jéssica Lima (BRA)	Lien Chen-ling (TPE)
Half-middleweight (−63 kg)	Miku Takaichi (JPN)	Kirari Yamaguchi (JPN)	Joanne van Lieshout (NED)
Half-middleweight (−63 kg)	Miku Takaichi (JPN)	Kirari Yamaguchi (JPN)	Mizuki Takaki (JPN)
Middleweight (−70 kg)	Sanne van Dijke (NED)	Shiho Tanaka (JPN)	Ai Tsunoda (ESP)
Middleweight (−70 kg)	Sanne van Dijke (NED)	Shiho Tanaka (JPN)	Serafima Moscalu (ROU)
Half-heavyweight (−78 kg)	Mayra Aguiar (BRA)	Inbar Lanir (ISR)	Yoon Hyun-ji (KOR)
Half-heavyweight (−78 kg)	Mayra Aguiar (BRA)	Inbar Lanir (ISR)	Rika Takayama (JPN)
Heavyweight (+78 kg)	Mao Arai (JPN)	Léa Fontaine (FRA)	Raz Hershko (ISR)
Heavyweight (+78 kg)	Mao Arai (JPN)	Léa Fontaine (FRA)	Park Saet-byeol (KOR)

Source results:

=== Medal table ===
* Host nation (Japan)

Rank	Nation	Gold	Silver	Bronze	Total
1	Japan (JPN)*	7	5	4	16
–	Individual Neutral Athletes (AIN)	2	0	4	6
2	South Korea (KOR)	1	1	2	4
3	Brazil (BRA)	1	1	0	2
4	Azerbaijan (AZE)	1	0	2	3
4	Netherlands (NED)	1	0	2	3
6	Canada (CAN)	1	0	1	2
7	France (FRA)	0	2	0	2
8	Israel (ISR)	0	1	2	3
9	Georgia (GEO)	0	1	1	2
9	Mongolia (MGL)	0	1	1	2
9	Spain (ESP)	0	1	1	2
12	Belgium (BEL)	0	1	0	1
13	Italy (ITA)	0	0	2	2
14	Chinese Taipei (TPE)	0	0	1	1
14	Czech Republic (CZE)	0	0	1	1
14	Moldova (MDA)	0	0	1	1
14	Portugal (POR)	0	0	1	1
14	Romania (ROU)	0	0	1	1
14	Turkmenistan (TKM)	0	0	1	1
Totals (19 entries)		14	14	28	56

== Prize money ==
The sums written are per medalist, bringing the total prizes awarded to $154,000. (retrieved from:)

Medal	Total	Judoka	Coach
Gold	$5,000	$4,000	$1,000
Silver	$3,000	$2,400	$600
Bronze	$1,500	$1,200	$300
