= 2026 World Judo Championships – Mixed team =

Judo competition

Judo Mixed team at the 2026 World Judo Championships
- Venue: National Gymnastics Arena
- Location: Baku, Azerbaijan
- Date: 11 October 2026
- Competitors: 191 from 18 nations
- Total prize money: €200,000

Medalists
gold medal	Mao Arai; Rin Maeda; Sanshiro Murao; Yuta Nakamura; Kanta Nakano; Akari Omori; Akira Sone; Goki Tajima; Momo Tamaoki; Ryuga Tanaka; Shiho Tanaka; Shusuke Uchimura	Japan
silver medal	Egor Andoni; Tamerlan Bashaev; Murad Chopanov; Natalia Elkina; Tamara Lishchenko; Mansur Lorsanov; Daria Rechkalova; Buian-Kherel Sanaa; Elis Startseva; Madina Taimazova; Inal Tasoev; Irina Zueva	Russia
bronze medal	Shakhram Ahadov; Shukurjon Aminova; Umar Bozorov; Iriskhon Kurbanbaeva; Nurbek Murtozoev; Umida Nigmatova; Khurshida Razzokberdieva; Ernazar Sarsenbaev; Muzaffarbek Turoboyev; Shirinjon Yuldoshova	Uzbekistan
bronze medal	Lasha Bekauri; Irakli Demetrashvili; Nino Gulbani; Eteri Liparteliani; Giorgi Loladze; Nino Loladze; Luka Maisuradze; Lasha Shavdatuashvili; Sophio Somkhishvili; Mariam Tchanturia; Guram Tushishvili	Georgia

Champions
- Mixed team: Japan (8th title)

Competition at external databases
- Links: IJF • JudoInside

The mixed team event at the 2026 World Judo Championships was held at the National Gymnastics Arena in Baku, Azerbaijan on 11 October 2026.

== Participants ==
18 Nations will participate in the 2026 Mixed Team Judo Championships. The selected Judoka are:

Teams	Men			Women		
Teams	‍–‍73 kg	‍–‍90 kg	+90 kg	‍–‍57 kg	‍–‍70 kg	+70 kg
Austria	Firas Ben Saad	Thomas Scharfetter	Movli Borchashvilli	Laura Kallinger	Michaela Polleres	Elena Dengg; Maria Höllwart
Azerbaijan	Rashid Mammadaliyev; Ruslan Pashayev	Suleyman Shukurov; Zelim Tckaev	Ushangi Kokauri; Zelym Kotsoiev	Khadizha Gadashova; Gultaj Mammadaliyeva	Sudaba Aghayeva; Hanna Zaitseva	Madina Kaisinova
Brazil	Daniel Cargnin; Guilherme de Oliveira	Rafael Macedo; Guilherme Schimidt	Giovani Ferreira; Leonardo Gonçalves	Jéssica Lima; Sarah Souza	Nauana Silva; Rafaela Silva	Beatriz Souza; Thauana Silva
Cuba	Jonathan Charon; Orlando Polanco	Amado Montes	Iván Felipe Silva Morales	Lian Benavides	Maylín del Toro	Lianet Cardona; Dayanara Curbelo
China	Xue Ziyang; Zhang Minghao	Bu Hebilige	Huang Fuchun; Li Haiyang	Hui Xinran; Wang Nan	Feng Yingying; Liu Lu	Ayiman Jinesinuer; Niu Xinran
France	Dayyan Boulemtafes; Maxime Gobert	Tizie Gnamien; Aleksa Mitrovic	Tieman Diaby; Yann Rigaud	Shirine Boukli; Martha Fawaz	Clémence Eme; Manon Deketer	Romane Dicko; Léa Fontaine
Georgia	Giorgi Loladze; Lasha Shavdatuashvili	Lasha Bekauri; Luka Maisuradze	Irakli Demetrashvili; Guram Tushishvili	Eteri Liparteliani; Nino Loladze	Nino Gulbani	Sophio Somkhishvili; Mariam Tchanturia
Germany	Kevin Abeltshauser	Paul Friedrichs; Eduard Trippel	Losseni Kone; Mortaza Suha	Mascha Ballhaus; Seija Ballhaus	Miriam Butkereit; Giovanna Scoccimarro	Alina Böhm; Anna Monta Olek
Italy	Giovanni Esposito; Leonardo Valeriani	Kenny Komi Bedel; Manuel Parlati	Kwadjo Anani; Gennaro Pirelli	Giulia Carnà; Michela Terranova	Irene Pedrotti; Giorgia Stangherlin	Erica Simonetti; Asya Tavano
Japan	Ryuga Tanaka; Shusuke Uchimura	Sanshiro Murao; Goki Tajima	Kanta Nakano; Yuta Nakamura	Akari Omori; Momo Tamaoki	Rin Maeda; Shiho Tanaka	Mao Arai; Akira Sone
Kazakhstan	Yersultan Duisenkhan; Yeset Kuanov	Yermakhan Anuarbekov; Daniil Krylov	Zhantilek Nurtilepuly	Dana Abdirova; Dina Mukhanbet	Azhar Askhat; Moldir Narynova	Kamila Berlikash; Akerke Ramazanova
Kyrgyzstan	Yryskeldi Dzhumabekov; Ruslan Sabyrov	Erzhan Kanatbekov; Daniiar Melisov	Daut Poltushev; Emirkhan Zholdoshkaziev	Zhanar Zholdosheva	Myrzaiym Duishonbekova; Adina Kochkonbaeva	Aidemi Kalyeva
Mongolia	Odgereliin Uranbayar	Oyunchimegiin Shinebayar	Batkhuyagiin Gonchigsüren; Odkhüügiin Tsetsentsengel	Lkhagvasürengiin Sosorbaram; Terbishiin Ariunzayaa	Boldyn Gankhaich; Lkhagvatogoogiin Enkhriilen	Amarsaikhany Adiyaasüren; Dambadarjaagiin Nominzul
Russia	Murad Chopanov; Buian-Kherel Sanaa	Egor Andoni; Mansur Lorsanov	Tamerlan Bashaev; Inal Tasoev	Natalia Elkina; Irina Zueva	Tamara Lishchenko; Madina Taimazova	Daria Rechkalova; Elis Startseva
South Korea	An Jae-hong	Kim Jong-hoon; Song Min-ki	Kim Min-jong; Lee Seung-yeob	Hwang Sur-yeon; Kim Ju-hee	Kim Ye-ji; Lee Ye-rang	Lee Hyeon-ji; Lee Jeong-yun
Turkey	Bilal Çiloğlu; İbrahim Demirel	Vedat Albayrak; Erman Gürgen	Münir Ertuğ; İbrahim Tataroğlu	Ayşenur Budak; Fidan Ögel	Özlem Yıldız	Tuana Gülenay; Hilal Öztürk
United Arab Emirates	Makhmadbek Makhmadbekov; Kazbek Naguchev	Gadzhimurad Omarov; Nugzar Tatalashvili	Dzhafar Kostoev; Magomedomar Magomedomarov	Bishreltiin Khorloodoi; Oyunchimeg Oyungerel	Mashbatyn Tsendbazar	Yelyzaveta Lytvynenko
Uzbekistan	Shakhram Ahadov	Umar Bozorov; Nurbek Murtozoev	Ernazar Sarsenbaev; Muzaffarbek Turoboyev	Shukurjon Aminova	Khurshida Razzokberdieva; Shirinjon Yuldoshova	Iriskhon Kurbanbaeva; Umida Nigmatova

== Results ==
=== Bracket ===
First round
Azerbaijan	4
Austria	0
Russia	4
United Arab Emirates	1

Round of 16
Brazil	3
China	4
Cuba	0
Turkey	4
Mongolia	4
Kyrgyzstan	0
Japan	4
Azerbaijan	1
Georgia	4
Italy	1
Uzbekistan	4
Germany	2
South Korea	0
Russia	4
Kazakhstan	1
France	4

Quarter-finals
China	4
Turkey	1
Mongolia	1
Japan	4
Georgia	3
Uzbekistan	4
Russia	4
France	3

Semi-finals
China	0
Japan	3
Uzbekistan	3
Russia	4

Final
Japan	4
Russia	1

=== Repechage ===
Repechage
Turkey	3
Mongolia	4
Georgia	4
France	3

Third place
Mongolia	2
Uzbekistan	4
Georgia	4
China	1

== Matches ==
=== First round ===
==== Azerbaijan vs Austria ====
Weight Class	Azerbaijan	Result	Austria	Score
Women +70 kg	Madina Kaisinova	001 – 000	Maria Höllwart	1 – 0
Men +90 kg	Zelym Kotsoiev	101 – 000 (yellow card)	Movli Borchashvilli	2 – 0
Women –57 kg	Khadizha Gadashova	001 (yellow card) – 000	Laura Kallinger	3 – 0
Men –73 kg	Rashid Mammadaliyev	010 – 000 (yellow card)	Firas Ben Saad	4 – 0
Women –70 kg	Sudaba Aghayeva	—	Michaela Polleres	—
Men –90 kg	Zelim Tckaev	—	Thomas Scharfetter	—

==== Russian Federation vs United Arab Emirates ====
Weight Class	Russia	Result	United Arab Emirates	Score
Women +70 kg	Elis Startseva	100 (yellow card) – 000	Yelyzaveta Lytvynenko	1 – 0
Men +90 kg	Inal Tasoev	001 – 000	Magomedomar Magomedomarov	2 – 0
Women –57 kg	Irina Zueva	001 (yellow card) – 000	Bishreltiin Khorloodoi	3 – 0
Men –73 kg	Murad Chopanov	000 – 001 (yellow card)	Kazbek Naguchev	3 – 1
Women –70 kg	Madina Taimazova	101 – 000	Mashbatyn Tsendbazar	4 – 1
Men –90 kg	Mansur Lorsanov	—	Gadzhimurad Omarov	—

=== Round of 16 ===
==== Brazil vs People's Republic of China ====
Weight Class	Brazil	Result	China	Score
Men +90 kg	Leonardo Gonçalves	000 – 100	Huang Fuchun	0 – 1
Women –57 kg	Sarah Souza	002 – 001	Wang Nan	1 – 1
Men –73 kg	Guilherme de Oliveira	101 – 000	Zhang Minghao	2 – 1
Women –70 kg	Nauana Silva	000 – 100	Liu Lu	2 – 2
Men –90 kg	Rafael Macedo	101 (yellow card) – 000 (yellow card)	Bu Hebilige	3 – 2
Women +70 kg	Beatriz Souza	000 – 100	Niu Xinran	3 – 3
Men +90 kg	Leonardo Gonçalves	000 (yellow card) – 001	Huang Fuchun	3 – 4

==== Cuba vs Türkiye ====
Weight Class	Cuba	Result	Turkey	Score
Men +90 kg	Iván Felipe Silva Morales	000 (yellow card) – 010	İbrahim Tataroğlu	0 – 1
Women –57 kg	Lian Benavides	000 – 021	Ayşenur Budak	0 – 2
Men –73 kg	Orlando Polanco	000 – 101 (yellow card)	Bilal Çiloğlu	0 – 3
Women –70 kg	Maylín del Toro	000 – 002 (yellow card)	Fidan Ögel	0 – 4
Men –90 kg	Amado Montes	—	Vedat Albayrak	—
Women +70 kg	Dayanara Curbelo	—	Hilal Öztürk	—

==== Mongolia vs Kyrgyzstan ====
Weight Class	Mongolia	Result	Kyrgyzstan	Score
Men +90 kg	Batkhuyagiin Gonchigsüren	022 (yellow card) – 000	Daut Poltushev	1 – 0
Women –57 kg	Terbishiin Ariunzayaa	012 (yellow card) – 000	Zhanar Zholdosheva	2 – 0
Men –73 kg	Odgereliin Uranbayar	100 – 000	Yryskeldi Dzhumabekov	3 – 0
Women –70 kg	Lkhagvatogoogiin Enkhriilen	101 – 001	Myrzaiym Duishonbekova	4 – 0
Men –90 kg	Oyunchimegiin Shinebayar	—	Erzhan Kanatbekov	—
Women +70 kg	Amarsaikhany Adiyaasüren	—	Aidemi Kalyeva	—

==== Japan vs Azerbaijan ====
Weight Class	Japan	Result	Azerbaijan	Score
Men +90 kg	Kanta Nakano	000 (yellow card) – 100 (yellow card)	Zelym Kotsoiev	0 – 1
Women –57 kg	Momo Tamaoki	100 – 000 (yellow card)	Khadizha Gadashova	1 – 1
Men –73 kg	Ryuga Tanaka	002 (yellow card) – 000 (yellow card)	Rashid Mammadaliyev	2 – 1
Women –70 kg	Shiho Tanaka	001 – 000 (yellow card)	Sudaba Aghayeva	3 – 1
Men –90 kg	Goki Tajima	010 – 000	Zelim Tckaev	4 – 1
Women +70 kg	Mao Arai	—	Madina Kaisinova	—

==== Georgia vs Italy ====
Weight Class	Georgia	Result	Italy	Score
Men +90 kg	Irakli Demetrashvili	100 (yellow card) – 000	Kwadjo Anani	1 – 0
Women –57 kg	Eteri Liparteliani	100 (yellow card) – 000	Giulia Carnà	2 – 0
Men –73 kg	Giorgi Loladze	001 (yellow card) – 000	Giovanni Esposito	3 – 0
Women –70 kg	Nino Gulbani	001 – 100	Irene Pedrotti	3 – 1
Men –90 kg	Luka Maisuradze	001 – 000	Kenny Komi Bedel	4 – 1
Women +70 kg	Sophio Somkhishvili	—	Asya Tavano	—

==== Uzbekistan vs Germany ====
Weight Class	Uzbekistan	Result	Germany	Score
Men +90 kg	Muzaffarbek Turoboyev	100 – 001	Losseni Kone	1 – 0
Women –57 kg	Shukurjon Aminova	010 (yellow card) – 001	Mascha Ballhaus	2 – 0
Men –73 kg	Shakhram Ahadov	020 (yellow card) – 000	Kevin Abeltshauser	3 – 0
Women –70 kg	Shirinjon Yuldoshova	001 – 100	Miriam Butkereit	3 – 1
Men –90 kg	Umar Bozorov	000 – 021 (yellow card)	Paul Friedrichs	3 – 2
Women +70 kg	Umida Nigmatova	100 – 000	Anna Monta Olek	4 – 2

==== Republic of Korea vs Russian Federation ====
Weight Class	South Korea	Result	Russia	Score
Men +90 kg	Lee Seung-yeob	000 – 001 (yellow card)	Tamerlan Bashaev	0 – 1
Women –57 kg	Kim Ju-hee	000 – 100 (yellow card)	Irina Zueva	0 – 2
Men –73 kg	An Jae-hong	000 – 100	Buian-Kherel Sanaa	0 – 3
Women –70 kg	Lee Ye-rang	000 – 011 (yellow card)	Madina Taimazova	0 – 4
Men –90 kg	Kim Jong-hoon	—	Egor Andoni	—
Women +70 kg	Lee Hyeon-ji	—	Daria Rechkalova	—

==== Kazakhstan vs France ====
Weight Class	Kazakhstan	Result	France	Score
Men +90 kg	Zhantilek Nurtilepuly	100 – 000 (yellow card)	Tieman Diaby	1 – 0
Women –57 kg	Dina Mukhanbet	000 – 001	Martha Fawaz	1 – 1
Men –73 kg	Yersultan Duisenkhan	000 – 100	Dayyan Boulemtafes	1 – 2
Women –70 kg	Moldir Narynova	000 (yellow card) – 020	Clémence Eme	1 – 3
Men –90 kg	Yermakhan Anuarbekov	000 – 100	Aleksa Mitrovic	1 – 4
Women +70 kg	Akerke Ramazanova	—	Léa Fontaine	—

=== Quarter-finals ===
==== People's Republic of China vs Türkiye ====
Weight Class	China	Result	Turkey	Score
Women –57 kg	Wang Nan	001 – 000	Ayşenur Budak	1 – 0
Men –73 kg	Zhang Minghao	000 – 100	İbrahim Demirel	1 – 1
Women –70 kg	Liu Lu	101 – 000	Fidan Ögel	2 – 1
Men –90 kg	Bu Hebilige	100 – 000	Vedat Albayrak	3 – 1
Women +70 kg	Niu Xinran	100 – 000	Hilal Öztürk	4 – 1
Men +90 kg	Li Haiyang	—	İbrahim Tataroğlu	—

==== Mongolia vs Japan ====
Weight Class	Mongolia	Result	Japan	Score
Women –57 kg	Terbishiin Ariunzayaa	000 – 001	Akari Omori	0 – 1
Men –73 kg	Odgereliin Uranbayar	011 – 100	Shusuke Uchimura	0 – 2
Women –70 kg	Lkhagvatogoogiin Enkhriilen	100 – 000	Rin Maeda	1 – 2
Men –90 kg	Oyunchimegiin Shinebayar	000 – 020	Goki Tajima	1 – 3
Women +70 kg	Amarsaikhany Adiyaasüren	000 – 100	Mao Arai	1 – 4
Men +90 kg	Batkhuyagiin Gonchigsüren	—	Yuta Nakamura	—

==== Georgia vs Uzbekistan ====
Weight Class	Georgia	Result	Uzbekistan	Score
Women –57 kg	Eteri Liparteliani	002 (yellow card) – 000	Shukurjon Aminova	1 – 0
Men –73 kg	Giorgi Loladze	000 (yellow card) – 001 (yellow card)	Shakhram Ahadov	1 – 1
Women –70 kg	Nino Gulbani	100 (yellow card) – 000 (yellow card)	Shirinjon Yuldoshova	2 – 1
Men –90 kg	Lasha Bekauri	020 – 000	Nurbek Murtozoev	3 – 1
Women +70 kg	Sophio Somkhishvili	000 – 111	Umida Nigmatova	3 – 2
Men +90 kg	Irakli Demetrashvili	000 – 010	Muzaffarbek Turoboyev	3 – 3
Women +70 kg	Sophio Somkhishvili	000 – 001	Umida Nigmatova	3 – 4

==== Russian Federation vs France ====
Weight Class	Russia	Result	France	Score
Women –57 kg	Irina Zueva	100 – 000	Martha Fawaz	1 – 0
Men –73 kg	Murad Chopanov	001 – 011	Dayyan Boulemtafes	1 – 1
Women –70 kg	Madina Taimazova	000 (yellow card) – 003	Clémence Eme	1 – 2
Men –90 kg	Mansur Lorsanov	101 (yellow card) – 000	Aleksa Mitrovic	2 – 2
Women +70 kg	Elis Startseva	000 (yellow card) – 101 (yellow card)	Romane Dicko	2 – 3
Men +90 kg	Tamerlan Bashaev	001 – 000 (yellow card)	Tieman Diaby	3 – 3
Men –90 kg	Mansur Lorsanov	001 (yellow card) – 000	Aleksa Mitrovic	4 – 3

=== Repechages ===
==== Türkiye vs Mongolia ====
Weight Class	Turkey	Result	Mongolia	Score
Men –73 kg	Bilal Çiloğlu	100 (yellow card) – 000	Odgereliin Uranbayar	1 – 0
Women –70 kg	Özlem Yıldız	000 (yellow card) – 001 (yellow card)	Boldyn Gankhaich	1 – 1
Men –90 kg	Vedat Albayrak	002 (yellow card) – 000 (yellow card)	Oyunchimegiin Shinebayar	2 – 1
Women +70 kg	Tuana Gülenay	000 – 100	Amarsaikhany Adiyaasüren	2 – 2
Men +90 kg	İbrahim Tataroğlu	000 – 001	Batkhuyagiin Gonchigsüren	2 – 3
Women –57 kg	Ayşenur Budak	101 – 000	Terbishiin Ariunzayaa	3 – 3
Women –70 kg	Özlem Yıldız	000 – 010 (yellow card)	Boldyn Gankhaich	3 – 4

==== Georgia vs France ====
Weight Class	Georgia	Result	France	Score
Men –73 kg	Giorgi Loladze	000 (yellow card) – 010	Dayyan Boulemtafes	0 – 1
Women –70 kg	Nino Gulbani	000 (yellow card) – 002 (yellow card)	Clémence Eme	0 – 2
Men –90 kg	Lasha Bekauri	110 (yellow card) – 010	Aleksa Mitrovic	1 – 2
Women +70 kg	Sophio Somkhishvili	000 – 100	Léa Fontaine	1 – 3
Men +90 kg	Irakli Demetrashvili	100 – 000	Tieman Diaby	2 – 3
Women –57 kg	Eteri Liparteliani	100 – 000	Martha Fawaz	3 – 3
Men –90 kg	Lasha Bekauri	010 – 000 (yellow card)	Aleksa Mitrovic	4 – 3

=== Semi-finals ===
==== People's Republic of China vs Japan ====
Weight Class	China	Result	Japan	Score
Men –73 kg	Zhang Minghao	000 – 100	Shusuke Uchimura	0 – 1
Women –70 kg	Liu Lu	000 – 000	Shiho Tanaka	0 – 1
Men –90 kg	Bu Hebilige	000 – 100	Sanshiro Murao	0 – 2
Women +70 kg	Niu Xinran	000 – 100	Mao Arai	0 – 3
Men +90 kg	Li Haiyang	—	Yuta Nakamura	—
Women –57 kg	Wang Nan	—	Momo Tamaoki	—

==== Uzbekistan vs Russian Federation ====
Weight Class	Uzbekistan	Result	Russia	Score
Men –73 kg	Shakhram Ahadov	100 (yellow card) – 000 (yellow card)	Buian-Kherel Sanaa	1 – 0
Women –70 kg	Shirinjon Yuldoshova	000 (yellow card) – 001	Tamara Lishchenko	1 – 1
Men –90 kg	Nurbek Murtozoev	010 – 000	Mansur Lorsanov	2 – 1
Women +70 kg	Umida Nigmatova	000 – 101	Daria Rechkalova	2 – 2
Men +90 kg	Muzaffarbek Turoboyev	010 – 110	Inal Tasoev	2 – 3
Women –57 kg	Shukurjon Aminova	001 (yellow card) – 000 (yellow card)	Natalia Elkina	3 – 3
Men +90 kg	Muzaffarbek Turoboyev	000 – 100	Inal Tasoev	3 – 4

=== Bronze medal matches ===
==== Mongolia vs Uzbekistan ====
Weight Class	Mongolia	Result	Uzbekistan	Score
Women –70 kg	Lkhagvatogoogiin Enkhriilen	000 (yellow card) – 001 (yellow card)	Shirinjon Yuldoshova	0 – 1
Men –90 kg	Oyunchimegiin Shinebayar	000 – 100	Nurbek Murtozoev	0 – 2
Women +70 kg	Amarsaikhany Adiyaasüren	100 (yellow card) – 000	Iriskhon Kurbanbaeva	1 – 2
Men +90 kg	Batkhuyagiin Gonchigsüren	000 (yellow card) – 001 (yellow card)	Muzaffarbek Turoboyev	1 – 3
Women –57 kg	Lkhagvasürengiin Sosorbaram	100 – 000	Shukurjon Aminova	2 – 3
Men –73 kg	Odgereliin Uranbayar	000 (yellow card) – 001	Shakhram Ahadov	2 – 4

==== Georgia vs People's Republic of China ====
Weight Class	Georgia	Result	China	Score
Women –70 kg	Nino Gulbani	100 (yellow card) – 000	Liu Lu	1 – 0
Men –90 kg	Luka Maisuradze	101 – 000	Bu Hebilige	2 – 0
Women +70 kg	-none Women +70 kg-	– w/o	Niu Xinran	2 – 1
Men +90 kg	Irakli Demetrashvili	100 (yellow card) – 000 (yellow card)	Huang Fuchun	3 – 1
Women –57 kg	Eteri Liparteliani	011 (yellow card) – 001 (yellow card)	Wang Nan	4 – 1
Men –73 kg	Giorgi Loladze	—	Zhang Minghao	—

=== Gold medal match - Japan vs Russian Federation ===
Weight Class	Japan	Result	Russia	Score
Women –70 kg	Shiho Tanaka	001 – 000 (yellow card)	Madina Taimazova	1 – 0
Men –90 kg	Sanshiro Murao	002 – 000	Egor Andoni	2 – 0
Women +70 kg	Mao Arai	001 – 000 (yellow card)	Daria Rechkalova	3 – 0
Men +90 kg	Kanta Nakano	000 – 001	Tamerlan Bashaev	3 – 1
Women –57 kg	Akari Omori	011 (yellow card) – 000	Irina Zueva	4 – 1
Men –73 kg	Ryuga Tanaka	—	Buian-Kherel Sanaa	—

== Prize money ==
The sums listed bring the total prizes awarded to €200,000 for the event.

Medal	Total	Judoka	Coach
Gold	€90,000	€72,000	€18,000
Silver	€60,000	€48,000	€12,000
Bronze	€25,000	€20,000	€5,000
