= 2022 World Judo Championships – Women's 63 kg =

Judo competition

Judo Women's 63 kg at the 2022 World Judo Championships
- Venue: Humo Ice Dome
- Location: Tashkent, Uzbekistan
- Date: 9 October
- Competitors: 41 from 35 nations
- Total prize money: €57,000

Medalists
gold medal	Megumi Horikawa (1st title)	Japan
silver medal	Catherine Beauchemin-Pinard	Canada
bronze medal	Manon Deketer	France
bronze medal	Bárbara Timo	Portugal

Competition at external databases
- Links: IJF • JudoInside

The Women's 63 kg event at the 2022 World Judo Championships was held at the Humo Ice Dome arena in Tashkent, Uzbekistan on 9 October 2022.

== Results ==
=== Finals ===
Semi-finals
(Japan) Megumi Horikawa	10
(Portugal) Bárbara Timo	00
(Canada) Catherine Beauchemin-Pinard	10
(France) Manon Deketer	00

Final
(Japan) Megumi Horikawa	10
(Canada) Catherine Beauchemin-Pinard	00

=== Repechage ===
Repechage
(United Kingdom) Lucy Renshall	00
(Poland) Angelika Szymańska	10
(Czech Republic) Renata Zachová	00
(Romania) Florentina Ivănescu	01

Bronze medal
(Poland) Angelika Szymańska	00
(France) Manon Deketer	01
(Romania) Florentina Ivănescu	00
(Portugal) Bárbara Timo	01

=== Pool A ===
First round
(Spain) Cristina Cabaña	00
(Algeria) Amina Belkadi	01
(Mongolia) Boldyn Gankhaich	00
(Israel) Kerem Primo	10

Round of 32
(United Kingdom) Lucy Renshall	10
(Algeria) Amina Belkadi	00
(Israel) Kerem Primo	10
(Kazakhstan) Esmigul Kuyulova	00
(Australia) Katharina Haecker	10
(Ukraine) Anastasiia Antipina	00
(Japan) Megumi Horikawa	10
(Italy) Nicolle D'Isanto	00

Round of 16
(United Kingdom) Lucy Renshall	10
(Israel) Kerem Primo	00
(Australia) Katharina Haecker	00
(Japan) Megumi Horikawa	10

Quarter-finals
(United Kingdom) Lucy Renshall	00
(Japan) Megumi Horikawa	01

=== Pool B ===
First round
(Portugal) Bárbara Timo	11
(Serbia) Anja Obradović	00
(Cape Verde) Carolina Delgado	00
(United States) Sara Golden	10

Round of 32
(Slovenia) Andreja Leški	00
(Portugal) Bárbara Timo	01
(Netherlands) Geke van den Berg	11
(Senegal) Anna Faye	00
(Hungary) Szofi Özbas	10
(South Korea) Lee Ju-yeon	00
(Poland) Angelika Szymańska	10
(United States) Sara Golden	00

Round of 16
(Portugal) Bárbara Timo	01
(Netherlands) Geke van den Berg	00
(Hungary) Szofi Özbas	00
(Poland) Angelika Szymańska	10

Quarter-finals
(Portugal) Bárbara Timo	10
(Poland) Angelika Szymańska	00

=== Pool C ===
First round
(Cameroon) Audrey Etoua	10
(Kosovo) Laura Fazliu	00
(Spain) Sarai Padilla	10
(Cuba) Maylín del Toro Carvajal	00
(Germany) Nadja Bazynski	00
(Czech Republic) Renata Zachová	10

Round of 32
(Canada) Catherine Beauchemin-Pinard	10
(Cameroon) Audrey Etoua	00
(South Korea) Kim Ji-jeong	00
(Croatia) Iva Oberan	10
(Israel) Gili Sharir	10
(Spain) Sarai Padilla	00
(Czech Republic) Renata Zachová	10
(Turkmenistan) Zülhumar Daşkinowa	00

Round of 16
(Canada) Catherine Beauchemin-Pinard	10
(Croatia) Iva Oberan	00
(Israel) Gili Sharir	00
(Czech Republic) Renata Zachová	01

Quarter-finals
(Canada) Catherine Beauchemin-Pinard	10
(Czech Republic) Renata Zachová	00

=== Pool D ===
First round
(China) Tang Jing	10
(Dominican Republic) Ariela Sánchez	00
(Uzbekistan) Sevinch Isokova	10
(Kyrgyzstan) Azhar Isaeva	00

Round of 32
(Brazil) Ketleyn Quadros	10
(China) Tang Jing	00
(United States) Hannah Martin	00
(Romania) Florentina Ivănescu	10
(Netherlands) Sanne Vermeer	10
(Kazakhstan) Moldir Narynova	00
(Uzbekistan) Sevinch Isokova	00
(France) Manon Deketer	10

Round of 16
(Brazil) Ketleyn Quadros	00
(Romania) Florentina Ivănescu	10
(Netherlands) Sanne Vermeer	00
(France) Manon Deketer	10

Quarter-finals
(Romania) Florentina Ivănescu	00
(France) Manon Deketer	11
