= 2025 World Judo Championships – Women's 63 kg =

Judo competition

Judo Women's 63 kg at the 2025 World Judo Championships
- Venue: László Papp Budapest Sports Arena
- Location: Budapest, Hungary
- Date: 16 June 2025
- Competitors: 44 from 34 nations
- Total prize money: €57,000

Medalists
gold medal	Haruka Kaju (1st title)	Japan
silver medal	Catherine Beauchemin-Pinard	Canada
bronze medal	Boldyn Gankhaich	Mongolia
bronze medal	Laura Fazliu	Kosovo

Competition at external databases
- Links: IJF • JudoInside

The 2025 World Judo Championships was held at the László Papp Budapest Sports Arena in Budapest, Hungary on 16 June 2025.

== Results ==
=== Finals ===
Semi-finals
(Brazil) Nauana Silva	000 (yellow card)
(Japan) Haruka Kaju	100
(Canada) Catherine Beauchemin-Pinard	100 (yellow card)
(Brazil) Rafaela Silva	000

Final
(Japan) Haruka Kaju	001 (yellow card)
(Canada) Catherine Beauchemin-Pinard	000

=== Repechage ===
Repechage
(Hungary) Szabina Gercsák	000
(Mongolia) Boldyn Gankhaich	001 (yellow card)
(Mongolia) Lkhagvatogoogiin Enkhriilen
(Kosovo) Laura Fazliu	w/o

Bronze medal
(Mongolia) Boldyn Gankhaich	010
(Brazil) Rafaela Silva	000
(Kosovo) Laura Fazliu	100
(Brazil) Nauana Silva	000 (yellow card)

=== Pool A ===
First round
(North Korea) Kim Ji-hye	010
(Spain) Laura Vázquez	000
(Italy) Savita Russo	000 (yellow card)
(Germany) Friederike Stolze	020 (yellow card)
(Hungary) Szabina Gercsák	020 (yellow card)
(Uzbekistan) Marjona Nurulloeva	000

Round of 32
(Netherlands) Joanne van Lieshout	001
(Australia) Katharina Haecker	000
(North Korea) Kim Ji-hye	000 (yellow card)
(Brazil) Nauana Silva	001 (yellow card)
(Poland) Angelika Szymańska	001
(Germany) Friederike Stolze	002 (yellow card)
(Hungary) Szabina Gercsák	022
(Kyrgyzstan) Adina Kochkonbaeva	000

Round of 16
(Netherlands) Joanne van Lieshout	000 (yellow card)
(Brazil) Nauana Silva	010 (yellow card)
(Germany) Friederike Stolze	000
(Hungary) Szabina Gercsák	001

Quarter-finals
(Brazil) Nauana Silva	010
(Hungary) Szabina Gercsák	000 (yellow card)

=== Pool B ===
First round
(Chinese Taipei) Yuan Pei-chun	000
(International Judo Federation) Dali Liluashvili	011 (yellow card)
(Czech Republic) Renata Zachová	000
(South Korea) Shin Chae-won	100
(China) Tang Jing	101 (yellow card)
(Georgia (country)) Eter Askilashvili	000

Round of 32
(Austria) Lubjana Piovesana	001 (yellow card)
(International Judo Federation) Dali Liluashvili	000 (yellow card)
(South Korea) Shin Chae-won	000
(Mongolia) Boldyn Gankhaich	100
(Croatia) Iva Oberan	100
(South Africa) Skye Knoester	000 (yellow card)
(China) Tang Jing	000
(Japan) Haruka Kaju	100

Round of 16
(Austria) Lubjana Piovesana	000
(Mongolia) Boldyn Gankhaich	001
(Croatia) Iva Oberan	000
(Japan) Haruka Kaju	100

Quarter-finals
(Mongolia) Boldyn Gankhaich	000
(Japan) Haruka Kaju	001

=== Pool C ===
First round
(Turkmenistan) Zülhumar Daşkinowa	000
(South Africa) Jasmine Martin	100 (yellow card)
(Slovenia) Kaja Kajzer	001
(Kazakhstan) Esmigul Kuyulova	000
(Croatia) Katarina Krišto	020
(Cuba) Maylín del Toro	000

Round of 32
(Canada) Catherine Beauchemin-Pinard	100
(South Africa) Jasmine Martin	000 (yellow card)
(Slovenia) Kaja Kajzer	001
(Czech Republic) Anna Skalská	000 (yellow card)
(France) Melkia Auchecorne	101
(Venezuela) Anriquelis Barrios	000
(Croatia) Katarina Krišto	000
(Mongolia) Lkhagvatogoogiin Enkhriilen	010 (yellow card)

Round of 16
(Canada) Catherine Beauchemin-Pinard	001
(Slovenia) Kaja Kajzer	000 (yellow card)
(France) Melkia Auchecorne	000 (yellow card)
(Mongolia) Lkhagvatogoogiin Enkhriilen	011

Quarter-finals
(Canada) Catherine Beauchemin-Pinard	100
(Mongolia) Lkhagvatogoogiin Enkhriilen	001 (yellow card)

=== Pool D ===
First round
(India) Himanshi Tokas	001
(Poland) Natalia Kropska	111 (yellow card)
(Brazil) Rafaela Silva	001
(Spain) Cristina Cabaña	000 (yellow card)
(Hungary) Brigitta Varga	001 (yellow card)
(Colombia) Cindy Mera	020 (yellow card)

Round of 32
(Kosovo) Laura Fazliu	100 (yellow card)
(Poland) Natalia Kropska	000 (yellow card)
(Romania) Amanda Zuaznabar-Torres	000
(Italy) Carlotta Avanzato	001
(France) Manon Deketer	000
(Brazil) Rafaela Silva	100
(Colombia) Cindy Mera	w/o
~~(Israel) Inbal Shemesh~~

Round of 16
(Kosovo) Laura Fazliu	100 (yellow card)
(Italy) Carlotta Avanzato	000 (yellow card)
(Brazil) Rafaela Silva	100 (yellow card)
(Colombia) Cindy Mera	010

Quarter-finals
(Kosovo) Laura Fazliu	000
(Brazil) Rafaela Silva	100

== Prize money ==
The sums listed bring the total prizes awarded to €57,000 for the individual event.

Medal	Total	Judoka	Coach
Gold	€26,000	€20,800	€5,200
Silver	€15,000	€12,000	€3,000
Bronze	€8,000	€6,400	€1,600
