= 2026 World Judo Championships – Women's 63 kg =

Judo competition

Judo Women's 63 kg at the 2026 World Judo Championships
- Venue: National Gymnastics Arena
- Location: Baku, Azerbaijan
- Date: 7 October 2026
- Competitors: 48 from 38 nations
- Total prize money: €57,000

Medalists
gold medal	Haruka Kaju (2nd title)	Japan
silver medal	Kerem Primo	Israel
bronze medal	Renata Zachová	Czech Republic
bronze medal	Lkhagvatogoogiin Enkhriilen	Mongolia

Competition at external databases
- Links: IJF

The women's 63 kg event at the 2026 World Judo Championships was held at the National Gymnastics Arena in Baku, Azerbaijan on 7 October 2026.

== Results ==
=== Finals ===
Semi-finals
(Japan) Haruka Kaju	102
(Netherlands) Joanne van Lieshout	000
(Israel) Kerem Primo	101
(Hungary) Anna Kriza	000

Final
(Japan) Haruka Kaju	102
(Israel) Kerem Primo	000

=== Repechage ===
Repechage
(Mongolia) Boldyn Gankhaich	000
(Czech Republic) Renata Zachová	001
(Mongolia) Lkhagvatogoogiin Enkhriilen	001 (yellow card)
(France) Clarisse Agbegnenou	000

Bronze medal
(Czech Republic) Renata Zachová	021 (yellow card)
(Hungary) Anna Kriza	011 (yellow card)
(Mongolia) Lkhagvatogoogiin Enkhriilen	001 (yellow card)
(Netherlands) Joanne van Lieshout	000

=== Pool A ===
First round
(Finland) Louna-Lumia Seikkula	000
(Canada) Jessica Klimkait	101
(Australia) Saya Middleton	000
(Portugal) Joana Crisóstomo	110
(Germany) Friederike Stolze	100
Melika Balali	000
(Cuba) Maylín del Toro	000 (yellow card)
(Croatia) Nina Simić	010 (yellow card)

Round of 32
(Japan) Haruka Kaju	100 (yellow card)
(Canada) Jessica Klimkait	000
(Portugal) Joana Crisóstomo	020
(Belarus) Yana Makretskaya	000
(Mongolia) Boldyn Gankhaich	001
(Germany) Friederike Stolze	000 (yellow card)
(Croatia) Nina Simić	100
(Turkey) Özlem Yıldız	000

Round of 16
(Japan) Haruka Kaju	100
(Portugal) Joana Crisóstomo	000
(Mongolia) Boldyn Gankhaich	002
(Croatia) Nina Simić	001

Quarter-finals
(Japan) Haruka Kaju	101
(Mongolia) Boldyn Gankhaich	000

=== Pool B ===
First round
(South Korea) Kim Ye-ji	000
(Austria) Lubjana Piovesana	100
(Niger) Rahina Modi Moumouni	000 (yellow card)
(Poland) Natalia Kropska	101
(Venezuela) Anriquelis Barrios	000
(Russia) Dali Liluashvili	001
(Liechtenstein) Lea Wyss	000
(Czech Republic) Renata Zachová	111

Round of 32
(Netherlands) Joanne van Lieshout	020 (yellow card)
(Austria) Lubjana Piovesana	001
(Poland) Natalia Kropska	100
(United States) Karlee Carrouth	010
(France) Manon Deketer	100 (yellow card)
(Russia) Dali Liluashvili	000
(Czech Republic) Renata Zachová	101 (yellow card)
(Spain) Laura Vázquez	000 (yellow card)

Round of 16
(Netherlands) Joanne van Lieshout	100
(Poland) Natalia Kropska	000
(France) Manon Deketer	000 (yellow card)
(Czech Republic) Renata Zachová	100

Quarter-finals
(Netherlands) Joanne van Lieshout	001 (yellow card)
(Czech Republic) Renata Zachová	000 (yellow card)

=== Pool C ===
First round
(Spain) Ariela Sánchez	020
(Algeria) Yassamine Djellab	000
(Germany) Sara-Joy Bauer	110
(South Africa) Skye Knoester	000
(Israel) Kerem Primo	110 (yellow card)
(Italy) Carlotta Avanzato	000
(United States) Emily Daniela Jaspe	000 (yellow card)
(India) Himanshi Tokas	100

Round of 32
(Mongolia) Lkhagvatogoogiin Enkhriilen	011
(Spain) Ariela Sánchez	000 (yellow card)
(Germany) Sara-Joy Bauer	000
(Kosovo) Laura Fazliu	012
(Poland) Angelika Szymańska	011
(Israel) Kerem Primo	100 (yellow card)
(India) Himanshi Tokas	000
(Australia) Maeve Coughlan	100

Round of 16
(Mongolia) Lkhagvatogoogiin Enkhriilen	100
(Kosovo) Laura Fazliu	000
(Israel) Kerem Primo	001
(Australia) Maeve Coughlan	000 (yellow card)

Quarter-finals
(Mongolia) Lkhagvatogoogiin Enkhriilen	000 (yellow card)
(Israel) Kerem Primo	010

=== Pool D ===
First round
(Canada) Catherine Beauchemin-Pinard	101
(Bulgaria) Yoana Manova	001
(Slovenia) Kaja Kajzer Žabkar	101
(Kazakhstan) Esmigul Kuyulova	000
(South Korea) Kim Ji-su	020
(Kyrgyzstan) Adina Kochkonbaeva	000
(Chinese Taipei) Yuan Pei-chun	000 (yellow card)
(Hungary) Anna Kriza	100

Round of 32
(Brazil) Rafaela Silva	000 (yellow card)
(Canada) Catherine Beauchemin-Pinard	102
(Slovenia) Kaja Kajzer Žabkar	000 (yellow card)
(France) Clarisse Agbegnenou	101
(Croatia) Iva Oberan	100 (yellow card)
(South Korea) Kim Ji-su	000
(Hungary) Anna Kriza	101
(Azerbaijan) Hanna Zaitseva	000

Round of 16
(Canada) Catherine Beauchemin-Pinard	000
(France) Clarisse Agbegnenou	001
(Croatia) Iva Oberan	010 (yellow card)
(Hungary) Anna Kriza	011

Quarter-finals
(France) Clarisse Agbegnenou	001
(Hungary) Anna Kriza	011

== Prize money ==
The sums listed bring the total prizes awarded to €57,000 for the individual event.

Medal	Total	Judoka	Coach
Gold	€26,000	€20,800	€5,200
Silver	€15,000	€12,000	€3,000
Bronze	€8,000	€6,400	€1,600
