= Shusuke Uchimura =

Japanese judoka (born 2000)

Personal information
- Born: 6 April 2000 (age 26)
- Occupation: Judoka

Sport
- Country: Japan
- Sport: Judo
- Weight class: ‍–‍73 kg
Medal record
Men's judo
Representing Japan
World Championships
Gold medal – first place	2026 Baku	Mixed team
IJF Grand Slam
Bronze medal – third place	2024 Tokyo	‍–‍73 kg
Bronze medal – third place	2025 Tokyo	‍–‍73 kg
Bronze medal – third place	2026 Tashkent	‍–‍73 kg
Bronze medal – third place	2026 Budapest	‍–‍73 kg

Profile at external databases
- IJF: 87226
- JudoInside.com: 130468
- Updated on 12 October 2026

Shusuke Uchimura (内村秀資, Uchimura Shusuke; born 6 April 2000) is a Japanese judoka.

== Career ==
In December 2024, Uchimura competed at the 2024 Judo Grand Slam Tokyo and won a bronze medal in the –73 kg category, his first career Judo Grand Slam medal. He repeated as Judo Grand Slam Tokyo bronze medalist in 2025.

In March 2026, he competed at the 2026 Judo Grand Slam Tashkent and won a bronze medal in the –73 kg category. In September 2026, he competed at the 2026 Judo Grand Slam Budapest and again won a bronze medal in the –73 kg category. The next month he competed at the 2026 World Judo Championships and helped Japan win a gold medal in the mixed team event. This was Japan's eighth gold medal in the event at the World Judo Championships and first since 2024.
