= 2022 European Judo Championships – Women's 63 kg =

Judo Women's 63 kg at the 2022 European Judo Championships
- Venue: Armeets Arena
- Location: Sofia, Bulgaria
- Date: 30 April
- Competitors: 26 from 19 nations

Medalists
gold medal	Gemma Howell (1st title)	Great Britain
silver medal	Laura Fazliu	Kosovo
bronze medal	Szofi Özbas	Hungary
bronze medal	Gili Sharir	Israel

Competition at external databases
- Links: IJF • JudoInside

The women's 63 kg competition at the 2022 European Judo Championships was held on 30 April at the Armeets Arena.

== Results ==
=== Finals ===
Semi-finals
Laura Fazliu (KOS)	10
Cristina Cabaña (ESP)	00
Gemma Howell (GBR)	01
Szofi Özbas (HUN)	00

Final
Laura Fazliu (KOS)	00
Gemma Howell (GBR)	10

=== Repechage ===
Repechage
Renata Zachová (CZE)	11
Magdalena Krssakova (AUT)	01
Geke van den Berg (NED)	00
Gili Sharir (ISR)	01

Bronze medal
Renata Zachová (CZE)	00
Szofi Özbas (HUN)	01
Gili Sharir (ISR)	10
Cristina Cabaña (ESP)	00

=== Pool A ===
First round
Laura Fazliu (KOS)	10
Kerem Primo (ISR)	00
Renata Zachová (CZE)	01
Iva Oberan (CRO)	00
Ayten Yeksan (TUR)	01
Helene Christensen (DEN)	00

Round of 16
Lucy Renshall (GBR)	00
Laura Fazliu (KOS)	10
Renata Zachová (CZE)	10
Ayten Yeksan (TUR)	00

Quarterfinals
Laura Fazliu (KOS)	01
Renata Zachová (CZE)	00

=== Pool B ===
First round
Lia Ludvik (SLO)	00
Hedvig Karakas (HUN)	10
Joanne van Lieshout (NED)	00
Florentina Ivănescu (ROU)	01

Round of 16
Magdalena Krssakova (AUT)	01
Hedvig Karakas (HUN)	00
Cristina Cabaña (ESP)	01
Florentina Ivănescu (ROU)	00

Quarterfinals
Magdalena Krssakova (AUT)	00
Cristina Cabaña (ESP)	01

=== Pool C ===
First round
Gemma Howell (GBR)	11
Bárbara Timo (POR)	00
Geke van den Berg (NED)	10
Anastasiya Antipina (UKR)	00
Anja Obradović (SRB)	00
Sarai Padilla (ESP)	10

Round of 16
Andreja Leški (SLO)	00
Gemma Howell (GBR)	01
Geke van den Berg (NED)	10
Sarai Padilla (ESP)	00

Quarterfinals
Gemma Howell (GBR)	11
Geke van den Berg (NED)	00

=== Pool D ===
First round
Manon Deketer (FRA)	10
Katarina Krišto (CRO)	00
Gili Sharir (ISR)	10
Yoana Manova (BUL)	00

Round of 16
Szofi Özbas (HUN)	01
Manon Deketer (FRA)	00
Angelika Szymańska (POL)	00
Gili Sharir (ISR)	10

Quarterfinals
Szofi Özbas (HUN)	10
Gili Sharir (ISR)	00
