= Kurena Ikeda =

Japanese judoka (born 2002)

Personal information
- Born: 17 November 2002 (age 23)
- Occupation: Judoka

Sport
- Country: Japan
- Sport: Judo
- Weight class: ‍–‍78 kg

Achievements and titles
- World Champ.: (bronze) (2025, 2026)
- Asian Champ.: (gold) (2025)
Medal record
Women's judo
Representing Japan
World Championships
| Bronze medal – third place | 2025 Budapest | ‍–‍78 kg |
| Bronze medal – third place | 2026 Baku | ‍–‍78 kg |
Asian Championships
| Gold medal – first place | 2025 Bangkok | ‍–‍78 kg |
IJF Grand Slam
| Gold medal – first place | 2024 Tokyo | ‍–‍78 kg |
| Gold medal – first place | 2025 Tokyo | ‍–‍78 kg |
IJF Grand Prix
| Gold medal – first place | 2025 Guadalajara | ‍–‍78 kg |

Profile at external databases
- IJF: 68760
- JudoInside.com: 151247
- Updated on 10 October 2026

Kurena Ikeda (池田紅, Ikeda Kurena; born 17 November 2002) is a Japanese judoka.

== Career ==
In December 2024, Ikeda competed at the 2024 Judo Grand Slam Tokyo and won her first career Judo Grand Slam gold medal in the –78 kg category. She repeated as Judo Grand Slam Tokyo champion in 2025.

In April 2025, she competed at the 2025 Asian Judo Championships and won a gold medal in the –78 kg category. In June 2025, she competed at the 2025 World Judo Championships and won a bronze medal in the –78 kg category. She lost to Germany's Anna Monta Olek in the quarterfinals but fought her way through the repechage to finish third. In October 2025, she competed at the 2025 Judo Grand Prix Guadalajara and won a gold medal in the –78 kg category.

In October 2026, she competed at the 2026 World Judo Championships and won a bronze medal in the –78 kg category. She lost to France's Kaïla Issoufi in the quarterfinals but fought her way through the repechage to win a bronze medal for the second consecutive year.
