= Nauana Silva =

Brazilian judoka (born 2003)

Personal information
- Full name: Nauana Aparecida das Dores Lopes da Silva
- Born: 27 February 2003 (age 23)
- Occupation: Judoka

Sport
- Country: Brazil
- Sport: Judo
- Weight class: ‍–‍63 kg, ‍–‍70 kg

Achievements and titles
- World Champ.: 5th (2026)
- Pan American Champ.: (gold) (2025, 2026)
Medal record
Women's judo
Representing Brazil
Pan American Championships
Gold medal – first place	2025 Santiago	‍–‍63 kg
Gold medal – first place	2026 Panama City	‍–‍70 kg
Silver medal – second place	2024 Rio de Janeiro	‍–‍63 kg
IJF Grand Slam
Bronze medal – third place	2026 Astana	‍–‍70 kg
IJF Grand Prix
Gold medal – first place	2026 Zagreb	‍–‍70 kg
Silver medal – second place	2025 Lima	‍–‍63 kg
Silver medal – second place	2026 Lima	‍–‍70 kg
Bronze medal – third place	2024 Zagreb	‍–‍63 kg
Bronze medal – third place	2025 Guadalajara	‍–‍63 kg
South American Games
Gold medal – first place	2026 Rosario	‍–‍70 kg
Gold medal – first place	2026 Rosario	Mixed team
Junior Pan American Games
Bronze medal – third place	2021 Cali Valle	‍–‍63 kg
Pan American Junior Championships
Gold medal – first place	2023 Calgary	‍–‍63 kg
Bronze medal – third place	2021 Cali	‍–‍63 kg

Profile at external databases
- IJF: 64728
- JudoInside.com: 92065
- Updated on 15 November 2026

Nauana Aparecida das Dores Lopes da Silva (born 27 February 2003) is a Brazilian judoka. She is a Pan American Judo Championships gold medalist.

== Career ==
In April 2024, Silva competed at the 2024 Pan American-Oceania Judo Championships and won a silver medal in the –63 kg category. During the final she lost to Australia's Katharina Haecker. In September 2024, she competed at the 2024 Judo Grand Prix Zagreb and won a bronze medal in the –63 kg category, her first career IJF World Tour medal.

In April 2025, she competed at the 2025 Pan American-Oceania Judo Championships and won a gold medal in the –63 kg category. In June 2025, she competed at the 2025 World Judo Championships where she advanced to the semifinals in the –63 kg category, losing to Japan's Haruka Kaju. In the repechage, she lost to Kosovo's Laura Fazliu, and failed to medal. In October 2025, she competed at the 2025 Judo Grand Prix Lima and won a silver medal in the –63 kg category. During the final she lost to Canada's Jessica Klimkait, an Olympic medalist and former world champion who moved up a weight class for this new Olympic cycle.

In April 2026, she competed at the 2026 Pan American Judo Championships and won a gold medal in the –70 kg category. The next month she competed at the 2026 Judo Grand Slam Astana and won a bronze medal in the –70 kg category, her first career Judo Grand Slam medal.

In September 2026, she competed at the 2026 South American Games and won a gold medal in the –70 kg category and mixed team events. The next month she competed at the 2026 World Judo Championships in the –70 kg category and lost to Germany's Giovanna Scoccimarro in the bronze medal match.

== Personal life ==
Her sister, Thauana Aparecida das Dores Lopes da Silva, is also a judoka.
