= Judo at the 2026 South American Games =

Judo competitions at the 2026 South American Games

Judo Judo at the 2026 South American Games
- Venue: Invencible Rosario
- Location: Rosario, Santa Fe, Argentina
- Dates: 18–20 September

Competition at external databases
- Links: IJF

Judo competitions at the 2026 South American Games in Rosario, Santa Fe, and Rafaela, Argentina, were held between September 18 and 20 at Invencible Rosario, located within Parque de la Independencia in Rosario.

A total of 17 events were contested (seven men's, seven women's and three mixed). Two mixed couple events were added (Nage-no-kata and Katame-no-kata).

== Medal summary ==
=== Medal table ===
* Host nation (Argentina)

Rank	Nation	Gold	Silver	Bronze	Total
1	Brazil	12	1	2	15
2	Venezuela	2	5	4	11
3	Argentina*	1	3	5	9
4	Colombia	1	1	6	8
5	Chile	1	1	5	7
6	Peru	0	4	2	6
7	Ecuador	0	2	1	3
8	Panama	0	0	2	2
8	Paraguay	0	0	2	2
10	Uruguay	0	0	1	1
Totals (10 entries)		17	17	30	64

=== Medalists ===
==== Men ====
Event	Gold	Silver	Bronze
60 kg	Diego Ismael; Brazil	Angello Urbano; Venezuela	Kobe Chávez; Chile
60 kg	Diego Ismael; Brazil	Angello Urbano; Venezuela	Galo Villavicencio; Argentina
66 kg	Ronald Oliveira; Brazil	Jonathan Benavides; Ecuador	Joaquín Tovagliari; Argentina
66 kg	Ronald Oliveira; Brazil	Jonathan Benavides; Ecuador	Willis García; Venezuela
73 kg	Guilherme Castro; Brazil	Alonso Wong; Peru	Ferney Ruiz; Colombia
73 kg	Guilherme Castro; Brazil	Alonso Wong; Peru	Ronal González; Panama
81 kg	Gabriel Falcão; Brazil	Agustín Gil; Argentina	Jorge Pérez; Chile
81 kg	Gabriel Falcão; Brazil	Agustín Gil; Argentina	John Pérez; Colombia
90 kg	Marcelo Gomes; Brazil	Roberto Galarreta; Peru	Tomás Quinteros; Argentina
90 kg	Marcelo Gomes; Brazil	Roberto Galarreta; Peru	Jhon Caicedo; Colombia
100 kg	Thomas Briceño; Chile	Samuel Corzo; Venezuela	Ivo Dargoltz; Argentina
100 kg	Thomas Briceño; Chile	Samuel Corzo; Venezuela	Wilgner Mendes; Brazil
+100 kg	Andrey Coelho; Brazil	Francisco Solís; Chile	Sandy Caraballo; Uruguay
+100 kg	Andrey Coelho; Brazil	Francisco Solís; Chile	Luis Amezquita; Venezuela

==== Women ====
Event	Gold	Silver	Bronze
48 kg	Sara Mauer; Brazil	Gabriela Miranda; Venezuela	Mary Dee Vargas; Chile
48 kg	Sara Mauer; Brazil	Gabriela Miranda; Venezuela	Gabriela Narvaez; Paraguay
52 kg	Rafaela Cavalcanti; Brazil	Driulys Rivs; Peru	Wendy Golu; Colombia
52 kg	Rafaela Cavalcanti; Brazil	Driulys Rivs; Peru	Paloma Narvaez; Paraguay
57 kg	Gyovanna da Silva; Brazil	Astrid Gavidia; Ecuador	Marcela Alfaro; Chile
57 kg	Gyovanna da Silva; Brazil	Astrid Gavidia; Ecuador	Kristine Jiménez; Panama
63 kg	Anriquelis Barrios; Venezuela	Agustina De Lucía; Argentina	Pietra Estrela; Brazil
63 kg	Anriquelis Barrios; Venezuela	Agustina De Lucía; Argentina	Allyson Quevedo; Chile
70 kg	Nauana Dores; Brazil	Eliana Aguiar; Venezuela	Celinda Corozo; Ecuador
78 kg	Elvismar Rodríguez; Venezuela	Beatriz Furtado; Brazil	Brenda Olaya; Colombia
+78 kg	Ana de Sousa; Brazil	Karen León; Venezuela	Brigitte Carabalí; Colombia
+78 kg	Ana de Sousa; Brazil	Karen León; Venezuela	Camila Figueroa; Peru

==== Mixed ====
Event	Gold	Silver	Bronze
Nage no kata	Colombia; Edwin Gómez; Gerardo Restrepo	Argentina; Pablo Aguirre; Sebastián Nunes	Venezuela; Jender Guevara; Jesús Farías
Katame no kata	Argentina; Pablo Surace; Abel Benedetto	Colombia; Edwin Gómez; Gerardo Restrepo	Peru; Julio Cusi; Dilmer Calle
Team	Brazil; Ana de Sousa; Andrey Coelho; Beatriz Furtado; Diego Ismael; Gabriel Falcão; Guilherme Castro; Gyovanna da Silva; Marcelo Gomes; Nauana Dores; Pietra Estrela; Rafael Cavalcanti; Ronald Oliveira; Sarah Mauer; Wilgner Mendes	Peru; Benjamín Burnside; Javier Saavedra; Daryl Yamamoto; Driulys Rivas; Jefferson Sedano; Prizzila Lam; Roberto Galarreta; Carla León; Xsara Morales; Alonso Wong; Franco Baltazar; Marián Flores; Camila Figueroa	Argentina; Galo Villavicencio; Agustín Gil; Ivo Dargoltz; Joaquín Tovagliari; Mikaela Rojas; Agustina de Lucía; Iván Gómez; Tomás Quinteros; Nayla Burzio; Brisa Gómez; Amanda Bredeston; Nicole Piscina
Team	Brazil; Ana de Sousa; Andrey Coelho; Beatriz Furtado; Diego Ismael; Gabriel Falcão; Guilherme Castro; Gyovanna da Silva; Marcelo Gomes; Nauana Dores; Pietra Estrela; Rafael Cavalcanti; Ronald Oliveira; Sarah Mauer; Wilgner Mendes	Peru; Benjamín Burnside; Javier Saavedra; Daryl Yamamoto; Driulys Rivas; Jefferson Sedano; Prizzila Lam; Roberto Galarreta; Carla León; Xsara Morales; Alonso Wong; Franco Baltazar; Marián Flores; Camila Figueroa	Venezuela; Angelio Urbano; Willis García; Andrés Pariche; Jonhelius Patete; Luis Amezquita; Audreys Pacheco; Anriquelis Barrios; Eliana Aguiar; Karen León; Samuel Corzo; Luis Pariche; Leomaris Ruiz; Elvismar Rodríguez; Gabriela Miranda

== Participation ==
Twelve nations participated in the judo events of the 2026 South American Games.

- Argentina (16)
- Bolivia (6)
- Brazil (14)
- Chile (8)
- Colombia (12)
- Ecuador (6)
- Panama (6)
- Paraguay (9)
- Peru (15)
- Suriname (1)
- Uruguay (6)
- Venezuela (18)

== Results ==
=== Men's 60 kg ===
Main bracket

Quarter-finals
(Argentina) Galo Villavicencio	000 (yellow card)
(Venezuela) Angello Urbano	001
(Brazil) Diego Ismale	010
(Bolivia) Jhamil Huaycho	000
(Ecuador) Juan Pablo Ayala	001
(Peru) Benjamín Burnside	000

Semi-finals
(Chile) Kobe Chávez	000
(Venezuela) Angello Urbano	010
(Brazil) Diego Ismael	001 (yellow card)
(Ecuador) Juan Pablo Ayala	000

Final
(Venezuela) Angello Urbano	001
(Brazil) Diego Ismael	100

Repechage

Repechage
Bye
Bye
(Bolivia) Jhamil Huaycho	000
(Peru) Benjamín Burnside	001

Bronze medal contests
(Argentina) Galo Villavicencio	010 (yellow card)
(Ecuador) Juan Pablo Ayala	000
(Peru) Benjamín Burnside	000
(Chile) Kobe Chávez	100

=== Men's 66 kg ===
Main bracket

Round of 16
(Bolivia) Emiliano Paz	000
(Venezuela) Willis García	100

Quarter-finals
(Brazil) Ronald Oliveira	102
(Paraguay) Mateo Ortiz	000
(Peru) Franco Baltazar	000
(Venezuela) Willis García	001
(Ecuador) Jonathan Benavides	010 (yellow card)
(Colombia) Jerónimo Pino	000 (yellow card)
(Argentina) Joaquín Tovagliari	100
(Uruguay) Luciano Liori	000

Semi-finals
(Brazil) Ronald Oliveira	100
(Venezuela) Willis García	000 (yellow card)
(Ecuador) Jonathan Benavides	100 (yellow card)
(Argentina) Joaquín Tovagliari	000

Gold medal contest
(Brazil) Ronald Oliveira	002
(Ecuador) Jonathan Benavides	000 (yellow card)

Repechage

Repechage
(Paraguay) Mateo Ortiz	100
(Peru) Franco Baltazar	001 (yellow card)
(Colombia) Jerónimo Pino	100
(Uruguay) Luciano Liori	011 (yellow card)

Bronze medal contests
(Paraguay) Mateo Ortiz	000 (yellow card)
(Argentina) Joaquín Todagliari	110 (yellow card)
(Colombia) Jerónimo Pino	001 (yellow card)
(Venezuela) Willis García	002

=== Men's 73 kg ===
Main bracket

Round of 16
(Bolivia) Arturo Ledezma	000
(Uruguay) Paolo Silva	111
(Ecuador) José González	001 (yellow card)
(Argentina) Iván Gómez	000
(Chile) Tomás Hernández	101
(Paraguay) Ezequiel Duarte	000 (yellow card)

Quarter-finals
(Brazil) Guilherme Castro	101
(Uruguay) Paolo Silva	000
(Panama) Ronal González	101
(Ecuador) José González	000
(Colombia) Ferney Ruiz	001 (yellow card)
(Venezuela) Andrés Pariche	000
(Peru) Alonso Wong	004
(Chile) Tomás Hernández	000

Semi-finals
(Brazil) Guilherme Castro	010
(Panama) Ronal González	000 (yellow card)
(Colombia) Ferney Ruiz	000
(Peru) Alonso Wong	001 (yellow card)

Gold medal contest
(Brazil) Guilherme Castro	101
(Peru) Alonso Wong	000

Repechage

Repechage
(Uruguay) Paolo Silva	000
(Ecuador) José González	100
(Venezuela) Andrés Pariche	000
(Chile) Tomás Hernández	100

Bronze medal contests
(Ecuador) José González	000
(Colombia) Ferney Ruiz	100
(Chile) Tomás Hernández	000
(Panama) Ronal González	100

=== Men's 81 kg ===
Main bracket

Quarter-finals
(Brazil) Gabriel Falcão	001
(Panama) Alexis Harrison	000
(Colombia) Jhon Pérez	100 (yellow card)
(Peru) Javier Saavedra	000
(Argentina) Agustín Gil	100
(Venezuela) Luis Pariche	000 (yellow card)
(Chile) Jorge Pérez	100
(Uruguay) Alain Aprahamian	000

Semi-finals
(Brazil) Gabriel Falcão	001
(Colombia) Jhon Pérez	000
(Argentina) Agustín Gil	010 (yellow card)
(Chile) Jorge Pérez	000 (yellow card)

Final
(Brazil) Gabriel Falcão	010
(Argentina) Agustín Gil	000 (yellow card)

Repechage

Repechage
(Panama) Alexis Harrison	001
(Peru) Javier Saavedra	000
(Venezuela) Luis Pariche	011
(Uruguay) Alain Aprahamian	000

Bronze medal contests
(Panama) Alexis Harrison	000
(Chile) Jorge Pérez	100
(Venezuela) Luis Pariche	000
(Colombia) Jhon Pérez	100

=== Men's 90 kg ===
Main bracket

Quarter-finals
(Brazil) Marcelo Gomes	101
(Venezuela) Johnelius Patete	000
(Colombia) Jhon Caicedo	110
(Paraguay) Edgar Benítez	000
(Panama) José Ortega	000
(Argentina) Tomás Quinteros	100
(Peru) Roberto Galarreta	101
(Uruguay) Juan Gorriz	000 (yellow card)

Semi-finals
(Brazil) Marcelo Gomes	100
(Colombia) Jhon Caicedo	000
(Argentina) Tomás Quinteros	000
(Peru) Roberto Galarreta	101

Final
(Brazil) Marcelo Gomes	100
(Peru) Roberto Galarreta	000

Repechage

Repechage
(Venezuela) Johnelius Patete	100
(Paraguay) Edgar Benítez	000
(Panama) José Ortega	100
(Uruguay) Juan Gorriz	000 (yellow card)

Bronze medal contests
(Venezuela) Johnelius Patete	000 (yellow card)
(Argentina) Tomás Quinteros	100
(Panama) José Ortega	000
(Colombia) Jhon Caicedo	102

=== Men's 100 kg ===
Main bracket

Quarter-finals
(Paraguay) Ángel Gini	000 (yellow card)
(Venezuela) Samuel Corzo	100
(Colombia) Francisco Balanta	000 (yellow card)
(Brazil) Wilgner Mendes	001
(Chile) Thomas Briceño	100
(Peru) Daryl Yamamoto	000

Semi-finals
(Argentina) Ivo Dargoltz	000
(Venezuela) Samuel Corzo	001 (yellow card)
(Brazil) Wilgner Mendes	000 (yellow card)
(Chile) Thomas Briceño	001

Final
(Venezuela) Samuel Corzo	010
(Chile) Thomas Briceño	111 (yellow card)

Repechage

Repechage
Bye
Bye
(Colombia) Francisco Balanta	001
(Peru) Daryl Yamamoto	000 (yellow card)

Bronze medal contests
(Paraguay) Ángel Gini	000 (yellow card)
(Brazil) Wilgner Mendes	100
(Colombia) Francisco Balanta	000 (yellow card)
(Argentina) Ivo Dargoltz	100 (yellow card)

=== Men's +100 kg ===
Main bracket

Quarter-finals
(Uruguay) Sandy Caraballo	100
(Paraguay) Mario Chaparro	000
(Venezuela) Luis Amezquita	102
(Peru) Jefferson Sedano	000 (yellow card)

Semi-finals
(Chile) Francisco Solís	100
(Uruguay) Sandy Caraballo	000
(Brazil) Andrey de Souza	101 (yellow card)
(Venezuela) Luis Amezquita	000 (yellow card)

Final
(Chile) Francisco Solís	000
(Brazil) Andrey de Souza	100

Repechage

Repechage
Bye
Bye
Bye
Bye

Bronze medal contests
(Paraguay) Mario Chaparro	000
(Venezuela) Luis Amezquita	100 (yellow card)
(Peru) Jefferson Sedano	000
(Uruguay) Sandy Caraballo	101

=== Women's 48 kg ===
Main bracket

Round of 16
(Bolivia) Noelia Paz	000
(Paraguay) Gabriela Narváez	100
(Argentina) Mikaela Rojas	000
(Peru) Carla León	100 (yellow card)

Quarter-finals
(Chile) Mary Dee Vargas	000
(Brazil) Sarah Mauer	100
(Colombia) Erika Lasso	000
(Paraguay) Gabriela Narváez	003 (yellow card)
(Ecuador) Laura Vásquez	010
(Peru) Carla León	000
(Panama) Nemesis Candelo	000
(Venezuela) Gabriela Miranda	001 (yellow card)

Semi-finals
(Brazil) Sarah Mauer	100
(Paraguay) Gabriela Narváez	000 (yellow card)
(Ecuador) Laura Vásquez	000
(Venezuela) Gabriela Miranda	001 (yellow card)

Gold medal contest
(Brazil) Sarah Mauer	100
(Venezuela) Gabriela Miranda	000

Repechage

Repechage
(Chile) Mary Dee Vargas	001
(Colombia) Erika Lasso	000
(Peru) Carla León	100 (yellow card)
(Panama) Némesis Candelo	000

Bronze medal contests
(Chile) Mary Dee Vargas	010 (yellow card)
(Ecuador) Laura Vásquez	000 (yellow card)
(Peru) Carla León	001 (yellow card)
(Paraguay) Gabriela Narváez	101 (yellow card)

=== Women's 52 kg ===
Main bracket

Quarter-finals
(Peru) Driulys Rivas	010
(Paraguay) Paloma Narváez	000 (yellow card)
(Colombia) Wendy Golu	001 (yellow card)
(Bolivia) Linett Toledo	000
(Brazil) Rafaela Cavalcanti	101 (yellow card)
(Argentina) Nayla Burzio	000 (yellow card)
(Venezuela) Leomaris Ruiz	DNS
(Panama) Julieta Escobar	100

Semi-finals
(Peru) Driulys Rivas	100
(Colombia) Wendy Golu	000
(Brazil) Rafaela Cavalcanti	011
(Panama) Julieta Escobar	000 (yellow card)

Final
(Peru) Driulys Rivas	000
(Brazil) Rafaela Cavalcanti	002

Repechage

Repechage
(Paraguay) Paloma Narváez	100
(Bolivia) Linett Toledo	000 (yellow card)
(Argentina) Nayla Burzio	100
(Venezuela) Leomaris Ruiz	DNS

Bronze medal contests
(Paraguay) Paloma Narváez	100
(Panama) Julieta Escobar	000
(Argentina) Nayla Burzio	000
(Colombia) Wendy Golu	102

=== Women's 57 kg ===
Main bracket

Round of 16
(Peru) Marian Flores	000 (yellow card)
(Chile) Marcela Alfaro	011

Quarter-finals
(Colombia) María Villalba	DNS
(Panama) Kristine Jiménez	100
(Ecuador) Astrid Gavidia	001
(Chile) Marcela Alfaro	000
(Brazil) Gyovanna da Dilva	100
(Venezuela) Audreys Pacheco	010
(Uruguay) Maya Leopold	001
(Argentina) Brisa Gómez	000 (yellow card)

Semi-finals
(Panama) Kristine Jiménez	000 (yellow card)
(Ecuador) Astrid Gavidia	002 (yellow card)
(Brazil) Gyovanna da Dilva	001 (yellow card)
(Uruguay) Maya Leopold	000

Gold medal contest
(Ecuador) Astrid Gavidia	000
(Brazil) Gyovanna da Dilva	002

Repechage

Repechage
(Colombia) María Villalba	000
(Chile) Marcela Alfaro	100
(Venezuela) Audreys Pacheco	000
(Argentina) Brisa Gómez	010

Bronze medal contests
(Chile) Marcela Alfaro	002
(Uruguay) Maya Leopold	000
(Argentina) Brisa Gómez	000
(Panama) Kristine Jiménez	011

=== Women's 63 kg ===
Main bracket

Quarter-finals
(Peru) Prizzila Lam	000 (yellow card)
(Brazil) Pietra Estrela	011 (yellow card)
(Argentina) Agustina de Lucía	100 (yellow card)
(Bolivia) Adriana Ledezma	000

Semi-finals
(Venezuela) Anriquelis Barrios	010 (yellow card)
(Brazil) Pietra Estrela	000
(Chile) Allyson Quevedo	000
(Argentina) Agustina de Lucía	001 (yellow card)

Final
(Venezuela) Anriquelis Barrios	010 (yellow card)
(Argentina) Agustina de Lucía	000 (yellow card)

Repechage

Repechage
Bye
Bye
Bye
Bye

Bronze medal contests
(Peru) Prizzila Lam	000
(Chile) Allyson Quevedo	102
(Bolivia) Adriana Ledezma	000 (yellow card)
(Brazil) Pietra Estrela	010

=== Women's 70 kg ===
Rank	Judoka	Nation	Played	Won	Lost	Points
1st place, gold medalist(s)	Nauana Dores	Brazil	3	3	0	6
2nd place, silver medalist(s)	Eliana Aguiar	Venezuela	3	2	1	4
3rd place, bronze medalist(s)	Celinda Corozo	Ecuador	3	1	2	2
4	Xsara Morales	Peru	3	0	3	0

=== Women's 78 kg ===
Rank	Judoka	Nation	Played	Won	Lost	Points
1st place, gold medalist(s)	Elvismar Rodríguez	Venezuela	3	3	0	6
2nd place, silver medalist(s)	Beatriz Furtado	Brazil	3	2	1	4
3rd place, bronze medalist(s)	Brenda Olaya	Colombia	3	1	2	2
4	Nicole Piscina	Argentina	3	0	3	0

=== Women's +78 kg ===
Rank	Judoka	Nation	Played	Won	Lost	Points
1st place, gold medalist(s)	Ana de Sousa	Brazil	4	4	0	8
2nd place, silver medalist(s)	Karen León	Venezuela	4	3	1	6
3rd place, bronze medalist(s)	Brigitte Carabali	Colombia	4	2	2	4
4	Camila Figueroa	Peru	4	1	3	2
5	Amanda Bredeston	Argentina	4	0	4	0

=== Nage no kata ===
Rank	Judokas	Nation	Total
1st place, gold medalist(s)	Edwin Gómez; Gerardo Restrepo	Colombia	391.0
2nd place, silver medalist(s)	Pablo Aguirre; Sebastián Nunes	Argentina	377.5
3rd place, bronze medalist(s)	Jender Guevara; Jesús Farías	Venezuela	353.0
4	Evelin González; Gabriela Marecos	Paraguay	123.0

=== Katame no kata ===
Rank	Judokas	Nation	Total
1st place, gold medalist(s)	Pablo Surace; Abel Benedetto	Argentina	385.5
2nd place, silver medalist(s)	Edwin Gómez; Gerardo Restrepo	Colombia	373.5
3rd place, bronze medalist(s)	Julio Cusi; Dilmer Calle	Peru	350.5
4	Henrry Vargas; Jellyfel Guevara	Venezuela	335.5

=== Mixed team ===
Main bracket

Quarter-finals
Venezuela	004
Argentina	002
Chile	003
Colombia	004

Semi-finals
Brazil	4
Venezuela	1
Peru	4
Colombia	1

Final
Brazil	004
Peru	000

Repechage

Repechage
Bye
Bye
Bye
Bye

Bronze medal contests
Argentina	004
Colombia	003
Chile	001
Venezuela	004
