= 2025 European Judo Championships – Women's 63 kg =

Judo competition

Judo Women's 63 kg at the 2025 European Judo Championships
- Venue: Morača Sports Center
- Location: Podgorica, Montenegro
- Date: 24 April 2025
- Competitors: 31 from 20 nations

Medalists
gold medal	Renata Zachová (2nd title)	Czech Republic
silver medal	Clarisse Agbegnenou	France
bronze medal	Joanne van Lieshout	Netherlands
bronze medal	Carlotta Avanzato	Italy

Competition at external databases
- Links: IJF • JudoInside

The women's 63 kg competition at the 2025 European Judo Championships was held at the Morača Sports Center in Podgorica, Montenegro on 24 April 2025.

== Results ==
=== Finals ===
Semi-finals
(Czech Republic) Renata Zachová	100
(Italy) Carlotta Avanzato	000
(France) Clarisse Agbegnenou	010 (yellow card)
(France) Manon Deketer	000 (yellow card)

Final
(Czech Republic) Renata Zachová	100
(France) Clarisse Agbegnenou	000

=== Repechage ===
Repechage
(Netherlands) Joanne van Lieshout	100
(Croatia) Iva Oberan	000
(Israel) Inbal Shemesh	000
(Austria) Lubjana Piovesana	100

Bronze medal
(Netherlands) Joanne van Lieshout	100 (yellow card)
(France) Manon Deketer	000
(Austria) Lubjana Piovesana	000
(Italy) Carlotta Avanzato	001 (yellow card)

=== Pool A ===
First round
(Romania) Amanda Zuaznabar-Torres	001
(Hungary) Brigitta Varga	000
(Czech Republic) Renata Zachová	001
(Israel) Gili Sharir	000
(Bosnia and Herzegovina) Anđela Samardžić	000
(Spain) Laura Vázquez	100

Round of 16
(Netherlands) Joanne van Lieshout	100
(Romania) Amanda Zuaznabar-Torres	000
(Czech Republic) Renata Zachová	010 (yellow card)
(Spain) Laura Vázquez	000 (yellow card)

Quarter-finals
(Netherlands) Joanne van Lieshout	000
(Czech Republic) Renata Zachová	002

=== Pool B ===
First round
(Croatia) Katarina Krišto	000
(Italy) Carlotta Avanzato	100 (yellow card)
(Serbia) Anja Obradović	000 (yellow card)
(Poland) Natalia Kropska	100 (yellow card)
(Croatia) Iva Oberan	010 (yellow card)
(Austria) Lisa Tretnjak	000
(International Judo Federation) Yana Makretskaya	000
(Turkey) Minel Akdeniz	100

Round of 16
(Italy) Carlotta Avanzato	100 (yellow card)
(Poland) Natalia Kropska	000
(Croatia) Iva Oberan	100
(Turkey) Minel Akdeniz	000

Quarter-finals
(Italy) Carlotta Avanzato	001 (yellow card)
(Croatia) Iva Oberan	000

=== Pool C ===
First round
(France) Clarisse Agbegnenou	100
(Italy) Savita Russo	000
(Georgia (country)) Eter Askilashvili	000
(Netherlands) Geke van den Berg	100
(Poland) Angelika Szymańska	020
(Bulgaria) Yoana Manova	000 (yellow card)
(Israel) Inbal Shemesh	020 (yellow card)
(Ukraine) Anastasiia Antipina	001

Round of 16
(France) Clarisse Agbegnenou	010
(Netherlands) Geke van den Berg	000
(Poland) Angelika Szymańska	000
(Israel) Inbal Shemesh	100

Quarter-finals
(France) Clarisse Agbegnenou	001
(Israel) Inbal Shemesh	000 (yellow card)

=== Pool D ===
First round
(Austria) Lubjana Piovesana	001
(Slovenia) Kaja Kajzer	000
(Turkey) Ayten Yeksan	100
(Hungary) Anna Kriza	000
(France) Manon Deketer	010
(Spain) Cristina Cabaña	000
(International Judo Federation) Kamila Badurova	000
(Germany) Friederike Stolze	001

Round of 16
(Austria) Lubjana Piovesana	100
(Turkey) Ayten Yeksan	000
(France) Manon Deketer	001
(Germany) Friederike Stolze	000

Quarter-finals
(Austria) Lubjana Piovesana	000
(France) Manon Deketer	101 (yellow card)
