= Ayten Yeksan =

Turkish judoka (born 2002)

Personal information
- Full name: Ayten Mediha Yeksan
- Born: 17 March 2002 (age 24) Samsun, Turkey
- Occupation: Judoka

Sport
- Country: Turkey
- Sport: Judo
- Weight class: ‍–‍63 kg
- Rank: Black belt

Achievements and titles
- European Champ.: R16 (2022, 2025)
Medal record
Women's judo
Representing Turkey
Islamic Solidarity Games
Gold medal – first place	2025 Riyadh	‍–‍63 kg
Bronze medal – third place	2025 Riyadh	Mixed team
European Cadet Championships
Bronze medal – third place	2019 Warsaw	‍–‍63 kg

Profile at external databases
- IJF: 36892
- JudoInside.com: 112316
- Updated on 16 November 2025

Ayten Mediha Yeksan (born 17 March 2002) is a Turkish female judoka who competes in the light welterweight ‍–‍63 kg) division and the mixed team event.

== Sport career ==
Yeksan started her judo career at İlkadım GH Youth and Sports Club in her hometown. She then transferred to Galatasaray Judo.

=== 2019 ===
Yeksan took the bronze medal in the ‍–‍63 kg event and won the gold medal in the mixed team event at the 2019 European Cadet Championships in Warsaw, Poland.

=== 2021 ===
Yeksan was the member of the bronze medalist mixed team at the 2021 World Juniors Championships in Olbia, Italy.

=== 2022 ===
Yeksan won the bronze medal at the Junior European Cup 2022 in Warsaw European Open 2022 in Poland. At the Paks Junior European Cup 2022 in Hungary, she became bronze medalist. She won the silver medal with the Turkish mixed team at the 2022 European Junior Championships in Prague, Chechia. AT the 2022 European Championships in Sofia, Bulgaria, she was unable to advance from the round of 16. Also at the 2022 Mediterranean Games in Oran, Algeria, she lost the round of 16 match.

=== 2025 ===
At the Warsaw European Open 2025 in Poland, Yeksan took the bronze medal. She won the silver medal at the Prague European Open 2025 in Czechia. She won the gold medal at the Malaga Senior European Cup 2025 in Spain. She took part at the 2025 European Championships in Podgorica, Montenegro, and lost the round of 16 match. She captured the gold medal in the ‍–‍63 kg individual event and the bronze medal in the mixed team event at the 2025 Islamic Solidarity Games in Riyadh, Saudi Arabia.

== Personal life ==
Ayten Mediha Yeksan was born in Samsun, northern Turkey on 17 March 2001.

She is a student of Physical Education and Sports Teaching in the Kırkpınar Faculty of Sports Science at Trakya University.
