= 2018 Judo Grand Slam Düsseldorf =

Judo competition

Judo 2018 Judo Grand Slam Düsseldorf
- Venue: ISS Dome, Düsseldorf
- Location: Düsseldorf, Germany
- Dates: 23–25 February 2018
- Competitors: 446 from 65 nations

Competition at external databases
- Links: IJF • EJU • JudoInside

The 2018 Judo Grand Slam Düsseldorf was held in Düsseldorf, Germany, from 23 to 25 February 2018.

== Medal summary ==
=== Men's events ===
Event	Gold	Silver	Bronze
Extra-lightweight (−60 kg)	Ryuju Nagayama (JPN)	Robert Mshvidobadze (RUS)	Lukhumi Chkhvimiani (GEO)
Extra-lightweight (−60 kg)	Ryuju Nagayama (JPN)	Robert Mshvidobadze (RUS)	Eric Takabatake (BRA)
Half-lightweight (−66 kg)	Kenzo Tagawa (JPN)	Georgii Zantaraia (UKR)	Battogtokhyn Erkhembayar (MGL)
Half-lightweight (−66 kg)	Kenzo Tagawa (JPN)	Georgii Zantaraia (UKR)	Baruch Shmailov (ISR)
Lightweight (−73 kg)	Shohei Ono (JPN)	Rustam Orujov (AZE)	Tohar Butbul (ISR)
Lightweight (−73 kg)	Shohei Ono (JPN)	Rustam Orujov (AZE)	Ferdinand Karapetian (ARM)
Half-middleweight (−81 kg)	Saeid Mollaei (IRI)	Alpha Oumar Djalo (FRA)	Aslan Lappinagov (RUS)
Half-middleweight (−81 kg)	Saeid Mollaei (IRI)	Alpha Oumar Djalo (FRA)	Dominic Ressel (GER)
Middleweight (−90 kg)	Mikhail Igolnikov (RUS)	Mashu Baker (JPN)	Gantulgyn Altanbagana (MGL)
Middleweight (−90 kg)	Mikhail Igolnikov (RUS)	Mashu Baker (JPN)	Nikoloz Sherazadishvili (ESP)
Half-heavyweight (−100 kg)	Varlam Liparteliani (GEO)	Benjamin Fletcher (IRL)	Niyaz Bilalov (RUS)
Half-heavyweight (−100 kg)	Varlam Liparteliani (GEO)	Benjamin Fletcher (IRL)	Jorge Fonseca (POR)
Heavyweight (+100 kg)	Not awarded	Takeshi Ōjitani (JPN)	Bolot Toktogonov (KGZ)
Heavyweight (+100 kg)	Not awarded	Hisayoshi Harasawa (JPN)	Andrey Volkov (RUS)

=== Women's events ===
Event	Gold	Silver	Bronze
Extra-lightweight (−48 kg)	Daria Bilodid (UKR)	Éva Csernoviczki (HUN)	Milica Nikolić (SRB)
Extra-lightweight (−48 kg)	Daria Bilodid (UKR)	Éva Csernoviczki (HUN)	Mélanie Clément (FRA)
Half-lightweight (−52 kg)	Ai Shishime (JPN)	Karolina Pieńkowska (POL)	Estrella López Sheriff (ESP)
Half-lightweight (−52 kg)	Ai Shishime (JPN)	Karolina Pieńkowska (POL)	Charline Van Snick (BEL)
Lightweight (−57 kg)	Nekoda Smythe-Davis (GBR)	Hedvig Karakas (HUN)	Lkhagvatogoogiin Enkhriilen (MGL)
Lightweight (−57 kg)	Nekoda Smythe-Davis (GBR)	Hedvig Karakas (HUN)	Sarah-Léonie Cysique (FRA)
Half-middleweight (−63 kg)	Andreja Leški (SLO)	Megumi Horikawa (JPN)	Kiyomi Watanabe (PHI)
Half-middleweight (−63 kg)	Andreja Leški (SLO)	Megumi Horikawa (JPN)	Boldyn Gankhaich (MGL)
Middleweight (−70 kg)	Yoko Ono (JPN)	Barbara Matić (CRO)	Sanne van Dijke (NED)
Middleweight (−70 kg)	Yoko Ono (JPN)	Barbara Matić (CRO)	Szaundra Diedrich (GER)
Half-heavyweight (−78 kg)	Ruika Sato (JPN)	Mayra Aguiar (BRA)	Klara Apotekar (SLO)
Half-heavyweight (−78 kg)	Ruika Sato (JPN)	Mayra Aguiar (BRA)	Natalie Powell (GBR)
Heavyweight (+78 kg)	Sarah Asahina (JPN)	Nihel Cheikh Rouhou (TUN)	Kim Ha-yun (KOR)
Heavyweight (+78 kg)	Sarah Asahina (JPN)	Nihel Cheikh Rouhou (TUN)	Iryna Kindzerska (AZE)

Source Results

=== Medal table ===
* Host nation (Germany)

Rank	Nation	Gold	Silver	Bronze	Total
1	Japan (JPN)	7	4	0	11
2	Russia (RUS)	1	1	3	5
3	Ukraine (UKR)	1	1	0	2
4	Georgia (GEO)	1	0	1	2
4	Great Britain (GBR)	1	0	1	2
4	Slovenia (SLO)	1	0	1	2
7	Iran (IRI)	1	0	0	1
8	Hungary (HUN)	0	2	0	2
9	France (FRA)	0	1	2	3
10	Azerbaijan (AZE)	0	1	1	2
10	Brazil (BRA)	0	1	1	2
12	Croatia (CRO)	0	1	0	1
12	Ireland (IRL)	0	1	0	1
12	Poland (POL)	0	1	0	1
12	Tunisia (TUN)	0	1	0	1
16	Mongolia (MGL)	0	0	4	4
17	Germany (GER)*	0	0	2	2
17	Israel (ISR)	0	0	2	2
17	Spain (ESP)	0	0	2	2
20	Armenia (ARM)	0	0	1	1
20	Belgium (BEL)	0	0	1	1
20	Kyrgyzstan (KGZ)	0	0	1	1
20	Netherlands (NED)	0	0	1	1
20	Philippines (PHI)	0	0	1	1
20	Portugal (POR)	0	0	1	1
20	Serbia (SRB)	0	0	1	1
20	South Korea (KOR)	0	0	1	1
Totals (27 entries)		13	15	28	56
