= 2025 Judo Grand Prix Guadalajara =

Judo Competition

Judo 2025 Judo Grand Prix Guadalajara
- Venue: Unidad Deportiva Lopez Mateos
- Location: Guadalajara, Mexico
- Dates: 17–19 October 2025
- Competitors: 231 from 33 nations
- Total prize money: €98,000

Competition at external databases
- Links: IJF • JudoInside

The 2025 Judo Grand Prix Guadalajara was held at the Unidad Deportiva Lopez Mateos arena in Guadalajara, Mexico from 17 to 19 October 2025 as part of the IJF World Tour.

== Medal summary ==
=== Men's events ===
Event	Gold	Silver	Bronze
Extra-lightweight (−60 kg)	Balabay Aghayev (AZE)	Michel Augusto (BRA)	Jorre Verstraeten (BEL)
Extra-lightweight (−60 kg)	Balabay Aghayev (AZE)	Michel Augusto (BRA)	Ahmad Yusifov (AZE)
Half-lightweight (−66 kg)	Ruslan Pashayev (AZE)	Luukas Saha (FIN)	Adrian Nieto Chinarro (ESP)
Half-lightweight (−66 kg)	Ruslan Pashayev (AZE)	Luukas Saha (FIN)	Daikii Bouba (FRA)
Lightweight (−73 kg)	Hidayat Heydarov (AZE)	Chusniddin Karimov (CZE)	Martin Hojak (SLO)
Lightweight (−73 kg)	Hidayat Heydarov (AZE)	Chusniddin Karimov (CZE)	Rashid Mammadaliyev (AZE)
Half-middleweight (−81 kg)	Vusal Galandarzade (AZE)	Eetu Ihanamäki (FIN)	Mykhailo Svidrak (UKR)
Half-middleweight (−81 kg)	Vusal Galandarzade (AZE)	Eetu Ihanamäki (FIN)	Leonardo Casaglia (ITA)
Middleweight (−90 kg)	Christian Parlati (ITA)	Marcelo Gomes (BRA)	Guilherme Schimidt (BRA)
Middleweight (−90 kg)	Christian Parlati (ITA)	Marcelo Gomes (BRA)	Murad Fatiyev (AZE)
Half-heavyweight (−100 kg)	Zelym Kotsoiev (AZE)	Gennaro Pirelli (ITA)	Leonardo Gonçalves (BRA)
Half-heavyweight (−100 kg)	Zelym Kotsoiev (AZE)	Gennaro Pirelli (ITA)	Anton Savytskiy (UKR)
Heavyweight (+100 kg)	Ushangi Kokauri (AZE)	Lukáš Krpálek (CZE)	Rafael Buzacarini (BRA)
Heavyweight (+100 kg)	Ushangi Kokauri (AZE)	Lukáš Krpálek (CZE)	Martti Puumalainen (FIN)

=== Women's events ===
Event	Gold	Silver	Bronze
Extra-lightweight (−48 kg)	Maria Celia Laborde (USA)	Eva Pérez Soler (ESP)	Mary Dee Vargas (CHI)
Extra-lightweight (−48 kg)	Maria Celia Laborde (USA)	Eva Pérez Soler (ESP)	Tamar Malca (ISR)
Half-lightweight (−52 kg)	Jéssica Pereira (BRA)	Ayumi Leiva Sánchez (ESP)	Nicole Marques (BRA)
Half-lightweight (−52 kg)	Jéssica Pereira (BRA)	Ayumi Leiva Sánchez (ESP)	Gefen Primo (ISR)
Lightweight (−57 kg)	Amandine Buchard (FRA)	Ophelie Vellozzi (FRA)	Shirlen Nascimento (BRA)
Lightweight (−57 kg)	Amandine Buchard (FRA)	Ophelie Vellozzi (FRA)	Acelya Toprak (GBR)
Half-middleweight (−63 kg)	Haruka Kaju (JPN)	Jessica Klimkait (CAN)	Rafaela Silva (BRA)
Half-middleweight (−63 kg)	Haruka Kaju (JPN)	Jessica Klimkait (CAN)	Nauana Silva (BRA)
Middleweight (−70 kg)	Lara Cvjetko (CRO)	Dena Pohl (GER)	Kaillany Cardoso (BRA)
Middleweight (−70 kg)	Lara Cvjetko (CRO)	Dena Pohl (GER)	Gabriella Willems (BEL)
Half-heavyweight (−78 kg)	Kurena Ikeda (JPN)	Beatriz Freitas (BRA)	Kaïla Issoufi (FRA)
Half-heavyweight (−78 kg)	Kurena Ikeda (JPN)	Beatriz Freitas (BRA)	Metka Lobnik (SLO)
Heavyweight (+78 kg)	Raz Hershko (ISR)	Helena Vuković (CRO)	Karen León (VEN)
Heavyweight (+78 kg)	Raz Hershko (ISR)	Helena Vuković (CRO)	Giovanna Santos (BRA)

=== Medal table ===
* Host nation (Mexico)

Rank	Nation	Gold	Silver	Bronze	Total
1	Azerbaijan (AZE)	6	0	3	9
2	Japan (JPN)	2	0	0	2
3	Brazil (BRA)	1	3	9	13
4	France (FRA)	1	1	2	4
5	Italy (ITA)	1	1	1	3
6	Croatia (CRO)	1	1	0	2
7	Israel (ISR)	1	0	2	3
8	United States (USA)	1	0	0	1
9	Finland (FIN)	0	2	1	3
9	Spain (ESP)	0	2	1	3
11	Czech Republic (CZE)	0	2	0	2
12	Canada (CAN)	0	1	0	1
12	Germany (GER)	0	1	0	1
14	Belgium (BEL)	0	0	2	2
14	Slovenia (SLO)	0	0	2	2
14	Ukraine (UKR)	0	0	2	2
17	Chile (CHI)	0	0	1	1
17	Great Britain (GBR)	0	0	1	1
17	Venezuela (VEN)	0	0	1	1
Totals (19 entries)		14	14	28	56

== Prize money ==
The sums written are per medalist, bringing the total prizes awarded to €98,000. (retrieved from:)

Medal	Total	Judoka	Coach
Gold	€3,000	€2,400	€600
Silver	€2,000	€1,600	€400
Bronze	€1,000	€800	€200
