= Shelley Ludford =

British judoka (born 1998)

Personal information
- Born: 8 December 1998 (age 27) Basingstoke
- Occupation: Judoka
- Height: 175 cm (5 ft 9 in)

Sport
- Country: Great Britain
- Sport: Judo
- Weight class: ‍–‍78 kg
- Club: Judo Club Osaka

Achievements and titles
- European Champ.: R16 (2026)
Medal record
Women's judo
Representing Great Britain
World Juniors Championships
Bronze medal – third place	2018 Nassau	‍–‍78 kg

Profile at external databases
- IJF: 20978
- JudoInside.com: 81881
- Updated on 19 April 2026

Shelley Ludford (born 8 December 1998) is a British judoka.

== Judo career ==
Ludford is three times champion of Great Britain, winning the half-heavyweight (-78 kg) division at the British Judo Championships in 2017, 2019 and 2022.

As a junior, she won the 2018 European Junior Cup in Kaunas and a Junior World Bronze medal in Nassau, Bahamas. The following year she won the Senior European Cup in Podčetrtek.
