= Inbal Shemesh =

Israeli judoka

Personal information
- Native name: ענבל שמש
- Born: 14 December 1996 (age 29)
- Occupation: Judoka

Sport
- Country: Israel
- Sport: Judo
- Weight class: ‍–‍63 kg, ‍–‍57 kg
- Rank: Black belt
- Club: Maccabi Haifa

Achievements and titles
- World Champ.: R16 (2023)
- European Champ.: 7th (2025)
- Highest world ranking: 9^{th}
Medal record
Women's judo
Representing Israel
IJF Grand Slam
Gold medal – first place	2022 Tbilisi	‍–‍63 kg
Gold medal – first place	2022 Baku	‍–‍63 kg
Silver medal – second place	2023 Antalya	‍–‍63 kg
Silver medal – second place	2025 Tashkent	‍–‍63 kg
Silver medal – second place	2026 Tbilisi	‍–‍57 kg
IJF Grand Prix
Silver medal – second place	2019 Tel Aviv	‍–‍63 kg
Silver medal – second place	2026 Zagreb	‍–‍57 kg
Bronze medal – third place	2018 Agadir	‍–‍63 kg
Bronze medal – third place	2019 Tashkent	‍–‍63 kg
Bronze medal – third place	2024 Odivelas	‍–‍63 kg
European U23 Championships
Bronze medal – third place	2018 Győr	‍–‍63 kg
European Junior Championships
Bronze medal – third place	2016 Málaga	‍–‍63 kg
European Cadet Championships
Bronze medal – third place	2013 Tallinn	‍–‍52 kg
Maccabiah Games
Gold medal – first place	2017 Israel	‍–‍63 kg

Profile at external databases
- IJF: 13716
- JudoInside.com: 86912
- Updated on 15 November 2026

Inbal Shemesh (Hebrew: ענבל שמש; born 14 December 1996) is an Israeli judoka.

== Career ==
Shemesh competes in the under 63 kg weight category, and won a silver medal in the 2019 Tel Aviv Grand Prix.

Earlier in her career, Shemesh won bronze medals at the 2013 European Cadet Championships, the 2016 European Junior Championships and the 2018 European U23 Championships.

Shemesh won a gold medal at the 2017 Maccabiah Games.

Throughout 2022, Shemesh has won two gold medals at IJF Grand Slams. Her first was in June at the 2022 Tbilisi Grand Slam with a finals win over 2008 Olympic bronze medalist Ketleyn Quadros of Brazil. Her second was in November at the 2022 Baku Grand Slam with an ippon in golden score against Geke van den Berg of the Netherlands.

== Titles ==
Year	Tournament	Place	Ref.
2018	Grand Prix Agadir	3rd place, bronze medalist(s)	
2019	Grand Prix Tel Aviv	2nd place, silver medalist(s)	
2019	Grand Prix Tashkent	3rd place, bronze medalist(s)	
2022	Grand Slam Tbilisi	1st place, gold medalist(s)	
2022	Grand Slam Baku	1st place, gold medalist(s)	
2023	Grand Slam Antalya	2nd place, silver medalist(s)	
2024	Grand Prix Odivelas	3rd place, bronze medalist(s)	
2025	Grand Slam Tashkent	2nd place, silver medalist(s)	
2026	Grand Slam Tbilisi	2nd place, silver medalist(s)	
