= 2026 World Judo Championships – Women's 78 kg =

Judo competition

Judo Women's 78 kg at the 2026 World Judo Championships
- Venue: National Gymnastics Arena
- Location: Baku, Azerbaijan
- Date: 9 October 2026
- Competitors: 44 from 37 nations
- Total prize money: €57,000

Medalists
gold medal	Yelyzaveta Lytvynenko (1st title)	United Arab Emirates
silver medal	Kaïla Issoufi	France
bronze medal	Kurena Ikeda	Japan
bronze medal	Anna Monta Olek	Germany

Competition at external databases
- Links: IJF • JudoInside

The women's 78 kg event at the 2026 World Judo Championships was held at the National Gymnastics Arena in Baku, Azerbaijan on 9 October 2026.

== Results ==
=== Finals ===
Semi-finals
(Germany) Anna Monta Olek	000 (yellow card)
(France) Kaïla Issoufi	001
(United Arab Emirates) Yelyzaveta Lytvynenko	100 (yellow card)
(Portugal) Patrícia Sampaio	000

Final
(France) Kaïla Issoufi	000 (yellow card)
(United Arab Emirates) Yelyzaveta Lytvynenko	020 (yellow card)

=== Repechage ===
Repechage
(Colombia) Brenda Olaya	000
(Japan) Kurena Ikeda	100 (yellow card)
(Netherlands) Yael van Heemst	100
(Brazil) Beatriz Freitas	000 (yellow card)

Bronze medal
(Japan) Kurena Ikeda	001 (yellow card)
(Portugal) Patrícia Sampaio	000 (yellow card)
(Netherlands) Yael van Heemst	000 (yellow card)
(Germany) Anna Monta Olek	020

=== Pool A ===
First round
(Kazakhstan) Aruna Jangeldina	000
(Finland) Emma Krapu	001
(Cyprus) Zanet Michaelidou	000 (yellow card)
(Austria) Elena Dengg	100 (yellow card)
(Serbia) Jovana Stjepanović	000
(Australia) Maria Swan	100

Round of 32
(Germany) Anna Monta Olek	100
(Finland) Emma Krapu	000 (yellow card)
(Uzbekistan) Marjona Kuchimova	010
(South Korea) Lee Jeong-yun	111
(Colombia) Brenda Olaya	100
(Austria) Elena Dengg	000
(Australia) Maria Swan	000
(Romania) Maidelines Gorguet-Veranes	011

Round of 16
(Germany) Anna Monta Olek	100
(South Korea) Lee Jeong-yun	000
(Colombia) Brenda Olaya	100 (yellow card)
(Romania) Maidelines Gorguet-Veranes	000

Quarter-finals
(Germany) Anna Monta Olek	010
(Colombia) Brenda Olaya	001 (yellow card)

=== Pool B ===
First round
(Madagascar) Hajanirina Zo Andriambololona	000
(Guinea) Marie Branser	100
(Cuba) Lianet Cardona	000
(Lithuania) Miglė Julija Dudėnaitė	100
(Ukraine) Anna Kazakova	020
(India) Ishroop Narang	002

Round of 32
(Japan) Kurena Ikeda	100
(Netherlands) Marit Kamps	000
(Guinea) Marie Branser	000
(China) Wu Hongtao	101
(France) Kaïla Issoufi	100
(Lithuania) Miglė Julija Dudėnaitė	000
(Ukraine) Anna Kazakova	100 (yellow card)
(Canada) Coralie Godbout	000

Round of 16
(Japan) Kurena Ikeda	100
(China) Wu Hongtao	000
(France) Kaïla Issoufi	100 (yellow card)
(Ukraine) Anna Kazakova	000

Quarter-finals
(Japan) Kurena Ikeda	000 (yellow card)
(France) Kaïla Issoufi	100

=== Pool C ===
First round
(Peru) Camila Figueroa	000
(Croatia) Petrunjela Pavić	001
(Venezuela) Elvismar Rodríguez	020
(Uzbekistan) Barchinoy Kodirova	000 (yellow card)
(Poland) Eliza Wróblewska	020 (yellow card)
(Lebanon) Aqulina Chayeb	000 (yellow card)

Round of 32
(United Arab Emirates) Yelyzaveta Lytvynenko	100
(Croatia) Petrunjela Pavić	000
(United Kingdom) Emma Reid	000
(France) Audrey Tcheuméo	010 (yellow card)
(Germany) Alina Böhm	000
(Venezuela) Elvismar Rodríguez	100
(Poland) Eliza Wróblewska	000
(Netherlands) Yael van Heemst	001 (yellow card)

Round of 16
(United Arab Emirates) Yelyzaveta Lytvynenko	101
(France) Audrey Tcheuméo	000
(Venezuela) Elvismar Rodríguez	000
(Netherlands) Yael van Heemst	001

Quarter-finals
(United Arab Emirates) Yelyzaveta Lytvynenko	010
(Netherlands) Yael van Heemst	000

=== Pool D ===
First round
(Belarus) Slaviana Rylkevich	000
(China) Ma Zhenzhao	101
(Brazil) Beatriz Freitas	101
(Serbia) Milica Žabić	000 (yellow card)
(United States) Lotanna Onua	000
(Turkey) Tuana Gülenay	101

Round of 32
(Slovenia) Metka Lobnik	000 (yellow card)
(China) Ma Zhenzhao	020 (yellow card)
(Brazil) Beatriz Freitas	100 (yellow card)
(Chinese Taipei) Hsu Wang Shu-huei	000 (yellow card)
(Portugal) Patrícia Sampaio	011
(Turkey) Tuana Gülenay	001
(South Korea) Kim Ju-yun	000
(Belgium) Vicky Verschaere	020

Round of 16
(China) Ma Zhenzhao	000
(Brazil) Beatriz Freitas	110 (yellow card)
(Portugal) Patrícia Sampaio	100
(Belgium) Vicky Verschaere	000

Quarter-finals
(Brazil) Beatriz Freitas	000
(Portugal) Patrícia Sampaio	100

== Prize money ==
The sums listed bring the total prizes awarded to €57,000 for the individual event.

Medal	Total	Judoka	Coach
Gold	€26,000	€20,800	€5,200
Silver	€15,000	€12,000	€3,000
Bronze	€8,000	€6,400	€1,600
