= Megumi Horikawa =

Japanese judoka (born 1995)

Personal information
- Born: 18 October 1995 (age 30)
- Occupation: Judoka

Sport
- Country: Japan
- Sport: Judo
- Weight class: ‍–‍63 kg
- Retired: 25 June 2025

Achievements and titles
- World Champ.: (2022)
- Asian Champ.: (silver) (2016)
Medal record
Women's judo
Representing Japan
World Championships
Gold medal – first place	2022 Tashkent	‍–‍63 kg
Gold medal – first place	2022 Tashkent	Mixed team
Asian Championships
Silver medal – second place	2016 Tashkent	‍–‍63 kg
World Masters
Bronze medal – third place	2023 Budapest	‍–‍63 kg
IJF Grand Slam
Gold medal – first place	2012 Tokyo	‍–‍63 kg
Gold medal – first place	2022 Tel Aviv	‍–‍63 kg
Gold medal – first place	2022 Budapest	‍–‍63 kg
Gold medal – first place	2023 Tashkent	‍–‍63 kg
Silver medal – second place	2018 Düsseldorf	‍–‍63 kg
Bronze medal – third place	2017 Tokyo	‍–‍63 kg
Bronze medal – third place	2021 Baku	‍–‍63 kg
Bronze medal – third place	2022 Tokyo	‍–‍63 kg
IJF Grand Prix
Silver medal – second place	2017 Zagreb	‍–‍63 kg
Bronze medal – third place	2014 Qingdao	‍–‍63 kg
World Juniors Championships
Silver medal – second place	2013 Ljubljana	‍–‍63 kg
Summer Universiade
Gold medal – first place	2015 Gwangju	‍–‍63 kg

Profile at external databases
- IJF: 11650
- JudoInside.com: 84237
- Updated on 5 August 2023

Megumi Horikawa (born Tsugane) (born 18 October 1995) is a Japanese retired judoka.

Horikawa is the gold medalist of the 2012 Tokyo Grand Slam in the ‍–‍63 kg category.

Horikawa won the gold medal in her event at the 2022 Tel Aviv Grand Slam held in Tel Aviv, Israel.
