= 2025 Judo Grand Slam Tokyo =

Judo competition

Judo 2025 Judo Grand Slam Tokyo
- Venue: Tokyo Metropolitan Gymnasium
- Location: Tokyo, Japan
- Dates: 6–7 December 2025
- Competitors: 303 from 41 nations
- Total prize money: €154,000

Competition at external databases
- Links: IJF • JudoInside

The 2025 Judo Grand Slam Tokyo is an edition of the Tokyo Grand Slam tournament, organised by the International Judo Federation. It was held at the Tokyo Metropolitan Gymnasium in Tokyo, Japan from 6 to 7 December 2025 as part of the IJF World Tour.

== Medal summary ==
=== Men's events ===
Event	Gold	Silver	Bronze
Extra-lightweight (−60 kg)	Hayato Kondo (JPN)	Taiki Nakamura (JPN)	Lee Ha-rim (KOR)
Extra-lightweight (−60 kg)	Hayato Kondo (JPN)	Taiki Nakamura (JPN)	Ryuju Nagayama (JPN)
Half-lightweight (−66 kg)	Hifumi Abe (JPN)	Kairi Kentoku (JPN)	Shinsei Hattori (JPN)
Half-lightweight (−66 kg)	Hifumi Abe (JPN)	Kairi Kentoku (JPN)	Takeshi Takeoka (JPN)
Lightweight (−73 kg)	Ryuga Tanaka (JPN)	Keito Kihara (JPN)	Odgereliin Uranbayar (MGL)
Lightweight (−73 kg)	Ryuga Tanaka (JPN)	Keito Kihara (JPN)	Shusuke Uchimura (JPN)
Half-middleweight (−81 kg)	Yuhei Oino (JPN)	Sotaro Fujiwara (JPN)	Timur Arbuzov (RUS)
Half-middleweight (−81 kg)	Yuhei Oino (JPN)	Sotaro Fujiwara (JPN)	Yoshito Hojo (JPN)
Middleweight (−90 kg)	Sanshiro Murao (JPN)	Goki Tajima (JPN)	Komei Kawabata (JPN)
Middleweight (−90 kg)	Sanshiro Murao (JPN)	Goki Tajima (JPN)	Giorgi Jabniashvili (GEO)
Half-heavyweight (−100 kg)	Ilia Sulamanidze (GEO)	Dota Arai (JPN)	Ryotaro Masuchi (JPN)
Half-heavyweight (−100 kg)	Ilia Sulamanidze (GEO)	Dota Arai (JPN)	Matvey Kanikovskiy (RUS)
Heavyweight (+100 kg)	Valeriy Endovitskiy (RUS)	Hyōga Ōta (JPN)	Inal Tasoev (RUS)
Heavyweight (+100 kg)	Valeriy Endovitskiy (RUS)	Hyōga Ōta (JPN)	Kanta Nakano (JPN)

=== Women's events ===
Event	Gold	Silver	Bronze
Extra-lightweight (−48 kg)	Wakana Koga (JPN)	Sachiyo Yoshino (JPN)	Lin Chen-hao (TPE)
Extra-lightweight (−48 kg)	Wakana Koga (JPN)	Sachiyo Yoshino (JPN)	Mizuki Harada (JPN)
Half-lightweight (−52 kg)	Uta Abe (JPN)	Nanako Tsubone (JPN)	Kokoro Fujishiro (JPN)
Half-lightweight (−52 kg)	Uta Abe (JPN)	Nanako Tsubone (JPN)	Ariane Toro (ESP)
Lightweight (−57 kg)	Akari Omori (JPN)	Momo Tamaoki (JPN)	Mio Shirakane (JPN)
Lightweight (−57 kg)	Akari Omori (JPN)	Momo Tamaoki (JPN)	Eteri Liparteliani (GEO)
Half-middleweight (−63 kg)	Haruka Kaju (JPN)	Kirari Yamaguchi (JPN)	Narumi Tanioka (JPN)
Half-middleweight (−63 kg)	Haruka Kaju (JPN)	Kirari Yamaguchi (JPN)	Renata Zachová (CZE)
Middleweight (−70 kg)	Shiho Tanaka (JPN)	Madina Taimazova (RUS)	Katarzyna Sobierajska (POL)
Middleweight (−70 kg)	Shiho Tanaka (JPN)	Madina Taimazova (RUS)	Ai Tsunoda (ESP)
Half-heavyweight (−78 kg)	Kurena Ikeda (JPN)	Patrícia Sampaio (POR)	Mami Umeki (JPN)
Half-heavyweight (−78 kg)	Kurena Ikeda (JPN)	Patrícia Sampaio (POR)	Mao Izumi (JPN)
Heavyweight (+78 kg)	Lee Hyeon-ji (KOR)	Kim Ha-yun (KOR)	Wakaba Tomita (JPN)
Heavyweight (+78 kg)	Lee Hyeon-ji (KOR)	Kim Ha-yun (KOR)	Romane Dicko (FRA)

=== Medal table ===
* Host nation (Japan)

Rank	Nation	Gold	Silver	Bronze	Total
1	Japan (JPN)*	11	11	15	37
2	Russia (RUS)	1	1	3	5
3	South Korea (KOR)	1	1	1	3
4	Georgia (GEO)	1	0	2	3
5	Portugal (POR)	0	1	0	1
6	Spain (ESP)	0	0	2	2
7	Chinese Taipei (TPE)	0	0	1	1
7	Czech Republic (CZE)	0	0	1	1
7	France (FRA)	0	0	1	1
7	Mongolia (MGL)	0	0	1	1
7	Poland (POL)	0	0	1	1
Totals (11 entries)		14	14	28	56

== Prize money ==
The sums written are per medalist, bringing the total prizes awarded to €154,000. (retrieved from:)

Medal	Total	Judoka	Coach
Gold	€5,000	€4,000	€1,000
Silver	€3,000	€2,400	€600
Bronze	€1,500	€1,200	€300
