= Kerem Primo =

Israeli judoka (born 2005)

Personal information
- Native name: כרם פרימו
- Born: 7 April 2005 (age 21)
- Occupation: Judoka

Sport
- Country: Israel
- Sport: Judo
- Weight class: ‍–‍63 kg

Achievements and titles
- World Champ.: (silver) (2026)
- European Champ.: R32 (2022, 2026)
- Highest world ranking: 13^{th}
Medal record
Women's judo
Representing Israel
World Championships
Silver medal – second place	2026 Baku	‍–‍63 kg
IJF Grand Slam
Bronze medal – third place	2026 Budapest	‍–‍63 kg
IJF Grand Prix
Bronze medal – third place	2026 Linz	‍–‍63 kg
World Juniors Championships
Silver medal – second place	2021 Olbia	‍–‍57 kg
European Junior Championships
Gold medal – first place	2021 Luxembourg	‍–‍57 kg
Bronze medal – third place	2025 Bratislava	‍–‍63 kg
European Cadet Championships
Gold medal – first place	2021 Riga	‍–‍57 kg
European Youth Olympic Festival
Gold medal – first place	2022 Banská Bystrica	‍–‍63 kg
Bronze medal – third place	2022 Banská Bystrica	Mixed team

Profile at external databases
- IJF: 60920
- JudoInside.com: 144213
- Updated on 13 October 2026

Kerem Primo (Hebrew: כרם פרימו; born 7 April 2005) is an Israeli judoka.

== Career ==
In August 2021, Primo competed at the 2021 European Cadet Judo Championships and won a gold medal in the –57 kg category. The next month she competed at the 2021 European Junior Judo Championships and again won a gold medal at 16 years old. In October 2021, she competed at the 2021 World Judo Juniors Championships and won a silver medal in the –57 kg category.

She suffered a torn ACL at the 2023 Judo World Masters in Budapest and missed over two years of competition.

In March 2026, she competed at the 2026 Judo Grand Prix Linz and won a bronze medal in the –63 kg category, her first career medal on the IJF World Tour. In September 2026, she competed at the 2026 Judo Grand Slam Budapest and won a bronze medal in the –63 kg category, her first career Judo Grand Slam medal. The next month she competed at the 2026 World Judo Championships and advanced to the finals in the –63 kg category. During the final she lost to Haruka Kaju and won a silver medal.

== Personal life ==
Primo's older sister, Gefen, is also a judoka.
