= Kenzo Tagawa =

Japanese judoka

Personal information
- Nationality: Japanese
- Born: 31 October 1996 (age 29)
- Occupation: Judoka

Sport
- Country: Japan
- Sport: Judo
- Weight class: ‍–‍66 kg

Achievements and titles
- Asian Champ.: R16 (2019)
Medal record
Men's judo
Representing Japan
IJF Grand Slam
Gold medal – first place	2018 Düsseldorf	‍–‍66 kg
IJF Grand Prix
Gold medal – first place	2018 Budapest	‍–‍66 kg
Bronze medal – third place	2016 Qingdao	‍–‍66 kg

Profile at external databases
- IJF: 31246
- JudoInside.com: 94276
- Updated on 26 November 2022

Kenzo Tagawa (田川兼三, Tagawa Kenzō; born 31 October 1996) is a Japanese judoka.

Tagawa is the gold medalist of the 2018 Judo Grand Slam Düsseldorf in the ‍–‍66 kg category.
