= Ayşenur Budak =

Turkish judoka (born 2003)

Personal information
- Born: 21 May 2003 (age 23) Kocaeli, Turkey
- Occupation: Judoka

Sport
- Country: Turkey
- Sport: Judo
- Weight class: ‍–‍57 kg
- Club: Kocaeli BB Kağıt Spor

Achievements and titles
- World Champ.: R64 (2026)
- European Champ.: R32 (2026)
Medal record
Women's judo
Representing Turkey
Mediterranean Games
Bronze medal – third place	2026 Taranto	Mixed team

Profile at external databases
- IJF: 43114
- JudoInside.com: 119127
- Updated on 6 October 2026

Ayşenur Budak (born 21 May 2003) is a Turkish female judoka competing in the lightweight (‍–‍57 kg) division. She is a member of Kocaeli BB Kağıt Spor Judo, and represents Turkey at international competitions.

== Sport career ==
Budak pursued her judo career with Kocaeli BB Kağıt Spor. She debuted internationally competing in the –‍52 kg division at the 2018 Antalya Cadets European Cup. She achieved her first notable international success by winning a bronze medal at the European Cadet Cup held in Antalya in 2020. She won the gold medal in the –‍57 kg division at the Turkish Senior Judo Championships in Ankara at the end of 2021. In 2022, she won the gold medal in the –‍57 kg division at the Asian Open tournament in Zouk Mikael, Lebanon. She won a bronze medal at the European Junior Cup in Prague, Czech Republic in 2023. That same year, she was part of the Turkish mixed team at the 2023 European Games in Krynica-Zdrój, Poland. She won a bronze medal at the Senior European Cup in Podgorica, Montenegro, in 2025.

In 2026, she won the silver medal in the –‍57 kg division at the European Open held in Ljubljana, Slovenia. As part of the mixed judo team of Turkey, Budak won the bronze medal in the mixed team event at the 2026 Mediterranean Games in Taranto, Italy.

== Perrsonal life ==
Born on 21 May 2003, Ayşenur Budak is a native of Kocaeli, western Turkey.
