= José Ortega =

José Ortega may refer to:

- José Francisco Ortega (1734–1798), Spanish soldier and explorer with the 1769 Portola expedition
- José Benito Ortega (1858–1941), American sculptor
- José Ortega y Gasset (1883–1955), Spanish philosopher
- José Ortega Spottorno (1916–2002), Spanish journalist and publisher
- José Ortega Torres (1943–2025), Spanish poet, writer, and professor
- José Daniel Ortega (born 1945), Nicaraguan politician
- José Ortega Cano (born 1953), Spanish bullfighter
- José Ortega (boxer) (born 1963), Spanish Olympic boxer
- José Ortega (baseball) (born 1988), Venezuelan baseball pitcher
- José Ortega (footballer) (born 1991), Spanish football goalkeeper
