= Catherine Beauchemin-Pinard =

Canadian judoka (born 1994)

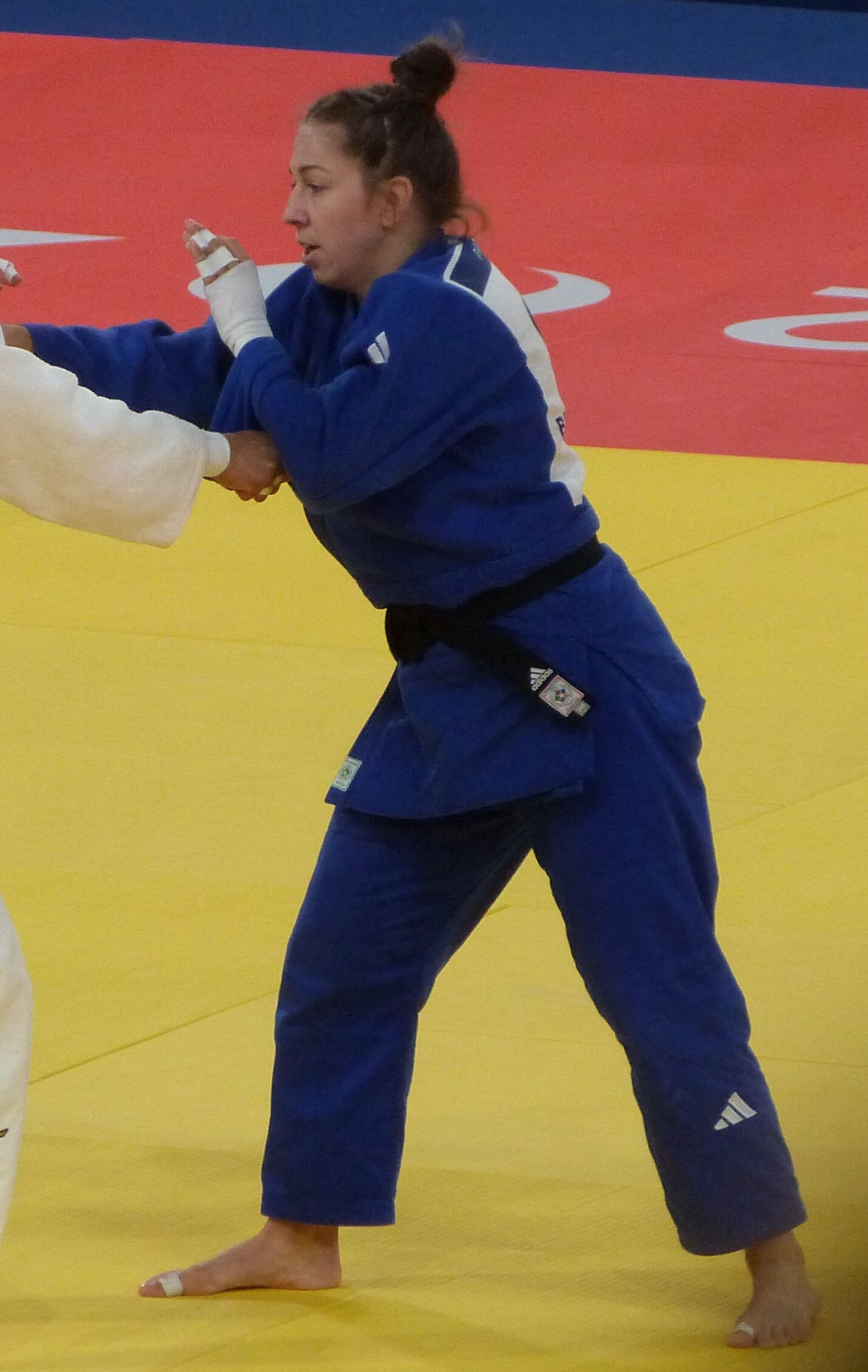
- Beauchemin-Pinard in 2024

Personal information
- Born: 26 June 1994 (age 32) Montreal, Quebec, Canada
- Occupation: Judoka
- Height: 161 cm (5 ft 3 in)

Sport
- Country: Canada
- Sport: Judo
- Weight class: ‍–‍63 kg

Achievements and titles
- Olympic Games: (bronze) (2020)
- World Champ.: (silver) (2022, 2025)
- Pan American Champ.: (2019, 2020)
- Commonwealth Games: (gold) (2022)
- Highest world ranking: 1^{st}
Medal record
Women's judo
Representing Canada
Olympic Games
Bronze medal – third place	2020 Tokyo	‍–‍63 kg
World Championships
Silver medal – second place	2022 Tashkent	‍–‍63 kg
Silver medal – second place	2025 Budapest	‍–‍63 kg
Pan American Games
Silver medal – second place	2015 Toronto	‍–‍57 kg
Pan American Championships
Gold medal – first place	2019 Lima	‍–‍63 kg
Gold medal – first place	2020 Guadalajara	‍–‍63 kg
Silver medal – second place	2016 Havana	‍–‍57 kg
Silver medal – second place	2017 Panama City	‍–‍57 kg
Silver medal – second place	2018 San José	‍–‍63 kg
Silver medal – second place	2022 Lima	‍–‍63 kg
Silver medal – second place	2025 Santiago	‍–‍63 kg
Bronze medal – third place	2015 Edmonton	‍–‍57 kg
Bronze medal – third place	2026 Panama City	‍–‍63 kg
IJF Grand Slam
Gold medal – first place	2014 Tyumen	‍–‍57 kg
Gold medal – first place	2021 Tbilisi	‍–‍63 kg
Gold medal – first place	2023 Tel Aviv	‍–‍63 kg
Gold medal – first place	2023 Abu Dhabi	‍–‍63 kg
Gold medal – first place	2024 Tbilisi	‍–‍63 kg
Gold medal – first place	2025 Tbilisi	‍–‍63 kg
Silver medal – second place	2024 Baku	‍–‍63 kg
Silver medal – second place	2026 Tashkent	‍–‍63 kg
Bronze medal – third place	2015 Tyumen	‍–‍57 kg
Bronze medal – third place	2019 Ekaterinburg	‍–‍63 kg
Bronze medal – third place	2021 Antalya	‍–‍63 kg
Bronze medal – third place	2023 Antalya	‍–‍63 kg
IJF Grand Prix
Gold medal – first place	2014 Ulaanbaatar	‍–‍57 kg
Gold medal – first place	2022 Zagreb	‍–‍63 kg
Silver medal – second place	2018 Cancún	‍–‍63 kg
Silver medal – second place	2020 Tel Aviv	‍–‍63 kg
Bronze medal – third place	2013 Rijeka	‍–‍57 kg
Bronze medal – third place	2017 Tashkent	‍–‍63 kg
Bronze medal – third place	2018 Hohhot	‍–‍63 kg
Bronze medal – third place	2018 Zagreb	‍–‍63 kg
Bronze medal – third place	2019 Montreal	‍–‍63 kg
World Juniors Championships
Silver medal – second place	2013 Ljubljana	‍–‍57 kg
Bronze medal – third place	2014 Fort Lauderdale	‍–‍57 kg
Commonwealth Games
Gold medal – first place	2022 Birmingham	‍–‍63 kg

Profile at external databases
- IJF: 3244
- JudoInside.com: 60741
- Updated on 20 April 2026

Catherine Beauchemin-Pinard (born 26 June 1994) is a Canadian judoka who competes in the women's 63 kg category. Beauchemin-Pinard won a bronze medal in the 63 kg weight class at the 2020 Summer Olympics, making her the second Canadian woman to win a medal in judo at the Summer Olympics. She has been ranked in the top 10 of the world in her weight category.

== Career ==
In June 2016, she was named to Canada's Olympic team.

In 2021, she won one of the bronze medals in her event at the 2021 Judo Grand Slam Antalya held in Antalya, Turkey.

Beauchemin-Pinard competed as part of Canada's 2020 Olympic team in Tokyo. She won all her matches in the under-63 kg class before losing to world champion and eventual Olympic champion Clarisse Agbegnenou in the semifinals. Beauchemin-Pinard then won the bronze medal defeating Anriquelis Barrios by waza-ari in extra time. After her victory she said that,

"I remember going to Rio in 2016 and leaving so disappointed with my performance. I said to myself, I want to go to Tokyo, win a medal and perform there. And I did it."

She won a gold medal at the 2022 Commonwealth Games in Women's 63 kg.

She won a silver medal at the 2022 World Judo Championships.

Beauchemin-Pinard will be the top seeded athlete in her division at the 2024 Summer Olympics.

In November 2025 Beauchemin-Pinard got promoted to 6dan by Judo Canada

== See also ==
- Judo in Quebec
- Judo in Canada
- List of Canadian judoka
