= Kaïla Issoufi =

French judoka (born 2001)

Personal information
- Born: 28 March 2001 (age 25)
- Occupation: Judoka

Sport
- Country: France
- Sport: Judo
- Weight class: ‍–‍78 kg

Achievements and titles
- World Champ.: (silver) (2026)
- European Champ.: (bronze) (2026)
Medal record
Women's judo
Representing France
World Championships
Silver medal – second place	2026 Baku	‍–‍78 kg
European Championships
Bronze medal – third place	2026 Tbilisi	‍–‍78 kg
IJF Grand Slam
Gold medal – first place	2026 Tashkent	‍–‍78 kg
Bronze medal – third place	2025 Dushanbe	‍–‍78 kg
Bronze medal – third place	2025 Abu Dhabi	‍–‍78 kg
Bronze medal – third place	2026 Lausanne	‍–‍78 kg
IJF Grand Prix
Silver medal – second place	2025 Lima	‍–‍78 kg
Bronze medal – third place	2025 Guadalajara	‍–‍78 kg
European U23 Championships
Silver medal – second place	2022 Sarajevo	‍–‍70 kg
World Juniors Championships
Gold medal – first place	2021 Olbia	Mixed team
World University Games
Silver medal – second place	2025 Rhine‑Ruhr	Mixed team

Profile at external databases
- IJF: 43301
- JudoInside.com: 117372
- Updated on 10 October 2026

Kaïla Issoufi (born 28 March 2001) is a French judoka. She won a silver medal at the 2026 World Judo Championships.

== Career ==
In May 2025, Issoufi competed at the 2025 Judo Grand Slam Dushanbe and won a bronze medal in the –78 kg category, her first career Judo Grand Slam medal. In July 2025, she competed at the 2025 Summer World University Games and won a silver medal in the mixed team event.

In March 2026, she competed at the 2026 Judo Grand Slam Tashkent and won her first career Judo Grand Slam gold medal in the –78 kg category. The next month she competed at the 2026 European Judo Championships and won a bronze medal in the –78 kg category in her European Judo Championships debut.

In July 2026, she was selected to compete at the 2026 World Judo Championships. In August 2026, she competed at the 2026 Judo Grand Slam Lausanne and won a bronze medal in the –78 kg category. In October 2026, she made her World Judo Championships debut and won a silver medal in the –78 kg category. During the final she lost to the United Arab Emirates' Yelyzaveta Lytvynenko.
