= Clémence Eme =

French judoka (born 1997)

Personal information
- Born: 24 April 1997 (age 29)
- Occupation: Judoka

Sport
- Country: France
- Sport: Judo
- Weight class: ‍–‍70 kg

Achievements and titles
- World Champ.: R16 (2026)
Medal record
Women's judo
Representing France
World Championships
Silver medal – second place	2021 Budapest	Mixed team
IJF Grand Slam
Gold medal – first place	2026 Astana	‍–‍70 kg
Bronze medal – third place	2026 Tashkent	‍–‍70 kg
Bronze medal – third place	2026 Dushanbe	‍–‍70 kg
IJF Grand Prix
Silver medal – second place	2025 Zagreb	‍–‍70 kg
World Juniors Championships
Bronze medal – third place	2017 Zagreb	‍–‍63 kg

Profile at external databases
- IJF: 21683
- JudoInside.com: 73950
- Updated on 8 October 2026

Clémence Eme (born 24 April 1997) is a French judoka.

Eme won a medal at the 2021 World Judo Championships.
