= Haruka Kaju =

Japanese judoka (born 2000)

Personal information
- Native name: 嘉重 春樺
- Born: 26 February 2000 (age 26)
- Occupation: Judoka

Sport
- Country: Japan
- Sport: Judo
- Weight class: ‍–‍63 kg
- Rank: Black belt

Achievements and titles
- World Champ.: (gold) (2025, 2026)
- Asian Champ.: (gold) (2025)
- Highest world ranking: 1^{st}
Medal record
Women's judo
Representing Japan
World Championships
Gold medal – first place	2025 Budapest	‍–‍63 kg
Gold medal – first place	2026 Baku	‍–‍63 kg
Asian Championships
Gold medal – first place	2025 Bangkok	‍–‍63 kg
IJF Grand Slam
Gold medal – first place	2024 Tokyo	‍–‍63 kg
Gold medal – first place	2025 Paris	‍–‍63 kg
Gold medal – first place	2025 Tokyo	‍–‍63 kg
Gold medal – first place	2026 Tbilisi	‍–‍63 kg
Gold medal – first place	2026 Ulaanbaatar	‍–‍63 kg
IJF Grand Prix
Gold medal – first place	2025 Guadalajara	‍–‍63 kg

Profile at external databases
- IJF: 87228
- JudoInside.com: 115370
- Updated on 7 October 2026

Haruka Kaju (嘉重 春樺, Kaju Haruka; born 26 February 2000) is a Japanese judoka who competes in the women's half-middleweight (63 kg) division. She is a two-time gold medalist at the World Judo Championships, with consecutive titles at 2025 and 2026 editions.
