= Lkhagvatogoogiin Enkhriilen =

Mongolian judoka (born 1998)

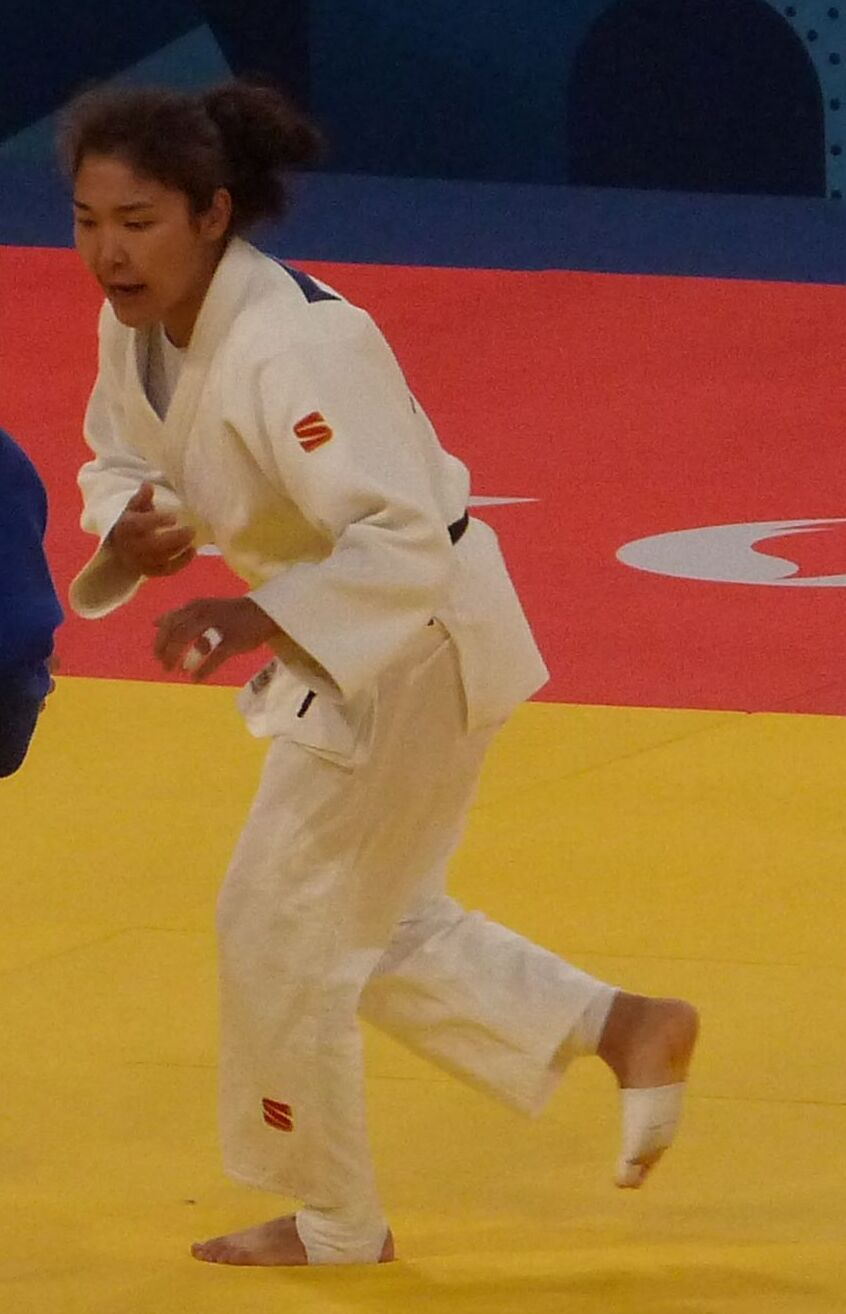

Personal information
- Born: Лхагватогоогийн Энхрийлэн; 28 December 1998 (age 27) Mandal, Selenge, Mongolia
- Occupation: Judoka
- Height: 160 cm (5 ft 3 in)

Sport
- Country: Mongolia
- Sport: Judo
- Weight class: ‍–‍57 kg, ‍–‍63 kg

Achievements and titles
- Olympic Games: 7th (2024)
- World Champ.: (bronze) (2022, 2023, 2026)
- Asian Champ.: (gold) (2024, 2026)
Medal record
Women's judo
Representing Mongolia
World Championships
Bronze medal – third place	2022 Tashkent	‍–‍57 kg
Bronze medal – third place	2023 Doha	‍–‍57 kg
Bronze medal – third place	2026 Baku	‍–‍63 kg
Asian Games
Bronze medal – third place	2023 Hangzhou	Mixed team
Bronze medal – third place	2026 Aichi‑Nagoya	‍–‍63 kg
Asian Championships
Gold medal – first place	2024 Hong Kong	‍–‍57 kg
Gold medal – first place	2026 Ordos	‍–‍63 kg
Silver medal – second place	2025 Bangkok	‍–‍63 kg
Bronze medal – third place	2019 Fujairah	‍–‍57 kg
IJF Grand Slam
Gold medal – first place	2022 Ulaanbaatar	‍–‍57 kg
Gold medal – first place	2026 Astana	‍–‍63 kg
Silver medal – second place	2025 Abu Dhabi	‍–‍63 kg
Silver medal – second place	2026 Paris	‍–‍63 kg
Silver medal – second place	2026 Dushanbe	‍–‍63 kg
Bronze medal – third place	2018 Düsseldorf	‍–‍57 kg
Bronze medal – third place	2021 Abu Dhabi	‍–‍57 kg
Bronze medal – third place	2024 Dushanbe	‍–‍57 kg
Bronze medal – third place	2025 Astana	‍–‍63 kg
IJF Grand Prix
Gold medal – first place	2016 Ulaanbaatar	‍–‍57 kg
Silver medal – second place	2025 Qingdao	‍–‍63 kg
World Juniors Championships
Silver medal – second place	2017 Zagreb	‍–‍57 kg
Asian Cadet Championships
Silver medal – second place	2013 Hainan	‍–‍48 kg

Profile at external databases
- IJF: 25493
- JudoInside.com: 99508
- Updated on 7 October 2026

Lkhagvatogoogiin Enkhriilen (Mongolian: Лхагватогоогийн Энхрийлэн; born 28 December 1998) is a Mongolian judoka.

Lkhagvatogoogiin earned three bronze medals at the World Judo Championships in the ‍–‍57 kg and ‍–‍63 kg events.
