= 2026 World Judo Championships =

Judo competition

2026 Judo World Judo Championships
- Venue: National Gymnastics Arena
- Location: Baku, Azerbaijan
- Dates: 4–11 October 2026
- No. of events: 15 (7 men, 7 women, 1 mixed)
- Competitors: 622 from 93 nations
- Total prize money: €998,000

Competition at external databases
- Links: IJF • JudoInside

The 2026 World Judo Championships was the 39th edition of the men's and 30th edition of the women's World Judo Championships. It was held at the National Gymnastics Arena in Baku, Azerbaijan from 4 to 11 October 2026 as part of the IJF World Tour, concluding with a mixed team event on its eighth and final day.

== Schedule ==
All times are local (UTC+4).

Day	Date	Weight classes		Preliminaries	Final Block
Day	Date	Men	Women	Preliminaries	Final Block
1	4 October	60 kg	48 kg	11:30	18:00
2	5 October	66 kg	52 kg	10:00	18:00
3	6 October	73 kg	57 kg	10:30	18:00
4	7 October	81 kg	63 kg	10:30	18:00
5	8 October	90 kg	70 kg	10:30	18:00
6	9 October	100 kg	78 kg	10:30	18:00
7	10 October	+100 kg	+78 kg	11:30	18:00
8	11 October	Mixed team		9:30	18:00

== Medal summary ==
=== Medal table ===
* Host nation (Azerbaijan)

Rank	Nation	Gold	Silver	Bronze	Total
1	Japan (JPN)	8	2	3	13
2	Georgia (GEO)	2	1	2	5
3	Azerbaijan (AZE)*	1	2	4	7
4	Spain (ESP)	1	2	1	4
5	Russia (RUS)	1	1	4	6
6	United Arab Emirates (UAE)	1	1	0	2
7	South Korea (KOR)	1	0	0	1
8	France (FRA)	0	2	2	4
9	Italy (ITA)	0	1	2	3
10	Israel (ISR)	0	1	1	2
11	Austria (AUT)	0	1	0	1
11	Kazakhstan (KAZ)	0	1	0	1
13	Serbia (SRB)	0	0	3	3
14	Czech Republic (CZE)	0	0	2	2
14	Germany (GER)	0	0	2	2
16	Croatia (CRO)	0	0	1	1
16	Moldova (MDA)	0	0	1	1
16	Mongolia (MGL)	0	0	1	1
16	Uzbekistan (UZB)	0	0	1	1
Totals (19 entries)		15	15	30	60

=== Men's events ===
Event	Gold	Silver	Bronze
Extra-lightweight (−60 kg)	Ahmad Yusifov; Azerbaijan	Sherzod Davlatov; Kazakhstan	Ryuju Nagayama; Japan
Extra-lightweight (−60 kg)	Ahmad Yusifov; Azerbaijan	Sherzod Davlatov; Kazakhstan	Giorgi Sardalashvili; Georgia
Half-lightweight (−66 kg)	Hifumi Abe; Japan	David García Torné; Spain	Denis Vieru; Moldova
Half-lightweight (−66 kg)	Hifumi Abe; Japan	David García Torné; Spain	Takeshi Takeoka; Japan
Lightweight (−73 kg)	Ryuga Tanaka; Japan	Makhmadbek Makhmadbekov; United Arab Emirates	Rashid Mammadaliyev; Azerbaijan
Lightweight (−73 kg)	Ryuga Tanaka; Japan	Makhmadbek Makhmadbekov; United Arab Emirates	Dayyan Boulemtafes; France
Half-middleweight (−81 kg)	Tato Grigalashvili; Georgia	Zelim Tckaev; Azerbaijan	Omar Rajabli; Azerbaijan
Half-middleweight (−81 kg)	Tato Grigalashvili; Georgia	Zelim Tckaev; Azerbaijan	Mihajlo Simin; Serbia
Middleweight (−90 kg)	Sanshiro Murao; Japan	Goki Tajima; Japan	Murad Fatiyev; Azerbaijan
Middleweight (−90 kg)	Sanshiro Murao; Japan	Goki Tajima; Japan	Boris Rutović; Serbia
Half-heavyweight (−100 kg)	Ilia Sulamanidze; Georgia	Dota Arai; Japan	Niyaz Bilalov; Russia
Half-heavyweight (−100 kg)	Ilia Sulamanidze; Georgia	Dota Arai; Japan	Gennaro Pirelli; Italy
Heavyweight (+100 kg)	Inal Tasoev; Russia	Ushangi Kokauri; Azerbaijan	Lukáš Krpálek; Czech Republic
Heavyweight (+100 kg)	Inal Tasoev; Russia	Ushangi Kokauri; Azerbaijan	Kanan Nasibov; Azerbaijan

=== Women's events ===
Event	Gold	Silver	Bronze
Extra-lightweight (−48 kg)	Wakana Koga; Japan	Assunta Scutto; Italy	Shirine Boukli; France
Extra-lightweight (−48 kg)	Wakana Koga; Japan	Assunta Scutto; Italy	Sabina Giliazova; Russia
Half-lightweight (−52 kg)	Uta Abe; Japan	Ariane Toro; Spain	Ayumi Leiva Sánchez; Spain
Half-lightweight (−52 kg)	Uta Abe; Japan	Ariane Toro; Spain	Odette Giuffrida; Italy
Lightweight (−57 kg)	Akari Omori; Japan	Eteri Liparteliani; Georgia	Ana Viktorija Puljiz; Croatia
Lightweight (−57 kg)	Akari Omori; Japan	Eteri Liparteliani; Georgia	Marica Perišić; Serbia
Half-middleweight (−63 kg)	Haruka Kaju; Japan	Kerem Primo; Israel	Renata Zachová; Czech Republic
Half-middleweight (−63 kg)	Haruka Kaju; Japan	Kerem Primo; Israel	Lkhagvatogoogiin Enkhriilen; Mongolia
Middleweight (−70 kg)	Ai Tsunoda; Spain	Michaela Polleres; Austria	Giovanna Scoccimarro; Germany
Middleweight (−70 kg)	Ai Tsunoda; Spain	Michaela Polleres; Austria	Madina Taimazova; Russia
Half-heavyweight (−78 kg)	Yelyzaveta Lytvynenko; United Arab Emirates	Kaïla Issoufi; France	Kurena Ikeda; Japan
Half-heavyweight (−78 kg)	Yelyzaveta Lytvynenko; United Arab Emirates	Kaïla Issoufi; France	Anna Monta Olek; Germany
Heavyweight (+78 kg)	Lee Hyeon-ji; South Korea	Romane Dicko; France	Mariia Ivanova; Russia
Heavyweight (+78 kg)	Lee Hyeon-ji; South Korea	Romane Dicko; France	Raz Hershko; Israel

=== Mixed events ===
Event	Gold	Silver	Bronze
Mixed team	Japan	Russia	Uzbekistan
Mixed team	Japan	Russia	Georgia

== Prize money ==
The sums written are per medalist, bringing the total prizes awarded to €798,000 for the individual events and €200,000 for the team event. (retrieved from:)

Medal	Individual			Mixed team		
Medal	Total	Judoka	Coach	Total	Judoka	Coach
Gold	€26,000	€20,800	€5,200	€90,000	€72,000	€18,000
Silver	€15,000	€12,000	€3,000	€60,000	€48,000	€12,000
Bronze	€8,000	€6,400	€1,600	€25,000	€20,000	€5,000

== Gallery ==
Opening ceremony

Opening ceremony

Opening ceremony

Opening ceremony

Opening ceremony Albano
