= Geke van den Berg =

Dutch judoka

Personal information
- Nationality: Dutch
- Born: 11 June 1995 (age 31) Groesbeek, Netherlands
- Occupation: Judoka

Sport
- Country: Netherlands
- Sport: Judo
- Weight class: –63 kg

Achievements and titles
- World Champ.: R16 (2022)
- European Champ.: 7th (2022)
Medal record
Women's judo
Representing the Netherlands
IJF Grand Slam
Silver medal – second place	2022 Baku	–63 kg
Bronze medal – third place	2021 Tbilisi	–63 kg
IJF Grand Prix
Silver medal – second place	2019 Tbilisi	–63 kg
Silver medal – second place	2021 Zagreb	–63 kg
Bronze medal – third place	2019 Marrakesh	–63 kg
European U23 Championships
Gold medal – first place	2017 Podgorica	–63 kg
European Junior Championships
Bronze medal – third place	2015 Oberwart	–63 kg
Summer Universiade
Silver medal – second place	2019 Naples	–63 kg

Profile at external databases
- IJF: 19954
- JudoInside.com: 56760
- Updated on 5 November 2022

Geke van den Berg (born 11 June 1995) is a Dutch judoka.

She is the silver medallist of the 2019 Judo Grand Prix Tbilisi in the -63 kg category.
