= Renata Zachová =

Czech judoka (born 2000)

Personal information
- Born: 31 May 2000 (age 26) České Budějovice, Czech Republic
- Occupation: Judoka

Sport
- Country: Czech Republic
- Sport: Judo
- Weight class: ‍–‍63 kg

Achievements and titles
- Olympic Games: R32 (2024)
- World Champ.: (bronze) (2026)
- European Champ.: (gold) (2024, 2025)
Medal record
Women's judo
Representing Czech Republic
World Championships
Bronze medal – third place	2026 Baku	‍–‍63 kg
European Championships
Gold medal – first place	2024 Zagreb	‍–‍63 kg
Gold medal – first place	2025 Podgorica	‍–‍63 kg
IJF Grand Slam
Bronze medal – third place	2024 Tokyo	‍–‍63 kg
Bronze medal – third place	2025 Tokyo	‍–‍63 kg
IJF Grand Prix
Silver medal – second place	2022 Perth	‍–‍63 kg
Bronze medal – third place	2020 Tel Aviv	‍–‍63 kg
Bronze medal – third place	2021 Zagreb	‍–‍63 kg
Bronze medal – third place	2022 Almada	‍–‍63 kg
Bronze medal – third place	2025 Linz	‍–‍63 kg
European U23 Championships
Silver medal – second place	2018 Győr	‍–‍63 kg
European Junior Championships
Gold medal – first place	2020 Poreč	‍–‍63 kg
World University Games
Bronze medal – third place	2025 Essen	‍–‍63 kg

Profile at external databases
- IJF: 18150
- JudoInside.com: 94478
- Updated on 7 October 2026

Renata Zachová (born 31 May 2000) is a Czech judoka.

Zachová is a bronze medalist from the 2020 Tel Aviv Grand Prix.

Zachová won one of the bronze medals in her event at the 2022 Almada Grand Prix held in Almada, Portugal.
