= Boldyn Gankhaich =

Mongolian judoka (born 1995)

Personal information
- Born: 22 February 1995 (age 31)
- Occupation: Judoka

Sport
- Country: Mongolia
- Sport: Judo
- Weight class: ‍–‍63 kg

Achievements and titles
- Olympic Games: R16 (2020)
- World Champ.: (bronze) (2025)
- Asian Champ.: (gold) (2022)
Medal record
Women's judo
Representing Mongolia
World Championships
Bronze medal – third place	2025 Budapest	‍–‍63 kg
Asian Championships
Gold medal – first place	2022 Nur‑Sultan	‍–‍63 kg
Silver medal – second place	2019 Fujairah	‍–‍63 kg
Silver medal – second place	2024 Hong Kong	‍–‍63 kg
Bronze medal – third place	2017 Hong Kong	‍–‍63 kg
IJF Grand Slam
Gold medal – first place	2025 Dushanbe	‍–‍63 kg
Gold medal – first place	2025 Ulaanbaatar	‍–‍63 kg
Gold medal – first place	2026 Dushanbe	‍–‍63 kg
Silver medal – second place	2021 Baku	‍–‍63 kg
Bronze medal – third place	2018 Düsseldorf	‍–‍63 kg
Bronze medal – third place	2019 Ekaterinburg	‍–‍63 kg
Bronze medal – third place	2020 Düsseldorf	‍–‍63 kg
Bronze medal – third place	2024 Paris	‍–‍63 kg
IJF Grand Prix
Silver medal – second place	2016 Ulaanbaatar	‍–‍63 kg
Bronze medal – third place	2018 Hohhot	‍–‍63 kg
Bronze medal – third place	2022 Zagreb	‍–‍63 kg
Asian Junior Championships
Gold medal – first place	2013 Hainan	‍–‍63 kg
Silver medal – second place	2012 Taipei	‍–‍63 kg
Asian Cadet Championships
Gold medal – first place	2010 Bangkok	‍–‍52 kg

Profile at external databases
- IJF: 8325
- JudoInside.com: 76218
- Updated on 2 May 2026

Boldyn Gankhaich (Mongolian: Болдын Ганхайч; born 22 February 1995) is a Mongolian judoka. She competed in the women's 63 kg event at the 2020 Summer Olympics held in Tokyo, Japan.

Boldyn is the 2019 Asian-Pacific Judo Championships silver medalist in the ‍–‍63 kg class.
