= 2023 European Judo Championships – Women's 48 kg =

Judo competition

Judo Women's 48 kg at the 2023 European Judo Championships
- Venue: Sud de France Arena
- Location: Montpellier, France
- Date: 3 November
- Competitors: 22 from 15 nations

Medalists
gold medal	Shirine Boukli (3rd title)	France
silver medal	Catarina Costa	Portugal
bronze medal	Laura Martínez	Spain
bronze medal	Sabina Giliazova

Competition at external databases
- Links: IJF • JudoInside

The women's 48 kg competition at the 2023 European Judo Championships was held on 3 November at the Sud de France Arena.

== Results ==
=== Finals ===
Semi-finals
Maruša Štangar (SLO)	00 (yellow card)
Catarina Costa (POR)	01 (yellow card)
Shirine Boukli (FRA)	10
Mireia Lapuerta Comas (ESP)	00

Final
Catarina Costa (POR)	01 (yellow card)
Shirine Boukli (FRA)	02 (yellow card)

=== Repechage ===
Repechage
Leyla Aliyeva (AZE)	00
Laura Martínez (ESP)	10
Sabina Giliazova (AIN)	10 (yellow card)
Tara Babulfath (SWE)	00

Bronze medal
Laura Martínez (ESP)	01
Mireia Lapuerta Comas (ESP)	00
Sabina Giliazova (AIN)	10
Maruša Štangar (SLO)	00 (yellow card)

=== Pool A ===
First round
Leyla Aliyeva (AZE)	10 (yellow card)
Loïs Petit (BEL)	00
Maruša Štangar (SLO)	10
Andrea Stojadinov (SRB)	00

Round of 16
Assunta Scutto (ITA)	00
Leyla Aliyeva (AZE)	01
Shira Rishony (ISR)	00
Maruša Štangar (SLO)	02 (yellow card)

Quarter-finals
Leyla Aliyeva (AZE)	00
Maruša Štangar (SLO)	10 (yellow card)

=== Pool B ===
First round
Kristina Dudina (AIN)	10
Merve Azak (TUR)	00

Round of 16
Catarina Costa (POR)	10 (yellow card)
Katharina Tanzer (AUT)	00 (yellow card)
Laura Martínez (ESP)	01
Kristina Dudina (AIN)	00

Quarter-finals
Catarina Costa (POR)	01
Laura Martínez (ESP)	00

=== Pool C ===
First round
Tamar Malca (ISR)	10
Tuğçe Beder (TUR)	00
Tereza Bodnárová (CZE)	00 (yellow card)
Sabina Giliazova (AIN)	01 (yellow card)

Round of 16
Shirine Boukli (FRA)	10
Tamar Malca (ISR)	00 (yellow card)
Francesca Milani (ITA)	00 (yellow card)
Sabina Giliazova (AIN)	01

Quarter-finals
Shirine Boukli (FRA)	01 (yellow card)
Sabina Giliazova (AIN)	00

=== Pool D ===
First round
Ellen Salens (BEL)	00 (yellow card)
Katharina Menz (GER)	01 (yellow card)

Round of 16
Milica Nikolić (SRB)	00 (yellow card)
Tara Babulfath (SWE)	01 (yellow card)
Mireia Lapuerta Comas (ESP)	10 (yellow card)
Katharina Menz (GER)	00

Quarter-finals
Tara Babulfath (SWE)	00 (yellow card)
Mireia Lapuerta Comas (ESP)	01 (yellow card)
