= 2024 European Judo Championships – Women's 48 kg =

Judo competition

Judo Women's 48 kg at the 2024 European Judo Championships
- Venue: Arena Zagreb
- Location: Zagreb, Croatia
- Date: 25 April
- Competitors: 22 from 15 nations

Medalists
gold medal	Kristina Dudina (1st title)
silver medal	Blandine Pont	France
bronze medal	Tamar Malca	Israel
bronze medal	Catarina Costa	Portugal

Competition at external databases
- Links: IJF • JudoInside

The women's 48 kg competition at the 2024 European Judo Championships was held on 25 April at the Arena Zagreb.

== Results ==
=== Finals ===
Semi-finals
Milica Nikolić (SRB)	00
Blandine Pont (FRA)	01
Kristina Dudina (AIN)	10
Tamar Malca (ISR)	00

Final
Blandine Pont (FRA)	00
Kristina Dudina (AIN)	02

=== Repechage ===
Repechage
Francesca Milani (ITA)	00
Tuğçe Beder (TUR)	11
Ellen Salens (BEL)	00
Catarina Costa (POR)	01 (yellow card)

Bronze medal
Tuğçe Beder (TUR)	01 (yellow card)
Tamar Malca (ISR)	11
Catarina Costa (POR)	01
Milica Nikolić (SRB)	00 (yellow card)

=== Pool A ===
First round
Katryna Esposito (MLT)	00
Tara Babulfath (SWE)	10
Shira Rishony (ISR)	10
Raquel Brito (POR)	00

Round of 16
Milica Nikolić (SRB)	01
Tara Babulfath (SWE)	00
Francesca Milani (ITA)	11 (yellow card)
Shira Rishony (ISR)	00

Quarter-finals
Milica Nikolić (SRB)	10
Francesca Milani (ITA)	00

=== Pool B ===
First round
Leyla Aliyeva (AZE)	00
Tuğçe Beder (TUR)	10 (yellow card)

Round of 16
Sabina Giliazova (AIN)	00
Tuğçe Beder (TUR)	10 (yellow card)
Blandine Pont (FRA)	10 (yellow card)
Loïs Petit (BEL)	00

Quarter-finals
Tuğçe Beder (TUR)	00
Blandine Pont (FRA)	10

=== Pool C ===
First round
Ellen Salens (BEL)	10
Katharina Tanzer (AUT)	00

Round of 16
Laura Martínez (ESP)	00 (yellow card)
Kristina Dudina (AIN)	01
Maruša Štangar (SLO)	00
Ellen Salens (BEL)	10

Quarter-finals
Kristina Dudina (AIN)	10 (yellow card)
Ellen Salens (BEL)	00 (yellow card)

=== Pool D ===
First round
Andrea Stojadinov (SRB)	10
Maria Gogua (GRE)	00
Tamar Malca (ISR)	01
Sıla Ersin (TUR)	00 (yellow card)

Round of 16
Catarina Costa (POR)	10 (yellow card)
Andrea Stojadinov (SRB)	00
Mireia Lapuerta Comas (ESP)	00
Tamar Malca (ISR)	10

Quarter-finals
Catarina Costa (POR)	00
Tamar Malca (ISR)	10 (yellow card)
