= Judo Grand Slam Tel Aviv =

Judo competition

The IJF World Tour tournament in Tel Aviv is an international judo competition held since 2019 at the Drive in Arena in Tel Aviv, as part of the International Judo Federation Grand Slam series. Being held as a Grand Prix for the inaugural two years, the tournament was elevated to a Grand Slam in 2021.

== Venues ==
- Drive in Arena (2019-)

== Past winners ==
=== Men's ===
Year	Class	-60 kg	-66 kg	-73 kg	-81 kg	-90 kg	-100 kg	+100 kg	Ref.
2019	Grand Prix	(Belgium) Jorre Verstraeten	(Italy) Manuel Lombardo	(Belarus) Vadzim Shoka	(Israel) Sagi Muki	(France) Axel Clerget	(France) Alexandre Iddir	(Israel) Or Sasson	
2020	Grand Prix	(South Korea) Kim Won-jin	(South Korea) An Ba-ul	(Italy) Fabio Basile	(Russia) Aslan Lappinagov	(South Korea) Gwak Dong-han	(Israel) Peter Paltchik	(Israel) Or Sasson	
2021	Grand Slam	(Azerbaijan) Davud Mammadsoy	(Spain) Alberto Gaitero	(Romania) Alexandru Raicu	(Uzbekistan) Sharofiddin Boltaboev	(Georgia (country)) Lasha Bekauri	(Netherlands) Michael Korrel	(Georgia (country)) Gela Zaalishvili	
2022	Grand Slam	(Ukraine) Artem Lesiuk	(Israel) Baruch Shmailov	(Azerbaijan) Hidayat Heydarov	(Belgium) Matthias Casse	(Azerbaijan) Mammadali Mehdiyev	(Georgia (country)) Ilia Sulamanidze	(Georgia (country)) Guram Tushishvili	
2023	Grand Slam	(France) Luka Mkheidze	(Georgia (country)) Vazha Margvelashvili	(Switzerland) Nils Stump	(Israel) Sagi Muki	(Georgia (country)) Beka Gviniashvili	(Azerbaijan) Zelym Kotsoiev	(Mongolia) Odkhüügiin Tsetsentsengel	

=== Women's ===
Year	Class	-48 kg	-52 kg	-57 kg	-63 kg	-70 kg	-78 kg	+78 kg	Ref.
2019	Grand Prix	(Israel) Shira Rishony	(Kosovo) Majlinda Kelmendi	(Israel) Timna Nelson-Levy	(Italy) Maria Centracchio	(Sweden) Anna Bernholm	(Slovenia) Klara Apotekar	(Azerbaijan) Iryna Kindzerska	
2020	Grand Prix	(Japan) Natsumi Tsunoda	(Japan) Chishima Maeda	(Slovenia) Kaja Kajzer	(Australia) Katharina Haecker	(United Kingdom) Sally Conway	(United Kingdom) Natalie Powell	(France) Romane Dicko	
2021	Grand Slam	(France) Shirine Boukli	(United Kingdom) Chelsie Giles	(Israel) Timna Nelson-Levy	(Slovenia) Tina Trstenjak	(France) Margaux Pinot	(Germany) Anna-Maria Wagner	(France) Romane Dicko	
2022	Grand Slam	(France) Shirine Boukli	(France) Astride Gneto	(France) Priscilla Gneto	(Japan) Megumi Horikawa	(Japan) Shiho Tanaka	(Poland) Beata Pacut	(France) Romane Dicko	
2023	Grand Slam	(France) Blandine Pont	(United Kingdom) Chelsie Giles	(Canada) Jessica Klimkait	(Canada) Catherine Beauchemin-Pinard	(France) Margaux Pinot	(Italy) Alice Bellandi	(Israel) Raz Hershko	
