= Judo at the 2019 European Games – Women's 48 kg =

Judo competition

Judo Women's 48 kg at the 2019 European Games
- Venue: Čyžoŭka-Arena
- Location: Minsk, Belarus
- Date: 22 June
- Competitors: 21 from 15 nations

Medalists
gold medal	Daria Bilodid (2nd title)	Ukraine
silver medal	Irina Dolgova	Russia
bronze medal	Julia Figueroa	Spain
bronze medal	Maruša Štangar	Slovenia

Competition at external databases
- Links: IJF • JudoInside

The women's 48 kg judo event at the 2019 European Games in Minsk was held on 22 June at the Čyžoŭka-Arena.

== Results ==
=== Final ===
Final
Daria Bilodid (UKR)	01
Irina Dolgova (RUS)	00

=== Repechage ===
Repechage
Mélanie Clément (FRA)	00
Julia Figueroa (ESP)	01

Third place
Julia Figueroa (ESP)	01
Catarina Costa (POR)	00

Repechage
Laura Martínez (ESP)	00
Maruša Štangar (SLO)	01

Third place
Maruša Štangar (SLO)	01
Milica Nikolić (SRB)	00

=== Top half ===
Round of 32
Éva Csernoviczki (HUN)	10
Shira Rishony (ISR)	00
Maria Siderot (POR)	01
Katharina Menz (GER)	00
Aisha Gurbanli (AZE)	10
Alexandra Pop (ROU)	01

Round of 16
Daria Bilodid (UKR)	10
Éva Csernoviczki (HUN)	00
Mélanie Clément (FRA)	10
Francesca Giorda (ITA)	00
Milica Nikolić (SRB)	10
Maria Siderot (POR)	00
Julia Figueroa (ESP)	10
Aisha Gurbanli (AZE)	00

Quarterfinals
Daria Bilodid (UKR)	10
Mélanie Clément (FRA)	00
Milica Nikolić (SRB)	01
Julia Figueroa (ESP)	00

Semifinals
Daria Bilodid (UKR)	10
Milica Nikolić (SRB)	01

=== Bottom half ===
Round of 32
Maryna Cherniak (UKR)	00
Laura Martínez (ESP)	10
Francesca Milani (ITA)	10
Gülkader Şentürk (TUR)	00
Andrea Stojadinov (SRB)	01
Monica Ungureanu (ROU)	00

Round of 16
~~Distria Krasniqi (KOS)~~
Laura Martínez (ESP)	WO
Catarina Costa (POR)	10
Katharina Tanzer (AUT)	00
Irina Dolgova (RUS)	10
Francesca Milani (ITA)	00
Maruša Štangar (SLO)	10
Andrea Stojadinov (SRB)	00

Quarterfinals
Laura Martínez (ESP)	00
Catarina Costa (POR)	01
Irina Dolgova (RUS)	10
Maruša Štangar (SLO)	00

Semifinals
Catarina Costa (POR)	00
Irina Dolgova (RUS)	01
