= 2021 European Judo Championships – Women's 48 kg =

Judo Women's 48 kg at the 2021 European Judo Championships
- Venue: Altice Arena
- Location: Lisbon, Portugal
- Date: 16 April
- Competitors: 21 from 15 nations

Medalists
gold medal	Distria Krasniqi (1st title)	Kosovo
silver medal	Daria Bilodid	Ukraine
bronze medal	Mélanie Clément	France
bronze medal	Sabina Giliazova	Russia

Competition at external databases
- Links: IJF • JudoInside

The women's 48 kg competition at the 2021 European Judo Championships was held on 16 April at the Altice Arena.

== Results ==
=== Final ===
Final
Distria Krasniqi (KOS)	10
Daria Bilodid (UKR)	00

=== Repechage ===
Repechage
Shira Rishony (ISR)	00
Mélanie Clément (FRA)	10

Third place
Mélanie Clément (FRA)	10
Irina Dolgova (RUS)	00

Repechage
Maruša Štangar (SLO)	10
Julia Figueroa (ESP)	00

Third place
Maruša Štangar (SLO)	00
Sabina Giliazova (RUS)	10

=== Top half ===
Round of 32
Francesca Giorda (ITA)	10
Ana Budescu (MDA)	00
Sabina Giliazova (RUS)	10
Ellen Salens (BEL)	00

Round of 16
Distria Krasniqi (KOS)	10
Francesca Giorda (ITA)	00
Laura Martínez (ESP)	00
Shira Rishony (ISR)	10
Mélanie Clément (FRA)	01
Ebru Şahin (TUR)	00
Catarina Costa (POR)	00
Sabina Giliazova (RUS)	10

Quarterfinals
Distria Krasniqi (KOS)	10
Shira Rishony (ISR)	00
Mélanie Clément (FRA)	00
Sabina Giliazova (RUS)	10

Semifinals
Distria Krasniqi (KOS)	10
Sabina Giliazova (RUS)	00

=== Bottom half ===
Round of 32
Francesca Milani (ITA)	10
Gül Kader Şentürk (TUR)	00
Anne-Sophie Jura (BEL)	10
Katryna Esposito (MLT)	00
Milica Nikolić (SRB)	00
Monica Ungureanu (ROU)	11

Round of 16
Daria Bilodid (UKR)	10
Francesca Milani (ITA)	00
Maruša Štangar (SLO)	10
Maria Siderot (POR)	00
Julia Figueroa (ESP)	01
Anne-Sophie Jura (BEL)	00
Irina Dolgova (RUS)	10
Monica Ungureanu (ROU)	00

Quarterfinals
Daria Bilodid (UKR)	10
Maruša Štangar (SLO)	00
Julia Figueroa (ESP)	00
Irina Dolgova (RUS)	11

Semifinals
Daria Bilodid (UKR)	10
Irina Dolgova (RUS)	00
