= 2020 European Judo Championships – Women's 48 kg =

Judo competition

Judo Women's 48 kg at the 2020 European Judo Championships
- Venue: O2 Arena
- Location: Prague, Czech Republic
- Date: 19 November
- Competitors: 19 from 12 nations

Medalists
| gold medal | Shirine Boukli (1st title) | France |
| silver medal | Andrea Stojadinov | Serbia |
| bronze medal | Distria Krasniqi | Kosovo |
| bronze medal | Katharina Menz | Germany |

Competition at external databases
- Links: IJF • JudoInside

The women's 48 kg competition at the 2020 European Judo Championships was held on 19 November at the O2 Arena.

== Results ==
=== Final ===
| Final |
| Shirine Boukli (FRA) | 10 |
| Andrea Stojadinov (SRB) | 00 |

=== Repechage ===
Repechage
Distria Krasniqi (KOS) | 01
Irina Dolgova (RUS) | 00

Third place
Distria Krasniqi (KOS) | 10
Mélanie Clément (FRA) | 00

Repechage
Katharina Menz (GER) | 10
Mireia Lapuerta (ESP) | 00

Third place
Katharina Menz (GER) | 01
Laura Martínez (ESP) | 00

=== Top half ===
Round of 32
Anne-Sophie Jura (BEL) | 01
Francesca Milani (ITA) | 00

Round of 16
Distria Krasniqi (KOS) | 11
Aisha Gurbanli (AZE) | 01
Shirine Boukli (FRA) | 10
Anne-Sophie Jura (BEL) | 00
Laura Martínez (ESP) | 10
Raquel Brito (POR) | 00
Irina Dolgova (RUS) | 10
Milica Nikolić (SRB) | 00

Quarterfinals
Distria Krasniqi (KOS) | 00
Shirine Boukli (FRA) | 10
Laura Martínez (ESP) | 10
Irina Dolgova (RUS) | 00

Semifinals
Shirine Boukli (FRA) | 01
Laura Martínez (ESP) | 00

=== Bottom half ===
Round of 32
Francesca Giorda (ITA) | 10
Gül Kader Şentürk (TUR) | 00
Ellen Salens (BEL) | 00
Mireia Lapuerta (ESP) | 01

Round of 16
Mélanie Clément (FRA) | 01
Francesca Giorda (ITA) | 00
Katharina Menz (GER) | 10
Leyla Aliyeva (AZE) | 00
Catarina Costa (POR) | 00
Mireia Lapuerta (ESP) | 10
Maruša Štangar (SLO) | 00
Andrea Stojadinov (SRB) | 10

Quarterfinals
Mélanie Clément (FRA) | 01
Katharina Menz (GER) | 00
Mireia Lapuerta (ESP) | 00
Andrea Stojadinov (SRB) | 01

Semifinals
Mélanie Clément (FRA) | 00
Andrea Stojadinov (SRB) | 11
