= 2025 European Judo Championships – Women's 48 kg =

Judo competition

Judo Women's 48 kg at the 2025 European Judo Championships
- Venue: Morača Sports Center
- Location: Podgorica, Montenegro
- Date: 23 April 2025
- Competitors: 20 from 19 nations

Medalists
gold medal	Shirine Boukli (4th title)	France
silver medal	Catarina Costa	Portugal
bronze medal	Assunta Scutto	Italy
bronze medal	Andrea Stojadinov	Serbia

Competition at external databases
- Links: IJF • JudoInside

The women's 48 kg competition at the 2025 European Judo Championships was held at the Morača Sports Center in Podgorica, Montenegro on 23 April 2025.

== Results ==
=== Finals ===
Semi-finals
(Serbia) Andrea Stojadinov	000
(Portugal) Catarina Costa	001
(Italy) Assunta Scutto	000
(France) Shirine Boukli	010 (yellow card)

Final
(Portugal) Catarina Costa	001
(France) Shirine Boukli	101

=== Repechage ===
Repechage
(Spain) Eva Pérez Soler	000
(Netherlands) Amber Gersjes	100
(Turkey) Tuğçe Beder	000 (yellow card)
(Spain) Laura Martínez	001

Bronze medal
(Netherlands) Amber Gersjes	000
(Italy) Assunta Scutto	110
(Spain) Laura Martínez	000
(Serbia) Andrea Stojadinov	100

=== Pool A ===
First round
(Hungary) Szabina Szeleczki	000 (yellow card)
(Spain) Eva Pérez Soler	001

Round of 16
(Sweden) Tara Babulfath	000
(Spain) Eva Pérez Soler	100 (yellow card)
(Serbia) Andrea Stojadinov	100
(Belgium) Loïs Petit	000

Quarter-finals
(Spain) Eva Pérez Soler	000
(Serbia) Andrea Stojadinov	001

=== Pool B ===
First round
(Austria) Jacqueline Springer	000
(Netherlands) Amber Gersjes	100

Round of 16
(International Judo Federation) Sabina Giliazova	000
(Netherlands) Amber Gersjes	001
(Portugal) Catarina Costa	100 (yellow card)
(Slovakia) Patrícia Tománková	000

Quarter-finals
(Netherlands) Amber Gersjes	000
(Portugal) Catarina Costa	100

=== Pool C ===
First round
(Azerbaijan) Konul Aliyeva	021 (yellow card)
(Poland) Paulina Szlachta	000 (yellow card)

Round of 16
(Italy) Assunta Scutto	100
(Malta) Katryna Esposito	000
(Turkey) Tuğçe Beder	100
(Azerbaijan) Konul Aliyeva	001

Quarter-finals
(Italy) Assunta Scutto	001
(Turkey) Tuğçe Beder	000 (yellow card)

=== Pool D ===
First round
(Georgia (country)) Julieta Rodonaia	000 (yellow card)
(International Judo Federation) Marina Vorobeva	001

Round of 16
(France) Shirine Boukli	001
(International Judo Federation) Marina Vorobeva	000
(Spain) Laura Martínez	001 (yellow card)
(Germany) Sarah Ischt	000

Quarter-finals
(France) Shirine Boukli	100 (yellow card)
(Spain) Laura Martínez	000
