= 2020 Judo Grand Prix Tel Aviv =

Judo competition

Judo 2020 Judo Grand Prix Tel Aviv
- Venue: Drive in Arena
- Location: Tel Aviv, Israel
- Dates: 23–25 January 2020
- Competitors: 545 from 83 nations

Competition at external databases
- Links: IJF • EJU • JudoInside

The 2020 Judo Grand Prix Tel Aviv was held in Tel Aviv, Israel, from 23 to 25 January 2020.

== Medal summary ==
=== Men's events ===
Event	Gold	Silver	Bronze
Extra-lightweight (−60 kg)	Kim Won-jin (KOR)	Mihraç Akkuş (TUR)	Nicolae Foca (MDA)
Extra-lightweight (−60 kg)	Kim Won-jin (KOR)	Mihraç Akkuş (TUR)	Dai Aoki (JPN)
Half-lightweight (−66 kg)	An Ba-ul (KOR)	Yerlan Serikzhanov (KAZ)	Daniel Cargnin (BRA)
Half-lightweight (−66 kg)	An Ba-ul (KOR)	Yerlan Serikzhanov (KAZ)	Tal Flicker (ISR)
Lightweight (−73 kg)	Fabio Basile (ITA)	Ferdinand Karapetian (ARM)	Nils Stump (SUI)
Lightweight (−73 kg)	Fabio Basile (ITA)	Ferdinand Karapetian (ARM)	Martin Hojak (SLO)
Half-middleweight (−81 kg)	Aslan Lappinagov (RUS)	Alexios Ntanatsidis (GRE)	Eduardo Yudy Santos (BRA)
Half-middleweight (−81 kg)	Aslan Lappinagov (RUS)	Alexios Ntanatsidis (GRE)	Luka Maisuradze (GEO)
Middleweight (−90 kg)	Gwak Dong-han (KOR)	Mihael Žgank (TUR)	Piotr Kuczera (POL)
Middleweight (−90 kg)	Gwak Dong-han (KOR)	Mihael Žgank (TUR)	Rafael Macedo (BRA)
Half-heavyweight (−100 kg)	Peter Paltchik (ISR)	Leonardo Gonçalves (BRA)	Rafael Buzacarini (BRA)
Half-heavyweight (−100 kg)	Peter Paltchik (ISR)	Leonardo Gonçalves (BRA)	Karl-Richard Frey (GER)
Heavyweight (+100 kg)	Or Sasson (ISR)	Kim Sung-min (KOR)	Iakiv Khammo (UKR)
Heavyweight (+100 kg)	Or Sasson (ISR)	Kim Sung-min (KOR)	Yūsuke Kumashiro (JPN)

=== Women's events ===
Event	Gold	Silver	Bronze
Extra-lightweight (−48 kg)	Natsumi Tsunoda (JPN)	Shirine Boukli (FRA)	Mélanie Clément (FRA)
Extra-lightweight (−48 kg)	Natsumi Tsunoda (JPN)	Shirine Boukli (FRA)	Tuğçe Beder (TUR)
Half-lightweight (−52 kg)	Chishima Maeda (JPN)	Jeong Bo-kyeong (KOR)	Park Da-sol (KOR)
Half-lightweight (−52 kg)	Chishima Maeda (JPN)	Jeong Bo-kyeong (KOR)	Charline Van Snick (BEL)
Lightweight (−57 kg)	Kaja Kajzer (SLO)	Hélène Receveaux (FRA)	Nora Gjakova (KOS)
Lightweight (−57 kg)	Kaja Kajzer (SLO)	Hélène Receveaux (FRA)	Hedvig Karakas (HUN)
Half-middleweight (−63 kg)	Katharina Haecker (AUS)	Catherine Beauchemin-Pinard (CAN)	Martyna Trajdos (GER)
Half-middleweight (−63 kg)	Katharina Haecker (AUS)	Catherine Beauchemin-Pinard (CAN)	Renata Zachová (CZE)
Middleweight (−70 kg)	Sally Conway (GBR)	Kim Seong-yeon (KOR)	Kelita Zupancic (CAN)
Middleweight (−70 kg)	Sally Conway (GBR)	Kim Seong-yeon (KOR)	Ai Tsunoda (ESP)
Half-heavyweight (−78 kg)	Natalie Powell (GBR)	Bernadette Graf (AUT)	Patrícia Sampaio (POR)
Half-heavyweight (−78 kg)	Natalie Powell (GBR)	Bernadette Graf (AUT)	Yoon Hyun-ji (KOR)
Heavyweight (+78 kg)	Romane Dicko (FRA)	Tessie Savelkouls (NED)	Rochele Nunes (POR)
Heavyweight (+78 kg)	Romane Dicko (FRA)	Tessie Savelkouls (NED)	Kayra Sayit (TUR)

Source Results

=== Medal table ===
* Host nation (Israel)

Rank	Nation	Gold	Silver	Bronze	Total
1	South Korea (KOR)	3	3	2	8
2	Japan (JPN)	2	0	2	4
3	Israel (ISR)*	2	0	1	3
4	Great Britain (GBR)	2	0	0	2
5	France (FRA)	1	2	1	4
6	Slovenia (SLO)	1	0	1	2
7	Australia (AUS)	1	0	0	1
7	Italy (ITA)	1	0	0	1
7	Russia (RUS)	1	0	0	1
10	Turkey (TUR)	0	2	2	4
11	Brazil (BRA)	0	1	4	5
12	Canada (CAN)	0	1	1	2
13	Armenia (ARM)	0	1	0	1
13	Austria (AUT)	0	1	0	1
13	Greece (GRE)	0	1	0	1
13	Kazakhstan (KAZ)	0	1	0	1
13	Netherlands (NED)	0	1	0	1
18	Germany (GER)	0	0	2	2
18	Portugal (POR)	0	0	2	2
20	Belgium (BEL)	0	0	1	1
20	Czech Republic (CZE)	0	0	1	1
20	Georgia (GEO)	0	0	1	1
20	Hungary (HUN)	0	0	1	1
20	Kosovo (KOS)	0	0	1	1
20	Moldova (MDA)	0	0	1	1
20	Poland (POL)	0	0	1	1
20	Spain (ESP)	0	0	1	1
20	Switzerland (SUI)	0	0	1	1
20	Ukraine (UKR)	0	0	1	1
Totals (29 entries)		14	14	28	56
