= Shirine Boukli =

French judoka (born 1999)

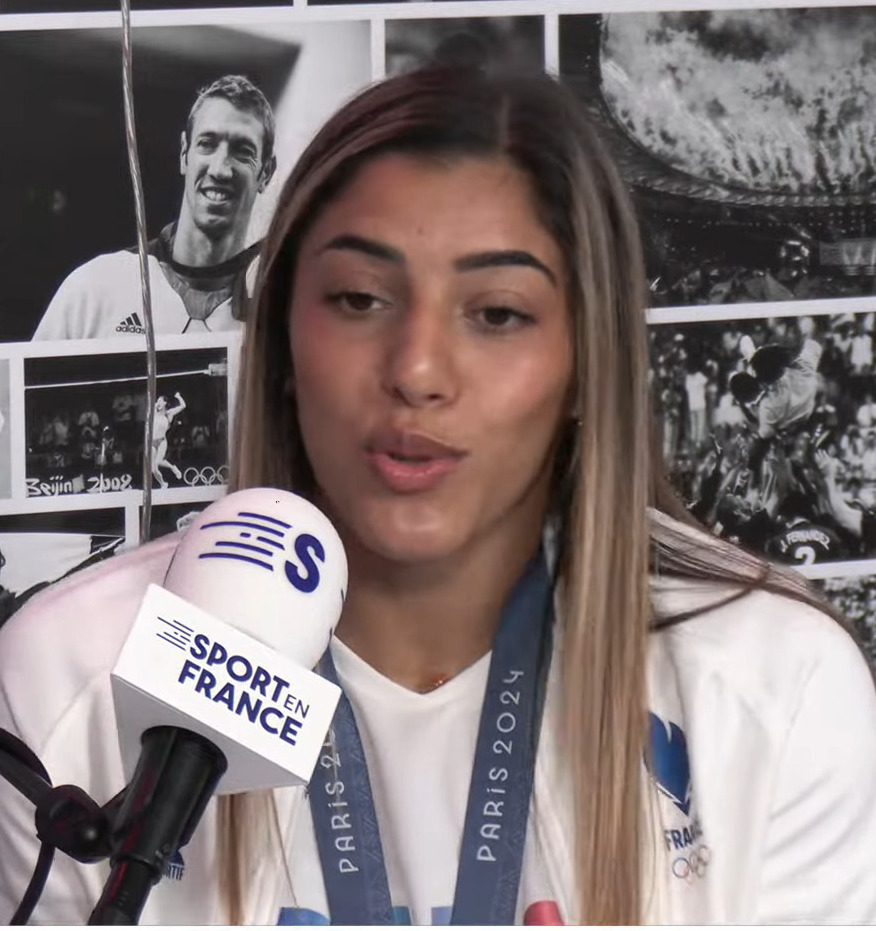
- Boukli in 2024

Personal information
- Born: 24 January 1999 (age 27) Aramon, Gard, France
- Education: Emlyon Business School
- Occupation: Judoka
- Height: 156 cm (5 ft 1 in)

Sport
- Country: France
- Sport: Judo
- Weight class: ‍–‍48 kg
- Club: FLAM91
- Coached by: Guy Le Baupin

Achievements and titles
- Olympic Games: (bronze) (2024)
- World Champ.: (silver) (2023)
- European Champ.: (gold) (2020, 2022, 2023, 2025, 2026)
- Highest world ranking: 1^{st}
Medal record
Women's judo
Representing France
Olympic Games
Gold medal – first place	2024 Paris	Mixed team
Bronze medal – third place	2024 Paris	‍–‍48 kg
World Championships
Silver medal – second place	2023 Doha	‍–‍48 kg
Bronze medal – third place	2026 Baku	‍–‍48 kg
European Championships
Gold medal – first place	2020 Prague	‍–‍48 kg
Gold medal – first place	2022 Sofia	‍–‍48 kg
Gold medal – first place	2023 Montpellier	‍–‍48 kg
Gold medal – first place	2025 Podgorica	‍–‍48 kg
Gold medal – first place	2026 Tbilisi	‍–‍48 kg
World Masters
Gold medal – first place	2022 Jerusalem	‍–‍48 kg
IJF Grand Slam
Gold medal – first place	2020 Düsseldorf	‍–‍48 kg
Gold medal – first place	2021 Tel Aviv	‍–‍48 kg
Gold medal – first place	2022 Tel Aviv	‍–‍48 kg
Gold medal – first place	2022 Baku	‍–‍48 kg
Gold medal – first place	2024 Paris	‍–‍48 kg
Gold medal – first place	2026 Paris	‍–‍48 kg
Silver medal – second place	2021 Abu Dhabi	‍–‍48 kg
Silver medal – second place	2025 Paris	‍–‍48 kg
Bronze medal – third place	2021 Paris	‍–‍48 kg
Bronze medal – third place	2023 Baku	‍–‍48 kg
Bronze medal – third place	2024 Astana	‍–‍48 kg
Bronze medal – third place	2025 Tbilisi	‍–‍48 kg
IJF Grand Prix
Silver medal – second place	2020 Tel Aviv	‍–‍48 kg
Bronze medal – third place	2025 Qingdao	‍–‍48 kg
World Juniors Championships
Silver medal – second place	2019 Marrakesh	‍–‍48 kg
European Junior Championships
Silver medal – second place	2019 Vantaa	‍–‍48 kg

Profile at external databases
- IJF: 19526
- JudoInside.com: 40767
- Updated on 4 October 2026

Shirine Boukli (born 24 January 1999) is a French judoka. She won one of the bronze medals in the women's 48 kg event at the 2024 Summer Olympics held in Paris, France. In 2023, she won the silver medal in the women's 48 kg event at the World Judo Championships held in Doha, Qatar. And the gold medal in the women's 48 kg event at the European Judo Championships in 2020, 2022 and 2023.

== Career ==
In January 2020, Boukli won the silver medal in the women's 48 kg event at the Judo Grand Prix Tel Aviv held in Tel Aviv, Israel and, a month later, she won the gold medal in that event at the Judo Grand Slam Düsseldorf held in Düsseldorf, Germany.

Boukli won the gold medal in the women's 48 kg event at the 2020 European Judo Championships held in Prague, Czech Republic. She defeated Andrea Stojadinov of Serbia in her gold medal match.

In 2021, Boukli competed in the women's 48 kg event at the Judo World Masters held in Doha, Qatar. A month later, she won the gold medal in her event at the 2021 Judo Grand Slam Tel Aviv held in Tel Aviv, Israel. In June 2021, she competed in the women's 48 kg event at the World Judo Championships held in Budapest, Hungary.

Boukli represented France at the 2020 Summer Olympics in Tokyo, Japan. She competed in the women's 48 kg event where she was eliminated in her first match.

At the 2021 Judo Grand Slam Abu Dhabi held in Abu Dhabi, United Arab Emirates, she won the silver medal in her event. She won the gold medal in her event at the 2022 Judo Grand Slam Tel Aviv held in Tel Aviv, Israel.

Boukli won the gold medal in the women's 48 kg event at the 2022 European Judo Championships held in Sofia, Bulgaria. She won the silver medal in the women's 48 kg event at the 2023 World Judo Championships held in Doha, Qatar. A few months later, she won the gold medal in her event at the 2023 European Judo Championships held in Montpellier, France.

Boukli represented France at the 2024 Summer Olympics in Paris, France. She won one of the bronze medals in the women's 48 kg event. She defeated Laura Martínez of Spain in her bronze medal match. Boukli also won the gold medal in the mixed team event.

== Personal life ==
Born in France, Boukli is of Algerian descent.

== Achievements ==
Year	Tournament	Place	Weight class
2020	European Championships	1st	−48 kg
2022	European Championships	1st	−48 kg
2023	World Championships	2nd	−48 kg
2023	European Championships	1st	−48 kg
2024	Summer Olympics	3rd	−48 kg
2025	European Championships	1st	−48 kg
2026	European Championships	1st	−48 kg
