= 2021 Judo Grand Slam Tel Aviv =

Judo competition

Judo 2021 Judo Grand Slam Tel Aviv
- Venue: Drive in Arena
- Location: Tel Aviv, Israel
- Dates: 18–20 February 2021
- Competitors: 418 from 60 nations

Competition at external databases
- Links: IJF • EJU • JudoInside

The 2021 Judo Grand Slam Tel Aviv was held at the Drive in Arena in Tel Aviv, Israel from 18 to 20 February 2021.

== Medal summary ==
=== Men's events ===
Event	Gold	Silver	Bronze
Extra-lightweight (−60 kg)	Davud Mammadsoy (AZE)	Temur Nozadze (GEO)	Gusman Kyrgyzbayev (KAZ)
Extra-lightweight (−60 kg)	Davud Mammadsoy (AZE)	Temur Nozadze (GEO)	Ramazan Abdulaev (RUS)
Half-lightweight (−66 kg)	Alberto Gaitero (ESP)	Dzmitry Minkou (BLR)	Sardor Nurillaev (UZB)
Half-lightweight (−66 kg)	Alberto Gaitero (ESP)	Dzmitry Minkou (BLR)	Mukhriddin Tilovov (UZB)
Lightweight (−73 kg)	Alexandru Raicu (ROU)	Giovanni Esposito (ITA)	Tohar Butbul (ISR)
Lightweight (−73 kg)	Alexandru Raicu (ROU)	Giovanni Esposito (ITA)	Nugzar Tatalashvili (GEO)
Half-middleweight (−81 kg)	Sharofiddin Boltaboev (UZB)	Saeid Mollaei (MGL)	Aslan Lappinagov (RUS)
Half-middleweight (−81 kg)	Sharofiddin Boltaboev (UZB)	Saeid Mollaei (MGL)	Frank de Wit (NED)
Middleweight (−90 kg)	Lasha Bekauri (GEO)	Nikoloz Sherazadishvili (ESP)	Krisztián Tóth (HUN)
Middleweight (−90 kg)	Lasha Bekauri (GEO)	Nikoloz Sherazadishvili (ESP)	Beka Gviniashvili (GEO)
Half-heavyweight (−100 kg)	Michael Korrel (NED)	Peter Paltchik (ISR)	Niyaz Ilyasov (RUS)
Half-heavyweight (−100 kg)	Michael Korrel (NED)	Peter Paltchik (ISR)	Ilia Sulamanidze (GEO)
Heavyweight (+100 kg)	Gela Zaalishvili (GEO)	Tamerlan Bashaev (RUS)	Guram Tushishvili (GEO)
Heavyweight (+100 kg)	Gela Zaalishvili (GEO)	Tamerlan Bashaev (RUS)	Jur Spijkers (NED)

Source Results

=== Women's events ===
Event	Gold	Silver	Bronze
Extra-lightweight (−48 kg)	Shirine Boukli (FRA)	Daria Bilodid (UKR)	Julia Figueroa (ESP)
Extra-lightweight (−48 kg)	Shirine Boukli (FRA)	Daria Bilodid (UKR)	Andrea Stojadinov (SRB)
Half-lightweight (−52 kg)	Chelsie Giles (GBR)	Gili Cohen (ISR)	Majlinda Kelmendi (KOS)
Half-lightweight (−52 kg)	Chelsie Giles (GBR)	Gili Cohen (ISR)	Réka Pupp (HUN)
Lightweight (−57 kg)	Timna Nelson-Levy (ISR)	Sarah-Léonie Cysique (FRA)	Hedvig Karakas (HUN)
Lightweight (−57 kg)	Timna Nelson-Levy (ISR)	Sarah-Léonie Cysique (FRA)	Eteri Liparteliani (GEO)
Half-middleweight (−63 kg)	Tina Trstenjak (SLO)	Andreja Leški (SLO)	Magdalena Krssakova (AUT)
Half-middleweight (−63 kg)	Tina Trstenjak (SLO)	Andreja Leški (SLO)	Sanne Vermeer (NED)
Middleweight (−70 kg)	Margaux Pinot (FRA)	Miriam Butkereit (GER)	Marie-Ève Gahié (FRA)
Middleweight (−70 kg)	Margaux Pinot (FRA)	Miriam Butkereit (GER)	Sanne van Dijke (NED)
Half-heavyweight (−78 kg)	Anna-Maria Wagner (GER)	Fanny Estelle Posvite (FRA)	Karla Prodan (CRO)
Half-heavyweight (−78 kg)	Anna-Maria Wagner (GER)	Fanny Estelle Posvite (FRA)	Marhinde Verkerk (NED)
Heavyweight (+78 kg)	Romane Dicko (FRA)	Rochele Nunes (POR)	Maryna Slutskaya (BLR)
Heavyweight (+78 kg)	Romane Dicko (FRA)	Rochele Nunes (POR)	Maria Suelen Altheman (BRA)

Source Results

=== Medal table ===
* Host nation (Israel)

Rank	Nation	Gold	Silver	Bronze	Total
1	France (FRA)	3	2	1	6
2	Georgia (GEO)	2	1	5	8
3	Israel (ISR)*	1	2	1	4
4	Spain (ESP)	1	1	1	3
5	Germany (GER)	1	1	0	2
5	Slovenia (SLO)	1	1	0	2
7	Netherlands (NED)	1	0	5	6
8	Uzbekistan (UZB)	1	0	2	3
9	Azerbaijan (AZE)	1	0	0	1
9	Great Britain (GBR)	1	0	0	1
9	Romania (ROU)	1	0	0	1
12	Russia (RUS)	0	1	3	4
13	Belarus (BLR)	0	1	1	2
14	Italy (ITA)	0	1	0	1
14	Mongolia (MGL)	0	1	0	1
14	Portugal (POR)	0	1	0	1
14	Ukraine (UKR)	0	1	0	1
18	Hungary (HUN)	0	0	3	3
19	Austria (AUT)	0	0	1	1
19	Brazil (BRA)	0	0	1	1
19	Croatia (CRO)	0	0	1	1
19	Kazakhstan (KAZ)	0	0	1	1
19	Kosovo (KOS)	0	0	1	1
19	Serbia (SRB)	0	0	1	1
Totals (24 entries)		14	14	28	56

== Event videos ==
The event will air freely on the IJF YouTube channel.

	Weight classes	Preliminaries			Final Block
Day 1	Men: -60, -66 Women: -48, -52, -57	Commentated			
Day 1	Men: -60, -66 Women: -48, -52, -57	Tatami 1	Tatami 2	Tatami 3	
Day 2	Men: -73, -81 Women: -63, -70	Commentated			
Day 2	Men: -73, -81 Women: -63, -70	Tatami 1	Tatami 2	Tatami 3	
Day 3	Men: -90, -100, +100 Women: -78, +78	Commentated			
Day 3	Men: -90, -100, +100 Women: -78, +78	Tatami 1	Tatami 2	Tatami 3	
