= 2023 Judo Grand Slam Tel Aviv =

Judo competition

Judo 2023 Judo Grand Slam Tel Aviv
- Venue: Drive in Arena
- Location: Tel Aviv, Israel
- Dates: 16–18 February 2023
- Competitors: 398 from 52 nations
- Total prize money: 154,000€

Competition at external databases
- Links: IJF • JudoInside

The 2023 Judo Grand Slam Tel Aviv is a Judo Grand Slam tournament that was held at the Drive in Arena in Tel Aviv, Israel, from 16 to 18 February 2023 as part of the IJF World Tour and during the 2024 Summer Olympics qualification period.

== Medal summary ==
=== Men's events ===
| Event | Gold | Silver | Bronze |
|---|---|---|---|
| Extra-lightweight (−60 kg) | Luka Mkheidze (FRA) | Francisco Garrigós (ESP) | Jorre Verstraeten (BEL) |
| Extra-lightweight (−60 kg) | Luka Mkheidze (FRA) | Francisco Garrigós (ESP) | Salih Yıldız (TUR) |
| Half-lightweight (−66 kg) | Vazha Margvelashvili (GEO) | Orkhan Safarov (AZE) | Alberto Gaitero (ESP) |
| Half-lightweight (−66 kg) | Vazha Margvelashvili (GEO) | Orkhan Safarov (AZE) | Lasha Nadiradze (GEO) |
| Lightweight (−73 kg) | Nils Stump (SUI) | Igor Wandtke (GER) | Mark Hristov (BUL) |
| Lightweight (−73 kg) | Nils Stump (SUI) | Igor Wandtke (GER) | Daniel Cargnin (BRA) |
| Half-middleweight (−81 kg) | Sagi Muki (ISR) | Vedat Albayrak (TUR) | François Gauthier-Drapeau (CAN) |
| Half-middleweight (−81 kg) | Sagi Muki (ISR) | Vedat Albayrak (TUR) | Timo Cavelius (GER) |
| Middleweight (−90 kg) | Beka Gviniashvili (GEO) | Krisztián Tóth (HUN) | Gantulgyn Altanbagana (MGL) |
| Middleweight (−90 kg) | Beka Gviniashvili (GEO) | Krisztián Tóth (HUN) | Mammadali Mehdiyev (AZE) |
| Half-heavyweight (−100 kg) | Zelym Kotsoiev (AZE) | Michael Korrel (NED) | Leonardo Gonçalves (BRA) |
| Half-heavyweight (−100 kg) | Zelym Kotsoiev (AZE) | Michael Korrel (NED) | Kyle Reyes (CAN) |
| Heavyweight (+100 kg) | Odkhüügiin Tsetsentsengel (MGL) | Ushangi Kokauri (AZE) | Rafael Silva (BRA) |
| Heavyweight (+100 kg) | Odkhüügiin Tsetsentsengel (MGL) | Ushangi Kokauri (AZE) | Emre Sanal (FRA) |

=== Women's events ===
| Event | Gold | Silver | Bronze |
|---|---|---|---|
| Extra-lightweight (−48 kg) | Blandine Pont (FRA) | Tamar Malca (ISR) | Natasha Ferreira (BRA) |
| Extra-lightweight (−48 kg) | Blandine Pont (FRA) | Tamar Malca (ISR) | Mireia Lapuerta Comas (ESP) |
| Half-lightweight (−52 kg) | Chelsie Giles (GBR) | Ana Pérez Box (ESP) | Larissa Pimenta (BRA) |
| Half-lightweight (−52 kg) | Chelsie Giles (GBR) | Ana Pérez Box (ESP) | Odette Giuffrida (ITA) |
| Lightweight (−57 kg) | Jessica Klimkait (CAN) | Christa Deguchi (CAN) | Timna Nelson-Levy (ISR) |
| Lightweight (−57 kg) | Jessica Klimkait (CAN) | Christa Deguchi (CAN) | Mina Libeer (BEL) |
| Half-middleweight (−63 kg) | Catherine Beauchemin-Pinard (CAN) | Maylín del Toro Carvajal (CUB) | Laura Fazliu (KOS) |
| Half-middleweight (−63 kg) | Catherine Beauchemin-Pinard (CAN) | Maylín del Toro Carvajal (CUB) | Lucy Renshall (GBR) |
| Middleweight (−70 kg) | Margaux Pinot (FRA) | Miriam Butkereit (GER) | Gabriella Willems (BEL) |
| Middleweight (−70 kg) | Margaux Pinot (FRA) | Miriam Butkereit (GER) | Aoife Coughlan (AUS) |
| Half-heavyweight (−78 kg) | Alice Bellandi (ITA) | Madeleine Malonga (FRA) | Patrícia Sampaio (POR) |
| Half-heavyweight (−78 kg) | Alice Bellandi (ITA) | Madeleine Malonga (FRA) | Mami Umeki (JPN) |
| Heavyweight (+78 kg) | Raz Hershko (ISR) | Kayra Sayit (TUR) | Karen Stevenson (NED) |
| Heavyweight (+78 kg) | Raz Hershko (ISR) | Kayra Sayit (TUR) | Milica Žabić (SRB) |

Source results:

=== Medal table ===
* Host nation (Israel)

| Rank | Nation | Gold | Silver | Bronze | Total |
|---|---|---|---|---|---|
| 1 | France (FRA) | 3 | 1 | 1 | 5 |
| 2 | Canada (CAN) | 2 | 1 | 2 | 5 |
| 3 | Israel (ISR)* | 2 | 1 | 1 | 4 |
| 4 | Georgia (GEO) | 2 | 0 | 1 | 3 |
| 5 | Azerbaijan (AZE) | 1 | 2 | 1 | 4 |
| 6 | Great Britain (GBR) | 1 | 0 | 1 | 2 |
| 6 | Italy (ITA) | 1 | 0 | 1 | 2 |
| 6 | Mongolia (MGL) | 1 | 0 | 1 | 2 |
| 9 | Switzerland (SUI) | 1 | 0 | 0 | 1 |
| 10 | Spain (ESP) | 0 | 2 | 2 | 4 |
| 11 | Germany (GER) | 0 | 2 | 1 | 3 |
| 11 | Turkey (TUR) | 0 | 2 | 1 | 3 |
| 13 | Netherlands (NED) | 0 | 1 | 1 | 2 |
| 14 | Cuba (CUB) | 0 | 1 | 0 | 1 |
| 14 | Hungary (HUN) | 0 | 1 | 0 | 1 |
| 16 | Brazil (BRA) | 0 | 0 | 5 | 5 |
| 17 | Belgium (BEL) | 0 | 0 | 3 | 3 |
| 18 | Australia (AUS) | 0 | 0 | 1 | 1 |
| 18 | Bulgaria (BUL) | 0 | 0 | 1 | 1 |
| 18 | Japan (JPN) | 0 | 0 | 1 | 1 |
| 18 | Kosovo (KOS) | 0 | 0 | 1 | 1 |
| 18 | Portugal (POR) | 0 | 0 | 1 | 1 |
| 18 | Serbia (SRB) | 0 | 0 | 1 | 1 |
| Totals (23 entries) | | 14 | 14 | 28 | 56 |

== Prize money ==
The sums written are per medalist, bringing the total prizes awarded to 154,000€. (retrieved from:)

| Medal | Total | Judoka | Coach |
|---|---|---|---|
| Gold | 5,000€ | 4,000€ | 1,000€ |
| Silver | 3,000€ | 2,400€ | 600€ |
| Bronze | 1,500€ | 1,200€ | 300€ |
