= 2026 European Judo Championships – Women's 48 kg =

Judo competition

Judo Women's 48 kg at the 2026 European Judo Championships
- Venue: Olympic Palace
- Location: Tbilisi, Georgia
- Date: 16 April 2026
- Competitors: 21 from 14 nations

Medalists
gold medal	Shirine Boukli (5th title)	France
silver medal	Sabina Giliazova	Russia
bronze medal	Marina Vorobeva	Russia
bronze medal	Laura Martínez	Spain

Competition at external databases
- Links: IJF

The women's 48 kg event at the 2026 European Judo Championships was held at the Olympic Palace in Tbilisi, Georgia on 16 April 2026.

== Results ==
=== Finals ===
Semi-finals
(France) Shirine Boukli	100
(Azerbaijan) Shafag Hamidova	000
(Russia) Sabina Giliazova	010
(Spain) Eva Pérez Soler	000

Final
(France) Shirine Boukli	100
(Russia) Sabina Giliazova	000

=== Repechage ===
Repechage
(Russia) Marina Vorobeva	100 (yellow card)
(Sweden) Tara Babulfath	000
(Turkey) Tuğçe Beder	000 (yellow card)
(Spain) Laura Martínez	110 (yellow card)

Bronze medal
(Russia) Marina Vorobeva	101 (yellow card)
(Spain) Eva Pérez Soler	000
(Spain) Laura Martínez	001 (yellow card)
(Azerbaijan) Shafag Hamidova	000

=== Pool A ===
First round
(Germany) Helen Habib	000
(Serbia) Andrea Stojadinov	100

Round of 16
(France) Shirine Boukli	010
(Georgia (country)) Julieta Rodonaia	000
(Russia) Marina Vorobeva	100
(Serbia) Andrea Stojadinov	001

Quarter-finals
(France) Shirine Boukli	001
(Russia) Marina Vorobeva	000

=== Pool B ===
First round
(Kosovo) Erza Muminoviq	001 (yellow card)
(Azerbaijan) Shafag Hamidova	110
(Turkey) Sıla Ersin	010
(Belgium) Loïs Petit	000

Round of 16
(Italy) Assunta Scutto	000
(Azerbaijan) Shafag Hamidova	010
(Sweden) Tara Babulfath	001
(Turkey) Sıla Ersin	000

Quarter-finals
(Azerbaijan) Shafag Hamidova	100
(Sweden) Tara Babulfath	000

=== Pool C ===
First round
(Belgium) Maëlys Dapa	000
(Hungary) Szabina Szeleczki	010 (yellow card)

Round of 16
(Russia) Sabina Giliazova	100 (yellow card)
(Hungary) Szabina Szeleczki	000
(Turkey) Tuğçe Beder	111
(Serbia) Nevena Milić	000 (yellow card)

Quarter-finals
(Russia) Sabina Giliazova	100
(Turkey) Tuğçe Beder	000

=== Pool D ===
First round
(Netherlands) Amber Gersjes	000
(Azerbaijan) Konul Aliyeva	100

Round of 16
(Spain) Laura Martínez	101 (yellow card)
(Azerbaijan) Konul Aliyeva	000
(Spain) Eva Pérez Soler	001 (yellow card)
(Germany) Sarah Ischt	000

Quarter-finals
(Spain) Laura Martínez	000 (yellow card)
(Spain) Eva Pérez Soler	001 (yellow card)
