= 2026 Judo Grand Slam Astana =

Judo competition

Judo 2026 Judo Grand Slam Astana
- Venue: Zhaksylyk Ushkempirov Martial Arts Palace
- Location: Astana, Kazakhstan
- Dates: 8–10 May 2026
- Competitors: 295 from 36 nations
- Total prize money: €154,000

Competition at external databases
- Links: IJF • JudoInside

The 2026 Judo Grand Slam Astana is a Judo Grand Slam tournament that was held at the Zhaksylyk Ushkempirov Martial Arts Palace in the city of Astana, Kazakhstan from 8 to 10 May 2026 as part of the IJF World Tour.

== Medal summary ==
=== Men's events ===
Event	Gold	Silver	Bronze
Extra-lightweight (−60 kg)	Byambasürengiin Sükhbat (MGL)	Talgat Orynbassar (KAZ)	Sherzod Davlatov (KAZ)
Extra-lightweight (−60 kg)	Byambasürengiin Sükhbat (MGL)	Talgat Orynbassar (KAZ)	Yang Yung-wei (TPE)
Half-lightweight (−66 kg)	Abdurakhim Nutfulloev (UZB)	Saigid Kerimov (RUS)	Ramazan Abdulaev (RUS)
Half-lightweight (−66 kg)	Abdurakhim Nutfulloev (UZB)	Saigid Kerimov (RUS)	Anvarjon Ibrohimov (UZB)
Lightweight (−73 kg)	Danil Lavrentev (RUS)	Fabio Basile (ITA)	Lavjargalyn Ankhzayaa (MGL)
Lightweight (−73 kg)	Danil Lavrentev (RUS)	Fabio Basile (ITA)	Angsarbek Gainullin (KAZ)
Half-middleweight (−81 kg)	Zhalgas Kairolla (KAZ)	Petru Pelivan (MDA)	David Lima (BRA)
Half-middleweight (−81 kg)	Zhalgas Kairolla (KAZ)	Petru Pelivan (MDA)	Vladyslav Kolobov (UKR)
Middleweight (−90 kg)	Boris Rutović (SRB)	Guilherme Schimidt (BRA)	Aidar Arapov (KAZ)
Middleweight (−90 kg)	Boris Rutović (SRB)	Guilherme Schimidt (BRA)	Mihail Latișev (MDA)
Half-heavyweight (−100 kg)	Marat Baikamurov (KAZ)	Vadim Ghimbovschi (MDA)	Michael Korrel (NED)
Half-heavyweight (−100 kg)	Marat Baikamurov (KAZ)	Vadim Ghimbovschi (MDA)	Leonardo Gonçalves (BRA)
Heavyweight (+100 kg)	Inal Tasoev (RUS)	Ushangi Kokauri (AZE)	Magomedomar Magomedomarov (UAE)
Heavyweight (+100 kg)	Inal Tasoev (RUS)	Ushangi Kokauri (AZE)	Jakub Sordyl (POL)

=== Women's events ===
Event	Gold	Silver	Bronze
Extra-lightweight (−48 kg)	Amber Gersjes (NED)	Ganbaataryn Narantsetseg (MGL)	Francesca Milani (ITA)
Extra-lightweight (−48 kg)	Amber Gersjes (NED)	Ganbaataryn Narantsetseg (MGL)	Kristina Dudina (RUS)
Half-lightweight (−52 kg)	Blandine Pont (FRA)	Bishreltiin Khorloodoi (UAE)	Myagmarsürengiin Nandin-Erdene (MGL)
Half-lightweight (−52 kg)	Blandine Pont (FRA)	Bishreltiin Khorloodoi (UAE)	Liliia Nugaeva (RUS)
Lightweight (−57 kg)	Faïza Mokdar (FRA)	Chloé Devictor (FRA)	Sarah Souza (BRA)
Lightweight (−57 kg)	Faïza Mokdar (FRA)	Chloé Devictor (FRA)	Shannon van de Meeberg (NED)
Half-middleweight (−63 kg)	Lkhagvatogoogiin Enkhriilen (MGL)	Dali Liluashvili (RUS)	Rafaela Silva (BRA)
Half-middleweight (−63 kg)	Lkhagvatogoogiin Enkhriilen (MGL)	Dali Liluashvili (RUS)	Sara-Joy Bauer (GER)
Middleweight (−70 kg)	Clémence Eme (FRA)	Miriam Butkereit (GER)	Nauana Silva (BRA)
Middleweight (−70 kg)	Clémence Eme (FRA)	Miriam Butkereit (GER)	Sanne van Dijke (NED)
Half-heavyweight (−78 kg)	Anna Monta Olek (GER)	Alina Böhm (GER)	Liz Ngelebeya (FRA)
Half-heavyweight (−78 kg)	Anna Monta Olek (GER)	Alina Böhm (GER)	Beatriz Freitas (BRA)
Heavyweight (+78 kg)	Elis Startseva (RUS)	Kamila Berlikash (KAZ)	Amarsaikhany Adiyaasüren (MGL)
Heavyweight (+78 kg)	Elis Startseva (RUS)	Kamila Berlikash (KAZ)	Aida Toishibekova (KAZ)

=== Medal table ===
* Host nation (Kazakhstan)

Rank	Nation	Gold	Silver	Bronze	Total
1	Russia (RUS)	3	2	3	8
2	France (FRA)	3	1	1	5
3	Kazakhstan (KAZ)*	2	2	4	8
4	Mongolia (MGL)	2	1	3	6
5	Germany (GER)	1	2	1	4
6	Netherlands (NED)	1	0	3	4
7	Uzbekistan (UZB)	1	0	1	2
8	Serbia (SRB)	1	0	0	1
9	Moldova (MDA)	0	2	1	3
10	Brazil (BRA)	0	1	6	7
11	Italy (ITA)	0	1	1	2
11	United Arab Emirates (UAE)	0	1	1	2
13	Azerbaijan (AZE)	0	1	0	1
14	Chinese Taipei (TPE)	0	0	1	1
14	Poland (POL)	0	0	1	1
14	Ukraine (UKR)	0	0	1	1
Totals (16 entries)		14	14	28	56

== Prize money ==
The sums written are per medalist, bringing the total prizes awarded to €154,000. (retrieved from:)

Medal	Total	Judoka	Coach
Gold	€5,000	€4,000	€1,000
Silver	€3,000	€2,400	€600
Bronze	€1,500	€1,200	€300
