= 2019 World Judo Juniors Championships =

Judo competition

Judo 2019 World Judo Juniors Championships
- Location: Marrakesh, Morocco
- Dates: 16–20 October 2019
- Competitors: 517 from 81 nations

Champions
- Mixed team: Japan (3rd title)

Competition at external databases
- Links: IJF • JudoInside

The 2019 World Judo Juniors Championships was an edition of the World Judo Juniors Championships, organised by the International Judo Federation. It was held in Marrakesh, Morocco from 16 to 20 October 2019. The final day of competition featured a mixed team event, won by team Japan.

== Medal summary ==
=== Medal table ===
* Host nation (Morocco)

| Rank | Nation | Gold | Silver | Bronze | Total |
|---|---|---|---|---|---|
| 1 | Japan (JPN) | 6 | 2 | 3 | 11 |
| 2 | Georgia (GEO) | 3 | 1 | 1 | 5 |
| 3 | Russia (RUS) | 1 | 3 | 0 | 4 |
| 4 | Hungary (HUN) | 1 | 1 | 2 | 4 |
| 5 | Brazil (BRA) | 1 | 0 | 3 | 4 |
| 6 | Mongolia (MGL) | 1 | 0 | 0 | 1 |
| 6 | Tajikistan (TJK) | 1 | 0 | 0 | 1 |
| 8 | Germany (GER) | 0 | 1 | 3 | 4 |
| 9 | France (FRA) | 0 | 1 | 2 | 3 |
| 9 | Netherlands (NED) | 0 | 1 | 2 | 3 |
| 9 | South Korea (KOR) | 0 | 1 | 2 | 3 |
| 12 | Azerbaijan (AZE) | 0 | 1 | 1 | 2 |
| 12 | Serbia (SRB) | 0 | 1 | 1 | 2 |
| 14 | Chinese Taipei (TPE) | 0 | 1 | 0 | 1 |
| 15 | Italy (ITA) | 0 | 0 | 2 | 2 |
| 15 | Turkey (TUR) | 0 | 0 | 2 | 2 |
| 17 | Kosovo (KOS) | 0 | 0 | 1 | 1 |
| 17 | Moldova (MDA) | 0 | 0 | 1 | 1 |
| 17 | North Korea (PRK) | 0 | 0 | 1 | 1 |
| 17 | Portugal (POR) | 0 | 0 | 1 | 1 |
| Totals (20 entries) | | 14 | 14 | 28 | 56 |

=== Men's events ===
| Event | Gold | Silver | Bronze |
|---|---|---|---|
| Extra-lightweight (-60 kg) | Konstantin Simeonidis (RUS) | Ahmad Yusifov (AZE) | Ken Suematsu (JPN) |
| Extra-lightweight (-60 kg) | Konstantin Simeonidis (RUS) | Ahmad Yusifov (AZE) | Salih Yıldız (TUR) |
| Half-lightweight (-66 kg) | Willian Lima (BRA) | Takeshi Takeoka (JPN) | Michael Marcelino (BRA) |
| Half-lightweight (-66 kg) | Willian Lima (BRA) | Takeshi Takeoka (JPN) | Ibrahim Aliyev (AZE) |
| Lightweight (-73 kg) | Somon Makhmadbekov (TJK) | Georgii Elbakiev (RUS) | Edoardo Mella (ITA) |
| Lightweight (-73 kg) | Somon Makhmadbekov (TJK) | Georgii Elbakiev (RUS) | Victor Sterpu (MDA) |
| Half-middleweight (-81 kg) | Vladimir Akhalkatsi (GEO) | David Karapetyan (RUS) | Guilherme Schimidt (BRA) |
| Half-middleweight (-81 kg) | Vladimir Akhalkatsi (GEO) | David Karapetyan (RUS) | Tato Grigalashvili (GEO) |
| Middleweight (-90 kg) | Lasha Bekauri (GEO) | Roland Gőz (HUN) | Gennaro Pirelli (ITA) |
| Middleweight (-90 kg) | Lasha Bekauri (GEO) | Roland Gőz (HUN) | Louis Mai (GER) |
| Half-heavyweight (-100 kg) | Kazunari Kamigaki (JPN) | Ilia Sulamanidze (GEO) | Zsombor Vég (HUN) |
| Half-heavyweight (-100 kg) | Kazunari Kamigaki (JPN) | Ilia Sulamanidze (GEO) | Mert Şişmanlar (TUR) |
| Heavyweight (+100 kg) | Sosuke Matsumura (JPN) | Erik Abramov (GER) | Kim Min-jong (KOR) |
| Heavyweight (+100 kg) | Sosuke Matsumura (JPN) | Erik Abramov (GER) | Richárd Sipőcz (HUN) |

=== Women's events ===
| Event | Gold | Silver | Bronze |
|---|---|---|---|
| Extra-lightweight (-48 kg) | Wakana Koga (JPN) | Shirine Boukli (FRA) | Andrea Stojadinov (SRB) |
| Extra-lightweight (-48 kg) | Wakana Koga (JPN) | Shirine Boukli (FRA) | Su Song Jon (PRK) |
| Half-lightweight (-52 kg) | Lkhagvasürengiin Sosorbaram (MGL) | Lin Hsuan Hsu (TPE) | Ayumi Kawada (JPN) |
| Half-lightweight (-52 kg) | Lkhagvasürengiin Sosorbaram (MGL) | Lin Hsuan Hsu (TPE) | Larissa Pimenta (BRA) |
| Lightweight (-57 kg) | Eteri Liparteliani (GEO) | Kanako Hakamata (JPN) | Pleuni Cornelisse (NED) |
| Lightweight (-57 kg) | Eteri Liparteliani (GEO) | Kanako Hakamata (JPN) | Kim Ji-su (KOR) |
| Half-middleweight (-63 kg) | Szofi Özbas (HUN) | Anja Obradović (SRB) | Laura Fazliu (KOS) |
| Half-middleweight (-63 kg) | Szofi Özbas (HUN) | Anja Obradović (SRB) | Asumi Ura (JPN) |
| Middleweight (-70 kg) | Mami Asahi (JPN) | Madina Taimazova (RUS) | Marlene Galandi (GER) |
| Middleweight (-70 kg) | Mami Asahi (JPN) | Madina Taimazova (RUS) | Morgane Fereol (FRA) |
| Half-heavyweight (-78 kg) | Rinoko Wada (JPN) | Renee Van Harselaar (NED) | Patrícia Sampaio (POR) |
| Half-heavyweight (-78 kg) | Rinoko Wada (JPN) | Renee Van Harselaar (NED) | Christina Faber (GER) |
| Heavyweight (+78 kg) | Ruri Takahashi (JPN) | Kim Ha-yun (KOR) | Tahina Durand (FRA) |
| Heavyweight (+78 kg) | Ruri Takahashi (JPN) | Kim Ha-yun (KOR) | Marit Kamps (NED) |

Source Results

=== Mixed ===
| Event | Gold | Silver | Bronze |
|---|---|---|---|
| Mixed team | Japan | Russia | Georgia |
| Mixed team | Japan | Russia | France |

Source Results
