= 2023 Judo Grand Prix Dushanbe =

Judo competition

Judo 2023 Judo Grand Prix Dushanbe
- Venue: Kasri Tennis
- Location: Dushanbe, Tajikistan
- Dates: 2–4 June 2023
- Competitors: 315 from 40 nations
- Total prize money: €98,000

Competition at external databases
- Links: IJF • EJU • JudoInside

The 2023 Judo Grand Prix Dushanbe was held at the Kasri Tennis arena in Dushanbe, Tajikistan from 2 to 4 June 2023 as part of the IJF World Tour and during the 2024 Summer Olympics qualification period.

== Medal summary ==
=== Men's events ===
Event	Gold	Silver	Bronze
Extra-lightweight (−60 kg)	Ramazan Abdulaev (AIN)	Turan Bayramov (AZE)	Mehrzod Sufiev (TJK)
Extra-lightweight (−60 kg)	Ramazan Abdulaev (AIN)	Turan Bayramov (AZE)	Luka Mkheidze (FRA)
Half-lightweight (−66 kg)	Obid Dzhebov (TJK)	Murad Chopanov (AIN)	Yashar Najafov (AZE)
Half-lightweight (−66 kg)	Obid Dzhebov (TJK)	Murad Chopanov (AIN)	Sunggat Zhubatkan (KAZ)
Lightweight (−73 kg)	Makhmadbek Makhmadbekov (AIN)	Behruzi Khojazoda (TJK)	Benjamin Axus (FRA)
Lightweight (−73 kg)	Makhmadbek Makhmadbekov (AIN)	Behruzi Khojazoda (TJK)	Gilberto Cardoso (MEX)
Half-middleweight (−81 kg)	Somon Makhmadbekov (TJK)	Shodmon Rizoev (TJK)	Ibrahim Keita (FRA)
Half-middleweight (−81 kg)	Somon Makhmadbekov (TJK)	Shodmon Rizoev (TJK)	Anri Egutidze (POR)
Middleweight (−90 kg)	Komronshokh Ustopiriyon (TJK)	Eldar Allakhverdiev (AIN)	David Klammert (CZE)
Middleweight (−90 kg)	Komronshokh Ustopiriyon (TJK)	Eldar Allakhverdiev (AIN)	Eljan Hajiyev (AZE)
Half-heavyweight (−100 kg)	Matvey Kanikovskiy (AIN)	Niyaz Bilalov (AIN)	Zlatko Kumrić (CRO)
Half-heavyweight (−100 kg)	Matvey Kanikovskiy (AIN)	Niyaz Bilalov (AIN)	Batkhuyagiin Gonchigsüren (MGL)
Heavyweight (+100 kg)	Tamerlan Bashaev (AIN)	Temur Rakhimov (TJK)	Yerassyl Kazhibayev (KAZ)
Heavyweight (+100 kg)	Tamerlan Bashaev (AIN)	Temur Rakhimov (TJK)	Magomedomar Magomedomarov (UAE)

=== Women's events ===
Event	Gold	Silver	Bronze
Extra-lightweight (−48 kg)	Maruša Štangar (SLO)	Sabina Giliazova (AIN)	Ganbaataryn Narantsetseg (MGL)
Extra-lightweight (−48 kg)	Maruša Štangar (SLO)	Sabina Giliazova (AIN)	Andrea Stojadinov (SRB)
Half-lightweight (−52 kg)	Alesya Kuznetsova (AIN)	Gultaj Mammadaliyeva (AZE)	Zhu Yeqing (CHN)
Half-lightweight (−52 kg)	Alesya Kuznetsova (AIN)	Gultaj Mammadaliyeva (AZE)	Bishreltiin Khorloodoi (UAE)
Lightweight (−57 kg)	Shukurjon Aminova (UZB)	Thauany Capanni Dias (ITA)	Cai Qi (CHN)
Lightweight (−57 kg)	Shukurjon Aminova (UZB)	Thauany Capanni Dias (ITA)	Veronica Toniolo (ITA)
Half-middleweight (−63 kg)	Katarina Krišto (CRO)	Sarai Padilla (ESP)	Iva Oberan (CRO)
Half-middleweight (−63 kg)	Katarina Krišto (CRO)	Sarai Padilla (ESP)	Magdalena Krssakova (AUT)
Middleweight (−70 kg)	Margaux Pinot (FRA)	Katarzyna Sobierajska (POL)	Loriana Kuka (KOS)
Middleweight (−70 kg)	Margaux Pinot (FRA)	Katarzyna Sobierajska (POL)	Kelly Petersen Pollard (GBR)
Half-heavyweight (−78 kg)	Anna Monta Olek (GER)	Anna-Maria Wagner (GER)	Giorgia Stangherlin (ITA)
Half-heavyweight (−78 kg)	Anna Monta Olek (GER)	Anna-Maria Wagner (GER)	Aleksandra Babintseva (AIN)
Heavyweight (+78 kg)	Rochele Nunes (POR)	Samira Bouizgarne (GER)	Amarsaikhany Adiyaasüren (MGL)
Heavyweight (+78 kg)	Rochele Nunes (POR)	Samira Bouizgarne (GER)	Daria Vladimirova (AIN)

Source results:

=== Medal table ===
* Host nation (Tajikistan)

Rank	Nation	Gold	Silver	Bronze	Total
–	Individual Neutral Athletes	5	4	2	11
1	Tajikistan (TJK)*	3	3	1	7
2	Germany (GER)	1	2	0	3
3	France (FRA)	1	0	3	4
4	Croatia (CRO)	1	0	2	3
5	Portugal (POR)	1	0	1	2
6	Slovenia (SLO)	1	0	0	1
6	Uzbekistan (UZB)	1	0	0	1
8	Azerbaijan (AZE)	0	2	2	4
9	Italy (ITA)	0	1	2	3
10	Poland (POL)	0	1	0	1
10	Spain (ESP)	0	1	0	1
12	Mongolia (MGL)	0	0	3	3
13	China (CHN)	0	0	2	2
13	Kazakhstan (KAZ)	0	0	2	2
13	United Arab Emirates (UAE)	0	0	2	2
16	Austria (AUT)	0	0	1	1
16	Czech Republic (CZE)	0	0	1	1
16	Great Britain (GBR)	0	0	1	1
16	Kosovo (KOS)	0	0	1	1
16	Mexico (MEX)	0	0	1	1
16	Serbia (SRB)	0	0	1	1
Totals (21 entries)		14	14	28	56

== Prize money ==
The sums written are per medalist, bringing the total prizes awarded to €98,000. (retrieved from:)

Medal	Total	Judoka	Coach
Gold	€3,000	€2,400	€600
Silver	€2,000	€1,600	€400
Bronze	€1,000	€800	€200
