= Mélanie Clément =

French judoka (born 1992)

Personal information
- Nationality: French
- Born: 3 May 1992 (age 34) Chaumont, Haute-Marne
- Occupation: Judoka

Sport
- Country: France
- Sport: Judo
- Weight class: –48 kg

Achievements and titles
- World Champ.: 5th (2019)
- European Champ.: (bronze) (2021)
Medal record
Women's judo
Representing France
European Championships
Gold medal – first place	2017 Warsaw	Women's team
Bronze medal – third place	2021 Lisbon	‍–‍48 kg
World Masters
Bronze medal – third place	2019 Qingdao	‍–‍48 kg
IJF Grand Slam
Gold medal – first place	2022 Tbilisi	‍–‍48 kg
Silver medal – second place	2021 Paris	‍–‍48 kg
Bronze medal – third place	2017 Ekaterinburg	‍–‍48 kg
Bronze medal – third place	2018 Düsseldorf	‍–‍48 kg
Bronze medal – third place	2020 Paris	‍–‍48 kg
Bronze medal – third place	2021 Abu Dhabi	‍–‍48 kg
Bronze medal – third place	2024 Abu Dhabi	‍–‍48 kg
IJF Grand Prix
Gold medal – first place	2019 Tbilisi	‍–‍48 kg
Silver medal – second place	2017 Düsseldorf	‍–‍48 kg
Silver medal – second place	2019 Zagreb	‍–‍48 kg
Bronze medal – third place	2017 Tbilisi	‍–‍48 kg
Bronze medal – third place	2018 Tbilisi	‍–‍48 kg
Bronze medal – third place	2019 Marrakesh	‍–‍48 kg
Bronze medal – third place	2020 Tel Aviv	‍–‍48 kg
World Juniors Championships
Bronze medal – third place	2011 Cape Town	‍–‍48 kg
European Junior Championships
Silver medal – second place	2011 Lommel	‍–‍48 kg

Profile at external databases
- IJF: 9368
- JudoInside.com: 49202
- Updated on 13 October 2024

Mélanie Clément (born 3 May 1992) is a French judoka. She won one of the bronze medals in the women's 48 kg event at the 2021 European Judo Championships held in Lisbon, Portugal. She competed at the World Judo Championships in 2017, 2018, 2019 and 2021.

== Career ==
In 2019, Clément won one of the bronze medals in the women's 48 kg event at the Judo World Masters held in Qingdao, China. In January 2020, she won one of the bronze medals in the women's 48 kg event at the Judo Grand Prix Tel Aviv held in Tel Aviv, Israel. In the same year, she lost her bronze medal match in the women's 48 kg event at the 2020 European Judo Championships held in Prague, Czech Republic.

At the 2021 Judo Grand Slam Abu Dhabi held in Abu Dhabi, United Arab Emirates, Clément won one of the bronze medals in her event.

== Achievements ==
Year	Tournament	Place	Event
2017	European Championships	1st	Team
2021	European Championships	3rd	−48 kg
