= 2021 Judo Grand Slam Abu Dhabi =

Judo competition

Judo 2021 Judo Grand Slam Abu Dhabi
- Venue: Mubadala Arena
- Location: Abu Dhabi, United Arab Emirates
- Dates: 26–28 November 2021
- Competitors: 223 from 41 nations
- Total prize money: 154,000$

Competition at external databases
- Links: IJF • EJU • JudoInside

The 2021 Judo Grand Slam Abu Dhabi was held at the Jiu-Jitsu Arena in Abu Dhabi, United Arab Emirates from 26 to 28 November 2021.

== Event videos ==
The event will air freely on the IJF YouTube channel.

	Weight classes	Preliminaries			Final Block
Day 1	Men: -60, -66 Women: -48, -52, -57	Commentated			Commentated
Day 1	Men: -60, -66 Women: -48, -52, -57	Tatami 1	Tatami 2	Tatami 3	Commentated
Day 2	Men: -73, -81 Women: -63, -70	Commentated			Commentated
Day 2	Men: -73, -81 Women: -63, -70	Tatami 1	Tatami 2	Tatami 3	Commentated
Day 3	Men: -90, -100, +100 Women: -78, +78	Commentated			Commentated
Day 3	Men: -90, -100, +100 Women: -78, +78	Tatami 1	Tatami 2	Tatami 3	Commentated

== Medal summary ==
=== Men's events ===
Event	Gold	Silver	Bronze
Extra-lightweight (−60 kg)	Yang Yung-wei (TPE)	Ramazan Abdulaev (RUS)	Samuel Hall (GBR)
Extra-lightweight (−60 kg)	Yang Yung-wei (TPE)	Ramazan Abdulaev (RUS)	Cédric Revol (FRA)
Half-lightweight (−66 kg)	Denis Vieru (MDA)	Ismail Misirov (RUS)	Bogdan Iadov (UKR)
Half-lightweight (−66 kg)	Denis Vieru (MDA)	Ismail Misirov (RUS)	Yondonperenlein Baskhüü (MGL)
Lightweight (−73 kg)	Tsend-Ochiryn Tsogtbaatar (MGL)	Khikmatillokh Turaev (UZB)	Lasha Shavdatuashvili (GEO)
Lightweight (−73 kg)	Tsend-Ochiryn Tsogtbaatar (MGL)	Khikmatillokh Turaev (UZB)	Armen Agaian (RUS)
Half-middleweight (−81 kg)	Matthias Casse (BEL)	Alan Khubetsov (RUS)	Lachlan Moorhead (GBR)
Half-middleweight (−81 kg)	Matthias Casse (BEL)	Alan Khubetsov (RUS)	Aslan Lappinagov (RUS)
Middleweight (−90 kg)	Mansur Lorsanov (RUS)	Komronshokh Ustopiriyon (TJK)	Dzhakhongir Madzhidov (TJK)
Middleweight (−90 kg)	Mansur Lorsanov (RUS)	Komronshokh Ustopiriyon (TJK)	Davlat Bobonov (UZB)
Half-heavyweight (−100 kg)	Arman Adamian (RUS)	Matvey Kanikovskiy (RUS)	Shady El Nahas (CAN)
Half-heavyweight (−100 kg)	Arman Adamian (RUS)	Matvey Kanikovskiy (RUS)	Michael Korrel (NED)
Heavyweight (+100 kg)	Odkhüügiin Tsetsentsengel (MGL)	Vlăduț Simionescu (ROU)	Temur Rakhimov (TJK)
Heavyweight (+100 kg)	Odkhüügiin Tsetsentsengel (MGL)	Vlăduț Simionescu (ROU)	Marc Deschenes (CAN)

=== Women's events ===
Event	Gold	Silver	Bronze
Extra-lightweight (−48 kg)	Assunta Scutto (ITA)	Shirine Boukli (FRA)	Catarina Costa (POR)
Extra-lightweight (−48 kg)	Assunta Scutto (ITA)	Shirine Boukli (FRA)	Mélanie Clément (FRA)
Half-lightweight (−52 kg)	Amandine Buchard (FRA)	Chelsie Giles (GBR)	Bishreltiin Khorloodoi (MGL)
Half-lightweight (−52 kg)	Amandine Buchard (FRA)	Chelsie Giles (GBR)	Gefen Primo (ISR)
Lightweight (−57 kg)	Telma Monteiro (POR)	Priscilla Gneto (FRA)	Lkhagvatogoogiin Enkhriilen (MGL)
Lightweight (−57 kg)	Telma Monteiro (POR)	Priscilla Gneto (FRA)	Faïza Mokdar (FRA)
Half-middleweight (−63 kg)	Lucy Renshall (GBR)	Sanne Vermeer (NED)	Ketleyn Quadros (BRA)
Half-middleweight (−63 kg)	Lucy Renshall (GBR)	Sanne Vermeer (NED)	Andreja Leški (SLO)
Middleweight (−70 kg)	Giovanna Scoccimarro (GER)	Shiho Tanaka (JPN)	Marie-Ève Gahié (FRA)
Middleweight (−70 kg)	Giovanna Scoccimarro (GER)	Shiho Tanaka (JPN)	Kelly Petersen Pollard (GBR)
Half-heavyweight (−78 kg)	Emma Reid (GBR)	Alina Böhm (GER)	Inbar Lanir (ISR)
Half-heavyweight (−78 kg)	Emma Reid (GBR)	Alina Böhm (GER)	Natalie Powell (GBR)
Heavyweight (+78 kg)	Beatriz Souza (BRA)	Léa Fontaine (FRA)	Coralie Hayme (FRA)
Heavyweight (+78 kg)	Beatriz Souza (BRA)	Léa Fontaine (FRA)	Raz Hershko (ISR)

Source Results

=== Medal table ===
* Host nation (United Arab Emirates)

Rank	Nation	Gold	Silver	Bronze	Total
1	Russia (RUS)	2	4	2	8
2	Great Britain (GBR)	2	1	4	7
3	Mongolia (MGL)	2	0	3	5
4	France (FRA)	1	3	5	9
5	Germany (GER)	1	1	0	2
6	Brazil (BRA)	1	0	1	2
6	Portugal (POR)	1	0	1	2
8	Belgium (BEL)	1	0	0	1
8	Chinese Taipei (TPE)	1	0	0	1
8	Italy (ITA)	1	0	0	1
8	Moldova (MDA)	1	0	0	1
12	Tajikistan (TJK)	0	1	2	3
13	Netherlands (NED)	0	1	1	2
13	Uzbekistan (UZB)	0	1	1	2
15	Japan (JPN)	0	1	0	1
15	Romania (ROU)	0	1	0	1
17	Israel (ISR)	0	0	3	3
18	Canada (CAN)	0	0	2	2
19	Georgia (GEO)	0	0	1	1
19	Slovenia (SLO)	0	0	1	1
19	Ukraine (UKR)	0	0	1	1
Totals (21 entries)		14	14	28	56

== Prize money ==
The sums written are per medalist, bringing the total prizes awarded to 154,000$. (retrieved from:)

Medal	Total	Judoka	Coach
Gold	5,000$	4,000$	1,000$
Silver	3,000$	2,400$	600$
Bronze	1,500$	1,200$	300$
