= Davud Mammadsoy =

Azerbaijani judoka (born 1995)

Personal information
- Full name: Davud Mammadsoy Ismat
- Born: 4 November 1995 (age 30) Shabran City
- Occupation: Judoka
- Height: 178 cm (5 ft 10 in)
- Weight: 71 kg (157 lb)

Sport
- Country: Azerbaijan
- Sport: Judo
- Weight class: ‍–‍60 kg
- Club: Republic Olympic Sport Lyceum

Achievements and titles
- World Champ.: R32 (2019)
Medal record
Men's judo
Representing Azerbaijan
IJF Grand Slam
Gold medal – first place	2021 Tel Aviv	‍–‍60 kg
Bronze medal – third place	2016 Tyumen	‍–‍60 kg
IJF Grand Prix
Bronze medal – third place	2016 Ulaanbaatar	‍–‍60 kg
European U23 Championships
Silver medal – second place	2015 Bratislava	‍–‍60 kg
European Junior Championships
Gold medal – first place	2013 Sarajevo	‍–‍55 kg

Profile at external databases
- IJF: 14726
- JudoInside.com: 35567
- Updated on 1 September 2022

Davud Mammadsoy (born 4 November 1995) is an Azerbaijani judoka.

Mammadsoy is the gold medalist of the 2021 Judo Grand Slam Tel Aviv in the ‍–‍60 kg category.
