= Kristina Dudina =

Russian judoka (born 2004)

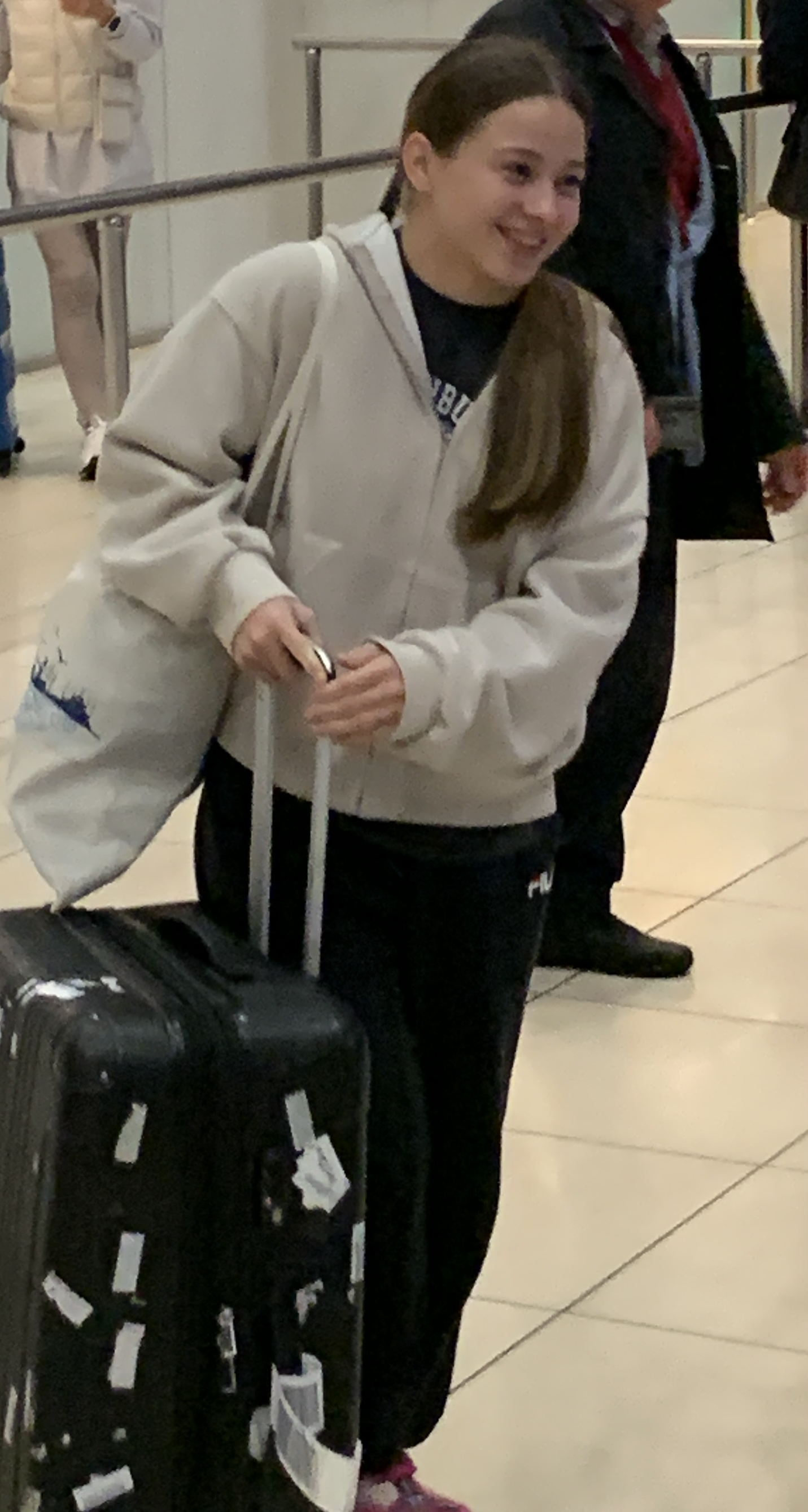
- Dudina after the 2023 Junior World Championships in Portugal.

Personal information
- Native name: Кристина Алексеевна Дудина
- Full name: Kristina Alekseevna Dudina
- Born: 10 July 2004 (age 22) Yekaterinburg, Sverdlovsk Oblast, Russia
- Occupation: Judoka

Sport
- Country: Russia
- Sport: Judo
- Weight class: ‍–‍48 kg
- Rank: 1st dan black belt
- Club: Rodina judo and sambo club (Yekaterinburg)

Achievements and titles
- World Champ.: R64 (2024)
- European Champ.: (gold) (2024)
Medal record
Women's judo
Representing Russia
IJF Grand Slam
Silver medal – second place	2026 Budapest	‍–‍48 kg
Bronze medal – third place	2026 Astana	‍–‍48 kg
IJF Grand Prix
Bronze medal – third place	2026 Qingdao	‍–‍48 kg
Representing the IJF
World Juniors Championships
Bronze medal – third place	2024 Dushanbe	‍–‍48 kg
Representing Individual Neutral Athletes
European Championships
Gold medal – first place	2024 Zagreb	‍–‍48 kg
IJF Grand Slam
Bronze medal – third place	2023 Astana	‍–‍48 kg
World Juniors Championships
Bronze medal – third place	2023 Odivelas	‍–‍48 kg
Women's sambo
Representing Russia
World Youth Championships
Silver medal – second place	2021 Thessaloniki	‍–‍50 kg
Gold medal – first place	2022 Yerevan	‍–‍50 kg
World Cadet Championships
Gold medal – first place	2020 Novi Sad	‍–‍48 kg

Profile at external databases
- IJF: 60452
- JudoInside.com: 146692
- Updated on 13 September 2026

Kristina Alekseevna Dudina (Russian: Кристина Алексеевна Дудина, born 10 July 2004) is a female Russian judoka and sambo competitor. 2024 European champion.

== Sport career ==
Her first style was sambo, where she came first at the 2020 cadet world championships. One year later she placed second at the 2021 youth world championships. Also, she took the world title at the 2022 youth world championships. In 2023, Dudina won the Russian junior judo nationals in Yekaterinburg. Kristina has also won distinction in international judo competition. She has bronze medals from the Grand Slam in Astana, Kazakhstan and the 2023 junior world championships held in Odivelas, Portugal. In 2024, she earned the gold medal at the senior European Championships in Zagreb, Croatia. In October 2024, she was a bronze medalist of the Junior World Championships held in Dushanbe, Tajikistan.

== Achievements ==
Year	Tournament	Place	Weight class
2023, 2024	Junior World Championships	3rd	−48 kg
2023	University International Sports Festival	1st	−48 kg
2023	Grand Slam Astana	3rd	−48 kg
2024	European Championships	1st	−48 kg
