= Blandine Pont =

French judoka (born 1998)

Personal information
- Born: 28 November 1998 (age 27)
- Occupation: Judoka

Sport
- Country: France
- Sport: Judo
- Weight class: ‍–‍48 kg, ‍–‍52 kg

Achievements and titles
- World Champ.: 5th (2023)
- European Champ.: (silver) (2024)
Medal record
Women's judo
Representing France
European Championships
Silver medal – second place	2024 Zagreb	‍–‍48 kg
IJF Grand Slam
Gold medal – first place	2023 Paris	‍–‍48 kg
Gold medal – first place	2023 Tel Aviv	‍–‍48 kg
Gold medal – first place	2023 Antalya	‍–‍48 kg
Gold medal – first place	2026 Tbilisi	‍–‍52 kg
Gold medal – first place	2026 Astana	‍–‍52 kg
Silver medal – second place	2026 Lausanne	‍–‍52 kg
Bronze medal – third place	2021 Paris	‍–‍48 kg
Bronze medal – third place	2022 Paris	‍–‍48 kg
Bronze medal – third place	2022 Tbilisi	‍–‍48 kg
Bronze medal – third place	2023 Abu Dhabi	‍–‍48 kg
Bronze medal – third place	2025 Dushanbe	‍–‍52 kg
IJF Grand Prix
Gold medal – first place	2021 Zagreb	‍–‍48 kg
European U23 Championships
Bronze medal – third place	2020 Poreč	‍–‍48 kg
European Cadet Championships
Silver medal – second place	2014 Athens	‍–‍48 kg

Profile at external databases
- IJF: 19324
- JudoInside.com: 13245
- Updated on 1 September 2026

Blandine Pont (born 28 November 1998) is a French judoka. She is the gold medalist in the ‍–‍48 kg at the 2021 Judo Grand Prix Zagreb She won the silver medal in her event at the 2024 European Judo Championships held in Zagreb, Croatia.
