= 2023 European Judo Championships =

Judo 2023 European Judo Championships
- Venue: Sud de France Arena
- Location: Montpellier, France
- Dates: 3–5 November 2023
- Competitors: 386 from 46 nations

Competition at external databases
- Links: IJF • EJU • JudoInside

The 2023 European Judo Championships were held at the Sud de France Arena in Montpellier, France, from 3 to 5 November 2023 as part of the IJF World Tour and during the 2024 Summer Olympics qualification period.

== Medal table ==
* Host nation (France)

Rank	Nation	Gold	Silver	Bronze	Total
1	France*	5	0	4	9
2	Azerbaijan	2	0	0	2
–	Individual Neutral Athletes	1	1	3	5
3	Serbia	1	1	0	2
4	Germany	1	0	2	3
5	Moldova	1	0	1	2
5	Turkey	1	0	1	2
7	Finland	1	0	0	1
7	Slovenia	1	0	0	1
9	Georgia	0	4	0	4
10	Spain	0	2	3	5
11	Israel	0	2	1	3
12	Kosovo	0	1	3	4
13	Italy	0	1	1	2
13	Portugal	0	1	1	2
13	Ukraine	0	1	1	2
16	Netherlands	0	0	3	3
17	Croatia	0	0	1	1
17	Great Britain	0	0	1	1
17	Hungary	0	0	1	1
17	Poland	0	0	1	1
Totals (20 entries)		14	14	28	56

== Medal summary ==
=== Men's events ===
Event	Gold	Silver	Bronze
Extra-lightweight (−60 kg)	Luka Mkheidze; France	Dilshot Khalmatov; Ukraine	Francisco Garrigós; Spain
Extra-lightweight (−60 kg)	Luka Mkheidze; France	Dilshot Khalmatov; Ukraine	Romain Valadier-Picard; France
Half-lightweight (−66 kg)	Denis Vieru; Moldova	David García Torné; Spain	Bogdan Iadov; Ukraine
Half-lightweight (−66 kg)	Denis Vieru; Moldova	David García Torné; Spain	Walide Khyar; France
Lightweight (−73 kg)	Hidayat Heydarov; Azerbaijan	Salvador Cases; Spain	Petru Pelivan; Moldova
Lightweight (−73 kg)	Hidayat Heydarov; Azerbaijan	Salvador Cases; Spain	Akil Gjakova; Kosovo
Half-middleweight (−81 kg)	Vedat Albayrak; Turkey	Tato Grigalashvili; Georgia	Alpha Oumar Djalo; France
Half-middleweight (−81 kg)	Vedat Albayrak; Turkey	Tato Grigalashvili; Georgia	Dominic Ressel; Germany
Middleweight (−90 kg)	Nemanja Majdov; Serbia	Lasha Bekauri; Georgia	Krisztián Tóth; Hungary
Middleweight (−90 kg)	Nemanja Majdov; Serbia	Lasha Bekauri; Georgia	Mihael Žgank; Turkey
Half-heavyweight (−100 kg)	Zelym Kotsoiev; Azerbaijan	Ilia Sulamanidze; Georgia	Matvey Kanikovskiy; Individual Neutral Athletes
Half-heavyweight (−100 kg)	Zelym Kotsoiev; Azerbaijan	Ilia Sulamanidze; Georgia	Nikoloz Sherazadishvili; Spain
Heavyweight (+100 kg)	Martti Puumalainen; Finland	Guram Tushishvili; Georgia	Valeriy Endovitskiy; Individual Neutral Athletes
Heavyweight (+100 kg)	Martti Puumalainen; Finland	Guram Tushishvili; Georgia	Jelle Snippe; Netherlands

=== Women's events ===
Event	Gold	Silver	Bronze
Extra-lightweight (−48 kg)	Shirine Boukli; France	Catarina Costa; Portugal	Laura Martínez; Spain
Extra-lightweight (−48 kg)	Shirine Boukli; France	Catarina Costa; Portugal	Sabina Giliazova; Individual Neutral Athletes
Half-lightweight (−52 kg)	Amandine Buchard; France	Distria Krasniqi; Kosovo	Mascha Ballhaus; Germany
Half-lightweight (−52 kg)	Amandine Buchard; France	Distria Krasniqi; Kosovo	Chelsie Giles; Great Britain
Lightweight (−57 kg)	Daria Kurbonmamadova; Individual Neutral Athletes	Marica Perišić; Serbia	Nora Gjakova; Kosovo
Lightweight (−57 kg)	Daria Kurbonmamadova; Individual Neutral Athletes	Marica Perišić; Serbia	Sarah-Léonie Cysique; France
Half-middleweight (−63 kg)	Andreja Leški; Slovenia	Gili Sharir; Israel	Laura Fazliu; Kosovo
Half-middleweight (−63 kg)	Andreja Leški; Slovenia	Gili Sharir; Israel	Angelika Szymańska; Poland
Middleweight (−70 kg)	Marie-Ève Gahié; France	Madina Taimazova; Individual Neutral Athletes	Sanne van Dijke; Netherlands
Middleweight (−70 kg)	Marie-Ève Gahié; France	Madina Taimazova; Individual Neutral Athletes	Barbara Matić; Croatia
Half-heavyweight (−78 kg)	Alina Böhm; Germany	Alice Bellandi; Italy	Patrícia Sampaio; Portugal
Half-heavyweight (−78 kg)	Alina Böhm; Germany	Alice Bellandi; Italy	Inbar Lanir; Israel
Heavyweight (+78 kg)	Romane Dicko; France	Raz Hershko; Israel	Marit Kamps; Netherlands
Heavyweight (+78 kg)	Romane Dicko; France	Raz Hershko; Israel	Asya Tavano; Italy

Source results:
