= Katharina Menz =

German judoka (born 1990)

Personal information
- Born: 8 October 1990 (age 35)
- Occupation: Judoka

Sport
- Country: Germany
- Sport: Judo
- Weight class: ‍–‍48 kg

Achievements and titles
- Olympic Games: R32 (2020, 2024)
- World Champ.: (silver) (2022)
- European Champ.: (bronze) (2020)
Medal record
Women's judo
Representing Germany
Olympic Games
Bronze medal – third place	2020 Tokyo	Mixed team
World Championships
Silver medal – second place	2022 Tashkent	‍–‍48 kg
European Championships
Bronze medal – third place	2020 Prague	‍–‍48 kg
IJF Grand Slam
Bronze medal – third place	2018 Ekaterinburg	‍–‍48 kg
Bronze medal – third place	2019 Abu Dhabi	‍–‍48 kg
IJF Grand Prix
Bronze medal – third place	2017 The Hague	‍–‍48 kg
Bronze medal – third place	2019 Marrakesh	‍–‍48 kg
Bronze medal – third place	2019 Hohhot	‍–‍48 kg
Bronze medal – third place	2019 Perth	‍–‍48 kg
Bronze medal – third place	2023 Perth	‍–‍48 kg
World Juniors Championships
Silver medal – second place	2009 Paris	‍–‍44 kg

Profile at external databases
- IJF: 1199
- JudoInside.com: 33560
- Updated on 27 July 2024

Katharina Menz (born 8 October 1990) is a German judoka. She won one of the bronze medals in the women's 48 kg event at the 2020 European Judo Championships held in Prague, Czech Republic. She also won one of the bronze medals in the mixed team event at the 2020 Summer Olympics held in Tokyo, Japan.

== Career ==
Menz was eliminated in her first match in the women's 48 kg event at the 2017 World Judo Championships held in Budapest, Hungary.

In 2019, Menz represented Germany at the European Games held in Minsk, Belarus. She competed in the women's 48 kg event where she was eliminated in her first match.

In 2021, Menz competed in the women's 48 kg event at the Judo World Masters held in Doha, Qatar. She also represented Germany at the 2020 Summer Olympics in Tokyo, Japan. She competed in the women's 48 kg event where she was eliminated in her first match. She won one of the bronze medals in the mixed team event.

Menz competed in the women's 48 kg event at the 2023 World Judo Championships held in Doha, Qatar. In 2024, she represented Germany at the Summer Olympics in Paris, France. She was eliminated in her first match in the women's 48 kg event.

== Achievements ==
Year	Tournament	Place	Weight class
2020	European Championships	3rd	−48 kg
