= Tamar Malca =

Israeli judoka (born 2000)

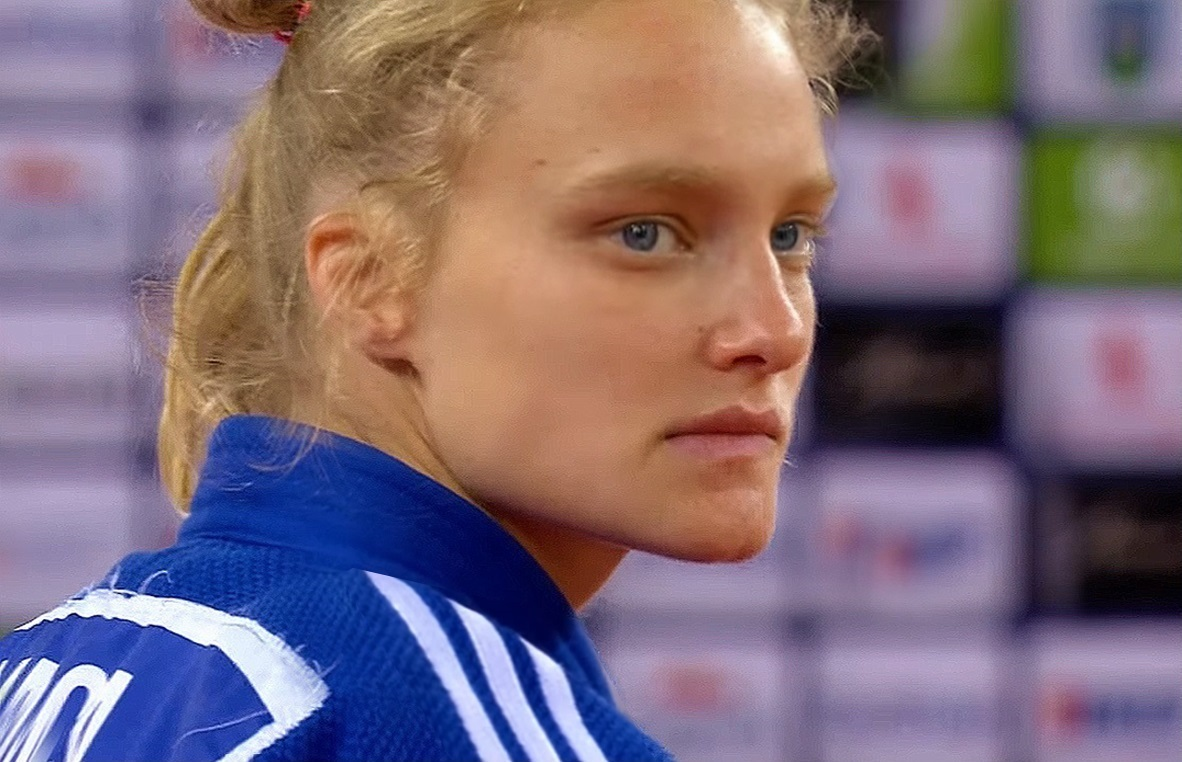
- Malca at the 2022 Zagreb Grand Prix

Personal information
- Native name: תמר מלכה
- Born: 23 June 2000 (age 26)
- Occupation: Judoka

Sport
- Country: Israel
- Sport: Judo
- Weight class: ‍–‍48 kg

Achievements and titles
- World Champ.: R32 (2023)
- European Champ.: (bronze) (2024)
Medal record
Women's judo
Representing Israel
European Championships
Bronze medal – third place	2024 Zagreb	‍–‍48 kg
IJF Grand Slam
Silver medal – second place	2023 Tel Aviv	‍–‍48 kg
Bronze medal – third place	2023 Ulaanbaatar	‍–‍48 kg
IJF Grand Prix
Bronze medal – third place	2025 Lima	‍–‍48 kg
Bronze medal – third place	2025 Guadalajara	‍–‍48 kg
European U23 Championships
Bronze medal – third place	2018 Győr	‍–‍48 kg
European Junior Championships
Bronze medal – third place	2020 Poreč	‍–‍48 kg
European Cadet Championships
Silver medal – second place	2017 Kaunas	‍–‍44 kg

Profile at external databases
- IJF: 24406
- JudoInside.com: 94548
- Updated on 19 October 2025

Tamar Malca (Hebrew: תמר מלכה; born 23 June 2000) is an Israeli judoka.

Malca won a bronze medal in the women's 48 kg event at the 2024 European Judo Championships.
