= Maruša Štangar =

Slovenian judoka (born 1998)

Personal information
- Born: 31 January 1998 (age 28)
- Occupation: Judoka

Sport
- Country: Slovenia
- Sport: Judo
- Weight class: ‍–‍48 kg

Achievements and titles
- Olympic Games: R16 (2020)
- World Champ.: 7th (2018)
- European Champ.: (bronze) (2019)
Medal record
Women's judo
Representing Slovenia
European Games
Bronze medal – third place	2019 Minsk	‍–‍48 kg
World Masters
Bronze medal – third place	2018 Guangzhou	‍–‍48 kg
IJF Grand Slam
Silver medal – second place	2019 Abu Dhabi	‍–‍48 kg
Bronze medal – third place	2021 Tbilisi	‍–‍48 kg
Bronze medal – third place	2022 Baku	‍–‍48 kg
IJF Grand Prix
Gold medal – first place	2018 Tbilisi	‍–‍48 kg
Gold medal – first place	2023 Linz	‍–‍48 kg
Gold medal – first place	2023 Dushanbe	‍–‍48 kg
Bronze medal – third place	2018 Agadir	‍–‍48 kg
Bronze medal – third place	2018 Budapest	‍–‍48 kg
Bronze medal – third place	2023 Zagreb	‍–‍48 kg
World Juniors Championships
Silver medal – second place	2015 Abu Dhabi	‍–‍48 kg
Bronze medal – third place	2017 Zagreb	‍–‍48 kg
European Junior Championships
Bronze medal – third place	2013 Sarajevo	‍–‍44 kg
World Cadets Championships
Bronze medal – third place	2013 Miami	‍–‍44 kg
European Cadet Championships
Gold medal – first place	2015 Sofia	‍–‍48 kg
Bronze medal – third place	2014 Athens	‍–‍48 kg
Youth Olympic Games
Bronze medal – third place	2014 Nanjing	‍–‍52 kg
Mediterranean Games
Bronze medal – third place	2018 Tarragona	‍–‍48 kg
Bronze medal – third place	2022 Oran	‍–‍48 kg

Profile at external databases
- IJF: 13461
- JudoInside.com: 85030
- Updated on 20 August 2023

Maruša Štangar (born 31 January 1998) is a Slovenian judoka. She won one of the bronze medals in the women's 48 kg event at the 2019 European Games held in Minsk, Belarus. She also competed at several editions of the World Judo Championships.

== Career ==
Štangar won one of the bronze medals in the girls' 52 kg event at the 2014 Summer Youth Olympics held in Nanjing, China.

In 2018, Štangar won one of the bronze medals in the women's 48 kg event at the Mediterranean Games held in Tarragona, Spain. At the 2018 Judo World Masters held in Guangzhou, China, she won one of the bronze medals in her event. In 2020, she was eliminated in her first match in the women's 48 kg event at the European Judo Championships held in Prague, Czech Republic. Her opponent, Andrea Stojadinov of Serbia, went on to win the silver medal.

In 2021, Štangar competed in the women's 48 kg event at the 2020 Summer Olympic Games in Tokyo, Japan. This was her Olympic debut. She won her first match against Kang Yu-jeong of South Korea and she was then eliminated in her next match by Paula Pareto of Argentina.

Štangar won one of the bronze medals in the women's 48 kg event at the 2022 Mediterranean Games held in Oran, Algeria. In 2024, she represented Slovenia at the Summer Olympics in Paris, France. She was eliminated in her first match in the women's 48 kg event.
