= Chishima Maeda =

Japanese judoka (born 1997)

Personal information
- Nationality: Japanese
- Born: 4 March 1997 (age 29)
- Occupation: Judoka

Sport
- Country: Japan
- Sport: Judo
- Weight class: –52 kg
Medal record
Women's judo
Representing Japan
IJF Grand Slam
| Bronze medal – third place | 2019 Düsseldorf | ‍–‍52 kg |
| Bronze medal – third place | 2019 Osaka | ‍–‍52 kg |
IJF Grand Prix
| Gold medal – first place | 2019 Budapest | ‍–‍52 kg |
| Gold medal – first place | 2020 Tel Aviv | ‍–‍52 kg |
World Juniors Championships
| Silver medal – second place | 2017 Zagreb | ‍–‍52 kg |
World Cadets Championships
| Bronze medal – third place | 2013 Miami | ‍–‍52 kg |

Profile at external databases
- IJF: 13218
- JudoInside.com: 37484
- Updated on 21 May 2023

Chishima Maeda (born 4 March 1997) is a Japanese judoka.

She is the gold medallist of the 2019 Judo Grand Prix Budapest in the -52 kg category.
