= 2024 European Judo Championships =

Judo 2024 European Judo Championships
- Venue: Arena Zagreb
- Location: Zagreb, Croatia
- Dates: 25–28 April 2024
- Competitors: 427 from 47 nations

Champions
- Mixed team: France (2nd title)

Competition at external databases
- Links: IJF • JudoInside

The 2024 European Judo Championships was held at the Arena Zagreb in Zagreb, Croatia, from 25 to 28 April 2024 as part of the IJF World Tour and during the 2024 Summer Olympics qualification period.

== Medal table ==
* Host nation (Croatia)

Rank	Nation	Gold	Silver	Bronze	Total
–	Individual Neutral Athletes (AIN)	3	1	1	5
1	Georgia	2	3	3	8
2	France	2	2	3	7
3	Azerbaijan	2	1	0	3
4	Israel	1	0	3	4
5	Spain	1	0	2	3
6	Croatia*	1	0	1	2
7	Czech Republic	1	0	0	1
7	Kosovo	1	0	0	1
7	Ukraine	1	0	0	1
10	Netherlands	0	2	1	3
11	Italy	0	1	3	4
11	Turkey	0	1	3	4
13	Germany	0	1	2	3
13	Hungary	0	1	2	3
15	Slovenia	0	1	1	2
16	Greece	0	1	0	1
17	Austria	0	0	1	1
17	Portugal	0	0	1	1
17	Romania	0	0	1	1
17	Serbia	0	0	1	1
17	Slovakia	0	0	1	1
Totals (21 entries)		15	15	30	60

== Medal summary ==
=== Men's events ===
Event	Gold	Silver	Bronze
Extra-lightweight (−60 kg)	Francisco Garrigós; Spain	Balabay Aghayev; Azerbaijan	Salih Yıldız; Turkey
Extra-lightweight (−60 kg)	Francisco Garrigós; Spain	Balabay Aghayev; Azerbaijan	Cédric Revol; France
Half-lightweight (−66 kg)	Vazha Margvelashvili; Georgia	Muhammed Demirel; Turkey	Bence Pongrácz; Hungary
Half-lightweight (−66 kg)	Vazha Margvelashvili; Georgia	Muhammed Demirel; Turkey	Elios Manzi; Italy
Lightweight (−73 kg)	Hidayat Heydarov; Azerbaijan	Danil Lavrentev; Individual Neutral Athletes	Lasha Shavdatuashvili; Georgia
Lightweight (−73 kg)	Hidayat Heydarov; Azerbaijan	Danil Lavrentev; Individual Neutral Athletes	Joan-Benjamin Gaba; France
Half-middleweight (−81 kg)	Tato Grigalashvili; Georgia	Frank de Wit; Netherlands	Vedat Albayrak; Turkey
Half-middleweight (−81 kg)	Tato Grigalashvili; Georgia	Frank de Wit; Netherlands	Shamil Borchashvili; Austria
Middleweight (−90 kg)	Eljan Hajiyev; Azerbaijan	Krisztián Tóth; Hungary	Lasha Bekauri; Georgia
Middleweight (−90 kg)	Eljan Hajiyev; Azerbaijan	Krisztián Tóth; Hungary	Alex Creț; Romania
Half-heavyweight (−100 kg)	Matvey Kanikovskiy; Individual Neutral Athletes	Ilia Sulamanidze; Georgia	Michael Korrel; Netherlands
Half-heavyweight (−100 kg)	Matvey Kanikovskiy; Individual Neutral Athletes	Ilia Sulamanidze; Georgia	Gennaro Pirelli; Italy
Heavyweight (+100 kg)	Inal Tasoev; Individual Neutral Athletes	Guram Tushishvili; Georgia	Tamerlan Bashaev; Individual Neutral Athletes
Heavyweight (+100 kg)	Inal Tasoev; Individual Neutral Athletes	Guram Tushishvili; Georgia	Márius Fízeľ; Slovakia

Source results:

=== Women's events ===
Event	Gold	Silver	Bronze
Extra-lightweight (−48 kg)	Kristina Dudina; Individual Neutral Athletes	Blandine Pont; France	Catarina Costa; Portugal
Extra-lightweight (−48 kg)	Kristina Dudina; Individual Neutral Athletes	Blandine Pont; France	Tamar Malca; Israel
Half-lightweight (−52 kg)	Distria Krasniqi; Kosovo	Odette Giuffrida; Italy	Réka Pupp; Hungary
Half-lightweight (−52 kg)	Distria Krasniqi; Kosovo	Odette Giuffrida; Italy	Ariane Toro; Spain
Lightweight (−57 kg)	Daria Bilodid; Ukraine	Kaja Kajzer; Slovenia	Eteri Liparteliani; Georgia
Lightweight (−57 kg)	Daria Bilodid; Ukraine	Kaja Kajzer; Slovenia	Timna Nelson-Levy; Israel
Half-middleweight (−63 kg)	Renata Zachová; Czech Republic	Joanne van Lieshout; Netherlands	Andreja Leški; Slovenia
Half-middleweight (−63 kg)	Renata Zachová; Czech Republic	Joanne van Lieshout; Netherlands	Savita Russo; Italy
Middleweight (−70 kg)	Barbara Matić; Croatia	Elisavet Teltsidou; Greece	Lara Cvjetko; Croatia
Middleweight (−70 kg)	Barbara Matić; Croatia	Elisavet Teltsidou; Greece	Ai Tsunoda; Spain
Half-heavyweight (−78 kg)	Audrey Tcheuméo; France	Anna-Maria Wagner; Germany	Alina Böhm; Germany
Half-heavyweight (−78 kg)	Audrey Tcheuméo; France	Anna-Maria Wagner; Germany	Inbar Lanir; Israel
Heavyweight (+78 kg)	Raz Hershko; Israel	Julia Tolofua; France	Léa Fontaine; France
Heavyweight (+78 kg)	Raz Hershko; Israel	Julia Tolofua; France	Kayra Ozdemir; Turkey

Source results:

=== Mixed events ===
Event	Gold	Silver	Bronze
Mixed team	France: Joan-Benjamin Gaba; Maxime Gobert; Eniel Caroly; Alexis Mathieu; Mathéo Akiana Mongo; Khamzat Saparbaev; Priscilla Gneto; Faïza Mokdar; Margaux Pinot; Florine Soula; Léa Fontaine; Julia Tolofua	Georgia: Giorgi Chikhelidze; Lasha Shavdatuashvili; Lasha Bekauri; Giorgi Jabniashvili; Saba Inaneishvili; Guram Tushishvili; Eteri Liparteliani; Nino Loladze; Eter Askilashvili; Mariam Tchanturia; Nino Gulbani; Sophio Somkhishvili	Germany: Jano Rübo; Johann Lenz; Johannes Frey; Jana Ziegler; Samira Bock; Renée Lucht; Anna Monta Olek
Mixed team	France: Joan-Benjamin Gaba; Maxime Gobert; Eniel Caroly; Alexis Mathieu; Mathéo Akiana Mongo; Khamzat Saparbaev; Priscilla Gneto; Faïza Mokdar; Margaux Pinot; Florine Soula; Léa Fontaine; Julia Tolofua	Georgia: Giorgi Chikhelidze; Lasha Shavdatuashvili; Lasha Bekauri; Giorgi Jabniashvili; Saba Inaneishvili; Guram Tushishvili; Eteri Liparteliani; Nino Loladze; Eter Askilashvili; Mariam Tchanturia; Nino Gulbani; Sophio Somkhishvili	Serbia: Strahinja Bunčić; Filip Jovanović; Darko Brašnjović; Nemanja Majdov; Bojan Došen; Igor Vračar; Marica Perišić; Andrea Stojadinov; Jovana Bunčić; Jovana Čakarević; Milica Cvijić; Milica Žabić

Source results:

== Participating nations ==
427 judoka from 45 countries:

1. Albania (2)
2. Armenia (3)
3. Austria (15)
4. Azerbaijan (13)
5. Belgium (11)
6. Bosnia and Herzegovina (8)
7. Bulgaria (11)
8. Croatia (18) (Host)
9. Cyprus (7)
10. Czech Republic (6)
11. Denmark (4)
12. Spain (18)
13. Estonia (4)
14. Finland (5)
15. France (18)
16. Georgia (15)
17. Germany (18)
18. United Kingdom (10)
19. Greece (6)
20. Hungary (11)
21. Iceland (1)
22. Ireland (3)
23. Israel (17)
24. Italy (18)
25. Kosovo (5)
26. Latvia (2)
27. Lithuania (5)
28. Luxembourg (1)
29. Moldova (10)
30. Malta (3)
31. Monaco (2)
32. Montenegro (2)
33. Netherlands (18)
34. North Macedonia (1)
35. Norway (2)
36. Poland (8)
37. Portugal (15)
38. Romania (10)
39. Serbia (17)
40. Slovakia (3)
41. Slovenia (10)
42. Switzerland (3)
43. Sweden (2)
44. Turkey (16)
45. Ukraine (18)
46. Individual Neutral Athletes (23)
47. IJF Refugee Team (9)
