= Sabina Giliazova =

Russian judoka (born 1994)

Personal information
- Native name: Сабина Альбертовна Гилязова
- Born: 30 September 1994 (age 32) Katav-Ivanovsk, Chelyabinsk Oblast, Russia
- Occupation: Judoka

Sport
- Country: Russia
- Sport: Judo
- Weight class: ‍–‍48 kg

Achievements and titles
- World Champ.: (bronze) (2026)
- European Champ.: (silver) (2026)
- Highest world ranking: 2^{nd}
Medal record
Women's judo
Representing Russia
World Championships
Bronze medal – third place	2026 Baku	‍–‍48 kg
European Championships
Silver medal – second place	2026 Tbilisi	‍–‍48 kg
Bronze medal – third place	2021 Lisbon	‍–‍48 kg
IJF Grand Slam
Gold medal – first place	2026 Budapest	‍–‍48 kg
Silver medal – second place	2017 Ekaterinburg	‍–‍48 kg
Bronze medal – third place	2016 Tyumen	‍–‍48 kg
Bronze medal – third place	2020 Düsseldorf	‍–‍48 kg
Bronze medal – third place	2026 Tbilisi	‍–‍48 kg
IJF Grand Prix
Gold medal – first place	2019 Tashkent	‍–‍48 kg
Bronze medal – third place	2017 Antalya	‍–‍48 kg
Representing the IJF
IJF Grand Slam
Gold medal – first place	2024 Abu Dhabi	‍–‍48 kg
Silver medal – second place	2025 Astana	‍–‍48 kg
Bronze medal – third place	2025 Tashkent	‍–‍48 kg
Bronze medal – third place	2025 Ulaanbaatar	‍–‍48 kg
Representing Individual Neutral Athletes
European Championships
Bronze medal – third place	2023 Montpellier	‍–‍48 kg
IJF Grand Slam
Gold medal – first place	2024 Tashkent	‍–‍48 kg
Silver medal – second place	2023 Ulaanbaatar	‍–‍48 kg
Silver medal – second place	2024 Astana	‍–‍48 kg
Bronze medal – third place	2023 Baku	‍–‍48 kg
IJF Grand Prix
Silver medal – second place	2023 Dushanbe	‍–‍48 kg

Profile at external databases
- IJF: 14920
- JudoInside.com: 55333
- Updated on 4 October 2026

Sabina Albertovna Giliazova (Russian: Сабина Альбертовна Гилязова; born 30 September 1994) is a Russian judoka. She won a bronze medal at the 2021 European Judo Championships.

== Career ==
In 2020, Giliazova won one of the bronze medals in the women's 48 kg event at the 2020 Judo Grand Slam Düsseldorf held in Düsseldorf, Germany.

In 2021, she won one of the bronze medals in the women's 48 kg event at the 2021 European Judo Championships held in Lisbon, Portugal.

== Achievements ==
Year	Tournament	Place	Weight class
2021	European Championships	3rd	−48 kg
2023	European Championships	3rd	−48 kg
2026	European Championships	2nd	−48 kg
