= Tara Babulfath =

Swedish judoka (born 2006)

Personal information
- Nickname: Pippi
- Born: Persian: تارا باب‌الفتح; 3 January 2006 (age 20) Stockholm, Sweden
- Occupation: Judoka
- Height: 1.54 m (5 ft 1 in)

Sport
- Country: Sweden
- Sport: Judo
- Weight class: ‍–‍48 kg
- Rank: 1st dan black belt
- Club: IK Södra
- Turned pro: 2023–present
- Coached by: Nami Nabekura

Achievements and titles
- Olympic Games: (bronze) (2024)
- World Champ.: (bronze) (2024)
- European Champ.: 7th (2023, 2026)
- Highest world ranking: 2^{nd}
Medal record
Women's judo
Representing Sweden
Olympic Games
Bronze medal – third place	2024 Paris	‍–‍48 kg
World Championships
Bronze medal – third place	2024 Abu Dhabi	‍–‍48 kg
IJF Grand Slam
Gold medal – first place	2024 Baku	‍–‍48 kg
Silver medal – second place	2025 Baku	‍–‍48 kg
Silver medal – second place	2026 Tbilisi	‍–‍48 kg
Bronze medal – third place	2024 Tashkent	‍–‍48 kg
Bronze medal – third place	2025 Paris	‍–‍48 kg
Bronze medal – third place	2025 Tbilisi	‍–‍48 kg
European U23 Championships
Gold medal – first place	2024 Piła	‍–‍48 kg
World Cadets Championships
Silver medal – second place	2022 Sarajevo	‍–‍48 kg
Bronze medal – third place	2023 Zagreb	‍–‍48 kg
European Cadet Championships
Gold medal – first place	2022 Poreč	‍–‍48 kg
Silver medal – second place	2021 Riga	‍–‍44 kg

Profile at external databases
- IJF: 63951
- JudoInside.com: 131689
- Updated on 16 April 2026

Tara Babulfath (born 3 January 2006) is a Swedish judoka. She is an Olympic and World Championships bronze medalist in the women's 48 kg division.

Babulfath is also a European Cadet and IJF Grand Slam champion, having won the 48 kg events at the 2022 European Cadet Championships in Poreč and the 2024 Baku Grand Slam. She also earned silver and bronze medals at the World Cadets Championships.

Babulfath placed third at the 2024 World Championships and won a bronze medal in the women's 48 kg event at the 2024 Summer Olympics in Paris, becoming the first Swedish judoka to win an Olympic medal. She was also one of Sweden's 2024 Summer Olympics closing ceremony flag bearers. Babulfath is coached by Jane Bridge.

== Family ==
Tara Babulfath is the daughter of Iranian-born Swedish wrestler Mohammad Babulfath, who competed at the 2004 Summer Olympics, and wrestler Ida Hellström, a four-time World Wrestling Championships medalist.
