= 2020 European Judo Championships =

Judo 2020 European Judo Championships
- Venue: O2 Arena
- Location: Prague, Czech Republic
- Dates: 19–21 November 2020
- Competitors: 345 from 40 nations

Competition at external databases
- Links: IJF • EJU • JudoInside

The 2020 European Judo Championships were held in Prague, Czech Republic from 19 to 21 November 2020.

== Medal overview ==
=== Men ===
Event	Gold	Silver	Bronze
−60 kg	Robert Mshvidobadze; Russia	Yago Abuladze; Russia	Francisco Garrigós; Spain Jorre Verstraeten; Belgium
−66 kg	Orkhan Safarov; Azerbaijan	Tal Flicker; Israel	Denis Vieru; Moldova Kilian Le Blouch; France
−73 kg	Victor Sterpu; Moldova	Lasha Shavdatuashvili; Georgia	Rustam Orujov; Azerbaijan Tommy Macias; Sweden
−81 kg	Tato Grigalashvili; Georgia	Ivaylo Ivanov; Bulgaria	Luka Maisuradze; Georgia Matthias Casse; Belgium
−90 kg	Mikhail Igolnikov; Russia	Nemanja Majdov; Serbia	Beka Gviniashvili; Georgia Mammadali Mehdiyev; Azerbaijan
−100 kg	Peter Paltchik; Israel	Arman Adamian; Russia	Jorge Fonseca; Portugal Zelym Kotsoiev; Azerbaijan
+100 kg	Tamerlan Bashaev; Russia	Inal Tasoev; Russia	Guram Tushishvili; Georgia Levani Matiashvili; Georgia

=== Women ===
Event	Gold	Silver	Bronze
−48 kg	Shirine Boukli; France	Andrea Stojadinov; Serbia	Distria Krasniqi; Kosovo Katharina Menz; Germany
−52 kg	Odette Giuffrida; Italy	Andreea Chițu; Romania	Charline Van Snick; Belgium Estrella López Sheriff; Spain
−57 kg	Hedvig Karakas; Hungary	Telma Monteiro; Portugal	Sarah-Léonie Cysique; France Theresa Stoll; Germany
−63 kg	Clarisse Agbegnenou; France	Magdalena Krssakova; Austria	Martyna Trajdos; Germany Juul Franssen; Netherlands
−70 kg	Margaux Pinot; France	Sanne van Dijke; Netherlands	Madina Taimazova; Russia Marie-Ève Gahié; France
−78 kg	Madeleine Malonga; France	Luise Malzahn; Germany	Karla Prodan; Croatia Loriana Kuka; Kosovo
+78 kg	Romane Dicko; France	Iryna Kindzerska; Azerbaijan	Rochele Nunes; Portugal Yelyzaveta Kalanina; Ukraine

== Medal table ==
Rank	Nation	Gold	Silver	Bronze	Total
1	France	5	0	3	8
2	Russia	3	3	1	7
3	Georgia	1	1	4	6
4	Azerbaijan	1	1	3	5
5	Israel	1	1	0	2
6	Moldova	1	0	1	2
7	Hungary	1	0	0	1
7	Italy	1	0	0	1
9	Serbia	0	2	0	2
10	Germany	0	1	3	4
11	Portugal	0	1	2	3
12	Netherlands	0	1	1	2
13	Austria	0	1	0	1
13	Bulgaria	0	1	0	1
13	Romania	0	1	0	1
16	Belgium	0	0	3	3
17	Kosovo	0	0	2	2
17	Spain	0	0	2	2
19	Croatia	0	0	1	1
19	Sweden	0	0	1	1
19	Ukraine	0	0	1	1
Totals (21 entries)		14	14	28	56

== Participating nations ==
- Armenia (1)
- Austria (10)
- Azerbaijan (14)
- Belarus (8)
- Belgium (14)
- Bosnia and Herzegovina (2)
- Bulgaria (7)
- Croatia (6)
- Czech Republic (12)
- Denmark (2)
- Estonia (3)
- Finland (3)
- France (17)
- Georgia (11)
- Germany (18)
- Greece (9)
- Hungary (11)
- Iceland (2)
- Ireland (4)
- Israel (8)
- Italy (16)
- Kosovo (3)
- Latvia (1)
- Lithuania (2)
- Luxembourg (1)
- Moldova (7)
- Montenegro (2)
- Netherlands (15)
- Poland (17)
- Portugal (16)
- Romania (13)
- Russia (18)
- Serbia (11)
- Slovakia (6)
- Slovenia (10)
- Spain (13)
- Sweden (2)
- Switzerland (6)
- Turkey (11)
- Ukraine (13)
