= Catarina Costa =

Portuguese judoka (born 1996)

Personal information
- Full name: Catarina Martins de Mesquita Paiva Costa
- Born: 21 September 1996 (age 29) Coimbra, Portugal
- Education: Medicine
- Occupation: Judoka
- Height: 155 cm (5 ft 1 in)

Sport
- Country: Portugal
- Sport: Judo
- Weight class: ‍–‍48 kg
- University team: University of Coimbra
- Club: Associação Académica de Coimbra
- Coached by: João Neto

Achievements and titles
- Olympic Games: 5th (2020)
- World Champ.: 5th (2018, 2024)
- European Champ.: (silver) (2022, 2023, 2025)
Medal record
Women's judo
Representing Portugal
European Championships
Silver medal – second place	2022 Sofia	‍–‍48 kg
Silver medal – second place	2023 Montpellier	‍–‍48 kg
Silver medal – second place	2025 Podgorica	‍–‍48 kg
Bronze medal – third place	2024 Zagreb	‍–‍48 kg
World Masters
Bronze medal – third place	2022 Jerusalem	‍–‍48 kg
IJF Grand Slam
Gold medal – first place	2019 Brasilia	‍–‍48 kg
Silver medal – second place	2023 Tashkent	‍–‍48 kg
Bronze medal – third place	2019 Düsseldorf	‍–‍48 kg
Bronze medal – third place	2019 Baku	‍–‍48 kg
Bronze medal – third place	2019 Abu Dhabi	‍–‍48 kg
Bronze medal – third place	2021 Abu Dhabi	‍–‍48 kg
Bronze medal – third place	2023 Ulaanbaatar	‍–‍48 kg
Bronze medal – third place	2023 Tokyo	‍–‍48 kg
IJF Grand Prix
Gold medal – first place	2018 Antalya	‍–‍48 kg
Gold medal – first place	2022 Almada	‍–‍48 kg
Silver medal – second place	2018 Agadir	‍–‍48 kg
Silver medal – second place	2018 Cancún	‍–‍48 kg
Silver medal – second place	2019 Montreal	‍–‍48 kg
Bronze medal – third place	2026 Lima	‍–‍48 kg

Profile at external databases
- IJF: 13452
- JudoInside.com: 75232
- Updated on 15 August 2026

Catarina Martins de Mesquita Paiva Costa (born 21 September 1996) is a Portuguese judoka.

She is the gold medallist of the 2019 Judo Grand Slam Brasilia and represented Portugal at the 2020 Summer Olympics in Tokyo.

At the 2021 Judo Grand Slam Abu Dhabi held in Abu Dhabi, United Arab Emirates, she won a bronze medal in the women's under-48 kg category.
