= Shlomo Group Arena =

Sports and events arena in Tel Aviv, israel

Coordinates: 32.1092°N 34.8108°E

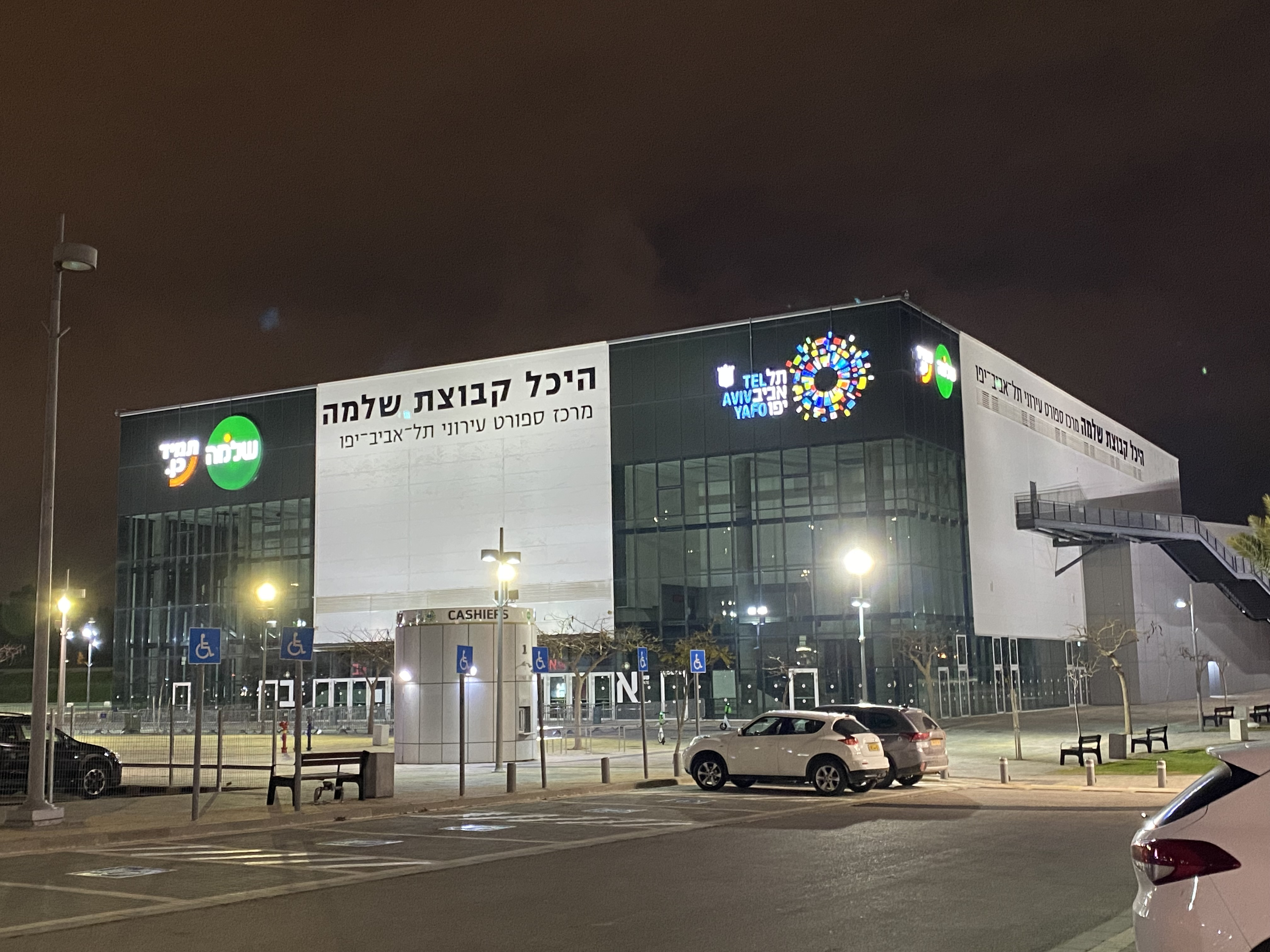
- Interactive map of Shlomo Group Arena
- Address: 7 Isaac Remba Street
- Location: Tel Aviv, Israel
- Owner: Tel Aviv-Yafo Municipality
- Operator: Sport Palaces Tel Aviv Yafo Ltd.
- Capacity: 3,504
- Surface: Parquet
- Public transit: Coastal Railway Line at Tel Aviv University

Construction
- Groundbreaking: March 2013
- Opened: November 2014
- Cost: ₪92 million €20 million

Tenants
- Hapoel Tel Aviv (2014–2025); Israel men's national basketball team Israel men's national handball team Israel women's national basketball team: Major sporting events hosted; Judo Grand Slam Tel Aviv

Website
- www.sportpalace.co.il/tlv-faclities/sport-halls/shlomo-group-hall

The Drive in Arena (Hebrew: היכל הדרייב אין), officially named Shlomo Group Arena (Hebrew: היכל קבוצת שלמה), is a multi-purpose hall in the northern part of Tel Aviv, Israel. Built on the grounds of what was once Israel's only drive-in theater and opened in November 2014, it is used primarily as the home arena for the basketball team Hapoel Tel Aviv.

== Features ==
The building has an area about of 6,600 square metres (71,000 ft^{2}) and is accessible for the disabled. The hall has 3,504 seats, 300 of which are collapsible to allow the facility to host volleyball and handball games.

The hall also accommodates concerts and conferences. It features red and white chairs and blue plaid pattern. Besides the hall of the building, there are four dressing rooms, a gym, a dressing room for officials, press rooms, a VIP lounge and an entryway with glass fronts.

== Background ==
In July 2007, Ron Huldai, the mayor of Tel Aviv decided to demolish Ussishkin Arena, the arena of Hapoel Tel Aviv basketball team. Despite fans' protest and struggle to save it, it was eventually demolished.

Hapoel fell apart, and was re-established by its fans and was in the lowest league, playing in the replacement arena. When Hapoel returned to the first league, the mayor decided to build a new arena, so that Hapoel would not have to travel every year. Excitement increased among fans, and on January 4, 2015, Hapoel played for the first time in its new arena against Hapoel Jerusalem and won, 81–67.

It hosted preliminary and quarter-final matches for the 2023 FIBA Women's EuroBasket.

== Gallery ==
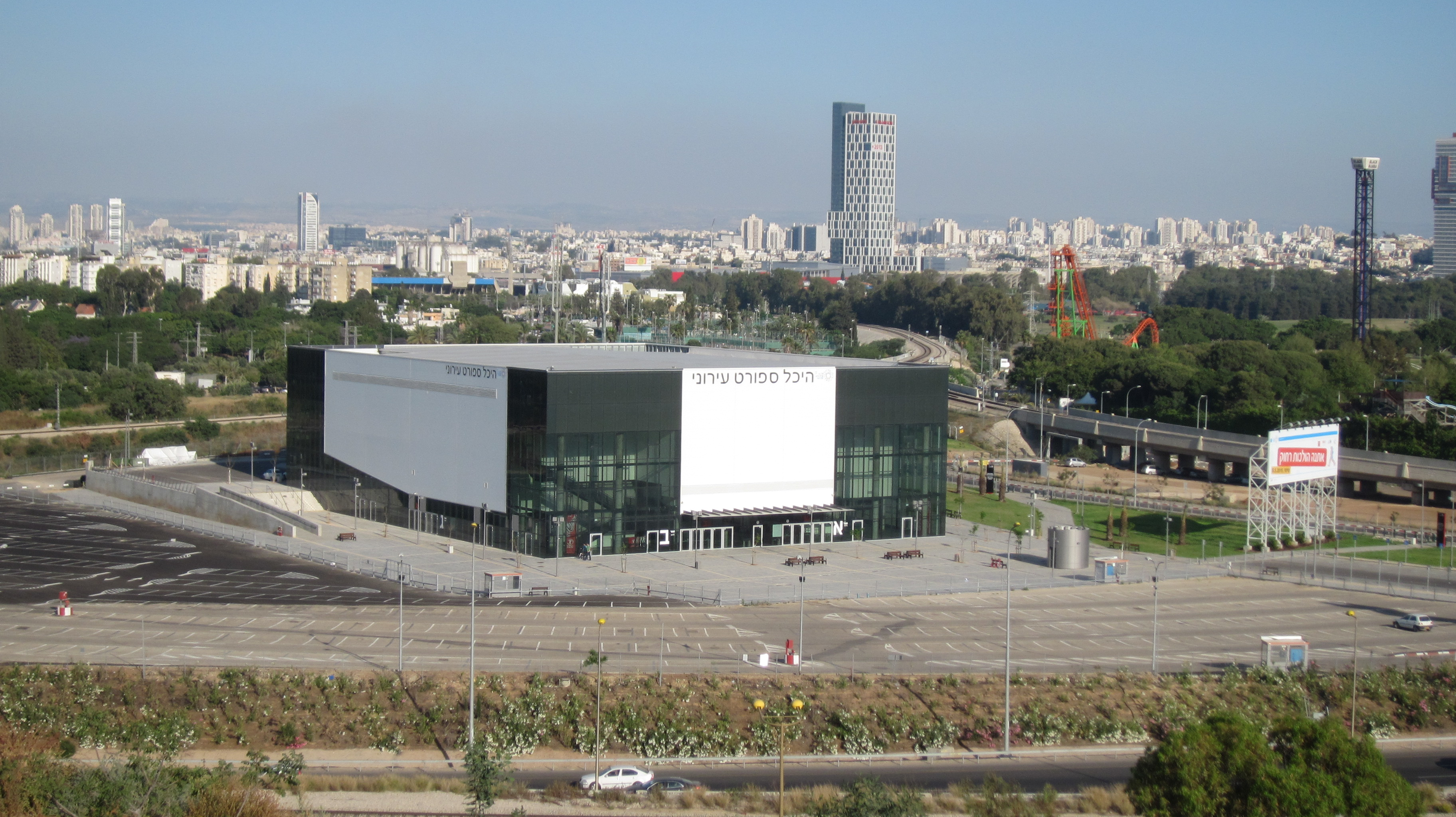

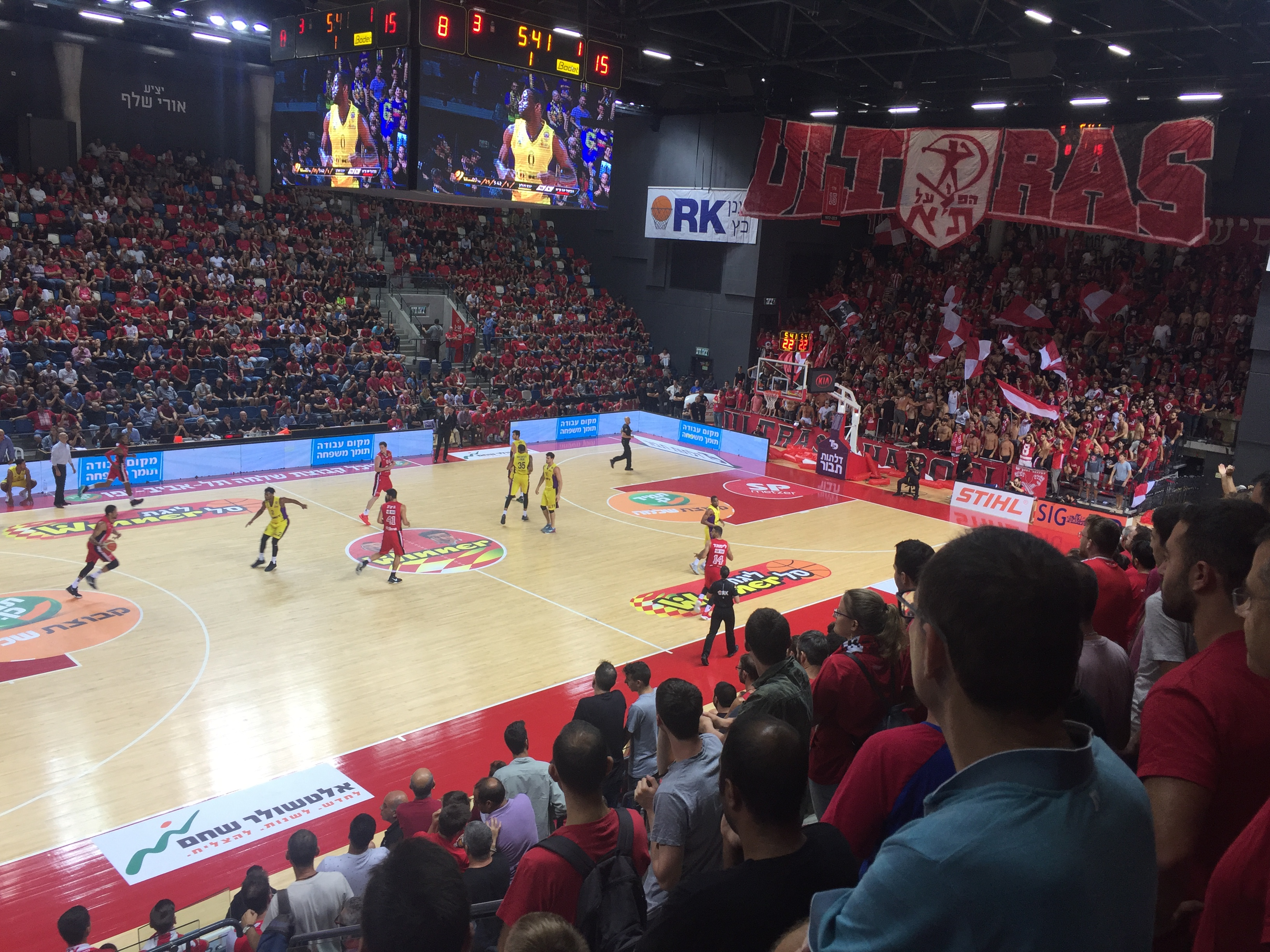

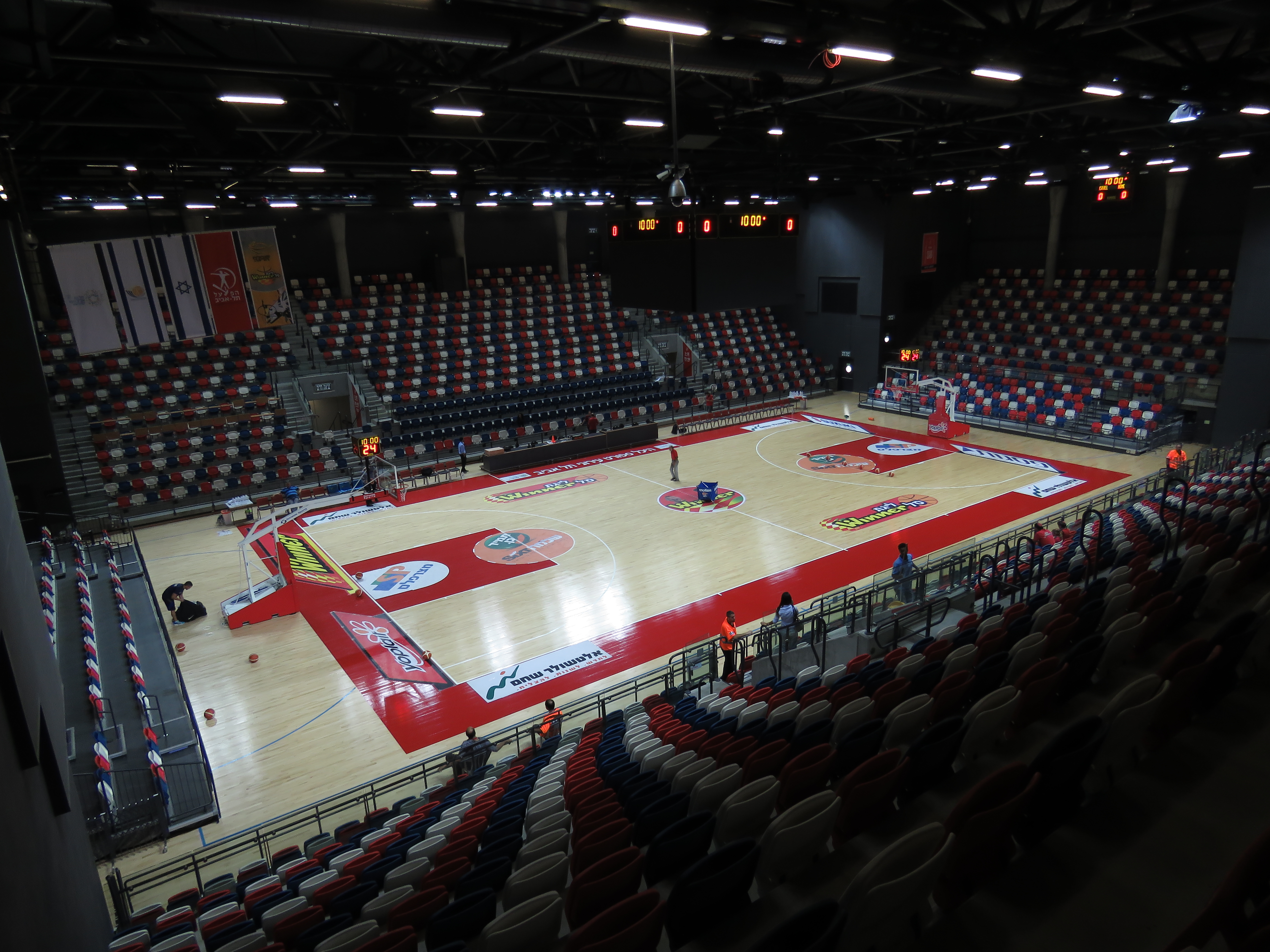

== See also ==
- List of indoor arenas in Israel
- Basketball in Israel
