= Andrea Stojadinov =

Serbian judoka (born 2000)

Personal information
- Native name: Андреа Стојадинов
- Born: 20 June 2000 (age 26)
- Occupation: Judoka
- Height: 162 cm (5 ft 4 in)

Sport
- Country: Serbia
- Sport: Judo
- Weight class: ‍–‍48 kg
- Club: Red Star

Achievements and titles
- World Champ.: R32 (2024)
- European Champ.: (silver) (2020)
Medal record
Women's judo
Representing Serbia
European Championships
Silver medal – second place	2020 Prague	‍–‍48 kg
Bronze medal – third place	2024 Zagreb	Mixed team
Bronze medal – third place	2025 Podgorica	‍–‍48 kg
IJF Grand Slam
Gold medal – first place	2023 Tashkent	‍–‍48 kg
Silver medal – second place	2023 Tbilisi	‍–‍48 kg
Silver medal – second place	2024 Abu Dhabi	‍–‍48 kg
Bronze medal – third place	2020 Budapest	‍–‍48 kg
Bronze medal – third place	2021 Tel Aviv	‍–‍48 kg
Bronze medal – third place	2021 Tashkent	‍–‍48 kg
Bronze medal – third place	2025 Baku	‍–‍48 kg
IJF Grand Prix
Bronze medal – third place	2023 Dushanbe	‍–‍48 kg
Bronze medal – third place	2025 Zagreb	‍–‍48 kg
European U23 Championships
Gold medal – first place	2018 Győr	‍–‍48 kg
Gold medal – first place	2021 Budapest	‍–‍48 kg
Silver medal – second place	2017 Podgorica	‍–‍48 kg
Bronze medal – third place	2019 Izhevsk	‍–‍48 kg
Bronze medal – third place	2020 Poreč	‍–‍48 kg
World Juniors Championships
Bronze medal – third place	2018 Nassau	‍–‍48 kg
Bronze medal – third place	2019 Marrakesh	‍–‍48 kg
European Junior Championships
Gold medal – first place	2020 Poreč	‍–‍48 kg
European Cadet Championships
Silver medal – second place	2017 Kaunas	‍–‍48 kg
Bronze medal – third place	2016 Vantaa	‍–‍48 kg
European Youth Olympic Festival
Gold medal – first place	2017 Győr	‍–‍48 kg
Bronze medal – third place	2017 Győr	Women's team
Mediterranean Games
Bronze medal – third place	2026 Taranto	‍–‍52 kg

Profile at external databases
- IJF: 19724
- JudoInside.com: 95233
- Updated on 1 September 2026

Andrea Stojadinov (Serbian Cyrillic: Андреа Стојадинов; born 20 June 2000) is a Serbian judoka. She won the silver medal in the women's 48 kg event at the 2020 European Judo Championships held in Prague, Czech Republic.

== Career ==
Stojadinov represented Serbia at the 2018 Mediterranean Games held in Tarragona, Catalonia, Spain. In that same year, she won the gold medal in the women's 48 kg event at the 2018 European U23 Judo Championships held in Győr, Hungary. A year later, she won one of the bronze medals in this event at the 2019 European U23 Judo Championships held in Izhevsk, Russia.

In 2019, Stojadinov represented Serbia at the European Games held in Minsk, Belarus. She competed in the women's 48 kg event where she was eliminated in her second match by Maruša Štangar of Slovenia. Štangar went on to win one of the bronze medals. A year later, she won one of the bronze medals in the women's 48 kg event at the 2020 Judo Grand Slam Hungary held in Budapest, Hungary. She won silver medal at the European Championship in Prague in same category.

In 2021, Stojadinov competed in the women's 48 kg event at the Judo World Masters held in Doha, Qatar. A month later, she won one of the bronze medals in her event at the 2021 Judo Grand Slam Tel Aviv held in Tel Aviv, Israel. In 2025 she won her second European Championship individual medal, a bronze in Podgorica.

== Achievements ==
Year	Tournament	Place	Weight class
2021	Grand Slam Tashkent	3rd	−48 kg
2021	Grand Slam Tel Aviv	3rd	−48 kg
2020	European Championships	2nd	−48 kg
2020	European U23 Championships	3rd	−48 kg
2020	European Junior Championships	1st	−48 kg
2020	Grand Slam Budapest	3rd	−48 kg
2019	European U23 Championships	3rd	−48 kg
2019	World Junior Championships	3rd	−48 kg
2018	European U23 Championships	1st	−48 kg
2018	World Junior Championships	3rd	−48 kg
2017	European U23 Championships	2nd	−48 kg
2017	European Youth Olympic Festival	1st	−48 kg
2017	European Cadet Championships	2nd	−48 kg
2016	European Cadet Championships	3rd	−48 kg
