= Laura Martínez (judoka) =

Spanish judoka (born 1998)

Personal information
- Full name: Laura Martínez Abelenda
- Nationality: Spanish
- Born: 1 December 1998 (age 27)
- Occupation: Judoka

Sport
- Country: Spain
- Sport: Judo
- Weight class: ‍–‍48 kg

Achievements and titles
- Olympic Games: 5th (2024)
- World Champ.: (bronze) (2025)
- European Champ.: (bronze) (2023, 2026)
Medal record
Women's judo
Representing Spain
World Championships
Bronze medal – third place	2025 Budapest	‍–‍48 kg
European Championships
Bronze medal – third place	2023 Montpellier	‍–‍48 kg
Bronze medal – third place	2026 Tbilisi	‍–‍48 kg
IJF Grand Slam
Gold medal – first place	2019 Baku	‍–‍48 kg
Gold medal – first place	2025 Abu Dhabi	‍–‍48 kg
Silver medal – second place	2022 Tbilisi	‍–‍48 kg
Silver medal – second place	2023 Astana	‍–‍48 kg
Silver medal – second place	2026 Lausanne	‍–‍48 kg
Bronze medal – third place	2019 Brasilia	‍–‍48 kg
Bronze medal – third place	2024 Paris	‍–‍48 kg
Bronze medal – third place	2026 Ulaanbaatar	‍–‍48 kg
IJF Grand Prix
Silver medal – second place	2023 Linz	‍–‍48 kg
Bronze medal – third place	2022 Zagreb	‍–‍48 kg
Bronze medal – third place	2023 Zagreb	‍–‍48 kg
Bronze medal – third place	2026 Linz	‍–‍48 kg
European U23 Championships
Bronze medal – third place	2016 Tel Aviv	‍–‍48 kg
World Juniors Championships
Silver medal – second place	2017 Zagreb	‍–‍48 kg
Bronze medal – third place	2018 Nassau	‍–‍48 kg
European Junior Championships
Silver medal – second place	2017 Maribor	‍–‍48 kg
Bronze medal – third place	2018 Sofia	‍–‍48 kg

Profile at external databases
- IJF: 17143
- JudoInside.com: 13237
- Updated on 1 September 2026

Laura Martínez Abelenda (Note: In this Spanish name, the first or paternal surname is Martínez and the second or maternal family name is Abelenda.) (born 1 December 1998) is a Spanish judoka.

Martínez is the gold medallist of the 2019 Judo Grand Slam Baku in the ‍–‍48 kg category.

Martínez represented Spain at the 2024 Summer Olympics in Paris, France. She lost her bronze medal match in the women's 48 kg event.
