= 2023 World Judo Championships – Women's 48 kg =

Judo competition

Judo Women's 48 kg at the 2023 World Judo Championships
- Venue: Ali Bin Hamad Al Attiya Arena
- Location: Doha, Qatar
- Date: 7 May 2023
- Competitors: 45 from 34 nations
- Total prize money: €57,000

Medalists
gold medal	Natsumi Tsunoda (3rd title)	Japan
silver medal	Shirine Boukli	France
bronze medal	Wakana Koga	Japan
bronze medal	Assunta Scutto	Italy

Competition at external databases
- Links: IJF • JudoInside

The Women's 48 kg event at the 2023 World Judo Championships was held at the Ali Bin Hamad al-Attiyah Arena in Doha, Qatar on 7 May 2023.

== Results ==
=== Finals ===
Semi-finals
(France) Shirine Boukli	02
(Kazakhstan) Abiba Abuzhakynova	00
(Japan) Natsumi Tsunoda	11
(France) Blandine Pont	00

Final
(France) Shirine Boukli	00
(Japan) Natsumi Tsunoda	10

=== Repechage ===
Repechage
(Japan) Wakana Koga	10
(Serbia) Milica Nikolić	00
(Italy) Assunta Scutto	02
(Brazil) Amanda Lima	00

Bronze medal
(Japan) Wakana Koga	11
(France) Blandine Pont	00
(Italy) Assunta Scutto	01
(Kazakhstan) Abiba Abuzhakynova	00

=== Pool A ===
First round
(Czech Republic) Tereza Bodnárová	02
(Brazil) Natasha Ferreira	01
(Mexico) Edna Carrillo	00
(China) Guo Zongying	10
(Italy) Francesca Milani	10
(Gabon) Virginia Aymard	00

Round of 32
(France) Shirine Boukli	01
(Spain) Laura Martínez	00
(Czech Republic) Tereza Bodnárová	00
(Malta) Katryna Esposito	10
(Japan) Wakana Koga	10
(China) Guo Zongying	00
(Italy) Francesca Milani	11
(Belgium) Ellen Salens	00

Round of 16
(France) Shirine Boukli	10
(Malta) Katryna Esposito	00
(Japan) Wakana Koga	10
(Italy) Francesca Milani	00

Quarter-finals
(France) Shirine Boukli	01
(Japan) Wakana Koga	00

=== Pool B ===
First round
(Argentina) Keisy Perafán	00
(Uzbekistan) Khalimajon Kurbonova	02
(Portugal) Raquel Brito	02
(Turkmenistan) Aksoltan Hojageldiýewa	00
(Israel) Tamar Malca	01
(Chinese Taipei) Lin Chen-hao	00
(Chile) Mary Dee Vargas	00
(Mongolia) Bavuudorjiin Baasankhüü	10

Round of 32
(Serbia) Milica Nikolić	10
(Uzbekistan) Khalimajon Kurbonova	00
(Portugal) Raquel Brito	01
(Azerbaijan) Leyla Aliyeva	00
(Kazakhstan) Abiba Abuzhakynova	01
(Israel) Tamar Malca	00
(Mongolia) Bavuudorjiin Baasankhüü	11
(Burundi) Signoline Kanyamuneza	00

Round of 16
(Serbia) Milica Nikolić	01
(Portugal) Raquel Brito	00
(Kazakhstan) Abiba Abuzhakynova	01
(Mongolia) Bavuudorjiin Baasankhüü	00

Quarter-finals
(Serbia) Milica Nikolić	00
(Kazakhstan) Abiba Abuzhakynova	02

=== Pool C ===
First round
(Germany) Katharina Menz	10
(Mauritius) Priscilla Morand	00
(Serbia) Andrea Stojadinov	01
(Spain) Mireia Lapuerta Comas	10
(Slovenia) Maruša Štangar	10
(South Africa) Geronay Whitebooi	00

Round of 32
(Japan) Natsumi Tsunoda	10
(United States) Maria Celia Laborde	00
(Germany) Katharina Menz	01
(Sweden) Tara Babulfath	00
(Italy) Assunta Scutto	02
(Spain) Mireia Lapuerta Comas	00
(Slovenia) Maruša Štangar	10
(Israel) Shira Rishony	00

Round of 16
(Japan) Natsumi Tsunoda	02
(Germany) Katharina Menz	00
(Italy) Assunta Scutto	02
(Slovenia) Maruša Štangar	00

Quarter-finals
(Japan) Natsumi Tsunoda	11
(Italy) Assunta Scutto	00

=== Pool D ===
First round
(Kazakhstan) Galiya Tynbayeva	10
(Azerbaijan) Konul Aliyeva	00
(Brazil) Amanda Lima	02
(Guatemala) Jacqueline Solís	00
(Tunisia) Oumaima Bedioui	00
(Mongolia) Ganbaataryn Narantsetseg	10

Round of 32
(France) Blandine Pont	02
Sabina Giliazova	00
(Kazakhstan) Galiya Tynbayeva	10
(South Korea) Lee Hye-kyeong	00
(Portugal) Catarina Costa	00
(Brazil) Amanda Lima	01
(Mongolia) Ganbaataryn Narantsetseg	02
(Austria) Katharina Tanzer	00

Round of 16
(France) Blandine Pont	01
(Kazakhstan) Galiya Tynbayeva	00
(Brazil) Amanda Lima	10
(Mongolia) Ganbaataryn Narantsetseg	00

Quarter-finals
(France) Blandine Pont	10
(Brazil) Amanda Lima	00

== Prize money ==
The sums listed bring the total prizes awarded to €57,000 for the individual event.

Medal	Total	Judoka	Coach
Gold	€26,000	€20,800	€5,200
Silver	€15,000	€12,000	€3,000
Bronze	€8,000	€6,400	€1,600
