= 2022 World Judo Championships – Women's 48 kg =

Judo competition

Judo Women's 48 kg at the 2022 World Judo Championships
- Venue: Humo Ice Dome
- Location: Tashkent, Uzbekistan
- Date: 6 October
- Competitors: 38 from 31 nations
- Total prize money: €57,000

Medalists
gold medal	Natsumi Tsunoda (2nd title)	Japan
silver medal	Katharina Menz	Germany
bronze medal	Assunta Scutto	Italy
bronze medal	Abiba Abuzhakynova	Kazakhstan

Competition at external databases
- Links: IJF • JudoInside

The Women's 48 kg event at the 2022 World Judo Championships was held at the Humo Ice Dome arena in Tashkent, Uzbekistan on 6 October 2022.

== Results ==
=== Finals ===
Semi-finals
(Kazakhstan) Abiba Abuzhakynova	00
(Japan) Natsumi Tsunoda	10
(Germany) Katharina Menz	01
(Spain) Julia Figueroa	00

Final
(Japan) Natsumi Tsunoda	11
(Germany) Katharina Menz	00

=== Repechage ===
Repechage
~~(Serbia) Milica Nikolić~~
(Italy) Assunta Scutto	w/o
(Chile) Mary Dee Vargas	w/o
~~(Japan) Funa Tonaki~~

Bronze medal
(Italy) Assunta Scutto	11
(Spain) Julia Figueroa	00
(Chile) Mary Dee Vargas	00
(Kazakhstan) Abiba Abuzhakynova	10

=== Pool A ===
First round
(Dominican Republic) Estefanía Soriano	00
(Belgium) Ellen Salens	01

Round of 32
(France) Shirine Boukli	10
(Belgium) Ellen Salens	00
(Brazil) Amanda Lima	01
(Kazakhstan) Abiba Abuzhakynova	10
(Serbia) Milica Nikolić	10
(Romania) Alexandra Pop	00
(United States) Giovanna Prado	00
(Mongolia) Bavuudorjiin Baasankhüü	01

Round of 16
(France) Shirine Boukli	00
(Kazakhstan) Abiba Abuzhakynova	01
(Serbia) Milica Nikolić	10
(Mongolia) Bavuudorjiin Baasankhüü	00

Quarter-finals
(Kazakhstan) Abiba Abuzhakynova	10
(Serbia) Milica Nikolić	00

=== Pool B ===
First round
(Mauritius) Priscilla Morand	00
(Chinese Taipei) Lin Chen-hao	10
(Tunisia) Oumaima Bedioui	00
(Spain) Laura Martínez	01

Round of 32
(Israel) Shira Rishony	00
(Italy) Assunta Scutto	10
(Turkey) Merve Azak	00
(Uzbekistan) Khalimajon Kurbonova	10
(Japan) Natsumi Tsunoda	10
(Chinese Taipei) Lin Chen-hao	00
(China) Guo Zongying	00
(Spain) Laura Martínez	10

Round of 16
(Italy) Assunta Scutto	10
(Uzbekistan) Khalimajon Kurbonova	00
(Japan) Natsumi Tsunoda	11
(Spain) Laura Martínez	00

Quarter-finals
(Italy) Assunta Scutto	00
(Japan) Natsumi Tsunoda	11

=== Pool C ===
First round
(Mozambique) ~~Jennie Muneme~~	00
(Germany) Katharina Menz	w/o

Round of 32
(Portugal) Catarina Costa	00
(Germany) Katharina Menz	01
(Austria) Katharina Tanzer	00
(Italy) Francesca Milani	10
(Mongolia) Ganbaataryn Narantsetseg	00
(United States) Maria Celia Laborde	10
(Chile) Mary Dee Vargas	10
(Turkmenistan) Aksoltan Hojageldiýewa	00

Round of 16
(Germany) Katharina Menz	10
(Italy) Francesca Milani	00
(United States) Maria Celia Laborde	00
(Chile) Mary Dee Vargas	11

Quarter-finals
(Germany) Katharina Menz	01
(Chile) Mary Dee Vargas	00

=== Pool D ===
First round
(China) Liu Ting	10
(Serbia) Andrea Stojadinov	00
(Israel) Tamar Malca	00
(Slovenia) Maruša Štangar	01

Round of 32
(Japan) Funa Tonaki	10
(China) Liu Ting	00
(Slovenia) Maruša Štangar	00
(Turkey) Tuğçe Beder	01
(Spain) Julia Figueroa	01
(Azerbaijan) Leyla Aliyeva	00
(South Korea) Lee Hye-kyeong	10
(Burundi) Signoline Kanyamuneza	00

Round of 16
(Japan) Funa Tonaki	10
(Turkey) Tuğçe Beder	00
(Spain) Julia Figueroa	10
(South Korea) Lee Hye-kyeong	00

Quarter-finals
(Japan) Funa Tonaki	00
(Spain) Julia Figueroa	10
