= 2026 World Judo Championships – Women's 48 kg =

Judo competition

Judo Women's 48 kg at the 2026 World Judo Championships
- Venue: National Gymnastics Arena
- Location: Baku, Azerbaijan
- Date: 4 October 2026
- Competitors: 38 from 29 nations
- Total prize money: €57,000

Medalists
gold medal	Wakana Koga (1st title)	Japan
silver medal	Assunta Scutto	Italy
bronze medal	Shirine Boukli	France
bronze medal	Sabina Giliazova	Russia

Competition at external databases
- Links: IJF

The women's 48 kg event at the 2026 World Judo Championships was held at the National Gymnastics Arena in Baku, Azerbaijan on 4 October 2026.

== Results ==
=== Finals ===
Semi-finals
(Italy) Assunta Scutto	100
(Russia) Marina Vorobeva	000 (yellow card)
(Mongolia) Bavuudorjiin Baasankhüü	000
(Japan) Wakana Koga	010 (yellow card)

Final
(Italy) Assunta Scutto	000
(Japan) Wakana Koga	101

=== Repechage ===
Repechage
(Brazil) Clarice Ribeiro	001
(France) Shirine Boukli	010 (yellow card)
(Germany) Sarah Ischt	000 (yellow card)
(Russia) Sabina Giliazova	100

Bronze medal
(France) Shirine Boukli	100
(Mongolia) Bavuudorjiin Baasankhüü	000
(Russia) Sabina Giliazova	100
(Russia) Marina Vorobeva	000

=== Pool A ===
First round
(Kazakhstan) Abiba Abuzhakynova	001
(Turkey) Merve Azak	101

Round of 32
(China) Hui Xinran	000
(Italy) Assunta Scutto	001
(Turkey) Merve Azak	100
(Spain) Eva Pérez Soler	000 (yellow card)
(Mongolia) Jamsrangiin Anudari	000 (yellow card)
(Brazil) Clarice Ribeiro	010 (yellow card)
(Paraguay) Gabriela Narváez	001
(India) Asmita Dey	000 (yellow card)

Round of 16
(Italy) Assunta Scutto	100 (yellow card)
(Turkey) Merve Azak	000
(Brazil) Clarice Ribeiro	100
(Paraguay) Gabriela Narváez	000

Quarter-finals
(Italy) Assunta Scutto	100
(Brazil) Clarice Ribeiro	000

=== Pool B ===
First round
(Madagascar) Natacha Razafindrakalo	110
(Azerbaijan) Shafag Hamidova	000
(Belgium) Victoria Sibille	001 (yellow card)
(Malta) Katryna Esposito	000 (yellow card)

Round of 32
(China) Zhuang Wenna	020
(Madagascar) Natacha Razafindrakalo	000
(Hong Kong) Wong Ka Lee	000
(Russia) Marina Vorobeva	100
(France) Shirine Boukli	101 (yellow card)
(Burundi) Signoline Kanyamuneza	000
(Belgium) Victoria Sibille	000 (yellow card)
(Portugal) Catarina Costa	010 (yellow card)

Round of 16
(China) Zhuang Wenna	000 (yellow card)
(Russia) Marina Vorobeva	010
(France) Shirine Boukli	100 (yellow card)
(Portugal) Catarina Costa	000

Quarter-finals
(Russia) Marina Vorobeva	100
(France) Shirine Boukli	000

=== Pool C ===
First round
(Uzbekistan) Ulbusin Khakimova	101 (yellow card)
(Serbia) Natalija Prolić	000
(Kazakhstan) Galiya Tynbayeva	100
(Chinese Taipei) Lin Chen-hao	000

Round of 32
(Spain) Laura Martínez	000
(Turkey) Tuğçe Beder	100
(Uzbekistan) Ulbusin Khakimova	000 (yellow card)
(Germany) Sarah Ischt	001 (yellow card)
(United States) Maria Celia Laborde	100
(Sweden) Tara Babulfath	000 (yellow card)
(Kazakhstan) Galiya Tynbayeva	000 (yellow card)
(Mongolia) Bavuudorjiin Baasankhüü	002

Round of 16
(Turkey) Tuğçe Beder	000
(Germany) Sarah Ischt	001
(United States) Maria Celia Laborde	001
(Mongolia) Bavuudorjiin Baasankhüü	100

Quarter-finals
(Germany) Sarah Ischt	000
(Mongolia) Bavuudorjiin Baasankhüü	101 (yellow card)

=== Pool D ===
First round
(Slovakia) Patrícia Tománková	100 (yellow card)
(Belgium) Loïs Petit	000

Round of 32
(Russia) Sabina Giliazova	010 (yellow card)
(Slovakia) Patrícia Tománková	001
(Chile) Mary Dee Vargas	000
(Azerbaijan) Konul Aliyeva	100
(Japan) Wakana Koga	102
(Hong Kong) Lok Yi-ho	000
(Tunisia) Oumaima Bedioui	000
(Netherlands) Amber Gersjes	001

Round of 16
(Russia) Sabina Giliazova	100
(Azerbaijan) Konul Aliyeva	000
(Japan) Wakana Koga	101
(Netherlands) Amber Gersjes	000

Quarter-finals
(Russia) Sabina Giliazova	000
(Japan) Wakana Koga	102

== Prize money ==
The sums listed bring the total prizes awarded to €57,000 for the individual event.

Medal	Total	Judoka	Coach
Gold	€26,000	€20,800	€5,200
Silver	€15,000	€12,000	€3,000
Bronze	€8,000	€6,400	€1,600
