= 2024 World Judo Championships – Women's 48 kg =

Judo competition

Judo Women's 48 kg at the 2024 World Judo Championships
- Venue: Mubadala Arena
- Location: Abu Dhabi, United Arab Emirates
- Date: 19 May 2024
- Competitors: 48 from 37 nations
- Total prize money: €57,000

Medalists
gold medal	Bavuudorjiin Baasankhüü (1st title)	Mongolia
silver medal	Assunta Scutto	Italy
bronze medal	Abiba Abuzhakynova	Kazakhstan
bronze medal	Tara Babulfath	Sweden

Competition at external databases
- Links: IJF • JudoInside

The Women's 48 kg event at the 2024 World Judo Championships was held at the Mubadala Arena in Abu Dhabi, United Arab Emirates on 19 May 2024.

== Results ==
=== Finals ===
Semi-finals
(Italy) Assunta Scutto	01
(Sweden) Tara Babulfath	00
(Kazakhstan) Abiba Abuzhakynova	00 (yellow card)
(Mongolia) Bavuudorjiin Baasankhüü	02 (yellow card)

Final
(Italy) Assunta Scutto	00 (yellow card)
(Mongolia) Bavuudorjiin Baasankhüü	10

=== Repechage ===
Repechage
(Turkey) Tuğçe Beder	01 (yellow card)
(Mongolia) Ganbaataryn Narantsetseg	00
(Brazil) Natasha Ferreira	00
(Portugal) Catarina Costa	01 (yellow card)

Bronze medal
(Turkey) Tuğçe Beder	00 (yellow card)
(Kazakhstan) Abiba Abuzhakynova	02 (yellow card)
(Portugal) Catarina Costa	00 (yellow card)
(Sweden) Tara Babulfath	10

=== Pool A ===
First round
(Malta) Katryna Esposito	10 (yellow card)
(Israel) Tamar Malca	00
(Tunisia) Oumaima Bedioui	00
Sabina Giliazova	10
(Turkey) Tuğçe Beder	01
(Portugal) Raquel Brito	00
(Mauritius) Priscilla Morand	10
(Colombia) Erika Lasso	00

Round of 32
(Italy) Assunta Scutto	10
(Malta) Katryna Esposito	00
Sabina Giliazova	01 (yellow card)
(Belgium) Loïs Petit	00 (yellow card)
(South Korea) Lee Hye-kyeong	00 (yellow card)
(Turkey) Tuğçe Beder	02
(Mauritius) Priscilla Morand	00
(China) Guo Zongying	10

Round of 16
(Italy) Assunta Scutto	11
Sabina Giliazova	00 (yellow card)
(Turkey) Tuğçe Beder	01 (yellow card)
(China) Guo Zongying	00 (yellow card)

Quarter-finals
(Italy) Assunta Scutto	10 (yellow card)
(Turkey) Tuğçe Beder	01

=== Pool B ===
First round
(Hong Kong) Wong Ka Lee	00
(Mongolia) Ganbaataryn Narantsetseg	02 (yellow card)
(Chile) Mary Dee Vargas	00
(India) Swaita Swaita	10
(Brazil) Amanda Lima	00
(Kazakhstan) Galiya Tynbayeva	01
(Sweden) Tara Babulfath	10 (yellow card)
(Mexico) Edna Carrillo	00

Round of 32
(Serbia) Milica Nikolić	00 (yellow card)
(Mongolia) Ganbaataryn Narantsetseg	10
(India) Swaita Swaita	00
(Guatemala) Jacqueline Solís	11 (yellow card)
(Spain) Laura Martínez	01
(Kazakhstan) Galiya Tynbayeva	00
(Sweden) Tara Babulfath	10
(Austria) Katharina Tanzer	00

Round of 16
(Mongolia) Ganbaataryn Narantsetseg	10 (yellow card)
(Guatemala) Jacqueline Solís	00 (yellow card)
(Spain) Laura Martínez	00 (yellow card)
(Sweden) Tara Babulfath	01

Quarter-finals
(Mongolia) Ganbaataryn Narantsetseg	00 (yellow card)
(Sweden) Tara Babulfath	02 (yellow card)

=== Pool C ===
First round
(Turkey) Sıla Ersin	01
(Argentina) Keisy Perafán	00 (yellow card)
(Gabon) Virginia Aymard	00 (yellow card)
(Slovenia) Maruša Štangar	02 (yellow card)
(Turkmenistan) Kurbanaý Kurbanowa	00 (yellow card)
(Belgium) Ellen Salens	11
(Paraguay) Gabriela Narváez	00
(South Africa) Geronay Whitebooi	01 (yellow card)

Round of 32
(Kazakhstan) Abiba Abuzhakynova	11 (yellow card)
(Turkey) Sıla Ersin	01
(Slovenia) Maruša Štangar	10
(Serbia) Andrea Stojadinov	00
(Japan) Wakana Koga	10
(Belgium) Ellen Salens	00
(South Africa) Geronay Whitebooi	00 (yellow card)
(Brazil) Natasha Ferreira	10 (yellow card)

Round of 16
(Kazakhstan) Abiba Abuzhakynova	10
(Slovenia) Maruša Štangar	00
(Japan) Wakana Koga	00
(Brazil) Natasha Ferreira	10

Quarter-finals
(Kazakhstan) Abiba Abuzhakynova	11 (yellow card)
(Brazil) Natasha Ferreira	00

=== Pool D ===
First round
(United States) Maria Celia Laborde	02
(Burundi) Signoline Kanyamuneza	00
(Uzbekistan) Khalimajon Kurbonova	00
(Israel) Shira Rishony	01
(Azerbaijan) Leyla Aliyeva	01
Kristina Dudina	00 (yellow card)
(Chinese Taipei) Lin Chen-hao	11 (yellow card)
(Spain) Mireia Lapuerta Comas	00

Round of 32
(Mongolia) Bavuudorjiin Baasankhüü	10 (yellow card)
(United States) Maria Celia Laborde	00
(Israel) Shira Rishony	10
(India) Asmita Dey	01 (yellow card)
(Portugal) Catarina Costa	11 (yellow card)
(Azerbaijan) Leyla Aliyeva	00 (yellow card)
(Chinese Taipei) Lin Chen-hao	10
(Germany) Katharina Menz	00

Round of 16
(Mongolia) Bavuudorjiin Baasankhüü	10
(Israel) Shira Rishony	00
(Portugal) Catarina Costa	10
(Chinese Taipei) Lin Chen-hao	00

Quarter-finals
(Mongolia) Bavuudorjiin Baasankhüü	02
(Portugal) Catarina Costa	00

== Prize money ==
The sums listed bring the total prizes awarded to €57,000 for the individual event.

Medal	Total	Judoka	Coach
Gold	€26,000	€20,800	€5,200
Silver	€15,000	€12,000	€3,000
Bronze	€8,000	€6,400	€1,600
