= 2025 World Judo Championships – Women's 48 kg =

Judo competition

Judo Women's 48 kg at the 2025 World Judo Championships
- Venue: László Papp Budapest Sports Arena
- Location: Budapest, Hungary
- Date: 13 June 2025
- Competitors: 42 from 34 nations
- Total prize money: €57,000

Medalists
gold medal	Assunta Scutto (1st title)	Italy
silver medal	Abiba Abuzhakynova	Kazakhstan
bronze medal	Laura Martínez	Spain
bronze medal	Wakana Koga	Japan

Competition at external databases
- Links: IJF • JudoInside

The 2025 World Judo Championships was held at the László Papp Budapest Sports Arena in Budapest, Hungary on 13 June 2025.

== Results ==
=== Finals ===
Semi-finals
(Italy) Assunta Scutto	100
(France) Shirine Boukli	000 (yellow card)
(Spain) Laura Martínez	000
(Kazakhstan) Abiba Abuzhakynova	100

Final
(Italy) Assunta Scutto	101
(Kazakhstan) Abiba Abuzhakynova	000

=== Repechage ===
Repechage
(Chinese Taipei) Lin Chen-hao	000
(International Judo Federation) Sabina Giliazova	100 (yellow card)
(Sweden) Tara Babulfath	000 (yellow card)
(Japan) Wakana Koga	010 (yellow card)

Bronze medal
(International Judo Federation) Sabina Giliazova	000
(Spain) Laura Martínez	100
(Japan) Wakana Koga	001 (yellow card)
(France) Shirine Boukli	000 (yellow card)

=== Pool A ===
First round
(China) Hui Xinran	000 (yellow card)
(Mongolia) Ganbaataryn Narantsetseg	001
(Spain) Eva Pérez Soler	000 (yellow card)
(Hungary) Szabina Szeleczki	011

Round of 32
(Italy) Assunta Scutto	010 (yellow card)
(Chile) Mary Dee Vargas	000
(Mongolia) Ganbaataryn Narantsetseg	100
(Malta) Katryna Esposito	000
(Portugal) Catarina Costa	000 (yellow card)
(Hungary) Szabina Szeleczki	010 (yellow card)
(Senegal) Diakhou Sene Sonko	000 (yellow card)
(Chinese Taipei) Lin Chen-hao	101

Round of 16
(Italy) Assunta Scutto	001 (yellow card)
(Mongolia) Ganbaataryn Narantsetseg	000
(Hungary) Szabina Szeleczki	000
(Chinese Taipei) Lin Chen-hao	111 (yellow card)

Quarter-finals
(Italy) Assunta Scutto	100
(Chinese Taipei) Lin Chen-hao	000

=== Pool B ===
First round
(Azerbaijan) Konul Aliyeva	000 (yellow card)
(United States) Maria Celia Laborde	100
(Netherlands) Amber Gersjes	010
(Kazakhstan) Galiya Tynbayeva	000
(Hong Kong) Lok Yi-ho	000
(Turkey) Tuğçe Beder	100 (yellow card)

Round of 32
(France) Shirine Boukli	100
(Uzbekistan) Laziza Haydarova	000
(United States) Maria Celia Laborde	100
(India) Asmita Dey	000 (yellow card)
(International Judo Federation) Sabina Giliazova	010 (yellow card)
(Netherlands) Amber Gersjes	000
(Turkey) Tuğçe Beder	020
(Guatemala) Jacqueline Solís	000

Round of 16
(France) Shirine Boukli	100 (yellow card)
(United States) Maria Celia Laborde	000
(International Judo Federation) Sabina Giliazova	010 (yellow card)
(Turkey) Tuğçe Beder	000

Quarter-finals
(France) Shirine Boukli	110
(International Judo Federation) Sabina Giliazova	001

=== Pool C ===
First round
(Brazil) Natasha Ferreira	000 (yellow card)
(South Korea) Lee Kyeong-ha	100 (yellow card)
(Turkmenistan) Kurbanaý Kurbanowa	000
(Azerbaijan) Leyla Aliyeva	100

Round of 32
(Sweden) Tara Babulfath	001
(South Korea) Lee Kyeong-ha	000
(Germany) Sarah Ischt	001 (yellow card)
(Mexico) Edna Carrillo	000 (yellow card)
(Spain) Laura Martínez	010 (yellow card)
(Azerbaijan) Leyla Aliyeva	000 (yellow card)
(Vietnam) Hoàng Thị Tình	000
(Mongolia) Jamsrangiin Anudari	001 (yellow card)

Round of 16
(Sweden) Tara Babulfath	100
(Germany) Sarah Ischt	000
(Spain) Laura Martínez	001
(Mongolia) Jamsrangiin Anudari	000

Quarter-finals
(Sweden) Tara Babulfath	000 (yellow card)
(Spain) Laura Martínez	010

=== Pool D ===
First round
(Serbia) Andrea Stojadinov	000
(International Judo Federation) Marina Vorobeva	100
(Hong Kong) Wong Ka Lee	000
(Belgium) Loïs Petit	100
(Romania) Laura Bogdan	000
(Tunisia) Oumaima Bedioui	101

Round of 32
(Kazakhstan) Abiba Abuzhakynova	001
(International Judo Federation) Marina Vorobeva	000
(Belgium) Loïs Petit	100
(Uzbekistan) Khalimajon Kurbonova	000
(Japan) Wakana Koga	100
(Hungary) Rebeka Kőszegi	001
(Tunisia) Oumaima Bedioui	100
(Colombia) Erika Lasso	001

Round of 16
(Kazakhstan) Abiba Abuzhakynova	100 (yellow card)
(Belgium) Loïs Petit	000 (yellow card)
(Japan) Wakana Koga	100
(Tunisia) Oumaima Bedioui	000 (yellow card)

Quarter-finals
(Kazakhstan) Abiba Abuzhakynova	100
(Japan) Wakana Koga	002

== Prize money ==
The sums listed bring the total prizes awarded to €57,000 for the individual event.

Medal	Total	Judoka	Coach
Gold	€26,000	€20,800	€5,200
Silver	€15,000	€12,000	€3,000
Bronze	€8,000	€6,400	€1,600
