= 2022 European Judo Championships – Women's 48 kg =

Judo Women's 48 kg at the 2022 European Judo Championships
- Venue: Armeets Arena
- Location: Sofia, Bulgaria
- Date: 29 April
- Competitors: 21 from 13 nations

Medalists
| gold medal | Shirine Boukli (2nd title) | France |
| silver medal | Catarina Costa | Portugal |
| bronze medal | Shira Rishony | Israel |
| bronze medal | Julia Figueroa | Spain |

Competition at external databases
- Links: IJF • JudoInside

The women's 48 kg competition at the 2022 European Judo Championships was held on 29 April at the Armeets Arena.

== Results ==
=== Finals ===
Semi-finals
Shirine Boukli (FRA) | 10
Julia Figueroa (ESP) | 00
Catarina Costa (POR) | 01
Shira Rishony (ISR) | 00

Final
Shirine Boukli (FRA) | 01
Catarina Costa (POR) | 00

=== Repechage ===
Repechage
Andrea Stojadinov (SRB) | 00
Francesca Milani (ITA) | 01
Assunta Scutto (ITA) | 00
Milica Nikolić (SRB) | 10

Bronze medal
Francesca Milani (ITA) | 00
Shira Rishony (ISR) | 10
Milica Nikolić (SRB) | 00
Julia Figueroa (ESP) | 10

=== Pool A ===
First round
Ellen Belsalens (BEL) | 11
Aleksa Georgieva (BUL) | 00
Katharina Tanzer (AUT) | 10
Cristina Blanaru (MDA) | 01

Round of 16
Shirine Boukli (FRA) | 10
Ellen Belsalens (BEL) | 00
Andrea Stojadinov (SRB) | 10
Katharina Tanzer (AUT) | 00

Quarterfinals
Shirine Boukli (FRA) | 10
Andrea Stojadinov (SRB) | 00

=== Pool B ===
First round
Sıla Ersin (TUR) | 10
Amber Gersjes (NED) | 00

Round of 16
Julia Figueroa (ESP) | 10
Shafag Hamidova (AZE) | 00
Francesca Milani (ITA) | 01
Sıla Ersin (TUR) | 00

Quarterfinals
Julia Figueroa (ESP) | 10
Francesca Milani (ITA) | 00

=== Pool C ===
First round
Jacqueline Springer (AUT) | 00
Anastasiia Balaban (BUL) | 10

Round of 16
Catarina Costa (POR) | 10
Ramila Aliyeva (AZE) | 00
Assunta Scutto (ITA) | 10
Anastasiia Balaban (BUL) | 00

Quarterfinals
Catarina Costa (POR) | 10
Assunta Scutto (ITA) | 00

=== Pool D ===
First round
Mireia Lapuerta Comas (ESP) | 10
Merve Azak (TUR) | 00

Round of 16
Shira Rishony (ISR) | 01
Mireia Lapuerta Comas (ESP) | 00
Milica Nikolić (SRB) | 10
Ana Budescu (MDA) | 00

Quarterfinals
Shira Rishony (ISR) | 10
Milica Nikolić (SRB) | 00
