= Judo at the 2022 Asian Games – Women's 48 kg =

Judo competition

Judo Women's 48 kg at the 2022 Asian Games
- Venue: Xiaoshan Linpu Gymnasium
- Location: Hangzhou, China
- Date: 24 September 2023
- Competitors: 15 from 15 nations

Medalists
gold medal	Natsumi Tsunoda	Japan
silver medal	Abiba Abuzhakynova	Kazakhstan
bronze medal	Khalimajon Kurbonova	Uzbekistan
bronze medal	Guo Zongying	China

Competition at external databases
- Links: IJF • JudoInside

The women's 48 kilograms (Extra lightweight) competition in Judo at the 2022 Asian Games in Hangzhou was held on 24 September 2023 at the Xiaoshan Linpu Gymnasium.

In the final, Natsumi Tsunoda from Japan won the gold medal.

== Schedule ==
All times are China Standard Time (UTC+08:00)

Date	Time	Event
Sunday, 24 September 2023	10:00	Elimination round of 16
Sunday, 24 September 2023	10:00	Quarterfinals
Sunday, 24 September 2023	10:00	Repechage
Sunday, 24 September 2023	10:00	Semifinals
Sunday, 24 September 2023	16:00	Finals

== Results ==
=== Main bracket ===
Round of 16
Wong Ka Lee (HKG)	10
Pimngam Ngamluan (THA)	00
Guo Zongying (CHN)	10
Hoàng Thị Tình (VIE)	00
Khalimajon Kurbonova (UZB)	01
Kurbanaý Kurbanowa (TKM)	00 (yellow card)
Abiba Abuzhakynova (KAZ)	11
Leah Jhane Lopez (PHI)	00 (yellow card)
Lin Chen-hao (TPE)	00
Jon Su-song (PRK)	01 (yellow card)
Bavuudorjiin Baasankhüü (MGL)	10
Kesone Ouanvilay (LAO)	00
Lee Hye-kyeong (KOR)	10
Madina Qurbonzoda (TJK)	00

Quarter-finals
Natsumi Tsunoda (JPN)	11
Wong Ka Lee (HKG)	00 (yellow card)
Guo Zongying (CHN)	10
Khalimajon Kurbonova (UZB)	00
Abiba Abuzhakynova (KAZ)	01
Jon Su-song (PRK)	00
Bavuudorjiin Baasankhüü (MGL)	00
Lee Hye-kyeong (KOR)	10

Semi-finals
Natsumi Tsunoda (JPN)	10
Guo Zongying (CHN)	00
Abiba Abuzhakynova (Note: Lee was disqualified after slapping Abuzhakynova, her semifinal opponent. Her supposed opponent in the bronze medal match won the bronze by default.) (KAZ)	10 (yellow card)
~~Lee Hye-kyeong (KOR)~~	00X

Gold medal contest
Natsumi Tsunoda (JPN)	11 (yellow card)
Abiba Abuzhakynova (KAZ)	00

=== Repechage ===
Repechage
Wong Ka Lee (HKG)	00
Khalimajon Kurbonova (UZB)	10
Jon Su-song (PRK)	01
Bavuudorjiin Baasankhüü (MGL)	00 (yellow card)

Bronze medal contests
Khalimajon Kurbonova (UZB)	w/o
~~Lee Hye-kyeong (KOR)~~	00
Jon Su-song (PRK)	00
Guo Zongying (CHN)	10
