= Judo at the 2026 Asian Games – Women's 48 kg =

Judo competition

Judo Women's 48 kg at the 2026 Asian Games
- Venue: Aichi International Arena
- Location: Nagoya, Japan

Medalists
gold medal	Mitsuki Kondo	Japan
silver medal	Abiba Abuzhakynova	Kazakhstan
bronze medal	Ahliya Muminova	Tajikistan
bronze medal	Ganbaataryn Narantsetseg	Mongolia

The women's 48 kilograms (Extra lightweight) competition in Judo at the 2026 Asian Games in Nagoya was held on 30 September 2026 at the Aichi International Arena.

== Schedule ==
All times are Japan Standard Time (UTC+09:00)

Date	Time	Event
Wednesday, 30 September 2026	11:00	Elimination round of 16
Wednesday, 30 September 2026	11:00	Quarterfinals
Wednesday, 30 September 2026	11:00	Repechage
Wednesday, 30 September 2026	11:00	Semifinals
Wednesday, 30 September 2026	17:00	Finals

== Results ==
=== Main bracket ===
==== Final ====
Final
Mitsuki Kondo (JPN)	100
Abiba Abuzhakynova (KAZ)	000

==== Top half ====
Round of 16
~~Jung Su-jin (KOR)~~	DSQ
Ahliya Muminova (TJK)	w/o

Quarter-finals
Ganbaataryn Narantsetseg (MGL)	100
Ahliya Muminova (TJK)	000
Mitsuki Kondo (JPN)	001
Laziza Haydarova (UZB)	000 (yellow card)

Semi-finals
Ganbaataryn Narantsetseg (MGL)	000 (yellow card)
Mitsuki Kondo (JPN)	002

==== Bottom half ====
Round of 16
Wong Ka Lee (HKG)	100
Nisha Shrestha (NEP)	000
Asmita Dey (IND)	100 (yellow card)
Hà Ngọc Chi (VIE)	000

Quarter-finals
Lin Chen-hao (TPE)	001 (yellow card)
Wong Ka Lee (HKG)	000 (yellow card)
Abiba Abuzhakynova (KAZ)	100
Asmita Dey (IND)	000

Semi-finals
Lin Chen-hao (TPE)	000
Abiba Abuzhakynova (KAZ)	001

=== Repechage ===
Repechage
Ahliya Muminova (TJK)	001
Laziza Haydarova (UZB)	000
Wong Ka Lee (HKG)	000 (yellow card)
Asmita Dey (IND)	001 (yellow card)

Bronze medal
Ahliya Muminova (TJK)	001 (yellow card)
Lin Chen-hao (TPE)	000
Asmita Dey (IND)	000 (yellow card)
Ganbaataryn Narantsetseg (MGL)	010 (yellow card)
