= 2021 World Judo Championships – Women's 48 kg =

Judo competition

Judo Women's 48 kg at the 2021 World Judo Championships
- Venue: László Papp Budapest Sports Arena
- Location: Budapest, Hungary
- Date: 6 June
- Competitors: 42 from 30 nations
- Total prize money: 57,000€

Medalists
gold medal	Natsumi Tsunoda (1st title)	Japan
silver medal	Wakana Koga	Japan
bronze medal	Julia Figueroa	Spain
bronze medal	Mönkhbatyn Urantsetseg	Mongolia

Competition at external databases
- Links: IJF • JudoInside

The Women's 48 kg competition at the 2021 World Judo Championships was held on 6 June 2021.

== Results ==
=== Finals ===
Semi-finals
(Kosovo) Distria Krasniqi	00
(Japan) Natsumi Tsunoda	10
(Japan) Wakana Koga	01
(Spain) Julia Figueroa	00

Final
(Japan) Natsumi Tsunoda	10
(Japan) Wakana Koga	00

=== Repechage ===
Repechage
(Spain) Laura Martínez	00
(Argentina) Keisy Perafán	11

Third place
(Argentina) Keisy Perafán	00
(Spain) Julia Figueroa	10

Repechage
(Mongolia) Mönkhbatyn Urantsetseg	01
(France) Shirine Boukli	00

Third place
(Mongolia) Mönkhbatyn Urantsetseg	10
(Kosovo) Distria Krasniqi	00

=== Pool A ===
First round
(Hungary) Éva Csernoviczki	10
(Uzbekistan) Gulnur Muratbaeva	00
(Brazil) Gabriela Chibana	00
(Israel) Shira Rishony	01
(Chile) Mary Dee Vargas	10
(India) Shushila Likmabam	00

Second round
(Kosovo) Distria Krasniqi	10
(Hungary) Éva Csernoviczki	00
Sabina Giliazova	10
(Azerbaijan) Leyla Aliyeva	00
(Spain) Laura Martínez	01
(Israel) Shira Rishony	00
(Chile) Mary Dee Vargas	11
(Italy) Francesca Giorda	00

Third round
(Kosovo) Distria Krasniqi	01
Sabina Giliazova	00
(Spain) Laura Martínez	01
(Chile) Mary Dee Vargas	00

Quarterfinals
(Kosovo) Distria Krasniqi	11
(Spain) Laura Martínez	00

=== Pool B ===
First round
(Mongolia) Narantsetseg Ganbaatar	00
(Serbia) Milica Nikolić	10
(Kazakhstan) Abiba Abuzhakynova	01
(South Korea) Kang Yu-jeong	10

Second round
(France) Mélanie Clément	10
(Belgium) Loïs Petit	00
(Japan) Natsumi Tsunoda	10
(Serbia) Milica Nikolić	00
(Portugal) Catarina Costa	01
(South Africa) Geronay Whitebooi	00
(South Korea) Kang Yu-jeong	00
(Argentina) Keisy Perafán	10

Third round
(France) Mélanie Clément	00
(Japan) Natsumi Tsunoda	10
(Portugal) Catarina Costa	00
(Argentina) Keisy Perafán	01

Quarterfinals
(Japan) Natsumi Tsunoda	10
(Argentina) Keisy Perafán	00

=== Pool C ===
First round
(Hungary) Luca Mamira	00
(Kazakhstan) Otgontsetseg Galbadrak	10
(Japan) Wakana Koga	10
(Tajikistan) Shukrona Karchieva	00
(Turkey) Gülkader Şentürk	00
(Italy) Francesca Milani	10

Second round
(Mongolia) Mönkhbatyn Urantsetseg	11
(South Korea) Yeonju Oh	00
(Kazakhstan) Otgontsetseg Galbadrak	10
(Mauritius) Priscilla Morand	00
(Slovenia) Maruša Štangar	00
(Japan) Wakana Koga	10
(Tunisia) Oumaima Bedioui	00
(Italy) Francesca Milani	10

Third round
(Mongolia) Mönkhbatyn Urantsetseg	10
(Kazakhstan) Otgontsetseg Galbadrak	00
(Japan) Wakana Koga	10
(Italy) Francesca Milani	00

Quarterfinals
(Mongolia) Mönkhbatyn Urantsetseg	00
(Japan) Wakana Koga	11

=== Pool D ===
First round
(Romania) Monica Ungureanu	00
(Peru) Brillith Gamarra	01
(Morocco) Aziza Chakir	00
(Portugal) Maria Siderot	11

Second round
(Spain) Julia Figueroa	10
(Azerbaijan) Aisha Gurbanli	00
(Belgium) Anne-Sophie Jura	00
(Peru) Brillith Gamarra	10
(France) Shirine Boukli	10
(Portugal) Maria Siderot	00
Irena Khubulova	10
(Colombia) Luz Álvarez	00

Third round
(Spain) Julia Figueroa	10
(Peru) Brillith Gamarra	00
(France) Shirine Boukli	01
Irena Khubulova	00

Quarterfinals
(Spain) Julia Figueroa	01
(France) Shirine Boukli	00

== Prize money ==
The sums listed bring the total prizes awarded to 57,000€ for the individual event.

Medal	Total	Judoka	Coach
Gold	26,000€	20,800€	5,200€
Silver	15,000€	12,000€	3,000€
Bronze	8,000€	6,400€	1,600€
