= Shira Rishony =

Israeli judoka (born 1991)

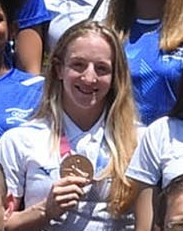
- Rishony in 2021

Personal information
- Native name: שירה ראשוני
- Born: 21 February 1991 (age 35) Holon, Israel
- Occupation: Judoka
- Height: 1.50 m (4 ft 11 in)
- Weight: 48 kg (106 lb)

Sport
- Country: Israel
- Sport: Judo
- Weight class: –48 kg
- Rank: 6th dan black belt
- Club: Netanya Gladiator Judo Club
- Coached by: Shany Hershko
- Retired: 31 August 2025

Achievements and titles
- Olympic Games: 5th (2020)
- World Champ.: R16 (2017, 2024)
- European Champ.: (bronze) (2022)
- Highest world ranking: 6^{th}
Medal record
Women's judo
Representing Israel
Olympic Games
Bronze medal – third place	2020 Tokyo	Mixed team
European Championships
Bronze medal – third place	2022 Sofia	‍–‍48 kg
IJF Grand Slam
Silver medal – second place	2023 Antalya	‍–‍48 kg
Bronze medal – third place	2015 Paris	‍–‍48 kg
Bronze medal – third place	2017 Baku	‍–‍48 kg
Bronze medal – third place	2019 Brasilia	‍–‍48 kg
Bronze medal – third place	2021 Antalya	‍–‍48 kg
Bronze medal – third place	2021 Baku	‍–‍48 kg
IJF Grand Prix
Gold medal – first place	2013 Tashkent	‍–‍48 kg
Gold medal – first place	2019 Tel Aviv	‍–‍48 kg
Silver medal – second place	2016 Havana	‍–‍48 kg
Silver medal – second place	2017 Antalya	‍–‍48 kg
Bronze medal – third place	2013 Almaty	‍–‍48 kg
Bronze medal – third place	2014 Jeju	‍–‍48 kg
Bronze medal – third place	2018 Hohhot	‍–‍48 kg
Bronze medal – third place	2019 Hohhot	‍–‍48 kg
Bronze medal – third place	2019 Montreal	‍–‍48 kg
Bronze medal – third place	2023 Almada	‍–‍48 kg
Maccabiah Games
Gold medal – first place	2009 Israel	‍–‍48 kg

Profile at external databases
- IJF: 1427
- JudoInside.com: 51705
- Updated on 31 August 2025

Shira Rishony (Hebrew: שירה ראשוני; born 21 February 1991) is an Israeli retired extra-lightweight judoka. She competes at ‍–‍48 kg (under 106 pounds). She competed for Israel at the 2016 Summer Olympics. At the 2020 Summer Olympics she won a bronze medal in the mixed team event, and placed 5th in the women's 48 kg event. She won a bronze medal at the 2022 European Championships. Rishony represented Israel at the 2024 Summer Olympics in judo; in the women's 48 kg she came in 17th, and in the mixed team event Team Israel came in ninth.

== Early and personal life ==
Rishony was born in Holon, Israel, and is Jewish. At the age of five, she was sent by her mother to learn ballet, despite her desire to learn judo. After two years, as she still insisted on learning judo, her mother finally gave in and allowed her to take part in the sport. Her sisters are named Rotem and Maya. Their grandfather is named Muki.

She resides in Even Yehuda, Israel, near the Wingate Institute. Rishony speaks Hebrew, English, and Spanish.

== Judo career ==
Her club is the Netanya Gladiator Judo Club in Israel.

=== Early years; Israeli Champion ===
Rishony won the Israel ‍–‍48 kg Women's Judo Championship in 2009 2012, 2017, 2019, and 2023, won the silver medal in the competition in 2014 and 2015, and won the bronze medal in 2007 and 2011.

In 2009, Rishony won gold medals in the 2009 Maccabiah Games, and the Junior Tour U20 Izmir 'Cehat Sener'.

In 2012, Rishony won the gold medal in the IJF World Cup Tashkent, and took the bronze medals in the World Cup Bucharest and the World Cup Istanbul. Rishony won the gold medal at the 2013 Tashkent Grand Prix, and a bronze medal at 2013 Almaty Grand Prix, but was injured in a competition in Germany and lost six months of training and competition.

In 2014, Rishony won the gold medal at the European Open in Tallinn, and bronze medals at the 2014 Jeju Grand Prix and the Pan American Open San Salvador. She won a bronze medal at the 2015 Grand Slam of Paris. In May, she finished in 5th place at the 2015 World Masters in Rabat.

Rishony won the silver medal at the 2016 Havana Grand Prix.

=== 2016 Rio Olympics ===
Rishony, ranked 20th in the world, competed for Israel at the 2016 Summer Olympics in women's 48 kg, taking the additional place of Europe. In her first bout she was deemed to have illegally touched her opponent's leg with her elbow in her match against Ukrainian Maryna Cherniak, and was disqualified for illegal use of her elbow at 2:10 of her first bout. After the loss, she admitted "I still don't understand why I was disqualified." In tears, Rishony said: "I'm still in shock, I felt I was ready and it hurts me that I couldn't give my all and that it all ended before it really began... I was surprised by the decision of the judge... It's hard to put in words how much you give and how much you sacrifice and how much you dream of this moment. You certainly don't imagine it ending like this."

=== 2017–19 ===
Rishony won a silver medal at the 2017 Antalya Grand Prix, and a bronze medal at the 2017 Baku Grand Slam. She won a gold medal in the New York Open Team Championships.

At the 2018 Hohhot Grand Prix, Rishony won a bronze medal.

At the 2019 Tel Aviv Grand Prix Rishony won the gold medal. Rishony also won bronze medals as the 2019 Hohhot Grand Prix, the 2019 Montreal Grand Prix, and the 2019 Brasilia Grand Slam.

=== 2020 Tokyo Olympics (in 2021) ===
Rishony represented Israel at the 2020 Summer Olympics, competing at the women's 48 kg weight category. In her first match, she beat Colombia's Luz Álvarez by ippon, advancing to the round of 16. There, she submitted Spaniard 2021 World Championships bronze medalist Julia Figueroa who was seeded 5th in the Olympics. In the Quarterfinals, Rishony lost to former world champion, Mongolian Mönkhbatyn Urantsetseg, moving her to compete for a chance to win bronze through the Repechage. There, Rishont beat Taiwanese Lin Chen-hao, advancing to fight for the bronze medal. She lost the bronze medal match to Ukrainian former two-times world champion Daria Bilodid, finishing in fifth place.

=== 2021–present; European championships bronze medal ===
Rishony won bronze medals as the 2021 Antalya Grand Slam and the 2021 Baku Grand Slam.

At the 2022 European Championships in Sofia, Rishony won a bronze medal.

At the 2023 Antalya Grand Slam, Rishony won a silver medal, and at the 2023 Almada Grand Prix she won a bronze medal.

=== 2024 Paris Olympics ===
Rishony represent Israel at the 2024 Summer Olympics in judo; in the women's 48 kg she came in 17th, as she lost 00–01 in the round of 32 to 2024 world championship bronze medalist Abiba Abuzhakynova of Kazakhstan. In the mixed team event, she and Team Israel came in ninth.

== Titles ==
Year	Tournament	Place	Ref.
2013	Grand Prix Almaty	3rd place, bronze medalist(s)	
2013	Grand Prix Tashkent	1st place, gold medalist(s)	
2014	Grand Prix Jeju	3rd place, bronze medalist(s)	
2015	Grand Slam Paris	3rd place, bronze medalist(s)	
2016	Grand Prix Havana	2nd place, silver medalist(s)	
2017	Grand Slam Baku	3rd place, bronze medalist(s)	
2017	Grand Prix Antalya	2nd place, silver medalist(s)	
2018	Grand Prix Hohhot	3rd place, bronze medalist(s)	
2019	Grand Prix Tel Aviv	1st place, gold medalist(s)	
2019	Grand Prix Hohhot	3rd place, bronze medalist(s)	
2019	Grand Prix Montreal	3rd place, bronze medalist(s)	
2019	Grand Slam Brasilia	3rd place, bronze medalist(s)	
2021	Grand Slam Antalya	3rd place, bronze medalist(s)	
2021	Grand Slam Baku	3rd place, bronze medalist(s)	
2022	European Championships	3rd place, bronze medalist(s)	
2023	Grand Prix Almada	3rd place, bronze medalist(s)	
2023	Grand Slam Antalya	2nd place, silver medalist(s)	

=== Israeli championships ===
Partial list:

(gold) 2009
(gold) 2012
(gold) 2016 (Note: Held in January 2017)
(gold) 2017
(gold) 2019
(silver) 2014
(silver) 2015
(bronze) 2007
(bronze) 2010 (Note: Held in March 2011)
(bronze) 2011

== See also ==
- List of Olympic medalists in judo
- List of 2020 Summer Olympics medal winners
- List of select Jewish judokas
