= Katharina Tanzer =

Austrian judoka (born 1995)

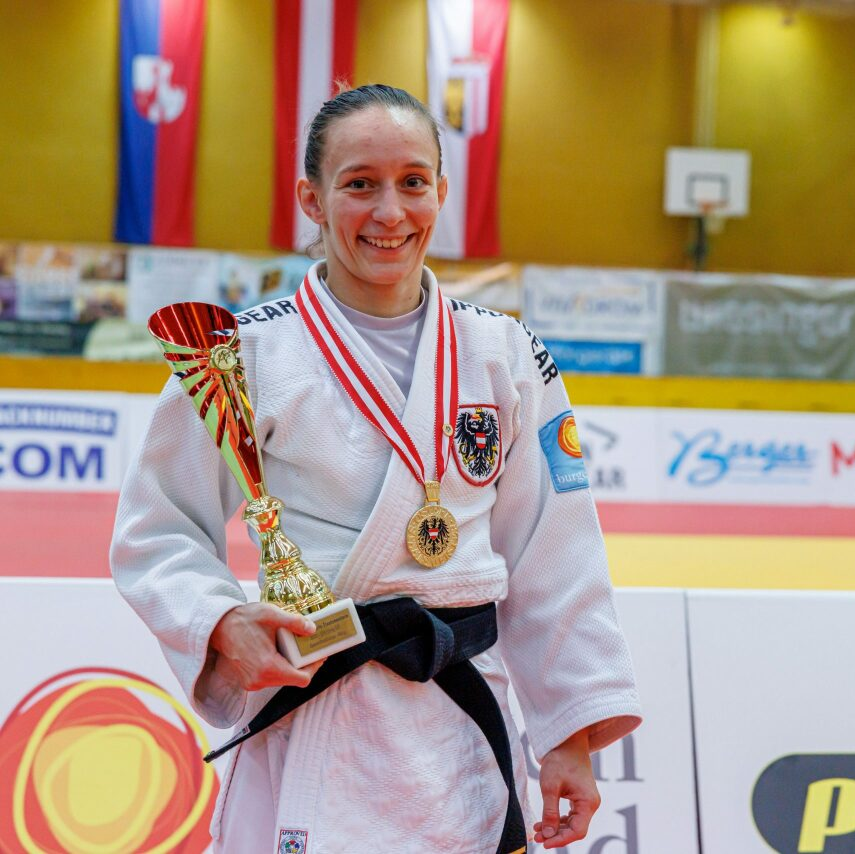
- Tanzer fights in the Austrian Championships 2023

Personal information
- Nickname: Kathi
- Born: 26 July 1995 (age 30) Scheibbs
- Occupation: Judoka
- Employer: Austrian Armed Forces
- Height: 1.54 m (5 ft 1 in)
- Military career
- Allegiance: Austria
- Branch: Austrian Armed Forces
- Service years: 2018–2025
- Rank: Gefreiter

Sport
- Country: Austria
- Sport: Judo
- Weight class: ‍–‍48 kg
- Rank: 2nd dan black belt
- League: Frauen Judo Bundesliga
- Club: SV Ulmerfeld (until 2013); Vienna Samurai (until 2021); Judo Leibnitz (since 2021)
- Team: TSV Großhadern (2018); JC Wimpassing (2021, 2022)
- Turned pro: 2018
- Coached by: Johann Reisinger (until 2013); Hupo Rohrauer (2013-2024)
- Retired: 2025

Achievements and titles
- Olympic Games: R16 (2024)
- World Champ.: R32 (2022, 2023, 2024)
- European Champ.: R16 (2019, 2022, 2023)
- Highest world ranking: 28th
Medal record
Women's judo
Representing Austria
European Games
Bronze medal – third place	2019 Minsk	Mixed team
IJF Grand Slam
Silver medal – second place	2021 Baku	‍–‍48 kg
Bronze medal – third place	2022 Tbilisi	‍–‍48 kg

Profile at external databases
- IJF: 22271
- JudoInside.com: 58391
- Updated on 27 July 2024

Katharina Tanzer (born 26 Juli 1995 in Scheibbs) is an Austrian judoka and Austrian state champion ‍–‍48 kg.

== Judo career ==
=== Education ===
Katharina Tanzer grew up in Gresten in the district of Scheibbs in Lower Austria. She began her judo career at SV Ulmerferld in Lower Austria. When she began her studies, she moved to the Viennese judo club Vienna Samurai. Thanks to more intensive training, she managed to medal four times in the Austrian championships in the U21 and U23 age groups by 2016. In 2016, Tanzer won the national championship and a European Cup medal for the first time. In June 2016, she suffered a ACL tear during a training camp in Japan.

In December 2017, Tanzer passed the exam for Shodan.

=== Qualification for the 2020 Olympic Games ===
Thanks to her successes at European Cups and the national championship, Tanzer has been an active athlete at the Army Sports Center of the Austrian Armed Forces since 2018. She holds the rank of Gefreiter. After a total of three operations and a two-year break from competition, she was able to return in autumn 2018 with two medals at the Continental Opens and one medal at the European Cup in Bratislava. At the 2019 European Games in Minsk, she won the bronze medal in the mixed team competition for Austria together with Sabrina Filzmoser, Bernadette Graf, Michaela Polleres, Lukas Reiter, Marko Bubanja and Stephan Hegyi. In the qualification period for the 2020 Olympic Games, Tanzer was able to secure two more medals at Continental Opens. She collected 583 points in the IJF Olympic Ranking and did not qualify for the Summer Games in Tokyo with 61st place in her weight class.

=== Olympic Games 2024 ===
In the qualification period for the 2024 Olympic Games, Tanzer was able to collect 1643 points in the IJF Olympic Ranking. She thus secured a European continental quota place. She took part in the 2024 Olympic Games both in the -48 kg weight class and in the mixed team (together with Lubjana Piovesana, Michaela Polleres, Samuel Gaßner, Wachid Borchashvili and Aaron Fara). In the individual competition, she had to admit defeat after a victory against Wong Ka Lee (HKG), the later silver medal winner, Bavuudorjiin Baasankhüü (MGL). The first encounter in the mixed team competition against Germany ended 4:1. The Austrian team therefore took 9th place.

For her participation in the Olympic Games, she was awarded the Nidan by Judo Austria.

In 2025, she began training to become a judo instructor. Since autumn 2025, she has been working as a trainer at JU Klosterneuburg.

== Club championships ==
When she changed clubs in 2015, Tanzer joined her team to take part in the Austrian women's team championships. As winners, the club qualified to take part in the 2015 Golden League in Vienna, where it was the first Austrian women's team to win a medal for Austria. The following year, they managed to secure another medal at the 2016 Golden League in Russia. In order to remain competitive in the next few years in the Frauen Judo Bundesliga, founded in 2016, Samurai Vienna formed Team Vienna together with WAT Stadlau. Tanzer contributed to the team's two silver medals in both 2017 and 2019. In 2018 Tanzer also played in the Deutschen 1. BL Frauen as a guest fighter for the club TSV München Großhadern In 2021, Tanzer moved to Judo Leibnitz. Since this club does not participate in the Frauen Judo Bundesliga, she player as a guest fighter for JC Wimpassing in the weight class -48 kg in 2021 and 2022. After winning in 2021, they were able to successfully defend their title in 2022.

== Achievements ==
Year	Tournament	Place	Weight class
2019	European Games	3rd	Mixed team

== Personal life ==
Her mother Barbara Tanzer is two-time vice national champion up to 52 kg.
