= Judo at the 2024 Summer Olympics – Women's 48 kg =

Judo Women's 48 kg at the Games of the XXXIII Olympiad
- Venue: Grand Palais Éphémère
- Location: Paris, France
- Date: 27 July 2024
- Competitors: 31 from 31 nations
- Website: Official website

Medalists
gold medal	Natsumi Tsunoda (1st title)	Japan
silver medal	Bavuudorjiin Baasankhüü	Mongolia
bronze medal	Shirine Boukli	France
bronze medal	Tara Babulfath	Sweden

Competition at external databases
- Links: IJF • JudoInside

The Women's 48 kg event in Judo at the 2024 Summer Olympics was held at the Grand Palais Éphémère in Paris, France on 27 July 2024.

== Summary ==
This is the ninth appearance of the women's extra lightweight category.

Distria Krasniqi upgraded from extra lightweight to half lightweight, Funa Tonaki did not qualify as she retired in January 2024, one of the bronze medalists, Daria Bilodid upgraded from extra lightweight to lightweight, and Mönkhbatyn Urantsetseg did not qualify as she retired in January 2022.

== Results ==
=== Finals ===
Semi-finals
Tara Babulfath (SWE)	00
Natsumi Tsunoda (JPN)	10
Bavuudorjiin Baasankhüü (MGL)	10
Laura Martínez (ESP)	00

Final
Natsumi Tsunoda (JPN)	01 (yellow card)
Bavuudorjiin Baasankhüü (MGL)	00

=== Repechage ===
Repechage
Assunta Scutto (ITA)	00 (yellow card)
Shirine Boukli (FRA)	01
Gabriela Narváez (PAR)	00 (yellow card)
Abiba Abuzhakynova (KAZ)	10

Bronze medal
Shirine Boukli (FRA)	01
Laura Martínez (ESP)	00
Abiba Abuzhakynova (KAZ)	00
Tara Babulfath (SWE)	10

=== Pool A ===
First round
Guo Zongying (CHN)	00
Maria Celia Laborde (USA)	10
Lee Hye-kyeong (KOR)	00
Tara Babulfath (SWE)	10
Leyla Aliyeva (AZE)	00 (yellow card)
Khalimajon Kurbonova (UZB)	01 (yellow card)

Round of 16
Assunta Scutto (ITA)	10 (yellow card)
Maria Celia Laborde (USA)	00
Tara Babulfath (SWE)	10 (yellow card)
Khalimajon Kurbonova (UZB)	00

Quarter-finals
Assunta Scutto (ITA)	00
Tara Babulfath (SWE)	10 (yellow card)

=== Pool B ===
First round
Natsumi Tsunoda (JPN)	11
Natasha Ferreira (BRA)	00
Jacqueline Solís (GUA)	01 (yellow card)
Geronay Whitebooi (RSA)	10
Shirine Boukli (FRA)	10 (yellow card)
Tuğçe Beder (TUR)	00
Hoàng Thị Tình (VIE)	00
Oumaima Bedioui (TUN)	01 (yellow card)

Round of 16
Natsumi Tsunoda (JPN)	11
Geronay Whitebooi (RSA)	00
Shirine Boukli (FRA)	10
Oumaima Bedioui (TUN)	00

Quarter-finals
Natsumi Tsunoda (JPN)	10
Shirine Boukli (FRA)	00

=== Pool C ===
First round
Bavuudorjiin Baasankhüü (MGL)	10
Katryna Esposito (MLT)	00 (yellow card)
Wong Ka Lee (HKG)	00
Katharina Tanzer (AUT)	10
Catarina Costa (POR)	01
Katharina Menz (GER)	00 (yellow card)
Gabriela Narváez (PAR)	11
Virginia Aymard (GAB)	00

Round of 16
Bavuudorjiin Baasankhüü (MGL)	10
Katharina Tanzer (AUT)	00
Catarina Costa (POR)	00 (yellow card)
Gabriela Narváez (PAR)	10

Quarter-finals
Bavuudorjiin Baasankhüü (MGL)	10 (yellow card)
Gabriela Narváez (PAR)	00

=== Pool D ===
First round
Abiba Abuzhakynova (KAZ)	01
Shira Rishony (ISR)	00 (yellow card)
Lin Chen-hao (TPE)	10
Erika Lasso (COL)	00
Milica Nikolić (SRB)	01
Maruša Štangar (SLO)	00
Laura Martínez (ESP)	01
Mary Dee Vargas (CHI)	00

Round of 16
Abiba Abuzhakynova (KAZ)	10
Lin Chen-hao (TPE)	00
Milica Nikolić (SRB)	00
Laura Martínez (ESP)	10 (yellow card)

Quarter-finals
Abiba Abuzhakynova (KAZ)	00
Laura Martínez (ESP)	10
