= Leyla Aliyeva (judoka) =

Azerbaijani judoka (born 1997)

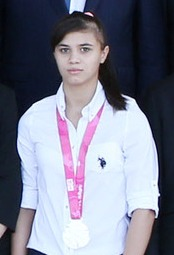
- Aliyeva in 2014

Personal information
- Native name: Leyla Əliyeva
- Born: 1 September 1997 (age 29)
- Occupation: Judoka

Sport
- Country: Azerbaijan
- Sport: Judo
- Weight class: ‍–‍48 kg

Achievements and titles
- Olympic Games: R32 (2024)
- World Champ.: R32 (2021, 2022, 2023, 2024, 2025)
- European Champ.: 7th (2023)
Medal record
Women's judo
Representing Azerbaijan
IJF Grand Slam
Silver medal – second place	2023 Baku	‍–‍48 kg
Bronze medal – third place	2023 Abu Dhabi	‍–‍48 kg
IJF Grand Prix
Silver medal – second place	2019 Tashkent	‍–‍48 kg
World Cadets Championships
Silver medal – second place	2013 Miami	‍–‍40 kg
European Cadet Championships
Gold medal – first place	2013 Tallinn	‍–‍40 kg
Silver medal – second place	2014 Athens	‍–‍44 kg
Summer Universiade
Bronze medal – third place	2021 Chengdu	‍–‍48 kg
Islamic Solidarity Games
Bronze medal – third place	2021 Konya	Women's team
Youth Olympic Games
Silver medal – second place	2014 Nanjing	‍–‍44 kg

Profile at external databases
- IJF: 13022
- JudoInside.com: 85470
- Updated on 23 December 2024

Leyla Aliyeva (Azerbaijani: Leyla Əliyeva; born 1 September 1997) is an Azerbaijani judoka and a member of the national judo team of Azerbaijan. She is a silver medalist from the 2014 Youth Olympic Games and a bronze medalist from the 2021 Summer Universiade. Aliyeva is a two-time champion of Azerbaijan (2017, 2024). She participated in the 2015 European Games and the 2017 World Judo Championships.

== Biography ==
Leyla Aliyeva was born on 1 September 1997. In 2012, she won the Azerbaijani U17 Judo Championship.

Aliyeva won gold at the 2013 European Cadet Championships in Tallinn, competing in the 40 kg weight category. That same year, she secured a silver medal at the World Cadets Championships in Miami.

Aliyeva won a silver medal at the 2014 European Junior Championships in Athens in the 44 kg weight category. Later that year, she competed at the 2014 Summer Youth Olympic Games in Nanjing. In the 44 kg weight category, she reached the final but lost to Melisa Çakmaklı, winning a silver medal.

Aliyeva joined the Azerbaijani national team in 2015 and represented Azerbaijan at the 2015 European Games in Baku. Competing in the 48 kg category, she defeated Kristina Vrsić of Slovenia in the round of 32, but was eliminated in the round of 16 by Charline Van Snick of Belgium.

In June 2017, Aliyeva became the Azerbaijani U23 Champion. She also competed at the 2017 World Championships in Budapest in the 48 kg category but was eliminated in her opening match by eventual world champion Funa Tonaki of Japan.

In December 2017, Aliyeva claimed the Azerbaijani senior judo title in the 48 kg category. Seven years later, in December 2024, she won another gold medal at the 2024 Azerbaijani Judo Championship.
