= Bavuudorjiin Baasankhüü =

Mongolian judoka (born 1999)

Personal information
- Native name: Бавуудоржийн Баасанхүү
- Born: 26 November 1999 (age 26) Mörön, Khövsgöl, Mongolia
- Occupation: Judoka

Sport
- Country: Mongolia
- Sport: Judo
- Weight class: ‍–‍48 kg

Achievements and titles
- Olympic Games: (silver) (2024)
- World Champ.: (gold) (2024)
- Asian Champ.: (gold) (2024)
- Highest world ranking: 1^{st}
Medal record
Women's judo
Representing Mongolia
Olympic Games
Silver medal – second place	2024 Paris	‍–‍48 kg
World Championships
Gold medal – first place	2024 Abu Dhabi	‍–‍48 kg
Asian Championships
Gold medal – first place	2024 Hong Kong	‍–‍48 kg
World Masters
Bronze medal – third place	2023 Budapest	‍–‍48 kg
IJF Grand Slam
Gold medal – first place	2024 Dushanbe	‍–‍48 kg
Silver medal – second place	2022 Paris	‍–‍48 kg
Silver medal – second place	2022 Antalya	‍–‍48 kg
Bronze medal – third place	2022 Tel Aviv	‍–‍48 kg
Bronze medal – third place	2022 Budapest	‍–‍48 kg
Bronze medal – third place	2023 Antalya	‍–‍48 kg
Bronze medal – third place	2026 Budapest	‍–‍48 kg

Profile at external databases
- IJF: 65319
- JudoInside.com: 97811
- Updated on 13 September 2026

Bavuudorjiin Baasankhüü (Mongolian: Бавуудоржийн Баасанхүү; born 26 November 1999) is a Mongolian judoka who competes in the women's 48 kg division. She won silver medal at the 2024 Summer Olympics and the gold medal at the 2024 World Judo Championships held in Abu Dhabi, United Arab Emirates. She is also a gold medalist at the 2024 Asian Championships.

== Career ==
Baasankhüü's first major international success was the 2022 Paris Grand Slam where she won the silver medal, having lost to the Japanese Natsumi Tsunoda. She had reached the round of 16 stage at the 2022 and 2023 World Championships. At the 2022 Asian Games held in September 2023, Baasankhüü finished in seventh place.

Baasankhüü defeated South Korean Lee Hye-kyeong to win the gold medal at the 2024 Asian Championships and was victorious at the 2024 Dushanbe Grand Slam. At the 2024 World Championships in May, she reached the final, which she won against the Italian Assunta Scutto with a waza-ari by immobilization following a failed attack by Scutto at the very end of the fight. She won the silver medal in the -48 kg event at the 2024 Summer Olympics in Paris, having again lost to Tsunoda.
