= Wakana Koga =

Japanese judoka (born 2001)

Personal information
- Born: 28 June 2001 (age 25)
- Occupation: Judoka

Sport
- Country: Japan
- Sport: Judo
- Weight class: ‍–‍48 kg

Achievements and titles
- World Champ.: (gold) (2026)
- Asian Champ.: (gold) (2022)
Medal record
Women's judo
Representing Japan
World Championships
Gold medal – first place	2026 Baku	‍–‍48 kg
Silver medal – second place	2021 Budapest	‍–‍48 kg
Bronze medal – third place	2023 Doha	‍–‍48 kg
Bronze medal – third place	2025 Budapest	‍–‍48 kg
Asian Championships
Gold medal – first place	2022 Nur‑Sultan	‍–‍48 kg
World Masters
Gold medal – first place	2023 Budapest	‍–‍48 kg
Silver medal – second place	2022 Jerusalem	‍–‍48 kg
IJF Grand Slam
Gold medal – first place	2021 Paris	‍–‍48 kg
Gold medal – first place	2024 Tokyo	‍–‍48 kg
Gold medal – first place	2025 Tokyo	‍–‍48 kg
Gold medal – first place	2026 Ulaanbaatar	‍–‍48 kg
Silver medal – second place	2020 Paris	‍–‍48 kg
Silver medal – second place	2024 Paris	‍–‍48 kg
Bronze medal – third place	2019 Osaka	‍–‍48 kg
Bronze medal – third place	2022 Paris	‍–‍48 kg
Bronze medal – third place	2022 Tokyo	‍–‍48 kg
Bronze medal – third place	2025 Paris	‍–‍48 kg
Bronze medal – third place	2026 Paris	‍–‍48 kg
IJF Grand Prix
Gold medal – first place	2019 Montreal	‍–‍48 kg
Gold medal – first place	2022 Zagreb	‍–‍48 kg
Gold medal – first place	2024 Zagreb	‍–‍48 kg
World Juniors Championships
Gold medal – first place	2019 Marrakesh	‍–‍48 kg

Profile at external databases
- IJF: 31757
- JudoInside.com: 105986
- Updated on 4 October 2026

Wakana Koga (born 28 June 2001) is a Japanese judoka. She won the women's 48 kg event at the 2026 World Judo Championships held in Baku, Azerbaijan. In the final, she defeated previous champion Assunta Scutto. She also is a runner-up at the 2021 Championships, as well as two bronze medals at the 2023 and 2025 editions.

Koga won one of the bronze medals in her event at the 2022 Judo Grand Slam Paris held in Paris, France.
