= 2026 Judo Grand Prix Zagreb =

Judo Competition

Judo 2026 Judo Grand Prix Zagreb
- Venue: Arena Zagreb
- Location: Zagreb, Croatia
- Dates: 13–15 November 2026
- Competitors: 539 from 68 nations
- Total prize money: €98,000

Competition at external databases
- Links: IJF • JudoInside

The 2026 Judo Grand Prix Zagreb was held at the Arena Zagreb in Zagreb, Croatia from 13 to 15 November 2026 as part of the IJF World Tour and during the 2028 Summer Olympics qualification period.

== Medal summary ==
=== Men's events ===
Event	Gold	Silver	Bronze
Extra-lightweight (−60 kg)	Yang Yung-wei (TPE)	Aman Bakytzhan (KAZ)	Luka Mkheidze (FRA)
Extra-lightweight (−60 kg)	Yang Yung-wei (TPE)	Aman Bakytzhan (KAZ)	David Štarkel (SLO)
Half-lightweight (−66 kg)	Nurkanat Serikbayev (KAZ)	Ronald Lima (BRA)	Lin Chong-you (TPE)
Half-lightweight (−66 kg)	Nurkanat Serikbayev (KAZ)	Ronald Lima (BRA)	Miguel Nery Gago (POR)
Lightweight (−73 kg)	Giorgi Loladze (GEO)	Joshua Green (IRL)	Maxime Gobert (FRA)
Lightweight (−73 kg)	Giorgi Loladze (GEO)	Joshua Green (IRL)	Akil Gjakova (KOS)
Half-middleweight (−81 kg)	François Gauthier-Drapeau (CAN)	Murodjon Yuldoshev (UZB)	Mykhailo Svidrak (UKR)
Half-middleweight (−81 kg)	François Gauthier-Drapeau (CAN)	Murodjon Yuldoshev (UZB)	Olivier Gagnon (CAN)
Middleweight (−90 kg)	Guilherme Schimidt (BRA)	Theodoros Tselidis (GRE)	Keagan Young (CAN)
Middleweight (−90 kg)	Guilherme Schimidt (BRA)	Theodoros Tselidis (GRE)	Kenny Komi Bedel (ITA)
Half-heavyweight (−100 kg)	Anton Savytskiy (UKR)	Zsombor Vég (HUN)	Nikoloz Sherazadishvili (ESP)
Half-heavyweight (−100 kg)	Anton Savytskiy (UKR)	Zsombor Vég (HUN)	Daniel Eich (SUI)
Heavyweight (+100 kg)	Kanan Nasibov (AZE)	Losseni Kone (GER)	Saba Inaneishvili (GEO)
Heavyweight (+100 kg)	Kanan Nasibov (AZE)	Losseni Kone (GER)	Yevheniy Balyevskyy (UKR)

=== Women's events ===
Event	Gold	Silver	Bronze
Extra-lightweight (−48 kg)	Assunta Scutto (ITA)	Galiya Tynbayeva (KAZ)	Jacqueline Springer (AUT)
Extra-lightweight (−48 kg)	Assunta Scutto (ITA)	Galiya Tynbayeva (KAZ)	Amber Gersjes (NED)
Half-lightweight (−52 kg)	Róza Gyertyás (HUN)	Naomi van Krevel (NED)	Gultaj Mammadaliyeva (AZE)
Half-lightweight (−52 kg)	Róza Gyertyás (HUN)	Naomi van Krevel (NED)	Diyora Keldiyorova (UZB)
Lightweight (−57 kg)	Shirlen Nascimento (BRA)	Inbal Shemesh (ISR)	Marta García (ESP)
Lightweight (−57 kg)	Shirlen Nascimento (BRA)	Inbal Shemesh (ISR)	Adriana Rodríguez Salvador (ESP)
Half-middleweight (−63 kg)	Jessica Klimkait (CAN)	Kaja Kajzer Zabkar (SLO)	Iva Oberan (CRO)
Half-middleweight (−63 kg)	Jessica Klimkait (CAN)	Kaja Kajzer Zabkar (SLO)	Joanne van Lieshout (NED)
Middleweight (−70 kg)	Nauana Silva (BRA)	Aleksandra Kowalewska (POL)	April Lynn Fohouo (SUI)
Middleweight (−70 kg)	Nauana Silva (BRA)	Aleksandra Kowalewska (POL)	Maya Goshen (ISR)
Half-heavyweight (−78 kg)	Julie Hölterhoff (GER)	Elena Dengg (AUT)	Elvismar Rodríguez (VEN)
Half-heavyweight (−78 kg)	Julie Hölterhoff (GER)	Elena Dengg (AUT)	Emma Reid (GBR)
Heavyweight (+78 kg)	Beatriz Souza (BRA)	Sydnee Andrews (NZL)	Rochele Nunes (POR)
Heavyweight (+78 kg)	Beatriz Souza (BRA)	Sydnee Andrews (NZL)	Léa Fontaine (FRA)

=== Medal table ===
* Host nation (Croatia)

Rank	Nation	Gold	Silver	Bronze	Total
1	Brazil (BRA)	4	1	0	5
2	Canada (CAN)	2	0	2	4
3	Kazakhstan (KAZ)	1	2	0	3
4	Germany (GER)	1	1	0	2
4	Hungary (HUN)	1	1	0	2
6	Ukraine (UKR)	1	0	2	3
7	Azerbaijan (AZE)	1	0	1	2
7	Chinese Taipei (TPE)	1	0	1	2
7	Georgia (GEO)	1	0	1	2
7	Italy (ITA)	1	0	1	2
11	Netherlands (NED)	0	1	2	3
12	Austria (AUT)	0	1	1	2
12	Israel (ISR)	0	1	1	2
12	Slovenia (SLO)	0	1	1	2
12	Uzbekistan (UZB)	0	1	1	2
16	Greece (GRE)	0	1	0	1
16	Ireland (IRL)	0	1	0	1
16	New Zealand (NZL)	0	1	0	1
16	Poland (POL)	0	1	0	1
20	France (FRA)	0	0	3	3
20	Spain (ESP)	0	0	3	3
22	Portugal (POR)	0	0	2	2
22	Switzerland (SUI)	0	0	2	2
24	Croatia (CRO)*	0	0	1	1
24	Great Britain (GBR)	0	0	1	1
24	Kosovo (KOS)	0	0	1	1
24	Venezuela (VEN)	0	0	1	1
Totals (27 entries)		14	14	28	56

== Prize money ==
The sums written are per medalist, bringing the total prizes awarded to €154,000. (retrieved from:)

Medal	Total	Judoka	Coach
Gold	€5,000	€4,000	€1,000
Silver	€3,000	€2,400	€600
Bronze	€1,500	€1,200	€300
