= 2019 Judo Grand Prix Montreal =

Judo competition

Judo 2019 Judo Grand Prix Montreal
- Venue: Maurice Richard Arena
- Location: Montreal, Canada
- Dates: 5–7 July 2019
- Competitors: 248 from 49 nations

Competition at external databases
- Links: IJF • EJU • JudoInside

The 2019 Judo Grand Prix Montreal was held in Montreal, Canada, from 5 to 7 July 2019.

== Medal summary ==
=== Men's events ===
Event	Gold	Silver	Bronze
Extra-lightweight (−60 kg)	Naohisa Takato (JPN)	Robert Mshvidobadze (RUS)	Lee Ha-rim (KOR)
Extra-lightweight (−60 kg)	Naohisa Takato (JPN)	Robert Mshvidobadze (RUS)	Adonis Diaz (USA)
Half-lightweight (−66 kg)	Ganboldyn Kherlen (MGL)	Kenneth Van Gansbeke (BEL)	Nathon Burns (IRL)
Half-lightweight (−66 kg)	Ganboldyn Kherlen (MGL)	Kenneth Van Gansbeke (BEL)	Jacob Valois (CAN)
Lightweight (−73 kg)	Soichi Hashimoto (JPN)	Victor Scvortov (UAE)	Antoine Bouchard (CAN)
Lightweight (−73 kg)	Soichi Hashimoto (JPN)	Victor Scvortov (UAE)	Anthony Zingg (GER)
Half-middleweight (−81 kg)	Takanori Nagase (JPN)	Antoine Valois-Fortier (CAN)	Matthias Casse (BEL)
Half-middleweight (−81 kg)	Takanori Nagase (JPN)	Antoine Valois-Fortier (CAN)	Aslan Lappinagov (RUS)
Middleweight (−90 kg)	Mashu Baker (JPN)	Colton Brown (USA)	Rafael Macedo (BRA)
Middleweight (−90 kg)	Mashu Baker (JPN)	Colton Brown (USA)	Milan Randl (SVK)
Half-heavyweight (−100 kg)	Ramadan Darwish (EGY)	Shady El Nahas (CAN)	Leonardo Gonçalves (BRA)
Half-heavyweight (−100 kg)	Ramadan Darwish (EGY)	Shady El Nahas (CAN)	Kyle Reyes (CAN)
Heavyweight (+100 kg)	Teddy Riner (FRA)	Hisayoshi Harasawa (JPN)	Lukáš Krpálek (CZE)
Heavyweight (+100 kg)	Teddy Riner (FRA)	Hisayoshi Harasawa (JPN)	David Moura (BRA)

=== Women's events ===
Event	Gold	Silver	Bronze
Extra-lightweight (−48 kg)	Wakana Koga (JPN)	Catarina Costa (POR)	Paula Pareto (ARG)
Extra-lightweight (−48 kg)	Wakana Koga (JPN)	Catarina Costa (POR)	Shira Rishony (ISR)
Half-lightweight (−52 kg)	Gefen Primo (ISR)	Angelica Delgado (USA)	Sarah Menezes (BRA)
Half-lightweight (−52 kg)	Gefen Primo (ISR)	Angelica Delgado (USA)	Jeong Bo-kyeong (KOR)
Lightweight (−57 kg)	Christa Deguchi (CAN)	Jessica Klimkait (CAN)	Timna Nelson-Levy (ISR)
Lightweight (−57 kg)	Christa Deguchi (CAN)	Jessica Klimkait (CAN)	Julia Kowalczyk (POL)
Half-middleweight (−63 kg)	Cho Mok-hee (KOR)	Amy Livesey (GBR)	Catherine Beauchemin-Pinard (CAN)
Half-middleweight (−63 kg)	Cho Mok-hee (KOR)	Amy Livesey (GBR)	Alexia Castilhos (BRA)
Middleweight (−70 kg)	Giovanna Scoccimarro (GER)	Kelita Zupancic (CAN)	Kim Seong-yeon (KOR)
Middleweight (−70 kg)	Giovanna Scoccimarro (GER)	Kelita Zupancic (CAN)	Megan Fletcher (IRL)
Half-heavyweight (−78 kg)	Shori Hamada (JPN)	Aleksandra Babintseva (RUS)	Vanessa Chalá (ECU)
Half-heavyweight (−78 kg)	Shori Hamada (JPN)	Aleksandra Babintseva (RUS)	Maike Ziech (GER)
Heavyweight (+78 kg)	Sarah Asahina (JPN)	Raz Hershko (ISR)	Melissa Mojica (PUR)
Heavyweight (+78 kg)	Sarah Asahina (JPN)	Raz Hershko (ISR)	Nami Inamori (JPN)

Source Results

=== Medal table ===
* Host nation (Canada)

Rank	Nation	Gold	Silver	Bronze	Total
1	Japan (JPN)	8	1	1	10
2	Canada (CAN)*	1	4	4	9
3	Israel (ISR)	1	1	2	4
4	Germany (GER)	1	0	2	3
5	Egypt (EGY)	1	0	0	1
5	France (FRA)	1	0	0	1
5	Mongolia (MGL)	1	0	0	1
8	Russia (RUS)	0	2	1	3
8	United States (USA)	0	2	1	3
10	Belgium (BEL)	0	1	1	2
11	Great Britain (GBR)	0	1	0	1
11	Portugal (POR)	0	1	0	1
11	United Arab Emirates (UAE)	0	1	0	1
14	Brazil (BRA)	0	0	5	5
15	South Korea (KOR)	0	0	3	3
16	Ireland (IRL)	0	0	2	2
17	Argentina (ARG)	0	0	1	1
17	Czech Republic (CZE)	0	0	1	1
17	Ecuador (ECU)	0	0	1	1
17	Poland (POL)	0	0	1	1
17	Puerto Rico (PUR)	0	0	1	1
17	Slovakia (SVK)	0	0	1	1
Totals (22 entries)		14	14	28	56
