= 2023 Judo Grand Prix Almada =

Judo competition

Judo 2023 Judo Grand Prix Almada
- Venue: Complexo Municipal dos Desportos da Cidade de Almada
- Location: Almada, Portugal
- Dates: 27–29 January 2023
- Competitors: 544 from 81 nations
- Total prize money: €98,000

Competition at external databases
- Links: IJF • EJU • JudoInside

The 2023 Judo Grand Prix Almada was held at the Complexo Municipal dos Desportos da Cidade de Almada in Almada, Portugal, from 27 to 29 January 2023 as part of the IJF World Tour and during the 2024 Summer Olympics qualification period.

== Medal summary ==
=== Men's events ===
Event	Gold	Silver	Bronze
Extra-lightweight (−60 kg)	Yamato Fukuda (JPN)	Francisco Garrigós (ESP)	Cédric Revol (FRA)
Extra-lightweight (−60 kg)	Yamato Fukuda (JPN)	Francisco Garrigós (ESP)	Luka Mkheidze (FRA)
Half-lightweight (−66 kg)	Mukhriddin Tilovov (UZB)	An Ba-ul (KOR)	Daikii Bouba (FRA)
Half-lightweight (−66 kg)	Mukhriddin Tilovov (UZB)	An Ba-ul (KOR)	Radu Izvoreanu (MDA)
Lightweight (−73 kg)	Obidkhon Nomonov (UZB)	Zhansay Smagulov (KAZ)	Jose Antonio Aranda (ESP)
Lightweight (−73 kg)	Obidkhon Nomonov (UZB)	Zhansay Smagulov (KAZ)	Kang Heon-cheol (KOR)
Half-middleweight (−81 kg)	Lee Joon-hwan (KOR)	Eljan Hajiyev (AZE)	Mihail Latișev (MDA)
Half-middleweight (−81 kg)	Lee Joon-hwan (KOR)	Eljan Hajiyev (AZE)	Frank de Wit (NED)
Middleweight (−90 kg)	Ivaylo Ivanov (BUL)	Krisztián Tóth (HUN)	Roland Gőz (HUN)
Middleweight (−90 kg)	Ivaylo Ivanov (BUL)	Krisztián Tóth (HUN)	Axel Clerget (FRA)
Half-heavyweight (−100 kg)	Ilia Sulamanidze (GEO)	Dota Arai (JPN)	Lukáš Krpálek (CZE)
Half-heavyweight (−100 kg)	Ilia Sulamanidze (GEO)	Dota Arai (JPN)	Zsombor Vég (HUN)
Heavyweight (+100 kg)	Kim Min-jong (KOR)	Saba Inaneishvili (GEO)	Rafael Silva (BRA)
Heavyweight (+100 kg)	Kim Min-jong (KOR)	Saba Inaneishvili (GEO)	Odkhüügiin Tsetsentsengel (MGL)

=== Women's events ===
Event	Gold	Silver	Bronze
Extra-lightweight (−48 kg)	Abiba Abuzhakynova (KAZ)	Galiya Tynbayeva (KAZ)	Shira Rishony (ISR)
Extra-lightweight (−48 kg)	Abiba Abuzhakynova (KAZ)	Galiya Tynbayeva (KAZ)	Mireia Lapuerta Comas (ESP)
Half-lightweight (−52 kg)	Chelsie Giles (GBR)	Estrella López Sheriff (ESP)	Naomi van Krevel (NED)
Half-lightweight (−52 kg)	Chelsie Giles (GBR)	Estrella López Sheriff (ESP)	Julie Weill dit Morey (FRA)
Lightweight (−57 kg)	Huh Mi-mi (KOR)	Rafaela Silva (BRA)	Nekoda Smythe-Davis (GBR)
Lightweight (−57 kg)	Huh Mi-mi (KOR)	Rafaela Silva (BRA)	Thauany Capanni Dias (ITA)
Half-middleweight (−63 kg)	Bárbara Timo (POR)	Gabriella Moraes (BRA)	Cristina Cabaña (ESP)
Half-middleweight (−63 kg)	Bárbara Timo (POR)	Gabriella Moraes (BRA)	Iva Oberan (CRO)
Middleweight (−70 kg)	Aoife Coughlan (AUS)	Elvismar Rodríguez (VEN)	Ida Eriksson (SWE)
Middleweight (−70 kg)	Aoife Coughlan (AUS)	Elvismar Rodríguez (VEN)	Szabina Gercsák (HUN)
Half-heavyweight (−78 kg)	Patrícia Sampaio (POR)	Yelyzaveta Lytvynenko (UKR)	Loriana Kuka (KOS)
Half-heavyweight (−78 kg)	Patrícia Sampaio (POR)	Yelyzaveta Lytvynenko (UKR)	Emma Reid (GBR)
Heavyweight (+78 kg)	Kim Ha-yun (KOR)	Rochele Nunes (POR)	Milica Žabić (SRB)
Heavyweight (+78 kg)	Kim Ha-yun (KOR)	Rochele Nunes (POR)	Karen Stevenson (NED)

Source results:

=== Medal table ===
* Host nation (Portugal)

Rank	Nation	Gold	Silver	Bronze	Total
1	South Korea (KOR)	4	1	1	6
2	Portugal (POR)*	2	1	0	3
3	Uzbekistan (UZB)	2	0	0	2
4	Kazakhstan (KAZ)	1	2	0	3
5	Georgia (GEO)	1	1	0	2
5	Japan (JPN)	1	1	0	2
7	Great Britain (GBR)	1	0	2	3
8	Australia (AUS)	1	0	0	1
8	Bulgaria (BUL)	1	0	0	1
10	Spain (ESP)	0	2	3	5
11	Brazil (BRA)	0	2	1	3
12	Hungary (HUN)	0	1	3	4
13	Azerbaijan (AZE)	0	1	0	1
13	Ukraine (UKR)	0	1	0	1
13	Venezuela (VEN)	0	1	0	1
16	France (FRA)	0	0	5	5
17	Netherlands (NED)	0	0	3	3
18	Moldova (MDA)	0	0	2	2
19	Croatia (CRO)	0	0	1	1
19	Czech Republic (CZE)	0	0	1	1
19	Israel (ISR)	0	0	1	1
19	Italy (ITA)	0	0	1	1
19	Kosovo (KOS)	0	0	1	1
19	Mongolia (MGL)	0	0	1	1
19	Serbia (SRB)	0	0	1	1
19	Sweden (SWE)	0	0	1	1
Totals (26 entries)		14	14	28	56

== Prize money ==
The sums written are per medalist, bringing the total prizes awarded to €98,000. (retrieved from:)

Medal	Total	Judoka	Coach
Gold	€3,000	€2,400	€600
Silver	€2,000	€1,600	€400
Bronze	€1,000	€800	€200
