= 2022 Judo Grand Slam Ulaanbaatar =

Judo competition in Ulaanbaatar, Mongolia

Judo 2022 Judo Grand Slam Ulaanbaatar
- Venue: AIC Steppe Arena
- Location: Ulaanbaatar, Mongolia
- Dates: 24–26 June 2022
- Competitors: 255 from 30 nations
- Total prize money: €154,000

Competition at external databases
- Links: IJF • JudoInside

The 2022 Judo Grand Slam Ulaanbaatar was held at AIC Steppe Arena in Ulaanbaatar, Mongolia, from 24 to 26 June 2022 as part of the IJF World Tour and during the 2024 Summer Olympics qualification period. After the 2022 Russian invasion of Ukraine, all of the other 31 Summer Olympic sports organizations other than the IJF have suspended Russian and Belarusian athletes from their competitions. But IJF President Marius Vizer, a long-time close friend of Russian President Vladimir Putin, wanted instead to let Russians and Belarusians continue to compete as neutral athletes. Ukraine boycotted the event because the Russian team was allowed to compete; Russia entered 24 competitors in the competition. Allowing Russians to compete went against the recommendation of the International Olympic Committee.

== Event videos ==
The event aired on the IJF YouTube channel.

	Weight classes	Preliminaries			Final Block
Day 1	Men: −60, −66 Women: −48, −52, −57	Commentated			Commentated
Day 1	Men: −60, −66 Women: −48, −52, −57	Tatami 1	Tatami 2	Tatami 3	Commentated
Day 2	Men: −73, −81 Women: −63, −70	Commentated			Commentated
Day 2	Men: −73, −81 Women: −63, −70	Tatami 1	Tatami 2	Tatami 3	Commentated
Day 3	Men: −90, −100, +100 Women: −78, +78	Commentated			Commentated
Day 3	Men: −90, −100, +100 Women: −78, +78	Tatami 1	Tatami 2	Tatami 3	Commentated

== Medal summary ==
=== Men's events ===
Event	Gold	Silver	Bronze
Extra-lightweight (−60 kg)	Ryuju Nagayama (JPN)	Yang Yung-wei (TPE)	Lee Ha-rim (KOR)
Extra-lightweight (−60 kg)	Ryuju Nagayama (JPN)	Yang Yung-wei (TPE)	Enkhtaivany Sumiyabazar (MGL)
Half-lightweight (−66 kg)	Battogtokhyn Erkhembayar (MGL)	Günjinlkhamyn Sod-Erdene (MGL)	Yago Abuladze (IJF)
Half-lightweight (−66 kg)	Battogtokhyn Erkhembayar (MGL)	Günjinlkhamyn Sod-Erdene (MGL)	Yondonperenlein Baskhüü (MGL)
Lightweight (−73 kg)	Makhmadbek Makhmadbekov (IJF)	Tsend-Ochiryn Tsogtbaatar (MGL)	Obidkhon Nomonov (UZB)
Lightweight (−73 kg)	Makhmadbek Makhmadbekov (IJF)	Tsend-Ochiryn Tsogtbaatar (MGL)	Tohar Butbul (ISR)
Half-middleweight (−81 kg)	Lee Joon-hwan (KOR)	Shamil Borchashvili (AUT)	Frank de Wit (NED)
Half-middleweight (−81 kg)	Lee Joon-hwan (KOR)	Shamil Borchashvili (AUT)	Takanori Nagase (JPN)
Middleweight (−90 kg)	Mikhail Igolnikov (IJF)	Davlat Bobonov (UZB)	Didar Khamza (KAZ)
Middleweight (−90 kg)	Mikhail Igolnikov (IJF)	Davlat Bobonov (UZB)	Noël van 't End (NED)
Half-heavyweight (−100 kg)	Matvey Kanikovskiy (IJF)	Jorge Fonseca (POR)	Peter Paltchik (ISR)
Half-heavyweight (−100 kg)	Matvey Kanikovskiy (IJF)	Jorge Fonseca (POR)	Michael Korrel (NED)
Heavyweight (+100 kg)	Inal Tasoev (IJF)	Roy Meyer (NED)	Adil Orazbayev (KAZ)
Heavyweight (+100 kg)	Inal Tasoev (IJF)	Roy Meyer (NED)	Yusei Ogawa (JPN)

=== Women's events ===
Event	Gold	Silver	Bronze
Extra-lightweight (−48 kg)	Natsumi Tsunoda (JPN)	Ganbaataryn Narantsetseg (MGL)	Lee Hye-kyeong (KOR)
Extra-lightweight (−48 kg)	Natsumi Tsunoda (JPN)	Ganbaataryn Narantsetseg (MGL)	Abiba Abuzhakynova (KAZ)
Half-lightweight (−52 kg)	Diyora Keldiyorova (UZB)	Alesya Kuznetsova (IJF)	Jung Ye-rin (KOR)
Half-lightweight (−52 kg)	Diyora Keldiyorova (UZB)	Alesya Kuznetsova (IJF)	Bishreltiin Khorloodoi (MGL)
Lightweight (−57 kg)	Lkhagvatogoogiin Enkhriilen (MGL)	Daria Kurbonmamadova (IJF)	Mönkhtsedeviin Ichinkhorloo (MGL)
Lightweight (−57 kg)	Lkhagvatogoogiin Enkhriilen (MGL)	Daria Kurbonmamadova (IJF)	Timna Nelson-Levy (ISR)
Half-middleweight (−63 kg)	Nami Nabekura (JPN)	Gili Sharir (ISR)	Brigitta Varga (HUN)
Half-middleweight (−63 kg)	Nami Nabekura (JPN)	Gili Sharir (ISR)	Kamila Badurova (IJF)
Middleweight (−70 kg)	Madina Taimazova (IJF)	Yoko Ono (JPN)	Miriam Butkereit (GER)
Middleweight (−70 kg)	Madina Taimazova (IJF)	Yoko Ono (JPN)	Gulnoza Matniyazova (UZB)
Half-heavyweight (−78 kg)	Mami Umeki (JPN)	Inbar Lanir (ISR)	Alina Böhm (GER)
Half-heavyweight (−78 kg)	Mami Umeki (JPN)	Inbar Lanir (ISR)	Otgonbayaryn Khüslen (MGL)
Heavyweight (+78 kg)	Raz Hershko (ISR)	Amarsaikhany Adiyaasüren (MGL)	Kim Ha-yun (KOR)
Heavyweight (+78 kg)	Raz Hershko (ISR)	Amarsaikhany Adiyaasüren (MGL)	Kamila Berlikash (KAZ)

=== Medal table ===
* Host nation (Mongolia)

Rank	Nation	Gold	Silver	Bronze	Total
1	International Judo Federation	5	2	2	9
2	Japan	4	1	2	7
3	Mongolia*	2	4	5	11
4	Israel	1	2	3	6
5	Uzbekistan	1	1	2	4
6	South Korea	1	0	4	5
7	Netherlands	0	1	3	4
8	Austria	0	1	0	1
8	Chinese Taipei	0	1	0	1
8	Portugal	0	1	0	1
11	Kazakhstan	0	0	4	4
12	Germany	0	0	2	2
13	Hungary	0	0	1	1
Totals (13 entries)		14	14	28	56

== Prize money ==
The sums written are per medalist, bringing the total prizes awarded to €154,000. (retrieved from:)

Medal	Total	Judoka	Coach
Gold	€5,000	€4,000	€1,000
Silver	€3,000	€2,400	€600
Bronze	€1,500	€1,200	€300
