= Judo at the 2014 Summer Youth Olympics – Girls' 44 kg =

Judo competition

Girls' 44 kg at the II Summer Youth Olympic Games
- Venue: Longjiang Gymnasium
- Date: August 17
- Competitors: 7 from 7 nations

Medalists
| 1st place, gold medalist(s) | | Melisa Çakmaklı | Turkey |
| 2nd place, silver medalist(s) | | Leyla Aliyeva | Azerbaijan |
| 3rd place, bronze medalist(s) | | Anastasya Turcheva | Russia |
| 3rd place, bronze medalist(s) | | Honoka Yamauchi | Japan |

The Girls' 44 kg tournament in Judo at the 2014 Summer Youth Olympics was held on August 17 at the Longjiang Gymnasium.

This event was the lightest of the girl's judo weight classes, limiting competitors to a maximum of 44 kilograms of body mass. The tournament bracket consisted of a single-elimination contest culminating in a gold medal match. There was also a repechage to determine the winners of the two bronze medals. Each judoka who had lost before the finals competed in the repechage with the two finalists getting bronze medals.

== Results ==
=== Main Bracket ===
Round of 16

Quarterfinals
Honoka Yamauchi (JPN)
Bye
Pamela Paula Quizhpi (ECU) | 000
Melisa Çakmaklı (TUR) | 100
Leyla Aliyeva (AZE) | 101
Adiya Saiyn (KAZ) | 000
Anastasya Turcheva (RUS) | 001
Estefania Soriano (DOM) | 000

Semifinals
Honoka Yamauchi (JPN) | 000
Melisa Çakmaklı (TUR) | 001
Leyla Aliyeva (AZE) | 000
Anastasya Turcheva (RUS) | 000

Finals
Melisa Çakmaklı (TUR) | 000
Leyla Aliyeva (AZE) | 000

=== Repechage ===
Repechage 1
Bye
Pamela Paula Quizhpi (ECU)
Bye
Estefania Soriano (DOM)
Bye
Adiya Saiyn (KAZ)

Repechage 2
Pamela Paula Quizhpi (ECU)
Bye
Estefania Soriano (DOM) | 100
Adiya Saiyn (KAZ) | 000

Bronze Medal Finals
Pamela Paula Quizhpi (ECU) | 000
Anastasya Turcheva (RUS) | 000
Estefania Soriano (DOM) | 000
Honoka Yamauchi (JPN) | 010
