= Francesca Milani =

Italian judoka (born 1993)

Personal information
- Born: 25 September 1993 (age 32) Rome, Italy
- Occupation: Judoka

Sport
- Country: Italy
- Sport: Judo
- Weight class: ‍–‍48 kg

Achievements and titles
- Olympic Games: R32 (2020)
- World Champ.: R16 (2023)
- European Champ.: 5th (2022)
Medal record
Women's judo
Representing Italy
IJF Grand Slam
Gold medal – first place	2021 Antalya	‍–‍48 kg
Silver medal – second place	2021 Tbilisi	‍–‍48 kg
Silver medal – second place	2022 Tel Aviv	‍–‍48 kg
Silver medal – second place	2022 Abu Dhabi	‍–‍48 kg
Silver medal – second place	2022 Baku	‍–‍48 kg
Bronze medal – third place	2021 Kazan	‍–‍48 kg
Bronze medal – third place	2026 Astana	‍–‍48 kg
IJF Grand Prix
Bronze medal – third place	2023 Linz	‍–‍48 kg
Mediterranean Games
Bronze medal – third place	2018 Tarragona	‍–‍48 kg

Profile at external databases
- IJF: 14728
- JudoInside.com: 74935
- Updated on 9 May 2026

Francesca Milani (born 25 September 1993) is an Italian judoka. Born in Rome, in 2018 she won one of the bronze medals in the women's 48 kg event at the Mediterranean Games held in Tarragona, Spain. She competed at several editions of the World Judo Championships. She competed at the 2020 Summer Olympics held in Tokyo, Japan.

== Career ==
In 2020, Milani was eliminated in her first match in the women's 48 kg event at the European Judo Championships held in Prague, Czech Republic.

In 2021, Milani won the silver medal in her event at the Judo Grand Slam Tbilisi held in Tbilisi, Georgia and the gold medal at the Judo Grand Slam Antalya held in Antalya, Turkey. In June 2021, she competed in the women's 48 kg event at the World Judo Championships held in Budapest, Hungary. In July 2021, she represented Italy at the 2020 Summer Olympics in Tokyo, Japan. She competed in the women's 48 kg event where she was eliminated in her first match by Lin Chen-hao of Chinese Taipei.

Milani won the silver medal in her event at the 2022 Judo Grand Slam Tel Aviv held in Tel Aviv, Israel.

She competed in the women's 48 kg event at the 2023 World Judo Championships held in Doha, Qatar.
