= Katryna Esposito =

Maltese judoka (born 2000)

Personal information
- Full name: Katryna Esposito
- Born: 11 August 2000 (age 25) Malta
- Education: University of Malta
- Occupation: Judoka

Sport
- Country: Malta
- Sport: Judo
- Weight class: ‍–‍48 kg
- Club: Tigne Judo Club
- Team: Malta National Judo Team

Achievements and titles
- Olympic Games: R32 (2024)
- World Champ.: R32 (2023, 2024, 2025)
- European Champ.: R16 (2025)
- Commonwealth Games: (bronze) (2022, 2026)
Medal record
Women's judo
Representing Malta
Commonwealth Games
Bronze medal – third place	2022 Birmingham	‍–‍48 kg
Bronze medal – third place	2026 Glasgow	‍–‍48 kg

Profile at external databases
- IJF: 39470
- JudoInside.com: 97375
- Updated on 1 August 2026

Katryna Esposito (born 11 August 2000) is a Maltese judoka. She won a bronze medal in the women's 48 kg category at the 2022 Commonwealth Games in Birmingham, England. It was Malta's first and only medal in this edition of the games. She was awarded Sportiva Tas-Sena at the SportMalta Awards Għażliet Sportivi Nazzjonali in 2023. Esposito represented Malta at the 2024 Summer Olympics in Paris, France, losing in the women's 48 kg first round to eventual silver medalist Bavuudorjiin Baasankhüü of Mongolia. At the 2026 Commonwealth Games in Glasgow, Scotland, she won a bronze medal in the women's 48 kg.
