= Natsumi Tsunoda =

Japanese judoka (born 1992)

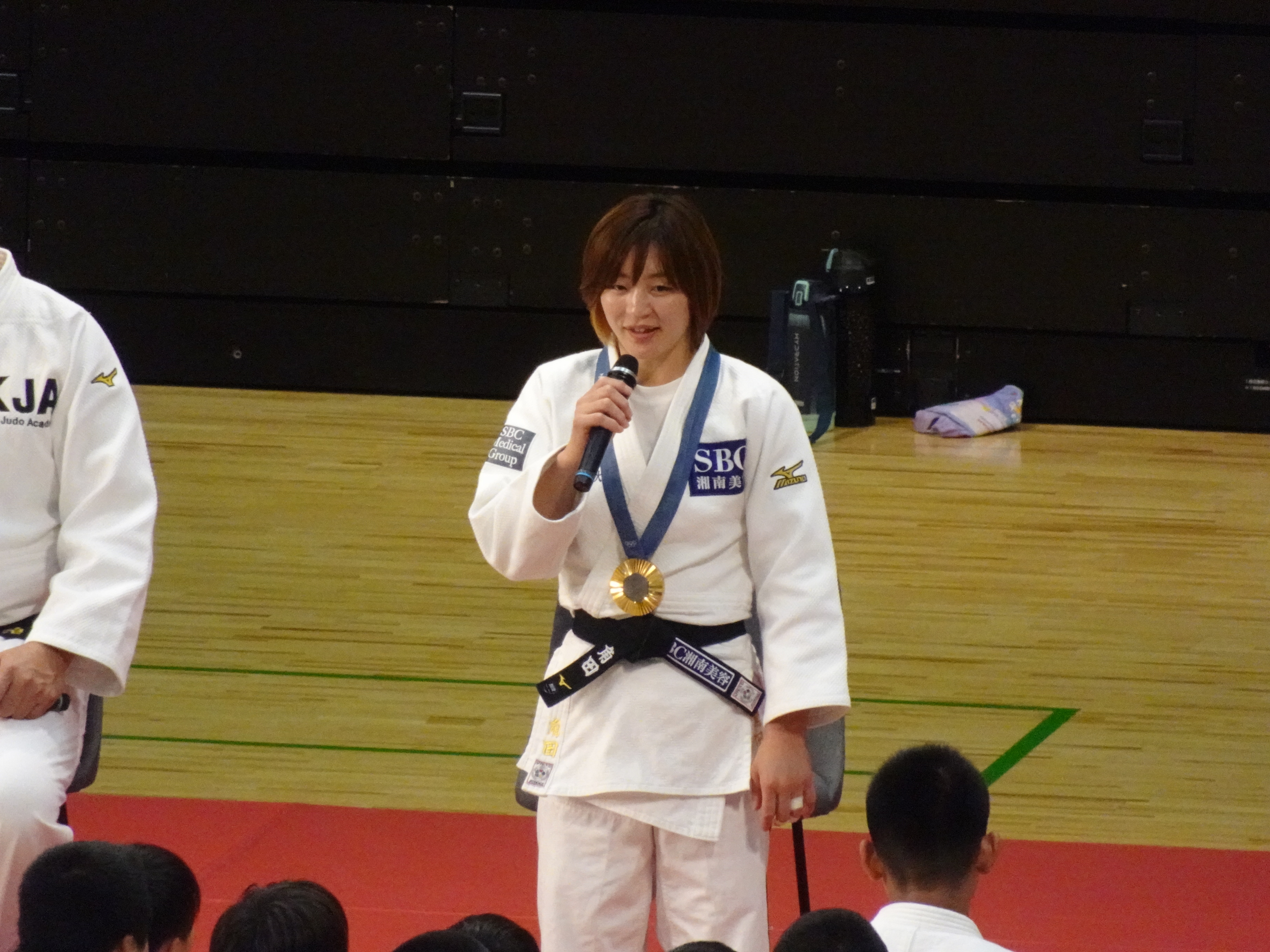
- Natsumi Tsunoda in 2024

Personal information
- Born: 角田夏実; 6 August 1992 (age 34) Yachiyo, Chiba
- Occupation: Judoka
- Height: 162 cm (5 ft 4 in)

Sport
- Country: Japan
- Sport: Judo
- Weight class: ‍–‍48 kg, ‍–‍52 kg
- Rank: 5th dan black belt
- Club: SBC Shonan Beauty Clinic Judo Club
- Coached by: Yūko Imai
- Retired: 30 January 2026

Achievements and titles
- Olympic Games: (gold) (2024)
- World Champ.: (gold) (2021, 2022, 2023)
- Asian Champ.: (gold) (2018, 2023)
- Highest world ranking: 1^{st}
Medal record
Women's judo
Representing Japan
Olympic Games
Gold medal – first place	2024 Paris	‍–‍48 kg
Silver medal – second place	2024 Paris	Mixed team
World Championships
Gold medal – first place	2021 Budapest	‍–‍48 kg
Gold medal – first place	2022 Tashkent	‍–‍48 kg
Gold medal – first place	2023 Doha	‍–‍48 kg
Silver medal – second place	2017 Budapest	‍–‍52 kg
Asian Games
Gold medal – first place	2018 Jakarta	‍–‍52 kg
Gold medal – first place	2023 Hangzhou	‍–‍48 kg
World Masters
Gold medal – first place	2018 Guangzhou	‍–‍52 kg
IJF Grand Slam
Gold medal – first place	2016 Tokyo	‍–‍52 kg
Gold medal – first place	2022 Paris	‍–‍48 kg
Gold medal – first place	2022 Ulaanbaatar	‍–‍48 kg
Gold medal – first place	2023 Tokyo	‍–‍48 kg
Gold medal – first place	2024 Antalya	‍–‍48 kg
Gold medal – first place	2025 Baku	‍–‍48 kg
Silver medal – second place	2017 Paris	‍–‍52 kg
Silver medal – second place	2018 Osaka	‍–‍52 kg
Silver medal – second place	2019 Paris	‍–‍52 kg
Silver medal – second place	2021 Tashkent	‍–‍48 kg
Bronze medal – third place	2019 Brasilia	‍–‍52 kg
Bronze medal – third place	2019 Osaka	‍–‍48 kg
Bronze medal – third place	2022 Tokyo	‍–‍48 kg
IJF Grand Prix
Gold medal – first place	2018 Budapest	‍–‍52 kg
Gold medal – first place	2019 Zagreb	‍–‍52 kg
Gold medal – first place	2020 Tel Aviv	‍–‍48 kg

Profile at external databases
- IJF: 35695
- JudoInside.com: 108860
- Updated on 19 May 2025

Natsumi Tsunoda (Japanese: 角田夏実; born 6 August 1992) is a Japanese retired judoka. She won the gold medal at the women's 48 kg event at the 2024 Summer Olympics.

== Career ==
Tsunoda won the gold medal in the women's 48 kg event at the 2021 World Judo Championships held in Budapest, Hungary. She also won the gold medal in this event in 2022 and 2023.

Tsunoda won a silver medal at the 2017 World Judo Championships in Budapest.

Tsunoda won the gold medal in the women's 48 kg event at the 2023 World Judo Championships held in Doha, Qatar.

Tsunoda announced her retirement in January 2026.
