= Geronay Whitebooi =

South African judoka (born 1996)

Personal information
- Born: 2 January 1996 (age 30)
- Occupation: Judoka

Sport
- Country: South Africa
- Sport: Judo
- Weight class: ‍–‍48 kg

Achievements and titles
- Olympic Games: R16 (2024)
- World Champ.: R32 (2019, 2021, 2024)
- African Champ.: (gold) (2019, 2020)
- Commonwealth Games: (gold) (2022)
Medal record
Women's judo
Representing South Africa
African Games
Silver medal – second place	2019 Rabat	‍–‍48 kg
Bronze medal – third place	2023 Accra	‍–‍48 kg
African Championships
Gold medal – first place	2019 Cape Town	‍–‍48 kg
Gold medal – first place	2020 Antananarivo	‍–‍48 kg
Bronze medal – third place	2018 Tunis	‍–‍48 kg
Bronze medal – third place	2022 Oran	‍–‍48 kg
Bronze medal – third place	2023 Casablanca	‍–‍48 kg
African Junior Championships
Gold medal – first place	2015 Sharm El Sheikh	‍–‍48 kg
Bronze medal – third place	2014 Tunis	‍–‍48 kg
Commonwealth Games
Gold medal – first place	2022 Birmingham	‍–‍48 kg

Profile at external databases
- IJF: 11190
- JudoInside.com: 79654
- Updated on 27 July 2024

Geronay Michaela Whitebooi (born 2 January 1996) is a South African judoka. She is a silver medalist at the 2019 African Games and a four-time medalist, including two golds, at the African Judo Championships.

Whitebooi represented South Africa at the 2020 Summer Olympics in Tokyo, Japan. She competed in the women's 48 kg event. Whitebooi won the gold medal in the 2022 Commonwealth Games in the women's 48 kg category.

== Achievements ==
Year	Tournament	Place	Weight class
2018	African Championships	3rd	−48 kg
2019	African Championships	1st	−48 kg
2019	African Games	2nd	−48 kg
2020	African Championships	1st	−48 kg
2022	African Championships	3rd	−48 kg
2022	Commonwealth Games	1st	−48 kg
2024	African Games	3rd	−48 kg
