= Asmita Dey =

Indian judoka (born 2003)

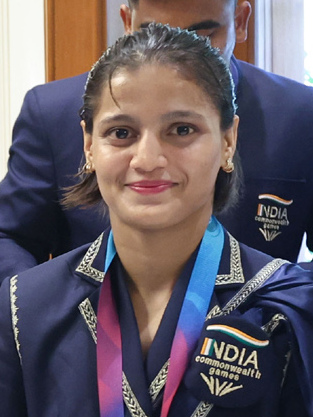
- Dey in August 2026

Personal information
- Born: 22 March 2003 (age 23)
- Occupation: Judoka
- Police career
- Branch: Uttar Pradesh Police
- Service years: 2023–present
- Rank: Sub-inspector

Sport
- Country: India
- Sport: Judo
- Weight class: ‍–‍48 kg

Achievements and titles
- World Champ.: R32 (2024, 2025, 2026)
- Asian Champ.: 5th (2026)
- Commonwealth Games: (gold) (2026)
Medal record
Women's judo
Representing India
Asian Junior Championships
Bronze medal – third place	2022 Bangkok	‍–‍48 kg
Commonwealth Games
Gold medal – first place	2026 Glasgow	‍–‍48 kg

Profile at external databases
- IJF: 69881
- JudoInside.com: 161604
- Updated on 4 October 2026

Asmita Dey (born 22 March 2003) is an Indian judoka from Belonia, Tripura who competes in the women's 48 kg category. She won the gold medal in the women's 48 kg event at the 2026 Commonwealth Games, becoming the first Indian judoka to win a Commonwealth Games gold medal. She had also won gold medals at the 2023 Macau Junior Asian Cup and the 2025 Casablanca African Open.

== Early life ==
Asmita Dey was born on 22 March 2003 in Belonia in South Tripura district of Tripura and settled in Varanasi. She has three siblings, and her father, Arjun Kumar Dey, runs a bicycle repair shop. Her father died in December 2025.

Dey initially trained as an 800 metres runner before taking up judo. She initially trained under Bina Debnath at the Belonia Vidyapeeth Coaching Centre and later under Manik Lal Deb at the Tripura Sports School. She later joined the Sports Authority of India Regional Centre in Bhopal, where she trained under Yashpal Solanki. She was subsequently inducted into the Target Olympic Podium Scheme.

== Career ==
Dey won the gold medal in the women's 48 kg category at the 2023 Junior Asian Cup held in Macau in July 2023. Later that year, she won the silver medal at the Asian Open at Kuwait. She won the gold medal at the Khelo India University Games and was later crowned junior national champion for 2023–24. In 2025, she claimed the gold medal at the African Open in Casablanca. She finished seventh in the 2025 Asian Judo Championships at Bangkok and improved to fifth in the 2026 Asian Judo Championships at Ordos City in April 2026.

Dey represented India at the 2026 Commonwealth Games in Glasgow. In the women's 48 kg event, she defeated Canada's Heidi Quach in the final by scoring a waza-ari during the golden score period to win the gold medal. The victory made her the first Indian judoka to win a Commonwealth Games gold medal.
