= Julia Figueroa =

Spanish judoka (born 1991)

Personal information
- Nationality: Spanish
- Born: 7 April 1991 (age 35) Córdoba, Spain
- Occupation: Judoka
- Height: 1.50 m (4 ft 11 in)

Sport
- Country: Spain
- Sport: Judo
- Weight class: ‍–‍48 kg

Achievements and titles
- Olympic Games: R16 (2016, 2020)
- World Champ.: (bronze) (2021)
- European Champ.: (bronze) (2019, 2022)
Medal record
Women's judo
Representing Spain
World Championships
Bronze medal – third place	2021 Budapest	‍–‍48 kg
European Games
Bronze medal – third place	2019 Minsk	‍–‍48 kg
European Championships
Bronze medal – third place	2022 Sofia	‍–‍48 kg
World Masters
Bronze medal – third place	2016 Guadalajara	‍–‍48 kg
IJF Grand Slam
Gold medal – first place	2015 Tyumen	‍–‍48 kg
Gold medal – first place	2016 Baku	‍–‍48 kg
Gold medal – first place	2022 Abu Dhabi	‍–‍48 kg
Silver medal – second place	2019 Ekaterinburg	‍–‍48 kg
Silver medal – second place	2019 Baku	‍–‍48 kg
Silver medal – second place	2019 Osaka	‍–‍48 kg
Silver medal – second place	2022 Budapest	‍–‍48 kg
Silver medal – second place	2023 Tokyo	‍–‍48 kg
Bronze medal – third place	2015 Paris	‍–‍48 kg
Bronze medal – third place	2020 Düsseldorf	‍–‍48 kg
Bronze medal – third place	2021 Tel Aviv	‍–‍48 kg
Bronze medal – third place	2021 Tbilisi	‍–‍48 kg
Bronze medal – third place	2022 Tel Aviv	‍–‍48 kg
IJF Grand Prix
Gold medal – first place	2019 Marrakesh	‍–‍48 kg
Silver medal – second place	2014 Zagreb	‍–‍48 kg
Silver medal – second place	2015 Tbilisi	‍–‍48 kg
Bronze medal – third place	2013 Jeju	‍–‍48 kg
Bronze medal – third place	2014 Havana	‍–‍48 kg
Bronze medal – third place	2018 Agadir	‍–‍48 kg
Bronze medal – third place	2018 Cancún	‍–‍48 kg
Bronze medal – third place	2019 Budapest	‍–‍48 kg
Bronze medal – third place	2019 Perth	‍–‍48 kg

Profile at external databases
- IJF: 3239
- JudoInside.com: 42994
- Updated on 3 December 2023

Julia Figueroa (born 7 April 1991) is a Spanish judoka. She competed at the 2016 Summer Olympics in the women's 48 kg event, in which she was eliminated in the second round by Dayaris Mestre Álvarez.

In 2021, she competed in the women's 48 kg event at the 2021 Judo World Masters held in Doha, Qatar. A month later, she won one of the bronze medals in her event at the 2021 Judo Grand Slam Tel Aviv held in Tel Aviv, Israel. In June 2021, she won one of the bronze medals in the women's 48 kg event at the 2021 World Judo Championships held in Budapest, Hungary.

She won one of the bronze medals in her event at the 2022 Judo Grand Slam Tel Aviv held in Tel Aviv, Israel.
