= Natasha Ferreira =

Brazilian judoka (born 1999)

Personal information
- Full name: Natasha Padilha Ferreira
- Born: 1 June 1999 (age 27) Curitiba, Paraná
- Occupation: Judoka

Sport
- Country: Brazil
- Sport: Judo
- Weight class: ‍–‍48 kg

Achievements and titles
- Olympic Games: R32 (2024)
- World Champ.: 7th (2024)
- Pan American Champ.: (2025)
Medal record
Women's judo
Representing Brazil
Pan American Championships
Gold medal – first place	2025 Santiago	‍–‍48 kg
Bronze medal – third place	2023 Calgary	‍–‍48 kg
IJF Grand Slam
Bronze medal – third place	2023 Tel Aviv	‍–‍48 kg
Bronze medal – third place	2025 Astana	‍–‍48 kg
Pan American Junior Championships
Bronze medal – third place	2019 Cali	‍–‍48 kg
Pan American Cadet Championships
Gold medal – first place	2016 Cordoba	‍–‍44 kg

Profile at external databases
- IJF: 23948
- JudoInside.com: 97653
- Updated on 14 May 2025

Natasha Padilha Ferreira (born 1 June 1999 in Curitiba, Paraná) is a Brazilian judoka.

In July 2024, she was named to the Brazilian national judo team for the 2024 Paris Olympics.

Ferreira won a gold medal at the 2025 Pan American-Oceania Championships, in the ‍–‍48 kg category.
