= Tuğçe Beder =

Turkish judoka (born 1999)

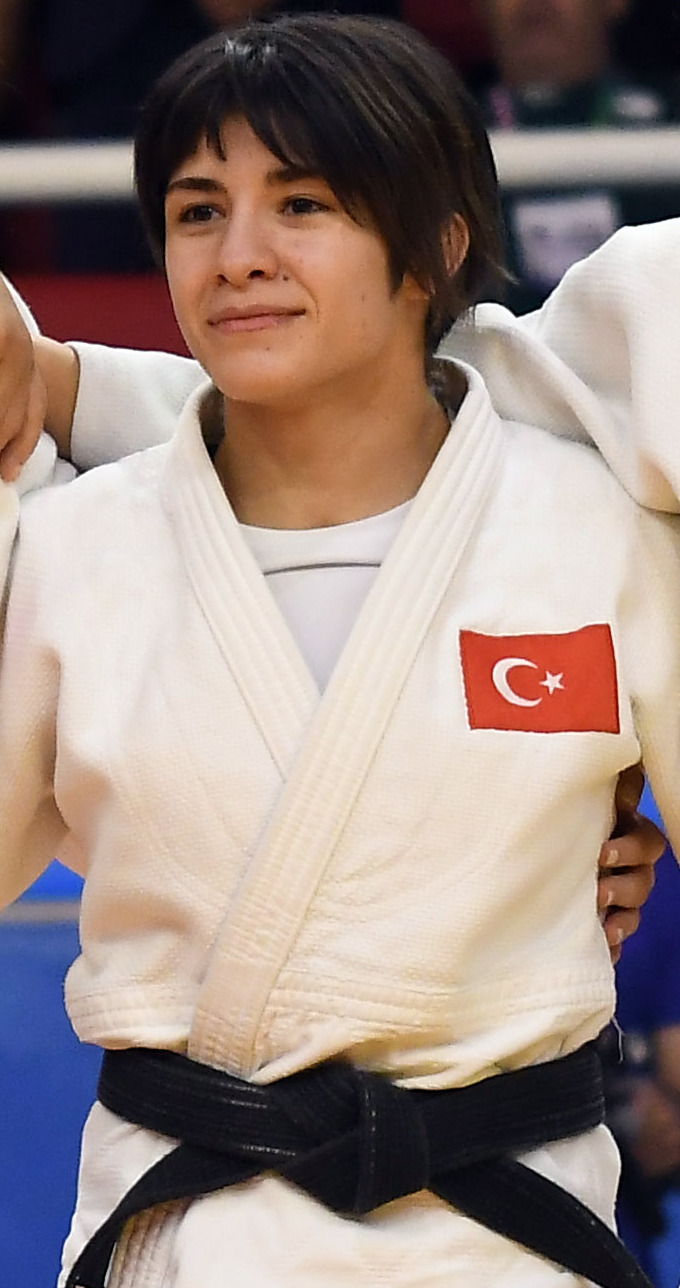
- Beder in 2022

Personal information
- Born: 15 November 1999 (age 26) Kocaeli, Turkey
- Occupation: Judoka

Sport
- Country: Turkey
- Sport: Judo
- Weight class: ‍–‍48 kg
- Rank: Black belt

Achievements and titles
- Olympic Games: R32 (2024)
- World Champ.: 5th (2024)
- European Champ.: 5th (2024)
Medal record
Women's judo
Representing Turkey
IJF Grand Slam
Gold medal – first place	2026 Tbilisi	‍–‍48 kg
Silver medal – second place	2024 Dushanbe	‍–‍48 kg
Bronze medal – third place	2023 Tashkent	‍–‍48 kg
Bronze medal – third place	2024 Tashkent	‍–‍48 kg
Bronze medal – third place	2024 Astana	‍–‍48 kg
Bronze medal – third place	2026 Ulaanbaatar	‍–‍48 kg
IJF Grand Prix
Silver medal – second place	2026 Qingdao	‍–‍48 kg
Bronze medal – third place	2020 Tel Aviv	‍–‍48 kg
Bronze medal – third place	2022 Zagreb	‍–‍48 kg
Bronze medal – third place	2023 Perth	‍–‍48 kg
European U23 Championships
Bronze medal – third place	2019 Izhevsk	‍–‍48 kg
European Junior Championships
Silver medal – second place	2018 Sofia	‍–‍48 kg
World Cadets Championships
Bronze medal – third place	2015 Sarajevo	‍–‍48 kg
Mediterranean Games
Gold medal – first place	2026 Taranto	‍–‍48 kg
Islamic Solidarity Games
Gold medal – first place	2021 Konya	‍–‍48 kg
Gold medal – first place	2021 Konya	Women's team
Gold medal – first place	2025 Riyadh	‍–‍48 kg

Profile at external databases
- IJF: 20932
- JudoInside.com: 33192
- Updated on 1 September 2026

Tuğçe Beder (born 15 November 1999) is a Turkish female judoka competing in the ‍–‍48 kg division. She participated at the 2024 Olympics in Paris, France.

== Career ==
Beder started performing judo as a hobby during her middle school year in 2012. She continued professionally with the encouragement of her teachers. She won several titles at domestic and international competitions. She is a member of Kocaeli Büyükşehir Belediyesi Kağıt Spor Kulübü in the Dan 2 of black belt rank.

=== 2015 ===
Beder won her first international medal, a bronze medal, at the 2015 World Judo Cadets Championships in Sarajevo, Bosnia and Herzegovina.

=== 2016 ===
She ranked first in the world list for the Girls' Cadet -48 kg category.

=== 2018 ===
Beder received the silver medal in the -48 kg division at the 2018 European Junior Judo Championships in Sofia, Bulgaria after she could not complete the competition due to her shoulder injury in the final.

=== 2019 ===
She participated in the featherweight (-52 kg) division at the 2019 Summer Universiade in Naples, Italy.

At the 2019 European U23 Judo Championships in Izhevsk, Russia, she won the bronze medal in the Extra-lightweight (−48 kg) division.

=== 2020 ===
She took the bronze medal at the 2020 Judo Grand Prix Tel Aviv in Israel.

=== 2022 ===
At the 2022 Judo Grand Prix Zagreb, Croatia, she received the bronze medal.

She claimed the gold medal at the 2021 Islamic Solidarity Games in Konya, Turkey.

She placed fifth at the 2022 World Judo Championships – Women's 48 kg in Tashkent, Uzbekistan.

At the 2022 European Universities Games in Łódź, Poland, she took the silver medal after losing to her countrywoman Sıla Ersin in the final.

=== 2023 ===
Beder became bronze medalist at the 2023 Judo Grand Slam Tashkent in Uzbekistan, and at the 2023 Judo Oceania Open Perth in Australia.

At the 2023 European Judo Championships in Montpellier, France, she failed to advance from the first round.

=== 2024 ===
She took the bronze medal at the 2024 Judo Grand Slam Tashkent in Uzbekistan, the silver medal at the 2024 Judo Grand Slam Dushanbe in Tajikistan, and the bronze medal at the 2024 Judo Grand Slam Astana in Kazakhstan.

She lost the repechage match for the bronze medal at the 2024 European Judo Championships in Zagreb, Croatia.

She competed at the 2024 World Judo Championships in Abu Dhabi, United Arab Emirates. She lost the repechage match for the bronze medal. Her fifth place in the -48 kg division was sufficient for her qualification to represent her country at the 2024 Olympics in Paris, France.

== Personal life ==
Tuğçe Beder was born in İzmit, Turkey on 5 November 1999. After completing high school, she studied sports coaching at the School of Physical Education and Sports at Kastamonu University.
