= Abiba Abuzhakynova =

Kazakhstani judoka (born 1997)

- Abuzhakynova in 2024

Personal information
- Native name: Әбиба Әбужақынова
- Born: 4 July 1997 (age 29) Gʻazalkent, Uzbekistan
- Occupation: Judoka

Sport
- Country: Kazakhstan
- Sport: Judo
- Weight class: ‍–‍48 kg

Achievements and titles
- Olympic Games: 5th (2024)
- World Champ.: (silver) (2025)
- Asian Champ.: (silver) (2021, 2022, 2023)
- Highest world ranking: 1^{st}
Medal record
Women's judo
Representing Kazakhstan
World Championships
Silver medal – second place	2025 Budapest	‍–‍48 kg
Bronze medal – third place	2022 Tashkent	‍–‍48 kg
Bronze medal – third place	2024 Abu Dhabi	‍–‍48 kg
Asian Games
Silver medal – second place	2023 Hangzhou	‍–‍48 kg
Silver medal – second place	2026 Aichi‑Nagoya	‍–‍48 kg
Asian Championships
Silver medal – second place	2021 Bishkek	‍–‍48 kg
Silver medal – second place	2022 Nur‑Sultan	‍–‍48 kg
IJF Grand Slam
Silver medal – second place	2024 Tashkent	‍–‍48 kg
Bronze medal – third place	2022 Ulaanbaatar	‍–‍48 kg
Bronze medal – third place	2022 Abu Dhabi	‍–‍48 kg
Bronze medal – third place	2023 Paris	‍–‍48 kg
Bronze medal – third place	2023 Tbilisi	‍–‍48 kg
Bronze medal – third place	2024 Baku	‍–‍48 kg
Bronze medal – third place	2024 Antalya	‍–‍48 kg
Bronze medal – third place	2024 Abu Dhabi	‍–‍48 kg
Bronze medal – third place	2025 Dushanbe	‍–‍48 kg
Bronze medal – third place	2025 Abu Dhabi	‍–‍48 kg
IJF Grand Prix
Gold medal – first place	2023 Almada	‍–‍48 kg
Gold medal – first place	2025 Linz	‍–‍48 kg
Bronze medal – third place	2024 Odivelas	‍–‍48 kg
World Juniors Championships
Silver medal – second place	2017 Zagreb	‍–‍44 kg

Profile at external databases
- IJF: 31904
- JudoInside.com: 100475
- Updated on 30 September 2026

Abiba Abuzhakynova (Kazakh: Әбиба Әбужақынова, romanized: Äbiba Äbujaqynova; born 4 July 1997) is a Kazakhstani judoka. She won one of the bronze medals in the women's 48 kg event at the 2022 World Judo Championships held in Tashkent, Uzbekistan. She also won a bronze medal in this event at the 2024 World Judo Championships held in Abu Dhabi, United Arab Emirates.

Abuzhakynova won the silver medal in her event at the 2021 Asian-Pacific Judo Championships held in Bishkek, Kyrgyzstan. She competed in the women's 48 kg event at the 2021 World Judo Championships held in Budapest, Hungary.

Abuzhakynova lost her bronze medal match in the women's 48 kg event at the 2023 World Judo Championships held in Doha, Qatar.

Abuzhakynova represented Kazakhstan at the 2024 Summer Olympics in Paris, France. She lost her bronze medal match in the women's 48 kg event.
