= Amber Gersjes =

Dutch judoka (born 1997)

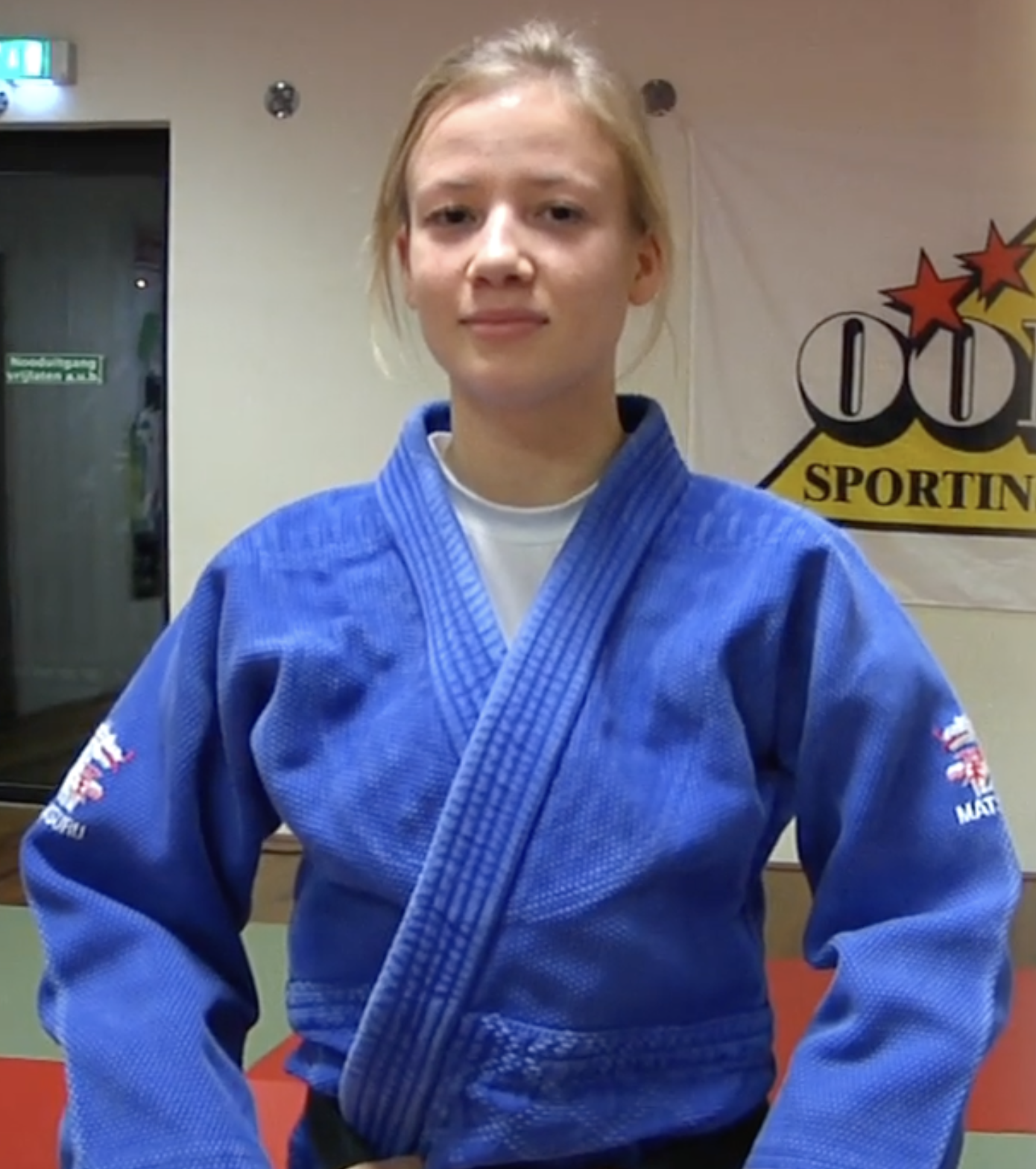
- Amber Gersjes in a dojo in 2015

Personal information
- Nationality: Dutch
- Born: 23 June 1997 (age 29) Tilburg, Netherlands
- Occupation: Judoka

Sport
- Country: Netherlands
- Sport: Judo
- Weight class: ‍–‍48 kg

Achievements and titles
- World Champ.: R16 (2026)
- European Champ.: 5th (2025)
Medal record
Women's judo
Representing the Netherlands
IJF Grand Slam
Gold medal – first place	2026 Astana	‍–‍48 kg
Silver medal – second place	2026 Dushanbe	‍–‍48 kg
IJF Grand Prix
Bronze medal – third place	2021 Zagreb	‍–‍48 kg
Bronze medal – third place	2024 Linz	‍–‍48 kg
Bronze medal – third place	2024 Zagreb	‍–‍48 kg
Bronze medal – third place	2026 Linz	‍–‍48 kg
Bronze medal – third place	2026 Zagreb	‍–‍48 kg
World Juniors Championships
Gold medal – first place	2017 Zagreb	‍–‍48 kg
European Junior Championships
Gold medal – first place	2015 Oberwart	‍–‍44 kg
Gold medal – first place	2017 Maribor	‍–‍48 kg
European Cadet Championships
Gold medal – first place	2012 Bar	‍–‍40 kg
Bronze medal – third place	2013 Tallinn	‍–‍44 kg
Summer Universiade
Silver medal – second place	2021 Chengdu	‍–‍48 kg

Profile at external databases
- IJF: 13478
- JudoInside.com: 55019
- Updated on 15 November 2026

Amber Gersjes (born 23 June 1997) is a Dutch judoka. She won a bronze medal at the 2021 Zagreb Grand Prix.
