= Priscilla Morand =

Mauritian judoka

Personal information
- Born: 24 November 1993 (age 32)
- Occupation: Judoka

Sport
- Country: Mauritius
- Sport: Judo
- Weight class: ‍–‍48 kg

Achievements and titles
- World Champ.: R32 (2021, 2024)
- African Champ.: (gold) (2022)
Medal record
Women's judo
Representing Mauritius
African Games
Silver medal – second place	2023 Accra	‍–‍48 kg
African Championships
Gold medal – first place	2022 Oran	‍–‍48 kg
Silver medal – second place	2021 Dakar	‍–‍48 kg
Bronze medal – third place	2014 Port Louis	‍–‍48 kg
Bronze medal – third place	2019 Cape Town	‍–‍48 kg
Bronze medal – third place	2020 Antananarivo	‍–‍48 kg

Profile at external databases
- IJF: 49900
- JudoInside.com: 49949
- Updated on 19 May 2024

Priscilla Morand is a Mauritian judoka. She won the gold medal in the women's 48 kg event at the 2022 African Judo Championships held in Oran, Algeria. In 2021, she won the silver medal in her event at the African Judo Championships held in Dakar, Senegal. She also won one of the bronze medals in this event in 2014, 2019 and 2020.

== Achievements ==
Year	Tournament	Place	Weight class
2014	African Championships	3rd	−48 kg
2019	African Championships	3rd	−48 kg
2020	African Championships	3rd	−48 kg
2021	African Championships	2nd	−48 kg
2022	African Championships	1st	−48 kg
2024	African Games	2nd	−48 kg
