= Assunta Scutto =

Italian judoka (born 2002)

Personal information
- Born: 17 January 2002 (age 24) Naples, Italy
- Occupation: Judoka
- Height: 160 cm (5 ft 3 in)

Sport
- Country: Italy
- Sport: Judo
- Weight class: ‍–‍48 kg
- Club: Fiamme Gialle
- Coached by: Antonio Ciano, Francesco Bruyere

Achievements and titles
- Olympic Games: 7th (2024)
- World Champ.: (gold) (2025)
- European Champ.: (bronze) (2025)
- Highest world ranking: 1^{st}
Medal record
Women's judo
Representing Italy
World Championships
Gold medal – first place	2025 Budapest	‍–‍48 kg
Silver medal – second place	2024 Abu Dhabi	‍–‍48 kg
Silver medal – second place	2026 Baku	‍–‍48 kg
Bronze medal – third place	2022 Tashkent	‍–‍48 kg
Bronze medal – third place	2023 Doha	‍–‍48 kg
European Championships
Bronze medal – third place	2025 Podgorica	‍–‍48 kg
World Masters
Bronze medal – third place	2022 Jerusalem	‍–‍48 kg
Bronze medal – third place	2023 Budapest	‍–‍48 kg
IJF Grand Slam
Gold medal – first place	2021 Abu Dhabi	‍–‍48 kg
Gold medal – first place	2023 Astana	‍–‍48 kg
Gold medal – first place	2023 Baku	‍–‍48 kg
Gold medal – first place	2023 Abu Dhabi	‍–‍48 kg
Bronze medal – third place	2024 Paris	‍–‍48 kg
Bronze medal – third place	2025 Astana	‍–‍48 kg
IJF Grand Prix
Gold medal – first place	2026 Lima	‍–‍48 kg
Gold medal – first place	2026 Zagreb	‍–‍48 kg
World Juniors Championships
Gold medal – first place	2021 Olbia	‍–‍48 kg
Silver medal – second place	2022 Guayaquil	‍–‍48 kg
European Junior Championships
Bronze medal – third place	2021 Luxembourg	‍–‍48 kg
World Cadets Championships
Bronze medal – third place	2019 Almaty	‍–‍48 kg
European Cadet Championships
Gold medal – first place	2019 Warsaw	‍–‍48 kg
Silver medal – second place	2018 Sarajevo	‍–‍48 kg

Profile at external databases
- IJF: 36429
- JudoInside.com: 111259
- Updated on 15 November 2026

Assunta Scutto (born 17 January 2002) is an Italian judoka. She won the silver medal in the women's 48 kg event at the 2024 World Judo Championships held in Abu Dhabi, United Arab Emirates.

Scutto won bronze medals at the 2022 and 2023 World Championships.
