= Ganbaataryn Narantsetseg =

Mongolian judoka (born 1995)

Personal information
- Born: 21 January 1995 (age 31)
- Occupation: Judoka

Sport
- Country: Mongolia
- Sport: Judo
- Weight class: ‍–‍48 kg

Achievements and titles
- World Champ.: 7th (2024)
- Asian Champ.: (bronze) (2022)
Medal record
Representing Mongolia
Women's judo
Asian Games
Bronze medal – third place	2026 Aichi‑Nagoya	‍–‍48 kg
Asian Championships
Bronze medal – third place	2022 Nur‑Sultan	‍–‍48 kg
World Masters
Silver medal – second place	2019 Qingdao	‍–‍48 kg
IJF Grand Slam
Gold medal – first place	2022 Antalya	‍–‍48 kg
Gold medal – first place	2025 Tbilisi	‍–‍48 kg
Silver medal – second place	2022 Ulaanbaatar	‍–‍48 kg
Silver medal – second place	2026 Astana	‍–‍48 kg
Bronze medal – third place	2018 Ekaterinburg	‍–‍48 kg
Bronze medal – third place	2020 Budapest	‍–‍48 kg
Bronze medal – third place	2023 Tbilisi	‍–‍48 kg
Bronze medal – third place	2023 Antalya	‍–‍48 kg
Bronze medal – third place	2024 Antalya	‍–‍48 kg
IJF Grand Prix
Bronze medal – third place	2023 Dushanbe	‍–‍48 kg
Bronze medal – third place	2024 Odivelas	‍–‍48 kg
Bronze medal – third place	2025 Qingdao	‍–‍48 kg
World Juniors Championships
Bronze medal – third place	2015 Abu Dhabi	‍–‍44 kg
Asian Junior Championships
Silver medal – second place	2013 Hainan	‍–‍44 kg
Bronze medal – third place	2014 Hong Kong	‍–‍44 kg
Women's sambo
Asian Games
Gold medal – first place	2018 Jakarta	‍–‍48 kg

Profile at external databases
- IJF: 14604
- JudoInside.com: 55930
- Updated on 30 September 2026

Ganbaataryn Narantsetseg (Mongolian: Ганбаатарын Наранцэцэг; born 21 January 1995) is a Mongolian judoka.

She is the silver medallist of the 2019 Judo World Masters in the ‍–‍48 kg category.
