= Lee Hye-kyeong =

South Korean judoka (born 1996)

Personal information
- Born: 12 January 1996 (age 30) Ulsan, South Korea
- Occupation: Judoka

Sport
- Country: South Korea
- Sport: Judo
- Weight class: ‍–‍48 kg

Achievements and titles
- Olympic Games: R32 (2024)
- World Champ.: R16 (2022)
- Asian Champ.: (silver) (2024)
Medal record
Women's judo
Representing South Korea
Olympic Games
Bronze medal – third place	2024 Paris	Mixed team
Asian Championships
Silver medal – second place	2024 Hong Kong	‍–‍48 kg
Bronze medal – third place	2019 Fujairah	‍–‍48 kg
Bronze medal – third place	2022 Nur‑Sultan	‍–‍48 kg
IJF Grand Slam
Gold medal – first place	2024 Tbilisi	‍–‍48 kg
Bronze medal – third place	2022 Ulaanbaatar	‍–‍48 kg
IJF Grand Prix
Silver medal – second place	2022 Almada	‍–‍48 kg
Bronze medal – third place	2024 Linz	‍–‍48 kg
World Juniors Championships
Gold medal – first place	2015 Abu Dhabi	‍–‍44 kg
Asian Junior Championships
Gold medal – first place	2014 Hong Kong	‍–‍48 kg
World Cadets Championships
Silver medal – second place	2013 Miami	‍–‍48 kg
Youth Olympic Games
Bronze medal – third place	2014 Nanjing	‍–‍52 kg

Profile at external databases
- IJF: 13675
- JudoInside.com: 15147
- Updated on 7 August 2024

Lee Hye-kyeong (born 12 January 1996) is a judoka who competes internationally for South Korea. She won a bronze medal in the mixed team event at the 2024 Summer Olympics.
