= Milica Nikolić (judoka) =

Serbian judoka (born 1994)

Personal information
- Born: 7 November 1994 (age 31)
- Occupation: Judoka

Sport
- Country: Serbia
- Sport: Judo
- Weight class: ‍–‍48 kg
- Club: OJK "Proleter" Zrenjanin

Achievements and titles
- Olympic Games: R16 (2020, 2024)
- World Champ.: 5th (2017)
- European Champ.: (bronze) (2018)
Medal record
Women's judo
Representing Serbia
European Championships
Bronze medal – third place	2018 Tel Aviv	‍–‍48 kg
IJF Grand Slam
Gold medal – first place	2023 Tbilisi	‍–‍48 kg
Silver medal – second place	2016 Abu Dhabi	‍–‍48 kg
Silver medal – second place	2017 Baku	‍–‍48 kg
Silver medal – second place	2017 Abu Dhabi	‍–‍48 kg
Silver medal – second place	2023 Paris	‍–‍48 kg
Silver medal – second place	2024 Baku	‍–‍48 kg
Bronze medal – third place	2016 Tyumen	‍–‍48 kg
Bronze medal – third place	2017 Paris	‍–‍48 kg
Bronze medal – third place	2018 Düsseldorf	‍–‍48 kg
Bronze medal – third place	2019 Ekaterinburg	‍–‍48 kg
Bronze medal – third place	2019 Baku	‍–‍48 kg
Bronze medal – third place	2021 Tashkent	‍–‍48 kg
Bronze medal – third place	2022 Antalya	‍–‍48 kg
Bronze medal – third place	2022 Baku	‍–‍48 kg
Bronze medal – third place	2024 Dushanbe	‍–‍48 kg
IJF Grand Prix
Gold medal – first place	2016 Zagreb	‍–‍48 kg
Silver medal – second place	2017 Zagreb	‍–‍48 kg
Silver medal – second place	2017 Tashkent	‍–‍48 kg
Silver medal – second place	2018 Tbilisi	‍–‍48 kg
Silver medal – second place	2023 Zagreb	‍–‍48 kg
Bronze medal – third place	2016 Budapest	‍–‍48 kg
Bronze medal – third place	2018 Cancún	‍–‍48 kg
Bronze medal – third place	2018 Tashkent	‍–‍48 kg
Bronze medal – third place	2019 Antalya	‍–‍48 kg
Bronze medal – third place	2021 Zagreb	‍–‍48 kg
European U23 Championships
Gold medal – first place	2015 Bratislava	‍–‍48 kg
Gold medal – first place	2016 Tel Aviv	‍–‍48 kg
Mediterranean Games
Silver medal – second place	2018 Tarragona	‍–‍48 kg
Silver medal – second place	2022 Oran	‍–‍48 kg

Profile at external databases
- IJF: 14609
- JudoInside.com: 61639
- Updated on 27 July 2024

Milica Nikolić (Serbian Cyrillic: Милица Николић; born 7 November 1994) is a Serbian former judoka.

She won European Championships bronze in Tel Aviv 2018. Nikolić competed at the 2020 Summer Olympics in the women's 48 kg event, in which she was eliminated by the two-time world champion Daria Bilodid in a tight fight in the second round.

Nikolić entered the 2024 Summer Olympics women's 48 kg division ranked #6. She progressed as far as the round of 16, where she lost to Laura Martínez by hansoku-make.

== Achievements ==
Year	Tournament	Place	Weight class
2022	Grand Slam Antalya	3rd	−48 kg
2021	Grand Prix Zagreb	3rd	−48 kg
2021	Grand Slam Tashkent	3rd	−48 kg
2019	European Games	5th	−48 kg
2019	Grand Slam Baku	3rd	−48 kg
2019	Grand Prix Antalya	3rd	−48 kg
2019	Grand Slam Ekaterinburg	3rd	−48 kg
2018	Masters Guangzhou	5th	−48 kg
2018	Grand Prix Tashkent	3rd	−48 kg
2018	Grand Prix Cancun	3rd	−48 kg
2018	Mediterranean Games	2nd	−48 kg
2018	European Championships	3rd	−48 kg
2018	Grand Prix Tbilisi	2nd	−48 kg
2018	Grand Slam Düsseldorf	3rd	−48 kg
2017	Grand Slam Abu Dhabi	2nd	−48 kg
2017	Grand Prix Tashkent	2nd	−48 kg
2017	Grand Prix Zagreb	2nd	−48 kg
2017	World Championships	5th	−48 kg
2017	Grand Slam Baku	2nd	−48 kg
2017	Grand Slam Paris	3rd	−48 kg
2016	European U23 Championships	1st	−48 kg
2016	Grand Slam Abu Dhabi	2nd	−48 kg
2016	Grand Prix Zagreb	1st	−48 kg
2016	Grand Slam Tyumen	3rd	−48 kg
2016	Grand Prix Budapest	3rd	−48 kg
2015	European U23 Championships	1st	−48 kg
