= Lin Chen-hao =

Taiwanese judoka (born 1997)

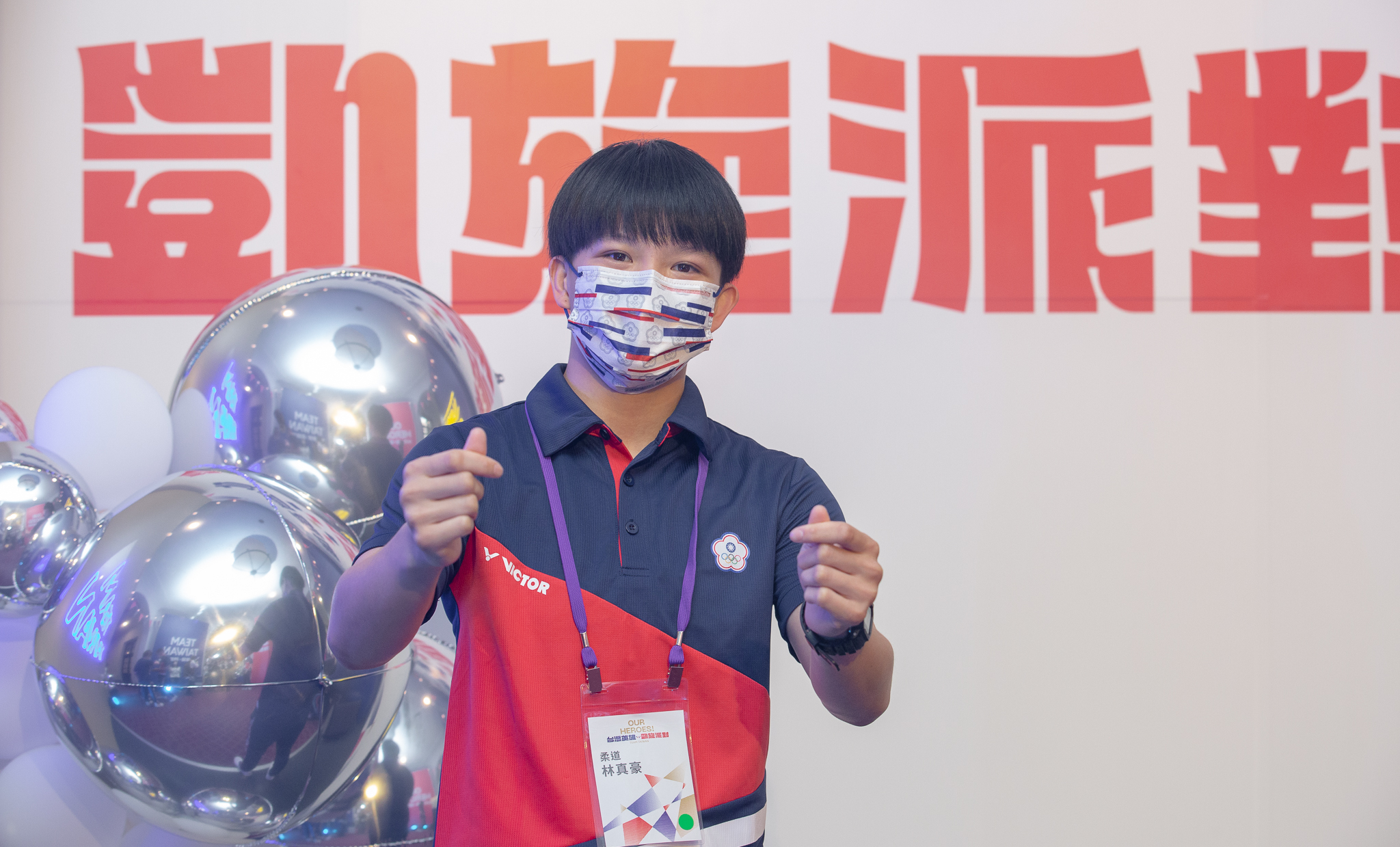

Personal information
- Born: 26 October 1997 (age 28)
- Occupation: Judoka

Sport
- Country: Taiwan
- Sport: Judo
- Weight class: ‍–‍48 kg

Achievements and titles
- Olympic Games: 7th (2020)
- World Champ.: 7th (2025)
- Asian Champ.: (bronze) (2021)
Medal record
Women's judo
Representing Chinese Taipei
Asian Championships
Bronze medal – third place	2021 Bishkek	‍–‍48 kg
IJF Grand Slam
Bronze medal – third place	2025 Tokyo	‍–‍48 kg
IJF Grand Prix
Gold medal – first place	2025 Gold Coast	‍–‍48 kg

Profile at external databases
- IJF: 16790
- JudoInside.com: 89426
- Updated on 11 December 2025

Lin Chen-hao (born 26 October 1997) is a Taiwanese judoka. She competed in the women's 48 kg event at the 2020 Summer Olympics held in Tokyo, Japan.

Lin is a bronze medalist from the 2021 Asian-Pacific Judo Championships in the ‍–‍48 kg category.

Lin competed in the women's 48 kg event at the 2023 World Judo Championships held in Doha, Qatar.
