= 2019 World Judo Championships – Women's 48 kg =

Judo competition

Judo Women's 48 kg at the 2019 World Judo Championships
- Venue: Nippon Budokan
- Location: Tokyo, Japan
- Date: 25 August
- Competitors: 45 from 39 nations
- Total prize money: 57,000$

Medalists
gold medal	Daria Bilodid (2nd title)	Ukraine
silver medal	Funa Tonaki	Japan
bronze medal	Mönkhbatyn Urantsetseg	Mongolia
bronze medal	Distria Krasniqi	Kosovo

Competition at external databases
- Links: IJF • JudoInside

The Women's 48 kg competition at the 2019 World Judo Championships was held on 25 August 2019.

== Results ==
=== Finals ===
Semi-finals
(Japan) Funa Tonaki	11
(Kosovo) Distria Krasniqi	00
(Ukraine) Daria Bilodid	10
(Mongolia) Mönkhbatyn Urantsetseg	00

Final
(Japan) Funa Tonaki	00
(Ukraine) Daria Bilodid	01

=== Repechage ===
Repechage
(France) Mélanie Clément	10
(Argentina) Paula Pareto	00

Third place
(France) Mélanie Clément	00
(Mongolia) Mönkhbatyn Urantsetseg	10

Repechage
(Spain) Laura Martínez	01
(Kazakhstan) Galbadrakhyn Otgontsetseg	00

Third place
(Spain) Laura Martínez	00
(Kosovo) Distria Krasniqi	10

=== Pool A ===
First round
(Malawi) Harriet Boniface	00
(Russia) Sabina Giliazova	10
(Hungary) Éva Csernoviczki	11
(Mauritius) Priscilla Morand	00
(Azerbaijan) Aisha Gurbanli	10
(Ukraine) Maryna Cherniak	00
(Morocco) Aziza Chakir	00
(Vietnam) Hoàng Thị Tình	10

Second round
(Japan) Funa Tonaki	10
(Russia) Sabina Giliazova	00
(South Africa) Geronay Whitebooi	00
(Hungary) Éva Csernoviczki	11
(Serbia) Milica Nikolić	10
(Azerbaijan) Aisha Gurbanli	00
(Vietnam) Hoàng Thị Tình	00
(France) Mélanie Clément	10

Third round
(Japan) Funa Tonaki	10
(Hungary) Éva Csernoviczki	00
(Serbia) Milica Nikolić	00
(France) Mélanie Clément	01

Quarterfinals
(Japan) Funa Tonaki	10
(France) Mélanie Clément	00

=== Pool B ===
First round
(Germany) Katharina Menz	10
(United States) Anne Suzuki	00
(Turkmenistan) Aziza Nazarova	10
(Venezuela) María Giménez	00
(Mongolia) Narantsetseg Ganbaatar	10
(Slovenia) Maruša Štangar	00

Second round
(Argentina) Paula Pareto	10
(Germany) Katharina Menz	00
(South Korea) Kang Yu-jeong	11
(Turkmenistan) Aziza Nazarova	00
(Kosovo) Distria Krasniqi	10
(Mongolia) Narantsetseg Ganbaatar	00
(Hong Kong) Wong Ka Lee	00
(Spain) Julia Figueroa	10

Third round
(Argentina) Paula Pareto	01
(South Korea) Kang Yu-jeong	00
(Kosovo) Distria Krasniqi	01
(Spain) Julia Figueroa	00

Quarterfinals
(Argentina) Paula Pareto	00
(Kosovo) Distria Krasniqi	01

=== Pool C ===
First round
(Portugal) Catarina Costa	10
(Azerbaijan) Leyla Aliyeva	00
(Mexico) Edna Carrillo	01
(Moldova) Cristina Blanaru	00
(Philippines) Jeanalane Lopez	00
(Spain) Laura Martínez	10

Second round
(Ukraine) Daria Bilodid	10
(Portugal) Catarina Costa	00
(Russia) Irina Dolgova	01
(Mexico) Edna Carrillo	00
(Spain) Laura Martínez	10
(China) Li Yanan	00

Third round
(Ukraine) Daria Bilodid	11
Sariuna Tsyzhipova	00
(Russia) Irina Dolgova	00
(Spain) Laura Martínez	11

Quarterfinals
(Ukraine) Daria Bilodid	10
(Spain) Laura Martínez	00

=== Pool D ===
First round
(Chinese Taipei) Lin Chen-hao	10
(Guatemala) Jacqueline Solís	00
(Romania) Monica Ungureanu	11
(Dominican Republic) Estefanía Soriano	00
(Pakistan) Humaira Ashiq	00
(Chile) Mary Dee Vargas	10

Second round
(Mongolia) Mönkhbatyn Urantsetseg	11
(Chinese Taipei) Lin Chen-hao	00
(Turkey) Gülkader Sentürk	00
(Romania) Monica Ungureanu	10
(Kazakhstan) Galbadrakhyn Otgontsetseg	01
(Israel) Shira Rishony	00
(Colombia) Luz Álvarez	01
(Chile) Mary Dee Vargas	00

Third round
(Mongolia) Mönkhbatyn Urantsetseg	11
(Romania) Monica Ungureanu	00
(Kazakhstan) Galbadrakhyn Otgontsetseg	10
(Colombia) Luz Álvarez	00

Quarterfinals
(Mongolia) Mönkhbatyn Urantsetseg	10
(Kazakhstan) Galbadrakhyn Otgontsetseg	00

== Prize money ==
The sums listed bring the total prizes awarded to 57,000$ for the individual event.

Medal	Total	Judoka	Coach
Gold	26,000$	20,800$	5,200$
Silver	15,000$	12,000$	3,000$
Bronze	8,000$	6,400$	1,600$
