= 2018 World Judo Championships – Women's 48 kg =

Judo Women's 48 kg at the 2018 World Judo Championships
- Venue: National Gymnastics Arena
- Location: Baku, Azerbaijan
- Dates: 20 September
- Competitors: 43 from 36 nations
- Total prize money: 57,000€

Medalists
gold medal	Daria Bilodid (1st title)	Ukraine
silver medal	Funa Tonaki	Japan
bronze medal	Paula Pareto	Argentina
bronze medal	Galbadrakhyn Otgontsetseg	Kazakhstan

Competition at external databases
- Links: IJF • JudoInside

The Women's 48 kg competition at the 2018 World Judo Championships was held on 20 September 2018.

== Results ==
=== Finals ===
Semi-finals
(Mongolia) Mönkhbatyn Urantsetseg	01
(Japan) Funa Tonaki	10
(Argentina) Paula Pareto	00
(Ukraine) Daria Bilodid	01

Final
(Japan) Funa Tonaki	00
(Ukraine) Daria Bilodid	10

=== Repechage ===
Repechage
(Portugal) Catarina Costa	01
(Spain) Julia Figueroa	00

Third place
(Portugal) Catarina Costa	00
(Argentina) Paula Pareto	11

Repechage
(Slovenia) Maruša Štangar	01
(Kazakhstan) Galbadrakhyn Otgontsetseg	10

Third place
(Kazakhstan) Galbadrakhyn Otgontsetseg	10
(Mongolia) Mönkhbatyn Urantsetseg	00

=== Pool A ===
First round
(New Zealand) Emma Rouse	00
(Uzbekistan) Marjona Salokhitdinova	10
(United States) Katelyn Jarrell	01
(Cuba) Melissa Hurtado	10
(Romania) Monica Ungureanu	00
(Portugal) Catarina Costa	01

Second round
(Mongolia) Mönkhbatyn Urantsetseg	10
(Uzbekistan) Marjona Salokhitdinova	00
(Morocco) Chaimae Eddinari	00
(Cuba) Melissa Hurtado	11
(Hungary) Éva Csernoviczki	10
(Russia) Sabina Giliazova	00
(Belgium) Anne-Sophie Jura	00
(Portugal) Catarina Costa	10

Third round
(Mongolia) Mönkhbatyn Urantsetseg	10
(Cuba) Melissa Hurtado	00
(Hungary) Éva Csernoviczki	00
(Portugal) Catarina Costa	10

Quarterfinals
(Mongolia) Mönkhbatyn Urantsetseg	10
(Portugal) Catarina Costa	00

=== Pool B ===
First round
(Israel) Shira Rishony	01
(Ukraine) Maryna Cherniak	00
(Turkey) Gülkader Şentürk	00
(Spain) Julia Figueroa	10

Second round
(Japan) Funa Tonaki	01
(Israel) Shira Rishony	00
(Argentina) Keisy Perafán	00
(South Korea) Kang Yu-jeong	01
(Serbia) Milica Nikolić	00
(Spain) Julia Figueroa	01
(Chile) Mary Dee Vargas	01
(Cameroon) Philomene Bata	00

Third round
(Japan) Funa Tonaki	01
(South Korea) Kang Yu-jeong	00
(Spain) Julia Figueroa	11
(Chile) Mary Dee Vargas	00

Quarterfinals
(Japan) Funa Tonaki	10
(Spain) Julia Figueroa	00

=== Pool C ===
First round
(Argentina) Paula Pareto	10
(Malawi) Harriet Boniface	00
(Netherlands) Amber Gersjes	00
(Azerbaijan) Aisha Gurbanli	10
(Burundi) Nada Kezakimana	00
(Slovenia) Maruša Štangar	10

Second round
(Russia) Irina Dolgova	00
(Argentina) Paula Pareto	10
(Australia) Caroline Hain	00
(Azerbaijan) Aisha Gurbanli	10
(France) Mélanie Clément	00
(Slovenia) Maruša Štangar	01
(United States) Anne Suzuki	00
(Israel) Noa Minsker	10

Third round
(Argentina) Paula Pareto	11
(Australia) Caroline Hain	00
(Slovenia) Maruša Štangar	01
(Israel) Noa Minsker	00

Quarterfinals
(Argentina) Paula Pareto	11
(Slovenia) Maruša Štangar	00

=== Pool D ===
First round
(Kosovo) Distria Krasniqi	10
(Guatemala) Jacqueline Solís	00
(Brazil) Gabriela Chibana	10
(South Africa) Geronay Whitebooi	00
(Spain) Laura Martínez	10
(Portugal) Joana Diogo	01

Second round
(Ukraine) Daria Bilodid	01
(Kosovo) Distria Krasniqi	00
(China) Xiong Yao	01
(Italy) Francesca Milani	00
(Kazakhstan) Galbadrakhyn Otgontsetseg	10
(Brazil) Gabriela Chibana	01
(Spain) Laura Martínez	10
(Vietnam) Hoàng Thị Tình	00

Third round
(Ukraine) Daria Bilodid	10
(China) Xiong Yao	00
(Kazakhstan) Galbadrakhyn Otgontsetseg	10
(Spain) Laura Martínez	00

Quarterfinals
(Ukraine) Daria Bilodid	10
(Kazakhstan) Galbadrakhyn Otgontsetseg	00

== Prize money ==
The sums listed bring the total prizes awarded to 57,000€ for the individual event.

Medal	Total	Judoka	Coach
Gold	26,000€	20,800€	5,200€
Silver	15,000€	12,000€	3,000€
Bronze	8,000€	6,400€	1,600€
