= 2015 World Judo Championships – Women's 48 kg =

Judo competition

Judo Women's 48 kg at the 2015 World Judo Championships
- Venue: Alau Ice Palace
- Location: Astana, Kazakhstan
- Date: 24 August
- Competitors: 40 from 34 nations
- Total prize money: 14,000$

Medalists
gold medal	Paula Pareto (1st title)	Argentina
silver medal	Haruna Asami	Japan
bronze medal	Jeong Bo-kyeong	South Korea
bronze medal	Ami Kondo	Japan

Competition at external databases
- Links: IJF • JudoInside

The Women's 48 kg competition of the 2015 World Judo Championships was held on 24 August 2015.

== Results ==
=== Finals ===
Semi-finals
(Japan) Haruna Asami	100
(Brazil) Nathalia Brigida	000
(Argentina) Paula Pareto	001
(South Korea) Jeong Bo-kyeong	000

Final
(Japan) Haruna Asami	000
(Argentina) Paula Pareto	000

=== Repechage ===
Repechage		Third place
(Ukraine) Maryna Cherniak	101
(Romania) Monica Ungureanu	000	(Ukraine) Maryna Cherniak	000
		(South Korea) Jeong Bo-kyeong	100

Repechage		Third place
(Hungary) Éva Csernoviczki	000
(Japan) Ami Kondo	100	(Japan) Ami Kondo	100
		(Brazil) Nathalia Brigida	000

=== Pool A ===
First Round
(China) Xie Shishi	100
(Uzbekistan) Nodira Gulova	001
(Mauritius) Priscilla Morand	000
(Cuba) Dayaris Mestre Álvarez	111

Second Round
(Mongolia) Mönkhbatyn Urantsetseg	101
(China) Xie Shishi	000
(Israel) Shira Rishony	000
(Japan) Haruna Asami	100
(Ukraine) Maryna Cherniak	000
(Cuba) Dayaris Mestre Álvarez	000
(Russia) Alesya Kuznetsova	000
(Kazakhstan) Alexandra Podryadova	000

Third Round
(Mongolia) Mönkhbatyn Urantsetseg	000
(Japan) Haruna Asami	000
(Ukraine) Maryna Cherniak	000
(Kazakhstan) Alexandra Podryadova	000

Quarterfinals
(Japan) Haruna Asami	102
(Ukraine) Maryna Cherniak	000

=== Pool B ===
First Round
(Brazil) Nathalia Brigida	101
(Moldova) Cristina Budescu	000
(Portugal) Leandra Freitas	001
(Italy) Valentina Moscatt	101

Second Round
(Guinea-Bissau) Taciana Lima	000
(Turkey) Dilara Lokmanhekim	000
(Brazil) Nathalia Brigida	100
(Kyrgyzstan) Anara Zhumali	000
(Romania) Monica Ungureanu	100
(Italy) Valentina Moscatt	000
(Madagascar) Asaramanitra Ratiarison	101
(Zambia) Abigail Chindele	000

Third Round
(Turkey) Dilara Lokmanhekim	000
(Brazil) Nathalia Brigida	001
(Romania) Monica Ungureanu	100
(Madagascar) Asaramanitra Ratiarison	000

Quarterfinals
(Brazil) Nathalia Brigida	010
(Romania) Monica Ungureanu	000

=== Pool C ===
First Round
(Vietnam) Văn Ngọc Tú	101
(Moldova) Tatiana Osoianu	000
(Ecuador) Diana Cobos	010
(Serbia) Milica Nikolić	000

Second Round
(Argentina) Paula Pareto	011
(Vietnam) Văn Ngọc Tú	000
(Brazil) Sarah Menezes	000
(Belgium) Charline Van Snick	001
(Hungary) Éva Csernoviczki	100
(Ecuador) Diana Cobos	000
(Romania) Violeta Dumitru	101
(Uzbekistan) Mukaddas Kubeeva	000

Third Round
(Argentina) Paula Pareto	000
(Belgium) Charline Van Snick	000
(Hungary) Éva Csernoviczki	100
(Romania) Violeta Dumitru	000

Quarterfinals
(Argentina) Paula Pareto	100
(Hungary) Éva Csernoviczki	000

=== Pool D ===
First Round
(Kyrgyzstan) Kumushai Soskeeva	000
(Russia) Irina Dolgova	100
(France) Amandine Buchard	000
(Turkey) Ebru Şahin	000

Second Round
(Japan) Ami Kondo	000
(Russia) Irina Dolgova	000
(North Korea) Kim Sol-mi	000
(Mexico) Edna Carrillo	010
(Spain) Julia Figueroa	100
(France) Amandine Buchard	010
(Kazakhstan) Galbadrakh Otgontsetseg	000
(South Korea) Jeong Bo-kyeong	001

Third Round
(Japan) Ami Kondo	000
(Mexico) Edna Carrillo	000
(Spain) Julia Figueroa	000
(South Korea) Jeong Bo-kyeong	100

Quarterfinals
(Japan) Ami Kondo	000
(South Korea) Jeong Bo-kyeong	001

== Prize money ==
The sums listed bring the total prizes awarded to 14,000$ for the individual event.

Medal	Total	Judoka	Coach
Gold	6,000$	4,800$	1,200$
Silver	4,000$	3,200$	800$
Bronze	2,000$	1,600$	400$
