= Judo at the 2015 European Games – Women's 48 kg =

Judo competition

Judo Women's 48 kg at the 2015 European Games
- Venue: Heydar Aliyev Arena
- Location: Baku, Azerbaijan
- Date: 25 June
- Competitors: 20 from 14 nations

Medalists
gold medal	Charline Van Snick (1st title)	Belgium
silver medal	Ebru Şahin	Turkey
bronze medal	Éva Csernoviczki	Hungary
bronze medal	Irina Dolgova	Russia

Competition at external databases
- Links: IJF • JudoInside

The women's 48 kg judo event at the 2015 European Games in Baku was held on 25 June at the Heydar Aliyev Arena.

== Results ==
=== Final ===
Final
Charline Van Snick (BEL)	001
Ebru Şahin (TUR)	000

=== Repechage ===
Repechage
Éva Csernoviczki (HUN)	100
Dilara Lokmanhekim (TUR)	000

Third place
Éva Csernoviczki (HUN)	100
Maryna Cherniak (UKR)	000

Repechage
Julia Figueroa (ESP)	001
Valentina Moscatt (ITA)	000

Third place
Julia Figueroa (ESP)	000
Irina Dolgova (RUS)	010

=== Top half ===
Round of 32
Violeta Dumitru (ROU)	000
Leandra Freitas (POR)	001
Kristina Vršič (SLO)	000
Leyla Aliyeva (AZE)	000

Round of 16
Éva Csernoviczki (HUN)	100
Noa Minsker (ISR)	000
Irina Dolgova (RUS)	101
Leandra Freitas (POR)	000
Dilara Lokmanhekim (TUR)	002
Ewa Konieczny (POL)	000
Charline Van Snick (BEL)	100
Leyla Aliyeva (AZE)	000

Quarterfinals
Éva Csernoviczki (HUN)	000
Irina Dolgova (RUS)	001
Dilara Lokmanhekim (TUR)	000
Charline Van Snick (BEL)	101

Semifinals
Irina Dolgova (RUS)	000
Charline Van Snick (BEL)	100

=== Bottom half ===
Round of 32
Shira Rishony (ISR)	000
Ebru Şahin (TUR)	001
Kristina Rumyantseva (RUS)	000
Aisha Gurbanli (AZE)	100

Round of 16
Monica Ungureanu (ROU)	000
Ebru Şahin (TUR)	100
Julia Figueroa (ESP)	100
Cristina Budescu (MDA)	000
Maryna Cherniak (UKR)	001
Réka Pupp (HUN)	000
Valentina Moscatt (ITA)	101
Aisha Gurbanli (AZE)	010

Quarterfinals
Ebru Şahin (TUR)	000
Julia Figueroa (ESP)	000
Maryna Cherniak (UKR)	002
Valentina Moscatt (ITA)	000

Semifinals
Ebru Şahin (TUR)	004
Maryna Cherniak (UKR)	000
