= 2016 European Judo Championships – Women's 48 kg =

Judo Women's 48 kg at the 2016 European Judo Championships
- Venue: TatNeft Arena
- Location: Kazan, Russia
- Date: 21 April
- Competitors: 23 from 16 nations

Medalists
gold medal	Charline Van Snick (2nd title)	Belgium
silver medal	Éva Csernoviczki	Hungary
bronze medal	Monica Ungureanu	Romania
bronze medal	Dilara Lokmanhekim	Turkey

Competition at external databases
- Links: IJF • JudoInside

The women's 48 kg competition at the 2016 European Judo Championships was held on 21 April at the TatNeft Arena in Kazan, Russia.

== Results ==
=== Finals ===
Semi-finals
Éva Csernoviczki (HUN)	10
Dilara Lokmanhekim (TUR)	00
Monica Ungureanu (ROU)	00
Charline Van Snick (BEL)	00

Final
Éva Csernoviczki (HUN)	00
Charline Van Snick (BEL)	01

=== Repechage ===
Repechage
Valentina Moscatt (ITA)	00
Nataliya Komova (RUS)	00

Third place
Valentina Moscatt (ITA)	00
Monica Ungureanu (ROU)	10

Repechage
Réka Pupp (HUN)	00
Nazlıcan Kılıç (TUR)	00

Third place
Réka Pupp (HUN)	00
Dilara Lokmanhekim (TUR)	00

=== Pool A ===
First round
Tatiana Osoianu (MDA)	00
Anne-Sophie Jura (BEL)	00
Joana Diogo (POR)	00
Noa Minsker (ISR)	10

Round of 16
Éva Csernoviczki (HUN)	00
Anne-Sophie Jura (BEL)	00
Valentina Moscatt (ITA)	00
Noa Minsker (ISR)	00

Quarterfinals
Éva Csernoviczki (HUN)	10
Valentina Moscatt (ITA)	00

=== Pool B ===
First round
Nataliya Komova (RUS)	10
Milica Nikolić (SRB)	00
Laëtitia Payet (FRA)	00
Violeta Dumitru (ROU)	00

Round of 16
Julia Figueroa (ESP)	00
Nataliya Komova (RUS)	10
Dilara Lokmanhekim (TUR)	00
Laëtitia Payet (FRA)	00

Quarterfinals
Nataliya Komova (RUS)	00
Dilara Lokmanhekim (TUR)	10

=== Pool C ===
First round
Kristina Vršič (SLO)	00
Olga Aladoshvili (GEO)	10
Réka Pupp (HUN)	10
Aisha Gurbanli (AZE)	01

Round of 16
Monica Ungureanu (ROU)	10
Olga Aladoshvili (GEO)	00
Shira Rishony (ISR)	00
Réka Pupp (HUN)	00

Quarterfinals
Monica Ungureanu (ROU)	00
Réka Pupp (HUN)	00

=== Pool D ===
First round
Nazlıcan Kılıç (TUR)	00
Cinta García Mesa (ESP)	00

Round of 16
Charline Van Snick (BEL)	10
Cristina Budescu (MDA)	00
Maryna Cherniak (UKR)	00
Nazlıcan Kılıç (TUR)	01

Quarterfinals
Charline Van Snick (BEL)	11
Nazlıcan Kılıç (TUR)	00
