= 2017 European Judo Championships – Women's 48 kg =

Judo competition

Judo Women's 48 kg at the 2017 European Judo Championships
- Venue: Torwar Hall
- Location: Warsaw, Poland
- Date: April 20, 2017
- Competitors: 20 from 15 nations

Medalists
gold medal	Daria Bilodid (1st title)	Ukraine
silver medal	Irina Dolgova	Russia
bronze medal	Monica Ungureanu	Romania
bronze medal	Éva Csernoviczki	Hungary

Competition at external databases
- Links: IJF • JudoInside

The women's 48 kg competition at the 2017 European Judo Championships in Warsaw was held on 20 April at the Torwar Hall.

== Results ==
=== Finals ===
Semi-finals
Daria Bilodid (UKR)	010
Éva Csernoviczki (HUN)	000
Monica Ungureanu (ROU)	000
Irina Dolgova (RUS)	100

Final
Daria Bilodid (UKR)	010
Irina Dolgova (RUS)	000

=== Repechages ===
Repechage		Bronze medal
Milica Nikolić (SRB)	000
Noa Minsker (ISR)	010	Noa Minsker (ISR)	000
		Monica Ungureanu (ROU)	000

Repechage		Bronze medal
Maryna Cherniak (UKR)	020
Shira Rishony (ISR)	000	Maryna Cherniak (UKR)	000
		Éva Csernoviczki (HUN)	010

=== Pool A ===
First round		Second round		Quarterfinals
		Milica Nikolić (SRB)	100
Maria Siderot (POR)	100	Maria Siderot (POR)	000
Alexandra Pop (ROU)	000			Milica Nikolić (SRB)	010
				Daria Bilodid (UKR)	100
		Mariia Persidskaia (RUS)	000
		Daria Bilodid (UKR)	100

=== Pool B ===
First round
Gulkader Senturk (TUR)	000
Aisha Gurbanli (AZE)	010

Second round
Noa Minsker (ISR)	010
Olga Aladoshvili (GEO)	000
Éva Csernoviczki (HUN)	130
Aisha Gurbanli (AZE)	000

Quarterfinals
Noa Minsker (ISR)	000
Éva Csernoviczki (HUN)	010

=== Pool C ===
First round		Second round		Quarterfinals
		Maryna Cherniak (UKR)	010
Joana Diogo (POR)	000	Ewa Konieczny (POL)	000
Ewa Konieczny (POL)	010			Maryna Cherniak (UKR)	000
				Monica Ungureanu (ROU)	110
		Monica Ungureanu (ROU)	110
		Cinta Garcia Mesa (ESP)	000

=== Pool D ===
First round
Francesca Milani (ITA)	000
Irina Dolgova (RUS)	100

Second round
Shira Rishony (ISR)	010
Fjolla Kelmendi (KOS)	000
Melanie Clement (FRA)	000
Irina Dolgova (RUS)	010

Quarterfinals
Shira Rishony (ISR)	000
Irina Dolgova (RUS)	010
