= 2018 European Judo Championships – Women's 48 kg =

Judo Women's 48 kg at the 2018 European Judo Championships
- Venue: Expo Tel Aviv
- Location: Tel Aviv, Israel
- Date: 26 April

Medalists
gold medal	Irina Dolgova (1st title)	Russia
silver medal	Éva Csernoviczki	Hungary
bronze medal	Milica Nikolić	Serbia
bronze medal	Maryna Cherniak	Ukraine

Competition at external databases
- Links: IJF • JudoInside

The women's 48 kg competition at the 2018 European Judo Championships was held on 26 April at the Expo Tel Aviv.

== Results ==
=== Finals ===
Semi-finals
Irina Dolgova (RUS)	01
Mélanie Clément (FRA)	00
Milica Nikolić (SRB)	00
Éva Csernoviczki (HUN)	01

Final
Irina Dolgova (RUS)	01
Éva Csernoviczki (HUN)	00

=== Repechage ===
Repechage
Anne-Sophie Jura (BEL)	01
Maruša Štangar (SLO)	00

Third place
Anne-Sophie Jura (BEL)	00
Milica Nikolić (SRB)	01

Repechage
Maryna Cherniak (UKR)	11
Dilara Lokmanhekim (TUR)	00

Third place
Maryna Cherniak (UKR)	11
Mélanie Clément (FRA)	00

=== Pool A ===
First round
Joana Diogo (POR)	00
Gülkader Şentürk (TUR)	01
Anne-Sophie Jura (BEL)	10
Amber Gersjes (NED)	00

Round of 16
Irina Dolgova (RUS)	10
Gülkader Şentürk (TUR)	00
Julia Figueroa (ESP)	00
Anne-Sophie Jura (BEL)	01

Quarterfinals
Irina Dolgova (RUS)	10
Anne-Sophie Jura (BEL)	00

=== Pool B ===
First round
Alexandra Pop (ROU)	10
Ana Budescu (MDA)	00
Leyla Aliyeva (AZE)	00
Maruša Štangar (SLO)	10

Round of 16
Mélanie Clément (FRA)	01
Alexandra Pop (ROU)	00
Shira Rishony (ISR)	00
Maruša Štangar (SLO)	10

Quarterfinals
Mélanie Clément (FRA)	01
Maruša Štangar (SLO)	00

=== Pool C ===
First round
Monica Ungureanu (ROU)	01
Cinta Garcia Mesa (ESP)	00
Catarina Costa (POR)	10
Kimberley Renicks (GBR)	00

Round of 16
Milica Nikolić (SRB)	01
Monica Ungureanu (ROU)	00
Maryna Cherniak (UKR)	10
Catarina Costa (POR)	00

Quarterfinals
Milica Nikolić (SRB)	01
Maryna Cherniak (UKR)	00

=== Pool D ===
First round
Katharina Menz (GER)	00
Francesca Milani (ITA)	01
Dilara Lokmanhekim (TUR)	10
Bazarragchaa Erdenebat (AZE)	00

Round of 16
Éva Csernoviczki (HUN)	10
Francesca Milani (ITA)	00
Noa Minsker (ISR)	00
Dilara Lokmanhekim (TUR)	10

Quarterfinals
Éva Csernoviczki (HUN)	10
Dilara Lokmanhekim (TUR)	00
