= 2017 World Judo Championships – Women's 48 kg =

Judo Women's 48 kg at the 2017 World Judo Championships
- Venue: László Papp Budapest Sports Arena
- Location: Budapest, Hungary
- Dates: 28 August
- Competitors: 35 from 28 nations
- Total prize money: 57,000$

Medalists
gold medal	Funa Tonaki (1st title)	Japan
silver medal	Mönkhbatyn Urantsetseg	Mongolia
bronze medal	Ami Kondo	Japan
bronze medal	Galbadrakhyn Otgontsetseg	Kazakhstan

Competition at external databases
- Links: IJF • JudoInside

The Women's 48 kg competition at the 2017 World Judo Championships was held on 28 August 2017.

== Results ==
=== Finals ===
Semi-finals
(Kazakhstan) Galbadrakhyn Otgontsetseg	00
(Japan) Funa Tonaki	01
(Mongolia) Mönkhbatyn Urantsetseg	10
(Japan) Ami Kondo	00

Final
(Japan) Funa Tonaki	01
(Mongolia) Mönkhbatyn Urantsetseg	00

=== Repechage ===
Repechage		Third place
(Israel) Noa Minsker	00
(Serbia) Milica Nikolić	01	(Serbia) Milica Nikolić	00
		(Japan) Ami Kondo	11

Repechage		Third place
(France) Mélanie Clément	00
(Russia) Irina Dolgova	10	(Russia) Irina Dolgova	00
		(Kazakhstan) Galbadrakhyn Otgontsetseg	10

=== Pool A ===
First Round
(Ukraine) Daria Bilodid	02
(Russia) Sabina Giliazova	00

Second Round
(Kazakhstan) Galbadrakhyn Otgontsetseg	00
(Italy) Francesca Milani	00
(Ukraine) Daria Bilodid	12
(New Zealand) Emma Rouse	00
(Israel) Noa Minsker	01
(Germany) Katharina Menz	00
(Portugal) Joana Diogo	10
(Cameroon) Philomene Bata	00

Third Round
(Kazakhstan) Galbadrakhyn Otgontsetseg	10
(Ukraine) Daria Bilodid	00
(Israel) Noa Minsker	01
(Portugal) Joana Diogo	00

Quarterfinals
(Kazakhstan) Galbadrakhyn Otgontsetseg	02
(Israel) Noa Minsker	00

=== Pool B ===
First Round

Second Round
(Serbia) Milica Nikolić	10
(Chile) Mary Dee Vargas Ley	00
(Morocco) Aziza Chakir	00
(Spain) Cinta Garcia Mesa	11
(Brazil) Stefannie Arissa Koyama	01
(Romania) Monica Ungureanu	00
(Azerbaijan) Leyla Aliyeva	00
(Japan) Funa Tonaki	10

Third Round
(Serbia) Milica Nikolić	01
(Spain) Cinta Garcia Mesa	00
(Brazil) Stefannie Arissa Koyama	01
(Japan) Funa Tonaki	02

Quarterfinals
(Serbia) Milica Nikolić	00
(Japan) Funa Tonaki	10

=== Pool C ===
First Round
(Romania) Alexandra Pop	10
(Azerbaijan) Bazarragchaa Erdenebat	01

Second Round
(Mongolia) Mönkhbatyn Urantsetseg	10
(Romania) Alexandra Pop	00
(South Korea) Kang Yu-jeong	01
(Mexico) Edna Carrillo	00
(Guinea-Bissau) Taciana Cesar	00
(France) Mélanie Clément	10
(Cuba) Melissa Hurtado Muñoz	11
(Hungary) Éva Csernoviczki	00

Third Round
(Mongolia) Mönkhbatyn Urantsetseg	11
(South Korea) Kang Yu-jeong	00
(France) Mélanie Clément	10
(Cuba) Melissa Hurtado Muñoz	00

Quarterfinals
(Mongolia) Mönkhbatyn Urantsetseg	12
(France) Mélanie Clément	00

=== Pool D ===
First Round
(Israel) Shira Rishony	02
(Vietnam) Hoàng Thị Tình	00

Second Round
(Japan) Ami Kondo	11
(United States) Katelyn Bouyssou	00
(China) Li Yanan	01
(North Korea) Jon Yu-sun	00
(Ukraine) Maryna Cherniak	00
(Israel) Shira Rishony	11
(Portugal) Maria Siderot	00
(Russia) Irina Dolgova	01

Third Round
(Japan) Ami Kondo	10
(China) Li Yanan	00
(Israel) Shira Rishony	00
(Russia) Irina Dolgova	00

Quarterfinals
(Japan) Ami Kondo	01
(Russia) Irina Dolgova	00

== Prize money ==
The sums listed bring the total prizes awarded to 57,000$ for the individual event.

Medal	Total	Judoka	Coach
Gold	26,000$	20,800$	5,200$
Silver	15,000$	12,000$	3,000$
Bronze	8,000$	6,400$	1,600$
