= Daria Bilodid =

Ukrainian judoka (born 2000)

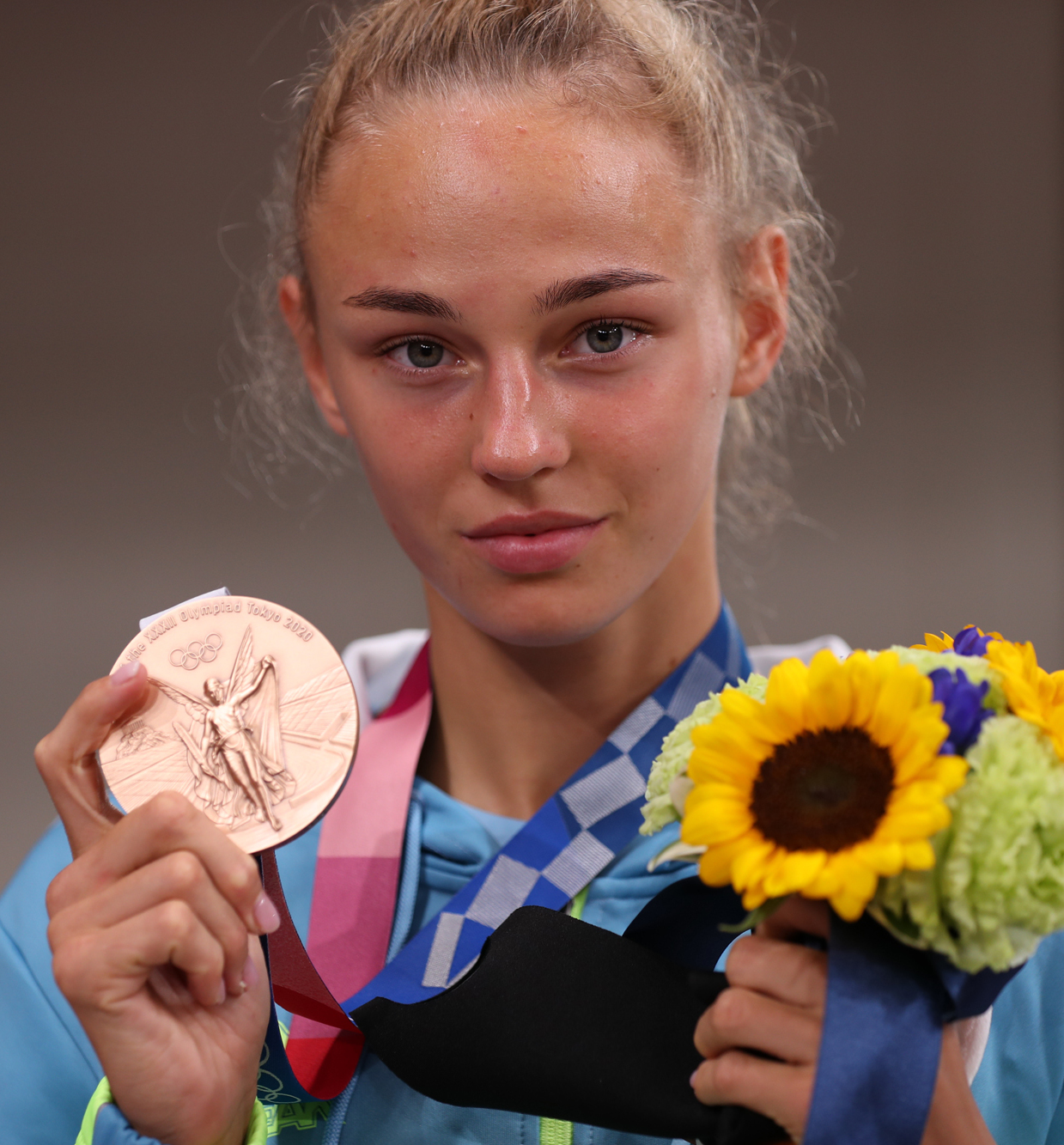
- Bilodid at the Summer Olympics in 2021

Personal information
- Full name: Daria Hennadiyivna Bilodid
- Born: 10 October 2000 (age 25) Kyiv, Ukraine
- Occupation: Judoka
- Height: 172 cm (5 ft 8 in)

Sport
- Country: Ukraine
- Sport: Judo
- Weight class: ‍–‍48 kg, ‍–‍57 kg
- Rank: 1st dan black belt
- Coached by: Gennadiy Bilodid, Svetlana Kuznetsova

Achievements and titles
- Olympic Games: (bronze) (2020)
- World Champ.: (2018, 2019)
- European Champ.: (gold) (2017, 2019, 2024)
Medal record
Women's judo
Representing Ukraine
Event	1st	2nd	3rd
Olympic Games	0	0	1
World Championships	2	0	0
European Games	1	0	0
European Championships	2	1	0
World Masters	0	0	2
IJF Grand Slam	4	1	2
IJF Grand Prix	3	1	3
World Juniors	1	0	0
European Juniors	1	0	0
World Cadets	1	0	0
Total	15	3	8
Olympic Games
Bronze medal – third place	2020 Tokyo	‍–‍48 kg
World Championships
Gold medal – first place	2018 Baku	‍–‍48 kg
Gold medal – first place	2019 Tokyo	‍–‍48 kg
European Games
Gold medal – first place	2019 Minsk	‍–‍48 kg
European Championships
Gold medal – first place	2017 Warsaw	‍–‍48 kg
Gold medal – first place	2024 Zagreb	‍–‍57 kg
Silver medal – second place	2021 Lisbon	‍–‍48 kg
World Masters
Bronze medal – third place	2021 Doha	‍–‍48 kg
Bronze medal – third place	2023 Budapest	‍–‍57 kg
IJF Grand Slam
Gold medal – first place	2018 Paris	‍–‍48 kg
Gold medal – first place	2018 Düsseldorf	‍–‍48 kg
Gold medal – first place	2019 Abu Dhabi	‍–‍48 kg
Gold medal – first place	2020 Paris	‍–‍48 kg
Silver medal – second place	2021 Tel Aviv	‍–‍48 kg
Bronze medal – third place	2020 Budapest	‍–‍52 kg
Bronze medal – third place	2023 Paris	‍–‍57 kg
Bronze medal – third place	2024 Baku	‍–‍57 kg
IJF Grand Prix
Gold medal – first place	2017 The Hague	‍–‍48 kg
Gold medal – first place	2018 Tunis	‍–‍48 kg
Gold medal – first place	2018 Zagreb	‍–‍48 kg
Silver medal – second place	2019 Tbilisi	‍–‍48 kg
Bronze medal – third place	2017 Hohhot	‍–‍48 kg
Bronze medal – third place	2023 Linz	‍–‍57 kg
Bronze medal – third place	2023 Zagreb	‍–‍57 kg
World Juniors Championships
Gold medal – first place	2018 Nassau	‍–‍48 kg
European Junior Championships
Gold medal – first place	2016 Málaga	‍–‍48 kg
World Cadets Championships
Gold medal – first place	2015 Sarajevo	‍–‍44 kg
European Cadet Championships
Gold medal – first place	2015 Sofia	‍–‍44 kg
Gold medal – first place	2016 Vantaa	‍–‍48 kg

Profile at external databases
- IJF: 18234
- JudoInside.com: 92660
- Updated on 25 April 2024

Daria Hennadiyivna Bilodid (Ukrainian: Дар'я Геннадіївна Білодід; born 10 October 2000) is a Ukrainian judoka. She is a two-time world champion (2018, 2019), a three-time European champion (2017, 2019, 2024) and won a bronze medal in the women's 48 kg event at the 2020 Summer Olympics in Tokyo. Bilodid is also a junior world champion (2018) and a junior European champion (2016).

== Career ==
Bilodid won her first senior world title at the 2018 World Championships at the age of 17, where she also became the youngest senior judo world champion in history. She defeated former opponents: the former Olympic and world bronze medalist, Otgontsetseg Galbadrakh by ippon; former Olympic champion and world champion, Paula Pareto of Argentina in the semi-finals by waza-ari; in the finals, she faced Paris Grand Slam final opponent, Funa Tonaki whom she defeated by her signature Ōuchi gari for ippon at 1:59 of the contest, winning gold at the 2018 World Championships in Baku, Azerbaijan. She is the youngest two-time world judo champion among both men and women.

Bilodid won one of the bronze medals in her event at the 2021 World Masters held in Doha, Qatar. A month later, she won the silver medal in her event at the 2021 Tel Aviv Grand Slam held in Tel Aviv, Israel.

Bilodid won her Olympic bronze at the 2020 Summer Olympics, as she beat the Israeli judoka Shira Rishony. This medal was Ukraine's first Olympic medal for women's judo.

Bilodid was at the 2024 Summer Olympics in Paris where she beat Nera Tiebwa, a teenage judoka from Kiribati.

== Personal life ==
Bilodid is the daughter of fellow judoka and two-time European champion Gennadiy Bilodid. She is in a relationship with Ukrainian businessman Artur Mkhitaryan.

== Honours ==
- Guinness World Records: Youngest female judo world champion (2018)
- European Judo Union: Best European Junior Female Judoka (2018)
- Member 3rd Class of the Order of Princess Olga (2019)
- 30 under 30: Faces of the Future by Forbes Ukraine (2020)
- IJF: Best Female Judoka of Year (2020)
- Member 2nd Class of the Order of Princess Olga (2021)

== Medal results ==
2017
(bronze) Grand Prix, Hohhot
(gold) Grand Prix, The Hague

2018
(gold) Grand Prix, Tunis
(gold) Grand Slam, Paris
(gold) Grand Slam, Düsseldorf
(gold) Grand Prix, Zagreb
(gold) Continental Cup, Podčetrtek
(gold) World Championships, Baku

2019
(gold) World Championships, Tokyo
(gold) Grand Slam, Abu Dhabi

2020
(gold) Grand Slam, Paris

2021
(bronze) Olympic Games, Tokyo
