= Stefannie Arissa Koyama =

Japanese-born Brazilian judoka

Personal information
- Nationality: Japanese, Brazilian
- Born: 30 June 1995 (age 31) Gunma, Japan
- Occupation: Judoka

Sport
- Country: Japan (2016); Brazil (2017–present)
- Sport: Judo
- Weight class: –48 kg

Achievements and titles
- World Champ.: R16 (2017)
- Pan American Champ.: (2017)
Medal record
Women's judo
Representing Japan
East Asian Championships
Gold medal – first place	2016 Hong Kong	–48 kg
All-Japan Championships
Bronze medal – third place	2016 Fukuoka	–48 kg
Representing Brazil
Pan American Championships
Bronze medal – third place	2017 Panama City	–48 kg
IJF Grand Slam
Gold medal – first place	2017 Baku	–48 kg
IJF Grand Prix
Gold medal – first place	2017 Tbilisi	–48 kg

Profile at external databases
- IJF: 36664
- JudoInside.com: 105513
- Updated on 25 November 2022

Stefannie Arissa Koyama (born 30 June 1995) is a Japanese-born Brazilian judoka. Koyama had won bronze at the All-Japan Judo Championships at Fukuoka in 2016, followed by the East Asian title at 2016 East Asian Judo Championships at Hong Kong. While representing Japan, Koyama's teamed with Funa Tonaki at Teikyo University but later switched to Brazil in 2017.

She is the gold medallist of the 2017 Judo Grand Prix Tbilisi and the 2017 Judo Grand Slam Baku in the -48 kg category.
