= Judo at the 2020 Summer Olympics – Women's 48 kg =

Judo competition

Women's 48 kg at the Games of the XXXII Olympiad
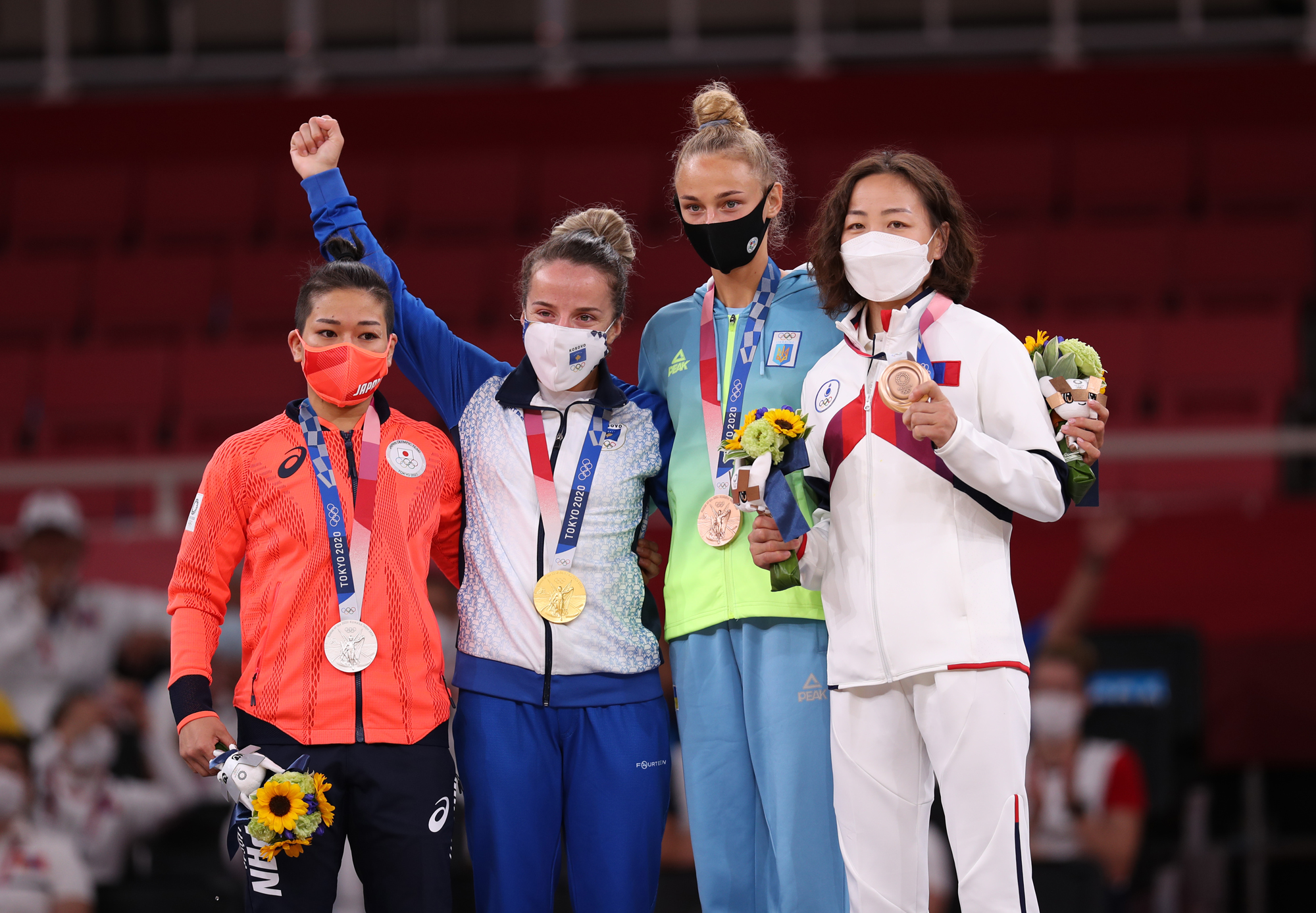
- The medalists
- Venue: Nippon Budokan
- Date: 24 July 2021
- Competitors: 28 from 28 nations

Medalists
1st place, gold medalist(s)		Distria Krasniqi	Kosovo
2nd place, silver medalist(s)		Funa Tonaki	Japan
3rd place, bronze medalist(s)		Daria Bilodid	Ukraine
3rd place, bronze medalist(s)		Urantsetseg Munkhbat	Mongolia

The women's 48 kg competition in judo at the 2020 Summer Olympics was held on 24 July 2021 at the Nippon Budokan in Tokyo, Japan.

== Results ==
=== Finals ===
Semi-finals
1 Distria Krasniqi (KOS)	01
4 Urantsetseg Munkhbat (MGL)	00
2 Daria Bilodid (UKR)	00
3 Funa Tonaki (JPN)	10

Gold medal
1 Distria Krasniqi (KOS)	01
3 Funa Tonaki (JPN)	00

=== Repechage ===
Repechage
Lin Chen-hao (TPE)	00
Shira Rishony (ISR)	10

Bronze medal
2 Daria Bilodid (UKR)	10
Shira Rishony (ISR)	00

Repechage
7 Catarina Costa (POR)	01
6 Paula Pareto (ARG)	00

Bronze medal
4 Urantsetseg Munkhbat (MGL)	10
7 Catarina Costa (POR)	00

=== Pool A ===
Round of 32
Gabriela Chibana (BRA)	10
Harriet Boniface (MAW)	00
8 Irina Dolgova (ROC)	10
Soniya Bhatta (NEP)	00
Francesca Milani (ITA)	01
Lin Chen-hao (TPE)	10

Round of 16
1 Distria Krasniqi (KOS)	10
Gabriela Chibana (BRA)	00
8 Irina Dolgova (ROC)	00
Lin Chen-hao (TPE)	01

Quarter-finals
1 Distria Krasniqi (KOS)	10
Lin Chen-hao (TPE)	00

=== Pool B ===
Round of 32
Katharina Menz (GER)	00
Mary Dee Vargas (CHI)	01
5 Julia Figueroa (ESP)	10
Gülkader Şentürk (TUR)	00
Shira Rishony (ISR)	10
Luz Álvarez (COL)	00

Round of 16
4 Urantsetseg Munkhbat (MGL)	10
Mary Dee Vargas (CHI)	00
5 Julia Figueroa (ESP)	00
Shira Rishony (ISR)	10

Quarter-finals
4 Urantsetseg Munkhbat (MGL)	11
Shira Rishony (ISR)	00

=== Pool C ===
Round of 32
Shirine Boukli (FRA)	00
Milica Nikolić (SRB)	10
7 Catarina Costa (POR)	01
Aisha Gurbanli (AZE)	00
Galbadrakhyn Otgontsetseg (KAZ)	00
Li Yanan (CHN)	10

Round of 16
2 Daria Bilodid (UKR)	01
Milica Nikolić (SRB)	00
7 Catarina Costa (POR)	10
Li Yanan (CHN)	00

Quarter-finals
2 Daria Bilodid (UKR)	10
7 Catarina Costa (POR)	00

=== Pool D ===
Round of 32
Shushila Devi Likmabam (IND)	00
Éva Csernoviczki (HUN)	10
6 Paula Pareto (ARG)	10
Geronay Whitebooi (RSA)	00
Kang Yu-jeong (KOR)	01
Maruša Štangar (SLO)	10

Round of 16
3 Funa Tonaki (JPN)	10
Éva Csernoviczki (HUN)	00
6 Paula Pareto (ARG)	10
Maruša Štangar (SLO)	00

Quarter-finals
3 Funa Tonaki (JPN)	10
6 Paula Pareto (ARG)	00
