= Kang Yu-jeong =

South Korean judoka (born 1996)

Personal information
- Born: 2 August 1996 (age 29)
- Occupation: Judoka

Korean name
- Hangul: 강유정
- RR: Gang Yujeong
- MR: Kang Yujŏng

Sport
- Country: South Korea
- Sport: Judo
- Weight class: ‍–‍48 kg

Achievements and titles
- Olympic Games: R32 (2020)
- World Champ.: R16 (2017, 2018, 2019)
- Asian Champ.: (bronze) (2015, 2017)
Medal record
Women's judo
Representing South Korea
Asian Championships
Bronze medal – third place	2015 Kuwait City	‍–‍48 kg
Bronze medal – third place	2017 Hong Kong	‍–‍48 kg
IJF Grand Slam
Silver medal – second place	2018 Paris	‍–‍48 kg
Silver medal – second place	2019 Düsseldorf	‍–‍48 kg
IJF Grand Prix
Gold medal – first place	2017 Hohhot	‍–‍48 kg
Silver medal – second place	2015 Ulaanbaatar	‍–‍48 kg
Silver medal – second place	2018 Hohhot	‍–‍48 kg
Bronze medal – third place	2019 Antalya	‍–‍48 kg
Asian Cadet Championships
Gold medal – first place	2013 Hainan	‍–‍48 kg

Profile at external databases
- IJF: 17782
- JudoInside.com: 47887
- Updated on 26 November 2022

Kang Yu-jeong (born 2 August 1996) is a South Korean judoka. She represented South Korea at the 2020 Summer Olympics in Tokyo, Japan. She competed in the women's 48 kg event.

As a first-year student at Museon Middle School in Yeosu, Kang won a gold medal in the 42 kg category at the 38th National Junior Sports Festival in 2009. She subsequently attended Yeosu Information Science High School. As of 2019, she represented the Suncheon City Hall team in domestic competition. She is the silver medallist of the 2018 Judo Grand Slam Paris in the ‍–‍48 kg category.

In 2021, she competed in the women's 48 kg event at the 2021 World Judo Championships held in Budapest, Hungary.
