= 2013 Judo Grand Prix Ulaanbaatar =

Judo competition in Ulaanbaatar, Mongolia

Judo 2013 Judo Grand Prix Ulaanbaatar
- Location: Ulaanbaatar, Mongolia
- Dates: 13–14 July 2013
- Competitors: 144 from 18 nations

Competition at external databases
- Links: IJF • JudoInside

The 2013 Judo Grand Prix Ulaanbaatar was held in Ulaanbaatar, Mongolia from 13 to 14 July 2013.

== Medal summary ==
=== Men's events ===
Event	Gold	Silver	Bronze
Extra-lightweight (−60 kg)	Ganbatyn Boldbaatar (MGL)	Dashdavaagiin Amartüvshin (MGL)	Ganboldyn Kherlen (MGL)
Extra-lightweight (−60 kg)	Ganbatyn Boldbaatar (MGL)	Dashdavaagiin Amartüvshin (MGL)	Ryoya Kawano (JPN)
Half-lightweight (−66 kg)	Sanjaasürengiin Miyaaragchaa (MGL)	Cho Jun-ho (KOR)	Davaadorjiin Tömörkhüleg (MGL)
Half-lightweight (−66 kg)	Sanjaasürengiin Miyaaragchaa (MGL)	Cho Jun-ho (KOR)	Golan Pollack (ISR)
Lightweight (−73 kg)	Sainjargalyn Nyam-Ochir (MGL)	Khashbaataryn Tsagaanbaatar (MGL)	Kim Joo-jin (KOR)
Lightweight (−73 kg)	Sainjargalyn Nyam-Ochir (MGL)	Khashbaataryn Tsagaanbaatar (MGL)	Victor Scvortov (UAE)
Half-middleweight (−81 kg)	Sergiu Toma (UAE)	Otgonbaataryn Uuganbaatar (MGL)	Lee Hui-jung (KOR)
Half-middleweight (−81 kg)	Sergiu Toma (UAE)	Otgonbaataryn Uuganbaatar (MGL)	Jaromír Musil (CZE)
Middleweight (−90 kg)	Alexander Grigorev (RUS)	Vitalii Kovtunov (UKR)	Rinat Ibragimov (KAZ)
Middleweight (−90 kg)	Alexander Grigorev (RUS)	Vitalii Kovtunov (UKR)	Lkhagvasürengiin Otgonbaatar (MGL)
Half-heavyweight (−100 kg)	Michal Horák (CZE)	Gedelefu Wu (CHN)	Kim Kyeong-tae (KOR)
Half-heavyweight (−100 kg)	Michal Horák (CZE)	Gedelefu Wu (CHN)	Or Sasson (ISR)
Heavyweight (+100 kg)	Kim Soo-whan (KOR)	Ryota Uesugi (JPN)	Sugarjargal Boldpurev (MGL)
Heavyweight (+100 kg)	Kim Soo-whan (KOR)	Ryota Uesugi (JPN)	Ölziibayaryn Düürenbayar (MGL)

=== Women's events ===
Event	Gold	Silver	Bronze
Extra-lightweight (−48 kg)	Mönkhbatyn Urantsetseg (MGL)	Otgontsetseg Galbadrakh (MGL)	Lee Se-young (KOR)
Extra-lightweight (−48 kg)	Mönkhbatyn Urantsetseg (MGL)	Otgontsetseg Galbadrakh (MGL)	Dolgorjav Magsarjav (MGL)
Half-lightweight (−52 kg)	Park Da-sol (KOR)	Adiyaasambuugiin Tsolmon (MGL)	Baljinnyamyn Bat-Erdene (MGL)
Half-lightweight (−52 kg)	Park Da-sol (KOR)	Adiyaasambuugiin Tsolmon (MGL)	Azzaya Chintogtokh (MGL)
Lightweight (−57 kg)	Dorjsürengiin Sumiyaa (MGL)	Kim Jan-di (KOR)	Altaiin Batzul (MGL)
Lightweight (−57 kg)	Dorjsürengiin Sumiyaa (MGL)	Kim Jan-di (KOR)	Narantuya Bazarragchaa (MGL)
Half-middleweight (−63 kg)	Tsend-Ayuushiin Tserennadmid (MGL)	You Je-young (KOR)	Baldorjyn Möngönchimeg (MGL)
Half-middleweight (−63 kg)	Tsend-Ayuushiin Tserennadmid (MGL)	You Je-young (KOR)	Hannah Martin (USA)
Middleweight (−70 kg)	Kim Seong-yeon (KOR)	Naranjargal Tsend-Ayush (MGL)	Yoko Ono (JPN)
Middleweight (−70 kg)	Kim Seong-yeon (KOR)	Naranjargal Tsend-Ayush (MGL)	Juliane Robra (SUI)
Half-heavyweight (−78 kg)	Battulgyn Mönkhtuyaa (MGL)	Misaki Hidaka (JPN)	Jung Da-woon (KOR)
Half-heavyweight (−78 kg)	Battulgyn Mönkhtuyaa (MGL)	Misaki Hidaka (JPN)	Baasanjav Turbat (MGL)
Heavyweight (+78 kg)	Kim Na-young (KOR)	Odkhüügiin Javzmaa (MGL)	Giovanna Blanco (VEN)
Heavyweight (+78 kg)	Kim Na-young (KOR)	Odkhüügiin Javzmaa (MGL)	Suzuka Ichihashi (JPN)

Source Results

=== Medal table ===
* Host nation (Mongolia)

Rank	Nation	Gold	Silver	Bronze	Total
1	Mongolia (MGL)*	7	7	12	26
2	South Korea (KOR)	4	3	5	12
3	Czech Republic (CZE)	1	0	1	2
3	United Arab Emirates (UAE)	1	0	1	2
5	Russia (RUS)	1	0	0	1
6	Japan (JPN)	0	2	3	5
7	China (CHN)	0	1	0	1
7	Ukraine (UKR)	0	1	0	1
9	Israel (ISR)	0	0	2	2
10	Kazakhstan (KAZ)	0	0	1	1
10	Switzerland (SUI)	0	0	1	1
10	United States (USA)	0	0	1	1
10	Venezuela (VEN)	0	0	1	1
Totals (13 entries)		14	14	28	56
