= Naeko Maeda =

Japanese judoka (born 1991)

Personal information
- Nationality: Japanese
- Born: 12 July 1991 (age 34)
- Occupation: Judoka

Sport
- Country: Japan
- Sport: Judo
- Weight class: ‍–‍70 kg
Medal record
Women's judo
Representing Japan
IJF Grand Slam
Bronze medal – third place	2016 Tokyo	‍–‍70 kg
IJF Grand Prix
Gold medal – first place	2017 Hohhot	‍–‍70 kg

Profile at external databases
- IJF: 8821
- JudoInside.com: 62472
- Updated on 25 November 2022

Naeko Maeda (born 12 July 1991) is a Japanese judoka.

Maeda is the gold medalist of the 2017 Judo Grand Prix Hohhot in the ‍–‍70 kg category.
