= Alexander Grigorev =

Russian judoka (born 1989)

Personal information
- Born: 10 November 1989 (age 36)
- Occupation: Judoka

Sport
- Country: Russia
- Sport: Judo
- Weight class: ‍–‍90 kg
Medal record
Men's judo
Representing Russia
IJF Grand Prix
Gold medal – first place	2013 Ulaanbaatar	‍–‍90 kg
Gold medal – first place	2016 Zagreb	‍–‍90 kg

Profile at external databases
- IJF: 2347
- JudoInside.com: 49305
- Updated on 15 December 2021

Alexander Grigorev or Aleksandr Grigoryev (born 10 November 1989) is a Russian judoka.

Grigorev is the gold medalist of the 2016 Judo Grand Prix Zagreb in the ‍–‍90 kg category.
