= Ami Kondo =

Japanese judoka (born 1995)

Personal information
- Nationality: Japanese
- Born: 9 May 1995 (age 31)
- Occupation: Judoka

Sport
- Country: Japan
- Sport: Judo
- Weight class: –48 kg

Achievements and titles
- Olympic Games: (bronze) (2016)
- World Champ.: (2014)
- Asian Champ.: (silver) (2018)
Medal record
Women's judo
Representing Japan
Olympic Games
Bronze medal – third place	2016 Rio de Janeiro	‍–‍48 kg
World Championships
Gold medal – first place	2014 Chelyabinsk	‍–‍48 kg
Bronze medal – third place	2015 Astana	‍–‍48 kg
Bronze medal – third place	2017 Budapest	‍–‍48 kg
Asian Games
Silver medal – second place	2018 Jakarta	‍–‍48 kg
World Masters
Gold medal – first place	2016 Guadalajara	‍–‍48 kg
Silver medal – second place	2018 Guangzhou	‍–‍48 kg
IJF Grand Slam
Gold medal – first place	2013 Tokyo	‍–‍48 kg
Gold medal – first place	2014 Tokyo	‍–‍48 kg
Gold medal – first place	2015 Tokyo	‍–‍48 kg
Gold medal – first place	2017 Ekaterinburg	‍–‍48 kg
Gold medal – first place	2017 Tokyo	‍–‍48 kg
Gold medal – first place	2019 Paris	‍–‍48 kg
Bronze medal – third place	2016 Tokyo	‍–‍48 kg
Bronze medal – third place	2017 Paris	‍–‍48 kg
Bronze medal – third place	2018 Osaka	‍–‍48 kg
IJF Grand Prix
Gold medal – first place	2018 Hohhot	‍–‍48 kg
Bronze medal – third place	2014 Düsseldorf	‍–‍48 kg
Bronze medal – third place	2014 Budapest	‍–‍48 kg
World Juniors Championships
Gold medal – first place	2014 Fort Lauderdale	‍–‍48 kg
World Cadets Championships
Gold medal – first place	2011 Kyiv	‍–‍48 kg

Profile at external databases
- IJF: 7355
- JudoInside.com: 76624
- Updated on 24 May 2023

Ami Kondo (近藤 亜美, Kondo Ami; born 9 May 1995 in Nagoya) is a former Japanese judoka.

== Career ==
The daughter of a Sumo practitioner, Kondo started Judo at the age of 5. Her favorite technique is Harai goshi.

In 2011, she won the gold medal in the -48 kg weight class at the World Judo Championships Cadet. In 2013, she won the gold medal in the -48 kg weight class at the Grand Slam Tokyo by defeating olympic champion Sarah Menezes and world champion Mönkhbatyn Urantsetseg. In 2014, she belonged to Mitsui Sumitomo Insurance Group after graduating from Taisei High School. She won the gold medal in the Extra-lightweight (48 kg) division at the 2014 World Judo Championships at the age of 19.
