= Xiong Yao =

Chinese judoka (born 1991)

Personal information
- Born: 24 October 1991 (age 34)
- Occupation: Judoka

Sport
- Country: China
- Sport: Judo
- Weight class: ‍–‍48 kg

Achievements and titles
- World Champ.: R16 (2018)
- Asian Champ.: 5th (2018)
Medal record
Women's judo
Representing China
IJF Grand Prix
Silver medal – second place	2018 The Hague	‍–‍48 kg
Silver medal – second place	2019 Hohhot	‍–‍48 kg

Profile at external databases
- IJF: 17704
- JudoInside.com: 93519
- Updated on 29 November 2022

Xiong Yao (born 24 October 1991) is a Chinese judoka.

Xiong is the silver medalist of the 2018 Judo Grand Prix The Hague in the ‍–‍48 kg category.
