= Mariia Persidskaia =

Russian judoka (born 1991)

Personal information
- Native name: Мария Сергеевна Персидская
- Born: 28 December 1991 (age 34)
- Occupation: Judoka

Sport
- Country: Russia
- Sport: Judo
- Weight class: ‍–‍48 kg

Achievements and titles
- European Champ.: R16 (2017)
Medal record
Women's judo
Representing Russia
IJF Grand Prix
| Gold medal – first place | 2016 Tashkent | ‍–‍48 kg |
| Silver medal – second place | 2016 Qingdao | ‍–‍48 kg |
| Bronze medal – third place | 2017 Tbilisi | ‍–‍48 kg |
| Bronze medal – third place | 2017 Tashkent | ‍–‍48 kg |
European U23 Championships
| Bronze medal – third place | 2013 Samokov | ‍–‍48 kg |

Profile at external databases
- IJF: 7216
- JudoInside.com: 51704
- Updated on 6 December 2022

Mariia Persidskaia (born 28 December 1991) is a Russian judoka.

Persidskaia is a bronze medalist from the 2017 Judo Grand Prix Tbilisi in the ‍–‍48 kg category.
