= Judo at the 2016 Summer Olympics – Women's 48 kg =

Women's 48 kg at the Games of the XXXI Olympiad
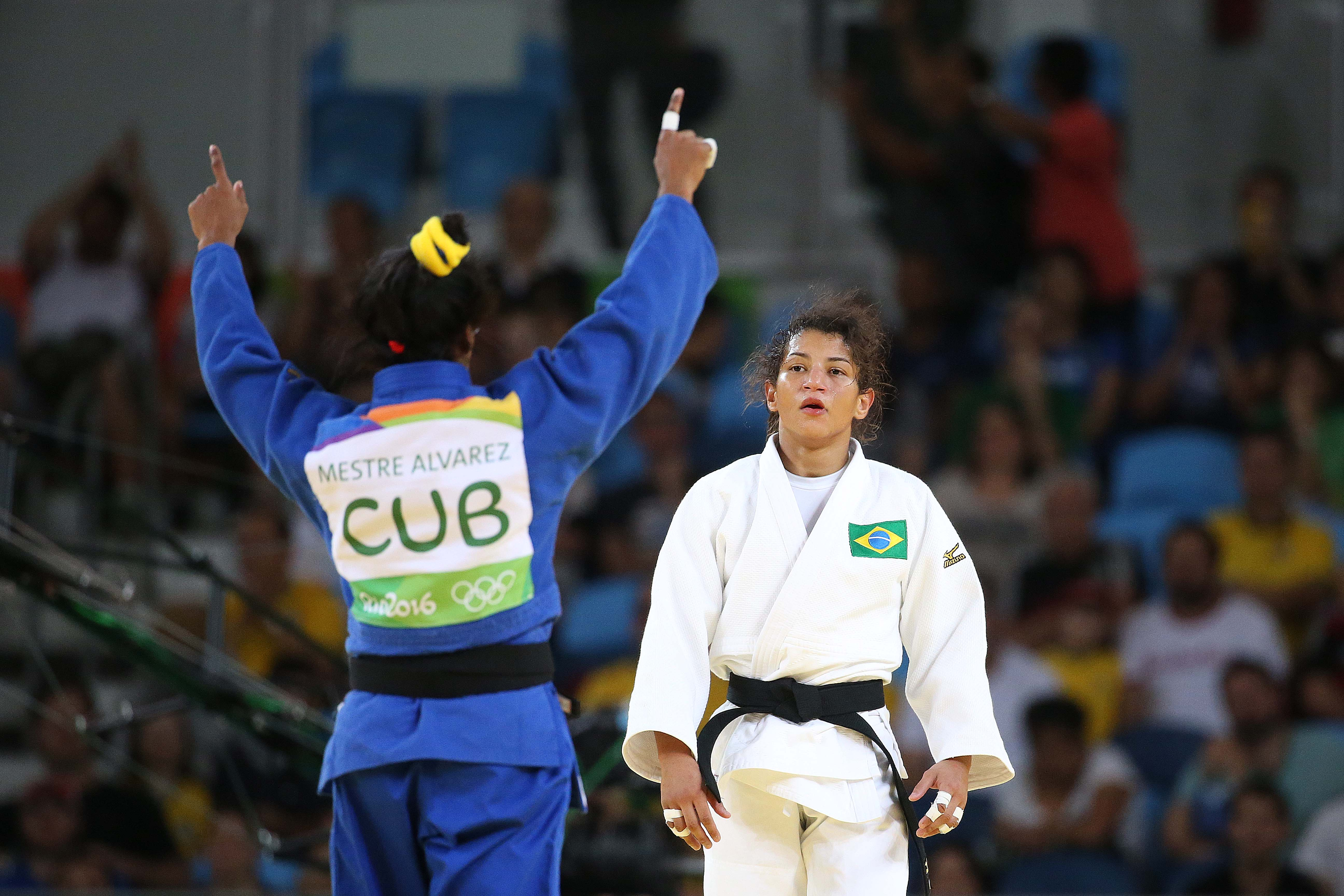
- Brazil's Sarah Menezes faces Cuba's Dayaris Mestre in Pool B's Quarterfinal.
- Venue: Carioca Arena 2
- Date: 6 August 2016
- Competitors: 23 from 23 nations

Medalists
1st place, gold medalist(s)		Paula Pareto	Argentina
2nd place, silver medalist(s)		Jeong Bo-kyeong	South Korea
3rd place, bronze medalist(s)		Ami Kondo	Japan
3rd place, bronze medalist(s)		Galbadrakhyn Otgontsetseg	Kazakhstan

The women's 48 kg competition in judo at the 2016 Summer Olympics in Rio de Janeiro was held on 6 August at the Carioca Arena 2.

The gold and silver medals were determined by a single-elimination tournament, with the winner of the final taking gold and the loser receiving silver. Judo events awarded two bronze medals. Quarterfinal losers competed in a repechage match for the right to face a semifinal loser for a bronze medal (that is, the judokas defeated in quarterfinals A and B competed against each other, with the winner of that match facing the semifinal loser from the other half of the bracket).

The medals for the competition were presented by Yumilka Ruiz, Cuba, member of the International Olympic Committee and the gifts were presented by Marius Vizer, president of the International Judo Federation.

== Results ==
=== Finals ===
Semifinals
1	Jeong Bo-kyeong (KOR)	100
4	Dayaris Mestre (CUB)	000
3	Paula Pareto (ARG)	010
2	Ami Kondo (JPN)	000

Finals
Jeong Bo-kyeong (KOR)	000
Paula Pareto (ARG)	010

=== Repechages ===
Repechage		Bronze medal
Mönkhbatyn Urantsetseg (MGL)	100
Sarah Menezes (BRA)	000	Mönkhbatyn Urantsetseg (MGL)	000
		Ami Kondo (JPN)	001

Repechage		Bronze medal
Éva Csernoviczki (HUN)	000
Galbadrakhyn Otgontsetseg (KAZ)	100	Galbadrakhyn Otgontsetseg (KAZ)	100
		Dayaris Mestre (CUB)	000

=== Pool A ===
First round
Chloe Rayner (AUS)	000
Laëtitia Payet (FRA)	101
Valentina Moscatt (ITA)	000
Văn Ngọc Tú (VIE)	000

Second round
Mönkhbatyn Urantsetseg (MGL)	100
Laëtitia Payet (FRA)	000
Jeong Bo-kyeong (KOR)	102
Văn Ngọc Tú (VIE)	000

Quarterfinals
Mönkhbatyn Urantsetseg (MGL)	000
Jeong Bo-kyeong (KOR)	100

=== Pool B ===
First round
Monica Ungureanu (ROU)	000
Charline Van Snick (BEL)	100
Asaramanitra Ratiarison (MAD)	000
Dayaris Mestre (CUB)	000

Second round
Sarah Menezes (BRA)	001
Charline Van Snick (BEL)	000
Julia Figueroa (ESP)	000
Dayaris Mestre (CUB)	011

Quarterfinals
Sarah Menezes (BRA)	000
Dayaris Mestre (CUB)	000

=== Pool C ===
First round
Irina Dolgova (RUS)	010
Kim Sol-mi (PRK)	000
Maryna Cherniak (UKR)	100
Shira Rishony (ISR)	000

Second round
Paula Pareto (ARG)	102
Irina Dolgova (RUS)	000
Éva Csernoviczki (HUN)	003
Maryna Cherniak (UKR)	000

Quarterfinals
Paula Pareto (ARG)	010
Éva Csernoviczki (HUN)	000

=== Pool D ===
First round		Second round		Quarterfinals
		Ami Kondo (JPN)	101
Edna Carrillo (MEX)	100	Edna Carrillo (MEX)	000
Dilara Lokmanhekim (TUR)	000			Ami Kondo (JPN)	100
				Galbadrakhyn Otgontsetseg (KAZ)	010
		Galbadrakhyn Otgontsetseg (KAZ)	010
		Taciana Lima (GBS)	010
