= Judo at the 2018 Asian Games – Women's 48 kg =

Judo competition

Women's 48 kg at the 2018 Asian Games
- Venue: Jakarta Convention Center
- Date: 29 August 2018
- Competitors: 13 from 13 nations

Medalists
| gold medal | Jeong Bo-kyeong | South Korea |
| silver medal | Ami Kondo | Japan |
| bronze medal | Galbadrakhyn Otgontsetseg | Kazakhstan |
| bronze medal | Mönkhbatyn Urantsetseg | Mongolia |

The women's 48 kilograms (Extra lightweight) competition at the 2018 Asian Games in Jakarta was held on 29 August at the Jakarta Convention Center Assembly Hall.

Jeong Bo-kyeong of South Korea won the gold medal.

== Schedule ==
All times are Western Indonesia Time (UTC+07:00)

| Date | Time | Event |
|---|---|---|
| Wednesday, 29 August 2018 | 09:00 | Elimination round of 16 |
| Wednesday, 29 August 2018 | 09:00 | Quarterfinals |
| Wednesday, 29 August 2018 | 09:00 | Repechage |
| Wednesday, 29 August 2018 | 09:00 | Semifinals |
| Wednesday, 29 August 2018 | 16:00 | Finals |

== Results ==
=== Main bracket ===
Elimination round of 16
Dewi Sinta (INA) | 01
Gao Jun-ying (TPE) | 10
Jeong Bo-kyeong (KOR) | 11
Hoàng Thị Tình (VIE) | 00
Xiong Yao (CHN) | 10
Wong Ka Lei (MAC) | 00
Jon Yu-sun (PRK) | 10
Akari Warasiha (THA) | 01
Diyora Keldiyorova (UZB) | 11
Viengxay Vilayphone (LAO) | 00

Quarterfinals
Mönkhbatyn Urantsetseg (MGL) | 10
Gao Jun-ying (TPE) | 00
Jeong Bo-kyeong (KOR) | 10
Xiong Yao (CHN) | 00
Galbadrakhyn Otgontsetseg (KAZ) | 01
Jon Yu-sun (PRK) | 00
Ami Kondo (JPN) | 10
Diyora Keldiyorova (UZB) | 00

Semifinals
Mönkhbatyn Urantsetseg (MGL) | 00
Jeong Bo-kyeong (KOR) | 01
Galbadrakhyn Otgontsetseg (KAZ) | 00
Ami Kondo (JPN) | 10

Gold medal contest
Jeong Bo-kyeong (KOR) | 01
Ami Kondo (JPN) | 00

=== Repechage ===
Repechage
Gao Jun-ying (TPE) | 00
Xiong Yao (CHN) | 10
Jon Yu-sun (PRK) | 10
Diyora Keldiyorova (UZB) | 00

Bronze medal contests
Xiong Yao (CHN) | 00
Galbadrakhyn Otgontsetseg (KAZ) | 10
Jon Yu-sun (PRK) | 01
Mönkhbatyn Urantsetseg (MGL) | 10
