= 2017 Judo Grand Prix Hohhot =

Judo competition

Judo 2017 Judo Grand Prix Hohhot
- Venue: Inner Mongolia Stadium
- Location: Hohhot, China
- Dates: 30 June – 2 July 2017
- Competitors: 223 from 26 nations

Competition at external databases
- Links: IJF • EJU • JudoInside

The 2017 Judo Grand Prix Hohhot was held at the Inner Mongolia Stadium in Hohhot, China, from 30 June to 2 July 2017.

== Medal summary ==
=== Men's events ===
Event	Gold	Silver	Bronze
Extra-lightweight (−60 kg)	Toru Shishime (JPN)	Dashdavaagiin Amartüvshin (MGL)	Robert Mshvidobadze (RUS)
Extra-lightweight (−60 kg)	Toru Shishime (JPN)	Dashdavaagiin Amartüvshin (MGL)	Ganbatyn Boldbaatar (MGL)
Half-lightweight (−66 kg)	Yakub Shamilov (RUS)	Georgii Zantaraia (UKR)	Yuuki Hashiguchi (JPN)
Half-lightweight (−66 kg)	Yakub Shamilov (RUS)	Georgii Zantaraia (UKR)	Yondonperenlein Baskhüü (MGL)
Lightweight (−73 kg)	Sai Yinjirigala (CHN)	Arthur Margelidon (CAN)	Denis Iartsev (RUS)
Lightweight (−73 kg)	Sai Yinjirigala (CHN)	Arthur Margelidon (CAN)	Mohammad Mohammadi (IRI)
Half-middleweight (−81 kg)	Antoine Valois-Fortier (CAN)	Alan Khubetsov (RUS)	László Csoknyai (HUN)
Half-middleweight (−81 kg)	Antoine Valois-Fortier (CAN)	Alan Khubetsov (RUS)	Aslan Lappinagov (RUS)
Middleweight (−90 kg)	Khusen Khalmurzaev (RUS)	Aleksandar Kukolj (SRB)	Gantulgyn Altanbagana (MGL)
Middleweight (−90 kg)	Khusen Khalmurzaev (RUS)	Aleksandar Kukolj (SRB)	Magomed Magomedov (RUS)
Half-heavyweight (−100 kg)	Ryunosuke Haga (JPN)	Kirill Denisov (RUS)	Joakim Dvärby (SWE)
Half-heavyweight (−100 kg)	Ryunosuke Haga (JPN)	Kirill Denisov (RUS)	Kazbek Zankishiev (RUS)
Heavyweight (+100 kg)	Lukáš Krpálek (CZE)	Ölziibayaryn Düürenbayar (MGL)	Kim Sung-min (KOR)
Heavyweight (+100 kg)	Lukáš Krpálek (CZE)	Ölziibayaryn Düürenbayar (MGL)	Andrey Volkov (RUS)

=== Women's events ===
Event	Gold	Silver	Bronze
Extra-lightweight (−48 kg)	Kang Yu-jeong (KOR)	Irina Dolgova (RUS)	Yahong Jiang (CHN)
Extra-lightweight (−48 kg)	Kang Yu-jeong (KOR)	Irina Dolgova (RUS)	Daria Bilodid (UKR)
Half-lightweight (−52 kg)	Rim Song-sim (PRK)	Ecaterina Guica (CAN)	Wang Xin (CHN)
Half-lightweight (−52 kg)	Rim Song-sim (PRK)	Ecaterina Guica (CAN)	Mönkhbatyn Urantsetseg (MGL)
Lightweight (−57 kg)	Momo Tamaoki (JPN)	Dorjsürengiin Sumiyaa (MGL)	Viola Wächter (GER)
Lightweight (−57 kg)	Momo Tamaoki (JPN)	Dorjsürengiin Sumiyaa (MGL)	Jessica Klimkait (CAN)
Half-middleweight (−63 kg)	Miku Tashiro (JPN)	Kathrin Unterwurzacher (AUT)	Edwige Gwend (ITA)
Half-middleweight (−63 kg)	Miku Tashiro (JPN)	Kathrin Unterwurzacher (AUT)	Magdalena Krssakova (AUT)
Middleweight (−70 kg)	Naeko Maeda (JPN)	Kim Seong-yeon (KOR)	Natascha Ausma (NED)
Middleweight (−70 kg)	Naeko Maeda (JPN)	Kim Seong-yeon (KOR)	Barbara Matić (CRO)
Half-heavyweight (−78 kg)	Bernadette Graf (AUT)	Karen Stevenson (NED)	Lee Jeong-yun (KOR)
Half-heavyweight (−78 kg)	Bernadette Graf (AUT)	Karen Stevenson (NED)	Ruika Sato (JPN)
Heavyweight (+78 kg)	Han Mi-jin (KOR)	Yelyzaveta Kalanina (UKR)	Battulgyn Mönkhtuyaa (MGL)
Heavyweight (+78 kg)	Han Mi-jin (KOR)	Yelyzaveta Kalanina (UKR)	Sara Yamamoto (JPN)

Source Results

=== Medal table ===
* Host nation (China)

Rank	Nation	Gold	Silver	Bronze	Total
1	Japan (JPN)	5	0	3	8
2	Russia (RUS)	2	3	6	11
3	South Korea (KOR)	2	1	2	5
4	Canada (CAN)	1	2	1	4
5	Austria (AUT)	1	1	1	3
6	China (CHN)*	1	0	2	3
7	Czech Republic (CZE)	1	0	0	1
7	North Korea (PRK)	1	0	0	1
9	Mongolia (MGL)	0	3	5	8
10	Ukraine (UKR)	0	2	1	3
11	Netherlands (NED)	0	1	1	2
12	Serbia (SRB)	0	1	0	1
13	Croatia (CRO)	0	0	1	1
13	Germany (GER)	0	0	1	1
13	Hungary (HUN)	0	0	1	1
13	Iran (IRI)	0	0	1	1
13	Italy (ITA)	0	0	1	1
13	Sweden (SWE)	0	0	1	1
Totals (18 entries)		14	14	28	56
