= Lola Benarroche =

French judoka (born 1991)

Personal information
- Born: 15 March 1991 (age 35)
- Occupation: Judoka

Sport
- Country: France
- Sport: Judo
- Weight class: ‍–‍57 kg
Medal record
Women's judo
Representing France
IJF Grand Slam
Bronze medal – third place	2016 Abu Dhabi	‍–‍57 kg
IJF Grand Prix
Gold medal – first place	2016 Zagreb	‍–‍57 kg
European U23 Championships
Silver medal – second place	2013 Samokov	‍–‍57 kg
European Junior Championships
Silver medal – second place	2008 Warsaw	‍–‍52 kg
Summer Universiade
Gold medal – first place	2017 Taipei	‍–‍57 kg

Profile at external databases
- IJF: 4536
- JudoInside.com: 41874
- Updated on 25 November 2022

Lola Benarroche (born 15 March 1991) is a French judoka.

Benarroche is a bronze medalist of the 2016 Judo Grand Slam Abu Dhabi in the ‍–‍57 kg category.
