= 2013 European U23 Judo Championships =

Judo competition

Judo 2013 European U23 Judo Championships
- Location: Samokov, Bulgaria
- Dates: 15–17 November 2013

Competition at external databases
- Links: JudoInside

The 2013 European U23 Judo Championships is an edition of the European U23 Judo Championships, organised by the European Judo Union. It was held in Samokov, Bulgaria from 15 to 17 November 2013.

== Medal summary ==
=== Medal table ===
* Host nation (Bulgaria)

Rank	Nation	Gold	Silver	Bronze	Total
1	Russia (RUS)	2	3	5	10
2	Hungary (HUN)	2	0	1	3
2	Romania (ROU)	2	0	1	3
4	France (FRA)	1	3	1	5
5	Germany (GER)	1	1	2	4
6	Austria (AUT)	1	1	0	2
7	Bulgaria (BUL)*	1	0	1	2
7	Ukraine (UKR)	1	0	1	2
9	Belgium (BEL)	1	0	0	1
9	Portugal (POR)	1	0	0	1
9	Turkey (TUR)	1	0	0	1
12	Italy (ITA)	0	2	3	5
13	Israel (ISR)	0	1	1	2
13	Netherlands (NED)	0	1	1	2
13	Slovenia (SLO)	0	1	1	2
16	Serbia (SRB)	0	1	0	1
17	Croatia (CRO)	0	0	2	2
17	Switzerland (SUI)	0	0	2	2
19	Armenia (ARM)	0	0	1	1
19	Estonia (EST)	0	0	1	1
19	Finland (FIN)	0	0	1	1
19	Kosovo (KOS)	0	0	1	1
19	Poland (POL)	0	0	1	1
19	Sweden (SWE)	0	0	1	1
Totals (24 entries)		14	14	28	56

=== Men's events ===
Event	Gold	Silver	Bronze
Extra-lightweight (−60 kg)	Aram Grigoryan (RUS)	Albert Oguzov (RUS)	Vadoud Balatkhanov (FIN)
Extra-lightweight (−60 kg)	Aram Grigoryan (RUS)	Albert Oguzov (RUS)	Valentin Rota (SUI)
Half-lightweight (−66 kg)	Gábor Hagyó (HUN)	Emanuele Bruno (ITA)	Andraz Jereb (SLO)
Half-lightweight (−66 kg)	Gábor Hagyó (HUN)	Emanuele Bruno (ITA)	Yakub Shamilov (RUS)
Lightweight (−73 kg)	Jonathan Allardon (FRA)	Andrea Regis (ITA)	Feliks Galuaev (RUS)
Lightweight (−73 kg)	Jonathan Allardon (FRA)	Andrea Regis (ITA)	Enrico Parlati (ITA)
Half-middleweight (−81 kg)	Ivaylo Ivanov (BUL)	Khasan Khalmurzaev (RUS)	Andranik Chaparyan (ARM)
Half-middleweight (−81 kg)	Ivaylo Ivanov (BUL)	Khasan Khalmurzaev (RUS)	Hannes Conrad (GER)
Middleweight (−90 kg)	Krisztián Tóth (HUN)	Aleksandar Kukolj (SRB)	Alexandre Iddir (FRA)
Middleweight (−90 kg)	Krisztián Tóth (HUN)	Aleksandar Kukolj (SRB)	Giuliano Loporchio (ITA)
Half-heavyweight (−100 kg)	Jorge Fonseca (POR)	Clément Delvert (FRA)	Shamil Magomedov (RUS)
Half-heavyweight (−100 kg)	Jorge Fonseca (POR)	Clément Delvert (FRA)	Grigori Minaškin (EST)
Heavyweight (+100 kg)	Stepan Sarkisian (RUS)	Daniel Allerstorfer (AUT)	Sven Heinle (GER)
Heavyweight (+100 kg)	Stepan Sarkisian (RUS)	Daniel Allerstorfer (AUT)	Daniel Natea (ROU)

=== Women's events ===
Event	Gold	Silver	Bronze
Extra-lightweight (−48 kg)	Ebru Sahin (TUR)	Kristina Vrsic (SLO)	Noa Minsker (ISR)
Extra-lightweight (−48 kg)	Ebru Sahin (TUR)	Kristina Vrsic (SLO)	Mariia Persidskaia (RUS)
Half-lightweight (−52 kg)	Alexandra-Larisa Florian (ROU)	Gili Cohen (ISR)	Odette Giuffrida (ITA)
Half-lightweight (−52 kg)	Alexandra-Larisa Florian (ROU)	Gili Cohen (ISR)	Distria Krasniqi (KOS)
Lightweight (−57 kg)	Loredana Ohai (ROU)	Lola Benarroche (FRA)	Ivelina Ilieva (BUL)
Lightweight (−57 kg)	Loredana Ohai (ROU)	Lola Benarroche (FRA)	Fabienne Kocher (SUI)
Half-middleweight (−63 kg)	Kathrin Unterwurzacher (AUT)	Maelle Di Cintio (FRA)	Andreja Dakovic Cizmek (CRO)
Half-middleweight (−63 kg)	Kathrin Unterwurzacher (AUT)	Maelle Di Cintio (FRA)	Emma Barkeling (SWE)
Middleweight (−70 kg)	Roxane Taeymans (BEL)	Alena Prokopenko (RUS)	Franciska Szabó (HUN)
Middleweight (−70 kg)	Roxane Taeymans (BEL)	Alena Prokopenko (RUS)	Karolina Tałach (POL)
Half-heavyweight (−78 kg)	Anastasiya Turchyn (UKR)	Julia Tillmanns (GER)	Ivana Maranić (CRO)
Half-heavyweight (−78 kg)	Anastasiya Turchyn (UKR)	Julia Tillmanns (GER)	Guusje Steenhuis (NED)
Heavyweight (+78 kg)	Kristin Buessow (GER)	Tessie Savelkouls (NED)	Aydana Nagorova (RUS)
Heavyweight (+78 kg)	Kristin Buessow (GER)	Tessie Savelkouls (NED)	Galyna Tarasova (UKR)

Source Results
