= Fjolla Kelmendi =

Kosovan judoka

Personal information
- Nationality: Kosovan
- Born: 14 December 1990 (age 35)
- Occupation: Judoka

Sport
- Country: Kosovo
- Sport: Judo
- Weight class: –48 kg

Achievements and titles
- European Champ.: R16 (2017)
Medal record
Women's judo
Representing Kosovo
IJF Grand Prix
Silver medal – second place	2018 Antalya	–48 kg
Bronze medal – third place	2016 Zagreb	–48 kg

Profile at external databases
- IJF: 27665
- JudoInside.com: 99965
- Updated on 1 December 2022

Fjolla Kelmendi (born 14 December 1990) is a Kosovar judoka.

She is the silver medallist of the 2018 Judo Grand Prix Antalya in the -48 kg category.

She is the cousin of Olympic Champion Majlinda Kelmendi.
