= 2016 Judo Grand Prix Zagreb =

Judo competition

Judo 2016 Judo Grand Prix Zagreb
- Venue: Dom Sportova
- Location: Zagreb, Croatia
- Dates: 23–25 September 2016
- Competitors: 229 from 31 nations

Competition at external databases
- Links: IJF • EJU • JudoInside

The 2016 Judo Grand Prix Zagreb was held at the Dom Sportova in Zagreb, Croatia from 23 to 25 September 2016.

== Medal summary ==
=== Men's events ===
Event	Gold	Silver	Bronze
Extra-lightweight (−60 kg)	Vincent Manquest (FRA)	Robert Mshvidobadze (RUS)	Joaquin Gomis (ESP)
Extra-lightweight (−60 kg)	Vincent Manquest (FRA)	Robert Mshvidobadze (RUS)	Cédric Revol (FRA)
Half-lightweight (−66 kg)	Andraž Jereb (SLO)	Baruch Shmailov (ISR)	Tal Flicker (ISR)
Half-lightweight (−66 kg)	Andraž Jereb (SLO)	Baruch Shmailov (ISR)	Abdula Abdulzhalilov (RUS)
Lightweight (−73 kg)	Dmytro Kanivets (UKR)	Tommy Macias (SWE)	Arbi Khamkhoev (RUS)
Lightweight (−73 kg)	Dmytro Kanivets (UKR)	Tommy Macias (SWE)	Sukhrob Tursunov (UZB)
Half-middleweight (−81 kg)	Alan Khubetsov (RUS)	László Csoknyai (HUN)	Aslan Lappinagov (RUS)
Half-middleweight (−81 kg)	Alan Khubetsov (RUS)	László Csoknyai (HUN)	Damian Szwarnowiecki (POL)
Middleweight (−90 kg)	Alexander Grigorev (RUS)	Li Kochman (ISR)	Piotr Kuczera (POL)
Middleweight (−90 kg)	Alexander Grigorev (RUS)	Li Kochman (ISR)	Max Stewart (GBR)
Half-heavyweight (−100 kg)	Adlan Bisultanov (RUS)	Michael Korrel (NED)	Joakim Dvärby (SWE)
Half-heavyweight (−100 kg)	Adlan Bisultanov (RUS)	Michael Korrel (NED)	Laurin Boehler (AUT)
Heavyweight (+100 kg)	Daniel Natea (ROU)	Sven Heinle (GER)	Stanislav Bondarenko (UKR)
Heavyweight (+100 kg)	Daniel Natea (ROU)	Sven Heinle (GER)	Benjamin Harmegnies (BEL)

=== Women's events ===
Event	Gold	Silver	Bronze
Extra-lightweight (−48 kg)	Milica Nikolić (SRB)	Noa Minsker (ISR)	Fjolla Kelmendi (KOS)
Extra-lightweight (−48 kg)	Milica Nikolić (SRB)	Noa Minsker (ISR)	Cheyenne Mounier (FRA)
Half-lightweight (−52 kg)	Karolina Pieńkowska (POL)	Distria Krasniqi (KOS)	Angelica Delgado (USA)
Half-lightweight (−52 kg)	Karolina Pieńkowska (POL)	Distria Krasniqi (KOS)	Kelly Edwards (GBR)
Lightweight (−57 kg)	Lola Benarroche (FRA)	Daria Kurbonmamadova (RUS)	Natalia Golomidova (RUS)
Lightweight (−57 kg)	Lola Benarroche (FRA)	Daria Kurbonmamadova (RUS)	Bekky Livesey (GBR)
Half-middleweight (−63 kg)	Karolina Tałach (POL)	Diana Dzhigaros (RUS)	Magdalena Krssakova (AUT)
Half-middleweight (−63 kg)	Karolina Tałach (POL)	Diana Dzhigaros (RUS)	Rotem Shor (ISR)
Middleweight (−70 kg)	Barbara Matić (CRO)	Katarzyna Kłys (POL)	Anka Pogačnik (SLO)
Middleweight (−70 kg)	Barbara Matić (CRO)	Katarzyna Kłys (POL)	Aleksandra Samardžić (BIH)
Half-heavyweight (−78 kg)	Abigél Joó (HUN)	Guusje Steenhuis (NED)	Sama Hawa Camara (FRA)
Half-heavyweight (−78 kg)	Abigél Joó (HUN)	Guusje Steenhuis (NED)	Antonina Shmeleva (RUS)
Heavyweight (+78 kg)	Larisa Cerić (BIH)	Carolin Weiß (GER)	Sandra Jablonskytė (LTU)
Heavyweight (+78 kg)	Larisa Cerić (BIH)	Carolin Weiß (GER)	Ivana Šutalo (CRO)

Source Results

=== Medal table ===
* Host nation (Croatia)

Rank	Nation	Gold	Silver	Bronze	Total
1	Russia (RUS)	3	3	5	11
2	Poland (POL)	2	1	2	5
3	France (FRA)	2	0	3	5
4	Hungary (HUN)	1	1	0	2
5	Bosnia and Herzegovina (BIH)	1	0	1	2
5	Croatia (CRO)*	1	0	1	2
5	Slovenia (SLO)	1	0	1	2
5	Ukraine (UKR)	1	0	1	2
9	Romania (ROU)	1	0	0	1
9	Serbia (SRB)	1	0	0	1
11	Israel (ISR)	0	3	2	5
12	Germany (GER)	0	2	0	2
12	Netherlands (NED)	0	2	0	2
14	Kosovo (KOS)	0	1	1	2
14	Sweden (SWE)	0	1	1	2
16	Great Britain (GBR)	0	0	3	3
17	Austria (AUT)	0	0	2	2
18	Belgium (BEL)	0	0	1	1
18	Lithuania (LTU)	0	0	1	1
18	Spain (ESP)	0	0	1	1
18	United States (USA)	0	0	1	1
18	Uzbekistan (UZB)	0	0	1	1
Totals (22 entries)		14	14	28	56
