= Gabriela Chibana =

Brazilian judoka (born 1993)

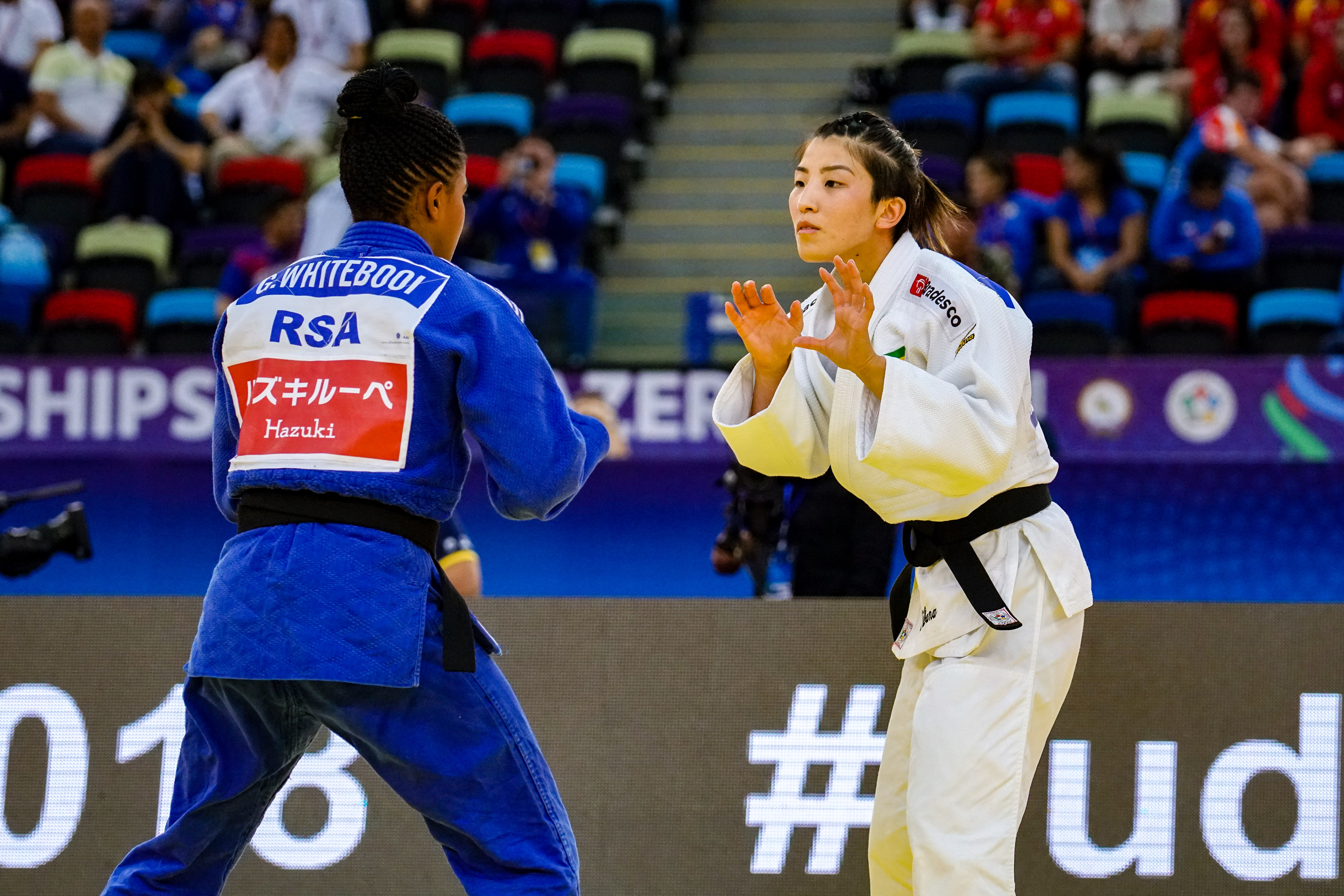
- Chibana in 2018

Personal information
- Born: 7 August 1993 (age 32) São Paulo, Brazil
- Occupation: Judoka

Sport
- Country: Brazil
- Sport: Judo
- Weight class: ‍–‍48 kg

Achievements and titles
- Olympic Games: R16 (2020)
- World Champ.: R32 (2018)
- Pan American Champ.: (2021)
Medal record
Women's judo
Representing Brazil
Pan American Championships
Silver medal – second place	2021 Guadalajara	‍–‍48 kg
IJF Grand Slam
Silver medal – second place	2012 Rio de Janeiro	‍–‍48 kg
Silver medal – second place	2019 Brasilia	‍–‍48 kg
IJF Grand Prix
Gold medal – first place	2012 Abu Dhabi	‍–‍48 kg
Gold medal – first place	2017 Cancún	‍–‍48 kg
Bronze medal – third place	2012 Qingdao	‍–‍48 kg
South American Junior Championships
Bronze medal – third place	2013 Buenos Aires	‍–‍48 kg
Pan American Cadet Championships
Gold medal – first place	2009 San Salvador	‍–‍44 kg
Summer Universiade
Silver medal – second place	2015 Gwangju	‍–‍48 kg
Silver medal – second place	2017 Taipei	‍–‍48 kg

Profile at external databases
- IJF: 7527
- JudoInside.com: 58271
- Updated on 21 November 2022

Gabriela Chibana (born 7 August 1993) is a Brazilian judoka.

Chibana is the silver medalist of the 2019 Judo Grand Slam Brasilia in the ‍–‍48 kg category.

Chibana represented Brazil at the 2020 Summer Olympics. She competed in the women's 48 kg event.
