= 2018 Judo Grand Prix Zagreb =

Judo competition

Judo 2018 Judo Grand Prix Zagreb
- Venue: Arena Zagreb
- Location: Zagreb, Croatia
- Dates: 27–29 July 2018
- Competitors: 513 from 78 nations

Competition at external databases
- Links: IJF • EJU • JudoInside

The 2018 Judo Grand Prix Zagreb was held at Arena Zagreb in Zagreb, Croatia, from 27 to 29 July 2018.

== Medal summary ==
=== Men's events ===
Event	Gold	Silver	Bronze
Extra-lightweight (−60 kg)	Naohisa Takato (JPN)	Adonis Diaz (USA)	Ashley McKenzie (GBR)
Extra-lightweight (−60 kg)	Naohisa Takato (JPN)	Adonis Diaz (USA)	David Pulkrábek (CZE)
Half-lightweight (−66 kg)	Tal Flicker (ISR)	Georgii Zantaraia (UKR)	Hifumi Abe (JPN)
Half-lightweight (−66 kg)	Tal Flicker (ISR)	Georgii Zantaraia (UKR)	Baruch Shmailov (ISR)
Lightweight (−73 kg)	Akil Gjakova (KOS)	Fabio Basile (ITA)	Tohar Butbul (ISR)
Lightweight (−73 kg)	Akil Gjakova (KOS)	Fabio Basile (ITA)	Rustam Orujov (AZE)
Half-middleweight (−81 kg)	Dominic Ressel (GER)	Matthias Casse (BEL)	Anri Egutidze (POR)
Half-middleweight (−81 kg)	Dominic Ressel (GER)	Matthias Casse (BEL)	Sotaro Fujiwara (JPN)
Middleweight (−90 kg)	Avtandili Tchrikishvili (GEO)	Asley González (CUB)	Nemanja Majdov (SRB)
Middleweight (−90 kg)	Avtandili Tchrikishvili (GEO)	Asley González (CUB)	Mammadali Mehdiyev (AZE)
Half-heavyweight (−100 kg)	Niyaz Ilyasov (RUS)	Kyle Reyes (CAN)	Lasha Taveluri (GEO)
Half-heavyweight (−100 kg)	Niyaz Ilyasov (RUS)	Kyle Reyes (CAN)	Kentaro Iida (JPN)
Heavyweight (+100 kg)	Guram Tushishvili (GEO)	Or Sasson (ISR)	Inal Tasoev (RUS)
Heavyweight (+100 kg)	Guram Tushishvili (GEO)	Or Sasson (ISR)	Iakiv Khammo (UKR)

=== Women's events ===
Event	Gold	Silver	Bronze
Extra-lightweight (−48 kg)	Daria Bilodid (UKR)	Irina Dolgova (RUS)	Funa Tonaki (JPN)
Extra-lightweight (−48 kg)	Daria Bilodid (UKR)	Irina Dolgova (RUS)	Otgontsetseg Galbadrakh (KAZ)
Half-lightweight (−52 kg)	Ai Shishime (JPN)	Amandine Buchard (FRA)	Angelica Delgado (USA)
Half-lightweight (−52 kg)	Ai Shishime (JPN)	Amandine Buchard (FRA)	Charline Van Snick (BEL)
Lightweight (−57 kg)	Christa Deguchi (CAN)	Jessica Klimkait (CAN)	Haruka Funakubo (JPN)
Lightweight (−57 kg)	Christa Deguchi (CAN)	Jessica Klimkait (CAN)	Hedvig Karakas (HUN)
Half-middleweight (−63 kg)	Nami Nabekura (JPN)	Tina Trstenjak (SLO)	Alexia Castilhos (BRA)
Half-middleweight (−63 kg)	Nami Nabekura (JPN)	Tina Trstenjak (SLO)	Catherine Beauchemin-Pinard (CAN)
Middleweight (−70 kg)	Marie-Ève Gahié (FRA)	Yoko Ono (JPN)	Assmaa Niang (MAR)
Middleweight (−70 kg)	Marie-Ève Gahié (FRA)	Yoko Ono (JPN)	Sally Conway (GBR)
Half-heavyweight (−78 kg)	Madeleine Malonga (FRA)	Klara Apotekar (SLO)	Anna-Maria Wagner (GER)
Half-heavyweight (−78 kg)	Madeleine Malonga (FRA)	Klara Apotekar (SLO)	Audrey Tcheuméo (FRA)
Heavyweight (+78 kg)	Anamari Velenšek (SLO)	Nihel Cheikh Rouhou (TUN)	Yelyzaveta Kalanina (UKR)
Heavyweight (+78 kg)	Anamari Velenšek (SLO)	Nihel Cheikh Rouhou (TUN)	Sarah Asahina (JPN)

Source Results

=== Medal table ===
* Host nation (Croatia)

Rank	Nation	Gold	Silver	Bronze	Total
1	Japan (JPN)	3	1	6	10
2	France (FRA)	2	1	1	4
3	Georgia (GEO)	2	0	1	3
4	Canada (CAN)	1	2	1	4
5	Slovenia (SLO)	1	2	0	3
6	Israel (ISR)	1	1	2	4
6	Ukraine (UKR)	1	1	2	4
8	Russia (RUS)	1	1	1	3
9	Germany (GER)	1	0	1	2
10	Kosovo (KOS)	1	0	0	1
11	Belgium (BEL)	0	1	1	2
11	United States (USA)	0	1	1	2
13	Cuba (CUB)	0	1	0	1
13	Italy (ITA)	0	1	0	1
13	Tunisia (TUN)	0	1	0	1
16	Azerbaijan (AZE)	0	0	2	2
16	Great Britain (GBR)	0	0	2	2
18	Brazil (BRA)	0	0	1	1
18	Czech Republic (CZE)	0	0	1	1
18	Hungary (HUN)	0	0	1	1
18	Kazakhstan (KAZ)	0	0	1	1
18	Morocco (MAR)	0	0	1	1
18	Portugal (POR)	0	0	1	1
18	Serbia (SRB)	0	0	1	1
Totals (24 entries)		14	14	28	56
