= Funa Tonaki =

Japanese judoka (born 1995)

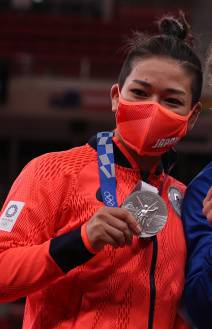
- Tonaki at the 2020 Summer Olympics

Personal information
- Native name: 渡名喜 風南
- Nationality: Japanese
- Born: 1 August 1995 (age 30) Sagamihara, Japan
- Occupation: Judoka
- Height: 148 cm (4 ft 10 in)

Sport
- Country: Japan
- Sport: Judo
- Weight class: –48 kg
- Rank: 3rd dan black belt
- Club: Park24
- Retired: 31 January 2024

Achievements and titles
- Olympic Games: (silver) (2020)
- World Champ.: (2017)
- Asian Champ.: (bronze) (2016)
Medal record
Women's judo
Representing Japan
Olympic Games
| Silver medal – second place | 2020 Tokyo | ‍–‍48 kg |
World Championships
| Gold medal – first place | 2017 Budapest | ‍–‍48 kg |
| Silver medal – second place | 2018 Baku | ‍–‍48 kg |
| Silver medal – second place | 2019 Tokyo | ‍–‍48 kg |
Asian Championships
| Bronze medal – third place | 2016 Tashkent | ‍–‍48 kg |
World Masters
| Gold medal – first place | 2017 Saint Petersburg | ‍–‍48 kg |
| Silver medal – second place | 2021 Doha | ‍–‍48 kg |
IJF Grand Slam
| Gold medal – first place | 2016 Tyumen | ‍–‍48 kg |
| Gold medal – first place | 2018 Osaka | ‍–‍48 kg |
| Gold medal – first place | 2019 Düsseldorf | ‍–‍48 kg |
| Gold medal – first place | 2019 Osaka | ‍–‍48 kg |
| Gold medal – first place | 2021 Kazan | ‍–‍48 kg |
| Gold medal – first place | 2022 Budapest | ‍–‍48 kg |
| Silver medal – second place | 2020 Düsseldorf | ‍–‍48 kg |
| Bronze medal – third place | 2016 Tokyo | ‍–‍48 kg |
| Bronze medal – third place | 2017 Tokyo | ‍–‍48 kg |
IJF Grand Prix
| Gold medal – first place | 2015 Qingdao | ‍–‍48 kg |
| Gold medal – first place | 2017 Düsseldorf | ‍–‍48 kg |
| Gold medal – first place | 2019 Budapest | ‍–‍48 kg |
| Silver medal – second place | 2015 Budapest | ‍–‍48 kg |
| Bronze medal – third place | 2018 Zagreb | ‍–‍48 kg |
World Juniors Championships
| Gold medal – first place | 2015 Abu Dhabi | ‍–‍48 kg |
Asian Junior Championships
| Gold medal – first place | 2013 Hainan | ‍–‍48 kg |
Summer Universiade
| Bronze medal – third place | 2015 Gwangju | ‍–‍48 kg |

Profile at external databases
- IJF: 17762
- JudoInside.com: 2167
- Updated on 23 May 2023

Funa Tonaki (渡名喜 風南 Tonaki Fūna, born 1 August 1995) is a Japanese retired judoka. She won a silver medal in Women's Judo 48 kg, at the 2020 Summer Olympics held in Tokyo, Japan.

== Career ==
In 2015, she won the gold medal at the World Junior Championships in Abu Dhabi. She won the gold medal at the 2017 World Judo Championships in Budapest by defeating top seed Galbadrakhyn Otgontsetseg in the semi-final and former world champion Mönkhbatyn Urantsetseg in the final.

In 2021, she won the silver medal in her event at the 2021 Judo World Masters held in Doha, Qatar.
