= Dilara Lokmanhekim =

Turkish judoka (born 1994)

Personal information
- Nationality: Turkish
- Born: 18 April 1994 (age 32) Antalya, Turkey
- Occupation: Judoka
- Height: 157 cm (5 ft 2 in)

Sport
- Country: Turkey
- Sport: Judo
- Weight class: ‍–‍48 kg

Achievements and titles
- Olympic Games: R32 (2016)
- World Champ.: R16 (2015)
- European Champ.: (bronze) (2016)
Medal record
Women's judo
Representing Turkey
European Championships
Bronze medal – third place	2016 Kazan	‍–‍48 kg
World Masters
Bronze medal – third place	2015 Rabat	‍–‍48 kg
IJF Grand Slam
Bronze medal – third place	2014 Baku	‍–‍48 kg
Bronze medal – third place	2015 Abu Dhabi	‍–‍48 kg
IJF Grand Prix
Gold medal – first place	2015 Zagreb	‍–‍48 kg
Silver medal – second place	2016 Samsun	‍–‍48 kg
Bronze medal – third place	2014 Tbilisi	‍–‍48 kg
Bronze medal – third place	2015 Samsun	‍–‍48 kg
Bronze medal – third place	2015 Jeju	‍–‍48 kg
European U23 Championships
Gold medal – first place	2012 Prague	‍–‍48 kg
World Juniors Championships
Silver medal – second place	2014 Fort Lauderdale	‍–‍48 kg
European Junior Championships
Gold medal – first place	2012 Poreč	‍–‍48 kg
Gold medal – first place	2014 Bucharest	‍–‍48 kg

Profile at external databases
- IJF: 12221
- JudoInside.com: 57753
- Updated on 11 November 2022

Dilara Lokmanhekim (born 18 April 1994) is a Turkish judoka competing in the lightweight (‍–‍48 kg) division.

Lokmanhekim was born in Antalya, Turkey on 18 April 1994. She has a younger sister. She is a student of Physical Education and Sports College at Bülent Ecevit University in Zonguldak.

Lokmanhekim was introduced to judo at school, and began to compete in 2005. In 2013, she was seriously injured on her knee, underwent a surgery and said the rehabilitation period had affected "my psychology quiet badly.”

Lokmanhekim won two junior European Junior Championships at the 2012 and 2014, and another one in the European U23 Championships in 2012. Lokmanheim became silver medalist at the 2014 World Junior Championships in Florida, USA.

In 2015, Lokmanhekim won a gold medal at the Zagreb Grand Prix. At the European Open Prague 2015, Czech Republic, she earned a bronze medal. Lokmanhekim won a bronze medal at the 2015 Judo World Masters held in Rabat, Morocco. She placed 7th at the 2015 European Games in Baku, Azerbaijan. At the 2015 Abu Dhabi Grand Slam, she took the bronze medal. She took the bronze medal at the 2015 Jeju Grand Prix in Jeju, South Korea.

Lokmanhekim won a bronze medal at the 2016 European Judo Championships in Kazan, Russia.
