= Aziza Chakir =

Moroccan judoka (born 1998)

Personal information
- Born: 19 May 1998 (age 28)
- Occupation: Judoka

Sport
- Country: Morocco
- Sport: Judo
- Weight class: ‍–‍48 kg

Achievements and titles
- World Champ.: R32 (2017)
- African Champ.: (silver) (2018, 2020, 2023)
Medal record
Women's judo
Representing Morocco
African Games
Bronze medal – third place	2019 Rabat	‍–‍48 kg
African Championships
Silver medal – second place	2018 Tunis	‍–‍48 kg
Silver medal – second place	2020 Antananarivo	‍–‍48 kg
Silver medal – second place	2023 Casablanca	‍–‍48 kg
Bronze medal – third place	2017 Antananarivo	‍–‍48 kg
Bronze medal – third place	2024 Cairo	‍–‍48 kg
African Junior Championships
Bronze medal – third place	2016 Casablanca	‍–‍48 kg
Jeux de la Francophonie
Bronze medal – third place	2017 Abidjan	‍–‍48 kg
Bronze medal – third place	2023 Kinshasa	‍–‍48 kg

Profile at external databases
- IJF: 12929
- JudoInside.com: 40903
- Updated on 19 February 2025

Aziza Chakir (born 19 May 1998) is a Moroccan judoka. She is a bronze medalist at the African Games and a four-time medalist at the African Judo Championships. She is also a bronze medalist at the Jeux de la Francophonie.

== Career ==
In 2017, she competed in the women's 48 kg event at the World Judo Championships held in Budapest, Hungary. She also competed in the women's 48 kg event at the 2018 Mediterranean Games held in Tarragona, Spain.

In 2020, she won the silver medal in women's 48 kg event at the African Judo Championships held in Antananarivo, Madagascar.

In January 2021, she competed in the women's 48 kg event at the Judo World Masters held in Doha, Qatar. At the 2021 African Judo Championships held in Dakar, Senegal, she lost her bronze medal match in her event. In June 2021, she was eliminated in her first match in the women's 48 kg event at the World Judo Championships held in Budapest, Hungary.

== Achievements ==
Year	Tournament	Place	Weight class
2017	African Championships	3rd	−48 kg
2017	Jeux de la Francophonie	3rd	−48 kg
2018	African Championships	2nd	−48 kg
2019	African Games	3rd	−48 kg
2020	African Championships	2nd	−48 kg
2023	African Championships	2nd	−48 kg
2024	African Championships	3rd	−48 kg
