= Li Yanan (judoka) =

Chinese judoka (born 1994)

Personal information
- Nationality: Chinese
- Born: 27 April 1994 (age 32)
- Occupation: Judoka

Sport
- Country: China
- Sport: Judo
- Weight class: –48 kg

Achievements and titles
- Olympic Games: R16 (2020)
- World Champ.: R16 (2017)
- Asian Champ.: (gold) (2019, 2021)
Medal record
Women's judo
Representing China
Asian Championships
Gold medal – first place	2019 Fujairah	–48 kg
Gold medal – first place	2021 Bishkek	–48 kg
IJF Grand Slam
Bronze medal – third place	2018 Abu Dhabi	–48 kg
IJF Grand Prix
Gold medal – first place	2016 Qingdao	–48 kg
Bronze medal – third place	2019 Zagreb	–48 kg

Profile at external databases
- IJF: 9826
- JudoInside.com: 55264
- Updated on 26 November 2022

Li Yanan (born 27 April 1994) is a Chinese judoka.

She is the gold medallist of the 2016 Judo Grand Prix Qingdao in the -48 kg category and is scheduled to present China at the.2020 Summer Olympics.
