= Văn Ngọc Tú =

Vietnamese judoka

Personal information
- Born: August 11, 1987 (age 39) Sóc Trăng, Vietnam

Sport
- Sport: Judo
Medal record
Representing Vietnam
Women's judo
Southeast Asian Games
Gold medal – first place	2005 Cebu	48kg
Gold medal – first place	2007 Nakhon Ratchasima	48kg
Gold medal – first place	2009 Vientiane	48kg
Gold medal – first place	2013 Naypyidaw	48kg
Silver medal – second place	2011 Jakarta-Palembang	48kg
Asian Championships
Bronze medal – third place	2011 Abu Dhabi	48kg

Văn Ngọc Tú (11 August 1987, Sóc Trăng) is a Vietnamese judoka who competes in the women's 48 kg category. She was a four-time gold medalist at the Southeast Asian Games as well was a one-time silver medalist between 2005 and 2013. She also won a bronze medal at the 2011 Asian Judo Championships. At the 2012 Summer Olympics, she was defeated in the first round by future gold medalist of the event, Sarah Menezes. At the 2016 Summer Olympics, she was eliminated in the second round by Jeong Bo-kyeong. After this, she announced her retirement from competition.
