= Jeong Bo-kyeong =

South Korean judoka (born 1991)

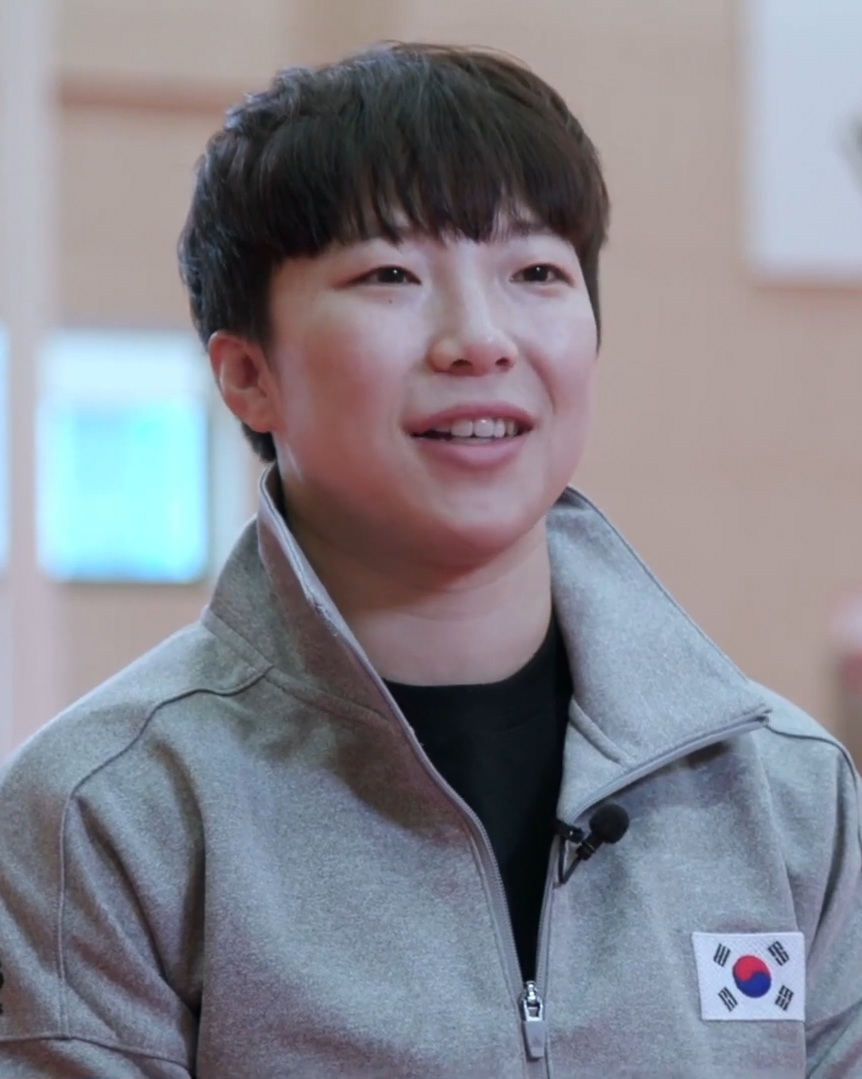
- Jeong in 2016

Personal information
- Nationality: South Korean
- Born: 17 April 1991 (age 35) Jinju, Gyeongsangnam-do, South Korea
- Occupation: Judoka
- Height: 153 cm (5 ft 0 in)

Korean name
- Hangul: 정보경
- Hanja: 鄭普涇
- RR: Jeong Bogyeong
- MR: Chŏng Pogyŏng
- IPA: [tɕʌŋ.bo.ɡjʌŋ]

Sport
- Country: South Korea
- Sport: Judo
- Weight class: –52 kg

Achievements and titles
- Olympic Games: (silver) (2016)
- World Champ.: (bronze) (2015)
- Asian Champ.: (gold) (2018)
Medal record
Women's judo
Representing South Korea
Olympic Games
Silver medal – second place	2016 Rio de Janeiro	‍–‍48 kg
World Championships
Bronze medal – third place	2015 Astana	‍–‍48 kg
Asian Games
Gold medal – first place	2018 Jakarta	‍–‍48 kg
Silver medal – second place	2014 Incheon	Women's team
Bronze medal – third place	2014 Incheon	‍–‍48 kg
Asian Championships
Bronze medal – third place	2017 Hong Kong	‍–‍48 kg
World Masters
Bronze medal – third place	2017 Saint Petersburg	‍–‍48 kg
IJF Grand Slam
Gold medal – first place	2017 Paris	‍–‍48 kg
Silver medal – second place	2016 Tokyo	‍–‍48 kg
Bronze medal – third place	2011 Tokyo	‍–‍48 kg
Bronze medal – third place	2012 Tokyo	‍–‍48 kg
Bronze medal – third place	2014 Tokyo	‍–‍48 kg
Bronze medal – third place	2017 Tokyo	‍–‍48 kg
Bronze medal – third place	2021 Tashkent	‍–‍52 kg
IJF Grand Prix
Gold medal – first place	2016 Düsseldorf	‍–‍48 kg
Gold medal – first place	2019 Tashkent	‍–‍52 kg
Silver medal – second place	2013 Düsseldorf	‍–‍48 kg
Silver medal – second place	2013 Jeju	‍–‍48 kg
Silver medal – second place	2014 Ulaanbaatar	‍–‍48 kg
Silver medal – second place	2015 Tashkent	‍–‍48 kg
Silver medal – second place	2016 Almaty	‍–‍48 kg
Silver medal – second place	2020 Tel Aviv	‍–‍52 kg
Bronze medal – third place	2011 Qingdao	‍–‍48 kg
Bronze medal – third place	2014 Jeju	‍–‍48 kg
Bronze medal – third place	2015 Düsseldorf	‍–‍48 kg
Bronze medal – third place	2015 Jeju	‍–‍48 kg
Bronze medal – third place	2019 Montreal	‍–‍52 kg
Summer Universiade
Gold medal – first place	2015 Gwangju	‍–‍48 kg
Bronze medal – third place	2017 Taipei	‍–‍48 kg

Profile at external databases
- IJF: 8690
- JudoInside.com: 79955
- Updated on 21 May 2023

Jeong Bo-kyeong (Korean: 정보경; born 17 April 1991) is a South Korean judoka. As of 7 August 2016, she was ranked number 8 in the world.

== Career ==
She won a bronze medal at the 2015 World Judo Championships – Women's 48 kg. She won the silver medal at the 2016 Summer Olympics in the women's 48 kg event.
