= Valentina Moscatt =

Italian judoka (born 1987)

Personal information
- Born: 16 March 1987 (age 39)
- Occupation: Judoka

Sport
- Country: Italy
- Sport: Judo
- Weight class: ‍–‍48 kg

Achievements and titles
- Olympic Games: R32 (2016)
- World Champ.: 9th (2007)
- European Champ.: (silver) (2007)
Medal record
Women's judo
Representing Italy
European Championships
Silver medal – second place	2007 Belgrade	‍–‍48 kg
IJF Grand Slam
Bronze medal – third place	2014 Tyumen	‍–‍48 kg
IJF Grand Prix
Silver medal – second place	2014 Budapest	‍–‍48 kg
Bronze medal – third place	2013 Abu Dhabi	‍–‍48 kg
Bronze medal – third place	2014 Astana	‍–‍48 kg
Bronze medal – third place	2015 Zagreb	‍–‍48 kg
European U23 Championships
Bronze medal – third place	2008 Zagreb	‍–‍48 kg
European Junior Championships
Silver medal – second place	2004 Sofia	‍–‍48 kg
Silver medal – second place	2006 Tallinn	‍–‍48 kg

Profile at external databases
- IJF: 2652
- JudoInside.com: 28599
- Updated on 16 November 2022

Valentina Moscatt (born 16 March 1987) is an Italian judoka. She competed at the 2016 Summer Olympics in the women's 48 kg event, in which she was eliminated in the first round by Văn Ngọc Tú.

Moscattis an athlete of the Gruppo Sportivo Fiamme Oro.
