= Gülkader Şentürk =

Turkish judoka (born 1996)

Gulkader Senturk
Personal information
- Born: 8 January 1996 (age 30)
- Occupation: Judoka

Sport
- Country: Turkey
- Sport: Judo
- Weight class: ‍–‍48 kg

Achievements and titles
- Olympic Games: R32 (2020)
- World Champ.: R32 (2019)
- European Champ.: R16 (2018)
Medal record
Women's judo
Representing Turkey
IJF Grand Slam
Bronze medal – third place	2021 Antalya	‍–‍48 kg
IJF Grand Prix
Bronze medal – third place	2018 Antalya	‍–‍48 kg
Bronze medal – third place	2019 Zagreb	‍–‍48 kg
European Junior Championships
Bronze medal – third place	2014 Bucharest	‍–‍48 kg

Profile at external databases
- IJF: 8245
- JudoInside.com: 73600
- Updated on 21 November 2022

Gulkader Senturk (born 8 January 1996) is a Turkish judoka. She competed in the women's 48 kg event at the 2020 Summer Olympics held in Tokyo, Japan.

Senturk is a bronze medalist from the 2021 Judo Grand Slam Antalya in the ‍–‍48 kg category.

Senturk competed in the women's 48 kg event at the 2022 Mediterranean Games held in Oran, Algeria.
