= Charline Van Snick =

Belgian judoka (born 1990)

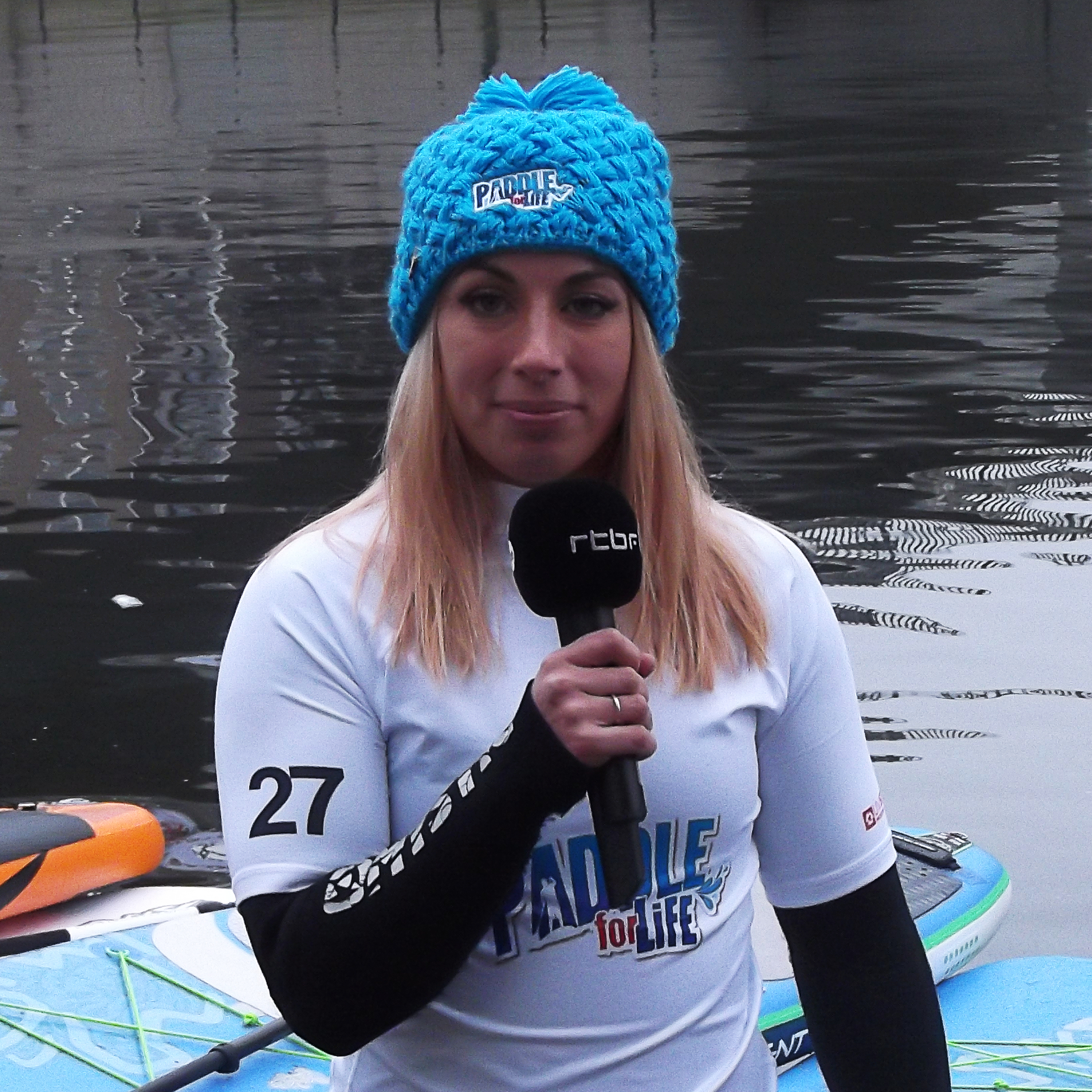
- Charline Van Snick in 2016

Personal information
- Nationality: Belgian
- Born: 2 September 1990 (age 35) Liège, Belgium
- Occupation: Judoka
- Website: charlinevansnick.be

Sport
- Country: Belgium
- Sport: Judo
- Weight class: ‍–‍48 kg, ‍–‍52 kg
- Retired: 6 February 2024

Achievements and titles
- Olympic Games: (bronze) (2012)
- World Champ.: (bronze) (2013)
- European Champ.: (gold) (2015, 2016)
Medal record
Women's judo
Representing Belgium
Olympic Games
| Bronze medal – third place | 2012 London | ‍–‍48 kg |
World Championships
| Bronze medal – third place | 2013 Rio de Janeiro | ‍–‍48 kg |
European Games
| Gold medal – first place | 2015 Baku | ‍–‍48 kg |
European Championships
| Gold medal – first place | 2016 Kazan | ‍–‍48 kg |
| Silver medal – second place | 2012 Chelyabinsk | ‍–‍48 kg |
| Silver medal – second place | 2013 Budapest | ‍–‍48 kg |
| Bronze medal – third place | 2010 Vienna | ‍–‍48 kg |
| Bronze medal – third place | 2020 Prague | ‍–‍52 kg |
World Masters
| Bronze medal – third place | 2018 Guangzhou | ‍–‍52 kg |
IJF Grand Slam
| Gold medal – first place | 2017 Abu Dhabi | ‍–‍52 kg |
| Silver medal – second place | 2015 Paris | ‍–‍48 kg |
| Bronze medal – third place | 2011 Rio de Janeiro | ‍–‍48 kg |
| Bronze medal – third place | 2011 Tokyo | ‍–‍48 kg |
| Bronze medal – third place | 2012 Moscow | ‍–‍48 kg |
| Bronze medal – third place | 2015 Baku | ‍–‍48 kg |
| Bronze medal – third place | 2017 Baku | ‍–‍52 kg |
| Bronze medal – third place | 2018 Düsseldorf | ‍–‍52 kg |
| Bronze medal – third place | 2019 Ekaterinburg | ‍–‍52 kg |
IJF Grand Prix
| Gold medal – first place | 2010 Rotterdam | ‍–‍48 kg |
| Gold medal – first place | 2011 Amsterdam | ‍–‍48 kg |
| Gold medal – first place | 2011 Qingdao | ‍–‍48 kg |
| Gold medal – first place | 2012 Düsseldorf | ‍–‍48 kg |
| Gold medal – first place | 2013 Samsun | ‍–‍48 kg |
| Gold medal – first place | 2014 Tashkent | ‍–‍48 kg |
| Gold medal – first place | 2015 Düsseldorf | ‍–‍48 kg |
| Gold medal – first place | 2018 The Hague | ‍–‍52 kg |
| Silver medal – second place | 2011 Düsseldorf | ‍–‍48 kg |
| Silver medal – second place | 2018 Budapest | ‍–‍52 kg |
| Bronze medal – third place | 2014 Zagreb | ‍–‍48 kg |
| Bronze medal – third place | 2017 Tashkent | ‍–‍52 kg |
| Bronze medal – third place | 2017 The Hague | ‍–‍52 kg |
| Bronze medal – third place | 2018 Zagreb | ‍–‍52 kg |
| Bronze medal – third place | 2019 Zagreb | ‍–‍52 kg |
| Bronze medal – third place | 2020 Tel Aviv | ‍–‍52 kg |
European Junior Championships
| Gold medal – first place | 2009 Yerevan | ‍–‍48 kg |
| Bronze medal – third place | 2008 Warsaw | ‍–‍48 kg |

Profile at external databases
- IJF: 1274
- JudoInside.com: 39298
- Updated on 21 May 2023

Charline Van Snick (born 2 September 1990 in Liège) is a Belgian retired judoka who won bronze in the women's 48 kg judo at the 2012 Summer Olympics. She also earned a bronze medal at the 2010 European Judo Championships and a silver medals at the 2012 and 2013 European Judo Championships.

Fighting in the ‍–‍48 kg division, Van Snick was Belgian cadet age class champion in 2006, and Belgian junior champion in 2007. She won a bronze medal at the 2008 European Junior Championships at the age of 17. She won the 2009 European Junior Championships and placed 5th in the 2009 World Junior Championships. As a reward for this, she was awarded the Sports Merit Trophy distributed by the French Community. In 2010, she won at her first senior European Championship medal, a bronze, in Vienna.

In 2012 Van Snick won the silver medal at the European Championships. On Saturday 28 July 2012, she won a bronze medal at the Olympic Games 2012 in London. In the qualifying round, she beat the Korean Chung Jung-yeon with ippon. In the quarter-finals, she beat the Hungarian Éva Csernoviczki, also with ippon. She lost in the semi-finals against the eventual Olympic champion, Sarah Menezes to yuko. The match which decided the bronze medal was won by Van Snick against the Argentinian Paula Pareto, after the latter got a second shido.

In April 2013 Van Snick won the silver medal at the European Championships, losing in the final to Csernoviczki.

She won two gold medals at European Championship level, in 2015 and 2016, as well as silvers in 2012 and 2013.

At the end of 2016, having lost in the second round at the 2016 Summer Olympics, Van Snick moved up to the ‍–‍52 kg weight division. In 2021, she competed in the women's 52 kg event at the 2020 Summer Olympics in Tokyo, Japan.

== Doping case ==
In August 2013 Van Snick won a bronze medal at the World Championships in Rio de Janeiro. On 14 October 2013 it was announced that Van Snick had tested positive for cocaine in Rio. Van Snick maintained her innocence. On 29 October 2013 it was announced that a hair analysis that Van Snick commissioned by the Katholieke Universiteit Leuven's toxicology lab proved negative for habitual cocaine use. Toxicological research proved the presence of 2,3 picogram cocaine per milligram in the hair for the period from 10 August to 10 October 2013, which is 200 times less than the amount in a strain for a habitual user, and a complete absence of cocaine in the part of the hair dating before 10 August. However, on 30 November 2013 it was announced that the official retest also showed positive for cocaine. On 3 January 2014, she was banned by the IJF for a period of two years. Van Snick announced she would appeal the ban with the Court for Arbitration for Sport (CAS). On 4 July 2014, CAS decided that Van Snick's appeal would be partially upheld. CAS found that the most likely explanation for the presence of cocaine was sabotage by a third party and consequently annulled the two-year ban. CAS acknowledged the existence of an anti-doping rule violation, but declared that Van Snick was not to blame. As the positive test was taken in competition, her results obtained during the Judo World Championships in Rio de Janeiro 2013 remain annulled in accordance with article 9 of the World Anti-Doping Code.

== Achievements ==
2007
(silver) Belgian Championships -48 kg, Hasselt
2008
(silver) Belgian Championships -48 kg, Herstal
(bronze) European U20 Championships -48 kg, Warsaw
2009
(gold) European Cup -48 kg, Baar
(gold) European Cup -48 kg, London
(gold) European U20 Championships -48 kg, Yerevan
2010
(gold) World Cup -48 kg, Sofia
(gold) World Cup -48 kg, Birmingham
(gold) Grand Prix -48 kg, Rotterdam
(bronze) European Championships -48 kg, Vienna
2011
(gold) World Cup -48 kg, São Paulo
(gold) Grand Prix -48 kg, Amsterdam
(gold) Grand Prix -48 kg, Qingdao
(gold) Belgian Championships -48 kg, Ronse
(silver) Grand Prix -48 kg, Düsseldorf
(bronze) Grand Slam -48 kg, Rio de Janeiro
(bronze) Grand Slam -48 kg, Tokyo
2012
(gold) Grand Prix -48 kg, Düsseldorf
(silver) European Championships -48 kg, Chelyabinsk
(bronze) Olympic Games -48 kg, London
(bronze) Grand Slam -48 kg, Moscow
2013
(gold) Grand Prix -48 kg, Samsun
(silver) European Championships -48 kg, Budapest
2014
(gold) Grand Prix -48 kg, Tashkent
(bronze) Grand Prix -48 kg, Zagreb
2015
(gold) European Games -48kg, Baku
(gold) European Championships -48kg, Baku
(gold) Grand Prix -48 kg, Düsseldorf
(bronze) Grand Slam -48 kg, Baku
(silver) Grand Slam -48 kg, Paris
2016
(gold) European Championships -48kg, Kazan
2017
(gold) Grand Slam -52 kg, Abu Dhabi
(bronze) Grand Slam -52 kg, Baku
(bronze) Grand Prix -52 kg, Tashkent
(bronze) Grand Prix -52 kg, The Hague
2018
(gold) Grand Prix -52 kg, The Hague
(silver) Grand Prix -52 kg, Budapest
(bronze) Grand Slam -52 kg, Düsseldorf
(bronze) Grand Prix -52 kg, Zagreb
2019
(bronze) Grand Slam -52 kg, Yekaterinburg

2020
(bronze) European Championships -52kg, Prague
