= Monica Ungureanu =

Romanian judoka (born 1988)

Personal information
- Full name: Elena Monica Ungureanu
- Born: 9 January 1988 (age 38) Craiova
- Occupation: Judoka
- Height: 1.64 m (5 ft 5 in)

Sport
- Country: Romania
- Sport: Judo
- Weight class: ‍–‍48 kg

Achievements and titles
- Olympic Games: R32 (2016)
- World Champ.: 7th (2015)
- European Champ.: (bronze) (2016, 2017)
Medal record
Women's judo
Representing Romania
European Championships
Bronze medal – third place	2016 Kazan	‍–‍48 kg
Bronze medal – third place	2017 Warsaw	‍–‍48 kg
IJF Grand Slam
Gold medal – first place	2015 Baku	‍–‍48 kg
Bronze medal – third place	2013 Moscow	‍–‍48 kg
IJF Grand Prix
Gold medal – first place	2014 Zagreb	‍–‍48 kg
Gold medal – first place	2014 Qingdao	‍–‍48 kg
Gold medal – first place	2016 Tbilisi	‍–‍48 kg
Silver medal – second place	2019 Marrakesh	‍–‍48 kg
Bronze medal – third place	2017 Düsseldorf	‍–‍48 kg
European Junior Championships
Bronze medal – third place	2006 Tallinn	‍–‍48 kg
European Cadet Championships
Bronze medal – third place	2004 Rotterdam	‍–‍48 kg

Profile at external databases
- IJF: 2046
- JudoInside.com: 32272
- Updated on 11 November 2022

Elena Monica Ungureanu (born 9 January 1988) is a Romanian judoka. She competed at the 2016 Summer Olympics in the women's 48 kg event, in which she was eliminated in the first round by Charline Van Snick.

In 2017, Ungureanu competed in the women's 48 kg event at the 2017 World Judo Championships held in Budapest, Hungary. In 2021, she competed in the women's 48 kg event at the 2021 World Judo Championships held in Budapest, Hungary.
