= Irina Dolgova =

Russian judoka (born 1995)

Personal information
- Full name: Irina Yuryevna Dolgova
- Nationality: (Russia) Russian
- Born: 26 September 1995 (age 30) Bratsk, Irkutsk Oblast, Russia
- Occupation: Judoka
- Height: 1.53 m (5 ft 0 in)

Sport
- Country: Russia
- Sport: Judo
- Weight class: ‍–‍48 kg

Achievements and titles
- Olympic Games: R16 (2016, 2020)
- World Champ.: 5th (2017)
- European Champ.: (gold) (2018)
Medal record
Women's judo
Representing Russia
European Games
Silver medal – second place	2019 Minsk	‍–‍48 kg
Bronze medal – third place	2015 Baku	‍–‍48 kg
European Championships
Gold medal – first place	2018 Tel Aviv	‍–‍48 kg
Silver medal – second place	2017 Warsaw	‍–‍48 kg
World Masters
Silver medal – second place	2017 Saint Petersburg	‍–‍48 kg
Bronze medal – third place	2015 Rabat	‍–‍48 kg
Bronze medal – third place	2018 Guangzhou	‍–‍48 kg
Bronze medal – third place	2019 Qingdao	‍–‍48 kg
IJF Grand Slam
Gold medal – first place	2015 Abu Dhabi	‍–‍48 kg
Gold medal – first place	2017 Abu Dhabi	‍–‍48 kg
Silver medal – second place	2021 Kazan	‍–‍48 kg
Bronze medal – third place	2015 Tyumen	‍–‍48 kg
Bronze medal – third place	2019 Ekaterinburg	‍–‍48 kg
IJF Grand Prix
Gold medal – first place	2014 Samsun	‍–‍48 kg
Gold medal – first place	2018 Agadir	‍–‍48 kg
Gold medal – first place	2019 Perth	‍–‍48 kg
Silver medal – second place	2017 Hohhot	‍–‍48 kg
Silver medal – second place	2018 Zagreb	‍–‍48 kg
Bronze medal – third place	2014 Tashkent	‍–‍48 kg
Bronze medal – third place	2015 Zagreb	‍–‍48 kg
Bronze medal – third place	2015 Tashkent	‍–‍48 kg
European U23 Championships
Silver medal – second place	2012 Prague	‍–‍48 kg
Silver medal – second place	2014 Wrocław	‍–‍48 kg
World Juniors Championships
Gold medal – first place	2013 Ljubljana	‍–‍48 kg
European Junior Championships
Gold medal – first place	2012 Poreč	‍–‍44 kg
Gold medal – first place	2013 Sarajevo	‍–‍48 kg
World Cadets Championships
Gold medal – first place	2011 Kyiv	‍–‍44 kg
European Cadet Championships
Gold medal – first place	2010 Teplice	‍–‍40 kg
Gold medal – first place	2011 Cottonera	‍–‍44 kg
Military World Games
Silver medal – second place	2019 Wuhan	‍–‍48 kg

Profile at external databases
- IJF: 8177
- JudoInside.com: 65037
- Updated on 10 November 2022

Irina Yuryevna Dolgova (Russian: Ирина Юрьевна Долгова; born 26 September 1995) is a Russian judoka. She competed at the 2016 Summer Olympics in the women's 48 kg event, in which she was eliminated in the second round by Paula Pareto. She also competed in the women's 48 kg event at the 2020 Summer Olympics held in Tokyo, Japan.
