= Noa Minsker =

Israeli judoka (born 1993)

Personal information
- Native name: נועה מינסקר
- Born: 29 June 1993 (age 33)
- Occupation: Judoka

Sport
- Country: Israel
- Sport: Judo
- Weight class: ‍–‍48 kg
- Rank: Black belt

Achievements and titles
- World Champ.: 7th (2017)
- European Champ.: 5th (2017)
Medal record
Women's judo
Representing Israel
IJF Grand Slam
Bronze medal – third place	2017 Baku	‍–‍48 kg
IJF Grand Prix
Silver medal – second place	2016 Zagreb	‍–‍48 kg
Bronze medal – third place	2017 Düsseldorf	‍–‍48 kg
Bronze medal – third place	2017 Antalya	‍–‍48 kg
European U23 Championships
Silver medal – second place	2015 Bratislava	‍–‍48 kg
Bronze medal – third place	2013 Samokov	‍–‍48 kg
European Junior Championships
Silver medal – second place	2012 Poreč	‍–‍48 kg

Profile at external databases
- IJF: 14853
- JudoInside.com: 85091
- Updated on 3 November 2021

Noa Minsker (Hebrew: נועה מינסקר; born 29 June 1993) is an Israeli judoka.

Minsker is a bronze medalist from the 2017 Judo Grand Prix Antalya in the ‍–‍48 kg category.
