= Otgontsetseg Galbadrakh =

Mongolian-born Kazakhstani judoka

Personal information
- Full name: Otgontsetseg Galbadrakhyn
- Nickname: Otgoo
- Nationality: Mongolian-Kazakhstani
- Born: 25 January 1992 (age 34) Ulaanbaatar, Mongolia
- Occupation: Judoka
- Height: 1.70 m (5 ft 7 in)

Sport
- Country: Mongolia (2011–14); Kazakhstan (since 2015)
- Sport: Judo
- Weight class: ‍–‍48 kg

Achievements and titles
- Olympic Games: (bronze) (2016)
- World Champ.: (bronze) (2017, 2018)
- Asian Champ.: (gold) (2016)
Medal record
Women's judo
Representing Kazakhstan
Olympic Games
Bronze medal – third place	2016 Rio de Janeiro	‍–‍48 kg
World Championships
Bronze medal – third place	2017 Budapest	‍–‍48 kg
Bronze medal – third place	2018 Baku	‍–‍48 kg
Asian Games
Bronze medal – third place	2018 Jakarta	‍–‍48 kg
Asian Championships
Gold medal – first place	2016 Tashkent	‍–‍48 kg
Silver medal – second place	2017 Hong Kong	‍–‍48 kg
Silver medal – second place	2019 Fujairah	‍–‍48 kg
IJF Grand Slam
Gold medal – first place	2016 Paris	‍–‍48 kg
Gold medal – first place	2016 Abu Dhabi	‍–‍48 kg
Bronze medal – third place	2016 Baku	‍–‍48 kg
Bronze medal – third place	2017 Ekaterinburg	‍–‍48 kg
Bronze medal – third place	2017 Abu Dhabi	‍–‍48 kg
Bronze medal – third place	2019 Paris	‍–‍48 kg
IJF Grand Prix
Gold medal – first place	2015 Jeju	‍–‍48 kg
Gold medal – first place	2016 Samsun	‍–‍48 kg
Gold medal – first place	2016 Almaty	‍–‍48 kg
Gold medal – first place	2017 Antalya	‍–‍48 kg
Gold medal – first place	2019 Zagreb	‍–‍48 kg
Silver medal – second place	2016 Düsseldorf	‍–‍48 kg
Silver medal – second place	2016 Ulaanbaatar	‍–‍48 kg
Silver medal – second place	2017 The Hague	‍–‍48 kg
Silver medal – second place	2019 Antalya	‍–‍48 kg
Bronze medal – third place	2015 Tashkent	‍–‍48 kg
Bronze medal – third place	2015 Qingdao	‍–‍48 kg
Bronze medal – third place	2016 Tbilisi	‍–‍48 kg
Bronze medal – third place	2018 Zagreb	‍–‍48 kg
Summer Universiade
Bronze medal – third place	2017 Taipei	‍–‍48 kg
Representing Mongolia
IJF Grand Slam
Silver medal – second place	2013 Baku	‍–‍48 kg
Silver medal – second place	2013 Moscow	‍–‍48 kg
IJF Grand Prix
Gold medal – first place	2014 Astana	‍–‍48 kg
Silver medal – second place	2013 Ulaanbaatar	‍–‍48 kg
Bronze medal – third place	2012 Abu Dhabi	‍–‍48 kg
Bronze medal – third place	2014 Budapest	‍–‍48 kg
Bronze medal – third place	2014 Ulaanbaatar	‍–‍48 kg
Bronze medal – third place	2014 Tashkent	‍–‍48 kg
Bronze medal – third place	2014 Qingdao	‍–‍48 kg

Profile at external databases
- IJF: 25530, 3773
- JudoInside.com: 79949
- Updated on 23 May 2023

Otgontsetseg Galbadrakh (born 25 January 1992) is a Mongolian-born Kazakhstani judoka. She represented her country Mongolia at the 2016 Summer Olympics, where she won the bronze medal in the women's 48 kg event.

== Personal life ==
Born in Ulaanbaatar, Mongolia, Otgontsetseg became a naturalized Kazakhstani citizen in 2015.
