= Aisha Gurbanli =

Azerbaijani judoka (born 1993)

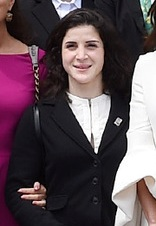

Personal information
- Nationality: Azerbaijani
- Born: 28 April 1993 (age 33)
- Occupation: Judoka

Sport
- Country: Azerbaijan
- Sport: Judo
- Weight class: –48 kg
Medal record
Women's judo
Representing Azerbaijan

Profile at external databases
- IJF: 5082
- JudoInside.com: 54411
- Updated on 7 November 2021

Aisha Gurbani (born 28 April 1993), also spelled Ayşə Qurbanlı, is an Azerbaijani judoka.

She represented Azerbaijan at the 2020 Summer Olympics. She competed in the women's 48 kg event, where she lost to Portugal's Katarina Costa in the 1/16 finals.
