= Maryna Cherniak =

Ukrainian judoka (born 1988)

Personal information
- Born: 26 March 1988 (age 38) Zaporizhia, Ukrainian SSR, Soviet Union
- Occupation: Judoka
- Height: 162 cm (5 ft 4 in)

Sport
- Country: Ukraine
- Sport: Judo
- Weight class: ‍–‍48 kg

Achievements and titles
- Olympic Games: R16 (2016)
- World Champ.: 5th (2015)
- European Champ.: (bronze) (2014, 2018)
Medal record
Women's judo
Representing Ukraine
European Championships
Bronze medal – third place	2014 Montpellier	‍–‍48 kg
Bronze medal – third place	2018 Tel Aviv	‍–‍48 kg
World Masters
Bronze medal – third place	2016 Guadalajara	‍–‍48 kg
IJF Grand Slam
Bronze medal – third place	2018 Paris	‍–‍48 kg
IJF Grand Prix
Gold medal – first place	2015 Tbilisi	‍–‍48 kg
Gold medal – first place	2018 The Hague	‍–‍48 kg
Silver medal – second place	2014 Tbilisi	‍–‍48 kg
Silver medal – second place	2014 Samsun	‍–‍48 kg
Silver medal – second place	2014 Jeju	‍–‍48 kg
Silver medal – second place	2017 Tbilisi	‍–‍48 kg
Silver medal – second place	2019 Tel Aviv	‍–‍48 kg
Bronze medal – third place	2013 Almaty	‍–‍48 kg
Bronze medal – third place	2013 Jeju	‍–‍48 kg
Bronze medal – third place	2016 Tbilisi	‍–‍48 kg
Bronze medal – third place	2016 Almaty	‍–‍48 kg
Bronze medal – third place	2018 Tunis	‍–‍48 kg
Bronze medal – third place	2019 Budapest	‍–‍48 kg
Bronze medal – third place	2019 Tashkent	‍–‍48 kg
European U23 Championships
Bronze medal – third place	2010 Sarajevo	‍–‍48 kg
Summer Universiade
Bronze medal – third place	2013 Kazan	‍–‍48 kg

Profile at external databases
- IJF: 2765
- JudoInside.com: 38630
- Updated on 21 May 2023

Maryna Mikolaevna Cherniak (Ukrainian: Марина Миколаївна Черняк, born 26 March 1988) is a Ukrainian judoka.

== Career ==
Her twin sister Inna Cherniak is visually impaired, but competes in judo and sambo both against sighted and visually impaired people. To avoid competing against each other the sisters often split the events. For example, at the 2013 World Championships, Inna competed in the 52 kg and Maryna in the 48 kg division. At the 2013 Summer Universiade, both sisters won medals in the 52 kg category, but Inna in sambo and Maryna in judo. In 2016, Inna won a gold medal in judo at the 2016 Summer Paralympics, while Maryna was eliminated in her second bout at the 2016 Summer Olympics.
