= 2025 World Judo Championships – Men's 100 kg =

Judo competition

Judo Men's 100 kg at the 2025 World Judo Championships
- Venue: László Papp Budapest Sports Arena
- Location: Budapest, Hungary
- Date: 18 June 2025
- Competitors: 42 from 36 nations
- Total prize money: €57,000

Medalists
gold medal	Matvey Kanikovskiy (1st title)
silver medal	Dota Arai	Japan
bronze medal	Zelym Kotsoiev	Azerbaijan
bronze medal	Arman Adamian

Competition at external databases
- Links: IJF • JudoInside

The 2025 World Judo Championships will be held at the László Papp Budapest Sports Arena in Budapest, Hungary on 18 June 2025.

== Results ==
=== Finals ===
Semi-finals
(International Judo Federation) Arman Adamian	000 (yellow card)
(International Judo Federation) Matvey Kanikovskiy	100
(Japan) Dota Arai	101
(South Korea) Kim Se-heon	000 (yellow card)

Final
(International Judo Federation) Matvey Kanikovskiy	020 (yellow card)
(Japan) Dota Arai	000

=== Repechage ===
Repechage
(Azerbaijan) Zelym Kotsoiev	110 (yellow card)
(Spain) Nikoloz Sherazadishvili	010
(Tajikistan) Dzhakhongir Madzhidov	000
(United Arab Emirates) Dzhafar Kostoev	001 (yellow card)

Bronze medal
(Azerbaijan) Zelym Kotsoiev	100
(South Korea) Kim Se-heon	000 (yellow card)
(United Arab Emirates) Dzhafar Kostoev	000
(International Judo Federation) Arman Adamian	020

=== Pool A ===
First round
(United States) Jared Causse	000
(Italy) Gennaro Pirelli	100
(Cuba) Zail Ramírez	010 (yellow card)
(Guinea) Abdoulaye Millimono	000 (yellow card)
(Colombia) Francisco Balanta	000
(Czech Republic) Martin Bezděk	001

Round of 32
(Azerbaijan) Zelym Kotsoiev	100
(Italy) Gennaro Pirelli	000 (yellow card)
(Cuba) Zail Ramírez	000
(Kazakhstan) Marat Baikamurov	110 (yellow card)
(International Judo Federation) Arman Adamian	001 (yellow card)
(Tajikistan) Karomatullo Khakimov	000
(Czech Republic) Martin Bezděk	000
(Egypt) Omar Elramly	100 (yellow card)

Round of 16
(Azerbaijan) Zelym Kotsoiev	100 (yellow card)
(Kazakhstan) Marat Baikamurov	000
(International Judo Federation) Arman Adamian	100
(Egypt) Omar Elramly	000

Quarter-finals
(Azerbaijan) Zelym Kotsoiev	010 (yellow card)
(International Judo Federation) Arman Adamian	020

=== Pool B ===
First round
~~(Israel) Iosif Simin~~
(Poland) Piotr Kuczera	w/o
(United Kingdom) Rhys Thompson	000
(Netherlands) Simeon Catharina	101

Round of 32
(Georgia (country)) Ilia Sulamanidze	002 (yellow card)
(Hungary) Zsombor Vég	000
(Poland) Piotr Kuczera	001
(Spain) Nikoloz Sherazadishvili	010 (yellow card)
(International Judo Federation) Matvey Kanikovskiy	112
(Netherlands) Simeon Catharina	000
(Canada) Kyle Reyes	100 (yellow card)
(Serbia) Bojan Došen	000

Round of 16
(Georgia (country)) Ilia Sulamanidze	000 (yellow card)
(Spain) Nikoloz Sherazadishvili	100 (yellow card)
(International Judo Federation) Matvey Kanikovskiy	001 (yellow card)
(Canada) Kyle Reyes	000

Quarter-finals
(Spain) Nikoloz Sherazadishvili	000 (yellow card)
(International Judo Federation) Matvey Kanikovskiy	100

=== Pool C ===
First round
(Bahrain) Said Sadrudinov	100 (yellow card)
(Austria) Laurin Boehler	000
(India) Avtar Singh	000
(Tunisia) Koussay Ben Ghares	101

Round of 32
(Japan) Dota Arai	010 (yellow card)
(Lebanon) Caramnob Sagaipov	000
(Bahrain) Said Sadrudinov	001
(Cyprus) Georgios Kroussaniotakis	000
(Tajikistan) Dzhakhongir Madzhidov	010 (yellow card)
(Tunisia) Koussay Ben Ghares	000
(Mongolia) Bayartsengeliin Khüderchuluun	100
(United Kingdom) Oliver Barratt	000

Round of 16
(Japan) Dota Arai	001
(Bahrain) Said Sadrudinov	000 (yellow card)
(Tajikistan) Dzhakhongir Madzhidov	100
(Mongolia) Bayartsengeliin Khüderchuluun	000 (yellow card)

Quarter-finals
(Japan) Dota Arai	101
(Tajikistan) Dzhakhongir Madzhidov	000

=== Pool D ===
First round
(Turkmenistan) Baýmyrat Majanow	000 (yellow card)
(Kazakhstan) Nurlykhan Sharkhan	020 (yellow card)
(Serbia) Aleksandar Kukolj	100
(Switzerland) Daniel Eich	000
(Portugal) Jorge Fonseca	100 (yellow card)
Khuslen Munkhuu	000

Round of 32
(Brazil) Leonardo Gonçalves	013
(Kazakhstan) Nurlykhan Sharkhan	000 (yellow card)
(Serbia) Aleksandar Kukolj	000
(South Korea) Kim Se-heon	001 (yellow card)
(United Arab Emirates) Dzhafar Kostoev	100 (yellow card)
(Portugal) Jorge Fonseca	000 (yellow card)
(Egypt) Abdalla Abdelsamea	000
(China) Huang Fuchun	100 (yellow card)

Round of 16
(Brazil) Leonardo Gonçalves	000 (yellow card)
(South Korea) Kim Se-heon	100
(United Arab Emirates) Dzhafar Kostoev	020
(China) Huang Fuchun	001

Quarter-finals
(South Korea) Kim Se-heon	100
(United Arab Emirates) Dzhafar Kostoev	001

== Prize money ==
The sums listed bring the total prizes awarded to €57,000 for the individual event.

Medal	Total	Judoka	Coach
Gold	€26,000	€20,800	€5,200
Silver	€15,000	€12,000	€3,000
Bronze	€8,000	€6,400	€1,600
