= 2024 European Judo Championships – Men's 100 kg =

Judo competition

Judo Men's 100 kg at the 2024 European Judo Championships
- Venue: Arena Zagreb
- Location: Zagreb, Croatia
- Date: 27 April
- Competitors: 31 from 23 nations

Medalists
gold medal	Matvey Kanikovskiy (1st title)
silver medal	Ilia Sulamanidze	Georgia
bronze medal	Michael Korrel	Netherlands
bronze medal	Gennaro Pirelli	Italy

Competition at external databases
- Links: IJF • JudoInside

The Men's 100 kg event at the 2024 European Judo Championships was held at the Arena Zagreb in Zagreb, Croatia on 27 April 2024.

== Results ==
=== Finals ===
Semi-finals
(Georgia (country)) Ilia Sulamanidze	02
(Croatia) Zlatko Kumrić	00
(Azerbaijan) Zelym Kotsoiev	01 (yellow card)
Matvey Kanikovskiy	02

Final
(Georgia (country)) Ilia Sulamanidze	00
Matvey Kanikovskiy	01 (yellow card)

=== Repechage ===
Repechage
(Hungary) Zsombor Vég	00 (yellow card)
(Netherlands) Michael Korrel	01
(Italy) Gennaro Pirelli	01 (yellow card)
(Serbia) Aleksandar Kukolj	00

Bronze medal
(Netherlands) Michael Korrel	01
(Azerbaijan) Zelym Kotsoiev	00
(Italy) Gennaro Pirelli	02 (yellow card)
(Croatia) Zlatko Kumrić	00 (yellow card)

=== Pool A ===
First round
(Germany) George Udsilauri	00
(Belgium) Toma Nikiforov	10
(Hungary) Zsombor Vég	01 (yellow card)
(Bulgaria) Daniel Dichev	00
(Ukraine) Danylo Hutsol	00
(Bosnia and Herzegovina) Nikola Pljevaljčić	10

Round of 16
(Georgia (country)) Ilia Sulamanidze	01 (yellow card)
(Belgium) Toma Nikiforov	00
(Hungary) Zsombor Vég	10
(Bosnia and Herzegovina) Nikola Pljevaljčić	00

Quarter-finals
(Georgia (country)) Ilia Sulamanidze	02
(Hungary) Zsombor Vég	00

=== Pool B ===
First round
(Netherlands) Michael Korrel	10 (yellow card)
(Poland) Piotr Kuczera	00
(Denmark) Mathias Madsen	00 (yellow card)
(Serbia) Bojan Došen	10 (yellow card)
Arman Adamian	01
(United Kingdom) Oliver Barratt	00 (yellow card)
(Croatia) Zlatko Kumrić	01
(Latvia) Maksims Duinovs	00

Round of 16
(Netherlands) Michael Korrel	10 (yellow card)
(Serbia) Bojan Došen	00 (yellow card)
Arman Adamian	00
(Croatia) Zlatko Kumrić	01

Quarter-finals
(Netherlands) Michael Korrel	00
(Croatia) Zlatko Kumrić	01

=== Pool C ===
First round
(Azerbaijan) Zelym Kotsoiev	11 (yellow card)
Adnan Khankan	00
(Croatia) Marko Kumrić	00
(Netherlands) Simeon Catharina	01
(Portugal) Jorge Fonseca	00
(Italy) Gennaro Pirelli	10 (yellow card)
(Ukraine) Anton Savytskiy	10 (yellow card)
(Malta) Isaac Bezzina	00

Round of 16
(Azerbaijan) Zelym Kotsoiev	10
(Netherlands) Simeon Catharina	00
(Italy) Gennaro Pirelli	10 (yellow card)
(Ukraine) Anton Savytskiy	00

Quarter-finals
(Azerbaijan) Zelym Kotsoiev	10
(Italy) Gennaro Pirelli	00

=== Pool D ===
First round
Matvey Kanikovskiy	01 (yellow card)
(Romania) Asley González	00
(Turkey) Mert Şişmanlar	00 (yellow card)
(Germany) Louis Mai	11
(Serbia) Aleksandar Kukolj	10 (yellow card)
(United Kingdom) Rhys Thompson	00 (yellow card)
(Austria) Laurin Boehler	00 (yellow card)
(Bulgaria) Boris Georgiev	01

Round of 16
Matvey Kanikovskiy	11
(Germany) Louis Mai	00
(Serbia) Aleksandar Kukolj	10 (yellow card)
(Bulgaria) Boris Georgiev	00 (yellow card)

Quarter-finals
Matvey Kanikovskiy	01
(Serbia) Aleksandar Kukolj	00
