= 2023 European Judo Championships – Men's 100 kg =

Judo competition

Judo Men's 100 kg at the 2023 European Judo Championships
- Venue: Sud de France Arena
- Location: Montpellier, France
- Date: 5 November 2023
- Competitors: 31 from 25 nations

Medalists
gold medal	Zelym Kotsoiev (1st title)	Azerbaijan
silver medal	Ilia Sulamanidze	Georgia
bronze medal	Matvey Kanikovskiy
bronze medal	Nikoloz Sherazadishvili	Spain

Competition at external databases
- Links: IJF • JudoInside

The men's 100 kg event at the 2023 European Judo Championships was held at the Sud de France Arena in Montpellier, France on 5 November 2023.

== Results ==
=== Finals ===
Semi-finals
(Georgia (country)) Ilia Sulamanidze	01 (yellow card)
(Israel) Peter Paltchik	00
(Azerbaijan) Zelym Kotsoiev	02
Matvey Kanikovskiy	00 (yellow card)

Final
(Georgia (country)) Ilia Sulamanidze	00
(Azerbaijan) Zelym Kotsoiev	10

=== Repechage ===
Repechage
(Austria) Aaron Fara	00
(Switzerland) Daniel Eich	02
(Spain) Nikoloz Sherazadishvili	11 (yellow card)
(Netherlands) Michael Korrel	00 (yellow card)

Bronze medal
(Switzerland) Daniel Eich	00 (yellow card)
Matvey Kanikovskiy	02
(Spain) Nikoloz Sherazadishvili	w/o
(Israel) Peter Paltchik	00

=== Pool A ===
First round
(Germany) Louis Mai	10
(Moldova) Iurie Mocanu	00
(Austria) Aaron Fara	10
(Hungary) Zsombor Vég	00 (yellow card)
Adnan Khankan	00
(Croatia) Marko Kumrić	11

Round of 16
(Georgia (country)) Ilia Sulamanidze	01 (yellow card)
(Germany) Louis Mai	00
(Austria) Aaron Fara	02
(Croatia) Marko Kumrić	00 (yellow card)

Quarter-finals
(Georgia (country)) Ilia Sulamanidze	02 (yellow card)
(Austria) Aaron Fara	00

=== Pool B ===
First round
(Israel) Peter Paltchik	10 (yellow card)
Daniel Mukete	00
(Ukraine) Anton Savytskiy	10
(Cyprus) Georgios Kroussaniotakis	00 (yellow card)
(Serbia) Aleksandar Kukolj	01 (yellow card)
(Netherlands) Simeon Catharina	00
(Switzerland) Daniel Eich	02
(Poland) Piotr Kuczera	00

Round of 16
(Israel) Peter Paltchik	10
(Ukraine) Anton Savytskiy	00
(Serbia) Aleksandar Kukolj	01 (yellow card)
(Switzerland) Daniel Eich	02

Quarter-finals
(Israel) Peter Paltchik	01 (yellow card)
(Switzerland) Daniel Eich	00

=== Pool C ===
First round
(Azerbaijan) Zelym Kotsoiev	02 (yellow card)
(United Kingdom) Harry Lovell-Hewitt	00
(Croatia) Zlatko Kumrić	02 (yellow card)
(Serbia) Bojan Došen	00
(Portugal) Jorge Fonseca	11
(Malta) Isaac Bezzina	00
(Spain) Nikoloz Sherazadishvili	10
(Denmark) Mathias Madsen	01

Round of 16
(Azerbaijan) Zelym Kotsoiev	10 (yellow card)
(Croatia) Zlatko Kumrić	00
(Portugal) Jorge Fonseca	00
(Spain) Nikoloz Sherazadishvili	10

Quarter-finals
(Azerbaijan) Zelym Kotsoiev	10
(Spain) Nikoloz Sherazadishvili	00

=== Pool D ===
First round
(Netherlands) Michael Korrel	10 (yellow card)
(France) Aurélien Diesse	00
(Turkey) Mert Şişmanlar	00
(Austria) Laurin Boehler	10 (yellow card)
Matvey Kanikovskiy	01 (yellow card)
(Bulgaria) Boris Georgiev	00
(Germany) George Udsilauri	00
(Belgium) Toma Nikiforov	10

Round of 16
(Netherlands) Michael Korrel	10
(Austria) Laurin Boehler	00 (yellow card)
Matvey Kanikovskiy	11
(Belgium) Toma Nikiforov	00

Quarter-finals
(Netherlands) Michael Korrel	00
Matvey Kanikovskiy	10 (yellow card)
