= 2026 World Judo Championships – Men's 100 kg =

Judo competition

Judo Men's 100 kg at the 2026 World Judo Championships
- Venue: National Gymnastics Arena
- Location: Baku, Azerbaijan
- Date: 9 October 2026
- Competitors: 56 from 46 nations
- Total prize money: €57,000

Medalists
gold medal	Ilia Sulamanidze (1st title)	Georgia
silver medal	Dota Arai	Japan
bronze medal	Niyaz Bilalov	Russia
bronze medal	Gennaro Pirelli	Italy

Competition at external databases
- Links: IJF

The men's 100 kg event at the 2026 World Judo Championships was held at the National Gymnastics Arena in Baku, Azerbaijan on 9 October 2026.

== Results ==
=== Finals ===
Semi-finals
(Italy) Gennaro Pirelli	000
(Georgia (country)) Ilia Sulamanidze	100
(Russia) Arman Adamian	000
(Japan) Dota Arai	110

Final
(Georgia (country)) Ilia Sulamanidze	001
(Japan) Dota Arai	000 (yellow card)

=== Repechage ===
Repechage
(Ukraine) Anton Savytskiy	000 (yellow card)
(Russia) Niyaz Bilalov	100 (yellow card)
(Uzbekistan) Tulkinbek Turdiev	001
(Netherlands) Simeon Catharina	000

Bronze medal
(Russia) Niyaz Bilalov	001 (yellow card)
(Russia) Arman Adamian	000 (yellow card)
(Uzbekistan) Tulkinbek Turdiev	000
(Italy) Gennaro Pirelli	001

=== Pool A ===
First round
(Cyprus) Georgios Kroussaniotakis	001 (yellow card)
(Switzerland) Daniel Eich	011
(Bahrain) Said Sadrudinov	000
(Spain) Nikoloz Sherazadishvili	100
(Brazil) Giovani Ferreira	000 (yellow card)
(Bulgaria) Boris Georgiev	001 (yellow card)
(Dominican Republic) Robert Florentino	100
(Chile) Thomas Briceño	000
(Serbia) Darko Brašnjović	001 (yellow card)
(South Korea) Han Ju-yeop	000
(Romania) Alexandru Sibișan	000
(Latvia) Maksims Duinovs	001

Round of 32
(Italy) Gennaro Pirelli	010
(Switzerland) Daniel Eich	000
(Spain) Nikoloz Sherazadishvili	001 (yellow card)
(Bulgaria) Boris Georgiev	000
(Ukraine) Anton Savytskiy	001
(Dominican Republic) Robert Florentino	000
(Serbia) Darko Brašnjović	100 (yellow card)
(Latvia) Maksims Duinovs	000

Round of 16
(Italy) Gennaro Pirelli	100
(Spain) Nikoloz Sherazadishvili	000 (yellow card)
(Ukraine) Anton Savytskiy	101
(Serbia) Darko Brašnjović	000

Quarter-finals
(Italy) Gennaro Pirelli	010 (yellow card)
(Ukraine) Anton Savytskiy	000

=== Pool B ===
First round
(The Gambia) Abdourahman Ceesay	000
(Australia) Axel Nightingale	100
(Egypt) Omar Elramly	000
(Netherlands) Michael Korrel	020
(United Kingdom) Oliver Barratt	000
(Uzbekistan) Ernazar Sarsenbaev	010
(Hungary) Zsombor Vég	100
(Tajikistan) Dzhakhongir Madzhidov	000 (yellow card)
(Poland) Piotr Kuczera	100
(Mongolia) Bayartsengeliin Khüderchuluun	000
(Moldova) Vadim Ghimbovschi	010
(Kosovo) Shpati Zekaj	000 (yellow card)

Round of 32
(Russia) Niyaz Bilalov	100
(Australia) Axel Nightingale	000
(Netherlands) Michael Korrel	010 (yellow card)
(Uzbekistan) Ernazar Sarsenbaev	000
(Georgia (country)) Ilia Sulamanidze	011 (yellow card)
(Hungary) Zsombor Vég	000
(Poland) Piotr Kuczera	000
(Moldova) Vadim Ghimbovschi	101

Round of 16
(Russia) Niyaz Bilalov	100 (yellow card)
(Netherlands) Michael Korrel	000
(Georgia (country)) Ilia Sulamanidze	001 (yellow card)
(Moldova) Vadim Ghimbovschi	000

Quarter-finals
(Russia) Niyaz Bilalov	000 (yellow card)
(Georgia (country)) Ilia Sulamanidze	101 (yellow card)

=== Pool C ===
First round
Khuslen Munkhuu	000
(United Arab Emirates) Dzhafar Kostoev	020
(Guinea) Tanou Mamadou Keita	101
(United Kingdom) Max Gregory	000
(Uzbekistan) Tulkinbek Turdiev	010 (yellow card)
(Slovenia) Gal Bertalanič Žižek	000
(Canada) Kyle Reyes	001 (yellow card)
(Portugal) Jorge Fonseca	000
(Azerbaijan) Zelym Kotsoiev	100
(Turkmenistan) Baýmyrat Majanow	000 (yellow card)
(Serbia) Milan Bulaja	000
(Slovakia) Benjamín Maťašeje	100 (yellow card)

Round of 32
(Brazil) Leonardo Gonçalves	010
(United Arab Emirates) Dzhafar Kostoev	001 (yellow card)
(Guinea) Tanou Mamadou Keita	000 (yellow card)
(Uzbekistan) Tulkinbek Turdiev	100
(Russia) Arman Adamian	100
(Canada) Kyle Reyes	000
(Azerbaijan) Zelym Kotsoiev	020 (yellow card)
(Slovakia) Benjamín Maťašeje	000

Round of 16
(Brazil) Leonardo Gonçalves	000
(Uzbekistan) Tulkinbek Turdiev	100 (yellow card)
(Russia) Arman Adamian	001 (yellow card)
(Azerbaijan) Zelym Kotsoiev	000

Quarter-finals
(Uzbekistan) Tulkinbek Turdiev	000
(Russia) Arman Adamian	001 (yellow card)

=== Pool D ===
First round
(Romania) Rareș Arsenie	100
(Lebanon) Caramnob Sagaipov	000
(Australia) Jack Rigby	000 (yellow card)
(Kyrgyzstan) Daut Poltushev	100
(Israel) Iosif Simin	100
(Colombia) Francisco Balanta	000
(Cameroon) Franck Ulrick Tahman Zan	000
(China) Huang Fuchun	021
(Argentina) Ivo Dargoltz	000
(South Korea) Kim Se-heon	020 (yellow card)
(Cyprus) Aristos Michael	000
(Cuba) Iván Felipe Silva Morales	110

Round of 32
(Netherlands) Simeon Catharina	110 (yellow card)
(Romania) Rareș Arsenie	000 (yellow card)
(Kyrgyzstan) Daut Poltushev	000
(Israel) Iosif Simin	110 (yellow card)
(Japan) Dota Arai	100
(China) Huang Fuchun	000
(South Korea) Kim Se-heon	000 (yellow card)
(Cuba) Iván Felipe Silva Morales	111 (yellow card)

Round of 16
(Netherlands) Simeon Catharina	001 (yellow card)
(Israel) Iosif Simin	000
(Japan) Dota Arai	110 (yellow card)
(Cuba) Iván Felipe Silva Morales	000

Quarter-finals
(Netherlands) Simeon Catharina	000 (yellow card)
(Japan) Dota Arai	100 (yellow card)

== Prize money ==
The sums listed bring the total prizes awarded to €57,000 for the individual event.

Medal	Total	Judoka	Coach
Gold	€26,000	€20,800	€5,200
Silver	€15,000	€12,000	€3,000
Bronze	€8,000	€6,400	€1,600
