= Dota Arai =

Japanese judoka (born 2005)

Personal information
- Native name: 新井 道大
- Born: 29 January 2005 (age 21) Fujimi, Saitama, Japan
- Occupation: Judoka

Sport
- Country: Japan
- Sport: Judo
- Weight class: ‍–‍100 kg

Achievements and titles
- World Champ.: (silver) (2025, 2026)
- Highest world ranking: 1^{st}
Medal record
Men's judo
Representing Japan
World Championships
Silver medal – second place	2025 Budapest	‍–‍100 kg
Silver medal – second place	2026 Baku	‍–‍100 kg
Bronze medal – third place	2024 Abu Dhabi	‍–‍100 kg
IJF Grand Slam
Gold medal – first place	2025 Baku	‍–‍100 kg
Gold medal – first place	2025 Astana	‍–‍100 kg
Gold medal – first place	2026 Paris	‍–‍100 kg
Silver medal – second place	2023 Tokyo	‍–‍100 kg
Silver medal – second place	2025 Tokyo	‍–‍100 kg
Bronze medal – third place	2024 Tashkent	‍–‍100 kg
Bronze medal – third place	2024 Tokyo	‍–‍100 kg
IJF Grand Prix
Silver medal – second place	2023 Almada	‍–‍100 kg
World Juniors Championships
Gold medal – first place	2023 Odivelas	‍–‍100 kg
Gold medal – first place	2023 Odivelas	Mixed team
World Cadets Championships
Bronze medal – third place	2022 Sarajevo	+90 kg

Profile at external databases
- IJF: 68758
- JudoInside.com: 151233
- Updated on 9 October 2026

Dota Arai (Japanese: 新井 道大, Hepburn: Arai Dota; born 29 January 2005) is a Japanese judoka. He competes in the men's 100 kg event and has won three medals at the World Judo Championships.

== Judo career ==
=== Early career ===
Arai began practicing judo at the age of seven at the Eibukan Arai Dojo, which was established by his grandfather. As a third-year student at Saitama Sakae Junior High School, he placed fifth in the 90 kg weight class at the National Junior High School Judo Championships, but won the team competition. He also won the Maruchan Cup.

As a second-year student at Saitama Sakae High School, Arai won the 100 kg class at the Inter-High School Championships and placed second at the All-Japan Junior Championships. As a third-year student, he won the Kinshu-ki Cup and won the Inter-High School Championships for the second consecutive year. He placed third in the over-90 kg class at the 2022 World Cadet Championships. He won the All-Japan Junior Championships, defeating Tenri University freshman Hirami Riku in the final.

=== 2023 ===
Arai placed second at the 2023 Grand Prix Almada, losing to world number one Ilia Sulamanidze of Georgia in the final.

In 2023, Arai went on to Tokai University, where he placed second in the championship tournament, but won the All Japan Junior Championship for the second consecutive year, defeating Hirami in the final. In the following World Junior Championships, he won all of his matches by ippon, including defeating Rustam Shorakhmatov of Uzbekistan with a ko-soto-gake in the final. He also won the team competition, but did not play in the semi-final against Brazil or the final against France, as his team had already won before he played. In the Kodokan Cup, he lost by disqualification to Park 24's Kosuke Mashiyama in the quarterfinals, finishing in seventh place. In the second round of the Grand Slam Tokyo, he defeated the world champion, Arman Adamian of Russia, who was competing as a neutral player, with an O-soto-gari technique, and then in the quarterfinals he defeated Michael Korrel of the Netherlands with a waza-ari technique. He defeated all the strong players and advanced to the finals, but lost to Matvey Kanikovskiy of Russia, also a neutral player, with a hikikomi-gaeshi technique early in the match and finished in second place. He was also selected as the best young player in 2023.

=== 2024- ===
In 2024, Arai competed for a spot on the Paris Olympic team at the Grand Slam Paris, but lost in the third round to Aleksandar Kukolj of Serbia with an armbar. He was not selected for the Paris Olympic team because his senior at university, Aaron Wolf of Park24, who was competing for the Olympic team, won the tournament. At Grand Slam Tashkent, he defeated Israel's Peter Paltchik by waza-ari in the second round, but lost to the world champion Muzaffarbek Turoboyev of Uzbekistan by combined waza-ari in the semifinals. In the third-place deciding match, he came from behind to win against Belgium's Toma Nikiforov by uchi-mata to finish in third place.

In his second year, Arai lost by disqualification to Park 24's Kosuke Masuyama in the weight class final, placing second. However, he was selected to represent Japan at the World Championships based on his performance. At the World Championships in May, he faced Canada's Shady El Nahas in the quarterfinals, taking the lead with waza-ari, but losing by combined waza, but then defeated former world champion Jorge Fonseca of Portugal by uchi-mata in the third-place deciding match to place third. He contributed to his team's victory by winning the final by ippon. He also won the weight class in the All Japan Student Judo Team Championships. At the Grand Slam Tokyo, Arai was defeated by Kanikovskiy in the semifinals by uranage and placed third. At the 2025 Grand Slam Baku, he defeated Brazil's Leonardo Gonçalves with a ko-soto-gari throw 10 seconds into the final, winning his first IJF World Judo Tour title.

In his third year, Arai won the weight class final by defeating Keiyo Gas's Masuchi Ryotaro with an uchi-mata throw. He was also selected to represent Japan at the World Championships. At the Grand Slam Astana, Arai won all of his matches by ippon, including a win over Switzerland's Daniel Eich with a combined technique in the final. At the World Championships in June, he made it to the final, where was defeated by Kanikovskiy with a combined technique and won the silver medal.
