= 2026 European Judo Championships – Men's 100 kg =

Judo competition

Judo Men's 100 kg at the 2026 European Judo Championships
- Venue: Olympic Palace
- Location: Tbilisi, Georgia
- Date: 19 April 2026
- Competitors: 32 from 22 nations

Medalists
gold medal	Gennaro Pirelli (1st title)	Italy
silver medal	Simeon Catharina	Netherlands
bronze medal	Arman Adamian	Russia
bronze medal	Ilia Sulamanidze	Georgia

Competition at external databases
- Links: IJF • JudoInside

The men's 100 kg event at the 2026 European Judo Championships was held at the Olympic Palace in Tbilisi, Georgia on 19 April 2026.

== Results ==
=== Finals ===
Semi-finals
(Azerbaijan) Zelym Kotsoiev	000
(Netherlands) Simeon Catharina	100
(Italy) Gennaro Pirelli	010 (yellow card)
(Russia) Niyaz Bilalov	000 (yellow card)

Final
(Netherlands) Simeon Catharina	000
(Italy) Gennaro Pirelli	100 (yellow card)

=== Repechage ===
Repechage
(Hungary) Zsombor Vég	000
(Russia) Arman Adamian	022
(Switzerland) Daniel Eich	000 (yellow card)
(Georgia (country)) Ilia Sulamanidze	100

Bronze medal
(Russia) Arman Adamian	010 (yellow card)
(Russia) Niyaz Bilalov	000 (yellow card)
(Georgia (country)) Ilia Sulamanidze	w/o
~~(Azerbaijan) Zelym Kotsoiev~~

=== Pool A ===
First round
(Azerbaijan) Zelym Kotsoiev	001 (yellow card)
(North Macedonia) Nikola Pavlovski	000
(Ukraine) Yaroslav Davydchuk	100
(Serbia) Milan Bulaja	000
(Hungary) Zsombor Vég	010
(Slovakia) Peter Žilka	000 (yellow card)
(Bulgaria) Boris Georgiev	001
(Belarus) Pankrat Surba	000 (yellow card)

Round of 16
(Azerbaijan) Zelym Kotsoiev	100
(Ukraine) Yaroslav Davydchuk	000
(Hungary) Zsombor Vég	011
(Bulgaria) Boris Georgiev	010

Quarter-finals
(Azerbaijan) Zelym Kotsoiev	020
(Hungary) Zsombor Vég	000

=== Pool B ===
First round
(Russia) Arman Adamian	020
(Estonia) Jakob Vares	000 (yellow card)
(Cyprus) Aristos Michael	100
(Latvia) Maksims Duinovs	000
(Netherlands) Simeon Catharina	100
(Poland) Michał Jędrzejewski	000
(Romania) Rareș Arsenie	020
(Montenegro) Aleksandar Tomić	000

Round of 16
(Russia) Arman Adamian	100 (yellow card)
(Cyprus) Aristos Michael	000
(Netherlands) Simeon Catharina	100 (yellow card)
(Romania) Rareș Arsenie	000 (yellow card)

Quarter-finals
(Russia) Arman Adamian	000
(Netherlands) Simeon Catharina	100

=== Pool C ===
First round
(Ukraine) Anton Savytskiy	000 (yellow card)
(Netherlands) Michael Korrel	010
(Switzerland) Daniel Eich	102
(Serbia) Darko Brašnjović	000
(Italy) Gennaro Pirelli	100
(Montenegro) Danilo Pantić	000
(Armenia) Gor Karapetyan	010 (yellow card)
(Poland) Piotr Kuczera	011

Round of 16
(Netherlands) Michael Korrel	000 (yellow card)
(Switzerland) Daniel Eich	100 (yellow card)
(Italy) Gennaro Pirelli	020
(Poland) Piotr Kuczera	000 (yellow card)

Quarter-finals
(Switzerland) Daniel Eich	000
(Italy) Gennaro Pirelli	001

=== Pool D ===
First round
(Georgia (country)) Ilia Sulamanidze	100
(United Kingdom) Oliver Barratt	000 (yellow card)
(Belarus) Yauheni Morau	001 (yellow card)
(Romania) Alexandru Sibișan	002
(Russia) Niyaz Bilalov	011
(Cyprus) Georgios Kroussaniotakis	000
(Israel) Iosif Simin	000
(Slovakia) Benjamín Maťašeje	001

Round of 16
(Georgia (country)) Ilia Sulamanidze	100
(Romania) Alexandru Sibișan	000
(Russia) Niyaz Bilalov	100
(Slovakia) Benjamín Maťašeje	000 (yellow card)

Quarter-finals
(Georgia (country)) Ilia Sulamanidze	000 (yellow card)
(Russia) Niyaz Bilalov	010 (yellow card)
