= 2025 European Judo Championships – Men's 100 kg =

Judo competition

Judo Men's 100 kg at the 2025 European Judo Championships
- Venue: Morača Sports Center
- Location: Podgorica, Montenegro
- Date: 26 April 2025
- Competitors: 28 from 22 nations

Medalists
gold medal	Ilia Sulamanidze (1st title)	Georgia
silver medal	Zelym Kotsoiev	Azerbaijan
bronze medal	Simeon Catharina	Netherlands
bronze medal	Gennaro Pirelli	Italy

Competition at external databases
- Links: IJF • JudoInside

The men's 100 kg competition at the 2025 European Judo Championships was held at the Morača Sports Center in Podgorica, Montenegro on 26 April 2025.

== Results ==
=== Finals ===
Semi-finals
(Azerbaijan) Zelym Kotsoiev	020
(Ukraine) Anton Savytskiy	001 (yellow card)
(Georgia (country)) Ilia Sulamanidze	010 (yellow card)
(International Judo Federation) Arman Adamian	000 (yellow card)

Final
(Azerbaijan) Zelym Kotsoiev	000 (yellow card)
(Georgia (country)) Ilia Sulamanidze	001 (yellow card)

=== Repechage ===
Repechage
(Latvia) Maksims Duinovs	000
(Netherlands) Simeon Catharina	100
(Italy) Gennaro Pirelli	100
(Netherlands) Michael Korrel	000

Bronze medal
(Netherlands) Simeon Catharina	010 (yellow card)
(International Judo Federation) Arman Adamian	000
(Italy) Gennaro Pirelli	001 (yellow card)
(Ukraine) Anton Savytskiy	000

=== Pool A ===
First round
(Greece) Symeon Georgiadis	000
(Cyprus) Aristos Michael	100
(Portugal) Jorge Fonseca	010 (yellow card)
(International Judo Federation) Niyaz Bilalov	000 (yellow card)
(Latvia) Maksims Duinovs	101 (yellow card)
(United Kingdom) Oliver Barratt	000

Round of 16
(Azerbaijan) Zelym Kotsoiev	100
(Cyprus) Aristos Michael	000 (yellow card)
(Portugal) Jorge Fonseca	000
(Latvia) Maksims Duinovs	001

Quarter-finals
(Azerbaijan) Zelym Kotsoiev	101
(Latvia) Maksims Duinovs	000

=== Pool B ===
First round
(Serbia) Bojan Došen	000 (yellow card)
(Austria) Adam Borchashvilli	100
(Switzerland) Daniel Eich	001 (yellow card)
(Germany) George Udsilauri	000
(Czech Republic) Martin Bezděk	001 (yellow card)
(Netherlands) Simeon Catharina	100

Round of 16
(Ukraine) Anton Savytskiy	100
(Austria) Adam Borchashvilli	000
(Switzerland) Daniel Eich	000 (yellow card)
(Netherlands) Simeon Catharina	001

Quarter-finals
(Ukraine) Anton Savytskiy	100 (yellow card)
(Netherlands) Simeon Catharina	000

=== Pool C ===
First round
(Serbia) Aleksandar Kukolj	100
(North Macedonia) Nikola Pavlovski	000 (yellow card)
(Italy) Gennaro Pirelli	100 (yellow card)
(Israel) Iosif Simin	000
(Cyprus) Georgios Kroussaniotakis	100 (yellow card)
(Slovakia) Benjamín Maťašeje	000

Round of 16
(Georgia (country)) Ilia Sulamanidze	011
(Serbia) Aleksandar Kukolj	000 (yellow card)
(Italy) Gennaro Pirelli	100 (yellow card)
(Cyprus) Georgios Kroussaniotakis	000

Quarter-finals
(Georgia (country)) Ilia Sulamanidze	001 (yellow card)
(Italy) Gennaro Pirelli	000

=== Pool D ===
First round
(Estonia) Jakob Vares	000
(Czech Republic) David Dudy	100 (yellow card)
(Netherlands) Michael Korrel	100
(Sweden) Karl Bååthe	000
(Bosnia and Herzegovina) Nikola Pljevaljčić	001
(United Kingdom) Max Gregory	101

Round of 16
(International Judo Federation) Arman Adamian	101
(Czech Republic) David Dudy	000
(Netherlands) Michael Korrel	100
(United Kingdom) Max Gregory	000

Quarter-finals
(International Judo Federation) Arman Adamian	011
(Netherlands) Michael Korrel	000 (yellow card)
