= Bilalov =

Bilalov (masculine, Russian: Билалов) or Bilalova (feminine, Russian: Билалова) is a Russian surname. Notable people with the surname include:

- Ilshat Bilalov (born 1985), Russian ice hockey player
- Niyaz Bilalov (born 1994), Russian judoka
- Zeynidin Bilalov, Azerbaijani Paralympic athlete
