= 2022 European Judo Championships – Men's 100 kg =

Judo Men's 100 kg at the 2022 European Judo Championships
- Venue: Armeets Arena
- Location: Sofia, Bulgaria
- Date: 1 May
- Competitors: 25 from 19 nations

Medalists
gold medal	Michael Korrel (1st title)	Netherlands
silver medal	Piotr Kuczera	Poland
bronze medal	Nikoloz Sherazadishvili	Spain
bronze medal	Daniel Eich	Switzerland

Competition at external databases
- Links: IJF • JudoInside

The men's 100 kg competition at the 2022 European Judo Championships was held on 1 May at the Armeets Arena.

== Results ==
=== Finals ===
Semi-finals
Piotr Kuczera (POL)	10
Daniel Eich (SUI)	00
Simeon Catharina (NED)	00
Michael Korrel (NED)	10

Final
Piotr Kuczera (POL)	00
Michael Korrel (NED)	10

=== Repechage ===
Repechage
Nikoloz Sherazadishvili (ESP)	10
Varlam Liparteliani (GEO)	00
Peter Paltchik (ISR)	00
Elmar Gasimov (AZE)	01

Bronze medal
Nikoloz Sherazadishvili (ESP)	01
Simeon Catharina (NED)	00
Elmar Gasimov (AZE)	00
Daniel Eich (SUI)	10

=== Pool A ===
First round
Grigori Minaškin (EST)	00
Piotr Kuczera (POL)	10
Asley González (ROU)	00
Nikoloz Sherazadishvili (ESP)	01
Panagiotis Papanikolaou (GRE)	00
Boris Georgiev (BUL)	10

Round of 16
Jorge Fonseca (POR)	01
Piotr Kuczera (POL)	10
Nikoloz Sherazadishvili (ESP)	10
Boris Georgiev (BUL)	00

Quarterfinals
Piotr Kuczera (POL)	01
Nikoloz Sherazadishvili (ESP)	00

=== Pool B ===
First round
Mathias Madsen (DEN)	00
Karl-Richard Frey (GER)	01
Daniel Eich (SUI)	10
Marko Kumrić (CRO)	00

Round of 16
Varlam Liparteliani (GEO)	11
Karl-Richard Frey (GER)	00
Aleksandar Kukolj (SRB)	00
Daniel Eich (SUI)	10

Quarterfinals
Varlam Liparteliani (GEO)	00
Daniel Eich (SUI)	01

=== Pool C ===
First round
Zlatko Kumrić (CRO)	11
Zsombor Vég (HUN)	00
Rhys Thompson (GBR)	10
Bojan Došen (SRB)	00

Round of 16
Peter Paltchik (ISR)	11
Zlatko Kumrić (CRO)	01
Simeon Catharina (NED)	10
Rhys Thompson (GBR)	01

Quarterfinals
Peter Paltchik (ISR)	00
Simeon Catharina (NED)	10

=== Pool D ===
First round
Elmar Gasimov (AZE)	10
Cédric Olivar (FRA)	00
Kostadin Tsvetanov (BUL)	00
Falk Petersilka (GER)	10

Round of 16
Ilia Sulamanidze (GEO)	00
Elmar Gasimov (AZE)	10
Michael Korrel (NED)	01
Falk Petersilka (GER)	00

Quarterfinals
Elmar Gasimov (AZE)	00
Michael Korrel (NED)	10
