= Adnan Khankan =

Syrian judoka

Personal information
- Born: 1 May 1994 (age 32)
- Occupation: Judoka

Sport
- Country: Syria
- Sport: Judo
- Weight class: ‍–‍100 kg

Achievements and titles
- Olympic Games: R32 (2024)
- World Champ.: R32 (2023)
- Regional finals: R32 (2014, 2015, 2023, 2024)
Medal record
Men's judo
Representing Syria
Asian Junior Championships
| Bronze medal – third place | 2011 Beirut | ‍–‍90 kg |

Profile at external databases
- IJF: 17217
- JudoInside.com: 81113
- Updated on 16 November 2025

Adnan Khankan (born 1 May 1994) is a Syrian judoka. Originally from the Syrian capital Damascus, Khankan fled to Cologne, Germany, in 2015 in order to avoid conscription into Bashar al-Assad's army during the Syrian civil war. He participated in the 2024 Summer Olympics as a member of the refugee team, whom he cited as an inspiration upon seeing the first edition of the team at the 2016 Summer Olympics. In the men's 100 kg judo event, Khankan lost to Daniel Eich of Switzerland.
