= Judo at the 2024 Summer Olympics – Men's 100 kg =

Judo Men's 100 kg at the Games of the XXXIII Olympiad
- Venue: Grand Palais Éphémère
- Location: Paris, France
- Date: 1 August 2024
- Competitors: 25 from 25 nations
- Website: Official website

Medalists
gold medal	Zelym Kotsoiev (1st title)	Azerbaijan
silver medal	Ilia Sulamanidze	Georgia
bronze medal	Peter Paltchik	Israel
bronze medal	Muzaffarbek Turoboyev	Uzbekistan

Competition at external databases
- Links: IJF • JudoInside

The men's 100 kg (half-heavyweight) competition in judo at the 2024 Summer Olympics was held on 1 August 2024 at the Grand Palais Éphémère in Paris, France. The event was contested by 25 competitors from 25 nations. Zelym Kotsoiev of Azerbaijan won the gold medal after defeating Ilia Sulamanidze of Georgia in the final. Peter Paltchik of Israel and Muzaffarbek Turoboyev of Uzbekistan won the bronze medals.

== Background ==
Judo was introduced as an Olympic sport at the 1964 Summer Olympics in Tokyo, Japan. After not being included in the 1968 Summer Olympics, it returned for the 1972 edition, and has been part of the Summer Olympic programme ever since. The men's 90 kg category was one of seven weight categories in the men's judo event at the 2024 Summer Olympics.

Japan's Aaron Wolf was the defending Olympic champion, having won the gold medal in the same category at the 2020 Summer Olympics in Tokyo. South Korea's Cho Gu-ham won the silver medal, while Portugal's Jorge Fonseca and the Russian Olympic Committee's Niyaz Ilyasov won the bronze medals. Of the medalists from the previous edition, only Wolf and Fonseca returned to compete in the 2024 edition.

Azerbaijan's Zelym Kotsoiev was the reigning world champion, having won the gold medal at the 2024 World Judo Championships in Abu Dhabi, United Arab Emirates, in May 2024. He defeated Canada's Shady Elnahas in the final, while Spain's Nikoloz Sherazadishvili won a bronze medal. Kotsoiev had previously won the bronze medal at the 2022 and 2023 World Judo Championships. Uzbekistan's Muzaffarbek Turoboyev was the gold medalist at the 2022 World Judo Championships in Tashkent, while Netherlands' Michael Korrel and Kotsoiev won the bronze medals in the competition. Turoboyev was had also won the gold medal at the 2022 Asian Games and 2024 Asian Judo Championships.

Georgia's Ilia Sulamanidze was the world number one coming into the event. He is a bronze medalist at the 2021 World Judo Championships, and had won silver medals at the 2023 and 2024 European Judo Championships. He had also won the gold medal at the 2022 Judo World Masters in Jerusalem. Israel's Peter Paltchik had won the bronze medal at the 2023 World Judo Championships alongside Kotsoiev. He had also won the silver medal at the 2023 Hungary Masters.

== Format ==
The individual judo competition was competed as a single-elimination tournament. The competitors were divided into two halves with the winner of each match advancing to the next match. The winners of the semifinals of the two halves competed against each other for the gold and silver medals. Each judoka who loses to one of the two finalists moves into the repechage rounds, which is used to determine the bronze medals. The losers of the semifinals compete against the remaining repechage opponent from their half of the bracket in the bronze medal bout. The outcome of each match is determined by the score with points given to various techniques such as ippon, waza-ari, and yuko, and penalties.

== Schedule ==
The men's 90 kg judo event was held on 31 July 2024 at the Grand Palais Éphémère in Paris, France.

All times are Central European Summer Time (UTC+02:00)

Date	Time	Event
Thursday, 1 August 2024	10:00	Round 1
Thursday, 1 August 2024	10:00	Elimination round of 16
Thursday, 1 August 2024	10:00	Quarterfinals
Thursday, 1 August 2024	14:00	Repechage
Thursday, 1 August 2024	14:00	Semifinals
Thursday, 1 August 2024	14:00	Bronze medal matches
Thursday, 1 August 2024	14:00	Final

== Summary ==
The competition featured 25 judoka representing 25 nations.

Kotsoiev, the top seed, received a bye in the first round and defeated Poland's Piotr Kuczera in the round of 16 by ippon. He defeated Paltchik in the quarterfinals and Turoboyev in the semifinals by by a waza-ari. Sulamanidze defeated Italy's Gennaro Pirelli by ippon in the round of 16. In the quarterfinals, he defeated defending champion Wolf by a waza-ari. In the semifinals, he overcame Switzerland's Daniel Eich by ippon to set up a final with Kotsoiev.

In the final, Sulamanidze received the first score by waza-ari through utsuri goshi within the first minute. Kotsoiev received two shido penalties, while Sulamanidze himself received a shido in between for a false attack. However, entering the final 15 seconds of the contest, Sulamanidze received two quick shido penalties for grip avoidance, which resulted in a hansoku-make and victory for Kotsoiev by ippon.

In the first bronze-medal contest between Paltchik and Eich, Paltchik won by a waza-ari. In the other bronze-medal contest, Turoboyev faced Sherazadishvili. Turoboyev scored a waza-ari with an uchi mata at 1 minute and 37 seconds before completing the win with a soto makikomi at 1 minute and 53 seconds.

== Results ==
=== Finals ===
Semi-finals
Zelym Kotsoiev (AZE)	01 (yellow card)
Muzaffarbek Turoboyev (UZB)	00
Ilia Sulamanidze (GEO)	10
Daniel Eich (SUI)	00

Final
Zelym Kotsoiev (AZE)	10
Ilia Sulamanidze (GEO)	01

=== Repechage ===
Repechage
Peter Paltchik (ISR)	10 (yellow card)
Michael Korrel (NED)	00
Aaron Wolf (JPN)	00 (yellow card)
Nikoloz Sherazadishvili (ESP)	10 (yellow card)

Bronze medal
Peter Paltchik (ISR)	01
Daniel Eich (SUI)	00 (yellow card)
Nikoloz Sherazadishvili (ESP)	00 (yellow card)
Muzaffarbek Turoboyev (UZB)	10

=== Pool A ===
First round
Piotr Kuczera (POL)	10
Thomas Briceño (CHI)	00
Batkhuyagiin Gonchigsüren (MGL)	00 (yellow card)
Peter Paltchik (ISR)	10
Aurélien Diesse (FRA)	10
Dzhakhongir Madzhidov (TJK)	00

Round of 16
Zelym Kotsoiev (AZE)	10
Piotr Kuczera (POL)	00 (yellow card)
Peter Paltchik (ISR)	10
Aurélien Diesse (FRA)	00

Quarter-finals
Zelym Kotsoiev (AZE)	01
Peter Paltchik (ISR)	00

=== Pool B ===
First round
Nurlykhan Sharkhan (KAZ)	10 (yellow card)
Toma Nikiforov (BEL)	00
Dzhafar Kostoev (UAE)	10 (yellow card)
Leonardo Gonçalves (BRA)	01 (yellow card)

Round of 16
Muzaffarbek Turoboyev (UZB)	11
Nurlykhan Sharkhan (KAZ)	01
Michael Korrel (NED)	01
Dzhafar Kostoev (UAE)	00

Quarter-finals
Muzaffarbek Turoboyev (UZB)	11
Michael Korrel (NED)	00

=== Pool C ===
First round
Zlatko Kumrić (CRO)	00
Gennaro Pirelli (ITA)	10
Aaron Fara (AUT)	00
Aaron Wolf (JPN)	10 (yellow card)

Round of 16
Ilia Sulamanidze (GEO)	10 (yellow card)
Gennaro Pirelli (ITA)	00
Jorge Fonseca (POR)	00
Aaron Wolf (JPN)	10 (yellow card)

Quarter-finals
Ilia Sulamanidze (GEO)	01 (yellow card)
Aaron Wolf (JPN)	00

=== Pool D ===
First round
Daniel Eich (SUI)	10
Adnan Khankan (EOR)	00
Zsombor Vég (HUN)	01
Aleksandar Kukolj (SRB)	00 (yellow card)

Round of 16
Shady Elnahas (CAN)	00
Daniel Eich (SUI)	01
Nikoloz Sherazadishvili (ESP)	10 (yellow card)
Zsombor Vég (HUN)	01 (yellow card)

Quarter-finals
Daniel Eich (SUI)	01
Nikoloz Sherazadishvili (ESP)	00 (yellow card)
