= 2023 Judo Grand Slam Baku =

Judo Competition

Judo 2023 Judo Grand Slam Baku
- Venue: National Gymnastics Arena
- Location: Baku, Azerbaijan
- Dates: 22–24 September 2023
- Competitors: 446 from 61 nations
- Total prize money: €154,000

Competition at external databases
- Links: IJF • EJU • JudoInside

The 2023 Judo Grand Slam Baku is a Judo Grand Slam tournament that was held at the National Gymnastics Arena in Baku, Azerbaijan, from 22 to 24 September 2023 as part of the IJF World Tour and during the 2024 Summer Olympics qualification period.

== Medal summary ==
=== Men's events ===
Event	Gold	Silver	Bronze
Extra-lightweight (−60 kg)	Ramazan Abdulaev (AIN)	Gamzat Zairbekov (AIN)	Romain Valadier-Picard (FRA)
Extra-lightweight (−60 kg)	Ramazan Abdulaev (AIN)	Gamzat Zairbekov (AIN)	Kim Won-jin (KOR)
Half-lightweight (−66 kg)	Yashar Najafov (AZE)	Takeshi Takeoka (JPN)	Denis Vieru (MDA)
Half-lightweight (−66 kg)	Yashar Najafov (AZE)	Takeshi Takeoka (JPN)	David García Torné (ESP)
Lightweight (−73 kg)	Hidayat Heydarov (AZE)	Petru Pelivan (MDA)	Shakhram Ahadov (UZB)
Lightweight (−73 kg)	Hidayat Heydarov (AZE)	Petru Pelivan (MDA)	Makhmadbek Makhmadbekov (AIN)
Half-middleweight (−81 kg)	Zelim Tckaev (AZE)	Shamil Borchashvili (AUT)	Antonio Esposito (ITA)
Half-middleweight (−81 kg)	Zelim Tckaev (AZE)	Shamil Borchashvili (AUT)	Kenya Kohara (JPN)
Middleweight (−90 kg)	Mikhail Igolnikov (AIN)	Ivaylo Ivanov (BUL)	Mihael Žgank (TUR)
Middleweight (−90 kg)	Mikhail Igolnikov (AIN)	Ivaylo Ivanov (BUL)	Krisztián Tóth (HUN)
Half-heavyweight (−100 kg)	Ilia Sulamanidze (GEO)	Matvey Kanikovskiy (AIN)	Zelym Kotsoiev (AZE)
Half-heavyweight (−100 kg)	Ilia Sulamanidze (GEO)	Matvey Kanikovskiy (AIN)	Aurélien Diesse (FRA)
Heavyweight (+100 kg)	Inal Tasoev (AIN)	Guram Tushishvili (GEO)	Yerassyl Kazhibayev (KAZ)
Heavyweight (+100 kg)	Inal Tasoev (AIN)	Guram Tushishvili (GEO)	Tamerlan Bashaev (AIN)

=== Women's events ===
Event	Gold	Silver	Bronze
Extra-lightweight (−48 kg)	Assunta Scutto (ITA)	Leyla Aliyeva (AZE)	Sabina Giliazova (AIN)
Extra-lightweight (−48 kg)	Assunta Scutto (ITA)	Leyla Aliyeva (AZE)	Shirine Boukli (FRA)
Half-lightweight (−52 kg)	Kisumi Omori (JPN)	Distria Krasniqi (KOS)	Odette Giuffrida (ITA)
Half-lightweight (−52 kg)	Kisumi Omori (JPN)	Distria Krasniqi (KOS)	Réka Pupp (HUN)
Lightweight (−57 kg)	Nora Gjakova (KOS)	Eteri Liparteliani (GEO)	Priscilla Gneto (FRA)
Lightweight (−57 kg)	Nora Gjakova (KOS)	Eteri Liparteliani (GEO)	Timna Nelson-Levy (ISR)
Half-middleweight (−63 kg)	Angelika Szymańska (POL)	Szofi Özbas (HUN)	Gili Sharir (ISR)
Half-middleweight (−63 kg)	Angelika Szymańska (POL)	Szofi Özbas (HUN)	Katharina Haecker (AUS)
Middleweight (−70 kg)	Elisavet Teltsidou (GRE)	Ai Tsunoda (ESP)	Marie-Ève Gahié (FRA)
Middleweight (−70 kg)	Elisavet Teltsidou (GRE)	Ai Tsunoda (ESP)	Barbara Matić (CRO)
Half-heavyweight (−78 kg)	Anna-Maria Wagner (GER)	Alice Bellandi (ITA)	Mayra Aguiar (BRA)
Half-heavyweight (−78 kg)	Anna-Maria Wagner (GER)	Alice Bellandi (ITA)	Mami Umeki (JPN)
Heavyweight (+78 kg)	Beatriz Souza (BRA)	Rochele Nunes (POR)	Raz Hershko (ISR)
Heavyweight (+78 kg)	Beatriz Souza (BRA)	Rochele Nunes (POR)	Larisa Cerić (BIH)

=== Medal table ===
* Host nation (Azerbaijan)

Rank	Nation	Gold	Silver	Bronze	Total
–	Individual Neutral Athletes (AIN)	3	2	3	8
1	Azerbaijan (AZE)*	3	1	1	5
2	Georgia (GEO)	1	2	0	3
3	Italy (ITA)	1	1	2	4
3	Japan (JPN)	1	1	2	4
5	Kosovo (KOS)	1	1	0	2
6	Brazil (BRA)	1	0	1	2
7	Germany (GER)	1	0	0	1
7	Greece (GRE)	1	0	0	1
7	Poland (POL)	1	0	0	1
10	Hungary (HUN)	0	1	2	3
11	Moldova (MDA)	0	1	1	2
11	Spain (ESP)	0	1	1	2
13	Austria (AUT)	0	1	0	1
13	Bulgaria (BUL)	0	1	0	1
13	Portugal (POR)	0	1	0	1
16	France (FRA)	0	0	5	5
17	Israel (ISR)	0	0	3	3
18	Australia (AUS)	0	0	1	1
18	Bosnia and Herzegovina (BIH)	0	0	1	1
18	Croatia (CRO)	0	0	1	1
18	Kazakhstan (KAZ)	0	0	1	1
18	South Korea (KOR)	0	0	1	1
18	Turkey (TUR)	0	0	1	1
18	Uzbekistan (UZB)	0	0	1	1
Totals (24 entries)		14	14	28	56

== Prize money ==
The sums written are per medalist, bringing the total prizes awarded to €154,000. (retrieved from:)

Medal	Total	Judoka	Coach
Gold	€5,000	€4,000	€1,000
Silver	€3,000	€2,400	€600
Bronze	€1,500	€1,200	€300
