= Harry Lovell-Hewitt =

British judoka

Personal information
- Nationality: British (English)
- Born: 25 January 1998 (age 28) Gloucester, Gloucestershire
- Occupation: Judoka

Sport
- Country: Great Britain
- Sport: Judo
- Weight class: ‍–‍100 kg
- Club: Stroud Judo Club

Achievements and titles
- World Champ.: R32 (2023)
- European Champ.: R32 (2023)
- Commonwealth Games: (bronze) (2022)
Medal record
Men's judo
Representing England
Commonwealth Games
Bronze medal – third place	2022 Birmingham	‍–‍100 kg

Profile at external databases
- IJF: 20988
- JudoInside.com: 81848
- Updated on 11 February 2023

Harry Lovell-Hewitt (born 25 January 1998 in Gloucester) is an English international judoka. He has represented England at the Commonwealth Games and won a bronze medal and is a three time British champion.

== Biography ==
Raised in Stroud, Lovell-Hewitt attended Rodborough primary school and then later Archway secondary school, splitting his free time between training for judo and rugby. He was taught judo at a young age by his coach Richard Neale. He is the great-grandson of William Lovell-Hewitt, former minor counties cricket player and captain for Wiltshire. Harry also represented Team GB at the youth Olympic festival in Tbilisi in 2015 where he placed 7th. Following on from that in his U21 age category he managed to secure four junior medals, including Gold at the Danish Open, silver in both Portugal and Lithuania. He won Gold at the 2018 Italian European Cup. Lovell-Hewitt won silver and bronze medals at the European Open in 2019 and 2021. In 2023, he won 2 silver European open medals in Rome and Sofia and then went on to represent Great Britain at the 2023 World Judo Championships in Qatar.

In 2022, he was selected for the 2022 Commonwealth Games in Birmingham where he competed in the men's 100 kg, winning the bronze medal after defeating Australian representative in the -100 kg. He won the 2023 –100 kg title at the British Judo Championships.
