= Matvey Kanikovskiy =

Russian judoka (born 2001)

Personal information
- Native name: Матвей Геннадиевич Каниковский
- Full name: Matvey Gennadievich Kanikovskiy
- Born: 11 November 2001 (age 24) Moscow, Russia
- Occupation: Judoka
- Height: 193 cm (6 ft 4 in)

Sport
- Country: Russia
- Sport: Judo
- Weight class: ‍–‍100 kg
- Club: Sambo-70 (Moscow)

Achievements and titles
- World Champ.: (gold) (2025)
- European Champ.: (gold) (2024)
- Highest world ranking: 1^{st}
Medal record
Men's judo
Representing the IJF
World Championships
Gold medal – first place	2025 Budapest	‍–‍100 kg
IJF Grand Slam
Gold medal – first place	2022 Ulaanbaatar	‍–‍100 kg
Gold medal – first place	2024 Tokyo	‍–‍100 kg
Gold medal – first place	2025 Tashkent	‍–‍100 kg
Representing Individual Neutral Athletes
European Championships
Gold medal – first place	2024 Zagreb	‍–‍100 kg
Bronze medal – third place	2023 Montpellier	‍–‍100 kg
IJF Grand Slam
Gold medal – first place	2023 Astana	‍–‍100 kg
Gold medal – first place	2023 Tokyo	‍–‍100 kg
Silver medal – second place	2023 Baku	‍–‍100 kg
Silver medal – second place	2024 Tashkent	‍–‍100 kg
IJF Grand Prix
Gold medal – first place	2023 Dushanbe	‍–‍100 kg
Gold medal – first place	2024 Odivelas	‍–‍100 kg
Representing Russia
IJF Grand Slam
Silver medal – second place	2021 Abu Dhabi	‍–‍100 kg
Bronze medal – third place	2025 Tokyo	‍–‍100 kg
World Juniors Championships
Bronze medal – third place	2021 Olbia	‍–‍100 kg
European Junior Championships
Gold medal – first place	2021 Luxembourg	‍–‍100 kg
European Cadet Championships
Gold medal – first place	2018 Sarajevo	‍–‍90 kg

Profile at external databases
- IJF: 43175
- JudoInside.com: 121400
- Updated on 11 December 2025

Matvey Gennadievich Kanikovskiy (Russian: Матвей Геннадиевич Каниковский, born 11 November 2001) is a Russian judoka and sambist. He is the 2025 World champion, the 2024 European champion and the 2022 Russian national champion.

== Background ==
Kanikovskiy was born in Moscow, Russia. He started judo and sambo at the age of 5. in Sambo-70 club. As of November 2024, Kanikovskiy is ranked sixth in the world in the -100 kg category by the International Judo Federation.

== Career ==
In 2021, Kanikovskiy claimed the junior European title in Luxembourg. He was runner-up at the Grand Slam Abu Dhabi.

In 2022, he won the senior Russian national championships held in Yekaterinburg at 100 kg and earned the gold medal at the grand slam Ulaanbaatar.

In 2023, Matvey won the grand prix in Dushanbe, Tajikistan, two grand slam tournaments in Astana, Kazakhstan and Tokyo, Japan and came third at the European Championships.

In 2024, he won the grand prix Odivelas, in the final match over 2x world champion Nikoloz Sherazadishvili of Spain. In March 2024, he was a finalist at the Grand Slam Tashkent. In April 2024, he won the European championships. In March 2025, he won the Grand Slam in Tashkent. In the final match, he beat his countryman Adam Sangariev.

== Achievements ==
Year	Tournament	Place	Weight class
2023	European Championships	3rd	−100 kg
2024	European Championships	1st	−100 kg
2025	World Championships	1st	−100 kg
