= 2023 Judo Grand Slam Astana =

Judo competition held in 2023

Judo 2023 Judo Grand Slam Astana
- Venue: Barys Arena
- Location: Astana, Kazakhstan
- Dates: 16–18 June 2023
- Competitors: 342 from 43 nations
- Total prize money: €154,000

Competition at external databases
- Links: IJF • EJU • JudoInside

The 2023 Judo Grand Slam Astana is a judo competition of the Grand Slam series that was held at the Barys Arena in Astana, Kazakhstan from 16 to 18 June 2023 as part of the IJF World Tour and during the 2024 Summer Olympics qualification period.

== Medal summary ==
=== Men's events ===
Event	Gold	Silver	Bronze
Extra-lightweight (−60 kg)	Magzhan Shamshadin (KAZ)	Cédric Revol (FRA)	Tornike Tsjakadoea (NED)
Extra-lightweight (−60 kg)	Magzhan Shamshadin (KAZ)	Cédric Revol (FRA)	Doston Ruziev (UZB)
Half-lightweight (−66 kg)	David García Torné (ESP)	Gusman Kyrgyzbayev (KAZ)	Maxime Gobert (FRA)
Half-lightweight (−66 kg)	David García Torné (ESP)	Gusman Kyrgyzbayev (KAZ)	Alberto Gaitero (ESP)
Lightweight (−73 kg)	Makhmadbek Makhmadbekov (AIN)	Adam Stodolski (POL)	Daniyar Shamshayev (KAZ)
Lightweight (−73 kg)	Makhmadbek Makhmadbekov (AIN)	Adam Stodolski (POL)	Askar Narkulov (KAZ)
Half-middleweight (−81 kg)	Somon Makhmadbekov (TJK)	Guilherme Schimidt (BRA)	José María Mendiola (ESP)
Half-middleweight (−81 kg)	Somon Makhmadbekov (TJK)	Guilherme Schimidt (BRA)	Dominic Ressel (GER)
Middleweight (−90 kg)	Tristani Mosakhlishvili (ESP)	Maxime-Gaël Ngayap Hambou (FRA)	Axel Clerget (FRA)
Middleweight (−90 kg)	Tristani Mosakhlishvili (ESP)	Maxime-Gaël Ngayap Hambou (FRA)	Theodoros Tselidis (GRE)
Half-heavyweight (−100 kg)	Matvey Kanikovskiy (AIN)	Dzhafar Kostoev (UAE)	Islam Bozbayev (KAZ)
Half-heavyweight (−100 kg)	Matvey Kanikovskiy (AIN)	Dzhafar Kostoev (UAE)	Zlatko Kumrić (CRO)
Heavyweight (+100 kg)	Tamerlan Bashaev (AIN)	Temur Rakhimov (TJK)	Valeriy Endovitskiy (AIN)
Heavyweight (+100 kg)	Tamerlan Bashaev (AIN)	Temur Rakhimov (TJK)	Galymzhan Krikbay (KAZ)

=== Women's events ===
Event	Gold	Silver	Bronze
Extra-lightweight (−48 kg)	Assunta Scutto (ITA)	Laura Martínez (ESP)	Khalimajon Kurbonova (UZB)
Extra-lightweight (−48 kg)	Assunta Scutto (ITA)	Laura Martínez (ESP)	Kristina Dudina (AIN)
Half-lightweight (−52 kg)	Odette Giuffrida (ITA)	Ryūko Takeda (JPN)	Gultaj Mammadaliyeva (AZE)
Half-lightweight (−52 kg)	Odette Giuffrida (ITA)	Ryūko Takeda (JPN)	Sita Kadamboeva (UZB)
Lightweight (−57 kg)	Sarah-Léonie Cysique (FRA)	Nora Gjakova (KOS)	Julie Beurskens (NED)
Lightweight (−57 kg)	Sarah-Léonie Cysique (FRA)	Nora Gjakova (KOS)	Cai Qi (CHN)
Half-middleweight (−63 kg)	Kim Ji-su (KOR)	Katharina Haecker (AUS)	Joanne van Lieshout (NED)
Half-middleweight (−63 kg)	Kim Ji-su (KOR)	Katharina Haecker (AUS)	Laura Fazliu (KOS)
Middleweight (−70 kg)	Elisavet Teltsidou (GRE)	Sanne van Dijke (NED)	Aoife Coughlan (AUS)
Middleweight (−70 kg)	Elisavet Teltsidou (GRE)	Sanne van Dijke (NED)	Kim Polling (NED)
Half-heavyweight (−78 kg)	Mao Izumi (JPN)	Patrícia Sampaio (POR)	Madeleine Malonga (FRA)
Half-heavyweight (−78 kg)	Mao Izumi (JPN)	Patrícia Sampaio (POR)	Fanny Estelle Posvite (FRA)
Heavyweight (+78 kg)	Xu Shiyan (CHN)	Marit Kamps (NED)	Su Xin (CHN)
Heavyweight (+78 kg)	Xu Shiyan (CHN)	Marit Kamps (NED)	Akerke Ramazanova (KAZ)

Source Results

=== Medal table ===
* Host nation (Kazakhstan)

Rank	Nation	Gold	Silver	Bronze	Total
–	Individual Neutral Athletes	3	0	2	5
1	Spain (ESP)	2	1	2	5
2	Italy (ITA)	2	0	0	2
3	France (FRA)	1	2	4	7
4	Kazakhstan (KAZ)*	1	1	5	7
5	Japan (JPN)	1	1	0	2
5	Tajikistan (TJK)	1	1	0	2
7	China (CHN)	1	0	2	3
8	Greece (GRE)	1	0	1	2
9	South Korea (KOR)	1	0	0	1
10	Netherlands (NED)	0	2	4	6
11	Australia (AUS)	0	1	1	2
11	Kosovo (KOS)	0	1	1	2
13	Brazil (BRA)	0	1	0	1
13	Poland (POL)	0	1	0	1
13	Portugal (POR)	0	1	0	1
13	United Arab Emirates (UAE)	0	1	0	1
17	Uzbekistan (UZB)	0	0	3	3
18	Azerbaijan (AZE)	0	0	1	1
18	Croatia (CRO)	0	0	1	1
18	Germany (GER)	0	0	1	1
Totals (20 entries)		14	14	28	56

== Prize money ==
The sums written are per medalist, bringing the total prizes awarded to €154,000. (retrieved from:)

Medal	Total	Judoka	Coach
Gold	€5,000	€4,000	€1,000
Silver	€3,000	€2,400	€600
Bronze	€1,500	€1,200	€300
