= Judo at the 2022 Commonwealth Games – Men's 100 kg =

Judo competition

Judo – Men's 100 kg at the 2022 Commonwealth Games
- Venue: Coventry Arena
- Dates: 3 August 2022
- Competitors: 13 from 11 nations

Medalists
gold medal	Shady El Nahas	Canada
silver medal	Kyle Reyes	Canada
bronze medal	Rhys Thompson	England
bronze medal	Harry Lovell-Hewitt	England

The Men's 100 kg judo competitions at the 2022 Commonwealth Games in Birmingham, England took place on August 3 at the Coventry Arena. A total of 13 competitors from 11 nations took part.

== Results ==
The draw is as follows:

Round of 16
Tevita Takayawa (FIJ)	10
Hansley Adonis (MRI)	00
Eric Fouda (CMR)	00
Deepak Deswal (IND)	10
Harry Lovell-Hewitt (ENG)	10
Victor Ahiavor (GHA)	00
Jason Koster (NZL)	10
Qaisar Khan (PAK)	00
Rhys Thompson (ENG)	01 (yellow card)
Isaac Bezzina (MLT)	00

Quarter-finals
Shady El Nahas (CAN)	10
Tevita Takayawa (FIJ)	00
Deepak Deswal (IND)	00
Harry Lovell-Hewitt (ENG)	10
Kyle Reyes (CAN)	10
Jason Koster (NZL)	00 (yellow card)
Kayhan Ozcicek-Takagi (AUS)	01
Rhys Thompson (ENG)	10 (yellow card)

Semi-finals
Shady El Nahas (CAN)	10
Harry Lovell-Hewitt (ENG)	00
Kyle Reyes (CAN)	10
Rhys Thompson (ENG)	00

Final
Shady El Nahas (CAN)	01 (yellow card)
Kyle Reyes (CAN)	00

=== Repechages ===
Repechage
Tevita Takayawa (FIJ)	10
Deepak Deswal (IND)	00
Jason Koster (NZL)	00
Kayhan Ozcicek-Takagi (AUS)	10

Bronze medal
Tevita Takayawa (FIJ)	00 (yellow card)
Rhys Thompson (ENG)	10
Kayhan Ozcicek-Takagi (AUS)	00
Harry Lovell-Hewitt (ENG)	10
