= 2022 Judo Grand Prix Zagreb =

Judo Competition

Judo 2022 Judo Grand Prix Zagreb
- Venue: Arena Zagreb
- Location: Zagreb, Croatia
- Dates: 15–17 July 2022
- Competitors: 477 from 67 nations
- Total prize money: 98,000€

Competition at external databases
- Links: IJF • EJU • JudoInside

The 2022 Judo Grand Prix Zagreb was held in Zagreb, Croatia, from 15 to 17 July 2022 as part of the IJF World Tour and during the 2024 Summer Olympics qualification period.

== Event videos ==
The event aired on the IJF YouTube channel.

| | Weight classes | Preliminaries | | | Final Block |
|---|---|---|---|---|---|
| Day 1 | Men: -60, -66 Women: -48, -52, -57 | Commentated | | | Commentated |
| Day 1 | Men: -60, -66 Women: -48, -52, -57 | Tatami 1 | Tatami 2 | Tatami 3 | Commentated |
| Day 2 | Men: -73, -81 Women: -63, -70 | Commentated | | | |
| Day 2 | Men: -73, -81 Women: -63, -70 | Tatami 1 | Tatami 2 | Tatami 3 | |
| Day 3 | Men: -90, -100, +100 Women: -78, +78 | Commentated | | | |
| Day 3 | Men: -90, -100, +100 Women: -78, +78 | Tatami 1 | Tatami 2 | Tatami 3 | |

== Medal summary ==
=== Men's events ===
| Event | Gold | Silver | Bronze |
|---|---|---|---|
| Extra-lightweight (−60 kg) | Magzhan Shamshadin (KAZ) | Kim Won-jin (KOR) | Genki Koga (JPN) |
| Extra-lightweight (−60 kg) | Magzhan Shamshadin (KAZ) | Kim Won-jin (KOR) | Giorgi Sardalashvili (GEO) |
| Half-lightweight (−66 kg) | Yashar Najafov (AZE) | Matteo Piras (ITA) | Ivo Verhorstert (NED) |
| Half-lightweight (−66 kg) | Yashar Najafov (AZE) | Matteo Piras (ITA) | Bayanmönkhiin Narmandakh (MGL) |
| Lightweight (−73 kg) | Manuel Lombardo (ITA) | Magdiel Estrada (CUB) | Lee Eun-kyul (KOR) |
| Lightweight (−73 kg) | Manuel Lombardo (ITA) | Magdiel Estrada (CUB) | Daniel Cargnin (BRA) |
| Half-middleweight (−81 kg) | Alpha Oumar Djalo (FRA) | Saeid Mollaei (AZE) | Tato Grigalashvili (GEO) |
| Half-middleweight (−81 kg) | Alpha Oumar Djalo (FRA) | Saeid Mollaei (AZE) | João Fernando (POR) |
| Middleweight (−90 kg) | Beka Gviniashvili (GEO) | Rafael Macedo (BRA) | Kenta Nagasawa (JPN) |
| Middleweight (−90 kg) | Beka Gviniashvili (GEO) | Rafael Macedo (BRA) | Eduard Trippel (GER) |
| Half-heavyweight (−100 kg) | Michael Korrel (NED) | Ilia Sulamanidze (GEO) | Daniel Eich (SUI) |
| Half-heavyweight (−100 kg) | Michael Korrel (NED) | Ilia Sulamanidze (GEO) | Piotr Kuczera (POL) |
| Heavyweight (+100 kg) | Jur Spijkers (NED) | Odkhüügiin Tsetsentsengel (MGL) | Ushangi Kokauri (AZE) |
| Heavyweight (+100 kg) | Jur Spijkers (NED) | Odkhüügiin Tsetsentsengel (MGL) | Erik Abramov (GER) |

=== Women's events ===
| Event | Gold | Silver | Bronze |
|---|---|---|---|
| Extra-lightweight (−48 kg) | Wakana Koga (JPN) | Mélanie Vieu (FRA) | Tuğçe Beder (TUR) |
| Extra-lightweight (−48 kg) | Wakana Koga (JPN) | Mélanie Vieu (FRA) | Laura Martínez (ESP) |
| Half-lightweight (−52 kg) | Uta Abe (JPN) | Distria Krasniqi (KOS) | Fabienne Kocher (SUI) |
| Half-lightweight (−52 kg) | Uta Abe (JPN) | Distria Krasniqi (KOS) | Gefen Primo (ISR) |
| Lightweight (−57 kg) | Christa Deguchi (CAN) | Eteri Liparteliani (GEO) | Mönkhtsedeviin Ichinkhorloo (MGL) |
| Lightweight (−57 kg) | Christa Deguchi (CAN) | Eteri Liparteliani (GEO) | Mina Libeer (BEL) |
| Half-middleweight (−63 kg) | Catherine Beauchemin-Pinard (CAN) | Anriquelis Barrios (VEN) | Boldyn Gankhaich (MGL) |
| Half-middleweight (−63 kg) | Catherine Beauchemin-Pinard (CAN) | Anriquelis Barrios (VEN) | Ketleyn Quadros (BRA) |
| Middleweight (−70 kg) | Barbara Matić (CRO) | Miriam Butkereit (GER) | Lara Cvjetko (CRO) |
| Middleweight (−70 kg) | Barbara Matić (CRO) | Miriam Butkereit (GER) | Elvismar Rodríguez (VEN) |
| Half-heavyweight (−78 kg) | Natalie Powell (GBR) | Inbar Lanir (ISR) | Mayra Aguiar (BRA) |
| Half-heavyweight (−78 kg) | Natalie Powell (GBR) | Inbar Lanir (ISR) | Natascha Ausma (NED) |
| Heavyweight (+78 kg) | Raz Hershko (ISR) | Milica Žabić (SRB) | Léa Fontaine (FRA) |
| Heavyweight (+78 kg) | Raz Hershko (ISR) | Milica Žabić (SRB) | Amarsaikhany Adiyaasüren (MGL) |

Source Results

=== Medal table ===
* Host nation (Croatia)

| Rank | Nation | Gold | Silver | Bronze | Total |
|---|---|---|---|---|---|
| 1 | Japan (JPN) | 2 | 0 | 2 | 4 |
| 1 | Netherlands (NED) | 2 | 0 | 2 | 4 |
| 3 | Canada (CAN) | 2 | 0 | 0 | 2 |
| 4 | Georgia (GEO) | 1 | 2 | 2 | 5 |
| 5 | Azerbaijan (AZE) | 1 | 1 | 1 | 3 |
| 5 | France (FRA) | 1 | 1 | 1 | 3 |
| 5 | Israel (ISR) | 1 | 1 | 1 | 3 |
| 8 | Italy (ITA) | 1 | 1 | 0 | 2 |
| 9 | Croatia (CRO)* | 1 | 0 | 1 | 2 |
| 10 | Great Britain (GBR) | 1 | 0 | 0 | 1 |
| 10 | Kazakhstan (KAZ) | 1 | 0 | 0 | 1 |
| 12 | Mongolia (MGL) | 0 | 1 | 4 | 5 |
| 13 | Brazil (BRA) | 0 | 1 | 3 | 4 |
| 14 | Germany (GER) | 0 | 1 | 2 | 3 |
| 15 | South Korea (KOR) | 0 | 1 | 1 | 2 |
| 15 | Venezuela (VEN) | 0 | 1 | 1 | 2 |
| 17 | Cuba (CUB) | 0 | 1 | 0 | 1 |
| 17 | Kosovo (KOS) | 0 | 1 | 0 | 1 |
| 17 | Serbia (SRB) | 0 | 1 | 0 | 1 |
| 20 | Switzerland (SUI) | 0 | 0 | 2 | 2 |
| 21 | Belgium (BEL) | 0 | 0 | 1 | 1 |
| 21 | Poland (POL) | 0 | 0 | 1 | 1 |
| 21 | Portugal (POR) | 0 | 0 | 1 | 1 |
| 21 | Spain (ESP) | 0 | 0 | 1 | 1 |
| 21 | Turkey (TUR) | 0 | 0 | 1 | 1 |
| Totals (25 entries) | | 14 | 14 | 28 | 56 |

| Event | | (Azerbaijan) AZE | (Brazil) BRA | (Belgium) BEL | (Canada) CAN | (Croatia) CRO | (Cuba) CUB | (Spain) ESP | (France) FRA | (United Kingdom) GBR | (Georgia (country)) GEO | (Germany) GER | (Italy) ITA | (Israel) ISR | (Japan) JAP | (Kazakhstan) KAZ | (Kosovo) KOS | (South Korea) KOR | (Mongolia) MGL | (Netherlands) NED | (Poland) POL | (Portugal) POR | (Serbia) SRB | (Switzerland) SUI | (Turkey) TUR | (Venezuela) VEN |
|---|---|---|---|---|---|---|---|---|---|---|---|---|---|---|---|---|---|---|---|---|---|---|---|---|---|---|
Men's
| Men's | 60 kg | | | | | | | | | | 3rd place, bronze medalist(s) | | | | 3rd place, bronze medalist(s) | 1st place, gold medalist(s) | | 2nd place, silver medalist(s) | | | | | | | | |
| Men's | 66 kg | 1st place, gold medalist(s) | | | | | | | | | | | 2nd place, silver medalist(s) | | | | | | 3rd place, bronze medalist(s) | 3rd place, bronze medalist(s) | | | | | | |
| Men's | 73 kg | | 3rd place, bronze medalist(s) | | | | 2nd place, silver medalist(s) | | | | | | 1st place, gold medalist(s) | | | | | 3rd place, bronze medalist(s) | | | | | | | | |
| Men's | 81 kg | 2nd place, silver medalist(s) | | | | | | | 1st place, gold medalist(s) | | 3rd place, bronze medalist(s) | | | | | | | | | | | 3rd place, bronze medalist(s) | | | | |
| Men's | 90 kg | | 2nd place, silver medalist(s) | | | | | | | | 1st place, gold medalist(s) | 3rd place, bronze medalist(s) | | | 3rd place, bronze medalist(s) | | | | | | | | | | | |
| Men's | 100 kg | | | | | | | | | | 2nd place, silver medalist(s) | | | | | | | | | 1st place, gold medalist(s) | 3rd place, bronze medalist(s) | | | 3rd place, bronze medalist(s) | | |
| Men's | +100 kg | 3rd place, bronze medalist(s) | | | | | | | | | | 3rd place, bronze medalist(s) | | | | | | | 2nd place, silver medalist(s) | 1st place, gold medalist(s) | | | | | | |
Women's
| Women's | 48 kg | | | | | | | 3rd place, bronze medalist(s) | 2nd place, silver medalist(s) | | | | | | 1st place, gold medalist(s) | | | | | | | | | | 3rd place, bronze medalist(s) | |
| Women's | 52 kg | | | | | | | | | | | | | 3rd place, bronze medalist(s) | 1st place, gold medalist(s) | | 2nd place, silver medalist(s) | | | | | | | 3rd place, bronze medalist(s) | | |
| Women's | 57 kg | | | 3rd place, bronze medalist(s) | 1st place, gold medalist(s) | | | | | | 2nd place, silver medalist(s) | | | | | | | | 3rd place, bronze medalist(s) | | | | | | | |
| Women's | 63 kg | | 3rd place, bronze medalist(s) | | 1st place, gold medalist(s) | | | | | | | | | | | | | | 3rd place, bronze medalist(s) | | | | | | | 2nd place, silver medalist(s) |
| Women's | 70 kg | | | | | 1st place, gold medalist(s) 3rd place, bronze medalist(s) | | | | | | 2nd place, silver medalist(s) | | | | | | | | | | | | | | 3rd place, bronze medalist(s) |
| Women's | 78 kg | | 3rd place, bronze medalist(s) | | | | | | | 1st place, gold medalist(s) | | | | 2nd place, silver medalist(s) | | | | | 3rd place, bronze medalist(s) | | | | | | | |
| Women's | +78 kg | | | | | | | | 3rd place, bronze medalist(s) | | | | | 1st place, gold medalist(s) | | | | | 3rd place, bronze medalist(s) | | | | 2nd place, silver medalist(s) | | | |

== Prize money ==
The sums written are per medalist, bringing the total prizes awarded to 98,000€. (retrieved from:)

| Medal | Total | Judoka | Coach |
|---|---|---|---|
| Gold | 3,000€ | 2,400€ | 600€ |
| Silver | 2,000€ | 1,600€ | 400€ |
| Bronze | 1,000€ | 800€ | 200€ |
