= William Lovell-Hewitt =

English cricketer

Personal information
- Full name: William Lovell-Hewitt
- Born: 7 November 1901; Trowbridge, Wiltshire, England
- Died: 5 October 1984 (aged 82); Coulsdon, Surrey, England
- Batting: Right-handed
- Bowling: Right-arm medium

Domestic team information
- Years: Team
- 1938–1939: Minor Counties
- 1920–1939: Wiltshire

Career statistics
Competition	First-class
Matches	3
Runs scored	175
Batting average	35.00
100s/50s	–/2
Top score	92
Balls bowled	72
Wickets	–
Bowling average	–
5 wickets in innings	–
10 wickets in match	–
Best bowling	–
Catches/stumpings	1/–
- Source: Cricinfo, 30 July 2013

William Lovell-Hewitt (7 November 1901 – 5 October 1984) was an English cricketer active in the 1920s and 1930s. Born at Trowle Manor, Trowbridge, Wiltshire, Lovell-Hewitt was a right-handed batsman who bowled right-arm medium bowler who played the majority of his cricket in minor counties cricket, though he did make three appearances in first-class cricket.

William Lovell-Hewitt is the great-grandfather of British Judoka Harry Lovell-Hewitt.

== Career ==
Lovell-Hewitt made his debut in minor counties cricket for Wiltshire against Glamorgan in the 1920 Minor Counties Championship. He was a regular feature in the Wiltshire team throughout the 1920s, and by 1935 he had assumed the captaincy from Robert Awdry. Lovell-Hewitt captained the county until 1939, by which point he had appeared in 98 Minor Counties Championship matches. Lovell-Hewitt made three appearances in first-class cricket, all for a combined Minor Counties team, debuting against Oxford University in 1938, before making a second appearance against the same opposition in 1939, as well as appearing against the touring West Indians in that season. Lovell-Hewitt scored 175 runs in his three first-class appearances, averaging 35.00, and top-scoring with 92. This score came against Oxford University in 1939, with him also making a second half century in the match with 69. He captained the Minor Counties in all three of his matches.

He died at Woodcote Park, Coulsdon, Surrey on 5 October 1984.
