= Gennaro Pirelli =

Italian judoka (born 2000)

Personal information
- Born: 21 August 2000 (age 26) Naples, Italy
- Occupation: Judoka

Sport
- Country: Italy
- Sport: Judo
- Weight class: ‍–‍100 kg

Achievements and titles
- Olympic Games: R16 (2024)
- World Champ.: (bronze) (2026)
- European Champ.: (gold) (2026)
Medal record
Men's judo
Representing Italy
World Championships
| Bronze medal – third place | 2024 Abu Dhabi | Mixed team |
| Bronze medal – third place | 2026 Baku | ‍–‍100 kg |
European Championships
| Gold medal – first place | 2026 Tbilisi | ‍–‍100 kg |
| Bronze medal – third place | 2024 Zagreb | ‍–‍100 kg |
| Bronze medal – third place | 2025 Podgorica | ‍–‍100 kg |
IJF Grand Slam
| Gold medal – first place | 2022 Tokyo | ‍–‍100 kg |
| Gold medal – first place | 2024 Dushanbe | ‍–‍100 kg |
| Gold medal – first place | 2026 Ulaanbaatar | ‍–‍100 kg |
| Gold medal – first place | 2026 Budapest | ‍–‍100 kg |
| Silver medal – second place | 2024 Tokyo | ‍–‍100 kg |
| Bronze medal – third place | 2022 Baku | ‍–‍100 kg |
IJF Grand Prix
| Gold medal – first place | 2026 Lima | ‍–‍100 kg |
| Silver medal – second place | 2025 Guadalajara | ‍–‍100 kg |
European U23 Championships
| Gold medal – first place | 2021 Budapest | ‍–‍90 kg |
World Juniors Championships
| Bronze medal – third place | 2019 Marrakesh | ‍–‍90 kg |

Profile at external databases
- IJF: 39933
- JudoInside.com: 111253
- Updated on 9 October 2026

Gennaro Pirelli (born 21 August 2000) is an Italian judoka. He represented Italy at the 2024 Summer Olympics.

== Career ==
In May 2024, Pirelli competed at the 2024 Judo Grand Slam Dushanbe and won a gold medal in the –100 kg category and qualified for the 2024 Summer Olympics. He represented Italy in the –100 kg category and was eliminated in the round of 16.

In April 2026, he competed at the 2026 European Judo Championships and won a gold medal in the –100 kg category. In June 2026, he competed at the 2026 Judo Grand Slam Ulaanbaatar and won a gold medal in the –100 kg category. In August 2026, he competed at the 2026 Judo Grand Prix Lima and won his first career Grand Prix gold medal in the –100 kg category.

In September 2026, he competed at the 2026 Judo Grand Slam Budapest and again won a gold medal in the –100 kg category, defeating two-time world champion Jorge Fonseca in the final. This extended his unbeaten streak to 18 consecutive contests. Following his victory, he was ranked number one in the world in the –100 kg category. The next month he competed at the 2026 World Judo Championships in the –100 kg category and lost in the semifinals to Georgia's Ilia Sulamanidze. In the repechage, he defeated Uzbekistan's Tulkinbek Turdiev to win a bronze medal.
