= Ilshat Bilalov =

Russian ice hockey player

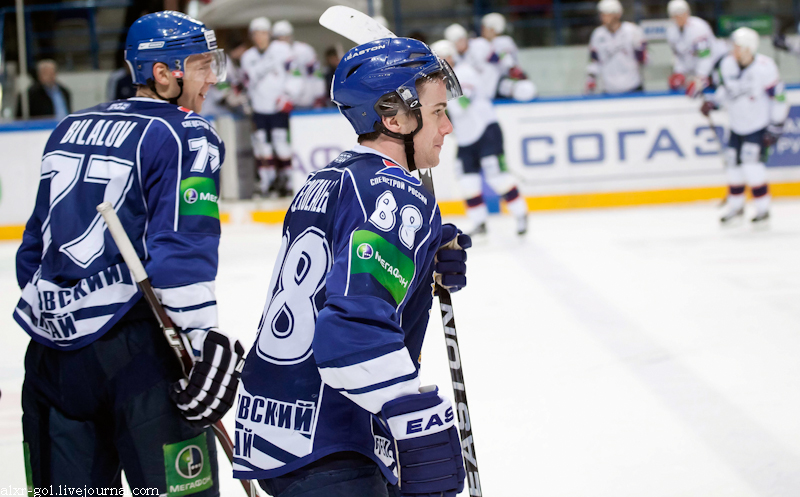
- Petružálek and Bilalov 2011-12-04 Amur-Sibir KHL-game
- Born: January 15, 1985 (age 40); Nizhnekamsk, USSR
- Height: 6 ft 0 in (183 cm)
- Weight: 181 lb (82 kg; 12 st 13 lb)
- Position: Defence
- Shoots: Left
- KHL team Former teams: Amur Khabarovsk; HC Neftekhimik Nizhnekamsk
- Playing career: 2004–present

Ilshat Bilalov (born January 15, 1985) is a Russian professional ice hockey defenceman who currently plays for Amur Khabarovsk of the Kontinental Hockey League (KHL).
