= Dzhafar Kostoev =

Emirati judoka (born 1999)

Personal information
- Native name: Джафар Бесланович Костоев
- Full name: Dzhafar Beslanovich Kostoev
- Born: 28 April 1999 (age 27) Nazran, Ingushetia, Russia
- Occupation: Judoka
- Height: 187 cm (6 ft 2 in)

Sport
- Country: Russia (until 2019); United Arab Emirates (since 2022)
- Sport: Judo
- Weight class: ‍–‍100 kg

Achievements and titles
- Olympic Games: R16 (2024)
- World Champ.: 5th (2025)
- Asian Champ.: (gold) (2022)
- National finals: (gold) (2018)
Medal record
Men's judo
Representing United Arab Emirates
Asian Games
| Bronze medal – third place | 2023 Hangzhou | ‍–‍100 kg |
Asian Championships
| Gold medal – first place | 2022 Nur‑Sultan | ‍–‍100 kg |
| Silver medal – second place | 2024 Hong Kong | ‍–‍100 kg |
| Silver medal – second place | 2025 Bangkok | ‍–‍100 kg |
| Silver medal – second place | 2026 Ordos | ‍–‍100 kg |
IJF Grand Slam
| Gold medal – first place | 2025 Paris | ‍–‍100 kg |
| Gold medal – first place | 2025 Dushanbe | ‍–‍100 kg |
| Silver medal – second place | 2023 Paris | ‍–‍100 kg |
| Silver medal – second place | 2023 Astana | ‍–‍100 kg |
| Bronze medal – third place | 2023 Tashkent | ‍–‍100 kg |
| Bronze medal – third place | 2024 Dushanbe | ‍–‍100 kg |
IJF Grand Prix
| Bronze medal – third place | 2025 Qingdao | ‍–‍100 kg |
Representing Russia
European Cadet Championships
| Gold medal – first place | 2016 Vantaa | ‍–‍90 kg |

Profile at external databases
- IJF: 31216, 70512
- JudoInside.com: 105544
- Updated on 20 April 2026

Dzhafar Beslanovich Kostoev (Russian: Джафар Бесланович Костоев, born 28 April 1999) is a Russian judoka who represents the United Arab Emirates on the international circuit. 2024 Olympian. 2018 Russian national champion. 2022 Asian champion.

== Sport career ==
Kostoev started judo at the age of six under his first coach Ruslan Aksagov in Nazran, Ingushetia. Dzhafar has won distinction in international competition. He won three Cadet European cups in 2016, also he won the gold medal at the 2016 European Cadet Judo Championships at ‍–‍90 kg. In September 2017, he finished at the third place at the Kanō Jigorō international held in Vladivostok. In 2018, he won the senior Russian National Championships. Since 2022 he started representing United Arab Emirates and took the gold medal from the Asian Championships at 100 kg. In 2023, he earned silver medals at the Grand Slam Paris and Grand Slam Astana as well as bronze medal at the Grand Slam Tashkent. At the 2024 Summer Olympics he finished in the 9th place.

== Achievements ==
- (gold) 2016 Cadet European Championships
- (bronze) 2017 Kanō Jigorō tournament
- (gold) 2018 Russian National Championships
- (gold) 2022 Asian Championships
- (silver) 2023 Grand Slam Paris
- (bronze) 2023 Grand Slam Tashkent
- (silver) 2023 Grand Slam Astana
