= Aurélien Diesse =

French judoka (born 1997)

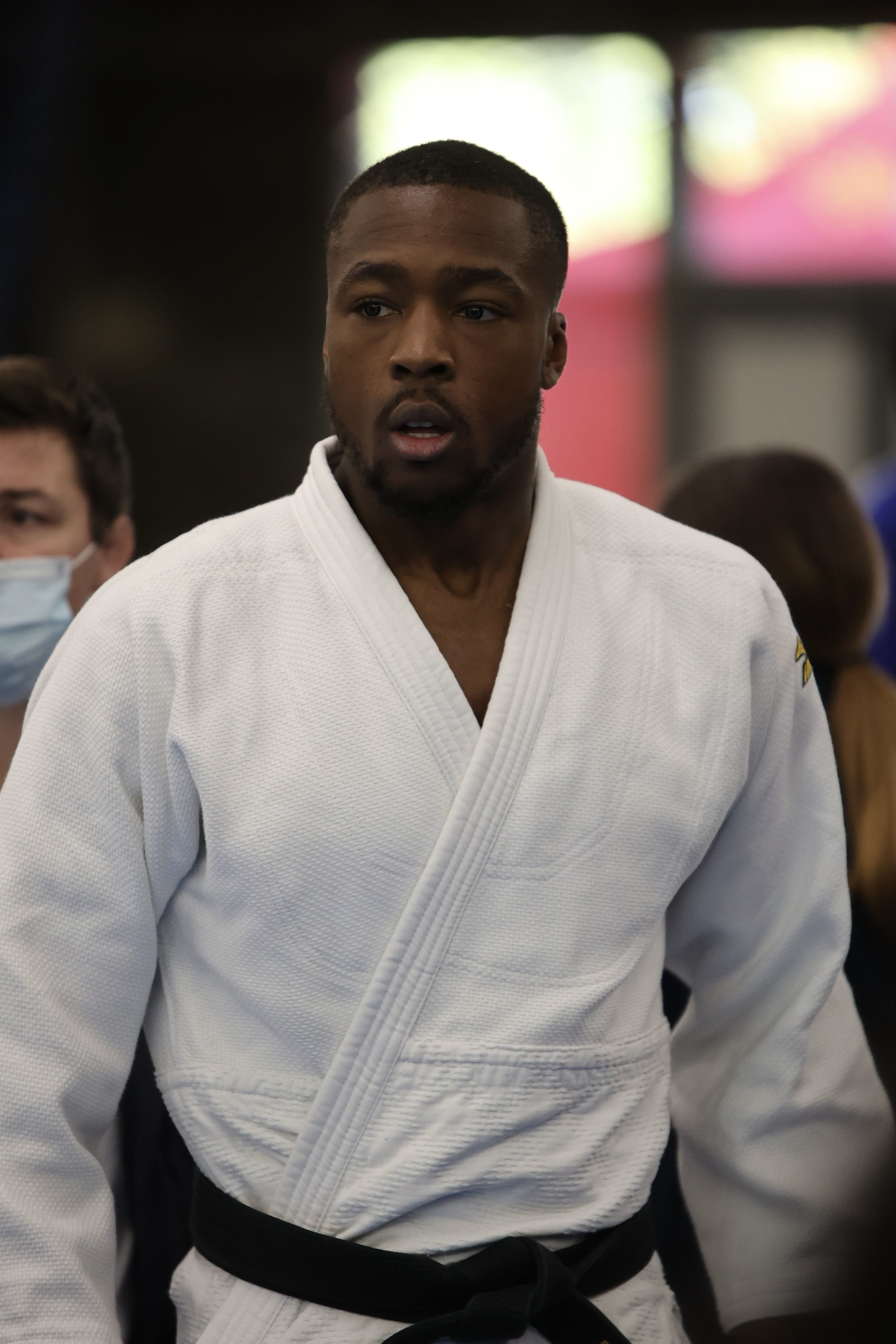

Personal information
- Nationality: French
- Born: 16 October 1997 (age 29) Paris, France
- Occupation: Judoka

Sport
- Country: France
- Sport: Judo
- Weight class: ‍–‍90 kg, ‍–‍100 kg

Achievements and titles
- Olympic Games: R16 (2024)
- World Champ.: R32 (2018)
- European Champ.: R16 (2019)
Medal record
Men's judo
Representing France
Olympic Games
Gold medal – first place	2024 Paris	Mixed team
World Championships
Silver medal – second place	2018 Baku	Mixed team
European Games
Bronze medal – third place	2019 Minsk	Mixed team
IJF Grand Slam
Silver medal – second place	2026 Abu Dhabi	‍–‍100 kg
Bronze medal – third place	2023 Baku	‍–‍100 kg
IJF Grand Prix
Bronze medal – third place	2025 Lima	‍–‍100 kg
European Junior Championships
Gold medal – first place	2017 Maribor	‍–‍90 kg
Bronze medal – third place	2016 Málaga	‍–‍90 kg

Profile at external databases
- IJF: 22972
- JudoInside.com: 14430
- Updated on 1 November 2026

Aurélien Diesse (born 16 October 1997 in Paris) is a French judoka.

Diesse participated at the 2018 World Judo Championships, winning a medal in the mixed team event.

== Personal life ==
Born in France, Diesse is of Cameroonian descent.
