= Rhys Thompson =

British judoka

Personal information
- Nationality: British (English)
- Born: 19 July 1996 (age 30) London, England
- Occupation: Judoka

Sport
- Sport: Judo
- Weight class: ‍–‍100 kg
- Club: Enfield Judo Club; Team Bath

Achievements and titles
- World Champ.: R64 (2025)
- European Champ.: R16 (2022)
- Commonwealth Games: (bronze) (2022)
Medal record
Men's judo
Representing Great Britain
IJF Grand Prix
Gold medal – first place	2022 Perth	‍–‍100 kg
Silver medal – second place	2024 Zagreb	‍–‍100 kg
Representing England
Commonwealth Games
Bronze medal – third place	2022 Birmingham	‍–‍100 kg

Profile at external databases
- IJF: 20999
- JudoInside.com: 90718
- Updated on 18 June 2025

Rhys Thompson (born 19 July 1996) is an English international judoka. He has represented England at the Commonwealth Games and won a bronze medal.

== Biography ==
Thompson won three British championships, winning the half-heavyweight title at the British Judo Championships in 2018, 2021 and 2022. He has twice won medals at the European Open.

In 2022, he was selected for the 2022 Commonwealth Games in Birmingham where he competed in the men's 100 kg, winning the bronze medal. At the 2022 British National Championships he successfully defended his -100 kg title.

In December 2024, Thompson won his fourth half-heavyweight title at the British Judo Championships.
