= Niyaz Bilalov =

Russian judoka (born 1994)

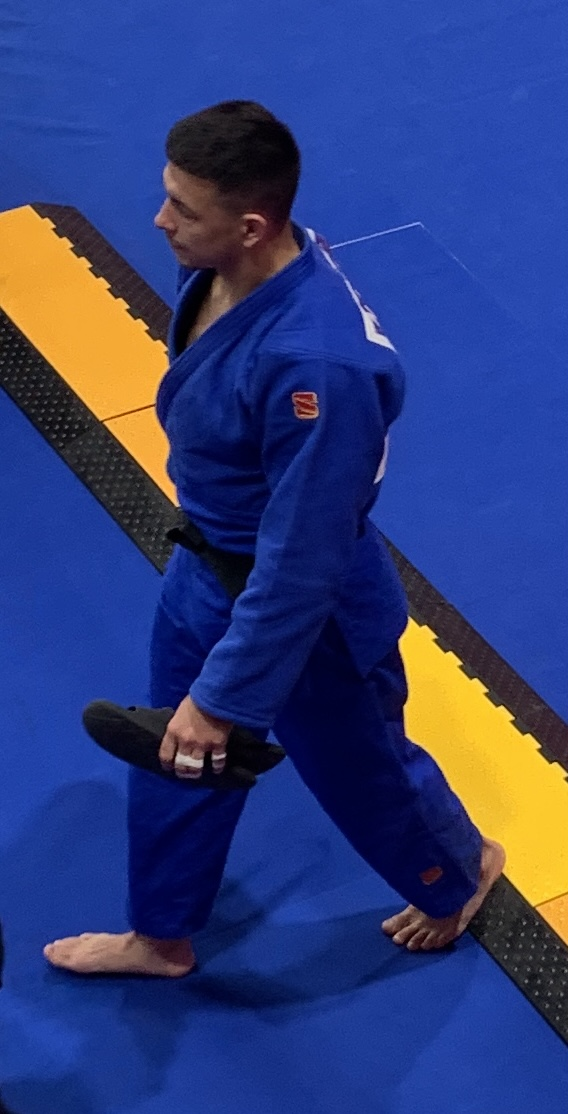

Personal information
- Born: 5 September 1994 (age 32)
- Occupation: Judoka

Sport
- Country: Russia
- Sport: Judo
- Weight class: ‍–‍100 kg

Achievements and titles
- World Champ.: (bronze) (2026)
- European Champ.: 5th (2018, 2026)
Medal record
Men's judo
Representing Russia
World Championships
Bronze medal – third place	2026 Baku	‍–‍100 kg
IJF Grand Slam
Gold medal – first place	2017 Abu Dhabi	‍–‍100 kg
Gold medal – first place	2021 Baku	‍–‍100 kg
Silver medal – second place	2026 Tbilisi	‍–‍100 kg
Bronze medal – third place	2016 Tyumen	‍–‍100 kg
Bronze medal – third place	2018 Düsseldorf	‍–‍100 kg
Bronze medal – third place	2021 Kazan	‍–‍100 kg
Bronze medal – third place	2026 Paris	‍–‍100 kg
Bronze medal – third place	2026 Budapest	‍–‍100 kg
IJF Grand Prix
Gold medal – first place	2018 Cancún	‍–‍100 kg
Bronze medal – third place	2015 Tashkent	‍–‍100 kg
European U23 Championships
Gold medal – first place	2016 Tel Aviv	‍–‍100 kg
Bronze medal – third place	2015 Bratislava	‍–‍100 kg
World University Games
Bronze medal – third place	2015 Gwangju	‍–‍100 kg
Bronze medal – third place	2017 Taipei	‍–‍100 kg
Representing the IJF
IJF Grand Slam
Silver medal – second place	2024 Abu Dhabi	‍–‍100 kg
Bronze medal – third place	2025 Baku	‍–‍100 kg
IJF Grand Prix
Gold medal – first place	2025 Qingdao	‍–‍100 kg
Representing Individual Neutral Athletes
IJF Grand Slam
Bronze medal – third place	2024 Baku	‍–‍100 kg
IJF Grand Prix
Silver medal – second place	2023 Dushanbe	‍–‍100 kg

Profile at external databases
- IJF: 17364
- JudoInside.com: 28561
- Updated on 9 October 2026

Niyaz Almazovich Bilalov (Russian: Нияз Алмазович Билалов, born 5 September 1994) is a Russian judoka. Representing Russia, he earned a bronze medal at the 2026 World Judo Championships in Baku, Azerbaijan.

Bilalov is also a two-time gold medalist at the IJF Grand Slam in the ‍–‍100 kg category.
