= Laurin Boehler =

Austrian judoka (born 1995)

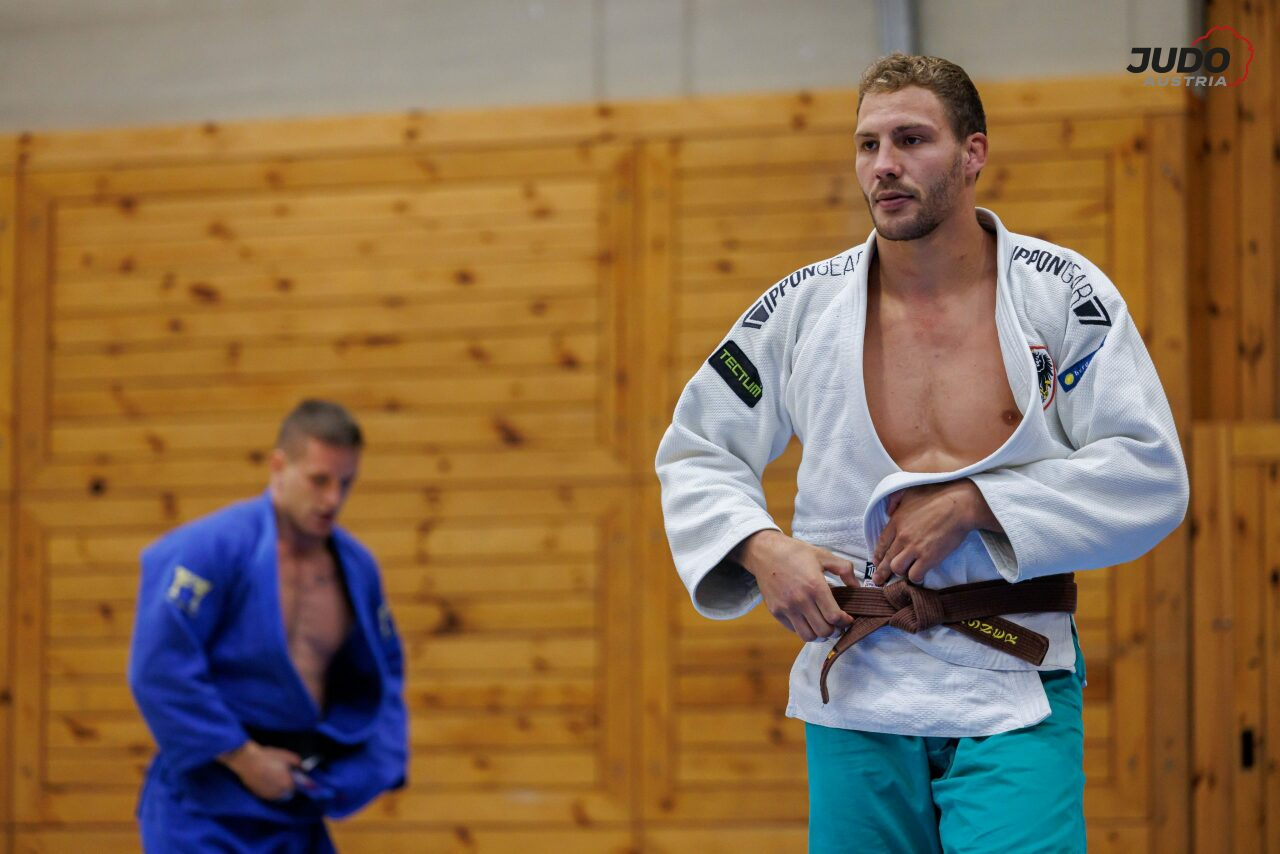
- Laurin Boehler (white green) participates in the Austrian 1. Bundesliga 2022

Personal information
- Born: 4 January 1995 (age 31)
- Occupation: Judoka
- Employer: Austrian Armed Forces
- Height: 189 cm (6 ft 2 in)
- Weight: 100 kg (220 lb)
- Military career
- Allegiance: Austria
- Branch: Austrian Armed Forces
- Service years: 2016–2025
- Rank: Zugsführer

Sport
- Country: Austria
- Sport: Judo
- Weight class: ‍–‍100 kg
- Rank: 1st dan black belt
- League: Austrian 1. Bundesliga
- Club: ULZ Hohenems
- Team: JU Flachgau
- Turned pro: 2016
- Retired: 2026

Achievements and titles
- World Champ.: R32 (2018)
- European Champ.: R16 (2023)
Medal record
Men's judo
Representing Austria
IJF Grand Slam
Bronze medal – third place	2017 Ekaterinburg	‍–‍100 kg
Bronze medal – third place	2018 Ekaterinburg	‍–‍100 kg
Bronze medal – third place	2019 Düsseldorf	‍–‍100 kg
Bronze medal – third place	2024 Tbilisi	‍–‍100 kg
IJF Grand Prix
Silver medal – second place	2018 Cancún	‍–‍100 kg
Bronze medal – third place	2016 Zagreb	‍–‍100 kg
Bronze medal – third place	2024 Linz	‍–‍100 kg

Profile at external databases
- IJF: 7855
- JudoInside.com: 79569
- Updated on 24 March 2024

Laurin Boehler (born 4 January 1995) is an Austrian judoka.

== Judo career ==
Boehler is a bronze medalist from the 2019 Judo Grand Slam Düsseldorf in the ‍–‍100 kg category. During the next few years Böhler suffered three ACL ruptures and a spinal disc herniation.

He collected 1625 points in the IJF Olympic Ranking and did not qualify for the Summer Games in Tokyo with rank 38 in his weight class.

After winning the bronze medal at the 2024 Judo Grand Prix Linz, Boehler revealed in an interview with ORF that he had been attacked by his teammate Wachid Borchashvili in August 2023. He complained that the consequences had been too lenient and that the training atmosphere had worsened since then.

He collected 1720 points in the IJF Olympic Ranking and did not qualify for the Summer Games in Paris with rank 34 in his weight class.

He retired after being eliminated from the 2026 Judo Grand Prix Linz.

== Personal life ==
Böhler is part of the Austrian Armed Forces since 2016. He is in a relationship with Lubjana Piovesana.
