= Nikoloz Sherazadishvili =

Spanish judoka (born 1996)

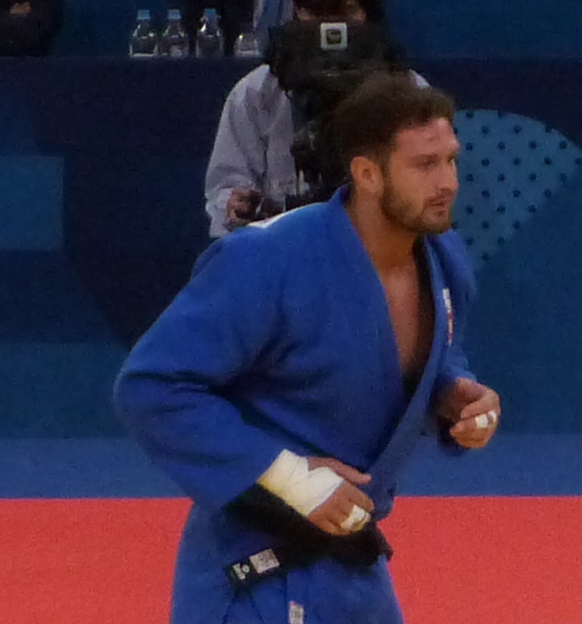

Personal information
- Native name: ნიკოლოზ შერაზადიშვილი
- Full name: Nikoloz Sherazadishvili Sakvarelidze
- Nationality: Georgian, Spanish
- Born: 19 February 1996 (age 30) Tbilisi, Georgia
- Occupation: Judoka
- Height: 1.90 m (6 ft 3 in)
- Website: www.nikoshera.com

Sport
- Country: Spain
- Sport: Judo
- Weight class: ‍–‍90 kg, ‍–‍100 kg
- Coached by: Joaquin Ruiz

Achievements and titles
- Olympic Games: 5th (2024)
- World Champ.: (gold) (2018, 2021)
- European Champ.: (bronze) (2018, 2022, 2023)
Medal record
Men's judo
Representing Spain
World Championships
Gold medal – first place	2018 Baku	‍–‍90 kg
Gold medal – first place	2021 Budapest	‍–‍90 kg
Bronze medal – third place	2024 Abu Dhabi	‍–‍100 kg
European Championships
Bronze medal – third place	2018 Tel Aviv	‍–‍90 kg
Bronze medal – third place	2022 Sofia	‍–‍100 kg
Bronze medal – third place	2023 Montpellier	‍–‍100 kg
World Masters
Gold medal – first place	2018 Guangzhou	‍–‍90 kg
Silver medal – second place	2019 Qingdao	‍–‍90 kg
Bronze medal – third place	2017 Saint Petersburg	‍–‍90 kg
IJF Grand Slam
Gold medal – first place	2017 Abu Dhabi	‍–‍90 kg
Gold medal – first place	2019 Brasilia	‍–‍90 kg
Gold medal – first place	2019 Abu Dhabi	‍–‍90 kg
Gold medal – first place	2020 Paris	‍–‍90 kg
Gold medal – first place	2024 Tbilisi	‍–‍100 kg
Silver medal – second place	2021 Tel Aviv	‍–‍90 kg
Silver medal – second place	2022 Antalya	‍–‍100 kg
Silver medal – second place	2022 Abu Dhabi	‍–‍100 kg
Silver medal – second place	2024 Paris	‍–‍100 kg
Bronze medal – third place	2018 Düsseldorf	‍–‍90 kg
Bronze medal – third place	2019 Baku	‍–‍90 kg
Bronze medal – third place	2020 Budapest	‍–‍90 kg
Bronze medal – third place	2022 Budapest	‍–‍100 kg
Bronze medal – third place	2025 Ulaanbaatar	‍–‍100 kg
Bronze medal – third place	2025 Abu Dhabi	‍–‍100 kg
IJF Grand Prix
Gold medal – first place	2017 Cancún	‍–‍90 kg
Gold medal – first place	2019 Budapest	‍–‍90 kg
Gold medal – first place	2025 Zagreb	‍–‍100 kg
Silver medal – second place	2018 The Hague	‍–‍90 kg
Silver medal – second place	2024 Odivelas	‍–‍100 kg
Bronze medal – third place	2016 Tbilisi	‍–‍90 kg
Bronze medal – third place	2026 Zagreb	‍–‍100 kg
World Juniors Championships
Silver medal – second place	2014 Fort Lauderdale	‍–‍90 kg
Silver medal – second place	2015 Abu Dhabi	‍–‍90 kg
European Junior Championships
Silver medal – second place	2016 Málaga	‍–‍90 kg
Bronze medal – third place	2014 Bucharest	‍–‍90 kg
Mediterranean Games
Gold medal – first place	2018 Tarragona	‍–‍90 kg
Gold medal – first place	2022 Oran	‍–‍100 kg

Profile at external databases
- IJF: 16577
- JudoInside.com: 80030
- Updated on 15 November 2026

Nikoloz Sherazadishvili Sakvarelidze (Georgian: ნიკოლოზ შერაზადიშვილი საყვარელიძე; born 19 February 1996) is a judoka. Born in Georgia, he competes internationally for Spain.

== Early life ==
Sherazadishvili began training in the sports of Judo and Water Polo at the age of 10, and immigrated to Madrid, Spain with his parents at the age of 14, he then decided to focus on Judo, where he would enter a club ran by former-Olympian, Joaquín "Quino" Ruiz, in Brunete, just outside Madrid. Sherazadishvili was granted Spanish citizenship in 2014, so he could begin competing under the Spanish flag.

== Judo career ==
=== 2018 ===
In April 2018, Sherazadishvili competed at the 2018 European Judo Championships in Tel Aviv, Israel, where he would successfully win a bronze medal. He lost to Mikhail Igolnikov in the quarter-final match by ippon in 18 seconds; however, he then rebounded against Belarus' judoka, Yahor Varapayeu to give Sherazadishvili his first ever senior continental medal.

=== 2018 World Judo Championships ===
On 24 September 2018, Sherazadishvili qualified for his first senior world championships, which were held in Baku, Azerbaijan. He would beat Iceland's Blondal in his first match and rematch his former opponent and 2018 European champion, Mikhail Igolnikov whom he would defeat by waza-ari. In the fourth round he would defeat Turkish judoka, Mikail Ozerler and would defeat former World Champion, Asley Gonzalez in the quarter-finals; advancing Sherazadishvili to the semi-finals. Sherazadishvili met with Hungary's Krisztian Toth whom he defeated by ippon and advanced to the finals against Ivan Felipe Silva. Sherazadishvili made history and became Spain's first ever world champion, when he won by ippon in the finals.
