= Simeon Catharina =

Dutch judoka

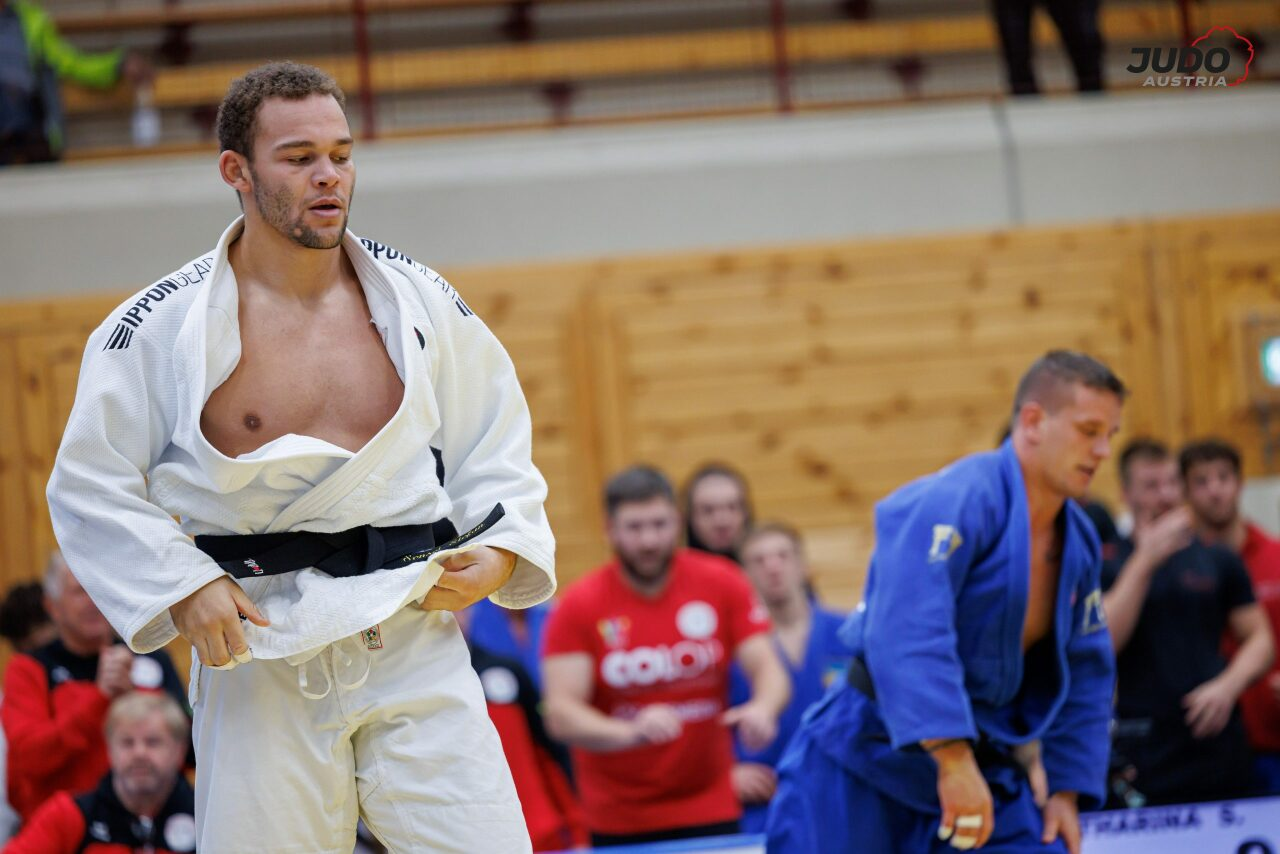
- CATHARINA Simeon (white) participates in the Austrian Ersten Bundesliga 2022

Personal information
- Nationality: Dutch
- Born: 24 February 1998 (age 28) The Hague, Netherlands
- Occupation: Judoka
- Website: www.simeoncatharina.nl

Sport
- Country: Netherlands
- Sport: Judo
- Weight class: ‍–‍100 kg

Achievements and titles
- World Champ.: 7th (2026)
- European Champ.: (silver) (2026)
Medal record
Men's judo
Representing the Netherlands
European Championships
Silver medal – second place	2026 Tbilisi	‍–‍100 kg
Bronze medal – third place	2025 Podgorica	‍–‍100 kg
World Masters
Silver medal – second place	2022 Jerusalem	‍–‍100 kg
IJF Grand Slam
Gold medal – first place	2021 Kazan	‍–‍100 kg
Silver medal – second place	2025 Tbilisi	‍–‍100 kg
Silver medal – second place	2026 Lausanne	‍–‍100 kg
Bronze medal – third place	2021 Paris	‍–‍100 kg
Bronze medal – third place	2026 Tbilisi	‍–‍100 kg
IJF Grand Prix
Bronze medal – third place	2019 Budapest	‍–‍100 kg
Bronze medal – third place	2021 Zagreb	‍–‍100 kg
Bronze medal – third place	2023 Zagreb	‍–‍100 kg
World Juniors Championships
Silver medal – second place	2018 Nassau	‍–‍100 kg
World Cadets Championships
Gold medal – first place	2015 Sarajevo	‍–‍90 kg
European Cadet Championships
Bronze medal – third place	2015 Sofia	‍–‍90 kg

Profile at external databases
- IJF: 19292
- JudoInside.com: 85304
- Updated on 9 October 2026

Simeon Catharina (born 24 February 1998) is a Dutch judoka.
