= Ilia Sulamanidze =

Georgian judoka (born 2001)

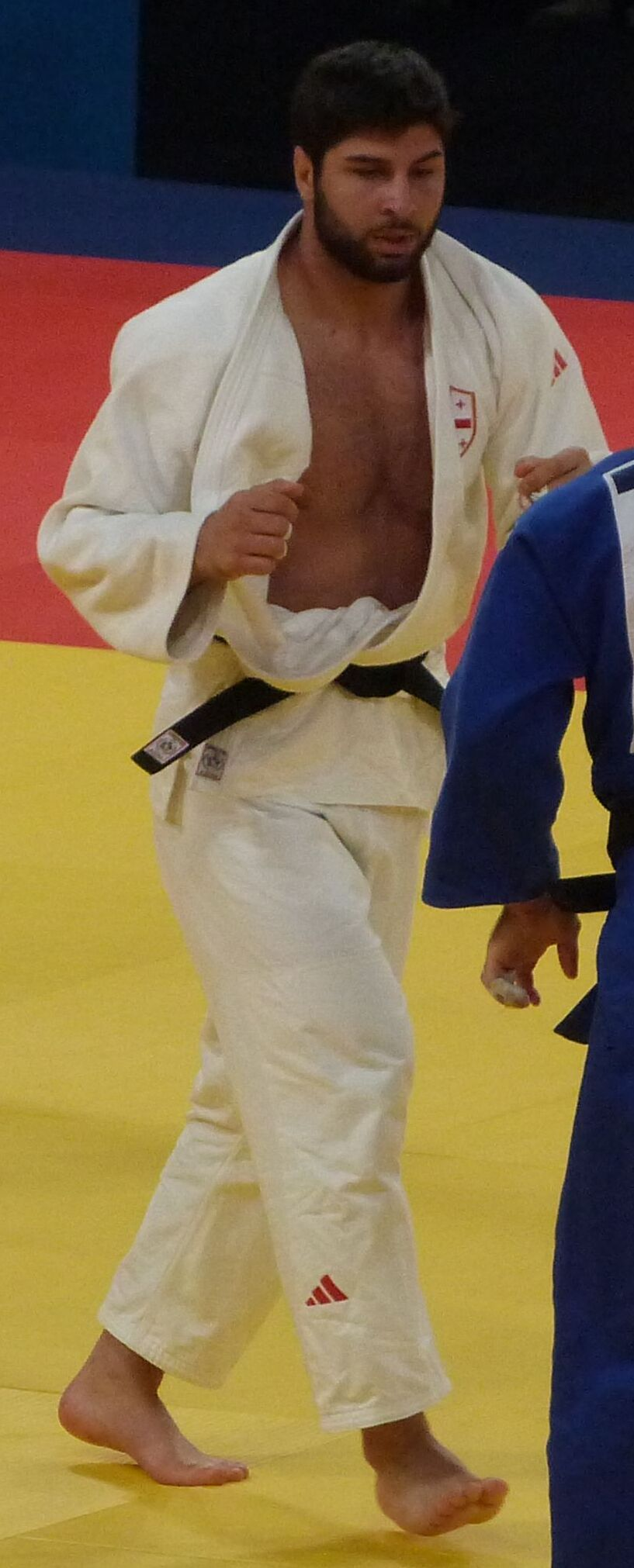
- Sulamanidze in 2024

Personal information
- Native name: ილია სულამანიძე
- Born: 18 June 2001 (age 25)
- Occupation: Judoka
- Height: 1.87 m (6 ft 2 in)

Sport
- Country: Georgia
- Sport: Judo
- Weight class: ‍–‍100 kg

Achievements and titles
- Olympic Games: (silver) (2024)
- World Champ.: (gold) (2026)
- European Champ.: (gold) (2025)
- Highest world ranking: 1^{st}
Medal record
Men's judo
Representing Georgia
Olympic Games
Silver medal – second place	2024 Paris	‍–‍100 kg
World Championships
Gold medal – first place	2026 Baku	‍–‍100 kg
Bronze medal – third place	2021 Budapest	‍–‍100 kg
European Championships
Gold medal – first place	2025 Podgorica	‍–‍100 kg
Silver medal – second place	2023 Montpellier	‍–‍100 kg
Silver medal – second place	2024 Zagreb	‍–‍100 kg
Bronze medal – third place	2026 Tbilisi	‍–‍100 kg
World Masters
Gold medal – first place	2022 Jerusalem	‍–‍100 kg
Bronze medal – third place	2023 Budapest	‍–‍100 kg
IJF Grand Slam
Gold medal – first place	2022 Tel Aviv	‍–‍100 kg
Gold medal – first place	2023 Tbilisi	‍–‍100 kg
Gold medal – first place	2023 Baku	‍–‍100 kg
Gold medal – first place	2024 Baku	‍–‍100 kg
Gold medal – first place	2025 Tokyo	‍–‍100 kg
Gold medal – first place	2026 Lausanne	‍–‍100 kg
Silver medal – second place	2021 Tbilisi	‍–‍100 kg
Bronze medal – third place	2021 Tel Aviv	‍–‍100 kg
Bronze medal – third place	2026 Ulaanbaatar	‍–‍100 kg
IJF Grand Prix
Gold medal – first place	2023 Almada	‍–‍100 kg
Silver medal – second place	2022 Zagreb	‍–‍100 kg
European U23 Championships
Gold medal – first place	2021 Budapest	‍–‍100 kg
Gold medal – first place	2022 Sarajevo	‍–‍100 kg
World Juniors Championships
Gold medal – first place	2021 Olbia	‍–‍100 kg
Silver medal – second place	2019 Marrakesh	‍–‍100 kg
European Junior Championships
Gold medal – first place	2019 Vantaa	‍–‍100 kg
Gold medal – first place	2020 Poreč	‍–‍100 kg
Bronze medal – third place	2021 Luxembourg	‍–‍100 kg
European Cadet Championships
Bronze medal – third place	2018 Sarajevo	‍–‍90 kg
Youth Olympic Games
Silver medal – second place	2018 Buenos Aires	‍–‍100 kg

Profile at external databases
- IJF: 38158
- JudoInside.com: 112163
- Updated on 9 October 2026

Ilia Sulamanidze (Georgian: ილია სულამანიძე; born 18 June 2001) is a Georgian judoka. He won silver medal in the men's 100 kg event at 2024 Summer Olympics.

Sulamanidze is a gold medalist at the World Judo Championships – at the 2026 edition in Baku, Azerbaijan. He also has a bronze medal at the 2021 edition in Budapest, Hungary.

== Career ==
In April 2021, he lost the bronze medal match in the men's 100 kg event at the 2021 European Championships held in Lisbon, Portugal.

Sulamanidze won the "Rising Star" award at the 2021 Judo Awards.

Sulamanidze won the gold medal in the half-heavyweight (‍–‍100 kg) event at the 2022 Tel Aviv Grand Slam held in Tel Aviv, Israel.
