= Piotr Kuczera =

Polish judoka (born 1995)

Personal information
- Born: 25 February 1995 (age 31)
- Occupation: Judoka

Sport
- Country: Poland
- Sport: Judo
- Weight class: ‍–‍90 kg, ‍–‍100 kg

Achievements and titles
- Olympic Games: R16 (2024)
- World Champ.: R16 (2021)
- European Champ.: (silver) (2022)
Medal record
Men's judo
Representing Poland
European Championships
| Silver medal – second place | 2022 Sofia | ‍–‍100 kg |
| Bronze medal – third place | 2016 Kazan | ‍–‍90 kg |
IJF Grand Slam
| Silver medal – second place | 2024 Baku | ‍–‍100 kg |
| Bronze medal – third place | 2024 Tashkent | ‍–‍100 kg |
IJF Grand Prix
| Bronze medal – third place | 2016 Zagreb | ‍–‍90 kg |
| Bronze medal – third place | 2018 Tbilisi | ‍–‍90 kg |
| Bronze medal – third place | 2019 Perth | ‍–‍90 kg |
| Bronze medal – third place | 2020 Tel Aviv | ‍–‍90 kg |
| Bronze medal – third place | 2022 Zagreb | ‍–‍100 kg |
| Bronze medal – third place | 2023 Perth | ‍–‍100 kg |
| Bronze medal – third place | 2025 Zagreb | ‍–‍100 kg |
European U23 Championships
| Bronze medal – third place | 2017 Podgorica | ‍–‍90 kg |
World Juniors Championships
| Bronze medal – third place | 2015 Abu Dhabi | ‍–‍90 kg |
European Junior Championships
| Bronze medal – third place | 2015 Oberwart | ‍–‍90 kg |

Profile at external databases
- IJF: 14431
- JudoInside.com: 78743
- Updated on 17 November 2025

Piotr Kuczera (born 25 February 1995) is a Polish judoka.

Kuczera is a 2016 European Judo Championships bronze medalist in the ‍–‍90 kg division.
