= Daniel Eich =

Swiss judoka (born 2000)

Personal information
- Born: 2 April 2000 (age 26)
- Occupation: Judoka

Sport
- Country: Switzerland
- Sport: Judo
- Weight class: ‍–‍100 kg

Achievements and titles
- Olympic Games: 5th (2024)
- World Champ.: R16 (2024)
- European Champ.: (bronze) (2022)
Medal record
Men's judo
Representing Switzerland
European Championships
| Bronze medal – third place | 2022 Sofia | ‍–‍100 kg |
IJF Grand Slam
| Silver medal – second place | 2023 Antalya | ‍–‍100 kg |
| Silver medal – second place | 2024 Dushanbe | ‍–‍100 kg |
| Silver medal – second place | 2024 Astana | ‍–‍100 kg |
| Silver medal – second place | 2025 Astana | ‍–‍100 kg |
| Bronze medal – third place | 2026 Budapest | ‍–‍100 kg |
IJF Grand Prix
| Silver medal – second place | 2022 Almada | ‍–‍100 kg |
| Bronze medal – third place | 2022 Zagreb | ‍–‍100 kg |
| Bronze medal – third place | 2025 Lima | ‍–‍100 kg |
| Bronze medal – third place | 2026 Zagreb | ‍–‍100 kg |
European Junior Championships
| Bronze medal – third place | 2020 Poreč | ‍–‍100 kg |

Profile at external databases
- IJF: 38194
- JudoInside.com: 107724
- Updated on 15 November 2026

Daniel Eich (born 2 April 2000) is a Swiss judoka. He won one of the bronze medals in the men's 100 kg event at the 2022 European Judo Championships held in Sofia, Bulgaria.

Eich won the silver medal in his event at the 2022 Judo Grand Prix Almada held in Almada, Portugal.
