= Judo at the 2020 Summer Olympics – Qualification =

Qualification for judo at the Games of the XXXII Olympiad

A total of 393, 128 athletes could qualify for judo at the 2020 Summer Olympics. The 2020 Summer Olympics were postponed to 2021 due to the COVID-19 pandemic. Each National Olympic Committee (NOC) could enter a maximum of 14 judokas (one in each division). Host nation Japan had reserved a spot in each of the 14 events, while twenty were made available to NOCs through a Tripartite Commission Invitation.

The remaining judoka underwent a qualifying process to earn a spot for the Games through the world ranking list prepared by International Judo Federation on June 28, 2021, and finalized on 5 July.

The top 18 athletes in each division directly qualify, though each NOC is subjected to a limit of 1 judoka per division. If the NOC contains more than a single athlete ranked in the top 18 of the world ranking list, the NOC can decide which of their athletes obtain the quota places.

Further continental quotas (13 men and 12 women for Europe, 12 of each gender for Africa, 10 men and 11 women for Pan America, 10 of each gender for Asia, and 5 of each gender for Oceania are also available. These quotas are assigned by creating a list of all athletes for each continent across all divisions and both genders. The top-ranked athletes qualify in turn, subject to the general rule of 1 athlete per NOC per division as well as the additional rule that each NOC may only qualify one judoka through the continental quotas (that is, ensuring that 100 different NOCs are represented through this qualification system).

Mixed team qualification was based on NOCs qualifying enough individual judokas across various divisions to have a six-person team meeting specific requirements (one man and one woman in each of three groups of divisions).

== Qualification summary ==
NOC	Men							Women							Mixed	Total
NOC	60 kg	66 kg	73 kg	81 kg	90 kg	100 kg	+100 kg	48 kg	52 kg	57 kg	63 kg	70 kg	78 kg	+78 kg	Team	Total
Albania		Yes														1
Algeria			Yes											Yes		2
Angola										Yes						1
Argentina				Yes				Yes								2
Armenia			Yes													1
Australia		Yes									Yes	Yes				3
Austria				Yes			Yes			Yes	Yes	Yes	Yes			6
Azerbaijan	Yes	Yes	Yes	Yes	Yes	Yes	Yes	Yes						Yes		9
Belarus		Yes				Yes								Yes		3
Belgium	Yes			Yes		Yes			Yes							4
Benin					Yes											1
Bhutan	Yes															1
Bosnia and Herzegovina														Yes		1
Brazil	Yes	Yes	Yes	Yes	Yes	Yes	Yes	Yes	Yes		Yes	Yes	Yes	Yes	Yes	13
Bulgaria	Yes			Yes						Yes						3
Burkina Faso			Yes													1
Cameroon												Yes		Yes		2
Canada			Yes	Yes		Yes			Yes	Yes	Yes					6
Cape Verde											Yes					1
Chad												Yes				1
Chile								Yes								1
China								Yes		Yes	Yes	Yes	Yes	Yes		6
Chinese Taipei	Yes							Yes		Yes						3
Colombia								Yes								1
Comoros				Yes												1
Costa Rica		Yes														1
Croatia												Yes	Yes	Yes		3
Cuba			Yes		Yes		Yes				Yes		Yes	Yes		6
Czech Republic					Yes		Yes									2
Ivory Coast										Yes						1
Democratic Republic of the Congo													Yes			1
Denmark											Yes					1
Djibouti			Yes													1
Dominican Republic					Yes											1
Ecuador	Yes										Yes		Yes			3
Egypt		Yes		Yes		Yes										3
Estonia						Yes										1
Fiji						Yes										1
France	Yes	Yes	Yes		Yes	Yes	Yes	Yes	Yes	Yes	Yes	Yes	Yes	Yes	Yes	13
Gabon													Yes			1
The Gambia			Yes													1
Georgia	Yes	Yes	Yes	Yes	Yes	Yes	Yes		Yes	Yes						9
Germany	Yes	Yes	Yes	Yes	Yes	Yes	Yes	Yes		Yes	Yes	Yes	Yes	Yes	Yes	13
Ghana					Yes											1
Great Britain	Yes								Yes		Yes	Yes	Yes	Yes		6
Greece				Yes								Yes				2
Guam				Yes												1
Guatemala	Yes															1
Guinea-Bissau									Yes							1
Haiti									Yes							1
Honduras											Yes					1
Hungary				Yes	Yes	Yes		Yes	Yes	Yes	Yes					7
Refugee Olympic Team			Yes		Yes		Yes			Yes	Yes	Yes			Yes	6
India								Yes								1
Ireland						Yes						Yes				2
Israel		Yes	Yes	Yes	Yes	Yes	Yes	Yes	Yes	Yes	Yes		Yes	Yes	Yes	12
Italy		Yes	Yes	Yes	Yes			Yes	Yes		Yes	Yes			Yes	8
Jamaica												Yes				1
Japan	Yes	Yes	Yes	Yes	Yes	Yes	Yes	Yes	Yes	Yes	Yes	Yes	Yes	Yes	Yes	14
Jordan			Yes													1
Kazakhstan	Yes	Yes	Yes	Yes	Yes			Yes								6
Kiribati												Yes				1
Kosovo			Yes					Yes	Yes	Yes			Yes			5
Kyrgyzstan				Yes												1
Laos	Yes															1
Latvia						Yes										1
Lebanon				Yes												1
Libya							Yes									1
Liechtenstein					Yes											1
Lithuania														Yes		1
Madagascar											Yes					1
Malawi								Yes								1
Mauritius					Yes											1
Mexico											Yes					1
Monaco			Yes													1
Mongolia	Yes	Yes	Yes	Yes	Yes	Yes	Yes	Yes	Yes	Yes	Yes		Yes		Yes	12
Montenegro													Yes			1
Morocco									Yes			Yes				2
Mozambique		Yes														1
Nepal								Yes								1
Netherlands	Yes			Yes	Yes	Yes	Yes			Yes	Yes	Yes	Yes	Yes	Yes	10
Nicaragua														Yes		1
Niger		Yes														1
North Macedonia									Yes							1
Pakistan						Yes										1
Palestine				Yes												1
Panama									Yes	Yes						2
Peru		Yes														1
Philippines											Yes					1
Poland					Yes		Yes		Yes	Yes	Yes		Yes			6
Portugal				Yes		Yes		Yes	Yes	Yes		Yes	Yes	Yes		8
Puerto Rico				Yes								Yes		Yes		3
Qatar		Yes														1
South Korea	Yes	Yes	Yes	Yes	Yes	Yes	Yes	Yes	Yes	Yes	Yes	Yes	Yes	Yes	Yes	14
Moldova		Yes	Yes													2
Romania			Yes				Yes		Yes							3
ROC	Yes	Yes	Yes	Yes	Yes	Yes	Yes	Yes	Yes	Yes	Yes	Yes	Yes		Yes	13
Samoa				Yes												1
San Marino					Yes											1
Saudi Arabia			Yes											Yes		2
Senegal							Yes									1
Serbia					Yes	Yes		Yes		Yes	Yes					5
Seychelles					Yes											1
Sierra Leone				Yes												1
Slovenia		Yes						Yes		Yes	Yes			Yes		5
South Africa								Yes								1
Spain	Yes	Yes			Yes			Yes	Yes		Yes	Yes				7
Sri Lanka			Yes													1
Sudan			Yes													1
Sweden			Yes	Yes	Yes							Yes				4
Switzerland			Yes						Yes							2
Tajikistan			Yes	Yes	Yes		Yes									4
Thailand									Yes							1
Trinidad and Tobago														Yes		1
Tunisia										Yes		Yes		Yes		3
Turkey	Yes		Yes	Yes	Yes			Yes						Yes		6
Turkmenistan									Yes							1
Ukraine	Yes	Yes			Yes		Yes	Yes					Yes	Yes		7
United Arab Emirates			Yes			Yes										2
United States					Yes				Yes				Yes	Yes		4
Uruguay				Yes												1
Uzbekistan	Yes	Yes	Yes	Yes	Yes	Yes	Yes		Yes		Yes	Yes			Yes	10
Vanuatu				Yes												1
Venezuela											Yes	Yes	Yes			3
Vietnam									Yes							1
Yemen			Yes													1
Zambia		Yes														1
Total: 128 NOCs	23	27	35	35	33	25	22	28	29	25	31	28	24	27	12	392
References																

== Men's events ==
=== Extra-lightweight (60 kg) ===
Section	Places	NOC	Qualified judoka
Host nation	1	Japan	Naohisa Takato
IJF World Ranking List (as of June 28, 2021)	18	ROC	Robert Mshvidobadze
IJF World Ranking List (as of June 28, 2021)	18	Kazakhstan	Yeldos Smetov
IJF World Ranking List (as of June 28, 2021)	18	Spain	Francisco Garrigos
IJF World Ranking List (as of June 28, 2021)	18	Uzbekistan	Sharafuddin Lutfillaev
IJF World Ranking List (as of June 28, 2021)	18	South Korea	Kim Won-jin
IJF World Ranking List (as of June 28, 2021)	18	Georgia	Lukhumi Chkhvimiani
IJF World Ranking List (as of June 28, 2021)	18	Chinese Taipei	Yang Yung-wei
IJF World Ranking List (as of June 28, 2021)	18	Netherlands	Tornike Tsjakadoea
IJF World Ranking List (as of June 28, 2021)	18	Brazil	Eric Takabatake
IJF World Ranking List (as of June 28, 2021)	18	Belgium	Jorre Verstraeten
IJF World Ranking List (as of June 28, 2021)	18	Great Britain	Ashley McKenzie
IJF World Ranking List (as of June 28, 2021)	18	Azerbaijan	Karamat Huseynov
IJF World Ranking List (as of June 28, 2021)	18	France	Luka Mkheidze
IJF World Ranking List (as of June 28, 2021)	18	Mongolia	Amartuvshin Dashdavaa
IJF World Ranking List (as of June 28, 2021)	18	Ecuador	Lenin Preciado
IJF World Ranking List (as of June 28, 2021)	18	Ukraine	Artem Lesiuk
IJF World Ranking List (as of June 28, 2021)	18	Bulgaria	Yanislav Gerchev
IJF World Ranking List (as of June 28, 2021)	18	Germany	Moritz Plafky
Additional places (Europe)	1	Turkey	Mihraç Akkuş
Additional places (Africa)	—	—N/a	
Additional places (America)	1	Guatemala	José Ramos
Additional places (Asia)	1	Laos	Soukphaxay Sithisane
Additional places (Oceania)	—	—N/a	
Invitational	1	Bhutan	Ngawang Namgyel
Total	23		

=== Half-lightweight (66 kg) ===
Section	Places	NOC	Qualified judoka
Host nation	1	Japan	Hifumi Abe
IJF World Ranking List (as of June 28, 2021)	18	Italy	Manuel Lombardo
IJF World Ranking List (as of June 28, 2021)	18	South Korea	An Baul
IJF World Ranking List (as of June 28, 2021)	18	Georgia	Vazha Margvelashvili
IJF World Ranking List (as of June 28, 2021)	18	Mongolia	Baskhuu Yondonperenlei
IJF World Ranking List (as of June 28, 2021)	18	Israel	Baruch Shmailov
IJF World Ranking List (as of June 28, 2021)	18	Spain	Alberto Gaitero Martin
IJF World Ranking List (as of June 28, 2021)	18	Uzbekistan	Sardor Nurillaev
IJF World Ranking List (as of June 28, 2021)	18	ROC	Yakub Shamilov
IJF World Ranking List (as of June 28, 2021)	18	Brazil	Daniel Cargnin
IJF World Ranking List (as of June 28, 2021)	18	Kazakhstan	Yerlan Serikzhanov
IJF World Ranking List (as of June 28, 2021)	18	Moldova	Denis Vieru
IJF World Ranking List (as of June 28, 2021)	18	Azerbaijan	Orkhan Safarov
IJF World Ranking List (as of June 28, 2021)	18	Egypt	Mohamed Abdelmawgoud
IJF World Ranking List (as of June 28, 2021)	18	Ukraine	Georgii Zantaraia
IJF World Ranking List (as of June 28, 2021)	18	France	Kilian Le Blouch
IJF World Ranking List (as of June 28, 2021)	18	Slovenia	Adrian Gomboc
IJF World Ranking List (as of June 28, 2021)	18	Belarus	Dzmitry Minkou
IJF World Ranking List (as of June 28, 2021)	18	Germany	Sebastian Seidl
Additional places (Europe)	—	—N/a	
Additional places (Africa)	3	Zambia	Steven Mungandu
Additional places (Africa)	3	Mozambique	Kevin Loforte
Additional places (Africa)	3	Niger	Ismael Alhassane
Additional places (America)	2	Peru	Juan Postigos
Additional places (America)	2	Costa Rica	Ian Sancho Chinchila
Additional places (Asia)	1	Qatar	Ayoub Elidrissi
Additional places (Oceania)	1	Australia	Nathan Katz
Invitational	1	Albania	Indrit Cullhaj
Total	27		

=== Lightweight (73 kg) ===
Section	Places	NOC	Qualified judoka
Host nation	1	Japan	Shohei Ono
IJF World Ranking List (as of June 28, 2021)	18	Azerbaijan	Rustam Orujov
IJF World Ranking List (as of June 28, 2021)	18	Georgia	Lasha Shavdatuashvili
IJF World Ranking List (as of June 28, 2021)	18	South Korea	An Changrim
IJF World Ranking List (as of June 28, 2021)	18	Sweden	Tommy Macias
IJF World Ranking List (as of June 28, 2021)	18	Mongolia	Tsogtbaatar Tsend-Ochir
IJF World Ranking List (as of June 28, 2021)	18	Israel	Tohar Butbul
IJF World Ranking List (as of June 28, 2021)	18	Canada	Arthur Margelidon
IJF World Ranking List (as of June 28, 2021)	18	Turkey	Bilal Çiloğlu
IJF World Ranking List (as of June 28, 2021)	18	Uzbekistan	Khikmatillokh Turaev
IJF World Ranking List (as of June 28, 2021)	18	Kosovo	Akil Gjakova
IJF World Ranking List (as of June 28, 2021)	18	Italy	Fabio Basile
IJF World Ranking List (as of June 28, 2021)	18	ROC	Musa Mogushkov
IJF World Ranking List (as of June 28, 2021)	18	Tajikistan	Somon Makhmadbekov
IJF World Ranking List (as of June 28, 2021)	18	Kazakhstan	Zhansay Smagulov
IJF World Ranking List (as of June 28, 2021)	18	United Arab Emirates	Victor Scvortov
IJF World Ranking List (as of June 28, 2021)	18	Germany	Igor Wandtke
IJF World Ranking List (as of June 28, 2021)	18	Moldova	Victor Sterpu
IJF World Ranking List (as of June 28, 2021)	18	Switzerland	Nils Stump
Additional places (Europe)	3	France	Guillaume Chaine
Additional places (Europe)	3	Romania	Alexandru Raicu
Additional places (Europe)	3	Armenia	Ferdinand Karapetian
Additional places (Africa)	4	Algeria	Fethi Nourine
Additional places (Africa)	4	Djibouti	Aden-Alexandre Houssein
Additional places (Africa)	4	The Gambia	Faye Njie
Additional places (Africa)	4	Burkina Faso	Lucas Diallo
Additional places (America)	2	Cuba	Magdiel Estrada
Additional places (America)	2	Brazil	Eduardo Barbosa
Additional places (Asia)	2	Jordan	Younis Eyal Slman
Additional places (Asia)	2	Saudi Arabia	Sulaiman Hamad
Additional places (Oceania)	—	—N/a	
Invitational	5	Monaco	Cédric Bessi
Invitational	5	~~Guinea~~	~~Mamadou Samba Bah~~
Invitational	5	Yemen	Ahmed Ayash
Invitational	5	Refugee Olympic Team	Ahmad Alikaj
Invitational	5	Sri Lanka	Chamara Dharmawardana
Invitational	5	Sudan	Mohamed Abdalarasool
Total	35		

=== Half-middleweight (81 kg) ===
Section	Places	NOC	Qualified judoka
Host nation	1	Japan	Takanori Nagase
IJF World Ranking List (as of June 28, 2021)	18	Belgium	Matthias Casse
IJF World Ranking List (as of June 28, 2021)	18	Israel	Sagi Muki
IJF World Ranking List (as of June 28, 2021)	18	Georgia	Tato Grigalashvili
IJF World Ranking List (as of June 28, 2021)	18	Turkey	Vedat Albayrak
IJF World Ranking List (as of June 28, 2021)	18	Netherlands	Frank de Wit
IJF World Ranking List (as of June 28, 2021)	18	Mongolia	Saeid Mollaei
IJF World Ranking List (as of June 28, 2021)	18	Uzbekistan	Sharofiddin Boltaboev
IJF World Ranking List (as of June 28, 2021)	18	ROC	Alan Khubetsov
IJF World Ranking List (as of June 28, 2021)	18	Canada	Antoine Valois-Fortier
IJF World Ranking List (as of June 28, 2021)	18	Germany	Dominic Ressel
IJF World Ranking List (as of June 28, 2021)	18	Bulgaria	Ivaylo Ivanov
IJF World Ranking List (as of June 28, 2021)	18	Italy	Christian Parlati
IJF World Ranking List (as of June 28, 2021)	18	Hungary	Attila Ungvári
IJF World Ranking List (as of June 28, 2021)	18	Portugal	Anri Egutidze
IJF World Ranking List (as of June 28, 2021)	18	Greece	Alexios Ntanatsidis
IJF World Ranking List (as of June 28, 2021)	18	Austria	Shamil Borchashvili
IJF World Ranking List (as of June 28, 2021)	18	Azerbaijan	Murad Fatiyev
IJF World Ranking List (as of June 28, 2021)	18	Brazil	Eduardo Yudy Santos
Additional places (Europe)	1	Sweden	Robin Pacek
Additional places (Africa)	1	Egypt	Mohamed Abdelaal
Additional places (America)	3	Puerto Rico	Adrián Gandía
Additional places (America)	3	Argentina	Emmanuel Lucenti
Additional places (America)	3	Uruguay	Alain Mikael Aprahamian
Additional places (Asia)	4	Kyrgyzstan	Vladimir Zoloev
Additional places (Asia)	4	Kazakhstan	Didar Khamza
Additional places (Asia)	4	Tajikistan	Akmal Murodov
Additional places (Asia)	4	Lebanon	Nacif Elias
Additional places (Oceania)	3	Guam	Joshter Andrew
Additional places (Oceania)	3	Samoa	Peniamina Percival
Additional places (Oceania)	3	Vanuatu	Hugo Cumbo
Invitational	3	Palestine	Wesam Abu Rmilah
Invitational	3	Comoros	Housni Thaoubani
Invitational	3	Sierra Leone	Frederick Harris
Re-allocation of unused quota	1	South Korea	Lee Sung-ho
Total	35		

=== Middleweight (90 kg) ===
Section	Places	NOC	Qualified judoka
Host nation	1	Japan	Shoichiro Mukai
IJF World Ranking List (as of June 28, 2021)	18	Spain	Nikoloz Sherazadishvili
IJF World Ranking List (as of June 28, 2021)	18	Netherlands	Noël van 't End
IJF World Ranking List (as of June 28, 2021)	18	Hungary	Krisztián Tóth
IJF World Ranking List (as of June 28, 2021)	18	Georgia	Lasha Bekauri
IJF World Ranking List (as of June 28, 2021)	18	Uzbekistan	Davlat Bobonov
IJF World Ranking List (as of June 28, 2021)	18	Serbia	Nemanja Majdov
IJF World Ranking List (as of June 28, 2021)	18	Cuba	Iván Felipe Silva Morales
IJF World Ranking List (as of June 28, 2021)	18	ROC	Mikhail Igolnikov
IJF World Ranking List (as of June 28, 2021)	18	Sweden	Marcus Nyman
IJF World Ranking List (as of June 28, 2021)	18	Azerbaijan	Mammadali Mehdiyev
IJF World Ranking List (as of June 28, 2021)	18	Turkey	Mihael Žgank
IJF World Ranking List (as of June 28, 2021)	18	Germany	Eduard Trippel
IJF World Ranking List (as of June 28, 2021)	18	South Korea	Gwak Dong-han
IJF World Ranking List (as of June 28, 2021)	18	France	Axel Clerget
IJF World Ranking List (as of June 28, 2021)	18	Mongolia	Altanbagana Gantulga
IJF World Ranking List (as of June 28, 2021)	18	Brazil	Rafael Macedo
IJF World Ranking List (as of June 28, 2021)	18	Kazakhstan	Islam Bozbayev
IJF World Ranking List (as of June 28, 2021)	18	Tajikistan	Komronshokh Ustopiriyon
Additional places (Europe)	5	Italy	Nicholas Mungai
Additional places (Europe)	5	Israel	Li Kochman
Additional places (Europe)	5	Czech Republic	David Klammert
Additional places (Europe)	5	Ukraine	Quedjau Nhabali
Additional places (Europe)	5	Poland	Piotr Kuczera
Additional places (Africa)	2	Mauritius	Rémi Feuillet
Additional places (Africa)	2	Ghana	Kwadjo Anani
Additional places (America)	2	United States	Colton Brown
Additional places (America)	2	Dominican Republic	Robert Florentino
Additional places (Asia)	—	—N/a	
Additional places (Oceania)	—	—N/a	
Invitational	5	Liechtenstein	Raphael Schwendinger
Invitational	5	Benin	Celtus Dossou Yovo
Invitational	5	Seychelles	Nantenaina Finesse
Invitational	5	San Marino	Paolo Persoglia
Invitational	5	Refugee Olympic Team	Popole Misenga
Total	33		

=== Half-heavyweight (100 kg) ===
Section	Places	NOC	Qualified judoka
Host nation	1	Japan	Aaron Wolf
IJF World Ranking List (as of June 28, 2021)	18	Georgia	Varlam Liparteliani
IJF World Ranking List (as of June 28, 2021)	18	Netherlands	Michael Korrel
IJF World Ranking List (as of June 28, 2021)	18	Portugal	Jorge Fonseca
IJF World Ranking List (as of June 28, 2021)	18	Israel	Peter Paltchik
IJF World Ranking List (as of June 28, 2021)	18	South Korea	Cho Gu-ham
IJF World Ranking List (as of June 28, 2021)	18	ROC	Niyaz Ilyasov
IJF World Ranking List (as of June 28, 2021)	18	Canada	Shady El Nahas
IJF World Ranking List (as of June 28, 2021)	18	Azerbaijan	Zelym Kotsoiev
IJF World Ranking List (as of June 28, 2021)	18	France	Alexandre Iddir
IJF World Ranking List (as of June 28, 2021)	18	Egypt	Ramadan Darwish
IJF World Ranking List (as of June 28, 2021)	18	Uzbekistan	Mukhammadkarim Khurramov
IJF World Ranking List (as of June 28, 2021)	18	Mongolia	Lkhagvasürengiin Otgonbaatar
IJF World Ranking List (as of June 28, 2021)	18	Belgium	Toma Nikiforov
IJF World Ranking List (as of June 28, 2021)	18	Brazil	Rafael Buzacarini
IJF World Ranking List (as of June 28, 2021)	18	Ireland	Benjamin Fletcher
IJF World Ranking List (as of June 28, 2021)	18	Germany	Karl-Richard Frey
IJF World Ranking List (as of June 28, 2021)	18	Estonia	Grigori Minaškin
IJF World Ranking List (as of June 28, 2021)	18	Serbia	Aleksandar Kukolj
Additional places (Europe)	3	Belarus	Mikita Sviryd
Additional places (Europe)	3	Latvia	Jevgeņijs Borodavko
Additional places (Europe)	3	Hungary	Miklós Cirjenics
Additional places (Africa)	—	—N/a	
Additional places (America)	—	—N/a	
Additional places (Asia)	2	Pakistan	Hussain Shah Shah
Additional places (Asia)	2	United Arab Emirates	Ivan Remarenco
Additional places (Oceania)	1	Fiji	Tevita Takayawa
Invitational			
Total	25		

=== Heavyweight (+100 kg) ===
as per June 14 2021 Source:

Section	Places	NOC	Qualified judoka
Host nation	1	Japan	Hisayoshi Harasawa
IJF World Ranking List (as of June 28, 2021)	18	ROC	Tamerlan Bashaev
IJF World Ranking List (as of June 28, 2021)	18	Czech Republic	Lukáš Krpálek
IJF World Ranking List (as of June 28, 2021)	18	Georgia	Guram Tushishvili
IJF World Ranking List (as of June 28, 2021)	18	Brazil	Rafael Silva
IJF World Ranking List (as of June 28, 2021)	18	Netherlands	Henk Grol
IJF World Ranking List (as of June 28, 2021)	18	Ukraine	Yakiv Khammo
IJF World Ranking List (as of June 28, 2021)	18	Israel	Or Sasson
IJF World Ranking List (as of June 28, 2021)	18	South Korea	Kim Min-jong
IJF World Ranking List (as of June 28, 2021)	18	France	Teddy Riner
IJF World Ranking List (as of June 28, 2021)	18	Tajikistan	Temur Rakhimov
IJF World Ranking List (as of June 28, 2021)	18	Azerbaijan	Ushangi Kokauri
IJF World Ranking List (as of June 28, 2021)	18	Austria	Stephan Hegyi
IJF World Ranking List (as of June 28, 2021)	18	Cuba	Andy Granda
IJF World Ranking List (as of June 28, 2021)	18	Uzbekistan	Bekmurod Oltiboev
IJF World Ranking List (as of June 28, 2021)	18	Germany	Johannes Frey
IJF World Ranking List (as of June 28, 2021)	18	Romania	Vlăduț Simionescu
IJF World Ranking List (as of June 28, 2021)	18	Mongolia	Duurenbayar Ulziibayar
IJF World Ranking List (as of June 28, 2021)	18	Poland	Maciej Sarnacki
Additional places (Europe)	—	—N/a	
Additional places (Africa)	2	Senegal	Mbagnick Ndiaye
Additional places (Africa)	2	Libya	Ali Omar
Additional places (America)	—	—N/a	
Additional places (Asia)	—	—N/a	
Additional places (Oceania)	—	—N/a	
Invitational	1	Refugee Olympic Team	Javad Mahjoub
Total	22		

== Women's events ==
=== Extra-lightweight (48 kg) ===
Section	Places	NOC	Qualified judoka
Host nation	1	Japan	Funa Tonaki
IJF World Ranking List (as of June 28, 2021)	18	Kosovo	Distria Krasniqi
IJF World Ranking List (as of June 28, 2021)	18	Ukraine	Daria Bilodid
IJF World Ranking List (as of June 28, 2021)	18	Mongolia	Urantsetseg Munkhbat
IJF World Ranking List (as of June 28, 2021)	18	Argentina	Paula Pareto
IJF World Ranking List (as of June 28, 2021)	18	Spain	Julia Figueroa
IJF World Ranking List (as of June 28, 2021)	18	Portugal	Catarina Costa
IJF World Ranking List (as of June 28, 2021)	18	ROC	Irina Dolgova
IJF World Ranking List (as of June 28, 2021)	18	France	Shirine Boukli
IJF World Ranking List (as of June 28, 2021)	18	Slovenia	Maruša Štangar
IJF World Ranking List (as of June 28, 2021)	18	Kazakhstan	Galbadrakhyn Otgontsetseg
IJF World Ranking List (as of June 28, 2021)	18	Israel	Shira Rishony
IJF World Ranking List (as of June 28, 2021)	18	Serbia	Milica Nikolić
IJF World Ranking List (as of June 28, 2021)	18	Italy	Francesca Milani
IJF World Ranking List (as of June 28, 2021)	18	Germany	Katharina Menz
IJF World Ranking List (as of June 28, 2021)	18	China	Li Yanan
IJF World Ranking List (as of June 28, 2021)	18	Hungary	Éva Csernoviczki
IJF World Ranking List (as of June 28, 2021)	18	South Korea	Kang Yu-jeong
IJF World Ranking List (as of June 28, 2021)	18	Brazil	Gabriela Chibana
Additional places (Europe)	2	Turkey	Gülkader Şentürk
Additional places (Europe)	2	Azerbaijan	Aisha Gurbanli
Additional places (Africa)	2	South Africa	Geronay Whitebooi
Additional places (Africa)	2	Mauritius	Priscilla Morand
Additional places (America)	1	Chile	Mary Dee Vargas Lee
Additional places (Asia)	2	Chinese Taipei	Chen-Hao Lin
Additional places (Asia)	2	India	Shushila Devi Likmabam
Additional places (Oceania)	—	—N/a	
Invitational	2	Malawi	Harriet Boniface
Invitational	2	Nepal	Soniya Bhatta
Total	28		

=== Half-lightweight (52 kg) ===
Section	Places	NOC	Qualified judoka
Host nation	1	Japan	Uta Abe
IJF World Ranking List (as of June 28, 2021)	18	France	Amandine Buchard
IJF World Ranking List (as of June 28, 2021)	18	Italy	Odette Giuffrida
IJF World Ranking List (as of June 28, 2021)	18	Kosovo	Majlinda Kelmendi
IJF World Ranking List (as of June 28, 2021)	18	Spain	Ana Perez Box
IJF World Ranking List (as of June 28, 2021)	18	Belgium	Charline van Snick
IJF World Ranking List (as of June 28, 2021)	18	Great Britain	Chelsie Giles
IJF World Ranking List (as of June 28, 2021)	18	ROC	Natalia Kuziutina
IJF World Ranking List (as of June 28, 2021)	18	Uzbekistan	Diyora Keldiyorova
IJF World Ranking List (as of June 28, 2021)	18	Israel	Gili Cohen
IJF World Ranking List (as of June 28, 2021)	18	Brazil	Larissa Pimenta
IJF World Ranking List (as of June 28, 2021)	18	Switzerland	Fabienne Kocher
IJF World Ranking List (as of June 28, 2021)	18	Portugal	Joana Ramos
IJF World Ranking List (as of June 28, 2021)	18	Mongolia	Sosorbaram Lkhagvasuren
IJF World Ranking List (as of June 28, 2021)	18	Hungary	Réka Pupp
IJF World Ranking List (as of June 28, 2021)	18	United States	Angelica Delgado
IJF World Ranking List (as of June 28, 2021)	18	South Korea	Park Da-sol
IJF World Ranking List (as of June 28, 2021)	18	Romania	Andreea Chitu
IJF World Ranking List (as of June 28, 2021)	18	Poland	Agatha Perenc
Additional places (Europe)	1	Georgia	Tetiana Levytska-Shukvani
Additional places (Africa)	2	Guinea-Bissau	Taciana Cesar
Additional places (Africa)	2	Morocco	Soumiya Iraoui
Additional places (America)	3	Canada	Ecaterina Guica
Additional places (America)	3	Panama	Kristine Jiménez
Additional places (America)	3	Haiti	Sabiana Anestor
Additional places (Asia)	2	Turkmenistan	Gulbadam Babamuratova
Additional places (Asia)	2	Thailand	Kachakorn Warasiha
Additional places (Oceania)	—	—N/a	
Invitational	1	North Macedonia	Arbresha Rexhepi
Re-allocation of unused quota place	1	Vietnam	Nguyễn Thủy
Total	29		

=== Lightweight (57 kg) ===
Section	Places	NOC	Qualified judoka
Host nation	1	Japan	Tsukasa Yoshida
IJF World Ranking List (as of June 28, 2021)	18	Canada	Jessica Klimkait
IJF World Ranking List (as of June 28, 2021)	18	Kosovo	Nora Gjakova
IJF World Ranking List (as of June 28, 2021)	18	France	Sarah-Léonie Cysique
IJF World Ranking List (as of June 28, 2021)	18	Germany	Theresa Stoll
IJF World Ranking List (as of June 28, 2021)	18	Chinese Taipei	Lien Chen-ling
IJF World Ranking List (as of June 28, 2021)	18	Israel	Timna Nelson-Levy
IJF World Ranking List (as of June 28, 2021)	18	Portugal	Telma Monteiro
IJF World Ranking List (as of June 28, 2021)	18	Hungary	Hedvig Karakas
IJF World Ranking List (as of June 28, 2021)	18	Mongolia	Sumiya Dorjsuren
IJF World Ranking List (as of June 28, 2021)	18	Poland	Julia Kowalczyk
IJF World Ranking List (as of June 28, 2021)	18	Slovenia	Kaja Kajzer
IJF World Ranking List (as of June 28, 2021)	18	ROC	Daria Mezhetskaia
IJF World Ranking List (as of June 28, 2021)	18	Georgia	Eteri Liparteliani
IJF World Ranking List (as of June 28, 2021)	18	Serbia	Marica Perišić
IJF World Ranking List (as of June 28, 2021)	18	South Korea	Kim Ji-su
IJF World Ranking List (as of June 28, 2021)	18	China	Lu Tongjuan
IJF World Ranking List (as of June 28, 2021)	18	Bulgaria	Ivelina Ilieva
IJF World Ranking List (as of June 28, 2021)	18	Panama	Miryam Roper
Additional places (Europe)	2	Netherlands	Sanne Verhagen
Additional places (Europe)	2	Austria	Sabrina Filzmoser
Additional places (Africa)	3	Tunisia	Ghofran Khelifi
Additional places (Africa)	3	Angola	Diassonema Mucungui
Additional places (Africa)	3	Ivory Coast	Zouleiha Abzetta Dabonne
Additional places (America)	—	—N/a	
Additional places (Asia)	—	—N/a	
Additional places (Oceania)	—	—N/a	
Invitational	1	Refugee Olympic Team	Sanda Aldass
Total	25		

=== Half-middleweight (63 kg) ===
Section	Places	NOC	Qualified judoka
Host nation	1	Japan	Miku Tashiro
IJF World Ranking List (as of June 28, 2021)	18	France	Clarisse Agbegnenou
IJF World Ranking List (as of June 28, 2021)	18	Slovenia	Tina Trstenjak
IJF World Ranking List (as of June 28, 2021)	18	Canada	Catherine Beauchemin-Pinard
IJF World Ranking List (as of June 28, 2021)	18	Brazil	Ketleyn Quadros
IJF World Ranking List (as of June 28, 2021)	18	Germany	Martyna Trajdos
IJF World Ranking List (as of June 28, 2021)	18	Cuba	Maylín del Toro Carvajal
IJF World Ranking List (as of June 28, 2021)	18	Netherlands	Juul Franssen
IJF World Ranking List (as of June 28, 2021)	18	Venezuela	Anriquelis Barrios
IJF World Ranking List (as of June 28, 2021)	18	ROC	Daria Davydova
IJF World Ranking List (as of June 28, 2021)	18	China	Yang Junxia
IJF World Ranking List (as of June 28, 2021)	18	Austria	Magdalena Krssakova
IJF World Ranking List (as of June 28, 2021)	18	Great Britain	Lucy Renshall
IJF World Ranking List (as of June 28, 2021)	18	Australia	Katharina Haecker
IJF World Ranking List (as of June 28, 2021)	18	Mongolia	Gankhaich Bold
IJF World Ranking List (as of June 28, 2021)	18	Poland	Agata Ozdoba-Błach
IJF World Ranking List (as of June 28, 2021)	18	Hungary	Szofi Özbas
IJF World Ranking List (as of June 28, 2021)	18	Israel	Gili Sharir
IJF World Ranking List (as of June 28, 2021)	18	Italy	Maria Centracchio
Additional places (Europe)	3	Serbia	Anja Obradović
Additional places (Europe)	3	Spain	Cristina Cabaña Perez
Additional places (Europe)	3	Denmark	Lærke Olsen
Additional places (Africa)	2	Madagascar	Damiella Nomenjanahary
Additional places (Africa)	2	Cape Verde	Sandrine Billiet
Additional places (America)	2	Mexico	Prisca Awiti Alcaraz
Additional places (America)	2	Ecuador	Estefania Garcia
Additional places (Asia)	3	South Korea	Han Hee-ju
Additional places (Asia)	3	Philippines	Kiyomi Watanabe
Additional places (Asia)	3	Uzbekistan	Farangiz Khojieva
Additional places (Oceania)	—	—N/a	
Invitational	2	Refugee Olympic Team	Muna Dahouk
Invitational	2	Honduras	Cergia David
Total	31		

=== Middleweight (70 kg) ===
Section	Places	NOC	Qualified judoka
Host nation	1	Japan	Chizuru Arai
IJF World Ranking List (as of June 28, 2021)	18	Netherlands	Sanne van Dijke
IJF World Ranking List (as of June 28, 2021)	18	France	Margaux Pinot
IJF World Ranking List (as of June 28, 2021)	18	Croatia	Barbara Matić
IJF World Ranking List (as of June 28, 2021)	18	Austria	Michaela Polleres
IJF World Ranking List (as of June 28, 2021)	18	Germany	Giovanna Scoccimarro
IJF World Ranking List (as of June 28, 2021)	18	Brazil	Maria Portela
IJF World Ranking List (as of June 28, 2021)	18	Sweden	Anna Bernholm
IJF World Ranking List (as of June 28, 2021)	18	ROC	Madina Taimazova
IJF World Ranking List (as of June 28, 2021)	18	Portugal	Barbara Timo
IJF World Ranking List (as of June 28, 2021)	18	Great Britain	Gemma Howell
IJF World Ranking List (as of June 28, 2021)	18	Venezuela	Elvismar Rodriguez
IJF World Ranking List (as of June 28, 2021)	18	Spain	María Bernabéu
IJF World Ranking List (as of June 28, 2021)	18	Puerto Rico	María Pérez
IJF World Ranking List (as of June 28, 2021)	18	Ireland	Megan Fletcher
IJF World Ranking List (as of June 28, 2021)	18	Morocco	Assmaa Niang
IJF World Ranking List (as of June 28, 2021)	18	Uzbekistan	Gulnoza Matniyazova
IJF World Ranking List (as of June 28, 2021)	18	Australia	Aoife Coughlan
IJF World Ranking List (as of June 28, 2021)	18	Greece	Elisavet Teltsidou
Additional places (Europe)	1	Italy	Alice Bellandi
Additional places (Africa)	2	Cameroon	Ayuk Otay Arrey Sophina
Additional places (Africa)	2	Chad	Demos Memneloum
Additional places (America)	1	Jamaica	Ebony Drysdale Daley
Additional places (Asia)	2	South Korea	Kim Seong-yeon
Additional places (Asia)	2	China	Sun Xiaoqian
Additional places (Oceania)	1	Kiribati	Kinaua Biribo
Invitational	1	Refugee Olympic Team	Nigara Shaheen
Re-allocation of unused quota place	1	Tunisia	Nihel Landolsi
Total	28		

=== Half-heavyweight (78 kg) ===
Section	Places	NOC	Qualified judoka
Host nation	1	Japan	Shori Hamada
IJF World Ranking List (as of June 28, 2021)	18	France	Madeleine Malonga
IJF World Ranking List (as of June 28, 2021)	18	Germany	Anna-Maria Wagner
IJF World Ranking List (as of June 28, 2021)	18	Netherlands	Guusje Steenhuis
IJF World Ranking List (as of June 28, 2021)	18	Great Britain	Natalie Powell
IJF World Ranking List (as of June 28, 2021)	18	Brazil	Mayra Aguiar
IJF World Ranking List (as of June 28, 2021)	18	Kosovo	Loriana Kuka
IJF World Ranking List (as of June 28, 2021)	18	Cuba	Kaliema Antomarchi
IJF World Ranking List (as of June 28, 2021)	18	China	Ma Zhenzhao
IJF World Ranking List (as of June 28, 2021)	18	Poland	Beata Pacut
IJF World Ranking List (as of June 28, 2021)	18	Austria	Bernadette Graf
IJF World Ranking List (as of June 28, 2021)	18	Portugal	Patricia Sampaio
IJF World Ranking List (as of June 28, 2021)	18	ROC	Aleksandra Babintseva
IJF World Ranking List (as of June 28, 2021)	18	Ecuador	Vanessa Chalá
IJF World Ranking List (as of June 28, 2021)	18	Croatia	Karla Prodan
IJF World Ranking List (as of June 28, 2021)	18	South Korea	Yoon Hyun-ji
IJF World Ranking List (as of June 28, 2021)	18	Ukraine	Anastasiya Turchyn
IJF World Ranking List (as of June 28, 2021)	18	Israel	Inbar Lanir
IJF World Ranking List (as of June 28, 2021)	18	United States	Nefeli Papadakis
Additional places (Europe)	—	—N/a	
Additional places (Africa)	2	Gabon	Sarah-Myriam Mazouz
Additional places (Africa)	2	Democratic Republic of the Congo	Marie Branser
Additional places (America)	1	Venezuela	Karen León
Additional places (Asia)	1	Mongolia	Otgony Mönkhtsetseg
Additional places (Oceania)	—	—N/a	
Invitational	1	Montenegro	Jovana Peković
Total	24		

=== Heavyweight (+78 kg) ===
Section	Places	NOC	Qualified judoka
Host nation	1	Japan	Akira Sone
IJF World Ranking List (as of June 28, 2021)	18	Cuba	Idalys Ortiz
IJF World Ranking List (as of June 28, 2021)	18	Azerbaijan	Iryna Kindzerska
IJF World Ranking List (as of June 28, 2021)	18	Brazil	Maria Suelen Altheman
IJF World Ranking List (as of June 28, 2021)	18	France	Romane Dicko
IJF World Ranking List (as of June 28, 2021)	18	Turkey	Kayra Sayit
IJF World Ranking List (as of June 28, 2021)	18	Belarus	Maryna Slutskaya
IJF World Ranking List (as of June 28, 2021)	18	Tunisia	Nihel Cheikh Rouhou
IJF World Ranking List (as of June 28, 2021)	18	Portugal	Rochele Nunes
IJF World Ranking List (as of June 28, 2021)	18	Bosnia and Herzegovina	Larisa Cerić
IJF World Ranking List (as of June 28, 2021)	18	China	Xu Shiyan
IJF World Ranking List (as of June 28, 2021)	18	Cameroon	Hortence Vanessa Mballa Atangana
IJF World Ranking List (as of June 28, 2021)	18	Ukraine	Yelyzaveta Kalanina
IJF World Ranking List (as of June 28, 2021)	18	South Korea	Kim Ha-yun
IJF World Ranking List (as of June 28, 2021)	18	Netherlands	Tessie Savelkouls
IJF World Ranking List (as of June 28, 2021)	18	Israel	Raz Hershko
IJF World Ranking List (as of June 28, 2021)	18	Puerto Rico	Melissa Mojica
IJF World Ranking List (as of June 28, 2021)	18	Slovenia	Anamari Velenšek
IJF World Ranking List (as of June 28, 2021)	18	Germany	Jasmin Grabowski
Additional places (Europe)	3	Lithuania	Sandra Jablonskytė
Additional places (Europe)	3	Great Britain	Sarah Adlington
Additional places (Europe)	3	Croatia	Ivana Maranić
Additional places (Africa)	1	Algeria	Sonia Asselah
Additional places (America)	2	Trinidad and Tobago	Gabriella Wood
Additional places (America)	2	Nicaragua	Izayana Marenco
Additional places (Asia)	1	Saudi Arabia	Tahani Alqahtani
Additional places (Oceania)	—	—N/a	
Re-allocation of unused quota place	1	United States	Nina Cutro-Kelly
Total	27		

== Continental quotas ==
=== Africa ===
Men

Weight	NOC	Qualified judoka	Points
-81	Egypt	Mohamed Abdelaal	2631
-73	Algeria	Fehti Nourine	2262
+100	Senegal	Mbagnick Ndiaye	2035
-73	The Gambia	Faye Njie	1487
-90	Mauritius	Rémi Feuillet	1279
-73	Djibouti	Aden-Alexandre Houssein	1105
-66	Zambia	Steven Mungandu	960
-66	Mozambique	Kevin Loforte	807
-81	Ghana	Kwadjo Anani	506
+100	Libya	Ali Omar	460
-66	Niger	Ismael Alhassane	381
-73	Burkina Faso	Lucas Diallo	353

Women

Weight	NOC	Qualified judoka	Points
-57	Tunisia	Ghofran Khelifi	2362
-52	Guinea-Bissau	Taciana Cesar	2249
-52	Morocco	Soumiya Iraoui	2065
-78	Gabon	Sarah-Myriam Mazouz	1760
-57	Angola	Diassonema Mucungui	1657
-57	Ivory Coast	Zouleiha Abzetta Dabonne	1654
-48	South Africa	Geronay Whitebooi	1536
-78	Democratic Republic of the Congo	Marie Branser	1290
-70	Cameroon	Ayuk Otay Arrey Sophina	1213
-63	Cape Verde	Sandrine Billiet	878
-70	Chad	Demos Memneloum	779
-63	Madagascar	Damiella Nomenjanahary	647

=== America ===
Men

Weight	NOC	Qualified judoka	Points
-73	Cuba	Magdiel Estrada	2649
-90	United States	Colton Brown	2453
-90	Dominican Republic	Robert Florentino	2312
-81	Puerto Rico	Adrián Gandía	2134
-73	Brazil	Eduardo Barbosa	2096
-66	Peru	Juan Postigos	1843
-81	Argentina	Emmanuel Lucenti	1383
-60	Guatemala	José Ramos	930
-66	Costa Rica	Ian Sancho Chinchila	814
-81	Uruguay	Alain Mikael Aprahamian	585

Women

Weight	NOC	Qualified judoka	Points
-70	Colombia	Yuri Alvear	2856
-52	Canada	Ecaterina Guica	2551
-63	Mexico	Prisca Awiti Alcaraz	2227
-48	Chile	Mary Dee Vargas	2102
-63	Ecuador	Estefania Garcia	1493
-78	Venezuela	Karen León	1466
-52	Panama	Kristine Jiménez	732
-70	Jamaica	Ebony Drysdale Daley	578
+78	Trinidad and Tobago	Gabriella Wood	268
+78	Nicaragua	Izayana Marenco	187
-52	Haiti	Sabiana Anestor	167
-57	Bahamas	Cynthia Rahming	151

=== Asia ===
Men

Weight	NOC	Qualified judoka	Points
-81	Kyrgyzstan	Vladimir Zoloev	2380
-81	Kazakhstan	Didar Khamza	2222
-100	Pakistan	Hussain Shah	1208
-81	Tajikistan	Akmal Murodov	1060
-100	United Arab Emirates	Ivan Remarenco	1028
-73	Saudi Arabia	Sulaiman Hammad	818
-66	Qatar	Ayoub Elidrissi	689
-81	Lebanon	Nacif Elias	646
-73	Jordan	Younis Eyal Slman	445
-60	Laos	Soukphaxay Sithisane	318

Women

Weight	NOC	Qualified judoka	Points
-70	South Korea	Kim Seong-yeon	2794
-63	South Korea	Han Hee-ju (Note: Remaining quota)	2314
-70	China	Sun Xiaoqian	1834
-48	Azerbaijan	Aisha Gurbanli	1753
-48	Chinese Taipei	Chen-Hao Lin	1508
-63	Philippines	Kiyomi Watanabe	1496
-52	Turkmenistan	Gulbadam Babamuratova	1161
-52	Thailand	Kachakorn Warasiha	1038
-48	India	Shushila Devi Likmabam	989
-63	Uzbekistan	Farangiz Khojieva	662
-78	Mongolia	Munkhtsetseg Otgon	621

=== Europe ===
Men

Weight	NOC	Qualified judoka	Points
-90	Italy	Nicholas Mungai	2875
-90	Israel	Li Kochman	2837
-73	France	Guillaume Chaine	2694
-90	Czech Republic	David Klammert	2528
-90	Ukraine	Quedjau Nhabali	2495
-81	Sweden	Robin Pacek	2417
-73	Romania	Alexandru Raicu	2339
-100	Belarus	Mikita Sviryd	2247
-100	Latvia	Jevgeņijs Borodavko	2244
-100	Hungary	Miklós Cirjenics	2190
-60	Turkey	Mihraç Akkuş	2157
-73	Armenia	Ferdinand Karapetian	2148
-90	Poland	Piotr Kuczera	2103

Women

Weight	NOC	Qualified judoka	Points
-70	Greece	Elisavet Teltsidou	2842
-70	Italy	Alice Bellandi (Note: Remaining quota)	2533
-57	Netherlands	Sanne Verhagen	2337
+78	Germany	Jasmin Grabowski	2326
-57	Austria	Sabrina Filzmoser	1985
-63	Serbia	Anja Obradović	1872
+78	Lithuania	Sandra Jablonskyte	1825
-52	Georgia	Tetiana Levytska-Shukvani	1786
-48	Azerbaijan	Aisha Gurbanli	1753
-63	Spain	Cristina Cabaña Perez	1712
-63	Denmark	Lærke Olsen	1688

=== Oceania ===
Men

Weight	NOC	Qualified judoka	Points
-100	Australia	Kayhan Ozcicek-Takagi	1792
-100	Fiji	Tevita Takayawa	595
-81	Guam	Joshter Andrew	278
-81	Samoa	Peniamina Percival	76
-81	Vanuatu	Hugo Cumbo	62

Women

Weight	NOC	Qualified judoka	Points
-57	New Zealand	Justine Bishop	654
-70	Kiribati	Kinaua Biribo	10
+78	Papua New Guinea	Marie Keneke	6

== Mixed team ==
In order to qualify for mixed team competition, an NOC had to have individual competitors in each of six groups of divisions:

- Men's lower third (extra-lightweight, half-lightweight, or lightweight)
- Men's middle third (lightweight, half-middleweight, or middleweight)
- Men's upper third (middleweight, half-heavyweight, or heavyweight)
- Women's lower third (extra-lightweight, half-lightweight, or lightweight)
- Women's middle third (lightweight, half-middleweight, or middleweight)
- Women's upper third (middleweight, half-heavyweight, or heavyweight)

=== Male qualifiers ===
(#) Qualified male judoka
	Lower third				Upper third			# of judokas
NOC	-60	-66	-73	-81	-90	-100	+100	# of judokas
Japan	2. Naohisa Takato	4. Hifumi Abe	11. Shohei Ono	13. Takanori Nagase	10. Shoichiro Mukai	5. Aaron Wolf	2. Hisayoshi Harasawa	7
Brazil	10. Eric Takabatake	10. Daniel Cargnin	25. Eduardo Barbosa	19. Eduardo Yudy Santos	17. Rafael Macedo	15. Rafael Buzacarini	5. Rafael Silva	7
France	14. Luka Mkheidze	16. Kilian Le Blouch	20. Guillaume Chaine	—	15. Axel Clerget	10. Alexandre Iddir	10. Teddy Riner	6
Germany	19. Moritz Plafky	19. Sebastian Seidl	17. Igor Wandtke	10. Dominic Ressel	13. Eduard Trippel	17. Karl-Richard Frey	16. Johannes Frey	7
Israel	—	6. Baruch Shmailov	6. Tohar Butbul	2. Sagi Muki	21. Li Kochman	4. Peter Paltchik	8. Or Sasson	6
Italy	—	1. Manuel Lombardo	12. Fabio Basile	12. Christian Parlati	20. Nicholas Mungai	—	—	4
Mongolia	15. Amartuvshin Dashdavaa	5. Baskhuu Yondonperenlei	5. Tsogtbaatar Tsend-Ochir	6. Saeid Mollaei	16. Altanbagana Gantulga	13. Lkhagvasürengiin Otgonbaatar	18. Duurenbayar Ulziibayar	7
Netherlands	9. Tornike Tsjakadoea	—	—	5. Frank de Wit	2. Noël van 't End	3. Michael Korrel	6. Henk Grol	5
South Korea	6. Kim Won-jin	2. An Baul	3. An Changrim	21. Lee Sung-ho	14. Gwak Dong-han	6. Cho Gu-ham	9. Kim Min-jong	7
Uzbekistan	5. Sharafuddin Lutfillaev	8. Sardor Nurillaev	9. Khikmatillokh Turaev	7. Sharofiddin Boltaboev	5. Davlat Bobonov	12. Mukhammadkarim Khurramov	15. Bekmurod Oltiboev	7
Refugee Olympic Team	—	—	34. Ahmad Alikaj	—	33. Popole Misenga	—	22. Javad Mahjoub	3
ROC	1. Robert Mshvidobadze	9. Yakub Shamilov	13. Musa Mogushkov	8. Alan Khubetsov	8. Mikhail Igolnikov	7. Niyaz Ilyasov	1. Tamerlan Bashaev	7
Total teams: 12	9	10	11	10	12	10	11	73
References								
			Middle third					

=== Female qualifiers ===
(#) Qualified female judoka
	Lower third				Upper third			
NOC	-48	-52	-57	-63	-70	-78	+78	# of judokas
Japan	3. Funa Tonaki	2. Uta Abe	2. Tsukasa Yoshida	3. Miku Tashiro	3. Chizuru Arai	2. Shori Hamada	3. Akira Sone	7
Brazil	19. Gabriela Chibana	11. Larissa Pimenta	—	5. Ketleyn Quadros	7. Maria Portela	6. Mayra Aguiar	4. Maria Suelen Altheman	6
France	9. Shirine Boukli	1. Amandine Buchard	4. Sarah-Léonie Cysique	1. Clarisse Agbegnenou	2. Margaux Pinot	1. Madeleine Malonga	5. Romane Dicko	7
Germany	15. Katharina Menz	—	5. Theresa Stoll	6. Martyna Trajdos	6. Giovanna Scoccimarro	3. Anna-Maria Wagner	19. Jasmin Grabowski	6
Israel	12. Shira Rishony	10. Gili Cohen	7. Timna Nelson-Levy	18. Gili Sharir	—	18. Inbar Lanir	16. Raz Hershko	6
Italy	14. Francesca Milani	3. Odette Giuffrida	—	19. Maria Centracchio	21. Alice Bellandi	—	—	4
Mongolia	4. Urantsetseg Munkhbat	13. Lkhagvasürengiin Sosorbaram	10. Sumiya Dorjsuren	15. Gankhaich Bold	—	23. Munkhtsetseg Otgon	—	5
Netherlands	—	—	21. Sanne Verhagen	8. Juul Franssen	1. Sanne van Dijke	4. Guusje Steenhuis	14. Tessie Savelkouls	5
South Korea	18. Kang Yu-jeong	17. Park Da-sol	16. Kim Ji-su	20. Han Hee-ju	20. Kim Seong-yeon	16. Yoon Hyun-ji	15. Han Mi-jin	7
Uzbekistan	—	9. Diyora Keldiyorova	—	29. Farangiz Khojieva	17. Gulnoza Matniyazova	—	—	3
Refugee Olympic Team	—	—	25. Sanda Aldass	30. Muna Dahouk	28. Nigara Shaheen	—	—	3
ROC	8. Irina Dolgova	8. Natalia Kuziutina	13. Daria Mezhetskaia	10. Daria Davydova	9. Madina Taimazova	13. Aleksandra Babintseva	—	6
Total teams: 12	9	9	9	12	10	9	7	65
References								
			Middle third					
