= 2020 European Judo Championships – Men's +100 kg =

Judo competition

Judo Men's +100 kg at the 2020 European Judo Championships
- Venue: O2 Arena
- Location: Prague, Czech Republic
- Date: 21 November
- Competitors: 22 from 18 nations

Medalists
gold medal	Tamerlan Bashaev (1st title)	Russia
silver medal	Inal Tasoev	Russia
bronze medal	Guram Tushishvili	Georgia
bronze medal	Levani Matiashvili	Georgia

Competition at external databases
- Links: IJF • JudoInside

The men's +100 kg competition at the 2020 European Judo Championships was held on 21 November at the O2 Arena.

== Results ==
=== Final ===
Final
Tamerlan Bashaev (RUS)	01
Inal Tasoev (RUS)	00

=== Repechage ===
Repechage
Lukáš Krpálek (CZE)	10
Or Sasson (ISR)	00

Third place
Lukáš Krpálek (CZE)	00
Guram Tushishvili (GEO)	10

Repechage
Stephan Hegyi (AUT)	10
Jur Spijkers (NED)	00

Third place
Stephan Hegyi (AUT)	00
Levani Matiashvili (GEO)	10

=== Top half ===
Round of 32
Cemal Erdoğan (TUR)	00
Johannes Frey (GER)	10
Tamerlan Bashaev (RUS)	11
Richárd Sipőcz (HUN)	00
Maciej Sarnacki (POL)	10
Daniel Allerstorfer (AUT)	00

Round of 16
Lukáš Krpálek (CZE)	10
Johannes Frey (GER)	00
Ushangi Kokauri (AZE)	01
Tamerlan Bashaev (RUS)	11
Roy Meyer (NED)	00
Levani Matiashvili (GEO)	10
Or Sasson (ISR)	10
Maciej Sarnacki (POL)	00

Quarterfinals
Lukáš Krpálek (CZE)	00
Tamerlan Bashaev (RUS)	10
Levani Matiashvili (GEO)	10
Or Sasson (ISR)	00

Semifinals
Tamerlan Bashaev (RUS)	11
Levani Matiashvili (GEO)	00

=== Bottom half ===
Round of 32
Enej Marinič (SLO)	00
Martti Puumalainen (FIN)	11
Ivan Čović (CRO)	00
Yahor Kukharenka (BLR)	10
Márius Fízeľ (SVK)	00
Jur Spijkers (NED)	10

Round of 16
Inal Tasoev (RUS)	10
Martti Puumalainen (FIN)	00
Stephan Hegyi (AUT)	01
Yahor Kukharenka (BLR)	00
Guram Tushishvili (GEO)	10
Luca Kunszabo (ROU)	00
Yakiv Khammo (UKR)	01
Jur Spijkers (NED)	10

Quarterfinals
Inal Tasoev (RUS)	10
Stephan Hegyi (AUT)	00
Guram Tushishvili (GEO)	10
Jur Spijkers (NED)	01

Semifinals
Inal Tasoev (RUS)	10
Guram Tushishvili (GEO)	00
