= 2019 World Judo Championships – Men's +100 kg =

Judo competition

Judo Men's +100 kg at the 2019 World Judo Championships
- Venue: Nippon Budokan
- Location: Tokyo, Japan
- Date: 31 August
- Competitors: 41 from 34 nations
- Total prize money: 57,000$

Medalists
gold medal	Lukáš Krpálek (1st title)	Czech Republic
silver medal	Hisayoshi Harasawa	Japan
bronze medal	Kim Min-jong	South Korea
bronze medal	Roy Meyer	Netherlands

Competition at external databases
- Links: IJF • JudoInside

The Men's +100 kg competition at the 2019 World Judo Championships was held on 31 August 2019.

== Results ==
=== Finals ===
Semi-finals
(Georgia (country)) Guram Tushishvili	00
(Japan) Hisayoshi Harasawa	10
(Czech Republic) Lukáš Krpálek	10
(South Korea) Kim Min-jong	00

Final
(Japan) Hisayoshi Harasawa	00
(Czech Republic) Lukáš Krpálek	10

=== Repechage ===
Repechage
(Netherlands) Henk Grol	00
(Brazil) Rafael Silva	10

Third place
(Brazil) Rafael Silva	00
(South Korea) Kim Min-jong	10

Repechage
(Netherlands) Roy Meyer	10
(Brazil) David Moura	00

Third place
(Netherlands) Roy Meyer	01
(Georgia (country)) Guram Tushishvili	00

=== Pool A ===
First round
(Philippines) Shin Matsumura	00
(Belarus) Aliaksandr Vakhaviak	11
(Netherlands) Henk Grol	10
(Kyrgyzstan) Iurii Krakovetskii	00

Second round
(Georgia (country)) Guram Tushishvili	10
(India) Shubham Kumar	00
(Tajikistan) Temur Rakhimov	10
(Belarus) Aliaksandr Vakhaviak	00
(Chile) Francisco Solis	00
(Netherlands) Henk Grol	11

Third round
(Georgia (country)) Guram Tushishvili	10
(Tajikistan) Temur Rakhimov	00
(Ecuador) Freddy Figueroa	00
(Netherlands) Henk Grol	10

Quarterfinals
(Georgia (country)) Guram Tushishvili	11
(Netherlands) Henk Grol	00

=== Pool B ===
First round
(Azerbaijan) Ushangi Kokauri	00
(Austria) Stephan Hegyi	10
(Samoa) Derek Sua	00
(Cuba) Andy Granda	10

Second round
(Japan) Hisayoshi Harasawa	10
(Austria) Stephan Hegyi	00
(Mongolia) Naidangiin Tüvshinbayar	10
(Senegal) Mbagnick Ndiaye	00
(Brazil) Rafael Silva	01
(Bosnia and Herzegovina) Harun Sadiković	00
(Romania) Vlăduț Simionescu	10
(Cuba) Andy Granda	00

Third round
(Japan) Hisayoshi Harasawa	10
(Mongolia) Naidangiin Tüvshinbayar	00
(Brazil) Rafael Silva	10
(Romania) Vlăduț Simionescu	00

Quarterfinals
(Japan) Hisayoshi Harasawa	10
(Brazil) Rafael Silva	00

=== Pool C ===
First round
(United States) Ajax Tadehara	00
(Serbia) Žarko Ćulum	10
(Belarus) Uladzislau Tsiarpitski	00
(Tajikistan) Shakarmamad Mirmamadov	10
(Egypt) Ahmed Wahid	00
(Russia) Inal Tasoev	10

Second round
(Czech Republic) Lukáš Krpálek	10
(Serbia) Žarko Ćulum	00
(Tajikistan) Shakarmamad Mirmamadov	10
(Uzbekistan) Bekmurod Oltiboev	00
(Netherlands) Roy Meyer	10
(Russia) Inal Tasoev	00
(Mongolia) Ölziibayaryn Düürenbayar	10
(Australia) Liam Park	00

Third round
(Czech Republic) Lukáš Krpálek	10
(Tajikistan) Shakarmamad Mirmamadov	00
(Netherlands) Roy Meyer	10
(Mongolia) Ölziibayaryn Düürenbayar	00

Quarterfinals
(Czech Republic) Lukáš Krpálek	10
(Netherlands) Roy Meyer	00

=== Pool D ===
First round
(Myanmar) Zaw Myo Oo	00
(Saudi Arabia) Rakan Zaidan	11
(South Korea) Kim Min-jong	01
(Kyrgyzstan) Bekbolot Toktogonov	00

Second round
(Brazil) David Moura	10
(Saudi Arabia) Rakan Zaidan	00
(Slovenia) Vito Dragič	10
(Burkina Faso) Rachid Sidibé	00
(Israel) Or Sasson	00
(South Korea) Kim Min-jong	01
(China) Yuan Shaotong	00
(Germany) Johannes Frey	01

Third round
(Brazil) David Moura	10
(Slovenia) Vito Dragič	00
(South Korea) Kim Min-jong	10
(Germany) Johannes Frey	00

Quarterfinals
(Brazil) David Moura	01
(South Korea) Kim Min-jong	10

== Prize money ==
The sums listed bring the total prizes awarded to 57,000$ for the individual event.

Medal	Total	Judoka	Coach
Gold	26,000$	20,800$	5,200$
Silver	15,000$	12,000$	3,000$
Bronze	8,000$	6,400$	1,600$
