= Ali Omar =

Ali Omar may refer to:

- Ali Omar (footballer, born 1980), Yemeni football forward
- Ali Omar (judoka) (born 1994), Libyan judoka
- Ali Omar (footballer, born 1999), Somali football centre-back for Larne
