= 2021 World Judo Championships – Men's +100 kg =

Judo competition

Judo Men's +100 kg at the 2021 World Judo Championships
- Venue: László Papp Budapest Sports Arena
- Location: Budapest, Hungary
- Date: 12 June
- Competitors: 33 from 27 nations
- Total prize money: 57,000€

Medalists
gold medal	Kokoro Kageura (1st title)	Japan
silver medal	Tamerlan Bashaev
bronze medal	Roy Meyer	Netherlands
bronze medal	Iakiv Khammo	Ukraine

Competition at external databases
- Links: IJF • JudoInside

The Men's +100 kg competition at the 2021 World Judo Championships was held on 12 June 2021.

== Results ==
=== Finals ===
Semi-finals
Tamerlan Bashaev	10
(Georgia (country)) Gela Zaalishvili	00
(Brazil) Rafael Silva	00
(Japan) Kokoro Kageura	10

Final
Tamerlan Bashaev	00
(Japan) Kokoro Kageura	01

=== Repechage ===
Repechage
(Tajikistan) Temur Rakhimov	00
(Netherlands) Roy Meyer	01

Third place
(Netherlands) Roy Meyer	10
(Brazil) Rafael Silva	00

Repechage
(Ukraine) Iakiv Khammo	10
(Finland) Martti Puumalainen	00

Third place
(Ukraine) Iakiv Khammo	11
(Georgia (country)) Gela Zaalishvili	00

=== Pool A ===
First round

Second round
Tamerlan Bashaev	01
(Germany) Sven Heinle	00
(Hungary) Richárd Sipőcz	10
(Canada) Marc Deschenes	00
(Israel) Or Sasson	00
(Kazakhstan) Yerassyl Kazhybayev	10
(Poland) Maciej Sarnacki	00
(Tajikistan) Temur Rakhimov	10

Third round
Tamerlan Bashaev	10
(Hungary) Richárd Sipőcz	00
(Kazakhstan) Yerassyl Kazhybayev	00
(Tajikistan) Temur Rakhimov	10

Quarterfinals
Tamerlan Bashaev	01
(Tajikistan) Temur Rakhimov	00

=== Pool B ===
First round

Second round
(Georgia (country)) Gela Zaalishvili	10
(Senegal) Mbagnick Ndiaye	01
(Austria) Daniel Allerstorfer	10
(Slovenia) Enej Marinič	00
(Netherlands) Roy Meyer	10
(Montenegro) Anto Dubreta	00

Third round
(Georgia (country)) Gela Zaalishvili	10
(Austria) Daniel Allerstorfer	00
(Netherlands) Roy Meyer	11
(Uzbekistan) Bekmurod Oltiboev	00

Quarterfinals
(Georgia (country)) Gela Zaalishvili	10
(Netherlands) Roy Meyer	00

=== Pool C ===
First round
(Slovenia) Vito Dragič	00
(Uzbekistan) Alisher Yusupov	01

Second round
(Brazil) Rafael Silva	10
(Cuba) Andy Granda	00
(Uzbekistan) Alisher Yusupov	00
(South Korea) Kim Sung-min	10
(Ukraine) Iakiv Khammo	10
(Romania) Vlăduț Simionescu	00
(Mongolia) Duurenbayar Ulziibayar	00
(Austria) Stephan Hegyi	11

Third round
(Brazil) Rafael Silva	10
(South Korea) Kim Sung-min	00
(Ukraine) Iakiv Khammo	10
(Austria) Stephan Hegyi	00

Quarterfinals
(Brazil) Rafael Silva	10
(Ukraine) Iakiv Khammo	00

=== Pool D ===
First round

Second round
(Japan) Kokoro Kageura	10
(United States) Ruben Martin	00
(Netherlands) Jur Spijkers	10
(Kyrgyzstan) Iurii Krakovetskii	00
(Brazil) David Moura	01
(Turkey) Cemal Erdoğan	00
(Pakistan) Hamid Ali	00
(Finland) Martti Puumalainen	10

Third round
(Japan) Kokoro Kageura	10
(Netherlands) Jur Spijkers	00
(Brazil) David Moura	00
(Finland) Martti Puumalainen	10

Quarterfinals
(Japan) Kokoro Kageura	11
(Finland) Martti Puumalainen	00

== Prize money ==
The sums listed bring the total prizes awarded to 57,000€ for the individual event.

Medal	Total	Judoka	Coach
Gold	26,000€	20,800€	5,200€
Silver	15,000€	12,000€	3,000€
Bronze	8,000€	6,400€	1,600€
