= 2018 European Judo Championships – Men's +100 kg =

Judo competition

Judo Men's +100 kg at the 2018 European Judo Championships
- Venue: Expo Tel Aviv
- Location: Tel Aviv, Israel
- Date: 28 April

Medalists
gold medal	Lukáš Krpálek (1st title)	Czech Republic
silver medal	Tamerlan Bashaev	Russia
bronze medal	Stephan Hegyi	Austria
bronze medal	Henk Grol	Netherlands

Competition at external databases
- Links: IJF • JudoInside

The men's +100 kg competition at the 2018 European Judo Championships was held on 28 April at the Expo Tel Aviv.

== Results ==
=== Finals ===
Semi-finals
Guram Tushishvili (GEO)	00
Tamerlan Bashaev (RUS)	01
Lukáš Krpálek (CZE)	10
Stephan Hegyi (AUT)	00

Final
Tamerlan Bashaev (RUS)	00
Lukáš Krpálek (CZE)	11

=== Repechage ===
Repechage
Oleksandr Gordiienko (UKR)	00
Roy Meyer (NED)	10

Third place
Roy Meyer (NED)	00
Stephan Hegyi (AUT)	10

Repechage
Henk Grol (NED)	10
Maciej Sarnacki (POL)	01

Third place
Henk Grol (NED)	10
Guram Tushishvili (GEO)	00

=== Pool A ===
First round
Harun Sadiković (BIH)	10
Benjamin Harmegnies (BEL)	00

Round of 16
Guram Tushishvili (GEO)	10
Thormodur Jonsson (ISL)	01
Oleksandr Gordiienko (UKR)	10
Harun Sadiković (BIH)	00

Quarterfinals
Guram Tushishvili (GEO)	01
Oleksandr Gordiienko (UKR)	00

=== Pool B ===
First round
Ushangi Kokauri (AZE)	00
Tamerlan Bashaev (RUS)	01

Round of 16
Roy Meyer (NED)	10
Ignas Mečajus (LTU)	00
Or Sasson (ISR)	00
Tamerlan Bashaev (RUS)	01

Quarterfinals
Roy Meyer (NED)	00
Tamerlan Bashaev (RUS)	01

=== Pool C ===
First round
Henk Grol (NED)	11
Vlăduț Simionescu (ROU)	01

Round of 16
Lukáš Krpálek (CZE)	10
Dimitrios Tsoumitas (GRE)	00
Aliaksandr Vakhaviak (BLR)	00
Henk Grol (NED)	10

Quarterfinals
Lukáš Krpálek (CZE)	10
Henk Grol (NED)	00

=== Pool D ===
First round
Žarko Ćulum (SRB)	11
Hamza Ouchani (FRA)	00

Round of 16
Maciej Sarnacki (POL)	10
Vito Dragič (SLO)	00
Stephan Hegyi (AUT)	10
Žarko Ćulum (SRB)	00

Quarterfinals
Maciej Sarnacki (POL)	00
Stephan Hegyi (AUT)	01
