= Judo at the 2020 Summer Olympics – Men's +100 kg =

Judo competition

Men's +100 kg at the Games of the XXXII Olympiad
- Venue: Nippon Budokan
- Date: 30 July 2021
- Competitors: 22 from 22 nations

Medalists
| 1st place, gold medalist(s) | | Lukáš Krpálek | Czech Republic |
| 2nd place, silver medalist(s) | | Guram Tushishvili | Georgia |
| 3rd place, bronze medalist(s) | | Teddy Riner | France |
| 3rd place, bronze medalist(s) | | Tamerlan Bashaev | ROC |

The men's +100 kg competition in judo at the 2020 Summer Olympics in Tokyo was held on 30 July 2021 at the Nippon Budokan.

== Results ==
=== Finals ===
Semi-finals
1 Tamerlan Bashaev (ROC) | 01
4 Guram Tushishvili (GEO) | 11
2 Hisayoshi Harasawa (JPN) | 00
3 Lukáš Krpálek (CZE) | 01

Gold medal
4 Guram Tushishvili (GEO) | 00
3 Lukáš Krpálek (CZE) | 10

=== Repechage ===
Repechage
Teddy Riner (FRA) | 11
5 Rafael Silva (BRA) | 00

Bronze medal
2 Hisayoshi Harasawa (JPN) | 00
Teddy Riner (FRA) | 10

Repechage
7 Iakiv Khammo (UKR) | 01
Bekmurod Oltiboev (UZB) | 00

Bronze medal
1 Tamerlan Bashaev (ROC) | 10
7 Iakiv Khammo (UKR) | 00

=== Pool A ===
Round of 32
Teddy Riner (FRA) | 10
Stephan Hegyi (AUT) | 00

Round of 16
1 Tamerlan Bashaev (ROC) | 10
Mbagnick Ndiaye (SEN) | 00
8 Or Sasson (ISR) | 00
Teddy Riner (FRA) | 01

Quarter-finals
1 Tamerlan Bashaev (ROC) | 01
Teddy Riner (FRA) | 00

=== Pool B ===
Round of 32
Temur Rakhimov (TJK) | 01
Andy Granda (CUB) | 00
Maciej Sarnacki (POL) | 00
Ushangi Kokauri (AZE) | 10

Round of 16
4 Guram Tushishvili (GEO) | 10
Temur Rakhimov (TJK) | 00
5 Rafael Silva (BRA) | 10
Ushangi Kokauri (AZE) | 00

Quarter-finals
4 Guram Tushishvili (GEO) | 10
5 Rafael Silva (BRA) | 00

=== Pool C ===
Round of 32
Ali Omar (LBA) | 00
Vlăduț Simionescu (ROU) | 10

Round of 16
2 Hisayoshi Harasawa (JPN) | 01
Kim Min-jong (KOR) | 00
7 Iakiv Khammo (UKR) | 01
Vlăduț Simionescu (ROU) | 00

Quarter-finals
2 Hisayoshi Harasawa (JPN) | 10
7 Iakiv Khammo (UKR) | 00

=== Pool D ===
Round of 32
Javad Mahjoub (EOR) | 01
Johannes Frey (GER) | 00
Ölziibayaryn Düürenbayar (MGL) | 00
Bekmurod Oltiboev (UZB) | 10

Round of 16
3 Lukáš Krpálek (CZE) | 11
Javad Mahjoub (EOR) | 00
6 Henk Grol (NED) | 00
Bekmurod Oltiboev (UZB) | 10

Quarter-finals
3 Lukáš Krpálek (CZE) | 01
Bekmurod Oltiboev (UZB) | 00

== Weigh-in List ==
Weights in table are listed in Kg.

| Result | Judoka | Weight |
|---|---|---|
| 1st place, gold medalist(s) | Lukáš Krpálek (CZE) | 111.3 |
| 2nd place, silver medalist(s) | Guram Tushishvili (GEO) | 118.4 |
| 3rd place, bronze medalist(s) | Teddy Riner (FRA) | 139.2 |
| 3rd place, bronze medalist(s) | Tamerlan Bashaev (ROC) | 128.3 |
| 5 | Hisayoshi Harasawa (JPN) | 123.1 |
| 5 | Iakiv Khammo (UKR) | 138.3 |
| 7 | Rafael Silva (BRA) | 180.5 |
| 7 | Bekmurod Oltiboev (UZB) | 124.3 |
| 9 | Mbagnick Ndiaye (SEN) | 133.9 |
| 9 | Or Sasson (ISR) | 124.6 |
| 9 | Temur Rakhimov (TJK) | 121.3 |
| 9 | Ushangi Kokauri (AZE) | 143.8 |
| 9 | Kim Min-jong (KOR) | 136.3 |
| 9 | Vlăduț Simionescu (ROU) | 164.2 |
| 9 | Javad Mahjoub (EOR) | 120.4 |
| 9 | Henk Grol (NED) | 111.6 |
| 17 | Stephan Hegyi (AUT) | 130.8 |
| 17 | Andy Granda (CUB) | 111.8 |
| 17 | Maciej Sarnacki (POL) | 134.5 |
| 17 | Ali Omar (LBA) | 153.7 |
| 17 | Johannes Frey (GER) | 115.8 |
| 17 | Ölziibayaryn Düürenbayar (MGL) | 137.2 |
