= 2017 European Judo Championships – Men's +100 kg =

Judo competition

Judo Men's +100 kg at the 2017 European Judo Championships
- Venue: Torwar Hall
- Location: Warsaw, Poland
- Date: April 22, 2017
- Competitors: 23 from 19 nations

Medalists
gold medal	Guram Tushishvili (1st title)	Georgia
silver medal	Adam Okruashvili	Georgia
bronze medal	Roy Meyer	Netherlands
bronze medal	Lukáš Krpálek	Czech Republic

Competition at external databases
- Links: IJF • JudoInside

The men's +100 kg competition at the 2017 European Judo Championships in Warsaw was held on 22 April at the Torwar Hall.

== Results ==
=== Finals ===
Semi-finals
Maciej Sarnacki (POL)	000
Adam Okruashvili (GEO)	020
Guram Tushishvili (GEO)	110
Roy Meyer (NED)	000

Final
Adam Okruashvili (GEO)	000
Guram Tushishvili (GEO)	110

=== Repechages ===
Repechage		Bronze medal
Harun Sadikovic (BIH)	100
Iakiv Khammo (UKR)	000	Harun Sadikovic (BIH)	000
		Roy Meyer (NED)	100

Repechage		Bronze medal
Lukáš Krpálek (CZE)	100
Stanislav Bondarenko (UKR)	000	Lukáš Krpálek (CZE)	100
		Maciej Sarnacki (POL)	000

=== Pool A ===
First round		Second round		Quarterfinals
		Barna Bor (HUN)	000
Maciej Sarnacki (POL)	100	Maciej Sarnacki (POL)	100
Daniel Allerstorfer (AUT)	000			Maciej Sarnacki (POL)	100
				Harun Sadikovic (BIH)	000
		Ushangi Kokauri (AZE)	000
		Harun Sadikovic (BIH)	100

=== Pool B ===
First round
Uladzislau Tsiarpitski (BLR)	000
Feyyaz Yazıcı (TUR)	020
Marius Paškevičius (LTU)	100
Benjamin Harmegnies (BEL)	000

Second round
Iakiv Khammo (UKR)	020
Feyyaz Yazıcı (TUR)	000
Adam Okruashvili (GEO)	100
Marius Paškevičius (LTU)	000

Quarterfinals
Iakiv Khammo (UKR)	000
Adam Okruashvili (GEO)	100

=== Pool C ===
First round
Lukáš Krpálek (CZE)	100
Juhan Mettis (EST)	000
Kamil Grabowski (POL)	110
Semih Adiyaman (TUR)	000

Second round
Daniel Natea (ROU)	010
Lukáš Krpálek (CZE)	110
Guram Tushishvili (GEO)	110
Kamil Grabowski (POL)	000

Quarterfinals
Lukáš Krpálek (CZE)	000
Guram Tushishvili (GEO)	100

=== Pool D ===
First round
Yahor Kukharenka (BLR)	010
Sven Heinle (GER)	000
Stephan Hegyi (AUT)	010
Žarko Ćulum (SRB)	000

Second round
Stanislav Bondarenko (UKR)	110
Yahor Kukharenka (BLR)	000
Roy Meyer (NED)	010
Stephan Hegyi (AUT)	000

Quarterfinals
Stanislav Bondarenko (UKR)	000
Roy Meyer (NED)	100
