= Tahani Alqahtani =

Saudi Arabian judoka (born 1999)

Personal information
- Born: 3 August 1999 (age 26) Riyadh, Saudi Arabia
- Occupation: Judoka

Sport
- Country: Saudi Arabia
- Sport: Judo
- Weight class: +78 kg

Achievements and titles
- Olympic Games: R32 (2020)
- World Champ.: R32 (2021)
- Asian Champ.: R32 (2024)

Profile at external databases
- IJF: 63832
- JudoInside.com: 109232
- Updated on 24 May 2024

Tahani Alqahtani (Arabic: تهاني القحطاني; born 3 August 1999) is a Saudi Arabian international level judoka.

Alqahtani qualified for the 2020 Summer Olympics. She participated at the 2021 World Judo Championships. She was eliminated from 2020 Olympics after losing to Israeli counterpart Raz Hershko. The match gained notability for Tahani agreeing to compete against an Israeli athlete, which was never done before in the history of Saudi Arabia's Olympics participation despite boycott pressure.
