= 2014 Judo Grand Prix Qingdao =

Judo competition

Judo 2014 Judo Grand Prix Qingdao
- Venue: Guoxin Gymnasium
- Location: Qingdao, China
- Dates: 19–21 November 2014
- Competitors: 215 from 32 nations

Competition at external databases
- Links: IJF • EJU • JudoInside

The 2014 Judo Grand Prix Qingdao was held at the Guoxin Gymnasium in Qingdao, China from 19 to 21 November 2014.

== Medal summary ==
=== Men's events ===
Event	Gold	Silver	Bronze
Extra-lightweight (−60 kg)	Vincent Limare (FRA)	Hovhannes Davtyan (ARM)	Ludwig Paischer (AUT)
Extra-lightweight (−60 kg)	Vincent Limare (FRA)	Hovhannes Davtyan (ARM)	Robert Mshvidobadze (RUS)
Half-lightweight (−66 kg)	Yakub Shamilov (RUS)	Sebastian Seidl (GER)	Yuhei Rokugo (JPN)
Half-lightweight (−66 kg)	Yakub Shamilov (RUS)	Sebastian Seidl (GER)	Ma Duanbin (CHN)
Lightweight (−73 kg)	Hong Kuk-hyon (PRK)	Dirk Van Tichelt (BEL)	Miklós Ungvári (HUN)
Lightweight (−73 kg)	Hong Kuk-hyon (PRK)	Dirk Van Tichelt (BEL)	Sun Shuai (CHN)
Half-middleweight (−81 kg)	Sirazhudin Magomedov (RUS)	Antonio Ciano (ITA)	Otgonbaataryn Uuganbaatar (MGL)
Half-middleweight (−81 kg)	Sirazhudin Magomedov (RUS)	Antonio Ciano (ITA)	Robin Pacek (SWE)
Middleweight (−90 kg)	Noël van 't End (NED)	Alon Sasson (ISR)	Gantulgyn Altanbagana (MGL)
Middleweight (−90 kg)	Noël van 't End (NED)	Alon Sasson (ISR)	Joakim Dvärby (SWE)
Half-heavyweight (−100 kg)	Martin Pacek (SWE)	Karl-Richard Frey (GER)	Dimitri Peters (GER)
Half-heavyweight (−100 kg)	Martin Pacek (SWE)	Karl-Richard Frey (GER)	Ryosuke Takahashi (JPN)
Heavyweight (+100 kg)	Hisayoshi Harasawa (JPN)	Ölziibayaryn Düürenbayar (MGL)	Roy Meyer (NED)
Heavyweight (+100 kg)	Hisayoshi Harasawa (JPN)	Ölziibayaryn Düürenbayar (MGL)	Kenta Nishigata (JPN)

=== Women's events ===
Event	Gold	Silver	Bronze
Extra-lightweight (−48 kg)	Monica Ungureanu (ROU)	Paula Pareto (ARG)	Otgontsetseg Galbadrakh (MGL)
Extra-lightweight (−48 kg)	Monica Ungureanu (ROU)	Paula Pareto (ARG)	Kim Sol-mi (PRK)
Half-lightweight (−52 kg)	Natalia Kuziutina (RUS)	Yuka Nishida (JPN)	Mareen Kräh (GER)
Half-lightweight (−52 kg)	Natalia Kuziutina (RUS)	Yuka Nishida (JPN)	Christianne Legentil (MRI)
Lightweight (−57 kg)	Miryam Roper (GER)	Liu Yang (CHN)	Jovana Rogić (SRB)
Lightweight (−57 kg)	Miryam Roper (GER)	Liu Yang (CHN)	Sanne Verhagen (NED)
Half-middleweight (−63 kg)	Yarden Gerbi (ISR)	Kathrin Unterwurzacher (AUT)	Anicka van Emden (NED)
Half-middleweight (−63 kg)	Yarden Gerbi (ISR)	Kathrin Unterwurzacher (AUT)	Megumi Horikawa (JPN)
Middleweight (−70 kg)	Iljana Marzok (GER)	Assmaa Niang (MAR)	Bernadette Graf (AUT)
Middleweight (−70 kg)	Iljana Marzok (GER)	Assmaa Niang (MAR)	Zhou Chao (CHN)
Half-heavyweight (−78 kg)	Sol Kyong (PRK)	Guusje Steenhuis (NED)	Mami Umeki (JPN)
Half-heavyweight (−78 kg)	Sol Kyong (PRK)	Guusje Steenhuis (NED)	Kerstin Thiele (GER)
Heavyweight (+78 kg)	Yu Song (CHN)	Wang Rui (CHN)	Qin Qian (CHN)
Heavyweight (+78 kg)	Yu Song (CHN)	Wang Rui (CHN)	Nami Inamori (JPN)

Source Results

=== Medal table ===
* Host nation (China)

Rank	Nation	Gold	Silver	Bronze	Total
1	Russia (RUS)	3	0	1	4
2	Germany (GER)	2	2	3	7
3	North Korea (PRK)	2	0	1	3
4	China (CHN)*	1	2	4	7
5	Japan (JPN)	1	1	6	8
6	Netherlands (NED)	1	1	3	5
7	Israel (ISR)	1	1	0	2
8	Sweden (SWE)	1	0	2	3
9	France (FRA)	1	0	0	1
9	Romania (ROU)	1	0	0	1
11	Mongolia (MGL)	0	1	3	4
12	Austria (AUT)	0	1	2	3
13	Argentina (ARG)	0	1	0	1
13	Armenia (ARM)	0	1	0	1
13	Belgium (BEL)	0	1	0	1
13	Italy (ITA)	0	1	0	1
13	Morocco (MAR)	0	1	0	1
18	Hungary (HUN)	0	0	1	1
18	Mauritius (MRI)	0	0	1	1
18	Serbia (SRB)	0	0	1	1
Totals (20 entries)		14	14	28	56
