= Tamerlan Bashaev =

Russian judoka (born 1996)

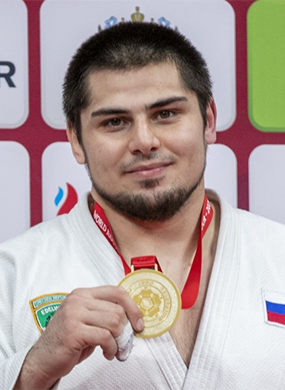
- Bashaev in 2021

Personal information
- Full name: Tamerlan Tausovich Bashaev
- Nationality: Russian
- Born: 22 April 1996 (age 30) Moscow
- Occupation: Judoka
- Military career
- Allegiance: Russia
- Branch: Russian Armed Forces
- Rank: Senior sergeant

Sport
- Country: Russia
- Sport: Judo
- Weight class: +100 kg

Achievements and titles
- Olympic Games: (bronze) (2020)
- World Champ.: (silver) (2021)
- European Champ.: (gold) (2020)
Medal record
Men's judo
Representing ROC
Olympic Games
Bronze medal – third place	2020 Tokyo	+100 kg
Representing Russia
World Championships
Silver medal – second place	2026 Baku	Mixed team
European Championships
Gold medal – first place	2020 Prague	+100 kg
Silver medal – second place	2018 Tel Aviv	+100 kg
Bronze medal – third place	2018 Yekaterinburg	Mixed team
World Masters
Bronze medal – third place	2018 Guangzhou	+100 kg
IJF Grand Slam
Gold medal – first place	2019 Ekaterinburg	+100 kg
Gold medal – first place	2021 Antalya	+100 kg
Gold medal – first place	2021 Kazan	+100 kg
Silver medal – second place	2020 Budapest	+100 kg
Silver medal – second place	2021 Tel Aviv	+100 kg
Silver medal – second place	2025 Abu Dhabi	+100 kg
Bronze medal – third place	2018 Ekaterinburg	+100 kg
Bronze medal – third place	2018 Osaka	+100 kg
IJF Grand Prix
Gold medal – first place	2026 Qingdao	+100 kg
Bronze medal – third place	2018 Tunis	+100 kg
Bronze medal – third place	2018 Cancún	+100 kg
European U23 Championships
Gold medal – first place	2017 Podgorica	+100 kg
Silver medal – second place	2016 Tel Aviv	+100 kg
World Juniors Championships
Gold medal – first place	2015 Abu Dhabi	+100 kg
European Junior Championships
Bronze medal – third place	2014 Bucharest	+100 kg
Bronze medal – third place	2016 Málaga	+100 kg
European Cadet Championships
Silver medal – second place	2013 Tallinn	+90 kg
Representing the (Russia) Russian Judo Federation
World Championships
Silver medal – second place	2021 Budapest	+100 kg
Representing Individual Neutral Athletes
World Championships
Bronze medal – third place	2024 Abu Dhabi	+100 kg
European Championships
Bronze medal – third place	2024 Zagreb	+100 kg
IJF Grand Slam
Gold medal – first place	2023 Astana	+100 kg
Gold medal – first place	2023 Tokyo	+100 kg
Silver medal – second place	2024 Tashkent	+100 kg
Bronze medal – third place	2023 Baku	+100 kg
Bronze medal – third place	2023 Abu Dhabi	+100 kg
IJF Grand Prix
Gold medal – first place	2023 Dushanbe	+100 kg
Bronze medal – third place	2024 Odivelas	+100 kg
Representing the IJF
European Championships
Bronze medal – third place	2025 Podgorica	Mixed team
IJF Grand Slam
Silver medal – second place	2025 Baku	+100 kg

Profile at external databases
- IJF: 13561
- JudoInside.com: 64330
- Updated on 28 June 2026

Tamerlan Tausovich Bashaev (Russian: Тамерлан Таусович Башаев, IPA: [təmʲɪrˈɫan bɐˈʂa(ɪ̯)ɪf]; born 22 April 1996) is a Russian judoka. In 2021, he won one of the bronze medals in the men's +100 kg event at the 2020 Summer Olympics held in Tokyo, Japan.

In 2020, he won the gold medal in the men's +100 kg event at the European Judo Championships held in Prague, Czech Republic. He also won the silver medal in his event at the 2021 World Judo Championships held in Budapest, Hungary.

He won the gold medal in the men's +100 kg event at the 2017 European U23 Judo Championships held in Podgorica, Montenegro. In 2018, he won the silver medal in the men's +100 kg event at the 2018 European Judo Championships held in Tel Aviv, Israel.

In 2021, he lost his bronze medal match against Henk Grol of the Netherlands, in the men's +100 kg event at the Judo World Masters held in Doha, Qatar.

Bashaev is a senior sergeant of the Russian Armed Forces and the member of the army sports club CSKA Moscow.
