= Petr Lacina =

Czech judo and coach

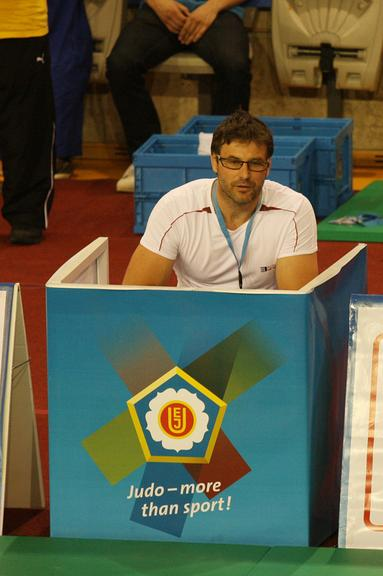
Petr Lacina

Petr Lacina (born 27 July 1973) is a Czech judoka. He competed in the men's middleweight event at the 1996 Summer Olympics. He is currently a coach of the Czech olympic champion Lukáš Krpálek.

== Achievements ==
Year	Tournament	Place	Weight class
1997	European Judo Championships	7th	Middleweight (86 kg)
