= Ölziibayaryn Düürenbayar =

Mongolian judoka (born 1994)

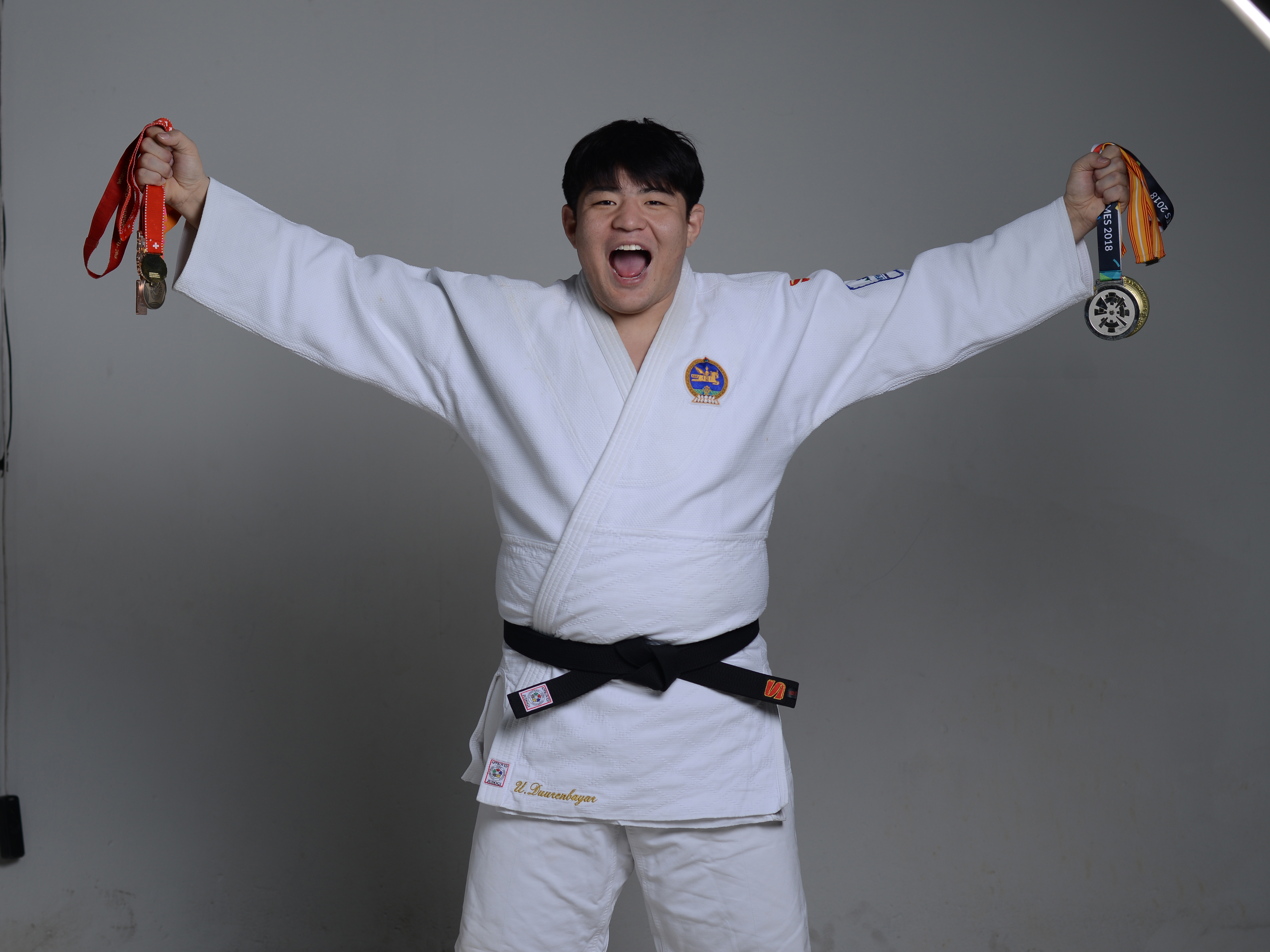
- Düürenbayar in 2021

Personal information
- Born: 31 January 1994 (age 32) Ulaanbaatar
- Occupation: Judoka
- Height: 184 cm (6 ft 0 in)
- Weight: 135 kg (298 lb)

Sport
- Country: Mongolia
- Sport: Judo
- Weight class: +100 kg
- Club: Mongolian military

Achievements and titles
- Olympic Games: R32 (2020)
- World Champ.: (bronze) (2018)
- Asian Champ.: (silver) (2014, 2018)
- Highest world ranking: 2 (2017)
Medal record
Men's judo
Representing Mongolia
World Championships
Bronze medal – third place	2018 Baku	+100 kg
Asian Games
Silver medal – second place	2014 Incheon	+100 kg
Silver medal – second place	2018 Jakarta	+100 kg
Asian Championships
Bronze medal – third place	2017 Hong Kong	+100 kg
IJF Grand Slam
Bronze medal – third place	2017 Paris	+100 kg
Bronze medal – third place	2019 Düsseldorf	+100 kg
IJF Grand Prix
Silver medal – second place	2014 Qingdao	+100 kg
Silver medal – second place	2016 Ulaanbaatar	+100 kg
Silver medal – second place	2017 Hohhot	+100 kg
Silver medal – second place	2018 Hohhot	+100 kg
Bronze medal – third place	2013 Ulaanbaatar	+100 kg
Bronze medal – third place	2015 Ulaanbaatar	+100 kg
Bronze medal – third place	2016 Qingdao	+100 kg
U21 World Championships
Gold medal – first place	2014 Fort Lauderdale	+100 kg
Silver medal – second place	2013 Ljubljana	+100 kg
Asian Junior Championships
Gold medal – first place	2010 Bangkok	+100 kg
Gold medal – first place	2012 Taipei	+100 kg
Gold medal – first place	2013 Hainan	+100 kg
Bronze medal – third place	2014 Hong Kong	+100 kg
World Military Championship
Gold medal – first place	2016 Switzerland	+100 kg

Profile at external databases
- IJF: 3771
- JudoInside.com: 58480
- Updated on 23 May 2023

Ölziibayaryn Düürenbayar (Mongolian: Өлзийбаярын Дүүрэнбаяр; born 31 January 1994) is a Mongolian judoka.

Düürenbayar participated at the 2018 World Judo Championships, where he defeated the strongest judokas such as reigning Olympic Champion Lukáš Krpálek (waza-ari in the golden score round), 2016 Olympic silver medalist Hisayoshi Harasawa (ippon), and winning a bronze medal in the +100 kg division.

Olympic Games
Preceded by Battulgyn Temüülen	Flagbearer for Mongolia (with Onolbaataryn Khulan); Tokyo 2020	Succeeded by Incumbent
