= Ali Omar (footballer, born 1980) =

Yemeni footballer

Personal information
- Date of birth: March 10, 1980 (age 46)
- Place of birth: Kuwait
- Height: 1.78 m (5 ft 10 in)
- Position: Second striker

Senior career*
Years	Team	Apps	(Gls)
1998–2011	Al-Arabi	78	(28)

International career
2008	Yemen	1	(0)
- * Club domestic league appearances and goals

Ali Omar (born 10 March 1980) is a Yemeni former footballer.

== Career ==
Omar played for Al-Arabi in the Kuwaiti Premier League, where he participated in the AFC Champions League 2004.
