= Stephan Hegyi =

Austrian judoka (born 1998)

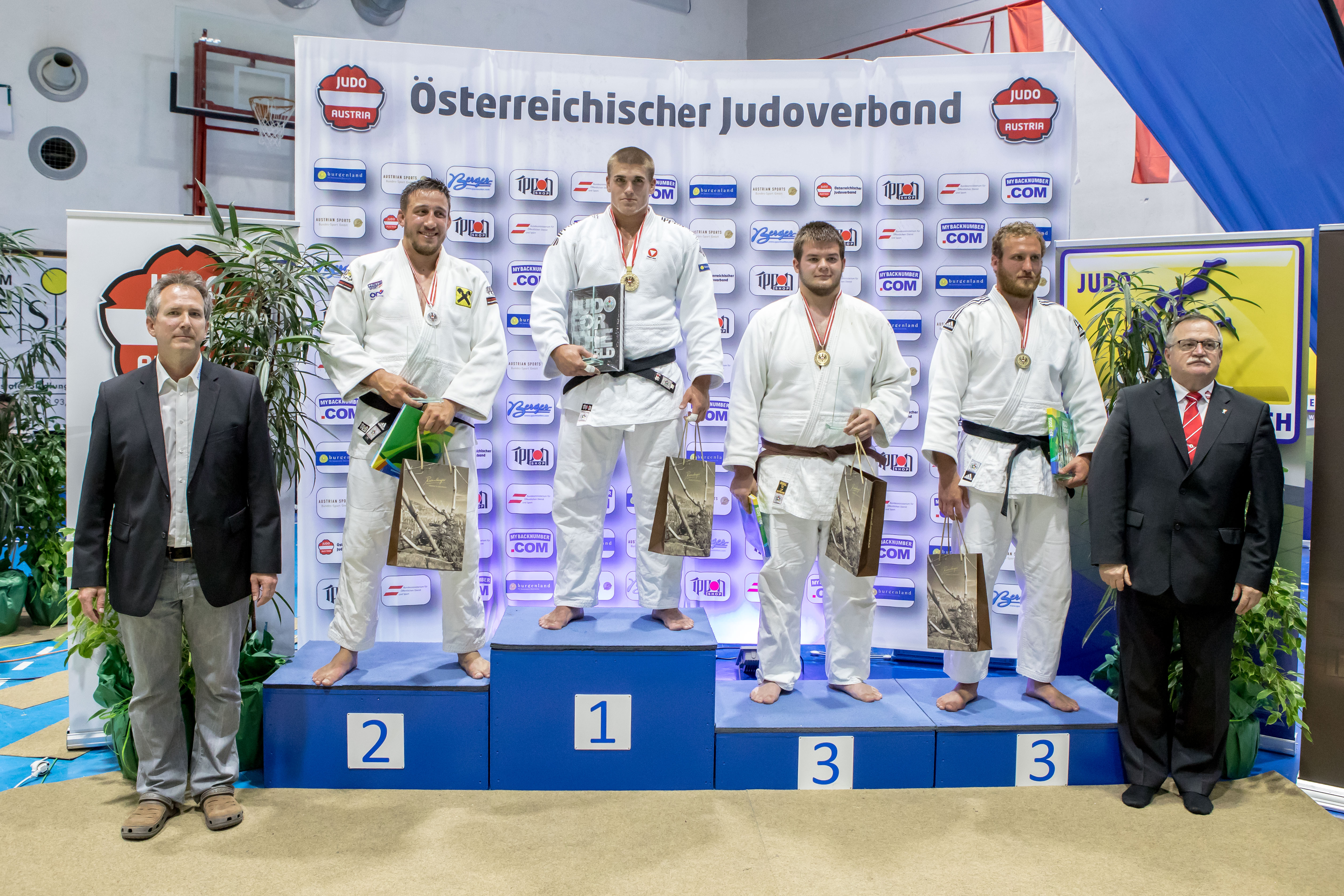
- Stephan Hegyi in 2018 (in first place)

Personal information
- Born: 25 July 1998 (age 27) Vienna, Austria
- Occupation: Judoka
- Website: stephanhegyi.com

Sport
- Country: Austria
- Sport: Judo
- Weight class: +100 kg
- Rank: 1st dan black belt
- Club: Budoclub Wien; Hakoah Vienna
- Coached by: Peter Seisenbacher

Achievements and titles
- Olympic Games: R32 (2020)
- World Champ.: R16 (2017, 2021)
- European Champ.: (bronze) (2018, 2019)
Medal record
Men's judo
Representing Austria
European Games
Bronze medal – third place	2019 Minsk	+100 kg
Bronze medal – third place	2019 Minsk	Mixed team
European Championships
Bronze medal – third place	2018 Tel Aviv	+100 kg
IJF Grand Slam
Bronze medal – third place	2019 Düsseldorf	+100 kg
Bronze medal – third place	2021 Antalya	+100 kg
Bronze medal – third place	2022 Tel Aviv	+100 kg
IJF Grand Prix
Silver medal – second place	2017 Zagreb	+100 kg
Silver medal – second place	2018 Budapest	+100 kg
Bronze medal – third place	2019 Tashkent	+100 kg
Bronze medal – third place	2025 Zagreb	+100 kg
European U23 Championships
Silver medal – second place	2018 Győr	+100 kg
World Juniors Championships
Silver medal – second place	2017 Zagreb	+100 kg
Silver medal – second place	2018 Nassau	+100 kg
European Junior Championships
Silver medal – second place	2017 Maribor	+100 kg
World Cadets Championships
Bronze medal – third place	2015 Sarajevo	+90 kg
European Cadet Championships
Bronze medal – third place	2014 Athens	+90 kg

Profile at external databases
- IJF: 20087
- JudoInside.com: 87496
- Updated on 17 November 2025

Stephan Hegyi (born 25 July 1998) is an Austrian judoka.

== Career ==
Hegyi began his career at Budoclub Wien. He followed Peter Seisenbacher to Hakoah Vienna, who was hired as a coach in 2014. He is currently the club's most successful judoka.

In 2017, he competed in the men's +100 kg and men's team events at the European Judo Championships held in Warsaw, Poland. In that same year, he also competed in the men's +100 kg event at the 2017 World Judo Championships held in Budapest, Hungary. In 2018, he won the silver medal in the men's +100 kg event at the European U23 Judo Championships held in Győr, Hungary.

In 2020, he lost his bronze medal match in the men's +100 kg event at the European Judo Championships held in Prague, Czech Republic. In 2021, he competed in the men's +100 kg event at the Judo World Masters held in Doha, Qatar. He also competed in the men's +100 kg event at the 2021 World Judo Championships in Budapest, Hungary where he was eliminated in his second match by Iakiv Khammo of Ukraine.

In 2021, Hegyi competed in the men's +100 kg event at the 2020 Summer Olympics held in Tokyo, Japan where he was eliminated in his first match by eventual bronze medalist Teddy Riner of France.

He won one of the bronze medals in his event at the 2022 Judo Grand Slam Tel Aviv held in Tel Aviv, Israel.

Stefan Hegy was unable to participate in judo competitions for a period of 20 months due to two cruciate ligament tears in his knee and a ruptured Achilles tendon.
