= Roy Meyer =

Dutch judoka (born 1991)

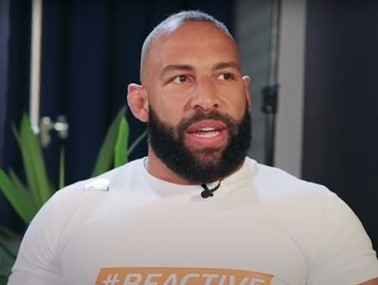
- Meye (2020)

Personal information
- Nickname: The Small Giant
- Nationality: Dutch
- Born: Roy; 4 June 1991 (age 35) Breda, Netherlands
- Home town: Rotterdam, Netherlands
- Occupation: Judoka
- Height: 186 cm (6 ft 1 in)
- Weight: 122 kg (269 lb)
- Website: roymeyer.nl

Sport
- Country: Netherlands
- Sport: Judo
- Weight class: +100 kg
- Club: Budokan Rotterdam
- Coached by: Jean-Paul Bell

Achievements and titles
- Olympic Games: 7th (2016)
- World Champ.: (bronze) (2019, 2021)
- European Champ.: (bronze) (2017, 2022)
- National finals: Dutch champion 2015
- Highest world ranking: 3(2016)
Medal record
Men's judo
Representing the Netherlands
World Championships
Bronze medal – third place	2019 Tokyo	+100 kg
Bronze medal – third place	2021 Budapest	+100 kg
Bronze medal – third place	2023 Doha	Mixed team
European Championships
Bronze medal – third place	2017 Warsaw	+100 kg
Bronze medal – third place	2022 Sofia	+100 kg
World Masters
Bronze medal – third place	2015 Rabat	+100 kg
Bronze medal – third place	2016 Guadalajara	+100 kg
IJF Grand Slam
Gold medal – first place	2019 Abu Dhabi	+100 kg
Silver medal – second place	2015 Baku	+100 kg
Silver medal – second place	2016 Baku	+100 kg
Silver medal – second place	2022 Ulaanbaatar	+100 kg
Silver medal – second place	2023 Antalya	+100 kg
Bronze medal – third place	2014 Abu Dhabi	+100 kg
Bronze medal – third place	2015 Paris	+100 kg
Bronze medal – third place	2016 Paris	+100 kg
IJF Grand Prix
Gold medal – first place	2014 Zagreb	+100 kg
Gold medal – first place	2017 The Hague	+100 kg
Gold medal – first place	2019 Antalya	+100 kg
Silver medal – second place	2013 Abu Dhabi	+100 kg
Silver medal – second place	2016 Tbilisi	+100 kg
Bronze medal – third place	2014 Qingdao	+100 kg
Bronze medal – third place	2015 Zagreb	+100 kg
Bronze medal – third place	2015 Jeju	+100 kg
Bronze medal – third place	2018 Budapest	+100 kg
Bronze medal – third place	2018 The Hague	+100 kg
Bronze medal – third place	2019 Tbilisi	+100 kg
European U23 Championships
Gold medal – first place	2012 Prague	+100 kg
World Juniors Championships
Bronze medal – third place	2010 Agadir	+100 kg
European Junior Championships
Gold medal – first place	2010 Samokov	+100 kg

Profile at external databases
- IJF: 3394
- JudoInside.com: 54809
- Updated on 23 May 2023

Roy Meyer (born 4 June 1991) is a Dutch boxer and former judoka.

He competed at the 2016 Summer Olympics in Rio de Janeiro, in the men's +100 kg. In the quarter finals he was defeated by the eventual bronze medalist Or Sasson of Israel. In the repechage he was defeated by later bronze medalist Rafael Silva of Brazil. In the second round he eliminated Deo Gracia Ngokaba of Congo and in the third round he eliminated Kim Sung-Min of South Korea.

On 22 December 2024, Meyer competed in his first boxing match against American internet personality and actor NickNack PattiWhack for the Influencer Championship Boxing (ICB) International Heavyweight Champion. Meyer officially announced his retirement from judo in July 2025. On 5 October 2025, he competed in his second boxing match against kickboxing and MMA veteran Melvin Manhoef. Meyer won the match in the second round after Manhoef had to retire due to an injury.

== Influencer boxing record ==
2 fights	2 wins	0 losses
By knockout	2	0

No.	Result	Record	Opponent	Type	Round, time	Date	Location	Notes
2	Win	2–0	Melvin Manhoef	TKO (Injury)	2, 0:13	Oct 5, 2025	The Hague, the Netherlands	Wins ICB World Heavyweight title
1	Win	1–0	Nick Joseph	TKO	2, 0:53	Dec 22, 2024	Hilversum, the Netherlands	Wins ICB International Heavyweight title
