= Hisayoshi Harasawa =

Japanese judoka (born 1992)

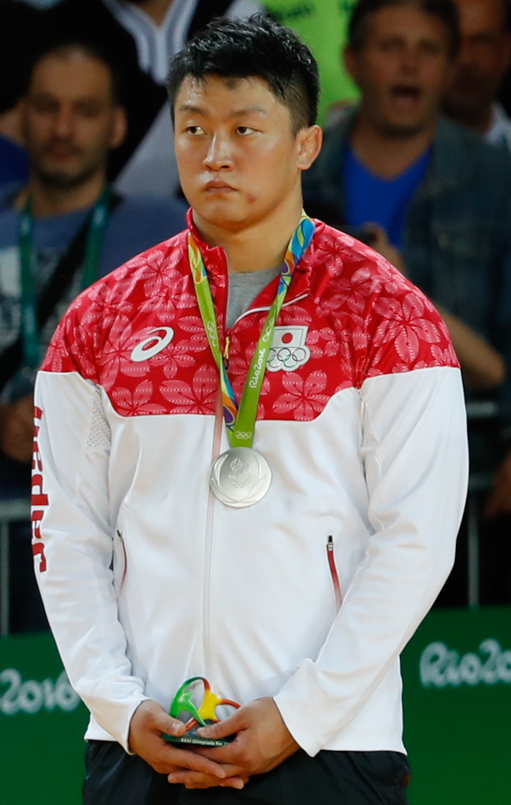
- Harasawa at the 2016 Summer Olympics

Personal information
- Nationality: Japanese
- Born: 3 July 1992 (age 33) Shimonoseki, Japan
- Occupation: Judoka
- Height: 1.91 m (6 ft 3 in)
- Weight: 125 kg (276 lb)

Sport
- Country: Japan
- Sport: Judo
- Weight class: +100 kg

Achievements and titles
- Olympic Games: (silver) (2016)
- World Champ.: (silver) (2019)
- Asian Champ.: (gold) (2021)
Medal record
Men's judo
Representing Japan
Olympic Games
Silver medal – second place	2016 Rio de Janeiro	+100 kg
Silver medal – second place	2020 Tokyo	Mixed team
World Championships
Silver medal – second place	2019 Tokyo	+100 kg
Bronze medal – third place	2018 Baku	+100 kg
Asian Championships
Gold medal – first place	2021 Bishkek	+100 kg
World Masters
Gold medal – first place	2019 Qingdao	+100 kg
Bronze medal – third place	2016 Guadalajara	+100 kg
IJF Grand Slam
Gold medal – first place	2015 Tyumen	+100 kg
Gold medal – first place	2015 Paris	+100 kg
Gold medal – first place	2015 Tokyo	+100 kg
Gold medal – first place	2016 Paris	+100 kg
Gold medal – first place	2019 Düsseldorf	+100 kg
Silver medal – second place	2018 Düsseldorf	+100 kg
Silver medal – second place	2019 Paris	+100 kg
Silver medal – second place	2021 Antalya	+100 kg
Bronze medal – third place	2013 Tokyo	+100 kg
Bronze medal – third place	2014 Tyumen	+100 kg
Bronze medal – third place	2022 Tokyo	+100 kg
IJF Grand Prix
Gold medal – first place	2014 Qingdao	+100 kg
Silver medal – second place	2017 Düsseldorf	+100 kg
Silver medal – second place	2019 Montreal	+100 kg
Silver medal – second place	2019 Zagreb	+100 kg
Summer Universiade
Gold medal – first place	2015 Gwangju	+100 kg

Profile at external databases
- IJF: 11651
- JudoInside.com: 74337
- Updated on 23 May 2023

Hisayoshi Harasawa (原沢 久喜, Harasawa Hisayoshi; born 3 July 1992) is a Japanese judoka. Harasawa was considered a staple of Japanese heavyweight judo throughout the 2010s decade.

== Career ==
He competed at the 2016 Summer Olympics in Rio de Janeiro, in the men's +100 kg. where he won the silver medal on the final against gold medal winner Teddy Riner.

After being seeded #2 for the 2020 Summer Olympics in Tokyo, Harasawa once again faced Teddy Riner, this time for the men's +100 kg bronze medal. Riner defeated Harasawa by ippon.
