= Lukáš Krpálek =

Czech judoka (born 1990)

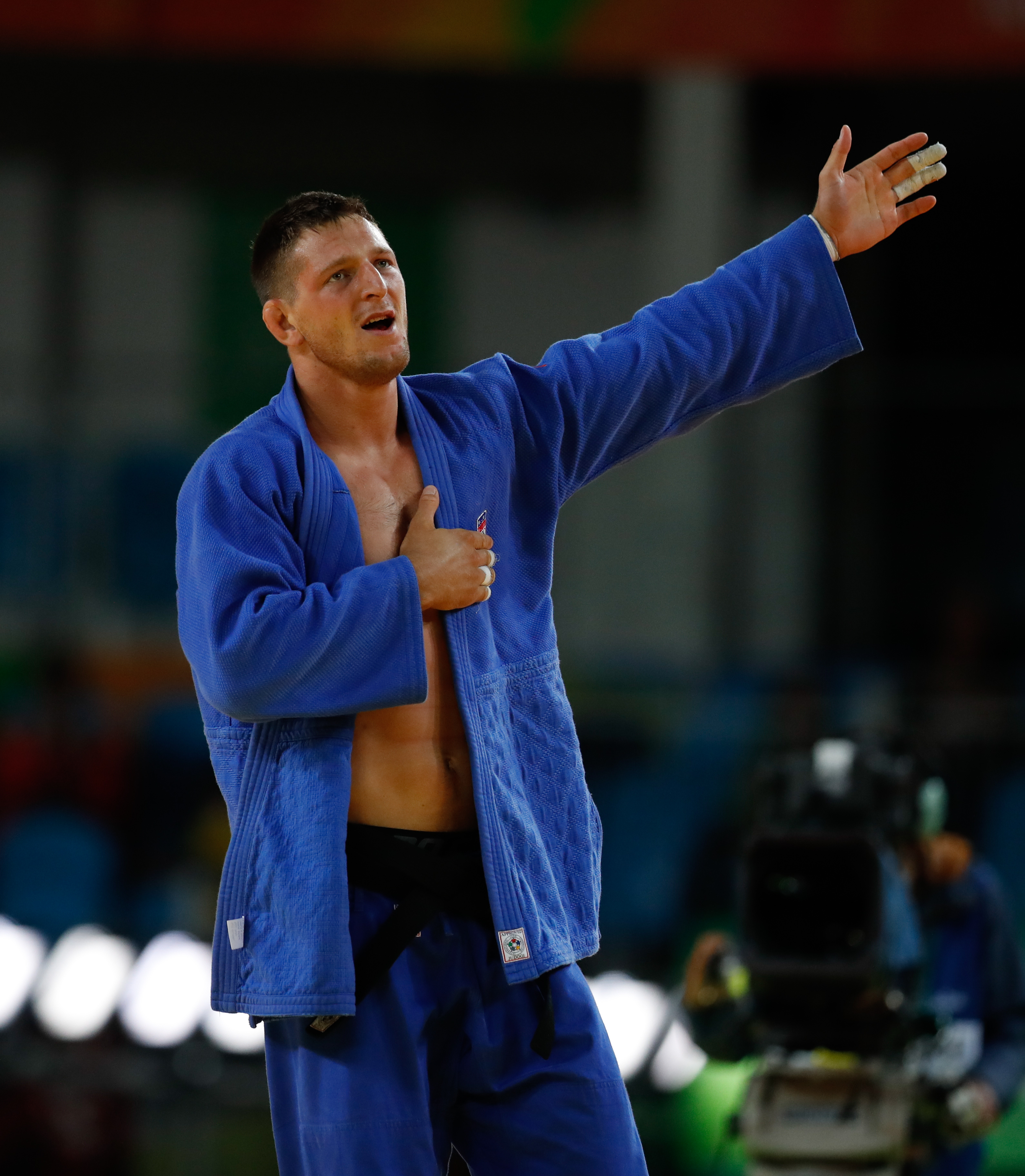
- Krpálek at the 2016 Summer Olympics

Personal information
- Nickname: Predator
- Born: 15 November 1990 (age 35) Jihlava, Czechoslovakia
- Occupation: Judoka
- Height: 198 cm (6 ft 6 in)
- Weight: 113 kg (249 lb)

Sport
- Country: Czech Republic
- Sport: Judo
- Weight class: ‍–‍100 kg, +100 kg
- Club: USK Judo Prag
- Coached by: Petr Lacina

Achievements and titles
- Olympic Games: (gold) (2016, 2020)
- World Champ.: (gold) (2014, 2019)
- European Champ.: (gold) (2013, 2014, 2018)
Medal record
Men's judo
Representing Czech Republic
Olympic Games
Gold medal – first place	2016 Rio de Janeiro	‍–‍100 kg
Gold medal – first place	2020 Tokyo	+100 kg
World Championships
Gold medal – first place	2014 Chelyabinsk	‍–‍100 kg
Gold medal – first place	2019 Tokyo	+100 kg
Silver medal – second place	2023 Doha	‍–‍100 kg
Bronze medal – third place	2011 Paris	‍–‍100 kg
Bronze medal – third place	2013 Rio de Janeiro	‍–‍100 kg
Bronze medal – third place	2026 Baku	+100 kg
European Games
Silver medal – second place	2015 Baku	‍–‍100 kg
European Championships
Gold medal – first place	2013 Budapest	‍–‍100 kg
Gold medal – first place	2014 Montpellier	‍–‍100 kg
Gold medal – first place	2018 Tel Aviv	+100 kg
Silver medal – second place	2026 Tbilisi	+100 kg
Bronze medal – third place	2017 Warsaw	+100 kg
Bronze medal – third place	2021 Lisbon	+100 kg
Bronze medal – third place	2025 Podgorica	+100 kg
World Masters
Silver medal – second place	2015 Rabat	‍–‍100 kg
Silver medal – second place	2019 Qingdao	+100 kg
Bronze medal – third place	2016 Guadalajara	‍–‍100 kg
IJF Grand Slam
Gold medal – first place	2013 Paris	‍–‍100 kg
Gold medal – first place	2013 Tokyo	‍–‍100 kg
Gold medal – first place	2022 Abu Dhabi	+100 kg
Silver medal – second place	2014 Paris	‍–‍100 kg
Silver medal – second place	2015 Abu Dhabi	‍–‍100 kg
Silver medal – second place	2017 Tokyo	+100 kg
Silver medal – second place	2018 Abu Dhabi	+100 kg
Silver medal – second place	2018 Osaka	+100 kg
Bronze medal – third place	2009 Tokyo	‍–‍100 kg
Bronze medal – third place	2015 Paris	‍–‍100 kg
Bronze medal – third place	2018 Paris	+100 kg
Bronze medal – third place	2019 Brasilia	+100 kg
Bronze medal – third place	2021 Antalya	+100 kg
Bronze medal – third place	2023 Tokyo	+100 kg
IJF Grand Prix
Gold medal – first place	2017 Antalya	+100 kg
Gold medal – first place	2017 Hohhot	+100 kg
Gold medal – first place	2018 Cancún	+100 kg
Gold medal – first place	2023 Linz	+100 kg
Gold medal – first place	2023 Zagreb	+100 kg
Gold medal – first place	2024 Linz	+100 kg
Gold medal – first place	2025 Lima	+100 kg
Silver medal – second place	2010 Düsseldorf	‍–‍100 kg
Silver medal – second place	2025 Linz	+100 kg
Silver medal – second place	2025 Guadalajara	+100 kg
Bronze medal – third place	2010 Abu Dhabi	‍–‍100 kg
Bronze medal – third place	2011 Düsseldorf	‍–‍100 kg
Bronze medal – third place	2013 Samsun	‍–‍100 kg
Bronze medal – third place	2015 Zagreb	‍–‍100 kg
Bronze medal – third place	2019 Antalya	+100 kg
Bronze medal – third place	2019 Hohhot	+100 kg
Bronze medal – third place	2019 Montreal	+100 kg
Bronze medal – third place	2023 Almada	‍–‍100 kg
Bronze medal – third place	2026 Qingdao	+100 kg
European U23 Championships
Gold medal – first place	2012 Prague	‍–‍100 kg
World Juniors Championships
Gold medal – first place	2008 Bangkok	‍–‍100 kg
Gold medal – first place	2009 Paris	‍–‍100 kg
European Junior Championships
Gold medal – first place	2008 Warsaw	‍–‍100 kg
Silver medal – second place	2009 Yerevan	‍–‍100 kg
European Cadet Championships
Silver medal – second place	2006 Miskolc	‍–‍90 kg
Summer Universiade
Gold medal – first place	2013 Kazan	‍–‍100 kg
Gold medal – first place	2013 Kazan	Open

Profile at external databases
- IJF: 613
- JudoInside.com: 41555
- Updated on 10 October 2026

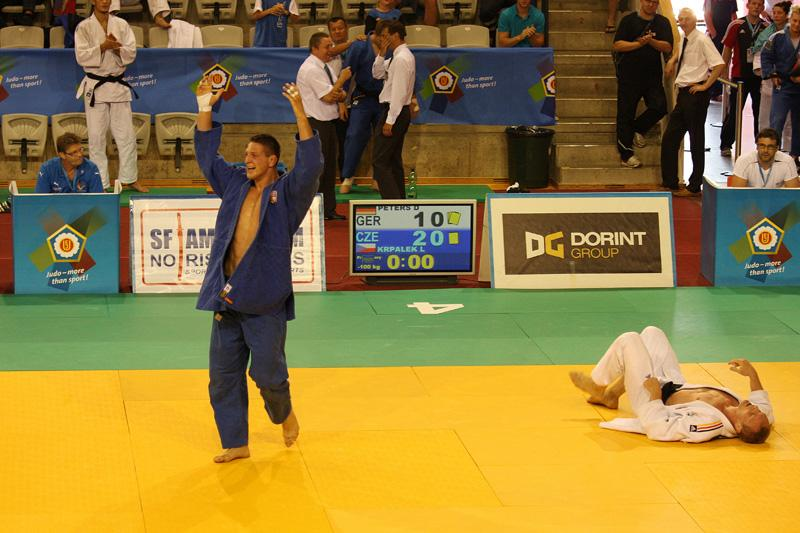
Krpálek at the 2012 Prague Grand Prix

Lukáš Krpálek (Czech pronunciation: [ˈlukaːʃ ˈkr̩paːlɛk]; born 15 November 1990) is a Czech heavyweight judoka. A former world champion (2014, 2019), European champion (2013, 2014, 2018) and Olympic Champion (2016, 2021). He is the most successful judoka in Czech and Czechoslovak history, and was named Czech Judoka of the Year eight times between 2008 and 2015.

== Personal life ==
Krpálek took up judo by chance – he wanted to train in karate, but his uncle mistook judo for karate. His brother Michal is also a judoka who served as a sparring partner for the Czech judo team at the 2012 Summer Olympics. In 2015 Krpálek married Eva Kaderková; they have a son Antonín, born in 2016.

Krpálek is an avid motorcycle collector and fisherman.

== Judo career ==
=== Junior ===
Krpálek took up judo when he was 6 years old in his hometown of Jihlava under the tutorship of Josef Šimáček. His first coach described him as very tall and slim with poor agility and technique. In 2005 Krpálek moved to a new club SCM Brno, where he was led by the coach Jaroslav Švec. In this year he also became a member of Czech national cadet judo team. In 2006 Krpálek achieved his first international success when he came in second at the Cadet European Judo Championships. From 2007, he was part of the national junior judo team, which was then led by Krpálek's current coach Petr Lacina. His first major success in the junior category came in 2007 when he finished 5th at the Junior European Judo Championships. Next year Krpálek became both the world and the European junior champion.

=== Senior ===
==== 2009–2011 ====
On 6 June 2009 Krpálek won his first senior Grand Prix tournament in Bucharest. In August the same year he participated in his first World Judo Championships, held in Rotterdam that year. He was defeated in the first round by the French judoka Cyrille Maret. Later in 2009 Krpálek was defeated in the final of the Junior European Judo Championships by Elmar Gasimov of Azerbaijan, who would become his great rival at senior level. However Krpálek became the world junior champion again that year. His biggest rival in 2011 was the Japanese judoka Takamasa Anai. He defeated Krpálek in the final of Grand Prix in Düsseldorf and later in the World Championships in Tokyo again, this time in the third round. At the European Championships in 2011 Krpálek placed fifth after being defeated by two Georgian judokas. In June he won three Grand Prix tournaments in a row and became the first Czech judoka since the independence of the country to win a medal at the World Judo Championships, when he won a bronze medal in Paris.

==== 2012 Olympics ====
At the start of the 2012 season, Krpálek was already guaranteed a spot at the 2012 Summer Olympic. At the beginning of the year, his preparation was complicated by a back injury. As a result, he was unable to train for a month; nonetheless he was able to win the Prague Grand Prix tournament in February. At the European Championships he was defeated in the second round by Zafar Machmadov. On 2 August Krpálek participated in the Olympic 100 kg tournament. His first match was in the second round against Japanese judoka Takamasa Anai, world champion from 2010. Krpálek won by ippon within 25 seconds. In the quarterfinals he fought against the reigning world champion at that time, Tagir Khaibulaev from Russia. With one minute remaining Krpálek was leading by one yuko, awarded after his successful Ōuchi gari technique. Fighting on the ground, Khaibulaev was able to get away from his opponents grip, then he proceeded to successfully hold Krpálek and was awarded an ippon. After the defeat Krpálek faced Henk Grol in a repechage, and again lost by ippon, this time via Ōuchi gari. Krpálek finished seventh overall.

==== 2013–2015 ====
Krpálek entered the new Olympic cycle with a victory at the Grand Slam Paris. Because of that, he received 500 points toward his IJF ranking, and on 13 February 2013, he became world no. 1 for the first time in his career. Soon afterwards he won the 2013 European Judo Championships in Budapest, beating Grol in the final. Later, because of his maturita exams, he missed several Grand Prix tournaments and lost his lead in world rankings. He enrolled at a university, which made him eligible for the 2013 Summer Universiade. There he won both the light heavyweight and open weight competitions. At the 2013 World Judo Championships in Rio de Janeiro Krpálek was defeated by Grol in the semi-finals, but won a bronze medal after defeating Japanese judoka Takashi Ono. In December he won the Grand Slam Tokyo. At the beginning of 2014 Krpálek was able to again reach the final of the Judo Grand Slam Paris, where he was defeated by the home judoka Cyrille Maret. Soon after Krpálek struggled through a series of minor injuries, yet he won the European Championships. Krpálek went to that year's World Championships in an excellent form. His hardest match came in the semi-finals where he faced Tagir Khaibulaev. Neither of the judokas was able to score, but Khaibulaev accumulated more shidos, and Krpálek went into the final. There he competed against José Armenteros, a Cuban judoka and surprise of the tournament. In the second half of the match Krpálek won by ippon via Oseakomi waza, winning his first senior world title. Because of health complications he didn't participate in another tournament for the rest of the year. In the first quarter of 2015 he continued to recover from his knee injury. Thus his first tournament that year was the Grand Prix in Zagreb where he came in third. At the end of June Krpálek went to the 2015 European Games in Baku. In the judo competition which that year served as the 2015 European Judo Championships as well, Krpálek lost in the finals to Henk Grol. At the 2015 World Judo Championships Krpálek finished fifth.

==== 2016 Olympics ====
In 2016 he once again participated in Grand Slam Paris, where he lost to the Japanese judoka Aaron Wolf in the second round. In late February Krpálek won the Noris Cup in Prague. Despite a shoulder injury, he decided to take part in 2016 European Judo Championships, where he lost to Grigori Minaskin in the first round. At that time Krpálek had been third in the world rankings and thus he had qualified for the 2016 Summer Olympics. Before the opening ceremony he was chosen by his fellow athletes as the flagbearer of the Czech team. Krpálek's Olympic campaign started on 11 August with a match against Jorge Fonseca of Portugal. Fonseca took an early lead after being awarded a yuko, but towards the end of the match Krpálek's physical superiority became apparent. In the last minute he had been awarded a waza-ari after a successful Sumi gaeshi, and won the match. Krpálek faced the Kazakh judoka Maxim Rakov next and won after his opponent was given two shidos. In the quarterfinals he fought against the reigning world champion Ryunosuke Haga of Japan. This match was similar to the previous one and after a careful performance, Krpálek won by a difference of one shido. Cyrille Maret was his opponent for the semi-finals. Throughout the match Krpálek stayed more active and led by one shido. With one minute remained he won by ippon through an Oseakomi waza. In the final Krpálek faced Elmar Gasimov. Both judokas tried to be active, but failed to score. Near the end Krpálek won by ippon via Ōuchi gari and became the Olympic champion. At the victory ceremony he paid tribute to his departed friend, judoka Alexandr Jurečka.

==== 2020 Olympics ====
Krpálek became the Olympic champion in the heavyweight division.

==== 2022 and Switch Back to Light Heavyweight ====
In January 2022, Krpalek announced that he would switch back to under 100 kg division (Light Heavyweight) to pursue his third Olympic gold medal. This would make him the first judoka in history to win three Olympic gold medals in two different weight classes.

== Style ==
Krpálek has been called an "intelligent beast" by his coach Petr Lacina. During the match he is able to stay calm and focused even in tense situations. He can force his own fighting style upon opponents and there are very few judokas who can outsmart him in this respect. As a junior Krpálek with his coach practised ground techniques especially, however in the senior category many of his opponents are able to defend against such attacks. Because of this, Krpálek lost some important matches in the beginning of his career, especially the quarterfinals at the 2012 Summer Olympics. Because of this defeat he focused on standing techniques such as Kumi kata. His signature moves became the Osoto gari in combination with Harai goshi or Uchi mata, yet Sumi gaeshi remained his Tokui waza (favorite personal technique).

Olympic Games
Preceded by Petra Kvitová; Tomáš Satoranský	Flagbearer for Czech Republic (with Marie Horáčková); Paris 2024	Succeeded by incumbent
Olympic Games
Preceded by Petr Koukal	Flagbearer for Czech Republic; Rio de Janeiro 2016	Succeeded by Petra Kvitová & Tomáš Satoranský
Awards
Preceded by Zuzana Hejnová; Ester Ledecká	Czech Athlete of the Year; 2016; 2019; 2021	Succeeded by Gabriela Soukalová; David Pastrňák; Ester Ledecká
Preceded by Ondřej Polívka	Czech Junior Athlete of the Year; 2008	Succeeded by Ondřej Polívka
