= Bekmurod Oltiboev =

Uzbekistani judoka (born 1996)

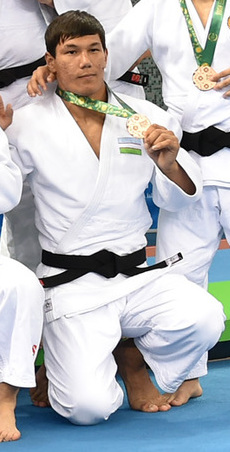
- Bekmurod Oltiboev in 2017

Personal information
- Born: 17 June 1996 (age 30)
- Occupation: Judoka

Sport
- Country: Uzbekistan
- Sport: Judo
- Weight class: +100 kg

Achievements and titles
- Olympic Games: 7th (2020)
- World Champ.: 5th (2018)
- Asian Champ.: (bronze) (2018, 2022)
Medal record
Men's judo
Representing Uzbekistan
World Championships
Bronze medal – third place	2021 Budapest	Mixed team
Asian Games
Bronze medal – third place	2018 Jakarta	+100 kg
Asian Championships
Bronze medal – third place	2022 Nur‑Sultan	+100 kg
IJF Grand Prix
Silver medal – second place	2018 Tashkent	+100 kg
Silver medal – second place	2019 Tashkent	+100 kg
Bronze medal – third place	2017 Tashkent	+100 kg
Bronze medal – third place	2018 Hohhot	+100 kg
Asian Junior Championships
Silver medal – second place	2015 Bangkok	‍–‍100 kg
Islamic Solidarity Games
Bronze medal – third place	2017 Baku	+100 kg
Military World Games
Silver medal – second place	2019 Wuhan	+100 kg

Profile at external databases
- IJF: 25349
- JudoInside.com: 106323
- Updated on 8 August 2022

Bekmurod Oltiboev (born 17 June 1996) is an Uzbekistani judoka. At the 2018 Asian Games held in Jakarta, Indonesia, he won one of the bronze medals in the men's +100 kg event.

At the 2019 Military World Games held in Wuhan, China, Oltiboev won the silver medal in the men's +100 kg event.

At the 2017 Islamic Solidarity Games held in Baku, Azerbaijan, Oltiboev won one of the bronze medals in the men's +100 kg event. In 2021, he competed in the men's +100 kg event at the World Judo Championships in Budapest, Hungary. He also competed in the men's +100 kg event at the 2020 Summer Olympics held in Tokyo, Japan.
