= Johannes Frey (judoka) =

German judoka (born 1996)

Personal information
- Born: 12 November 1996 (age 29)
- Occupation: Judoka

Sport
- Country: Germany
- Sport: Judo
- Weight class: +100 kg

Achievements and titles
- Olympic Games: R32 (2020)
- World Champ.: R16 (2019, 2022)
- European Champ.: (silver) (2022)
Medal record
Men's judo
Representing Germany
Olympic Games
Bronze medal – third place	2020 Tokyo	Mixed team
World Championships
Bronze medal – third place	2022 Tashkent	Mixed team
European Championships
Silver medal – second place	2022 Sofia	+100 kg
Bronze medal – third place	2024 Zagreb	Mixed team
IJF Grand Slam
Silver medal – second place	2020 Düsseldorf	+100 kg
Bronze medal – third place	2021 Kazan	+100 kg
IJF Grand Prix
Gold medal – first place	2018 Agadir	+100 kg
Silver medal – second place	2019 Perth	+100 kg
European Junior Championships
Silver medal – second place	2016 Málaga	‍–‍100 kg

Profile at external databases
- IJF: 19750
- JudoInside.com: 57952
- Updated on 16 October 2022

Johannes Frey (born 12 November 1996) is a German judoka.

Frey is the silver medalist of the 2020 Judo Grand Slam Düsseldorf and represented Germany at the 2020 Summer Olympics.
