= Ali Omar (judoka) =

Libyan judoka (born 1994)

Personal information
- Native name: علي عمر
- Born: 13 April 1994 (age 31) Tripoli, Libya
- Occupation: Judoka

Sport
- Country: Libya
- Sport: Judo

Profile at external databases
- IJF: 10394
- JudoInside.com: 41395

Ali Omar (Arabic: علي عمر, born 13 April 1994) is a Libyan judoka. He competed in the 2020 Summer Olympics. He won a bronze medal at the 2020 African Judo Championships.
