= Maciej Sarnacki =

Polish judoka (born 1987)

Personal information
- Born: 10 February 1987 (age 39) Olsztyn, Poland
- Occupation: Judoka
- Height: 2.00 m (6 ft 7 in)
- Weight: 130 kg (287 lb)

Sport
- Country: Poland
- Sport: Judo
- Weight class: +100 kg
- Club: Gwardia Olsztyn
- Coached by: Piotr Sadowski, Wojciech Sarnacki

Achievements and titles
- Olympic Games: R16 (2016)
- World Champ.: R16 (2013, 2014, 2018)
- European Champ.: 5th (2017)
Medal record
Men's judo
Representing Poland
IJF Grand Slam
Silver medal – second place	2017 Abu Dhabi	+100 kg
Bronze medal – third place	2014 Tyumen	+100 kg
Bronze medal – third place	2014 Abu Dhabi	+100 kg
Bronze medal – third place	2015 Tyumen	+100 kg
IJF Grand Prix
Silver medal – second place	2017 The Hague	+100 kg
Bronze medal – third place	2014 Jeju	+100 kg
Bronze medal – third place	2016 Tbilisi	+100 kg
Bronze medal – third place	2018 The Hague	+100 kg
Summer Universiade
Silver medal – second place	2011 Shenzhen	+100 kg
Bronze medal – third place	2013 Kazan	+100 kg

Profile at external databases
- IJF: 9443
- JudoInside.com: 34696
- Updated on 23 November 2022

Maciej Sarnacki (born 10 February 1987) is a Polish judoka. In 2021, he competed in the men's +100 kg event at the 2020 Summer Olympics held in Tokyo, Japan.

Sarnacki also competed in the men's +100 kg event at the 2016 Summer Olympics held in Rio de Janeiro, Brazil.
