= Iakiv Khammo =

Ukrainian judoka

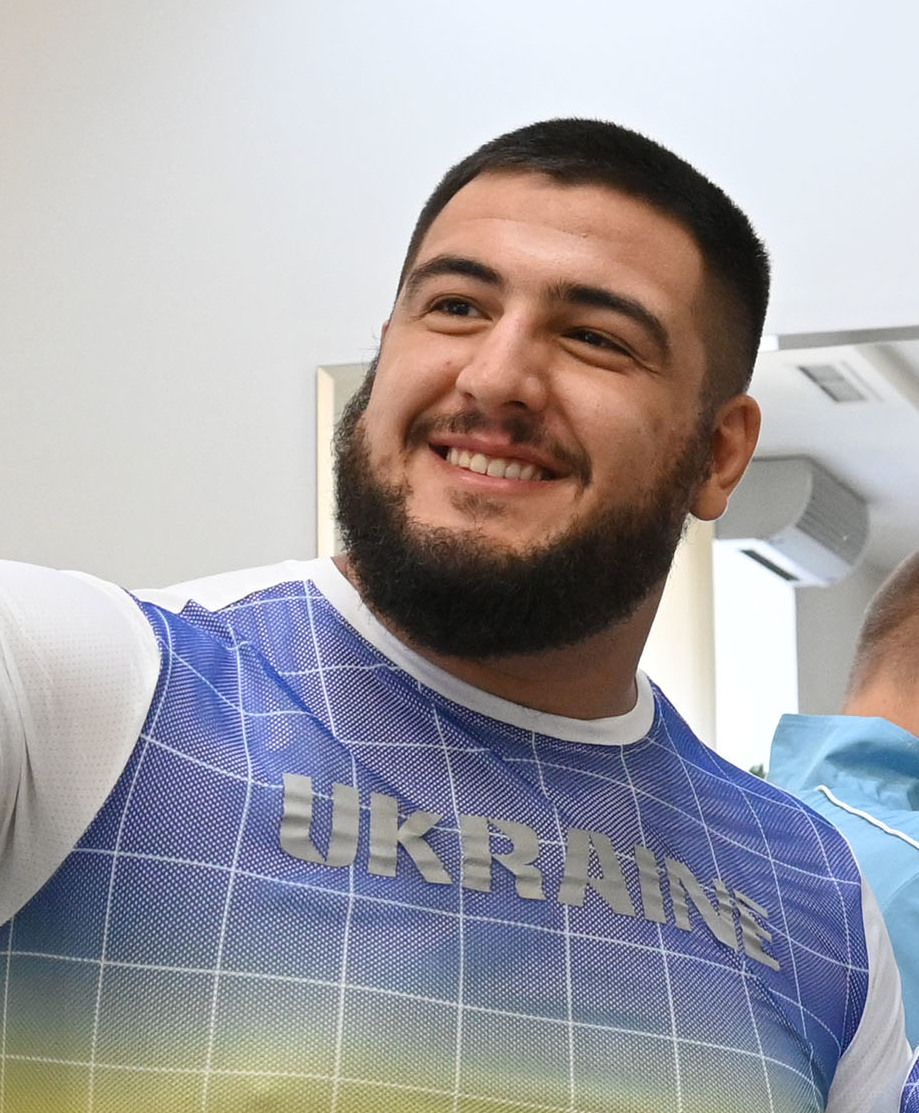

Personal information
- Native name: Я́ків Миха́йлович Хаммо
- Full name: Iakiv Mykhailovych Khammo
- Born: 11 June 1994 (age 32) Donetsk Oblast, Ukraine
- Occupation: Judoka
- Height: 1.88 m (6 ft 2 in)

Sport
- Country: Ukraine
- Sport: Judo
- Weight class: +100 kg

Achievements and titles
- Olympic Games: 5th (2020)
- World Champ.: (bronze) (2015, 2021)
- European Champ.: (bronze) (2015)
Medal record
Men's judo
Representing Ukraine
World Championships
Bronze medal – third place	2015 Astana	+100 kg
Bronze medal – third place	2021 Budapest	+100 kg
European Games
Bronze medal – third place	2015 Baku	+100 kg
Bronze medal – third place	2015 Baku	Men's team
World Masters
Bronze medal – third place	2021 Doha	+100 kg
IJF Grand Slam
Gold medal – first place	2016 Baku	+100 kg
Silver medal – second place	2015 Abu Dhabi	+100 kg
Silver medal – second place	2019 Abu Dhabi	+100 kg
IJF Grand Prix
Gold medal – first place	2015 Zagreb	+100 kg
Gold medal – first place	2016 Düsseldorf	+100 kg
Gold medal – first place	2018 The Hague	+100 kg
Silver medal – second place	2019 Tel Aviv	+100 kg
Bronze medal – third place	2018 Zagreb	+100 kg
Bronze medal – third place	2019 Tashkent	+100 kg
Bronze medal – third place	2020 Tel Aviv	+100 kg
European U23 Championships
Gold medal – first place	2016 Tel Aviv	+100 kg
World Juniors Championships
Bronze medal – third place	2014 Fort Lauderdale	+100 kg
European Junior Championships
Gold medal – first place	2014 Bucharest	+100 kg
Bronze medal – third place	2013 Sarajevo	+100 kg

Profile at external databases
- IJF: 14698
- JudoInside.com: 60278
- Updated on 21 May 2023

Iakiv (or Yakiv) Mykhailovych Khammo (Ukrainian: Я́ків Миха́йлович Хаммо; born 11 June 1994) is an Assyrian-Ukrainian judoka.

== Career ==
He is the 2015 World bronze medalist in the +100 kg category and competed at the 2016 Summer Olympics.

In 2021, he won one of the bronze medals in his event at the Judo World Masters held in Doha, Qatar.
