= Henk Grol =

Dutch judoka (born 1985)

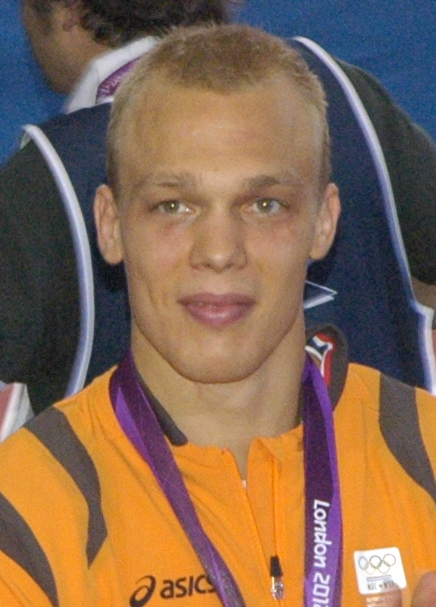
- Grol in 2012

Personal information
- Full name: Hindrik Harmannus Arnoldus Grol
- Nationality: Dutch
- Born: April 14, 1985 (age 41) Veendam, Netherlands
- Education: Johan Cruijff College
- Occupation: Judoka
- Height: 1.90 m (6 ft 3 in)
- Weight: 110 kg (243 lb)
- Website: henkgrol.nl

Sport
- Country: Netherlands
- Sport: Judo
- Weight class: –100 kg, +100 kg
- Club: Kenamju
- Coached by: Maarten Arens, Ronald Joorse

Achievements and titles
- Olympic Games: (bronze) (2008, 2012)
- World Champ.: (silver) (2009, 2010, 2013)
- European Champ.: (gold) (2008, 2015, 2016)
Medal record
Men's judo
Representing the Netherlands
Olympic Games
Bronze medal – third place	2008 Beijing	‍–‍100 kg
Bronze medal – third place	2012 London	‍–‍100 kg
World Championships
Silver medal – second place	2009 Rotterdam	‍–‍100 kg
Silver medal – second place	2010 Tokyo	‍–‍100 kg
Silver medal – second place	2013 Rio de Janeiro	‍–‍100 kg
European Games
Gold medal – first place	2015 Baku	‍–‍100 kg
Bronze medal – third place	2019 Minsk	+100 kg
European Championships
Gold medal – first place	2008 Lisbon	‍–‍100 kg
Gold medal – first place	2016 Kazan	‍–‍100 kg
Silver medal – second place	2009 Tbilisi	‍–‍100 kg
Silver medal – second place	2010 Vienna	‍–‍100 kg
Silver medal – second place	2013 Budapest	‍–‍100 kg
Silver medal – second place	2021 Lisbon	+100 kg
Bronze medal – third place	2018 Tel Aviv	+100 kg
World Masters
Silver medal – second place	2012 Almaty	‍–‍100 kg
Silver medal – second place	2013 Tyumen	‍–‍100 kg
Bronze medal – third place	2019 Qingdao	+100 kg
Bronze medal – third place	2021 Doha	+100 kg
IJF Grand Slam
Gold medal – first place	2011 Paris	‍–‍100 kg
Gold medal – first place	2018 Osaka	+100 kg
Gold medal – first place	2020 Paris	+100 kg
Silver medal – second place	2018 Ekaterinburg	+100 kg
Bronze medal – third place	2013 Paris	‍–‍100 kg
Bronze medal – third place	2014 Paris	‍–‍100 kg
Bronze medal – third place	2014 Tokyo	‍–‍100 kg
Bronze medal – third place	2018 Abu Dhabi	+100 kg
IJF Grand Prix
Gold medal – first place	2010 Rotterdam	‍–‍100 kg
Gold medal – first place	2011 Baku	‍–‍100 kg
Gold medal – first place	2011 Abu Dhabi	‍–‍100 kg
Gold medal – first place	2011 Amsterdam	‍–‍100 kg
Gold medal – first place	2014 Budapest	‍–‍100 kg
Silver medal – second place	2009 Hamburg	‍–‍100 kg
Bronze medal – third place	2015 Düsseldorf	‍–‍100 kg
World Juniors Championships
Bronze medal – third place	2004 Budapest	‍–‍90 kg
European Junior Championships
Gold medal – first place	2003 Sarajevo	‍–‍81 kg
Bronze medal – third place	2004 Sofia	‍–‍90 kg

Profile at external databases
- IJF: 285
- JudoInside.com: 14777
- Updated on 25 May 2023

Hindrik Harmannus Arnoldus "Henk" Grol (born 14 April 1985 in Veendam) is a retired Dutch judoka.

== Judo career ==
Grol competed in the 2007 European Judo Championships in Belgrade, Serbia in the men's under 90 kg, as a replacement for Mark Huizinga, who cancelled last minute due to personal problems.

He won gold in the men's under 100-kilo class at the 2008 European Judo Championships in Lisbon, Portugal. He was the youngest European Champion of that year, only 22 years old.

After a highly competitive race against Elco van der Geest, Grol ended up being the 2008 representative for the men's 100 kg category for the Netherlands at the 2008 Olympics in Beijing. There, he reached the semifinals, where he was beaten by Askhat Zhitkeyev from Kazakhstan. He went on to win bronze, beating Levan Zhorzholiani from Georgia.

He competed at the 2012 Summer Olympics, reaching the quarter-finals, where he lost to Dimitri Peters of Germany. Grol went on to win the bronze medal, beating Hwang Hee-tae in his bronze medal match.

He competed at the 2018 European Judo Championships in Tel Aviv where he ended third.

In 2021, he won one of the bronze medals in his event at the 2021 Judo World Masters held in Doha, Qatar.

== Outside of Judo ==
After the 2016 Olympics in Rio de Janeiro he considered starting a mixed martial arts career and trained with Gegard Mousasi in Amsterdam. Eventually he decided to quit training MMA due to safety considerations.
