= 2023 World Judo Championships – Men's +100 kg =

Judo competition

Judo Men's 100 kg at the 2023 World Judo Championships
- Venue: Ali Bin Hamad Al Attiya Arena
- Location: Doha, Qatar
- Date: 12 May 2023
- Competitors: 43 from 35 nations
- Total prize money: €57,000

Medalists
| gold medal | Teddy Riner (9th title) | France |
| gold medal | Inal Tasoev (Note: During the final between Teddy Riner and Inal Tasoev, there was one situation where neither the referee on the mat nor the IJF Refereeing Commission gave any score. Following a thorough expert analysis, according to the current refereeing rules, a score could have been awarded for Inal Tasoev's counterattack. Therefore, the IJF declares both athletes as the winners of the contest and award a gold medal and the corresponding ranking points to Inal Tasoev.) (1st title) |
| bronze medal | Alisher Yusupov | Uzbekistan |
| bronze medal | Rafael Silva | Brazil |

Competition at external databases
- Links: IJF • JudoInside

The Men's +100 kg event at the 2023 World Judo Championships was held at the Ali Bin Hamad al-Attiyah Arena in Doha, Qatar on 13 May 2023.

== Results ==
=== Finals ===
Semi-finals
(Tajikistan) Temur Rakhimov | 00
(France) Teddy Riner | 10
(Uzbekistan) Alisher Yusupov | 00
Inal Tasoev | 10

Final
(France) Teddy Riner | 01
Inal Tasoev | 00

=== Repechage ===
Repechage
(Japan) Kokoro Kageura | 10
(Japan) Tatsuru Saito | 00
(Brazil) Rafael Silva | 10
(Cuba) Andy Granda | 00

Bronze medal
(Japan) Kokoro Kageura | 01
(Uzbekistan) Alisher Yusupov | 10
(Brazil) Rafael Silva | 01
(Tajikistan) Temur Rakhimov | 00

=== Pool A ===
First round
(Morocco) Mohammed Lahboub | 00
(South Korea) Kim Min-jong | 10
(Germany) Jonas Schreiber | 00
Tamerlan Bashaev | 10
(Slovenia) Enej Marinič | 10
(Netherlands) Jelle Snippe | 01

Round of 32
(Tajikistan) Temur Rakhimov | 10
(Guinea) Moustapha Fofana | 00
(South Korea) Kim Min-jong | 00
(United Arab Emirates) Magomedomar Magomedomarov | 10
(Japan) Kokoro Kageura | 10
Tamerlan Bashaev | 00
(Slovenia) Enej Marinič | 00
(China) Li Ruixuan | 10

Round of 16
(Tajikistan) Temur Rakhimov | 10
(United Arab Emirates) Magomedomar Magomedomarov | 00
(Japan) Kokoro Kageura | 11
(China) Li Ruixuan | 00

Quarter-finals
(Tajikistan) Temur Rakhimov | 10
(Japan) Kokoro Kageura | 00

=== Pool B ===
First round
(Bahrain) Azamat Chotchaev | 11
(United States) Christian Konoval | 00
(Romania) Vlăduț Simionescu | 00
(France) Teddy Riner | 10
(Brazil) João Cesarino | 01
(Angola) Piter da Silva | 10

Round of 32
(Mongolia) Odkhüügiin Tsetsentsengel | 02
(Bahrain) Azamat Chotchaev | 00
(France) Teddy Riner | 10
(Poland) Kacper Szczurowski | 00
(Japan) Tatsuru Saito | 10
(Angola) Piter da Silva | 00
(Uzbekistan) Shokhrukhkhon Bakhtiyorov | 01
(Georgia (country)) Guram Tushishvili | 02

Round of 16
(Mongolia) Odkhüügiin Tsetsentsengel | 00
(France) Teddy Riner | 10
(Japan) Tatsuru Saito | 10
(Georgia (country)) Guram Tushishvili | 00

Quarter-finals
(France) Teddy Riner | 10
(Japan) Tatsuru Saito | 00

=== Pool C ===
First round
(Slovakia) Márius Fízeľ | 00
(Slovenia) Vito Dragič | 10
(Kazakhstan) Galymzhan Krikbay | 10
(Cyprus) Giannis Antoniou | 00
(Germany) Losseni Kone | 10
(Turkey) Münir Ertuğ | 00

Round of 32
(Uzbekistan) Alisher Yusupov | 10
(Slovenia) Vito Dragič | 00
(Kazakhstan) Galymzhan Krikbay | 10
(Estonia) Karl Priilinn-Türk | 00
(Brazil) Rafael Silva | 10
(Ecuador) Freddy Figueroa | 00
(Germany) Losseni Kone | 10
(Chile) Francisco Solis | 00

Round of 16
(Uzbekistan) Alisher Yusupov | 02
(Kazakhstan) Galymzhan Krikbay | 00
(Brazil) Rafael Silva | 01
(Germany) Losseni Kone | 00

Quarter-finals
(Uzbekistan) Alisher Yusupov | 02
(Brazil) Rafael Silva | 00

=== Pool D ===
First round
(Senegal) Mbagnick Ndiaye | 10
(Romania) Mircea Croitoru | 00
(New Zealand) Kody Andrews | 00
(Azerbaijan) Ushangi Kokauri | 10

Round of 32
(Cuba) Andy Granda | 10
(Senegal) Mbagnick Ndiaye | 00
(Hungary) Richárd Sipőcz | 02
(Algeria) Mohamed Sofiane Belrekaa | 00
(Netherlands) Roy Meyer | 00
Inal Tasoev | 01
(Azerbaijan) Ushangi Kokauri | 10
(Finland) Martti Puumalainen | 00

Round of 16
(Cuba) Andy Granda | 10
(Hungary) Richárd Sipőcz | 00
Inal Tasoev | 10
(Azerbaijan) Ushangi Kokauri | 00

Quarter-finals
(Cuba) Andy Granda | 00
Inal Tasoev | 01

== Prize money ==
The sums listed bring the total prizes awarded to €57,000 for the individual event.

| Medal | Total | Judoka | Coach |
|---|---|---|---|
| Gold | €26,000 | €20,800 | €5,200 |
| Silver | €15,000 | €12,000 | €3,000 |
| Bronze | €8,000 | €6,400 | €1,600 |
