= 2024 World Judo Championships – Men's +100 kg =

Judo competition

Judo Men's +100 kg at the 2024 World Judo Championships
- Venue: Mubadala Arena
- Location: Abu Dhabi, United Arab Emirates
- Date: 23 May 2024
- Competitors: 40 from 34 nations
- Total prize money: €57,000

Medalists
gold medal	Kim Min-jong (1st title)	South Korea
silver medal	Guram Tushishvili	Georgia
bronze medal	Tamerlan Bashaev
bronze medal	Alisher Yusupov	Uzbekistan

Competition at external databases
- Links: IJF • JudoInside

The Men's +100 kg event at the 2024 World Judo Championships was held at the Mubadala Arena in Abu Dhabi, United Arab Emirates on 23 May 2024.

== Results ==
=== Finals ===
Semi-finals
(Uzbekistan) Alisher Yusupov	01 (yellow card)
(Georgia (country)) Guram Tushishvili	02
(Czech Republic) Lukáš Krpálek	00
(South Korea) Kim Min-jong	01 (yellow card)

Final
(Georgia (country)) Guram Tushishvili	00
(South Korea) Kim Min-jong	10

=== Repechage ===
Repechage
(Tajikistan) Temur Rakhimov	00
Tamerlan Bashaev	10
(Cuba) Andy Granda	11 (yellow card)
(Slovakia) Márius Fízeľ	00

Bronze medal
Tamerlan Bashaev	01
(Czech Republic) Lukáš Krpálek	00
(Cuba) Andy Granda	00
(Uzbekistan) Alisher Yusupov	02

=== Pool A ===
First round
(Japan) Hyōga Ōta	10
(Senegal) Mbagnick Ndiaye	00
(Bahrain) Azamat Chotchaev	11
(Kazakhstan) Yerassyl Kazhibayev	01

Round of 32
(Tajikistan) Temur Rakhimov	01
(Japan) Hyōga Ōta	00
(Hungary) Richárd Sipőcz	00
(Netherlands) Jelle Snippe	10
(Uzbekistan) Alisher Yusupov	10
(Bahrain) Azamat Chotchaev	00 (yellow card)
(Mongolia) Odkhüügiin Tsetsentsengel	00
(Germany) Losseni Kone	10

Round of 16
(Tajikistan) Temur Rakhimov	01 (yellow card)
(Netherlands) Jelle Snippe	00 (yellow card)
(Uzbekistan) Alisher Yusupov	02
(Germany) Losseni Kone	00

Quarter-finals
(Tajikistan) Temur Rakhimov	00 (yellow card)
(Uzbekistan) Alisher Yusupov	02 (yellow card)

=== Pool B ===
First round
(Indonesia) I Gede Agastya Darma Wardana	00
(Algeria) Mohamed El Mehdi Lili	11
(Poland) Kacper Szczurowski	01
(Slovenia) Enej Marinič	00

Round of 32
(Georgia (country)) Guram Tushishvili	11 (yellow card)
(Algeria) Mohamed El Mehdi Lili	00
(Romania) Vlăduț Simionescu	00
(Turkey) İbrahim Tataroğlu	10
Tamerlan Bashaev	10 (yellow card)
(Estonia) Karl Priilinn-Türk	00
(Poland) Kacper Szczurowski	10
(Serbia) Igor Vračar	00

Round of 16
(Georgia (country)) Guram Tushishvili	02
(Turkey) İbrahim Tataroğlu	00
Tamerlan Bashaev	10
(Poland) Kacper Szczurowski	00

Quarter-finals
(Georgia (country)) Guram Tushishvili	01 (yellow card)
Tamerlan Bashaev	00 (yellow card)

=== Pool C ===
First round
(Turkey) Münir Ertuğ	00
(United Arab Emirates) Magomedomar Magomedomarov	11 (yellow card)
(Montenegro) Anto Dubreta	00
(Georgia (country)) Saba Inaneishvili	02 (yellow card)

Round of 32
(Cuba) Andy Granda	10
(Guinea-Bissau) Bubacar Mane	00
(United Arab Emirates) Magomedomar Magomedomarov	02 (yellow card)
(Austria) Movli Borchashvilli	00
(Czech Republic) Lukáš Krpálek	10 (yellow card)
(Georgia (country)) Saba Inaneishvili	00 (yellow card)
(Slovenia) Vito Dragič	10
(Cyprus) Giannis Antoniou	00 (yellow card)

Round of 16
(Cuba) Andy Granda	10 (yellow card)
(United Arab Emirates) Magomedomar Magomedomarov	00
(Czech Republic) Lukáš Krpálek	10
(Slovenia) Vito Dragič	00

Quarter-finals
(Cuba) Andy Granda	00
(Czech Republic) Lukáš Krpálek	02 (yellow card)

=== Pool D ===
First round
(Ukraine) Yevheniy Balyevskyy	10
(Germany) Erik Abramov	00 (yellow card)
(United States) Philip Horiuchi	01
(Guinea) Moustapha Fofana	00 (yellow card)

Round of 32
(South Korea) Kim Min-jong	10
(Ukraine) Yevheniy Balyevskyy	00
(China) Li Ruixuan	00
(Netherlands) Jur Spijkers	02
(Finland) Martti Puumalainen	00
Valeriy Endovitskiy	10 (yellow card)
(United States) Philip Horiuchi	00
(Slovakia) Márius Fízeľ	10

Round of 16
(South Korea) Kim Min-jong	11
(Netherlands) Jur Spijkers	00
Valeriy Endovitskiy	00 (yellow card)
(Slovakia) Márius Fízeľ	01

Quarter-finals
(South Korea) Kim Min-jong	10
(Slovakia) Márius Fízeľ	00 (yellow card)

== Prize money ==
The sums listed bring the total prizes awarded to €57,000 for the individual event.

Medal	Total	Judoka	Coach
Gold	€26,000	€20,800	€5,200
Silver	€15,000	€12,000	€3,000
Bronze	€8,000	€6,400	€1,600
