= 2022 World Judo Championships – Men's +100 kg =

Judo competition

Judo Men's +100 kg at the 2022 World Judo Championships
- Venue: Humo Ice Dome
- Location: Tashkent, Uzbekistan
- Date: 12 October
- Competitors: 36 from 31 nations
- Total prize money: €57,000

Medalists
gold medal	Andy Granda (1st title)	Cuba
silver medal	Tatsuru Saito	Japan
bronze medal	Guram Tushishvili	Georgia
bronze medal	Kim Min-jong	South Korea

Competition at external databases
- Links: IJF • JudoInside

The Men's +100 kg event at the 2022 World Judo Championships was held at the Humo Ice Dome arena in Tashkent, Uzbekistan on 12 October 2022.

== Results ==
=== Finals ===
Semi-finals
(Cuba) Andy Granda	10
(Netherlands) Roy Meyer	00
(Japan) Tatsuru Saito	10
(Tajikistan) Temur Rakhimov	00

Final
(Cuba) Andy Granda	10
(Japan) Tatsuru Saito	00

=== Repechage ===
Repechage
(Georgia (country)) Guram Tushishvili	11
(Uzbekistan) Alisher Yusupov	01
(Ukraine) Iakiv Khammo	00
(South Korea) Kim Min-jong	10

Bronze medal
(Georgia (country)) Guram Tushishvili	01
(Tajikistan) Temur Rakhimov	00
(South Korea) Kim Min-jong	01
(Netherlands) Roy Meyer	00

=== Pool A ===
First round
(Romania) ~~Vlăduț Simionescu~~
(Slovenia) Vito Dragič	w/o

Round of 32
(Georgia (country)) Guram Tushishvili	10
(Slovenia) Vito Dragič	00
(Guinea) Moustapha Fofana	00
(Germany) Johannes Frey	10
(Cuba) Andy Granda	01
(Hungary) Richárd Sipőcz	00
(Ivory Coast) Boduit Polneau	00
(Austria) Daniel Allerstorfer	10

Round of 16
(Georgia (country)) Guram Tushishvili	10
(Germany) Johannes Frey	01
(Cuba) Andy Granda	11
(Austria) Daniel Allerstorfer	00

Quarter-finals
(Georgia (country)) Guram Tushishvili	00
(Cuba) Andy Granda	10

=== Pool B ===
First round
(Canada) Marc Deschenes	00
(China) Li Ruixuan	01

Round of 32
(Brazil) Rafael Silva	10
(China) Li Ruixuan	00
(Kazakhstan) Yerassyl Kazhybayev	00
(Uzbekistan) Alisher Yusupov	10
(Mongolia) Odkhüügiin Tsetsentsengel	10
(New Zealand) Kody Andrews	00
(Netherlands) Roy Meyer	01
(Italy) Lorenzo Agro	00

Round of 16
(Brazil) Rafael Silva	00
(Uzbekistan) Alisher Yusupov	10
(Mongolia) Odkhüügiin Tsetsentsengel	00
(Netherlands) Roy Meyer	10

Quarter-finals
(Uzbekistan) Alisher Yusupov	00
(Netherlands) Roy Meyer	01

=== Pool C ===
First round
(Israel) Serafim Kompaniez	00
(Senegal) Mbagnick Ndiaye	10

Round of 32
(Netherlands) Jur Spijkers	00
(Japan) Tatsuru Saito	10
(Dominican Republic) José Nova	11
(Senegal) Mbagnick Ndiaye	00
(Ukraine) Iakiv Khammo	10
(Uzbekistan) Shokhrukhkhon Bakhtiyorov	00
(Bahrain) Azamat Chotchaev	10
(Cuba) Omar Cruz	00

Round of 16
(Japan) Tatsuru Saito	10
(Dominican Republic) José Nova	00
(Ukraine) Iakiv Khammo	10
(Bahrain) Azamat Chotchaev	00

Quarter-finals
(Japan) Tatsuru Saito	10
(Ukraine) Iakiv Khammo	00

=== Pool D ===
First round
(Slovakia) Márius Fízeľ	11
(United States) Christian Konoval	00

Round of 32
(Tajikistan) Temur Rakhimov	10
(Slovakia) Márius Fízeľ	00
(Slovenia) Enej Marinič	00
(France) Joseph Terhec	10
(Czech Republic) Lukáš Krpálek	01
(Finland) Martti Puumalainen	00
(Germany) Jonas Schreiber	00
(South Korea) Kim Min-jong	10

Round of 16
(Tajikistan) Temur Rakhimov	10
(France) Joseph Terhec	00
(Czech Republic) Lukáš Krpálek	00
(South Korea) Kim Min-jong	10

Quarter-finals
(Tajikistan) Temur Rakhimov	01
(South Korea) Kim Min-jong	00
