= 2025 European Judo Championships – Men's +100 kg =

Judo competition

Judo Men's +100 kg at the 2025 European Judo Championships
- Venue: Morača Sports Center
- Location: Podgorica, Montenegro
- Date: 26 April 2025
- Competitors: 27 from 18 nations

Medalists
gold medal	Inal Tasoev (3rd title)
silver medal	Valeriy Endovitskiy
bronze medal	Erik Abramov	Germany
bronze medal	Lukáš Krpálek	Czech Republic

Competition at external databases
- Links: IJF • JudoInside

The men's +100 kg competition at the 2025 European Judo Championships was held at the Morača Sports Center in Podgorica, Montenegro on 26 April 2025.

== Results ==
=== Finals ===
Semi-finals
(International Judo Federation) Inal Tasoev	001 (yellow card)
(Czech Republic) Lukáš Krpálek	000
(Azerbaijan) Ushangi Kokauri	000 (yellow card)
(International Judo Federation) Valeriy Endovitskiy	100

Final
Inal Tasoev	001 (yellow card)
Valeriy Endovitskiy	000 (yellow card)

=== Repechage ===
Repechage
(Finland) Martti Puumalainen	000
(Germany) Erik Abramov	100
(Turkey) Recep Ergin	000
(Ukraine) Yevheniy Balyevskyy	100

Bronze medal
(Germany) Erik Abramov	101 (yellow card)
(Azerbaijan) Ushangi Kokauri	010
(Ukraine) Yevheniy Balyevskyy	000 (yellow card)
(Czech Republic) Lukáš Krpálek	100 (yellow card)

=== Pool A ===
First round
(Austria) Stephan Hegyi	010 (yellow card)
(Cyprus) Giannis Antoniou	000
(Finland) Martti Puumalainen	100 (yellow card)
(Ukraine) Iakiv Khammo	000
(Netherlands) Jur Spijkers	110
(International Judo Federation) Yahor Kukharenka	000

Round of 16
(International Judo Federation) Inal Tasoev	100 (yellow card)
(Austria) Stephan Hegyi	000
(Finland) Martti Puumalainen	100
(Netherlands) Jur Spijkers	000

Quarter-finals
(International Judo Federation) Inal Tasoev	100
(Finland) Martti Puumalainen	000 (yellow card)

=== Pool B ===
First round
(Poland) Grzegorz Teresiński	101 (yellow card)
(Estonia) Karl Priilinn-Türk	000
(Germany) Erik Abramov	001 (yellow card)
(Belgium) Toma Nikiforov	000 (yellow card)

Round of 16
(Czech Republic) Lukáš Krpálek	010 (yellow card)
(Poland) Grzegorz Teresiński	000
(Turkey) İbrahim Tataroğlu	000
(Germany) Erik Abramov	100

Quarter-finals
(Czech Republic) Lukáš Krpálek	100
(Germany) Erik Abramov	000

=== Pool C ===
First round
(Belgium) Yves Ndao	000
(Turkey) Recep Ergin	001
(Azerbaijan) Ushangi Kokauri	021 (yellow card)
(Poland) Patryk Broniec	000 (yellow card)
(Slovakia) Márius Fízeľ	001
(Croatia) Mikita Sviryd	000

Round of 16
(Georgia (country)) Guram Tushishvili	000
(Turkey) Recep Ergin	102
(Azerbaijan) Ushangi Kokauri	010 (yellow card)
(Slovakia) Márius Fízeľ	000 (yellow card)

Quarter-finals
(Turkey) Recep Ergin	001 (yellow card)
(Azerbaijan) Ushangi Kokauri	110

=== Pool D ===
First round
(Austria) Movli Borchashvilli	100 (yellow card)
(Montenegro) Slobodan Vukić	000
(Netherlands) Jelle Snippe	100
(Serbia) Igor Vračar	000 (yellow card)
(Ukraine) Yevheniy Balyevskyy	020
(Germany) Losseni Kone	000 (yellow card)

Round of 16
(International Judo Federation) Valeriy Endovitskiy	110
(Austria) Movli Borchashvilli	000
(Netherlands) Jelle Snippe	000
(Ukraine) Yevheniy Balyevskyy	001

Quarter-finals
(International Judo Federation) Valeriy Endovitskiy	001
(Ukraine) Yevheniy Balyevskyy	000
