= 2026 World Judo Championships – Men's +100 kg =

Judo competition

Judo Men's +100 kg at the 2026 World Judo Championships
- Venue: National Gymnastics Arena
- Location: Baku, Azerbaijan
- Date: 10 October 2026
- Competitors: 41 from 32 nations
- Total prize money: €57,000

Medalists
gold medal	Inal Tasoev (3rd title)	Russia
silver medal	Ushangi Kokauri	Azerbaijan
bronze medal	Lukáš Krpálek	Czech Republic
bronze medal	Kanan Nasibov	Azerbaijan

Competition at external databases
- Links: IJF • JudoInside

The men's +100 kg event at the 2026 World Judo Championships was held at the National Gymnastics Arena in Baku, Azerbaijan on 10 October 2026.

== Results ==
=== Finals ===
Semi-finals
(Russia) Inal Tasoev	110
(Azerbaijan) Dzhamal Gamzatkhanov	000
(Finland) Martti Puumalainen	000
(Azerbaijan) Ushangi Kokauri	102 (yellow card)

Final
(Russia) Inal Tasoev	100 (yellow card)
(Azerbaijan) Ushangi Kokauri	000 (yellow card)

=== Repechage ===
Repechage
(Czech Republic) Lukáš Krpálek	100
(Netherlands) Jur Spijkers	000
(Russia) Valeriy Endovitskiy	000 (yellow card)
(Azerbaijan) Kanan Nasibov	001

Bronze medal
(Czech Republic) Lukáš Krpálek	020 (yellow card)
(Finland) Martti Puumalainen	000 (yellow card)
(Azerbaijan) Kanan Nasibov	100 (yellow card)
(Azerbaijan) Dzhamal Gamzatkhanov	000

=== Pool A ===
First round
(Serbia) Igor Vračar	010
(Montenegro) Stefan Kovinić	100 (yellow card)
(Romania) Darius Dobre	000
(Estonia) Marek-Adrian Mäsak	110

Round of 32
(Russia) Inal Tasoev	100
(Montenegro) Stefan Kovinić	000
(South Korea) Kim Min-jong	000 (yellow card)
(Japan) Kanta Nakano	100 (yellow card)
(Czech Republic) Lukáš Krpálek	001
(Canada) John Messe A Bessong	000
(Estonia) Marek-Adrian Mäsak	000
(United Arab Emirates) Magomedomar Magomedomarov	021 (yellow card)

Round of 16
(Russia) Inal Tasoev	100
(Japan) Kanta Nakano	001 (yellow card)
(Czech Republic) Lukáš Krpálek	001
(United Arab Emirates) Magomedomar Magomedomarov	000

Quarter-finals
(Russia) Inal Tasoev	001 (yellow card)
(Czech Republic) Lukáš Krpálek	000 (yellow card)

=== Pool B ===
First round
(Chile) Francisco Solis	000 (yellow card)
(Azerbaijan) Dzhamal Gamzatkhanov	101 (yellow card)
(Slovakia) Márius Fízeľ	000
(Mongolia) Batkhuyagiin Gonchigsüren	100
(Ukraine) Yevheniy Balyevskyy	110
Adnan Khankan	000

Round of 32
(Georgia (country)) Irakli Demetrashvili	000 (yellow card)
(Uzbekistan) Muzaffarbek Turoboyev	100
(Azerbaijan) Dzhamal Gamzatkhanov	020 (yellow card)
(Croatia) Mikita Sviryd	000 (yellow card)
(Netherlands) Jur Spijkers	100 (yellow card)
(Mongolia) Batkhuyagiin Gonchigsüren	000
(Ukraine) Yevheniy Balyevskyy	100
(Turkey) İbrahim Tataroğlu	000

Round of 16
(Uzbekistan) Muzaffarbek Turoboyev	000 (yellow card)
(Azerbaijan) Dzhamal Gamzatkhanov	001 (yellow card)
(Netherlands) Jur Spijkers	001
(Ukraine) Yevheniy Balyevskyy	000 (yellow card)

Quarter-finals
(Azerbaijan) Dzhamal Gamzatkhanov	001
(Netherlands) Jur Spijkers	000

=== Pool C ===
First round
(Georgia (country)) Guram Tushishvili	020
(Mongolia) Odkhüügiin Tsetsentsengel	000 (yellow card)
(China) Li Haiyang	000
(South Korea) Lee Seung-yeob	001

Round of 32
(Russia) Valeriy Endovitskiy	003
(Cyprus) Giannis Antoniou	001
(Georgia (country)) Guram Tushishvili	020
(Guinea) Moustapha Fofana	000
(Finland) Martti Puumalainen	100
(South Korea) Lee Seung-yeob	000
(Austria) Movli Borchashvilli	000 (yellow card)
(Uganda) Akira Nakajima	100 (yellow card)

Round of 16
(Russia) Valeriy Endovitskiy	010 (yellow card)
(Georgia (country)) Guram Tushishvili	000
(Finland) Martti Puumalainen	100 (yellow card)
(Uganda) Akira Nakajima	000

Quarter-finals
(Russia) Valeriy Endovitskiy	000 (yellow card)
(Finland) Martti Puumalainen	001

=== Pool D ===
First round
(Poland) Jakub Sordyl	020
(Algeria) Mohamed El Mehdi Lili	000 (yellow card)
(Germany) Losseni Kone	100
(Serbia) Vidak Maljević	000

Round of 32
(Azerbaijan) Ushangi Kokauri	100 (yellow card)
(Kyrgyzstan) Emirkhan Zholdoshkaziev	000 (yellow card)
(Poland) Jakub Sordyl	100
(Turkey) Münir Ertuğ	000
(Azerbaijan) Kanan Nasibov	101
(Germany) Losseni Kone	001
(United States) Alex Semenenko	000
(Ukraine) Iakiv Khammo	100

Round of 16
(Azerbaijan) Ushangi Kokauri	100
(Poland) Jakub Sordyl	000 (yellow card)
(Azerbaijan) Kanan Nasibov	001 (yellow card)
(Ukraine) Iakiv Khammo	000

Quarter-finals
(Azerbaijan) Ushangi Kokauri	100
(Azerbaijan) Kanan Nasibov	000

== Prize money ==
The sums listed bring the total prizes awarded to €57,000 for the individual event.

Medal	Total	Judoka	Coach
Gold	€26,000	€20,800	€5,200
Silver	€15,000	€12,000	€3,000
Bronze	€8,000	€6,400	€1,600
