= 2025 World Judo Championships – Men's +100 kg =

Judo competition

Judo Men's +100 kg at the 2025 World Judo Championships
- Venue: László Papp Budapest Sports Arena
- Location: Budapest, Hungary
- Date: 19 June 2025
- Competitors: 33 from 27 nations
- Total prize money: €57,000

Medalists
gold medal	Inal Tasoev (2nd title)
silver medal	Guram Tushishvili	Georgia
bronze medal	Temur Rakhimov	Tajikistan
bronze medal	Kim Min-jong	South Korea

Competition at external databases
- Links: IJF • JudoInside

The 2025 World Judo Championships was held at the László Papp Budapest Sports Arena in Budapest, Hungary on 19 June 2025.

== Results ==
=== Finals ===
Semi-finals
(South Korea) Kim Min-jong	000
(Georgia (country)) Guram Tushishvili	100
(Tajikistan) Temur Rakhimov	000
(International Judo Federation) Inal Tasoev	010 (yellow card)

Final
(Georgia (country)) Guram Tushishvili	001 (yellow card)
(International Judo Federation) Inal Tasoev	010

=== Repechage ===
Repechage
(Czech Republic) Lukáš Krpálek	000
(Azerbaijan) Ushangi Kokauri	101
(Mongolia) Batkhuyagiin Gonchigsüren	000
(International Judo Federation) Tamerlan Bashaev	100

Bronze medal
(Azerbaijan) Ushangi Kokauri	010 (yellow card)
(Tajikistan) Temur Rakhimov	100 (yellow card)
(International Judo Federation) Tamerlan Bashaev	000
(South Korea) Kim Min-jong	010 (yellow card)

=== Pool A ===
First round

Round of 32
(South Korea) Kim Min-jong	100 (yellow card)
(Kazakhstan) Yerassyl Kazhibayev	000 (yellow card)
(Finland) Martti Puumalainen	100 (yellow card)
(China) Li Ruixuan	000
(Czech Republic) Lukáš Krpálek	100
(Belgium) Yves Ndao	000
(Senegal) Mbagnick Ndiaye	000 (yellow card)
(Uzbekistan) Alisher Yusupov	101 (yellow card)

Round of 16
(South Korea) Kim Min-jong	100
(Finland) Martti Puumalainen	000
(Czech Republic) Lukáš Krpálek	100
(Uzbekistan) Alisher Yusupov	002

Quarter-finals
(South Korea) Kim Min-jong	001 (yellow card)
(Czech Republic) Lukáš Krpálek	000 (yellow card)

=== Pool B ===
First round
(Azerbaijan) Ushangi Kokauri	100 (yellow card)
(Serbia) Igor Vračar	000

Round of 32
(Georgia (country)) Guram Tushishvili	020 (yellow card)
(Slovakia) Márius Fízeľ	000
(Guinea) Moustapha Fofana	000 (yellow card)
(Germany) Losseni Kone	020 (yellow card)
(Cuba) Andy Granda	000
(Azerbaijan) Ushangi Kokauri	020
(Turkey) Münir Ertuğ	010
(Poland) Grzegorz Teresiński	000 (yellow card)

Round of 16
(Georgia (country)) Guram Tushishvili	100
(Germany) Losseni Kone	000
(Azerbaijan) Ushangi Kokauri	110
(Turkey) Münir Ertuğ	000

Quarter-finals
(Georgia (country)) Guram Tushishvili	100
(Azerbaijan) Ushangi Kokauri	000 (yellow card)

=== Pool C ===
First round

Round of 32
(Tajikistan) Temur Rakhimov	100
(South Korea) Lee Seung-yeob	000
(Austria) Movli Borchashvilli	101
(Germany) Erik Abramov	010
(Japan) Hyōga Ōta	110
(Chile) Francisco Solis	000
(Egypt) Mohamed Aborakia	000
(Mongolia) Batkhuyagiin Gonchigsüren	102 (yellow card)

Round of 16
(Tajikistan) Temur Rakhimov	111
(Austria) Movli Borchashvilli	000
(Japan) Hyōga Ōta	000
(Mongolia) Batkhuyagiin Gonchigsüren	100 (yellow card)

Quarter-finals
(Tajikistan) Temur Rakhimov	021 (yellow card)
(Mongolia) Batkhuyagiin Gonchigsüren	011 (yellow card)

=== Pool D ===
First round

Round of 32
(International Judo Federation) Inal Tasoev	001
(Turkey) Recep Ergin	000 (yellow card)
(Uzbekistan) Muzaffarbek Turoboyev	021
(Netherlands) Jur Spijkers	001
(International Judo Federation) Tamerlan Bashaev	020
(Brazil) Rafael Buzacarini	010
(Cuba) Jonathan Loynaz	000
(Cyprus) Giannis Antoniou	101

Round of 16
(International Judo Federation) Inal Tasoev	020
(Uzbekistan) Muzaffarbek Turoboyev	000 (yellow card)
(International Judo Federation) Tamerlan Bashaev	101
(Cyprus) Giannis Antoniou	000

Quarter-finals
(International Judo Federation) Inal Tasoev	001 (yellow card)
(International Judo Federation) Tamerlan Bashaev	000

== Prize money ==
The sums listed bring the total prizes awarded to €57,000 for the individual event.

Medal	Total	Judoka	Coach
Gold	€26,000	€20,800	€5,200
Silver	€15,000	€12,000	€3,000
Bronze	€8,000	€6,400	€1,600
