= 2018 World Judo Championships – Men's +100 kg =

Judo competition

Judo Men's +100 kg at the 2018 World Judo Championships
- Venue: National Gymnastics Arena
- Location: Baku, Azerbaijan
- Dates: 26 September
- Competitors: 41 from 34 nations
- Total prize money: 57,000€

Medalists
gold medal	Guram Tushishvili (1st title)	Georgia
silver medal	Ushangi Kokauri	Azerbaijan
bronze medal	Hisayoshi Harasawa	Japan
bronze medal	Ölziibayaryn Düürenbayar	Mongolia

Competition at external databases
- Links: IJF • JudoInside

The Men's +100 kg competition at the 2018 World Judo Championships was held on 26 September 2018.

== Results ==
=== Finals ===
Semi-finals
(Georgia (country)) Guram Tushishvili	10
(Mongolia) Ölziibayaryn Düürenbayar	00
(Uzbekistan) Bekmurod Oltiboev	00
(Azerbaijan) Ushangi Kokauri	10

Final
(Georgia (country)) Guram Tushishvili	10
(Azerbaijan) Ushangi Kokauri	00

=== Repechage ===
Repechage
(Netherlands) Roy Meyer	00
(Japan) Hisayoshi Harasawa	10

Third place
(Japan) Hisayoshi Harasawa	10
(Uzbekistan) Bekmurod Oltiboev	00

Repechage
(Tajikistan) Temur Rakhimov	00
(Czech Republic) Lukáš Krpálek	10

Third place
(Czech Republic) Lukáš Krpálek	00
(Mongolia) Ölziibayaryn Düürenbayar	01

=== Pool A ===
First round
(Romania) Daniel Natea	10
(Latvia) Raivis Čakstiņš	00
(Argentina) Héctor Campos	00
(Slovenia) Vito Dragič	10

Second round
(Georgia (country)) Guram Tushishvili	10
(Romania) Daniel Natea	00
(Ukraine) Iakiv Khammo	10
(Tajikistan) Shakarmamad Mirmamadov	00
(Netherlands) Roy Meyer	10
(Tunisia) Faicel Jaballah	00
(Slovenia) Vito Dragič	00
(Serbia) Žarko Ćulum	10

Third round
(Georgia (country)) Guram Tushishvili	11
(Ukraine) Iakiv Khammo	00
(Netherlands) Roy Meyer	10
(Serbia) Žarko Ćulum	00

Quarterfinals
(Georgia (country)) Guram Tushishvili	10
(Netherlands) Roy Meyer	00

=== Pool B ===
First round
(Japan) Hisayoshi Harasawa	10
(Spain) Ángel Parra	01
(Venezuela) Pedro Pineda	01
(United States) Ajax Tadehara	00

Second round
(Brazil) Rafael Silva	00
(Japan) Hisayoshi Harasawa	10
(South Korea) Kim Min-jong	01
(Israel) Or Sasson	00
(Mongolia) Ölziibayaryn Düürenbayar	10
(Venezuela) Pedro Pineda	00
(Cuba) Andy Granda	10
(Kyrgyzstan) Iurii Krakovetskii	00

Third round
(Japan) Hisayoshi Harasawa	10
(South Korea) Kim Min-jong	00
(Mongolia) Ölziibayaryn Düürenbayar	10
(Cuba) Andy Granda	00

Quarterfinals
(Japan) Hisayoshi Harasawa	00
(Mongolia) Ölziibayaryn Düürenbayar	10

=== Pool C ===
First round
(Australia) Liam Park	00
(Uzbekistan) Bekmurod Oltiboev	10
(Ecuador) Freddy Figueroa	00
(Tajikistan) Temur Rakhimov	10

Second round
(Brazil) David Moura	00
(Uzbekistan) Bekmurod Oltiboev	10
(Chile) Francisco Solis	00
(Kazakhstan) Yerassyl Kazhybayev	10
(Iran) Javad Mahjoub	00
(Tajikistan) Temur Rakhimov	11
(Bosnia and Herzegovina) Harun Sadiković	00
(Japan) Yusei Ogawa	10

Third round
(Uzbekistan) Bekmurod Oltiboev	10
(Kazakhstan) Yerassyl Kazhybayev	00
(Tajikistan) Temur Rakhimov	10
(Japan) Yusei Ogawa	00

Quarterfinals
(Uzbekistan) Bekmurod Oltiboev	10
(Tajikistan) Temur Rakhimov	00

=== Pool D ===
First round
(Netherlands) Henk Grol	10
(Senegal) Mbagnick Ndiaye	00
(Kyrgyzstan) Bekbolot Toktogonov	00
(Mongolia) Naidangiin Tüvshinbayar	10
(Austria) Daniel Allerstorfer	00
(Ukraine) Oleksandr Gordiienko	10

Second round
(Czech Republic) Lukáš Krpálek	10
(Netherlands) Henk Grol	01
(China) Yuan Shaotong	00
(Mongolia) Naidangiin Tüvshinbayar	10
(Poland) Maciej Sarnacki	11
(Ukraine) Oleksandr Gordiienko	00
(Azerbaijan) Ushangi Kokauri	10
(Belarus) Uladzislau Tsiarpitski	00

Third round
(Czech Republic) Lukáš Krpálek	10
(Mongolia) Naidangiin Tüvshinbayar	00
(Poland) Maciej Sarnacki	00
(Azerbaijan) Ushangi Kokauri	10

Quarterfinals
(Czech Republic) Lukáš Krpálek	01
(Azerbaijan) Ushangi Kokauri	10

== Prize money ==
The sums listed bring the total prizes awarded to 57,000€ for the individual event.

Medal	Total	Judoka	Coach
Gold	26,000€	20,800€	5,200€
Silver	15,000€	12,000€	3,000€
Bronze	8,000€	6,400€	1,600€
