= 2021 European Judo Championships – Men's +100 kg =

Judo Men's +100 kg at the 2021 European Judo Championships
- Venue: Altice Arena
- Location: Lisbon, Portugal
- Date: 18 April
- Competitors: 22 from 18 nations

Medalists
gold medal	Inal Tasoev (1st title)	Russia
silver medal	Henk Grol	Netherlands
bronze medal	Guram Tushishvili	Georgia
bronze medal	Lukáš Krpálek	Czech Republic

Competition at external databases
- Links: IJF • JudoInside

The men's +100 kg competition at the 2021 European Judo Championships was held on 18 April at the Altice Arena.

== Results ==
=== Final ===
Final
Henk Grol (NED)	00
Inal Tasoev (RUS)	10

=== Repechage ===
Repechage
Levani Matiashvili (GEO)	00
Roy Meyer (NED)	10

Third place
Roy Meyer (NED)	00
Guram Tushishvili (GEO)	10

Repechage
Daniel Allerstorfer (AUT)	00
Or Sasson (ISR)	10

Third place
Or Sasson (ISR)	01
Lukáš Krpálek (CZE)	10

=== Top half ===
Round of 32
Aliaksandr Vakhaviak (BLR)	10
Márius Fízeľ (SVK)	00
Vito Dragič (SLO)	00
Oleksandr Gordiienko (UKR)	11
Jonas Schreiber (GER)	10
Vasco Rompão (POR)	00

Round of 16
Lukáš Krpálek (CZE)	10
Aliaksandr Vakhaviak (BLR)	00
Levani Matiashvili (GEO)	10
Oleksandr Gordiienko (UKR)	00
Henk Grol (NED)	10
Jonas Schreiber (GER)	00
Roy Meyer (NED)	10
Luca Kunszabo (ROU)	00

Quarterfinals
Lukáš Krpálek (CZE)	10
Levani Matiashvili (GEO)	00
Henk Grol (NED)	10
Roy Meyer (NED)	00

Semifinals
Lukáš Krpálek (CZE)	00
Henk Grol (NED)	10

=== Bottom half ===
Round of 32
Daniel Allerstorfer (AUT)	10
Ivan Čović (CRO)	00
Vlăduț Simionescu (ROU)	01
Cemal Erdoğan (TUR)	10
Martti Puumalainen (FIN)	00
Enej Marinič (SLO)	10

Round of 16
Inal Tasoev (RUS)	10
Irinel Chelaru (ESP)	00
Ushangi Kokauri (AZE)	00
Daniel Allerstorfer (AUT)	10
Guram Tushishvili (GEO)	10
Cemal Erdoğan (TUR)	00
Or Sasson (ISR)	10
Enej Marinič (SLO)	00

Quarterfinals
Inal Tasoev (RUS)	11
Daniel Allerstorfer (AUT)	00
Guram Tushishvili (GEO)	10
Or Sasson (ISR)	00

Semifinals
Inal Tasoev (RUS)	10
Guram Tushishvili (GEO)	00
