= 2024 European Judo Championships – Men's +100 kg =

Judo competition

Judo Men's +100 kg at the 2024 European Judo Championships
- Venue: Arena Zagreb
- Location: Zagreb, Croatia
- Date: 27 April
- Competitors: 27 from 19 nations

Medalists
gold medal	Inal Tasoev (2nd title)
silver medal	Guram Tushishvili	Georgia
bronze medal	Tamerlan Bashaev
bronze medal	Márius Fízeľ	Slovakia

Competition at external databases
- Links: IJF • JudoInside

The Men's +100 kg event at the 2024 European Judo Championships was held at the Arena Zagreb in Zagreb, Croatia on 27 April 2024.

== Results ==
=== Finals ===
Semi-finals
Inal Tasoev	01 (yellow card)
(Slovakia) Márius Fízeľ	00 (yellow card)
(Georgia (country)) Guram Tushishvili	01 (yellow card)
Tamerlan Bashaev	00 (yellow card)

Final
Inal Tasoev	10
(Georgia (country)) Guram Tushishvili	00

=== Repechage ===
Repechage
(Netherlands) Jur Spijkers	02 (yellow card)
(Netherlands) Jelle Snippe	00
(Germany) Losseni Kone	00
(Germany) Erik Abramov	01

Bronze medal
(Netherlands) Jur Spijkers	00 (yellow card)
Tamerlan Bashaev	02
(Germany) Erik Abramov	00
(Slovakia) Márius Fízeľ	10

=== Pool A ===
First round
(Turkey) Münir Ertuğ	02
(Israel) Evgeny Shmachilin	00 (yellow card)
(Netherlands) Jur Spijkers	11
(Georgia (country)) Saba Inaneishvili	00 (yellow card)
(Slovenia) Enej Marinič	02 (yellow card)
(Serbia) Igor Vračar	00 (yellow card)

Round of 16
Inal Tasoev	10 (yellow card)
(Turkey) Münir Ertuğ	00
(Netherlands) Jur Spijkers	10
(Slovenia) Enej Marinič	00 (yellow card)

Quarter-finals
Inal Tasoev	02
(Netherlands) Jur Spijkers	00 (yellow card)

=== Pool B ===
First round
(Iceland) Karl Stefánsson	00 (yellow card)
(France) Khamzat Saparbaev	10
(Poland) Grzegorz Teresiński	01
(Romania) Vlăduț Simionescu	02 (yellow card)

Round of 16
(Netherlands) Jelle Snippe	01
(France) Khamzat Saparbaev	00 (yellow card)
(Slovakia) Márius Fízeľ	10 (yellow card)
(Romania) Vlăduț Simionescu	00 (yellow card)

Quarter-finals
(Netherlands) Jelle Snippe	00 (yellow card)
(Slovakia) Márius Fízeľ	11

=== Pool C ===
First round
(Poland) Kacper Szczurowski	10
(Austria) Movli Borchashvilli	00 (yellow card)
(Germany) Losseni Kone	10 (yellow card)
(Estonia) Karl Priilinn-Türk	00
(Cyprus) Giannis Antoniou	02
(France) Mathéo Akiana Mongo	00

Round of 16
(Georgia (country)) Guram Tushishvili	10
(Poland) Kacper Szczurowski	00
(Germany) Losseni Kone	01
(Cyprus) Giannis Antoniou	00 (yellow card)

Quarter-finals
(Georgia (country)) Guram Tushishvili	10
(Germany) Losseni Kone	00 (yellow card)

=== Pool D ===
First round
(Turkey) İbrahim Tataroğlu	11
(Italy) Kwadjo Anani	00
(Germany) Erik Abramov	10
(Slovenia) Vito Dragič	00
(Montenegro) Anto Dubreta	00 (yellow card)
(Monaco) Marvin Gadeau	01 (yellow card)

Round of 16
Tamerlan Bashaev	10
(Turkey) İbrahim Tataroğlu	00
(Germany) Erik Abramov	10
(Monaco) Marvin Gadeau	00 (yellow card)

Quarter-finals
Tamerlan Bashaev	10
(Germany) Erik Abramov	00
