= 2023 European Judo Championships – Men's +100 kg =

Judo competition

Judo Men's +100 kg at the 2023 European Judo Championships
- Venue: Sud de France Arena
- Location: Montpellier, France
- Date: 5 November 2023
- Competitors: 25 from 21 nations

Medalists
gold medal	Martti Puumalainen (1st title)	Finland
silver medal	Guram Tushishvili	Georgia
bronze medal	Valeriy Endovitskiy
bronze medal	Jelle Snippe	Netherlands

Competition at external databases
- Links: IJF • JudoInside

The Men's +100 kg event at the 2023 European Judo Championships was held at the Sud de France Arena in Montpellier, France on 5 November 2023.

== Results ==
=== Finals ===
Semi-finals
(Finland) Martti Puumalainen	02 (yellow card)
(Netherlands) Jelle Snippe	00 (yellow card)
(Hungary) Richárd Sipőcz	00 (yellow card)
(Georgia (country)) Guram Tushishvili	02 (yellow card)

Final
(Finland) Martti Puumalainen	02
(Georgia (country)) Guram Tushishvili	01 (yellow card)

=== Repechage ===
Repechage
Valeriy Endovitskiy	10
(Netherlands) Roy Meyer	00
(Slovakia) Márius Fízeľ	02 (yellow card)
(Turkey) Münir Ertuğ	01

Bronze medal
Valeriy Endovitskiy	10 (yellow card)
(Hungary) Richárd Sipőcz	00
(Slovakia) Márius Fízeľ	00
(Netherlands) Jelle Snippe	10

=== Pool A ===
First round
(Cyprus) Giannis Antoniou	00
(Serbia) Igor Vračar	02 (yellow card)
(Germany) Losseni Kone	02
(Austria) Movli Borchashvilli	00
Valeriy Endovitskiy	01
(Slovenia) Vito Dragič	00 (yellow card)

Round of 16
(Finland) Martti Puumalainen	02
(Serbia) Igor Vračar	00
(Germany) Losseni Kone	00 (yellow card)
Valeriy Endovitskiy	01 (yellow card)

Quarter-finals
(Finland) Martti Puumalainen	02
Valeriy Endovitskiy	00

=== Pool B ===
First round
(Poland) Kacper Szczurowski	00
(Turkey) İbrahim Tataroğlu	10 (yellow card)
(Iceland) Karl Stefánsson	00
(Ukraine) Yevheniy Balyevskyy	10

Round of 16
(Netherlands) Jelle Snippe	02
(Turkey) İbrahim Tataroğlu	01
(Netherlands) Roy Meyer	01
(Ukraine) Yevheniy Balyevskyy	00

Quarter-finals
(Netherlands) Jelle Snippe	10
(Netherlands) Roy Meyer	00

=== Pool C ===
First round
(Romania) Mircea Croitoru	00
(Slovakia) Márius Fízeľ	11
(Monaco) Marvin Gadeau	00
(Slovenia) Enej Marinič	10

Round of 16
(Azerbaijan) Ushangi Kokauri	01 (yellow card)
(Slovakia) Márius Fízeľ	02
(Hungary) Richárd Sipőcz	01 (yellow card)
(Slovenia) Enej Marinič	00

Quarter-finals
(Slovakia) Márius Fízeľ	00
(Hungary) Richárd Sipőcz	01

=== Pool D ===
First round
(United Kingdom) Wesley Greenidge	00
(Germany) Erik Abramov	10
(Turkey) Münir Ertuğ	10
(Montenegro) Anto Dubreta	00

Round of 16
(Georgia (country)) Guram Tushishvili	11
(Germany) Erik Abramov	00
(Czech Republic) Lukáš Krpálek	00
(Turkey) Münir Ertuğ	10

Quarter-finals
(Georgia (country)) Guram Tushishvili	10
(Turkey) Münir Ertuğ	00
