= Judo at the 2024 Summer Olympics – Men's +100 kg =

Judo Men's +100 kg at the Games of the XXXIII Olympiad
- Venue: Grand Palais Éphémère
- Location: Paris, France
- Date: 2 August 2024
- Competitors: 23 from 23 nations
- Website: Official website

Medalists
| gold medal | Teddy Riner (3rd title) | France |
| silver medal | Kim Min-jong | South Korea |
| bronze medal | Temur Rakhimov | Tajikistan |
| bronze medal | Alisher Yusupov | Uzbekistan |

Competition at external databases
- Links: IJF • JudoInside

The Men's +100 kg event in Judo at the 2024 Summer Olympics was held at the Grand Palais Éphémère in Paris, France on 2 August 2024.

== Summary ==
This is the fifteenth appearance of the men's heavyweight category, it has appeared in every edition except 1968.

Defending champion Lukáš Krpálek lost to Tatsuru Saito in round of 16, 2020 silver medalist Guram Tushishvili lost to eventual champion Teddy Riner to defend his title for the third time, later, Tushishvili got into repechages, he was disqualified, potentially bronze medalist Alisher Yusupov won over a repechage, Tamerlan Bashaev failed to qualify due to IOC barred the Russian Olympic Committee (ROC) due to Russian invasion of Ukraine.

== Results ==
=== Finals ===
Semi-finals
Kim Min-jong (KOR) | 10
Tatsuru Saito (JPN) | 00
Temur Rakhimov (TJK) | 00
Teddy Riner (FRA) | 10 (yellow card)

Final
Kim Min-jong (KOR) | 00 (yellow card)
Teddy Riner (FRA) | 10 (yellow card)

=== Repechage ===
Repechage
Ushangi Kokauri (AZE) | 00
Andy Granda (CUB) | 10 (yellow card)
Alisher Yusupov (UZB) | w/o
~~Guram Tushishvili (GEO)~~ | DSQ

Bronze medal
Andy Granda (CUB) | 00 (yellow card)
Temur Rakhimov (TJK) | 01
Alisher Yusupov (UZB) | 11
Tatsuru Saito (JPN) | 00 (yellow card)

=== Pool A ===
First round
İbrahim Tataroğlu (TUR) | 11
Enej Marinič (SLO) | 00 (yellow card)
Ushangi Kokauri (AZE) | 10
Rafael Silva (BRA) | 00

Round of 16
Kim Min-jong (KOR) | 11
İbrahim Tataroğlu (TUR) | 00
Martti Puumalainen (FIN) | 00 (yellow card)
Ushangi Kokauri (AZE) | 10

Quarter-finals
Kim Min-jong (KOR) | 01 (yellow card)
Ushangi Kokauri (AZE) | 00 (yellow card)

=== Pool B ===
First round
Lukáš Krpálek (CZE) | 10
Jelle Snippe (NED) | 00

Round of 16
Andy Granda (CUB) | 10
Marvin Gadeau (MON) | 00 (yellow card)
Tatsuru Saito (JPN) | 10
Lukáš Krpálek (CZE) | 00

Quarter-finals
Andy Granda (CUB) | 00
Tatsuru Saito (JPN) | 01 (yellow card)

=== Pool C ===
First round
Erik Abramov (GER) | 01
Odkhüügiin Tsetsentsengel (MGL) | 00
Gerard Takayawa (FIJ) | 00 (yellow card)
Márius Fízeľ (SVK) | 10 (yellow card)

Round of 16
Temur Rakhimov (TJK) | 10
Erik Abramov (GER) | 01
Alisher Yusupov (UZB) | 10
Márius Fízeľ (SVK) | 00

Quarter-finals
Temur Rakhimov (TJK) | 11 (yellow card)
Alisher Yusupov (UZB) | 01

=== Pool D ===
First round
Mbagnick Ndiaye (SEN) | 10
Bubacar Mane (GBS) | 00
Magomedomar Magomedomarov (UAE) | 10
Mohamed El Mehdi Lili (ALG) | 00

Round of 16
Guram Tushishvili (GEO) | 10
Mbagnick Ndiaye (SEN) | 00
Teddy Riner (FRA) | 10 (yellow card)
Magomedomar Magomedomarov (UAE) | 00

Quarter-finals
~~Guram Tushishvili (GEO)~~ | 00
Teddy Riner (FRA) | 10 (yellow card)

== Weigh-in list ==
Weights in table are listed in kg.

| Result | Judoka | Weight |
|---|---|---|
| 1st place, gold medalist(s) | Teddy Riner (FRA) | 141.5 |
| 2nd place, silver medalist(s) | Kim Min-jong (KOR) | 133.8 |
| 3rd place, bronze medalist(s) | Temur Rakhimov (TJK) | 122.5 |
| 3rd place, bronze medalist(s) | Alisher Yusupov (UZB) | 125.6 |
| 5 | Andy Granda (CUB) | 120.1 |
| 5 | Tatsuru Saito (JPN) | 172.0 |
| 7 | Ushangi Kokauri (AZE) | 142.8 |
| 7 | Guram Tushishvili (GEO) | 117.4 |
| 9 | İbrahim Tataroğlu (TUR) | 160.0 |
| 9 | Martti Puumalainen (FIN) | 131.8 |
| 9 | Marvin Gadeau (MON) | 154.0 |
| 9 | Lukáš Krpálek (CZE) | 113.5 |
| 9 | Erik Abramov (GER) | 118.4 |
| 9 | Márius Fízeľ (SVK) | 118.7 |
| 9 | Mbagnick Ndiaye (SEN) | 149.7 |
| 9 | Magomedomar Magomedomarov (UAE) | 130.3 |
| 17 | Enej Marinič (SLO) | 136.1 |
| 17 | Rafael Silva (BRA) | 172.8 |
| 17 | Jelle Snippe (NED) | 113.7 |
| 17 | Odkhüügiin Tsetsentsengel (MGL) | 122.4 |
| 17 | Gerard Takayawa (FIJ) | 125.9 |
| 17 | Bubacar Mane (GBS) | 140.8 |
| 17 | Mohamed El Mehdi Lili (ALG) | 137.6 |
