= Judo at the 2019 European Games – Men's +100 kg =

Judo competition

Judo Men's +100 kg at the 2019 European Games
- Venue: Čyžoŭka-Arena
- Location: Minsk, Belarus
- Date: 24 June
- Competitors: 23 from 17 nations

Medalists
gold medal	Guram Tushishvili (2nd title)	Georgia
silver medal	Inal Tasoev	Russia
bronze medal	Stephan Hegyi	Austria
bronze medal	Henk Grol	Netherlands

Competition at external databases
- Links: IJF • JudoInside

The men's +100 kg judo event at the 2019 European Games in Minsk was held on 24 June at the Čyžoŭka-Arena.

== Results ==
=== Final ===
Final
Guram Tushishvili (GEO)	10
Inal Tasoev (RUS)	01

=== Repechage ===
Repechage
Maciej Sarnacki (POL)	00
Stephan Hegyi (AUT)	11

Third place
Stephan Hegyi (AUT)	10
Ushangi Kokauri (AZE)	00

Repechage
Lukáš Krpálek (CZE)	10
Roy Meyer (NED)	00

Third place
Lukáš Krpálek (CZE)	00
Henk Grol (NED)	11

=== Top half ===
Round of 32
Irinel Chelaru (ESP)	00
Iakiv Khammo (UKR)	10
Aliaksandr Vakhaviak (BLR)	00
Sven Heinle (GER)	10
Dimitrios Tsoumitas (GRE)	00
Žarko Ćulum (SRB)	10

Round of 16
Guram Tushishvili (GEO)	10
Vlăduț Simionescu (ROU)	01
Maciej Sarnacki (POL)	10
Iakiv Khammo (UKR)	00
Stephan Hegyi (AUT)	10
Sven Heinle (GER)	00
Henk Grol (NED)	10
Žarko Ćulum (SRB)	00

Quarterfinals
Guram Tushishvili (GEO)	10
Maciej Sarnacki (POL)	00
Stephan Hegyi (AUT)	00
Henk Grol (NED)	10

Semifinals
Guram Tushishvili (GEO)	10
Henk Grol (NED)	01

=== Bottom half ===
Round of 32
Mircea Croitoru (ROU)	00
Andrii Koleśnyk (UKR)	10
Uladzislau Tsiarpitski (BLR)	11
Harun Sadiković (BIH)	00
Daniel Allerstorfer (AUT)	10
Johannes Frey (GER)	00
Vincenzo D'Arco (ITA)	00
Vito Dragič (SLO)	11

Round of 16
Lukáš Krpálek (CZE)	11
Andrii Koleśnyk (UKR)	00
Inal Tasoev (RUS)	11
Uladzislau Tsiarpitski (BLR)	00
Roy Meyer (NED)	10
Daniel Allerstorfer (AUT)	00
Ushangi Kokauri (AZE)	10
Vito Dragič (SLO)	00

Quarterfinals
Lukáš Krpálek (CZE)	00
Inal Tasoev (RUS)	01
Roy Meyer (NED)	00
Ushangi Kokauri (AZE)	10

Semifinals
Inal Tasoev (RUS)	11
Ushangi Kokauri (AZE)	00
