= 2022 European Judo Championships – Men's +100 kg =

Judo Men's +100 kg at the 2022 European Judo Championships
- Venue: Armeets Arena
- Location: Sofia, Bulgaria
- Date: 1 May
- Competitors: 17 from 15 nations

Medalists
gold medal	Jur Spijkers (1st title)	Netherlands
silver medal	Johannes Frey	Germany
bronze medal	Roy Meyer	Netherlands
bronze medal	Guram Tushishvili	Georgia

Competition at external databases
- Links: IJF • JudoInside

The men's +100 kg competition at the 2022 European Judo Championships was held on 1 May at the Armeets Arena.

== Results ==
=== Finals ===
Semi-finals
Guram Tushishvili (GEO)	00
Jur Spijkers (NED)	10
Johannes Frey (GER)	11
Richárd Sipőcz (HUN)	00

Final
Jur Spijkers (NED)	10
Johannes Frey (GER)	00

=== Repechage ===
Repechage
Roy Meyer (NED)	10
Daniel Allerstorfer (AUT)	00
Ushangi Kokauri (AZE)	00
Iakiv Khammo (UKR)	10

Bronze medal
Roy Meyer (NED)	01
Richárd Sipőcz (HUN)	00
Iakiv Khammo (UKR)	00
Guram Tushishvili (GEO)	10

=== Pool A ===
First round
Márius Fízeľ (SVK)	01
Irinel Chelaru (ESP)	00

Round of 16
Guram Tushishvili (GEO)	01
Losseni Kone (GER)	00
Roy Meyer (NED)	10
Márius Fízeľ (SVK)	00

Quarterfinals
Guram Tushishvili (GEO)	10
Roy Meyer (NED)	00

=== Pool B ===
First round

Round of 16
Jur Spijkers (NED)	10
Ivaylo Dimitrov (BUL)	00
Vlăduț Simionescu (ROU)	00
Daniel Allerstorfer (AUT)	10

Quarterfinals
Jur Spijkers (NED)	10
Daniel Allerstorfer (AUT)	00

=== Pool C ===
First round

Round of 16
Ushangi Kokauri (AZE)	10
Yves Ndao (BEL)	00
Joseph Terhec (FRA)	00
Johannes Frey (GER)	10

Quarterfinals
Ushangi Kokauri (AZE)	00
Johannes Frey (GER)	10

=== Pool D ===
First round

Round of 16
Iakiv Khammo (UKR)	10
Münir Ertuğ (TUR)	00
Richárd Sipőcz (HUN)	10
Vito Dragič (SLO)	00

Quarterfinals
Iakiv Khammo (UKR)	00
Richárd Sipőcz (HUN)	10
