= Judo at the 2022 Asian Games – Men's +100 kg =

Judo competition

Judo Men's +100 kg at the 2022 Asian Games
- Venue: Xiaoshan Linpu Gymnasium
- Location: Hangzhou, China
- Date: 26 September 2023

Medalists
gold medal	Magomedomar Magomedomarov; United Arab Emirates
silver medal	Temur Rakhimov; Tajikistan
bronze medal	Alisher Yusupov; Uzbekistan
bronze medal	Kim Min-jong; South Korea

Competition at external databases
- Links: IJF • JudoInside

The men's +100 kilograms (heavyweight) competition in Judo at the 2022 Asian Games in Hangzhou was held on 26 September 2023 at the Xiaoshan Linpu Gymnasium.

In the final, Magomedomar Magomedomarov from United Arab Emirates won the gold medal.

== Schedule ==
All times are China Standard Time (UTC+08:00)

Date	Time	Event
Tuesday, 26 September 2023	10:00	Elimination round of 16
Tuesday, 26 September 2023	10:00	Quarterfinals
Tuesday, 26 September 2023	10:00	Repechage
Tuesday, 26 September 2023	10:00	Semifinals
Tuesday, 26 September 2023	16:00	Finals

== Results ==
=== Main bracket ===
Round of 16
Azamat Chotchaev (BHR)	00
Li Ruixuan (CHN)	11
Hyōga Ōta (JPN)	10
I Gede Agastya Darma Wardana (INA)	00
Galymzhan Krikbay (KAZ)	10 (yellow card)
Ranjesh Gole (NEP)	00 (yellow card)
Magomedomar Magomedomarov (UAE)	10 (yellow card)
Syimyk Zhaparov (KGZ)	00

Quarter-finals
Temur Rakhimov (TJK)	10
Li Ruixuan (CHN)	00
Kim Min-jong (KOR)	10 (yellow card)
Hyōga Ōta (JPN)	00
Alisher Yusupov (UZB)	10
Galymzhan Krikbay (KAZ)	00
Odkhüügiin Tsetsentsengel (MGL)	00
Magomedomar Magomedomarov (UAE)	01

Semi-finals
Temur Rakhimov (TJK)	01
Kim Min-jong (KOR)	00
Alisher Yusupov (UZB)	01
Magomedomar Magomedomarov (UAE)	10 (yellow card)

Gold medal contest
Temur Rakhimov (TJK)	00
Magomedomar Magomedomarov (UAE)	10 (yellow card)

=== Repechage ===
Repechage
Li Ruixuan (CHN)	00
Hyōga Ōta (JPN)	10
Galymzhan Krikbay (KAZ)	10
Odkhüügiin Tsetsentsengel (MGL)	00

Bronze medal contests
Hyōga Ōta (JPN)	00
Alisher Yusupov (UZB)	10
Galymzhan Krikbay (KAZ)	00
Kim Min-jong (KOR)	01
