= 2026 European Judo Championships – Men's +100 kg =

Judo competition

Judo Men's +100 kg at the 2026 European Judo Championships
- Venue: Olympic Palace
- Location: Tbilisi, Georgia
- Date: 19 April 2026
- Competitors: 25 from 19 nations

Medalists
gold medal	Guram Tushishvili (3rd title)	Georgia
silver medal	Lukáš Krpálek	Czech Republic
bronze medal	Valeriy Endovitskiy	Russia
bronze medal	İbrahim Tataroğlu	Turkey

Competition at external databases
- Links: IJF

The men's +100 kg event at the 2026 European Judo Championships was held at the Olympic Palace in Tbilisi, Georgia on 19 April 2026.

== Results ==
=== Finals ===
Semi-finals
(Poland) Grzegorz Teresiński	000 (yellow card)
(Czech Republic) Lukáš Krpálek	100
(Georgia (country)) Guram Tushishvili	100
(Russia) Valeriy Endovitskiy	000

Final
(Czech Republic) Lukáš Krpálek	000
(Georgia (country)) Guram Tushishvili	010

=== Repechage ===
Repechage
(Estonia) Karl Priilinn-Türk	000
(Romania) Darius Dobre	021
(Turkey) İbrahim Tataroğlu	020
(Germany) Erik Abramov	001

Bronze medal
(Romania) Darius Dobre	000
(Russia) Valeriy Endovitskiy	100
(Turkey) İbrahim Tataroğlu	110 (yellow card)
(Poland) Grzegorz Teresiński	000

=== Pool A ===
First round
(Estonia) Karl Priilinn-Türk	011 (yellow card)
(Portugal) Diogo Brites	000
(Poland) Grzegorz Teresiński	100
(Montenegro) Stefan Kovinić	000

Round of 16
(Netherlands) Jur Spijkers	001 (yellow card)
(Estonia) Karl Priilinn-Türk	002
(Ukraine) Yevheniy Balyevskyy	000 (yellow card)
(Poland) Grzegorz Teresiński	020 (yellow card)

Quarter-finals
(Estonia) Karl Priilinn-Türk	000 (yellow card)
(Poland) Grzegorz Teresiński	002

=== Pool B ===
First round
(Germany) Losseni Kone	100
(Turkey) Münir Ertuğ	000
(Romania) Darius Dobre	100 (yellow card)
(Serbia) Igor Vračar	000

Round of 16
(Czech Republic) Lukáš Krpálek	100 (yellow card)
(Germany) Losseni Kone	000 (yellow card)
(Russia) ~~Tamerlan Bashaev~~
(Romania) Darius Dobre	w/o

Quarter-finals
(Czech Republic) Lukáš Krpálek	100
(Romania) Darius Dobre	000

=== Pool C ===
First round
(Cyprus) Giannis Antoniou	100
(Ukraine) Iakiv Khammo	000
(Estonia) Marek-Adrian Mäsak	000
(Austria) Movli Borchashvilli	020 (yellow card)

Round of 16
(Georgia (country)) Guram Tushishvili	100
(Cyprus) Giannis Antoniou	001
(Turkey) İbrahim Tataroğlu	020
(Austria) Movli Borchashvilli	000

Quarter-finals
(Georgia (country)) Guram Tushishvili	100
(Turkey) İbrahim Tataroğlu	000 (yellow card)

=== Pool D ===
First round
(France) Mathéo Akiana Mongo	000
(Germany) Erik Abramov	100
(Croatia) Mikita Sviryd	001 (yellow card)
(Poland) Jakub Sordyl	000 (yellow card)

Round of 16
(Azerbaijan) Kanan Nasibov	000
(Germany) Erik Abramov	110
(Russia) Valeriy Endovitskiy	100 (yellow card)
(Croatia) Mikita Sviryd	000

Quarter-finals
(Germany) Erik Abramov	002
(Russia) Valeriy Endovitskiy	100
