= 2023 Judo Grand Slam Tashkent =

Judo competition

Judo 2023 Judo Grand Slam Tashkent
- Venue: Yunusobod Sport Complex
- Location: Tashkent, Uzbekistan
- Dates: 3–5 March 2023
- Total prize money: €154,000

Competition at external databases
- Links: IJF • JudoInside

The 2023 Judo Grand Slam Tashkent was held at the Yunusobod Sport Complex in Tashkent, Uzbekistan from 3 to 5 March 2023 as part of the IJF World Tour and during the 2024 Summer Olympics qualification period.

== Medal summary ==
=== Men's events ===
Event	Gold	Silver	Bronze
Extra-lightweight (−60 kg)	Kim Won-jin (KOR)	Nurkanat Serikbayev (KAZ)	Ahmad Yusifov (AZE)
Extra-lightweight (−60 kg)	Kim Won-jin (KOR)	Nurkanat Serikbayev (KAZ)	Doston Ruziev (UZB)
Half-lightweight (−66 kg)	Nurali Emomali (TJK)	Sardor Nurillaev (UZB)	Walide Khyar (FRA)
Half-lightweight (−66 kg)	Nurali Emomali (TJK)	Sardor Nurillaev (UZB)	Mukhriddin Tilovov (UZB)
Lightweight (−73 kg)	Murodjon Yuldoshev (UZB)	Daniyar Shamshayev (KAZ)	Nils Stump (SUI)
Lightweight (−73 kg)	Murodjon Yuldoshev (UZB)	Daniyar Shamshayev (KAZ)	Magdiel Estrada (CUB)
Half-middleweight (−81 kg)	Attila Ungvári (HUN)	Shamil Borchashvili (AUT)	Somon Makhmadbekov (TJK)
Half-middleweight (−81 kg)	Attila Ungvári (HUN)	Shamil Borchashvili (AUT)	Muso Sobirov (UZB)
Middleweight (−90 kg)	Davlat Bobonov (UZB)	Sanshiro Murao (JPN)	Giovani Ferreira (BRA)
Middleweight (−90 kg)	Davlat Bobonov (UZB)	Sanshiro Murao (JPN)	Krisztián Tóth (HUN)
Half-heavyweight (−100 kg)	Varlam Liparteliani (GEO)	Aaron Fara (AUT)	Kotaro Ueoka (JPN)
Half-heavyweight (−100 kg)	Varlam Liparteliani (GEO)	Aaron Fara (AUT)	Dzhafar Kostoev (UAE)
Heavyweight (+100 kg)	Alisher Yusupov (UZB)	Tatsuru Saito (JPN)	Andy Granda (CUB)
Heavyweight (+100 kg)	Alisher Yusupov (UZB)	Tatsuru Saito (JPN)	Gela Zaalishvili (GEO)

=== Women's events ===
Event	Gold	Silver	Bronze
Extra-lightweight (−48 kg)	Andrea Stojadinov (SRB)	Catarina Costa (POR)	Tuğçe Beder (TUR)
Extra-lightweight (−48 kg)	Andrea Stojadinov (SRB)	Catarina Costa (POR)	Guo Zongying (CHN)
Half-lightweight (−52 kg)	Mascha Ballhaus (GER)	Ai Shishime (JPN)	Ana Pérez Box (ESP)
Half-lightweight (−52 kg)	Mascha Ballhaus (GER)	Ai Shishime (JPN)	Réka Pupp (HUN)
Lightweight (−57 kg)	Momo Tamaoki (JPN)	Eteri Liparteliani (GEO)	Akari Omori (JPN)
Lightweight (−57 kg)	Momo Tamaoki (JPN)	Eteri Liparteliani (GEO)	Pauline Starke (GER)
Half-middleweight (−63 kg)	Megumi Horikawa (JPN)	Prisca Awiti Alcaraz (MEX)	Florentina Ivănescu (ROU)
Half-middleweight (−63 kg)	Megumi Horikawa (JPN)	Prisca Awiti Alcaraz (MEX)	Szofi Özbas (HUN)
Middleweight (−70 kg)	Michaela Polleres (AUT)	Barbara Matić (CRO)	Gulnoza Matniyazova (UZB)
Middleweight (−70 kg)	Michaela Polleres (AUT)	Barbara Matić (CRO)	Anna Bernholm (SWE)
Half-heavyweight (−78 kg)	Rika Takayama (JPN)	Giorgia Stangherlin (ITA)	Patrícia Sampaio (POR)
Half-heavyweight (−78 kg)	Rika Takayama (JPN)	Giorgia Stangherlin (ITA)	Ma Zhenzhao (CHN)
Heavyweight (+78 kg)	Wakaba Tomita (JPN)	Xu Shiyan (CHN)	Hilal Öztürk (TUR)
Heavyweight (+78 kg)	Wakaba Tomita (JPN)	Xu Shiyan (CHN)	Su Xin (CHN)

Source results:

=== Medal table ===
* Host nation (Uzbekistan)

Rank	Nation	Gold	Silver	Bronze	Total
1	Japan (JPN)	4	3	2	9
2	Uzbekistan (UZB)*	3	1	4	8
3	Austria (AUT)	1	2	0	3
4	Georgia (GEO)	1	1	1	3
5	Hungary (HUN)	1	0	3	4
6	Germany (GER)	1	0	1	2
6	Tajikistan (TJK)	1	0	1	2
8	Serbia (SRB)	1	0	0	1
8	South Korea (KOR)	1	0	0	1
10	Kazakhstan (KAZ)	0	2	0	2
11	China (CHN)	0	1	3	4
12	Portugal (POR)	0	1	1	2
13	Croatia (CRO)	0	1	0	1
13	Italy (ITA)	0	1	0	1
13	Mexico (MEX)	0	1	0	1
16	Cuba (CUB)	0	0	2	2
16	Turkey (TUR)	0	0	2	2
18	Azerbaijan (AZE)	0	0	1	1
18	Brazil (BRA)	0	0	1	1
18	France (FRA)	0	0	1	1
18	Romania (ROU)	0	0	1	1
18	Spain (ESP)	0	0	1	1
18	Sweden (SWE)	0	0	1	1
18	Switzerland (SUI)	0	0	1	1
18	United Arab Emirates (UAE)	0	0	1	1
Totals (25 entries)		14	14	28	56

== Prize money ==
The sums written are per medalist, bringing the total prizes awarded to €154,000. (retrieved from:)

Medal	Total	Judoka	Coach
Gold	€5,000	€4,000	€1,000
Silver	€3,000	€2,400	€600
Bronze	€1,500	€1,200	€300
