= Judo at the 2024 Summer Olympics =

Judo Judo at the Games of the XXXIII Olympiad
- Venue: Grand Palais Éphémère
- Location: France
- Dates: 27 July – 3 August 2024
- No. of events: 15 (7 men, 7 women, 1 mixed)
- Competitors: 372 (186 men and 186 women) from 107 nations
- Website: Official website

Competition at external databases
- Links: IJF • EJU • JudoInside

Judo competitions at the 2024 Summer Olympics in Paris took place from 27 July to 3 August at Grand Palais Éphémère in Champ de Mars. The number of judokas competing across fourteen weight categories at these Games had been reduced from 393 in Tokyo 2020 to 372, with an equal distribution between men and women.

Despite the slight changes in athlete figures, the judo programme for Paris 2024 remained constant from the previous editions, as the competition featured an equal number of bodyweight classes for men and women, with seven each, and the return of the mixed team tournament.

== Competition format ==
The judo programme features a total of fourteen bodyweight classes, seven each for both men and women. Regularly starting on the first day of the competition, a single men's and women's weight category will occur each day before the programme concludes with the mixed team tournament (scheduled for 3 August).

In each weight category, athletes are seeded in a single-elimination bracket, a traditional knock-out format until the final with a slight twist. Those defeated in the quarterfinals will remain in the competition with a repechage draw resulting to double bronze-medal matches awarded to the judokas.

The mixed-team tournament, an event introduced in the previous edition, features a squad of six individual judokas with three weight categories per gender competing against another team. To win every match, the team must score four victories out of six rounds.

Since the previous edition, several rule changes had been instituted to empower the judo programme for Paris 2024 and subsequent Summer Olympic editions. Based on the 2016 IJF rule changes, the game time for men have shortened by a minute, and the length of a game becomes four minutes similar to women judokas' games. The waza-ari scores remain constant from Tokyo 2020, requiring a judoka to pin his or her opponent between the ten and twenty-second limit, or to throw the opponent successfully but not well-controlled to be awarded as ippon. According to the fundamental judo rules, any athlete can win in a tripartite pathway: 1) to throw the opponent to the ground at a certain efficiency, 2) to hold down the opponent for 20 seconds, and 3) to force the opponent to a submission by arm lock or by strangulation. Originally, scoring an ippon ends the game but two waza-aris are now equal to an ippon in the competition.

== Qualification ==
The competition at these Games comprised a total of 372 athletes coming from their respective National Olympic Committees (NOCs); each could enter a maximum of fourteen judokas, seven each for both men and women, per bodyweight category. The host country France received a spot in all fourteen individual events, while fifteen places were reserved for the eligible NOCs through universality quotas awarded by the Tripartite Commission.

The remaining judokas were required to undergo a qualifying process to secure a spot in their respective weight category for the Games through the world ranking list prepared by the International Judo Federation (IJF). The qualification window had commenced on 24 June 2022, and concluded two years later (23 June 2024), with the final eligibility list published two days after the deadline.

The top 17 judokas in each bodyweight category from the world ranking list qualified directly for the Games, with each NOC subjected to a limit of one judoka per division. If an NOC had more than one judoka ranked among the top 17 in a weight class, it was for the NOC to decide which athlete obtained the quota place.

Further continental quotas (13 men and 12 women for Europe, 12 of each gender for Africa, ten men and 11 women for the Americas, ten of each gender for Asia, and five of each gender for Oceania) were also available. The International Judo Federation publishes a list of all judokas for each continent across all gender-based bodyweight categories to assign these quota places according to their world ranking points. Eligible judokas with the highest number of points on the ranking list will secure a continental quota for their respective NOC at the Games regardless of their gender and weight category. Each NOC may only enter a single judoka through the continental qualification rules.

The mixed-team tournament will offer five invitational places (one for each continent) to the highest-ranked NOCs that have qualified judokas in only five of the six mixed-team weight classes. Among these NOCs, the highest-ranked judoka vying for qualification will fill the remaining quota place to complete the team.

== Competition schedule ==
Legend
Q	Elimination and quarterfinals	F	Repechage, semifinals, and final medal matches

Schedule
Event↓/Date →	Sat 27		Sun 28		Mon 29		Tue 30		Wed 31		Thu 1		Fri 2		Sat 3	
Men's
Men's 60 kg	Q	F														
Men's 66 kg			Q	F												
Men's 73 kg					Q	F										
Men's 81 kg							Q	F								
Men's 90 kg									Q	F						
Men's 100 kg											Q	F				
Men's +100 kg													Q	F		
Women's
Women's 48 kg	Q	F														
Women's 52 kg			Q	F												
Women's 57 kg					Q	F										
Women's 63 kg							Q	F								
Women's 70 kg									Q	F						
Women's 78 kg											Q	F				
Women's +78 kg													Q	F		
Mixed
Mixed team															Q	F

== Medal summary ==
A total of 60 medals were won by 26 NOC's.

=== Medal table ===
* Host nation (France)

Rank	NOC	Gold	Silver	Bronze	Total
1	Japan	3	2	3	8
2	France*	2	2	6	10
3	Azerbaijan	2	0	0	2
4	Georgia	1	2	0	3
5	Brazil	1	1	2	4
6	Uzbekistan	1	0	2	3
7	Kazakhstan	1	0	1	2
8	Canada	1	0	0	1
8	Croatia	1	0	0	1
8	Italy	1	0	0	1
8	Slovenia	1	0	0	1
12	South Korea	0	2	3	5
13	Israel	0	2	1	3
14	Kosovo	0	1	1	2
15	Germany	0	1	0	1
15	Mexico	0	1	0	1
15	Mongolia	0	1	0	1
18	Moldova	0	0	2	2
18	Tajikistan	0	0	2	2
20	Austria	0	0	1	1
20	Belgium	0	0	1	1
20	China	0	0	1	1
20	Greece	0	0	1	1
20	Portugal	0	0	1	1
20	Spain	0	0	1	1
20	Sweden	0	0	1	1
Totals (26 entries)		15	15	30	60

=== Men's events ===
Event	Gold	Silver	Bronze
Extra-lightweight (60 kg)	Yeldos Smetov; Kazakhstan	Luka Mkheidze; France	Ryuju Nagayama; Japan
Extra-lightweight (60 kg)	Yeldos Smetov; Kazakhstan	Luka Mkheidze; France	Francisco Garrigós; Spain
Half-lightweight (66 kg)	Hifumi Abe; Japan	Willian Lima; Brazil	Gusman Kyrgyzbayev; Kazakhstan
Half-lightweight (66 kg)	Hifumi Abe; Japan	Willian Lima; Brazil	Denis Vieru; Moldova
Lightweight (73 kg)	Hidayat Heydarov; Azerbaijan	Joan-Benjamin Gaba; France	Adil Osmanov; Moldova
Lightweight (73 kg)	Hidayat Heydarov; Azerbaijan	Joan-Benjamin Gaba; France	Soichi Hashimoto; Japan
Half-middleweight (81 kg)	Takanori Nagase; Japan	Tato Grigalashvili; Georgia	Lee Joon-hwan; South Korea
Half-middleweight (81 kg)	Takanori Nagase; Japan	Tato Grigalashvili; Georgia	Somon Makhmadbekov; Tajikistan
Middleweight (90 kg)	Lasha Bekauri; Georgia	Sanshiro Murao; Japan	Maxime-Gaël Ngayap Hambou; France
Middleweight (90 kg)	Lasha Bekauri; Georgia	Sanshiro Murao; Japan	Theodoros Tselidis; Greece
Half-heavyweight (100 kg)	Zelym Kotsoiev; Azerbaijan	Ilia Sulamanidze; Georgia	Peter Paltchik; Israel
Half-heavyweight (100 kg)	Zelym Kotsoiev; Azerbaijan	Ilia Sulamanidze; Georgia	Muzaffarbek Turoboyev; Uzbekistan
Heavyweight (+100 kg)	Teddy Riner; France	Kim Min-jong; South Korea	Temur Rakhimov; Tajikistan
Heavyweight (+100 kg)	Teddy Riner; France	Kim Min-jong; South Korea	Alisher Yusupov; Uzbekistan

=== Women's events ===
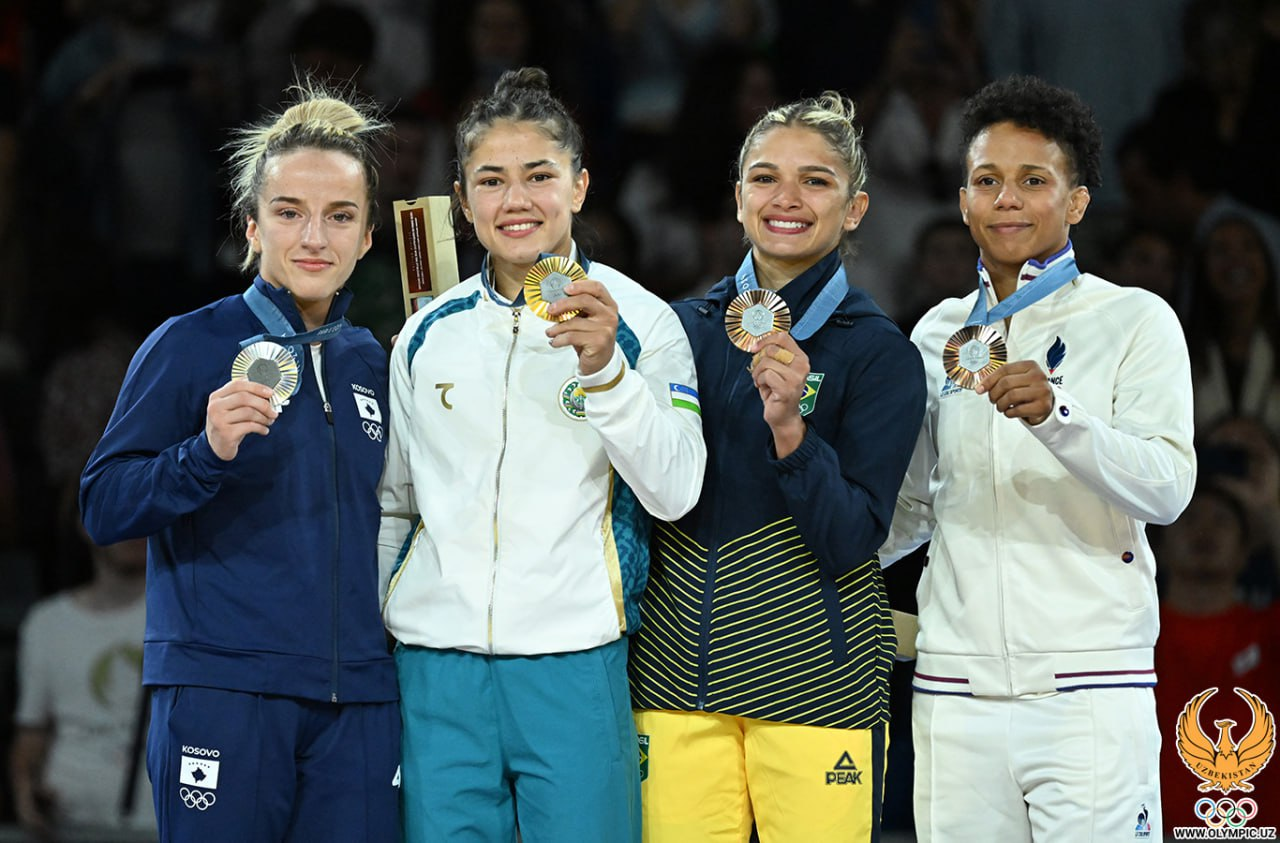
Women's 52 kg medalists

Event	Gold	Silver	Bronze
Extra-lightweight (48 kg)	Natsumi Tsunoda; Japan	Bavuudorjiin Baasankhüü; Mongolia	Shirine Boukli; France
Extra-lightweight (48 kg)	Natsumi Tsunoda; Japan	Bavuudorjiin Baasankhüü; Mongolia	Tara Babulfath; Sweden
Half-lightweight (52 kg)	Diyora Keldiyorova; Uzbekistan	Distria Krasniqi; Kosovo	Larissa Pimenta; Brazil
Half-lightweight (52 kg)	Diyora Keldiyorova; Uzbekistan	Distria Krasniqi; Kosovo	Amandine Buchard; France
Lightweight (57 kg)	Christa Deguchi; Canada	Huh Mi-mi; South Korea	Haruka Funakubo; Japan
Lightweight (57 kg)	Christa Deguchi; Canada	Huh Mi-mi; South Korea	Sarah-Léonie Cysique; France
Half-middleweight (63 kg)	Andreja Leški; Slovenia	Prisca Awiti Alcaraz; Mexico	Clarisse Agbegnenou; France
Half-middleweight (63 kg)	Andreja Leški; Slovenia	Prisca Awiti Alcaraz; Mexico	Laura Fazliu; Kosovo
Middleweight (70 kg)	Barbara Matić; Croatia	Miriam Butkereit; Germany	Michaela Polleres; Austria
Middleweight (70 kg)	Barbara Matić; Croatia	Miriam Butkereit; Germany	Gabriella Willems; Belgium
Half-heavyweight (78 kg)	Alice Bellandi; Italy	Inbar Lanir; Israel	Ma Zhenzhao; China
Half-heavyweight (78 kg)	Alice Bellandi; Italy	Inbar Lanir; Israel	Patrícia Sampaio; Portugal
Heavyweight (+78 kg)	Beatriz Souza; Brazil	Raz Hershko; Israel	Kim Ha-yun; South Korea
Heavyweight (+78 kg)	Beatriz Souza; Brazil	Raz Hershko; Israel	Romane Dicko; France

=== Mixed events ===
Event	Gold	Silver	Bronze
Mixed team	France; Shirine Boukli; Joan-Benjamin Gaba; Amandine Buchard; Walide Khyar; Sarah-Léonie Cysique; Luka Mkheidze; Clarisse Agbegnenou; Alpha Oumar Djalo; Marie-Ève Gahié; Maxime-Gaël Ngayap Hambou; Romane Dicko; Aurélien Diesse; Madeleine Malonga; Teddy Riner	Japan; Uta Abe; Hifumi Abe; Haruka Funakubo; Soichi Hashimoto; Natsumi Tsunoda; Ryuju Nagayama; Saki Niizoe; Sanshiro Murao; Miku Takaichi; Takanori Nagase; Aaron Wolf; Rika Takayama; Akira Sone; Tatsuru Saito	Brazil; Daniel Cargnin; Leonardo Gonçalves; Willian Lima; Rafael Macedo; Guilherme Schimidt; Rafael Silva; Larissa Pimenta; Ketleyn Quadros; Rafaela Silva; Beatriz Souza
Mixed team	France; Shirine Boukli; Joan-Benjamin Gaba; Amandine Buchard; Walide Khyar; Sarah-Léonie Cysique; Luka Mkheidze; Clarisse Agbegnenou; Alpha Oumar Djalo; Marie-Ève Gahié; Maxime-Gaël Ngayap Hambou; Romane Dicko; Aurélien Diesse; Madeleine Malonga; Teddy Riner	Japan; Uta Abe; Hifumi Abe; Haruka Funakubo; Soichi Hashimoto; Natsumi Tsunoda; Ryuju Nagayama; Saki Niizoe; Sanshiro Murao; Miku Takaichi; Takanori Nagase; Aaron Wolf; Rika Takayama; Akira Sone; Tatsuru Saito	South Korea; Lee Hye-kyeong; Kim Won-jin; Jung Ye-rin; An Ba-ul; Huh Mi-mi; Kim Ji-su; Lee Joon-hwan; Han Ju-yeop; Yoon Hyun-ji; Kim Ha-yun; Kim Min-jong

== See also ==
- Judo at the 2022 Asian Games
- Judo at the 2023 Pan American Games
- Judo at the 2024 Summer Paralympics
