= Tatsuru Saito =

Japanese judoka (born 2002)

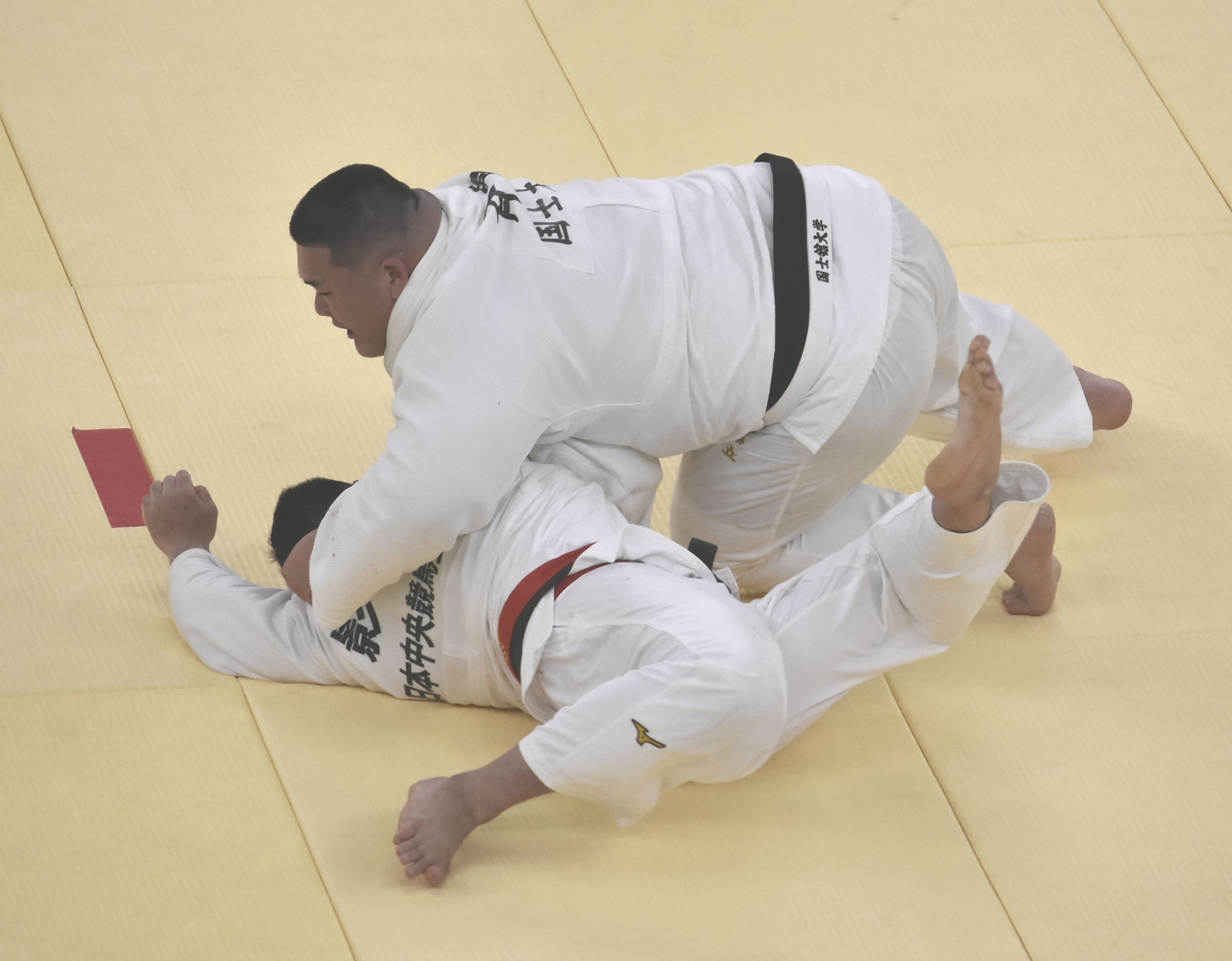
- Saito in 2022

Personal information
- Born: 8 March 2002 (age 24) Osaka, Japan
- Occupation: Judoka

Sport
- Country: Japan
- Sport: Judo
- Weight class: +100 kg

Achievements and titles
- Olympic Games: 5th (2024)
- World Champ.: (silver) (2022)
Medal record
Men's judo
Representing Japan
Olympic Games
Silver medal – second place	2024 Paris	Mixed team
World Championships
Gold medal – first place	2022 Tashkent	Mixed team
Gold medal – first place	2023 Doha	Mixed team
Silver medal – second place	2022 Tashkent	+100 kg
World Masters
Gold medal – first place	2022 Jerusalem	+100 kg
Bronze medal – third place	2023 Budapest	+100 kg
IJF Grand Slam
Gold medal – first place	2021 Baku	+100 kg
Gold medal – first place	2024 Astana	+100 kg
Silver medal – second place	2023 Tashkent	+100 kg
Silver medal – second place	2024 Antalya	+100 kg
World Juniors Championships
Gold medal – first place	2018 Nassau	Mixed team

Profile at external databases
- IJF: 44248
- JudoInside.com: 116503
- Updated on 3 August 2024

Tatsuru Saito (born 8 March 2002) is a Japanese judoka who won the 2022 All-Japan Judo Championships.

== Personal life ==
Saito is the son of Olympic champion Hitoshi Saito.
