= Inal Tasoev (judoka) =

Russian judoka (born 1998)

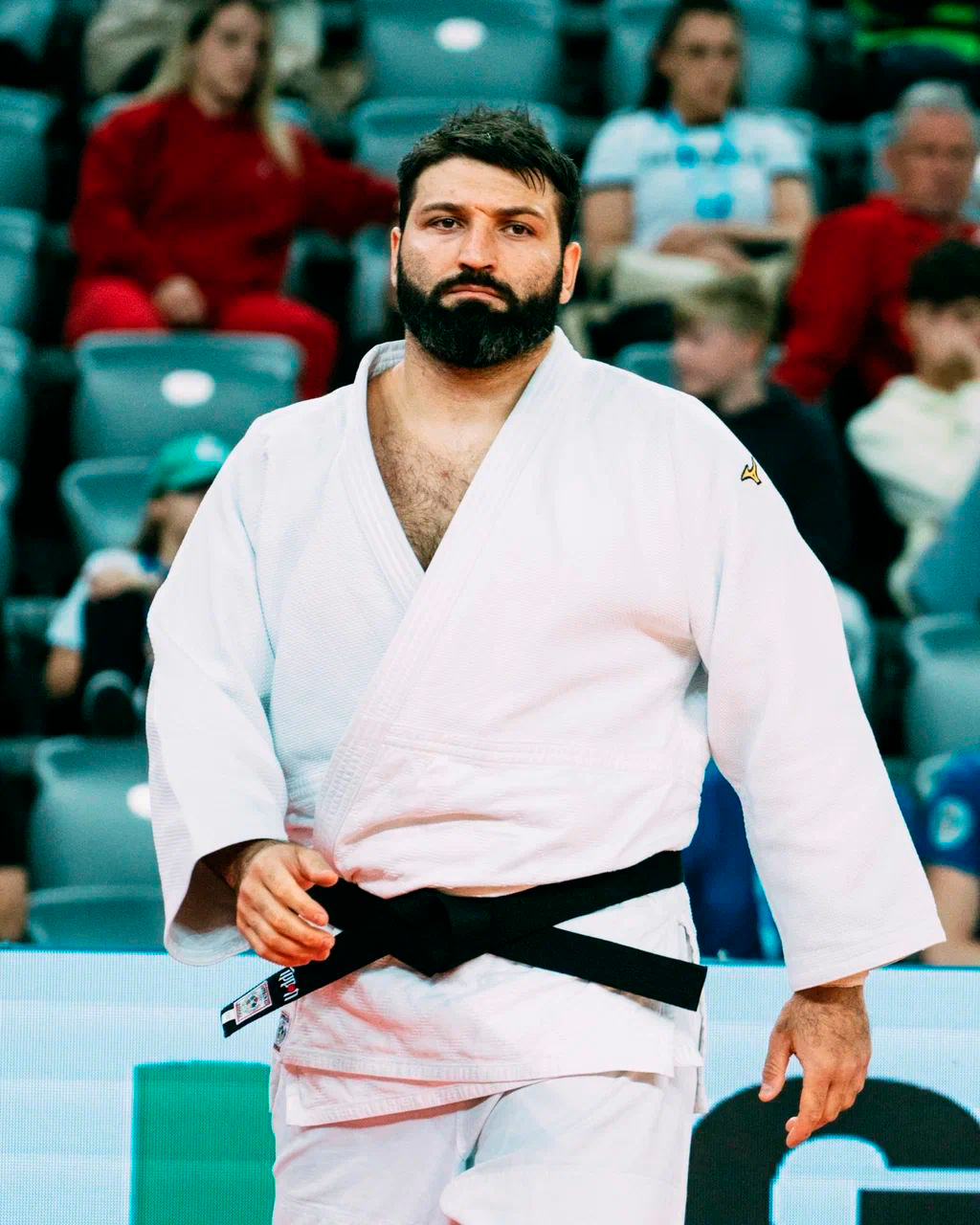

Personal information
- Native name: Инал Валикоевич Тасоев
- Full name: Inal Valikoyevich Tasoev
- Born: 5 February 1998 (age 28) Vladikavkaz, North Ossetia-Alania, Russia
- Occupation: Judoka

Sport
- Country: Russia
- Sport: Judo
- Weight class: +100 kg

Achievements and titles
- World Champ.: (gold) (2023, 2025, 2026)
- European Champ.: (gold) (2021, 2024, 2025)
- Highest world ranking: 1^{st}
Medal record
Men's judo
Representing Russia
World Championships
Gold medal – first place	2026 Baku	+100 kg
Silver medal – second place	2026 Baku	Mixed team
Bronze medal – third place	2018 Baku	Mixed team
Bronze medal – third place	2019 Tokyo	Mixed team
European Games
Gold medal – first place	2019 Minsk	Mixed team
Silver medal – second place	2019 Minsk	+100 kg
European Championships
Gold medal – first place	2021 Lisbon	+100 kg
Silver medal – second place	2020 Prague	+100 kg
World Masters
Silver medal – second place	2021 Doha	+100 kg
IJF Grand Slam
Gold medal – first place	2018 Abu Dhabi	+100 kg
Gold medal – first place	2019 Osaka	+100 kg
Gold medal – first place	2020 Budapest	+100 kg
Gold medal – first place	2021 Paris	+100 kg
Gold medal – first place	2026 Astana	+100 kg
Gold medal – first place	2026 Lausanne	+100 kg
Silver medal – second place	2019 Düsseldorf	+100 kg
Bronze medal – third place	2019 Brasilia	+100 kg
Bronze medal – third place	2020 Paris	+100 kg
Bronze medal – third place	2025 Tokyo	+100 kg
Bronze medal – third place	2026 Ulaanbaatar	+100 kg
IJF Grand Prix
Gold medal – first place	2018 Antalya	+100 kg
Bronze medal – third place	2018 Zagreb	+100 kg
World Juniors Championships
Gold medal – first place	2017 Zagreb	+100 kg
European Junior Championships
Gold medal – first place	2017 Maribor	+100 kg
World Cadets Championships
Silver medal – second place	2015 Sarajevo	+90 kg
European Cadet Championships
Gold medal – first place	2015 Sofia	+90 kg
Military World Games
Gold medal – first place	2019 Wuhan	+100 kg
Gold medal – first place	2019 Wuhan	Men's team
Representing Individual Neutral Athletes
World Championships
Gold medal – first place	2023 Doha	+100 kg
European Championships
Gold medal – first place	2024 Zagreb	+100 kg
IJF Grand Slam
Gold medal – first place	2023 Ulaanbaatar	+100 kg
Gold medal – first place	2023 Baku	+100 kg
Gold medal – first place	2023 Abu Dhabi	+100 kg
Bronze medal – third place	2023 Tokyo	+100 kg
Bronze medal – third place	2024 Tashkent	+100 kg
IJF Grand Prix
Gold medal – first place	2024 Odivelas	+100 kg
Representing the IJF
World Championships
Gold medal – first place	2025 Budapest	+100 kg
European Championships
Gold medal – first place	2025 Podgorica	+100 kg
IJF Grand Slam
Gold medal – first place	2022 Ulaanbaatar	+100 kg
Gold medal – first place	2025 Paris	+100 kg
Gold medal – first place	2025 Tbilisi	+100 kg

Profile at external databases
- IJF: 21360
- JudoInside.com: 95729
- Updated on 10 October 2026

Inal Valikoyevich Tasoev (Russian: Инал Валикоевич Тасоев; born 5 February 1998) is a Russian judoka of Ossetian heritage.

Tasoev participated at the 2018 World Judo Championships, winning a bronze medal in the mixed team event. In 2021, Tasoev won the silver medal in the +100 kg event at the 2021 Judo World Masters held in Doha, Qatar.
