= İbrahim Tataroğlu =

Turkish judoka (born 2006)

Personal information
- Born: 1 January 2006 (age 20) Istanbul, Turkey
- Occupation: Judoka

Sport
- Country: Turkey
- Sport: Judo
- Weight class: +100 kg
- Club: Kocaeli BB Kağıt SC

Achievements and titles
- Olympic Games: R16 (2024)
- World Champ.: R16 (2024)
- European Champ.: (bronze) (2026)
Medal record
Men's judo
Representing Turkey
European Championships
Bronze medal – third place	2026 Tbilisi	+100 kg
IJF Grand Slam
Bronze medal – third place	2023 Antalya	+100 kg
Bronze medal – third place	2024 Astana	+100 kg
IJF Grand Prix
Gold medal – first place	2026 Linz	+100 kg
European U23 Championships
Bronze medal – third place	2025 Chisinau	+100 kg
World Juniors Championships
Silver medal – second place	2023 Odivelas	+100 kg
Bronze medal – third place	2024 Dushanbe	+100 kg
European Junior Championships
Gold medal – first place	2024 Tallinn	+100 kg
World Cadets Championships
Gold medal – first place	2023 Zagreb	+90 kg
European Cadet Championships
Silver medal – second place	2023 Odivelas	+90 kg
Bronze medal – third place	2022 Poreč	+90 kg
European Youth Olympic Festival
Gold medal – first place	2023 Maribor	+90 kg
Gold medal – first place	2023 Maribor	Mixed team
Mediterranean Games
Gold medal – first place	2026 Taranto	+100 kg
Bronze medal – third place	2026 Taranto	Mixed team

Profile at external databases
- IJF: 64635
- JudoInside.com: 86256
- Updated on 1 September 2026

İbrahim Tataroğlu (born 1 January 2006) is a Turkish Olympian judoka who competes in the heavyweight (+100 kg) division.

== Sport career ==
Tataroğlu is a member of Kocaeli BB Kağıt SC.

=== 2022 ===
Tataroğlu won the bronze medal in the +90 kg event at the 2022 European Cadet Championships in Poreč, Croatia.

=== 2023 ===
Tataroğlu took the bronze medal in the +100 kg event at the 2023 Antalya Grand Slam in Turkey.

Tataroğlu became world cadet champion in the +90 kg event at the 2023 World Cadets Championships in Zagreb, Croatia.

At the 2023 European Youth Olympic Festival in Maribor, Slovenia, Tataroğlu captured the gold medal ic the +90 kg event, and another gold medal in the Mixed team event with ten teammates.

Tataroğlu won the siver medal in +100 kg at the 2023 World Juniors Championships in Odivelas, Portugal.

Tataroğlu lost the Round of 16 match to Dutch Jelle Snippe in the +100 kg of the 2023 European Championships in Montpellier, France.

Tataroğlu was named the "Best Cadet Judoka of 2023 in Europe" in the +100 kg category by the European Judo Union.

=== 2024 ===
Tataroğlu failed to advance further from the Round of 16 in the +100 kg event of the 2024 World Championships in Abu Dhabi, United Arab Emirates.

Tataroğlu won the bronze medal at the 2024 Astana Grand Slam in Kazakhstan, and so received a quota to represent his country Turkey at the 2024 Summer Olympics in Paris, France. Competing in the men's +100 kg event, he defeated Slovenian Enej Marinič in the Round of 32, but lost to South Korean Kim Min-jong and was eliminated.

== Personal life ==
İbrahim Tataroğlu was born in İzmit, Kocaeli Province in 2006.
