= Alisher Yusupov =

Uzbekistani judoka (born 1998)

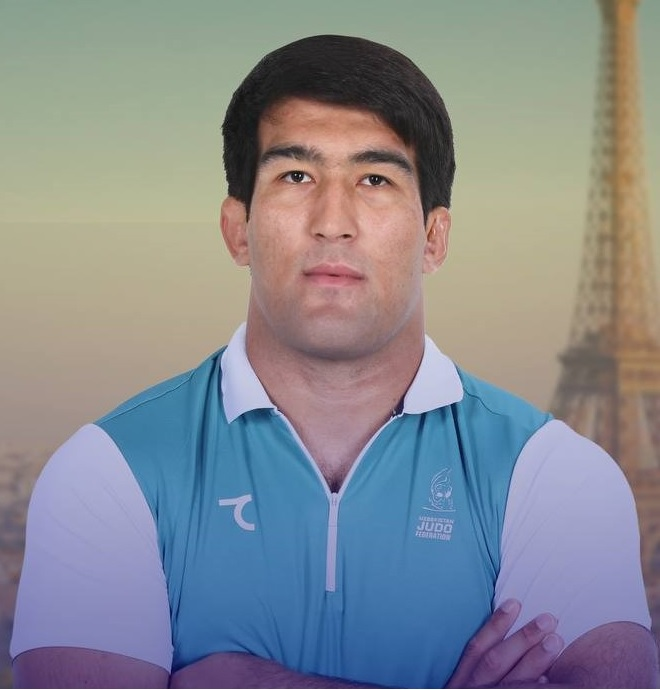
- Yusupov in 2024

Personal information
- Born: 27 November 1998 (age 27) Urganch District, Uzbekistan
- Occupation: Judoka

Sport
- Country: Uzbekistan
- Sport: Judo
- Weight class: +100 kg

Achievements and titles
- Olympic Games: (bronze) (2024)
- World Champ.: (bronze) (2023, 2024)
- Asian Champ.: (gold) (2026)
Medal record
Men's judo
Representing Uzbekistan
Olympic Games
Bronze medal – third place	2024 Paris	+100 kg
World Championships
Bronze medal – third place	2023 Doha	+100 kg
Bronze medal – third place	2024 Abu Dhabi	+100 kg
Asian Games
Silver medal – second place	2023 Hangzhou	Mixed team
Bronze medal – third place	2023 Hangzhou	+100 kg
Asian Championships
Gold medal – first place	2026 Ordos	+100 kg
World Masters
Bronze medal – third place	2022 Jerusalem	+100 kg
IJF Grand Slam
Gold medal – first place	2023 Tashkent	+100 kg
Silver medal – second place	2022 Antalya	+100 kg
Silver medal – second place	2022 Tbilisi	+100 kg
Silver medal – second place	2022 Baku	+100 kg
Silver medal – second place	2026 Tashkent	+100 kg
Bronze medal – third place	2019 Osaka	+100 kg
Bronze medal – third place	2023 Paris	+100 kg
Bronze medal – third place	2024 Paris	+100 kg
Bronze medal – third place	2025 Tashkent	+100 kg
IJF Grand Prix
Bronze medal – third place	2019 Zagreb	+100 kg
Asian Junior Championships
Silver medal – second place	2018 Beirut	+100 kg
Bronze medal – third place	2017 Bishkek	+100 kg
Islamic Solidarity Games
Silver medal – second place	2021 Konya	+100 kg

Profile at external databases
- IJF: 39063
- JudoInside.com: 98244
- Updated on 20 April 2026

Alisher Yusupov (born 27 November 1998) is an Uzbek judoka.

Yusupov is a bronze medalist from the 2019 Judo Grand Slam Osaka in the +100 kg category.
