= Daniel Allerstorfer =

Austrian Olympic judoka (born 1992)

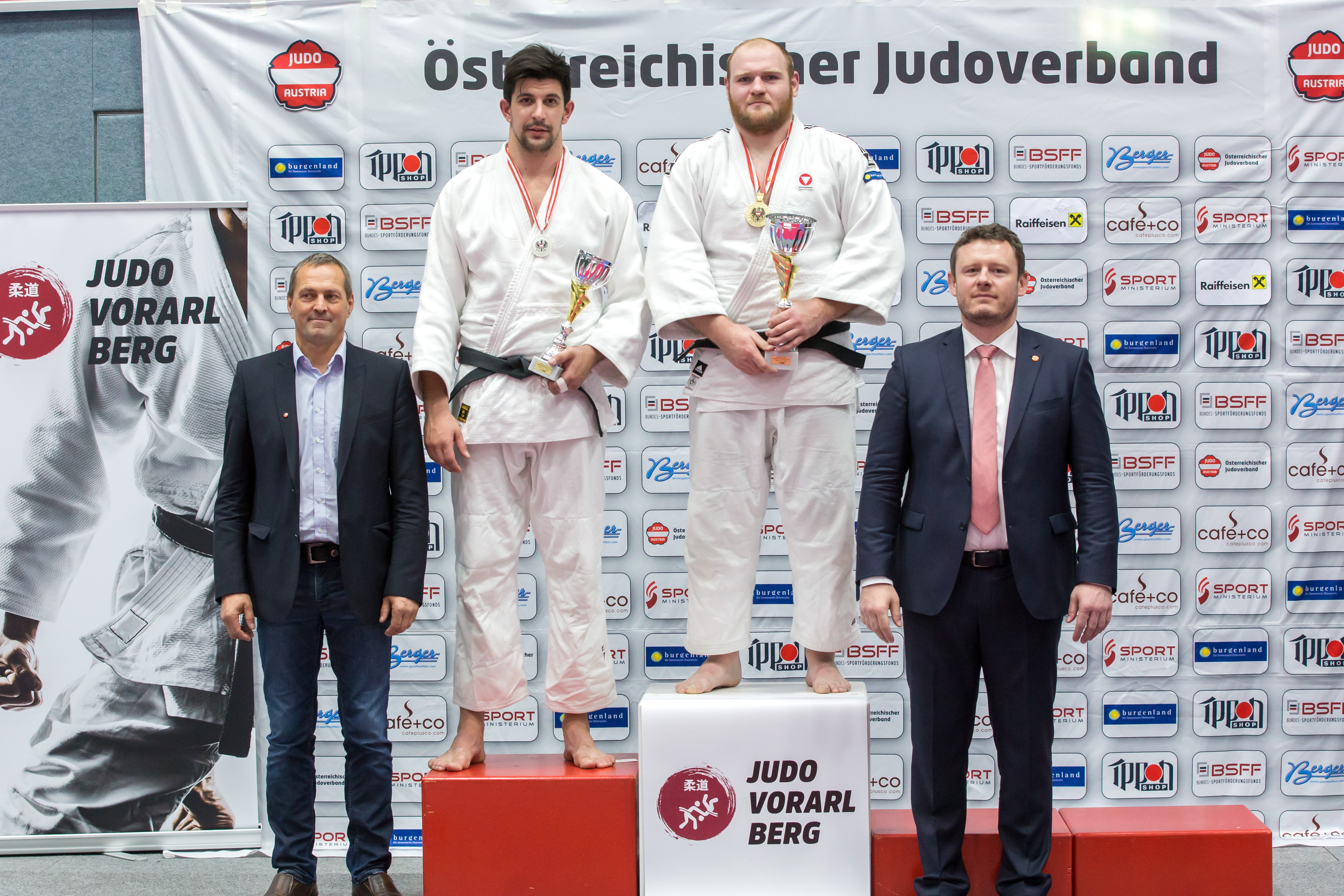
- Allerstorfer wins the Austrian champions 2017 in Hard

Personal information
- Nickname: Dani
- Nationality: Austrian
- Born: 4 December 1992 (age 33) Rohrbach, Upper Austria, Austria
- Occupation: Judoka
- Years active: 1999-2023
- Height: 1.83 m (6 ft 0 in)
- Weight: 130 kg (287 lb)

Sport
- Country: Austria
- Sport: Judo
- Weight class: +100 kg
- Rank: 2nd dan black belt
- League: Austrian 1. Bundesliga
- Club: UJZ Mühlviertel
- Turned pro: 2012

Achievements and titles
- Olympic Games: R32 (2016)
- World Champ.: 7th (2017)
- European Champ.: 7th (2021, 2022)
Medal record
Men's judo
Representing Austria
European Games
Bronze medal – third place	2019 Minsk	Mixed team
IJF Grand Prix
Silver medal – second place	2014 Tashkent	+100 kg
Bronze medal – third place	2014 Astana	+100 kg
Bronze medal – third place	2015 Tashkent	+100 kg
Bronze medal – third place	2018 Cancún	+100 kg
Bronze medal – third place	2019 Perth	+100 kg
European U23 Championships
Silver medal – second place	2013 Samokov	+100 kg
European Junior Championships
Gold medal – first place	2011 Lommel	+100 kg

Profile at external databases
- IJF: 3649
- JudoInside.com: 43987
- Updated on 1 December 2022

Daniel Allerstorfer (born 4 December 1992) is an Austrian judoka. He competed at the 2016 Summer Olympics in the men's +100 kg event, in which he was eliminated in the first round by Renat Saidov.

Allerstorfer started his judo carrier in 1999.

In the spring of 2018, Allerstorfer had a double herniated disc.

Allerstorfer made his last appearance the Austrian national team athlete at the Upper Austria Judo Grand Prix 2023.
