= Odkhüügiin Tsetsentsengel =

Mongolian judoka (born 1999)

Personal information
- Native name: Одхүүгийн Цэцэнцэнгэл
- Nationality: Mongolia
- Born: 18 October 1999 (age 26) Bayankhutag, Khentii, Mongolia
- Occupation: Judoka
- Height: 195 cm (6 ft 5 in)

Sport
- Country: Mongolia
- Sport: Judo
- Weight class: +100 kg

Achievements and titles
- Olympic Games: R32 (2024)
- World Champ.: R16 (2022, 2023)
- Asian Champ.: 5th (2022)
Medal record
Men's judo
Representing Mongolia
Asian Games
Bronze medal – third place	2022 Hangzhou	Mixed team
IJF Grand Slam
Gold medal – first place	2021 Abu Dhabi	+100 kg
Gold medal – first place	2022 Paris	+100 kg
Gold medal – first place	2023 Tel Aviv	+100 kg
Bronze medal – third place	2021 Baku	+100 kg
Bronze medal – third place	2023 Ulaanbaatar	+100 kg
IJF Grand Prix
Silver medal – second place	2022 Zagreb	+100 kg
Bronze medal – third place	2023 Almada	+100 kg
Asian Junior Championships
Gold medal – first place	2019 Taipei	+100 kg
Bronze medal – third place	2017 Bishkek	‍–‍100 kg
Asian Cadet Championships
Bronze medal – third place	2016 Kochi	‍–‍90 kg

Profile at external databases
- IJF: 16817
- JudoInside.com: 101030
- Updated on 3 August 2024

Odkhüügiin Tsetsentsengel (Mongolian: Одхүүгийн Цэцэнцэнгэл; born 18 October 1999) is a Mongolian judoka.

He is the gold medallist of the 2021 Judo Grand Slam Abu Dhabi in the +100 kg category.
