= Kim Min-jong (judoka) =

South Korean judoka (born 2000)

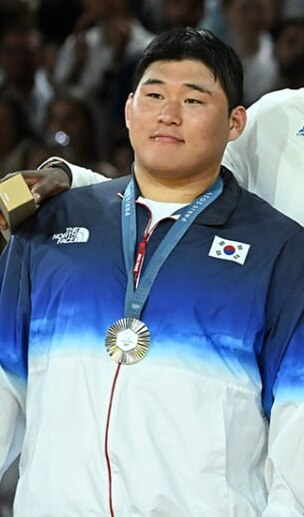
- Kim at the 2024 Olympics

Personal information
- Born: 1 September 2000 (age 26) Seoul, South Korea
- Occupation: Judoka

Sport
- Country: South Korea
- Sport: Judo
- Weight class: +100 kg

Achievements and titles
- Olympic Games: (silver) (2024)
- World Champ.: (gold) (2024)
- Asian Champ.: (silver) (2021, 2024)
- Highest world ranking: 1^{st}
Medal record
Men's judo
Representing South Korea
Olympic Games
Silver medal – second place	2024 Paris	+100 kg
Bronze medal – third place	2024 Paris	Mixed team
World Championships
Gold medal – first place	2024 Abu Dhabi	+100 kg
Silver medal – second place	2025 Budapest	Mixed team
Bronze medal – third place	2019 Tokyo	+100 kg
Bronze medal – third place	2022 Tashkent	+100 kg
Bronze medal – third place	2025 Budapest	+100 kg
Asian Games
Bronze medal – third place	2023 Hangzhou	+100 kg
Bronze medal – third place	2026 Aichi‑Nagoya	+100 kg
Asian Championships
Silver medal – second place	2021 Bishkek	+100 kg
Silver medal – second place	2024 Hong Kong	+100 kg
Bronze medal – third place	2019 Fujairah	+100 kg
Bronze medal – third place	2025 Bangkok	+100 kg
IJF Grand Slam
Gold medal – first place	2026 Ulaanbaatar	+100 kg
Silver medal – second place	2023 Ulaanbaatar	+100 kg
Silver medal – second place	2023 Tokyo	+100 kg
Silver medal – second place	2024 Paris	+100 kg
Bronze medal – third place	2020 Düsseldorf	+100 kg
Bronze medal – third place	2021 Tashkent	+100 kg
Bronze medal – third place	2022 Paris	+100 kg
Bronze medal – third place	2026 Paris	+100 kg
IJF Grand Prix
Gold medal – first place	2019 Hohhot	+100 kg
Gold medal – first place	2022 Almada	+100 kg
Gold medal – first place	2023 Almada	+100 kg
Silver medal – second place	2024 Odivelas	+100 kg
World Juniors Championships
Bronze medal – third place	2019 Marrakesh	+100 kg
Asian Junior Championships
Gold medal – first place	2017 Bishkek	+100 kg
Gold medal – first place	2018 Beirut	+100 kg
World Cadets Championships
Gold medal – first place	2017 Santiago	+90 kg
Asian Cadet Championships
Gold medal – first place	2016 Kochi	+90 kg
Summer Universiade
Gold medal – first place	2021 Chengdu	+100 kg
Silver medal – second place	2019 Naples	Men's team
Bronze medal – third place	2019 Naples	+90 kg
Bronze medal – third place	2021 Chengdu	Men's team
Representing Korea
World Championships
Bronze medal – third place	2018 Baku	Mixed team

Profile at external databases
- IJF: 34569
- JudoInside.com: 108779
- Updated on 2 October 2026

Kim Min-jong (Korean: 김민종; born 1 September 2000) is a South Korean judoka.

He participated in the Mixed team event at the 2018 World Judo Championships, winning a medal.

In 2021, he competed in the men's +100 kg event at the 2021 Judo World Masters held in Doha, Qatar.
