= Vlăduț Simionescu =

Romanian judoka (born 1990)

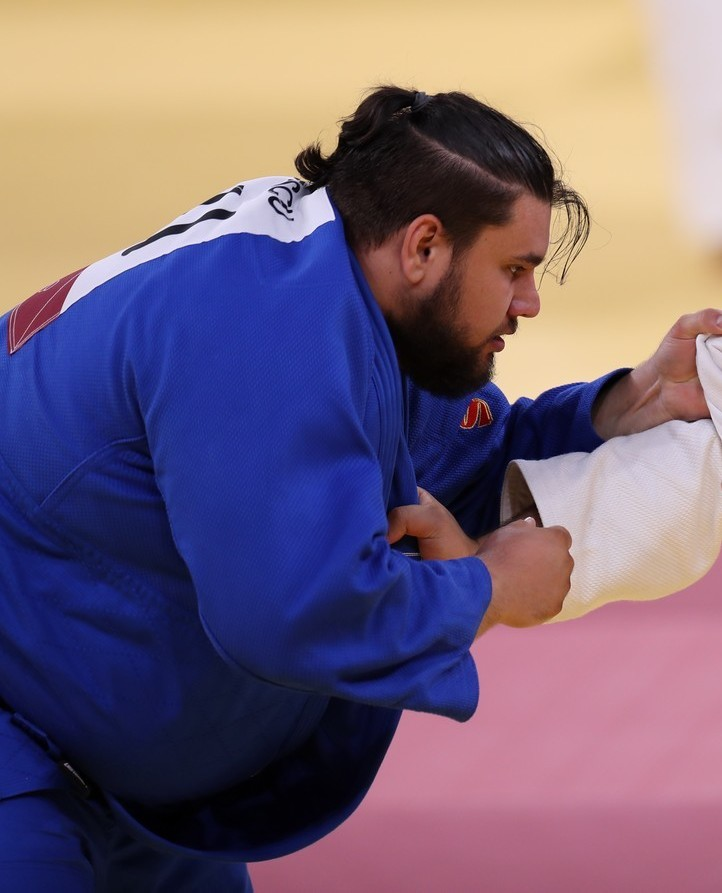

Personal information
- Born: 30 April 1990 (age 36)
- Occupation: Judoka
- Website: vladsimionescu.ro

Sport
- Country: Romania
- Sport: Judo
- Weight class: +100 kg

Achievements and titles
- Olympic Games: R16 (2012, 2020)
- World Champ.: R16 (2011, 2019)
- European Champ.: R16 (2012, 2014, 2015, 2019, 2022, 2024)
Medal record
Men's judo
Representing Romania
IJF Grand Slam
Silver medal – second place	2014 Abu Dhabi	+100 kg
Silver medal – second place	2021 Abu Dhabi	+100 kg
Bronze medal – third place	2019 Baku	+100 kg
IJF Grand Prix
Silver medal – second place	2015 Zagreb	+100 kg
Silver medal – second place	2018 The Hague	+100 kg
Silver medal – second place	2021 Zagreb	+100 kg
Bronze medal – third place	2014 Zagreb	+100 kg
Bronze medal – third place	2014 Jeju	+100 kg
Bronze medal – third place	2017 Zagreb	+100 kg
Bronze medal – third place	2019 Antalya	+100 kg
European U23 Championships
Silver medal – second place	2011 Tyumen	+100 kg
European Junior Championships
Bronze medal – third place	2009 Yerevan	+100 kg
Summer Universiade
Bronze medal – third place	2015 Gwangju	+100 kg
Bronze medal – third place	2015 Gwangju	Open

Profile at external databases
- IJF: 1261
- JudoInside.com: 42508
- Updated on 27 April 2024

Vlăduț Simionescu (born 30 April 1990 in Iași, Romania) is a Romanian judoka. He competed at the 2012 Summer Olympics in the +100 kg event.
