= Guram Tushishvili =

Georgian judoka (born 1995)

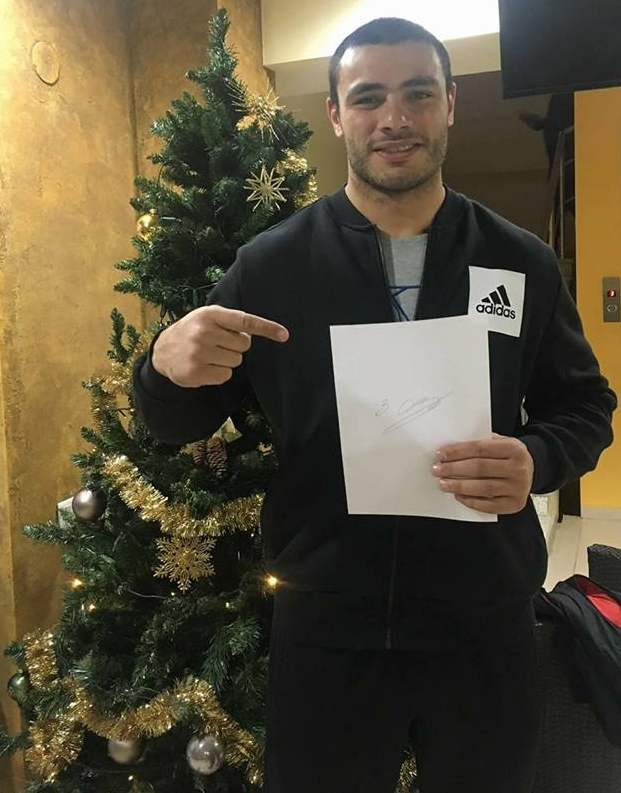

Personal information
- Nickname: "ლომი" (Lion)
- Born: 5 February 1995 (age 31) Kojori, Tbilisi, Georgia
- Occupation: Judoka
- Height: 1.93 m (6 ft 4 in)

Sport
- Country: Georgia
- Sport: Judo
- Weight class: +100 kg

Achievements and titles
- Olympic Games: (silver) (2020)
- World Champ.: (gold) (2018)
- European Champ.: (gold) (2017, 2019, 2026)
- Highest world ranking: 1^{st}
Medal record
Men's judo
Representing Georgia
Olympic Games
Silver medal – second place	2020 Tokyo	+100 kg
World Championships
Gold medal – first place	2018 Baku	+100 kg
Gold medal – first place	2025 Budapest	Mixed team
Silver medal – second place	2024 Abu Dhabi	+100 kg
Silver medal – second place	2025 Budapest	+100 kg
Bronze medal – third place	2022 Tashkent	+100 kg
Bronze medal – third place	2023 Doha	Mixed team
Bronze medal – third place	2024 Abu Dhabi	Mixed team
Bronze medal – third place	2026 Baku	Mixed team
European Games
Gold medal – first place	2019 Minsk	+100 kg
Gold medal – first place	2023 Kraków	Mixed team
European Championships
Gold medal – first place	2017 Warsaw	+100 kg
Gold medal – first place	2017 Warsaw	Men's team
Gold medal – first place	2025 Podgorica	Mixed team
Gold medal – first place	2026 Tbilisi	+100 kg
Silver medal – second place	2023 Montpellier	+100 kg
Silver medal – second place	2024 Zagreb	+100 kg
Silver medal – second place	2024 Zagreb	Mixed team
Bronze medal – third place	2020 Prague	+100 kg
Bronze medal – third place	2021 Lisbon	+100 kg
Bronze medal – third place	2022 Sofia	+100 kg
World Masters
Gold medal – first place	2017 Saint Petersburg	+100 kg
Gold medal – first place	2018 Guangzhou	+100 kg
IJF Grand Slam
Gold medal – first place	2017 Baku	+100 kg
Gold medal – first place	2020 Düsseldorf	+100 kg
Gold medal – first place	2022 Tel Aviv	+100 kg
Gold medal – first place	2022 Antalya	+100 kg
Gold medal – first place	2024 Tbilisi	+100 kg
Silver medal – second place	2023 Baku	+100 kg
Silver medal – second place	2025 Tbilisi	+100 kg
Bronze medal – third place	2021 Tel Aviv	+100 kg
Bronze medal – third place	2026 Lausanne	+100 kg
IJF Grand Prix
Gold medal – first place	2018 Tbilisi	+100 kg
Gold medal – first place	2018 Zagreb	+100 kg
Gold medal – first place	2019 Tashkent	+100 kg
Gold medal – first place	2025 Linz	+100 kg
Bronze medal – third place	2024 Linz	+100 kg
World Juniors Championships
Gold medal – first place	2013 Ljubljana	Men's team
European Junior Championships
Gold medal – first place	2013 Sarajevo	‍–‍100 kg
Gold medal – first place	2015 Oberwart	+100 kg
Bronze medal – third place	2012 Poreč	‍–‍100 kg
World Cadets Championships
Gold medal – first place	2011 Kyiv	‍–‍90 kg
European Cadet Championships
Bronze medal – third place	2011 Cottonera	‍–‍90 kg

Profile at external databases
- IJF: 8178
- JudoInside.com: 75563
- Updated on 31 August 2026

Guram Tushishvili (born 5 February 1995) is a Georgian judoka who won a gold medal at the 2018 World Judo Championships in Baku in the men's +100 kg event. He previously won a gold medal at the 2017 European Judo Championships in Warsaw in the men's +100 kg event. In 2020, Tushishvili won a bronze medal in the men's +100 kg event at the 2020 European Judo Championships in Prague.

In 2021, Tushishvili competed in the men's +100 kg event at the 2021 Judo World Masters held in Doha. He won the gold medal in his event at the 2022 Judo Grand Slam Tel Aviv.

On 25 March 2019 the International Judo Federation disqualified him from any competition for two months after participating in another ranked combat sport, which is prohibited for ranked judokas.

Tushishvili participated in the 2024 Summer Olympics in Paris, but was disqualified for unsportsmanlike behavior during the quarter-finals against France's Teddy Riner, making him ineligible to compete in any events for the Georgian national team for the remainder of the Olympics. The incident came about when Tushishvili unsuccessfully attempted to throw Riner, resulting in Tushishvili being brought down on his back on the mat; Tushishvili reacted by pushing his foot into Riner's groin, bringing the unresisting Riner to the mat; Tushishvili then angrily gestured with his hand in front of Riner's face, and when Riner went to stand up, Tushishvili pushed his knee against Riner's chest, sending Riner back to the mat.

== Medals ==
2017
(gold) Grand Slam, Baku
(gold) World Masters, St. Petersburg
2018
(gold) Grand Prix, Tbilisi
(gold) Grand Prix, Zagreb
(gold) World Masters, Guangzhou
