= Ushangi Kokauri =

Azerbaijani Olympic judoka

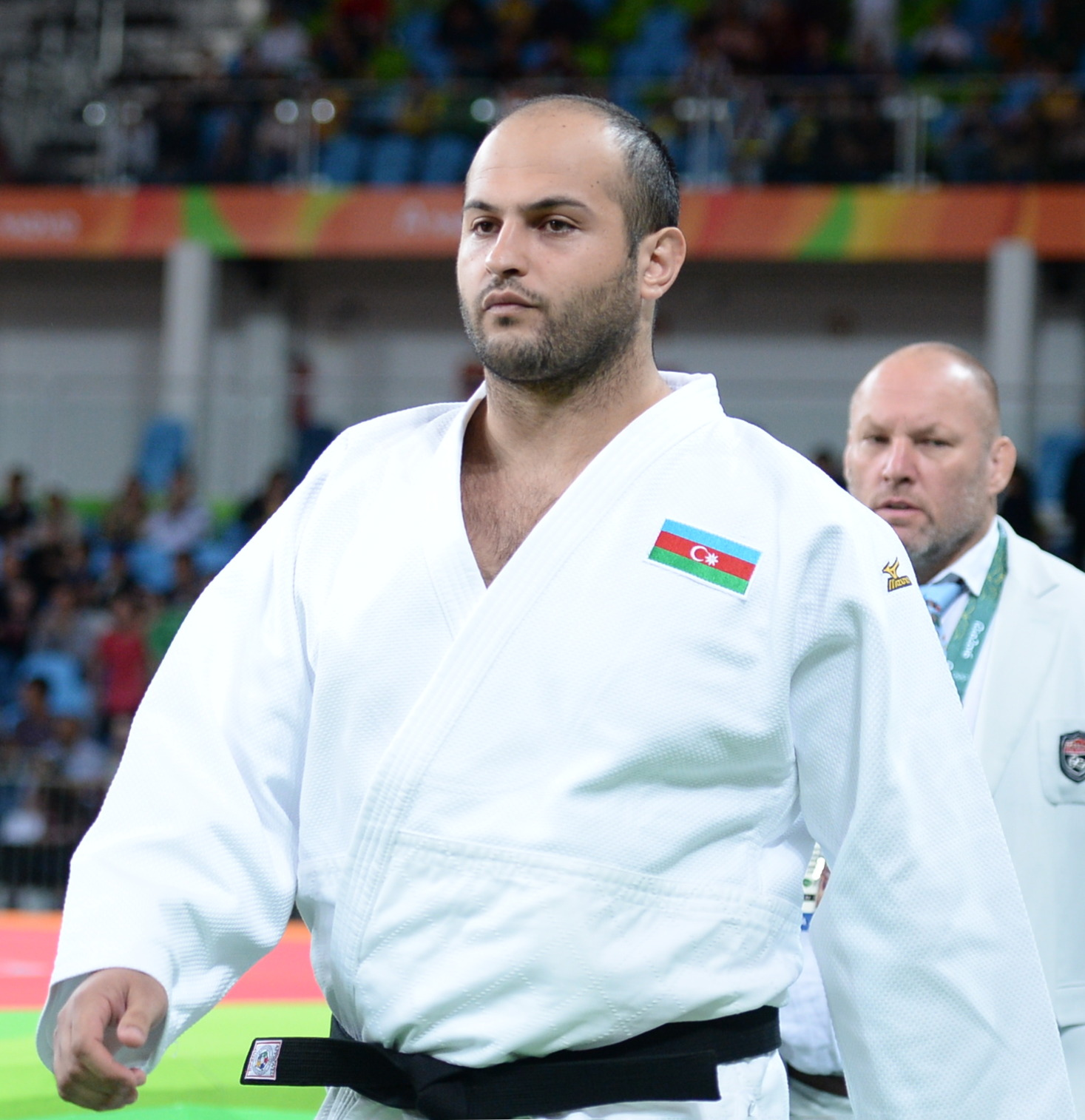

Personal information
- Nationality: Georgian
- Citizenship: Azerbaijani
- Born: 10 January 1992 (age 34) Gori, Georgia
- Occupation: Judoka
- Weight: 130–135 kg (287–298 lb)

Sport
- Country: Azerbaijan
- Sport: Judo
- Weight class: +100 kg

Achievements and titles
- Olympic Games: 7th (2024)
- World Champ.: (silver) (2018, 2026)
- European Champ.: 5th (2019, 2025)
Medal record
Men's judo
Representing Azerbaijan
World Championships
Silver medal – second place	2018 Baku	+100 kg
Silver medal – second place	2026 Baku	+100 kg
European Championships
Bronze medal – third place	2016 Kazan	Men's team
IJF Grand Slam
Silver medal – second place	2022 Paris	+100 kg
Silver medal – second place	2023 Tel Aviv	+100 kg
Silver medal – second place	2024 Tbilisi	+100 kg
Silver medal – second place	2024 Abu Dhabi	+100 kg
Silver medal – second place	2026 Astana	+100 kg
Silver medal – second place	2026 Abu Dhabi	+100 kg
Bronze medal – third place	2019 Paris	+100 kg
Bronze medal – third place	2019 Abu Dhabi	+100 kg
Bronze medal – third place	2021 Baku	+100 kg
Bronze medal – third place	2025 Abu Dhabi	+100 kg
Bronze medal – third place	2026 Dushanbe	+100 kg
IJF Grand Prix
Gold medal – first place	2025 Guadalajara	+100 kg
Silver medal – second place	2016 Almaty	+100 kg
Bronze medal – third place	2022 Zagreb	+100 kg
Bronze medal – third place	2023 Zagreb	+100 kg
European U23 Championships
Silver medal – second place	2014 Wrocław	+100 kg
Islamic Solidarity Games
Gold medal – first place	2017 Baku	Men's team

Profile at external databases
- IJF: 13278
- JudoInside.com: 51464
- Updated on 1 November 2026

Ushangi Kokauri (Azerbaijani: Uşanqi Kokauri, born 10 January 1992) is an Azerbaijani judoka of Georgian origin, and member of the national team of Azerbaijan in judo, who competes in the over 100 kg weight category. Ushangi represented Azerbaijan at the 2016 Summer Olympics in Rio de Janeiro, where he competed in the men's +100 kg event, in which he was eliminated in the second round by Hisayoshi Harasawa. He also take part in the 2020 Tokyo Olympic Games.

== Biography ==
Ushangi Kokauri was born 10 January 1992 in Georgia. In 2009, 2010 and 2011 he won Georgian youth judo championship. In 2012 he won the bronze medal in the championship of Georgia among adults. In November 2015 IJF Oceania Cup in Wollongong (Australia) won a silver medal. In the same year he won the bronze medal at the IJF African Cup in Port Louis. In February 2016 won a bronze medal at the IJF European Cup in Prague and gold – in Oberwart. In March of the same year he won the IJF African Cup in Casablanca. In April of the same in 2016 he won the bronze medal of the European Judo Championships in Kazan in the team standings. In May 2016, he was ranked 23rd in the world rankings. It was his best result in the world rankings.

In October 2026, at the World Judo Championships in Baku, Ushangi Kokauri lost to Russian Inal Tasoev in the final and won a silver medal.
