= Temur Rakhimov =

Tajikistani judoka (born 1997)

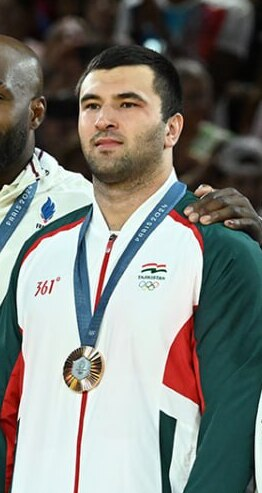
- Rakhimov at the 2024 Summer Olympics

Personal information
- Born: 8 July 1997 (age 28) Rudaki District, Tajikistan
- Occupation: Judoka

Sport
- Country: Tajikistan
- Sport: Judo
- Weight class: +100 kg

Achievements and titles
- Olympic Games: (bronze) (2024)
- World Champ.: (bronze) (2025)
- Asian Champ.: (silver) (2019, 2022, 2023, 2025)
- Highest world ranking: 1^{st}
Medal record
Men's judo
Representing Tajikistan
Olympic Games
Bronze medal – third place	2024 Paris	+100 kg
World Championships
Bronze medal – third place	2025 Budapest	+100 kg
Asian Games
Silver medal – second place	2023 Hangzhou	+100 kg
Asian Championships
Silver medal – second place	2019 Fujairah	+100 kg
Silver medal – second place	2022 Nur‑Sultan	+100 kg
Silver medal – second place	2025 Bangkok	+100 kg
Bronze medal – third place	2021 Bishkek	+100 kg
Bronze medal – third place	2024 Hong Kong	+100 kg
World Masters
Silver medal – second place	2022 Jerusalem	+100 kg
Silver medal – second place	2023 Budapest	+100 kg
IJF Grand Slam
Gold medal – first place	2022 Baku	+100 kg
Gold medal – first place	2025 Dushanbe	+100 kg
Silver medal – second place	2021 Baku	+100 kg
Silver medal – second place	2023 Astana	+100 kg
Silver medal – second place	2024 Dushanbe	+100 kg
Silver medal – second place	2024 Astana	+100 kg
Bronze medal – third place	2021 Abu Dhabi	+100 kg
Bronze medal – third place	2022 Tel Aviv	+100 kg
Bronze medal – third place	2022 Antalya	+100 kg
Bronze medal – third place	2022 Abu Dhabi	+100 kg
IJF Grand Prix
Silver medal – second place	2023 Dushanbe	+100 kg
Bronze medal – third place	2019 Marrakesh	+100 kg
World Juniors Championships
Bronze medal – third place	2017 Zagreb	‍–‍100 kg
Asian Junior Championships
Silver medal – second place	2017 Bishkek	‍–‍100 kg
Asian Cadet Championships
Silver medal – second place	2014 Hong Kong	+90 kg

Profile at external databases
- IJF: 17268
- JudoInside.com: 45153
- Updated on 20 June 2025

Temur Rakhimov (born 8 July 1997) is a Tajikistani judoka.

Rakhimov is a bronze medallist of the 2019 Judo Grand Prix Marrakesh and he represented Tajikistan at the 2020 Summer Olympics

Rakhimov won one of the bronze medals in his event at the 2022 Judo Grand Slam Tel Aviv held in Tel Aviv, Israel.
