= Giannis Antoniou =

Cypriot judoka (born 2005)

Personal information
- Born: 8 March 2005 (age 21)
- Occupation: Judoka

Sport
- Country: Cyprus
- Sport: Judo
- Weight class: +100 kg

Achievements and titles
- World Champ.: R16 (2025)
- European Champ.: R16 (2024, 2026)
- Commonwealth Games: (gold) (2026)
Medal record
Men's judo
Representing Cyprus
IJF Grand Prix
Gold medal – first place	2026 Lima	+100 kg
World Juniors Championships
Bronze medal – third place	2023 Odivelas	+100 kg
European Junior Championships
Silver medal – second place	2023 The Hague	+100 kg
World University Games
Bronze medal – third place	2025 Essen	+100 kg
Commonwealth Games
Gold medal – first place	2026 Glasgow	+100 kg

Profile at external databases
- IJF: 59783
- JudoInside.com: 146134
- Updated on 17 August 2026

Giannis Antoniou (Greek: Γιάννης Αντωνίου; born 8 March 2005) is a Cypriot judoka.

== Career ==
Antoniou decided to leave Cyprus at 15 years old to pursue judo in Georgia. He competed at the 2023 World Judo Juniors Championships and won a bronze medal in the +100 kg category.

In August 2026, he competed at the 2026 Commonwealth Games and won a gold medal in the +100 kg category, the nation's first gold medal of the Games. This was Cyprus' first gold medal in judo at the Commonwealth Games. Later that month he competed at the 2026 Judo Grand Prix Lima and won a gold medal in the +100 kg category. He became the first Cypriot judoka to win a Grand Prix title and an event on the IJF World Tour.
