= Martti Puumalainen =

Finnish judoka

Personal information
- Born: 14 April 1997 (age 29)
- Occupation: Judoka
- Website: teampuumalainen.fi
- Military career
- Allegiance: Finland
- Branch: Finnish Defence Forces
- Rank: Kersantti

Sport
- Country: Finland
- Sport: Judo
- Weight class: +100 kg
- Coached by: Rok Drakšič

Achievements and titles
- Olympic Games: R16 (2024)
- World Champ.: 5th (2026)
- European Champ.: (gold) (2023)
Medal record
Men's judo
Representing Finland
European Championships
Gold medal – first place	2023 Montpellier	+100 kg
World Masters
Gold medal – first place	2023 Budapest	+100 kg
IJF Grand Slam
Silver medal – second place	2026 Lausanne	+100 kg
IJF Grand Prix
Gold medal – first place	2022 Perth	+100 kg
Gold medal – first place	2025 Gold Coast	+100 kg
Bronze medal – third place	2021 Zagreb	+100 kg
Bronze medal – third place	2025 Guadalajara	+100 kg
Bronze medal – third place	2026 Qingdao	+100 kg
European U23 Championships
Bronze medal – third place	2019 Izhevsk	+100 kg

Profile at external databases
- IJF: 13844
- JudoInside.com: 75085
- Updated on 10 October 2026

Martti Puumalainen (born 14 April 1997) is a Finnish judoka. He won the gold medal at the men's +100 kg event at the 2023 European Judo Championships. Puumalainen works for the Finnish Defence Forces and his military rank is sergeant. He is also the first ever Finnish judoka to win the World Masters event.
