= Jur Spijkers =

Dutch judoka (born 1997)

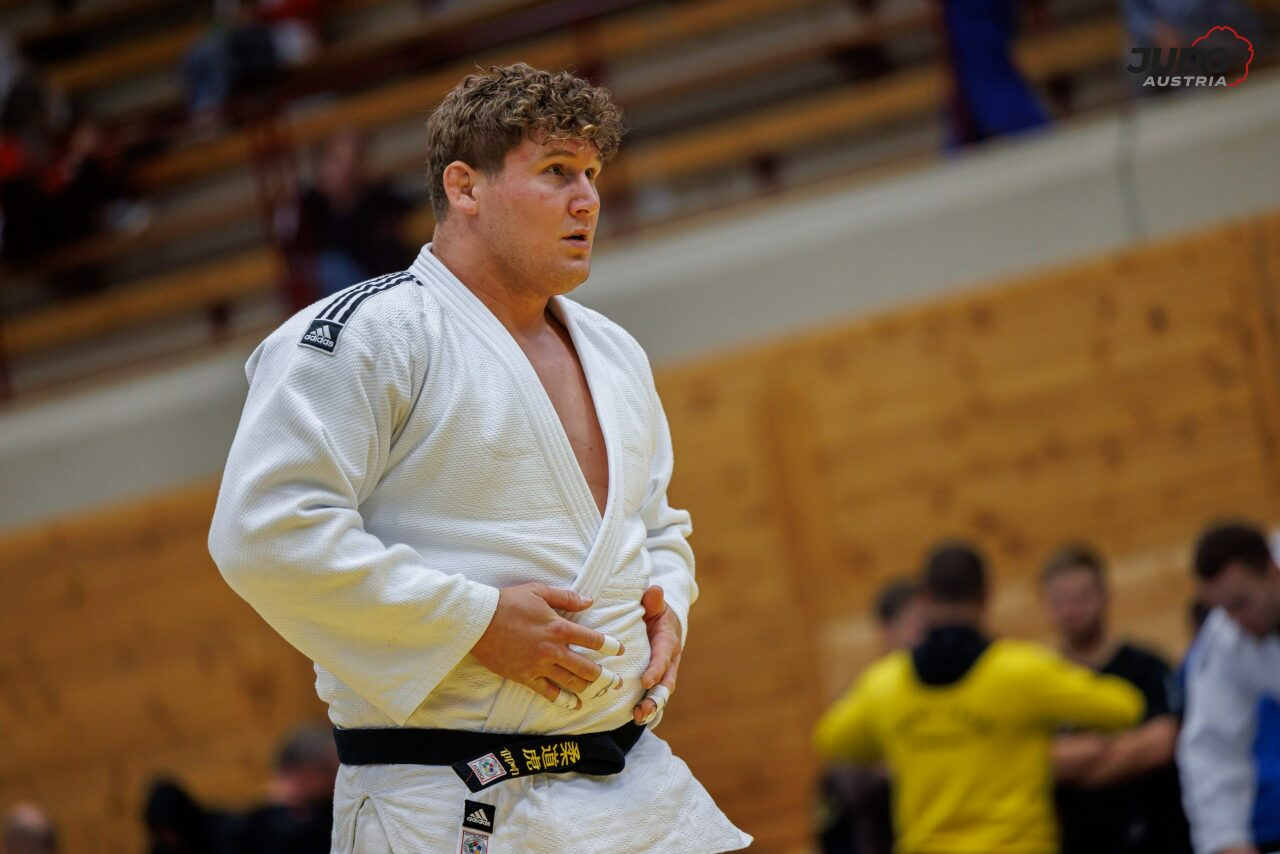
- Jur Spijkers (white) participates in the Austrian 1. Bundesliga 2022 for LZ Wels

Personal information
- Nationality: Dutch
- Born: 18 March 1997 (age 29) Tilburg, Netherlands
- Occupation: Judoka

Sport
- Country: Netherlands
- Sport: Judo
- Weight class: +100 kg
- Rank: 1st dan black belt

Achievements and titles
- World Champ.: 7th (2026)
- European Champ.: (gold) (2022)
Medal record
Men's judo
Representing the Netherlands
European Championships
Gold medal – first place	2022 Sofia	+100 kg
Silver medal – second place	2022 Mulhouse	Mixed team
IJF Grand Slam
Silver medal – second place	2022 Abu Dhabi	+100 kg
Bronze medal – third place	2021 Tel Aviv	+100 kg
Bronze medal – third place	2021 Paris	+100 kg
Bronze medal – third place	2024 Baku	+100 kg
Bronze medal – third place	2024 Astana	+100 kg
Bronze medal – third place	2025 Tbilisi	+100 kg
Bronze medal – third place	2026 Paris	+100 kg
Bronze medal – third place	2026 Tbilisi	+100 kg
Bronze medal – third place	2026 Ulaanbaatar	+100 kg
IJF Grand Prix
Gold medal – first place	2021 Zagreb	+100 kg
Gold medal – first place	2022 Zagreb	+100 kg
Silver medal – second place	2025 Zagreb	+100 kg
Silver medal – second place	2026 Linz	+100 kg
Bronze medal – third place	2018 Tbilisi	+100 kg
European U23 Championships
Silver medal – second place	2019 Izhevsk	+100 kg
Bronze medal – third place	2016 Tel Aviv	+100 kg
European Cadet Championships
Gold medal – first place	2014 Athens	+90 kg
Summer Universiade
Bronze medal – third place	2019 Naples	Open

Profile at external databases
- IJF: 13510
- JudoInside.com: 73237
- Updated on 10 October 2026

Jur Spijkers (born 18 March 1997) is a Dutch judoka.

Spijkers is a bronze medalist from the 2021 Judo Grand Slam Tel Aviv.

On 12 November 2022 Spijkers a silver medal at the 2022 European Mixed Team Judo Championships as part of team Netherlands.
