= Judo at the 2015 European Games – Men's +100 kg =

Judo competition

Judo Men's +100 kg at the 2015 European Games
- Venue: Heydar Aliyev Arena
- Location: Baku, Azerbaijan
- Date: 27 June
- Competitors: 24 from 21 nations

Medalists
gold medal	Adam Okruashvili (1st title)	Georgia
silver medal	Or Sasson	Israel
bronze medal	Renat Saidov	Russia
bronze medal	Iakiv Khammo	Ukraine

Competition at external databases
- Links: IJF • JudoInside

The men's +100 kg judo event at the 2015 European Games in Baku took place on 27 June.

== Results ==
=== Finals ===
Semi-finals
Marius Paškevičius (LTU)	000
Adam Okruashvili (GEO)	100
Renat Saidov (RUS)	001
Or Sasson (ISR)	100

Final
Adam Okruashvili (GEO)	100
Or Sasson (ISR)	000

=== Repechage ===
Repechage
André Breitbarth (GER)	000
Levani Matiashvili (GEO)	100

Third place
Levani Matiashvili (GEO)	000
Renat Saidov (RUS)	001

Repechage
Iakiv Khammo (UKR)	111
Roy Meyer (NED)	000

Third place
Iakiv Khammo (UKR)	013
Marius Paškevičius (LTU)	000

=== Pool A ===
First round
Harun Sadiković (BIH)	000
Marius Paškevičius (LTU)	101
Artūrs Ņikiforenko (LAT)	001
Oleksandr Gordiienko (UKR)	100

Round of 16
Barna Bor (HUN)	001
Marius Paškevičius (LTU)	010
André Breitbarth (GER)	110
Oleksandr Gordiienko (UKR)	000

Quarterfinals
Marius Paškevičius (LTU)	100
André Breitbarth (GER)	000

=== Pool B ===
First round
David Fernández (ESP)	000
Maciej Sarnacki (POL)	100
Ushangi Kokauri (AZE)	101
Matjaž Ceraj (SLO)	000

Round of 16
Adam Okruashvili (GEO)	100
Maciej Sarnacki (POL)	000
Levani Matiashvili (GEO)	100
Ushangi Kokauri (AZE)	000

Quarterfinals
Adam Okruashvili (GEO)	001
Levani Matiashvili (GEO)	000

=== Pool C ===
First round
Burak Serbest (TUR)	000
Božidar Božinić (SRB)	100
Benjamin Harmegnies (BEL)	000
Iakiv Khammo (UKR)	010

Round of 16
Renat Saidov (RUS)	100
Božidar Božinić (SRB)	000
Vlăduț Simionescu (ROU)	000
Iakiv Khammo (UKR)	110

Quarterfinals
Renat Saidov (RUS)	000
Iakiv Khammo (UKR)	000

=== Pool D ===
First round
Daniel Allerstorfer (AUT)	000
Juhan Mettis (EST)	100
Michal Horák (CZE)	000
Or Sasson (ISR)	001

Round of 16
Roy Meyer (NED)	000
Juhan Mettis (EST)	000
Daniel Natea (ROU)	000
Or Sasson (ISR)	100

Quarterfinals
Roy Meyer (NED)	000
Or Sasson (ISR)	100
