= 2015 World Judo Championships – Men's +100 kg =

Judo competition

Judo Men's +100 kg at the 2015 World Judo Championships
- Venue: Alau Ice Palace
- Location: Astana, Kazakhstan
- Date: 29 August
- Competitors: 42 from 38 nations
- Total prize money: 14,000$

Medalists
gold medal	Teddy Riner (7th title)	France
silver medal	Ryu Shichinohe	Japan
bronze medal	Adam Okruashvili	Georgia
bronze medal	Iakiv Khammo	Ukraine

Competition at external databases
- Links: IJF • JudoInside

The men's +100 kg competition of the 2015 World Judo Championships was held on 29 August 2015.

== Results ==
=== Finals ===
Semi-finals
(France) Teddy Riner	101
(South Korea) Kim Sung-Min	000
(Georgia (country)) Adam Okruashvili	000
(Japan) Ryu Shichinohe	100

Final
(France) Teddy Riner	011
(Japan) Ryu Shichinohe	000

=== Repechage ===
Repechage		Third place
(Germany) Andre Breibarth	100
(Hungary) Barna Bor	000	(Germany) Andre Breibarth	000
		(Georgia (country)) Adam Okruashvili	010

Repechage		Third place
(Germany) Sven Heinle	000
(Ukraine) Iakiv Khammo	101	(Ukraine) Iakiv Khammo	100
		(South Korea) Kim Sung-Min	000

=== Pool A ===
First Round
(Estonia) Juhan Mettis	100
(Turkmenistan) Kakajan Meredov	000
(Cuba) Alex García	110
(Ukraine) Oleksandr Gordiienko	000

Second Round
(France) Teddy Riner	100
(Estonia) Juhan Mettis	000
(Samoa) Derek Sua	000
(Kyrgyzstan) Iurii Krakovetskii	100
(Georgia (country)) Levani Matiashvili	000
(Cuba) Alex García	000
(Germany) Andre Breitbarth	100
(New Zealand) Sam Rosser	000

Third Round
(France) Teddy Riner	110
(Kyrgyzstan) Iurii Krakovetskii	000
(Cuba) Alex García	000
(Germany) Andre Breibarth	100

Quarterfinals
(France) Teddy Riner	111
(Germany) Andre Breibarth	000

=== Pool B ===
First Round
(Ecuador) Freddy Figueroa	101
(Latvia) Artūrs Ņikiforenko	000
(Egypt) Islam El Shehaby	101
(Tajikistan) Mukhamadmurod Abdurakhmonov	000
(Romania) Daniel Natea	100
(Saudi Arabia) Rashed Zaidan	000

Second Round
(Hungary) Barna Bor	003
(Ecuador) Freddy Figueroa	000
(Egypt) Islam El Shehaby	100
(Afghanistan) Mansour Sarwari	000
(Netherlands) Roy Meyer	000
(Romania) Daniel Natea	101
(Israel) Or Sasson	000
(South Korea) Kim Sung-min	101

Third Round
(Hungary) Barna Bor	100
(Egypt) Islam El Shehaby	001
(Romania) Daniel Natea	000
(South Korea) Kim Sung-Min	100

Quarterfinals
(Hungary) Barna Bor	000
(South Korea) Kim Sung-Min	110

=== Pool C ===
First Round
(Germany) Sven Heinle	000
(United States) Akbarzhan Iminov	000
(Nepal) Rajan Joshi	000
(Spain) David Fernández	100
(Australia) Jake Andrewartha	000
(Mexico) José Cuevas	100

Second Round
(Tunisia) Faicel Jaballah	000
(Germany) Sven Heinle	101
(Venezuela) Pedro Pineda	000
(Spain) David Fernández	000
(Georgia (country)) Adam Okruashvili	010
(Poland) Maciej Sarnacki	000
(Mexico) José Cuevas	000
(Czech Republic) Michal Horák	100

Third Round
(Germany) Sven Heinle	100
(Venezuela) Pedro Pineda	000
(Georgia (country)) Adam Okruashvili	110
(Czech Republic) Michal Horák	000

Quarterfinals
(Germany) Sven Heinle	000
(Georgia (country)) Adam Okruashvili	100

=== Pool D ===
First Round
(Morocco) El Mehdi Malki	000
(Ukraine) Iakiv Khammo	101
(Latvia) Vladimirs Osnačs	000
(Brazil) David Moura	100

Second Round
(Russia) Renat Saidov	000
(Ukraine) Iakiv Khammo	010
(Lithuania) Marius Paškevičius	000
(Uzbekistan) Abdullo Tangriev	002
(Japan) Ryu Shichinohe	000
(Brazil) David Moura	000
(Kazakhstan) Yerzhan Shynkeyev	000
(Austria) Daniel Allerstorfer	110

Third Round
(Ukraine) Iakiv Khammo	100
(Uzbekistan) Abdullo Tangriev	000
(Japan) Ryu Shichinohe	001
(Austria) Daniel Allerstorfer	000

Quarterfinals
(Ukraine) Iakiv Khammo	000
(Japan) Ryu Shichinohe	100

== Prize money ==
The sums listed bring the total prizes awarded to 14,000$ for the individual event.

Medal	Total	Judoka	Coach
Gold	6,000$	4,800$	1,200$
Silver	4,000$	3,200$	800$
Bronze	2,000$	1,600$	400$
