= 2014 World Judo Championships – Men's +100 kg =

Judo competition

Judo Men's +100 kg at the 2014 World Judo Championships
- Venue: Traktor Ice Arena
- Location: Chelyabinsk, Russia
- Date: 30 August 2014
- Competitors: 37 from 32 nations
- Total prize money: 14,000$

Medalists
gold medal	Teddy Riner (6th title)	France
silver medal	Ryu Shichinohe	Japan
bronze medal	Renat Saidov	Russia
bronze medal	Rafael Silva	Brazil

Competition at external databases
- Links: IJF • JudoInside

The men's +100 kg competition of the 2014 World Judo Championships was held on 30 August.

== Medalists ==
Gold	Silver	Bronze
Teddy Riner (FRA)	Ryu Shichinohe (JPN)	Renat Saidov (RUS); Rafael Silva (BRA)

== Results ==
=== Finals ===
Semi-finals
(Brazil) Rafael Silva	000
(France) Teddy Riner	100
(Japan) Ryu Shichinohe	100
(Brazil) David Moura	010

Final
(France) Teddy Riner	000
(Japan) Ryu Shichinohe	000

=== Repechage ===
Repechage		Third place
(Lithuania) Marius Paškevičius	000
(Russia) Renat Saidov	000	(Russia) Renat Saidov	100
		(Brazil) David Moura	000

Repechage		Third place
(Kyrgyzstan) Iurii Krakovetskii	000
(Netherlands) Roy Meyer	000	(Netherlands) Roy Meyer	000
		(Brazil) Rafael Silva	000

=== Pool A ===
First Round
(Germany) Andre Breitbarth	100
(Tajikistan) Mukhamadmurod Abdurakhmonov	000

Second Round
(Brazil) Rafael Silva	000
(Germany) Andre Breitbarth	000
(Romania) Vlăduț Simionescu	000
(Egypt) Islam El Shehaby	101
(Lithuania) Marius Paškevičius	100
(Georgia (country)) Levani Matiashvili	000
(China) Shen Zhuhong	000
(Latvia) Arturs Nikiforenko	100

Third Round
(Brazil) Rafael Silva	000
(Egypt) Islam El Shehaby	000
(Lithuania) Marius Paškevičius	100
(Latvia) Arturs Nikiforenko	000

Quarterfinals
(Brazil) Rafael Silva	010
(Lithuania) Marius Paškevičius	001

=== Pool B ===
First Round
(Turkmenistan) Hudayberdi Sahedov	000
(Algeria) Bilal Zouani	100

Second Round
(France) Teddy Riner	100
(Israel) Or Sasson	000
(Czech Republic) Michal Horák	101
(Australia) Jake Andrewartha	000
(Russia) Renat Saidov	100
(Algeria) Bilal Zouani	000
(Japan) Daiki Kamikawa	100
(Austria) Daniel Allerstorfer	000

Third Round
(France) Teddy Riner	100
(Czech Republic) Michal Horák	000
(Russia) Renat Saidov	010
(Japan) Daiki Kamikawa	000

Quarterfinals
(France) Teddy Riner	100
(Russia) Renat Saidov	000

=== Pool C ===
First Round
(Hungary) Barna Bor	000
(Uzbekistan) Abdullo Tangriev	010
(Venezuela) Pedro Pineda	000
(Cuba) Óscar Brayson	110

Second Round
(Tunisia) Faicel Jaballah	000
(Kyrgyzstan) Iurii Krakovetskii	110
(Uzbekistan) Abdullo Tangriev	101
(Romania) Daniel Natea	001
(Japan) Ryu Shichinohe	010
(Cuba) Óscar Brayson	000
(Kuwait) Husein Misri	000
(Poland) Maciej Sarnacki	100

Third Round
(Kyrgyzstan) Iurii Krakovetskii	001
(Uzbekistan) Abdullo Tangriev	000
(Japan) Ryu Shichinohe	100
(Poland) Maciej Sarnacki	000

Quarterfinals
(Kyrgyzstan) Iurii Krakovetskii	000
(Japan) Ryu Shichinohe	101

=== Pool D ===
First Round
(Mongolia) Temuulen Battulga	100
(China) Liu Jian	000

Second Round
(Georgia (country)) Adam Okruashvili	100
(Italy) Alessio Mascetti	000
(Estonia) Juhan Mettis	000
(Netherlands) Roy Meyer	100
(Brazil) David Moura	100
(Ukraine) Stanislav Bondarenko	000
(Pakistan) Ahmad Butt	000
(Mongolia) Temuulen Battulga	100

Third Round
(Georgia (country)) Adam Okruashvili	000
(Netherlands) Roy Meyer	011
(Brazil) David Moura	100
(Mongolia) Temuulen Battulga	010

Quarterfinals
(Netherlands) Roy Meyer	000
(Brazil) David Moura	000

== Prize money ==
The sums listed bring the total prizes awarded to $14,000 for the individual event.

Medal	Total	Judoka	Coach
Gold	$6,000	$4,800	$1,200
Silver	$4,000	$3,200	$800
Bronze	$2,000	$1,600	$400
