= 2016 European Judo Championships – Men's +100 kg =

Judo competition

Judo Men's +100 kg at the 2016 European Judo Championships
- Venue: TatNeft Arena
- Location: Kazan, Russia
- Date: 23 April
- Competitors: 24 from 21 nations

Medalists
gold medal	Teddy Riner (5th title)	France
silver medal	Or Sasson	Israel
bronze medal	Daniel Natea	Romania
bronze medal	Levani Matiashvili	Georgia

Competition at external databases
- Links: IJF • JudoInside

The men's +100 kg competition at the 2016 European Judo Championships was held on 23 April at the TatNeft Arena in Kazan, Russia.

== Results ==
=== Finals ===
Semi-finals
Teddy Riner (FRA)	10
Levani Matiashvili (GEO)	00
Daniel Natea (ROU)	00
Or Sasson (ISR)	10

Final
Teddy Riner (FRA)	10
Or Sasson (ISR)	00

=== Repechage ===
Repechage
André Breitbarth (GER)	00
Oleksandr Gordiienko (UKR)	11

Third place
Oleksandr Gordiienko (UKR)	00
Daniel Natea (ROU)	10

Repechage
Barna Bor (HUN)	10
Juhan Mettis (EST)	00

Third place
Barna Bor (HUN)	00
Levani Matiashvili (GEO)	00

=== Pool A ===
First round
Aliaksandr Vakhaviak (BLR)	10
Benjamin Harmegnies (BEL)	00
Þormóður Árni Jónsson (ISL)	00
Michal Horák (CZE)	10

Round of 16
Teddy Riner (FRA)	10
Aliaksandr Vakhaviak (BLR)	00
André Breitbarth (GER)	01
Michal Horák (CZE)	00

Quarterfinals
Teddy Riner (FRA)	10
André Breitbarth (GER)	00

=== Pool B ===
First round
Andrey Volkov (RUS)	00
Oleksandr Gordiienko (UKR)	00
Harun Sadiković (BIH)	00
Žarko Ćulum (SRB)	10

Round of 16
Adam Okruashvili (GEO)	00
Oleksandr Gordiienko (UKR)	10
Levani Matiashvili (GEO)	00
Žarko Ćulum (SRB)	00

Quarterfinals
Oleksandr Gordiienko (UKR)	00
Levani Matiashvili (GEO)	11

=== Pool C ===
First round
Maciej Sarnacki (POL)	10
Stanislav Bondarenko (UKR)	00
Dimitrios Tsoumitas (GRE)
Daniel Allerstorfer (AUT)	00

Round of 16
Barna Bor (HUN)	10
Maciej Sarnacki (POL)	00
Daniel Natea (ROU)	10
Daniel Allerstorfer (AUT)	00

Quarterfinals
Barna Bor (HUN)	00
Daniel Natea (ROU)	01

=== Pool D ===
First round
Sven Heinle (GER)	00
Juhan Mettis (EST)	11
Ushangi Kokauri (AZE)	10
Marius Paškevičius (LTU)	00

Round of 16
Roy Meyer (NED)	00
Juhan Mettis (EST)	11
Or Sasson (ISR)	01
Ushangi Kokauri (AZE)	00

Quarterfinals
Juhan Mettis (EST)	00
Or Sasson (ISR)	11
