= 2010 European U23 Judo Championships =

Judo competition

Judo 2010 European U23 Judo Championships
- Location: Sarajevo, Bosnia and Herzegovina
- Dates: 19–21 November 2010

Competition at external databases
- Links: JudoInside

The 2010 European U23 Judo Championships is an edition of the European U23 Judo Championships, organised by the European Judo Union. It was held in Sarajevo, Bosnia and Herzegovina from 19 to 21 November 2010.

== Medal summary ==
=== Medal table ===
* Host nation (Bosnia and Herzegovina)

| Rank | Nation | Gold | Silver | Bronze | Total |
|---|---|---|---|---|---|
| 1 | Germany (GER) | 4 | 2 | 1 | 7 |
| 2 | Russia (RUS) | 2 | 3 | 2 | 7 |
| 3 | Hungary (HUN) | 2 | 1 | 0 | 3 |
| 4 | Belgium (BEL) | 1 | 0 | 2 | 3 |
| 4 | Italy (ITA) | 1 | 0 | 2 | 3 |
| 6 | Great Britain (GBR) | 1 | 0 | 1 | 2 |
| 6 | Romania (ROU) | 1 | 0 | 1 | 2 |
| 6 | Turkey (TUR) | 1 | 0 | 1 | 2 |
| 9 | Switzerland (SUI) | 1 | 0 | 0 | 1 |
| 10 | Poland (POL) | 0 | 3 | 1 | 4 |
| 11 | Netherlands (NED) | 0 | 1 | 1 | 2 |
| 11 | Serbia (SRB) | 0 | 1 | 1 | 2 |
| 13 | Bosnia and Herzegovina (BIH)* | 0 | 1 | 0 | 1 |
| 13 | Estonia (EST) | 0 | 1 | 0 | 1 |
| 13 | Slovenia (SLO) | 0 | 1 | 0 | 1 |
| 16 | France (FRA) | 0 | 0 | 3 | 3 |
| 16 | Ukraine (UKR) | 0 | 0 | 3 | 3 |
| 18 | Azerbaijan (AZE) | 0 | 0 | 1 | 1 |
| 18 | Belarus (BLR) | 0 | 0 | 1 | 1 |
| 18 | Bulgaria (BUL) | 0 | 0 | 1 | 1 |
| 18 | Czech Republic (CZE) | 0 | 0 | 1 | 1 |
| 18 | Latvia (LAT) | 0 | 0 | 1 | 1 |
| 18 | Moldova (MDA) | 0 | 0 | 1 | 1 |
| 18 | Portugal (POR) | 0 | 0 | 1 | 1 |
| 18 | Spain (ESP) | 0 | 0 | 1 | 1 |
| 18 | Sweden (SWE) | 0 | 0 | 1 | 1 |
| Totals (26 entries) | | 14 | 14 | 28 | 56 |

=== Men's events ===
| Event | Gold | Silver | Bronze |
|---|---|---|---|
| Extra-lightweight (−60 kg) | Ashley McKenzie (GBR) | Robert Mshvidobadze (RUS) | Ilgar Mushkiyev (AZE) |
| Extra-lightweight (−60 kg) | Ashley McKenzie (GBR) | Robert Mshvidobadze (RUS) | Olle Sundstrom (SWE) |
| Half-lightweight (−66 kg) | Denis Lavrentiev (RUS) | Andraz Jereb (SLO) | Tomasz Kowalski (POL) |
| Half-lightweight (−66 kg) | Denis Lavrentiev (RUS) | Andraz Jereb (SLO) | Victor Scvortov (MDA) |
| Lightweight (−73 kg) | Attila Ungvári (HUN) | Soshin Katsumi (GER) | André Alves (POR) |
| Lightweight (−73 kg) | Attila Ungvári (HUN) | Soshin Katsumi (GER) | Denis Iartsev (RUS) |
| Half-middleweight (−81 kg) | Murat Khabachirov (RUS) | Szabolcs Krizsán (HUN) | Joachim Bottieau (BEL) |
| Half-middleweight (−81 kg) | Murat Khabachirov (RUS) | Szabolcs Krizsán (HUN) | Aleksandar Kukolj (SRB) |
| Middleweight (−90 kg) | Aaron Hildebrand (GER) | Azamat Sitimov (RUS) | Michal Krpálek (CZE) |
| Middleweight (−90 kg) | Aaron Hildebrand (GER) | Azamat Sitimov (RUS) | Anthony Laignes (FRA) |
| Half-heavyweight (−100 kg) | Dino Pfeiffer (GER) | Tomasz Domanski (POL) | Feyyaz Yazıcı (TUR) |
| Half-heavyweight (−100 kg) | Dino Pfeiffer (GER) | Tomasz Domanski (POL) | Razmik Tonoyan (UKR) |
| Heavyweight (+100 kg) | André Breitbarth (GER) | Juhan Mettis (EST) | Renat Saidov (RUS) |
| Heavyweight (+100 kg) | André Breitbarth (GER) | Juhan Mettis (EST) | Domenico Di Guida (ITA) |

=== Women's events ===
| Event | Gold | Silver | Bronze |
|---|---|---|---|
| Extra-lightweight (−48 kg) | Amelie Rosseneu (BEL) | Birgit Ente (NED) | Maryna Cherniak (UKR) |
| Extra-lightweight (−48 kg) | Amelie Rosseneu (BEL) | Birgit Ente (NED) | Violeta Dumitru (ROU) |
| Half-lightweight (−52 kg) | Tuğba Zehir (TUR) | Marta Kuban (POL) | Laura Holtzinger (FRA) |
| Half-lightweight (−52 kg) | Tuğba Zehir (TUR) | Marta Kuban (POL) | Hanne Van Bossele (BEL) |
| Lightweight (−57 kg) | Andreea Chițu (ROU) | Jovana Rogić (SRB) | Gemma Howell (GBR) |
| Lightweight (−57 kg) | Andreea Chițu (ROU) | Jovana Rogić (SRB) | Hélène Receveaux (FRA) |
| Half-middleweight (−63 kg) | Edwige Gwend (ITA) | Anna Shcherbakova (RUS) | Martyna Trajdos (GER) |
| Half-middleweight (−63 kg) | Edwige Gwend (ITA) | Anna Shcherbakova (RUS) | Ivelina Ilieva (BUL) |
| Middleweight (−70 kg) | Stephanie Egger (SUI) | Laura Vargas Koch (GER) | María Bernabéu (ESP) |
| Middleweight (−70 kg) | Stephanie Egger (SUI) | Laura Vargas Koch (GER) | Evija Pukite (LAT) |
| Half-heavyweight (−78 kg) | Abigél Joó (HUN) | Daria Pogorzelec (POL) | Iris Lemmen (NED) |
| Half-heavyweight (−78 kg) | Abigél Joó (HUN) | Daria Pogorzelec (POL) | Ivanna Makukha (UKR) |
| Heavyweight (+78 kg) | Kristin Buessow (GER) | Larisa Cerić (BIH) | Maryna Slutskaya (BLR) |
| Heavyweight (+78 kg) | Kristin Buessow (GER) | Larisa Cerić (BIH) | Lucia Tangorre (ITA) |

Source Results
