= Battulgyn Temüülen =

Mongolian judoka (born 1989)

Battulgyn Temuulen
Personal information
- Native name: Баттулгын Тэмүүлэн
- Nationality: Mongolia
- Born: 10 July 1989 (age 36) Malchin, Uvs, Mongolia
- Occupation: Judoka
- Height: 183 cm (6 ft 0 in)

Sport
- Country: Mongolia
- Sport: Judo
- Weight class: –100 kg, +100 kg

Achievements and titles
- Olympic Games: R32 (2016)
- World Champ.: 7th (2009)
- Asian Champ.: (bronze) (2009, 2012, 2013)
Medal record
Men's judo
Representing Mongolia
World Championships
Bronze medal – third place	2015 Astana	Men's team
Asian Championships
Bronze medal – third place	2009 Taipei	–100 kg
Bronze medal – third place	2012 Tashkent	–100 kg
Bronze medal – third place	2013 Bangkok	–100 kg
World Masters
Bronze medal – third place	2011 Baku	–100 kg
IJF Grand Slam
Silver medal – second place	2012 Moscow	–100 kg
Silver medal – second place	2013 Paris	–100 kg
Bronze medal – third place	2012 Paris	–100 kg
Bronze medal – third place	2012 Tokyo	–100 kg
Bronze medal – third place	2017 Ekaterinburg	+100 kg
IJF Grand Prix
Gold medal – first place	2014 Tashkent	+100 kg
Gold medal – first place	2016 Ulaanbaatar	+100 kg
Silver medal – second place	2010 Qingdao	–100 kg
Silver medal – second place	2015 Tashkent	+100 kg
Bronze medal – third place	2015 Ulaanbaatar	+100 kg
World Juniors Championships
Bronze medal – third place	2008 Bangkok	–100 kg

Profile at external databases
- IJF: 225
- JudoInside.com: 52930
- Updated on 20 November 2022

Battulgyn Temüülen (born 10 July 1989) is a Mongolian judoka. He competed at the 2016 Summer Olympics in the men's +100 kg event, in which he was eliminated in the first round by Mohamed-Amine Tayeb. He was the flag bearer for Mongolia at the Parade of Nations.
