= 2011 European Junior Judo Championships =

Judo competition

Judo 2011 European Junior Judo Championships
- Location: Lommel, Belgium
- Dates: 16–18 September 2011

Competition at external databases
- Links: EJU • JudoInside

The 2011 European Junior Judo Championships is an edition of the European Junior Judo Championships, organised by the European Judo Union.It was held in Lommel, Belgium from 16 to 18 September 2011.

== Medal summary ==
=== Medal table ===
* Host nation (Belgium)

| Rank | Nation | Gold | Silver | Bronze | Total |
|---|---|---|---|---|---|
| 1 | Russia (RUS) | 3 | 1 | 6 | 10 |
| 2 | Turkey (TUR) | 2 | 1 | 1 | 4 |
| 3 | Ukraine (UKR) | 2 | 0 | 1 | 3 |
| 4 | Armenia (ARM) | 2 | 0 | 0 | 2 |
| 4 | Austria (AUT) | 2 | 0 | 0 | 2 |
| 6 | Netherlands (NED) | 1 | 3 | 1 | 5 |
| 7 | France (FRA) | 1 | 2 | 3 | 6 |
| 7 | Germany (GER) | 1 | 2 | 3 | 6 |
| 9 | Georgia (GEO) | 1 | 2 | 1 | 4 |
| 10 | Italy (ITA) | 1 | 0 | 2 | 3 |
| 11 | Slovenia (SLO) | 0 | 1 | 2 | 3 |
| 12 | Israel (ISR) | 0 | 1 | 1 | 2 |
| 12 | Switzerland (SUI) | 0 | 1 | 1 | 2 |
| 14 | Great Britain (GBR) | 0 | 1 | 0 | 1 |
| 14 | Spain (ESP) | 0 | 1 | 0 | 1 |
| 16 | Poland (POL) | 0 | 0 | 3 | 3 |
| 17 | Belgium (BEL)* | 0 | 0 | 2 | 2 |
| 18 | Azerbaijan (AZE) | 0 | 0 | 1 | 1 |
| 18 | Belarus (BLR) | 0 | 0 | 1 | 1 |
| 18 | Croatia (CRO) | 0 | 0 | 1 | 1 |
| 18 | Hungary (HUN) | 0 | 0 | 1 | 1 |
| 18 | Sweden (SWE) | 0 | 0 | 1 | 1 |
| Totals (22 entries) | | 16 | 16 | 32 | 64 |

=== Men's events ===
| Event | Gold | Silver | Bronze |
|---|---|---|---|
| −55 kg | Garik Harutyunyan (ARM) | Leri Chelidze (GEO) | Sakhavat Gadzhiev (RUS) |
| −55 kg | Garik Harutyunyan (ARM) | Leri Chelidze (GEO) | Oruj Valizada (AZE) |
| −60 kg | Gor Harutyunyan (ARM) | Vincent Limare (FRA) | Aram Grigoryan (RUS) |
| −60 kg | Gor Harutyunyan (ARM) | Vincent Limare (FRA) | Kevin Schuchardt (GER) |
| −66 kg | Lasha Shavdatuashvili (GEO) | Andraz Jereb (SLO) | Anton Chetveryk (UKR) |
| −66 kg | Lasha Shavdatuashvili (GEO) | Andraz Jereb (SLO) | Enrico Parlati (ITA) |
| −73 kg | Rufat Magomedov (UKR) | Max Stewart (GBR) | Mikheil Chokheli (GEO) |
| −73 kg | Rufat Magomedov (UKR) | Max Stewart (GBR) | Sagi Muki (ISR) |
| −81 kg | Khasan Khalmurzaev (RUS) | Max Muensterberg (GER) | Albert Kostoev (RUS) |
| −81 kg | Khasan Khalmurzaev (RUS) | Max Muensterberg (GER) | Krisztián Tóth (HUN) |
| −90 kg | Khusen Khalmurzaev (RUS) | Peter Paltchik (ISR) | Jakub Zarzeczny (POL) |
| −90 kg | Khusen Khalmurzaev (RUS) | Peter Paltchik (ISR) | Mihael Žgank (SLO) |
| −100 kg | Domenico Di Guida (ITA) | Feyyaz Yazıcı (TUR) | Toma Nikiforov (BEL) |
| −100 kg | Domenico Di Guida (ITA) | Feyyaz Yazıcı (TUR) | Ismail Urusov (RUS) |
| +100 kg | Daniel Allerstorfer (AUT) | Levani Matiashvili (GEO) | Sven Heinle (GER) |
| +100 kg | Daniel Allerstorfer (AUT) | Levani Matiashvili (GEO) | Damian Nasiadko (POL) |

=== Women's events ===
| Event | Gold | Silver | Bronze |
|---|---|---|---|
| −44 kg | Evgenia Demintseva (RUS) | Cristina Casas (ESP) | Irina Mora-Hernandez (GER) |
| −44 kg | Evgenia Demintseva (RUS) | Cristina Casas (ESP) | Vita Valnova (BLR) |
| −48 kg | Ebru Sahin (TUR) | Mélanie Clément (FRA) | Alesya Kuznetsova (RUS) |
| −48 kg | Ebru Sahin (TUR) | Mélanie Clément (FRA) | Louise Raynaud (FRA) |
| −52 kg | Oleksandra Starkova (UKR) | Kathrin Frey (SUI) | Greta Poser (ITA) |
| −52 kg | Oleksandra Starkova (UKR) | Kathrin Frey (SUI) | Julia Rosso (FRA) |
| −57 kg | Tuğba Zehir (TUR) | Sanne Verhagen (NED) | Fabienne Kocher (SUI) |
| −57 kg | Tuğba Zehir (TUR) | Sanne Verhagen (NED) | Emma Barkeling (SWE) |
| −63 kg | Margaux Pinot (FRA) | Jaime-Lee Leonora (NED) | Büşra Katipoğlu (TUR) |
| −63 kg | Margaux Pinot (FRA) | Jaime-Lee Leonora (NED) | Halima Mohamed-Seghir (POL) |
| −70 kg | Bernadette Graf (AUT) | Nicoline Alberts (NED) | Lola Mansour (BEL) |
| −70 kg | Bernadette Graf (AUT) | Nicoline Alberts (NED) | Barbara Matić (CRO) |
| −78 kg | Guusje Steenhuis (NED) | Alena Prokopenko (RUS) | Urska Gracner (SLO) |
| −78 kg | Guusje Steenhuis (NED) | Alena Prokopenko (RUS) | Madeleine Malonga (FRA) |
| +78 kg | Carolin Weiß (GER) | Zita Notter (GER) | Aleksandra Babintseva (RUS) |
| +78 kg | Carolin Weiß (GER) | Zita Notter (GER) | Tessie Savelkouls (NED) |

Source Results
