= Judo at the 2016 Summer Olympics – Men's +100 kg =

Men's +100 kg at the Games of the XXXI Olympiad
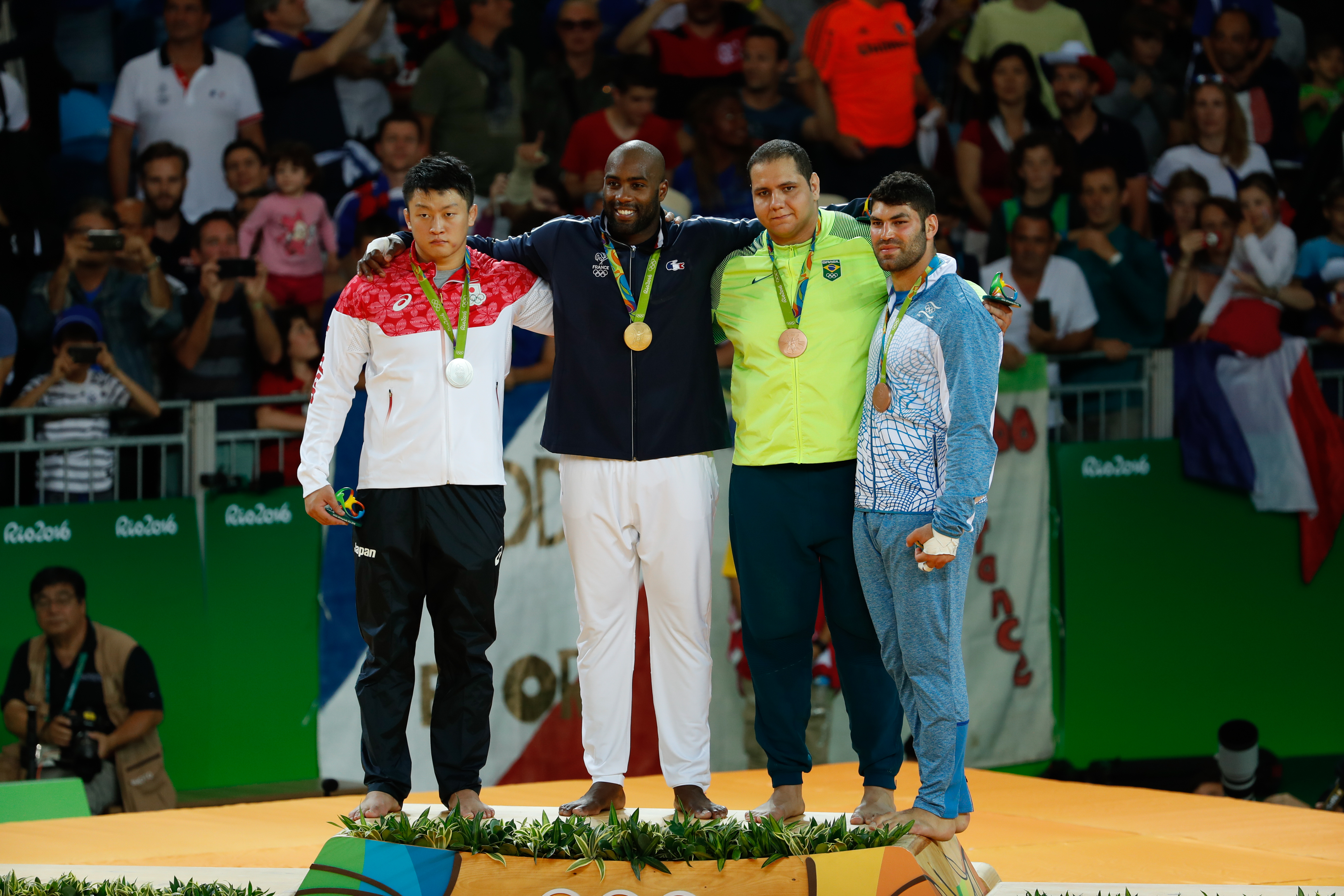
- Medalists
- Venue: Carioca Arena 2
- Date: 12 August 2016
- Competitors: 31 from 31 nations

Medalists
1st place, gold medalist(s)		Teddy Riner	France
2nd place, silver medalist(s)		Hisayoshi Harasawa	Japan
3rd place, bronze medalist(s)		Rafael Silva	Brazil
3rd place, bronze medalist(s)		Or Sasson	Israel

The men's +100 kg competition in judo at the 2016 Summer Olympics in Rio de Janeiro was held on 12 August at the Carioca Arena 2.

The gold and silver medals were determined by a single-elimination tournament, with the winner of the final taking gold and the loser receiving silver. Judo events awarded two bronze medals. Quarterfinal losers competed in a repechage match for the right to face a semifinal loser for a bronze medal (that is, the judokas defeated in quarterfinals A and B competed against each other, with the winner of that match facing the semifinal loser from the other half of the bracket).

The medals for the competition were presented by René Fasel, Switzerland, member of the International Olympic Committee and the gifts were presented by Jean-Luc Rouge, International Judo Federation secretary-general.

At the competition, in the first round Egyptian judoka Islam El Shahaby refused to shake the hand of Israeli judoka Or Sasson, the eventual bronze medalist, who had defeated El Shahaby. In August 2016 the Disciplinary Committee of the International Olympic Committee issued a "severe reprimand" to El Shehaby for behavior violating "the rules of fair play and against the spirit of friendship embodied in the Olympic Values", and requested that the Egyptian Olympic Committee in the future make certain that all Egyptian athletes are properly educated as to the Olympic Values before they participate in the Olympic Games.

== Results ==
=== Finals ===
Semi-finals
Teddy Riner (FRA)	010
Or Sasson (ISR)	000
Hisayoshi Harasawa (JPN)	101
Abdullo Tangriev (UZB)	000

Final
Teddy Riner (FRA)	000
Hisayoshi Harasawa (JPN)	000

=== Repechages ===
Repechage		Bronze medal
Rafael Silva (BRA)	000
Roy Meyer (NED)	000	Rafael Silva (BRA)	001
		Abdullo Tangriev (UZB)	000

Repechage		Bronze medal
Alex García Mendoza (CUB)	100
Iurii Krakovetskii (KGZ)	000	Alex García Mendoza (CUB)	000
		Or Sasson (ISR)	000

=== Pool A ===
First round		Second round		Quarterfinals
		Teddy Riner (FRA)	100
Temuulengiin Battulga (MGL)	000	Mohamed-Amine Tayeb (ALG)	000
Mohamed-Amine Tayeb (ALG)	010			Teddy Riner (FRA)	010
Rafael Silva (BRA)	110			Rafael Silva (BRA)	000
Ramón Pileta (HON)	000	Rafael Silva (BRA)	100
Daniel Allerstorfer (AUT)	000	Renat Saidov (RUS)	000
Renat Saidov (RUS)	001

=== Pool B ===
First round		Second round		Quarterfinals
Roy Meyer (NED)	100
Deo Gracia Ngokaba (CGO)	000	Roy Meyer (NED)	101
Kim Sung-min (KOR)	102	Kim Sung-min (KOR)	000
Freddy Figueroa (ECU)	000			Roy Meyer (NED)	000
Or Sasson (ISR)	100			Or Sasson (ISR)	010
Islam El Shehaby (EGY)	000	Or Sasson (ISR)	010
Þormóður Árni Jónsson (ISL)	000	Maciej Sarnacki (POL)	000
Maciej Sarnacki (POL)	100

=== Pool C ===
First round		Second round		Quarterfinals
Hisayoshi Harasawa (JPN)	000
Adam Okruashvili (GEO)	000	Hisayoshi Harasawa (JPN)	100
Ushangi Kokauri (AZE)	111	Ushangi Kokauri (AZE)	000
Artūrs Ņikiforenko (LAT)	000			Hisayoshi Harasawa (JPN)	100
Barna Bor (HUN)	101			Alex García Mendoza (CUB)	000
Faicel Jaballah (TUN)	000	Barna Bor (HUN)	000
Alex García Mendoza (CUB)	100	Alex García Mendoza (CUB)	000
Mukhamadmurod Abdurakhmonov (TJK)	000

=== Pool D ===
First round		Second round		Quarterfinals
Yakiv Khammo (UKR)	100
Rachid Sidibe (BUR)	000	Yakiv Khammo (UKR)	000
Iurii Krakovetskii (KGZ)	100	Iurii Krakovetskii (KGZ)	111
André Breitbarth (GER)	000			Iurii Krakovetskii (KGZ)	001
Daniel Natea (ROU)	100			Abdullo Tangriev (UZB)	100
Kunathip Yea-on (THA)	000	Daniel Natea (ROU)	000
Derek Sua (SAM)	000	Abdullo Tangriev (UZB)	110
Abdullo Tangriev (UZB)	100
