= Aliaksandr Vakhaviak =

Belarusian judoka (born 1987)

Personal information
- Born: 25 December 1987 (age 38)
- Occupation: Judoka

Sport
- Country: Belarus
- Sport: Judo
- Weight class: +100 kg

Achievements and titles
- World Champ.: R16 (2013, 2017)
- European Champ.: R16 (2011, 2013, 2016, 2018, 2021)
Medal record
Men's judo
Representing Belarus
IJF Grand Slam
Silver medal – second place	2016 Abu Dhabi	+100 kg
Bronze medal – third place	2018 Paris	+100 kg
IJF Grand Prix
Gold medal – first place	2013 Almaty	+100 kg
Silver medal – second place	2019 Tbilisi	+100 kg
Bronze medal – third place	2016 Tashkent	+100 kg
Bronze medal – third place	2019 Tel Aviv	+100 kg
European Junior Championships
Bronze medal – third place	2006 Tallinn	+100 kg

Profile at external databases
- IJF: 4171
- JudoInside.com: 30172
- Updated on 21 May 2023

Aliaksandr Vakhaviak (born 25 December 1987) is a Belarusian judoka.

Vakhaviak is the gold medalist from the 2013 Judo Grand Prix Almaty.
