= Or Sasson =

Israeli judo practitioner (born 1990)

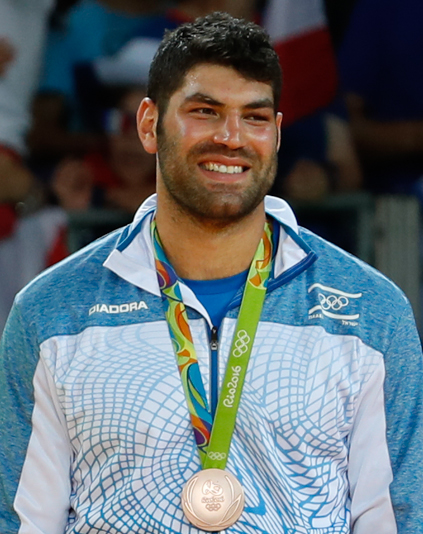
- Sasson at the 2016 Summer Olympics

Personal information
- Native name: אור ששון
- Nickname: Ori Sasson
- Nationality: Israeli
- Born: 18 August 1990 (age 36) Jerusalem
- Education: Ruppin College
- Occupation: Judoka
- Height: 193 cm (6 ft 4 in)
- Weight: 124 kg (273 lb)

Sport
- Country: Israel
- Sport: Judo
- Weight class: +100 kg
- Rank: 6th dan black belt
- Club: Meitav Jerusalem
- Coached by: Gil Ofer, Oren Smadja
- Retired: 12 May 2022

Achievements and titles
- Olympic Games: (bronze) (2016)
- World Champ.: R32 (2014, 2015, 2018, 2019)
- European Champ.: (silver) (2015, 2016)
- Highest world ranking: 3^{rd} (2016)
Medal record
Men's judo
Representing Israel
Olympic Games
Bronze medal – third place	2016 Rio de Janeiro	+100 kg
Bronze medal – third place	2020 Tokyo	Mixed team
European Games
Silver medal – second place	2015 Baku	+100 kg
European Championships
Silver medal – second place	2016 Kazan	+100 kg
World Masters
Silver medal – second place	2016 Guadalajara	+100 kg
IJF Grand Slam
Silver medal – second place	2016 Paris	+100 kg
Silver medal – second place	2019 Ekaterinburg	+100 kg
Bronze medal – third place	2017 Abu Dhabi	+100 kg
IJF Grand Prix
Gold medal – first place	2016 Tbilisi	+100 kg
Gold medal – first place	2017 Tashkent	+100 kg
Gold medal – first place	2019 Tel Aviv	+100 kg
Gold medal – first place	2019 Budapest	+100 kg
Gold medal – first place	2020 Tel Aviv	+100 kg
Silver medal – second place	2018 Zagreb	+100 kg
Bronze medal – third place	2011 Amsterdam	‍–‍100 kg
Bronze medal – third place	2013 Ulaanbaatar	‍–‍100 kg
Bronze medal – third place	2014 Zagreb	+100 kg
Bronze medal – third place	2015 Düsseldorf	+100 kg
Maccabiah Games
Gold medal – first place	2009 Tel Aviv	‍–‍100 kg

Profile at external databases
- IJF: 3278
- JudoInside.com: 58892
- Updated on 4 May 2025

Or "Ori" Sasson (Hebrew: אור "אורי" ששון; born 18 August 1990) is a retired Israeli Olympic judoka. He won a bronze medal in the +100 kg category at the 2016 Summer Olympics and another one at the mixed team event at the 2020 Summer Olympics. He was the second Israeli to win two Olympic medals.

In June 2015, representing Israel at the 2015 European Games in judo in the +100 kg category in Baku, Azerbaijan, Sasson won a silver medal at the 2015 European Championships which was held during the European Games.

== Early and personal life ==
Sasson was born in Jerusalem, to a family of Kurdish Jewish descent. His parents are Varda and Haim Sasson. He is the younger brother of former judoka and Israel national judo team captain Alon Sasson, who, when they were children, would hit him to show him who was boss.

He resides in Netanya, Israel, and studies business administration at Ruppin Academic Center College in Hefer Valley, Israel. Sasson is a fan of basketball and basketball team Hapoel Jerusalem B.C.

In 2020, Sasson competed in the Israeli version of The Masked Singer reality singing show, hiding in full-body falafel sandwich costume, and finished third.

In 2024, Sasson competed in the 10th season of Israel's Rokdim Im Kokhavim ('Dancing with the Stars'), where he was eliminated as the 5th couple out of 21, before reaching the live show stage.

== Judo career ==
Sasson started training in judo when he was eight years old. His coaches were Gil Ofer and Oren Smadja, his club was Meitav Jerusalem, and he started competing in 2005. He has worked with Noam Eyal, a sports psychologist who works for the Olympic Committee of Israel. Sasson won the Israeli judo championship at ‍–‍100 kg in 2007–09 and 2011, and at +100 kg in 2011 and 2012.

In July 2009 Sasson won the gold medal at the 2009 Maccabiah Games in Tel Aviv, Israel, in judo at ‍–‍100 kg. In September 2011 he competed in the Judo World Cup in Tashkent, Uzbekistan, where Iranian Javad Mahjoub was slated to face him, but refused.

In February 2012, he won a gold medal in the World Cup Prague in judo at +100 kg. In February 2013 and the following month, Sasson won gold medals in the European Open Tbilisi, Georgia and the European Open Warsaw at ‍–‍100 kg. In September 2014, he won a gold medal at the European Open Tallinn in Estonia at +100 kg, as he weighed approximately 115 kg and returned from surgery on an injured thumb.

On 26 June, representing Israel at the 2015 European Games in judo in the +100 kg category (while weighing 120 kg) in Baku, Azerbaijan, Sasson won a silver medal for Israel in the inaugural European Games, and in doing so won the silver medal in the 2015 European Championships. He lost to 159 kg Adam Okruashvili of Georgia in the final.

Sasson won the silver medal at the 2016 European Championships.

=== Rio Olympics ===
At the 2016 Summer Olympics, Sasson faced against Egyptian judoka Islam El Shehaby in the first round. When the match ended, Sasson tried to shake his opponent's hand, but El Shahaby refused—to loud boos and jeers from the near-capacity crowd for El Shahaby's behavior. El Shahaby later announced that he was retiring from judo.

Sasson then defeated Polish judoka Maciej Sarnacki, defeated Dutch judoka Roy Meyer, and overcame Cuban judoka Alex García Mendoza. His only loss was in the semi-finals against the eventual gold medal winner French judoka Teddy Riner.

Sasson was awarded the Olympic bronze medal at Judo +100 kg.

=== After Rio ===
Sasson took part in the torch lighting ceremony at the 2017 Maccabiah Games on 6 July 2017.

On 8 October, Sasson competed at the 2017 Tashkent Grand Prix, his first competition since the 2016 Olympics, and won the gold medal. On 28 October, he won the bronze medal at the 2017 Abu Dhabi Grand Slam after he defeated Benjamin Harmegnies of Belgium by waza-ari.

Sasson won the silver medal in the 2018 Zagreb Grand Prix, the gold medal at the 2019 Tel Aviv Grand Prix, the silver medal at the 2019 Ekaterinburg Grand Slam and the gold medal at the 2019 Budapest Grand Prix.

Sasson represents Israel at the 2020 Summer Olympics, competing at the men's +100 kg weight category. Sasson was drawn directly into the second round, where he again met Rinner, the only judoka to beat him in the last Olympics. Much like in 2016, the ten-time world champion and two-time Olympic champion Frenchman beat Sasson by a waza-ari, this time eliminating him from the individual competition.

On 31 July 2020 at the mixed team event, Sasson won his second Olympic bronze medal as part of the Israel national judo mixed team.

== Achievements ==
Year	Tournament	Place	Weight class	Ref.
2009	Maccabiah Games	Gold	−100 kg	
2011	Grand Prix Amsterdam	Bronze	−100 kg	
2013	Grand Prix Ulaanbaatar	Bronze	−100 kg	
2013	European Championships	5th	−100 kg	
2014	Grand Prix Zagreb	Bronze	+100 kg	
2015	Grand Prix Düsseldorf	Bronze	+100 kg	
2015	European Games	Silver	+100 kg	
2016	Grand Slam Paris	Silver	+100 kg	
2016	Grand Prix Tbilisi	Silver	+100 kg	
2016	European Championships	Silver	+100 kg	
2016	World Masters	Silver	+100 kg	
2016	Summer Olympics	Bronze	+100 kg	
2017	Grand Prix Tashkent	Gold	+100 kg	
2017	Grand Slam Abu Dhabi	Bronze	+100 kg	
2018	Grand Prix Zagreb	Silver	+100 kg	
2019	Grand Prix Tel Aviv	Gold	+100 kg	
2019	Grand Slam Ekaterinburg	Silver	+100 kg	
2019	Grand Prix Budapest	Gold	+100 kg	
2020	Grand Prix Tel Aviv	Gold	+100 kg	

== See also ==
- List of select Jewish judokas
- List of Jewish Olympic medalists
- List of Israelis
