= 2016 Judo Grand Slam Abu Dhabi =

Judo competition

Judo 2016 Judo Grand Slam Abu Dhabi
- Venue: IPIC Arena, Abu Dhabi
- Location: Abu Dhabi, United Arab Emirates
- Dates: 28–30 October 2016
- Competitors: 157 from 34 nations

Competition at external databases
- Links: IJF • EJU • JudoInside

The 2016 Judo Grand Slam was held in Abu Dhabi, United Arab Emirates, from 28 to 30 October 2016.

== Medal summary ==
=== Men's events ===
Event	Gold	Silver	Bronze
Extra-lightweight (−60 kg)	Francisco Garrigós (ESP)	Eric Takabatake (BRA)	Albert Oguzov (RUS)
Extra-lightweight (−60 kg)	Francisco Garrigós (ESP)	Eric Takabatake (BRA)	Cédric Revol (FRA)
Half-lightweight (−66 kg)	Yakub Shamilov (RUS)	Azamat Mukanov (KAZ)	Arsen Galstyan (RUS)
Half-lightweight (−66 kg)	Yakub Shamilov (RUS)	Azamat Mukanov (KAZ)	Charles Chibana (BRA)
Lightweight (−73 kg)	Tommy Macias (SWE)	Rustam Orujov (AZE)	Victor Scvortov (UAE)
Lightweight (−73 kg)	Tommy Macias (SWE)	Rustam Orujov (AZE)	Musa Mogushkov (RUS)
Half-middleweight (−81 kg)	Sergiu Toma (UAE)	Victor Penalber (BRA)	Frank de Wit (NED)
Half-middleweight (−81 kg)	Sergiu Toma (UAE)	Victor Penalber (BRA)	Srđan Mrvaljević (MNE)
Middleweight (−90 kg)	Aleksandar Kukolj (SRB)	Axel Clerget (FRA)	Tural Safguliyev (AZE)
Middleweight (−90 kg)	Aleksandar Kukolj (SRB)	Axel Clerget (FRA)	Nemanja Majdov (SRB)
Half-heavyweight (−100 kg)	Elkhan Mammadov (AZE)	Luciano Corrêa (BRA)	Joakim Dvärby (SWE)
Half-heavyweight (−100 kg)	Elkhan Mammadov (AZE)	Luciano Corrêa (BRA)	Philip Awiti-Alcaraz (GBR)
Heavyweight (+100 kg)	Daniel Natea (ROU)	Aliaksandr Vakhaviak (BLR)	Michal Horák (CZE)
Heavyweight (+100 kg)	Daniel Natea (ROU)	Aliaksandr Vakhaviak (BLR)	David Moura (BRA)

=== Women's events ===
Event	Gold	Silver	Bronze
Extra-lightweight (−48 kg)	Otgontsetseg Galbadrakh (KAZ)	Milica Nikolić (SRB)	Mönkhbatyn Urantsetseg (MGL)
Extra-lightweight (−48 kg)	Otgontsetseg Galbadrakh (KAZ)	Milica Nikolić (SRB)	Nathalia Brigida (BRA)
Half-lightweight (−52 kg)	Astride Gneto (FRA)	Angelica Delgado (USA)	Kelly Edwards (GBR)
Half-lightweight (−52 kg)	Astride Gneto (FRA)	Angelica Delgado (USA)	Jéssica Pereira (BRA)
Lightweight (−57 kg)	Hélène Receveaux (FRA)	Theresa Stoll (GER)	Lola Benarroche (FRA)
Lightweight (−57 kg)	Hélène Receveaux (FRA)	Theresa Stoll (GER)	Johanna Müller (GER)
Half-middleweight (−63 kg)	Juul Franssen (NED)	Kathrin Unterwurzacher (AUT)	Mariana Silva (BRA)
Half-middleweight (−63 kg)	Juul Franssen (NED)	Kathrin Unterwurzacher (AUT)	Ketleyn Quadros (BRA)
Middleweight (−70 kg)	Marie-Ève Gahié (FRA)	Maria Portela (BRA)	Katie-Jemima Yeats-Brown (GBR)
Middleweight (−70 kg)	Marie-Ève Gahié (FRA)	Maria Portela (BRA)	Bárbara Timo (BRA)
Half-heavyweight (−78 kg)	Guusje Steenhuis (NED)	Anna-Maria Wagner (GER)	Samanta Soares (BRA)
Half-heavyweight (−78 kg)	Guusje Steenhuis (NED)	Anna-Maria Wagner (GER)	Anastasiya Turchyn (UKR)
Heavyweight (+78 kg)	Maria Suelen Altheman (BRA)	Carolin Weiß (GER)	Maryna Slutskaya (BLR)
Heavyweight (+78 kg)	Maria Suelen Altheman (BRA)	Carolin Weiß (GER)	Santa Pakenytė (LTU)

Source Results

=== Medal table ===
* Host nation (United Arab Emirates)

Rank	Nation	Gold	Silver	Bronze	Total
1	France (FRA)	3	1	2	6
2	Netherlands (NED)	2	0	1	3
3	Brazil (BRA)	1	4	8	13
4	Azerbaijan (AZE)	1	1	1	3
4	Serbia (SRB)	1	1	1	3
6	Kazakhstan (KAZ)	1	1	0	2
7	Russia (RUS)	1	0	3	4
8	Sweden (SWE)	1	0	1	2
8	United Arab Emirates (UAE)*	1	0	1	2
10	Romania (ROU)	1	0	0	1
10	Spain (ESP)	1	0	0	1
12	Germany (GER)	0	3	1	4
13	Belarus (BLR)	0	1	1	2
14	Austria (AUT)	0	1	0	1
14	United States (USA)	0	1	0	1
16	Great Britain (GBR)	0	0	3	3
17	Czech Republic (CZE)	0	0	1	1
17	Lithuania (LTU)	0	0	1	1
17	Mongolia (MGL)	0	0	1	1
17	Montenegro (MNE)	0	0	1	1
17	Ukraine (UKR)	0	0	1	1
Totals (21 entries)		14	14	28	56
