= 2014 Judo Grand Prix Zagreb =

Judo competition

Judo 2014 Judo Grand Prix Zagreb
- Location: Zagreb, Croatia
- Dates: 12–14 September 2014
- Competitors: 328 from 46 nations

Competition at external databases
- Links: IJF • JudoInside

The 2014 Judo Grand Prix Zagreb was held in Zagreb, Croatia from 12 to 14 September 2014.

== Medal summary ==
=== Men's events ===
Event	Gold	Silver	Bronze
Extra-lightweight (−60 kg)	Ludwig Paischer (AUT)	Ahmet Şahin Kaba (TUR)	Pavel Petřikov (CZE)
Extra-lightweight (−60 kg)	Ludwig Paischer (AUT)	Ahmet Şahin Kaba (TUR)	Diego Dos Santos (BRA)
Half-lightweight (−66 kg)	Jasper Lefevere (BEL)	Alim Gadanov (RUS)	Tal Flicker (ISR)
Half-lightweight (−66 kg)	Jasper Lefevere (BEL)	Alim Gadanov (RUS)	Adrian Gomboc (SLO)
Lightweight (−73 kg)	Dex Elmont (NED)	André Alves (POR)	Andrea Regis (ITA)
Lightweight (−73 kg)	Dex Elmont (NED)	André Alves (POR)	Florent Urani (FRA)
Half-middleweight (−81 kg)	Sirazhudin Magomedov (RUS)	Travis Stevens (USA)	Murat Khabachirov (RUS)
Half-middleweight (−81 kg)	Sirazhudin Magomedov (RUS)	Travis Stevens (USA)	Matteo Marconcini (ITA)
Middleweight (−90 kg)	Krisztián Tóth (HUN)	Aleksandar Kukolj (SRB)	Karolis Bauža (LTU)
Middleweight (−90 kg)	Krisztián Tóth (HUN)	Aleksandar Kukolj (SRB)	Noël van 't End (NED)
Half-heavyweight (−100 kg)	Adlan Bisultanov (RUS)	Aleksandre Mskhaladze (GEO)	Jevgeņijs Borodavko (LAT)
Half-heavyweight (−100 kg)	Adlan Bisultanov (RUS)	Aleksandre Mskhaladze (GEO)	Jorge Fonseca (POR)
Heavyweight (+100 kg)	Roy Meyer (NED)	Mohamed-Amine Tayeb (ALG)	Or Sasson (ISR)
Heavyweight (+100 kg)	Roy Meyer (NED)	Mohamed-Amine Tayeb (ALG)	Vlăduț Simionescu (ROU)

=== Women's events ===
Event	Gold	Silver	Bronze
Extra-lightweight (−48 kg)	Monica Ungureanu (ROU)	Julia Figueroa (ESP)	Taciana Cesar (GBS)
Extra-lightweight (−48 kg)	Monica Ungureanu (ROU)	Julia Figueroa (ESP)	Charline Van Snick (BEL)
Half-lightweight (−52 kg)	Annabelle Euranie (FRA)	Joana Ramos (POR)	Gili Cohen (ISR)
Half-lightweight (−52 kg)	Annabelle Euranie (FRA)	Joana Ramos (POR)	Raquel Silva (BRA)
Lightweight (−57 kg)	Laëtitia Blot (FRA)	Hedvig Karakas (HUN)	Loredana Ohai (ROU)
Lightweight (−57 kg)	Laëtitia Blot (FRA)	Hedvig Karakas (HUN)	Jovana Rogić (SRB)
Half-middleweight (−63 kg)	Tina Trstenjak (SLO)	Mia Hermansson (SWE)	Maelle Di Cintio (FRA)
Half-middleweight (−63 kg)	Tina Trstenjak (SLO)	Mia Hermansson (SWE)	Gemma Howell (GBR)
Middleweight (−70 kg)	Kelita Zupancic (CAN)	Katarzyna Kłys (POL)	Barbara Matić (CRO)
Middleweight (−70 kg)	Kelita Zupancic (CAN)	Katarzyna Kłys (POL)	Maria Portela (BRA)
Half-heavyweight (−78 kg)	Anamari Velenšek (SLO)	Abigél Joó (HUN)	Natalie Powell (GBR)
Half-heavyweight (−78 kg)	Anamari Velenšek (SLO)	Abigél Joó (HUN)	Viktoriya Turks (UKR)
Heavyweight (+78 kg)	Yu Song (CHN)	Svitlana Iaromka (UKR)	Rochele Nunes (BRA)
Heavyweight (+78 kg)	Yu Song (CHN)	Svitlana Iaromka (UKR)	Tessie Savelkouls (NED)

Source Results

=== Medal table ===
* Host nation (Croatia)

Rank	Nation	Gold	Silver	Bronze	Total
1	Russia (RUS)	2	1	1	4
2	France (FRA)	2	0	2	4
2	Netherlands (NED)	2	0	2	4
4	Slovenia (SLO)	2	0	1	3
5	Hungary (HUN)	1	2	0	3
6	Romania (ROU)	1	0	2	3
7	Belgium (BEL)	1	0	1	2
8	Austria (AUT)	1	0	0	1
8	Canada (CAN)	1	0	0	1
8	China (CHN)	1	0	0	1
11	Portugal (POR)	0	2	1	3
12	Serbia (SRB)	0	1	1	2
12	Ukraine (UKR)	0	1	1	2
14	Algeria (ALG)	0	1	0	1
14	Georgia (GEO)	0	1	0	1
14	Poland (POL)	0	1	0	1
14	Spain (ESP)	0	1	0	1
14	Sweden (SWE)	0	1	0	1
14	Turkey (TUR)	0	1	0	1
14	United States (USA)	0	1	0	1
21	Brazil (BRA)	0	0	4	4
22	Israel (ISR)	0	0	3	3
23	Great Britain (GBR)	0	0	2	2
23	Italy (ITA)	0	0	2	2
25	Croatia (CRO)*	0	0	1	1
25	Czech Republic (CZE)	0	0	1	1
25	Guinea-Bissau (GBS)	0	0	1	1
25	Latvia (LAT)	0	0	1	1
25	Lithuania (LTU)	0	0	1	1
Totals (29 entries)		14	14	28	56
