= 2015 Judo Grand Prix Budapest =

Judo competition

Judo 2015 Judo Grand Prix Budapest
- Venue: László Papp Budapest Sports Arena
- Location: Budapest, Hungary
- Dates: 13–14 June 2015
- Competitors: 410 from 67 nations

Competition at external databases
- Links: IJF • JudoInside

The 2015 Judo Grand Prix Budapest was held at the László Papp Budapest Sports Arena in Budapest, Hungary from 13 to 14 June 2015.

== Medal summary ==
=== Men's events ===
Event	Gold	Silver	Bronze
Extra-lightweight (−60 kg)	Yeldos Smetov (KAZ)	Aibek Imashev (KAZ)	Sharafuddin Lutfillaev (UZB)
Extra-lightweight (−60 kg)	Yeldos Smetov (KAZ)	Aibek Imashev (KAZ)	Toru Shishime (JPN)
Half-lightweight (−66 kg)	Zhansay Smagulov (KAZ)	Sebastian Seidl (GER)	Sergiu Oleinic (POR)
Half-lightweight (−66 kg)	Zhansay Smagulov (KAZ)	Sebastian Seidl (GER)	Arsen Galstyan (RUS)
Lightweight (−73 kg)	Miklós Ungvári (HUN)	Rok Drakšič (SLO)	Nicholas Delpopolo (USA)
Lightweight (−73 kg)	Miklós Ungvári (HUN)	Rok Drakšič (SLO)	Dirk Van Tichelt (BEL)
Half-middleweight (−81 kg)	Yakhyo Imamov (UZB)	Alain Schmitt (FRA)	Sven Maresch (GER)
Half-middleweight (−81 kg)	Yakhyo Imamov (UZB)	Alain Schmitt (FRA)	Roman Moustopoulos (GRE)
Middleweight (−90 kg)	Célio Dias (POR)	Romain Buffet (FRA)	Asley González (CUB)
Middleweight (−90 kg)	Célio Dias (POR)	Romain Buffet (FRA)	Li Kochman (ISR)
Half-heavyweight (−100 kg)	Ramadan Darwish (EGY)	Dimitri Peters (GER)	Adlan Bisultanov (RUS)
Half-heavyweight (−100 kg)	Ramadan Darwish (EGY)	Dimitri Peters (GER)	Artem Bloshenko (UKR)
Heavyweight (+100 kg)	Takeshi Ōjitani (JPN)	Oleksandr Gordiienko (UKR)	Faïcel Jaballah (TUN)
Heavyweight (+100 kg)	Takeshi Ōjitani (JPN)	Oleksandr Gordiienko (UKR)	Sven Heinle (GER)

=== Women's events ===
Event	Gold	Silver	Bronze
Extra-lightweight (−48 kg)	Paula Pareto (ARG)	Funa Tonaki (JPN)	Nataliya Kondratyeva (RUS)
Extra-lightweight (−48 kg)	Paula Pareto (ARG)	Funa Tonaki (JPN)	Taciana Cesar (GBS)
Half-lightweight (−52 kg)	Mareen Kräh (GER)	Maria Ertl (GER)	Joana Ramos (POR)
Half-lightweight (−52 kg)	Mareen Kräh (GER)	Maria Ertl (GER)	Laura Gómez (ESP)
Lightweight (−57 kg)	Lien Chen-ling (TPE)	Viola Wächter (GER)	Marti Malloy (USA)
Lightweight (−57 kg)	Lien Chen-ling (TPE)	Viola Wächter (GER)	Momo Tamaoki (JPN)
Half-middleweight (−63 kg)	Tina Trstenjak (SLO)	Pari Surakatova (RUS)	Mia Hermansson (SWE)
Half-middleweight (−63 kg)	Tina Trstenjak (SLO)	Pari Surakatova (RUS)	Anna Bernholm (SWE)
Middleweight (−70 kg)	María Bernabéu (ESP)	Szaundra Diedrich (GER)	Laura Vargas Koch (GER)
Middleweight (−70 kg)	María Bernabéu (ESP)	Szaundra Diedrich (GER)	Anett Mészáros (HUN)
Half-heavyweight (−78 kg)	Kayla Harrison (USA)	Anamari Velenšek (SLO)	Marhinde Verkerk (NED)
Half-heavyweight (−78 kg)	Kayla Harrison (USA)	Anamari Velenšek (SLO)	Luise Malzahn (GER)
Heavyweight (+78 kg)	Kayra Sayit (TUR)	Nihel Cheikh Rouhou (TUN)	Idalys Ortiz (CUB)
Heavyweight (+78 kg)	Kayra Sayit (TUR)	Nihel Cheikh Rouhou (TUN)	Franziska Konitz (GER)

Source Results

=== Medal table ===
* Host nation (Hungary)

Rank	Nation	Gold	Silver	Bronze	Total
1	Kazakhstan (KAZ)	2	1	0	3
2	Germany (GER)	1	5	5	11
3	Slovenia (SLO)	1	2	0	3
4	Japan (JPN)	1	1	2	4
5	Portugal (POR)	1	0	2	3
5	United States (USA)	1	0	2	3
7	Hungary (HUN)*	1	0	1	2
7	Spain (ESP)	1	0	1	2
7	Uzbekistan (UZB)	1	0	1	2
10	Argentina (ARG)	1	0	0	1
10	Chinese Taipei (TPE)	1	0	0	1
10	Egypt (EGY)	1	0	0	1
10	Turkey (TUR)	1	0	0	1
14	France (FRA)	0	2	0	2
15	Russia (RUS)	0	1	3	4
16	Tunisia (TUN)	0	1	1	2
16	Ukraine (UKR)	0	1	1	2
18	Cuba (CUB)	0	0	2	2
18	Sweden (SWE)	0	0	2	2
20	Belgium (BEL)	0	0	1	1
20	Greece (GRE)	0	0	1	1
20	Guinea-Bissau (GBS)	0	0	1	1
20	Israel (ISR)	0	0	1	1
20	Netherlands (NED)	0	0	1	1
Totals (24 entries)		14	14	28	56
