= Ryu Shichinohe =

Japanese judoka

Personal information
- Nationality: Japanese
- Born: 14 October 1988 (age 37)
- Occupation: Judoka

Sport
- Country: Japan
- Sport: Judo
- Weight class: +100 kg

Achievements and titles
- World Champ.: (silver) (2014, 2015)
- Asian Champ.: (silver) (2017)
Medal record
Men's judo
Representing Japan
World Championships
Silver medal – second place	2014 Chelyabinsk	+100 kg
Silver medal – second place	2015 Astana	+100 kg
Asian Championships
Silver medal – second place	2017 Hong Kong	+100 kg
World Masters
Bronze medal – third place	2015 Rabat	+100 kg
IJF Grand Slam
Gold medal – first place	2014 Paris	+100 kg
Silver medal – second place	2015 Tokyo	+100 kg
Silver medal – second place	2017 Paris	+100 kg
Bronze medal – third place	2012 Tokyo	+100 kg
Bronze medal – third place	2016 Tokyo	+100 kg
IJF Grand Prix
Gold medal – first place	2014 Ulaanbaatar	+100 kg
Gold medal – first place	2015 Düsseldorf	+100 kg

Profile at external databases
- IJF: 9158
- JudoInside.com: 46433
- Updated on 3 July 2023

Ryū Shichinohe (七戸 龍, Shichinohe Ryū; born 14 October 1988 in Okinawa) is a male Japanese judoka.

His father, Yasuhiro Shichinohe, is a former Kyokushin karate national champion and his mother is Belgian. In childhood, he practiced both judo and karate, but at the age of 13, he chose to focus only on judo. In 2011, after graduating from Fukuoka University, he was employed by Kyushu Electric Power.

Shichinohe won the silver medal in the heavyweight (+100 kg) division at the 2014 and 2015 World Judo Championships.
