= Mohamed-Amine Tayeb =

Algerian judoka (born 1985)

Personal information
- Born: 28 September 1985 (age 40)
- Occupation: Judoka

Sport
- Country: Algeria
- Sport: Judo
- Weight class: +100 kg

Achievements and titles
- Olympic Games: R16 (2016)
- World Champ.: R32 (2013)
- African Champ.: (silver) (2013, 2014, 2016)
Medal record
Men's judo
Representing Algeria
African Championships
Silver medal – second place	2013 Maputo	+100 kg
Silver medal – second place	2014 Port Louis	Open
Silver medal – second place	2016 Tunis	+100 kg
Bronze medal – third place	2012 Agadir	+100 kg
Bronze medal – third place	2018 Tunis	+100 kg
IJF Grand Prix
Silver medal – second place	2014 Zagreb	+100 kg
Bronze medal – third place	2016 Almaty	+100 kg

Profile at external databases
- IJF: 10388
- JudoInside.com: 55118
- Updated on 8 December 2022

Mohamed-Amine Tayeb (born 28 September 1985) is an Algerian judoka. He competed at the 2016 Summer Olympics in the +100 kg event.
