= Derek Sua =

Samoan judoka

Personal information
- Full name: Derek Sua
- Nationality: Samoan
- Born: 29 December 1987 (age 38)
- Occupation: Judoka
- Weight: 100+ kg

Sport
- Country: Samoa
- Sport: Judo
- Event: Olympics
Medal record
Men's Judo
Representing Samoa
Pacific Games
Bronze medal – third place	2019 Apia	+100kg
Bronze medal – third place	2023 Honiara	+100kg
Oceania Championships
Gold medal – first place	2017 Nukuʻalofa	+100kg

Profile at external databases
- IJF: 9904
- JudoInside.com: 61464

Nanai Derek Sua (born 29 December 1987) is a Samoan judoka who has represented Samoa at the Pacific Games, Commonwealth Games, and Olympic Games.

He competed in the 2014 Commonwealth Games in Glasgow, but did not advance.

He was awarded with a wild card for the 2016 Summer Olympics in Rio de Janeiro, in the men's +100 kg, where he was eliminated by Abdullo Tangriev in the second round.

He won a gold medal at the 2017 OJU Senior Championships in Nukuʻalofa, Tonga. He won bronze at the 2019 Pacific Games in Apia.
