= Renat Saidov =

Russian judoka (born 1988)

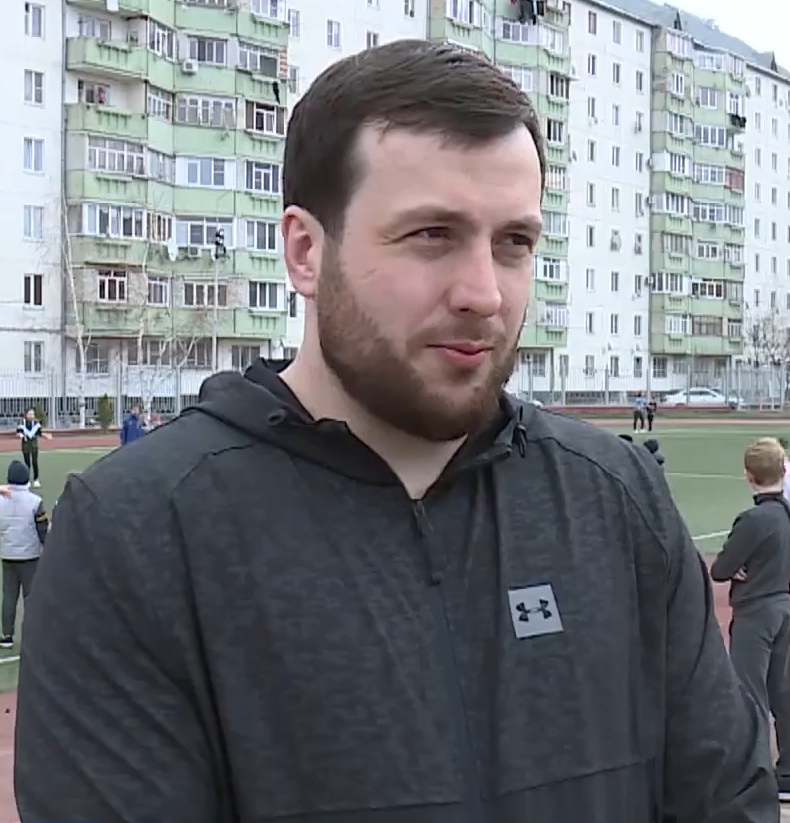
- Saidov in 2021

Personal information
- Full name: Renat Malikovich Saidov
- Nationality: Russian
- Born: 27 September 1988 (age 37) Stavropol, Russia
- Occupation: Judoka
- Height: 2.10 m (6 ft 11 in)
- Weight: 125 kg (276 lb)

Sport
- Country: Russia
- Sport: Judo
- Weight class: +100 kg

Achievements and titles
- Olympic Games: R16 (2016)
- World Champ.: (bronze) (2014)
- European Champ.: (bronze) (2015)
Medal record
Men's judo
Representing Russia
World Championships
Silver medal – second place	2013 Rio de Janeiro	Men's team
Bronze medal – third place	2014 Chelyabinsk	+100 kg
European Games
Bronze medal – third place	2015 Baku	+100 kg
Bronze medal – third place	2015 Baku	Men's team
European Championships
Silver medal – second place	2014 Montpellier	Men's team
Silver medal – second place	2017 Warsaw	Men's team
World Masters
Bronze medal – third place	2013 Tyumen	+100 kg
IJF Grand Slam
Gold medal – first place	2014 Tokyo	+100 kg
Bronze medal – third place	2012 Moscow	+100 kg
Bronze medal – third place	2014 Paris	+100 kg
Bronze medal – third place	2014 Baku	+100 kg
IJF Grand Prix
Gold medal – first place	2014 Havana	+100 kg
Gold medal – first place	2016 Havana	+100 kg
Silver medal – second place	2012 Qingdao	+100 kg
Silver medal – second place	2013 Miami	+100 kg
European U23 Championships
Bronze medal – third place	2010 Sarajevo	+100 kg
Summer Universiade
Silver medal – second place	2011 Shenzhen	Open
Bronze medal – third place	2013 Kazan	+100 kg

Profile at external databases
- IJF: 2378
- JudoInside.com: 57750
- Updated on 4 July 2023

Renat Saidov (born 27 September 1988) is a Russian judoka.
