= Sven Heinle =

German judoka (born 1992)

Personal information
- Born: 25 January 1992 (age 34)
- Occupation: Judoka

Sport
- Country: Germany
- Sport: Judo
- Weight class: +100 kg

Achievements and titles
- World Champ.: 7th (2015)
- European Champ.: R16 (2019)
Medal record
Men's judo
Representing Germany
IJF Grand Prix
Gold medal – first place	2019 Marrakesh	+100 kg
Gold medal – first place	2019 Perth	+100 kg
Silver medal – second place	2015 Ulaanbaatar	+100 kg
Silver medal – second place	2016 Zagreb	+100 kg
Bronze medal – third place	2015 Düsseldorf	+100 kg
Bronze medal – third place	2015 Budapest	+100 kg
European U23 Championships
Bronze medal – third place	2013 Samokov	+100 kg
World Juniors Championships
Bronze medal – third place	2011 Cape Town	+100 kg
European Junior Championships
Bronze medal – third place	2010 Samokov	+100 kg
Bronze medal – third place	2011 Lommel	+100 kg
European Cadet Championships
Bronze medal – third place	2008 Sarajevo	+90 kg

Profile at external databases
- IJF: 3529
- JudoInside.com: 48975
- Updated on 29 November 2022

Sven Heinle (born 25 January 1992) is a German judoka.

Heinle is the gold medalist from the 2019 Judo Grand Prix Marrakesh in the +100 kg category.
