= Levani Matiashvili =

Georgian judoka (born 1993)

Personal information
- Born: 4 June 1993 (age 33)
- Occupation: Judoka

Sport
- Country: Georgia
- Sport: Judo
- Weight class: +100 kg

Achievements and titles
- World Champ.: R32 (2014, 2015)
- European Champ.: (bronze) (2016, 2020)
Medal record
Men's judo
Representing Georgia
World Championships
Bronze medal – third place	2014 Chelyabinsk	Men's team
Bronze medal – third place	2015 Astana	Men's team
European Games
Silver medal – second place	2015 Baku	Men's team
European Championships
Gold medal – first place	2014 Montpellier	Men's team
Gold medal – first place	2016 Kazan	Men's team
Bronze medal – third place	2016 Kazan	+100 kg
Bronze medal – third place	2020 Prague	+100 kg
IJF Grand Slam
Silver medal – second place	2014 Tokyo	+100 kg
Silver medal – second place	2017 Ekaterinburg	+100 kg
Bronze medal – third place	2013 Baku	+100 kg
Bronze medal – third place	2015 Baku	+100 kg
Bronze medal – third place	2020 Budapest	+100 kg
Bronze medal – third place	2022 Tbilisi	+100 kg
IJF Grand Prix
Gold medal – first place	2015 Tbilisi	+100 kg
Gold medal – first place	2019 Tbilisi	+100 kg
Silver medal – second place	2016 Samsun	+100 kg
Silver medal – second place	2019 Antalya	+100 kg
Bronze medal – third place	2014 Tbilisi	+100 kg
Bronze medal – third place	2014 Samsun	+100 kg
Bronze medal – third place	2014 Budapest	+100 kg
Bronze medal – third place	2014 Ulaanbaatar	+100 kg
Bronze medal – third place	2016 Almaty	+100 kg
Bronze medal – third place	2017 Tbilisi	+100 kg
Bronze medal – third place	2018 Tbilisi	+100 kg
Bronze medal – third place	2019 Hohhot	+100 kg
Bronze medal – third place	2019 Zagreb	+100 kg
World Juniors Championships
Bronze medal – third place	2013 Ljubljana	+100 kg
European Junior Championships
Gold medal – first place	2012 Poreč	+100 kg
Silver medal – second place	2011 Lommel	+100 kg
Silver medal – second place	2013 Sarajevo	+100 kg

Profile at external databases
- IJF: 3740
- JudoInside.com: 71062
- Updated on 5 June 2022

Levani Matiashvili (born 4 June 1993) is a Georgian judoka. He won one of the bronze medals in men's team event at the World Judo Championships in 2014 and in 2015. He won the silver medal in this event at the 2015 European Games held in Baku, Azerbaijan.

Matiashvili won one of the bronze medals in the men's +100 kg event at the 2020 European Judo Championships held in Prague, Czech Republic.
