= Michal Horák =

Czech judoka

Personal information
- Nationality: Czech
- Born: 10 September 1987 (age 38)
- Occupation: Judoka

Sport
- Country: Czech Republic
- Sport: Judo
- Weight class: –100 kg, +100 kg

Achievements and titles
- World Champ.: R16 (2014, 2015)
- European Champ.: R16 (2016)
Medal record
Men's judo
Representing Czech Republic
IJF Grand Slam
Bronze medal – third place	2016 Abu Dhabi	+100 kg
IJF Grand Prix
Gold medal – first place	2013 Ulaanbaatar	–100 kg
Silver medal – second place	2013 Rijeka	–100 kg

Profile at external databases
- IJF: 4663
- JudoInside.com: 47580
- Updated on 25 November 2022

Michal Horák (born 10 September 1987) is a Czech judoka.

He is the bronze medallist of the 2016 Judo Grand Slam Abu Dhabi in the +100 kg category.
