= Daniel Natea =

Romanian judoka (born 1992)

Personal information
- Born: 21 April 1992 (age 34)
- Occupation: Judoka

Sport
- Country: Romania
- Sport: Judo
- Weight class: +100 kg

Achievements and titles
- Olympic Games: R16 (2016)
- World Champ.: R16 (2015)
- European Champ.: (bronze) (2016)
Medal record
Representing Romania
Men's judo
European Championships
Bronze medal – third place	2016 Kazan	+100 kg
World Masters
Gold medal – first place	2016 Guadalajara	+100 kg
IJF Grand Slam
Gold medal – first place	2014 Abu Dhabi	+100 kg
Gold medal – first place	2016 Abu Dhabi	+100 kg
Bronze medal – third place	2014 Baku	+100 kg
IJF Grand Prix
Gold medal – first place	2016 Zagreb	+100 kg
Bronze medal – third place	2014 Ulaanbaatar	+100 kg
European U23 Championships
Bronze medal – third place	2013 Samokov	+100 kg
Bronze medal – third place	2014 Wrocław	+100 kg
Men's sambo
World Championships
Silver medal – second place	2019 Seoul	+100 kg
Bronze medal – third place	2020 Novi Sad	+100 kg
Bronze medal – third place	2021 Tashkent	+98 kg
European Championships
Gold medal – first place	2019 Gijon	+100 kg
Bronze medal – third place	2021 Limassol	+98 kg

Profile at external databases
- IJF: 3393
- JudoInside.com: 46141
- Updated on 7 April 2024

Daniel Natea (born 21 April 1992) is a Romanian judoka. He competed at the 2016 Summer Olympics in the men's +100 kg event, in which he was eliminated in the second round by Abdullo Tangriev.
