= Oleksandr Gordiienko =

Ukrainian judoka (born 1991)

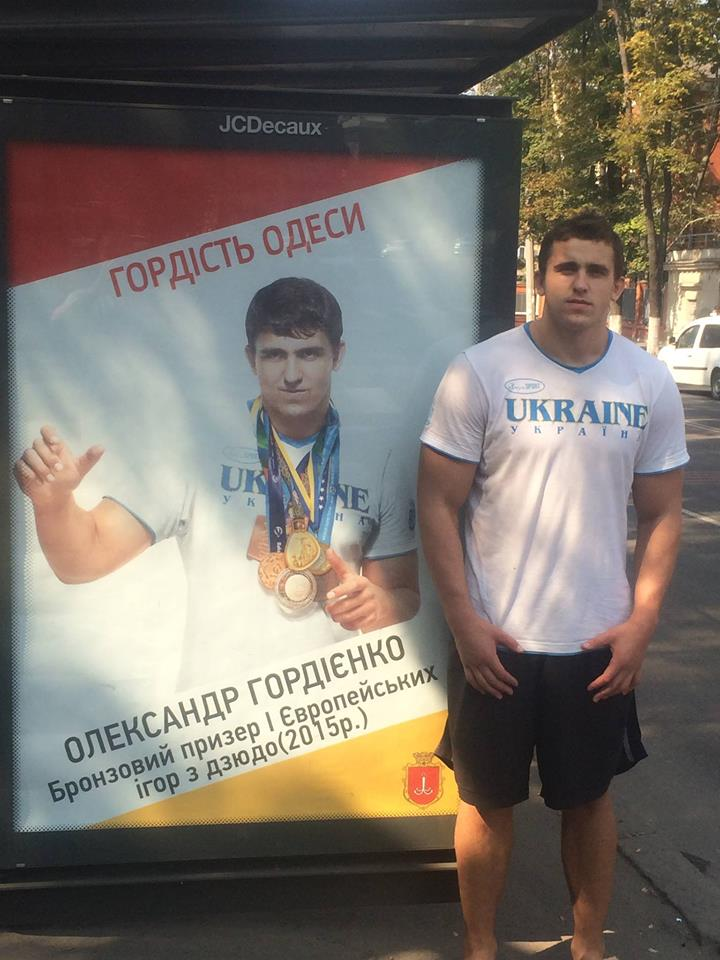

Personal information
- Born: 21 January 1991 (age 35)
- Occupation: Judoka

Sport
- Country: Ukraine
- Sport: Judo
- Weight class: +100 kg

Achievements and titles
- World Champ.: R32 (2018)
- European Champ.: 5th (2016)
Medal record
Men's judo
Representing Ukraine
European Games
Bronze medal – third place	2015 Baku	Men's team
IJF Grand Prix
Gold medal – first place	2018 Tunis	+100 kg
Silver medal – second place	2015 Budapest	+100 kg
Bronze medal – third place	2015 Tbilisi	+100 kg
Bronze medal – third place	2015 Qingdao	+100 kg
Bronze medal – third place	2018 Agadir	+100 kg

Profile at external databases
- IJF: 15323
- JudoInside.com: 75404
- Updated on 5 December 2022

Oleksandr Gordiienko (born 21 January 1991) is a Ukrainian judoka.

Gordiienko is the gold medalist of the 2018 Judo Grand Prix Tbilisi in the +100 kg category.
