= André Breitbarth =

German judoka (born 1990)

Personal information
- Born: 6 April 1990 (age 36)
- Occupation: Judoka

Sport
- Country: Germany
- Sport: Judo
- Weight class: +100 kg

Achievements and titles
- Olympic Games: R32 (2016)
- World Champ.: 5th (2015)
- European Champ.: (bronze) (2014)
Medal record
Men's judo
Representing Germany
European Championships
Bronze medal – third place	2014 Montpellier	+100 kg
IJF Grand Slam
Bronze medal – third place	2015 Abu Dhabi	+100 kg
IJF Grand Prix
Gold medal – first place	2013 Tashkent	+100 kg
Bronze medal – third place	2013 Abu Dhabi	+100 kg
Bronze medal – third place	2014 Astana	+100 kg
Bronze medal – third place	2015 Tashkent	+100 kg
Bronze medal – third place	2016 Havana	+100 kg
Bronze medal – third place	2016 Budapest	+100 kg
European U23 Championships
Gold medal – first place	2010 Sarajevo	+100 kg
Bronze medal – third place	2011 Tyumen	+100 kg
Bronze medal – third place	2012 Prague	+100 kg
World Juniors Championships
Bronze medal – third place	2009 Paris	+100 kg
European Junior Championships
Bronze medal – third place	2008 Warsaw	+100 kg
European Cadet Championships
Silver medal – second place	2006 Miskolc	+90 kg

Profile at external databases
- IJF: 1243
- JudoInside.com: 36158
- Updated on 14 November 2022

Andre Breitbarth (born 6 April 1990) is a German judoka. He competed at the 2016 Summer Olympics in the men's +100 kg event, in which he was eliminated in the first round by Iurii Krakovetskii.
