= Iurii Krakovetskii =

Kyrgyzstani judoka (born 1992)

Personal information
- Born: 27 August 1992 (age 34) Bishkek, Kyrgyzstan
- Occupation: Judoka

Sport
- Country: Kyrgyzstan
- Sport: Judo
- Weight class: +100 kg

Achievements and titles
- Olympic Games: 7th (2016)
- World Champ.: 7th (2014)
- Asian Champ.: (silver) (2013, 2015)
Medal record
Men's judo
Representing Kyrgyzstan
Asian Championships
Silver medal – second place	2013 Bangkok	+100 kg
Silver medal – second place	2015 Kuwait City	+100 kg
Bronze medal – third place	2016 Tashkent	+100 kg
Bronze medal – third place	2017 Hong Kong	+100 kg
Bronze medal – third place	2019 Fujairah	+100 kg
IJF Grand Slam
Bronze medal – third place	2013 Moscow	+100 kg
Bronze medal – third place	2018 Abu Dhabi	+100 kg
IJF Grand Prix
Silver medal – second place	2014 Astana	+100 kg
Silver medal – second place	2017 Antalya	+100 kg
Silver medal – second place	2017 Tashkent	+100 kg
Bronze medal – third place	2013 Almaty	+100 kg
Bronze medal – third place	2015 Samsun	+100 kg
Bronze medal – third place	2018 Tashkent	+100 kg
Asian Junior Championships
Bronze medal – third place	2009 Beirut	+100 kg
Bronze medal – third place	2010 Bangkok	+100 kg
Bronze medal – third place	2011 Beirut	+100 kg

Profile at external databases
- IJF: 2795
- JudoInside.com: 57770
- Updated on 26 November 2022

Iurii Krakovetskii (born 27 August 1992 in Bishkek, Kyrgyzstan) is a Kyrgyzstani judoka. He competed at the 2012 Summer Olympics in the +100 kg event.
