= Artūrs Ņikiforenko =

Latvian judoka (born 1992)

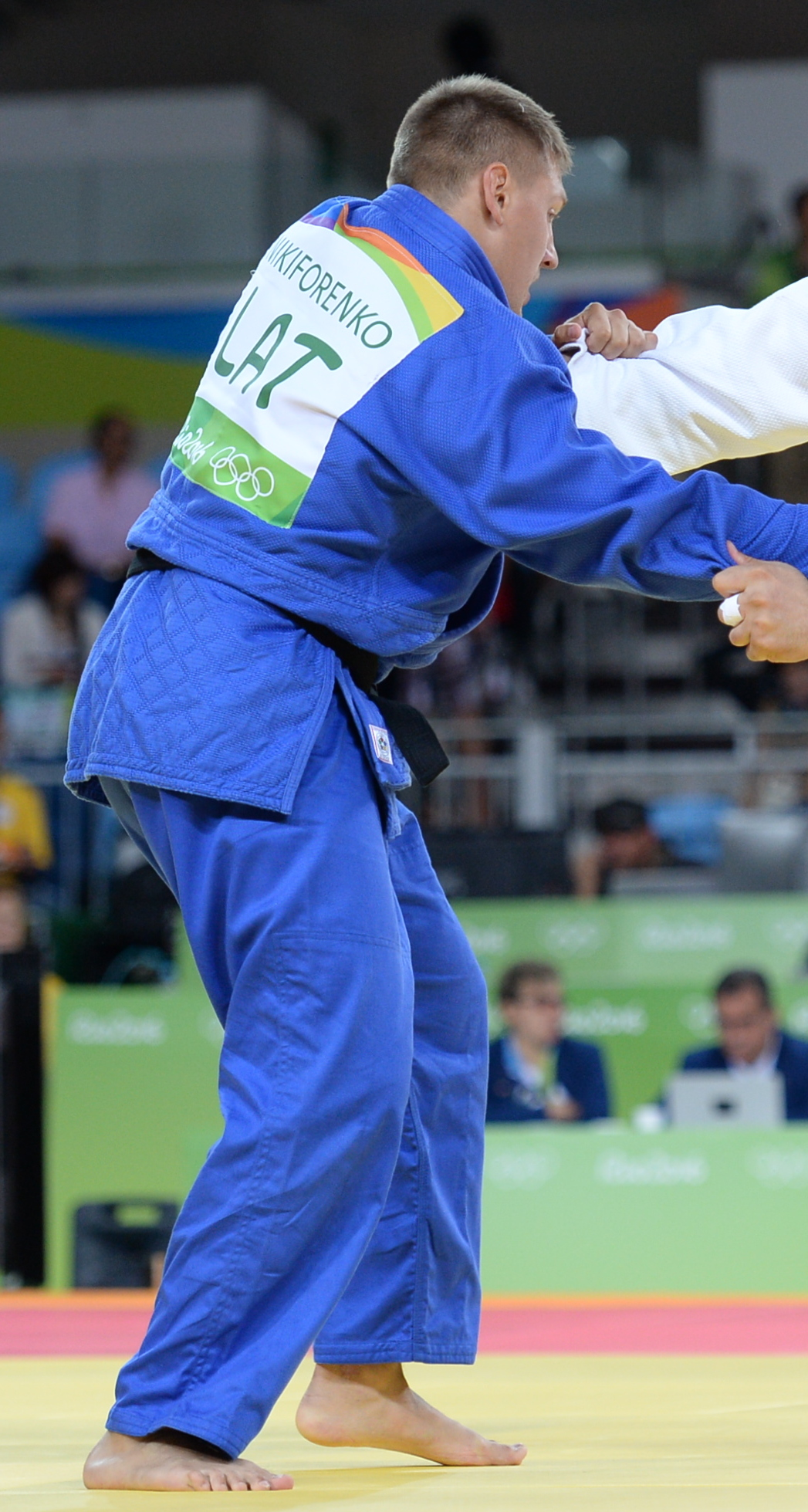
- Ņikiforenko at the 2016 Olympics

Personal information
- Born: 1 March 1992 (age 34) Riga, Latvia
- Height: 185 cm (6 ft 1 in)
- Weight: 110 kg (243 lb)

Sport
- Sport: Judo, Brazilian Jiu Jitsu (BJJ)
- Rank: Black belt in Judo Blue belt in Brazilian Jiu-Jitsu
- Club: Makkabi Sports Fight Club
- Coached by: Oleg Baskin
Medal record
Brazilian Jiu-Jitsu
Representing Latvia
European Championship
Gold medal – first place	2017 Lisbon	-100kg (blue)

Artūrs Ņikiforenko (born 1 March 1992) is a Latvian heavyweight judoka and Brazilian Jiu Jitsu (BJJ) competitor. He competed at the 2016 Olympics, where he was eliminated in the first bout. In 2017 he won the European Championship (Brazilian jiu-jitsu).
