= Juhan Mettis =

Estonian judoka (born 1990)

Juhan Mettis (born 19 June 1990) is an Estonian judoka.

He was born in Tartu. In 2014 he graduated from the University of Tartu's Institute of Physical Education.

He started his judo training in 1997, coached by Riina Tormis; later his coach was Andres Põhjala. He won silver medal at 2009 European Junior Judo Championships. He has also competed at European Judo Championships. He is multiple-times Estonian champion. 2009–2017 he was a member of Estonian national judo team.

In 2015 he was named as Best Male Judoka of Estonia.
